= Davis–Weber Canal =

Coordinates: 41°09′33″N 112°00′31″W

The Davis–Weber Canal (also known as the Davis and Weber Counties Canal) is a canal in southern Weber and northern Davis counties in northern Utah, United States, that flows around the north and west sides of Hill Air Force Base (Hill AFB), supplying water from the Weber River to the area.

== Description ==
The canal transports water from the Weber River to users in parts of Weber and Davis counties for residential garden and lawn purposes, as well as agricultural. Water for canal is stored in both the East Canyon Reservoir and the Echo Reservoir. The canal is owned and operated by the Davis and Weber Counties Canal Company (DWCCC), a private nonprofit organization established in 1884 and headquartered in Sunset.

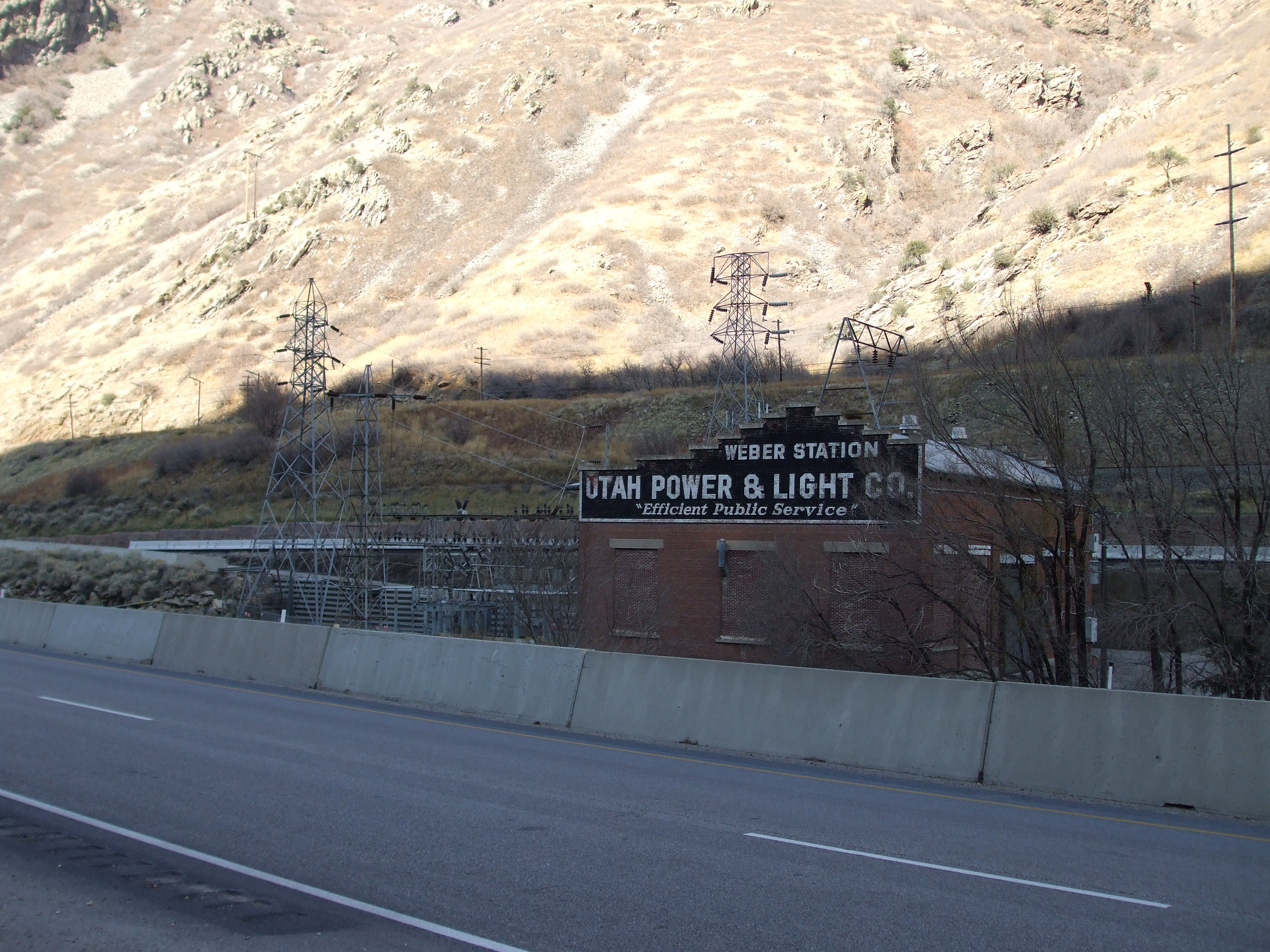
The lower part of the Devil's Gate-Weber Hydroelectric Power Plant, were the Davis–Weber Canal originates, November 2009

The canal begins on the south side of the Weber River at a diversion dam immediately below the lower part of the Devil's Gate-Weber Hydroelectric Power Plant in Weber Canyon (on the border of Weber and Davis counties). From its head, the open canal immediately flows west under the eastbound lanes of Interstate 84 before reaching its first enclosure. The enclosed canal then flows westerly down the south edge of the canyon, and just south Weber River (with Interstate 84 just north of the river). At the mouth of the Weber Canyon, the now open canal continues southwesterly (while the river and the highway continue west). After entering the city of South Weber, the canal passes under U.S. Route 89. From there it continues northwesterly along the southern edge of South Weber, at the base of the plateau upon which Hill AFB is located. (The Bambrough Canal also flows along this course, just north of the Davis–Weber Canal.) Between about 1650 East to about 600 East, the canal has been enclosed. On the western end of South Weber, the canal is once again enclosed, before passing under the south end of Utah State Route 168 (just north of the unused North Gate of Hill AFB).

As the canal crosses the Davis–Weber county line it also leaves South Weber to enter the city of Riverdale. The slope of the edge of the plateau is particularly steep as the still enclosed canal passes through Riverdale to the northernmost tip of Hill AFB, just east of Interstate 15 (I‑15). The canal then turns southerly to run between I‑15 on the west and Hill AFB on the east. Just after turning south, the canal leaves Riverdale and briefly passes through the eastern edge of the city of Roy. Upon crossing the Davis–Weber county line again, the canal leaves Roy and enters the city of Sunset, and the canal becomes open again.

Running south between I‑15 and Hill AFB, the canal continues through Sunset until about 1700 North. After crossing southwesterly under I‑15 and North Main Street (Utah State Route 126), the open canal continues south along the west side of North Main Street until about 1200 North. The canal then becomes enclosed again until after it crosses back under South Main Street at about 830 North. At 800 North, the canal leaves Sunset and enters the city of Clearfield. After passing under East 650 North (Utah State Route 103), the once again open canal turns southeasterly an begins passing through residential neighborhoods on the west side of I‑15. Between East 650 North and East 300 North, the northern section of the Clearfield Canal Trail runs along the western bank of the canal. South of East 300 North, canal becomes enclosed again as it continues on its southeasterly course. At about 340 South, canal returns to the west side of I‑15 and, not longer enclosed, passes east under the freeway.

On the east side of I‑15, the canal is immediately joined by the southern section of the Clearfield Canal Trail (which been running southeast along the east edge the freeway from East 200 South). Continuing on, the still open canal runs southeasterly between I‑15 on the southwest (with the Clearfield Canal Trail in between) and South 1000 East on the northeast. At about 615 South, the canal and trail abruptly and briefly tune east before the canal passes under East 1000 South. The still open canal continues east-southeasterly until it reaches East 700 South (Utah State Route 193/Bernard Fisher Highway); the trail runs along the west edge of South 1000 East for this short section. The canal is enclosed again to pass directly south under the highway and remains enclosed for another brief stretch. South of East 700 South, the enclosed canal resumes its east-southeast course through residential neighborhoods, with the Clearfield Canal Trail on its southeastern bank. Just before crossing under South 1500 East, the canal opens once again, but continues its east-southeasterly course until it reaches University Park Boulevard/North 1200 West. The southern section of the Clearfield Canal Trail ends at that street as the canal leaves Clearfield and enters the city of Layton.

After entering Layton, the still open canal continues its east-southeasterly course through residential neighborhoods, but becomes enclosed once again, just before crossing under North 1000 East. Remaining enclosed on its east-southeasterly course, the canal passes under North 800 West and North 650 East. At about 550 East, the canal turns slightly to a more easterly course before passing under North Hill Field Road (Utah State Route 232). Resuming a more east-southeasterly course, the still enclosed canal passes by the southern edge of Northridge High School before crossing under North 50 West, Antelope Drive, and North Fort Lane. After North Fort Lane, the canal turns slightly north before heading southeast to the Church Street Reservoir. Surplus from that reservoir flows in an unlined ditch under Church Street and North Fairfield Road before emptying into Kays Creek (which flows southwesterly to the Farmington Bay of the Great Salt Lake.

== History ==
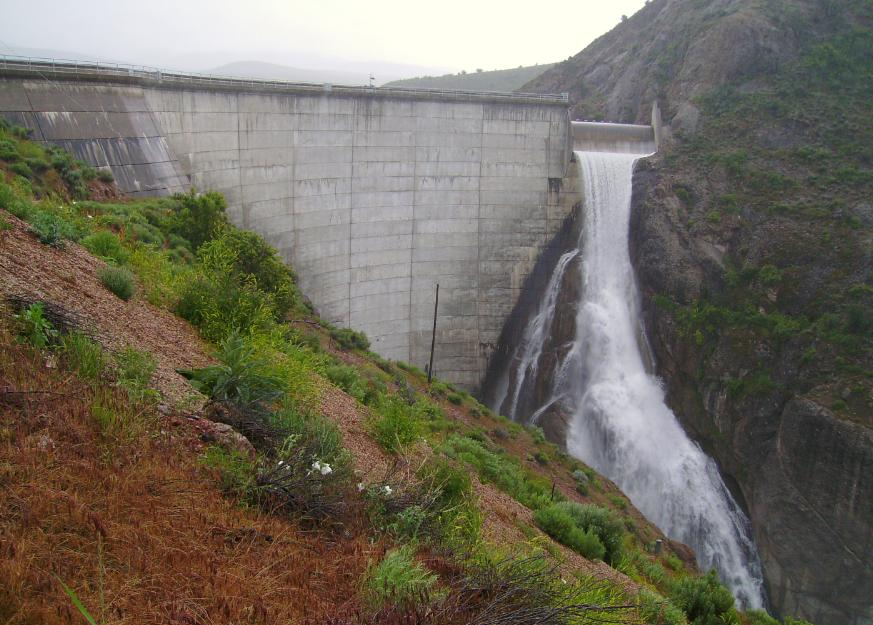
East Canyon Dam, June 2009

The original canal was built by the DWCCC in the mid 1880s to provide water for agricultural needs and eventually extended 23 miles (37 km) south to reach Fruit Heights. To ensure the Weber River could sustain adequate water flow for the canal, an earthen dam was built by the DWCCC on the East Canyon Creek (a tributary of the Weber River) in East Canyon. By the early 1910s the original earthen canal was reconstructed and lined with concrete. Although improvements continued on the dam, having been enlarged twice since it was originally constructed, the original dam in East Canyon was replaced in the mid-1910s with a new concrete dam, also built by the DWCCC. However, the second dam was replaced by a third dam, built below the second, in the mid-1960s. Although the third dam was built by the United States Bureau of Reclamation, it is still operated by the DWCCC, with financial support from the Weber Basin Water Conservancy District. Over the years much of agricultural land in the service area has transitioned to residential subdivisions. As a result, beginning in the 1980s, the canal began supplying secondary water (untreated, [non-potable] water used only for residential lawn and gardening) in its service area. As of 2004, the secondary water was supplied by the canal in parts of Layton and Kaysville, as well as for the cities of Clinton and West Point.
