= Utah State Route 126 (disambiguation) =

State Route 126

Location
- Country: United States
- State: Utah

Highway system
- Utah State Highway System; Interstate; US; State; Minor; Scenic
| ← SR-125 | → SR-127 |

Utah State Route 126 may refer to one of the following state highways in Utah, United States:

- Utah State Route 126 (1931-1933), a former state highway in Millard County connecting Oak City with Lynndyl
- Utah State Route 126 (1933-1969), a former state highway in Beaver County connecting Greenville with SR-21 (north of Greenville)
- Utah State Route 126 (May–August 1977), a temporary renumbering of Utah State Route 82 in Box Elder County connecting Tremonton with SR-13 (east of Garland)
- Utah State Route 126, the current state highway in Davis, Weber, and Box Elder counties connecting Layton with South Willard

== See also ==
- List of state highways in Utah
- List of highways numbered 126
