= Utah State Route 98 (1969–2000) =

Former state highway in Utah, United States

State Route 98
- West 5500 South

Route information
- Maintained by UDOT
- Length: 3.0 mi (4.8 km)
- Existed: 1969–2000

Major junctions
- West end: SR-37 in Hooper
- East end: SR-108 in Roy

Location
- Country: United States
- State: Utah

Highway system
- Utah State Highway System; Interstate; US; State; Minor; Scenic
← SR-97	→ SR-99

Utah State Route 98 (SR-98) was a state highway in Weber County, Utah, United States. The designation was applied to an approximately 3-mile (4.8 km) street that runs east–west and connects SR-37 in Hooper with SR-108 in Roy.

== Route description ==
The route began at the intersection of West 5500 South and South 5900 West (SR-37) in Hooper. (Hooper Elementary School is located on the northeast corner of this intersection.) From the western terminus the route ran east as West 5500 South. After crossing South 5500 West and South 5100 West, with several side streets along the way, it reached South 4300 West. That cross street is the also the border between Hooper and Roy. After entering Roy, it continued east along West 5500 South, with several more side streets, until it reached its eastern terminus at West 3500 South (SR-108).

== History ==
The original SR-98 was created in 1935 and was located in Iron County, in the southern part of the state. It began on SR-56 at Beryl Junction, a point (and community) between Modena and Newcastle. From its southern terminus it ran north for about 12.75 miles (20.52 km) to its northern terminus in Beryl. While this road is still in use (now named the Beryl Highway) it was removed from the state highway system in 1969. However, the SR-98 designation was immediately reassigned.

When the newer SR-98 was created in 1969, the nearby SR-97 had been modified such that it ran east along West 5600 South from South 3500 West (SR-108) to the North Gate (also known as Roy Gate) of Hill Air Force Base, crossing South 1900 West (SR-126) and having an interchange with I-15 just before reaching the base. (SR-97 currently follows this same routing.) This meant that the western terminus of SR-98 was just one block north of the western terminus of SR-97, both along SR-108. This disjointed east-west flow of traffic continued for three decades. By 2000 a construction project was completed that included moving eastern end of SR-98 south such that it connected directly with the eastern terminus of SR-97 (at South 5600 West). Accordingly, the entire (newer) SR-98 (except for the approximate pre-construction 1,650 feet [500 m] that ran west from SR-108) was incorporated into SR-97 by the State Highway Commission and the SR-98 designation was dropped. Notwithstanding the Commission's action in 2000, it took the Utah State Legislature another five years to incorporate this change into state law.

== Major intersections ==
The entire route is in Weber County.

Location	mi	km	Destinations	Notes
Hooper	0.0	0.0	SR-37 (South 5900 West)	Western terminus
Roy	3.0	4.8	SR-108 (South 3500 West)	Eastern terminus
1.000 mi = 1.609 km; 1.000 km = 0.621 mi

== See also ==
- List of state highways in Utah
- State highways deleted by the Utah State Legislature in 1969
