= Utah State Route 104 =

State highway in Utah, United States

State Route 104

Route information
- Maintained by UDOT
- Length: 3.088 mi (4.970 km)
- Existed: 1935–present

Major junctions
- West end: SR-126 in Ogden
- I-15 in Ogden
- East end: SR-204 in Ogden

Location
- Country: United States
- State: Utah

Highway system
- Utah State Highway System; Interstate; US; State; Minor; Scenic
← SR-103	→ SR-105

State Route 104 (SR-104) is a state highway in the U.S. state of Utah that sits completely within Ogden in Weber County. The eastern end of this route is a one-way pair of 20th Street and 21st Street that connects I-15 and SR-126 to downtown Ogden, a distance of about 2.5 miles (4.0 km).

== Route description ==
From the western terminus at SR-126 (1900 West) in Ogden, the route is named 21st Street, a standard two-way, east–west minor arterial, with an interchange with I-15 near the west end. This section of the route is about 2 miles (3.2 km) long. About half a mile west of the eastern terminus at SR-204 (Wall Ave), as it starts to pass over railroad tracks, the route splits into a one-way pair, with the eastbound lanes continuing as 21st street, and the westbound lanes located one block to the north as 20th Street.

== History ==
The route was established in 1935. Prior to 1969, the western terminus was the same, but the road followed a slightly more southern alignment along Wilson Lane and about 1.5 miles (2.4 km) to the east, the route turned southeast (now Exchange Road) and ended at 24th Street (then SR-37, now SR-53) just west of its viaduct.

In 1965, in order to relieve congestion on the inadequate 24th Street viaduct, the State Road Commission approved funds for the construction of 20th Street between SR-104 west of the railroads (Wilson Lane) and Wall Avenue for the 1968 fiscal year urban program. This new roadway was designated SR-205 and was about 1.2 miles (1.9 km) long. That route was deleted in 1969 and transferred to SR-104.

== Major intersections ==
The entire route is in Ogden, Weber County.

mi	km	Destinations	Notes
0.000	0.000	SR-126 (1900 West)	Western terminus
0.586– 0.817	0.943– 1.315	I-15 – Salt Lake City, Brigham City	
2.492– 2.493	4.010– 4.012	SR-204 (Wall Ave)	Eastern terminus (road turns back to the west, parallel and one block north of eastbound segment - see one-way pair)
1.000 mi = 1.609 km; 1.000 km = 0.621 mi
