= Utah State Route 38 (disambiguation) =

State Route 38

Location
- Country: United States
- State: Utah

Highway system
- Utah State Highway System; Interstate; US; State; Minor; Scenic
← SR-37	→ SR-39

Utah State Route 38 may refer to:

- Utah State Route 38, a state highway in eastern Box Elder County, Utah, United States that runs north from Brigham City to Collinston (northeast of Tremonton)
- Utah State Route 38 (1968-1975), a former state highway in east-central Iron County, Utah, United States that ran from I-15 in Summit northeast to SR-143 in Parowan (along the former routing of US-91)
- Utah State Route 38 (1927-1966), a former state highway in southwestern Weber County, Utah, United States that ran west from Ogden and then south to SR-1 (also known as US-91)

== See also ==
- List of state highways in Utah
- List of highways numbered 38
