= Utah State Route 110 =

State highway in Utah, United States

State Route 110
- 4500 West

Route information
- Maintained by UDOT
- Length: 3.495 mi (5.625 km)
- Existed: 1969–present

Major junctions
- South end: SR-127 in Syracuse
- SR-107 in West Point
- North end: SR-37 in West Point

Location
- Country: United States
- State: Utah

Highway system
- Utah State Highway System; Interstate; US; State; Minor; Scenic
← SR-109	→ SR-111

State Route 110 (SR-110) is a state highway in the U.S. state of Utah, connecting SR-127 in Syracuse with SR-37 in West Point. The highway is routed entirely on 4500 West.

== Route description ==
SR-110 follows 4500 West in the Weber Valley, near the east shore of the Great Salt Lake and west of the Hooper Canal. The relatively flat route, at about 4,230 feet (1,290 m) above sea level, travels north from SR-127 to SR-37 through the Ogden suburbs of Syracuse and West Point.

== History ==
State Route 195 was created in 1935, running west and north from what was then the end of SR-108 in Syracuse through West Point to the then-end of SR-37 in Hooper. An extension of SR-37 cut back the north end of SR-195 to a point west of Clinton in 1945, and in 1947 the latter route was removed from the state highway system. The portion of SR-195 heading west from SR-108 was restored in 1965 as part of SR-127, and in 1969 a new SR-110 brought the remainder of old SR-195 back onto the system.

== Major intersections ==
The entire route is in Davis County.

Location	mi	km	Destinations	Notes
Syracuse	0.000	0.000	SR-127 (1700 South)	
West Point	1.991	3.204	SR-107 (300 North)	
West Point	3.495	5.625	SR-37 (1800 North)	
1.000 mi = 1.609 km; 1.000 km = 0.621 mi
