= Utah State Route 103 =

State highway in Clearfield, Utah, United States

State Route 103
- 650 North
- SR-103 highlighted in red

Route information
- Maintained by UDOT
- Length: 0.225 mi (362 m)
- Existed: April 19, 1965–present

Major junctions
- West end: SR-126 in Clearfield
- East end: I-15 in Clearfield

Location
- Country: United States
- State: Utah

Highway system
- Utah State Highway System; Interstate; US; State; Minor; Scenic
← SR-102	→ SR-104

State Route 103 (SR-103) is a 0.225-mile-long (362 m) urban minor arterial state highway in the U.S. state of Utah. It branches off from SR-126 (Main Street) in downtown Clearfield and extends east to Interstate 15 (I-15), with the roadway continuing to the Falcon Hill National Aerospace Research Park, just outside Hill Air Force Base. The entire route is located in Davis County and was formed in 1965 coinciding with the construction of I-15.

The western terminus, in a stretch of fourteen years from its inception, has gone from SR-1 in 1965, to SR-106 in 1967, to SR-84 in 1969, and SR-126 in 1979. In 1979, the moniker of the roadway for SR-103 was changed from 600 North to 650 North. SR-103 is one of four Utah state highways that connect to Hill Air Force Base, the others being SR-97, SR-168, and SR-232. Only SR-168 has a lower average daily traffic count, with roughly 1,000 vehicles-per-day traveling along the highway compared to SR-103's approximately 16,000 vehicles-per-day. The highway has been largely unchanged since its formation, except for the addition of traffic lights at the on and off ramps for I-15, and a slight truncation of the east end from the air force base gate to I-15.

== Route description ==
State Route 103 (SR-103) begins at an intersection with SR-126, locally known as Main Street in Clearfield. At this intersection, 650 North, which continues the right-of-way, lengthens from a two lane local street into a four lane arterial boulevard at SR-126. SR-103 begins its progression eastward, passing between two commercial complexes. After a crossing of the Davis-Weber Canal, the sidewalk on the southern side of the roadway turns to the south to follow the canal forming the Clearfield Canal Trail. SR-103 highway turns to the northeast, intersecting with the southbound on-ramp and off-ramp to Interstate 15 (I-15). After this intersection, SR-103 expands to five lanes, and crosses under the southbound and northbound lanes of I-15. After the overpasses, SR-103 intersects with the northbound on-ramp and off-ramp from I-15. At this point, the SR-103 designation ends. However, the 650 North roadway progresses straight for about 300 ft (91 m), passing a gated fence on the north side of the highway leading to a rail stub, and the dead-end of Aspen Avenue, before reaching the entrance to the Falcon Hill National Aerospace Research Park, just outside Hill Air Force Base. From there, the right-of-way continues on the arterial in the base itself.

SR-103 serves the function of connecting the town of Clearfield and residents along I-15 to Hill Air Force Base. The base, as of 2012, was the sixth largest employer in the state of Utah and is the third largest employer which is neither the state government nor a state-funded higher education institution. SR-103 is one of four Utah state highways that connect to Hill Air Force Base, the others being SR-97, SR-168 and SR-232, Only SR-168 has a lower average daily traffic count, with roughly 1,000 vehicles-per-day traveling along the highway compared to SR-103's approximately 16,000 vehicles-per-day. This is a decline from previous years (in 2007 the average on SR-103 was 22,525; in 2006, the average was 22,215; in 2005, 21,275). Four percent of this traffic was composed of trucks. The measurement point for the traffic counts is at the eastern terminus of SR-103, the entrance to the Falcon Hill National Aerospace Research Park. The highway is codified as Utah Code §72-4-116, and is designated as a minor arterial, which the Federal Highway Administration defines as linking major arterials at a lower volume than a primary arterial.

== History ==
SR-103 was originally on a road from West Ogden north to the junction with US 89 (then cosigned with US-91 and SR-1) at North Ogden Hot Springs. In 1935 the state of Utah and the Utah Department of Transportation (UDOT) decommissioned this alignment of SR-103. The SR-103 designation was rewritten in the Utah Code as a highway following Harrison Street in the city of Ogden. Between 1964 and 1965, the state of Utah and the Utah Department of Transportation (UDOT) decommissioned the alignment of SR-103 on Harrison Street, renumbering the portion of Harrison Street as SR-203. The SR-103 designation was soon rewritten in the Utah Code as an access road to Hill Air Force Base on April 19, 1965.

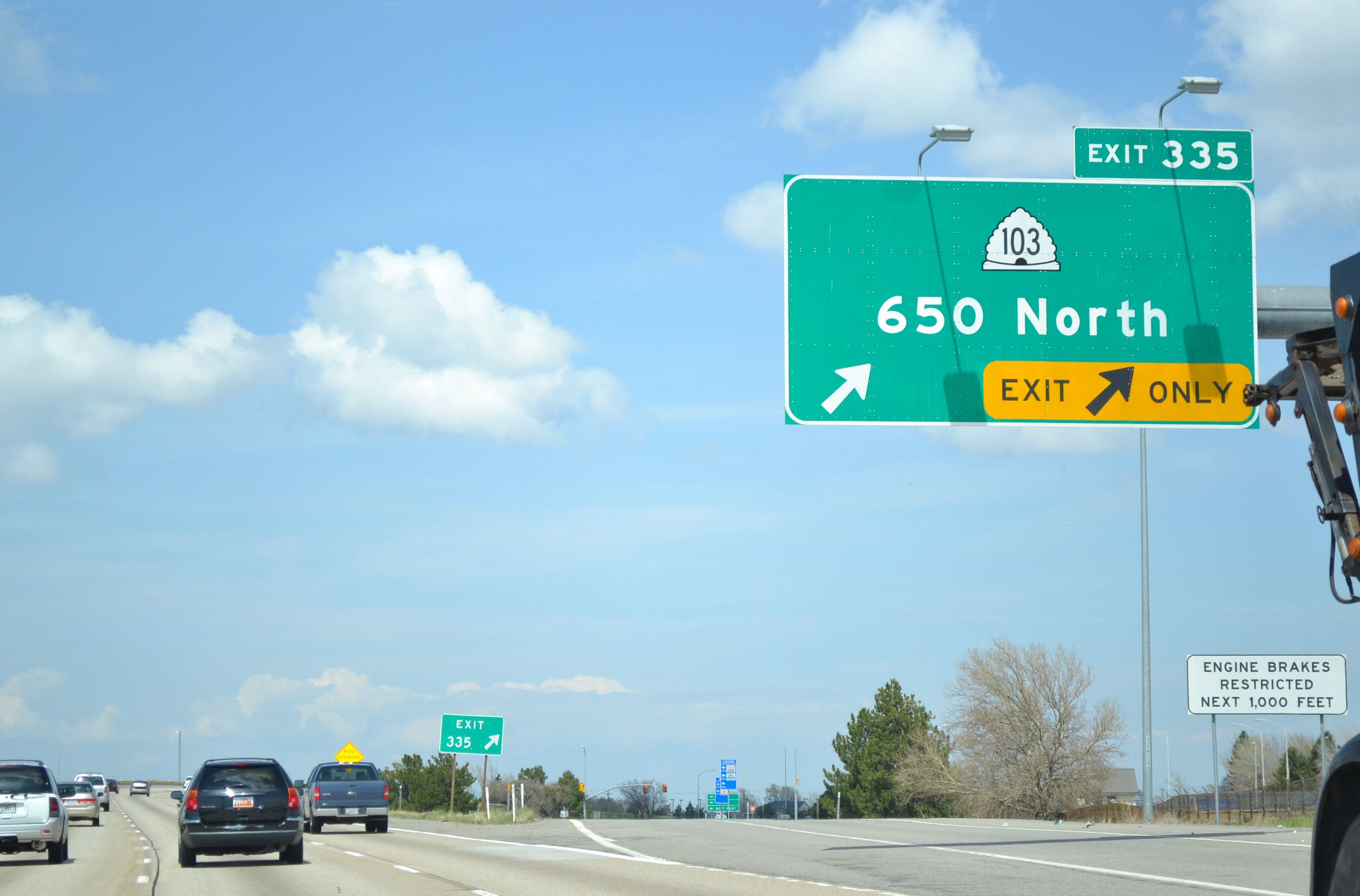
The SR-103 exit from northbound I-15

The new alignment, which the state felt was a major connector to a federal military institution, Hill Air Force Base, from U.S. Route 91 (US-91) and I-15 was chosen as a state highway US-91, before the formation of I-15, was the major thoroughfare through Utah, connecting it to California and Montana. SR-103 was then designated onto its alignment, adding 0.225-mile (362 m) to the Utah state route system. Prior to designation, the alignment of 600 North went from U.S. Route 91 and uninterrupted until the Hill Air Force Base. In 1964, a year prior to designation, a 27-foot-long (8.2 m) concrete culvert bridge was constructed over the Davis Weber Canal. The two bridges for I-15's southbound and northbound roadways were built in 1966 and are two 159-foot-long (48.5 m) concrete continuous tee beam overpasses.

The route has been mostly unchanged since its formation, except for the moniker of the highway and the western terminus, of which SR-103 progresses. The western terminus, in a stretch of fourteen years from its inception, went from SR-1 in 1965, to SR-106 in 1967 to SR-84 in 1969 and SR-126 in 1979. In 1979, the moniker of the roadway for SR-103 was changed from 600 North to 650 North. In 1998, the legal definition of SR-103 was changed in the state codes.

The alignment of SR-103, outside of the roadway renumbering, has received some technical changes as well. In November 1992, UDOT confirmed that the interchange of I-15 and SR-103 (exit 335) was to be given traffic lights to help monitor traffic. The mayor at the time, Neldon Hamblin, approved of the project, and put the project up for bids for construction. The interchange was holding up motorists needing to turn left up to 20 minutes.

The most recent change to SR-103 came in March 2019, when the Utah State Legislature approved a slight truncation of the east end of the route. The segment of 650 North between I-15 and the base gate was removed from the legal definition of SR-103 at that time, bringing the eastern terminus back to the I-15 interchange.

== Major intersections ==
The entire route is in Clearfield, Davis County.

mi	km	Destinations	Notes
0.000	0.000	SR-126 (Main Street)	Western terminus, roadway continues west as 650 North
0.080– 0.225	0.129– 0.362	I-15 – Salt Lake City, Ogden	Eastern terminus; I-15 exit 335; diamond interchange
1.000 mi = 1.609 km; 1.000 km = 0.621 mi

== See also ==
- List of Utah State Routes shorter than one mile
