= List of state highways in Utah =

- Standard state highway markers in Utah

Highway names
- Interstates: Interstate nn (I-nn)
- US Highways: US Highway nn (US-nn)
- State: State Route nn (SR-nn)

System links
- Utah State Highway System; Interstate; US; State; Minor; Scenic

The U.S. state of Utah, the Utah Department of Transportation (UDOT) operates a system of state routes that serve all portions of the state. In official documents the state of Utah uses the term "state routes" for numbered, state maintained highways, since the legal definition of a "highway" includes any public road. UDOT signs state routes with a beehive symbol after the state's nickname of the beehive state. There are 3,658.04 miles (5,887.04 km) (Note: This was calculated from adding all of the mileages listed in the "Length" section of the List of current routes.) of state routes in Utah.

The numbers and routes of all Utah highways are assigned by the state legislature, currently documented in Utah Code Title 72, Chapter 4. The code also defines the Utah maintained portions of Interstate and U.S. Highways. With the exception of state route numbers assigned to match U.S. Highways and Interstate Highways, Utah state route numbers are not designated per any consistent pattern, though there are a few regional clusters of sequentially numbered highways.

There have been multiple changes to the numbering of state routes. Since 1969, the block of numbers between 281 and 320 is reserved for routes serving state institutions and state parks. With a few exceptions, these routes do not have their numbers publicly posted. Since 1977, the legislative designations do not have any concurrencies. For the situations where two numbered roads share the same physical roadbed, one of the designations will have a discontinuity in the legislative designation. For example, Interstate 84 is defined as a highway with two separate segments in Utah code, the part where I-84 is signed concurrent with Interstate 15 is only legally designated I-15.

Two Utah state Routes are special cases. State Route 900 and 901 are actually federal and county-maintained dirt roads that were assigned state numbers as to give the state power to block the transportation of nuclear waste to a proposed dump on Goshute tribal lands.

The longest contiguous highway signed as a Utah State Route is State Route 24 at 160.243 miles (257.886 km), but State Route 30 is longer at 223 miles (359 km) when unsigned concurrencies are included. The longest highway of any type in Utah is U.S. Route 89 at 502.577 miles (808.819 km). The shortest state route is State Route 231, a 0.085 miles (0.137 km) connector route in Fairview, though this route is unsigned. The shortest signed route is State Route 103 at 0.225 miles (0.362 km) long, connecting Hill Air Force Base to I-15 and SR-126.

== List ==
Number	South or west terminus	North or east terminus	Length (mi)	Length (km)	Formed	Deleted	Notes
SR-1	Arizona state line near St. George	Idaho state line near Malad, Idaho	400.592	644.690	1962	1977	Legislative designation for I-15
SR-1	Arizona state line near Littlefield, Arizona	Idaho state line near Franklin, Idaho			1920s	1962	Legislative designation for US-91
SR-2	Nevada state line in Wendover	Wyoming state line near Evanston, Wyoming	196.680	316.526	1962	1977	Legislative designation for I-80
SR-2	SR-1 (US-91)	Garden City			1920s	1962	Legislative designation for US-89 through Logan Canyon
SR-3	Idaho state line near Snowville	I-80 in Echo	119.773	192.756	1962	1977	Legislative designation for I-84
SR-3	Idaho state line near Montpelier, Idaho	Wyoming state line near Evanston, Wyoming			1920s	1962	Now SR-16 and a portion of US-89
SR-4	I-15 near Cove Fort	Colorado State line near Fruita, Colorado	231.673	372.842	1962	1977	Legislative designation for I-70
SR-4	Nevada state line in Wendover	Wyoming state line near Evanston, Wyoming			1920s	1962	Legislative designation for modern I-80, then US-40, US-530 and US-30S
SR-5	I-80 in Salt Lake City	I-15 in North Salt Lake	28.928	46.555	1962	1977	Legislative designation for I-215
SR-5	US-91 in Ogden	US-530 near Echo	38.73	62.330	1920s	1962	Legislative designation for portion of modern I-84, then a portion of US-30S
SR-6	US-40 near Park City	Colorado state line near Dinosaur, Colorado			1920s	1977	Legislative designation for US-40 in eastern Utah
SR-7	I-15 in St. George	Sand Hollow Road near Hurricane	18.299	29.449	2009	current	Southern Parkway
SR-7	US-89 in Provo	US-40 in Heber City			1920s	1977	Legislative designation for US-189
SR-8	Dixie Downs Road/Dixie Drive in St. George	SR-18 (Bluff Street) in St. George	1.303	2.097	1991	current	Sunset Boulevard
SR-8	I-15 in Lehi	US-6 in Moark Junction			1920s	1977	Legislative designation for US-89 from north of Lehi to Moark Junction. Prior to 1962 was also the legislative designation for US-6 from Moark Junction to the Colorado state line.
SR-9	I-15 at Harrisburg Junction (near La Verkin)	US-89 (State Street) at Mount Carmel Junction	57.075	91.853	1977	current	
SR-9	US-50 at Crescent Junction	Colorado state line near Dove Creek, Colorado			1920s	1977	Modern U.S. Route 191 and U.S. Route 491
SR-10	I-70/US-50/SR-72 (Exit 91) east of Fremont Junction	SR-55 (100 North) in Price	68.816	110.749	1920s	current	
SR-11	U.S. Route 89A at the Arizona state line near Fredonia, Arizona	US-89 in Kanab	2.945	4.740	1920s	2008	Now US-89A, prior to 1977 SR-11 extended north of Kanab towards Nephi
SR-12	US-89 at Bryce Canyon Junction south east of Panguitch	SR-24 east of Torrey	122.863	197.729	1920s	current	
SR-13	US-89/US-91 (1100 South) in Brigham City	I-15 (Exit 392) northwest of Plymouth	33.135	53.326	1977	current	Old routing of US-191
SR-13	U.S. Route 91 in Logan	Bear Lake			1962	1977	Legislative designation for US-89 through Logan Canyon
SR-13	U.S. Route 91 at Cove Fort	US-89 near Joseph			1920s	1962	Now part of I-70
SR-14	SR-130 (Main Street) in Cedar City	US-89 at Long Valley Junction east of Duck Creek Village	40.995	65.975	1920s	current	
SR-15	I-15 at Harrisburg Junction (near La Verkin)	US-89 at Mount Carmel Junction	57.075	91.853	1920s	1977	Renumbered SR-9
SR-16	Wyoming Highway 89 at the Wyoming state line near Evanston, Wyoming	SR-30 at Sage Creek Junction (Bear Lake)	29.359	47.249	1962	current	
SR-16	SR-18 in Enterprise	SR-56 in Newcastle			1935	1955	
SR-16	La Verkin	Arizona state line near Short Creek, Arizona			1920s	1935	Modern SR-59
SR-17	SR-9 in La Verkin	I-15 at Anderson Junction	6.060	9.753	1927	current	
SR-17	Brigham City	Idaho state line near Portage			1920s	1927	part of modern SR-13
SR-18	I-15 in St. George	SR-56 at Beryl Junction	51.005	82.085	1930s	current	
SR-19	I-70/US-6/US-50/US-191 west of Green River	I-70/US-6/US-50/US-191 near Elgin (Green River)	4.552	7.326	1969	current	Old routing of US-6/US-50
SR-19	Cedar City	Lund			1930s	1969	No longer part of the state highway network
SR-20	I-15 north of Paragonah	US-89 at Orton (Bear Valley Junction)	20.492	32.979	1930s	current	
SR-21	Nevada State Route 487 at the Nevada state line near Baker, Nevada	SR-160 in Beaver	107.575	173.125	1930s	current	
SR-22	Antimony	SR-62	6.852	11.027	1930s	current	
SR-23	US-89/US-91 south of Wellsville	County Road D1 at the Idaho state line near Weston, Idaho	29.890	48.103	1953	current	
SR-23	Widtsoe	Escalante			1930s	1947	Now part of SR-12
SR-24	US-50 near Salina	I-70/US-50 west of Green River	160.294	257.968	1930s	current	
SR-24A	US-89 southwest of Sigurd	SR-24 in Sigurd			1950s	1960s	
SR-25	SR-24 at Fish Lake Junction	Bowery Haven Resort (Fish Lake)	9.995	16.085	1930s	current	
SR-26	SR-126 in Roy	US-89 in Ogden	3.724	5.993	1977	current	
SR-26	US-50 in Delta	US-89 in Salina			1930s	1977	Now part of US-50
SR-26A	US-91 south of Santaquin	US-6/US-50 in Santaquin			1950s	1960s	
SR-27	Nevada state line near Baker, Nevada	US-91 near Santaquin			1930s	1977	Legislative designation for US-6 in western Utah. Between 1962-1977 included other portions of US-6 corridor.
SR-28	US-89 in Gunnison	I-15 north of Nephi	43.612	70.187	1930s	current	Between 1962-1977 extended south of Gunnison to Salina, as a legislative designation for a portion of US-89.
SR-29	Joes Valley Reservoir	SR-10 north of Castle Dale	21.732	34.974	1930s	current	
SR-30	Nevada State Route 233 at the Nevada state line near Montello, Nevada	Wyoming Highway 89 at the Wyoming state line near Kemmerer, Wyoming	135.620	218.259 (Note: This route is broken into several pieces, and the length does not reflect the concurrencies or connections that would be required to make the route continuous.)	1966	current	
SR-30	Fountain Green	Spring City			1935	1966	
SR-31	US-89 in Fairview	SR-10 in Huntington	47.746	76.840	1930s	current	
SR-32	US-40 north of Heber City	I-80 northeast of Wanship	29.053	46.756	1989	current	Old routing of US-189
SR-32	Pigeon Hollow Junction	Thistle			1930s	1977	Legislative designation for a portion of US-89
SR-33	US-6 near Helper	US-40 in Duchesne			1930s	1981	now part of US-191
SR-34	SR-18 in St. George	Towards Washington	2.150	3.460	1964	current	
SR-34	US-40 near Heber City	US-530 in Wanship			1930s	1953	Now SR-248
SR-35	SR-32 at Francis	SR-87 north of Duchesne	62.012	99.799	1930s	current	Originally extended north of Francis along what is now SR-32
SR-36	US-6 west of Eureka	I-80 north of Tooele	66.406	106.870	1930s	current	
SR-37	SR-126 in Sunset	SR-108 near Roy	12.351	19.877	1930s	current	
SR-38	SR-13 in Brigham City	SR-30 in Collinston	18.952	30.500	1993	current	
SR-38	I-15 near Parowan	I-15 near Parowan			1968	1975	Formerly part of US-91.
SR-38	Roy	Hooper Junction			1930s	1966	Now part of SR-37
SR-39	SR-134 west of Ogden	SR-16 in Woodruff	67.744	109.023	1930s	current	
SR-40					1930s	1977	Now part of SR-134
SR-41	I-15/SR-28 in Nephi	I-15 in Nephi			1968	2006	Formerly part of US-91, now part of SR-28
SR-41					1930s	1962	Now part of SR-13
SR-42	Idaho state line near Malta, Idaho	SR-30 at Curlew Junction (near Promontory)	7.390	11.893	1930s	current	Formerly part of US-30S
SR-43	Wyoming Highway 414 at the Wyoming state line near Mountain View, Wyoming	Wyoming Highway 530 at the Wyoming state line near Green River, Wyoming	10.557	16.990	1930s	current	
SR-44	US-191 at Greendale Junction (Flaming Gorge)	SR-43 in Manila	27.995	45.054	1930s	current	
SR-45	South of Bonanza	US-40 near Naples	40.028	64.419	1943	current	
SR-46	US-191 at La Sal Junction	Colorado State Highway 90 at the Colorado state line near Naturita, Colorado	21.595	34.754	1930s	current	
SR-47	Arizona state line in Monument Valley	Monticello			1930s	1977	Now US-163 and part of US-191
SR-48	SR-154 in West Jordan	US-89 in Midvale	4.562	7.342	1930s	current	
SR-49	US-91 at Farmington	I-84 near Ogden			1927	1977	Legislative designation for portion of US-89
SR-49A	US-89 at Uintah Junction	US-30S at Weber Canyon			1953	1966	
SR-50	SR-126 in Roy	US-89 in Ogden			1969	1977	Formerly part of US-91, now SR-26
SR-50	Wattis	SR-122 near Hiawatha			1935	1969	No longer part of the state highway network
SR-51	SR-147 in Spanish Fork	US-89 in Springville	3.339	5.374	1992	current	Formerly part of US-91
SR-51	SR-30 at Sage Creek Junction	Wyoming state line near Randolph			1930s	1977	Now part of SR-30
SR-52	SR-114 in Orem	US-189 in Orem	4.122	6.634	1930s	current	Also known as 800 North
SR-53	I-15/I-84 in Ogden	US-89 in Ogden	1.949	3.137	1969	current	
SR-53	US-6 near Wellington	US-40 in Nine Mile Canyon			1930s	1969	No longer part of the state highway network
SR-54	Mona	I-15 east of Mona	1.344	2.163	1971	current	
SR-54	SR-12 at Tropic Junction	SR-24 near Teasdale			1930s	1969	
SR-55	US-6/US-191 west of Price	US-6/US-191 southeast of Price	2.942	4.735	1975	current	Old routing of US-6
SR-55					1930s	1969	
SR-56	Nevada State Route 319 at the Nevada state line near Caliente, Nevada	SR-130 in Cedar City	61.502	98.978	1930s	current	
SR-57	SR-10 south of Orangeville	Wilberg Mine northwest of Orangeville	10.691	17.205	1930s	current	
SR-58	I-80 Bus. at Nevada state line in West Wendover, Nevada	I-80 (Exit 2) in Wendover	1.363	2.194	1969	current	Formerly part of US-40
SR-58	Kanarraville	Kanarraville			1965	1969	Formerly part of US-91
SR-58	SR-36	Clover			1945	1953	
SR-59	Arizona State Route 389 in Colorado City, Arizona	SR-9 in Hurricane	22.206	35.737	1930s	current	
SR-60	SR-26 in Riverdale	US-89 in South Weber	7.496	12.064	1930s	current	Formerly part of US-30S
SR-61	SR-23 in Cornish	US-91 at Webster Junction (near Cove)	7.287	11.727	1930s	current	
SR-62	US-89 south of Junction	SR-24 at Plateau Junction near Koosharem	42.833	68.933	1930s	current	
SR-63	Bryce Canyon National Park	SR-12 near Tropic Junction	2.630	4.233	1975	current	
SR-63					1930s	1971	
SR-63A					1953	1969	
SR-64	I-15 south of Holden	US-50 in Holden	2.015	3.243	1975	current	Formerly part of US-91
SR-64	Arizona state line near St. George	US-91 in St. George			1930s	1969	No longer part of state highway network
SR-65	I-80 (Exit 134) near Mountain Dell Reservoir	I-84 (Exit 115) in Henefer	28.315	45.569	1930s	current	
SR-66	SR-65 (East Canyon Road) northwest of East Canyon Reservoir	I-84 (Exit 103) in Morgan	14.346	23.088	1930s	current	
SR-67	I-215 near North Salt Lake	I-15/US-89 in Farmington	11.500	18.507	2008	current	Also signed as Legacy Parkway
SR-67	US-6 at Tintic Junction	SR-36 near Tintic Junction			1975	1991	Connector between SR-36 and US-6, now part of SR-36
SR-67	Dixie Junior College	Dixie Junior College			1962	1969	Legislative designation for state maintained roads at Dixie Junior College, Now SR-281
SR-67					1930s	1962	Legislative designation for portion of modern I-80 from SR 201 to I-15
SR-68	US-6 at Elberta	US-89 in Woods Cross	70.623	113.657	1930s	current	Also known as Redwood Road
SR-69	US-89 in Brigham City	Collinston			1930s	1993	Renumbered to SR-38 because of the sexual connotation of the number
SR-70	Nevada State Route 30 at the Nevada state line near Montello, Nevada	US-30S near Snowville			1930s	1977	Now part of SR-30
SR-71	SR-154 in Riverton	SR-186 in Salt Lake City	22.465	36.154	1930s	current	
SR-72	SR-24 in Loa	I-70/US-50/SR-10 near Fremont Junction	35.393	56.960	1930s	current	
SR-73	SR-36 northeast of St. John Station (near Stockton & Rush Valley)	US-89 (State Street) in Lehi	36.147	58.173	1930s	current	
SR-74	US-89 (East Main Street) in American Fork	Immediately southwest of Canyon Crest Road in Alpine	5.058	8.140	1930s	current	
SR-75	I-15 in Springville	US-89 Springville	2.023	3.256	1962	current	
SR-75	US-91 in Salem	US-91 in Salem			1930s	1953	
SR-76	I-70 (Exit 86) west of Fremont Junction	SR-72 at Fremont Junction	2.431	3.912	1977	current	Formerly part of SR-10
SR-76	Paragonah	Parowan			1968	1969	Formerly part of US-91, now part of SR-271
SR-76	US-91 in Cove Fort	Sulphurdale			1941	1963	
SR-77	SR-147 north of Benjamin	US-89 in Springville	9.069	14.595	1962	current	
SR-77	US-91 in Provo	US-91 in Springville			1930s	1953	
SR-78	I-15 near Mills Junction (Juab County)	SR-28 in Levan	9.418	15.157	1977	current	
SR-78	Orem	Orem			1930s	1969	800 South in Orem
SR-79	SR-108 in West Haven	SR-203 in Ogden	5.705	9.181 (Note: This route includes a one-way pair, and the length given includes mileage on both streets.)	1957	current	
SR-79	US-91 in Springville	Hobble Creek Canyon			1930s	1953	
SR-80	US-89 near American Fork	US-189 in Provo Canyon	27.272	43.890	1930s	1977	Renumbered SR-92
SR-81	SR-30 south of Fielding	Main Street in Fielding	2.475	3.983	1930s	current	
SR-82	SR-102 in Tremonton	SR-13 east of Garland	3.178	5.114	1930s	current	
SR-82A	US-30S in Tremonton	SR-82 north of Tremonton			1955	1964	Now part of SR-82
SR-83	SR-13 in Corinne	I-84 at Howell	30.726	49.449	1930s	current	
SR-84					1930s	1977	Now part of SR-126
SR-85	SR-5 in Mountain Green	SR-39 near Huntsville			1930s	1945	Now part of SR-167
SR-85	SR-154 in Riverside	SR-41			1945	1953	
SR-85	I-15 in Brigham City	US-89 in Brigham City			1962	1977	Now part of U.S. Route 91
SR-85	I-15 in Lehi	I-80 in Salt Lake City	20.313	32.691	2012	current	Portions north of 4100 South and between 2100 North and Porter Rockwell Boulevard not yet complete Will eventually be a limited access freeway for entire length
SR-86	I-84	SR-65 at Henefer	2.141	3.446	1975	current	
SR-86					1930s	1969	
SR-87	US-40 in Duchesne	US-40 southwest of Roosevelt	38.159	61.411	1930s	current	
SR-88	South of Ouray	US-40 east of Fort Duchesne	16.996	27.352	1930s	current	
SR-89					1975	1977	
SR-89	SR-35 in Francis	SR-151 in Driscoll Dugway			1930s	1953	Became part of SR-151
SR-90	SR-13 in Brigham City	US-89/US-91	1.178	1.896	1975	current	
SR-90	Portage	US-191 east of Portage			1947	1969	
SR-90					1930s	1947	
SR-91					1930s	1969	
SR-92	I-15 in Lehi	US-189 in Provo Canyon	27.296	43.929	1977	current	
SR-92	SR-155 in Cleveland	Elmo		1953	1969		
SR-92	SR-155 in Cleveland	SR-10 north-northeast of Elmo		1935	1947	Prior to 1943, Elmo north to SR-10	
SR-93	I-15 south of Woods Cross	US-89	0.355	0.571	1961	current	
SR-93					1930s	1953	
SR-94	I-70	Thompson	0.958	1.542	1969	current	
SR-94	Thompson	Sego			1930s	1969	No longer part of the state highway network
SR-95	SR-24 east of Hanksville	US-191 south of Blanding	121.351	195.296	1930s	current	
SR-96	Clear Creek	US-6 near Colton	22.759	36.627	1930s	current	
SR-97	SR-37 in Hooper	Hill Air Force Base	5.347	8.605	1965	current	
SR-97	Park City	Park City			1945	1963	Now part of SR-224
SR-97	Circleville	Kingston			1930s	1945	Became part of SR-22; now part of SR-62
SR-98					1969	2000	
SR-98					1930s	1969	
SR-99	I-15 south of Fillmore	I-15 north of Fillmore	4.193	6.748	1969	current	
SR-99	US-6/US-50 in Delta	Sugarville			1930s	1969	
SR-100	SR-99 in Fillmore	US-50 west of Holden	16.934	27.253	1930s	current	
SR-101	SR-23 in Wellsville	Hardware Ranch	21.811	35.101	1930s	current	
SR-102	SR-83 east of Lampo Junction (near Promontory)	SR-38	20.072	32.303	1930s	current	
SR-103	SR-126 (North Main Street) in Clearfield	I-15 in Clearfield	0.225	0.362	1965	current	
SR-103					1935	1964	
SR-103					1930s	1935	
SR-104	SR-126	SR-204 in Ogden	3.088	4.970	1930s	current	
SR-105	SR-67 (Legacy Parkway) in Centerville	SR-106 in Centerville	1.111	1.788	1965	current	
SR-105	Santaquin	Spanish Fork			1945	1964	Legislative designation for a portion of US-6, now part of SR-198
SR-105	Sunset	South Hooper			1930s	1945	Now part of SR-37
SR-106	I-15 in West Bountiful	US-89 in Farmington	9.426	15.170	1930s	current	
SR-107	SR-110 west of West Point	3000 West in West Point	1.502	2.417	1930s	current	
SR-108	I-15 in Layton	SR-126	12.920	20.793	1930s	current	
SR-109	SR-126	US-89 in Layton	2.962	4.767	1969	current	
SR-109	West of Layton	US-91 in Layton			1930s	1969	
SR-110	SR-127 west of Syracuse	SR-37 west of Clinton	3.495	5.625	1969	current	
SR-110	Kaysville	Kaysville			1930s	1969	
SR-111	SR-209 east of Copperton	SR-201 northeast of Magna	10.596	17.053	1930s	current	
SR-112	SR-138 east of Grantsville	SR-36 in Tooele	8.603	13.845	1930s	current	
SR-113	US-189 in Charleston	US-40 in Heber City	7.141	11.492	1930s	current	
SR-114	US-89 (500 West) in Provo	US-89 (State Street) in Pleasant Grove	10.787	17.360	1930s	current	Also known as Geneva Road, and (Provo) Center Street
SR-115	SR-198 in Payson	SR-156 in Spanish Fork	8.247	13.272	1930s	current	
SR-116	SR-132 in Moroni	US-89 in Mount Pleasant	7.061	11.364	1930s	current	
SR-117	Wales	US-89	12.192	19.621	1966	current	
SR-117	SR-12 in Teasdale	Grover			1930s	1966	No longer part of state route system
SR-118	I-70/US-89	SR-24 near Sigurd	24.137	38.845	1930s	current	
SR-119	SR-118 in Richfield	SR-24 at Kings Meadow Canyon	8.753	14.087	1930s	current	
SR-120	I-70/US-89	I-70/US-89 north of Richfield	3.886	6.254	1969	current	
SR-120					1945	1969	
SR-120					1935	1945	
SR-120					1930s	1935	
SR-121	US-40 in Roosevelt	US-40 in Vernal	40.293	64.845	1930s	current	
SR-122	Near Hiawatha	SR-10	8.751	14.083	1930s	current	
SR-123	US-6/US-191 at Sunnyside Junction	East Carbon-Sunnyside	11.421	18.380	1930s	current	
SR-124	Horse Canyon Mine	SR-123	7.956	12.804	1930s	current	
SR-125	US-50/SR-136 east of Delta	SR-132 near Leamington	21.855	35.172	1930s	current	
SR-126	I-15 south of Layton	US-89 at Hot Springs Junction near Pleasant View	21.609	34.776	1977	current	
SR-126	Greenville	Greenville			1930s	1969	No longer part of the state route system
SR-127	SR-110	SR-108 in Syracuse	2.507	4.035	1965	current	
SR-127	Parowan	near Lund			1930s	1953	No longer part of the state route system
SR-128	US-191 near Moab	I-70 near Cisco	44.564	71.719	1930s	current	
SR-129	Riverside	Tremonton			1983	1989	
SR-129	Milford	Milford			1930s	1969	
SR-129	US-89 in Lindon	SR-92 in Highland	7.27	11.700	2014	current	Also known as North County Boulevard
SR-130	I-15 south of Cedar City	SR-21 north of Minersville	43.076	69.324	1930s	current	
SR-131	Woods Cross				1930s	2001	
SR-131	SR-85 in Bluffdale	SR-140 in Bluffdale	3.415	5.496	2016	current	
SR-132	US-6 in Lynndyl	US-89 at Pigeon Hollow Junction	63.132	101.601	1930s	current	
SR-133	South of Kanosh	I-15 north of Meadow	7.183	11.560	1969	current	
SR-133					1930s	1969	
SR-134	SR-37 at Kanesville	SR-235 in North Ogden	14.304	23.020	1977	current	
SR-134					1930s	1969	
SR-135					1969	1992	
SR-135					1930s	1969	
SR-135	2800 West in Lindon	SR-129 in Lindon	0.726	1.168	2016	current	Also known as Pleasant Grove Boulevard
SR-136	US-50/SR-125 east of Delta	US-6	3.059	4.923	1985	current	
SR-136					1930s	1969	
SR-137	US-89 in Gunnison	US-89 east of Gunnison	11.357	18.277 (Note: This length includes one or more branches, classified as part of the main route.)	1930s	current	
SR-138	I-80	SR-36 at Mills Junction (Tooele County)	20.444	32.901	1965	current	
SR-138					1930s	1953	
SR-139	US-6/US-191	SR-157 near Spring Glen	1.408	2.266	1930s	current	
SR-140	800 west at Bluffdale	I-15	2.559	4.118	1984	current	
SR-140	Hinckley	Deseret			1930s	1969	
SR-141	US-6 in Genola	SR-147 west of Payson	6.623	10.659	1969	current	
SR-141					1930s	1969	
SR-142	SR-23 near Newton	US-91 in Richmond	17.353	27.927	1930s	current	
SR-143	I-15 west of Parowan	US-89 in Panguitch	51.206	82.408	1930s	current	
SR-144	SR-92 in American Fork Canyon	Tibble Fork Reservoir	2.478	3.988	1978	current	
SR-144					1930s	1969	
SR-145	SR-68 in Saratoga Springs	US-89 in American Fork	5.717	9.201	1978	current	Also known as Pioneer Crossing
SR-145					1930s	1969	
SR-146	US-89 at Pleasant Grove	SR-92 near American Fork Canyon	5.306	8.539	1930s	2014	Decommissioned in exchange for creating SR-129.
SR-147	SR-141 at McBeth Corner (near Payson)	US-89	18.175	29.250	1930s	current	
SR-148	SR-14	Cedar Breaks National Monument	2.544	4.094	1985	current	
SR-148	US-6 in Lynndyl	Leamington			1930s	1969	Now part of SR-132
SR-149	US-40 at Jensen	Dinosaur National Monument	4.219	6.790	1930s	current	
SR-150	SR-32 in Kamas	Wyoming Highway 150 at the Wyoming state line near Evanston, Wyoming	54.742	88.099	1930s	current	
SR-151	SR-154	I-15	4.235	6.816	1987	current	
SR-151	US-40 in Hailstone	Keetley			1930s	1977	
SR-152	SR-71	I-215	3.044	4.899	1930s	current	
SR-153	SR-160 in Beaver	US-89 in Junction	40.488	65.159	1945	current	
SR-153					1930s	1945	
SR-154	I-15 in Draper	I-80 near Salt Lake City International Airport	24.319	39.138	1989	current	Also known as the Bangerter Highway
SR-154	Garland	Garland			1930s	1969	Garland Road
SR-155	SR-10 in Huntington	SR-10 at Washboard Junction (near Cleveland)	10.718	17.249	1930s	current	
SR-156	SR-198 in Spanish Fork	I-15	1.382	2.224	1962	current	
SR-156					1930s	1953	
SR-157	US-6/US-191 in Helper	Kenilworth	5.189	8.351	1930s	current	In 2013 a section of the former SR-244 along Poplar Street was added to SR-157 when SR-244 was deleted from the State Highway System.
SR-158	SR-39 at Eden Junction	Powder Mountain Ski Resort	11.691	18.815	1990	current	
SR-158					1930s	1969	
SR-159	SR-21 near Garrison	US-6/US-50	8.018	12.904	1979	current	
SR-159					1930s	1969	Old alignment of US-6
SR-160	I-15 (Exit 109) in Beaver	I-15 (Exit 112) in Beaver	3.808	6.128	1961	current	
SR-160					1930s	1953	
SR-161	I-70 near Cove Fort	I-15	3.084	4.963	1965	current	Formerly part of US-91
SR-161					1961	1964	
SR-161					1930s	1953	
SR-162	US-191 in Bluff	Colorado State Highway 41 at the Colorado state line near Cortez, Colorado	31.852	51.261	2004	current	
SR-162					1930s	1990	
SR-163					1986	2004	
SR-163	near Levan	near Levan			1968	1977	Formerly part of US-91, Now part of SR-78
SR-163					1930s	1966	
SR-164	I-15 (Exit 253) southwest of Spanish Fork	SR-198 (South Main Street) in Spanish Fork	2.744	4.416	1962	current	
SR-164	Petersboro	Wellsville			1930s	1953	Now part of SR-23
SR-165	Paradise	US-91 in Logan	10.722	17.255	1969	current	
SR-165					1930s	1969	
SR-166					1930s	1969	
SR-166					1969	1990	
SR-167	I-84 near Mountain Green	SR-39 south of Huntsville	11.092	17.851	1985	current	
SR-167					1930s	1969	
SR-168	Hill Air Force Base	SR-60 in Riverdale	1.160	1.867	1962	current	
SR-168					1930s	1953	
SR-169					1977	1990	
SR-169	North Salt Lake	Bountiful			1962	1977	Legislative designation for US-89 through the Bountiful area
SR-169					1930s	1953	
SR-170	SR-24 near Aurora	I-70 near Aurora			1992	1993	Renumbered SR-260
SR-170					1930s	1969	
SR-171	SR-111	I-215	15.660	25.202	1930s	current	
SR-172	Southwest of Salt Lake City	I-80	9.218	14.835	1985	current	
SR-172	Near Henefer	Near Henefer			1930s	1969	
SR-173	SR-111 southeast of Magna	US-89 in Murray	9.939	15.995	1965	current	
SR-173					1930s	1947	
SR-174	Intermountain Power Plant	US-6 south of Lynndyl	8.122	13.071	1985	current	
SR-174					1930s	1965	
SR-175	SR-154 in South Jordan	US-89 in Sandy	4.860	7.821	2008	current	11400 South in Salt Lake County.
SR-175					1930s	1969	
SR-176	SR-114 in Vineyard	Main Street in Vineyard	1.042	1.677	2017	current	
SR-176					1930s	1969	
SR-177	I-15 in Farmington	SR-193 in West Point	16.000	25.750	2024	current	West Davis Highway
SR-177	Sandy	Sandy			1965	1986	9000 South through Salt Lake County
SR-177					1930s	1963	
SR-178	I-15 (Exit 248) in Payson	SR-198 (South State Street) in Payson	1.198	1.928	2000	current	
SR-178					1930s	1969	
SR-179				1930s	1969		
SR-179	SR-138 in Erda	I-80	4.5	7.242	2017	current	Tooele Midvalley Highway
SR-180	I-15 southeast of American Fork	US-89 in American Fork	1.051	1.691	1961	current	
SR-180	near Ophir	near Ophir			1930s	1961	
SR-181	SR-152	SR-186 in Salt Lake City	6.904	11.111	1935	2007	
SR-181A	University of Utah	University of Utah			1945	1962	Legislative designation for roads on the university campus, now SR-281
SR-181A	University of Utah	University of Utah			1962	1969	Legislative designation for roads on the university campus, now SR-282
SR-182	Utah Schools for the Deaf and the Blind	Utah Schools for the Deaf and the Blind			1930s	1969	Legislative designation for roads on the campus, now SR-285 and SR-291
SR-182A	College of Eastern Utah	College of Eastern Utah			1930s	1969	Legislative designation for roads on the campus, later SR-283, but deleted in 2001
SR-183	Utah State Industrial School (now the campus of Ogden–Weber Technical College)	Utah State Industrial School			1930s	1969	Legislative designation for roads on the campus, now SR-286
SR-183A	Utah Schools for the Deaf and the Blind	Utah Schools for the Deaf and the Blind			1945	1963	Legislative designation for roads on the campus, now SR-291
SR-184	US-89 in Provo	Utah State Hospital			1930s	1963	
SR-184	US-89 in Salt Lake City	US-89	1.946	3.132	1963	2008	
SR-184A	Weber State University	Weber State University			1930s	1969	Legislative designation for roads on the campus, now SR-284
SR-185					1930s	1969	
SR-186	US-89 in Salt Lake City	I-80 near Parley's Canyon	12.355	19.883	1930s	current	
SR-187					1930s	1941	
SR-187					1941	1969	
SR-188					1930s	1969	
SR-189					1930s	1969	
SR-190	I-215 at Knudsen's Corner (Holladay)	East of Brighton	19.934	32.081	1987	current	
SR-190					1930s	1969	
SR-191					1930s	1953	
SR-192					1930s	1953	
SR-193	4500 West	US-89	11.043	17.772	1930s	current	
SR-194					1947	1969	
SR-194					1930s	1947	
SR-195	SR-266 (4500 South)	Alternate US-40 (subsequently I-80 [Exit 127])	2.566	4.130	1948	2007	
SR-195					1930s	1947	
SR-196	SR-199 immediately east of Dugway Proving Grounds	I-80 (Exit 77) at Rowley Junction	36.922	59.420	1998	current	
SR-196					1930s	1969	
SR-197	SR-73	US-89 in Lehi	1.083	1.743	1930s	2011	
SR-198	I-15 (Exit 244) in east Santaquin	US-6 at Moark Junction in west Spanish Fork	15.715	25.291	1995	current	Formerly part of US-6
SR-198	Deseret Chemical Depot	Deseret Chemical Depot			1945	1969	Now part of SR-73
SR-198					1930s	1945	
SR-199	Dugway Proving Grounds	SR-36	21.960	35.341	1969	current	
SR-199					1943	1969	
SR-199					1930s	1943	
SR-200	SR-61 in Lewiston	Idaho state line near Preston, Idaho	1.565	2.519	1930s	current	
SR-201	I-80 (Exit 102) at Lake Point Junction near Magna	Salt Lake City	16.699	26.874	1930s	current	Eastern half called 21st South Freeway. Formerly part of US-50ALT, US-40 and US-40ALT
SR-202	SR-201 (2400 South) west of Magna	I-80 (Exit 104)	1.907	3.069	1969	current	
SR-202					1961	1967	
SR-202					1930s	1953	
SR-203	US-89 near Uintah	SR-39	6.137	9.877	1941	current	
SR-203					1939	1941	
SR-204	SR-26 in Ogden	US-89	5.419	8.721	1930s	current	
SR-205					1930s	1953	
SR-205	SR-104 (former alignment on Wilson Avenue) in Ogden	SR-204 (Wall Avenue) in Ogden	1.2 (about)	1.9 (about)	1965	1969	Now part of SR-104
SR-205					1963	1964	
SR-206					1930s	1969	
SR-207					1941	1945	
SR-207					1945	1968	
SR-208	US-40 east of Fruitland	SR-35 near Tabiona	10.205	16.423	1941	current	
SR-209	Bingham Canyon Mine	SR-210 near Little Cottonwood Canyon	14.592	23.484	1969	current	
SR-209					1941	1969	
SR-210	SR-190 at Big Cottonwood Canyon	Alta	13.618	21.916	1941	current	
SR-211	Dugout Ranch	US-191 near Church Rock	18.915	30.441	1971	current	
SR-211					1968	1969	
SR-211					1941	1953	
SR-212	I-15 near Washington	Washington	1.289	2.074	1941	2012	
SR-213					1941	1969	
SR-214	I-15 in Spanish Fork	US-89 near Spanish Fork			1962	1995	Now part of US-6
SR-214					1941	1953	
SR-215					1968	1969	
SR-215					1957	1959	
SR-215					1941	1953	
SR-216					1941	1969	
SR-217					1941	1969	
SR-218	SR-23 east of Newton	US-91 in Smithfield	8.223	13.234	1941	current	
SR-219	Enterprise	SR-18	1.667	2.683	1985	current	
SR-219					1941	1969	
SR-220					1966	1990	
SR-220					1941	1957	
SR-221					1941	1969	
SR-222	SR-113 in Midway	Pine Creek Campground	3.361	5.409	2004	current	
SR-222					1941	1969	
SR-223					2001	2002	
SR-223					1941	1969	
SR-224	South of Park City	I-80 at Kimball Junction	11.597	18.664	1941	current	
SR-225	West of Farmington	SR-106 in Farmington	1.274	2.050	1964	current	
SR-225					1941	1963	
SR-226	Snow Basin Ski Lodge	SR-167	3.003	4.833	1941	current	
SR-227	I-15	SR-106 in Farmington	0.704	1.133	1964	current	
SR-227					1941	1953	
SR-228	I-15 south of Leeds	I-15 in Leeds	1.821	2.931	1981	current	
SR-228					1941	1969	
SR-229					1941	1969	
SR-230	Ogden				1941	1969	
SR-231	US-89 in Fairview	SR-31 in Fairview	0.085	0.137	2018	current	
SR-231					1945	1953	
SR-231					1941	1945	
SR-232	SR-126 in Layton	Hill Air Force Base	2.401	3.864	1941	current	
SR-233					1941	1968	
SR-234					1941	1968	
SR-235	US-89 in Ogden	SR-134 in North Ogden	3.202	5.153	1941	current	
SR-236					1941	1969	
SR-237	Utah State University in Logan	US-91 west of Hyde Park	4.805	7.733	1969	2007	
SR-237					1947	1953	
SR-237					1945	1947	
SR-238	SR-165 west of Millville	US-91 in Logan	4.687	7.543	1969	2007	
SR-238					1945	1953	
SR-239	US-91 in Logan	SR-237 in Logan	1.046	1.683	1983	2007	
SR-239					1947	1969	
SR-240	I-15/I-84	SR-38 in Honeyville	1.217	1.959	1983	current	
SR-240					1966	1969	
SR-240					1947	1953	
SR-241	SR-114 in Orem	I-15 in Orem	1.555	2.503	1969	current	
SR-241					1947	1969	
SR-242					1949	1969	
SR-243	US-89 in Logan Canyon	Beaver Mountain Ski Resort	1.427	2.297	1953	current	
SR-244	US-6/US-191 in Helper	US-6/US-191 in Helper	0.910	1.465	1953	2013	The Poplar Street portion of the former highway was added to SR-157.
SR-245					1953	1969	
SR-246					1953	1969	
SR-247					1953	1985	
SR-248	SR-224 at Park City Junction	SR-32 in Kamas	14.481	23.305	1953	current	
SR-249					1953	1969	
SR-250					1953	1969	
SR-251	US-89/US-91 in Mantua	US-89/US-91 in Mantua			1953	1969	
SR-252	US-89/US-91 in Logan	US-91 in Logan	6.755	10.871	2007	current	
SR-252					1953	1969	
SR-253					1953	1969	
SR-254					1953	1969	
SR-255	US-89/US-91 in North Salt Lake	SR-106 in Centerville			1953	1969	
SR-256	US-89 north of Salina	US-89 south of Axtell	5.595	9.004	1969	current	
SR-256					1955	1969	
SR-257	SR-21 at Milford	US-6 near Hinckley	69.246	111.441	1955	current	
SR-258	I-70/US-89 near Elsinore	SR-118 east of Elsinore	2.022	3.254	1957	current	
SR-259	SR-24 near Sigurd	I-70	0.345	0.555	1992	current	
SR-259	Arizona state line near Glen Canyon Dam	Kanab			1957	1977	Legislative designation for the re-route of US-89 due to the construction of Glen Canyon Dam
SR-260	SR-24 south of Aurora	US-50 west of Salina	4.179	6.725	1993	current	
SR-260					1957	1981	
SR-261	US-163 north of Mexican Hat	SR-95 east of Natural Bridges National Monument	32.691	52.611	1957	current	
SR-262	US-191 north of Bluff	SR-162 in Montezuma Creek	22.605	36.379	1958	current	
SR-263					1969	1985	
SR-263					1959	1969	
SR-264	SR-31	SR-96 south of Scofield	15.373	24.740	1985	current	
SR-264					1959	1969	
SR-265	SR-114 in Orem	US-189 in Provo	4.336	6.978	1961	current	Also known as University Parkway
SR-266	I-215	I-215	8.120	13.068	1961	current	
SR-267					1966	1969	
SR-267					1959	1964	
SR-268	I-15	US-89 in Salt Lake City	0.734	1.181	1960	current	
SR-269	I-15/I-80	US-89 in Salt Lake City	1.807	2.908	1960	current	
SR-270	I-15/I-80	US-89 in Salt Lake City	0.749	1.205	1960	current	
SR-271	SR-274 in Parowan	I-15 north of Paragonah	5.647	9.088	1977	current	
SR-271					1964	1977	
SR-272					1969	2001	
SR-273	US-89 north of Farmington	I-15 in Kaysville	3.084	4.963	1969	current	
SR-274	SR-143 in Parowan	I-15 north of Parowan	1.257	2.023	1975	current	
SR-275	SR-95	Natural Bridges National Monument	3.818	6.144	1975	current	
SR-276	SR-95 north of Glen Canyon National Recreation Area	SR-95 east of Glen Canyon National Recreation Area	89.814	144.542	1965	current	
SR-277	US 89 at Glen Canyon City (Big Water)	Glen Canyon National Recreation Area boundary	1.5	2.4	1964	1986	Road transferred to county
SR-278					1961	1975	
SR-279	Potash Plant along the Colorado River	US-191 north of Moab	15.178	24.427	1961	current	
SR-280	I-80 south of Coalville	Coalville	0.399	0.642	1963	current	
SR-281	SR-34 in St. George	Utah Tech University			1969	1991	
SR-282	SR-186 and local streets in Salt Lake City	University of Utah	2.944	4.738	1969	current	
SR-283					1969	2001	
SR-284	SR-203 and local streets in Ogden	Weber State University	1.717	2.763	1969	current	
SR-285	Local streets in Ogden	Ogden City School District building	0.333	0.536	1969	current	
SR-286	SR-235 in Ogden	Ogden–Weber Technical College	1.307	2.103	1969	current	
SR-287	SR-140 in Draper	Utah State Prison	0.759	1.221	1969	current	
SR-288					1969	2007	
SR-289	SR-130 in Cedar City	Southern Utah University	1.920	3.090	1969	current	
SR-290	US-89 in Ephraim	Snow College	1.165	1.875	1969	current	
SR-291	Harrison Boulevard in Ogden	Utah Schools for the Deaf and the Blind	0.565	0.909	1969	current	
SR-292	SR-68 and local streets	Salt Lake Community College	1.721	2.770	1969	current	
SR-293	SR-186	Utah State Capitol	0.383	0.616	1969	current	
SR-294					1969	current	Also signed as Center Street in Provo
SR-295					1969	2003	
SR-296	700 North in American Fork	Utah State Developmental Center	1.424	2.292	1969	current	
SR-297					1969	1999	
SR-298	Drivers' license test course in Ogden		0.900	1.448	1972	current	
SR-299	Drivers' license test course in West Valley City		1.030	1.658	1977	current	
SR-300					1972	1996	
SR-301	Steinaker State Park	US-191	2.039	3.281	1972	current	
SR-302	SR-32	Rockport State Park	3.452	5.555	1972	current	
SR-303	Goblin Valley State Park	Towards SR-24	1.770	2.849	1972	current	
SR-304	Hyrum Lake State Park	Hyrum	0.086	0.138	1972	current	
SR-305					1972	1990	
SR-306	East Canyon State Park	SR-66	0.227	0.365	1972	current	
SR-307					1972	1984	
SR-308					1972	2003	
SR-309	Towards Ferron	Millsite State Park	0.357	0.575	1972	current	
SR-310	SR-21	Minersville Reservoir	0.353	0.568	1972	current	
SR-311	US-40	Fred Hayes State Park at Starvation	3.916	6.302	1972	current	
SR-312	Willard Bay State Park	Towards Farr West	0.573	0.922	1972	current	
SR-313	Dead Horse Point State Park	US-191 near Seven Mile Canyon (near Moab)	22.506	36.220	1975	current	
SR-314	US-189	Deer Creek State Park	0.767	1.234	1974	current	
SR-315	Willard Bay State Park	US-89 in Willard	1.760	2.832	1974	current	
SR-316	Goosenecks State Park	SR-261	3.513	5.654	1975	current	
SR-317	South 2700 West in West Valley City	Calvin L. Rampton Complex	1.620	2.607	1983	current	
SR-318	SR-9	Quail Creek State Park	2.214	3.563	1992	current	
SR-319	US-40	Jordanelle State Park	1.203	1.936	1989	current	
SR-320	SR-68	Camp Williams	2.190	3.524	1992	current	
SR-900	Skull Valley	I-80 at Delle and Lakeside	16.18	26.04	1999	current	
SR-901	Skull Valley	SR-196	43.48	69.97	1999	current	

== See also ==
- Utah Scenic Byways
- 1962 Utah state route renumbering
