= Utah State Route 107 =

State highway in Utah, United States

State Route 107
- 300 North

Route information
- Maintained by UDOT
- Length: 1.502 mi (2.417 km)
- Existed: 1931–present

Major junctions
- West end: SR-110 in West Point
- East end: 3000 West in West Point

Location
- Country: United States
- State: Utah

Highway system
- Utah State Highway System; Interstate; US; State; Minor; Scenic
← SR-106	→ SR-108

State Route 107 (SR-107) is a state highway in the U.S. state of Utah that spans 1.502 miles (2.417 km) in West Point, connecting SR-110 and 3000 West. The highway is routed entirely on 300 North.

== Route description ==
The route begins at the intersection of SR-110 (4500 West) and 300 North in West Point and heads east on the latter as a two-lane highway, ending at 3000 West, a distance of 1.5 miles. The remainder of the former route from this point east is now maintained by Davis County.

== History ==
The state legislature created SR-107 in 1931, connecting SR-1 (US-91) near Clearfield with West Point; it was extended slightly west to SR-195 in 1945. Since then, although the routes at each end have changed (SR-1 is now SR-126 and SR-195 is now SR-110), SR-107 has retained the same alignment. However, due to a jurisdictional agreement between UDOT and Davis County in 2015, necessitated by the extension of SR-193 to 2000 West (SR-108), the eastern terminus of SR-107 is now located at 3000 West in West Point.

== Major intersections ==
The entire route is in West Point, Davis County.

mi	km	Destinations	Notes
0.000	0.000	SR-110 (4500 West)	Western terminus
1.502	2.417	3000 West	Eastern terminus
1.000 mi = 1.609 km; 1.000 km = 0.621 mi
