= Utah State Route 79 =

State highway in Utah, United States

State Route 79

Route information
- Maintained by UDOT
- Length: 4.869 mi (7.836 km)
- Existed: 1957–present

Major junctions
- West end: SR-108 in West Haven
- SR-126 in Roy; I-15 / I-84 in Ogden; US 89 in Ogden
- East end: SR-203 in Ogden

Location
- Country: United States
- State: Utah

Highway system
- Utah State Highway System; Interstate; US; State; Minor; Scenic
← SR-78	→ I-80

State Route 79 (SR-79) is a state highway in the U.S. state of Utah that spans 4.174 miles (6.717 km) in Ogden, Weber County, with another 0.77 miles (1.24 km) consisting of the westbound segment of a brief one-way pair. The route connects SR-126 and I-15 to US-89 and SR-203 as it passes through the center of Ogden on Hinckley Drive and portions of 30th and 31st Streets. The highway was formed in 1957, initially routed from SR-38 (then running on Pennsylvania Avenue) east to SR-204 (Wall Avenue). It was subsequently extended west to SR-126 and east to Harrison Boulevard (SR-203), before being extended west again to SR-108.

== Route description ==
SR-79 begins at an intersection with SR-108 in West Haven and proceeds east on Hinckley Drive, with two lanes in each direction separated by a center turn lane. It climbs a hill and crosses the former alignment of the Denver and Rio Grande Western Railroad, entering the city limits of Roy. It then crosses the Union Pacific and FrontRunner railroad tracks on a bridge more than 300 feet (91 m) long; the girders on this bridge were the largest steel girders ever installed in Utah on a non-freeway project. SR-79 then comes to a junction (Nye's Corner) with SR-126 (1900 West) and enters the city limits of Ogden. The highway turns slightly to northeast on Hinckley Drive and gains a center median, straddling the northern periphery of Ogden-Hinckley Airport. Before intersecting 1325 West the road loses division of its lanes. Passing the intersection of Pennsylvania Avenue the road turns east, gains a lane in each direction and intersects at a diamond interchange with I-15. Past Parker Drive the road again briefly turns northeast and climbs onto a viaduct over railroad tracks. The termination of the viaduct begins the one-way pair of SR-79, with 30th Street forming the westbound segment and 31st Street the eastbound segment. The pair continues for 0.5 miles (0.80 km) until reaching Washington Boulevard (US-89), where 31st Street loses state maintenance and SR-79 continues on 30th Street, now a two-way street. The two-lane highway continues east until reaching Harrison Boulevard (SR-203), where SR-79 ends.

The portion of the route east of I-15 is included in the National Highway System.

== History ==
State Route 79 was established on May 14, 1957, then traveling from Pennsylvania Avenue (at that time SR-38) northeast to Wall Avenue (SR-204). In 1958, the route was extended east to Washington Boulevard (US-91, now US-89) via 31st and Patterson Streets (the latter located in between 31st and 30th Streets). In 1966 a portion of SR-38 between SR-84 (now SR-126) was transferred to SR-79. In 1970 a portion of 30th Street between US-91 and SR-203 was relinquished by Ogden and the state assumed responsibility. By 1979 Patterson Avenue was given back to the city and in 1994 30th Street between Washington Boulevard west to 31st Street became the westbound segment of SR-79.

In fall 2009, over eight years after it had been first proposed, construction began on an extension of Hinckley Drive west to Midland Drive (SR-108). The road opened in August 2010, and SR-79 was extended to its current terminus at that time.

== Major intersections ==
The entire route is in Weber County.

Location	mi	km	Destinations	Notes
West Haven	0.000	0.000	SR-108 (Midland Drive)	Western terminus
Roy	0.745	1.199	SR-126 (1900 West)	
Ogden	1.850	2.977	Pennsylvania Avenue	Former SR-38
Ogden	2.355– 2.645	3.790– 4.257	I-15 / I-84 – Salt Lake City, Brigham City	Interchange
Ogden	3.298	5.308	SR-204 (Wall Avenue)	
Ogden	3.728	6.000	US 89 (Washington Boulevard)	
Ogden	4.869	7.836	SR-203 (Harrison Boulevard)	Eastern terminus
1.000 mi = 1.609 km; 1.000 km = 0.621 mi
