= Utah State Route 136 =

State highway in Utah, United States

State Route 136

Route information
- Maintained by UDOT
- Length: 3.059 mi (4.923 km)
- Existed: 1985–present

Major junctions
- South end: US 50 / SR-125 east of Delta
- North end: US 6 northeast of Delta

Location
- Country: United States
- State: Utah

Highway system
- Utah State Highway System; Interstate; US; State; Minor; Scenic
| ← SR-135 | → SR-137 |

State Route 136 (SR-136) is a 3.059-mile (4.923 km) long state highway in the U.S. state of Utah. It runs from a junction with U.S. Route 50 (US-50) and SR-125 to US-6.

== Route description ==
The route begins at an intersection with US-50 and SR-125. West of the SR-136, this road is signed as US-50, and eastward it is signed as SR-125. The continuation beyond this point southward is also signed as US-50. From this intersection, SR-136 heads north through a desert landscape and passes the Delta Municipal Airport. It turns slightly northwest to meet US 6, which is oriented southwest–northeast.

== History ==
A former designation for the route was established in 1933 and ran from SR-259 near Kanab and headed north to SR-11 (now US-89) at Alton Junction near Alton. This designation was removed by 1969. The current designation was implemented by 1985.

== Major intersections ==
The entire route is in Millard County.

| Location | mi | km | Destinations | Notes |
|---|---|---|---|---|
| | 0.000 | 0.000 | US 50 / SR-125 – Holden, Delta, Oak City | Southern terminus |
| | 3.059 | 4.923 | US 6 – Delta, Ely, Lynndyl | Northern terminus |
1.000 mi = 1.609 km; 1.000 km = 0.621 mi
