= Utah State Route 237 =

Former state highway in Utah, United States

State Route 237
- SR-237 highlighted in red

Route information
- Maintained by UDOT
- Length: 4.805 mi (7.733 km)
- Existed: 1969–2007

Major junctions
- South end: Utah State University in Logan
- North end: US 91 in Hyde Park

Location
- Country: United States
- State: Utah

Highway system
- Utah State Highway System; Interstate; US; State; Minor; Scenic

State Route 237 (SR-237) was a state highway in the U.S. state of Utah. From 1969 to 2007, it ran from Utah State University in Logan to U.S. Route 91 (US-91) in Hyde Park.

== Route description ==
SR-237 began on the campus of Utah State University in Logan, at the intersection of 700 North and 800 East (Lars Hansen Drive). The route ran north along the western side of the campus, intersecting SR-288 at 1000 North and passing by Romney Stadium (now Maverik Stadium). After an intersection with SR-239 at 1400 North, the route exited the university campus and entered the city of North Logan.

The route followed 800 East throughout North Logan, mostly serving agricultural and residential areas. After approximately 1.84 miles (2.96 km), the route entered Hyde Park as 250 East. It turned west on 200 South and then north on Main Street in order to serve the central intersection of Hyde Park, before making a final turn west on Center Street. The street name briefly changed to Hyde Park Lane before the route ended at US-91.

== History ==
When SR-237 was created in 1969, it followed much of its final alignment except at the south end. The original southern terminus of SR-237 was at 400 North (US-89); from there, the route ran north on 600 East and east on 1000 North before continuing its later alignment north on 800 East. However, the portion on 600 East and 1000 North was seen as more characteristic of a city street than a state highway, and it was deleted in a 1981 mileage swap in exchange for the creation of SR-239 along 1400 North. This left the south end of SR-237 at 800 East and 1000 North in Logan. It was extended south in 1991 to 700 North, absorbing a portion of SR-288.

In 2007, the Utah Transportation Commission designated SR-252 along 1000 West and 2500 North, which would be a western bypass to alleviate traffic along US-91 through downtown Logan. In exchange for the creation of this route, a number of state routes in the Logan area were removed from the state highway system, including SR-237. The old routing is now inventoried as Federal Aid Route 1267.

== Major intersections ==
The entire route was in Cache County.

Location	mi	km	Destinations	Notes
Logan	0.000	0.000	700 North	Southern terminus
Logan	0.381	0.613	SR-288 (1000 North)	
Logan	0.876	1.410	SR-239 (1400 North)	
Hyde Park	4.805	7.733	US 91	Northern terminus
1.000 mi = 1.609 km; 1.000 km = 0.621 mi
