= Utah State Route 37 =

State highway in Utah, United States

State Route 37

Route information
- Maintained by UDOT
- Length: 12.351 mi (19.877 km)
- Existed: 1915 as a state highway; 1927 as SR-37–present

Major junctions
- South end: SR-126 in Sunset
- SR-108 in Clinton; SR-97 in Hooper
- North end: SR-108 in Roy

Location
- Country: United States
- State: Utah

Highway system
- Utah State Highway System; Interstate; US; State; Minor; Scenic
← SR-36	→ SR-38

State Route 37 (SR-37) is a state highway in the U.S. state of Utah, forming a 270° loop through the western part of the Ogden-Clearfield metropolitan area. The route is 12.35 miles (19.88 km).

When the road was added to the state highway system in 1915 and numbered in 1927, it formed a connection from Ogden to Hooper. However, after a series of changes, SR-37 does not enter Ogden and extends further south to Sunset.

== Route description ==
SR-37 begins at SR-126 (Main Street) in Sunset, just west of I-15, though the nearest access to the Interstate is more than a mile (1.5 km) away. It first heads west on 1800 North, passing through Clinton and West Point before turning north at 5000 West, which becomes 5900 West when it crosses from Davis County into Weber County. Beyond Hooper, SR-37 turns east onto 4000 South, which leads through West Haven and to the border with Roy at SR-108. SR-37 ends there, but the road continues to SR-126 at Ogden-Hinckley Airport, 3.5 miles (5.5 km) north of SR-37's south end.

The entire route is located in the flat plain between Ogden Bay (Great Salt Lake) in the Great Salt Lake and the Wasatch Range. The area was formerly served by the Denver and Rio Grande Western Railroad's Hooper Branch from Roy.

== History ==
The road from Ogden southwest to Hooper, via 24th Street, Midland Drive, 4000 South, and 5900 West, was added to the state highway system in 1915, and assigned the SR-37 designation by the state legislature in 1927. The legislature added a connection from US-91 (now SR-26) at "Dead Man's Curve" in Roy north along 1900 West, Hinckley Drive, and Pennsylvania Avenue to SR-37 at Hooper Junction in 1923 and numbered it State Route 38 in 1927. The piece of SR-37 east of Hooper Junction, mostly on 24th Street, was transferred to SR-38 in 1931. That same year, State Route 105 was created, initially running from US-91 (now SR-126) in Sunset east to SR-49 (which by the mid-1930s was US-89) in South Weber. It was extended west from Sunset to South Hooper in 1933, and in 1941 the original portion east of Sunset, which now lies inside Hill Air Force Base, was deleted. SR-37 and SR-105 were connected in 1935 by SR-195, which connected to the former at Hooper, the latter at South Hooper, and continued south and east to SR-108 in Syracuse. A 1945 extension of SR-37 absorbed SR-105 and part of SR-195, creating the present three-quarter loop, though it was about three miles (5 km) longer than the present extent, due to the north end being at Hooper Junction. In 1953, the north–south piece of SR-38 on 1900 West (south of Nye's Corner, the intersection with Hinckley Drive) became an extension of SR-84 (now SR-126).

Until 1964, SR-39 left downtown Ogden by heading east on 24th Street, north on Harrison Boulevard (now SR-203), and east on Valley Drive to Ogden Canyon. That year, it was moved to a new connection from 12th Street to the canyon. The portion on 24th Street became an extension of SR-37 to SR-203, which also replaced the easternmost portion of SR-38 between Hooper Junction and Washington Boulevard (US-89/US-91, now solely US-89). This left SR-38 as a short route on Hinckley Drive and Pennsylvania Avenue between SR-84 at Nye's Corner and SR-37 at Hooper Junction. With the construction of I-15, Pennsylvania Avenue was no longer useful as a state highway, and so it was given to the city of Ogden in 1966. The remainder of SR-38, on Hinckley Drive, became an extension of SR-79. The state legislature truncated SR-37 to its present length in 1969. The portion from Hooper Junction (where I-15 now crossed) to US-89/US-91 in Ogden became a new SR-53, the piece southwest of SR-84 became an extension of SR-108, and the roadways in between and east of US-89/US-91 were removed from the state highway system.

== Major intersections ==
County	Location	mi	km	Destinations	Notes
Davis	Sunset	0.000	0.000	SR-126 (Main Street)	Southern Terminus
Davis	Clinton	1.995	3.211	SR-108 (2000 West)	
Davis	West Point	4.025	6.478	SR-177 (West Davis Corridor)	Future Northern Terminus of SR-177
Davis	West Point	4.508	7.255	SR-110 (4500 West)	Northern Terminus of SR-110
Weber	Hooper	6.690	10.767	SR-97 (5500 South)	Western Terminus of SR-97
Weber	West Haven	10.024	16.132	SR-134 (4700 West)	Southern Terminus of SR-134
Weber	West Haven–Roy city line	12.351	19.877	SR-108 (Midland Drive)	Northern Terminus
1.000 mi = 1.609 km; 1.000 km = 0.621 mi
