= Utah State Route 109 =

Highway in Layton, Utah

State Route 109
- SR-109 highlighted in red

Route information
- Maintained by UDOT
- Length: 2.962 mi (4.767 km)
- Existed: 1931–present

Major junctions
- West end: SR-126 in Layton
- East end: US 89 in Layton

Location
- Country: United States
- State: Utah
- Counties: Davis

Highway system
- Utah State Highway System; Interstate; US; State; Minor; Scenic
← SR-108	→ SR-110

State Route 109 (or SR-109) is a state highway in the U.S. state of Utah. The route serves as an east–west connector in the city of Layton in Davis County.

== Route description ==
SR-109 begins at the intersection of SR-126 (Main Street) and Gentile Street in the historic section of Layton, close to the historic Utah Central Railroad and the current-day Union Pacific Railroad, and the Layton Frontrunner station. From here, the route travels east along Gentile Street, almost immediately crossing I-15 via an overpass, after which it passes by the Layton city offices and Layton High School. From this point onwards, the route primarily passes by residential subdivisions, crossing Fort Lane and Fairfield Road, the two primary north–south roads in the area. Shortly after Fairfield, the route splits off from Gentile Street, becoming Oak Hills Drive as it continues east-northeast, climbing into the foothills of the Wasatch Mountains, where it ends at a diamond interchange with US 89.

== History ==
SR-109 was originally established in 1931 as the road from SR-1 (US 91) westerly for four miles along what is now Gentile Street in Layton.

In 1969, the route was moved to the east along the same street (Gentile Street) to its current alignment.

In 2021, the at-grade intersection with US 89 at SR-109's eastern terminus was replaced with a grade-separated diamond interchange as part of a major project to reconstruct US 89 as a six-lane freeway between I-15 in Farmington and I-84 in Uintah.

== Major intersections ==
The entire route is in Layton, Davis County.

mi	km	Destinations	Notes
0.000	0.000	SR-126 (Main Street)	Western terminus, road continues west as Gentile Street
0.125– 0.180	0.201– 0.290	Bridge over I-15	
0.442	0.711	Fort Lane	
1.107	1.782	Fairfield Avenue	
2.962	4.767	US 89	Interchange; eastern terminus; US 89 exit 401
1.000 mi = 1.609 km; 1.000 km = 0.621 mi
