= Utah State Route 197 (1935–2011) =

Former state highway in Utah, United States

State Route 197
- 500 West

Route information
- Maintained by UDOT
- Length: 1.1 mi (1.8 km)
- Existed: 1935–2011

Major junctions
- South end: SR-73 in Lehi
- North end: US 89 in Lehi

Location
- Country: United States
- State: Utah

Highway system
- Utah State Highway System; Interstate; US; State; Minor; Scenic
← SR-196	→ SR-198

State Route 197 (SR-197) was a state highway in the U.S. state of Utah. Also known as 500 West, it spanned 1.1 miles (1.8 km) in the city of Lehi, connecting Main Street and State Street.

== Route description ==
State Route 197 started at the intersection of Main Street (SR-73) and 500 West in the city of Lehi. From here, it traveled north along 500 West through primarily suburban and rural neighborhoods, crossing the tracks for the FrontRunner commuter rail, and ending at its intersection with State Street (US-89) approximately 1.1 miles (1.8 km) later.

== History ==
State Route 197 was designated in 1935, as running from Route 1 (now US-89) in Lehi south for one mile. It was extended in 1943 to run to what was then numbered SR-68 (renumbered as SR-73 since then). The route remained unchanged until 2011, when it was deleted from the state highway system.

== Major intersections ==
The entire route was in Lehi, Utah County.

mi	km	Destinations	Notes
0.0	0.0	SR-73 (Main Street)	Southern terminus
1.1	1.8	US 89 (State Street)	Northern terminus
1.000 mi = 1.609 km; 1.000 km = 0.621 mi
