= Clearfield Canal Trail =

Trail in Utah, United States

Coordinates: 41.096276°N 111.987832°W

- Length: 3 mi (4.8 km)
- Location: Clearfield, Utah; United States
- Trailheads: North 1200 West; East 200 South; East 300 North; West 650 North
- Use: Biking, Hiking, Walking
- Surface: Asphalt

The Clearfield Canal Trail is a 3-mile-long (4.8 km) trail that parallels the Davis Weber Canal within Clearfield, Utah, United States. It begins at North 1200 West (University Park Boulevard) and travels northwest, roughly along the course of the canal. Along its path, it crosses South 1500 East and Bernard Fisher Highway (SR-193/South 700 East) before crossing twice over the canal. The trail temporarily ends at East 200 South, immediately east of I-15, but resumes at East 300 North (on the west side of I-15. After crossing Bruce Street, it reaches West 650 North (SR-103), with North Main Street (SR-126 to the west and I-15 to the east). There are eventual plans to connect the two sections of the trail.
