= Utah State Route 127 =

State highway in Utah, United States

State Route 127
- 1700 South

Route information
- Maintained by UDOT
- Length: 2.507 mi (4.035 km)
- Existed: 1965–present

Major junctions
- West end: SR-110 in Syracuse
- SR-177 in Syracuse
- East end: SR-108 in Syracuse

Location
- Country: United States
- State: Utah

Highway system
- Utah State Highway System; Interstate; US; State; Minor; Scenic
← SR-126	→ SR-128

State Route 127 is a state highway in the state of Utah that spans 2.507 miles (4.035 km) within Syracuse in Davis County.

== Route description ==
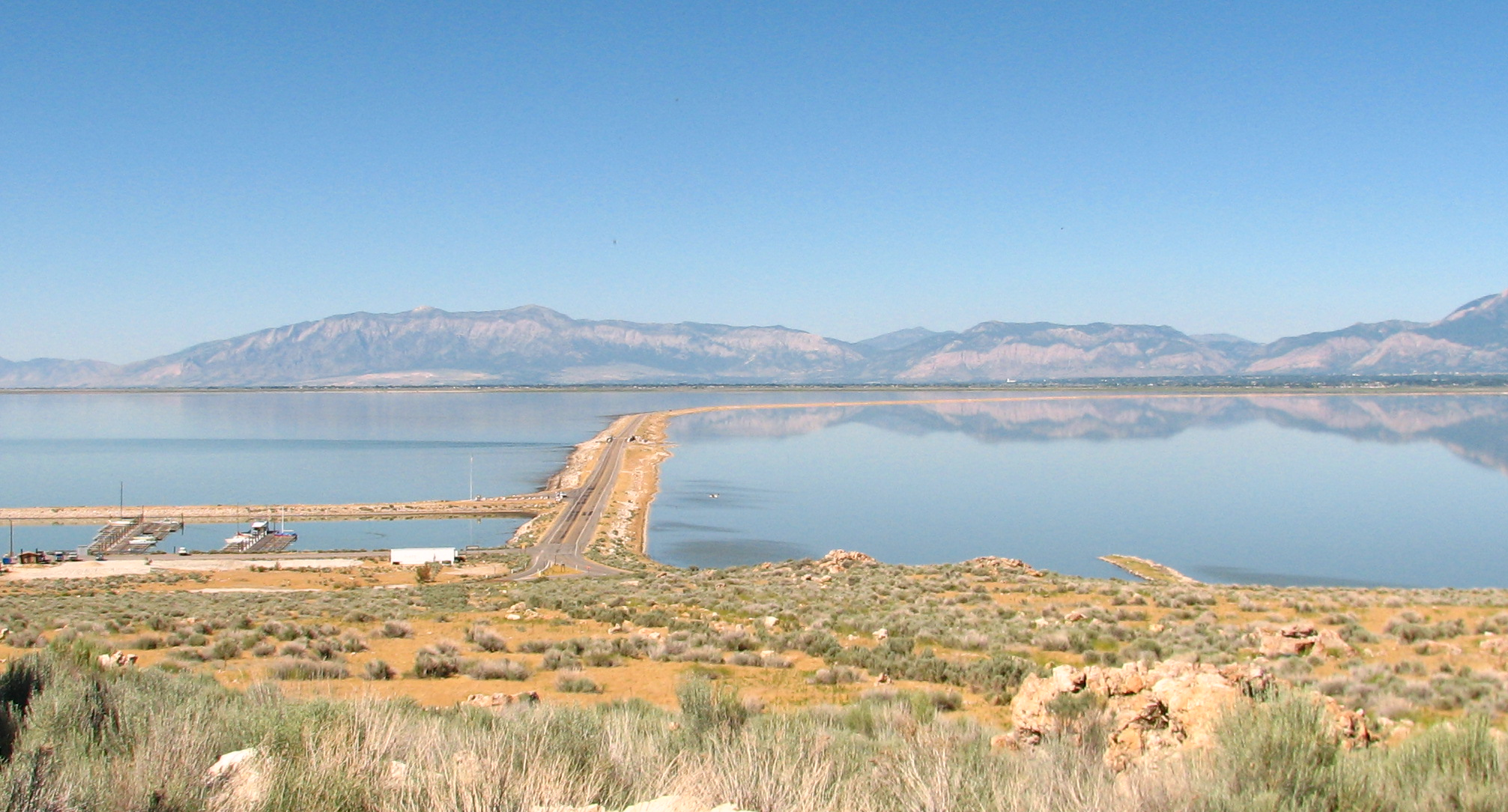
Former SR-127 on the Davis County Causeway

The western terminus of the route is at the intersection of SR-110 (4500 West) and 1700 South (west of SR-127, 1700 South becomes the Davis County Causeway, a causeway over the Great Salt Lake that provides access to Antelope Island). The route continues east, having a single-point urban interchange with the West Davis Corridor (SR-177) until it ends at SR-108 (2000 West), while 1700 South continues east along SR-108.

== History ==
The part of 1700 South east of 2000 West in Syracuse was added to the state highway system in 1931 as SR-108, a designation it still carries. From 2000 West to 4500 West, the road became a state highway in 1935, but with a different number - SR-195 (which turned north on 4500 West to Hooper). The entire length of SR-195 was removed from the state highway system in 1947, but was re-added in the 1960s. A new State Route 127 was designated in 1965, following the 1700 South portion of former SR-195 and continuing west to the north end of Antelope Island via the Antelope Island Causeway; 4500 West was restored in 1969 as a new SR-110. The causeway was closed in June 1983 due to high water in the Great Salt Lake, and in 1991 the state legislature passed a law to fund a reconstruction through the Utah Division of Parks and Recreation. The Utah Transportation Commission gave the causeway to Davis County that year to make it possible for a toll to be charged, leaving SR-127 running only from SR-110 east to SR-108. The new causeway opened in July 1993, ten years after the old one had been closed.

== Major intersections ==
The entire route is in Syracuse, Davis County.

mi	km	Destinations	Notes
0.000	0.000	SR-110 (4500 West)	Western terminus
1.680	2.704	SR-177 (West Davis Corridor)	Single-point urban interchange
2.507	4.035	SR-108 (2000 West)	Eastern terminus
1.000 mi = 1.609 km; 1.000 km = 0.621 mi
