= Utah State Route 53 =

State highway in Utah, United States

State Route 53
- 24th Street
- SR-53 highlighted in red

Route information
- Maintained by UDOT
- Length: 1.949 mi (3.137 km)
- Existed: 1969–present

Major junctions
- West end: I-15 / I-84 in Ogden
- East end: US 89 in Ogden

Location
- Country: United States
- State: Utah

Highway system
- Utah State Highway System; Interstate; US; State; Minor; Scenic
← SR-52	→ SR-54

State Route 53 (SR-53) is a 1.949-mile-long (3.137 km) state highway in the U.S. state of Utah, connecting Interstate 15 (I-15) and I-84 with U.S. Route 89 (US-89) via Ogden's 24th Street. SR-53 was created in 1969 as a remnant of SR-37, which was truncated to its current length at that time.

== Route description ==
SR-53 begins at exit 342 of I-15, and heads northeast of Pennsylvania Avenue before curving east into 24th Street. A viaduct built in about 1970 takes the road over the Weber River, the Union Pacific Railroad's Ogden Yard at the old Union Station, and SR-204 (Wall Avenue). Two blocks after SR-53 returns to ground level, it ends at US-89. The entire route is in the Weber Valley, which locally slopes down towards the Weber River.

== History ==
24th Street west of SR-1 (US-91, now US-89) was added to the state highway system in 1915, becoming part of SR-37 in 1927 and SR-38 in 1931, only to be given back to SR-37 in 1964 (along with former SR-39 on 24th Street east of US-89). The state legislature removed parts of SR-37 from the state highway system in 1969, renumbering the portion between I-15 and US-89 as State Route 53.

== Major intersections ==
The entire route is in Ogden, Weber County.

mi	km	Destinations	Notes
0.000– 0.095	0.000– 0.153	I-15 south / I-84 east – Salt Lake I-15 north / I-84 west – Pocatello (Idaho)	Western terminus; interchange (I-15/I-84 Exit 342); southbound entrance, northbound exit
1.625	2.615	SR-204 (Wall Avenue)	Interchange; westbound exit and eastbound entrance
1.949	3.137	US 89 (Washington Boulevard)	Eastern terminus
1.000 mi = 1.609 km; 1.000 km = 0.621 mi: Incomplete access
