= Utah State Route 26 =

State highway in Utah, United States

State Route 26
- Riverdale Road

Route information
- Maintained by UDOT
- Length: 3.724 mi (5.993 km)
- Existed: 1969 as SR-50; renumbered 1977–present

Major junctions
- West end: SR-126 in Roy
- I-15 in Riverdale; I-84 in Riverdale; SR-60 in Riverdale; SR-204 in South Ogden
- East end: US 89 in Ogden

Location
- Country: United States
- State: Utah
- County: Weber

Highway system
- Utah State Highway System; Interstate; US; State; Minor; Scenic
← SR-25	→ SR-28

State Route 26 (SR-26) is a state highway in northern Utah running for 3.724 miles (5.993 km) in Weber County from Roy to Ogden. It serves as a diagonal route through the Ogden suburbs and the primary connector from northbound I-15 to eastbound I-84 and westbound I-84 to southbound I-15.

== Route description ==
SR-26 begins at an intersection with SR-126 in Roy and heads northeast through the Ogden suburbs on Riverdale Road, intersecting I-15 and I-84 in close proximity in Riverdale before continuing to end at an intersection with US-89 in Ogden.

== History ==
State Route 50
- Location: Roy–Ogden
- Existed: 1969–1977

The road from Roy to Ogden and north from was added to the state highway system in 1910, and in the 1920s it became part of US-91. In 1974, US-91 was truncated through the area, and the piece of old US-91 between SR-84 (now SR-126) in Roy and US-89 in Ogden became State Route 50. In the 1977 renumbering, SR-50 was renumbered to SR-26 (to avoid confusion with US-50).

== Major intersections ==
The entire route is in Weber County.

Location	mi	km	Destinations	Notes
Roy	0.000	0.000	SR-126 (1900 West)	Western terminus
Riverdale	0.366– 0.481	0.589– 0.774	I-15 south – Salt Lake City	SR-26 to southbound I-15; northbound I-15 to SR-26
Riverdale	0.926– 1.042	1.490– 1.677	I-84 to I-15 north – Ogden, Brigham City	
Riverdale	1.334	2.147	SR-60 east (1050 West) – South Weber	
South Ogden	3.042	4.896	SR-204 north (Wall Avenue)	
Ogden	3.724	5.993	US 89 (Washington Boulevard)	Eastern terminus
1.000 mi = 1.609 km; 1.000 km = 0.621 mi: Incomplete access
