= South Willard, Utah =

- CDP
- Location within Box Elder County and the State of Utah.

- Location of Utah in the United States
- Coordinates: 41°22′20″N 112°02′17″W
- Country: United States
- State: Utah
- County: Box Elder
- Named for: Willard Richards

Area
  - Total: 5.8 sq mi (15.1 km^{2})
  - Land: 5.8 sq mi (15.1 km^{2})
  - Water: 0 sq mi (0.0 km^{2})
- Elevation: 4,278 ft (1,304 m)

Population (2020)
  - Total: 1,840
  - Density: 316/sq mi (122/km^{2})
- Time zone: UTC-7 (Mountain (MST))
  - Summer (DST): UTC-6 (MDT)
- FIPS code: 49-71255
- GNIS feature ID: 2408779

South Willard is a census-designated place (CDP) in Box Elder County, Utah, United States. The population was 1,840 at the 2020 census.

== Geography ==
According to the United States Census Bureau, the CDP has a total area of 5.8 square miles (15.1 km^{2}), all land.

== Demographics ==
Historical population
| Census | Pop. | Note | %± |
|---|---|---|---|
| 2000 | 586 | | — |
| 2010 | 1,571 | | 168.1% |
| 2020 | 1,840 | | 17.1% |

=== 2020 census ===
As of the 2020 census, South Willard had a population of 1,840. The median age was 36.4 years. 33.3% of residents were under the age of 18 and 9.0% of residents were 65 years of age or older. For every 100 females there were 106.3 males, and for every 100 females age 18 and over there were 103.1 males age 18 and over.

89.1% of residents lived in urban areas, while 10.9% lived in rural areas.

There were 568 households in South Willard, of which 45.6% had children under the age of 18 living in them. Of all households, 69.7% were married-couple households, 14.4% were households with a male householder and no spouse or partner present, and 10.6% were households with a female householder and no spouse or partner present. About 15.2% of all households were made up of individuals and 4.8% had someone living alone who was 65 years of age or older.

There were 571 housing units, of which 0.5% were vacant. The homeowner vacancy rate was 0.0% and the rental vacancy rate was 1.2%.

Racial composition as of the 2020 census
| Race | Number | Percent |
|---|---|---|
| White | 1,634 | 88.8% |
| Black or African American | 5 | 0.3% |
| American Indian and Alaska Native | 11 | 0.6% |
| Asian | 15 | 0.8% |
| Native Hawaiian and Other Pacific Islander | 6 | 0.3% |
| Some other race | 36 | 2.0% |
| Two or more races | 133 | 7.2% |
| Hispanic or Latino (of any race) | 158 | 8.6% |

=== 2000 census ===
As of the census of 2000, there were 586 people, 209 households, and 156 families residing in the CDP. The population density was 100.6 people per square mile (38.9/km^{2}). There were 228 housing units at an average density of 39.2/sq mi (15.1/km^{2}). The racial makeup of the CDP was 95.22% White, 1.19% Native American, 0.17% Asian, 1.87% from other races, and 1.54% from two or more races. Hispanic or Latino of any race were 5.12% of the population.

There were 209 households, out of which 39.2% had children under the age of 18 living with them, 66.5% were married couples living together, 6.7% had a female householder with no husband present, and 24.9% were non-families. 23.0% of all households were made up of individuals, and 7.7% had someone living alone who was 65 years of age or older. The average household size was 2.80 and the average family size was 3.34.

In the CDP, the population was spread out, with 29.0% under the age of 18, 12.3% from 18 to 24, 29.4% from 25 to 44, 17.4% from 45 to 64, and 11.9% who were 65 years of age or older. The median age was 31 years. For every 100 females, there were 104.2 males. For every 100 females age 18 and over, there were 104.9 males.

The median income for a household in the CDP was $43,214, and the median income for a family was $45,000. Males had a median income of $36,607 versus $20,938 for females. The per capita income for the CDP was $16,560. About 9.5% of families and 7.4% of the population were below the poverty line, including 8.2% of those under age 18 and 3.1% of those age 65 or over.

== See also ==
- List of census-designated places in Utah
