= Utah State Route 125 =

State highway in Utah, United States

State Route 125

Route information
- Maintained by UDOT
- Length: 21.855 mi (35.172 km)
- Existed: 1931 (as SR-126, renumbered in 1933)–present

Major junctions
- South end: US 50 / SR-136 east of Delta
- North end: SR-132 near Leamington

Location
- Country: United States
- State: Utah

Highway system
- Utah State Highway System; Interstate; US; State; Minor; Scenic
← SR-124	→ SR-126

Utah State Route 125 (SR-125) is a state highway in the U.S. state of Utah. Spanning 21.8 miles (35.1 km), it converts the town of Oak City in Millard County with the city of Delta and US-50 to the west, and the town of Leamington to the north.

== Route description ==
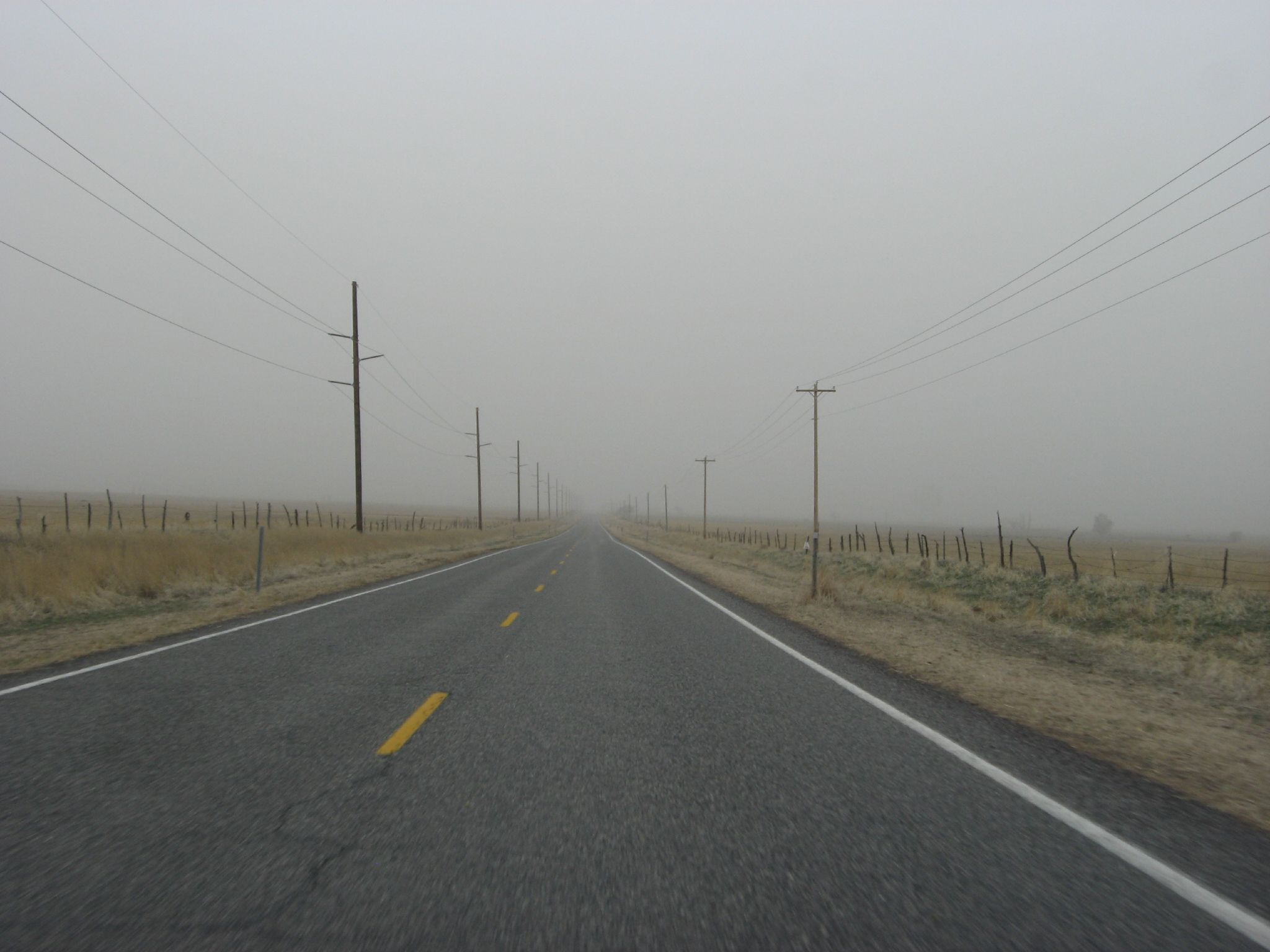
SR-125

State Route 125 starts about 3 miles (4.8 km) east of Delta, at the intersection of US-50 and SR-136, and from there heads east towards Oak City. As the route approaches Oak City, it turns to the north before passing through the town as Main Street. After leaving town, the route gradually turns to the northeast before turning north again to enter the town of Leamington, ending at its intersection with SR-132.

== History ==
The road from Lynndyl south to Oak City was originally designated as State Route 126 in 1931, and renumbered to State Route 125 in 1933. In 1953, the route was extended from its southern terminus in Oak City, taking over the western portion of Utah State Route 135 from Oak City to Delta. In addition, the original portion of the highway from Oak City north to Lynndyl was rerouted instead to run north to Leamington, some 5.5 miles (8.9 km) to the east, which reflects the current alignment of the route.

== Major intersections ==
The entire route is in Millard County.

Location	mi	km	Destinations	Notes
	0.000	0.000	US 50 / SR-136 – Delta, Holden, Lynndyl	Western terminus
Leamington	21.855	35.172	SR-132 (Main Street)	Northern terminus
1.000 mi = 1.609 km; 1.000 km = 0.621 mi
