= Utah State Route 187 =

Utah State Route 187 may refer the Utah State Highway that served the Utah State Prison (first the Sugar House Prison and then the Utah State Prison before it was deleted as a route) :

- Utah State Route 187 (1935-1941)
- Utah State Route 187 (1941-1969)
