= Utah State Route 97 =

Highway in Weber County, Utah

State Route 97
- SR-97 highlighted in red

Route information
- Maintained by UDOT
- Length: 5.347 mi (8.605 km)
- Existed: 1965–present

Major junctions
- West end: SR-37 in Hooper
- I-15 in Roy
- East end: Northeast gate at Hill Air Force Base

Location
- Country: United States
- State: Utah
- Counties: Weber

Highway system
- Utah State Highway System; Interstate; US; State; Minor; Scenic
← SR-96	→ SR-99

Utah State Route 97 is a state highway in the U.S. state of Utah. It is a 5.347-mile (8.605 km) road in Weber County, starting as a minor arterial in the west and increasing to a major collector road in the east that runs from Hooper through Roy to the northwest gate of Hill Air Force Base.

== Route description ==
The route's western terminus is in Hooper at the intersection of SR-37 (5900 West) and 5500 South. From here it travels east as 5500 South towards Roy. After approximately 2.6 miles (4.2 km), just west of SR-108 (3500 West), the route shifts to the south by one block, becoming 5600 South. It continues to the east through Roy, through an interchange with I-15, and ends just east of the interstate at the Hill Air Force Base northwest gate.

== History ==
State Route 97 was originally created in 1965 as a short (0.25 miles (0.40 km)) major access road between SR-106/US-91 (now I-15) and Hill Air Force Base. In 1969, it was extended westward 2 miles (3.2 km) along 5600 South to SR-108 (3500 West).

From 1969 to 2000, State Route 98 ran on 5500 South from SR-37 (5900 West) in Hooper to SR-108. This put its eastern terminus just one block north of the western terminus of SR-97. By 2000, a construction project was completed that connected the two roads at a common intersection by shifting the east end of SR-98 south by a block. In response, the state legislature consolidated the two routes by deleting SR-98 and transferring it to SR-97, resulting in the current alignment.

== Major intersections ==
The entire route is in Weber County.

Location	mi	km	Destinations	Notes
Hooper	0.000	0.000	SR-37 (5900 West)	Western terminus
Roy	3.084	4.963	SR-108 (3500 West)	
Roy	5.095	8.200	SR-126 (1900 West)	
Roy	5.213– 5.318	8.390– 8.558	I-15 – Ogden, Salt Lake City	I-15 exit 338 Southbound/338A Northbound
Roy	5.347	8.605	Fence line of Hill Air Force Base northwest gate	Eastern terminus
1.000 mi = 1.609 km; 1.000 km = 0.621 mi
