= Utah State Route 126 =

State highway in Utah, United States

State Route 126
- SR-126 highlighted in red

Route information
- Maintained by UDOT
- Length: 21.586 mi (34.739 km)
- Existed: 1935 as SR-84; renumbered 1977–present

Major junctions
- South end: I-15 in Layton
- SR-108 in Layton; SR-193 in Clearfield; SR-39 in Marriott-Slaterville; I-15 / I-84 in South Willard
- North end: US 89 in South Willard

Location
- Country: United States
- State: Utah

Highway system
- Utah State Highway System; Interstate; US; State; Minor; Scenic
| ← SR-125 | → SR-127 |

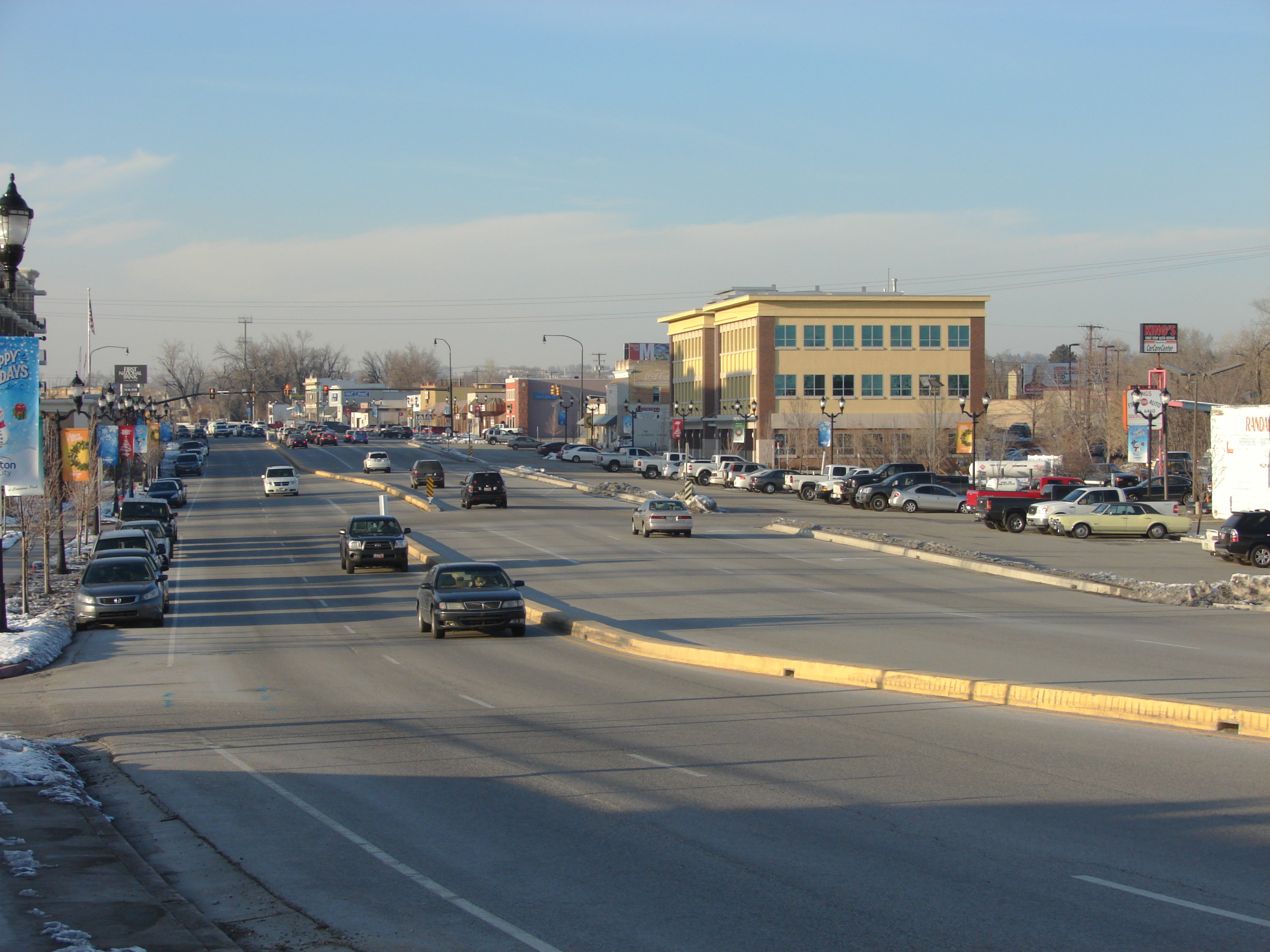
Layton

State Route 126 (SR-126) is a highway completely within the Ogden-Clearfield metropolitan area in northern Utah that makes a loop around Interstate 15 in its more than twenty-one mile path. The street is given the names Layton Parkway, Main Street, 1900 West and 2000 West respectively from south to north. Previous to 1977, SR-126 was a road in southern Utah. A portion of the highway is an old routing of US-91.

== Route description ==
After its southern terminus, the route heads northwest in Layton. After entering Clearfield, the route turns straight to the north. It continues this direction through Sunset, Roy, and West Haven before veering to the northwest when the highway reaches Marriott-Slaterville. The route again reverts to a northerly direction before reaching Farr West. Just before terminating in South Willard, the route turns northeast one final time.

The entirety of the route, with the exception of a small portion from the Interstate 15/Interstate 84 junction to the northern terminus, lies west of the aforementioned interstates.

== History ==
The portion of what is now numbered SR-126 from the southern terminus to the junction with SR-26 was previously part of US-91. The northern portion of what is now SR-126 was numbered State Route 84 starting in 1953. In 1974, US-91 was eliminated throughout most of Utah, and SR-84 absorbed the portion of former US-91 from Layton to Roy.

The 1977 Utah state route renumbering was implemented, in part, to eliminate instances where a state route used the same number as a U.S. Route or Interstate route in the state. As the 84 designation was also in use for Interstate 84 most of SR-84 was renumbered to SR-126. The only change from then to now was a portion of the old highway that was relinquished to be used by the city of Layton for parking lots in 1991.

== Major intersections ==
| County | Location | mi | km | Destinations | Notes |
|---|---|---|---|---|---|
| Davis | Layton | 0.000 | 0.000 | Fort Lane | Southern terminus |
| Davis | Layton | 0.111– 0.200 | 0.179– 0.322 | I-15 – Salt Lake City, Ogden | I-15 exit 330 |
| Davis | Layton | 0.624 | 1.004 | SR-109 east (Gentile Street) | Western Terminus of SR-109 |
| Davis | Layton | 1.700 | 2.736 | SR-232 east (Hill Field Road) | |
| Davis | Layton | 3.320 | 5.343 | SR-108 (Antelope Drive) – Antelope Island | |
| Davis | Clearfield | 4.557 | 7.334 | SR-193 east (700 South) | |
| Davis | Clearfield | 7.741 | 12.458 | 300 North | Former SR-107 |
| Davis | Clearfield | 6.084 | 9.791 | SR-103 east (650 North) to I-15 | |
| Davis | Sunset | 7.237 | 11.647 | SR-37 west (1800 North) | Southern Terminus of SR-37 |
| Weber | Roy | 8.738 | 14.062 | SR-97 (5600 South) | |
| Weber | Roy | 9.126 | 14.687 | SR-26 east (Riverdale Road) to I-15 / I-84 | Western Terminus of SR-26 |
| Weber | Roy | 11.247 | 18.100 | SR-79 east (Hinckley Drive) | Western Terminus of SR-79 |
| Weber | Roy | 11.743 | 18.899 | SR-108 west (Midland Drive) | Northern Terminus of SR-108 |
| Weber | West Haven | 13.344 | 21.475 | SR-104 east (Wilson Lane) | |
| Weber | Marriott-Slaterville | 14.459 | 23.270 | SR-39 (12th Street) | |
| Weber | Farr West | 18.721 | 30.129 | SR-134 (2700 North) | |
| Box Elder | South Willard | 21.011– 21.264 | 33.814– 34.221 | I-15 / I-84 – Salt Lake City, Brigham City | I-15 exit 351 |
| Box Elder | Hot Springs Junction | 21.506 | 34.611 | US 89 – Brigham City, Logan | Northern terminus |
1.000 mi = 1.609 km; 1.000 km = 0.621 mi
