= Utah State Route 108 =

State highway in Utah, United States

State Route 108

Route information
- Maintained by UDOT
- Length: 12.920 mi (20.793 km)
- Existed: 1931–present

Major junctions
- South end: I-15 in Layton
- SR-127 in Syracuse; SR-37 in Clinton SR-97 in Roy SR-37 in Roy
- North end: SR-126 in Roy

Location
- Country: United States
- State: Utah

Highway system
- Utah State Highway System; Interstate; US; State; Minor; Scenic
← SR-107	→ SR-109

State Route 108 (SR-108) is a state highway in the U.S. state of Utah that spans 12.920 miles (20.793 km) in Davis and Weber Counties. The road connects I-15 and Layton to Syracuse and Clinton before terminating at SR-126 in Roy. The entire route is within the Ogden-Clearfield metropolitan area.

== Route description ==
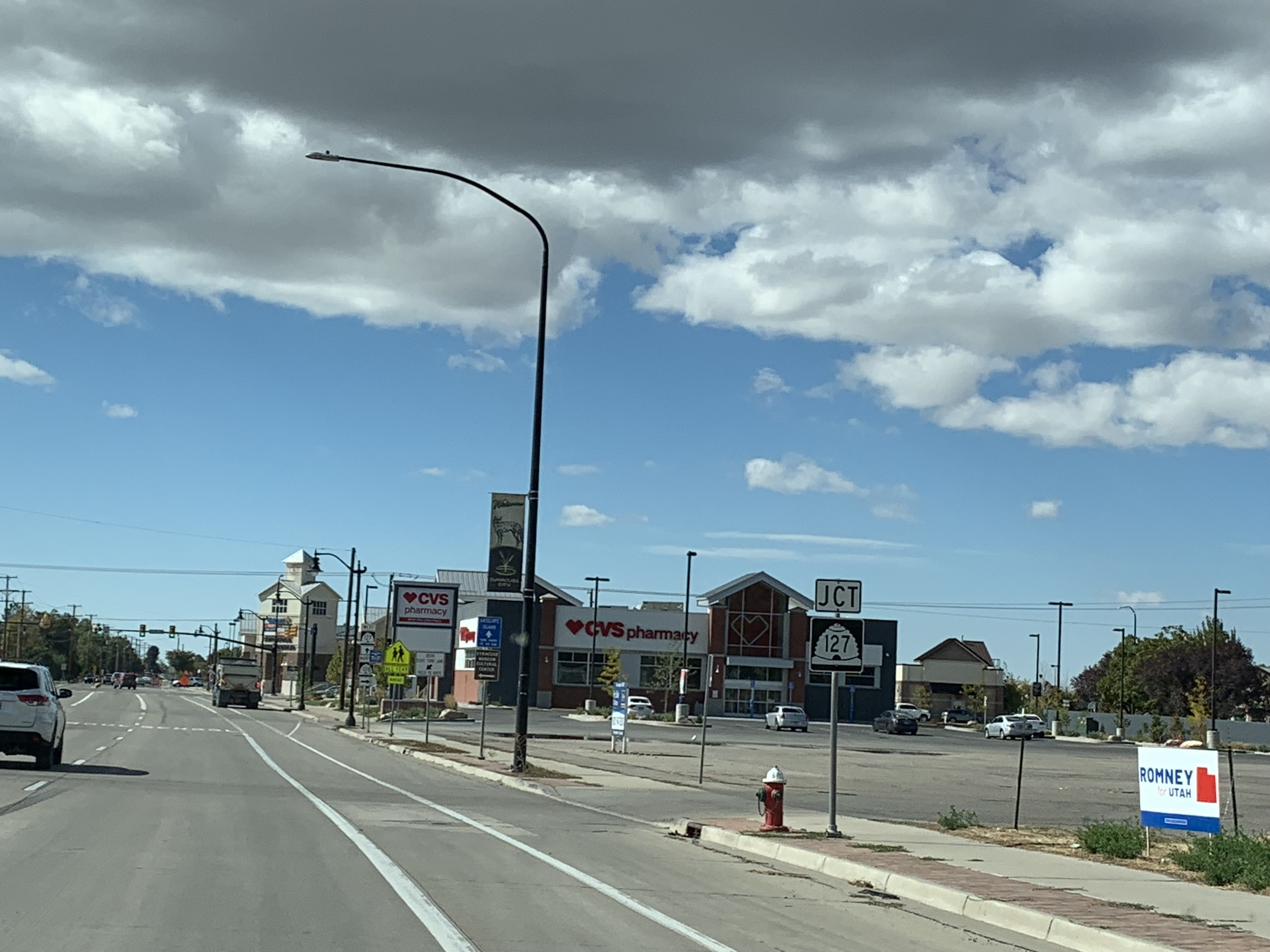
SR 108 approaching its junction with SR 127 in Syracuse, October 2018

The route starts out in the city of Layton in Davis County, just east of I-15, initially going west along Antelope Drive, named for Antelope Island, which is accessed via this road. After traveling west for four miles (6 km), the route turns north onto 2000 West, while SR-127 continues west to the island. During its northern stretch, the route passes through the cities of Syracuse and Clinton, before entering Weber County and the city of Roy. In Roy, the route continues north until just after 4800 South, turning to the northeast along Midland Drive. It generally continues in this direction until the northern terminus at SR-126.

== History ==
The state legislature created SR-108 in 1931, running west from SR-1 (now SR-126) to Syracuse. A 1941 law extended it east from SR-1 to SR-232 in Layton and north from Syracuse to SR-37. As part of a 1969 truncation of SR-37, SR-108 was extended northeast over part of that route to SR-84 (now SR-126). The final change was made in 1996, when the piece between SR-232 and I-15 was given to the city of Layton for widening.

== Major intersections ==
County	Location	mi	km	Destinations	Notes
Davis	Layton	0.000	0.000	University Park Boulevard	Southern terminus
Davis	Layton	0.071– 0.273	0.114– 0.439	I-15 – Salt Lake City, Ogden	I-15 exit 332
Davis	Layton	0.694	1.117	SR-126 (Main Street)	
Davis	Syracuse	4.007	6.449	SR-127 (1700 South)	
Davis	Syracuse	6.001	9.658	300 North	Former SR-107
Davis	Clinton	7.508	12.083	SR-37 (1800 North)	
Weber	Roy	9.009	14.499	SR-97 (5600 South)	
Weber	Roy	11.339	18.248	SR-37 (4000 South)	Northern Terminus of SR-37
Weber	Roy	12.920	20.793	SR-126 (1900 West)	Northern terminus
1.000 mi = 1.609 km; 1.000 km = 0.621 mi

== See also ==
- List of state highways in Utah
