= Sunset, Utah =

City in Utah, United States

- City
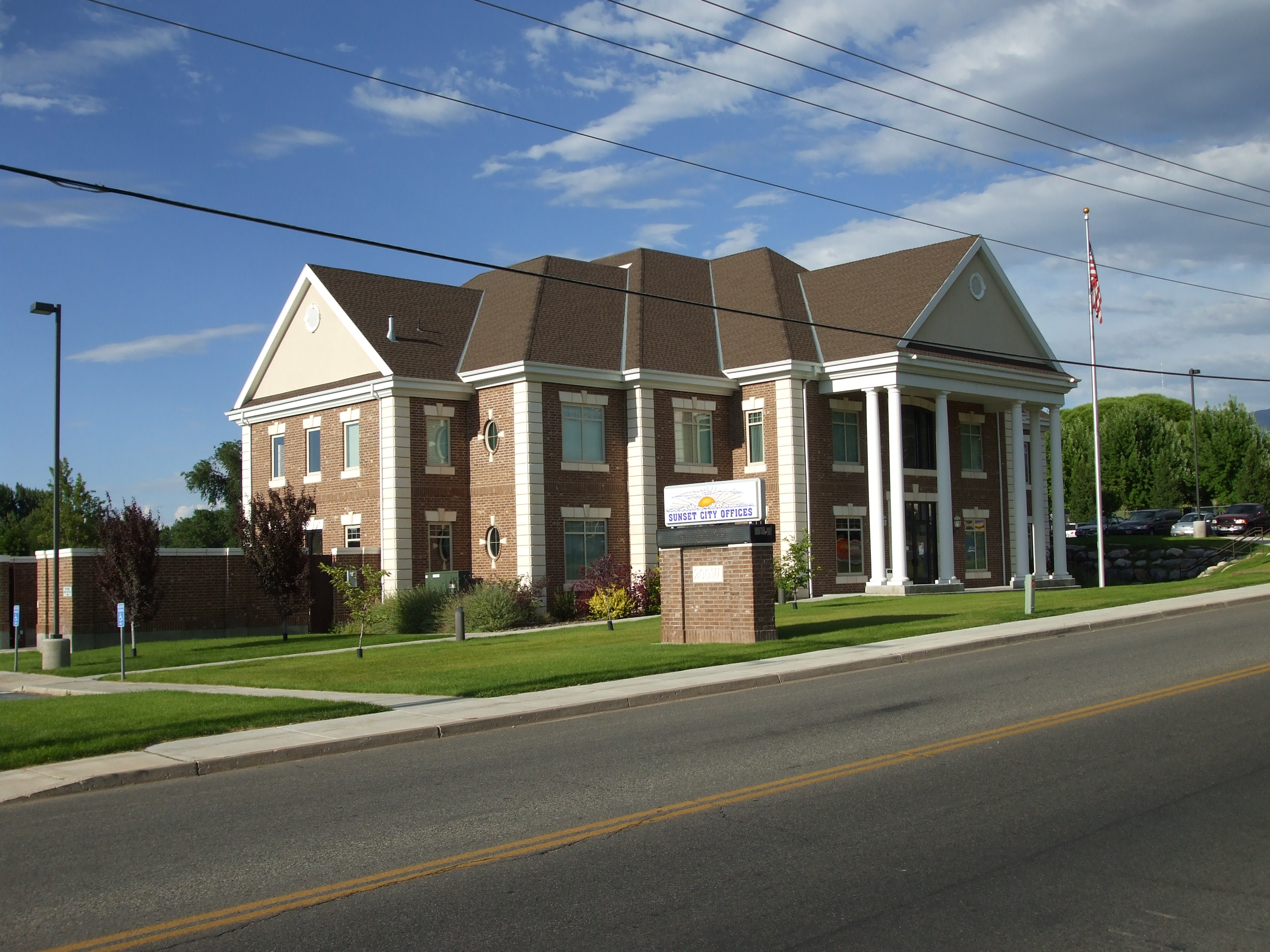
- Sunset City Offices

- Location in Davis County and the state of Utah
- Coordinates: 41°08′21″N 112°01′43″W
- Country: United States
- State: Utah
- County: Davis
- Incorporated: 1935

Area
  - Total: 1.46 sq mi (3.79 km^{2})
  - Land: 1.46 sq mi (3.78 km^{2})
  - Water: 0.0039 sq mi (0.01 km^{2})
- Elevation: 4,531 ft (1,381 m)

Population (2020)
  - Total: 5,475
  - Density: 3,670.7/sq mi (1,417.28/km^{2})
- Time zone: UTC-7 (Mountain (MST))
  - Summer (DST): UTC-6 (MDT)
- ZIP code: 84015
- Area codes: 385, 801
- FIPS code: 49-74480
- GNIS feature ID: 2412013
- Website: sunsetut.gov

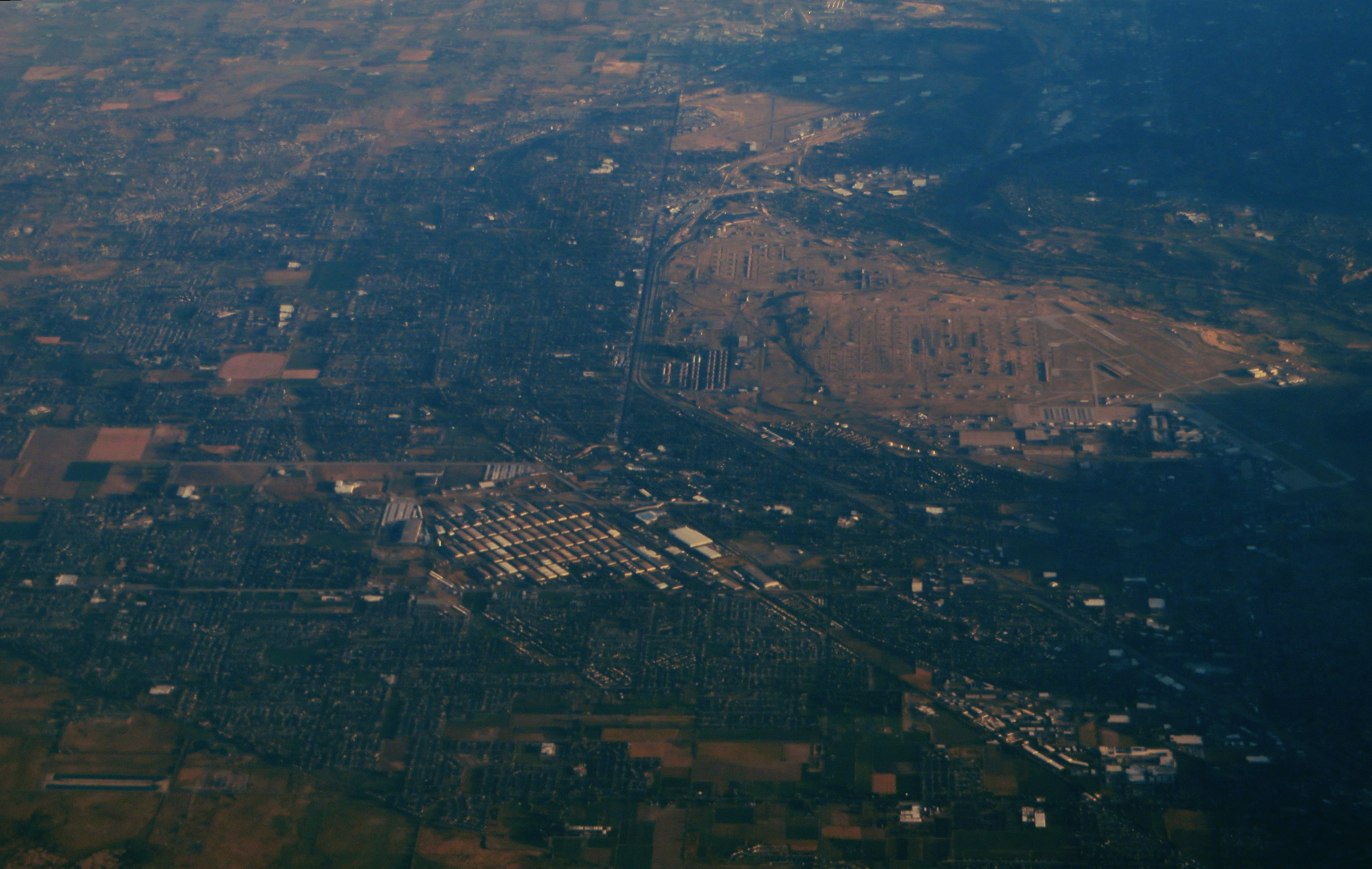
Sunset from the air, 2015

Sunset is a city in Davis County, Utah, United States. It is part of the Ogden–Clearfield, Utah Metropolitan Statistical Area. The population was 5,475 at the 2020 census.

Sunset emerged as a distinct place in 1916.

== Geography ==
Sunset is located in northern Davis County. It is bordered by Hill Air Force Base to the east, Clearfield to the south, Clinton to the west, and Roy in Weber County to the north.

According to the United States Census Bureau, the city of Sunset has a total area of 1.3 square miles (3.4 km^{2}), all land.

== Demographics ==
Historical population
Census	Pop.	Note	%±
1940	276		—
1950	993		259.8%
1960	4,235		326.5%
1970	6,268		48.0%
1980	5,733		−8.5%
1990	5,128		−10.6%
2000	5,204		1.5%
2010	5,122		−1.6%
2020	5,475		6.9%
U.S. Decennial Census

=== 2020 census ===
As of the 2020 census, Sunset had a population of 5,475. The median age was 30.6 years. 27.9% of residents were under the age of 18 and 11.1% of residents were 65 years of age or older. For every 100 females there were 106.6 males, and for every 100 females age 18 and over there were 104.7 males age 18 and over.

100.0% of residents lived in urban areas, while 0.0% lived in rural areas.

There were 1,818 households in Sunset, of which 41.6% had children under the age of 18 living in them. Of all households, 49.7% were married-couple households, 18.5% were households with a male householder and no spouse or partner present, and 23.5% were households with a female householder and no spouse or partner present. About 19.6% of all households were made up of individuals and 7.2% had someone living alone who was 65 years of age or older.

There were 1,892 housing units, of which 3.9% were vacant. The homeowner vacancy rate was 0.6% and the rental vacancy rate was 5.0%.

Racial composition as of the 2020 census
Race	Number	Percent
White	4,268	78.0%
Black or African American	68	1.2%
American Indian and Alaska Native	51	0.9%
Asian	93	1.7%
Native Hawaiian and Other Pacific Islander	47	0.9%
Some other race	459	8.4%
Two or more races	489	8.9%
Hispanic or Latino (of any race)	1,030	18.8%

=== 2010 census ===
As of the 2010 census, there were 5,122 people, 1,734 households, and 1,298 families residing in the city. The population density was 3,909.9 people per square mile (1,510.9/km^{2}). There were 1,826 housing units at an average density of 1,393.9 per square mile (538.6/km^{2}). The racial makeup of the city was 83.33% White, 1.44% African American, 0.68% Native American, 2.38% Asian, 0.29% Pacific Islander, 7.18% from other races, and 4.69% from two or more races. Hispanic or Latino of any race were 15.33% of the population.

There were 1,734 households, out of which 43.9% had children under the age of 18 living with them, 52.1% were married couples living together, 14.0% had a female householder with no husband present, 66.5% of those with no husband lived with children, and 25.1% of households were non-families. 12.7% of all households were made up of individuals, and 7.4% had someone living alone who was 65 years of age or older. The average household size was 2.95 and the average family size was 3.37.

In the city, the population was spread out, with 31.8% under the age of 18, 9.2% from 18 to 24, 29.5% from 25 to 44, 17.2% from 45 to 64, and 12.2% who were 65 years of age or older. The median age was 29 years. For every 100 females, there were 102.8 males. For every 100 females age 18 and over, there were 97.9 males.

=== 2018 American Community Survey ===
According to the 2018 American Community Survey, the median income for a household in the city was $59,476, and a per capita income of $25,380. Males had median earnings of $38,500 versus $25,160 for females. About 7.1% of families and 11% of the population were below the poverty line, including 10.9% of those under age 18 and 4.5% of those age 65 or over.
