= West Point, Utah =

City in Utah, United States

- City
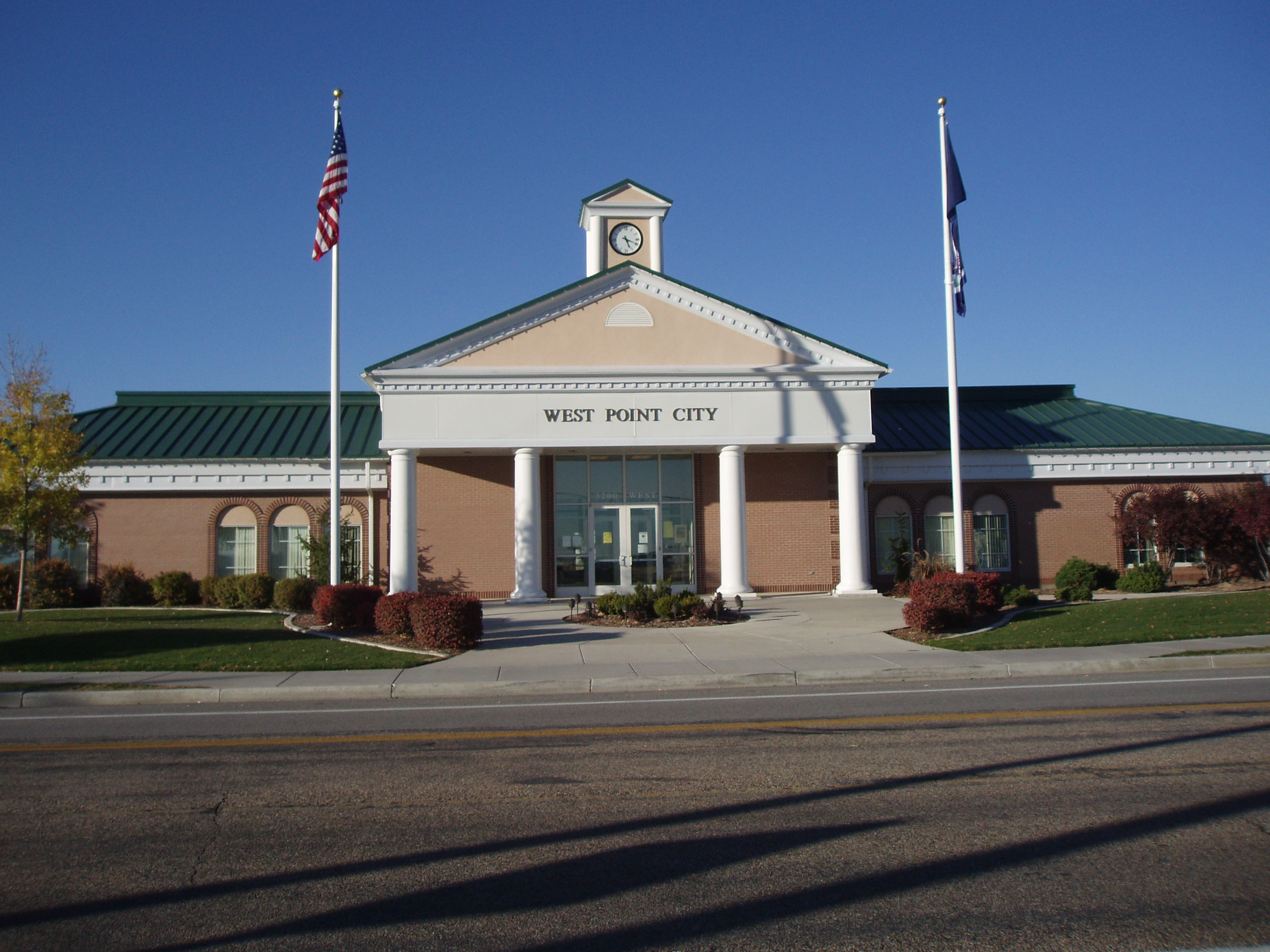
- West Point City Municipal Center

- Location in Davis County and the state of Utah
- Coordinates: 41°07′42″N 112°06′48″W
- Country: United States
- State: Utah
- County: Davis
- Settled: 1867
- Incorporated: 1935

Area
  - Total: 7.14 sq mi (18.50 km^{2})
  - Land: 7.12 sq mi (18.43 km^{2})
  - Water: 0.027 sq mi (0.07 km^{2})
- Elevation: 4,288 ft (1,307 m)

Population (2020)
  - Total: 10,963
  - Density: 1,540.1/sq mi (594.64/km^{2})
- Time zone: UTC-7 (Mountain (MST))
  - Summer (DST): UTC-6 (MDT)
- ZIP code: 84015
- Area codes: 385, 801
- FIPS code: 49-83390
- GNIS feature ID: 2412226
- Website: www.westpointutah.gov

West Point is a city in Davis County, Utah, United States. It is part of the Ogden–Clearfield, Utah Metropolitan Statistical Area. The population was 9,511 at the 2010 census, up from 6,033 in 2000. The population in the 2020 census was 10,963. The city has experienced quick growth centered primarily around single-family residential construction.

West Point was first settled in March 1867. The community was named after the United States Military Academy at West Point. Before it was incorporated, the region was informally called "South Hooper" and "Muskrat Springs".

== Geography ==
West Point is located along the eastern shoreline of the Great Salt Lake, and an extensive network of wetlands is strung along the western boundaries. These areas are essential to migrating birds.

The cities of Clinton and Hooper are located to the north, Clearfield is to the east, and the city of Syracuse is to the south.

According to the United States Census Bureau, the city has a total area of 7.3 square miles (19.0 km^{2}), of which 7.3 square miles (18.9 km^{2}) is land and 0.04 square miles (0.1 km^{2}), or 0.55%, is water. The official annexation policy plan of the city would allow for the city to add a few more square miles to its territory. This area is located in the northwest corner of Davis County and is currently unincorporated.

== Demographics ==
Historical population
| Census | Pop. | Note | %± |
|---|---|---|---|
| 1900 | 227 | | — |
| 1910 | 337 | | 48.5% |
| 1920 | 396 | | 17.5% |
| 1930 | 572 | | 44.4% |
| 1940 | 586 | | 2.4% |
| 1950 | 433 | | −26.1% |
| 1960 | 599 | | 38.3% |
| 1970 | 1,020 | | 70.3% |
| 1980 | 2,170 | | 112.7% |
| 1990 | 4,258 | | 96.2% |
| 2000 | 6,033 | | 41.7% |
| 2010 | 9,511 | | 57.6% |
| 2020 | 10,963 | | 15.3% |
U.S. Decennial Census

=== 2020 census ===
As of the 2020 census, West Point had a population of 10,963. The median age was 32.6 years. 32.8% of residents were under the age of 18 and 9.5% of residents were 65 years of age or older. For every 100 females there were 103.3 males, and for every 100 females age 18 and over there were 101.9 males age 18 and over.

97.6% of residents lived in urban areas, while 2.4% lived in rural areas.

There were 3,137 households in West Point, of which 48.5% had children under the age of 18 living in them. Of all households, 75.5% were married-couple households, 9.8% were households with a male householder and no spouse or partner present, and 11.4% were households with a female householder and no spouse or partner present. About 10.1% of all households were made up of individuals and 4.0% had someone living alone who was 65 years of age or older.

There were 3,174 housing units, of which 1.2% were vacant. The homeowner vacancy rate was 0.2% and the rental vacancy rate was 3.4%.

Racial composition as of the 2020 census
| Race | Number | Percent |
|---|---|---|
| White | 9,515 | 86.8% |
| Black or African American | 78 | 0.7% |
| American Indian and Alaska Native | 88 | 0.8% |
| Asian | 207 | 1.9% |
| Native Hawaiian and Other Pacific Islander | 49 | 0.4% |
| Some other race | 264 | 2.4% |
| Two or more races | 762 | 7.0% |
| Hispanic or Latino (of any race) | 892 | 8.1% |

=== 2000 census ===
As of the census of 2000, there were 6,033 people, 1,645 households, and 1,495 families residing in the city. The population density was 840.2 people per square mile (324.4/km^{2}). There were 1,699 housing units at an average density of 236.6 per square mile (91.4/km^{2}). The racial makeup of the city was 94.73% White, 0.41% African American, 0.53% Native American, 1.01% Asian, 0.03% Pacific Islander, 1.56% from other races, and 1.72% from two or more races. Hispanic or Latino of any race were 4.03% of the population.

There were 1,645 households, out of which 58.3% had children under the age of 18 living with them, 82.2% were married couples living together, 6.1% had a female householder with no husband present, and 9.1% were non-families. 7.2% of all households were made up of individuals, and 2.2% had someone living alone who was 65 years of age or older. The average household size was 3.67 and the average family size was 3.86.

In the city, the population was spread out, with 38.3% under the age of 18, 9.9% from 18 to 24, 30.0% from 25 to 44, 17.0% from 45 to 64, and 4.9% who were 65 years of age or older. The median age was 27 years. For every 100 females, there were 103.9 males. For every 100 females age 18 and over, there were 102.3 males.

The median income for a household in the city was $56,985, and the median income for a family was $58,869. Males had a median income of $40,770 versus $26,343 for females. The per capita income for the city was $18,080. About 2.9% of families and 3.9% of the population were below the poverty line, including 5.5% of those under age 18 and 2.7% of those age 65 or over.

== Schools ==
- West Point Elementary School
- Lakeside Elementary School
- Island View Elementary School
- West Point Junior High School
