= Unsigned highway =

Highways that do not identify the route number

Reference routes are a class of highways in New York that are only identified by small inventory markers like this. This marker is designating New York State Route 940U in East Rochester.

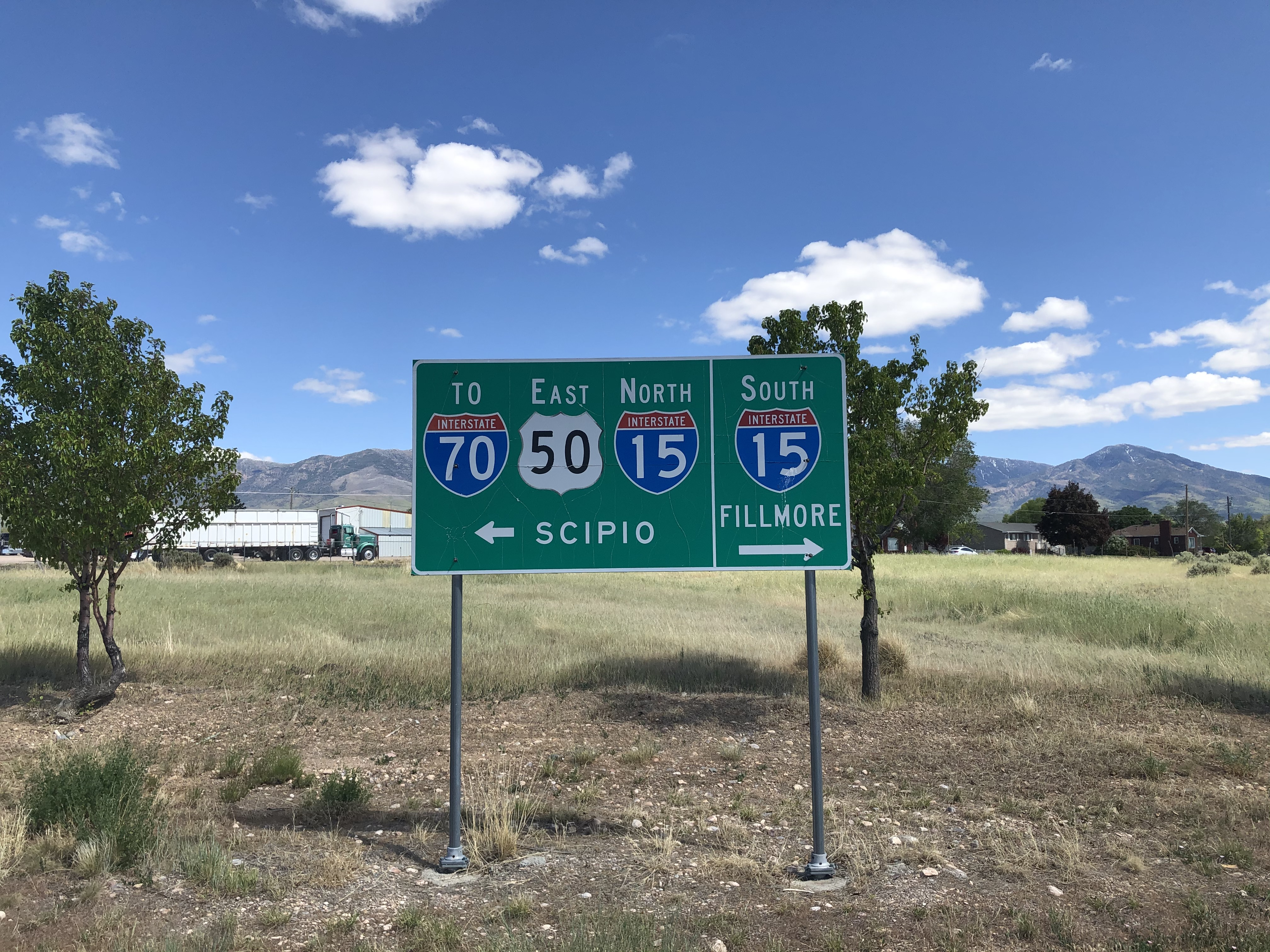
Sign at the junction of U.S. Route 50 with Utah State Route 64 in Holden, Utah. SR 64 is a short connector between US 50 and Interstate 15. This sign emphasizes the connection to the freeway, omitting the actual numbered designation of the road.

An unsigned highway is a highway that has been assigned a route number, but does not bear road markings that would conventionally be used to identify the route with that number. Highways are left unsigned for a variety of reasons, and examples are found throughout the world. Depending on the policy of the agency that maintains the highway, and the reason for not signing the route, the route may instead be signed a different designation from its actual number, with small inventory markers for internal use, or with nothing at all.

== Background ==
There are a variety of cases where roads are officially designated, but have no markings to show that designation. Many highway maintenance agencies assign some form of number to all highways, bridges, and other features they maintain for tracking and inventory purposes. However, policies vary regarding how and when to publicly post these assigned numbers. Several highway maintenance agencies have multiple numbering systems for the different classes of routes they maintain (freeways, expressways, rural roads, etc.). In such cases, one or more class of numbers may be reserved for minor routes and these may or may not be signed. Often roads that serve as a connector to a major highway are signed to show the connection to the major road, rather than the road's actual designation. Some highways are not signed to avoid multiple designations, such as when the entire route runs concurrent with other highways. There are several instances where a route has officially been given a name by government agencies, and is signed with that name, but the route is also assigned a number by the highway maintenance agencies as to fit in their maintenance and inventory systems. Another common reason to not sign a highway is where the highway is government maintained, but is of little value to the general public.

== Examples ==
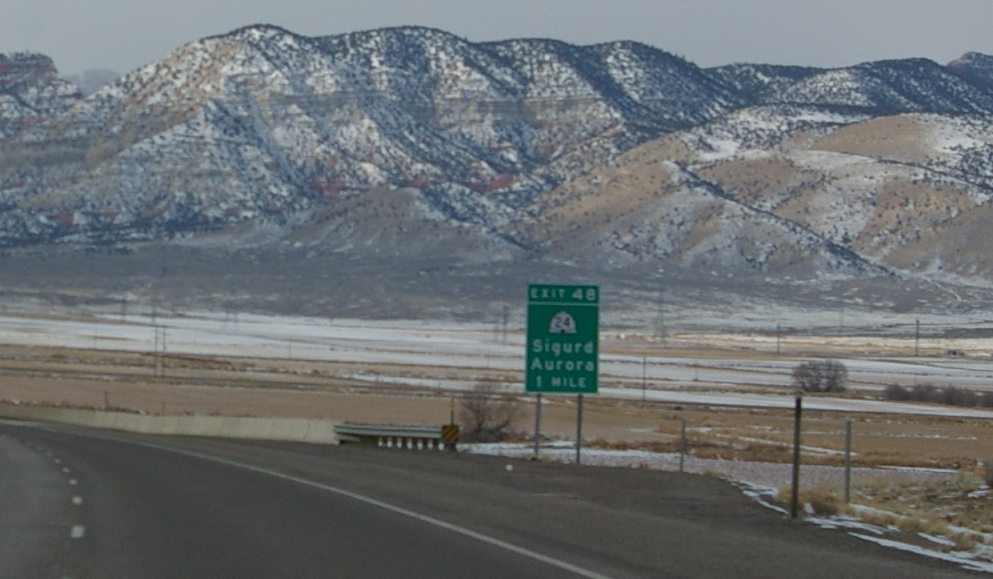
Road sign along Interstate 70 in Utah signaling traffic destined for the towns of Sigurd and Aurora to exit the freeway. The road at this exit is officially designated SR 259, a short connector; however, the sign instead shows SR 24, the highway at the other end of the connector.

=== Highway maintenance agencies with multiple numbering systems ===
- The C, D, and U road systems in the Great Britain road numbering scheme are systems of routes considered less important than B roads and typically left unsigned
- Delaware, New York, and Pennsylvania, among other jurisdictions, sign virtually all state maintained transportation features with small inventory markers, called maintenance road numbers (reference numbers), reference routes, and Quadrant Routes respectively.
- Secondary highways in states such as Montana are often unsigned (or minimally signed) when they pass through city or urban limits.

=== Signed with a name and not a number ===
- Queen Elizabeth Way (Highway 451) in Ontario
- Skyline Drive and Blue Ridge Parkway (State Route 48) in Virginia
- Florida's Turnpike (State Road 91) in Florida
- Canal Parkway (State Route 61) in Maryland
- Several parkways and toll roads in New Jersey, including: Garden State Parkway (Route 444), southern portion of the New Jersey Turnpike (Route 700), the Palisades Interstate Parkway (Route 445 in New Jersey) and the Atlantic City Expressway (Route 446).
- The Kentucky parkway system of former toll roads were initially signed exclusively with their names, although all carry an unsigned designation over 9000.

=== Concurrencies ===
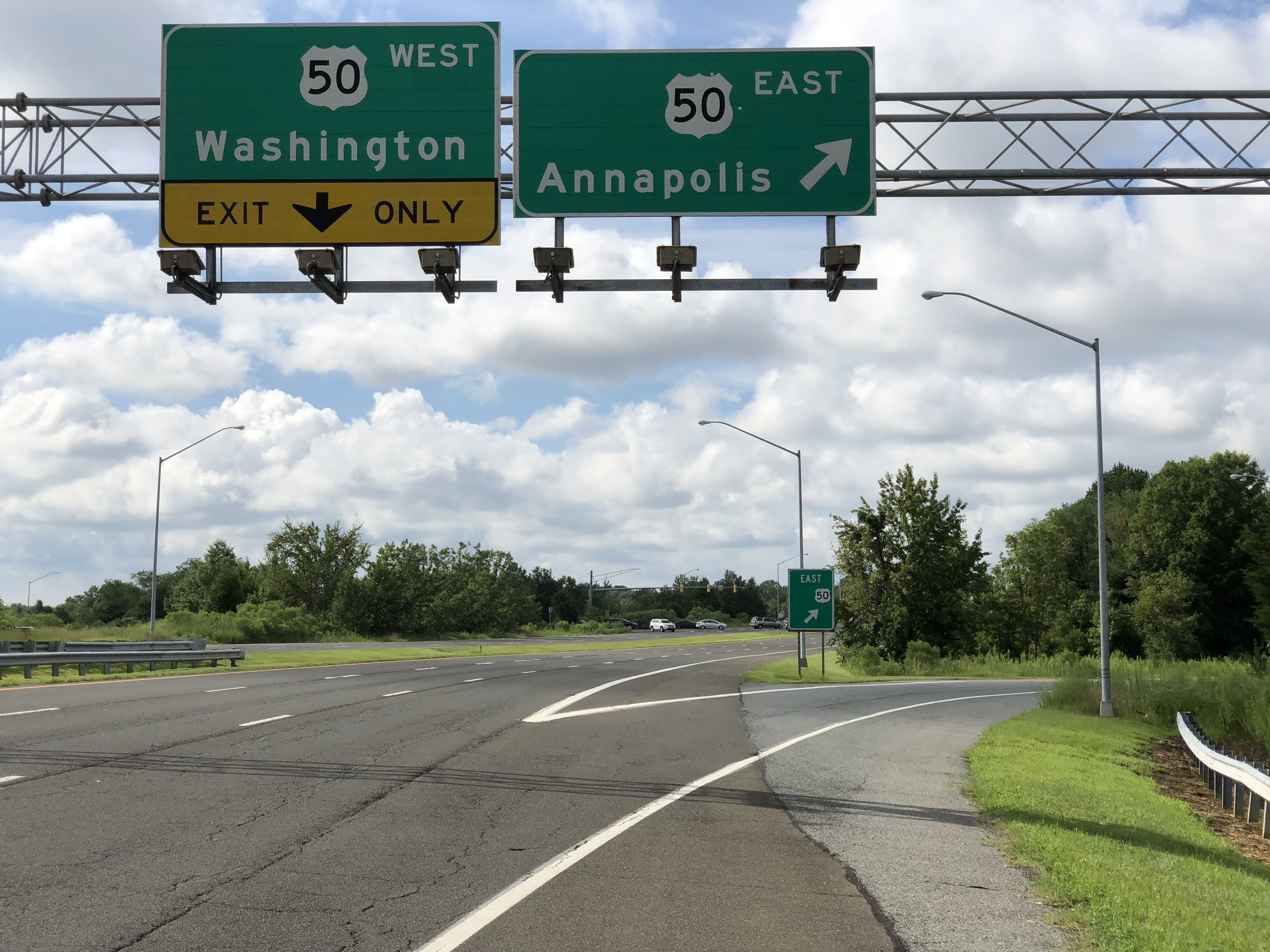
Road signs for U.S. Route 50 in Bowie, Maryland. The empty spaces next to the US 50 shields were reserved for Interstate 595 shields, which US 50 is concurrent with. However, the shields were never added, and I-595 remains unsigned.

There are numerous cases in the United States where the same physical roadbed has designations in the Interstate Highway System, U.S. Highway system and the state route system. In many cases one or more of the official designations is omitted.

- Many examples exist in the western United States where an Interstate highway runs concurrent with a U.S. or state highway, but only the Interstate designation is signed, though any route that becomes unsigned in these situations will still be signed on many road maps and atlases. Examples include U.S. Route 6 which is unsigned while concurrent with Interstate 70 throughout Colorado and U.S. Route 77 with Interstate 35E through the Dallas metropolitan area.
- Conversely, there are several urban freeways in the U.S. that have an unsigned Interstate Highway designation. Examples include: Interstate 444 in Tulsa, Oklahoma, Interstate 345 in Dallas, Texas, Interstate 305 in Sacramento, California, and Interstate 595 in Maryland.
- The Interstate Highway System includes highways outside the contiguous United States. While the ones in Hawaii are signed similarly to those in the contiguous United States, those in Alaska and Puerto Rico are signed with their state/territory route designation, not Interstate Highway shields.
- In the states of Alabama, Florida, and Tennessee, every US Highway is concurrent with an unsigned state highway for its entire length. Similarly, in the states of Florida and Georgia, every Interstate Highway is concurrent with an unsigned state highway for its entire length. In Tennessee, the state highway route number is signed along the green mile marker signs that display mileage within each county.

=== Other situations ===
- There are a small number of cases where a highway briefly crosses a political boundary, but is only signed with its designation on one side of that political boundary. Examples include the Alaska Highway, which crosses the boundary of the Canadian provinces of British Columbia and Yukon Territory several times. Although the highway has different numbered designations on each side of the border, the signs along it change designation at only one point. Another example is Washington State Route 41, the unsigned designation for a brief portion of the highway signed Idaho State Highway 41 that crosses the state line.
- The East Los Angeles Interchange is a case where a highway is unsigned with a conflict between the state and federal definition of a highway. The state definition of Interstate 10 has a discontinuity with a stub freeway proceeding west from the northern part of this interchange towards U.S. Route 101, while the federal definition of I-10 is contiguous. The discrepancy is resolved by having westbound signage at the interchange follow the federal definition. When driving west, I-10 is signed proceeding towards the main portion of the interchange concurrent with I-5, while the I-10 stub is signed instead as US 101.
