= Utah State Route 259 =

State highway in Utah, United States

State Route 259
- SR-259 highlighted in red

Route information
- Maintained by UDOT
- Length: 0.345 mi (555 m)
- Existed: 1992–present

Major junctions
- South end: SR-24 in Sigurd
- I-70 / US 89 in Sigurd
- North end: Sign indicating start of Federal Route 2570 in Sigurd

Location
- Country: United States
- State: Utah

Highway system
- Utah State Highway System; Interstate; US; State; Minor; Scenic
← SR-258	→ SR-260

State Route 259 (SH-259) is a short state highway within Sigurd in Sevier County, Utah connecting Interstate 70 (I-70)/U.S. Route 89 (US-89) to SR-24.

== Route description ==
From its southern terminus with SR-24, the highway heads northwest and veers more toward the north before meeting Interstate 70/US-89. Two-hundredths of a mile later, the route terminates at a sign indicating the beginning of Federal Route 2570. (Although the entire route is located within the city limits of the Town of Sigurd, the community located in the northern portion of the town was formerly known as Vermillion.)

== History ==
SR-259 was added to the state highway system in 1992 as a connection from the new I-70 to SR-24 (signed as US-89 until 1992). Although the road that continues north from I-70 is the former US-89, SR-259 is not; the original alignment is North State Street, crossing the ca. 1950 bypass (now SR-118) into SR-24.

== Major intersections ==
The entire route is in Sigurd, Sevier County.

mi	km	Destinations	Notes
0.000	0.000	SR-24 – Aurora, Salina, Loa	Southern terminus
0.269– 0.287	0.433– 0.462	I-70 / US 89 – Richfield, Salina	Exit 48 (I-70/US-89)
0.345	0.555	Beginning of Federal Route 2570 sign	Northern terminus
1.000 mi = 1.609 km; 1.000 km = 0.621 mi

== See also ==
- Interstate 70 in Utah
- Sigurd, Utah
- U.S. Route 89 in Utah
- Utah State Route 24
- Utah State Route 259 (1957-1977)
