= Utah State Route 258 =

State highway in Utah, United States

State Route 258
- Main Street

Route information
- Maintained by UDOT
- Length: 2.022 mi (3.254 km)
- Existed: 1969–present

Major junctions
- West end: Cattle guard in Elsinore
- I-70 / US 89 in Elsinore
- East end: SR-118 in Elsinore

Location
- Country: United States
- State: Utah

Highway system
- Utah State Highway System; Interstate; US; State; Minor; Scenic
| ← SR-257 | → SR-259 |

State Route 258 is a highway within Sevier County in central Utah connecting Interstate 70 to SR-118 and serving as the community of Elsinore's Main Street. It is two miles (3 km) long.

== Route description ==
From its western terminus at a cattle guard just west of the junction with Interstate 70, the highway maintains the same easterly direction through Elsinore. It then veers to the northeast before terminating at SR-118.

== History ==
The state legislature created State Route 258 in 1957, forming a loop east of SR-11 (US-89, now SR-118 and SR-258), along its former alignment through Central (between Elsinore and Richfield). When SR-11 was truncated to SR-4 (future I-70) at Sevier Junction in 1969, former SR-258 was removed from the state highway system, but the number was reused in the same area for what was SR-11 until 1969. At the time, its termini were proposed SR-4 in Elsinore and SR-120 near 600 South in Richfield; the north end was truncated slightly in 1987, when SR-120 was built along 1200 South, and further in 1992, when the majority became an extension of SR-118. However, none of these changes affected signage, as US-89 remained on the old road through Elsinore and Richfield until 1992, after I-70 was finally completed in the area.

== Major intersections ==
The entire route is in Elsinore, Sevier County.

| mi | km | Destinations | Notes |
|---|---|---|---|
| 0.000 | 0.000 | Cattle guard | Western terminus |
| 0.039– 0.061 | 0.063– 0.098 | I-70 / US 89 – Richfield, Las Vegas | |
| 2.022 | 3.254 | SR-118 – Richfield | Eastern terminus |
1.000 mi = 1.609 km; 1.000 km = 0.621 mi
