= Utah State Route 260 =

Highway in Utah

State Route 260

Route information
- Maintained by UDOT
- Length: 4.179 mi (6.725 km)
- Existed: 1992 as SR-170; renumbered 1993–present

Major junctions
- South end: SR-24 south of Aurora
- North end: US 50 north of Aurora

Location
- Country: United States
- State: Utah

Highway system
- Utah State Highway System; Interstate; US; State; Minor; Scenic
← SR-259	→ SR-261

State Route 260 is a highway within Sevier County in central Utah that connects SR-24 to US-50 while passing through the town of Aurora in a span of four miles (6 km).

== Route description ==
From its southern terminus at SR-24, the route goes northeast until entering Aurora, where it turns north. It continues this general direction until reaching the northern terminus of US-50.

== History ==
The state legislature designated State Route 256 in 1955, running south from SR-63 (now US-50) west of Salina through Aurora to SR-11 (US-89, now SR-24). The route was removed from the state highway system in 1969, but the Utah Transportation Commission restored it in 1992, soon after I-70 was completed in the area. At one of the meetings relating to disposition of the former alignment of US-89, Sevier County proposed that the state take over the road, used locally as a shortcut to reach I-15 via US-50. Early plans had it becoming part of SR-24, with the present SR-24 to Salina (old US-89) being given to the county, but this did not happen, and a new designation - State Route 170 - was used for the connection. About 1.5 years later, in October 1993, the commission realized that placing SR-170 and I-70 in close proximity might cause confusion, and changed the number to SR-260.

== Major intersections ==
The entire route is in Sevier County.

Location	mi	km	Destinations	Notes
	0.000	0.000	SR-24 – Sigurd, Salina, Loa	Southern terminus
	4.179	6.725	US 50 – Salina, Scipio	Northern terminus
1.000 mi = 1.609 km; 1.000 km = 0.621 mi
