= Utah State Route 118 =

State highway in Sevier County, Utah, United States

State Route 118

Route information
- Maintained by UDOT
- Length: 24.137 mi (38.845 km)
- Existed: 1931–present

Major junctions
- South end: I-70 / US 89 in Joseph
- SR-258 near Elsinore; SR-120 / I-70 BL in Richfield; SR-119 near Richfield
- North end: SR-24 in Sigurd

Location
- Country: United States
- State: Utah
- Counties: Sevier

Highway system
- Utah State Highway System; Interstate; US; State; Minor; Scenic
← SR-117	→ SR-119

State Route 118 (SR-118) is a state highway in the US state of Utah linking I-70/US-89 and Joseph to Richfield. The route is the main street for Joseph, Monroe and Richfield and spans 24.14 miles (38.85 km). The highway was established 1931, initially connecting Joseph to Monroe and Central Valley. Eventually, maintenance of the road was extended north to near Salina.

== Route description ==
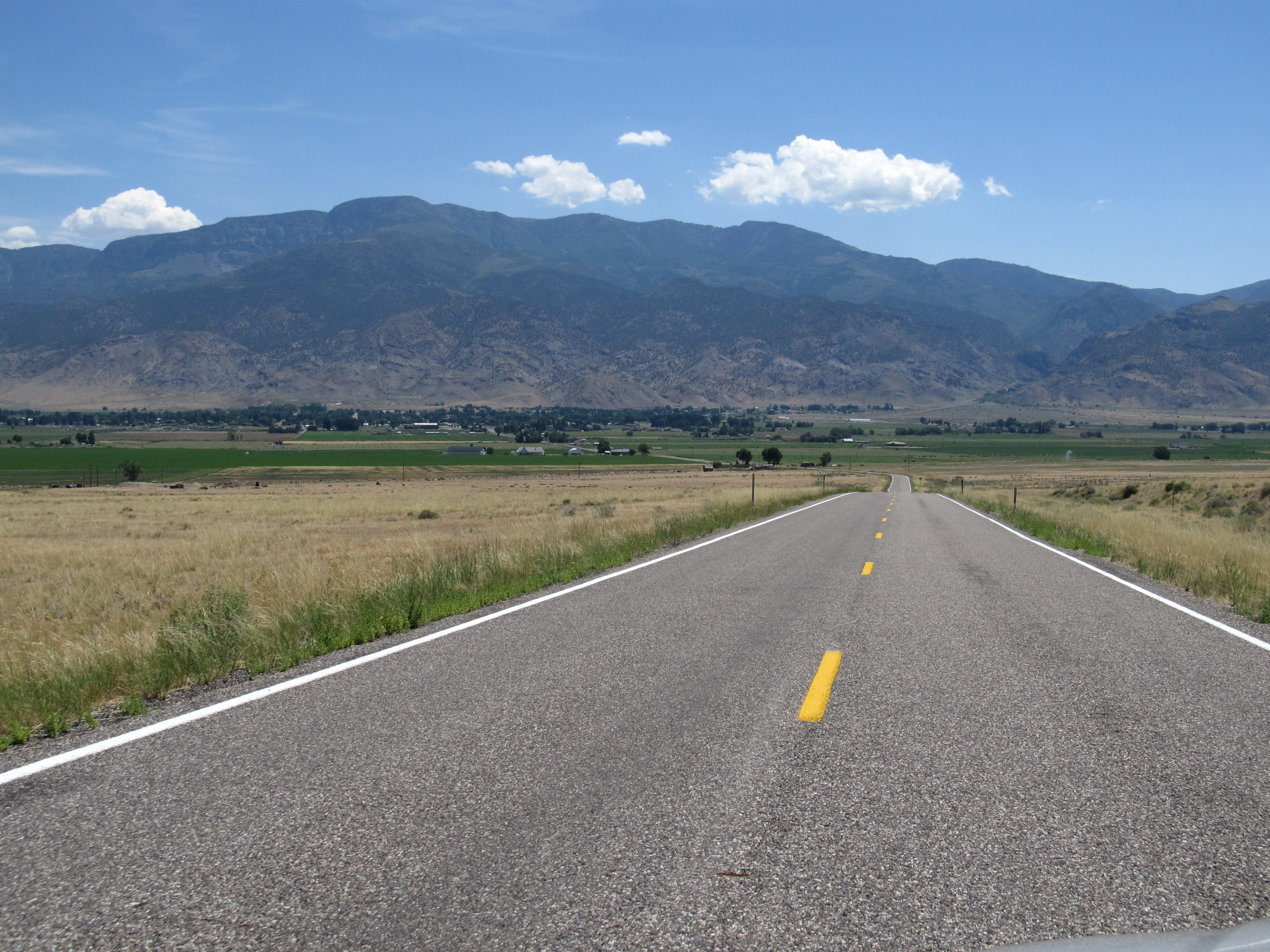
SR-118 between Joseph and Monroe

The highway begins at a diamond interchange on I-70/US-89 at exit 25 on the west side of Joseph and heads east as a two-lane undivided highway. The road enters Joseph as Main Street and turns northeast after exiting the town. The route intersects a few local roads before briefly curving southeast. The road now heads east-northeast before turning southeast and eventually east as the highway traverses the hills that separate Joseph and Monroe. More streets intersect the route before it enters Monroe as 100 South. In central Monroe, the highway turns north onto Main Street. Exiting Monroe and entering rural surroundings, it veers slightly eastward, passing through the community of Austin. East of Elsinore, the route meets SR-258 and turns northeast along the former routing of US 89.

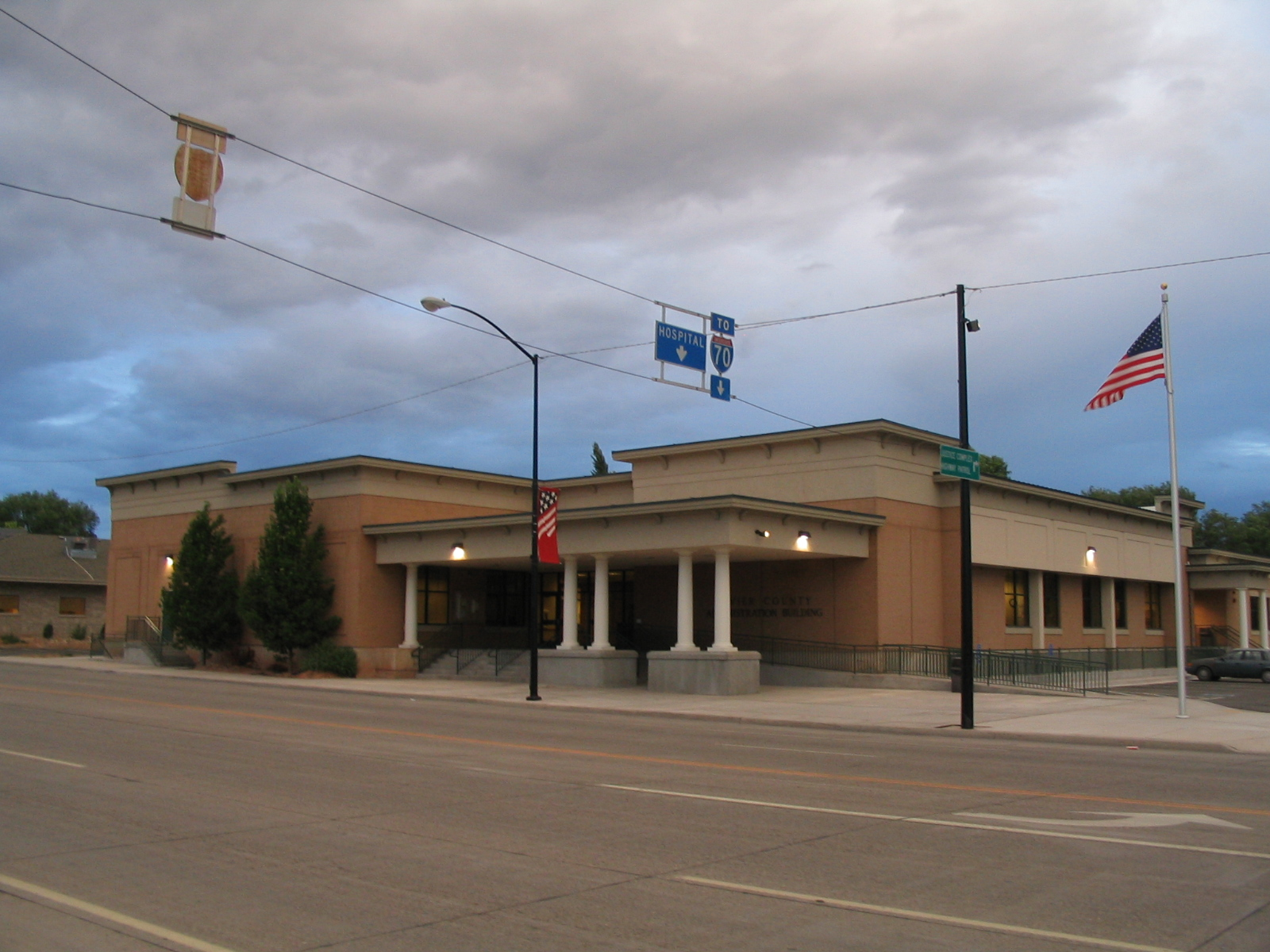
Sevier County Courthouse along SR-118/SR-120/I-70 BL in Richfield

North of Central Valley, the route passes Richfield Municipal Airport. North of the airport, the road enters Richfield as Main Street, widens to four lanes, and straightens to the north before a short overlap with SR-120 commences. As the concurrency ends, SR-120 continues north on Main Street while SR-118 turns east onto 300 North, a two-lane highway. The highway exits Richfield while SR-119 splits off toward Glenwood and SR-118 turns northeast. The route continues in this direction in a rural environment before terminating at SR-24 north of Sigurd and southwest of Salina.

== History ==
State Route 118 was formed in 1931 as a connector between Joseph and SR-11 to Central via Monroe. In 1957, the northern terminus was set to SR-258. In 1969, a proposed connection between Joseph and unfinished–I-70 was added to the system.

Also in 1969, SR-135 was designated as the road from SR-119 near Richfield northeast to SR-24 near Sigurd – a length of about 8.68 miles (13.97 km).

In 1992, US-89 in the area was realigned to coincide with I-70 with the old alignment of US-89 from Elsinore to Sigurd transferred to SR-118. This included most of SR-258, all of SR-135, and a small part of SR-119. As a result of this transfer, SR-135 was deleted from the state highway system. A new SR-135 was designated in 2016.

== Major intersections ==
The entire route is in Sevier County.

Location	mi	km	Destinations	Notes
Joseph	0.000– 0.105	0.000– 0.169	I-70 / US 89 to I-15 – Richfield, Las Vegas	Southern terminus; diamond interchange; I-70 exit 25
	10.042	16.161	SR-258 west – Elsinore	Eastern terminus of SR-258; former US-89
Richfield	14.679	23.624	SR-120 south (1300 South) / I-70 BL	South end of SR-120 overlap
Richfield	14.680	23.625	SR-120 north (Main Street) / I-70 BL	North end of SR-120 overlap
Richfield	15.544	25.016	SR-119 east (Glenwood Road) – Glenwood	Western terminus of SR-119
	24.137	38.845	SR-24 – Loa, Salina	Northern terminus
1.000 mi = 1.609 km; 1.000 km = 0.621 mi: Concurrency terminus
