= Utah State Route 24 =

State highway in Sevier, Piute, Wayne, and Emery counties in Utah, United States

State Route 24
- Capitol Reef Scenic Byway
- Map of State Route 24

Route information
- Maintained by UDOT
- Length: 160.294 mi (257.968 km)
- Existed: 1910 as a state highway; 1927 as SR-24–present

Major junctions
- West end: US 50 in Salina
- SR-118 in Sigurd; SR-62 at Plateau Junction; SR-25 near Fish Lake; SR-72 near Loa; SR-12 in Torrey; SR-95 in Hanksville
- East end: I-70 / US 50 near Green River

Location
- Country: United States
- State: Utah
- Counties: Sevier, Piute, Wayne, Emery

Highway system
- Utah State Highway System; Interstate; US; State; Minor; Scenic
← SR-23	→ SR-25

State Route 24 (SR-24) is a state highway in south central Utah which runs south from Salina through Sevier County then east through Wayne County and north east through Emery County. At a total of 163.294 miles (262.796 km), it is the longest contiguous state route in Utah. A portion of the highway has been designated the Capitol Reef Scenic Byway as part of the Utah Scenic Byways program.

== Route description ==
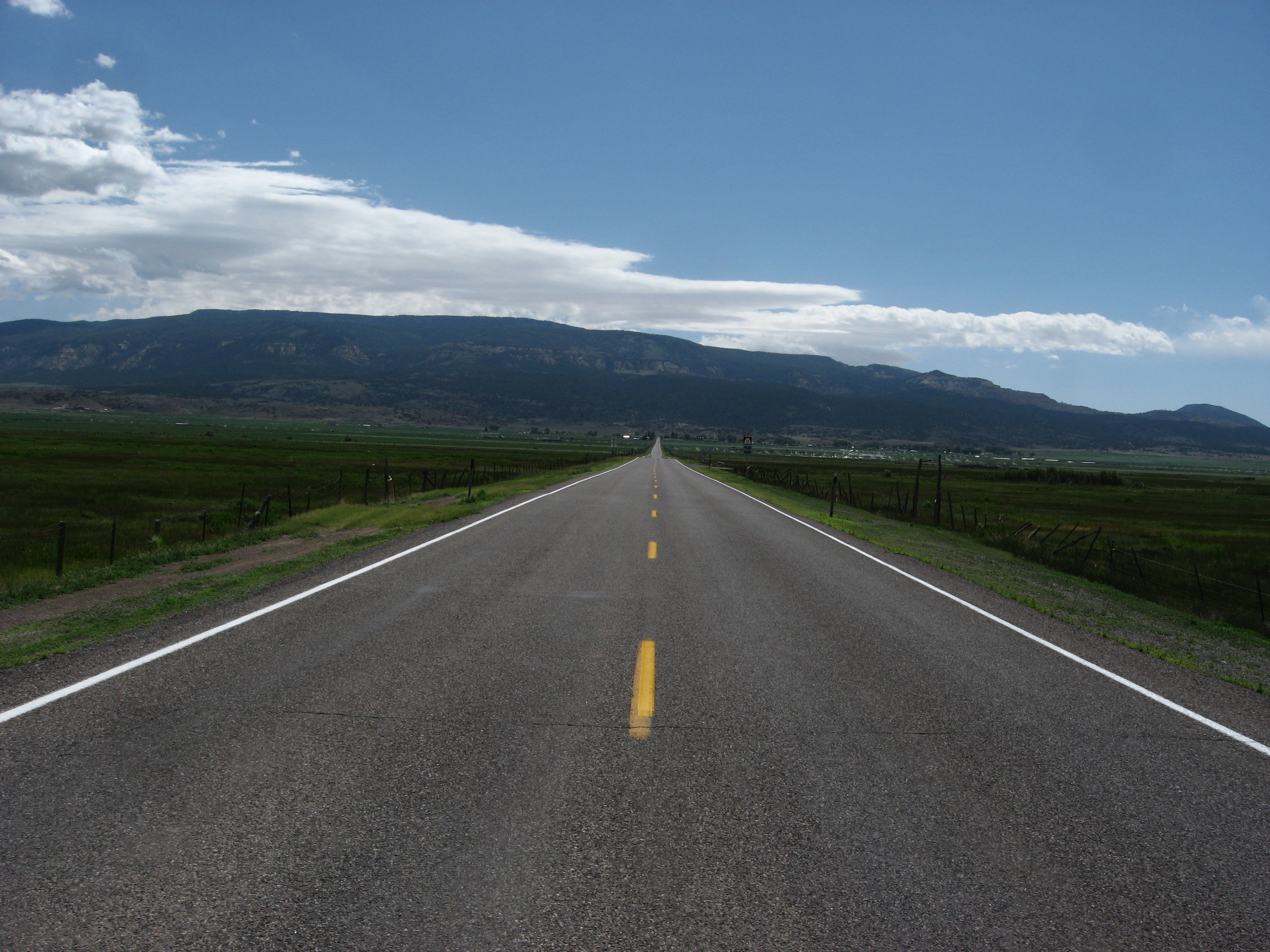
SR-24 between Loa and Lyman

The highway starts at US-50 near Salina and ends at I-70 near Green River, taking a 163-mile (262 km) scenic route between the Fishlake and Dixie National Forests then through Capitol Reef National Park, along the eastern side of the San Rafael Reef passing Goblin Valley State Park and meeting I-70 again near Green River. Along the way, it passes through the towns of Sigurd, Loa, Lyman, Bicknell, Torrey and Hanksville.

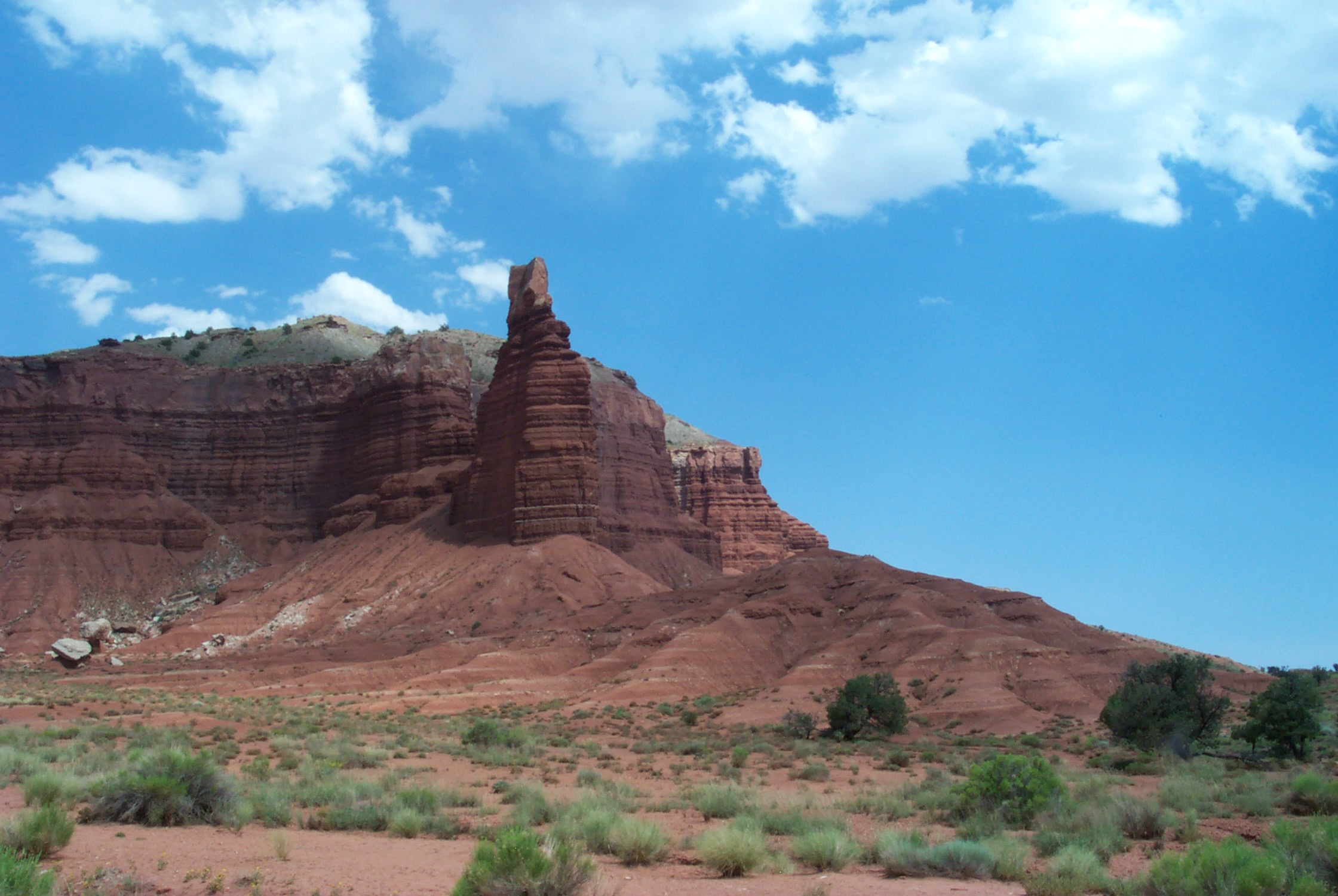
Portion of Capitol Reef along SR-24

The Mars Society established the Mars Desert Research Station just outside Hanksville, due to its Mars-like terrain .

The north easterly section past the San Rafael Reef is open desert with distant views of the Henry and La Sal Mountains.

=== Traffic volume ===
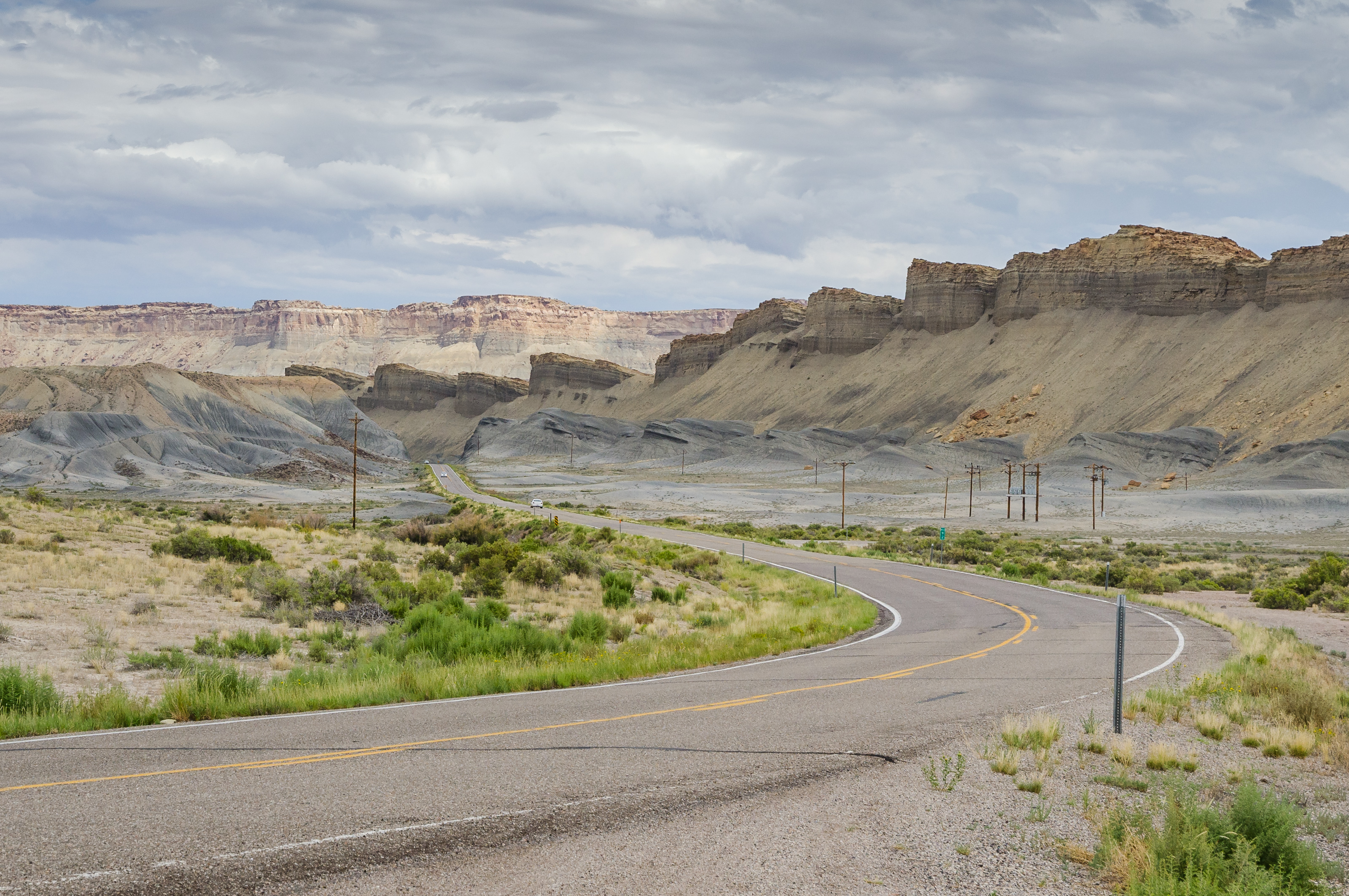
SR-24 between Torrey and Hanksville

The Average Daily Traffic (AADT) for SR-24 is at its greatest between Salina and Sigurd, where it varies between 3,085 down to 1,500 at the Junction with SR-118. Past that point, the volume of traffic varies greatly, reaching peaks where the highway coincides with the main streets in the several towns through which it passes. In Loa, the AADT reaches 2,080, in Torrey, it peaks at 1,230. Then the traffic dies down to 295 by the time SR-24 arrives back at I-70.

== History ==
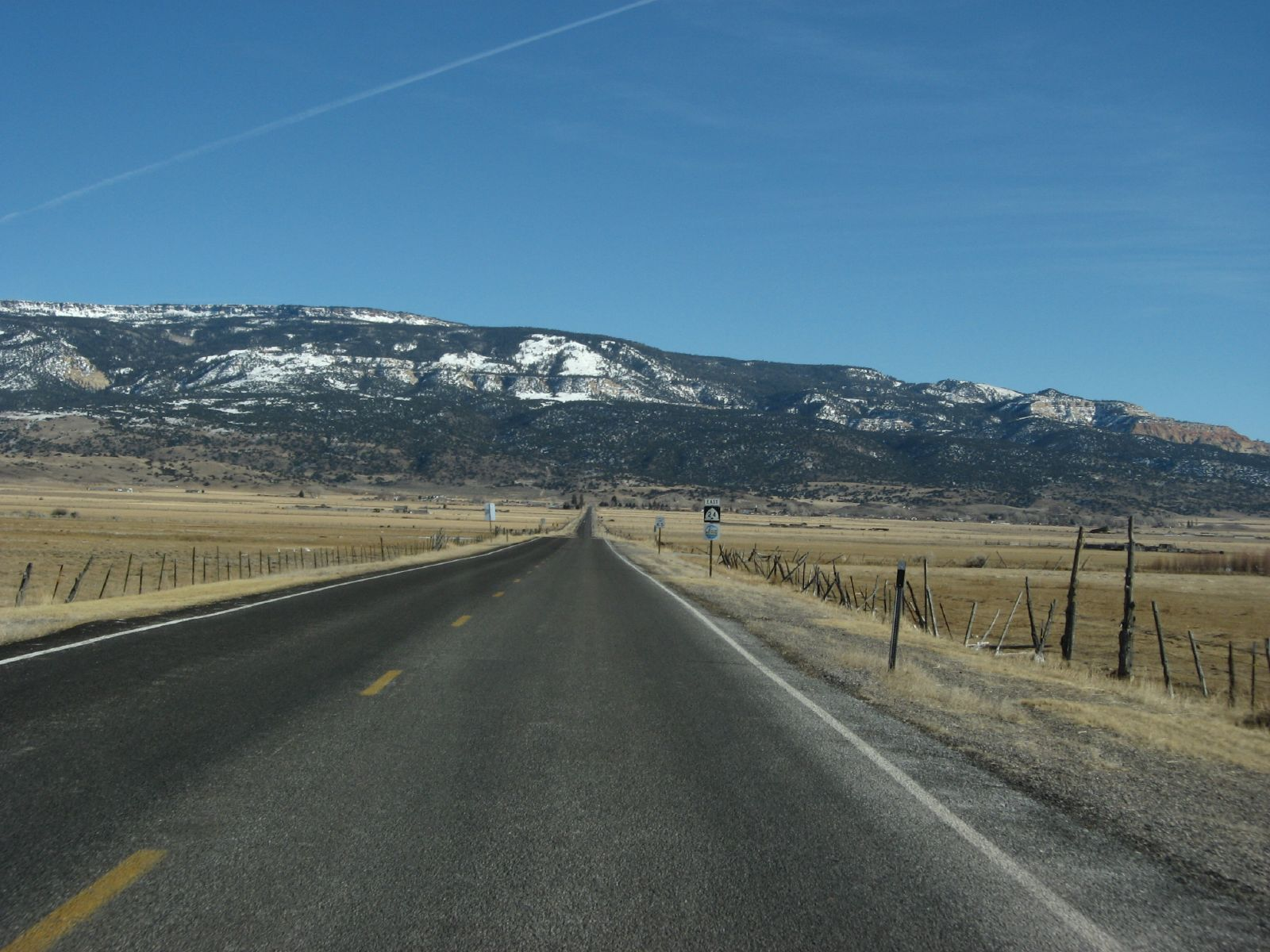
SR-24 sign between Loa and Lyman

The road from SR-11 (by 1926 US-89) at Sigurd southeast and east to Hanksville became a state highway in 1910 (Wayne County) and 1912 (Piute and Sevier Counties). The number was assigned in 1927 by the state legislature, and in 1935 it was extended northeast from Hanksville to US-6 near Green River.

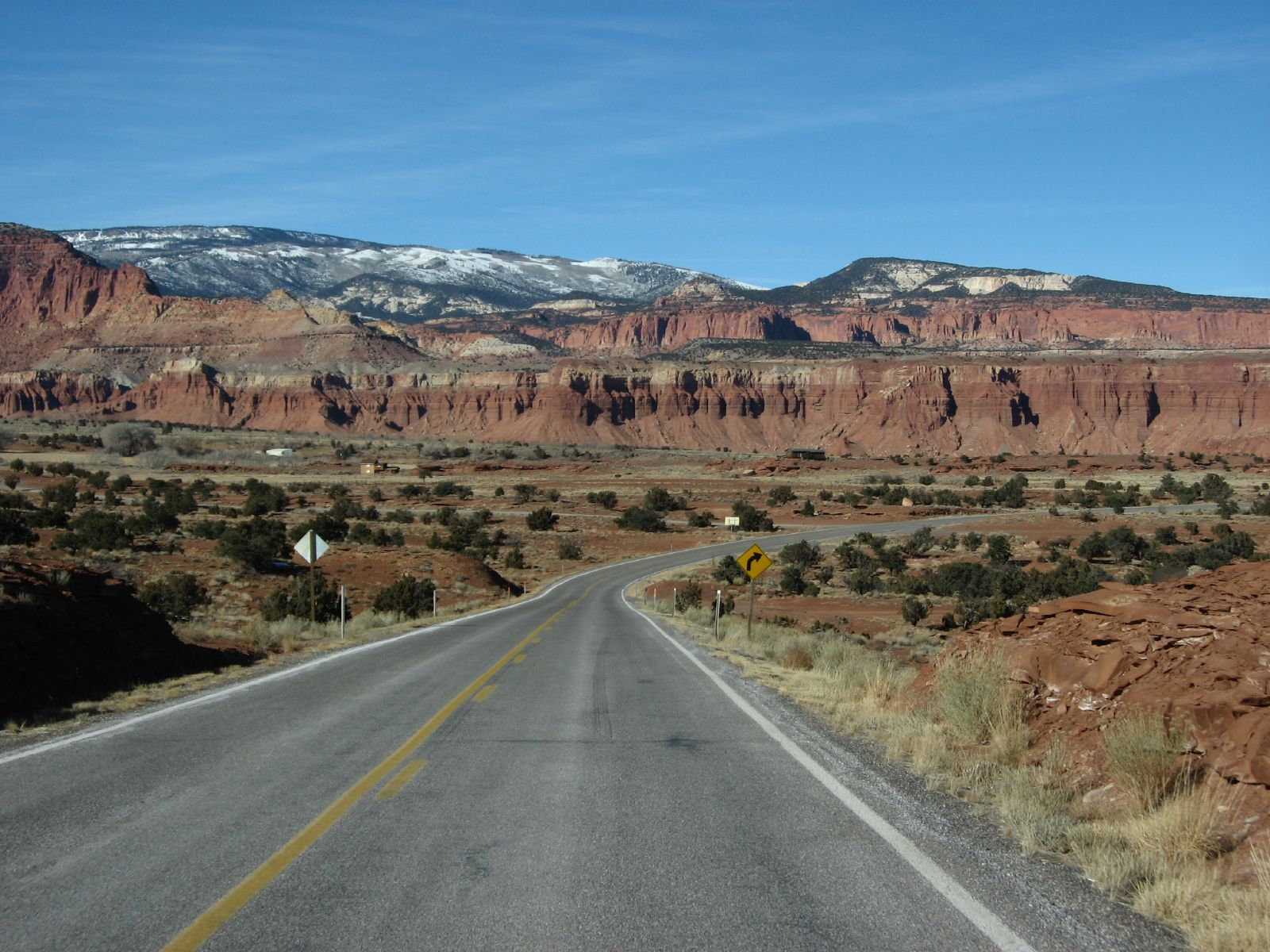
SR-24 between Capitol Reef National Park and Torrey

A realignment in 1961 bypassed Capitol Reef Road between Fruita and Caineville; as part of the construction of I-70, the east end was moved west to that highway's exit 149 in 1964. SR-24 was extended north from its west end over former US-89 to present-day US-89 in 1969, and cut back slightly to its current end at US-50 in the 1977 renumbering. (The 1969 extension was signed as part of US-89 until 1992, soon after I-70 was completed.)

For a time in the 1950s and 1960s, there was also a State Route 24A, which was a short spur of SR-24 from Sigurd southwest along Main Street to SR-11/US-89.

== Major intersections ==
County	Location	mi	km	Destinations	Notes
Sevier	Salina	0.000	0.000	US 50 (Main Street) – Scipio	Western terminus
Sevier	Aurora	5.301	8.531	SR-260 north	
Sevier	Sigurd	7.705	12.400	SR-259 north to I-70 / US 89	
Sevier	Sigurd	8.165	13.140	SR-118 south – Richfield	
Sevier	Glenwood	16.006	25.759	SR-119 west – Richfield	
Sevier	Plateau Junction	32.310	51.998	SR-62 south – Junction	
Piute	Fish Lake	39.094	62.916	SR-25 north	
Wayne	Loa	51.575	83.002	SR-72 north to I-70	
Wayne	Torrey	69.526	111.891	SR-12 south – Escalante	
Wayne	Hanksville	116.484	187.463	SR-95 south – Blanding	
Emery	Green River	159.811– 160.234	257.191– 257.872	I-70 / US 50 – Salina, Green River	I-70 exit 149.
Emery	Green River	160.294	257.968	Four Corners Mine Road	Eastern terminus
1.000 mi = 1.609 km; 1.000 km = 0.621 mi
