= Utah State Route 119 =

State highway in Sevier County, Utah, United States

State Route 119
- SR-119 highlighted in red

Route information
- Maintained by UDOT
- Length: 8.753 mi (14.087 km)
- Existed: 1931–present

Major junctions
- West end: SR-118 in Richfield
- East end: SR-24 near Glenwood

Location
- Country: United States
- State: Utah
- Counties: Sevier

Highway system
- Utah State Highway System; Interstate; US; State; Minor; Scenic
← SR-118	→ SR-120

State Route 119 (SR-119) is a 8.753-mile-long (14.087 km) state highway in the U.S. state of Utah, connecting SR-119 in Richfield to SR-24 near Glenwood.

== Route description ==
SR-119 begins on the eastern outskirts of Richfield at SR-118 (former US-89), which follows 300 North east from downtown Richfield and curves northeast towards Sigurd. The western half of SR-119 is a straight flat road through the Sevier Valley. After it reaches Main Street, which heads south into the town of Glenwood, the highway begins to curve and climb, crossing the Rainbow Hills before ending at SR-24 near the mouth of Kings Meadow Canyon.

== History ==
The state legislature created SR-119 in 1931, connecting SR-11 (US-89, now SR-118) in Richfield to SR-24 through Glenwood. The route was modified to bypass Glenwood in 1959, and a portion of the old route became State Route 263, which began at SR-119 and headed south on Main Street and east on Center Street to 200 East. SR-263 was removed from the state highway system in 1969, and simultaneously, as part of the truncation of SR-11 due to the proposed SR-4 (I-70), SR-119 was extended west over old SR-11 (still signed as US-89) to SR-120. This extension was undone in 1992, when US-89 was moved to follow I-70, and old US-89 through Richfield became SR-118 (also replacing SR-135 and most of SR-258).

== Major intersections ==
The entire route is in Sevier County.

Location	mi	km	Destinations	Notes
Richfield	0.000	0.000	SR-118	
	4.212	6.779	Main Street – Glenwood	Former SR-263
	8.753	14.087	SR-24	
1.000 mi = 1.609 km; 1.000 km = 0.621 mi
