= U.S. Route 50 in Utah =

Highway in Utah

U.S. Route 50
- US 50 highlighted in red

Route information
- Maintained by UDOT
- Length: 335.541 mi (540.001 km)
- Existed: 1926–present

Major junctions
- West end: US 6 / US 50 at the Nevada state line (east of Baker, NV)
- US 6 in Delta; I-15 in Holden; I-15 in Scipio; I-70 / US 89 in Salina; US 6 / US 191 near Green River; US 191 at Crescent Junction
- East end: I-70 / US 6 / US 50 at the Colorado state line (west of Fruita, CO)

Location
- Country: United States
- State: Utah
- Counties: Millard, Sevier, Emery, Grand

Highway system
- United States Numbered Highway System; List; Special; Divided; Utah State Highway System; Interstate; US; State; Minor; Scenic
← SR-48	→ SR-51

U.S. Route 50 (US-50) in Utah crosses the center of the state. The highway serves no major population centers in Utah, with the largest city along its path being Delta. Most of the route passes through desolate, remote areas. Through the eastern half of the state the route is concurrent with Interstate 70 (I-70). US-50 both enters and exits Utah concurrent with US-6, however the two routes are separate through the center of the state.

Three completely different routings of US-50 have existed between Green River and Ely, Nevada. The route between these cities has become progressively shorter as new roads have been paved through this largely uninhabited region of both states. The earlier routings were a result of a dispute between Utah and Nevada over which auto trails would be paved and converted to U.S. Highways.

== Route description ==
The highway enters Utah from Nevada in a desolate portion of the Great Basin Desert. Similar to many portions of the route in Nevada, there are multiple stretches without any motorist services. There are no services between the state line and the small farming village of Hinckley, just outside of Delta, a span of roadway that is about 100 miles (160 km). While passing through the Great Basin the highway crosses two mountain ranges, the Confusion Range via King's Canyon, and House Range via Skull Rock Pass, before arriving at the shore of Sevier Lake, an intermittent lake fed by snow melt from many mountain ranges in the eastern half of the Great Basin. The highway follows the north shore of Sevier Lake and the Sevier River towards Delta. Today much of the water in the Sevier river is diverted for agricultural use before reaching the lake, and rarely is significant water visible in the lake.

The scenery changes as US-50 approaches Delta, where U.S. Route 6 and 50 separate. As the road approaches Delta, a straight passage across desert becomes zigzags through farming areas. The highway continues to zigzag through farms until arriving at more mountainous terrain at Holden. At Holden, the highway merges with Interstate 15 to cross the Pavant Range via Scipio Summit. After passing the mountains, US-50 then separates from this freeway as again a two lane road passing through desolate territory towards Salina where the road joins with Interstate 70. The two highways run concurrent from this point east to Colorado. Yet again, there is a stretch of highway 110 miles (180 km) long without services from Salina to Green River.

While co-routed with I-70, US-50 crosses the Wasatch Plateau and passes through the San Rafael Swell. The construction of I-70 through the swell is noted as one of the engineering marvels of the Interstate Highway System. One specific feat, the excavation through a portion called Spotted Wolf Canyon, required excavating 3,500,000 cubic yards (2,700,000 m^{3}) of rock to have a bed for just 8 miles (13 km) of roadway. Construction workers noted that prior to the construction of the freeway a man could stand in this canyon and touch both sides of the canyon wall.

US-6 rejoins US-50 near Green River. The three routes run concurrent and follow the southern edge of the Book Cliffs to Grand Junction, Colorado. Once again, services are not present from Thompson Springs to Fruita, Colorado, a span of about 60 miles (97 km). This portion of US-50 is part of the Dinosaur Diamond Prehistoric Highway, a National Scenic Byway. The name of the byway comes from the large number of areas along the route with visible dinosaur remains. The entire route through the state, as well as the concurrencies with I-15 and I-70, is included in the National Highway System.

== Photos ==
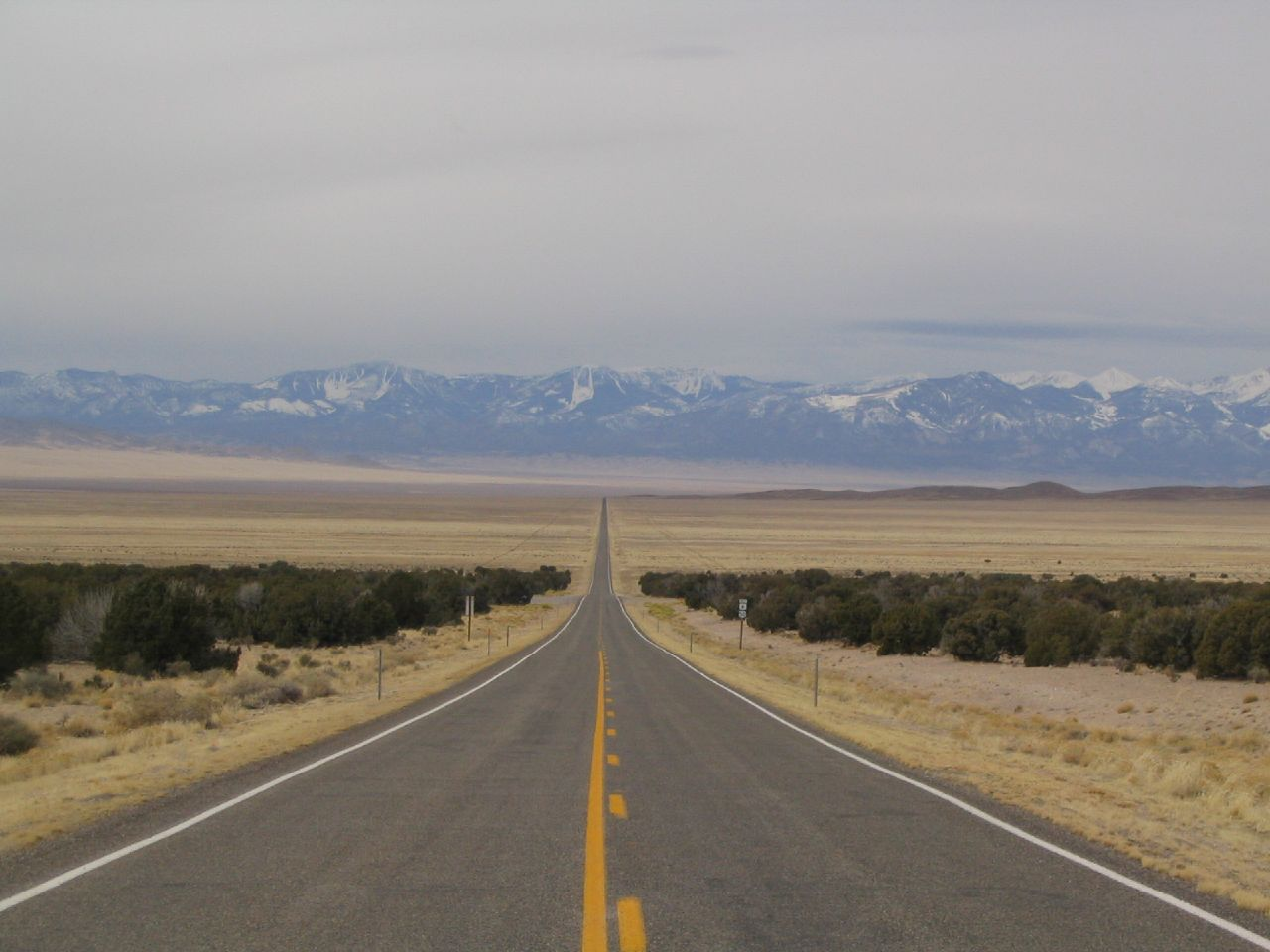
US-50 and US-6 between Nevada border and Delta

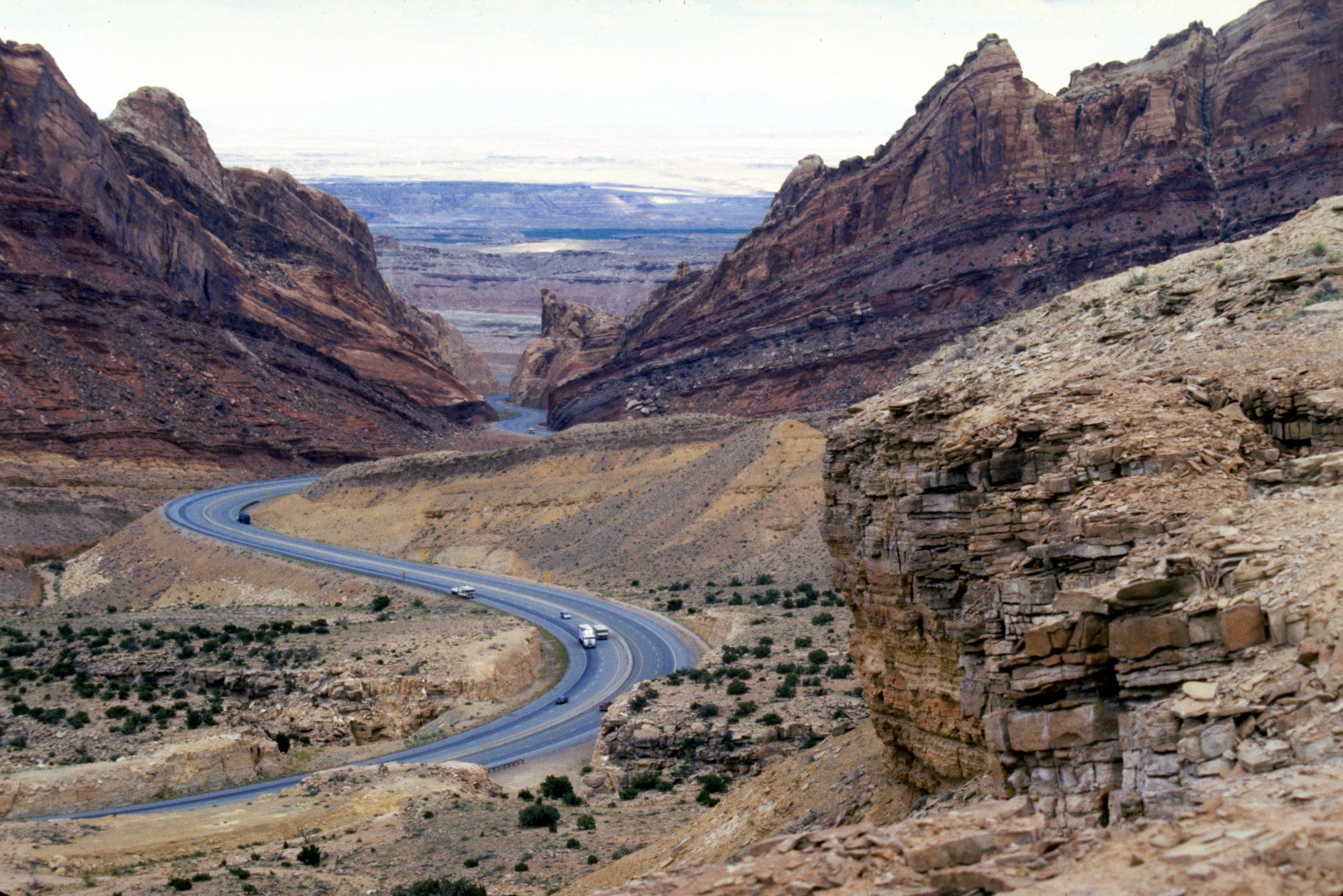
I-70 (and US-50) routed through Spotted Wolf Canyon

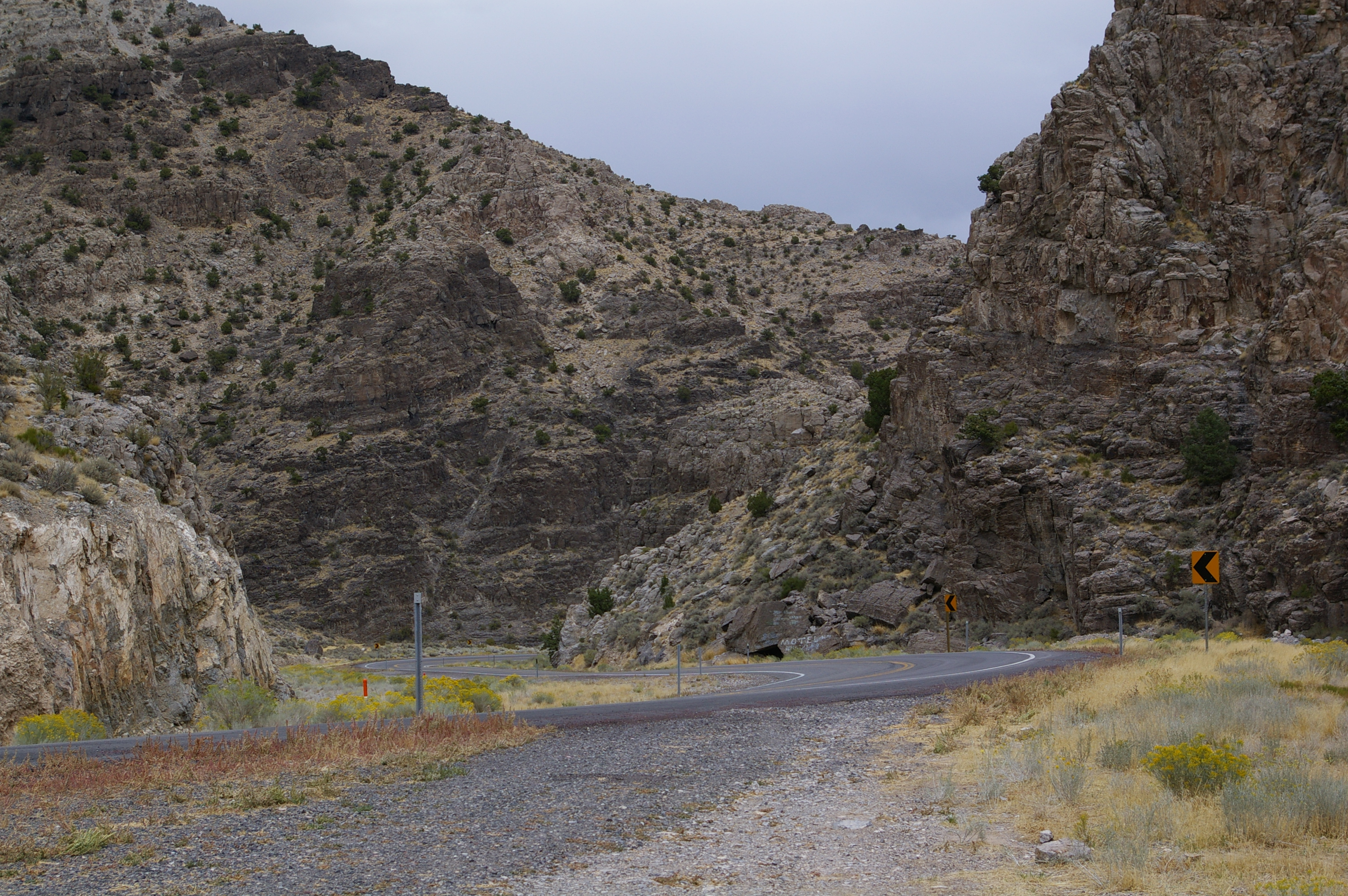
US-50 descending from Skull Rock Pass in western Utah

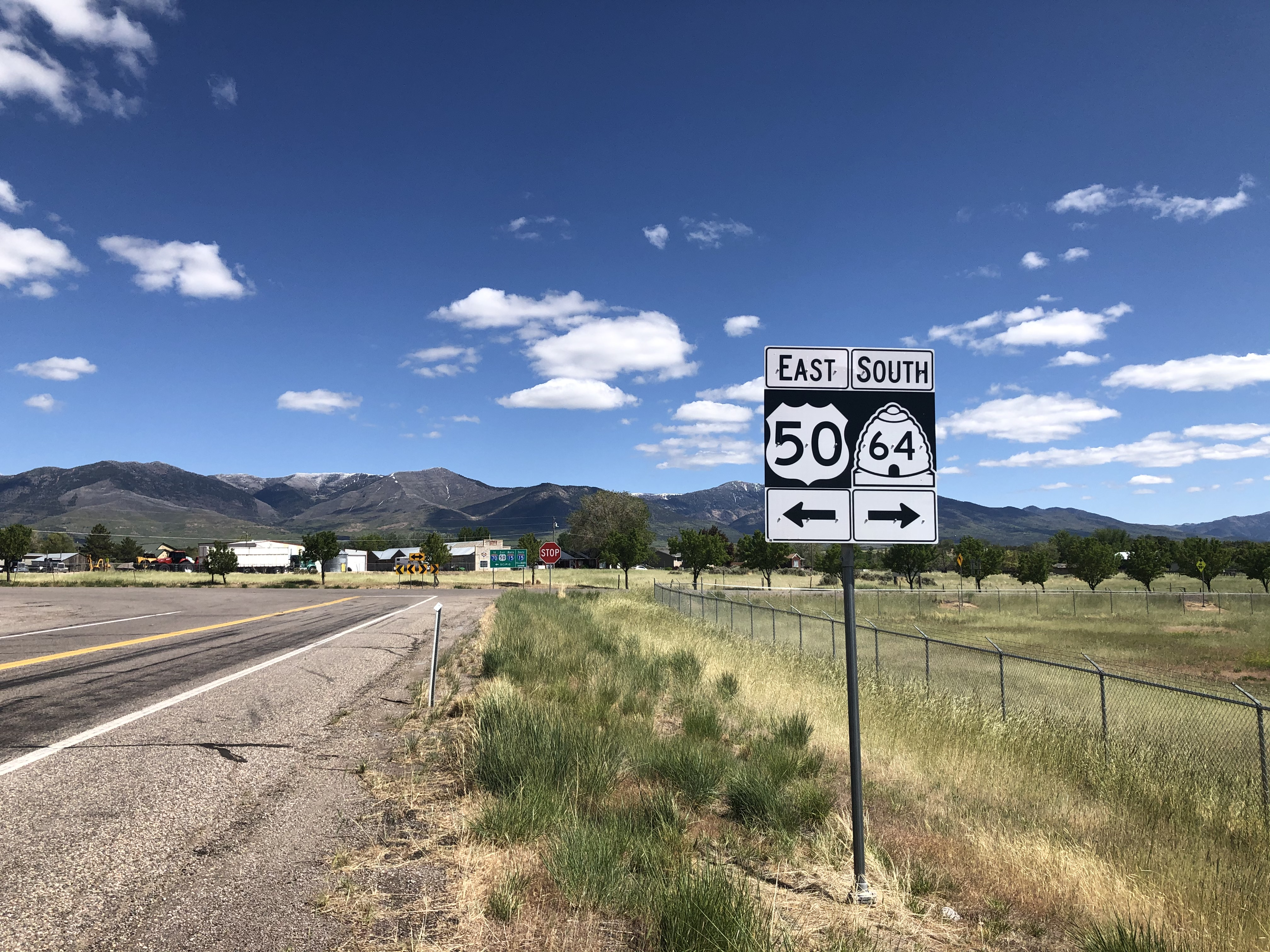
Eastbound US 50 arrives at a T-intersection at the edge of Holden and turns left, and the SR-64 is to the right (May 2020)

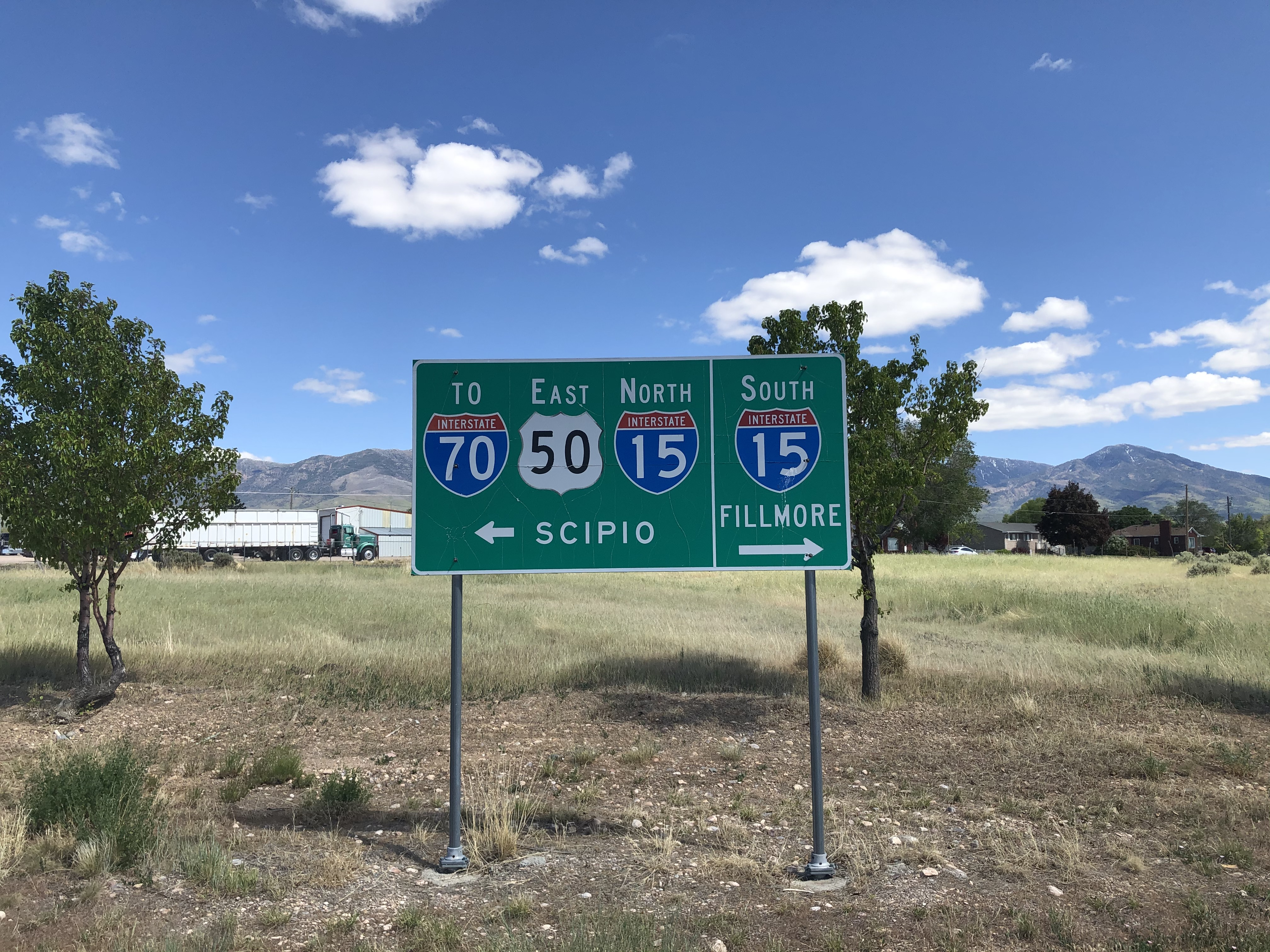
Signage at the T-intersection in Holden. To the right is SR-64, but the BGS simply points the way to Interstate 15 (May 2020)

== History ==
The modern route of U.S. Route 50 between Ely, Nevada and Green River, Utah is the third iteration.

=== First iteration ===
In 1926, when the U.S. Highway system was first announced, there was a gap in US-50 between Ely and Thistle. At the time the states of Utah and Nevada were feuding about which of the old auto trails would be paved and used for the new U.S. Highway System. Nevada favored the Lincoln Highway, which the modern US-50 closely follows in that state. Utah refused to consider the Lincoln Highway west of Salt Lake City. Officials perceived that route would carry all California bound traffic directly to Nevada while passing through very few communities in Utah. Utah instead favored the Victory Highway (modern Interstate 80 west of Salt Lake) and the Arrowhead Trail (modern Interstate 15). By favoring these routes Utah could force travelers destined for southern California to use a different route than those destined for northern California, with both of these traversing through more cities in Utah than the Lincoln Highway. The Arrowhead trail was especially beneficial to Utah as it passed through many communities in the state, but only Las Vegas in Nevada.

Utah prevailed and US-50 did not continue to follow the Lincoln Highway to Salt Lake City as Nevada had wanted. The first continuous route of US-50 across eastern Nevada and western Utah was an arch shaped route. US-50 proceeded north from Ely along what is now numbered U.S. Route 93 and Alternate US-93 where the highway would merge with the Victory Highway (U.S. Route 40 along the Wendover Cut-off, since replaced by I-80) to Salt Lake. From there the highway returned to Green River via what is now numbered State Route 201, U.S. Route 89 and U.S. Route 6.

=== Second iteration ===
The second iteration has its origins with the formation of US-6. In 1937, US-6 was extended west from its former terminus at Greeley, Colorado to Long Beach, California. In eastern Utah the route used the existing alignment of US-50. However, in western Utah the route used an unpaved road through Delta reconnecting with US-50 in Ely. In 1953, US-50 was approved to use this shorter alignment with the older US-50 alignment designated as U.S. Route 50 Alternate. Nevada first showed this alignment as paved and signed as US 50 in their 1954 map. With this change, US-6/50 ran concurrent from Ely to Grand Junction, Colorado.

The paved version did not exactly follow the unpaved roads. The dirt route passed through the numerous mountain ranges of the Great Basin using Marjum canyon and Marjum Pass to and through the Tule Valley. Once paved, the route was relocated to follow the north shore of Sevier Lake, which reduced the number of mountain ranges crossed. Although US-50 was moved to yet another alignment, this route remains US-6 today.

=== Third iteration ===
The modern route of US-50 was created in 1976. This iteration of US-50 has its origins in a dispute over the route of Interstate 70 in Utah. While I-70 was in the planning stage Colorado lobbied for an extension of the original proposal to run across Colorado and into Utah. Utah supported an extension using then US-6/50 to connect Denver, Colorado with Salt Lake City. However, federal planners did not see value in this route and instead supported a route that could be used to connect Denver with Los Angeles, California. I-70 was built using the federally selected route. In 1976, US-50 was changed again to a routing mostly concurrent with I-70. The portion of modern US-50 between Delta and Scipio had been previously numbered State Route 26, and the portion between Scipio and Salina had been numbered State Route 63, with the SR-63 portion being transferred to SR-26 in 1971.

East of Green River I-70 closely follows the original route of US-50, with some minor straightening by Crescent Junction, Cisco, and Westwater.

== Major intersections ==
County	Location	mi	km	Exit	Destinations	Notes
Millard		0.000	0.000		US 6 west / US 50 west – Ely	Continuation into Nevada
Millard		0.665	1.070		SR-159 south – Garrison, Milford	
Millard		83.897	135.019		SR-257 south – Deseret, Milford	
Millard	Delta	88.302	142.108		50 North / 500 West	Interchange; westbound exit and eastbound entrance
Millard	Delta	89.402	143.879		US 6 east – Salt Lake City	East end of overlap with US-6
Millard		92.976	149.630		SR-125 east / SR-136 north – Oak City, Lynndyl	
Millard		107.597	173.161		SR-100 south – Fillmore, Meadow	
Millard	Holden	116.497	187.484		SR-64 to I-15 south – Fillmore	Former US-91 south
Millard		119.723	192.675		I-15 south	West end of overlap with I-15; exit 178 on I-15
Millard		125.031	201.218	184	Tower Road	Exit number follows I-15; signed as "Ranch Exit" until 2015
Millard		129.816	208.919		I-15 north – Salt Lake City	East end of overlap with I-15; exit 188 on I-15
Sevier		154.805	249.134		SR-260 south to I-70 west – Aurora	
Sevier	Salina	157.803	253.959		SR-24 east – Aurora	
Sevier	Salina	158.633 227.689	255.295 366.430		I-70 BS begins / US 89 north (State Street north) – Gunnison, Salt Lake City	West end of overlap with I-70 Bus./US-89; Mileposts reflect distance along US-89
Sevier	Salina	225.956 56.979	363.641 91.699		I-70 BS ends / I-70 west / US 89 south – Richfield	East end of overlap with I-70 Bus./US-89; west end of overlap with I-70; Mileposts reflect distance along I-70
Sevier		63.193	101.699	63	Gooseberry Road	
Sevier		73.924	118.969	73	Salina Creek	Formerly signed as Ranch exit
Sevier		86.773	139.648	86	Ivie Creek rest area	Access via SR-76
Sevier		91.011	146.468	91	SR-10 north / SR-72 south – Price, Loa	
Emery		99.488	160.110	99	Millers Canyon	Formerly signed as Ranch exit
Emery		104.620	168.370	Salt Wash view area (westbound); Sand Beach view area (eastbound)		
Emery		108.011	173.827	108	Lone Tree	Formerly signed as Ranch exit
Emery		115.634	186.095	Devil's Canyon view area (eastbound)		
Emery		116.513	187.509	116	Moore	Eagle Canyon view area also signed westbound
Emery		122.566	197.251	Ghost Rocks view area		
Emery		131.507	211.640	131	Temple Mt. Road	Formerly signed as Ranch Exit
Emery		142.585	229.468	Spotted Wolf Canyon view area		
Emery		146.337	235.507	San Rafael Reef view area (westbound)		
Emery		149.198	240.111	149	SR-24 west – Hanksville	
Emery		157.924	254.154	157	US 6 west / US 191 north – Price, Salt Lake City	West end of US-6/191 overlap
Emery		160.403	258.144	160	I-70 BL / SR-19 east – Green River	I-70 Bus. not signed westbound
Grand		164.547	264.813	164	I-70 BL / SR-19 west – Green River	I-70 Bus. not signed eastbound
Grand		175.585	282.577	175	Floy	
Grand	Crescent Junction	182.153	293.147	182	US 191 south – Crescent Junction, Moab	East end of US-191 overlap; former US-160 east
Grand		187.413	301.612	187	Thompson Springs (SR-94)	
Grand		189.876	305.576	Rest area / Visitors Center (westbound)		
Grand		193.469	311.358	193	Yellowcat	
Grand		204.738	329.494	204	SR-128 south – Cisco	
Grand		214.367	344.990	214	Danish Flat	
Grand		221.885	357.089	221	Sulphur	
Grand		227.086	365.459	227	Westwater	
Grand		228.352	367.497	Harley Dome view area (westbound)		
Grand		231.673	372.842		I-70 east / US 6 east / US 50 east – Grand Junction, Denver	Continuation into Colorado
1.000 mi = 1.609 km; 1.000 km = 0.621 mi: Concurrency terminus; Incomplete access

U.S. Route 50
Previous state: Nevada	Utah	Next state: Colorado
