= Cornelius Salisbury =

American painter and educator

- Born: 1882; Richfield, Utah, U.S.
- Died: October 9, 1970 (aged 87–88); Salt Lake City, Utah, U.S.
- Education: University of Utah; Brigham Young University; Art Students League of New York; Pratt Institute
- Occupations: Painter, educator
- Spouse: Rosine Howard

Cornelius Salisbury (1882 - October 9, 1970) was an American painter and educator. His artwork, which depicts scenes from the Old West and Utahn landscapes, can be seen in many public schools in Utah and at the Springville Museum of Art.

== Life ==
Salisbury was born in 1882 in Richfield, Utah. He was educated at the University of Utah and Brigham Young University, and he was also trained at the Art Students League of New York and the Pratt Institute in New York City, the Broadmoor Art Academy in Colorado Springs, as well as at the Corcoran Museum of Art in Washington, D.C.

Salisbury worked as a public school teacher in Salt Lake City until 1943. He painted Utahn landscapes as well as figures from the Old West, including the houses of American pioneers on the frontier. According to Painters of Utah's Canyons and Deserts, "Many of his desert-country pictures are set in historical times while others are in contemporary settings." He was the president of Associated Utah Artists, and a member of the Utah Historical Society. Salisbury's artwork was acquired by the Springville Museum of Art as well as many public schools in Utah.

Salisbury was a member of the Church of Jesus Christ of Latter-day Saints. married Rosine Howard, also known as Rose Salisbury; she was also a painter. He died on October 9, 1970, in Salt Lake City, at age 87.
