= Utah State Route 120 =

State highway in Utah, United States

State Route 120
- I-70 Business Loop
- SR-120 highlighted in red

Route information
- Maintained by UDOT
- Length: 3.8745 mi (6.2354 km)
- Existed: 1969–present
- NHS: Entire route

Major junctions
- South end: I-70 / US 89 in Richfield
- SR-118 in Richfield
- North end: I-70 / US 89 in Richfield

Location
- Country: United States
- State: Utah
- Counties: Sevier

Highway system
- Interstate Highway System; Main; Auxiliary; Suffixed; Business; Future; Utah State Highway System; Interstate; US; State; Minor; Scenic
← SR-119	→ SR-121

State Route 120 (SR-120) is a state highway in the US state of Utah forming a business loop around I-70 serving the town of Richfield. The route forms the main street for Richfield and spans 3.89 miles (6.26 km). The highway was established 1969, coinciding with the construction of I-70 through Sevier County.

== Route description ==
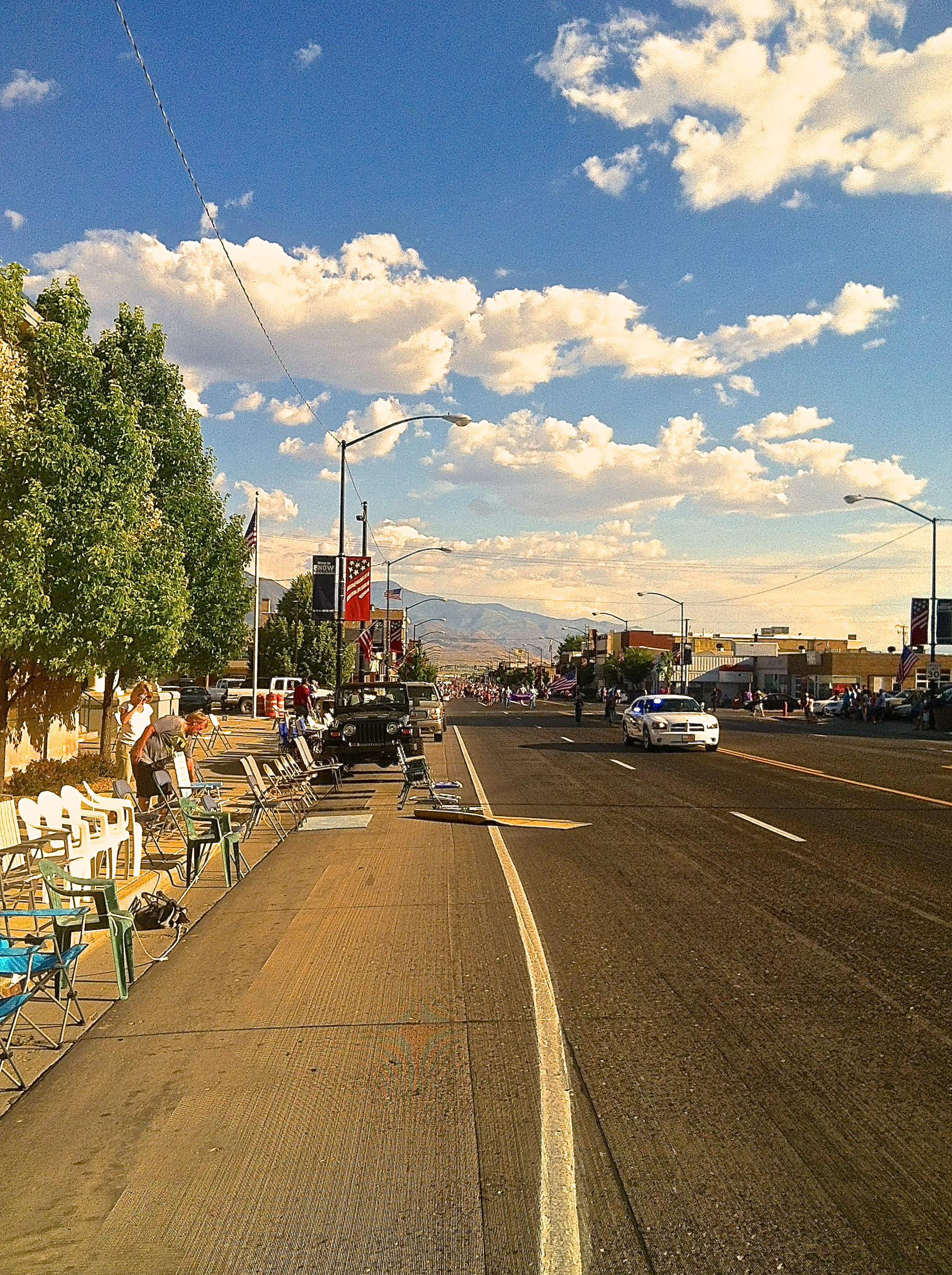
South along I-70 Bus. / SR-120 (North Main Street) in Richfield (with setup for the Independence Day [Fourth of July] parade), July 2012

The highway begins at a diamond interchange on I-70/US-89 at exit 37. From there, the route heads east on 1200 South, a four-lane undivided highway, in the southwestern portion of Richfield. The road continues east for ten blocks before turning northeast on Main Street, a four-lane road, and beginning an overlap with SR-118 (the former routing of US 89). Past 900 South, the road straightens out to the north and reaches central Richfield. At 300 North, SR-118 branches off to the east and SR-120 continues north on Main Street. The road passes a cemetery and a hospital before turning northeast. The route and Main Street terminate at another diamond interchange with I-70, this time at exit 40.

All of SR-120/I-70 Business is included in the National Highway System.

== History ==
State Route 120 was established in 1969 as a road looping around I-70 in Richfield. The route was initially composed of three portions: a proposed road from the under-construction interchange at I-70 in southeast Richfield to Main Street, the existent portion of Main Street (then a part of US 89) north to 300 North, and another proposed road connecting this point to the north Richfield interchange. The proposed roads were completed in 1990, with the overlapping portion of US 89 along Main Street rerouted onto I-70 in 1992. No realignments have affected the route since then.

== Major intersections ==
The entire route is in Richfield, Sevier County.

mi	km	Destinations	Notes
0.0000– 0.0778	0.0000– 0.1252	S Redhills Dr west – Elsinore	Road continues west (then promptly south) from western terminus
0.0000– 0.0778	0.0000– 0.1252	I-70 east / US 89 north – I-70 Bus. / SR-120 I-70 west / US 89 south – Salina; I-70 BL west end (W 1300 South)	Southern terminus; diamond interchange; I-70 / US 89 exit 37; western end of SR-120 concurrency
1.0078	1.6219	West 1300 South east SR-118 south (S Main Street) – Elsinore, Monroe	North end of southern segment of SR-118; SR-118 south is the former routing of US 89
2.5960	4.1779	SR-118 north (E 300 North) – Salina, Salt Lake City; West 300 South west	South end of northern segment of SR-118
3.7782– 3.8745	6.0804– 6.2354	I-70 east / US 89 north – Salina I-70 west / US 89 south – I-70 Bus. / SR-120, Las Vegas I-70 BL east end (N Main Street) / SR-120	Northern terminus; diamond interchange; I-70 / US 89 exit 37; eastern end of SR-120 concurrency
3.7782– 3.8745	6.0804– 6.2354	CR 1139 north	Continues north from eastern terminus
1.000 mi = 1.609 km; 1.000 km = 0.621 mi: Concurrency terminus

== See also ==
- List of state highways in Utah
- Business routes of Interstate 70
