= Sevier School District =

School district in Utah, United States

Address
- 180 East 600 North Richfield, Utah, 84701; United States

District information
- Type: Public
- Grades: PreK–12
- NCES District ID: 4900930

Students and staff
- Students: 4,684

Other information
- Website: www.seviersd.org

Sevier School District is a school district headquartered in Richfield, Utah.

It covers all of Sevier County.

== Services ==
In 1992 the Utah Schools for the Deaf and the Blind (USDB) began a partnership with the district in educating deaf students at Sevier schools.

== Schools ==
High schools

- Cedar Ridge High School
- North Sevier High School
- Richfield High School
- South Sevier High School
- Sevier CTE Center
  - It was created as a career development center for all of the high schools in the school district.

Middle schools

- North Sevier
- Red Hills
- South Sevier

Elementary schools

- Ashman
- Koosharem
- Monroe
- Pahvant
- Salina

Preschools

- Monroe
- Richfield
- Salina
