= Aurora, Utah =

City in Utah, United States

- City
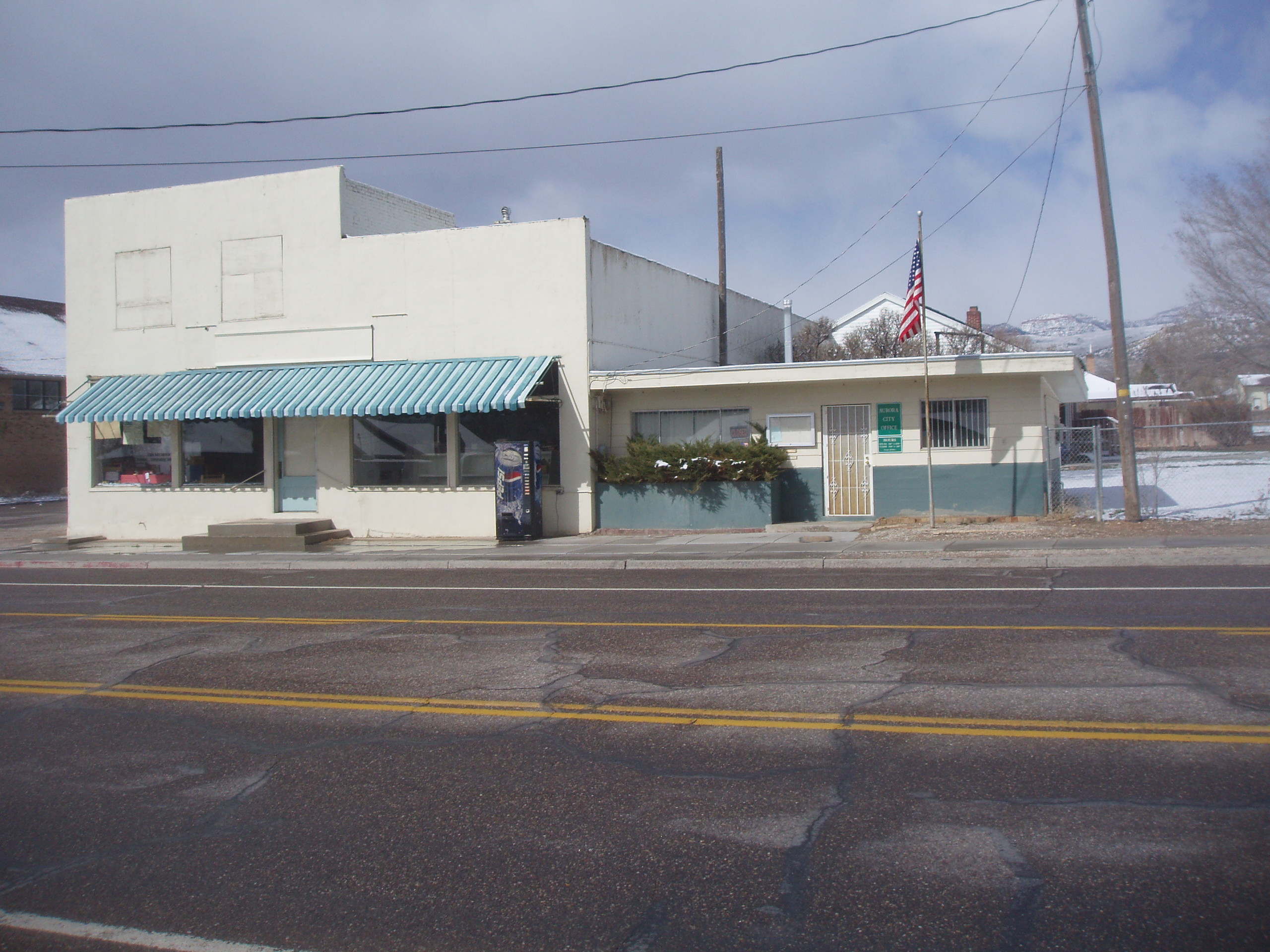
- Aurora city office building on North Main Street (SR-260), April 2010

- Location in Sevier County and the state of Utah.

- Location in Utah Aurora (the United States) Aurora (North America)
- Coordinates: 38°55′16″N 111°56′11″W
- Country: United States
- State: Utah
- County: Sevier
- Settled: 1875
- Incorporated: 1914
- Became a city: January 1982

Government
  - Mayor: Scott Gurney

Area
  - Total: 0.92 sq mi (2.39 km^{2})
  - Land: 0.92 sq mi (2.39 km^{2})
  - Water: 0 sq mi (0.00 km^{2})
- Elevation: 5,200 ft (1,585 m)

Population (2020)
  - Total: 984
  - Estimate (2019): 1,052
  - Density: 1,138.1/sq mi (439.44/km^{2})
- Time zone: UTC-7 (MST)
  - Summer (DST): UTC-6 (MDT)
- ZIP code: 84620
- Area code: 435
- FIPS code: 49-02740
- GNIS feature ID: 1438307
- Website: www.auroracity.org

Aurora is a city in north-central Sevier County, Utah, United States. The population was 923 in the 2020 Census.

Aurora is predominantly supported by agriculture, coal mining, and the service sector. Most residents commute to one of the neighboring communities to work. Children go to school at one of the three schools in Salina Utah. The current growth in the community is attributed to the growth of business and industry in the region.

== Geography ==
According to the United States Census Bureau, the city has a total area of 1 square mile (2.6 km^{2}), all land.

=== Climate ===
This climatic region is typified by large seasonal temperature differences, with warm to hot (and often humid) summers and cold (sometimes severely cold) winters. According to the Köppen Climate Classification system, Aurora has a humid continental climate, abbreviated "Dfb" on climate maps.

== History ==
Aurora was founded in 1875 by Ezra Houghton Curtis (1822-1915), the son of Enos Curtis and Ruth Franklin, and three other families along the banks of the Sevier River. Three men came along and discovered the land. They went back to Provo and started to settle back in 1875, They settled on the bend of the Sevier River, and it had a bunch of Willow trees, so they chose the name Willowbend. The name was changed to Aurora due to the presence of the Northern Lights . It also changed because the colors reminded the Postmaster of the Roman Goddess of dawn. The city was moved west two to three miles along the Rocky Ford Canal to avoid the spring flooding accompanying life along the Sevier. This location also enabled significant cultivation of the foothills. Those families that settled in the region often left the comfortable surroundings of Northern Utah to settle in what one original resident described as a desolate region without a green tree in sight. Over time, however, settlers planted crops, and trees and utilized irrigation to create a very beautiful and livable community.

Nestled in the fertile Sevier Valley, Aurora slowly grew as more settlers moved west. While growth occurred more rapidly in the accompanying communities of Salina and Richfield, Aurora grew largely due to the settling of children of many of the large families in the city. Most current residents can track their lineage to one of the four founding families of the city.

== Demographics ==
Historical population
Census	Pop.	Note	%±
1880	146		—
1890	306		109.6%
1900	385		25.8%
1910	409		6.2%
1920	615		50.4%
1930	568		−7.6%
1940	607		6.9%
1950	614		1.2%
1960	465		−24.3%
1970	493		6.0%
1980	874		77.3%
1990	911		4.2%
2000	947		4.0%
2010	1,016		7.3%
2020	984		−3.1%
2019 (est.)	1,052		3.5%
U.S. Decennial Census

=== 2020 census ===
As of the 2020 census, Aurora had a population of 984. The median age was 40.5 years. 27.7% of residents were under the age of 18 and 17.7% of residents were 65 years of age or older. For every 100 females there were 95.6 males, and for every 100 females age 18 and over there were 90.1 males age 18 and over.

0.0% of residents lived in urban areas, while 100.0% lived in rural areas.

There were 354 households in Aurora, of which 32.5% had children under the age of 18 living in them. Of all households, 65.5% were married-couple households, 8.8% were households with a male householder and no spouse or partner present, and 25.1% were households with a female householder and no spouse or partner present. About 21.2% of all households were made up of individuals and 9.9% had someone living alone who was 65 years of age or older.

There were 370 housing units, of which 4.3% were vacant. The homeowner vacancy rate was 0.3% and the rental vacancy rate was 2.9%.

Racial composition as of the 2020 census
Race	Number	Percent
White	953	96.8%
Black or African American	2	0.2%
American Indian and Alaska Native	0	0.0%
Asian	1	0.1%
Native Hawaiian and Other Pacific Islander	1	0.1%
Some other race	4	0.4%
Two or more races	23	2.3%
Hispanic or Latino (of any race)	23	2.3%

=== 2000 census ===
As of the 2000 census, there were 947 people, 303 households, and 269 families residing in the city. The population density was 936.1 people per square mile (362.0/km^{2}). There were 321 housing units at an average density of 317.3 per square mile (122.7/km^{2}). The racial makeup of the city was 97.68% White, 0.53% Native American, 0.63% Asian, 0.21% Pacific Islander, 0.84% from other races, and 0.11% from two or more races. Hispanic or Latino of any race were 1.37% of the population.

There were 303 households, of which 43.6% had children under 18 living with them, 83.8% were married couples living together, 4.3% had a female householder with no husband present, and 11.2% were non-families. 10.9% of all households were made up of individuals, and 6.6% had someone living alone who was 65 years of age or older. The average household size was 3.13, and the average family size was 3.38.

In the city, the population was spread out, with 33.2% under 18, 9.3% from 18 to 24, 25.0% from 25 to 44, 20.3% from 45 to 64, and 12.2% aged 65 years of age or older. The median age was 32 years. For every 100 females, there were 93.7 males. For every 100 females aged 18 and over, there were 100.3 males.

The median income for a household in the city was $44,911, and the median income for a family was $50,000. Males had a median income of $38,750 versus $20,156 for females. The per capita income for the city was $15,920. About 3.5% of families and 4.2% of the population were below the poverty line, including 3.5% of those under age 18 and 10.5% of those aged 65 or over.

== Notable people ==
- David E. Sorensen — LDS Church leader

== See also ==
- List of municipalities in Utah
