= Central Valley, Utah =

Central Valley
- Town
- Location in Sevier County and the state of Utah.
- Coordinates: 38°42′14″N 112°06′01″W
- Country: United States
- State: Utah
- County: Sevier
- Settled: 1873
- Incorporated: January 28, 2005

Area
  - Total: 2.11 sq mi (5.46 km^{2})
  - Land: 2.11 sq mi (5.46 km^{2})
  - Water: 0 sq mi (0.00 km^{2})
- Elevation: 5,308 ft (1,618 m)

Population (2020)
  - Total: 647
  - Density: 270.5/sq mi (104.43/km^{2})
- Time zone: UTC-7 (Mountain (MST))
  - Summer (DST): UTC-6 (MDT)
- ZIP code: 84754
- Area code: 435
- FIPS code: 49-12260
- GNIS feature ID: 2413189
- Website: centralvalleytownut.com

Central Valley is a town in Sevier County, Utah, United States. The population was 647 at the 2020 census. Known for years simply as Central, the town was named Central Valley at its incorporation in 2005.

== Demographics ==
Historical population
Census	Pop.	Note	%±
1880	199		—
1890	196		−1.5%
1900	291		48.5%
1910	240		−17.5%
1920	233		−2.9%
1930	277		18.9%
1940	282		1.8%
1950	254		−9.9%
2010	528		—
2020	647		22.5%
Source: U.S. Census Bureau

As of the census of 2010, there were 528 people living in the town. There were 194 housing units. The racial makeup was 98.3% White, 0.4% Black or African American, 0.2% American Indian and Alaska Native, 0.2% from some other race, and 0.9% from two or more races. Hispanic or Latino of any race were 2.1% of the population.

== See also ==
- List of cities and towns in Utah
