= Salina, Utah =

City in Sevier County, Utah, United States

- City
- Main Street
- Nickname: North Sevier
- Location in Sevier County and the state of Utah.
- Coordinates: 38°56′57″N 111°51′41″W
- Country: United States
- State: Utah
- County: Sevier
- Settled: 1864
- Named for: Spanish for 'salt mine'

Area
  - Total: 5.83 sq mi (15.10 km^{2})
  - Land: 5.83 sq mi (15.10 km^{2})
  - Water: 0 sq mi (0.00 km^{2})
- Elevation: 5,161 ft (1,573 m)

Population (2020)
  - Total: 2,441
  - Estimate (2019): 2,612
  - Density: 448.0/sq mi (172.97/km^{2})
- Time zone: UTC-7 (Mountain (MST))
  - Summer (DST): UTC-6 (MDT)
- ZIP code: 84654
- Area code: 435
- FIPS code: 49-65880
- GNIS feature ID: 1445269
- Website: www.salina.utah.gov

Salina (/səˈlaɪnə/ sə-LY-nə) is a city in Sevier County, Utah, United States. The population was 2,660 at the 2020 census.

== History ==
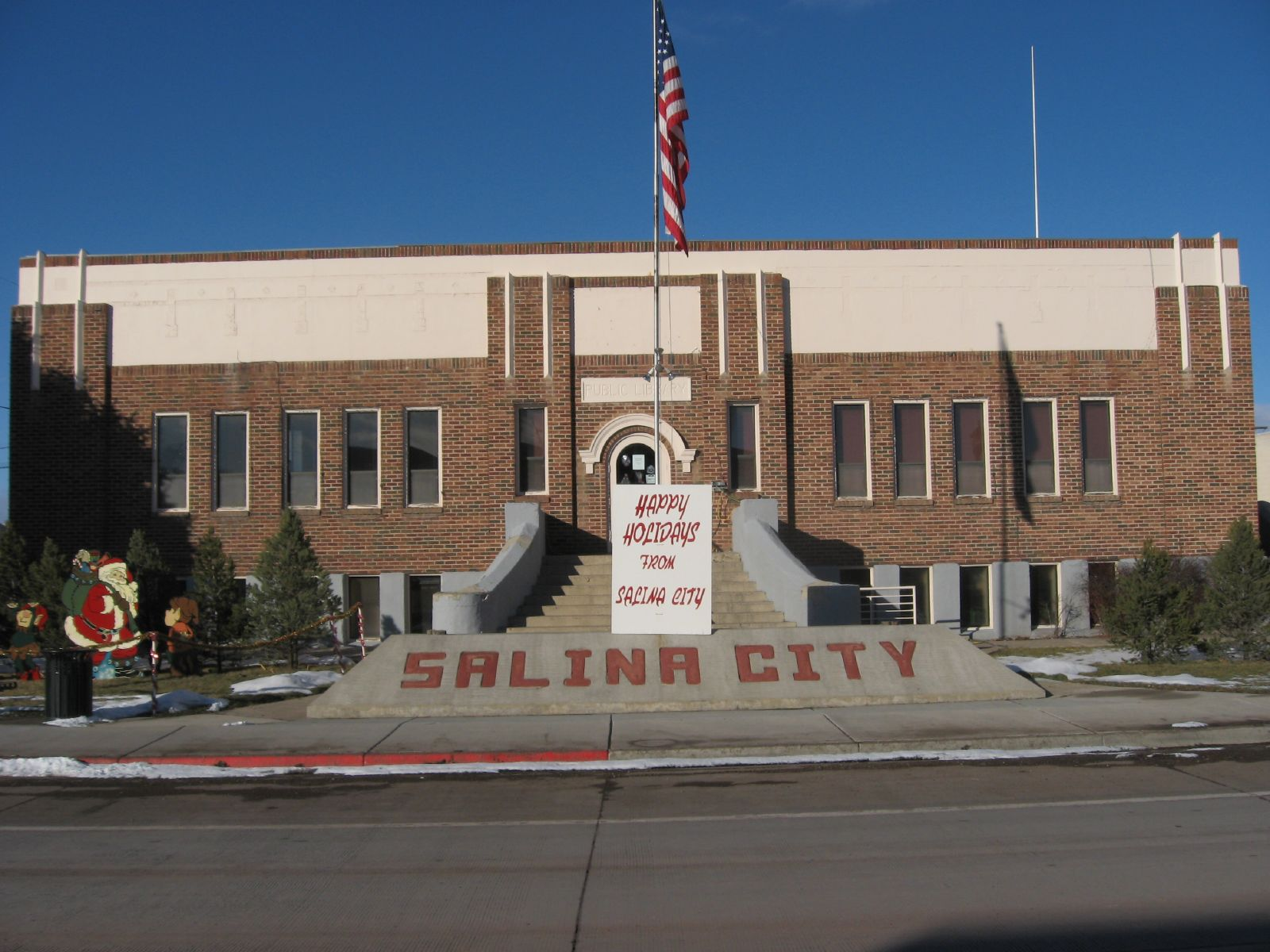
Salina City Hall

The first permanent settlers (about 30 families) moved into the area in 1864 at the direction of leaders of the Church of Jesus Christ of Latter-day Saints. They found abundant salt deposits nearby so they named the area "Salina".

In 1866, troubles with Native Americans who used the area as their hunting ground (the Black Hawk War (Utah)) forced the white settlers to retreat to the Manti area. They returned to Salina in 1871, organized a militia, and constructed a fort and buildings for a school and a church. At that time they discovered coal deposits in "almost inexhaustible quantities" in the canyon east of the settlement.

A creek north of the settlement was tapped to provide water for irrigation, domestic purposes, and to power various enterprises such as sawmills, grist mills, salt refineries and generation of electricity. The Sevier River was tapped in 1874, and by 1908 the area west of the settlement was being fully cultivated.

In June 1891, the settlement was connected to the state's railroad system, and that year the central area was incorporated as a town. It soon became the shipping terminal between the area settlements and the rest of the state. In 1913 the town was re-incorporated as a city.

During World War II, Salina contained a POW camp, housing 250 German prisoners, most of them members of Erwin Rommel's Afrikakorps. On the night of July 8, 1945, Private Clarence Bertucci climbed one of the guard towers and took aim at the tents where the prisoners were sleeping. He fired 250 rounds from a light machine gun and managed to hit some thirty tents in his fifteen-second rampage. By the time a corporal managed to disarm Bertucci, six prisoners were dead and an additional twenty-two were wounded (three later died of their wounds).

This incident was called the Salina Massacre. Bertucci, who was from New Orleans, was declared insane and spent the remainder of his life in an institution.

== Geography ==
According to the United States Census Bureau, the city has a total area of 6.2 square miles (15.9 km^{2}), all land.

=== Climate ===
Salina's annual precipitation averages around 7.82 inches (20 cm), which causes the area to be classified as desert.

== Demographics ==
Historical population
Census	Pop.	Note	%±
1880	438		—
1890	628		43.4%
1900	847		34.9%
1910	1,082		27.7%
1920	1,451		34.1%
1930	1,383		−4.7%
1940	1,616		16.8%
1950	1,789		10.7%
1960	1,618		−9.6%
1970	1,494		−7.7%
1980	1,992		33.3%
1990	1,943		−2.5%
2000	2,393		23.2%
2010	2,489		4.0%
2020	2,441		−1.9%
2019 (est.)	2,612		4.9%
U.S. Decennial Census

=== 2020 census ===
As of the 2020 census, Salina had a population of 2,441. The median age was 35.6 years. 28.7% of residents were under the age of 18 and 14.3% of residents were 65 years of age or older. For every 100 females there were 103.9 males, and for every 100 females age 18 and over there were 103.7 males age 18 and over.

0.0% of residents lived in urban areas, while 100.0% lived in rural areas.

There were 921 households in Salina, of which 38.3% had children under the age of 18 living in them. Of all households, 53.2% were married-couple households, 19.2% were households with a male householder and no spouse or partner present, and 22.0% were households with a female householder and no spouse or partner present. About 25.7% of all households were made up of individuals and 10.8% had someone living alone who was 65 years of age or older.

There were 988 housing units, of which 6.8% were vacant. The homeowner vacancy rate was 0.7% and the rental vacancy rate was 7.2%.

Racial composition as of the 2020 census
Race	Number	Percent
White	2,192	89.8%
Black or African American	1	0.0%
American Indian and Alaska Native	5	0.2%
Asian	3	0.1%
Native Hawaiian and Other Pacific Islander	5	0.2%
Some other race	91	3.7%
Two or more races	144	5.9%
Hispanic or Latino (of any race)	221	9.1%

=== 2000 census ===
As of the 2000 census, there were 2,393 people, 808 households, and 631 families residing in the city. The population density was 388.9 people per square mile (150.2/km^{2}). There were 878 housing units at an average density of 142.7 per square mile (55.1/km^{2}). The racial makeup of the city was 96.66% White, 1.17% Native American, 0.13% Asian, 0.17% Pacific Islander, 0.75% from other races, and 1.13% from two or more races. Hispanic or Latino of any race were 1.30% of the population.

There were 808 households, out of which 45.0% had children under the age of 18 living with them, 65.6% were married couples living together, 9.3% had a female householder with no husband present, and 21.8% were non-families. 19.1% of all households were made up of individuals, and 9.3% had someone living alone who was 65 years of age or older. The average household size was 2.96 and the average family size was 3.41.

In the city, the population was spread out, with 35.2% under the age of 18, 10.9% from 18 to 24, 24.2% from 25 to 44, 17.3% from 45 to 64, and 12.3% who were 65 years of age or older. The median age was 28 years. For every 100 females, there were 99.3 males. For every 100 females age 18 and over, there were 95.5 males.

The median income for a household in the city was $34,886, and the median income for a family was $38,816. Males had a median income of $32,204 versus $16,250 for females. The per capita income for the city was $12,967. About 10.4% of families and 13.8% of the population were below the poverty line, including 17.5% of those under age 18 and 7.7% of those age 65 or over.

== Economy ==
The primary effort of the first settlers was agriculture, primarily to sustain themselves. However, other commercial activities were soon started. In the 1870s a telegraph line, regular postal service, and coal mines were operating.

In June 1891 a railway began operating to the area, and soon the town was the transportation terminus between the area and the rest of Utah, which caused a boom in the town's businesses and its population size. By the end of the nineteenth century the town had a newspaper (the Central Utah Press), a city hall and library, and an eight-room elementary schoolhouse, along with a plethora of saloons, boarding houses and dancehalls.

During the Great Depression a Civilian Conservation Corps camp was established in the area east of Salina, and its attendees worked on dams, roads and recreation sites. Federal agency funding was used to construct a new city hall and library, an improved culinary water system, and a citywide wastewater collection/disposal system.

In the 1940s the Salina Livestock Auction and the Salina Turkey Plant (now part of Norbest) were established, both of which are still operating as of 2009. The Convulsion Canyon mine continued to grow, and became a part of Arch Coal, Inc., known as the SUFCO Mine. SUFCO is currently owned by Bowie Resource Partners.

Salina is currently attempting to develop a 400-acre (162-hectare) commercial site south of town, at the intersection of I-70 and US 89. The effort is being funded by the city and by a grant from the US Economic Development Administration. It consists of 50 lots ranging from 1.5 to 30 acres (120,000 m^{2}) in size.

== Law and government ==
Salina is governed by a Mayor and five-person City Council. It is operated under the Salina City Code, last updated in 2002.

The city operates the following departments: City Police; Planning and Zoning; Justice Court; Maintenance; Library; Recreation Program; Swimming Pool; Fire Department; and the Blackhawk Arena.

== Education ==
The city has one elementary school, one middle school, and one high school and is located in the Sevier School District. The nearest college is a branch of Snow College located in Richfield, 20 miles (32 km) south of Salina.

== Culture and recreation ==
The Salina municipal library is located at 90 W. Main Street.

Salina is at the northern edge of an extensive ATV trail which covers the southern portion of Utah, the Paiute Trail.

== Transportation ==
The nearest airport is the Salina-Gunnison Airport, 8 miles (13 km) north. Its longest paved runway length is 3,815 ft (1,163 m). The Richfield Airport, 22 miles (35 km) south of Salina, has a paved runway of 6,645 ft (2,025 m).

Interstate 70, U.S.Route 50 and U.S.Route 89 intersect in the city, providing surface access to outside areas. The western end of Utah State Route 24 is in Salina.

== Notable people ==
- Earl W. Bascom, rodeo pioneer, artist and sculptor, inventor, "Father of Modern Rodeo", Utah Cowboy Hall of Fame inductee, worked for J.A. Scorup on the Lost Creek Ranch in the mid 1930s
- Dell Loy Hansen, businessman and sports team owner

== See also ==
- List of cities and towns in Utah
- Salina Utah POW massacre
