= Richfield, Utah =

City in the United States

- City
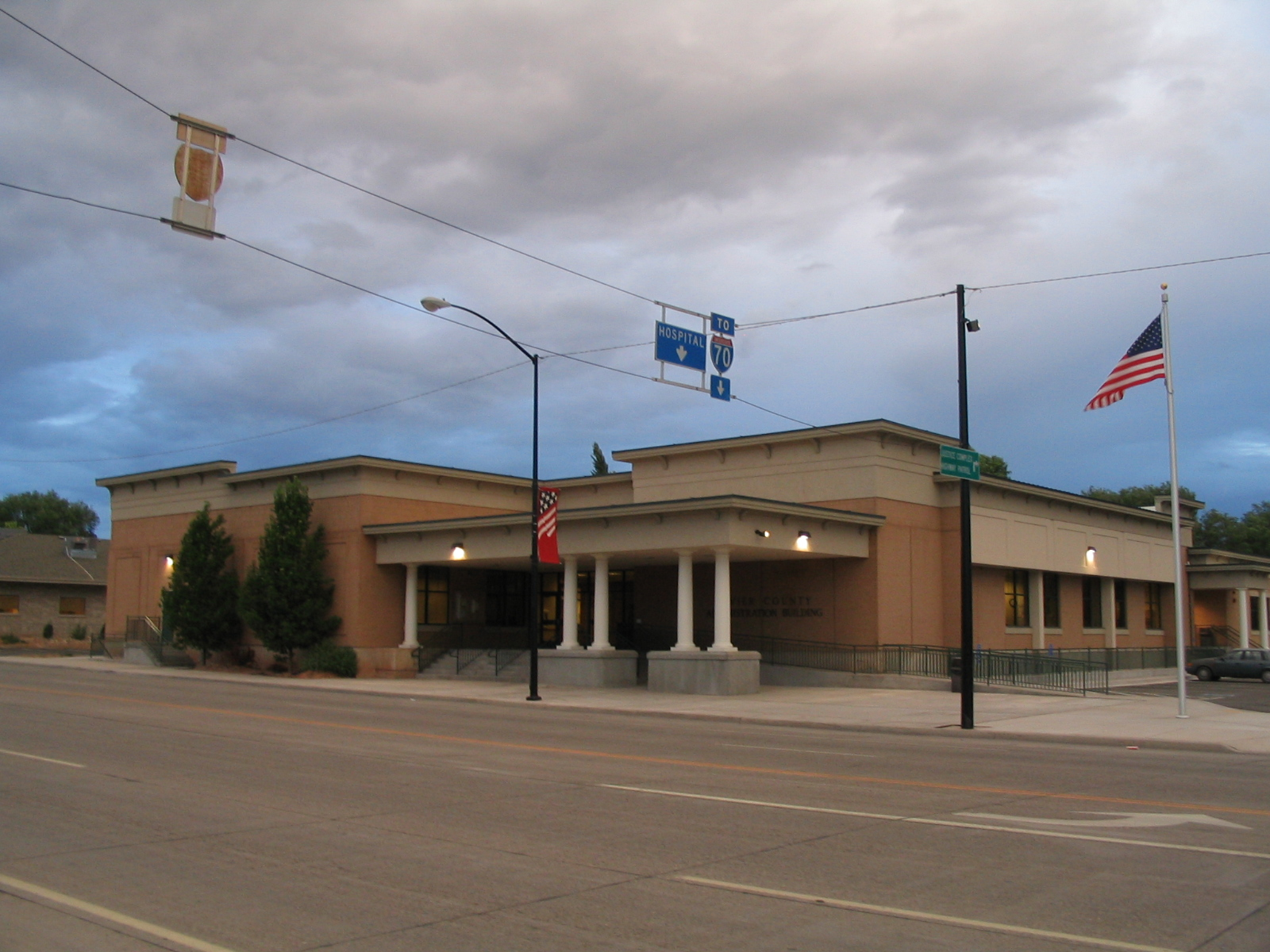
- Sevier County Courthouse
- Nicknames: Red Hill Country; Panoramaland
- Location within Sevier County and the State of Utah.
- Coordinates: 38°45′57″N 112°5′15″W
- Country: United States
- State: Utah
- County: Sevier
- Settled: 1864
- Founder: Albert Lewis
- Named for: Rich fields of wheat

Area
  - Total: 5.93 sq mi (15.36 km^{2})
  - Land: 5.93 sq mi (15.36 km^{2})
  - Water: 0 sq mi (0.00 km^{2})
- Elevation: 5,354 ft (1,632 m)

Population (2020)
  - Total: 8,201
  - Density: 1,330.0/sq mi (513.52/km^{2})
- Time zone: UTC−7 (Mountain (MST))
  - Summer (DST): UTC−6 (MDT)
- ZIP code: 84701
- Area code: 435
- FIPS code: 49-63570
- GNIS feature ID: 1444889
- Website: richfieldut.gov

Richfield is a city in and the county seat of Sevier County, Utah, United States, and is the largest city in southern-central Utah. As of the 2020 census, Richfield had a population of 8,201.

== Description ==
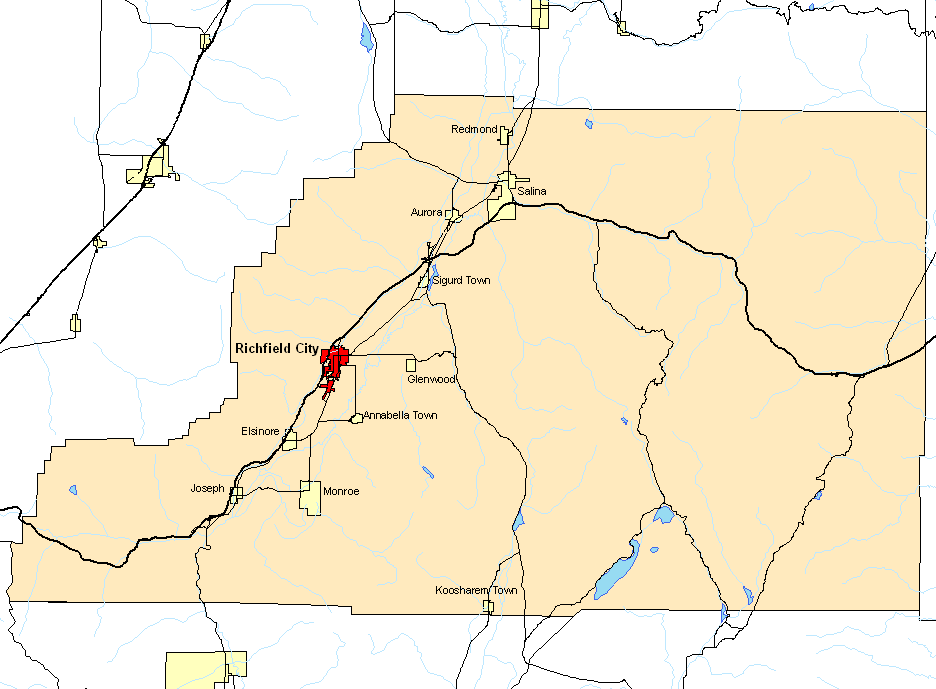
Richfield is highlighted in red

As of the 2020 census, the city population was 8,201. It lies in the Mormon Corridor, just off Interstate 70, approximately 40 miles (64 km) east of its junction with Interstate 15. The county can be best described as "rural diversified" due to the convergence of agricultural, retail and industrial activities. Richfield has developed as a regional tourist center because it is located on the interstate freeway about halfway between Los Angeles, California and Denver, Colorado, attracting many automobile travelers who stop at the city.

Richfield is remote from larger cities, about 100 miles (160 km) or more in any direction from more populous towns such as Salt Lake City. Its remoteness, plus its location on major transportation corridors, makes it central Utah's de facto regional capital, a shopping and "commercial capital of a vast mountain-valley region." Richfield is part of "Panoramaland;" it is on the thoroughfare to several nearby national parks and national forests.

== History ==
Prehistoric people occupied the Richfield area for more than 7,000 years. Fremont culture remains are found near most community sites in the Sevier area. They are dated from approximately 1 BC to 1000 BC. In the late summer of 1776, Father Escalante and his party of Spanish explorers passed through the general vicinity, looking for a trail to link Nuevo Mexico and California. During the late 1820s, Jedediah Smith and other fur traders crossed the area. Sevier County lay on one of the variants on the Old Spanish Trail between Santa Fe, New Mexico, and California and was used by travelers between 1830 and 1850.

In early January 1864, a party of ten men under the leadership of Albert Lewis came from Sanpete County, Utah, and arrived in what is now Richfield. The Mormon settlers found fertile soil, good water, and wood in the nearby hills. They decided that it was a desirable site for a settlement. These pioneers made a dwelling place for all ten men, which they called 'The Hole in the Ground.' They carefully covered this hole with brush willows and other materials and made a crude chimney of rocks. This dugout was located on today's Main Street. These men spent the remainder of the winter in this dwelling, planning and preparing for when they could bring their families.

The early Mormon settlements were abandoned in 1867 due to the conflict known as the Black Hawk War. But, when resettled in 1871, Richfield grew to become a regional center. The coming of the Denver and Rio Grande Railroad in 1891 opened the valley for expanded agriculture, commerce, and mining.

In 1939, Utah Governor Henry H. Blood vetoed a proposal for a junior college in Richfield. Fifty-seven years later, Snow College opened a Richfield campus, which serves about 600 students annually.

== Religion ==
As in most settled areas of rural Utah, The Church of Jesus Christ of Latter-day Saints (LDS Church) plays a prominent role. The Mormons were highly industrious settlers. From 1847, when they founded Salt Lake City, until 1877, they founded 360 towns. Following direction from Brigham Young, Latter-day Saints founded the town and outlying hamlets about 150 years ago. Members of the LDS Church are predominant among the residents.

Even with a dense population of Latter-day Saints, non-Mormons and non-participating members, the latter euphemistically called "less-actives," fill a percentage of elected offices. Due largely to combined influences of conservative rural culture and Latter-day Saints members, the voters of the city and the surrounding county are predominately Republican.

The Richfield area has 20 major denominational churches including The Church of Jesus Christ of Latter-day Saints, St. Elizabeth Catholic Church, First Baptist Church, Sister of Holy Cross, Jehovah's Witnesses, Good Shepherd Lutheran Church, Assembly of God, and others.

== Geography ==
According to the United States Census Bureau, the city has a total area of 5.3 square miles (14 km^{2}), all land. Richfield is located 5,280 feet (1,610 m) above sea level.

Richfield is served by major transportation access – situated along Interstate 70 and within 30 minutes of Interstate 15. Richfield is located 159 miles (256 km) from Salt Lake City and 164 miles (264 km) from St. George.

=== Climate ===
Richfield experiences a cool semi-arid climate (Köppen BSk) with four distinct seasons. Winter high temperatures average in the 30s and 40s with many milder days; low temperatures average in the teens and twenties, with a few mornings starting near or below zero. Snowfall is common, but usually melts in a day or two; however, deeper lasting snow cover is not uncommon. Still, December and January average among Richfield's drier months. Summer days are warm, with normal July highs in the 90s and occasional hot spells that near 100 °F or 37.8 °C. Nighttime temperatures during the summer are comfortable—usually in the 50s or 60s. From July through September, “monsoonal” thunderstorms frequently form over the nearby peaks contributing to over a third of the 8.12 inches or 206.2 millimeters of annual rainfall. Because of its low humidity and mile-high altitude, the Sevier Valley experiences its average first frost by late September and its last in late May, despite the typically warm fall and spring days. Richfield's record high is 104 °F (40 °C), set on July 23, 1931, and July 13–14, 1939, and the record low is −33 °F (−36.1 °C), set on February 6, 1989.

Average January temperatures are a high of 41.0 °F or 5.0 °C and a low of 17.0 °F or −8.3 °C. Average July temperatures are a high of 90.4 °F (32.4 °C) and a low of 53.7 °F (12.1 °C). There are an average of 44.3 afternoons with highs of 90 °F (32.2 °C) or higher, 176.0 mornings with lows at or below freezing, eighteen afternoons when the maximum does not top freezing, and five mornings with minima of 0 °F (−17.8 °C) or lower.

The wettest calendar year was 1936 with 13.00 inches (330.2 mm) and the driest 1976 with 4.36 inches (110.7 mm). The most precipitation in one month was 4.50 inches (114.3 mm) in October 1907. The most precipitation in 24 hours was 2.40 inches (61.0 mm) on December 12, 1906. There are an average of 64 days with measurable precipitation. Average snowfall is 17.8 inches or 0.45 meters. The snowiest year was from July 2009 to June 2010 with 62 inches or 1.6 meters. The most snow in one month was 30 inches or 0.76 meters in April 1912.

Climate data for Richfield, Utah (Richfield Radio KSVC), 1991–2020 normals, extremes 1893–present
| Month | Jan | Feb | Mar | Apr | May | Jun | Jul | Aug | Sep | Oct | Nov | Dec | Year |
|---|---|---|---|---|---|---|---|---|---|---|---|---|---|
| Record high °F (°C) | 71 (22) | 75 (24) | 81 (27) | 90 (32) | 103 (39) | 101 (38) | 104 (40) | 103 (39) | 99 (37) | 90 (32) | 80 (27) | 73 (23) | 104 (40) |
| Mean maximum °F (°C) | 56.0 (13.3) | 62.6 (17.0) | 71.9 (22.2) | 78.7 (25.9) | 87.1 (30.6) | 93.9 (34.4) | 98.3 (36.8) | 95.5 (35.3) | 90.2 (32.3) | 82.0 (27.8) | 69.9 (21.1) | 58.3 (14.6) | 98.7 (37.1) |
| Mean daily maximum °F (°C) | 41.0 (5.0) | 47.3 (8.5) | 57.5 (14.2) | 64.0 (17.8) | 73.2 (22.9) | 84.6 (29.2) | 90.4 (32.4) | 88.4 (31.3) | 80.7 (27.1) | 67.7 (19.8) | 53.2 (11.8) | 41.0 (5.0) | 65.8 (18.8) |
| Daily mean °F (°C) | 29.0 (−1.7) | 34.5 (1.4) | 42.4 (5.8) | 47.8 (8.8) | 56.2 (13.4) | 65.6 (18.7) | 72.0 (22.2) | 70.2 (21.2) | 61.8 (16.6) | 49.9 (9.9) | 38.3 (3.5) | 28.6 (−1.9) | 49.7 (9.8) |
| Mean daily minimum °F (°C) | 17.0 (−8.3) | 21.7 (−5.7) | 27.2 (−2.7) | 31.7 (−0.2) | 39.3 (4.1) | 46.6 (8.1) | 53.7 (12.1) | 52.2 (11.2) | 42.9 (6.1) | 32.0 (0.0) | 23.4 (−4.8) | 16.2 (−8.8) | 33.7 (0.9) |
| Mean minimum °F (°C) | −1.8 (−18.8) | 4.9 (−15.1) | 14.4 (−9.8) | 19.0 (−7.2) | 26.3 (−3.2) | 35.0 (1.7) | 43.0 (6.1) | 42.6 (5.9) | 30.2 (−1.0) | 18.0 (−7.8) | 7.0 (−13.9) | −2.6 (−19.2) | −8.5 (−22.5) |
| Record low °F (°C) | −28 (−33) | −33 (−36) | −12 (−24) | 5 (−15) | 14 (−10) | 20 (−7) | 30 (−1) | 22 (−6) | 12 (−11) | 0 (−18) | −15 (−26) | −32 (−36) | −33 (−36) |
| Average precipitation inches (mm) | 0.55 (14) | 0.45 (11) | 0.69 (18) | 0.59 (15) | 0.97 (25) | 0.43 (11) | 0.65 (17) | 0.71 (18) | 0.79 (20) | 0.88 (22) | 0.48 (12) | 0.61 (15) | 7.80 (198) |
| Average snowfall inches (cm) | 4.3 (11) | 3.4 (8.6) | 2.0 (5.1) | 0.6 (1.5) | 0.1 (0.25) | 0.0 (0.0) | 0.0 (0.0) | 0.0 (0.0) | 0.0 (0.0) | 0.3 (0.76) | 2.4 (6.1) | 4.7 (12) | 17.8 (45.31) |
| Average precipitation days (≥ 0.01 in) | 5.2 | 5.6 | 6.1 | 6.8 | 6.6 | 3.4 | 5.7 | 6.9 | 4.9 | 6.0 | 4.8 | 5.2 | 67.2 |
| Average snowy days (≥ 0.1 in) | 2.5 | 2.1 | 1.3 | 0.6 | 0.1 | 0.0 | .00 | 0.0 | 0.0 | 0.3 | 1.5 | 2.5 | 10.9 |
Source 1: NOAA
Source 2: National Weather Service

== Demographics ==
Historical population
| Census | Pop. | Note | %± |
|---|---|---|---|
| 1870 | 4 | | — |
| 1880 | 1,197 | | 29,825.0% |
| 1890 | 1,531 | | 27.9% |
| 1900 | 1,908 | | 24.6% |
| 1910 | 2,602 | | 36.4% |
| 1920 | 3,303 | | 26.9% |
| 1930 | 3,067 | | −7.1% |
| 1940 | 3,584 | | 16.9% |
| 1950 | 4,212 | | 17.5% |
| 1960 | 4,412 | | 4.7% |
| 1970 | 4,471 | | 1.3% |
| 1980 | 5,482 | | 22.6% |
| 1990 | 5,593 | | 2.0% |
| 2000 | 6,847 | | 22.4% |
| 2010 | 7,551 | | 10.3% |
| 2020 | 8,201 | | 8.6% |
U.S. Decennial Census

The city has seen an increase in population in every decennial census since 1940, at which time it was reported to have 3,584 people living in the city.

=== 2020 census ===
As of the 2020 census, Richfield had a population of 8,201. The median age was 32.0 years. 33.0% of residents were under the age of 18 and 14.6% of residents were 65 years of age or older. For every 100 females there were 101.0 males, and for every 100 females age 18 and over there were 97.7 males age 18 and over.

98.8% of residents lived in urban areas, while 1.2% lived in rural areas.

There were 2,738 households in Richfield, of which 39.2% had children under the age of 18 living in them. Of all households, 55.8% were married-couple households, 16.6% were households with a male householder and no spouse or partner present, and 23.3% were households with a female householder and no spouse or partner present. About 24.2% of all households were made up of individuals and 11.7% had someone living alone who was 65 years of age or older.

There were 2,919 housing units, of which 6.2% were vacant. The homeowner vacancy rate was 1.4% and the rental vacancy rate was 4.8%.

Racial composition as of the 2020 census
| Race | Number | Percent |
|---|---|---|
| White | 7,335 | 89.4% |
| Black or African American | 45 | 0.5% |
| American Indian and Alaska Native | 254 | 3.1% |
| Asian | 27 | 0.3% |
| Native Hawaiian and Other Pacific Islander | 26 | 0.3% |
| Some other race | 149 | 1.8% |
| Two or more races | 365 | 4.5% |
| Hispanic or Latino (of any race) | 402 | 4.9% |

=== 2010 census ===
As of the 2010 census, there were 7,551 people living in the city. The population density was 1,424.7 people per square mile (551.2/km^{2}). There were 2,792 housing units at an average density of 526.79 per square mile (200.9/km^{2}). The racial makeup of the city was 94.41% White, 0.39% African American, 3.29% Native American, 0.26% Asian, 0.07% Pacific Islander, 0.55% from other races, and 1.02% from two or more races. Hispanic or Latino of any race were 2.35% of the population.

=== 2000 census ===
In 2000, there were 2,166 households, out of which 44.0% had children under the age of 18 living with them, 66.2% were married couples living together, 8.9% had a female householder with no husband present, and 22.3% were non-families. 20.4% of all households were made up of individuals, and 11.3% had someone living alone who was 65 years of age or older. The average household size was 2.97 and the average family size was 3.45.

In the city, the population was spread out, with 35.4% under the age of 18, 10.8% from 18 to 24, 22.7% from 25 to 44, 17.0% from 45 to 64, and 14.1% who were 65 years of age or older. The median age was 29 years. For every 100 females, there were 97.1 males. For every 100 females age 18 and over, there were 94.1 males.

The median income for a household in the city was $36,024, and the median income for a family was $40,284. Males had a median income of $33,000 versus $20,489 for females. The per capita income for the city was $14,320. About 7.0% of families and 9.3% of the population were below the poverty line, including 10.5% of those under age 18 and 9.4% of those age 65 or over.

== Economy ==
Major employers in Richfield include Walmart, Sevier Valley Hospital, Lin's Fresh Market, and forest headquarters for Fishlake National Forest. There are also several smaller employers, such as restaurants, hotels, and local businesses.

The local weekly newspaper is The Richfield Reaper.

== Transportation ==
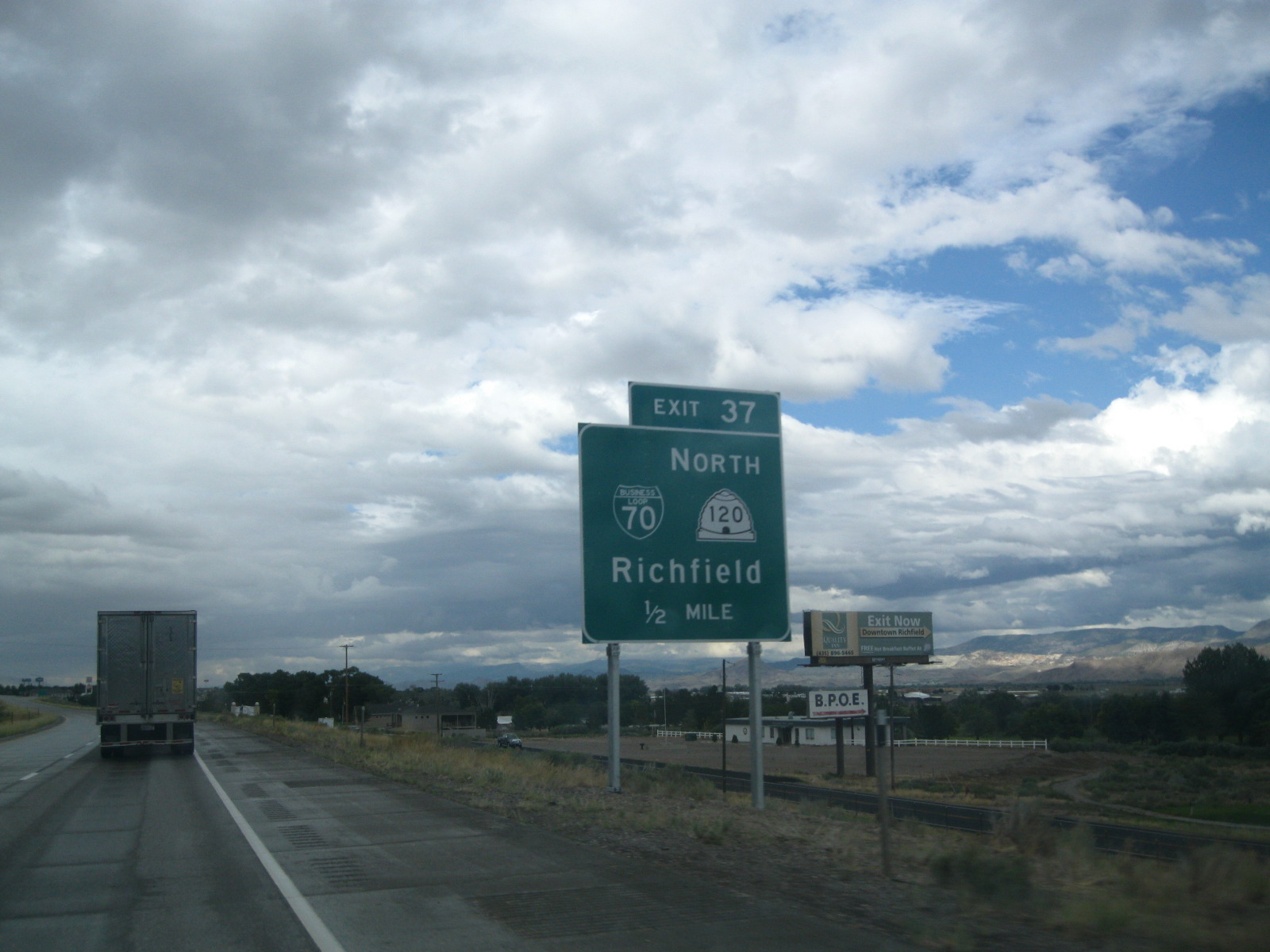
A sign for Exit 37 and Business Loop 70 and SR-120, August 2013

Interstate 70/U.S. Route 89 is the main highway serving Richfield. Utah State Route 118 runs to Joseph. Utah State Route 119 runs to Glenwood. Utah State Route 120 serves as a business loop through Richfield.

Richfield is served by Greyhound to Denver and Las Vegas, Nevada.

Richfield Municipal Airport is located one mile southwest of the city.

== Education ==
Richfield is located in the Sevier School District. There are two elementary schools (Ashman and Pahvant), one middle school (Red Hills), one high school (Richfield), and one alternative high school (Cedar Ridge). There is also a satellite campus of Snow College.

== Notable people ==
- Edward O. Anderson — architect
- Theodore Brandley — former mayor of Richfield, farmer
- Jake Garn — politician, astronaut
- Joseph Hansen — secretary and bodyguard to Leon Trotsky
- Walter Frederick Morrison — inventor of the Frisbee
- Howard C. Nielson — politician
- Cornelius Salisbury — painter
- Mary Thurman — actress, silent film star

== See also ==
- Clear Creek (Utah)
- Fremont Indian State Park
- KUES, PBS station, local channel 19 (a full power relay station of KUED, carrying a remodulated analog signal) KUED 7: Annual Report
- List of Registered Historic Places in Utah:Sevier County
- Sevier River
