= Sigurd, Utah =

Town in the United States

- Town
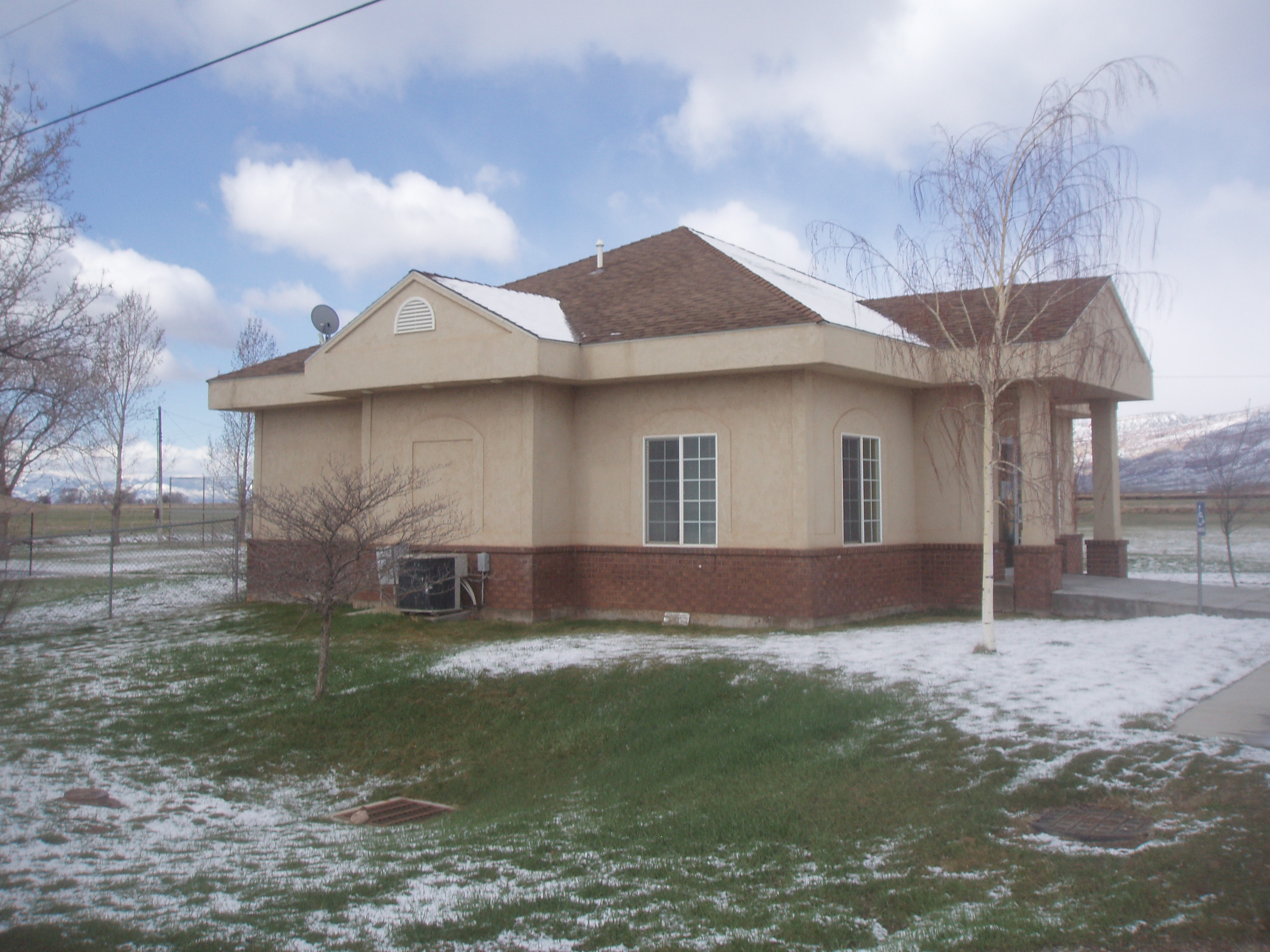
- Sigurd town hall

- Location in Sevier County and the state of Utah.
- Coordinates: 38°51′7″N 111°57′54″W
- Country: United States
- State: Utah
- County: Sevier
- Settled: 1874
- Incorporated: 1935
- Named for: Sigurd

Area
  - Total: 0.98 sq mi (2.55 km^{2})
  - Land: 0.98 sq mi (2.55 km^{2})
  - Water: 0 sq mi (0.00 km^{2})
- Elevation: 5,226 ft (1,593 m)

Population (2020)
  - Total: 405
  - Density: 450.6/sq mi (173.96/km^{2})
- Time zone: UTC-7 (Mountain (MST))
  - Summer (DST): UTC-6 (MDT)
- ZIP code: 84657
- Area code: 435
- FIPS code: 49-68650
- GNIS feature ID: 1445583

Sigurd is a town in Sevier County, Utah, United States. The population was 405 at the 2020 census.

== Geography ==
According to the United States Census Bureau, the town has a total area of 1.0 square mile (2.7 km^{2}), all land.

== Economy ==
USG has a mine and production facilities in Sigurd.

== Demographics ==
Historical population
Census	Pop.	Note	%±
1920	296		—
1930	293		−1.0%
1940	364		24.2%
1950	431		18.4%
1960	339		−21.3%
1970	291		−14.2%
1980	386		32.6%
1990	385		−0.3%
2000	430		11.7%
2010	429		−0.2%
2020	405		−5.6%
U.S. Decennial Census

As of the census of 2000, there were 430 people, 128 households, and 108 families residing in the town. The population density was 411.1 people per square mile (158.1/km^{2}). There were 147 housing units at an average density of 140.5 per square mile (54.1/km^{2}). The racial makeup of the town was 96.28% White, 1.40% Native American, 0.70% Asian, 0.23% from other races, and 1.40% from two or more races. Hispanic or Latino of any race were 2.33% of the population.

There were 128 households, out of which 46.9% had children under the age of 18 living with them, 69.5% were married couples living together, 9.4% had a female householder with no husband present, and 15.6% were non-families. 15.6% of all households were made up of individuals, and 11.7% had someone living alone who was 65 years of age or older. The average household size was 3.36 and the average family size was 3.69.

In the town, the population was spread out, with 36.0% under the age of 18, 10.0% from 18 to 24, 24.4% from 25 to 44, 17.4% from 45 to 64, and 12.1% who were 65 years of age or older. The median age was 28 years. For every 100 females, there were 108.7 males. For every 100 females age 18 and over, there were 105.2 males.

The median income for a household in the town was $32,813, and the median income for a family was $36,250. Males had a median income of $31,591 versus $17,500 for females. The per capita income for the town was $13,377. About 9.6% of families and 11.2% of the population were below the poverty line, including 16.9% of those under age 18 and none of those age 65 or over.

== See also ==
- List of municipalities in Utah
