= Utah State Route 167 =

State highway in Utah, United States

State Route 167
- Trappers Loop Road

Route information
- Maintained by UDOT
- Length: 11.092 mi (17.851 km)
- Existed: 1985–present
- History: Realigned in 1987

Major junctions
- South end: I-84 in Mountain Green
- SR-226 near Huntsville
- North end: SR-39 near Snowbasin

Location
- Country: United States
- State: Utah
- Counties: Morgan, Weber

Highway system
- Utah State Highway System; Interstate; US; State; Minor; Scenic
← SR-165	→ SR-168

State Route 167 (SR-167) is a north–south 11.092-mile (17.851 km) state highway in Morgan and Weber counties in northern Utah, United States, that connects Weber Canyon at Interstate 84 (I-84), west of Mountain Green, with the Ogden Valley, near Huntsville. Nearly the entire route comprises Trappers Loop Road.

== Route description ==
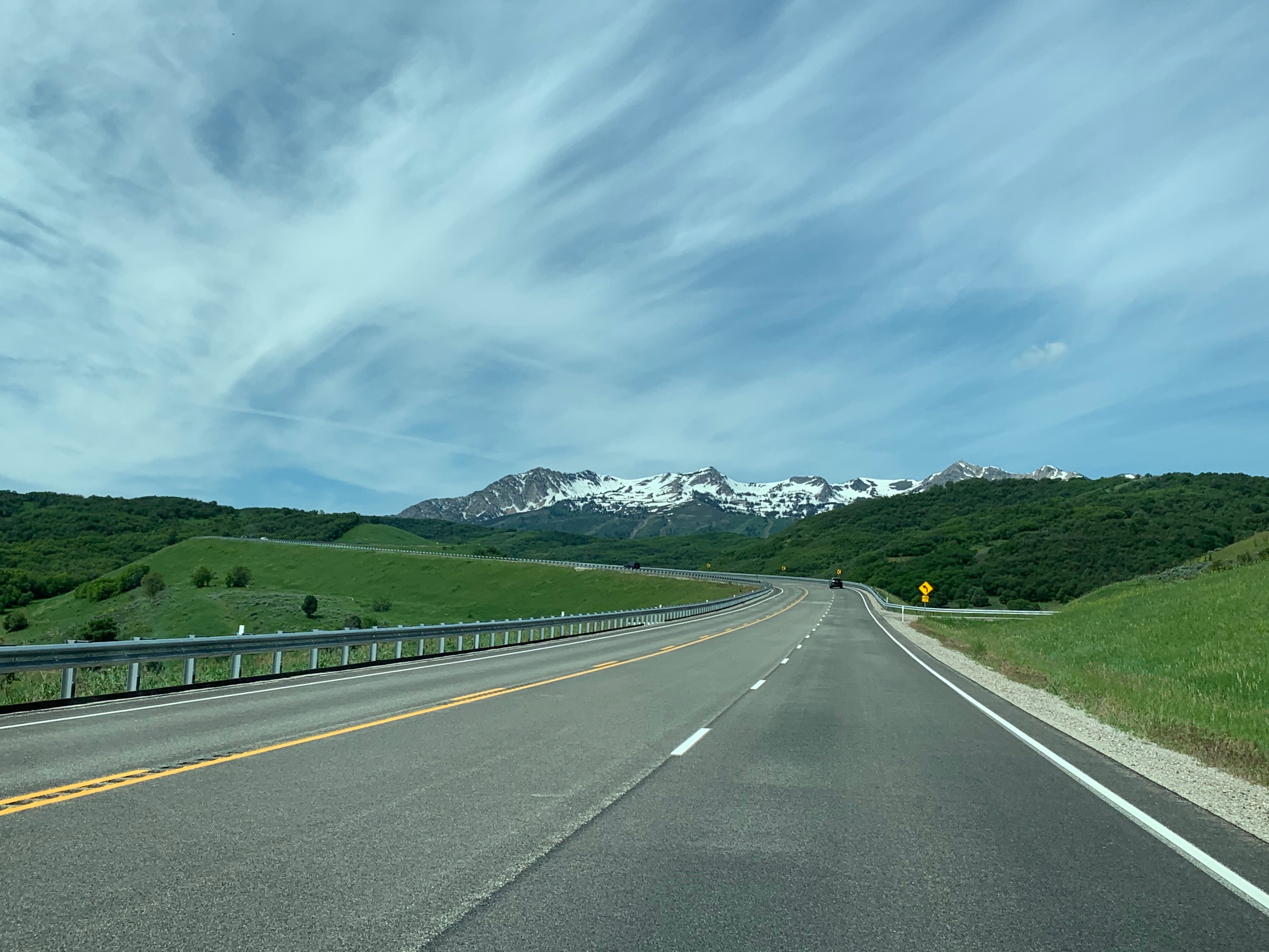
Southbound SR-167, looking towards Mount Ogden, June 2019

The route begins at the interchange with I-84 just west of Mountain Green in Morgan County, and travels east for about 1.5 miles (2.4 km), roughly parallel to I-84. At this point, the route makes a turn to the north, becoming Trappers Loop Road, which begins to climb into the mountains separating Weber Canyon and the Ogden Valley.

After climbing for 5.5 miles (8.9 km) and peaking at 6,000 feet (1,800 m) in elevation, the route crosses into Weber County and passes Utah State Route 226, the primary access road for Snowbasin ski resort. From here, the route winds its way back downhill, to the north, making its way towards the Ogden Valley area. Just before the route enters the valley near Huntsville, it exits the Uinta-Wasatch-Cache National Forest (the entire southern portion of the route lies in the national forest). The route then terminates at the intersection with Utah State Route 39, just south of Pineview Reservoir.

== History ==
The old Trappers Loop Road from the former Utah State Route 5 in Mountain Green to SR-39 near Huntsville was designated State Route 85 in 1935, and decommissioned in 1945. SR-167 was created in 1985 along the same road, from I-84 near Mountain Green to SR-39 south of Huntsville. At the same time, the Utah State Legislature allocated funding for the Utah Department of Transportation (UDOT) to reconstruct the route to state highway standards. Based on the preliminary studies prior to construction, it was decided that the new route alignment would be located one-half to one mile (0.80 to 1.61 km) west of the old road. In 1987, the route was realigned to this location, where the new road was under construction. The old road would continue to be operated and maintained by UDOT until 1989, when the new road had been completed and UDOT relinquished the road back to Morgan and Weber counties. In 1990, the route was extended from its southern terminus, westward to the eastbound Mountain Green Interchange off-ramp on I-84.

== Major intersections ==
County	Location	mi	km	Destinations	Notes
Morgan	Mountain Green	0.000– 0.066	0.000– 0.106	I-84 west – Ogden	Southern terminus; half diamond interchange Access from I-84 eastbound and to I-84 westbound only
Weber		7.033	11.319	SR-226 west – Snowbasin	
Weber		11.092	17.851	SR-39 east – Huntsville, Woodruff SR-39 west – Ogden	Northern terminus; T-intersection
1.000 mi = 1.609 km; 1.000 km = 0.621 mi: Incomplete access

== See also ==
- List of state highways in Utah
