= List of highways numbered 226 =

The following highways are numbered 226:

== Brazil ==
- BR-226

== Canada ==
- Prince Edward Island Route 226
- Quebec Route 226

== Costa Rica ==
- National Route 226

== Japan ==
- Japan National Route 226

== United Kingdom ==
- A226 road
- B226 road

== United States ==
- Arkansas Highway 226
- California State Route 226 (former)
- Florida State Road 226
- Georgia State Route 226 (former)
- Hawaii Route 226 (former)
- Illinois Route 226 (former)
- Kentucky Route 226
- Maine State Route 226
- Minnesota State Highway 226
- Montana Secondary Highway 226
- Nevada State Route 226
- New Mexico State Road 226
- New York State Route 226
- North Carolina Highway 226
  - North Carolina Highway 226A
- Ohio State Route 226
- Oregon Route 226
- Pennsylvania Route 226
- Tennessee State Route 226
- Texas State Highway 226 (former)
  - Texas State Highway Loop 226
  - Texas State Highway Spur 226
- Utah State Route 226
- Virginia State Route 226
- Wyoming Highway 226 (former)

| Preceded by 225 | Lists of highways 226 | Succeeded by 227 |
