= Legacy Parkway =

State highway in Utah, United States

Legacy Parkway
- Great Salt Lake Legacy Parkway Scenic Byway
- Legacy Parkway highlighted in red

Route information
- Maintained by UDOT
- Length: 11.500 mi (18.507 km)
- Existed: September 13, 2008–present

Major junctions
- South end: I-215 in Salt Lake City
- SR-105 in Centerville; SR-177 in Farmington
- North end: I-15 / US 89 / SR-225 in Farmington

Location
- Country: United States
- State: Utah
- Counties: Salt Lake, Davis

Highway system
- Utah State Highway System; Interstate; US; State; Minor; Scenic
← SR-66	→ SR-68

Legacy Parkway (designated as State Route 67, SR-67) is an 11.5-mile-long (18.5 km) four-lane controlled-access parkway located almost completely within Davis County in the northern part of the U.S. state of Utah. The parkway travels north from Interstate 215 (I-215) in northwestern Salt Lake City to an interchange named the Wasatch Weave in Farmington with two intermediate interchanges providing access to Woods Cross and Centerville. Wetlands of the nearby Great Salt Lake and nature preserves border the western side of the parkway while the eastern side roughly parallels Union Pacific and Utah Transit Authority rail lines and I-15. On average, between 20,000 and 23,000 vehicles use the parkway daily.

Construction began in 2006 and was completed in 2008, with the parkway opening in September of the same year. The parkway was controversial in its construction and was challenged in court several times before a compromise was met between the state and the Sierra Club, which limited the speed on the road and banned semi-trucks on the highway except in emergencies. In addition to the restrictions on speed and trucks, the road was reduced from a six-lane expressway to a four-lane parkway. The compromise agreement restrictions had a sunset date of January 1, 2020, at which time the speed limit was increased to 65 mph (105 km/h) and trucks were no longer banned.

== Route description ==
The parkway begins at an incomplete interchange with I-215 in extreme northern Salt Lake County near the Jordan River Off-Highway Vehicle State Recreation Area. The interchange allows motorists from the Interstate to transfer onto Legacy Parkway and travelers to access I-215 southbound. After about 1/4 mile (400 m), Legacy Parkway enters Davis County, and heads northerly with two lanes in each direction through semi-rural Woods Cross. The parkway then turns northeasterly and back north again, meeting 500 South at a diamond interchange, which also provides a connection to Redwood Road (SR-68). The eastern border of the Legacy Nature Preserve is formed by the parkway as it travels north. In West Bountiful, the parkway curves to the northeast as it follows the contour of the wetlands which lie on the western side of the road. Before reverting to its original northerly direction, the route meets Parrish Lane (SR-105) at another diamond interchange. Past the interchange, Union Pacific Railroad and Utah Transit Authority (FrontRunner) railroad tracks run between the parkway and I-15 to the east. For the remainder of the parkway's length, I-15 is located approximately 300 feet (91 m) east. Upon entering Farmington, the parkway gains one lane in each direction and intersects with the West Davis Corridor before terminating at a triple-junction with I-15, SR-225 and U.S. Route 89 west of Lagoon. This interchange is referred to as the Wasatch Weave.

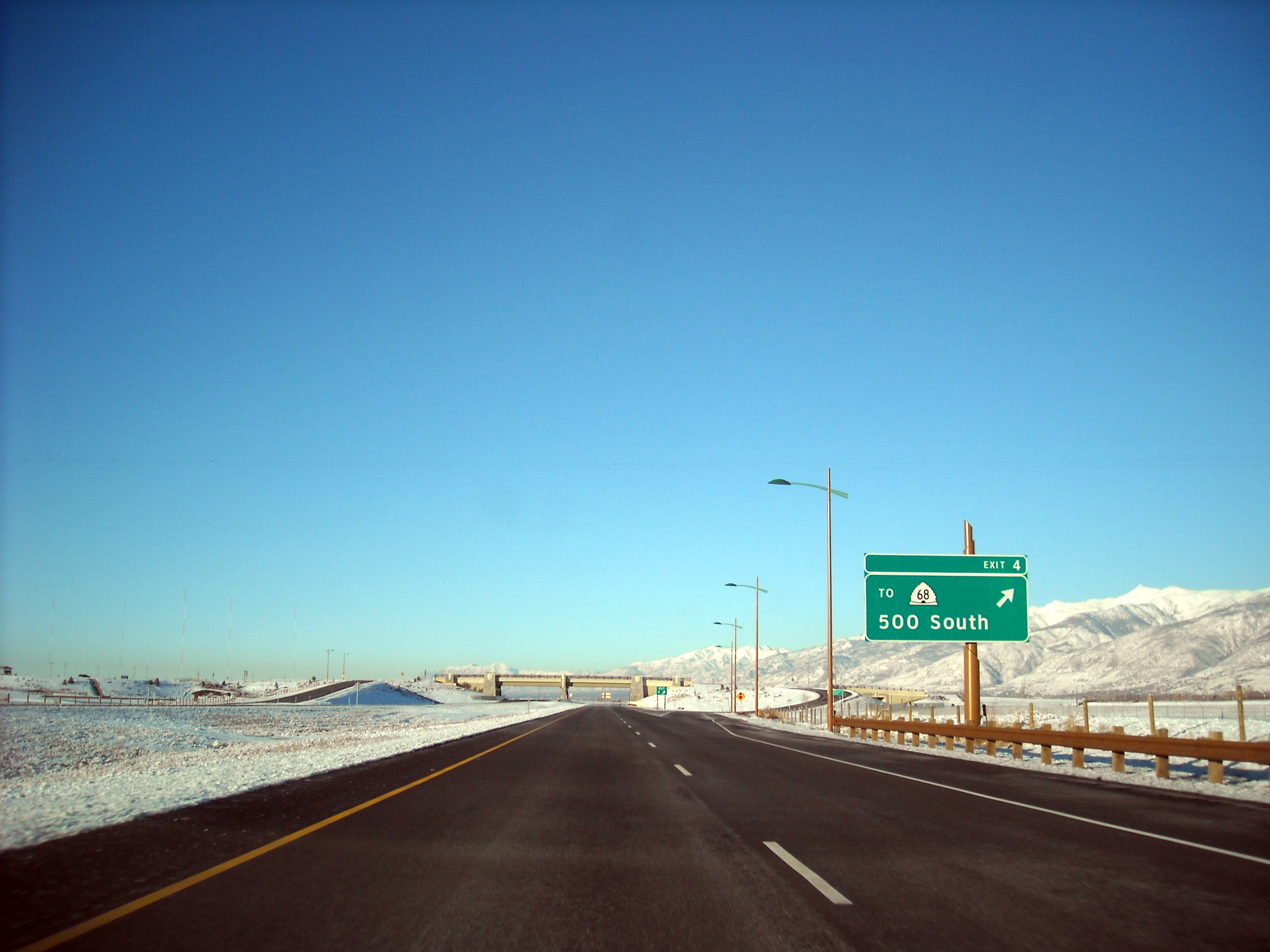
Legacy Parkway approaching 500 South

The design of the road was re-envisioned to include extensive wetland protection west of the parkway and in the parkway median, a trail system along the side of the parkway, and numerous pedestrian overpasses and underpasses for ease of access to the trail system. Many of the architectural features were also specially designed to give the parkway a unique feel. There are a total of 2,225 acres (900 ha) of protected areas to the west of the highway, and an additional 20 acres (8.1 ha) of wetlands along the length of the highway. The Legacy Nature Preserve lays along the western border of the parkway near its southern terminus. Further north, the parkway forms much of the eastern border of the Farmington Bay Waterfowl Management Area. For the entirety of the parkway's length it is paralleled by the Legacy Parkway Trail, and is partially paralleled by the Denver and Rio Grande Western rail trail.

Every year, the Utah Department of Transportation (UDOT) conducts a series of surveys on its highways in the state to measure traffic volume. This is expressed in terms of average annual daily traffic (AADT), a measure of traffic volume for any average day of the year. In 2012, UDOT calculated that as many 22,955 vehicles used the highway on an average day near its junction with 500 South, and as few as 20,240 vehicles used the highway at its southern terminus at I-215. The Federal Highway Administration classifies Legacy Parkway as a MAP-21 Principal Arterial, and as such is part of the National Highway System.

== History ==
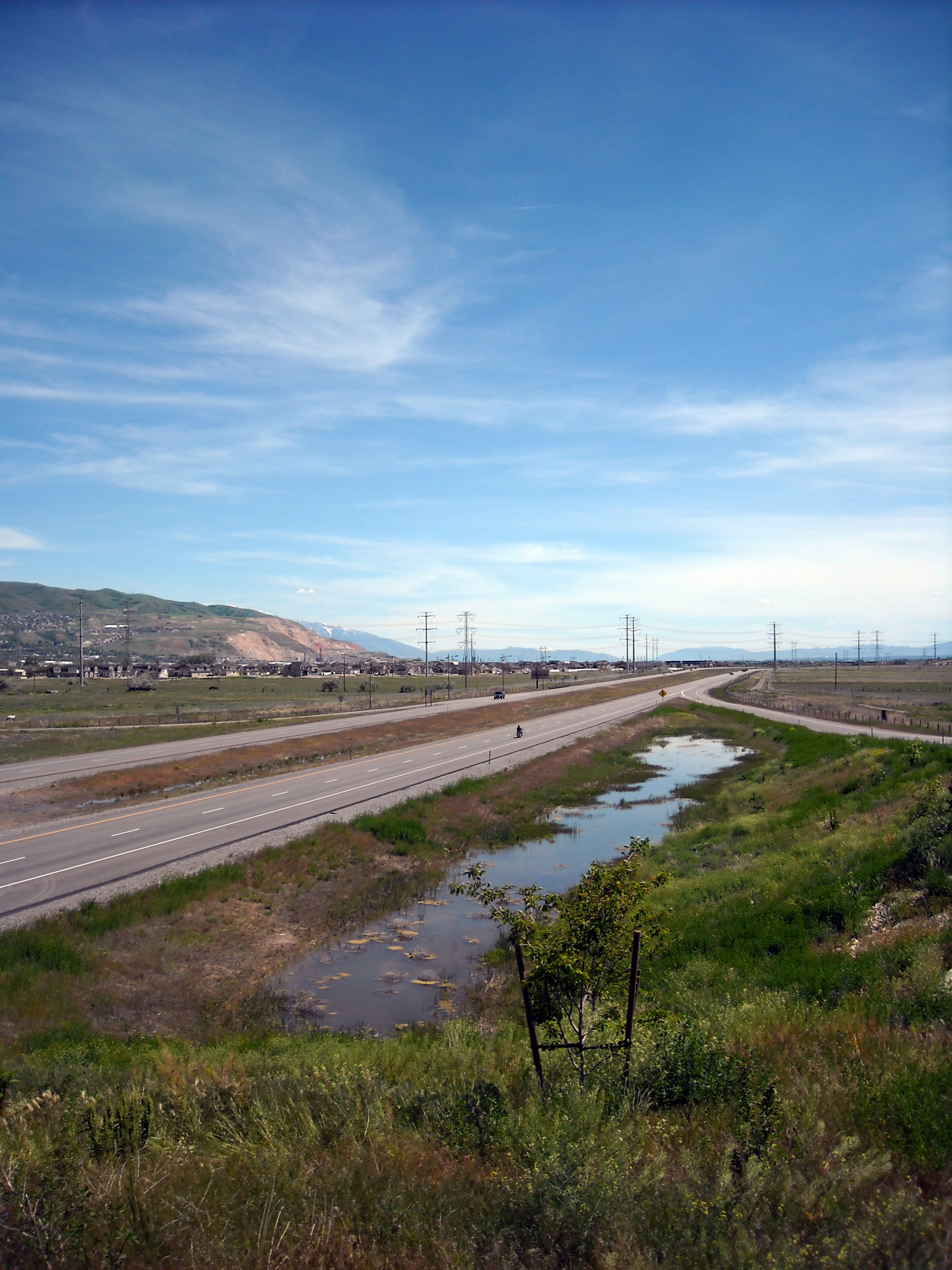
Looking southbound from the 500 South interchange

Legacy Parkway is part of the larger Legacy Highway project first proposed by then-governor Mike Leavitt, which ultimately will run north from Nephi toward Brigham City. The concept of a western Davis County highway has existed since the 1960s, with some proposals routing the highway over Antelope Island or across Farmington Bay. Legacy Parkway was to extend to the west side of the Salt Lake City International Airport and connect to I-80 at 5600 West; however, that plan was abandoned in October 1997. A survey taken by Valley Research for The Salt Lake Tribune in December 1997 showed 64 percent of Davis County residents were in support of building the parkway, with just 19 percent opposing the construction. State officials had hoped to have the parkway open in time for the 2002 Winter Olympics being held in Salt Lake City; however, construction was delayed too many times for that to occur.

Initial construction of Legacy Parkway began in 2001; however, it was forced to stop as a result of lawsuits over the completeness of the environmental impact statement (EIS). A federal appeals court ruled that the EIS was "inadequate" and "...arbitrary and capricious" as it did not study other alternate routes that were less harmful to wetlands that the parkway was originally to be routed through. A supplemental EIS (SEIS), which changed the routing of the highway as well as increased the amount of land to be part of the Legacy Nature Preserve, was completed in January 2005. The SEIS also added in the trail system that now parallels the parkway. On September 21, 2005, the State of Utah and the Sierra Club (acting on behalf of numerous groups opposing the overall Legacy Highway project) officially signed a compromise regarding Legacy Parkway. Some of the agreements reached include no billboards along the route, no semi-trailer trucks allowed on the parkway (except in cases where they are used in response to an accident or there is construction on I-15), which was lifted on January 1, 2020, and a 55-mile-per-hour (90 km/h) speed limit. The speed limit on the parallel I-15 is 70 mph (110 km/h); however speeds in the leftmost lane can reach upwards of 80 mph (130 km/h). Original plans for the highway had included a six-lane expressway, compared to the four-lane controlled-access parkway that was built.

Construction of the parkway resumed in March 2006, with limited construction activity followed by heavy construction on the road beginning December 2006. The parkway earned the Federal Highway Administration's Environmental Excellence Award in 2007. The highway was opened by then-governor Jon Huntsman, Jr., John Njord of UDOT and Stuart Adams of the Utah Transportation Commission on September 13, 2008 around 4:40 PM. The total cost of the parkway was $685 million (equivalent to $952 million in 2023). The original budget for the parkway was $451 million (equivalent to $627 million in 2023). A 5K and 10K run (3.1 and 6.2 mi) and a 20 mi (32 km) bike race were held the morning of the opening of the highway along the main roadway to support cancer research. The route was designated a Utah Scenic Byway (as the Great Salt Lake Legacy Parkway Scenic Byway) on May 16, 2002, six years prior to its opening. Should the parkway be extended further north, significant work will have to be done to reroute the parkway or move the Farmington FrontRunner station and shopping complex which was built just north of the parkway.

== Exit list ==
County	Location	mi	km	Exit	Destinations	Notes
Salt Lake	Salt Lake City	0.000	0.000	1	I-215 south	Southbound exit and northbound entrance; Southern Terminus; I-215 exit 26
Davis	Woods Cross	3.808– 4.236	6.128– 6.817	4	To SR-68 (500 South)	
Davis	Centerville	7.176– 7.664	11.549– 12.334	7	SR-105 east (Parrish Lane)	Western Terminus of SR-105
Davis	Farmington	9.676– 10.164	15.572– 16.357	10	SR-177 (West Davis Corridor)	Northbound exit and southbound entrance
Davis	Farmington	11.500	18.507	11	US 89 north – South Ogden	Northbound exit and southbound entrance
Davis	Farmington	11.500	18.507	12	SR-225 (Park Lane)	Provides access to Lagoon
Davis	Farmington	11.500	18.507	13	I-15 north – Ogden	Northbound exit and southbound entrance; Northern Terminus; I-15 exit 324
1.000 mi = 1.609 km; 1.000 km = 0.621 mi: Incomplete access
