= Utah State Route 228 =

Highway in Leeds, Utah

State Route 228
- Main Street
- SR-228 highlighted in red; SR-228 spur highlighted in blue

Route information
- Maintained by UDOT
- Length: 1.821 mi (2.931 km) Mainline: 1.635 miles (2.631 km); Spur: 0.196 miles (0.315 km)
- Existed: 1981–present

Major junctions
- South end: I-15 in Leeds
- North end: I-15 in Leeds

Location
- Country: United States
- State: Utah
- Counties: Washington

Highway system
- Utah State Highway System; Interstate; US; State; Minor; Scenic
← SR-227	→ SR-231

State Route 228 (SR-228) is a primarily north–south highway located completely within Leeds, Utah, that begins at the northbound off-ramp at an interchange with Interstate 15 (I-15) and runs northeast to another interchange on I-15. There is also a spur that connects with the southbound on-ramp of the southern interchange.

== Route description ==
From its southern terminus at the northbound off-ramp of the interchange on I-15 at exit 22 in Leeds, SR-228 heads northeast, roughly paralleling I-15 along Main Street, until it turns northwest onto Silver Reef Road. After passing under I-15 it reaches it northern terminus at the southbound off-ramp of the interchange with I-15 at exit 23. The spur begins at the southbound on-ramp at exit 22 and heads southeast along Cemetery Road until it reaches its terminus at South Main Street (SR-228).

== History ==
SR-228 received its designation in 1981 when the existing local roads were granted state highway status by the Utah State Legislature. Originally, the route began with the current spur (Cemetery Road) and then headed northeast along Main Street for the remainder of the current route (including the portion on Silver Reef Road), but did not include any portion of South Main Street south of Cemetery Road. However, sometime prior to 1998, the official designation had been amended to reflect the current route. It was formerly part of U.S. Route 91.

== Major intersections ==
The entire route is in Leeds, Washington County.

mi	km	Destinations	Notes
0.000	0.000	I-15	Southern terminus, northbound exit
1.635	2.631	I-15	Northern terminus, northbound entrance and southbound exit
1.635	2.631	I-15	Begin spur, southbound entrance
1.821	2.931	South Main Street (SR-228)	End spur
1.000 mi = 1.609 km; 1.000 km = 0.621 mi: Incomplete access
