= Utah State Route 256 =

State highway in Utah, United States

State Route 256

Route information
- Maintained by UDOT
- Length: 5.595 mi (9.004 km)
- Existed: 1970–present

Major junctions
- South end: US 89 near Salina
- North end: US 89 near Axtell

Location
- Country: United States
- State: Utah

Highway system
- Utah State Highway System; Interstate; US; State; Minor; Scenic
← SR-252	→ SR-257

State Route 256 is a short highway in central Utah that serves Redmond. There are no junctions with any state highways along SR-256 besides the termini.

== Route description ==
From its southern terminus north of Salina, SR-257 heads north from US-89, heading toward Redmond. Afterwards, it returns to US-89 south of Axtell, forming a 180-degree loop around US-89.

== History ==
The road from Salina to Axtell via Redmond was added to the state highway system in 1910, and became part of SR-11 and US-89 in the 1920s. In 1970, after a bypass of Redmond was completed, the State Road Commission redesignated the old road as SR-256. The number was chosen so the state could use existing signs that had been removed in 1969, when the former SR-256 through Aurora (since re-added as SR-260) was deleted by the legislature.

== Major intersections ==
County	Location	mi	km	Destinations	Notes
Sevier	Salina	0.000	0.000	US 89 to I-70	Southern terminus
Sanpete	Axtell	5.595	9.004	US 89 – Provo	Northern terminus
1.000 mi = 1.609 km; 1.000 km = 0.621 mi
