= Utah State Route 252 =

Highway in Utah

State Route 252
- SR-252 highlighted in red

Route information
- Maintained by UDOT
- Length: 6.755 mi (10.871 km)
- Existed: 2007–present

Major junctions
- South end: US 89 / US 91 in Logan
- SR-30 in Logan
- North end: US 91 in North Logan

Location
- Country: United States
- State: Utah

Highway system
- Utah State Highway System; Interstate; US; State; Minor; Scenic
← SR-248	→ SR-256

State Route 252 (SR-252) is a state highway that runs more than six miles (ten kilometers) in Cache County in the northern Utah city of Logan. The route goes from its southern terminus of US-89/US-91 and heads on a northerly path through the west side of Logan. The route's northern terminus is at US-91.

== Route description ==
SR-252 begins at US-89/US-91 in southwestern Logan, near the Logan River Golf Course, ICON Health & Fitness corporate headquarters and HyClone's corporate headquarters, and heads north on 1000 West across the Logan River. On the southeast corner of the intersection with 600 South is Woodruff Elementary School; access from 1000 West was closed before the 2008-2009 school year as a condition of the addition of SR-252 to the state highway system. As it continues north, SR-252 crosses 200 North (SR-30) and 400 North (a proposed realignment of SR-30) near the Cache County Jail. Finally it reaches 2500 North (Airport Road) on the south boundary of the Logan-Cache Airport, where SR-252 turns east to its northern terminus at Main Street (US-91) in North Logan.

The entire route is part of the National Highway System.

== History ==
When the Cache Valley was settled and developed in the 19th century, the north–south road through the eastern part of the valley connected all the towns, including Hyrum, Providence, Logan, Hyde Park, and Smithfield. Later, when Logan's Main Street was extended north and south, it bypassed Providence, Hyde Park, and the newer communities of Millville, River Heights, and North Logan to the west. This more direct route became the main state highway through the area in the 20th century, carrying SR-1 (US-91) north of and SR-101 (now SR-165) south of Logan.

The state legislature designated two routes in 1969 that served the areas east of Logan's Main Street, following in part the old road from the 19th century. State Route 238 began at SR-165 in Nibley, and headed east on 200 South into Millville, then north on that city's Main Street, becoming Providence's 200 West. It jogged east on 100 South (changed to 100 North in 1970 to remove traffic from the city center) to 100 West, and then continued north into River Heights on its 600 East (numbered to match Logan's grid). Finally, it turned west on River Heights Boulevard (changed to 600 South in 1970 to avoid hills), north on 400 East into Logan, and west on 300 South to end at US-91. State Route 237 continued north from Logan, beginning at US-89 (400 North) and 600 East, and following 600 East, 1000 North, and 800 East through North Logan. In Hyde Park, the name changed to 250 East, and SR-237 turned west on 200 South, north on Main Street, and west on Center Street to a northern terminus at US-91.

Other than the 1970 changes to SR-238 requested by the cities, the next change came in 1981. The part of SR-237 on Logan's 600 East and 1000 North, having "more the characteristics of a city street", was given to the city, and in exchange a same-length segment of 1400 North, a four-lane arterial connecting US-91 to SR-237, became a new State Route 239. This left SR-237's south end at 800 East and 1000 North, where SR-288, a peripheral route around Utah State University, went both east and south. Portions of SR-288 were given to the city and university in 1992, and SR-237 was extended south three blocks on 800 East (former SR-288) to 700 North, a city street.

In order to "benefit the long term mobility of the whole region", the Cache Metropolitan Planning Organization and Utah Department of Transportation decided in 2007 that a new western bypass of US-91 through the area would help reduce traffic through downtown Logan. In exchange for its creation as State Route 252, the county and cities agreed to take over maintenance of State Routes 237, 238, 239, and 288, minor roads that did not meet "the eligibility criteria for what constitutes a State Highway".

A western bypass of Logan on 1000 West was planned at least since the 1970s as a local road, but was not completed until about 1990. On the other hand, 2500 North (Airport Road), which SR-252 uses to get back to US-91, has a longer history. State Route 217 was designated in 1941 to begin at US-91 north of Logan and head west on 1800 North to Greenville, north on 600 West, and west on Airport Road to Benson. It was modified in 1945 to use Airport Road directly from US-91, and was removed from the state highway system in 1969.

Construction project

Project Description: The project follows the recently completed environmental document to improve the safety and capacity of 10th West/SR 252 and 2500 North and bring the route up to state standards. On 10th West, work will include widening the roadway to five lanes from US 91 to 300 North (including the Logan River Bridge) and a new west-side frontage road between 600 South and 200 South. Traffic signals and turn lanes will also be installed at 10th North and 14th North. On 2500 North work will include widening to five lanes from 600 West to Main St., plus two left turns onto Main St. As part of the project, the contractor will also close the north side of the 1100 West/US 91 intersection, as discussed during the environmental process. UDOT has selected Staker Parson Company as the general contractor. For background on the entire project, see the completed environmental document at Final Environmental Study.

== Major intersections ==
The entire route is in Cache County.

Location	mi	km	Destinations	Notes
Logan	0.000	0.000	US 89 / US 91 – Brigham City, Garden City	Southern terminus
Logan	2.606	4.194	SR-30 (200 North) – Riverside	
North Logan	6.755	10.871	US 91 (Main Street) – Preston	Northern terminus
1.000 mi = 1.609 km; 1.000 km = 0.621 mi
