= Utah State Route 137 =

State highway in Utah, United States

State Route 137
- SR-137 highlighted in red

Route information
- Maintained by UDOT
- Length: 11.357 mi (18.277 km)
- Existed: 1933–present

Major junctions
- West end: US 89 in Gunnison
- North end: US 89 north of Mayfield

Location
- Country: United States
- State: Utah

Highway system
- Utah State Highway System; Interstate; US; State; Minor; Scenic
← SR-136	→ SR-138

State Route 137 (SR-137) is a 11.357-mile-long (18.277 km) state highway in the state of Utah that connects the town of Mayfield with the city of Gunnison and U.S. Route 89 (US-89) in rural Sanpete County.

== Route description ==
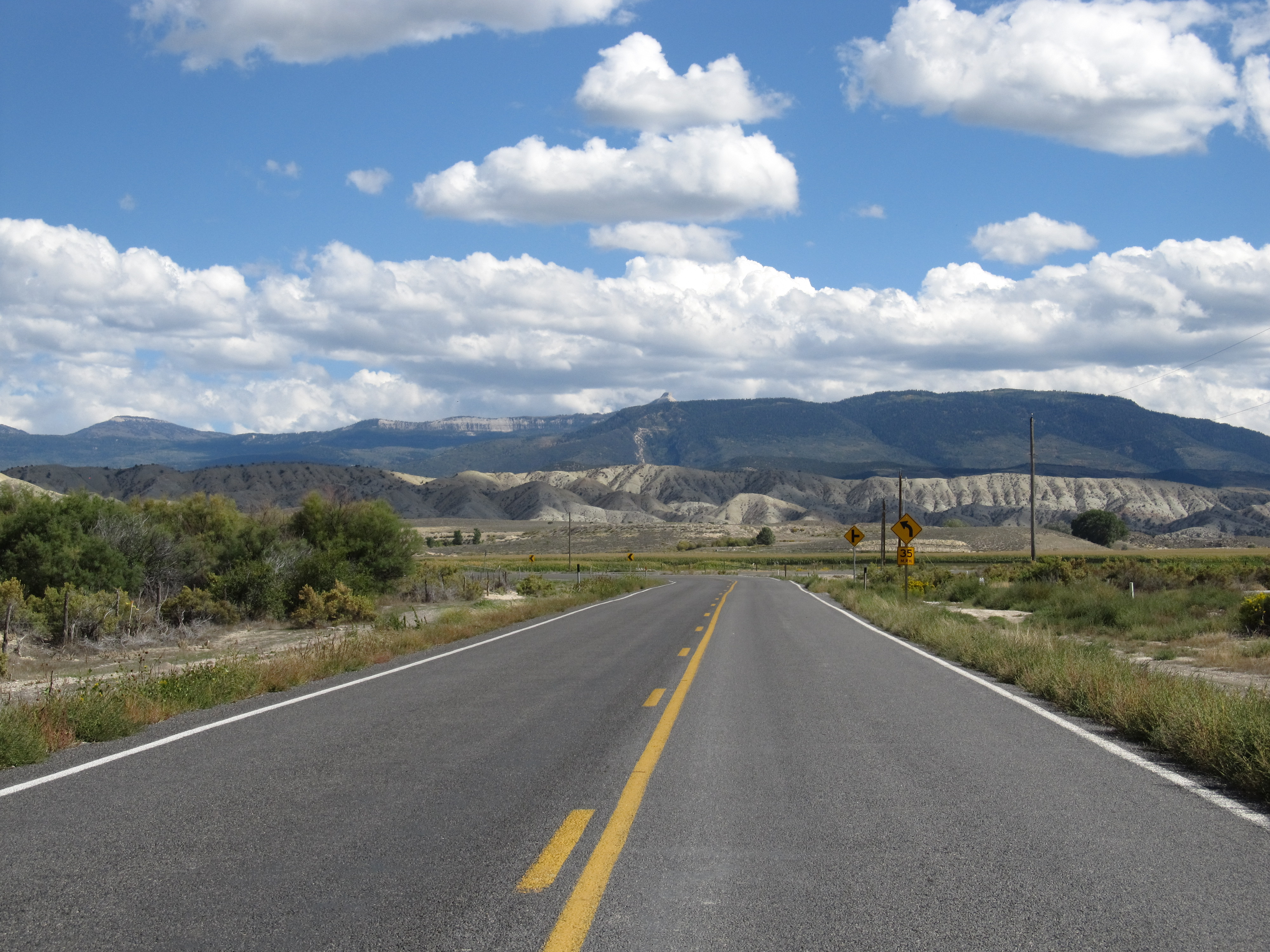
SR-137 looking towards Wasatch Plateau Near Gunnison

State Route 137 is configured as a loop of US-89, with a short southern spur to service the center of Mayfield. It begins in Gunnison as 600 S at its intersection with Main Street (US-89), and travels eastward, turning southeast towards Mayfield as it passes the end of a mountain range. At about the 7-mile (11 km) mark, as the route enters Mayfield's town limits, the southern spur splits off and travels south along Main Street for about 0.5 miles (0.80 km). The main leg of the route turns north on State Street and continues the 3.7 miles (6.0 km) north to its terminus at US-89.

== History ==
State Route 137 was established in 1933 as the road "from Route 89 southerly to Mayfield thence westerly to route 89 at Gunnison". The route has remained essentially unchanged since then, as its current description reads "From Route 89 in Gunnison easterly to Mayfield; then northerly to Route 89".

== Major intersections ==
The entire route is in Sanpete County.

Location	mi	km	Destinations	Notes
Gunnison	0.000	0.000	US 89 (Main Street)	Western terminus
Mayfield	7.130	11.475		Begin southern spur to Mayfield
Mayfield	7.686	12.369	100 South	Southern spur ends
Mayfield	7.687	12.371		Northern branch resumes
	11.357	18.277	US 89	Northern terminus
1.000 mi = 1.609 km; 1.000 km = 0.621 mi
