= List of highways numbered 227 =

The following highways are numbered 227:

== Canada ==
- Manitoba Provincial Road 227
- Prince Edward Island Route 227
- Quebec Route 227

== China ==
- China National Highway 227

== Costa Rica ==
- National Route 227

== India ==
- National Highway 227 (India)

== Israel ==
- Route 227 (Israel)

== Japan ==
- Japan National Route 227

== United Kingdom ==
- A227 road
- B227 road

== United States ==
- U.S. Route 227 (former)
- Alabama State Route 227
- California State Route 227
- Colorado State Highway 227
- Florida State Road 227 (former)
- Georgia State Route 227
- Indiana State Road 227
- Kentucky Route 227
- Maine State Route 227
- Maryland Route 227
- M-227 (Michigan highway)
- Minnesota State Highway 227
- Montana Secondary Highway 227
- Nevada State Route 227
- New York State Route 227
- Oregon Route 227
- Pennsylvania Route 227
- Tennessee State Route 227
- Texas State Highway 227 (former)
- Utah State Route 227
- Virginia State Route 227

Preceded by 226	Lists of highways 227	Succeeded by 228
