= Utah State Route 105 =

State highway in Utah, United States

State Route 105
- Parrish Lane
- SR-105 highlighted in red

Route information
- Maintained by UDOT
- Length: 1.111 mi (1.788 km)
- Existed: 1965–present

Major junctions
- West end: SR-67 in Centerville
- I-15 / US 89 in Centerville
- East end: SR-106 in Centerville

Location
- Country: United States
- State: Utah

Highway system
- Utah State Highway System; Interstate; US; State; Minor; Scenic
← SR-104	→ SR-106

Utah State Route 105 (SR-105) is a state highway in the U.S. state of Utah. It was created in 1965 to serve as a short connector route between Interstate 15 and SR-106 in downtown Centerville. The current route is 1.111 miles (1.788 km) long, after it was extended to the new Legacy Parkway which opened in September 2008.

== Route description ==
Parrish Lane begins at a diamond interchange with Legacy Parkway west of Interstate 15 and becomes SR-105 at a diamond interchange with I-15. SR-105 heads due east, passing through a heavily commercial district before coming to an end at the intersection with SR-106. Parrish Lane continues as a local road beyond this intersection.

Traffic on Parrish Lane between I-15 and SR-106 has decreased 17 percent between 2002 and 2007, with an average of 16,605 cars per day using Parrish Lane in 2007, compared to 20,000 cars per day in 2002. Eleven percent of the traffic on Parrish Lane is bus and truck traffic.

== History ==
The highway was established in 1965 as a connector from I-15 to SR-106 in Centerville. It remained essentially unchanged until it was extended westward to connect to the newly constructed Legacy Parkway in 2008.

As of 2017, the highway thoroughfare Parrish Lane section is home to the commercial district of Centerville, Utah. Major businesses include big box retails stores, several smaller retail businesses, and restaurants. In addition, several professional businesses including real estate, insurance and service-based businesses can be found.

== Major intersections ==
The entire route is in Centerville, Davis County.

mi	km	Destinations	Notes
0.000– 0.043	0.000– 0.069	SR-67 (Legacy Parkway) – Salt Lake City, Farmington	Western terminus; Legacy Parkway exit 7; diamond interchange
0.454– 0.527	0.731– 0.848	I-15 / US 89 – Salt Lake City, Ogden	I-15 exit 319; diamond interchange
0.589	0.948	Frontage Road	
0.653	1.051	Market Place Drive	
0.771	1.241	400 West	
1.020	1.642	100 West	
1.111	1.788	SR-106 (Main Street)	Eastern terminus
1.000 mi = 1.609 km; 1.000 km = 0.621 mi
