= Utah State Route 180 =

State highway in Utah, United States

State Route 180
- SR-180 highlighted in red

Route information
- Maintained by UDOT
- Length: 1.051 mi (1.691 km)
- Existed: 1961–present

Major junctions
- South end: I-15 in American Fork
- North end: US 89 in American Fork

Location
- Country: United States
- State: Utah

Highway system
- Utah State Highway System; Interstate; US; State; Minor; Scenic
← SR-178	→ SR-186

State Route 180 (SR-180) is a state highway in the U.S. state of Utah. Spanning just 1 mile (1.6 km), it serves as a connector between Interstate 15 and US-89 (State Street) in American Fork.

== Route description ==
State Route 180, a minor arterial connector, starts at Interstate 15's southbound ramp for exit 276, a diamond interchange. The route proceeds north on 500 East, crossing the interchange via an overpass, and continues through American Fork for 1.0 mile (1.6 km) until terminating at US-89, known locally as State Street.

== History ==
In the late 1950s and early 1960s, Interstate 15 was constructed in Utah County, parallel to the main north-south thoroughfare, US-89 / US-91 (designated as Route 1 by the state legislature). State Route 180 was established in 1961 to connect the new interstate and Route 1. The route has remained unchanged since then, undergoing only wording changes in the description to accommodate the realignment of Route 1 to the interstate, and its subsequent renumbering.

== Major intersections ==
The entire route is in American Fork, Utah County.

mi	km	Destinations	Notes
0.000	0.000	I-15 south – Las Vegas	Southern terminus
0.222	0.357	I-15 north – Salt Lake City	
1.051	1.691	US 89 (State Street)	Northern terminus
1.000 mi = 1.609 km; 1.000 km = 0.621 mi
