= List of highways numbered 225 =

The following highways are numbered 225:

== Canada ==
- Manitoba Provincial Road 225
- Prince Edward Island Route 225
- Quebec Route 225
- Saskatchewan Highway 225
- Dendobeno Highway 225

== China ==
- China National Highway 225

== Costa Rica ==
- National Route 225

== Japan ==
- Japan National Route 225

== United Kingdom ==
- A225 road
- B225 road

== United States ==
- Colorado Interstate 225
- Alabama State Route 225
- Arkansas Highway 225
- California State Route 225
- Florida State Road 225 (former)
- Georgia State Route 225
- Indiana State Road 225
- Iowa Highway 225 (former)
- Kentucky Route 225
- Maine State Route 225
- Maryland Route 225
- Massachusetts Route 225
- Minnesota State Highway 225
- Montana Secondary Highway 225
- Nevada State Route 225
- New Mexico State Road 225
- New York State Route 225
- North Carolina Highway 225
- Ohio State Route 225
- Oregon Route 225
- Pennsylvania Route 225
- South Carolina Highway 225
- Tennessee State Route 225
- Texas State Highway 225
- Utah State Route 225
- Vermont Route 225
- Virginia State Route 225
- Washington State Route 225
- Wyoming Highway 225

Preceded by 224	Lists of highways 225	Succeeded by 226
