= Utah State Route 227 =

State highway in Utah, United States

State Route 227
- SR-227 highlighted in red

Route information
- Maintained by UDOT
- Length: 0.704 mi (1,133 m)
- Existed: 1964–present

Major junctions
- South end: I-15 / US 89 in Farmington
- North end: SR-106 in Farmington

Location
- Country: United States
- State: Utah

Highway system
- Utah State Highway System; Interstate; US; State; Minor; Scenic
← SR-226	→ SR-228

State Route 227 (SR-227) is a state highway in the U.S. state of Utah that spans 0.704 miles (1.133 km) in Farmington, Davis County. The route connects I-15 to SR-106.

== Route description ==
The route starts as 200 West in Farmington at the end of I-15 exit 322. From there, it travels north approximately one half mile until it intersects State Street, at which point it turns to the east and becomes State Street, continuing east until it ends at the intersection of SR-106 (Main Street).

== History ==
State Route 227 was formed in 1964, coinciding with the construction of I-15 through Davis County. It originally went north from an interchange with the interstate north via Walker Lane, then east on State Street to SR-106, which is the route that SR-227 is currently on. No changes have been applied to the highway.

== Major intersections ==
The entire route is in Farmington, Davis County.

mi	km	Destinations	Notes
0.000	0.000	I-15	Southern terminus
0.704	1.133	SR-106 (Main Street)	Northern terminus
1.000 mi = 1.609 km; 1.000 km = 0.621 mi

== See also ==
- List of state highways in Utah
