= U.S. Route 89 in Utah =

Section of U.S. Highway in Utah, United States

U.S. Route 89
- US 89 highlighted in red

Route information
- Maintained by UDOT
- Length: 502.577 mi (808.819 km)
- Existed: 1926–present
- Tourist routes: Logan Canyon Scenic Byway

Major junctions
- South end: US 89 at the Arizona state line in Greenehaven, AZ
- I-70 near Joseph; US 50 in Salina; US 6 in Thistle; I-15 in Lehi; I-215 in Murray; I-80 in Salt Lake City; I-15 in Salt Lake City–North Salt Lake; I-15 in Bountiful; I-84 near Uintah; US 91 in Brigham City
- North end: US 89 at the Idaho state line near Garden City

Location
- Country: United States
- State: Utah
- Counties: Kane, Garfield, Piute, Sevier, Sanpete, Utah, Salt Lake, Davis, Weber, Box Elder, Cache, Rich

Highway system
- United States Numbered Highway System; List; Special; Divided; Utah State Highway System; Interstate; US; State; Minor; Scenic
← SR-88	→ US 89A

U.S. Route 89 (US 89) in the U.S. state of Utah is a north–south United States Highway spanning more than 502 miles (807.891 km) through the central part of the state, making it the longest road in Utah. Between Provo and Brigham City, US-89 serves as a local road, paralleling (and occasionally concurring with) Interstate 15, but the portions from Arizona north to Provo and Brigham City northeast to Wyoming serve separate corridors. The former provides access to several national parks and Arizona, and the latter connects I-15 with Logan, the state's only Metropolitan Statistical Area not on the Interstate.

When US-89 was established in the state in 1926, the road initially extended north to US-91 in Spanish Fork. Following the extension of the former to the Canada–US border, Interstate 15 was constructed roughly paralleling US-89 to the west and replacing US-91 south of Brigham City. During this process, US-89 was rerouted in southern Utah and northern Arizona, with the old roadway becoming US-89A.

== Route description ==
=== Arizona border to I-70 ===
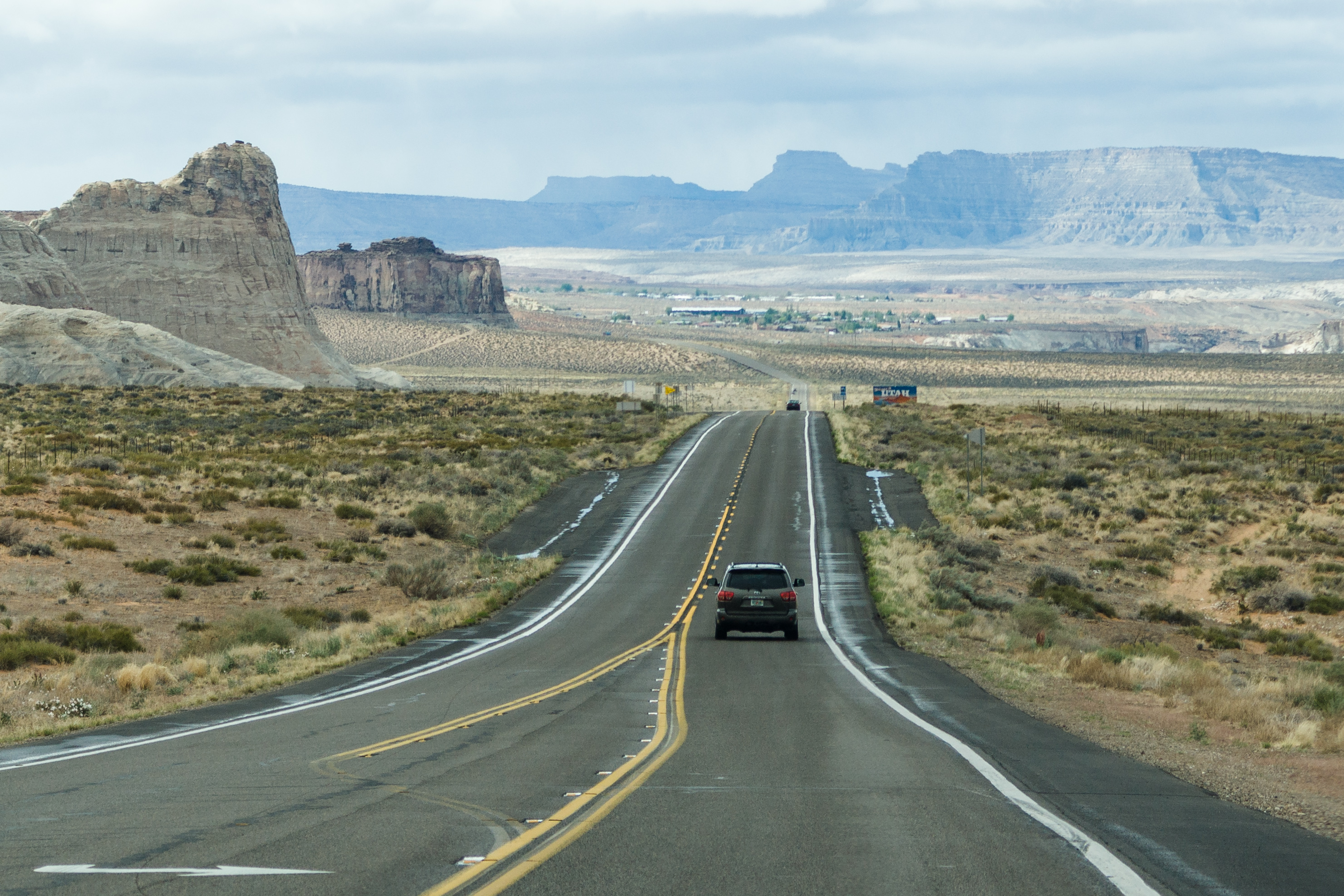
U.S. Route 89 at the border of Arizona and Utah

US-89 enters Utah from the south inside the Glen Canyon National Recreation Area, about 7 miles (11 km) north of the Glen Canyon Dam, where it crosses the Colorado River near Page, Arizona. After leaving the recreation area and passing the small town of Big Water, the highway curves west through the Grand Staircase–Escalante National Monument. US-89 stays near the monument's southern boundary, crossing the East Clark Bench and The Cockscomb and passing south of the Vermilion Cliffs of the Grand Staircase. At the city of Kanab, US-89 meets the north end of US-89A, an alternate route south into Arizona, and abruptly turns north and begins climbing the staircase. Here the Mount Carmel Scenic Byway begins; one of the Utah Scenic Byways, it stretches north to SR-12 at Bryce Canyon Junction. The Vermilion Cliffs are ascended via the canyon carved by Kanab Creek. Near the White Cliffs, US-89 meets SR-9 at Mt. Carmel Junction, where travelers can turn to reach Zion National Park. The final "step" is the Pink Cliffs, where the highway follows alongside the Virgin River to the highest point on US-89 in southern Utah and the east end of SR-14, a summit at Long Valley Junction (elevation 7,450 feet; 2,270 m).

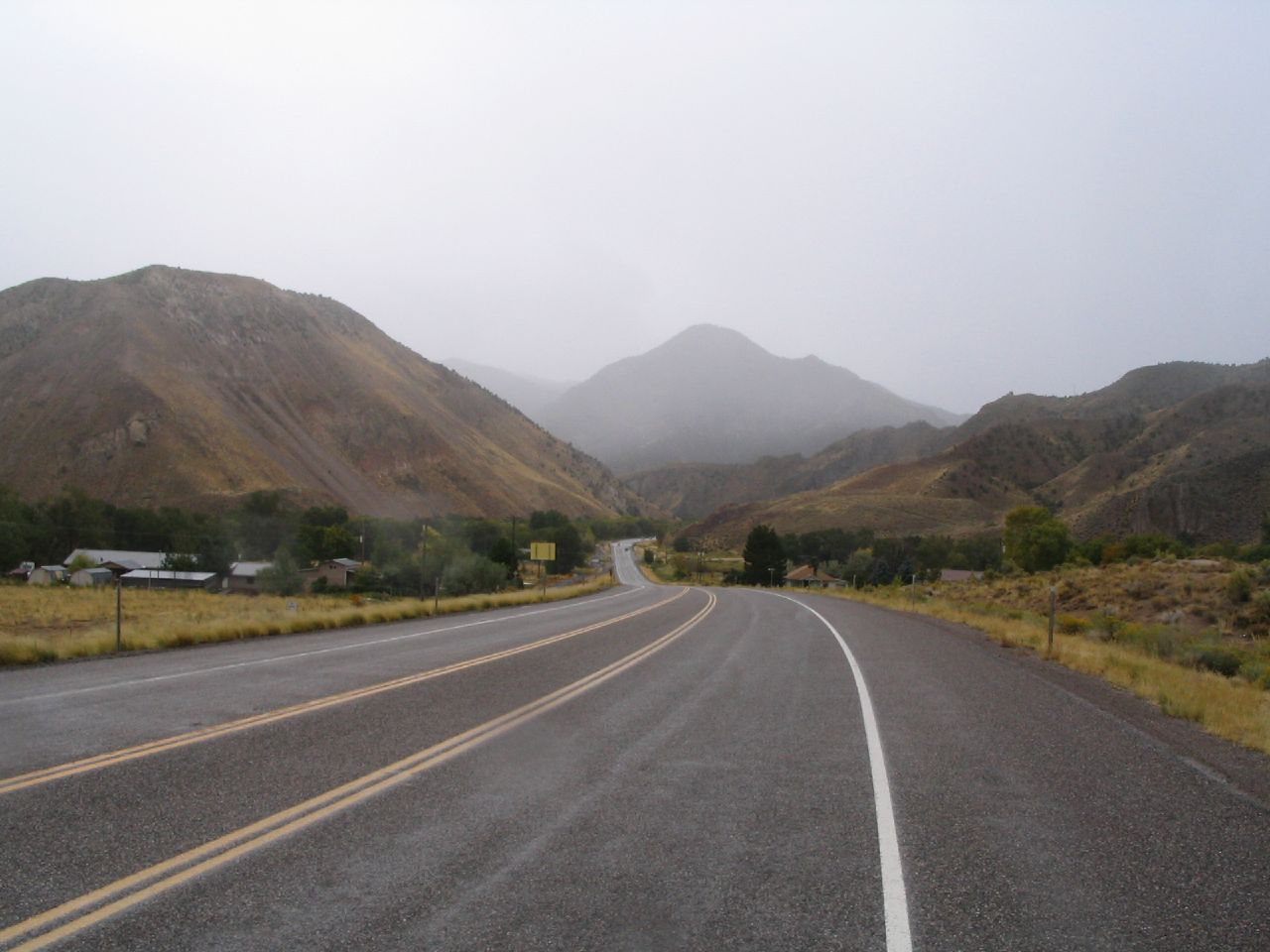
Looking south from Sevier towards the Marysvale Canyon

North from Long Valley Junction, US-89 descends through the valley of the Sevier River, meeting SR-12, a scenic highway that leads to Bryce Canyon National Park, at Bryce Canyon Junction, SR-143 in Panguitch (which leads to Cedar Breaks National Monument), and SR-20 at Bear Valley Junction. As the highway continues north, the valley narrows significantly into the Circleville Canyon before opening out near the town of Circleville. In this part of the valley, the Sevier River is dammed to create the Piute Reservoir, and US-89 meets SR-62 near Kingston. North of Marysvale, the valley again narrows into the Marysvale Canyon, which carries the river to its confluence with Clear Creek and US-89 to its overlap with Interstate 70, beginning at Sevier.

=== I-70 to the Wasatch Front ===
Although US-89 follows the I-70 freeway from Sevier to Salina, the old alignment can still be driven, and is state-maintained north of Elsinore as SR-258, SR-118 (which overlaps I-70 Business through Richfield), SR-24, and US-50. Both highways stay mainly in the west half of the Sevier River's valley, with the faster I-70/US-89 bypassing the surface road's communities. Just south of Salina, I-70 curves to the east, rising alongside Salina Creek, and US-89 exits into downtown Salina, where it rejoins its pre-freeway alignment. US-50 overlaps US-89 between I-70 and Salina, following I-70 east and a separate alignment northwest from the area; the short Interstate 70 Business also uses this roadway as a business spur from I-70 to the city. North of Salina, US-89 bypasses Redmond (SR-256 follows the former route through the town) and passes through Centerfield to Gunnison, where it meets SR-28 and finally turns away from the Sevier River.

At Gunnison, US-89 turns east before curving northeast into the Sanpete Valley, formed by the San Pitch River, a tributary of the Sevier River. Along US-89 in this valley are several small cities: Manti, Ephraim, Mount Pleasant, and Fairview. Between Ephraim and Mount Pleasant, US-89 meets the south end of SR-132 at Pigeon Hollow Junction. SR-132 was formerly US-189, connecting US-89 with US-91 in Nephi. Beyond Fairview, where the scenic SR-31 turns east, US-89 climbs out of the valley, reaching a summit at Hill Top (elevation 6,400 feet; 2,000 m). Thistle Creek parallels the next leg of the highway, descending through a canyon to the junction with US-6 near the ghost town of Thistle, flooded by a landslide in 1983. Thistle Creek and Soldier Creek, paralleled by US-89 and US-6, merge near this junction to form Spanish Fork, which the overlapped routes follow northwest through Spanish Fork Canyon into the Utah Valley at Moark Junction. US-89 splits to the north from US-6 there, skirts the west edge of Mapleton, and merges with SR-51 - the old Arrowhead Trail (US-91) - south of downtown Springville.

=== Southern Wasatch Front ===
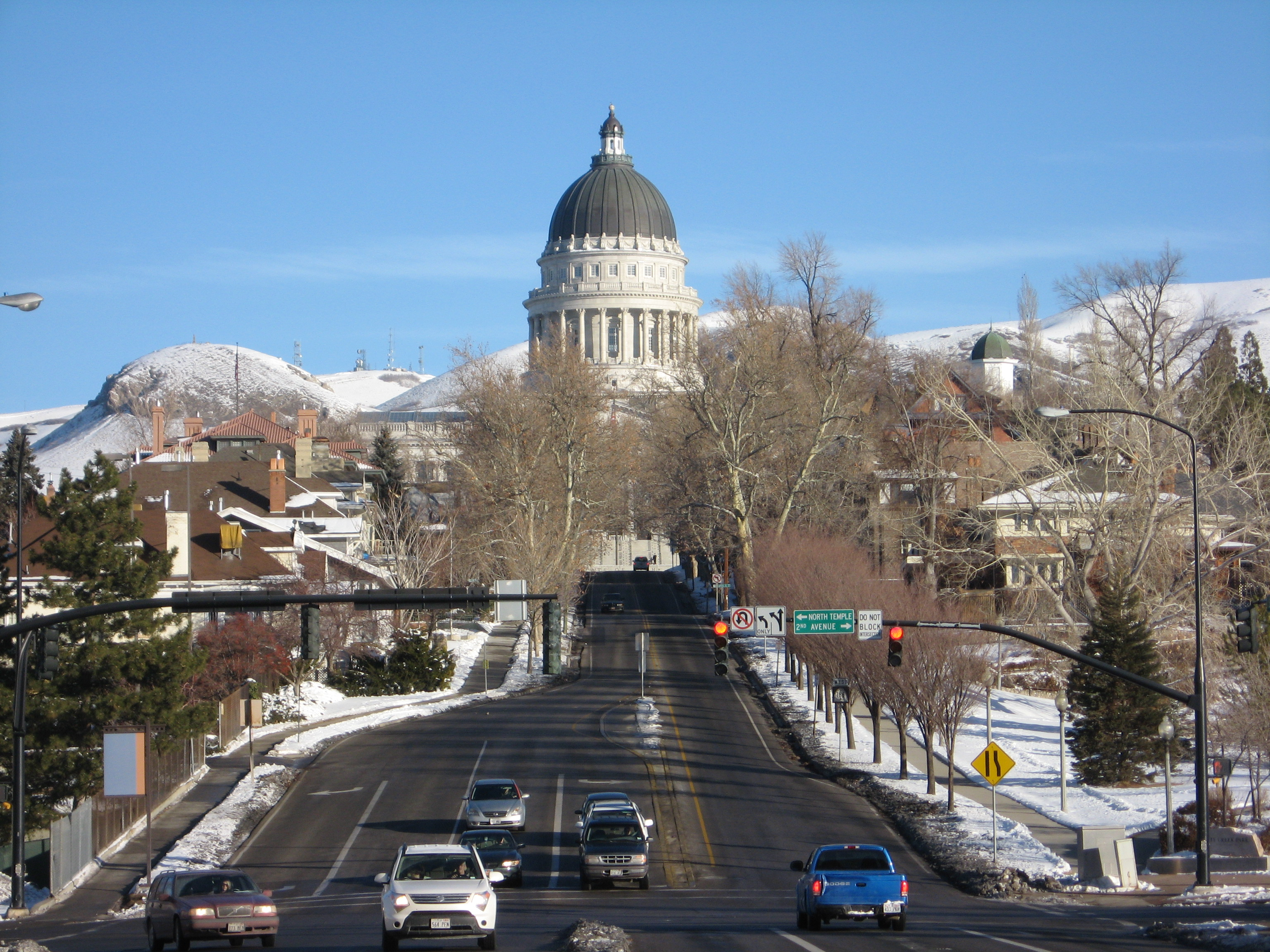
State Street approaching the Utah State Capitol; northbound US-89 turned left here until 2007

From Springville north to Salt Lake City, US-89 parallels—and for a distance overlaps—Interstate 15, following the old Arrowhead Trail, once the main highway from Salt Lake City to Los Angeles, through several downtowns. Numerous state highways connect US-89 to I-15, including SR-77 in Springville, SR-114 in Provo, SR-52 in Orem, SR-180 and SR-145 in American Fork, and SR-73 in Lehi. In Provo, US-89 meets US-189, its only branch, which heads northeast through Provo Canyon to Heber City, connecting to I-80 and bypassing Salt Lake City. North of Lehi, US-89 merges with I-15 (at exit 282), which has been built on or near the old road through a gap in the Traverse Mountains (elevation 4,800 feet; 1,500 m) into the Salt Lake Valley. The routes split in Draper, formerly with a direct interchange north of SR-71, but US-89 traffic must now exit at SR-71 (exit 291), turn east to Factory Outlet Drive, and follow this frontage road to the location of the former split. From here to downtown Salt Lake City, US-89 is marked along State Street, a major north–south street that ends at the Utah State Capitol. After passing through Sandy, Midvale, Murray, Millcreek Township, and South Salt Lake, State Street enters Salt Lake City at the intersection with SR-201 (2100 South).

Until 2007, US-89 followed State Street to North Temple (100 North), two blocks from the capitol, but now it turns at 400 South, following the former alignment of SR-186 and SR-176 west and north on 300 West, and rejoining its pre-2007 route at North Temple. In this area, modern US-89 runs for one block with the UTA TRAX Red Line in its median before crossing the TRAX line in Main Street's median, then passing the Frank E. Moss United States Courthouse, Pioneer Park, the historic Warehouse District at Pierpont Avenue, Japantown, Vivint Arena, the Arena TRAX station, the Triad Center, and West High School. As it leaves downtown, 300 West curves northwesterly and becomes Beck Street, meeting the modern terminus of SR-186 at Victory Road at the back side of Capitol Hill.

=== Northern Wasatch Front ===
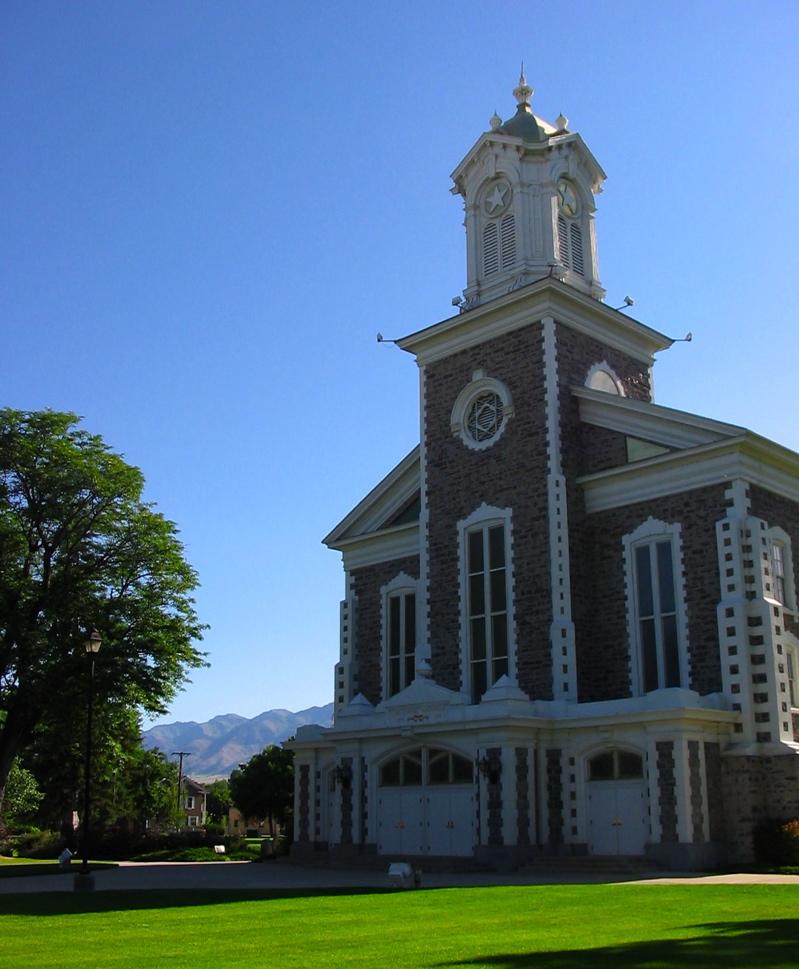
Route 89 passes by the Logan Tabernacle in downtown Logan, Cache County

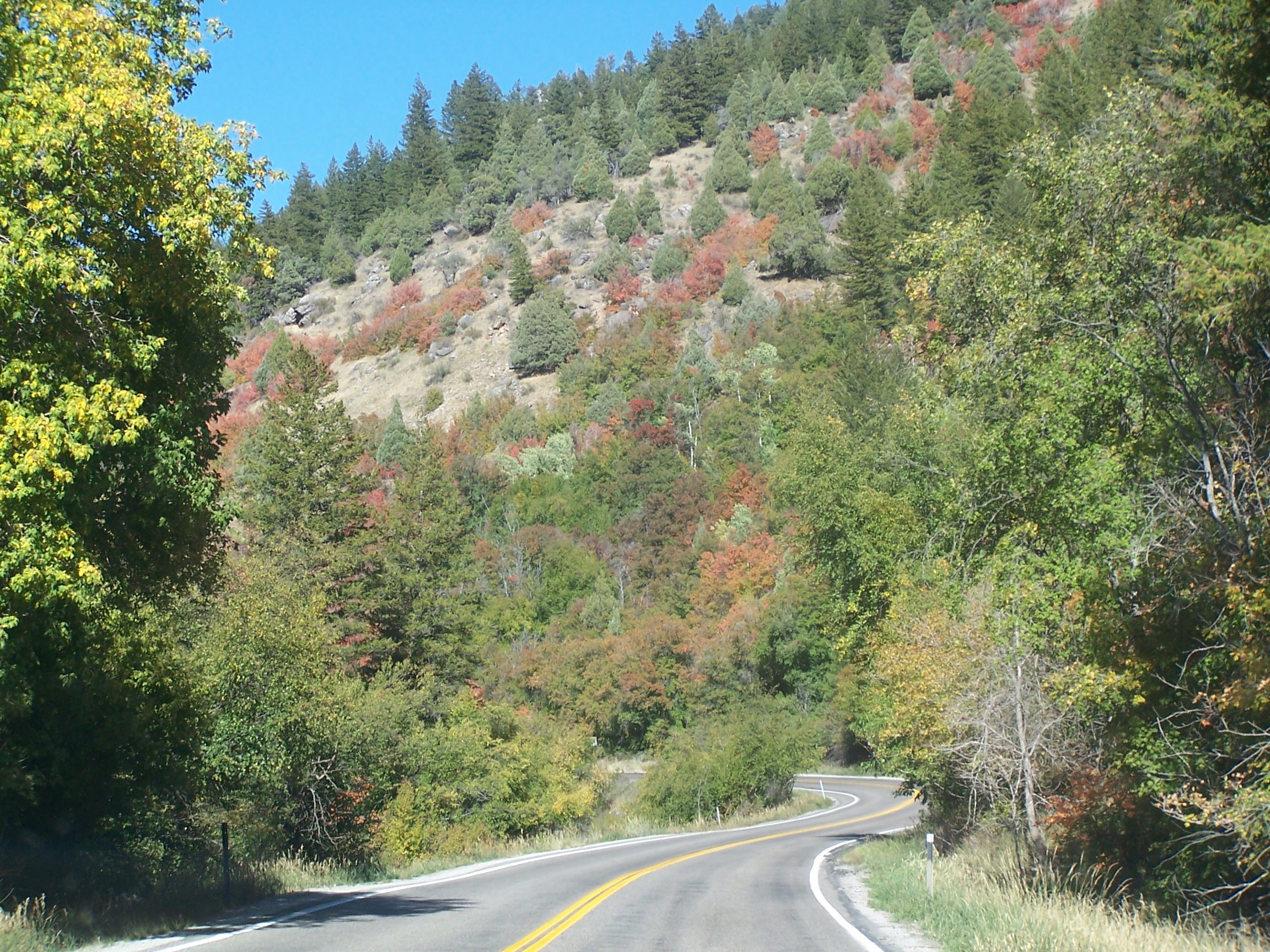
US-89 through Logan Canyon, a National Scenic Byway

US-89 leaves Salt Lake City at exit 312 of I-15, where it acts as I-15's frontage roads. Just south of I-15's junction with I-215, US-89 splits to the northeast, passing through Bountiful and Woods Cross. A northerly curve onto 500 West removes the highway from Bountiful's Main Street, and it merges with I-15 at exit 317 to bypass Centerville and Farmington, where the old road (former US-91, but never US-89) is SR-106, through the narrow strip of land that separates Farmington Bay from the Wasatch Mountains. US-89 leaves I-15 at exit 324, where the Legacy Parkway also ends, and proceeds north on a freeway. This portion of US-89 is the only one to include exit numbers based on its mileage, as opposed to the overlapping I-15 or I-70. The freeway ends after US-89 crosses SR-273, the former surface alignment of US-91 in both directions, and heads north as a four-lane road along the Wasatch foothills, to the east of Layton and Hill Air Force Base. This portion is planned to be upgraded to freeway status by 2023. After crossing I-84 in Uintah, US-89 enters Ogden, which it traverses via Washington Boulevard, rejoining old US-91 (now SR-26) south of downtown. Beyond Ogden, US-89 continues in a general northerly direction along the thin strip between Willard Bay and the Wasatch Mountains to Brigham City, where it finally turns east away from the I-15 corridor.

=== Wasatch Front to Idaho border ===
US-89 meets the current alignment of US-91 in the southern outskirts of Brigham City, turning east for an overlap on the city's southeast bypass. (SR-13 and SR-90 are the former alignment through Brigham City.) The two routes head east up Box Elder Canyon in the southern Wellsville Mountains, finally leaving the valley of the Great Salt Lake into a small valley that contains Mantua Reservoir (elevation 5,200 feet; 1,600 m). US-89/US-91 turns north there, bypassing the town of Mantua to the west, and continues to ascend through Dry Canyon to Sardine Summit (elevation 5,900 feet; 1,800 m). Another small valley leads to Wellsville Canyon, where the four-lane roadway again turns east and descends into the Cache Valley. In that valley, US-89/US-91 heads northeast, bypassing Wellsville to the east, into downtown Logan. US-91 continues northerly from Logan into Idaho, but US-89 splits to the east, beginning a long climb of the Bear River Range through Logan Canyon. The Logan Canyon Scenic Byway, a Utah and National Scenic Byway, begins at Logan and follows US-89 up the canyon, past the access road to the Beaver Mountain ski area, to Garden City and on to the state line. Bear Lake Summit (elevation 7,800 ft; 2,400 m), at the top of the range, is the highest point on US-89 in Utah, from which it descends the east slope via horseshoe curves to Garden City on the shore of Bear Lake (elevation 5,900 ft; 1,800 m). The final segment of US-89 to the Idaho state line follows the lake's west shore, its location constrained by the Bear River Range just to the west.

== History ==
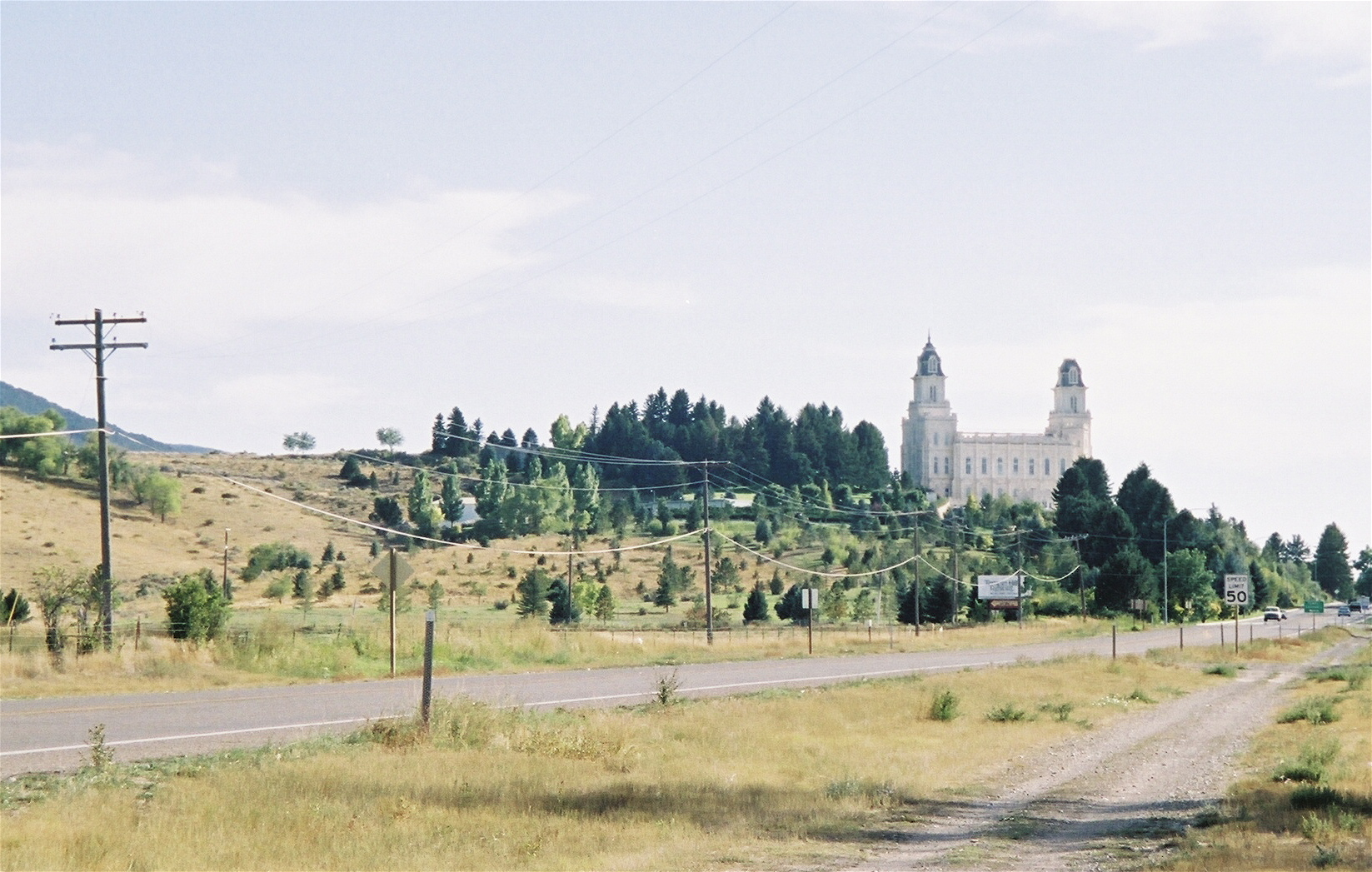
Manti Utah Temple along US-89 at the north edge of Manti.

When US-89 was created in 1926, it only went as far north as Springville, where travelers could continue to Salt Lake City via US-91. The highway was extended north to the Canada–US border near Glacier National Park in the mid-1930s, though a dispute between Utah and Idaho on the one side and Wyoming on the other was not settled until 1938. The American Association of State Highway Officials decided in favor of Utah and Idaho, placing US-89 on or near US-91 between Springville and Logan, where it split northeasterly to Yellowstone National Park. (US-89 only left US-91 twice: between Farmington and Ogden, where it still travels today, and via an all-weather route from Brigham City into the Cache Valley, now SR-38 and SR-30.) Wyoming's preferred routing, which left US-91 at Provo, instead became US-189. Beginning in the 1950s, Interstate 15 was constructed, replacing US-91 for through traffic south of Brigham City, and leading to that route's truncation there in 1974. On the other hand, US-89 follows independent corridors south of Spanish Fork and north of Logan. It has not been truncated and mostly follows US-91's final alignment, except between Farmington and Ogden (where old US-91 is now I-15, SR-126, and SR-26).

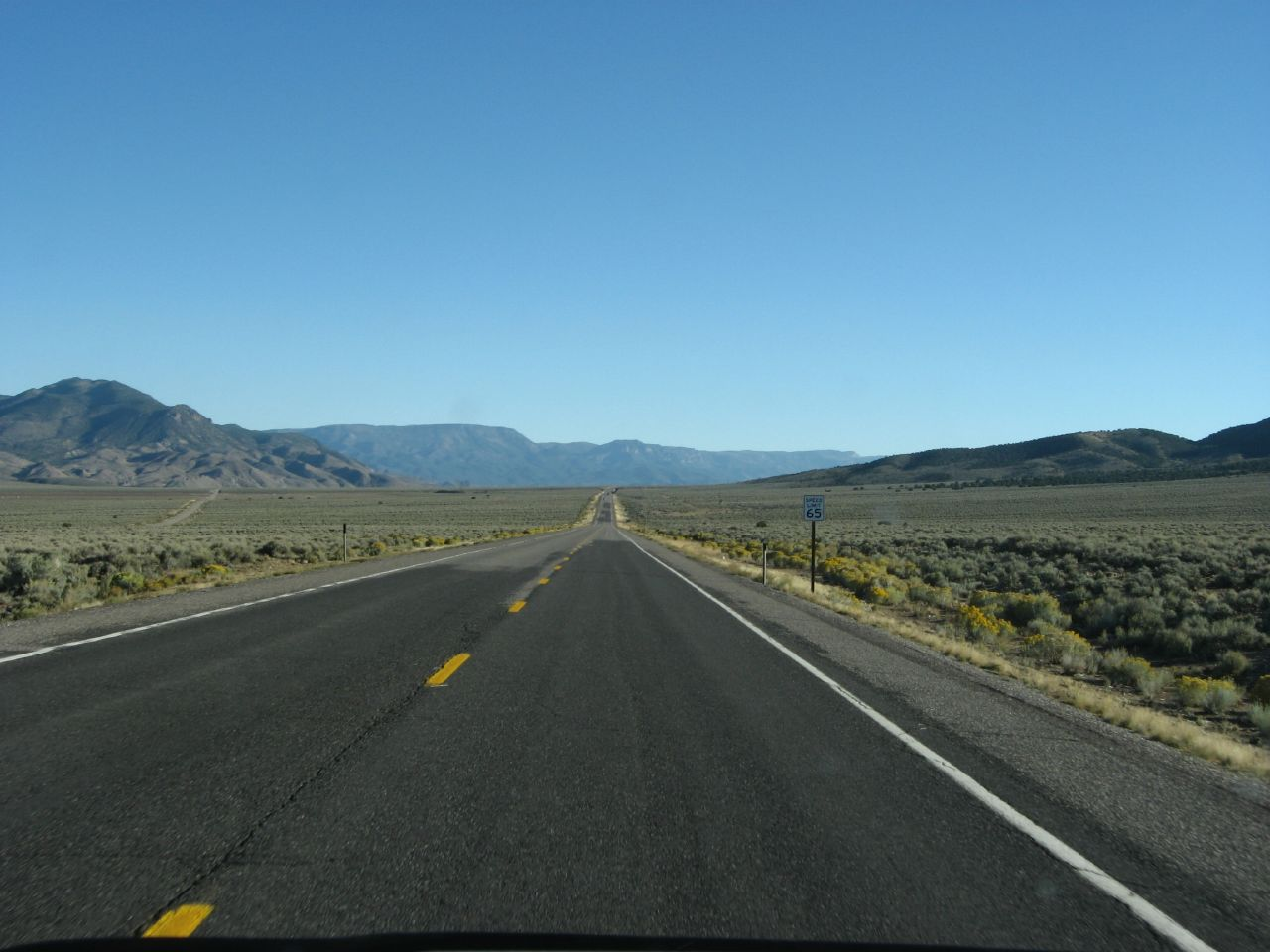
US-89 between Junction and Marysville

The southern part of US-89, running northerly from Kanab, mostly follows a succession of linear valleys. The Denver and Rio Grande Western Railroad opened a branch (later the Marysvale Branch) from its main line at Thistle to Manti in 1890, and extended it (through a subsidiary, the Sevier Railway), to Salina in 1891, Belknap in 1896, and Marysvale in 1900. No rail line ever reached farther south, and so residents of towns such as Junction, Panguitch, Alton, Glendale, and Kanab had to travel north to the railhead at Marysvale. The old county road through Circleville Canyon was poorly constructed, with steep grades and a rough surface. The State Road Commission designated the highway from Nephi east through Salt Creek Canyon and then south through these valleys to Kanab as a state road in or soon after 1910. Initially, the route from the summit at Long Valley Junction to Kanab went through Alton and Johnson Canyon, entering Kanab from the east. A more direct route via Long Valley was considered, serving the communities of Glendale, Orderville, and Mt. Carmel, but this would have required difficult construction over a mesa covered in loose sand to reach Kanab. In summer 1912, the commission added a branch from Long Valley Junction to Mt. Carmel, allowing these communities access to the state road system, along with a connection west from the junction to Cedar City. Several years later, in December 1915, the commission added the Mt. Carmel-Kanab road over the sand hills to the system and began construction of a sand-clay road in 1916. A connection from Pigeon Hollow Junction north to Thistle was also added in 1912, following the rail line through a canyon and providing another route to Salt Lake City.

In 1919, the state legislature redefined the state road system to include only a short list given in the law and any federal aid projects. The route from Kanab north was kept, including both approaches to Kanab and the two roads to Nephi and Thistle. In addition, a short extension from Kanab south to Arizona was added. An amendment in 1923 removed most of the original route through Johnson Canyon, but added a second route to Alton from the west, effectively forming a large triangular loop through that town. (The old route from Alton south to Kanab would be re-added to the state road system in 1933 as SR-136.) In the early 1920s, the State Road Commission assigned numbers to several major state roads; the route from Arizona northerly through Kanab and Richfield to Nephi became State Route 11. The numbers were officially adopted by the legislature in 1927, with both the main route and the loop through Alton being defined as SR-11; a new State Route 32 followed the branch to Thistle. The Alton loop was removed from SR-11 in 1941, with the south half remaining in the system as part of SR-136. Despite these designations, the majority of SR-11 and all of SR-32 were instead marked as US-89, with the remainder of SR-11 between Pigeon Hollow Junction and Nephi marked as US-189 from about 1930 until 1938.

State Route 1, which became U.S. Route 91 in 1926, ran north–south through central and northern Utah in the 1920s. State Route 2 left SR-1 at Logan and ran east through Logan Canyon to Garden City; this had been built with federal aid as a forest road in about 1918. The road north from Garden City to Idaho was added to the system in 1921, and became part of State Route 3. In 1927, the legislature added State Route 49, an alternate southern entrance to Ogden that left SR-1 at Farmington and merged with SR-5 (US-30S) at Uintah. (Present SR-60 was numbered as a branch of SR-49 until 1935.) State Route 69, stretching from US-191 (now SR-13) just north of Brigham City north and east to US-91 in Logan, became a state highway in 1931. The 1930s extension of US-89 took it north from Thistle along US-50 (SR-8) to Springville, US-91 (SR-1 and SR-106, later all SR-1) to Farmington, SR-49 to Uintah, US-30S (SR-5) to Ogden, US-91 (SR-1) to Brigham City, SR-69 to Logan, SR-2 to Garden City, and SR-3 to Idaho. US-89 was removed from SR-69 and overlapped with US-91 between Brigham City and Logan in the mid-1950s.

In 1957, one year after construction began on the Glen Canyon Dam, the legislature designated a new State Route 259, heading east and southeast from SR-11 in Kanab to Arizona en route to the dam and adjacent bridge. This replaced about eight miles (13 km) of SR-136 (the original state highway from the 1910s) at its south end, but the remainder was a new roadway, through an area not previously served by improved roads. The route passed the dam was initially designated as an alternate route of US-89, but when completed on 20 February 1959, it instead became US-89's mainline, as it was a better route during all weather, and the old route (SR-11 south of Kanab) became U.S. Route 89 Alternate.

Major numbering changes were made in Utah's state highway system in the 1960s and 1970s, beginning with the construction of Interstate Highways and culminating in the 1977 renumbering, where state route numbers concurrent with other types were dropped entirely. However, most of these changes were not visible to the public, as signs continued to display US-89 and other U.S. Routes and Interstates. The following changes were made to state routes related to US-89:

Route	Pre-1962	Changes	Post-1977
SR-1	Aligned with US-91 (not signed)	1962: moved to I-15 (no signage changes); specific changes are listed below	Became I-15
SR-259	Arizona to SR-11 (US-89A) in Kanab (signed as US-89)	no changes	Replaced by US-89
SR-11	Arizona to Nephi (mostly US-89; only signed north of Pigeon Hollow Junction)	1969: cut back to SR-4 (future I-70) at Sevier (SR-11 signs were replaced with SR-132 signs north of Pigeon Hollow Junction); specific changes are listed below	Arizona to Kanab
SR-258	Loop off US-89 through Central	1969: moved west to replace SR-11 (US-89) between Elsinore and SR-120 (signs were removed from the old route)	Remained as temporary US-89
SR-120	N/A	1969: created as a business loop for future I-70 through Richfield, replacing SR-11 (US-89) (no signage changes)	Remained as temporary US-89
SR-119	SR-11 (US-89) east to SR-24	1969: extended southwest over SR-11 (US-89) to SR-120 (no signage changes)	SR-120 east to SR-24
SR-135	N/A	1969: replaced SR-11 (US-89) between SR-119 and SR-24 (no signage changes)	Remained as temporary US-89
SR-24	SR-11 (US-89) southeast and northeast to I-70	1969: extended north over SR-11 (US-89) to SR-28 in Salina (no signage changes)	US-50 near Salina southeast and northeast to I-70
SR-28	SR-11 in Gunnison north to Levan	1969: extended south over SR-11 (US-89) and proposed connection to I-70 (no signage changes)	US-89 in Gunnison north to Levan (1969 extension replaced by US-89)
SR-32	SR-11 (US-89) at Pigeon Hollow Junction north to Thistle (signed as US-89)	1969: extended south over SR-11 (US-89) to SR-28 in Gunnison (no signage changes)	Replaced by US-89
SR-132	Lynndyl to Nephi	1969: extended southeast over SR-11 to SR-32 (US-89) at Pigeon Hollow Junction (signs changed from SR-11 to SR-132 on extension)	Lynndyl to US-89 at Pigeon Hollow Junction
SR-8	Colorado to SR-1 (US-91) in Springville (signed as US-6, US-50, and US-89)	1962: replaced by SR-4 (I-70) near the Colorado state line (no signage changes); 1964: replaced SR-1 (US-89/91) between Springville and Lehi (no signage changes); 1969: became SR-27 south of Moark Junction (no signage changes), leaving only Moark Junction to Lehi	Replaced by US-89
SR-271	N/A	1964: replaced SR-1 (US-89/91) through Salt Lake City, from Draper to Becks (no signage changes)	Replaced by US-89
SR-169	N/A	1962: replaced SR-1 (US-89/91) from Becks to north Bountiful (no signage changes)	Replaced by US-89
SR-49	SR-1 north to SR-3 (I-80N) near Uintah (signed as US-89)	1968: replaced SR-3 from Uintah to Ogden (no signage changes)	Replaced by US-89
SR-50	N/A	1969: replaced SR-1 (US-89/91) from Roy through Ogden to Hot Springs Junction (no signage changes)	Replaced by US-89 north of Ogden; Roy to Ogden (ex-US-91) became SR-26
SR-84	SR-1 in Roy to SR-1 at Hot Springs Junction	1962: replaced SR-1 (US-89/91, US-191) from Hot Springs Junction to Riverside (no signage changes); 1969: replaced SR-1 (US-91) from Layton to Roy (no signage changes)	Replaced by US-89 from Hot Springs Junction to Brigham City; Layton to Hot Springs Junction became SR-126 and Brigham City to Riverside became SR-13
SR-85	N/A	1962: replaced SR-1 (US-89/91) from Brigham City to Idaho (no signage changes)	Replaced by US-91 (partly concurrent with US-89)
SR-13	N/A	1962: replaced SR-2 (US-89) from Logan to Garden City (no signage changes)	Replaced by US-89
SR-16	N/A	1962: replaced SR-3 (partly US-89) from Wyoming to Idaho (signage south of Garden City changed from SR-3 to SR-16)	Wyoming to SR-30 at Sage Creek Junction (replaced by SR-30 and US-89 north of Sage Creek Junction)

In particular, SR-11 was cut back to only the roadway south from Kanab, which had become US-89A in 1959.

== Major intersections ==
County	Location	mi	km	Exit	Destinations	Notes
Kane		0.000	0.000		US 89 south – Page	Continuation into Arizona
Kane	Kanab	63.832	102.728		US 89A south (100 E south) – Fredonia, Jacob Lake, Grand Canyon	Former SR-11
Kane	Mount Carmel Junction	81.211	130.696		SR-9 west – Zion National Park, Hurricane	
Kane	Long Valley Junction	103.684	166.863		SR-14 west – Duck Creek, Cedar City	
Garfield	Bryce Canyon Junction	124.227	199.924		SR-12 east – Bryce Canyon National Park, Tropic	
Garfield	Panguitch	131.088	210.966		SR-143 (Main Street)	
Garfield	Bear Valley Junction	141.104	227.085		SR-20	
Piute		162.382	261.328		SR-62	
Piute	Junction	164.282	264.386		SR-153 (Center Street)	
Sevier		191.740	308.576		I-70 west to I-15	South end of I-70 overlap; I-70 exit 23
Sevier	Joseph	194	312	25	SR-118 – Joseph, Monroe	Exit numbers follow I-70
Sevier	Elsinore	200	320	31	Elsinore, Monroe (SR-258)	Exit numbers follow I-70
Sevier	Richfield	206	332	37	I-70 BL east (SR-120 east) – Richfield	Exit numbers follow I-70
Sevier	Richfield	209	336	40	I-70 BL west (SR-120 west) – Richfield	Exit numbers follow I-70
Sevier	Sigurd	217	349	48	SR-259 to SR-24 – Sigurd, Aurora	Exit numbers follow I-70
Sevier	Salina	225.362	362.685		I-70 BS begins / I-70 east / US 50 east – Green River	North end of I-70 overlap; I-70 exit 56; south end of US-50/I-70 Bus. overlap
Sevier	Salina	227.117	365.509		I-70 BS ends (Main Street) / US 50 west to SR-24 – Delta	North end of US-50/I-70 Bus. overlap
Sevier		228.225	367.293		SR-256 north – Redmond	Southern terminus of SR-256
Sanpete		233.460	375.717		SR-256 south – Redmond	Northern terminus of SR-256
Sanpete	Gunnison	240.195	386.556		SR-137 (600 South)	
Sanpete	Gunnison	241.434	388.550		SR-28 (Main Street)	
Sanpete		247.806	398.805		SR-137	
Sanpete	Ephraim	262.668	422.723		SR-290 (Center Street)	
Sanpete	Ephraim	262.794	422.926		SR-290 (100 North)	
Sanpete	Pigeon Hollow Junction	267.346	430.252		SR-132	
Sanpete		271.892	437.568		SR-117 – Chester, Spring City, Wales	
Sanpete		276.346	444.736		SR-117 south – Spring City	Northern terminus of SR-117
Sanpete	Mount Pleasant	277.868	447.185		SR-116 (Main Street)	
Sanpete	Fairview	284.015	457.078		SR-231 north (State Street) to SR-31 east	
Sanpete	Fairview	284.131	457.265		SR-31 (400 North)	
Utah		312.784	503.377		US 6 east – Price	South end of US-6 overlap
Utah	Moark Junction	322.276	518.653		US 6 west to I-15 – Provo, Salt Lake, Spanish Fork	North end of US-6 overlap
Utah	Mapleton	324.711	522.572		SR-147 (1600 South)	
Utah	Mapleton	325.719	524.194		SR-147 (Maple Street) – Mapleton City Center	
Utah	Springville	327.694	527.372		SR-51 – Spanish Fork	Interchange; southbound left exit and northbound left entrance
Utah	Springville	328.068	527.974		SR-77 (400 South) to I-15	
Utah	Springville	329.778	530.726		SR-75 (1400 North) to I-15	
Utah	Provo	334.108	537.695		US 189 (University Avenue) to I-15	
Utah	Provo	334.855	538.897		SR-114 (Center Street) to I-15	
Utah	Orem	337.878	543.762		SR-265 (University Parkway) to I-15	
Utah	Orem	340.707	548.315		SR-52 (800 North) to I-15	
Utah	Lindon–Pleasant Grove line	343.976	553.576		SR-129 (800 North)	
Utah	Pleasant Grove	344.676	554.702		SR-114 (Main Street)	
Utah	Pleasant Grove	345.436	555.925		Pleasant Grove Boulevard to I-15	
Utah	Pleasant Grove–American Fork line	346.455	557.565		SR-129 (North County Boulevard)	
Utah	American Fork	347.360	559.022		SR-180 (500 East) to I-15	
Utah	American Fork	347.971	560.005		SR-74 (100 East)	
Utah	American Fork	348.811	561.357		SR-145 west (Main Street west) to I-15	
Utah	Lehi	350.056	563.361		SR-73 (Main Street) to I-15	
Utah	Lehi				SR-85 west	Future interchange
Utah	Lehi	352.996	568.092		I-15 south – Provo	South end of I-15 overlap; I-15 exit 282
Utah	Lehi	355	571	284	SR-92 – Highland, Alpine	Exit numbers follow I-15
Salt Lake	Draper	359	578	288	SR-140 (14600 South)	Exit numbers follow I-15
Salt Lake	Draper	361	581	289	SR-154 (Bangerter Highway)	Exit numbers follow I-15
Salt Lake	Draper	362	583		I-15 north / SR-71 west (12300 S west) – Salt Lake, Riverton	North end of I-15 overlap; I-15 exit 291; south end of SR-71 overlap
Salt Lake	Draper	362.150	582.824		SR-71 east (12300 S east) – Draper	North end of SR-71 overlap
Salt Lake	Sandy–Draper line	363.407	584.847		SR-175 (11400 South)	
Salt Lake	Sandy	366.464	589.767		SR-209 (9000 South)	
Salt Lake	Midvale	368.750	593.446		SR-48 (7200 South)	
Salt Lake	Murray	369.493	594.641		I-215 east	Interchange; I-215 exit 11
Salt Lake	Murray				Winchester Street to I-215 west	I-215 exit 10
Salt Lake	Murray	371.216	597.414		SR-173 (5300 South)	
Salt Lake	Murray	372.491	599.466		SR-266 (4500 South)	
Salt Lake	South Salt Lake	374.270	602.329		SR-171 (3300 South)	
Salt Lake	South Salt Lake	375.559	604.404		I-80	Interchange; I-80 exit 124
Salt Lake	South Salt Lake–Salt Lake City line	376.062	605.213		SR-201 (2100 South)	
Salt Lake	Salt Lake City	378.330	608.863		600 South (SR-269 east)	One-way pair
Salt Lake	Salt Lake City	378.480	609.105		SR-269 west (500 South) to I-15 / I-80	One-way pair
Salt Lake	Salt Lake City	378.552	609.220		SR-186	SR-186 west is former US-89 north
Salt Lake	Salt Lake City	378.852	609.703		SR-270 south (West Temple) to I-15 / I-80	
Salt Lake	Salt Lake City	379.145	610.175		300 W south to I-15 south / I-80	
Salt Lake	Salt Lake City	379.145	610.175		400 S west to I-15 north	
Salt Lake	Salt Lake City	380.641	612.582		SR-268 west (600 North) to I-15	
Salt Lake	Salt Lake City	381.495	613.957		SR-186 east (Victory Road) – Pioneer Memorial Museum	Western terminus of SR-186
Salt Lake	Salt Lake City	383	616		I-15 north – Ogden	Northbound exit and southbound entrance; I-15 exit 312
Davis	North Salt Lake	384	618		I-15 south	Southbound exit and northbound entrance; I-15 exit 312
Davis	North Salt Lake–Bountiful– Woods Cross tripoint	386.801	622.496		SR-93 west (2600 South) to I-15	Eastern terminus of SR-93
Davis	Bountiful–Woods Cross line	387.379	623.426		SR-68 north	Interchange; northbound exit and southbound entrance; southern terminus of SR-68
Davis	Bountiful	388.438	625.130		SR-68 (500 South)	
Davis	Bountiful–West Bountiful line	389.123	626.233		SR-106 (400 North) to I-15 south	
Davis	Bountiful–West Bountiful line	389.531	626.889	—	I-15 south	South end of freeway section; south end of I-15 overlap; southbound exit and northbound left entrance; I-15 exit 317
Davis	Centerville	391	629	319	SR-105 (Parrish Lane) – Centerville	Exit numbers follow I-15
Davis	Farmington	393	632	321	SR-177 (West Davis Corridor)	Northbound exit and southbound entrance; southern terminus of SR-177
Davis	Farmington	394	634	322	SR-227 (200 West) / Lagoon Drive – Farmington	Northbound exit and southbound entrance
Davis	Farmington	395.586	636.634	—	I-15 north – Ogden	North end of I-15 overlap; left exit and entrance; I-15 exit 324; exit numbers follow US-89; southbound access is via exit 395
Davis	Farmington	395.586	636.634	394	SR-67 south (Legacy Parkway)	Southbound left exit and northbound left entrance; SR-67 exit 11
Davis	Farmington	396.051	637.382	395	SR-225 (Park Lane) to I-15 north – Farmington	No northbound entrance
Davis	Farmington	396.746	638.501	396	SR-106 (Shepard Lane)	No southbound entrance
Davis	Farmington–Fruit Heights line	397.549	639.793	397	SR-273 (Main Street) – Farmington, Kaysville	
Davis	Fruit Heights	399.705	643.263	399	400 North	
Davis	Layton	401.411	646.008	401	SR-109 west (Oak Hills Drive)	
Davis	Layton			402	Gordon Avenue	
Davis	Layton	403.221	648.921	403	Antelope Drive	Opened November 1, 2022
Davis	Layton	404.296	650.651	404	SR-193 west – Hill AFB, Clearfield	
Davis	South Weber	405.729	652.958	405	SR-60 (South Weber Drive)	Former SR-49A
Weber River		406.346	653.950	North end of freeway		
Weber	Uintah	406.434	654.092		I-84 – Morgan, Riverdale, Cheyenne	Interchange; I-84 exit 87
Weber	South Ogden	408.379	657.222		SR-203 (Harrison Boulevard)	
Weber	South Ogden–Washington Terrace line	410.256	660.243		Adams Avenue Parkway	
Weber	Ogden	412.365	663.637		SR-26 (Riverdale Road)	Former US-91
Weber	Ogden	413.052	664.743		SR-79 (30th Street)	
Weber	Ogden	413.927	666.151		SR-53 (24th Street)	
Weber	Ogden	415.425	668.562		SR-39 (12th Street)	
Weber	Ogden	416.463	670.232		SR-235 (Washington Boulevard north) / 2nd Street	
Weber	Harrisville	417.408	671.753		SR-204 (Wall Avenue)	
Weber	Pleasant View	420.292	676.394		SR-134 (2700 North)	
Box Elder	Hot Springs Junction	423.300	681.235		SR-126 to I-15 / I-84 – Salt Lake	Interchange; left exits and entrances
Box Elder	Willard	428.771	690.040		SR-315 (750 North) to I-15 / I-84	
Box Elder	Brigham City	433.555	697.739		US 91 south (1100 South) / SR-13 (Main Street)	South end of US-91 overlap; southern terminus of SR-13
Box Elder	Brigham City	435	700		SR-90 – Brigham City	Interchange; southbound exit and northbound entrance
Box Elder	Mantua	437	703		Mantua	Interchange; northbound exit and southbound entrance; former SR-251
Cache	Wellsville	449	723		SR-23 (Center Street)	
Cache	Wellsville	451	726		SR-101 (Main Street)	
Cache	Logan	455	732		SR-252 (1000 West)	
Cache	Logan	457	735		SR-165 (Main Street)	
Cache	Logan	458	737		SR-30 west (200 North)	South end of SR-30 overlap
Cache	Logan	458.970	738.641		US 91 north (Main Street)	North end of US-91 overlap
Cache		487.023	783.788		SR-243	
Rich	Garden City	498.512	802.277		SR-30 east (Bear Lake Boulevard)	North end of SR-30 overlap
Rich		502.577	808.819		US 89 north – Montpelier	Continuation into Idaho
1.000 mi = 1.609 km; 1.000 km = 0.621 mi: Concurrency terminus; Incomplete access

U.S. Route 89
Previous state: Arizona	Utah	Next state: Idaho
