= Utah State Route 225 =

Highway in Utah

State Route 225
- Park Lane
- SR-225 highlighted in red

Route information
- Maintained by UDOT
- Length: 0.745 mi (1,199 m)
- Existed: 1964–present

Major junctions
- West end: I-15 / SR-67 in Farmington
- US 89 in Farmington
- East end: SR-106 in Farmington

Location
- Country: United States
- State: Utah

Highway system
- Utah State Highway System; Interstate; US; State; Minor; Scenic
← SR-224	→ SR-226

State Route 225 (SR-225) is a state highway in the U.S. state of Utah that spans 0.745 miles (1.199 km) in Farmington, Davis County. The route connects I-15 to US-89 and SR-106 as it passes through the center of Farmington on Park Lane. The highway was formed in 1964, initially having its west end at US-89 and I-15 before the terminus moved further west to Clark Lane in 2005, only to be truncated back to the railroad bridge in 2011. The eastern terminus has always remained at SR-106.

== Route description ==
The route officially begins at the west side of the bridge over the Union Pacific Railroad and FrontRunner, proceeding northeast on Park Lane. After about 400 feet (120 m), the route intersects I-15 at exit 325. This interchange does not have direct access from northbound I-15 or to southbound I-15; instead, there is an exit (13) from northbound Legacy Parkway to SR-225, as well as an on-ramp from SR-225 to southbound Legacy Parkway. Immediately after this interchange, SR-225 comes to another interchange, this time with the US-89 freeway, which includes access to southbound I-15 and from northbound I-15. Past this intersection, the route heads due east before intersecting an access road to Lagoon Amusement Park and terminating at SR-106.

== History ==
State Route 225 was established in 1964, initially going from US-89 east on Burke Lane (which today is Park Lane) to SR-106. In 1967, the western terminus was moved to I-15 when the freeway was constructed through the area. In 2005, the route was extended southwest to Clark Lane. However, in 2011, the western terminus was truncated back to the bridge over the railroad tracks; the part west of there was given to the city of Farmington.

== Major intersections ==
The entire route is in Farmington, Davis County.

mi	km	Destinations	Notes
0.000	0.000	Union Pacific and FrontRunner bridge	Western terminus
0.048– 0.136	0.077– 0.219	I-15 north / SR-67 south (Legacy Parkway) – Ogden, Salt Lake City	Interchange
0.237– 0.325	0.381– 0.523	US 89 to I-15 south – Salt Lake City	Interchange
0.745	1.199	SR-106 (Main Street)	Eastern terminus
1.000 mi = 1.609 km; 1.000 km = 0.621 mi
