= Mantua, Utah =

Town in the state of Utah, United States

- Town
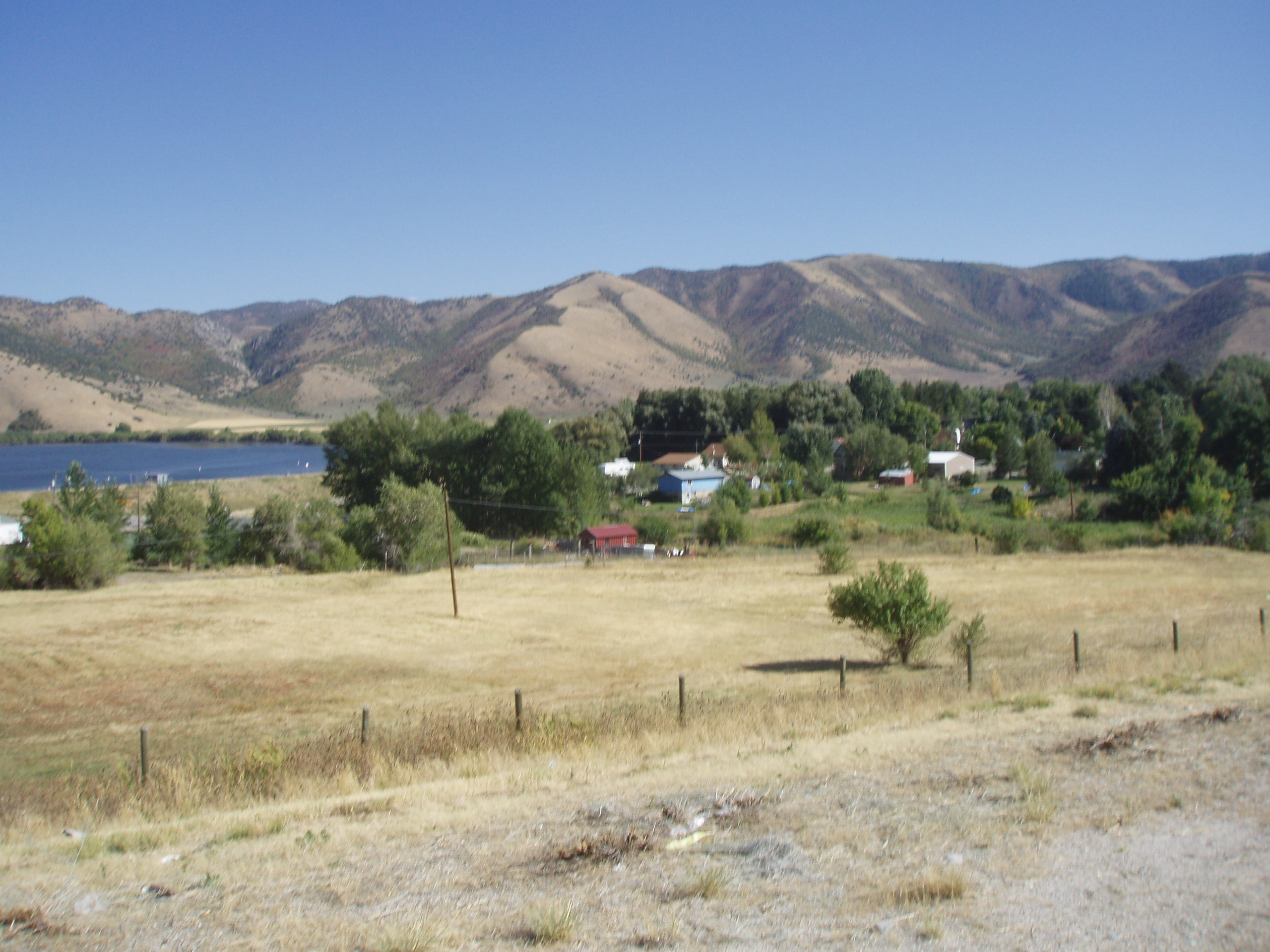
- Mantua, as seen from US-89/US-91, September 2008

- Location of Mantua within Box Elder County and within the State of Utah

- Location of Utah within the United States
- Coordinates: 41°29′51″N 111°56′05″W
- Country: United States
- State: Utah
- County: Box Elder
- Settled: 1863
- Incorporated: 1911
- Named for: Mantua, Ohio

Government
  - Type: Mayor/Council
  - Mayor: Terry Nelson

Area
  - Total: 5.70 sq mi (14.8 km^{2})
  - Land: 4.91 sq mi (12.7 km^{2})
  - Water: 0.79 sq mi (2.0 km^{2})
- Elevation: 5,164 ft (1,574 m)

Population (2020)
  - Total: 1,090
  - Density: 196.25/sq mi (75.77/km^{2})
- Time zone: UTC-7 (Mountain Time Zone)
  - Summer (DST): UTC-6 (MDT)
- ZIP code: 84324
- Area code: 435
- FIPS code: 49-47840
- GNIS feature ID: 2412947
- Website: www.mantuautah.gov

Mantua (/ˈmæn.(t)ə.weɪ/, MAN-(t)ə-way) is a town on the eastern edge of Box Elder County, Utah, United States. The population of the town was 1,090 at the 2020 census.

== History ==
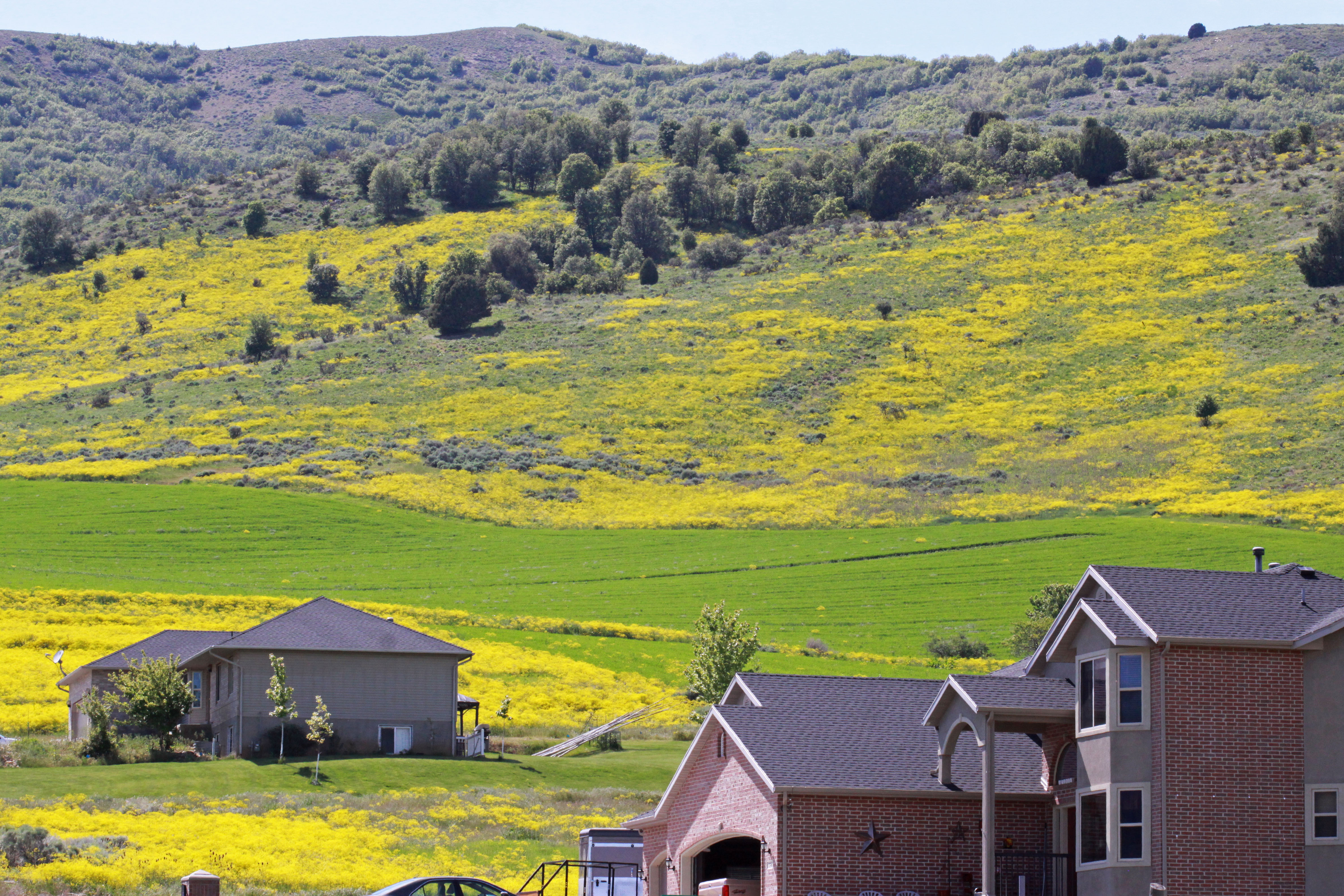
Spring in the foothills on the west side of Mantua, May 2015

Mantua was settled in the mid-19th century when members of the Church of Jesus Christ of Latter-day Saints were sent by Lorenzo Snow to the valley to grow flax. The first group arrived in Mantua in 1863 (although a sign at the main entry route states "Founded 1864"), and were all émigrés from Denmark led by Hans Jens Jensen. Snow was from Mantua, Ohio, and the town was named after the Ohio community in his honor. Due to Danish pronunciation the town's pronunciation was changed to "man-away" unlike Ohio's ("man-tooway"). Prior to receiving its current name, the community was called Box Elder Valley, Copenhagen, Flaxville, Geneva, Hunsaker Valley, Little Copenhagen, and Little Valley.

== Geography ==
Mantua lies at the head of Box Elder Canyon on the northern, western, and southern sides of the Mantua Reservoir. According to the United States Census Bureau, the town has a total area of 5.6 square miles (15 km^{2}), of which 4.9 square miles (13 km^{2}) are land and 0.7 square miles (1.8 km^{2}) (13.21%) is water.

=== Climate ===
According to the Köppen Climate Classification system, Mantua has a dry summer continental climate, abbreviated "Dsa" on climate maps.

Historical population
| Census | Pop. | Note | %± |
|---|---|---|---|
| 1870 | 184 | | — |
| 1880 | 356 | | 93.5% |
| 1890 | 337 | | −5.3% |
| 1900 | 350 | | 3.9% |
| 1910 | 377 | | 7.7% |
| 1920 | 354 | | −6.1% |
| 1930 | 314 | | −11.3% |
| 1940 | 319 | | 1.6% |
| 1950 | 271 | | −15.0% |
| 1960 | 275 | | 1.5% |
| 1970 | 413 | | 50.2% |
| 1980 | 484 | | 17.2% |
| 1990 | 665 | | 37.4% |
| 2000 | 791 | | 18.9% |
| 2010 | 687 | | −13.1% |
| 2019 (est.) | 963 | | 40.2% |
US Decennial Census

== Demographics ==
As of the 2000 United States census, there were 791 people, 218 households, and 189 families in the town. The population density was 162.5 people per square mile (62.7/km^{2}). There were 231 housing units at an average density of 47.5 per square mile (18.3/km^{2}). The racial makeup of the town was 96.33% White, 0.63% African American, 0.51% Native American, 0.25% Asian, 0.51% from other races, and 1.77% from two or more races. Hispanic or Latino of any race were 0.88% of the population.

There were 218 households, out of which 52.8% had children under the age of 18 living with them, 79.4% were married couples living together, 5.0% had a female householder with no husband present, and 13.3% were non-families. 12.4% of all households were made up of individuals, and 5.5% had someone living alone who was 65 years of age or older. The average household size was 3.63 and the average family size was 4.01.

The town population contained 38.2% under the age of 18, 10.1% from 18 to 24, 23.3% from 25 to 44, 20.1% from 45 to 64, and 8.3% who were 65 years of age or older. The median age was 30 years. For every 100 females, there were 108.7 males. For every 100 females age 18 and over, there were 103.8 males.

The median income for a household in the town was $60,234, and the median income for a family was $61,964. Males had a median income of $42,100 versus $26,875 for females. The per capita income for the town was $17,798. About 0.5% of families and 1.7% of the population were below the poverty line, including 2.1% of those under age 18 and 3.4% of those age 65 or over.

== Mantua Reservoir ==
There are several natural springs in the valley that feed into the reservoir. At the south end of the valley is Maple Spring. Its water flows northward into the reservoir via Maple Creek. At the west base of the Little Knoll on the east side of the reservoir is a spring that is pumped into the lake. Further north is another spring flowing from the east mountain. North of town at the base of Round Hill is the north spring that runs south. On the west of town is Halling Springs which runs south east into the northern end of the reservoir. Brigham City as of 2020 diverts most of this water into culverts for fresh drinking water, leaving barely enough water in the creek to water livestock on its way to the reservoir. In 1959–60, Brigham City (located at the mouth of Box Elder Canyon) obtained land at the center of the valley, and raised an earthen dam on Big Creek and a dike around most of the perimeter to create Mantua Reservoir – also known as Brigham City Reservoir. Brigham City continues to own the reservoir and adjoining land, and operates the reservoir. The reservoir is open to public access, including ice fishing during cold seasons.

== Government ==
Mantua is considered to be a speed trap. In 1997, its two police officers issued over 1,300 speeding tickets, amounting to fines of approximately $60,000, or more than half of the city's total yearly revenue. In 2014, it issued over 2,100 traffic tickets, amounting to approximately $220,000 in fines, or more than one-third of total yearly revenue. The sole full-time police officer (and later mayor) objected to the term "speed trap" as he said he did not hide his truck, and fatal accidents had decreased since he began patrolling. Most tickets are issued along the town's section of combined US Highway 89/91. However, a state legislator countered that reduced speed limits, installed barriers, and rumble strips have reduced traffic fatalities, calling into question the justification for such a large ratio (compared to number of residents) of issued traffic tickets in the area.

In January 2020, Mantua again came under fire for unethical revenue sources, as they were issuing parking tickets on land not owned by the city, and with signage knowingly being installed wrong. They had also increased their budget for parking fines 24% over the previous year. When asked about this, the city claimed that it loses money on parking tickets which is in contrast to the rest of the state. Brigham City owns the land which the tickets were written on, and the Mantua Police Department was operating with unapproved Brigham City employees telling them when to issue citations.

In 2021, the town prosecutor filed Class C misdemeanor charges against about a dozen residents for failing to license their dogs even though the dogs had died. The police chief had signed the summons in which he stated that there was evidence of the violation, but was unable to produce it for the trial. The town council subsequently changed the ordinance to make failure to obtain a dog license an infraction rather than a criminal misdemeanor, bringing the town into compliance with Utah state law, which permits a misdemeanor only for repeated offenses or in situations that are a threat to public health or safety.

== See also ==
- List of cities and towns in Utah
