= List of highways numbered 224 =

The following highways are numbered 224:

== Canada ==
- Manitoba Provincial Road 224
- Nova Scotia Route 224
- Prince Edward Island Route 224
- Quebec Route 224
- Saskatchewan Highway 224

== China ==
- China National Highway 224

== Costa Rica ==
- National Route 224

== Japan ==
- Japan National Route 224

== United Kingdom ==
- B224 road
- A224 road

== United States ==
- U.S. Route 224
- Arkansas Highway 224
- California State Route 224 (former)
- Colorado State Highway 224
- Florida State Road 224
- Georgia State Route 224
- Iowa Highway 224
- K-224 (Kansas highway)
- Kentucky Route 224
- Maine State Route 224
- Maryland Route 224
- Minnesota State Highway 224 (former)
- Missouri Route 224
- Montana Secondary Highway 224
- Nevada State Route 224 (former)
- New Mexico State Road 224
- New York State Route 224
- Oregon Route 224
- Pennsylvania Route 224 (former)
- South Dakota Highway 224
- Tennessee State Route 224
- Texas State Highway 224
  - Texas State Highway Spur 224
- Utah State Route 224
- Virginia State Route 224
- Washington State Route 224
- Wyoming Highway 224

| Preceded by 223 | Lists of highways 224 | Succeeded by 225 |
