= Box Elder Canyon (Box Elder County, Utah) =

Canyon in Box Elder County, Utah, United States

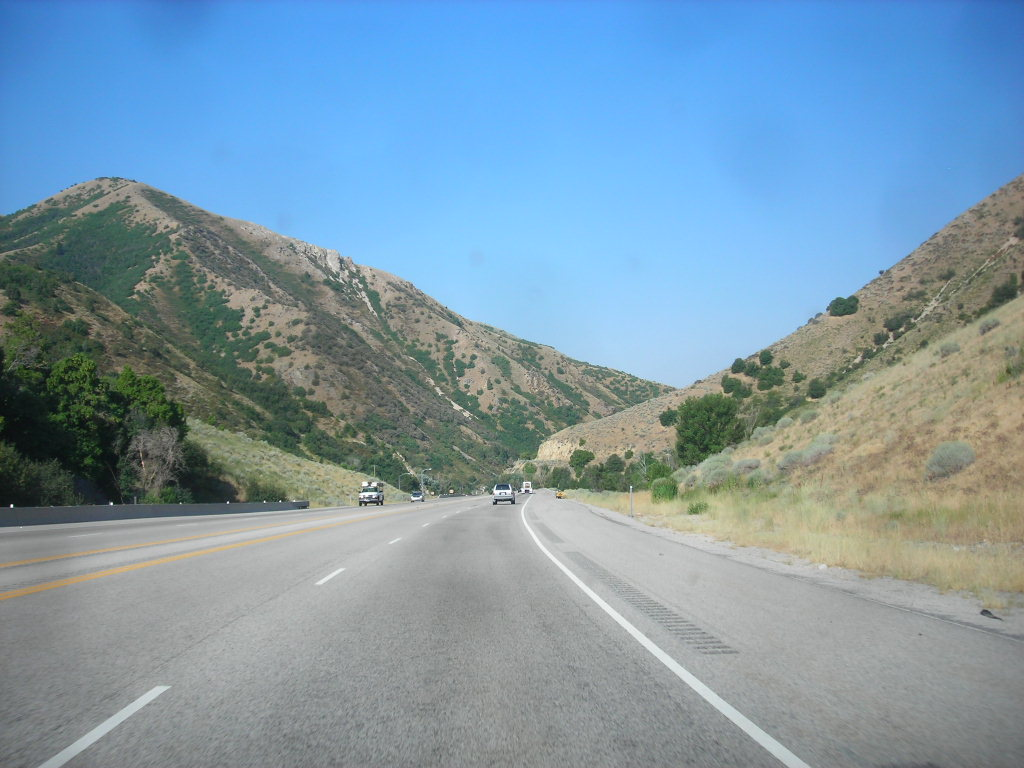
- Traveling southerly (west) along US 89 / US 91 heading down the canyon from the top (immediately west of Mantua), July 2007

- Location within Utah Location within the United States
- Elevation: 5,525 feet (1,684 m)

Third Approach
- Location: Box Elder County
- Range: Wasatch Mountains
- Coordinates: 41.4994°N 111.9944°W

Box Elder Canyon is a canyon located within the western slopes of the Wellsville Mountains, a branch of the Wasatch Range of the Rocky Mountains in Box Elder County, Utah, United States. Box Elder Canyon and Wellsville Canyon together provide the routes of U.S. Route 89 / U.S. Route 91 (US 89 / US 91) across the Wellsville Mountains. Both of these canyons are sometimes locally referred to as Sardine Canyon, although the actual Sardine Canyon is used by an old alignment of the highway along the eastern slope of the Wellsville Mountains.

== Description ==
The valley was created by a prehistoric river, which flowed as a tributary into the main pool of ancient Lake Bonneville, emerging east of present-day Brigham City. The western or lower mouth of Box Elder Canyon is located approximately 56 miles (90 km) north of Salt Lake City, Utah, via Interstate 15 and US 91. The joint routes of US 89 / US 91 join together at 1100 South Main Street to the west and enter Box Elder Canyon 2 miles (3.2 km) east of downtown Brigham City.

In addition to US 89 / US 91, Box Elder Canyon also contains Box Elder Creek, which flows westward from Mantua Reservoir, a moderately-sized water impoundment created in 1961 through the construction of an earthen-fill dam at the upper mouth of the canyon, adjacent to the small farming community of Mantua (locally pronounced "man-uh-way"). From Mantua, US‑89/US‑91 enters Dry Canyon for 3 miles (4.8 km) before the combined routes reach their apex at Sardine Summit (5,981 feet [1,823 m]). From there, the highway enters a mountain valley known as Dry Lake before traversing Wellsville Canyon (popularly but incorrectly called "Sardine Canyon") before entering the Cache Valley at Wellsville.

== See also ==
- List of canyons and gorges in Utah
