= Utah State Route 106 =

State highway in Utah, United States

State Route 106

Route information
- Maintained by UDOT
- Length: 9.426 mi (15.170 km)
- Existed: 1931; moved 1953–present

Major junctions
- South end: I-15 in West Bountiful
- US 89 in Bountiful; SR-105 in Centerville; SR-227 in Farmington; SR-225 in Farmington
- North end: US 89 in Farmington

Location
- Country: United States
- State: Utah

Highway system
- Utah State Highway System; Interstate; US; State; Minor; Scenic
← SR-105	→ SR-107

State Route 106 (SR-106) is a state highway in the U.S. state of Utah, running northerly from Bountiful to Farmington. Most of the road is the old route of US-89/US-91, and once extended further along that old alignment in each direction.

== Route description ==
The route begins at a partial diamond interchange at I-15 on exit 317. The highway heads east on 400 North, a four-lane undivided highway. The route continues through Bountiful and turns north on Main Street, a two-lane undivided road. The route continues north into Centerville. North of Chase Lane, the road begins turning northwest. By Lund Lane, the road heads due north again. By this point, the route becomes 200 East. As the highway enters Farmington, 200 East becomes State Street. Immediately after, the route turns north on Main Street. The route then turns northwest and continues in this manner until a diamond interchange with US-89 at exit 396, where it terminates.

== History ==
SR-106 was created on May 12, 1931, as a bypass of State Route 1 (US-91) from southern Bountiful to northern Farmington. (This bypass is now the route taken by US-89, mostly overlapping I-15, the former crossing of South 500 West and South Main Street in Bountiful and SR-273 in Farmington). US-91 was moved to the bypass, and, for a while, the old route (still SR-1) was signed as U.S. Route 91 Alternate. In 1953, the Utah State Legislature switched SR-1 and SR-106, taking SR-106 along the older route, and extended SR-106 north along former SR-1 to southern Layton (now exit 330 of I-15) in conjunction with a new bypass of SR-1 south of Layton. (The rest of old SR-106 in northern Farmington became an extension of SR-49, now US-89.) A minor change on May 8, 1961, moved SR-106 from Main Street west to 200 West through Bountiful, taking southbound SR-106 over the Parkin Overpass at its south end. SR-106 was further extended south along old SR-1 to the north side of Salt Lake City (I-15 exit 312) in 1962, when SR-1 was moved to match the planned Interstate 15, and north via Ogden to the Utah Hot Springs (I-15 exit 351) on November 25, 1966, replacing more of SR-1.

This extension of SR-106 through Ogden only lasted until 1969; that year, the State Legislature removed the part between 200 North in Kaysville and the I-15 interchange (now exit 330) in southern Layton, and redesignated the part from southern Layton north to Utah Hot Springs as SR-84. On March 7, 1969, the Utah State Department of Highways (now the Utah Department of Transportation) added Shepard Lane in northern Farmington to the state highway system, from SR-106 west to US-89 (SR-49). SR-106 was rerouted over this roadway, ending at US-89, in order to eliminate a hazardous intersection where US-89 and SR-106 had crossed. The former SR-106 was renumbered SR-272 south of and SR-273 north of this intersection. The old alignment north of Shepard Lane, where still state-maintained, has since become SR-273, SR-126, SR-26, and US-89. As part of the 1977 renumbering, the short piece of SR-106 between Becks and the Parkin Overpass, which was signed as US-89, officially became part of that route.

State Route 131 was added to the state highway system on June 26, 1933, as a loop off SR-1 through Woods Cross. It began at South Main Street and South 800 West and preceded north on 800 West and east on 400 North to North Main Street. As part of the change to SR-106 (which had replaced SR-1 at the north end of SR-131) made on May 8, 1961, SR-131 was truncated from North Main Street to North 200 West, since this portion was now SR-106. SR-131 was truncated to run only along 400 North, from I-15 (SR-1) east to SR-106, by the 1969 State Legislature; most of the former route was deleted from the state highway system, but the southernmost part on 800 West, connecting US-89 (SR-106) to I-15 (SR-1), became an extension of SR-93, which ran east from this I-15 interchange to US-89. (This extension of SR-93 was removed from the state highway system in 1985, but the original piece remains.) A short extension to SR-131 was made on April 25, 1997, adding 400 North from I-15 west over the Union Pacific Railroad's Salt Lake Subdivision to the route.

In early 2001, the city of Bountiful requested that UDOT give up maintenance on the part of SR-106 along 200 West between 500 South (SR-68) and 400 North (SR-131). The state agreed on February 9, 2001, and SR-106 took over what had been SR-131. The portion of SR-106 from SR-68 south to the Parkin Overpass became an extension of SR-68. SR-131 was reused in 2016.

== Major intersections ==
The entire route is in Davis County.

Location	mi	km	Destinations	Notes
West Bountiful	0.000	0.000	Beginning of state maintenance	
West Bountiful	0.169– 0.208	0.272– 0.335	Bridge over the Union Pacific Railroad's Salt Lake Subdivision	
West Bountiful	0.231– 0.277	0.372– 0.446	I-15 south	
West Bountiful–Bountiful line	0.445	0.716	US 89 (500 West) to I-15 north	
Bountiful	0.796	1.281	200 West	Former SR-106 south; SR-106 from mile 0.000 to here was SR-131
Centerville	3.046	4.902	SR-105 west (Parrish Lane/400 North)	
Centerville	3.573	5.750	Chase Lane (1000 North)	Former SR-255 south
Farmington	7.294	11.739	SR-227 west (State Street)	
Farmington	8.294	13.348	SR-225 west (Park Lane/675 North)	
Farmington	9.049	14.563	North Main Street	Former SR-272 north
Farmington	9.378	15.092	US 89	
Farmington	9.426	15.170	End of state maintenance	
1.000 mi = 1.609 km; 1.000 km = 0.621 mi
