= Utah State Route 273 =

State highway in Utah, United States

State Route 273
- SR-273 highlighted in red

Route information
- Maintained by UDOT
- Length: 3.084 mi (4.963 km)
- Existed: 1969–present

Major junctions
- South end: US 89 in Farmington
- North end: I-15 in Kaysville

Location
- Country: United States
- State: Utah

Highway system
- Utah State Highway System; Interstate; US; State; Minor; Scenic
← SR-271	→ SR-274

State Route 273 (SR-273) is a state highway completely within Davis County in the northern portion of the U.S. state of Utah that connects Farmington and US-89 to Kaysville and I-15.

== Route description ==
The route begins as a continuation of SR-106 at a diamond interchange on US-89 at exit 397. The road heads northwest on Main Street in Farmington, a four-lane undivided highway. A golf course appears on the northern end of the street. The road enters Kaysville and turns north briefly before turning west on 200 North. The route continues west five blocks before a diamond interchange with I-15 at exit 328 appears. Immediately after this intersection, SR-273 terminates at the junction of 600 West, a road paralleling the freeway.

== History ==
The road from Farmington northwest through Kaysville to Layton was added to the state highway system in 1910, and in the 1920s it became part of SR-1 and US-91. SR-1 was moved to the present alignment of I-15 in that area in 1953, and the old route became SR-106. The state legislature removed the portion of SR-106 between 200 North in Kaysville and I-15 in southern Layton from the state highway system in 1969, and instead took SR-106 west on 200 North to end at I-15. 200 North had been State Route 110 since 1931, initially running west from SR-1 (later SR-106) in Kaysville to West Kaysville. In 1941, it was extended east to SR-49 (US-89), and in 1969 it was all eliminated except for the piece that became SR-106.

However, before the 1969 amendments became effective, the State Road Commission further truncated SR-106 due to the planned reconstruction of North Farmington Junction, where SR-106 crossed SR-49 (US-89). Traffic would no longer be able to cross US-89 at that point, nor could southbound traffic turn left from US-89 to SR-106. To retain full access, SR-106 was sent west on Shepard Lane in Farmington to end at US-89, while the old alignment became two new routes: State Route 272 from Shepard Lane to US-89 and State Route 273 from US-89 to I-15 in Layton. An interchange replaced the old intersection at North Farmington Junction in about 2000, and in 2001 SR-272 became part of SR-273. Less than four months later, former SR-272 was deleted from the state highway system, returning SR-273 to its 1969 and present extent.

== Major intersections ==
The entire route is in Davis County.

Location	mi	km	Destinations	Notes
Farmington	0.000	0.000	US 89 (James V. Hansen Highway) to I-15	Southern terminus; grade-separated intersection
Kaysville	2.969	4.778	I-15 – Salt Lake City, Ogden	
Kaysville	3.084	4.963	600 West	Northern terminus
1.000 mi = 1.609 km; 1.000 km = 0.621 mi
