= Utah State Route 226 =

State highway in Utah, United States

State Route 226
- SR-226 highlighted in red

Route information
- Maintained by UDOT
- Length: 3.003 mi (4.833 km)
- Existed: 1941–present

Major junctions
- West end: Snowbasin
- East end: SR-167 near Huntsville

Location
- Country: United States
- State: Utah

Highway system
- Utah State Highway System; Interstate; US; State; Minor; Scenic
← SR-225	→ SR-227

State Route 226 (SR-226) is a state highway in the U.S. state of Utah, connecting the Snowbasin ski resort with SR-167.

== Route description ==
SR-226 begins at the entrance to Snowbasin, which is located on the east slope of the Wasatch Range near Mount Ogden in the Uinta-Wasatch-Cache National Forest. It heads south and ascends slightly to the former main entrance (now overflow parking), where it curves east and follows the north slope of the ridge that separates the Ogden and Weber River watersheds, slowly descending to the end at SR-167 (New Trappers Loop Road). The road is two lanes with wide shoulders.

== History ==
The state legislature created SR-226 in 1941, two years after Snowbasin opened. The initial route descended the mountain to the northeast with a number of hairpin curves, ending at SR-39 southwest of Huntsville in the Ogden Valley. A second route - State Route 227 - was to split from SR-226 and follow Wheeler Creek northwest to SR-39 near the Pineview Dam, creating a shortcut between the Wasatch Front and Snowbasin, but this was never built and was removed from the state highway system in 1953. In order to provide better access to the resort for the 2002 Winter Olympics, the state built a new access road from SR-167 (itself recent construction) west to Snowbasin, transferring the old road (except where incorporated into the new road, between the old and new main entrances) to Weber County in 2001.

== Major intersections ==
The entire route is in Weber County.

Location	mi	km	Destinations	Notes
	0.000	0.000	Snowbasin	
	0.697	1.122	Snowbasin overflow parking	
	3.003	4.833	SR-167	
1.000 mi = 1.609 km; 1.000 km = 0.621 mi
