= List of U.S. Highways in Utah =

- Highway markers for U.S. Highways in Utah

Highway names
- US Highways: US Highway nn (US nn)

System links
- Utah State Highway System; Interstate; US; State; Minor; Scenic

The U.S. Highways in Utah are maintained by the Utah Department of Transportation (UDOT). The United States Numbered Highway System is a nationwide system with only a small portion of its routes entering Utah. Originally, the State Road Commission of Utah, created on March 23, 1909, was responsible for maintenance, but these duties were rolled into the new UDOT in 1975. There are 2,061.979 miles (3,318.434 km) of U.S. Highways in the state. The longest is U.S. Route 89 at 502.577 miles (808.819 km) and the shortest is U.S. Route 89A at 2.94 miles (4.73 km). Six former U.S. Highways exist in the state of Utah; of these, five have been replaced by current interstate and U.S. Highways, while the other was replaced by a state route. The most recent change was the redesignation of U.S. Route 666 as U.S. Route 491 in 2003.

== Mainline routes ==
| Number | Length (mi) | Length (km) | Southern or western terminus | Northern or eastern terminus | Formed | Removed | Notes |
|---|---|---|---|---|---|---|---|
| US 6 | 373.963 | 601.835 | US 6 / US 50 at the Nevada state line towards Ely | I-70 / US 6 / US 50 at the Colorado state line towards Grand Junction | 1936 | current | US 6 enters Utah through Delta, joined with US 50 until just after Delta and crosses across the middle of the state before joining I-70 and US 50 again to enter into Colorado, east of Cisco. |
| US 30S | — | — | Idaho state line near Snowville | Wyoming state line towards Evanston | 1926 | c. 1970 | Replaced by I-80 / I-84 / US 189 |
| US 40 | 174.624 | 281.030 | I-80 at Silver Creek Junction near Park City | US 40 at the Colorado state line towards Dinosaur | 1926 | current | US 40 starts at I-80 outside of Park City and heads through Heber City and Duchense before passing into Colorado near the Dinosaur National Monument. |
| US 50 | 334.920 | 539.001 | US 6 / US 50 at the Nevada state line towards Ely | I-70 / US 6 / US 50 at the Colorado state line towards Grand Junction | 1926 | current | US 50 enters Utah joined with US 6 until just outside Delta, crossing the midsection of Utah, before joining with I-70 for its final 174 miles (280 km) to Colorado. |
| US 89 | 502.577 | 808.819 | US 89 at the Arizona state line towards Page | US 89 at the Idaho state line at Bear Lake | 1926 | current | US 89 is the longest U.S. Highway in Utah, going from the Arizona border to Idaho, paralleling I-15 for a good majority of the route, but it does split off at the north and south end of the route. |
| US 91 | 45.271 | 72.857 | I-15 south of Brigham City | US 91 at the Idaho state line towards Preston | 1926 | current | The highway currently serves as a connection between the Cache Valley area of Utah and Idaho to the Salt Lake and Pocatello population centers. |
| US 160 | — | — | US 6 / US 50 at Crescent Junction | Colorado state line near Monticello | — | 1970 | Replaced by US 163/US 666 (modern US 191 and US 491) |
| US 163 | 41.405 | 66.635 | US 163 at the Arizona state line in Monument Valley | US 191 at Bluff | 1970 | current | US 163 enters Utah in Monument Valley in the southeastern part of the state, across the San Juan River towards Bluff. |
| US 189 | 29.216 | 47.019 | I-15 south of Provo | I-80 / US 189 at the Wyoming state line towards Evanston | 1938 | current | From I-15 in Provo northeast through Provo Canyon to Heber City. From this point it overlaps US 40 until it intersects I-80, at which point it overlaps I-80 until the Wyoming border near Evanston. |
| US 189 | — | — | US 91 in Nephi | US 89 at Pigeon Hollow Junction | — | 1938 | Replaced by SR-132 |
| US 191 | 404.168 | 650.445 | US 191 at the Arizona state line towards Ganado | US 191 at the Wyoming state line towards Rock Springs | 1981 | current | US 191 enters Utah in the southeastern part of the state and travels northward through Moab, veers to the northwest to Price, and back to the northeast through Vernal, before exiting into Wyoming near Flaming Gorge Reservoir. |
| US 450 | — | — | US 6 / US 50 at Crescent Junction | Colorado state line near Monticello | 1926 | — | Replaced by US 160 (modern US 191 and US 491) |
| US 491 | 17.020 | 27.391 | US 191 in Monticello | US 491 at the Colorado state line towards Dove Creek | 2003 | current | From US 191 in Monticello eastward until it exits the state into Colorado. |
| US 530 | — | — | US 40 near Park City | US 30S near Echo | 1926 | — | Replaced by US 189 (modern I-80) |
| US 666 | — | — | US 191 in Monticello | US 666 at the Colorado state line towards Dove Creek | 1970 | 2003 | Replaced by US 491 |
Former

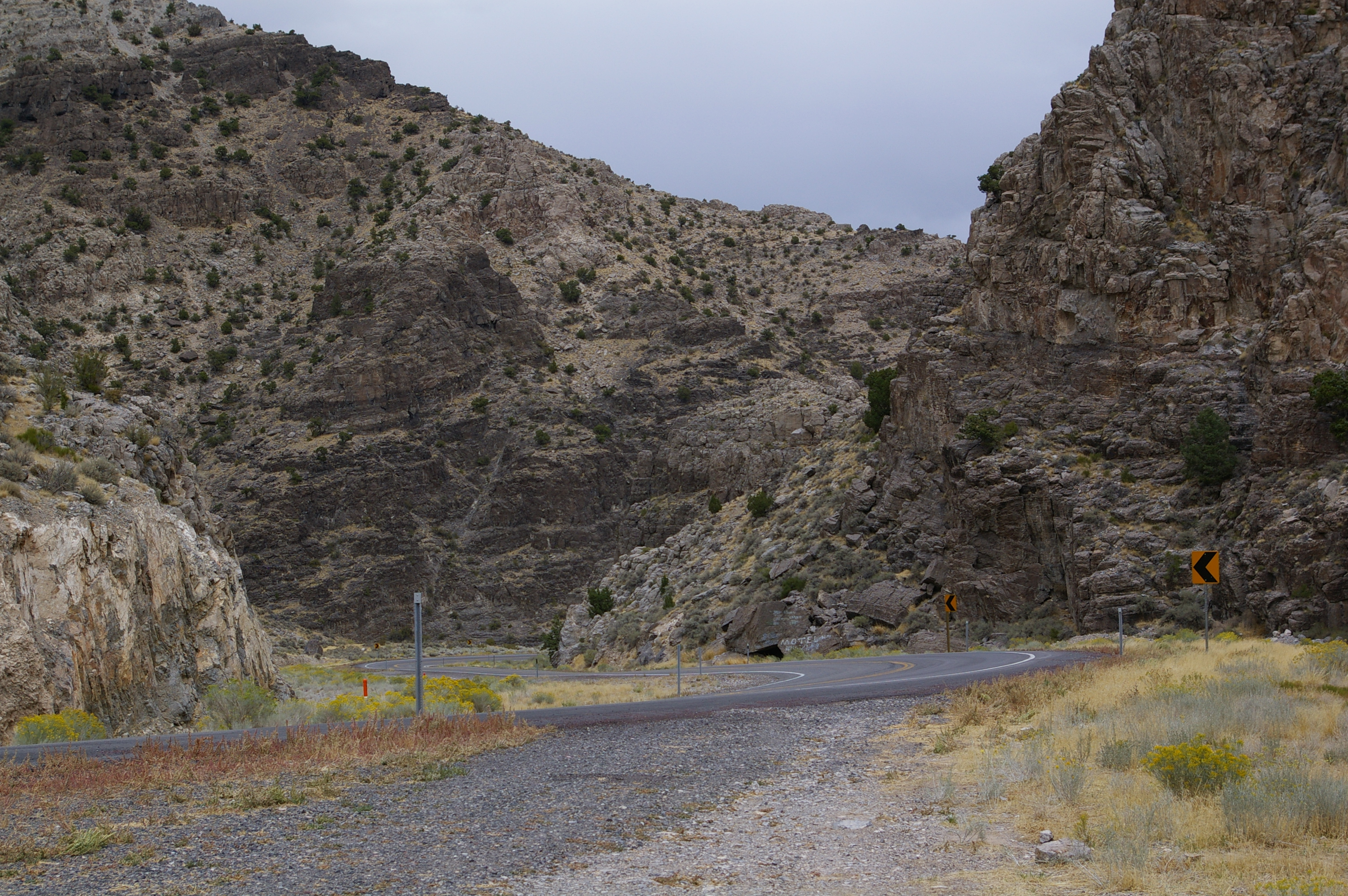
US 50 descending from Skull Rock Pass in western Utah

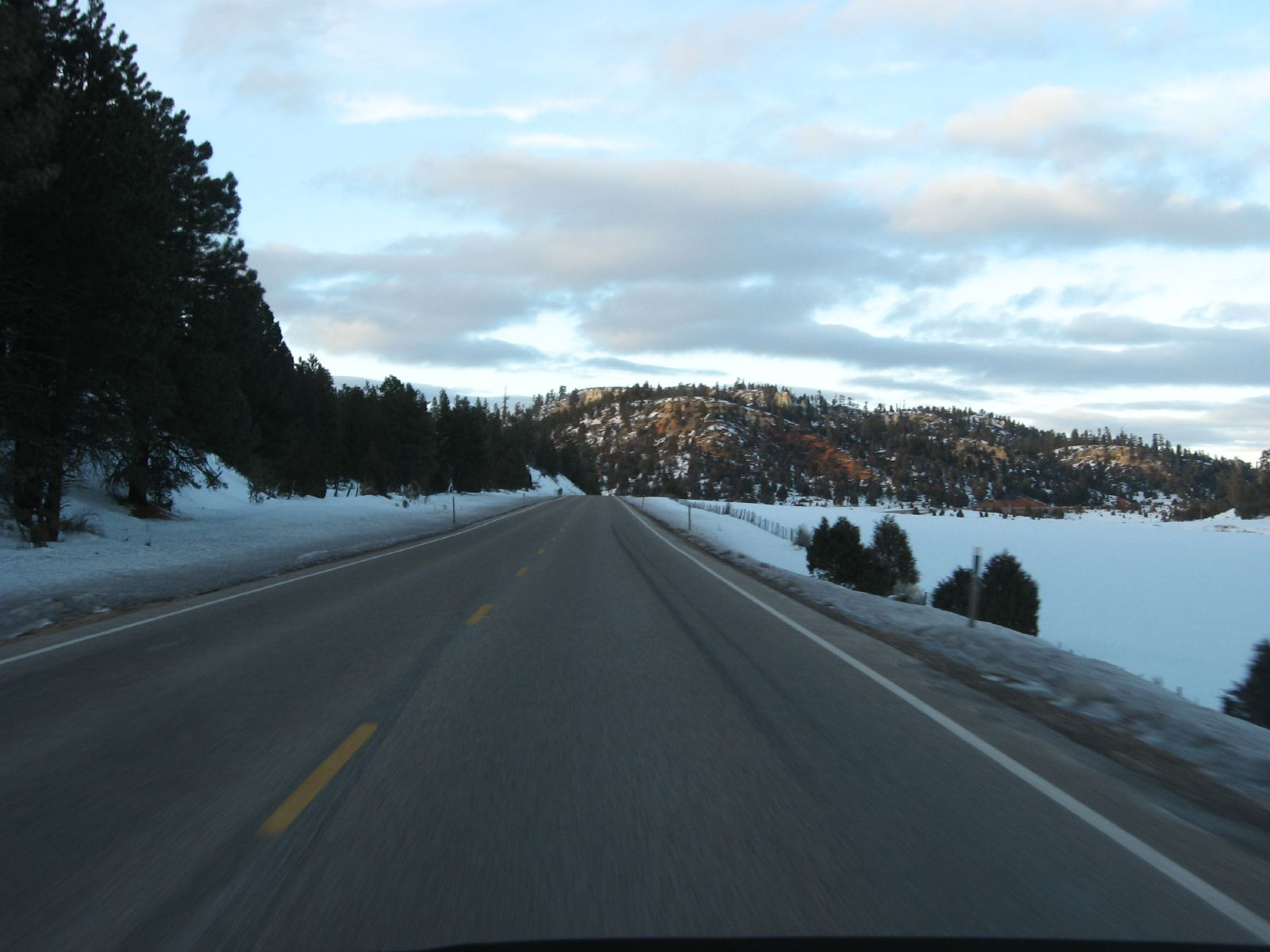
US 89 near Long Valley Junction, a Utah Scenic Byway

== Special routes ==
| Number | Length (mi) | Length (km) | Southern or western terminus | Northern or eastern terminus | Formed | Removed | Notes |
|---|---|---|---|---|---|---|---|
| US 6 Bus. | 3.43 | 5.52 | US 6/US 191 in Helper | US 6/US 191 in Spring Glenn (south of Helper) | 1953 | current | Serves Helper, former US 6 through downtown. Currently co-signed US 191 Business. Was previously cosigned US 50 Business |
| US 6 Bus. | 2.942 | 4.735 | US 6/US 191 in Price | US 6/US 191 in Price | 1975 | current | Cosigned SR-55; former routing of US 6/50 |
| US 40 Alt. | — | — | State Street | mouth of Parley's Canyon | 1964 | 1974 | Served Salt Lake City along modern SR 186/Foothill Blvd. Was signed US 40 ALt in 1964, signed mainline US 40 in 1965, reverted back to Alternate in the 1970s. |
| US 40 Alt. | — | — | Kimball Junction | east of Park City | 1953 | 1969 | Served Park City |
| US 50 Alt. | — | — | Ely, Nevada | Provo | 1954 | 1976 | Former mainline US 50. Utah portion was entirely concurrent with other US Routes except for the portion that is modern SR 201. Most of the Nevada portion is today US 93 ALT/US 93. |
| Temp. US 50 | — | — | Colton, Utah | Castle Gate | 1912 | 1927 | Exited the Price River Canyon along modern US 191 near Castle Gate and returned via Emma Park Road to bypass a narrow, meandering portion of the canyon. |
| US 89A | 2.94 | 4.73 | US 89A at the Arizona state line towards Fredonia | US 89 in Kanab | 1960 | current | Original routing of US 89 prior to the construction of the Glen Canyon Dam; demoted to an auxiliary route listed as SR-11 until 2008; provides access to Grand Canyon National Park from Utah |
| US 89A | — | — | Corner of 300 West and North Temple st in Salt Lake City | South Salt Lake | — | — | Routed along 300 West in Salt Lake City. Co-signed US 91 ALT |
| US 89A | — | — | North Salt Lake | Farmington | c. 1930 | — | Former US 89/91, Modern SR 106 |
| US 91 Alt. | — | — | Corner of 300 West and North Temple St in Salt Lake City | South Salt Lake | — | — | Cosigned US 89 ALT, along 300 West in Salt Lake City |
| US 91 Alt. | — | — | North Salt Lake | Farmington | c. 1930 | — | Cosigned with US 89 ALT, modern SR 106 |
| US 91 Alt. | — | — | Layton | Ogden | — | — | Former US 91, modern SR 26, SR 126 and briefly SR 273 |
| US 189 Alt. | — | — | Hailstone | Wanship | — | — | Modern SR 32. Modern SR 32 has alternated designations between US 189 and US 189ALT. |
| US 191 Bus. | 3.43 | 5.52 | US 6/US 191 in Helper | US 6/US 191 in Spring Glenn (south of Helper) | 1981 | current | Serves Helper Cosigned US 6 Business, former mainline US 6/50 |
Former
