= List of named highway junctions in Utah =

A number of highway junctions in the U.S. state of Utah have names that appear on maps and in state laws designating the highways. Sometimes the junction name also refers to the surrounding community or area as well as just the highway junction itself. In a few instances, the highway junction shares the name with a nearby railroad junction. Such sharing of names does not include the many, many named railroad junctions within the state, some of whose name also refers to the surrounding community or area, but has no relation to any highway junction (for example, Cache Junction). La Sal Junction is a very small town with no running businesses.

There is also a town named Junction (which is the county seat of Piute County) where US 89 and SR-153 meet.

Junction name	Intersecting roads	County	Location	Notes	Refs
Airport Junction	I-80; SR-154; North Temple Street	Salt Lake	Western Salt Lake City, near SLC International Airport; I-80 exit 115		
Alton Junction	US 89; Alton Road (Johnson Valley Road)	Kane	About 4 miles (6.4 km) west of Alton	Alton Road (Johnson Valley Road) runs between US-89 and Alton; and was formerly designated as SR-136	
Anderson Junction	I-15; SR-17 (North Toquerville Boulevard)	Washington	I-15 Exit 27, near Anderson's Ranch, in north Toquerville		
Bear Valley Junction	US 89; SR-20	Garfield	About 10 miles (16 km) north of Panguitch	The junction is named simply "Orton" in state laws	
Beryl Junction	SR-18 (North Beryl Highway); SR-56	Iron	About 13 miles (21 km) south of Beryl	The junction was formerly called Modena Junction	
Big Plain Junction	Former alignment of SR-58; Smithsonian Butte Road	Washington	Central Apple Valley	Smithsonian Butte Road runs north from the junction to Rockville Junction and Rockville and was formerly designated as SR-16 (1920s-1935). Big Plain Junction also refers to the community surrounding the new junction about 2 miles (3.2 km) north on Smithsonian Butte Road that was created by the realignment of SR-58.	
Bothwell Junction	I-80; SR-102 (West 11200 North/Main Street)	Box Elder	East of Bothwell and immediately southwest of Tremonton		
Bryce Canyon Junction	US 89; SR-12	Garfield	About 7 miles (11 km) south-southeast of Panguitch		
Castle Dale Junction	SR-10; SR-29	Emery	About 3 miles (4.8 km) northeast of Castle Dale		
Castleton Junction	SR-128; La Sal Loop Road	Grand	About 3.5 miles (5.6 km) north of Castle Valley and 11 miles (18 km) northeast of Moab on the south bank of the Colorado River	The ghost town of Castleton is about 1 mile (1.6 km) southeast of the town of Castle Valley	
Cedar Breaks Junction	SR-14; SR-148	Iron	About 3 miles (4.8 km) south of Cedar Breaks National Monument		
Clifton Flat Junction	Lower Gold Hill Road; Old Lincoln Highway National Historic Trail	Tooele	About 10 miles (16 km) northeast of Ibapah and about 19 miles (31 km) north-northwest of Callao	Lower Gold Hill Road was once part of the Old Lincoln Highway	
Columbia Junction	SR-124; West 400 North	Carbon	Southeast East Carbon-Sunnyside	West 400 South heads east from the junction towards the former town of Columbia (which now comprises the southeast part of East Carbon). Columbia Junction also refers to a nearby railroad junction, which is a few miles northwest of the road junction, but still within the city limits of East Carbon.	
Crescent Junction	I-70 (Exit 182); US 191	Grand	About 20 miles (32 km) east of Green River	The name Crescent Junction refers to the small community in the area, as well as the highway interchange, both of which are south of the railroad right of way. Brendel Junction, which is northeast of Crescent Junction, refers primarily to the railroad junction in the area (and the area north of the railroad junction). Because of their proximity, the names of the two junctions are often confused and mistakenly used interchangeably.	
Crossroads	SR-13 (North Beryl Highway); SR-102	Box Elder	East Tremonton	Crossroads is how Haws Corner is labeled on many maps	
Curlew Junction	SR-30; SR-42	Box Elder	About 18 miles (29 km) west of Snowville		
Downtown Junction	I-15; I-80; SR-269	Salt Lake	Downtown Salt Lake City, I-15 exits 306-308, I-80 exits 120-121		
Echo Junction	I-80; I-84	Summit	Echo		
Eden Junction	SR-39; SR-158	Weber	About 5 miles (8.0 km) south-southwest of Eden on the southern edge of the Pineview Dam		
Enterprise Junction	SR-18; SR-300	Washington	Snow Canyon State Park, about 10 miles (16 km) north of St. George	Prior to 1999 the entirety of SR-300 was part of SR-8	
Fish Lake Junction	SR-24; SR-25	Piute	About 7 miles (11 km) southwest of Fish Lake and about 13 miles (21 km) west-northwest of Loa		
Fremont Junction	SR-72; SR-76	Sevier	About 14 miles (23 km) south-southwest of Emery and about 29 miles (47 km) north-northeast of Fremont	Although the junction is located immediately south of I-70 / US 50, the nearest I-70 interchanges are Exit 91, which is about 2 miles (3.2 km) east-northeast, and Exit 86, which is about 2.5 miles (4.0 km) west	
Gravel Springs Junction	US 89; Local (county) road heading southeast to Alton	Kane	About 3 miles (4.8 km) northwest of Alton		
Greendale Junction	US 191; SR-44	Daggett	About 9 miles (14 km) southwest of Dutch John and 34 miles (55 km) north of Vernal		
Grouse Creek Junction	SR-30; Grouse Creek Road	Box Elder	About 9 miles (14 km) east of the Utah-Nevada border and about 20 miles (32 km) south of Grouse Creek		
Harrisburg Junction	I-15 (Exit 16); SR-9	Washington	Western edge of Hurricane	The neighborhood in Hurricane that is named after the junction extends east from the junction for about 1.5 miles (2.4 km) and is labeled as Harrisburg Junction on most maps	
Haws Corner Junction	SR-13; SR-102 (East Main Street)	Box Elder	East Tremonton	Referenced as simply "Haws Corner" in the state code; labeled as "Crossroads" on many maps	
Hailstone Junction	US 40 (former routing); US 189 (former routing)	Wasatch	Former site of Hailstone Junction (now covered by the Jordanelle Reservoir) is near the current site of the community of Hailstone, about 7 miles (11 km) north of Heber City and about 7 miles (11 km) west of Francis		
Hiawatha Junction	SR-122; Burma Road	Carbon	East of Hiawatha, immediately east of the railroad tracks	The section of Burma Road heading southwest from the junction towards Huntington was formerly SR-236.	
Hooper Junction	SR-53; Midland Drive; Pennsylvania Avenue	Weber	Southwest Ogden (where I-15 now crosses) northeast of Hooper	Midland Drive is also referred to as Hooper Road; Pennsylvania Avenue runs both south and northeast from the junction (the northeastern course is also SR-53)	
Horseshoe Canyon Junction	Hans Flat Road; Lower San Rafael Road	Wayne	About 2 miles (3.2 km) west-northwest of the Horseshoe Canyon Unit of the Canyonlands National Park		
Hot Springs Junction	US 89; SR-126	Box Elder	South Willard		
Ioka Junction	US 40 / US 191; SR-87	Duchesne	About 5 miles (8.0 km) southwest of Roosevelt and about 5 miles (8.0 km) north of Myton		
Jericho Junction	US 6 Local road to the Little Sahara Recreation Area	Juab	About 16 miles (26 km) north east of Lynndyl		
Kamas Junction	Old US 40; SR-248	Wasatch	North of the current Jordanelle Reservoir and west of Kamas (Note: Due to limited reference material and extensive highway realignments, specific details regarding the exact location of the Kamas Junction and the former Keetley Junction is very limited.)		
Keetley Junction:	US 40 / US 189; SR-248	Summit	About 13 miles (21 km) north of Heber City	The current Keetley Junction replaced the former, which was about 5 miles (8.0 km) south-southeast of the new site. The former Keetley Junction was the junction between the former alignment of US 40 and the former SR-223. The site of the former Keetley Junction is now covered by the Jordanelle Reservoir. Keetley Junction can also refer to a former railroad junction just east of the present highway junction of the same name.	
Kimball Junction	I-80; SR-224	Summit	About 7 miles (11 km) north-northwest of Park City		
Kingston Junction	US 89; SR-62	Piute	About 2 miles (3.2 km) south of Junction and about 2 miles (3.2 km) west of Kingston		
Koosharem Junction	SR-24; SR-62	Sevier	About 5 miles (8.0 km) northeast of Koosharem and about 20 miles (32 km) northwest of Loa		
La Sal Junction	US 191; SR-46	San Juan	About 2 miles (3.2 km) west of La Sal		
La Verkin Junction	SR-9 (East 500 North); SR-17 (North State Street)	Washington	La Verkin		
Lagoon Junction	I-15; US 89; SR-67 (Legacy Highway)	Davis	Central Farmington, immediately northwest of the Lagoon amusement park		
Lake Point Junction	I-80; SR-201	Tooele	About 4 miles (6.4 km) northeast of Lake Point and about 7 miles (11 km) west of Magna, immediately southwest of the Salt Lake County line on the southeast shore of the Great Salt Lake		
Lampo Junction	SR-83; West 7200 North	Box Elder	About 7 miles (11 km) east of Golden Spike National Historic Site and 7 miles (11 km) south of Howell		
Logan Junction	US 89; US 91	Cache	Downtown Logan		
Long Valley Junction	US 89; SR-14	Kane	About 2.5 miles (4.0 km) north-northwest of Alton and about 10 miles (16 km) east of Duck Creek Village		
Mammoth Junction	US 6 SR-36	Juab	About 1 mile (1.6 km) northwest of Mammoth 1.5 miles (2.4 km) southwest of Eureka	(Note: Over the years there has been substantial name re-designation and minor roadway realignment in the area of the Mammoth and Tintic junctions. Originally the roadways in the area formed a rough triangle (with sides of 1–2 miles (1.6–3.2 km). The eastern side (with a slight curve to the west) was US-6/US-50, the southwestern (straight) side was SR-36, and the northwestern (straight) side was a local road. The northern junction (US-6/US-50 and the local road, plus another local road leading south-southeast to Mammoth) was designated as Mammoth Junction and the western junction (SR-36 and the local road) was designated as Tintic Junction, with the southern junction (US-6/US-50 and SR-36) being unnamed. The US-50 designation was later applied to a separate highway further south in the state and the local road on the northwestern side was designated as SR-36, with the southwestern side being temporarily re-designated as SR-67. Later the southwestern side was re-designated once again as SR-36 (with two sections leading to Tintic Junction). Finally, the SR-36 designation was removed from the northwestern side (leaving it as a local road once again) and the Tintic Junction was applied to the formerly unnamed junction (US-6 and SR-36). The final result appears much the same as the original, except that Tintic Junction moved about a mile southeast.)	
McBeth Corner	South 5600 West; West 10400 South	Utah	West Mountain area, about 3 miles (4.8 km) west of Payson	South 5600 West is also SR-141 southbound from West 10400 South and SR-147 northbound from West 10400 South. As of October 2013, Google Maps incorrectly shows incorrectly shows the former routing (pre-2001) of SR-147 heading east (as West 10400 South) to Payson, rather than north from McBeth Corner.	
Midvale Junction	US 89 (State Street); Center Street (7720 South)	Salt Lake	West central Midvale	Midvale Center Street was formerly SR-48)	
Midway Junction	US 40 / US 189 ?	Wasatch		The Highway 189 Resolutions references "Midway Jct." but does not provide any specific details as to the road that forms the junction with US-40. The limited details are that it is within Wasatch County in or north of Heber City but south of "South Mayflower".	
Mills Junction (Juab County)	I-15 (Exit 207); SR-78	Juab	About 2.5 miles (4.0 km) east of Mills and about 10 miles (16 km) southwest of Levan, immediately southwest of Chicken Creek Reservoir		
Mills Junction (Tooele County)	SR-36; Pole Canyon Rd (formerly SR-138)	Tooele	Immediately northeast of Stansbury Park		
Moark Junction	US 6 US 89; SR-198	Utah	East Spanish Fork	While defined as the junction of these three highways, due to minor realignment of the highways over the years, the current intersection of US-89 and US-6 and the current intersection of US-6 and SR-198 are over 0.5 miles (0.80 km) apart. US-89 and SR-198 do not ever actually meet.	
Modena Junction	SR-18 (North Beryl Highway); SR-56	Iron	About 13 miles (21 km) south of Beryl	Modena Junction was renamed Beryl Junction	
Mount Carmel Junction	US 89; SR-9	Kane	About 4 miles (6.4 km) south-southwest of Orderville		
New Castle Junction	SR-56; Main St/Bench Rd (formerly SR-16)	Iron	New Castle	SR-16 between SR-56 in New Castle and SR-18 near Enterprise existed from 1935 until retirement in 1955. It still exists as a paved shortcut between the towns.	
North Farmington Junction	US 89; SR-273; SR-106	Davis	North Farmington, just south of Fruit Heights		
North Salt Lake Junction	I-15; I-215; US 89	Davis	Southern edge of North Salt Lake, I-15 exits 312-313	Wye interchange	
Nye's Corner	SR-126; SR-79	Weber	Western Ogden		
Orangeville Junction	SR-29; North Main Street (formerly SR-57) at 300 North	Emery	Orangeville	SR-29 and North Main Street run concurrent between 300 North and the north end of Main Street (SR-29 then curves northwest)	
Orton	US 89; SR-20	Garfield	About 10 miles (16 km) north of Panguitch	"Orton" is how Bear Valley Junction is referenced in state laws	
Otter Creek Junction	SR-22; SR-62	Piute	Immediately southwest of Otter Creek Reservoir, about 4 miles (6.4 km) north-northwest of Antimony, and about 10 miles (16 km) west of Kingston		
Park City Junction	SR-224; SR-248	Summit	Northwest Park City		
Park Valley Junction	SR-30; Local road heading southeast to Golden Spike National Historic Site (formerly SR-83)	Box Elder	About 10 miles (16 km) east-northeast of Park Valley		
Parkin Junction (or Parkin Overpass)	US 89; SR-68 (formerly SR-106)	Davis	On the border of Bountiful and Woods Cross	Sources frequently misspell the name as "Parking Junction" or "Parking Overpass" (including the references provided)	
Parley's Junction	I-80; I-215; SR-186; Parley's Way	Salt Lake	Eastern Salt Lake City, near Milcreek, I-80 exits 129-130, I-215 exits 1-2		
Penny's Junction	SR-36; SR-73	Tooele	About 2 miles (3.2 km) northeast of Rush Valley		
Pigeon Hollow Junction	US 89; SR-132	Sanpete	About 4.5 miles (7.2 km) north-northeast of Ephraim, about 5 miles (8.0 km) southwest of Spring City, and about 7 miles (11 km) south of Moroni		
Plateau Junction	SR-24; SR-62	Sevier	About 1 mile (1.6 km) east of Burrville and about 5 miles (8.0 km) northeast of Koosharem		
Poplar Grove Junction	I-80; I-215; SR-68	Salt Lake	Poplar Grove neighborhood of Salt Lake City, I-80 exits 117-118, I-215 exit 22		
Promontory Junction	West 7200 North (formerly SR-83); North 22000 West	Box Elder	About 1 mile (1.6 km) north of Promontory		
Quinn's Junction	US 40; SR-248	Summit	Park City		
Rainbow Junction	Local roads	Uintah	About 14 miles (23 km) south of Bonanza		
Riverdale Junction	SR-26 (West Riverdale Road); SR-60 (South 1050 West)	Weber	Riverdale		
Rockville Junction	SR-9; South 200 East (Bridge Road)	Washington	Rockville	South 200 East is the "road south to Big Plain Junction"	
Rowley Junction	I-80 (Exit 77); SR-196	Tooele	About 15 miles (24 km) northwest of Grantsville	Intersection is also known as Timpie Junction or Timpie Interchange and the area is also known as Timpie and Timpie Springs	
Sage Creek Junction	SR-16; SR-30	Rich	About 4 miles (6.4 km) west of the Wyoming border, about 8 miles (13 km) north-northeast of Randolph, and about 10 miles (16 km) east-southeast of Laketown		
Sevier Junction	US 89; Clear Creek Canyon Road/Sevier Highway (formerly SR-4)	Sevier	Sevier	SR-4 was the main transportation corridor through the area prior to the completion of I-70 just north of the junction	
Silver Creek Junction	I-80 (Exit 146); US 40	Summit	About 2.5 miles (4.0 km) northeast of Snyderville, about 4 miles (6.4 km) north of Park City, and about 15 miles (24 km) north of Heber City		
Soldier Creek Junction	US 6 / US 191; Soldier Creek Road (North 2200 East)	Carbon	East Wellington, near where the Soldier Creek empties into the Price River	Soldier Creek Road heads north to Nine Mile Canyon	
Spaghetti Bowl	I-15; I-80; SR-201	Salt Lake	South Salt Lake, but the northernmost portion is in Salt Lake City		
Stansbury Road Junction	Ellerbeck Road (formerly SR-2); Stansbury Road	Tooele	Flux, about 4.5 miles (7.2 km) northwest of Grantsville	The former SR-2 followed the route of the old Lincoln Highway in this area	
Sunnyside Junction	US 6 / US 191; SR-123	Carbon	About 3.5 miles (5.6 km) west of East Carbon-Sunnyside and about 7 miles (11 km) east of Wellington		
Tabiona Junction	US 40; SR-208	Duchesne	About 6 miles (9.7 km) east of Fruitland and about 11 miles (18 km) south of Tabiona		
Thistle Junction	US 6 US 89	Utah	Former town of Thistle	Due to the Thistle Landslide in 1983, the junction was flooded and covered by a lake; subsequent highway realignments eliminated the former junction	
Timpie Junction	I-80 (Exit 77); SR-196	Tooele	About 15 miles (24 km) northwest of Grantsville	Timpie Junction was the more common name for Rowley Junction until about 1970 when a chemical plant was sited in nearby Rowley	
Tintic Junction	US 6 SR-36	Juab	About 2.5 miles (4.0 km) southwest of Eureka	The current location of the junction is about a mile southeast of the previous location	
Trachyte Junction	SR-95; SR-276	Garfield	About 26 miles (42 km) south-southeast of Hanksville and north of Trachyte Point		
Tropic Junction	SR-12; SR-63; John's Valley Road (formerly part of SR-22)	Garfield	About 6 miles (9.7 km) northwest of Tropic		
Uintah Junction	I-84; US 89	Weber	Southeast edge of Uintah, just north of the Weber River		
Wanship Junction	I-80; SR-32 (formerly US 189	Summit	Wanship		
Washboard Junction	SR-10; SR-155	Carbon	Price		
Webster Junction	US 91; SR-61	Cache	Far eastern edge of Lewiston		
Widtsoe Junction	Johns Valley Road (formerly SR-22); Old Escalante Road (formerly SR-23)	Garfield	Immediately west of the ghost town of Widtsoe and about 15 miles (24 km) northeast of Bryce Canyon City		
Wye Junction	Lund Highway (formerly SR-127); Horse Hollow Road	Iron	About 16 miles (26 km) north-northwest of Cedar City and about 16 miles (26 km) southeast of Lund		
