= Utah State Route 62 =

State highway in Utah, United States

State Route 62

Route information
- Maintained by UDOT
- Length: 42.833 mi (68.933 km)
- Existed: 1931–present

Major junctions
- West end: US 89 near Junction
- SR-22 at Otter Creek Junction
- East end: SR-24 at Plateau Junction

Location
- Country: United States
- State: Utah

Highway system
- Utah State Highway System; Interstate; US; State; Minor; Scenic
← SR-61	→ SR-63

Utah State Route 62 (SR-62) is a state highway in the U.S. state of Utah. Over a span of 42.8 miles (68.9 km), it connects the cities of Junction and Kingston in Piute County to SR-24 in Sevier County to the northwest.

== Route description ==
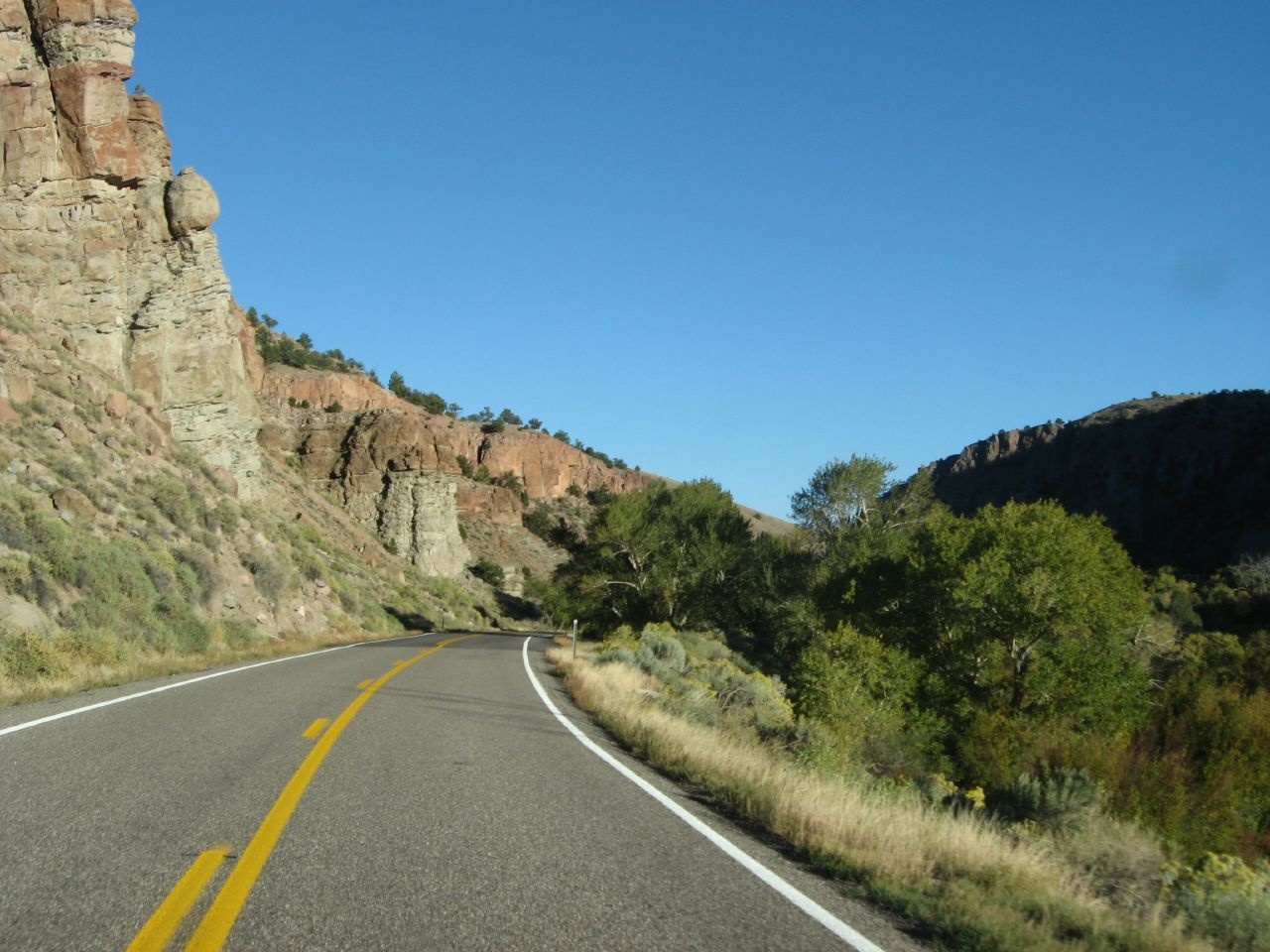
SR-62 as it goes through Kingston Canyon

The route begins on US-89 just south of Junction and proceeds east through the city of Kingston and into Kingston Canyon alongside the East Fork Sevier River. After approximately 9 miles (14 km), the route exits the canyon into Grass Valley and turns to the north-northeast as it passes SR-22 (to Antimony) and Otter Creek Reservoir. Continuing north-northeast through Grass Valley, the route passes through the towns of Angle, Greenwich, and Koosharem. The route turns to the northwest as it passes by Burrville, exits Grass Valley, and enters Plateau Valley shortly before it ends at its intersection with SR-24.

== History ==
The road from Plateau Junction to SR-22 was designated a state highway in 1931 as State Route 62. In 1953, a spur was added to the town of Burrville. In 1962, the route was realigned along Otter Creek Reservoir to a new road slightly to the west. In 1967, the portion of SR-22 from former SR-11 (US-89) was reassigned to SR-62. In 1969, the Burrville spur was removed.

== Major intersections ==
County	Location	mi	km	Destinations	Notes
Piute	Junction	0.000	0.000	US 89	Western terminus
Piute	Otter Creek Junction	12.330	19.843	SR-22 – Antimony	
Sevier	Plateau Junction	42.833	68.933	SR-24	Northern terminus
1.000 mi = 1.609 km; 1.000 km = 0.621 mi
