= Utah State Route 22 =

State highway in Utah, United States

State Route 22
- SR-22 highlighted in red

Route information
- Maintained by UDOT
- Length: 6.852 mi (11.027 km)
- Existed: 1914 as a state highway; 1927 as SR-22–present

Major junctions
- South end: Johns Valley Road in Antimony
- North end: SR-62 at Otter Creek Junction

Location
- Country: United States
- State: Utah

Highway system
- Utah State Highway System; Interstate; US; State; Minor; Scenic
← SR-21	→ SR-23

State Route 22 (SR-22) is a state highway in southern Utah, running for 6.852 miles (11.027 km) in Garfield and Piute Counties from Antimony to Otter Creek Reservoir.

== Route description ==
SR-22 begins in Antimony as a continuation of Johns Valley Road and heads generally north through a canyon to Otter Creek Reservoir and Otter Creek State Park, where it ends at an intersection with SR-62.

== History ==
The road from Widtsoe north to Antimony became a state highway in 1914, and in 1915 it was extended west to SR-11 (by 1926 US-89) in Junction. A forest road from Widtsoe south to SR-12 at Tropic Junction was added to the system in 1923, and in 1927 the legislature designated the entire route from Junction to Tropic Junction as SR-22. To improve route continuity on a shortcut between California and Colorado that included the portion of SR-22 between US-89 and SR-62 at Otter Creek Junction, that part was transferred to SR-62 in 1967. (With the completion of I-70 through the San Rafael Swell in 1970, this is no longer a popular route.) The legislature removed Johns Valley Road from the state highway system in 1969, turning SR-22 into a short spur from SR-62 to the bridge over Antimony Creek just south of Antimony.

== Major intersections ==
County	Location	mi	km	Destinations	Notes
Garfield	Antimony	0.000	0.000	Johns Valley Road	Southern terminus
Piute	Otter Creek Junction	6.852	11.027	SR-62 – Junction, Koosharem	Northern terminus
1.000 mi = 1.609 km; 1.000 km = 0.621 mi
