= National Register of Historic Places listings in Piute County, Utah =

Location of Piute County in Utah

This is a list of the National Register of Historic Places listings in Piute County, Utah.

This is intended to be a complete list of the properties and districts on the National Register of Historic Places in Piute County, Utah, United States. Latitude and longitude coordinates are provided for many National Register properties and districts; these locations may be seen together in a map.

There are 2 properties listed on the National Register in the county.

This National Park Service list is complete through NPS recent listings posted March 21, 2025.

== Current listings ==
	Name on the Register	Image	Date listed	Location	City or town	Description
1	John and Ella Morrill House	John and Ella Morrill House	April 7, 1994 (#94000294)	95 N. Main St. 38°14′17″N 112°13′11″W	Junction	
2	Piute County Courthouse	Piute County Courthouse	April 16, 1971 (#71000844)	21 N. Main St. 38°14′14″N 112°13′11″W	Junction	

== See also ==
- List of National Historic Landmarks in Utah
- National Register of Historic Places listings in Utah
