= Utah State Route 124 =

State highway in Utah, United States

State Route 124
- SR 124 highlighted in red

Route information
- Maintained by UDOT
- Length: 7.956 mi (12.804 km)
- Existed: 1935–present

Major junctions
- South end: "End State Maintenance" sign near Horse Canyon Mine in Emery County
- North end: SR-123 (Whitmore Canyon Road) in East Carbon

Location
- Country: United States
- State: Utah

Highway system
- Utah State Highway System; Interstate; US; State; Minor; Scenic
← SR-123	→ SR-125

Utah State Route 124 (SR-124) is a state highway in the U.S. state of Utah. Spanning 7.9 miles (12.7 km), it connects the cities of Sunnyside and East Carbon in Carbon County with Horse Canyon Mine in Emery County.

== Route description ==
State Route 124 begins near Horse Canyon Mine along the Book Cliffs in northern Emery County. It starts out traveling west, but soon curves to the north as it crosses the county line into Carbon County. The route continues north along the base of the Book Cliffs, through Columbia Junction just west of Columbia, and finally takes a jog to the west just before ending at its intersection with SR-123 in East Carbon.

== History ==
The road from Sunnyside south to Columbia (along with the road from Sunnyside west to Sunnyside Junction) was designated as SR-124 in 1931, and renumbered to SR-123 in 1933. In 1935, the portion from Sunnyside to Columbia was split off and designated as SR-124, which was extended south to Horse Canyon Mine in 1945. Since then, only minor legal description changes have occurred such as reversing the described direction from southerly to northerly, and replacing "via Columbia" with "through Columbia Junction" after the town of Columbia became part of newly incorporated East Carbon.

== Major intersections ==
County	Location	mi	km	Destinations	Notes
Emery		0.000	0.000	"End State Maintenance" sign	Southern terminus
Carbon	Columbia Junction	5.481	8.821	West 400 North	
Carbon	East Carbon-Sunnyside	7.956	12.804	SR-123 – US-6	Northern terminus
1.000 mi = 1.609 km; 1.000 km = 0.621 mi
