= Utah State Route 63 (disambiguation) =

State Route 63

Location
- Country: United States
- State: Utah

Highway system
- Utah State Highway System; Interstate; US; State; Minor; Scenic
← SR-62	→ SR-64

Utah State Route 63 is a state highway in southeastern Garfield County, Utah, United States, that connects Bryce Canyon National Park with Utah State Route 12 at Tropc Junction.

Utah State Route 63 may also refer to:

- Utah State Route 63 (1931-1971), a former state highway in northwestern Sevier and eastern Millard counties in Utah, United States, that connected U.S. Route 89 in Salina with Utah State Route 1 (former routing of U.S. Route 91) southwest of Scipio
- Utah State Route 63A (1953-1969), North State Street, a former state highway near the eastern edge of Millard County, Utah, United States, that connected the former Utah State Route 63 (at Center and State streets) in Scipio with Utah State Route 1 (former routing of U.S. Route 91) north of Scipio

== See also ==
- List of state highways in Utah
- List of highways numbered 63
