= Utah State Route 123 =

State highway in Utah, United States

State Route 123
- SR-123 highlighted in red

Route information
- Maintained by UDOT
- Length: 11.421 mi (18.380 km)
- Existed: 1931 (as SR-124, renumbered in 1933)–present

Major junctions
- West end: US 6 / US 191 at Sunnyside Junction
- SR-124 in East Carbon
- East end: Whitemore Canyon Road in East Carbon

Location
- Country: United States
- State: Utah

Highway system
- Utah State Highway System; Interstate; US; State; Minor; Scenic
← SR-122	→ SR-124

Utah State Route 123 (SR-123) is a state highway in the U.S. state of Utah. Spanning 11.4 miles (18.3 km), it connects the city of East Carbon with US-6 / US-191 in Carbon County.

== Route description ==
State Route 123 begins at Sunnyside Junction on US-6/US-191, about 15 miles (24 km) southeast of Price. It heads east, passing through East Carbon-Sunnyside at the base of the Book Cliffs. It turns to the northeast and terminates shortly after it enters Whitmore Canyon.

== History ==
The road from Sunnyside Junction through Sunnyside to Columbia (now all part of East Carbon-Sunnyside) was added to the state highway system in 1931, initially numbered SR-124 but changed to SR-123 in 1933. The route was shortened in 1935 by moving the eastern terminus back into Sunnyside, and splitting off the portion from Sunnyside to Columbia as SR-124.

== Major intersections ==
The entire route is in Carbon County.

Location	mi	km	Destinations	Notes
Sunnyside Junction	0.000	0.000	US 6 / US 191 – Price, I-70	Western terminus
East Carbon	8.694	13.992	SR-124 – Horse Canyon	
East Carbon	11.421	18.380	"End State Maintenance" sign — Whitemore Canyon Road	Eastern terminus
1.000 mi = 1.609 km; 1.000 km = 0.621 mi
