= Grass Valley (Piute and Sevier counties, Utah) =

Valley in eastern Piute and Sevier counties in Utah, United States

Coordinates: 38°16′26″N 111°57′11″W

Grass Valley is a long, narrow valley in eastern Piute and Sevier counties, Utah, United States.

== Description ==
The valley is bounded on the west and southwest by the Sevier Plateau, on the east by the Parker Range, and is connected to Plateau Valley to the north.

It is also the home of Otter Creek Reservoir (and its eponymous state park), and the towns of Angle, Greenwich, and Koosharem.
