= Utah State Route 63 =

State highway in Garfield County, Utah, United States

State Route 63
- SR 63 highlighted in red

Route information
- Maintained by UDOT
- Length: 2.6463 mi (4.2588 km)
- Existed: 1975–present

Major junctions
- South end: North boundary of Bryce Canyon National Park
- North end: SR-12 at Tropic Junction

Location
- Country: United States
- State: Utah
- Counties: Garfield

Highway system
- Utah State Highway System; Interstate; US; State; Minor; Scenic
← SR-62	→ SR-64

Utah State Route 63 (SR 63) is a 2.6463-mile (4.2588 km) state highway on the Paunsaugunt Plateau in southwestern Garfield County, Utah, United States, that connects Bryce Canyon National Park with Utah State Route 12 (A Journey Through Time Scenic Byway, a National Scenic Byway) at Tropic Junction (immediately north of Bryce Canyon City).

== Route description ==
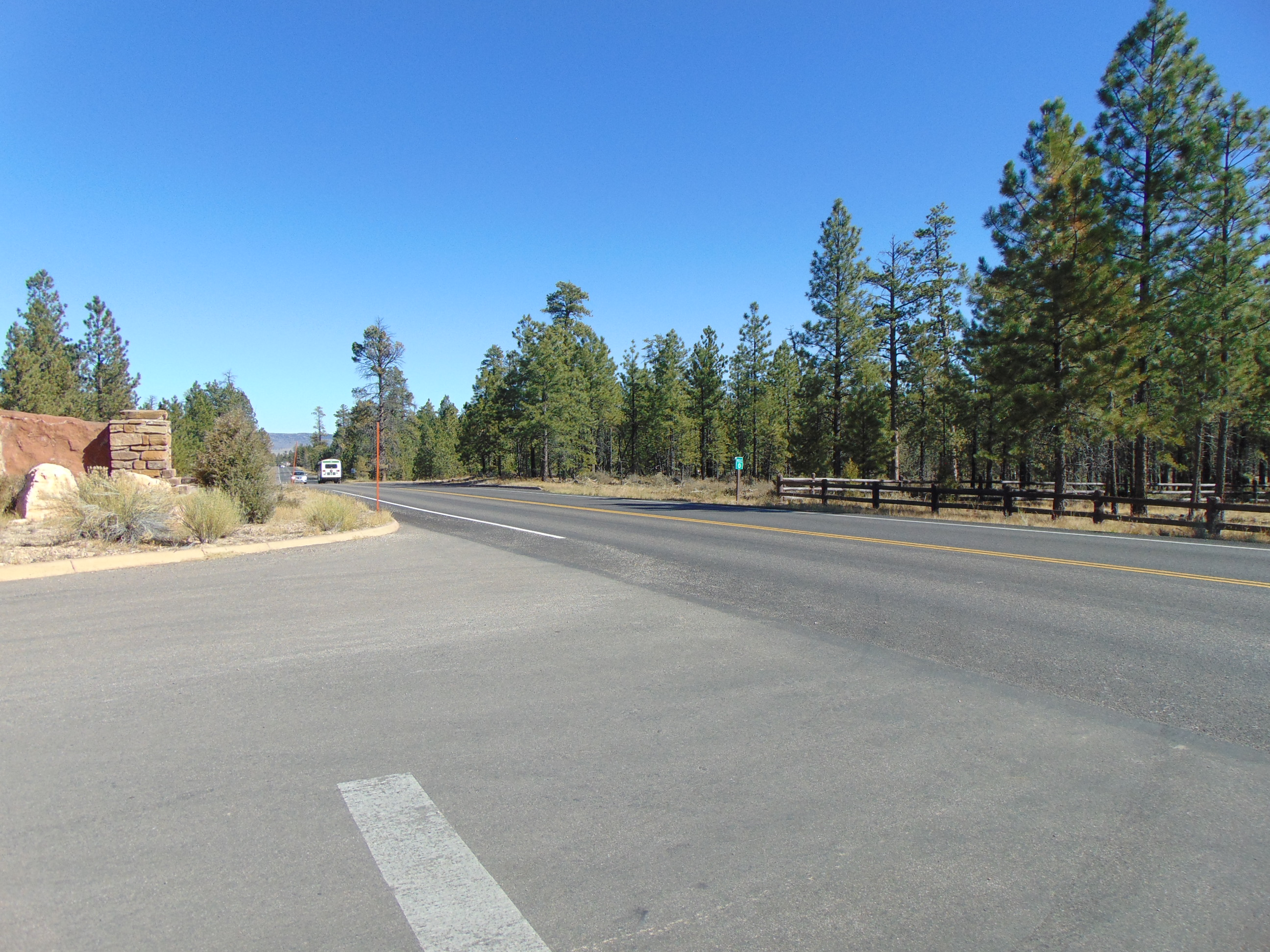
North on SR-63 from the entrance to Bryce Canyon National Park, October 2017

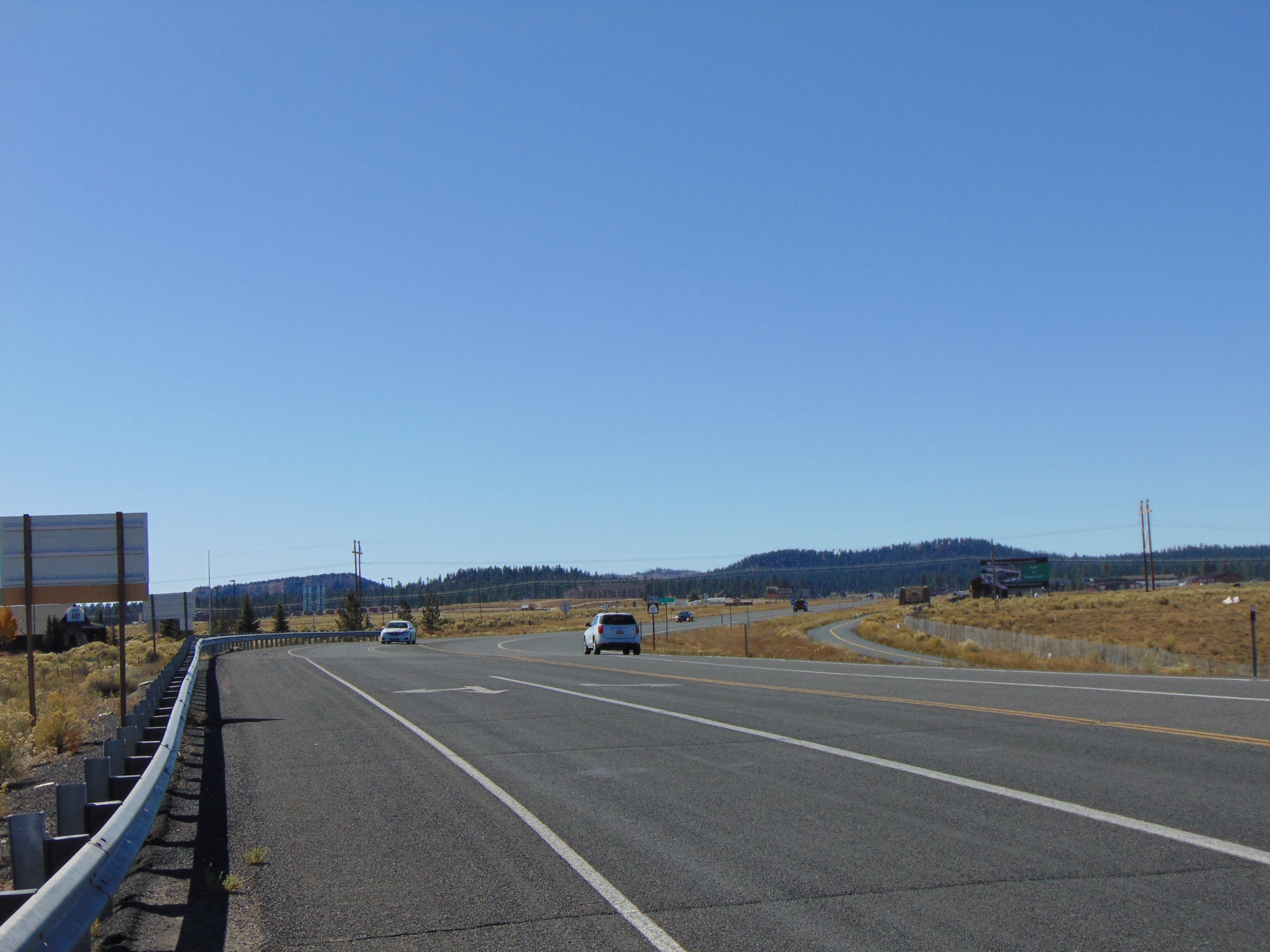
South along SR-63 from Tropic Junction, October 2017

SR-63 begins at the north end of Bryce Canyon National Park Rim Road at the northern border of Bryce Canyon National Park, immediately east of the Bryce Canyon National Park entrance sign. (Bryce Canyon National Park Rim Road continues south to end at the Rainbow Point view area, near the southern end of the national park. Most maps mistakenly label Bryce Canyon National Park Rim Road as SR-63. However, SR-63 does not, and never has, entered the national park.)

From its southern terminus SR-63 proceeds north as a two -lane road in the Dixie National Forest for just under one-half mile (0.80 km) before reaching a view area on the west side of the road. After just over eight-tenths of a mile (1.3 km) along its course SR-63 leaves the national forest and enters the town of Bryce Canyon City. Continuing north within Bryce Canyon City on Main Street, SR-63 quickly widens to a five-lane road before crossing over the Tropic Ditch and then crossing Center Street and 100 North.

After crossing 100 North, SR-63 narrows back to a two-lane road. A little over 2.5 miles (4.0 km) from its southern terminus, SR-63 leaves Bryce Canyon City and promptly arrives at its northern terminus at Tropic Junction, a roundabout with SR-12 and the southern end of Johns Valley Road. (SR-12 heads easterly toward Tropic, Escalante, and Boulder. SR-12 heads westerly via Red Canyon to end at U.S. Route 89 [US 89] at Bryce Canyon Junction. US 89 heads north toward Panguitch and south toward Kanab.)

=== Legal definition ===
The legal definition of State Route 260 is as follows:

72-4-112.  State highways -- SR-61 to SR-68 and SR-70.(3) SR-63. From Bryce National Park north boundary northerly to Tropic Junction on Route 12.[4]

=== Traffic volume ===
The Average Daily Traffic (AADT) on SR-63 in 2023 was 5,601.

== History ==
=== Original designation ===
On May 12, 1931, the highway in northern Sevier and eastern Millard counties that connected Utah State Route 11 (US 89) in Salina with Utah State Route 1 (U.S. Route 91) in Scipio was designated as SR-63. Just over 40 years later, on August 27, 1971, the SR-63 designation was withdrawn, and that section of highway became part of the newly designated Utah State Route 26 (SR-26). However, by 1977 the SR-26 designation was also removed, and the highway became part of the current routing of U.S. Route 50 (with the official designation of Utah State Route 50).

=== Current designation ===
In 1914 Utah State Route 12 (SR-12) was established as a highway from Bryce Canyon Junction to Tropic, via Red Canyon. Nine years later, in 1923, the southern end of Utah State Route 22 (SR-22) was extended south from Antimony to Tropic Junction and the road south from Tropic Junction to (what was then) Bryce Canyon National Monument was designated as a spur of SR-12. About five years later, on February 25, 1928, Bryce Canyon National Monument was officially designated as Bryce Canyon National Park. In 1969, the southern end of SR-22 was truncated back to Antimony and in 1975 the former spur of SR-12 (from the national park to Tropic Junction) was officially designated as SR-63. Since 1975 the description of the route has remained the same.

== Major intersections ==
The entire route is in Garfield County.

Location	mi	km	Destinations	Notes
	0.0000	0.0000	Bryce Canyon National Park Rim Road south – Rainbow Point	Continuation south from southern terminus into Bryce Canyon National Park
	0.0000	0.0000	North boundary of Bryce Canyon National Park	Southern terminus
Dixie National Forest	0.4534	0.7297	View area	West side of road
Tropic Junction	2.6463	4.2588	SR-12 east (A Journey Through Time Scenic Byway) – Tropic, Escalante, Boulder SR-12 west (A Journey Through Time Scenic Byway) – US 89, Panguitch, Kanab	Northern terminus; roundabout
Tropic Junction	2.6463	4.2588	Johns Valley Road north – Antimony, Otter Creek State Park	Continuation north from northern terminus: formerly the southern end of SR-22
1.000 mi = 1.609 km; 1.000 km = 0.621 mi: Route transition

== See also ==
- List of state highways in Utah
