= Burrville =

Burrville may refer to:

- Burrville (Torrington), a community of Torrington, Connecticut
- Burrville, a hamlet near Watertown, New York
- Burrville, Utah, an unincorporated community in Sevier County, Utah
- Burrville (Washington, D.C.), a neighborhood of Washington, D.C.
