= Piute County Courthouse =

- U.S. National Register of Historic Places
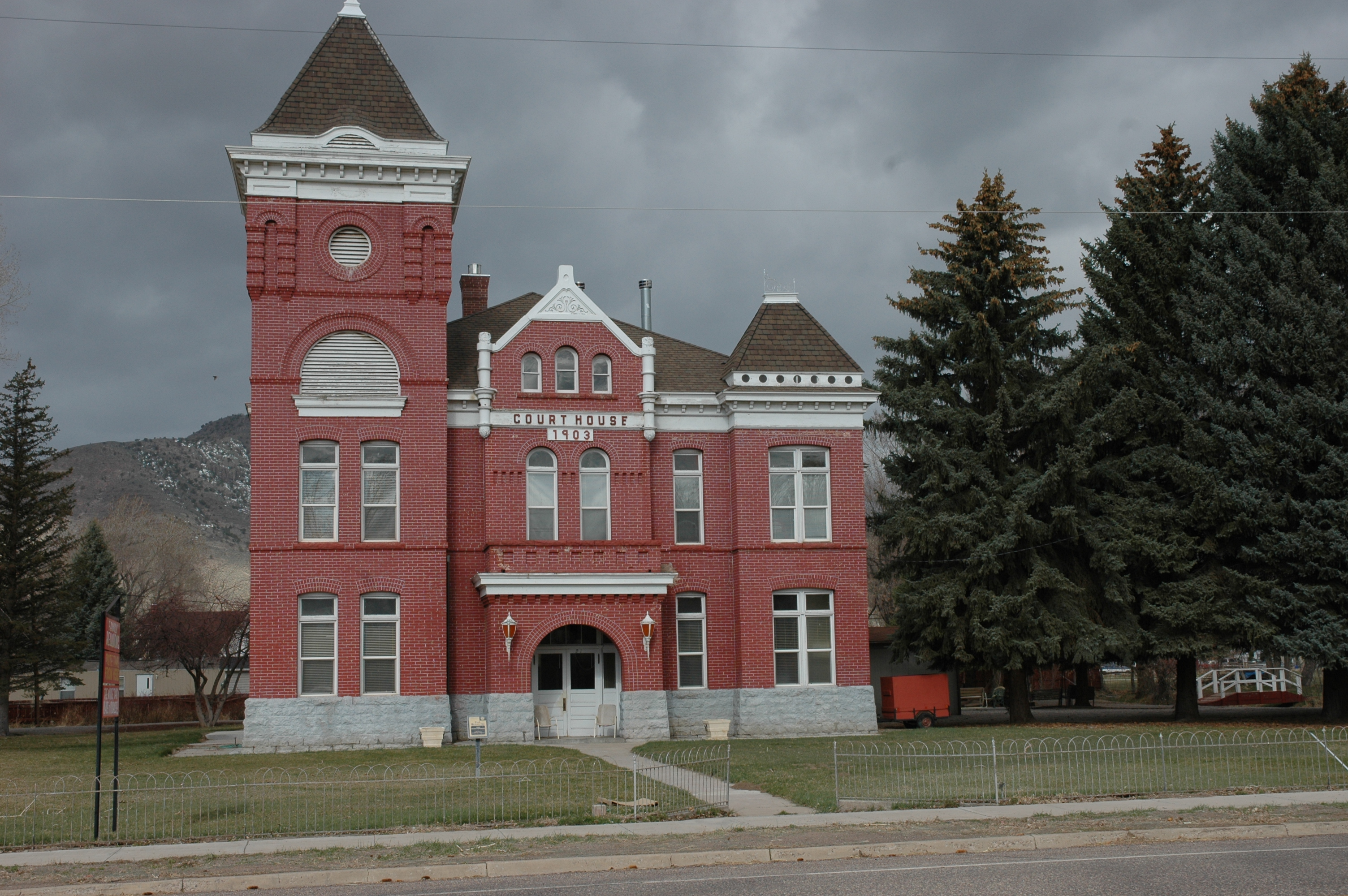

- Location within Utah Location within the United States
- Location: Main St. at Center St., Junction, Utah
- Coordinates: 38.2373°N 112.2204°W
- Area: less than one acre
- Built: 1903
- Architect: Watkins, R. C.; Young, Alan & Morrill
- Architectural style: Edwardian
- NRHP reference No.: 71000844
- Added to NRHP: April 16, 1971

The Piute County Courthouse, located at Main Street and Center Street in Junction, Utah, was built in 1903. It was listed on the National Register of Historic Places (NRHP) in 1971.

The building site was donated by John Morrill in 1902 (see the John and Ella Morrill House, also on Main Street and also NRHP-listed). It was designed by architect Richard C. Watkins in Edwardian architecture style; it was built by contractors Young, Alan & Morrill, who formed its red bricks on the building site.

The building is now rented out as the "Heritage Courthouse" for private gatherings and family reunions. The current Piute County courthouse has moved to a new location.
