= Thompsonville, Utah =

Unincorporated community in Piute County, Utah

Thompsonville
- Unincorporated community
- Location within Utah Location within the United States
- Coordinates: 38°25′01″N 112°13′00″W
- Country: United States
- State: Utah
- County: Piute
- Elevation: 5,869 ft (1,789 m)
- Time zone: UTC-7 (Mountain (MST))
  - Summer (DST): UTC-6 (MDT)
- GNIS feature ID: 1437497

Thompsonville is an unincorporated community in Piute County, Utah, United States, located south-southeast of Marysvale.

Thompsonville is served by Thompsonville Road (Piute County Road 1998), which passes north–south through the community.

Thompsonville Cemetery, a small cemetery, is located in the community along Thompsonville Road.

== Geography ==
Thompsonville has an elevation of 5,869 feet (1,789 m). Gold Creek passes through the community.
