= Greenwich, Utah =

Unincorporated community in the state of Utah, United States

Greenwich
- Unincorporated community
- Location within the state of Utah
- Coordinates: 38°25′52″N 111°55′23″W
- Country: United States
- State: Utah
- County: Piute
- Elevation: 6,854 ft (2,089 m)
- Time zone: UTC-7 (Mountain (MST))
  - Summer (DST): UTC-6 (MDT)
- ZIP codes: 84732
- GNIS feature ID: 1437572

Historical population
Census	Pop.	Note	%±
1880	514		—
1890	181		−64.8%
1910	113		—
1920	217		92.0%
1930	139		−35.9%
1940	120		−13.7%
1950	138		15.0%
Source: U.S. Census Bureau

Greenwich is an unincorporated community in northeastern Piute County, Utah, United States, just east of the Fishlake National Forest. It lies along State Route 62 northeast of the town of Junction, the county seat of Piute County. Its elevation is 6,854 feet (2,089 m). Although Greenwich is unincorporated, it has a post office, with the ZIP code of 84732. Greenwich is said to be an anglicized form of a Native American name.

== Climate ==
This climatic region is typified by large seasonal temperature differences, with warm to hot (and often humid) summers and cold (sometimes severely cold) winters. According to the Köppen Climate Classification system, Greenwich has a humid continental climate, abbreviated "Dfb" on climate maps.
