= Angle, Utah =

Unincorporated community in the state of Utah, United States

- Unincorporated community
- Location within Utah Location within the United States
- Coordinates: 38°14′57″N 111°58′36″W
- Country: United States
- State: Utah
- County: Piute
- Elevation: 6,404 ft (1,952 m)
- Time zone: UTC-7 (Mountain (MST))
  - Summer (DST): UTC-6 (MDT)
- Area code: 435
- GNIS feature ID: 1438227

Angle is an unincorporated community in Piute County, Utah, United States. The community is on Utah State Route 62 9.2 miles (14.8 km) north of Antimony.

== Climate ==
Angle has a semi-arid climate (Köppen BSk) with cold winters, cool-to-hot summers, and very large diurnal temperature variation year-round.

Climate data for Angle, Utah, 1991–2020 normals, extremes 1981–present
Month	Jan	Feb	Mar	Apr	May	Jun	Jul	Aug	Sep	Oct	Nov	Dec	Year
Record high °F (°C)	66 (19)	70 (21)	80 (27)	83 (28)	94 (34)	97 (36)	102 (39)	98 (37)	98 (37)	87 (31)	75 (24)	68 (20)	102 (39)
Mean maximum °F (°C)	54.6 (12.6)	58.3 (14.6)	68.8 (20.4)	75.3 (24.1)	81.9 (27.7)	90.4 (32.4)	94.1 (34.5)	91.6 (33.1)	86.9 (30.5)	79.4 (26.3)	67.8 (19.9)	56.9 (13.8)	94.9 (34.9)
Mean daily maximum °F (°C)	40.0 (4.4)	43.9 (6.6)	52.3 (11.3)	58.4 (14.7)	68.1 (20.1)	79.1 (26.2)	85.1 (29.5)	83.3 (28.5)	76.0 (24.4)	64.7 (18.2)	51.6 (10.9)	40.4 (4.7)	61.9 (16.6)
Daily mean °F (°C)	23.9 (−4.5)	28.5 (−1.9)	36.1 (2.3)	42.0 (5.6)	50.3 (10.2)	58.8 (14.9)	65.6 (18.7)	64.0 (17.8)	55.8 (13.2)	44.9 (7.2)	33.5 (0.8)	23.1 (−4.9)	43.9 (6.6)
Mean daily minimum °F (°C)	7.7 (−13.5)	13.0 (−10.6)	20.0 (−6.7)	25.5 (−3.6)	32.5 (0.3)	38.5 (3.6)	46.1 (7.8)	44.6 (7.0)	35.7 (2.1)	25.2 (−3.8)	15.3 (−9.3)	5.9 (−14.5)	25.8 (−3.4)
Mean minimum °F (°C)	−10.3 (−23.5)	−3.3 (−19.6)	6.8 (−14.0)	13.9 (−10.1)	21.8 (−5.7)	29.2 (−1.6)	36.4 (2.4)	36.1 (2.3)	24.5 (−4.2)	13.4 (−10.3)	−0.3 (−17.9)	−10.5 (−23.6)	−15.7 (−26.5)
Record low °F (°C)	−29 (−34)	−31 (−35)	−6 (−21)	6 (−14)	10 (−12)	22 (−6)	28 (−2)	26 (−3)	16 (−9)	−1 (−18)	−20 (−29)	−32 (−36)	−32 (−36)
Average precipitation inches (mm)	0.46 (12)	0.40 (10)	0.67 (17)	0.64 (16)	0.92 (23)	0.54 (14)	1.16 (29)	1.40 (36)	1.17 (30)	1.04 (26)	0.35 (8.9)	0.42 (11)	9.17 (233)
Average snowfall inches (cm)	6.5 (17)	3.3 (8.4)	2.8 (7.1)	1.6 (4.1)	0.2 (0.51)	0.0 (0.0)	0.0 (0.0)	0.0 (0.0)	0.0 (0.0)	0.5 (1.3)	1.8 (4.6)	3.4 (8.6)	20.1 (51)
Average precipitation days (≥ 0.01 in)	4.1	5.2	5.8	5.7	6.0	3.5	6.8	8.4	5.4	4.4	3.5	3.3	62.1
Average snowy days (≥ 0.1 in)	3.4	3.1	2.3	1.5	0.2	0.0	0.0	0.0	0.0	0.5	1.4	2.7	15.1
Source: NOAA
