= Alunite, Utah =

Alunite
- Ghost town
- Location within Utah Location within the United States
- Coordinates: 38°22′45″N 112°14′48″W
- Country: United States
- State: Utah
- County: Piute
- Established: 1915
- Abandoned: 1930
- Named for: Alunite ore
- Elevation: 6,555 ft (1,998 m)
- GNIS feature ID: 1438187

Alunite (/ˈælənaɪt/ AL-ə-nyte) is a ghost town located some 5 miles (8.0 km) south of Marysvale, near the mouth of Cottonwood Canyon in Piute County, Utah, United States. A small but important mining town during World War I, Alunite was inhabited from approximately 1915–1930.

== History ==
In 1912, a prospector named Thomas Gillan discovered a wide vein of spar in Cottonwood Canyon. The sample he sent for analysis was identified as alunite, an ore rich in both aluminum and potash. Gillan made a deal with the Mineral Products Corporation to develop the deposit, mine the alunite, and extract potash for fertilizer. By 1915, the company had constructed a reduction plant in the mouth of the canyon to produce potash from the ore. The small company town that grew up around the plant was also named after the ore and was simply called, Alunite. Because the town was so close to Marysvale, it never had its own church or business district, but it did have a school, company store, and post office.

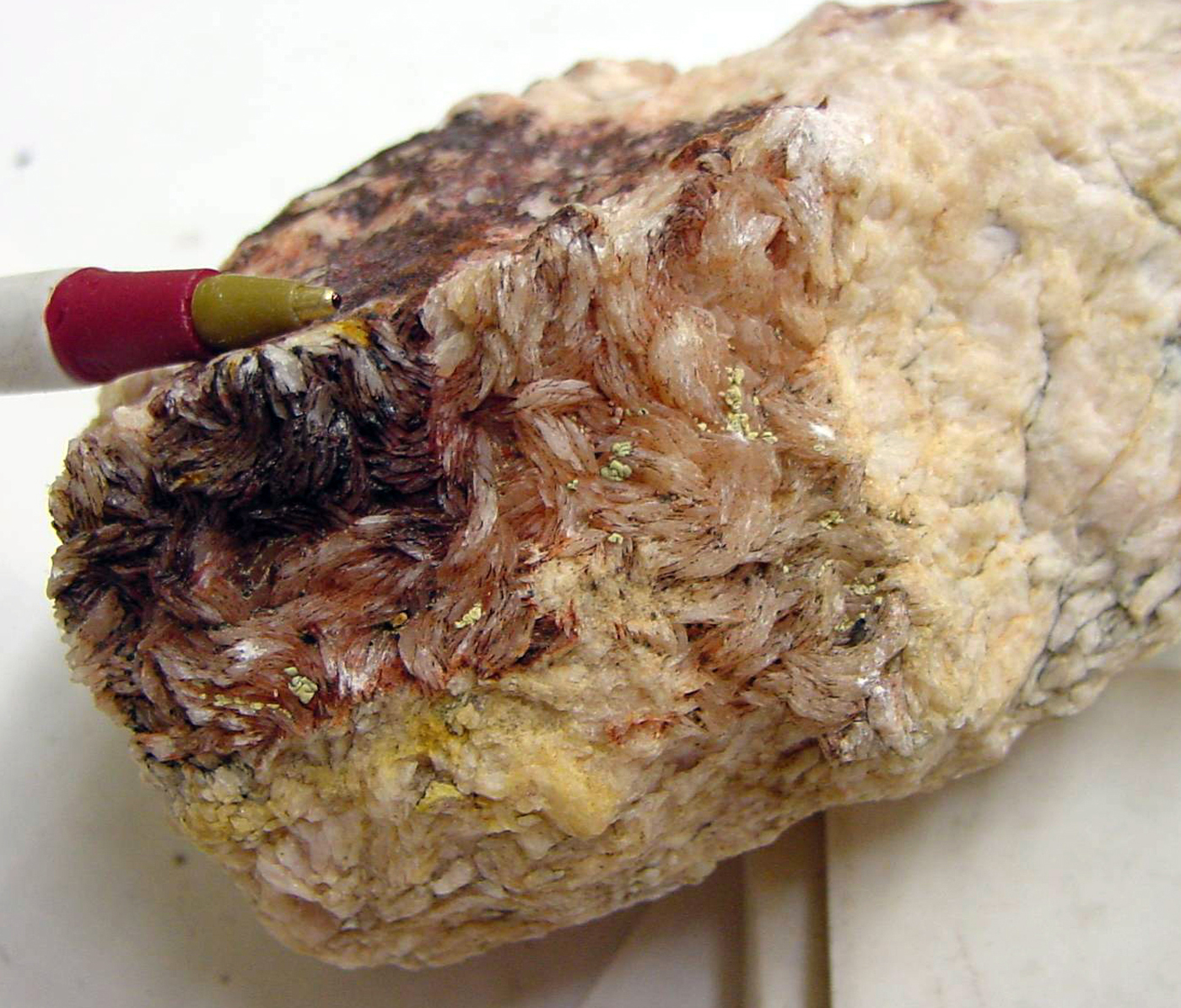
A sample of alunite from Utah, the namesake of the town

When the United States entered World War I, the Alunite mines gained strategic importance as the only domestic source of potash, needed for manufacturing explosives that was already under development. The government also saw the potential in alunite's aluminium content, and installed a 24-hour work force experimenting with processes to extract alumina from alunite. This caused an increase in the town’s employee population which reached to over 100. The war also brought rumors of foreign spies and saboteurs. Suspicious fires were blamed on enemy agents, and there were reports of people caught trying to bomb the potash plants or gather sensitive information.

Most of the alunite mining activity ended after the war. The alumina extraction experiments had been successful, but the processes developed were prohibitively expensive. Demand for potash continued to drop, until by 1930 it was too costly to produce. The mines were closed, the mill torn down, and Alunite became a ghost town. A second small attempt was made to extract aluminum during World War II, but none of the town was ever rebuilt. Alunite still lies in ruins today; but numerous foundations and walls are still visible.

== See also ==
- List of ghost towns in Utah
