= John and Ella Morrill House =

Historic house in Utah, United States

- U.S. National Register of Historic Places
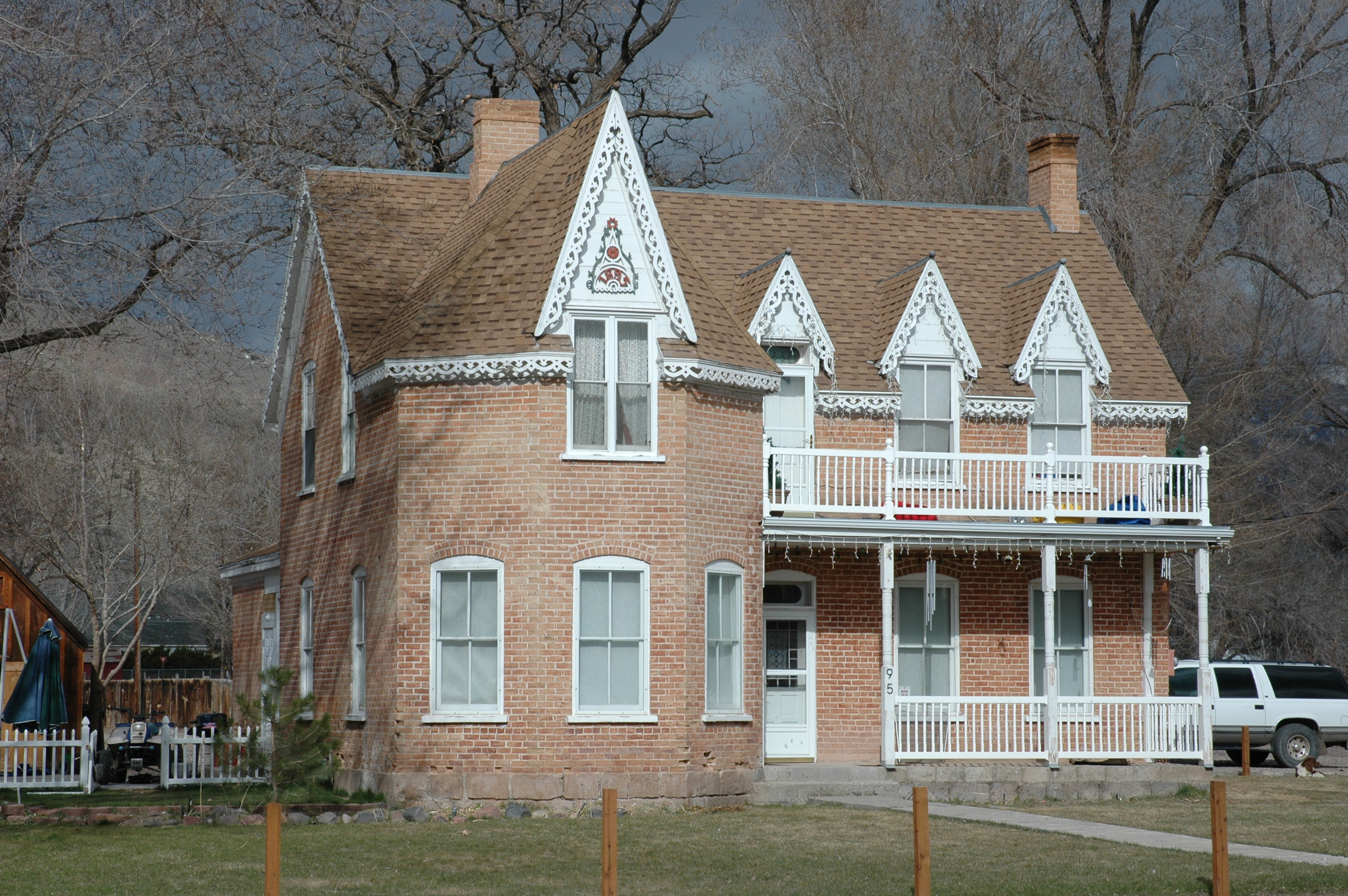

- Location within Utah Location within the United States
- Location: 95 North Main Street, Junction, Utah
- Coordinates: 38°14′17″N 112°13′11″W
- Area: less than one acre
- Built: 1895
- Built by: Morrill, John
- Architectural style: Gothic, vernacular cross-wing
- NRHP reference No.: 94000294
- Added to NRHP: April 7, 1994

The John and Ella Morrill House is a historic house located at 95 North Main Street in Junction, Utah.

== Description and history ==
Completed in 1895 and built by John Morrill, the two-story house is prominently located at the northeast corner of the central block of Main Street in Junction. It is significant as "a unique example of the Victorian Gothic style" in Junction.

It was listed on the National Register of Historic Places on April 7, 1994.
