= Utah State Route 64 =

State highway in Utah, United States

State Route 64

Route information
- Maintained by UDOT
- Length: 2.015 mi (3.243 km)
- Existed: 1975–present

Major junctions
- South end: I-15 near Holden
- North end: US 50 in Holden

Location
- Country: United States
- State: Utah

Highway system
- Utah State Highway System; Interstate; US; State; Minor; Scenic
← SR-63	→ SR-65

State Route 64 (SR-64) is a state highway in the U.S. state of Utah that serves as a connection from US-50 in the town of Holden to I-15, which bypasses the town. The route is a remnant of old US-91, bypassed by I-15.

== Route description ==
The road begins from the ramps connecting exit 174 on I-15 and heads northwest, and then turns northeast on the west-side frontage road, continuing north to serve as the Main Street of Holden. At the northern outskirts of the town, the highway terminates at US-50.

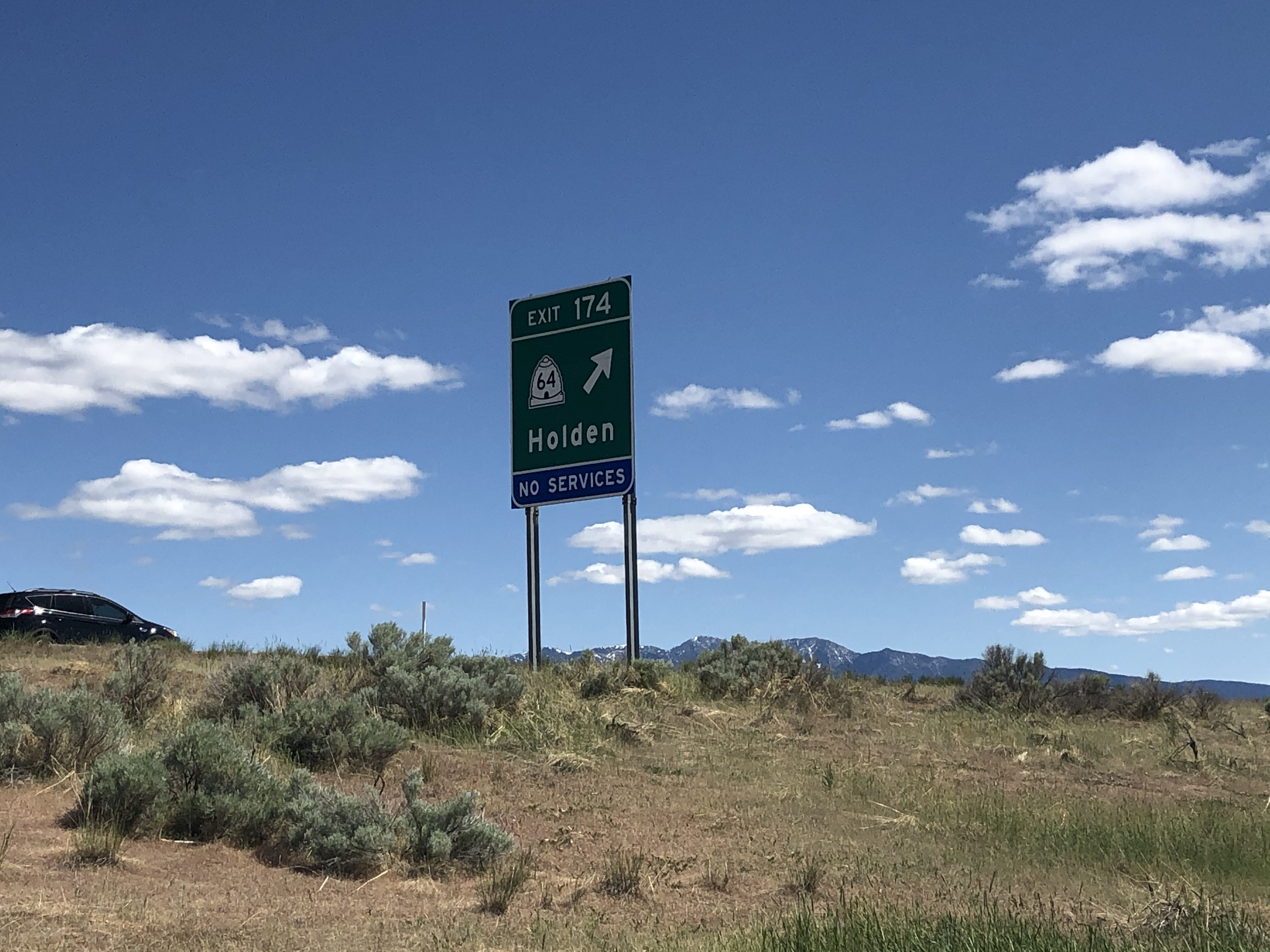
Southern end of SR64, as seen from southbound I-15. Signage on the northbound side of the freeway includes a reference to WEST US 50 (May 2020)

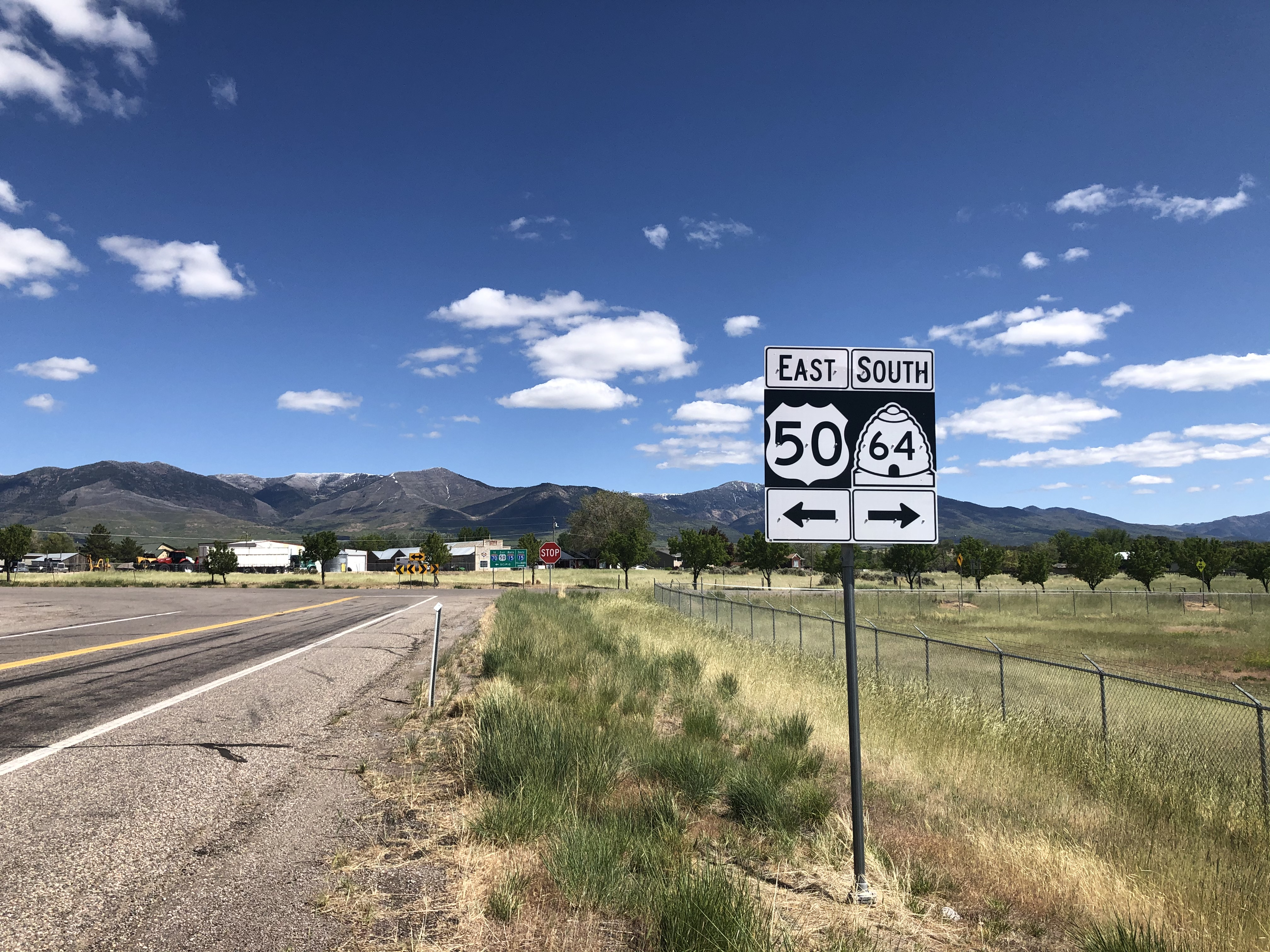
Approaching northern end of SR64. Eastbound US 50 arrives at a T-intersection at the edge of Holden and turns left, and the SR 64 is to the right (May 2020)

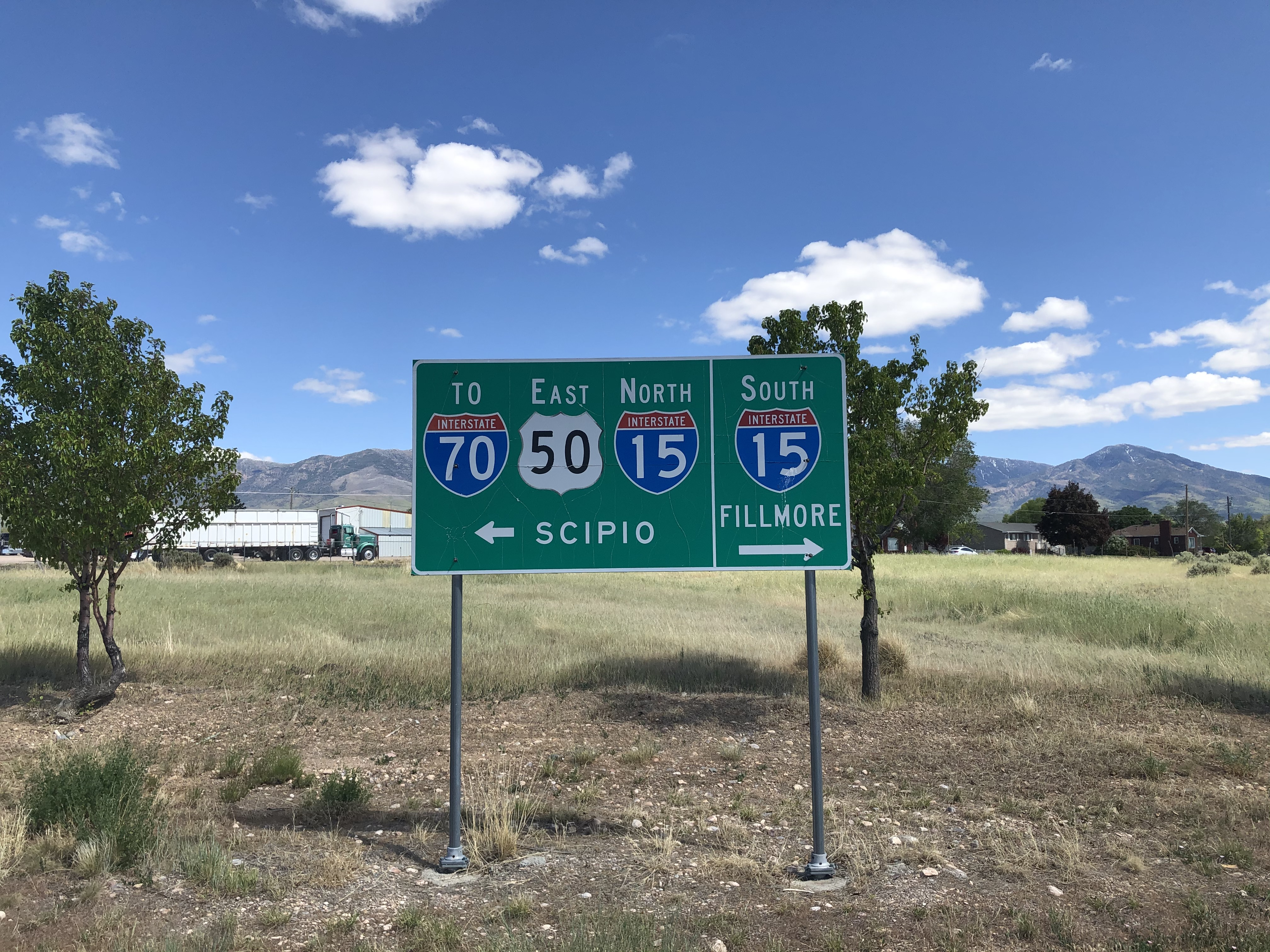
Signage at the T-intersection in Holden. This is the northern end of SR64, but the BGS simply points the way to Interstate 15 (May 2020)

== History ==
Holden's Main Street became a state highway in 1910 as part of the main road south-southwesterly from Salt Lake City. It was numbered as part of SR-1 and US-91 in the 1920s. In 1969, with the construction of I-15 imminent, State Route 26 (now US-50), which had ended at SR-1 just north of Holden, was extended both north and south from its eastern end to meet I-15 on both sides of the bypass. The state legislature redesignated the southern half as SR-64 in 1975, about a year before I-15 was completed in the area.

== Major intersections ==
The entire route is in Millard County.

Location	mi	km	Destinations	Notes
	0.000– 0.136	0.000– 0.219	I-15 – Fillmore, Salt Lake City	Southern terminus
Holden	2.015	3.243	US 50 – Delta, Scipio	Northern terminus
1.000 mi = 1.609 km; 1.000 km = 0.621 mi
