= East Carbon City, Utah =

City in Carbon County, Utah United States

East Carbon City, Utah East Carbon-Sunnyside (2014-2016)
- city
- Location in Carbon County and the state of Utah

- Location of Utah in the United States
- Coordinates: 39°31′40″N 110°25′08″W
- Country: United States
- State: Utah
- County: Carbon
- Incorporated: January 1, 2014
- Elevation: 6,090 ft (1,860 m)
- Time zone: UTC-7 (Mountain (MST))
  - Summer (DST): UTC-6 (MDT)
- ZIP code: 84520
- ZIP code: 84539
- Area code: 435
- GNIS feature ID: 2410386
- Website: eastcarboncity.org

East Carbon City is a city in Carbon County, Utah, United States, that was incorporated on January 1, 2014 as East Carbon-Sunnyside, from the merger of the cities of East Carbon and Sunnyside. East Carbon-Sunnyside was a temporary name, to be used until the city council could adopt a permanent name. As of January 1, 2016 the merged cities are officially known as East Carbon City, encompassing the subdivisions of Columbia, Dragerton and Sunnyside.

== Demographics ==
Historical population
Census	Pop.	Note	%±
2010	1,678		—
2020	1,556		−7.3%
U.S. Decennial Census

As of the 2010 census, East Carbon had a population of 1,301, while Sunnyside had a population of 377, for a combined population of 1,678. In 2018 East Carbon-Sunnyside had an estimated population of 1,475.

== See also ==
- List of municipalities in Utah
