= Kingston, Utah =

- Town
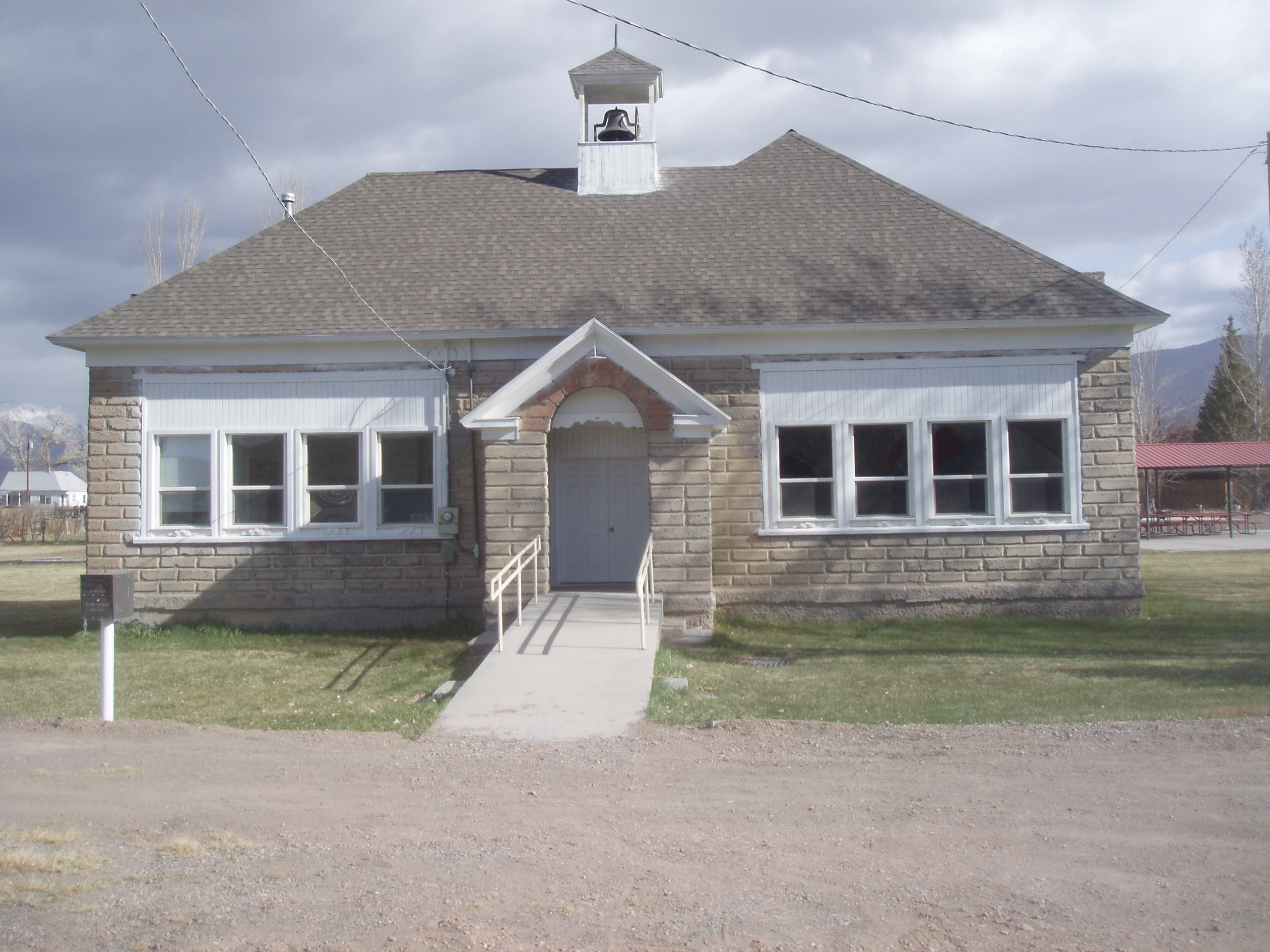
- Kingston town office

- Location in Piute County and the state of Utah.
- Coordinates: 38°12′27″N 112°11′12″W
- Country: United States
- State: Utah
- County: Piute
- Settled: 1876
- Incorporated: 1935
- Founder: Thomas R. King

Area
  - Total: 5.40 sq mi (13.99 km^{2})
  - Land: 5.40 sq mi (13.99 km^{2})
  - Water: 0 sq mi (0.00 km^{2})
- Elevation: 6,017 ft (1,834 m)

Population (2020)
  - Total: 135
  - Density: 28.7/sq mi (11.08/km^{2})
- Time zone: UTC-7 (Mountain (MST))
  - Summer (DST): UTC-6 (MDT)
- ZIP code: 84743
- Area code: 435
- FIPS code: 49-41350
- GNIS feature ID: 1442334

Kingston is a town in Piute County, Utah, United States. The population was 135 at the 2020 census.

== Geography ==
According to the United States Census Bureau, the town has a total area of 5.3 square miles (13.8 km^{2}), all land.

=== Climate ===
This climatic region is typified by large seasonal temperature differences, with warm to hot (and often humid) summers and cold (sometimes severely cold) winters. According to the Köppen Climate Classification system, Kingston has a humid continental climate, abbreviated "Dfb" on climate maps.

== History ==
Kingston is named for Thomas Rice King, who moved from Fillmore to Piute County with his five sons and their families specifically to find a place where they could establish a United Order. In the 1870s Brigham Young was encouraging communal living in United Order communities. The King families' United Order functioned from 1876 to 1883. Kingston became an incorporated town in 1935.

The members of the United Order built the village of Kingston on ten acres of land east of Circleville.

"The town consisted of a central community building for school, dances, church and other meetings. A blacksmith shop, milk house, bakery, tailor shop, post office, carpenter shop and store surrounded the meetinghouse. Homes built in like style formed a fort around a ten-acre block. These first log houses had dirt floors and roofs. A communal kitchen and dining hall about seventy feet long stood in the center, with a large vegetable garden close by."

Just east of Kingston the community had their industrial center in which buildings such as a flour mill, tannery, sawmill, and woolen mill were located. Isaac Riddle had previously built a burr mill in the area, however, it could not meet the needs of the people and so they built a gristmill at the mouth of Kingston Canyon. The community also operated a dairy about 20 miles from Kingston near present-day Antimony.

== Demographics ==
Historical population
Census	Pop.	Note	%±
1900	169		—
1910	172		1.8%
1920	164		−4.7%
1930	240		46.3%
1940	63		−73.7%
1950	138		119.0%
1960	143		3.6%
1970	114		−20.3%
1980	146		28.1%
1990	134		−8.2%
2000	142		6.0%
2010	173		21.8%
2020	135		−22.0%
U.S. Decennial Census

As of the census of 2000, there were 142 people, 47 households, and 38 families residing in the town. The population density was 26.7 people per square mile (10.3/km^{2}). There were 59 housing units at an average density of 11.1 per square mile (4.3/km^{2}). The racial makeup of the town was 98.59% White, 0.70% from other races, and 0.70% from two or more races. Hispanic or Latino of any race were 0.70% of the population.

There were 47 households, out of which 31.9% had children under the age of 18 living with them, 80.9% were married couples living together, and 19.1% were non-families. 19.1% of all households were made up of individuals, and 2.1% had someone living alone who was 65 years of age or older. The average household size was 3.02 and the average family size was 3.50.

In the town, the population was spread out, with 29.6% under the age of 18, 6.3% from 18 to 24, 22.5% from 25 to 44, 26.1% from 45 to 64, and 15.5% who were 65 years of age or older. The median age was 35 years. For every 100 females, there were 108.8 males. For every 100 females age 18 and over, there were 112.8 males.

The median income for a household in the town was $23,750, and the median income for a family was $27,083. Males had a median income of $16,667 versus $16,750 for females. The per capita income for the town was $12,492. There were 22.0% of families and 32.8% of the population living below the poverty line, including 51.4% of under eighteens and none of those over 64.

== See also ==
- List of cities and towns in Utah
