= East Carbon, Utah =

Former city in Carbon County, Utah, United States

- City
- Location in Carbon County and the state of Utah.

- Location of Utah in the United States
- Coordinates: 39°32′33″N 110°25′8″W
- Country: United States
- State: Utah
- County: Carbon
- Incorporated: July 23, 1973
- Merged with Sunnyside: January 1, 2014

Government
  - Type: Council-manager
  - Mayor: David Avery

Area
  - Total: 11.30 sq mi (29.26 km^{2})
  - Land: 11.29 sq mi (29.25 km^{2})
  - Water: 0.0077 sq mi (0.02 km^{2})
- Elevation: 5,987 ft (1,825 m)

Population (2020)
  - Total: 1,556
  - Density: 140.3/sq mi (54.16/km^{2})
- Time zone: UTC-7 (Mountain (MST))
  - Summer (DST): UTC-6 (MDT)
- ZIP code: 84520
- Area code: 435
- FIPS code: 49-20890
- GNIS feature ID: 2410386
- Website: https://eastcarboncity.org

East Carbon is a city in Carbon County, Utah, United States. The population was 1,567 as of 2022. East Carbon was incorporated on July 23, 1973, from the merger of the two struggling mining towns of Dragerton and Columbia. On January 1, 2014, the city merged with the neighboring city of Sunnyside to become East Carbon-Sunnyside, but later changed to East Carbon City.

== Geography ==
East Carbon was located southeast of the center of Carbon County at 39°32′33″N 110°25′08″W (39.542569, -110.418934). It is 23 miles (37 km) east of Price, the county seat.

According to the United States Census Bureau, the city had a total area of 9.0 square miles (23.2 km^{2}), of which 0.01 square miles (0.02 km^{2}), or 0.07%, was water.

== Demographics ==
Historical population
Census	Pop.	Note	%±
1980	1,942		—
1990	1,270		−34.6%
2000	1,393		9.7%
2010	1,301		−6.6%
2020	1,556		19.6%

=== 2020 census ===
As of the 2020 census, East Carbon had a population of 1,556. The median age was 44.5 years. 24.6% of residents were under the age of 18 and 24.0% of residents were 65 years of age or older. For every 100 females there were 104.5 males, and for every 100 females age 18 and over there were 100.9 males age 18 and over.

0.0% of residents lived in urban areas, while 100.0% lived in rural areas.

There were 639 households in East Carbon, of which 28.3% had children under the age of 18 living in them. Of all households, 45.1% were married-couple households, 22.2% were households with a male householder and no spouse or partner present, and 26.1% were households with a female householder and no spouse or partner present. About 33.1% of all households were made up of individuals and 18.2% had someone living alone who was 65 years of age or older.

There were 837 housing units, of which 23.7% were vacant. The homeowner vacancy rate was 3.8% and the rental vacancy rate was 12.6%.

Racial composition as of the 2020 census
Race	Number	Percent
White	1,304	83.8%
Black or African American	1	0.1%
American Indian and Alaska Native	19	1.2%
Asian	2	0.1%
Native Hawaiian and Other Pacific Islander	0	0.0%
Some other race	77	4.9%
Two or more races	153	9.8%
Hispanic or Latino (of any race)	286	18.4%

=== 2000 census ===
At the 2000 census, there were 1,393 people, 562 households and 384 families residing in the city. The population density was 156.0 per square mile (60.2/km^{2}). There were 734 housing units at an average density of 82.2 per square mile (31.7/km^{2}). The racial makeup of the city was 81.12% White, 0.14% African American, 0.65% Native American, 0.14% Asian, 15.65% from other races, and 2.30% from two or more races. Hispanic or Latino of any race were 20.82% of the population.

There were 562 households, of which 29.4% had children under 18 living with them, 50.7% were married couples living together, 13.3% had a ‘single’ female householder, and 31.5% were non-families. 27.4% of all households were made up of individuals, and 16.9% had someone living alone who was 65 years of age or older. The average household size was 2.48, and the average family size was 3.01.

26.2% of the population were under 18, 7.1% from 18 to 24, 23.0% from 25 to 44, 24.3% from 45 to 64, and 19.5% were 65 years of age or older. The median age was 41 years. For every 100 females, there were 92.1 males. For every 100 females aged 18 and over, there were 89.3 males.

The median household income was $25,313, and the median family income was $31,019. Males had a median income of $31,667 and females $21,912. The per capita income was $14,093. About 11.7% of families and 16.9% of the population were below the poverty line, including 18.6% of those under age 18 and 8.2% of those aged 65 or over.

== History ==
East Carbon City had its start in the fall of 1942 when the U.S. government – through the Defense Plant Corporation – awarded a contract to the W.E. Ryberg-Strong-Grant Corporation of Springville, Utah to develop the town at a planned cost of $5 million, to house coal miners working in the mines of the Geneva Steel mill and their families. It was originally named "Drager", after W.L. Drager, chief engineer for the Defense Plant Corporation, who was raised in Utah and later moved to Washington, D.C.

On September 9, 1942, the Post Office moved into its new building, and during the ceremonies, Postmistress Agnes Scow announced the United States Post Office Department would not allow the name of Drager. It contended that Drager was too similar to the name Draper (another Utah community) and would create confusion and delays in mail delivery. A selected group of citizens gathered in the school auditorium to discuss a new name from the proposals of "Dragerville", "Dragervale" or "Drager Town" offered by the Post Office Department. "Dragerton", a derivative of "Drager-town", was selected.

Dragerton was purchased in the spring of 1947 by the Geneva Steel Company, which had by then become a subsidiary of U.S. Steel, for $1,553,000. The former government town had now become a company town. There were 605 modern buildings.

In 1959, with the area near its peak population, the Carbon School District built a high school in the area. The school was placed on land within the Sunnyside city limits that bordered Dragerton. The land was donated by Kaiser Steel, a local mining company. In 1958, during an assembly at East Carbon Junior High School, a vote was taken to give the new high school a name and mascot. The name selected was East Carbon High School, and the mascot was a Viking. The school colors were blue, white and red.

When the town was incorporated in 1973, the name was officially changed to "East Carbon City", matching the high school name.

In 2005, the high school was closed and demolished before the beginning of the new school year. Bruin Point Elementary School was built the following year and is the only school serving the area of East Carbon.

== Columbia ==
As part of East Carbon's incorporation, the nearby town of Columbia (approximately 4 miles to the southeast) became part of the new city. However, the area is still referred to as "Columbia" by residents.

== See also ==
- List of municipalities in Utah
