= Burrville, Utah =

Unincorporated community in the state of Utah, United States

Burrville
- Unincorporated community
- Location within Utah Location within the United States
- Coordinates: 38°34′15″N 111°51′49″W
- Country: United States
- State: Utah
- County: Sevier
- Settled: 1876
- Founder: Charles C. Burr
- Elevation: 7,011 ft (2,137 m)
- Time zone: UTC-7 (Mountain (MST))
  - Summer (DST): UTC-6 (MDT)
- ZIP code: 84701
- Area code: 435
- GNIS feature ID: 1439380

Historical population
Census	Pop.	Note	%±
1880	203		—
1890	226		11.3%
1900	244		8.0%
1910	98		−59.8%
1920	89		−9.2%
1930	63		−29.2%
1940	47		−25.4%
1950	35		−25.5%
Source: U.S. Census Bureau

Burrville is an unincorporated community in Sevier County, Utah, United States. It was founded in 1876 by a homesteader and rancher by the name of Charles C. Burr. It is located at Plateau Junction, the junction of SR-62 and SR-24, approximately 170 miles (270 km) south of Salt Lake City. Burrville's elevation is 7,011 feet (2,137 m).

The area code is 435, and the ZIP code is 84701.
