= Piute County, Utah =

County in Utah, United States

- County
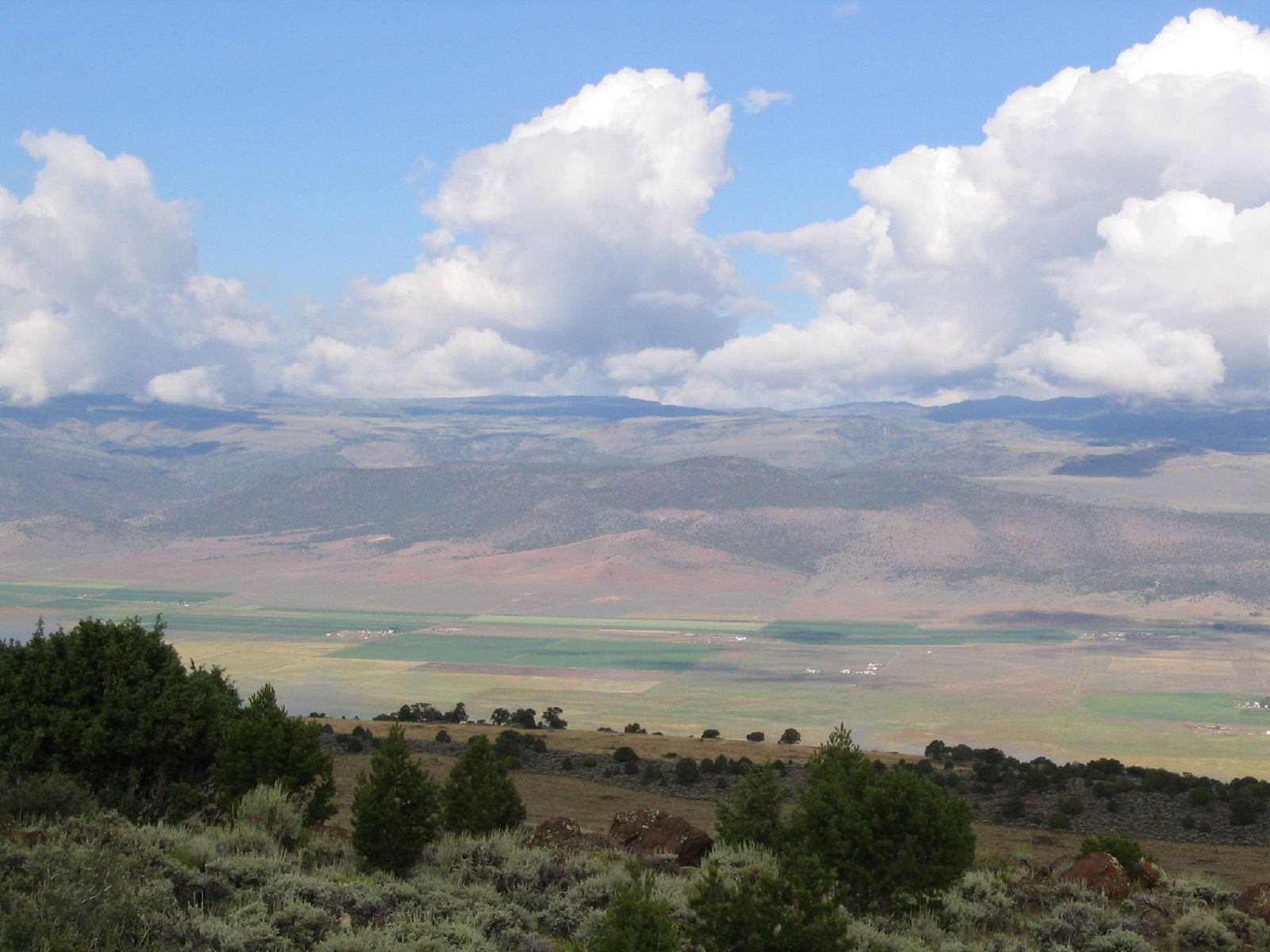
- Grass Valley and the Sevier Plateau from SR-25

- Location within the U.S. state of Utah
- Coordinates: 38°20′N 112°08′W
- Country: United States
- State: Utah
- Founded: January 16, 1865
- Named for: Paiute Native Americans
- Seat: Junction
- Largest town: Circleville

Area
  - Total: 766 sq mi (1,980 km^{2})
  - Land: 758 sq mi (1,960 km^{2})
  - Water: 7.9 sq mi (20 km^{2}) 1.0%

Population (2020)
  - Total: 1,438
  - Estimate (2025): 1,509 ▲
  - Density: 1.90/sq mi (0.732/km^{2})
- Time zone: UTC−7 (Mountain)
  - Summer (DST): UTC−6 (MDT)
- Congressional district: 2nd
- Website: piute.gov

Piute County (/ˈpaɪjuːt/ PY-yoot) is a county in south-central Utah, United States. As of the 2020 United States census, the population was 1,438, making it the second-least populous county in Utah. The county seat is Junction, and the largest town is Circleville.

== History ==
Piute County was formed on January 16, 1865, with areas annexed from Beaver County. It was named for the Paiute tribe of Native Americans. Its defined boundaries were altered by adjustments between adjoining counties in 1866, in 1880, in 1892, and in 1931. It has retained its current configuration since 1931.

By the 1860s, mining prospectors were pushing into central and southern Utah Territory, and several mining towns, such as Bullion and Webster, appeared. Mining activity had slowed by the 1900s, but gold mining (from lodes in Tushar Mountains) had produced 240,000 ounces of gold from 1868 through 1959. As the nation entered The Great War, a mine on the east Tushar Mountains producing potash and alumina became a national center of attention, both because of the strategic value of these products, and because of persistent rumors of sabotage attempts and spying. The town of Alunite flourished (1915-1930), then died as the war effort wound down. Today it is abandoned.

== Geography ==
The Sevier River flows northward through the west-central part of Piute County, joined at Kingston by the East Branch of the Sevier. Immediately north of Kingston, it is dammed to form Piute Reservoir. Two mountain ridges lie north–south across the county. The eastern ridge runs through the east-central part of the county, and the western ridge (Tushar Mountains) runs along the county's west border, its crestline defining the county line. Otter Creek flows southward through the east part of the county; it is dammed to form Otter Creek Reservoir in the SE part of the county. Along the way it is fed by Greenwich Creek and Box Creek, draining the east face of the eastern ridge. The eastern part of the county generally slopes to the south while the west-central part of the county slopes to the north. The county's highest point is Delano Peak on the Tushar Range, at 12,174 ft (3,711 m) ASL. The highest point on the eastern ridge is a crest near the county's north border, at 9.893 ft (3.015 m) ASL. The county has a total area of 766 square miles (1,980 km^{2}), of which 758 square miles (1,960 km^{2}) is land and 7.9 square miles (20 km^{2}) (1.0%) is water. It is the fifth-smallest county in Utah by total area.

=== Adjacent counties ===
- Sevier County (north)
- Wayne County (east)
- Garfield County (south)
- Beaver County (west)

=== Protected areas ===
- Dixie National Forest (part)
- Fishermans Bench Recreation Site
- Fishlake National Forest (part)
- Otter Creek State Park
- Piute State Park

=== Lakes ===
- Barney Lake
- Big Flat Reservoir
- Burnt Flat Reservoir
- Butte Reservoir
- Chicken Spring
- Clause Pond
- Dead Horse Reservoir
- Death Hollow Reservoir
- Dog Lake
- Dry Lake (southeast of Marysvale)
- Dry Lake (east of Piute Reservoir)
- Dry Wash Pond
- Durkee Reservoir
- Fish Lake Reservoir
- Forshea Reservoir
- Forshea Spring
- Forshea Spring Reservoir
- Hell Hole Reservoir
- Hidden Lake
- Little Meadows
- Little Park
- Lower Box Creek Reservoir
- Manning Meadows Reservoir
- Middle Spring Lake
- Mud Lake
- Nicks Pond
- Otter Creek Reservoir
- Parker Lake
- Pine Point Reservoir
- Pole Canyon Reservoir
- Piute Reservoir
- Rock Canyon Reservoir
- Rock Spring
- Rocky Ford Reservoir
- Smiths Reservoir
- Taylor Pond
- Tuft Reservoir
- Upper Box Creek Reservoir
- Voyles Pond
- West Cedar Grove Reservoir
- Willis Reservoir
- Wills Reservoir
- Willow Spring
- Willow Springs
- Windy Ridge Reservoir
- Wood Pond

== Demographics ==
Historical population
Census	Pop.	Note	%±
1870	82		—
1880	1,651		1,913.4%
1890	2,842		72.1%
1900	1,954		−31.2%
1910	1,734		−11.3%
1920	2,770		59.7%
1930	1,956		−29.4%
1940	2,203		12.6%
1950	1,911		−13.3%
1960	1,436		−24.9%
1970	1,164		−18.9%
1980	1,329		14.2%
1990	1,277		−3.9%
2000	1,435		12.4%
2010	1,556		8.4%
2020	1,438		−7.6%
2025 (est.)	1,509	▲	4.9%
US Decennial Census; 1790–1960 1900–1990; 1990–2000 2010 2020

=== 2020 census ===
According to the 2020 United States census and 2020 American Community Survey, there were 1,438 people in Piute County with a population density of 1.9 people per square mile (0.7/km^{2}). Among non-Hispanic or Latino people, the racial makeup was 1,276 (88.7%) White, 0 (0.0%) African American, 4 (0.3%) Native American, 0 (0.0%) Asian, 0 (0.0%) Pacific Islander, 1 (0.1%) from other races, and 33 (2.3%) from two or more races. 124 (8.6%) people were Hispanic or Latino.

Piute County, Utah – Racial and ethnic composition Note: the US Census treats Hispanic/Latino as an ethnic category. This table excludes Latinos from the racial categories and assigns them to a separate category. Hispanics/Latinos may be of any race.
Race / Ethnicity (NH = Non-Hispanic)	Pop 2000	Pop 2010	Pop 2020	% 2000	% 2010	% 2020
White alone (NH)	1,339	1,419	1,276	93.31%	91.19%	88.73%
Black or African American alone (NH)	2	2	0	0.14%	0.13%	0.00%
Native American or Alaska Native alone (NH)	13	5	4	0.91%	0.32%	0.28%
Asian alone (NH)	3	6	0	0.21%	0.39%	0.00%
Pacific Islander alone (NH)	1	2	0	0.07%	0.13%	0.00%
Other race alone (NH)	1	0	1	0.07%	0.00%	0.07%
Mixed race or Multiracial (NH)	12	13	33	0.84%	0.84%	2.29%
Hispanic or Latino (any race)	64	109	124	4.46%	7.00%	8.62%
Total	1,435	1,556	1,438	100.00%	100.00%	100.00%

There were 715 (49.72%) males and 723 (50.28%) females, and the population distribution by age was 346 (24.1%) under the age of 18, 705 (49.0%) from 18 to 64, and 387 (26.9%) who were at least 65 years old. The median age was 44.7 years.

There were 536 households in Piute County with an average size of 2.68 of which 397 (74.1%) were families and 139 (25.9%) were non-families. Among all families, 331 (61.8%) were married couples, 36 (6.7%) were male householders with no spouse, and 30 (5.6%) were female householders with no spouse. Among all non-families, 118 (22.0%) were a single person living alone and 21 (3.9%) were two or more people living together. 165 (30.8%) of all households had children under the age of 18. 445 (83.0%) of households were owner-occupied while 91 (17.0%) were renter-occupied.

The median income for a Piute County household was $29,125 and the median family income was $42,500, with a per-capita income of $18,148. The median income for males that were full-time employees was $46,652 and for females $31,600. 19.1% of the population and 12.9% of families were below the poverty line.

In terms of education attainment, out of the 1,328 people in Piute County 25 years or older, 97 (7.3%) had not completed high school, 405 (30.5%) had a high school diploma or equivalency, 539 (40.6%) had some college or associate degree, 218 (16.4%) had a bachelor's degree, and 69 (5.2%) had a graduate or professional degree.

== Politics and government ==
Piute County is a traditional Republican stronghold. In no national election since 1940 has the county selected the Democratic Party candidate (as of 2024).

State elected offices
Position	District	Name	Affiliation	First elected
Senate	24	Derrin Owens	Republican	2020
House of Representatives	73	Phil Lyman	Republican	2018
Board of Education	14	Mark Huntsman	Nonpartisan	2014

United States presidential election results for Piute County, Utah
Year	Republican		Democratic		Third party(ies)	
Year	No.	%	No.	%	No.	%
1896	34	5.77%	555	94.23%	0	0.00%
1900	330	53.75%	280	45.60%	4	0.65%
1904	358	48.12%	228	30.65%	158	21.24%
1908	333	56.54%	157	26.66%	99	16.81%
1912	205	37.41%	110	20.07%	233	42.52%
1916	269	36.25%	417	56.20%	56	7.55%
1920	538	63.82%	283	33.57%	22	2.61%
1924	398	61.42%	208	32.10%	42	6.48%
1928	434	64.20%	237	35.06%	5	0.74%
1932	433	50.70%	403	47.19%	18	2.11%
1936	339	35.65%	611	64.25%	1	0.11%
1940	442	48.57%	466	51.21%	2	0.22%
1944	381	52.41%	346	47.59%	0	0.00%
1948	440	57.67%	315	41.28%	8	1.05%
1952	531	71.95%	207	28.05%	0	0.00%
1956	548	75.27%	180	24.73%	0	0.00%
1960	453	64.71%	247	35.29%	0	0.00%
1964	361	56.94%	273	43.06%	0	0.00%
1968	411	64.42%	167	26.18%	60	9.40%
1972	475	78.77%	102	16.92%	26	4.31%
1976	377	55.85%	265	39.26%	33	4.89%
1980	551	76.63%	157	21.84%	11	1.53%
1984	606	80.05%	151	19.95%	0	0.00%
1988	476	69.29%	206	29.99%	5	0.73%
1992	429	56.97%	169	22.44%	155	20.58%
1996	475	66.25%	176	24.55%	66	9.21%
2000	626	80.15%	133	17.03%	22	2.82%
2004	646	83.57%	123	15.91%	4	0.52%
2008	635	79.28%	141	17.60%	25	3.12%
2012	697	89.13%	74	9.46%	11	1.41%
2016	626	85.75%	47	6.44%	57	7.81%
2020	773	88.75%	86	9.87%	12	1.38%
2024	854	88.68%	94	9.76%	15	1.56%

Map of Piute County communities

== Communities ==
=== Towns ===
- Circleville
- Junction (county seat)
- Kingston
- Marysvale

=== Unincorporated communities ===
- Angle
- Greenwich
- Thompsonville

=== Former communities ===
- Alunite
- Bullion Falls
- Kimberly
- Virginia
- Webster

== Education ==
The school district of the county is Piute School District.

== See also ==
- List of counties in Utah
- National Register of Historic Places listings in Piute County, Utah
