= Sunnyside, Utah =

- Former city
- Location in Carbon County and the state of Utah.

- Location of Utah in the United States
- Coordinates: 39°33′8″N 110°24′3″W
- Country: United States
- State: Utah
- County: Carbon
- Settled: 1879

Area
  - Total: 3.1 sq mi (8.1 km^{2})
  - Land: 3.1 sq mi (8.1 km^{2})
  - Water: 0 sq mi (0.0 km^{2})
- Elevation: 6,414 ft (1,955 m)

Population (2010)
  - Total: 377
  - Density: 120/sq mi (46.5/km^{2})
- Time zone: UTC-7 (Mountain (MST))
  - Summer (DST): UTC-6 (MDT)
- ZIP code: 84539
- Area code: 435
- FIPS code: 49-74370
- GNIS feature ID: 2412007

Sunnyside is a former city in Carbon County, Utah, United States. The population was 377 at the 2010 census. On January 1, 2014, the city merged with the neighboring city of East Carbon.

== Geography ==
Sunnyside is located southeast of the center of Carbon County and is east of East Carbon. Price, the county seat, is 26 miles (42 km) to the west. Before its merger with East Carbon, Sunnyside had a total area of 3.1 square miles (8.1 km^{2}), all of it land.

=== Climate ===
According to the Köppen Climate Classification system, Sunnyside has a semi-arid climate, abbreviated "BSk" on climate maps.

== Demographics ==
Historical population
Census	Pop.	Note	%±
1900	240		—
1910	1,811		654.6%
1920	2,072		14.4%
1930	749		−63.9%
1940	434		−42.1%
1950	1,881		333.4%
1960	1,740		−7.5%
1970	485		−72.1%
1980	611		26.0%
1990	339		−44.5%
2000	404		19.2%
2010	377		−6.7%
2018 (est.)	374		−0.8%

As of the 2000 census, there were 404 people, 160 households, and 104 families residing in the city. The population density was 128.6 people per square mile (49.7/km²). There were 183 housing units, with an average density of 58.3 per square mile (22.5/km²). The racial makeup of the city was 90.84% White, 0.50% African American, 6.93% from other races, and 1.73% from two or more races. Hispanic or Latino of any race were 20.30% of the population.

There were 160 households, of which 28.8% had children under the age of 18 living with them, 58.1% were married couples living together, 3.8% had a female householder with no husband present, and 34.4% were non-families. 30.0% of all households were made up of individuals (single person) and 16.9% had someone living alone who was 65 years of age or older. The average household size was 2.53 and the average family size was 3.20.

In the city, the population was spread out, with 26.7% under the age of 18, 7.2% aged 18 to 24, 24.3% aged 25 to 44, 24.0% aged 45 to 64, and 17.8% who were 65 years of age or older. The median age was 40 years. For every 100 females, there were 83.6 males. For every 100 females age 18 and over, there were 87.3 males.

The median income for a household in the city was $32,955. The median income for a family was $36,875. Males had a median income of $39,688 versus $18,333 for females. The per capita income for the city was $13,752. About 12.8% of families and 14.7% of the population were below the poverty line, including 14.2% of those under age 18 and 16.4% of those age 65 or over.

== History ==
The area known as Sunnyside was founded in 1879, when George and James Whitmore arrived at the base of the Book Cliffs and established the Whitmore Cattle Ranch. In 1883, the Denver and Rio Grande Western Railroad (D&RGW) extended its line from the railhead at Deseret to Price. Along this 60-mile (97 km) stretch two additional railheads were added, one at Woodside, and another 20 miles (32 km) north at Sunnyside, named for its location on the sunny side of the Book Cliffs.

For over a century, Sunnyside was the leader in coal production in Carbon County. The history of coal mining in Sunnyside began shortly after Jefferson Tidwell and his three sons discovered coal in Whitmore Canyon in 1896. By 1898, the Pleasant Valley Coal Company had acquired the rights to the coal from Tidwell. On July 4 of that year, the Sunnyside railhead was abandoned by the D&RGW, and the coal camp located in Whitmore Canyon was named Sunnyside. By 1901, the D&RGW and its subsidiary, Utah Fuel Coal Company, acquired the operation.

Sunnyside was officially incorporated as a town in 1916, with a mayor and four trustees.

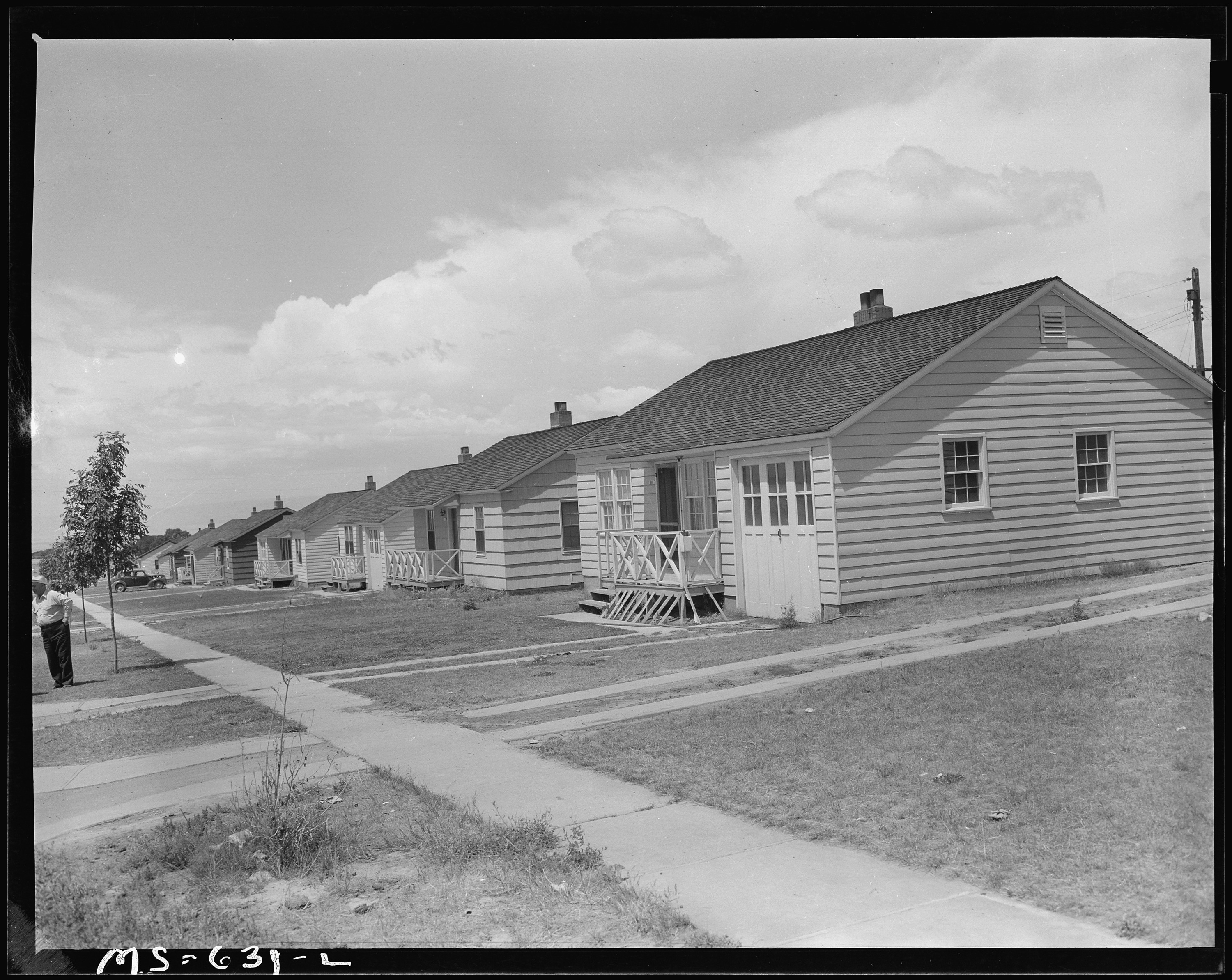
July 1946 photographs of government-built homes in Sunnyside

For fifty years, Utah Fuel operated the coal mines in Sunnyside, selling its interest to Kaiser Steel Corporation in 1949. The financial investments of these companies turned Tidwell's mining operation into a major coal industry, inextricably tied to Sunnyside.

Until 1994, the Sunnyside's mayor was not an elected official. Instead, the office was held by the Superintendent of Mines for Utah Fuel, then later by Kaiser Steel Corporation when it took over in 1950.

== Education ==
Sunnyside is located in the Carbon School District. It has one elementary school, which also accommodates students from East Carbon City. Students attend middle and high school in Price.
