= Otter Creek Reservoir =

Reservoir in Utah, United States

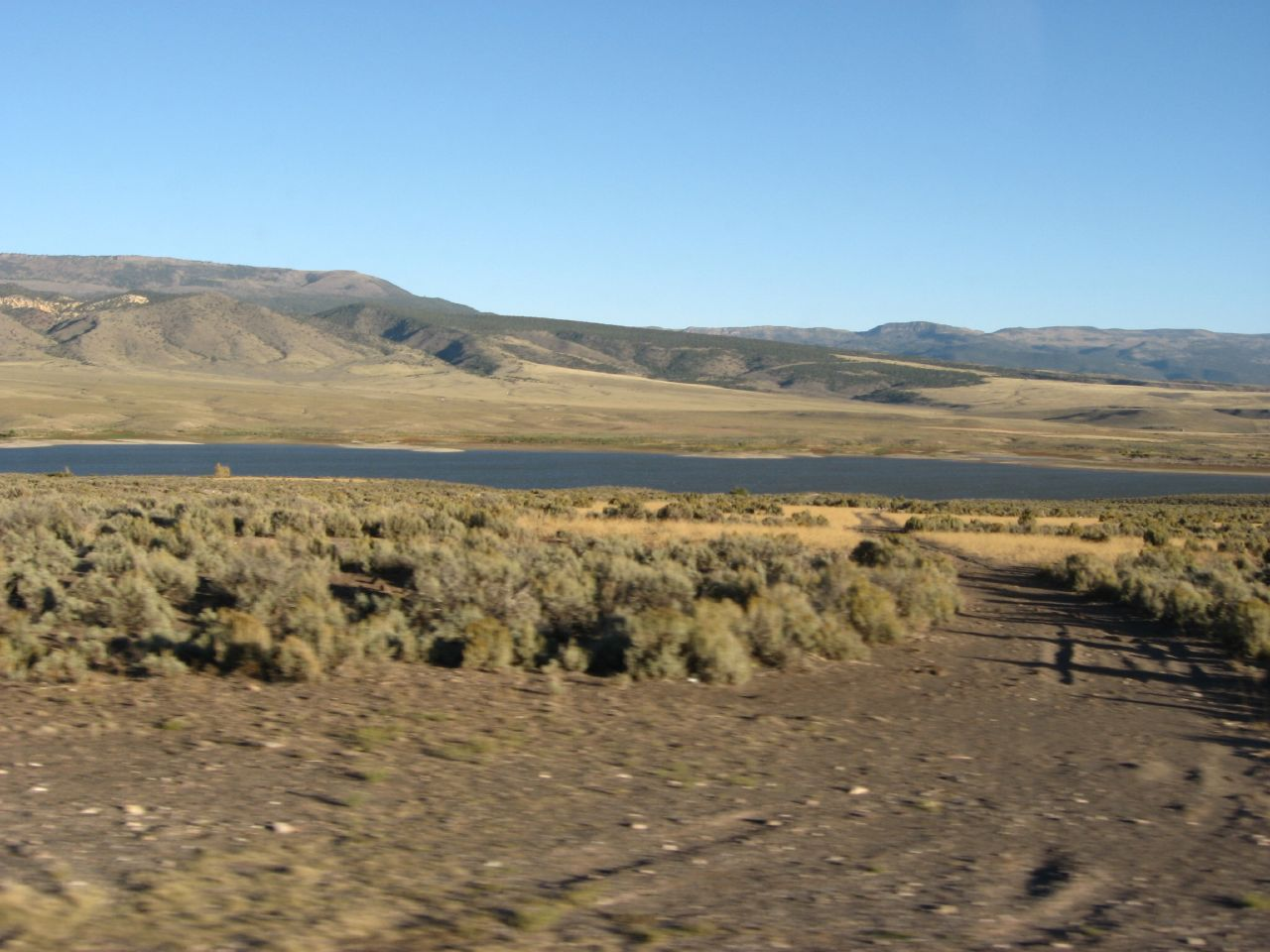
- Otter Creek Reservoir, September 2007

- Location within Utah Location within the United States
- Location: Piute County, Utah, United States
- Coordinates: 38°10′10″N 112°01′21″W
- Basin countries: United States
- Max. length: 6.5 mi (10.5 km)
- Max. width: 3,854 ft (1,175 m)
- Surface area: 2,520 acres (1,020 ha)
- Average depth: 37 ft (11 m)
- Max. depth: 37 ft (11 m)
- Water volume: 52,495 acre⋅ft (64,752,000 m^{3})
- Shore length^{1}: 16.9 mi (27.2 km)
- Surface elevation: 6,372 ft (1,942 m)
- Website: Official website
- ^{1} Shore length is not a well-defined measure.

Otter Creek Reservoir is a reservoir (elevation approximately 6,372 ft or 1,940 m) located in southeastern Piute County Utah, United States.

== Description ==
The reservoir is a popular location for rainbow trout fishing.

The valley is situated in the southern end of the Grass Valley and the nearest town is Antimony, approximately 12 to 15 miles (19 to 24 km). A larger city within a one-hour drive is Richfield.

== See also ==
- List of dams and reservoirs in Utah
