= Koosharem, Utah =

Town in the state of Utah, United States

- Town
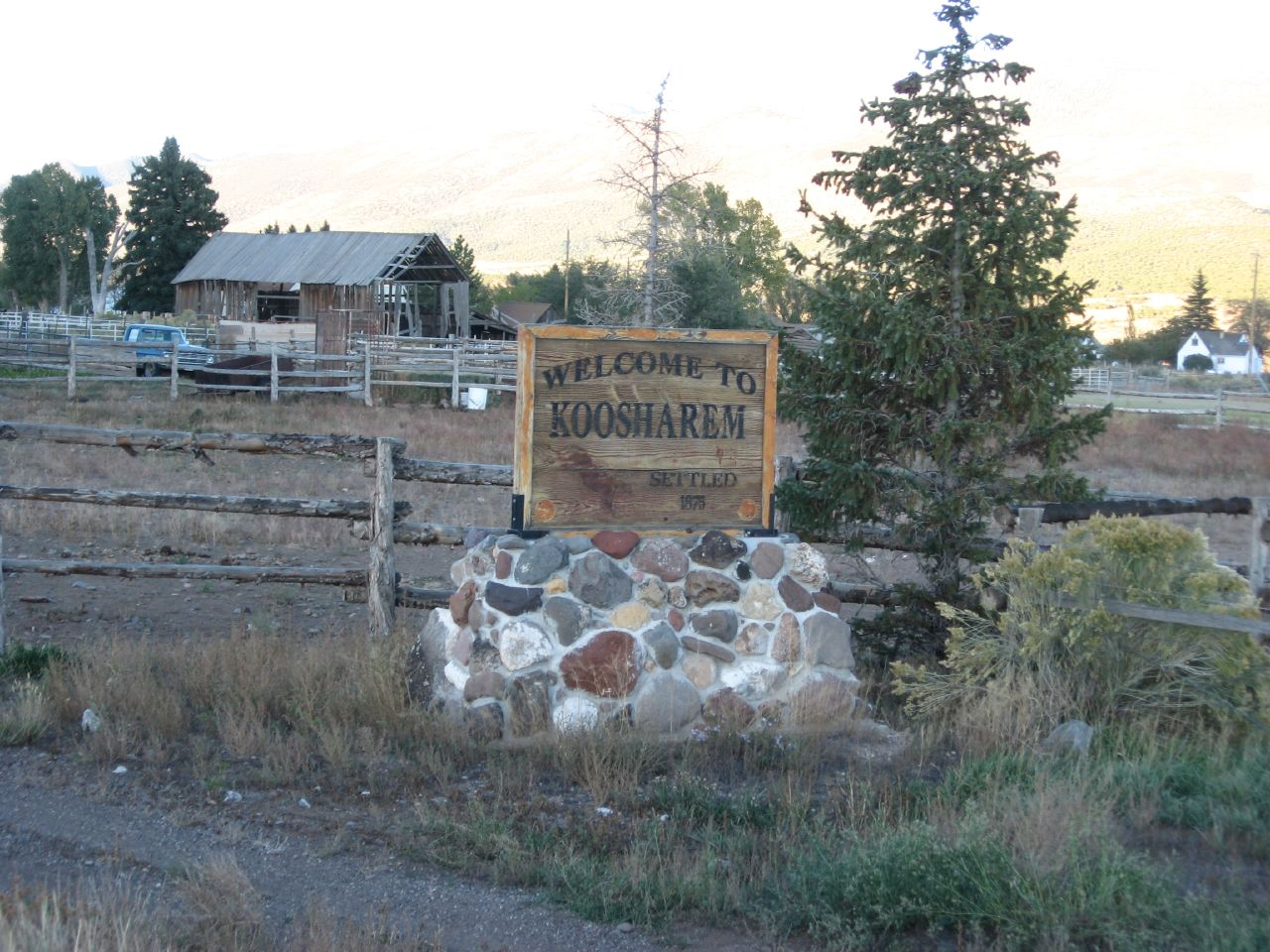
- Welcome sign in Koosharem, September 2007

- Location in Sevier County and the state of Utah.
- Coordinates: 38°30′39″N 111°52′57″W
- Country: United States
- State: Utah
- County: Sevier
- Settled: 1877
- Named for: Native American word for the valley named after the deep red clover indigenous to the area.

Area
  - Total: 0.83 sq mi (2.16 km^{2})
  - Land: 0.83 sq mi (2.16 km^{2})
  - Water: 0 sq mi (0.00 km^{2})
- Elevation: 6,919 ft (2,109 m)

Population (2020)
  - Total: 244
  - Density: 396.2/sq mi (152.96/km^{2})
- Time zone: UTC-7 (Mountain (MST))
  - Summer (DST): UTC-6 (MDT)
- ZIP code: 84744
- Area code: 435
- FIPS code: 49-41680
- GNIS feature ID: 1442357
- Website: koosharem.us

Koosharem is a town in Sevier County, Utah, United States. Koosharem is also known as "Grass Valley". It generally comprises the area known as Burrville, Utah on the north, south through the valley and through the town of Koosharem and down to the south end with the town of Greenwich, Utah. The valley is made up of private lands nestled within the Fishlake National Forest. Koosharem is situated at the cross-roads for travelers going between Capitol Reef National Park and Bryce Canyon National Park and/or Zion National Park. Koosharem is also the closest town to the famous Fish Lake. The town also serves as an important point along the many trails of the Piute ATV Trail System.

Koosharem's only store, the historic Grass Valley Mercantile, shares this secondary naming reference.

The name of the town Koosharem originates from the Native Americans indigenous to the area, the Piute Indians and their term for the valley named for the deep red clover that grows in the lush meadows of the Koosharem Valley. The population was 244 at the 2020 census.

== Geography ==
According to the United States Census Bureau, the town has a total area of 0.6 square miles (1.5 km^{2}), all land. A 2008 annexation increased the population to an official estimate of 400.

Koosharem has one church, a cemetery, baseball diamond, fire station, a dairy, a motel, two restaurants, and a store (post office located inside that store).

Koosharem is rural and isolated but relatively centrally located. The table shows driving miles from the center of Koosharem to the following:

Destination	Road Miles
Bryce Canyon National Park	70
Fish Lake, Sevier County	15
Zion National Park	133
Richfield, Utah	29
Sigurd, Utah	28
Salt Lake City, Utah (Airport)	185
Las Vegas, Nevada (Airport)	292
Moab, Utah	195
Grand Junction, Colorado	244

Koosharem and the Grass Valley include habitat for threatened and endangered species. These species include the Greater Sage Grouse, the Utah Prairie Dog, Pygmy Rabbit, bald eagles, golden eagles, western toads, and ferruginous hawks.

=== Climate ===
Koosharem has a cold semi-arid climate (Köppen BSk).

Climate data for Koosharem, Utah, 1991–2020 normals, 1893-2020 extremes: 6930ft (2112m)
Month	Jan	Feb	Mar	Apr	May	Jun	Jul	Aug	Sep	Oct	Nov	Dec	Year
Record high °F (°C)	64 (18)	69 (21)	77 (25)	79 (26)	91 (33)	96 (36)	98 (37)	98 (37)	92 (33)	90 (32)	78 (26)	63 (17)	98 (37)
Mean maximum °F (°C)	51.8 (11.0)	55.5 (13.1)	65.1 (18.4)	72.9 (22.7)	81.8 (27.7)	87.6 (30.9)	92.4 (33.6)	89.1 (31.7)	83.8 (28.8)	77.5 (25.3)	64.4 (18.0)	54.4 (12.4)	91.3 (32.9)
Mean daily maximum °F (°C)	38.7 (3.7)	43.0 (6.1)	51.7 (10.9)	59.1 (15.1)	68.6 (20.3)	79.6 (26.4)	84.9 (29.4)	81.8 (27.7)	74.8 (23.8)	62.5 (16.9)	50.7 (10.4)	39.4 (4.1)	61.2 (16.2)
Daily mean °F (°C)	25.3 (−3.7)	29.3 (−1.5)	36.5 (2.5)	42.9 (6.1)	50.5 (10.3)	60.3 (15.7)	66.4 (19.1)	64.2 (17.9)	56.9 (13.8)	45.3 (7.4)	34.8 (1.6)	25.0 (−3.9)	44.8 (7.1)
Mean daily minimum °F (°C)	11.9 (−11.2)	15.6 (−9.1)	21.4 (−5.9)	26.7 (−2.9)	32.4 (0.2)	41.1 (5.1)	47.9 (8.8)	46.6 (8.1)	39.0 (3.9)	28.2 (−2.1)	18.9 (−7.3)	10.7 (−11.8)	28.4 (−2.0)
Mean minimum °F (°C)	−9.1 (−22.8)	−1.5 (−18.6)	5.7 (−14.6)	14.3 (−9.8)	21.4 (−5.9)	29.4 (−1.4)	37.4 (3.0)	37.3 (2.9)	25.4 (−3.7)	14.9 (−9.5)	2.0 (−16.7)	−7.0 (−21.7)	−11.6 (−24.2)
Record low °F (°C)	−28 (−33)	−24 (−31)	−13 (−25)	0 (−18)	12 (−11)	18 (−8)	27 (−3)	26 (−3)	11 (−12)	−6 (−21)	−17 (−27)	−32 (−36)	−32 (−36)
Average precipitation inches (mm)	0.70 (18)	0.48 (12)	0.72 (18)	0.59 (15)	0.88 (22)	0.55 (14)	1.29 (33)	1.37 (35)	1.14 (29)	1.16 (29)	0.56 (14)	0.65 (17)	10.09 (256)
Average snowfall inches (cm)	7.30 (18.5)	5.90 (15.0)	6.40 (16.3)	2.20 (5.6)	1.00 (2.5)	0.20 (0.51)	0.00 (0.00)	0.00 (0.00)	0.10 (0.25)	1.90 (4.8)	4.80 (12.2)	8.30 (21.1)	38.1 (96.76)
Source 1: NOAA (1981-2010 snowfall)
Source 2: XMACIS2 (records & monthly max/mins)

== Economy ==
Koosharem's economy is based on a combination of traditional agriculture and growing tourism-related industries.

Agriculture. Farming and ranching remain significant economic activities in the area, utilizing the local land for crop cultivation and livestock raising.

Tourism and Recreation. The town's location near natural attractions has led to the development of tourism-based businesses:

1. Fishlake National Forest and the Paiute ATV Trail attract outdoor enthusiasts.
2. Proximity to national parks brings in visitors.
3. The area is known for hunting, particularly elk. In 2008, the world record "Spider Bull" Elk was harvested near Koosharem.
4. Local businesses offer ATV rentals for trail exploration.

Local Businesses. The town center includes:

1. Koosharem Mercantile (locally known as "the Merc"), a general store serving as a community hub.
2. Two restaurants: Red Clover Cafe and Koosharem Cafe.

Other Economic Contributors

1. Sorenson's Ranch School for troubled youth provides employment opportunities.
2. Guiding services for hunters and tourists.

Koosharem's economy continues to evolve, balancing its agricultural roots with an expanding service sector catering to both residents and visitors. riders, and sight seers.

== Demographics ==
Historical population
Census	Pop.	Note	%±
1890	232		—
1900	400		72.4%
1910	287		−28.2%
1920	373		30.0%
1930	319		−14.5%
1940	375		17.6%
1950	300		−20.0%
1960	148		−50.7%
1970	141		−4.7%
1980	183		29.8%
1990	266		45.4%
2000	276		3.8%
2010	327		18.5%
2020	244		−25.4%
U.S. Decennial Census

As of the census of 2010, there were 327 people residing in Koosharem, an 18.48% increase from 2000. In the 2000 census, there were 276 people, 88 households, and 79 families residing in the town. The population density was 497.1 people per square mile (190.3/km^{2}). There were 133 housing units at an average density of 239.5 per square mile (91.7/km^{2}). The racial makeup of the town was 94.93% White, 1.45% Native American, 1.09% Asian, 0.36% Pacific Islander, 1.81% from other races, and 0.36% from two or more races. Hispanic or Latino of any race were 4.71% of the population.

There were 88 households, out of which 46.6% had children under the age of 18 living with them, 80.7% were married couples living together, 6.8% had a female householder with no husband present, and 9.1% were non-families. 9.1% of all households were made up of individuals, and 6.8% had someone living alone who was 65 years of age or older. The average household size was 3.14 and the average family size was 3.30.

In the town, the population was spread out, with 35.1% under the age of 18, 10.1% from 18 to 24, 22.1% from 25 to 44, 21.0% from 45 to 64, and 11.6% who were 65 years of age or older. The median age was 30 years. For every 100 females, there were 98.6 males. For every 100 females age 18 and over, there were 103.4 males.

The median income for a household in the town was $34,583, and the median income for a family was $40,625. Males had a median income of $32,500 versus $18,929 for females. The per capita income for the town was $13,481. About 5.3% of families and 8.8% of the population were below the poverty line, including 16.0% of those under the age of 18 and none of those 65 or over.

== Education ==
Koosharem is located in the Sevier School District.

- Elementary Education: Koosharem Elementary School serves the town's elementary-aged school students.
- Secondary Education: Koosharem does not have a dedicated junior high or high school. Students attend school in either:
  - Piute High School in Junction, Utah; or
  - Richfield High School in Richfield, Utah
- Transportation: School buses transport Koosharem students to both Junction and Richfield daily.

== See also ==
- List of cities and towns in Utah
