= Antimony, Utah =

Town in the state of Utah, United States

- Town
- Location in Garfield County and in the state of Utah.
- Coordinates: 38°5′45″N 111°58′23″W
- Country: United States
- State: Utah
- County: Garfield
- Settled: 1878
- Incorporated: 1934
- Named for: Antimony

Government
  - Mayor: KAYMAR WILLIS
  - Clerk: R. HENRIE

Area
  - Total: 9.82 sq mi (25.44 km^{2})
  - Land: 9.82 sq mi (25.44 km^{2})
  - Water: 0 sq mi (0.00 km^{2})
- Elevation: 6,453 ft (1,967 m)

Population (2020)
  - Total: 118
  - Estimate (2019): 121
  - Density: 12.3/sq mi (4.76/km^{2})
- Time zone: UTC-7 (MST)
  - Summer (DST): UTC-6 (MDT)
- ZIP code: 84712
- Area code: 435
- FIPS code: 49-01860
- GNIS feature ID: 1438250

Antimony is a town in Garfield County, Utah, United States. The population was 118 at the 2020 census.

== Geography ==
According to the United States Census Bureau, the town has a total area of 10.1 square miles (26 km^{2}), all land.

=== Trails ===
The American Discovery Trail runs through Antimony.

=== Climate ===
This climatic region is typified by large seasonal temperature differences, with warm to hot (and often humid) summers and cold (sometimes severely cold) winters. According to the Köppen Climate Classification system, Antimony has a humid continental climate, abbreviated "Dfb" on climate maps.

== History ==
A party of 22 men came to the Antimony area in 1873 on a mission to make peace with the local Fish Lake band of Indians. They caught several coyote pups here, and named the place Coyote. The first permanent settlement was established, under the name of Coyote, in 1878. In 1880, deposits of the antimony ore stibnite were found in Coyote Canyon, and a mining industry began. This resulted in the town's renaming, in 1921, to Antimony.

== Fireworks ==
Antimony is known throughout Central Utah for its Fourth of July fireworks display which consists of free bottle rockets and free sparklers for anyone over the age of 3. Under the direction of Mayor Shannon Allen, the town moved its annual fireworks display from the town park to the bluffs overlooking Otter Creek Reservoir.

== Demographics ==
Historical population
Census	Pop.	Note	%±
1940	245		—
1950	187		−23.7%
1960	161		−13.9%
1970	113		−29.8%
1980	94		−16.8%
1990	83		−11.7%
2000	122		47.0%
2010	122		0.0%
2020	118		−3.3%
U.S. Decennial Census

As of the census of 2010, there were 122 people, 40 households, and 32 families residing in the town. The population density was 12.1 people per square mile (4.7 people/km^{2}). There were 81 housing units at an average density of 8.0 per square mile (3.1/km^{2}). The racial makeup of the town was 96.72% White, 0.82% Native American, and 2.46% from two or more races. Hispanic or Latino of any race were 0.82% of the population.

There were 40 households, out of which 40.0% had children under the age of 18 living with them, 65.0% were married couples living together, 10.0% had a female householder with no husband present, and 20.0% were non-families. 15.0% of all households were made up of individuals, and 10.0% had someone living alone who was 65 years of age or older. The average household size was 2.95 and the average family size was 3.34.

In the town, the population was spread out, with 35.2% under the age of 18, 4.1% from 18 to 24, 23.0% from 25 to 44, 18.9% from 45 to 64, and 18.9% who were 65 years of age or older. The median age was 37 years. For every 100 females, there were 144.0 males. For every 100 females age 18 and over, there were 125.7 males.

The median income for a household in the town was $22,500, and the median income for a family was $24,000. Males had a median income of $12,250 versus $21,250 for females. The per capita income for the town was $7,939. There were 10.0% of families and 18.7% of the population living below the poverty line, including 10.4% of under eighteens and 55.6% of those over 64.
