= Junction, Utah =

Town in the state of Utah, United States

- Town
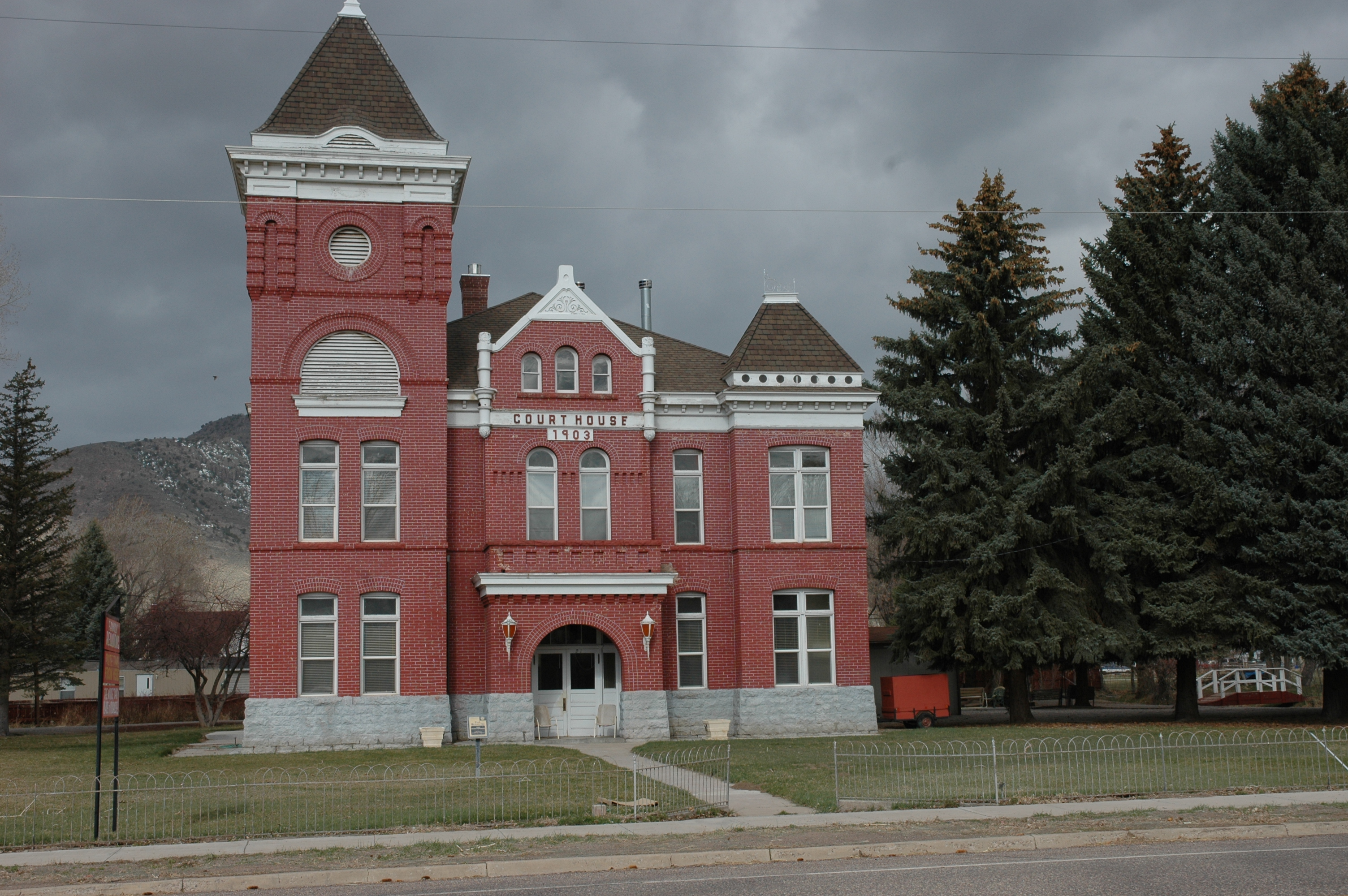
- The old Piute County courthouse

- Location in Piute County and the state of Utah.
- Coordinates: 38°14′11″N 112°13′23″W
- Country: United States
- State: Utah
- County: Piute
- Settled: 1880
- Incorporated: April 7, 1913

Area
  - Total: 13.65 sq mi (35.35 km^{2})
  - Land: 13.19 sq mi (34.17 km^{2})
  - Water: 0.46 sq mi (1.18 km^{2})
- Elevation: 6,007 ft (1,831 m)

Population (2020)
  - Total: 212
  - Density: 13.0/sq mi (5.03/km^{2})
- Time zone: UTC-7 (Mountain (MST))
  - Summer (DST): UTC-6 (MDT)
- ZIP code: 84740
- Area code: 435
- FIPS code: 49-39590
- GNIS feature ID: 1442250

Junction is a town in and the county seat of Piute County, Utah, United States. The population was 212 at the 2020 census.

== Geography ==
According to the United States Census Bureau, the town has a total area of 15.0 square miles (38.7 km^{2}), of which 14.4 square miles (37.2 km^{2}) is land and 0.6 square miles (1.5 km^{2}) (3.88%) is water.

=== Climate ===
This climatic region is typified by large seasonal temperature differences, with warm to hot (and often humid) summers and cold (sometimes severely cold) winters. According to the Köppen Climate Classification system, Junction has a humid continental climate, abbreviated "Dfb" on climate maps.

== Demographics ==
Historical population
Census	Pop.	Note	%±
1890	125		—
1900	249		99.2%
1910	423		69.9%
1920	389		−8.0%
1930	352		−9.5%
1940	393		11.6%
1950	285		−27.5%
1960	219		−23.2%
1970	135		−38.4%
1980	151		11.9%
1990	132		−12.6%
2000	177		34.1%
2010	191		7.9%
2020	212		11.0%
U.S. Decennial Census

At the 2000 census, there were 177 people, 67 households and 46 families residing in the town. The population density was 12.3 per square mile (4.8/km^{2}). There were 104 housing units at an average density of 7.2 per square mile (2.8/km^{2}). The racial makeup of the town was 94.35% White, 5.08% from other races, and 0.56% from two or more races. Hispanic or Latino of any race were 7.34% of the population.

There were 67 households, of which 34.3% had children under the age of 18 living with them, 59.7% were married couples living together, 6.0% had a female householder with no husband present, and 29.9% were non-families. 29.9% of all households were made up of individuals, and 17.9% had someone living alone who was 65 years of age or older. The average household size was 2.64 and the average family size was 3.30.

29.9% of the population were under the age of 18, 7.9% from 18 to 24, 19.8% from 25 to 44, 22.6% from 45 to 64, and 19.8% who were 65 years of age or older. The median age was 39 years. For every 100 females, there were 108.2 males. For every 100 females age 18 and over, there were 106.7 males.

The median household income was $25,625 and the median family income was $32,750. Males had a median income of $29,250 and females $17,083. The per capita income was $11,356. About 19.6% of families and 15.9% of the population were below the poverty line, including 10.3% of those under the age of eighteen and 8.3% of those 65 or over.

== Courthouse ==
The historic courthouse is located at the southwest corner of SR-153 and US-89 (Main Street). The previous courthouse is now a private residence that is rented out. Sometime around 1980 a new courthouse/post office was built about one mile (1.6 km) north. The new building also serves as offices for Piute County.
