= Trail of the Ancients =

Scenic byways in western United States

Coordinates: 36.998979°N 109.045186°W

Trail of the Ancients National Scenic Byways

Route information
- Length: 1,271 mi (2,045 km)

Location
- Country: United States
- States: Arizona, Colorado, New Mexico, and Utah
- Counties: Apache County, Arizona; Navajo County, Arizona; Montezuma County, Colorado; McKinley County, New Mexico; San Juan County, New Mexico; San Juan County, Utah; Cibola County, New Mexico

Highway system
- Scenic Byways; National; National Forest; BLM; NPS
- Arizona State Highway System; Interstate; US; State; Scenic Proposed; Former
- Colorado State Highway System; Interstate; US; State; Scenic
- New Mexico State Highway System; Interstate; US; State; Scenic
- Utah State Highway System; Interstate; US; State; Minor; Scenic

The Trail of the Ancients is a collection of National Scenic Byways located in the U.S. Four Corners states of Utah, Colorado, New Mexico, and Arizona. These byways comprise:

- The 366-mile (589 km) Trail of the Ancients National Scenic Byway in San Juan County, Utah;
- The 116-mile (187 km) Trail of the Ancients Scenic and Historic Byway in Montezuma County, Colorado;
- The 662.4-mile (1,066 km) Trail of the Ancients Scenic Byway in McKinley and San Juan counties, New Mexico;
- The 100.3-mile (161 km) Dine' Tah "Among the People" Scenic Road in Apache County, Arizona, and the 26-mile (42 km) Kayenta-Monument Valley Scenic Road in Navajo County, Arizona.

The byways highlight the archaeological and cultural history of southwestern Native American peoples, and traverses the widely diverse geological landscape of the Four Corners region of the Colorado Plateau. It was the first National Scenic Byway that was designated primarily for its archaeological sites.

== Route Description ==
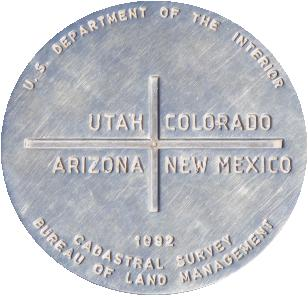
Four Corners marker

The National Scenic Byway connects prehistoric sites of Native Americans, including the Navajo, Utes and early puebloan people, who lived and farmed in the Four Corners area from about 1 CE to about 1300 CE. There were people hunting and gathering for food in the Four Corners region by 10,000 B.C. or earlier. Geological features include sandstone-rimmed canyons, snow-capped mountains, red rock landscapes and green valleys. Most of the stops — archaeological sites, Native American lands or modern communities — are near or on paved roads, but some of the roads are rugged graded roads.

=== Colorado ===
==== Four Corners to Mesa Verde ====
Four Corners Monument recognizes the only quadripoint in the United States. Members of the Navajo Nation (Utah, Arizona, and New Mexico), and the Ute Mountain Indian Reservation (Colorado) live in the Four Corners region on land surrounding the monument.

From the monument, the byway follows U.S. Route 160, crossing the San Juan River and continuing in a northeasterly direction, (Note: At the intersection of State Road-41, the northwesterly road leads to the Utah section of the Trail of the Ancients) merging with U.S. Route 491 near the Ute Mountain Ute Tribal Park Visitor Center. The park has archaeological evidence of Ancestral Puebloan sites and the Ute culture. The route turns northerly, passing Ute Mountain and Yucca House National Monument, an unexcavated Ancestral Puebloan site.

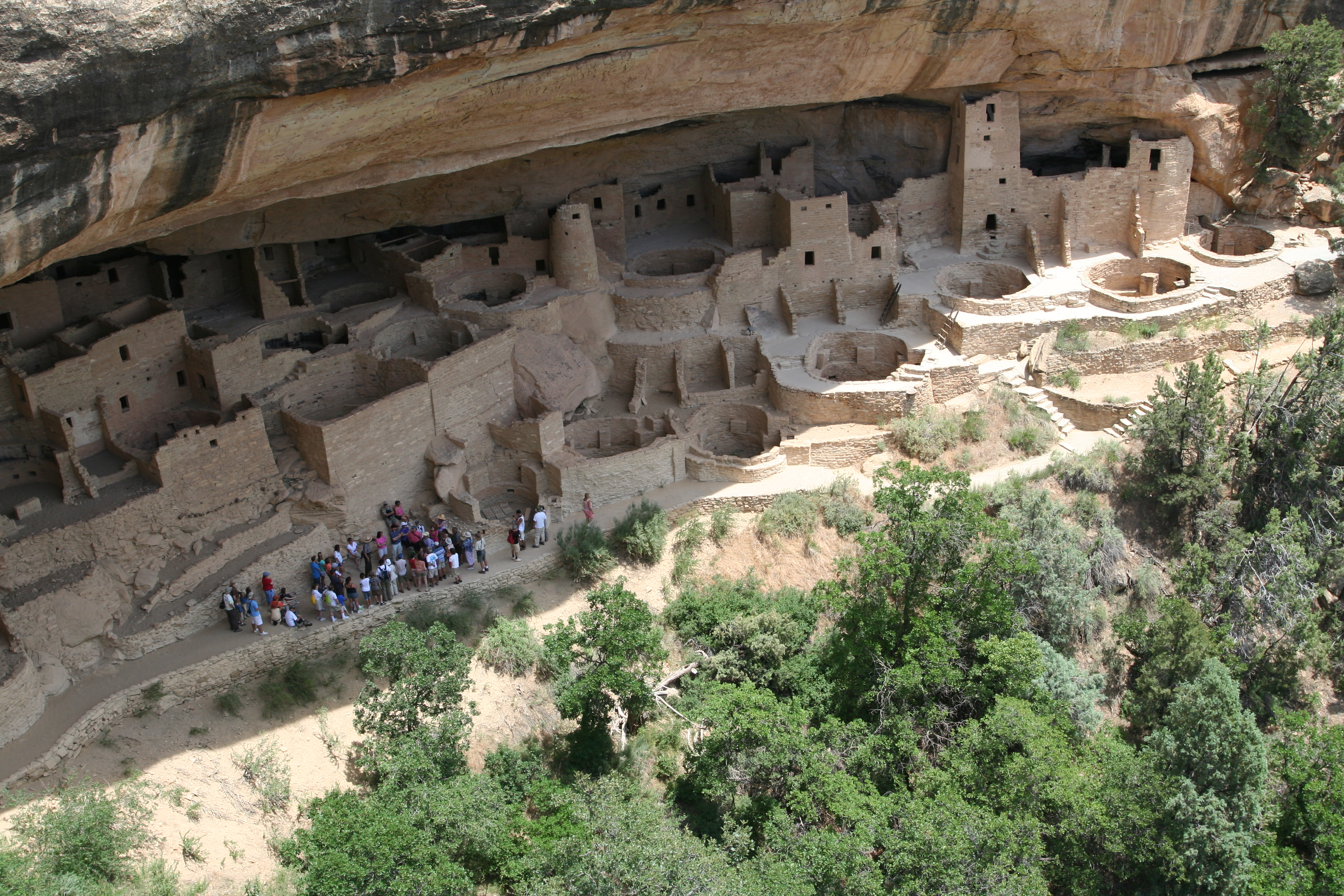
Mesa Verde National Park - Cliff Palace

The route continues along U.S. Routes 160 / 491 to Cortez, the county seat of Montezuma County. Located within the city are the Cortez Cultural Center and Hawkins Preserve and Hawkins Pueblo. The Cortez Cultural Center has interpretive exhibits of the Navajo and Ute Native Americans and the early Puebloan people.

A spur of the byway follows Main Street / U.S. 160 east from Cortez to the entrance of Mesa Verde National Park, a U.S. national park preserving over 4000 archaeological sites - including 600 cliff dwellings - of the Ancestral Pueblo people. Mesa Verde is designated as a World Heritage Site.

==== Cortez to Hovenweep ====
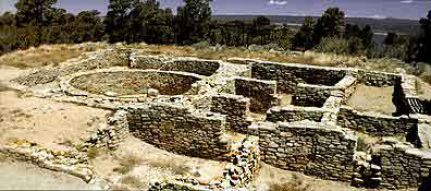
Anasazi Heritage Center - Escalante Pueblo

The Colorado section of the byway continues north and west on state highways 145 and 184 from Cortez, passing Dolores, the McPhee Reservoir, and the Canyons of the Ancients Visitor Center and Museum, a museum of the Ancient Pueblo (or Anasazi) and other Native cultures in the Four Corners region. Escalante and Dominguez Pueblos are located on the center's site. The museum is also the location of the Canyons of the Ancients National Monument visitor center.

The byway briefly follows U.S. 491 through the unincorporated communities of Lewis, Yellow Jacket, and Pleasant View, before entering Canyons of the Ancients National Monument proper, a Bureau of Land Management site comprising over 6000 archaeological ruins over 183,000 acres., on Montezuma County Road CC.

Hovenweep National Monument

Along the byway is Lowry Pueblo, a National Historic Landmark in Canyons of the Ancients National Monument, originally excavated in the 1930s and dating to around 1060 AD. The byway continues towards the Utah border along Montezuma County Road 10, crossing the Old Spanish National Historic Trail, a historic trade route connecting Santa Fe with Los Angeles.

At the Utah state line, the byway becomes San Juan County Road 213 (Hovenweep Road), passing some of the outlying sites of Hovenweep National Monument Hovenweep National Monument preserves six sites Ancestral Puebloan settlements in Utah and Colorado.

=== Utah ===
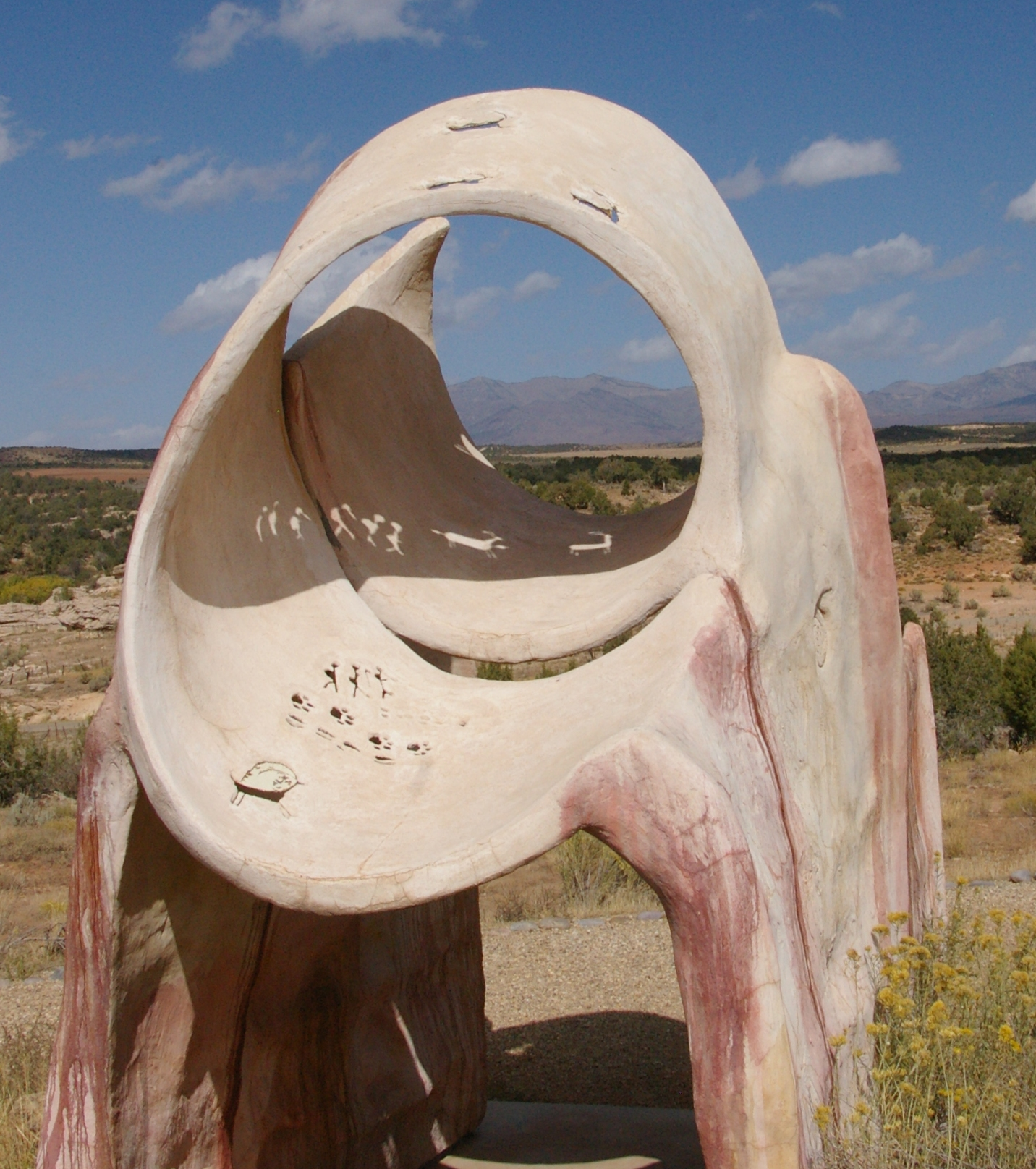
Sun sculpture at Edge of the Cedars State Park

The Utah portion of the byway follows a patchwork of federal (U.S. Route 163, U.S. Route 191), state (Utah State Route 95, Utah State Route 261, Utah State Route 262), and local roads in San Juan County and northern Navajo Nation.

==== Hovenweep to Bluff and Blanding ====
After crossing the state border into Utah and passing the entrance to Hovenweep National Monument, the byway heads west to White Mesa and the junction with U.S. Route 191. South of White Mesa, the byway connects to Bluff and the southwestern sections of the byway; north of White Mesa, the route connects to Blanding and Edge of the Cedars State Park. The park features Ancestral Puebloan ruins, a museum, and artifacts that provide a detailed view of how the Ancestral Puebloan lived and worked.

The northernmost spur of the byway extends to Monticello, Utah. Nearby features include Manti–La Sal National Forest and Newspaper Rock State Historic Monument, one of the largest known collection of petroglyphs from indigenous peoples who lived in the area 2,000 years ago.

==== Blanding to Natural Bridges ====
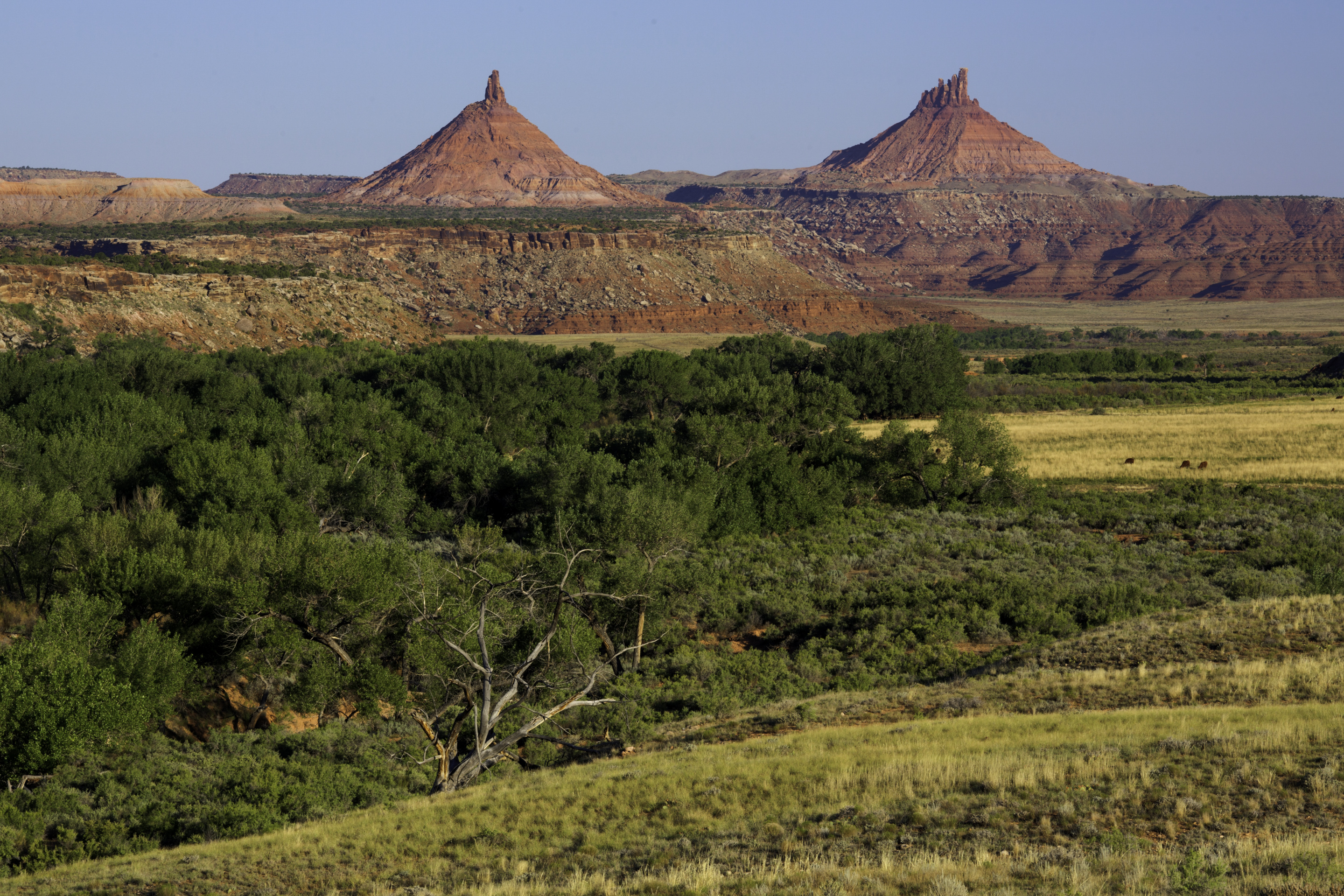
Bears Ears National Monument

West of Blanding, the byway follows Utah State Route 95 across Comb Ridge and through Comb Wash, before ascending the eastern side of Cedar Mesa and entering Bears Ears National Monument.

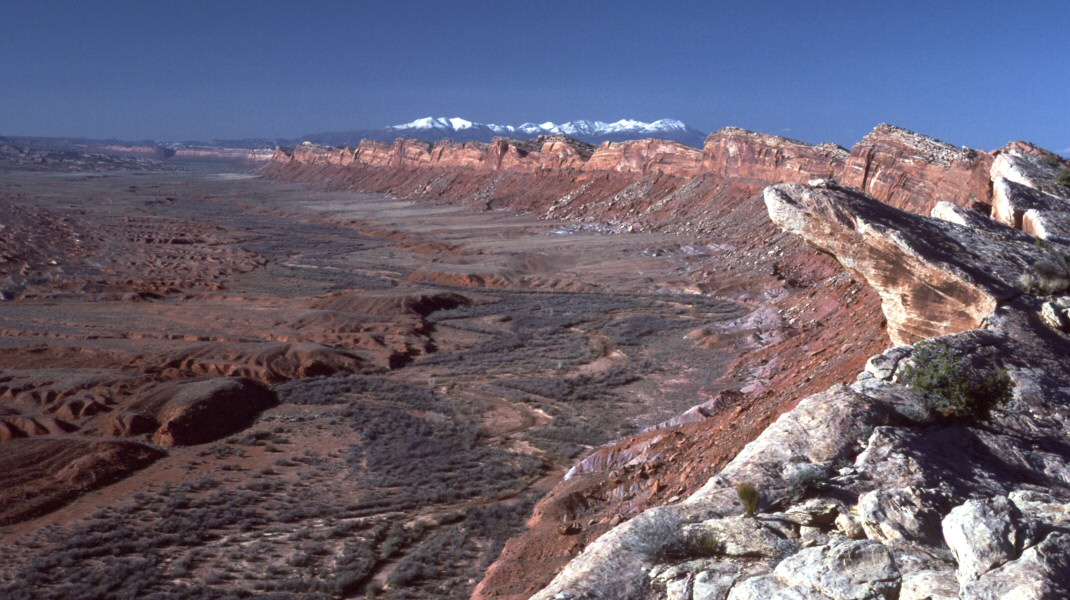
Comb Wash

The monument is co-managed by the Bureau of Land Management and United States Forest Service, along with a coalition of five local Native American tribes: the Navajo Nation, Hopi, Ute Mountain Ute, Ute Indian Tribe of the Uintah and Ouray Reservation, and the Pueblo of Zuni, all of which have ancestral ties to the region. Nearby ruins include the partially reconstructed Mule Canyon Ruin and the Butler Wash cliff dwellings.

A short spur of the byway connects to Natural Bridges National Monument. The park loop passes three of the largest natural bridges in the world.

==== Natural Bridges to Monument Valley ====
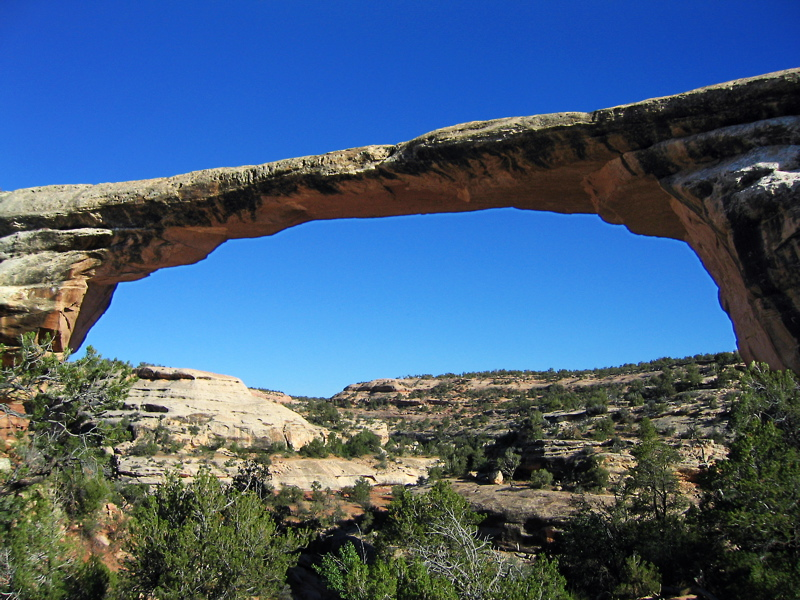
Owachomo Natural Bridge

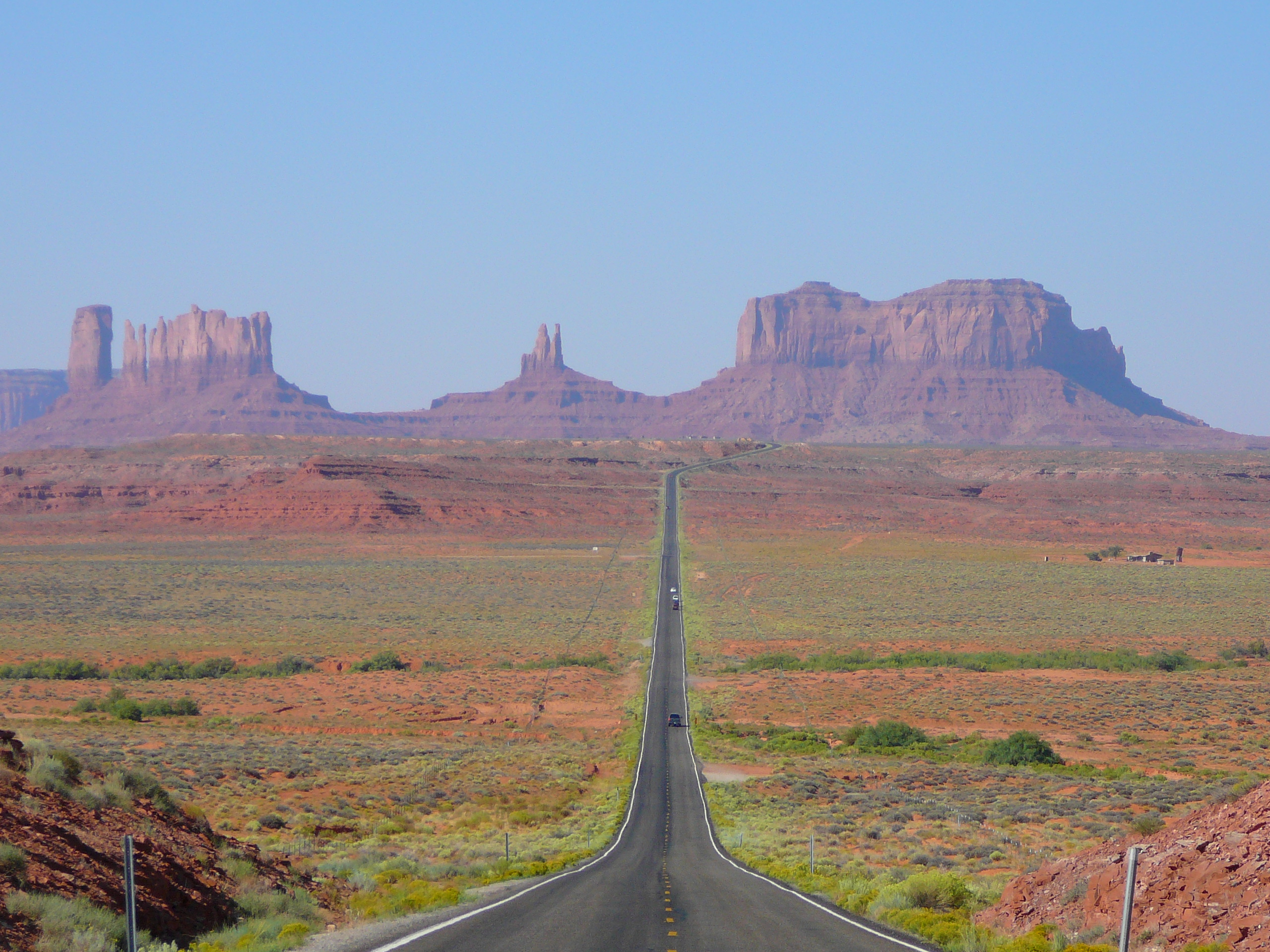
Monument Valley

The byway heads south on Utah State Route 95 atop Cedar Mesa, passing the Grand Gulch Primitive Area and the eastern reaches of Glen Canyon National Recreation Area, before descending the plateau at Moki Dugway and entering the Valley of the Gods. A few miles through the valley is the turnoff for Goosenecks State Park, just outside the town of Mexican Hat.

The southwestern spur of the byway proceeds along U.S. 163 through Mexican Hat and crosses the San Juan River into Navajo Nation. This section of the byway ends at the Arizona border, within Monument Valley and at the entrance to Monument Valley Navajo Tribal Park.

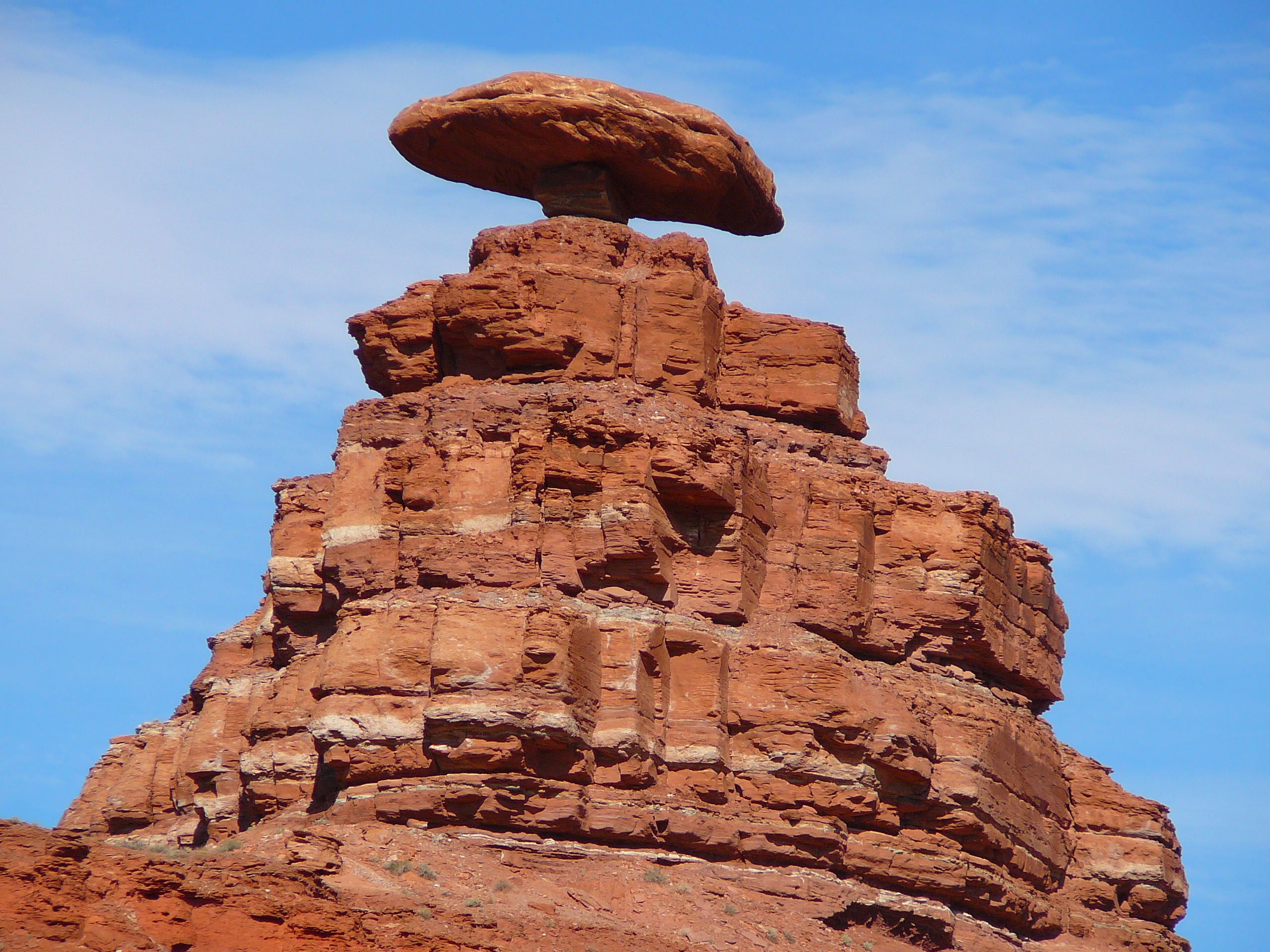
Mexican Hat

==== Mexican Hat to Four Corners ====
The byway parallels the San Juan River east and north of Mexican Hat, once again crossing Comb Ridge and intersecting with U.S. 191 and Utah State Route 162 near Bluff. The byway continues through the San Juan valley, passing through Montezuma Creek, UT and Aneth, UT before reentering the Ute Mountain Ute Indian Reservation in Colorado and intersecting with U.S. 160 east of the Four Corners Monument.

== Neighboring byways ==
=== Bicentennial Scenic Byway ===
The stretch of road from Blanding to Natural Bridges National Monument along Utah State Route 95 is also the Bicentennial Scenic Byway, which continues north on UT-95 to Hanksville, UT.

=== San Juan Skyway Scenic and Historic Byway ===
The Trail of the Ancients Scenic and Historic Byway overlaps with the San Juan Skyway Scenic and Historic Byway, an All-American Road, National Forest Scenic Byway, and Colorado Scenic and Historic Byway, on Colorado State Highway 145 between U.S. Highway 160 and Colorado State Highway 184.

== History ==
The Trail of the Ancients was made a Utah state byway about 1990. The Trail of the Ancients Scenic and Historic Byway was designated a Colorado Scenic and Historic Byway in 1994. The Trail of the Ancients was designated a National Scenic Byway on September 22, 2005 by the U.S. Secretary of Transportation and the Federal Highway Administration. The designation was the first National Scenic Byway that totally focused its sites' archaeological qualities. (Note: Senate Bill 1414 was introduced on July 15, 2005 calling for a "study of the suitability and feasibility of establishing the Trail of the Ancients National Heritage Area in the Four Corners region of the States of Utah, Colorado, Arizona, and New Mexico." The Heritage Area was to include the Trail of Ancients Scenic Byway. It was not enacted.)

== New Mexico and Arizona ==
Arizona and New Mexico are applying to have the portions of the Trail of the Ancients in their states designated National Scenic Byways. This would include the Navajo National Monument and the Canyon de Chelly National Monument in Arizona, and Chaco Culture National Historical Park in New Mexico. When all four states have official national designations the Trail of the Ancients will acquire the highest status for roads, All-American Road.

The New Mexico Trail of the Ancients was made a New Mexico Scenic Byway after July 13, 1998 and by 2013.

== See also ==
- List of Arizona Scenic Roads
- List of Colorado Scenic and Historic Byways
- List of New Mexico Scenic and Historic Byways
- List of Utah Scenic Byways
- Scenic byways in the United States
