= Utah State Route 262 =

Highway in Utah

State Route 262

Route information
- Maintained by UDOT
- Length: 22.605 mi (36.379 km)
- Existed: 1958–present

Major junctions
- West end: US 191 near Bluff
- East end: SR-162 in Montezuma Creek

Location
- Country: United States
- State: Utah

Highway system
- Utah State Highway System; Interstate; US; State; Minor; Scenic
← SR-261	→ SR-264

State Route 262 (SR-262) is a 22.605-mile-long (36.379 km) state highway completely within San Juan County in southeastern Utah. SR-262 connects U.S. Route 191 (US-191) north of Bluff to SR-162 in Montezuma Creek.

== Route description ==
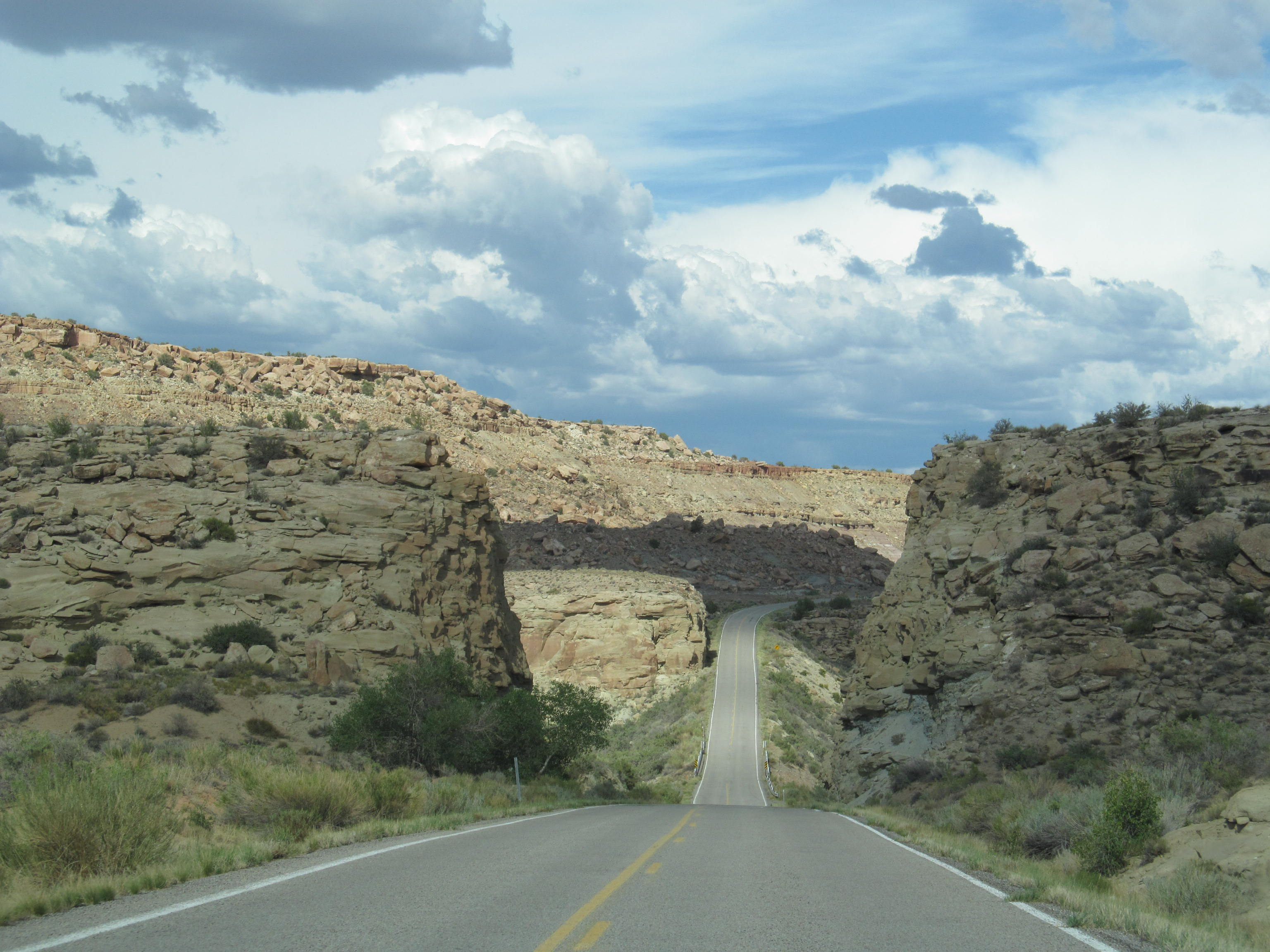
SR-262 through the mountains

After its western terminus at US-191, SR-262 generally heads east until Indian Route 5099, where it turns south-southwest. Afterwards, the route turns east and then south for one last time before reaching the eastern terminus at SR-162 in Montezuma Creek.

== History ==
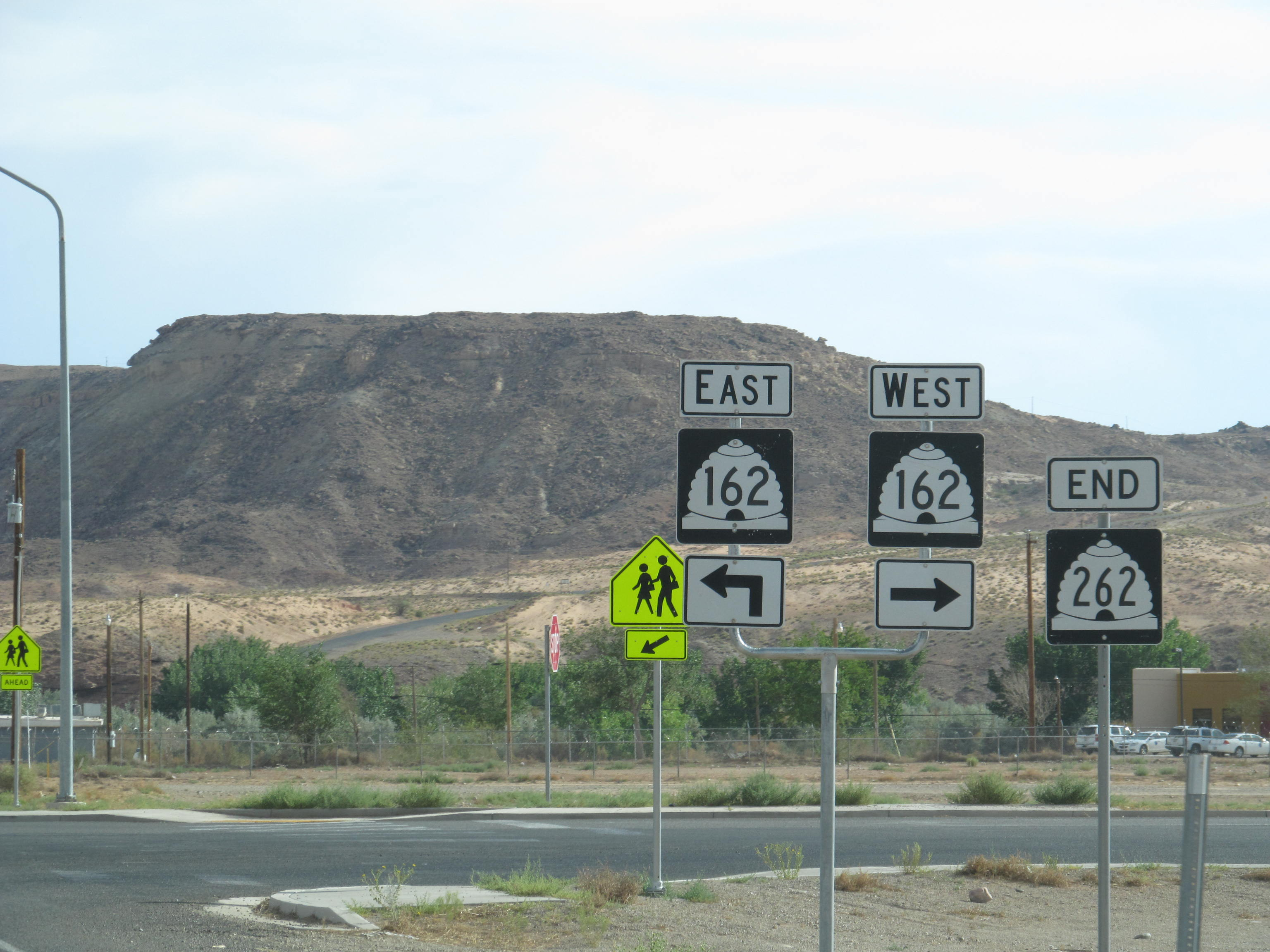
SR-262's current eastern terminus as of 2004

The State Road Commission created SR-262 in 1958, running from SR-47 (now US-191) north of Bluff east and south for 20.0 miles (32.2 km) to a point in the Aneth Oil Field about a mile (1.5 km) beyond the bridge over Montezuma Creek, near the curve to the south-southwest. In 1961, the route was extended to just beyond its present end in the settlement of Montezuma Creek, where the road to Aneth (now SR-162) turns east, and in 1965 it was extended further to the Colorado state line, connecting to SH 41 across the border. A road from Montezuma Creek west to US-191 at Bluff was added to the state highway system in 1986 as SR-163. At the time, Utah was considering making the road part of an extension of US-163 into Colorado, but plans fell through, leaving an overlap with US-191 and Route 163 near Bluff that became US-163 to the west and SR-163 to the east. To fix this issue, SR-163 was renumbered SR-162 in 2004, and the part of SR-262 east of Montezuma Creek also became SR-162.

== Major intersections ==
The entire route is in San Juan County.

Location	mi	km	Destinations	Notes
Bluff	0.000	0.000	US 191 – Bluff, Blanding	Western terminus
Montezuma Creek	22.605	36.379	SR-162 to SH 41	Eastern terminus
1.000 mi = 1.609 km; 1.000 km = 0.621 mi

== See also ==
- List of state highways in Utah
