= Jason R. Workman Memorial Bridge =

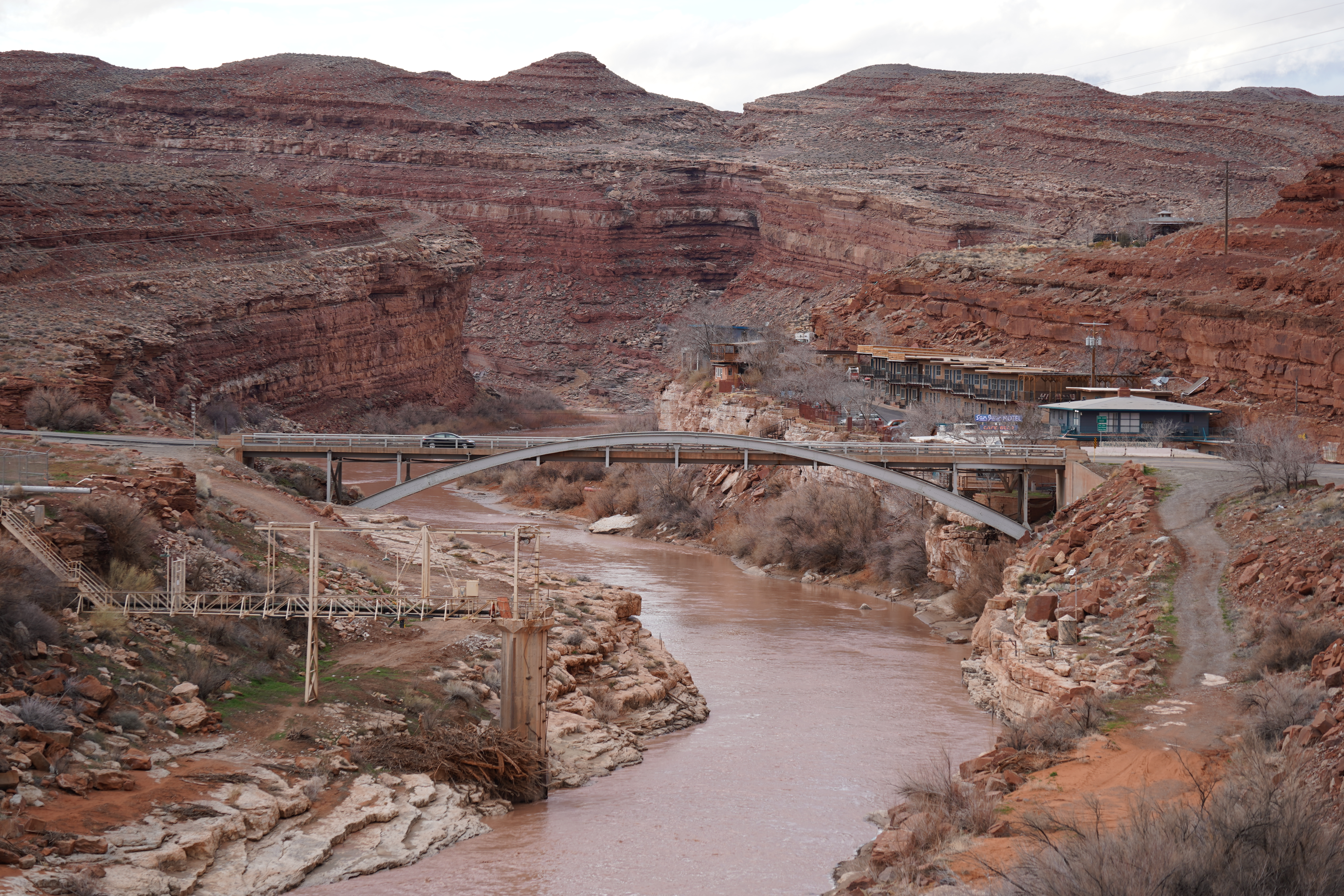
Jason R. Workman Memorial Bridge

The Jason R. Workman Memorial Bridge brings U.S. Route 163 over the San Juan River near Mexican Hat, Utah. It is a picturesque arch bridge, built in 1953.

In 2016 the U.S. Route 163 (US 163) bridge crossing the San Juan River on the south border of the town was renamed to be the Jason R. Workman Memorial Bridge after a member of SEAL Team Six who was killed in action in Afghanistan on August 6, 2011. Workman was a 1997 graduate of the nearby San Juan High School. The renaming was a Utah legislative action, and became official after Utah Governor Gary Herbert signed the bill.

Workman was killed, along with 37 others, when a Chinook helicopter transporting Seal Team Six was shot down on August 6, 2011, on its way to aid in an intense firefight, in the war in Afghanistan. Workman's remains were buried in Arlington National Cemetery. He was age 32, and had a wife and a son.
