= Utah State Route 162 =

State highway in San Juan County, Utah, US

State Route 162

Route information
- Maintained by UDOT
- Length: 31.852 mi (51.261 km)
- Existed: 2004–present

Major junctions
- West end: US 191 near Bluff
- SR-262 in Montezuma Creek
- East end: SH 41 at the Colorado state line near Aneth

Location
- Country: United States
- State: Utah
- Counties: San Juan

Highway system
- Utah State Highway System; Interstate; US; State; Minor; Scenic
← SR-161	→ US 163

State Route 162 (SR-162) is a state highway located in San Juan County, Utah, United States. It begins at US-191 east of Bluff. It then follows the former alignment of SR-163 to Montezuma Creek. There, it intersects UT-262 at its southern terminus. Afterwards, it follows SR-262's former alignment past Aneth to the Colorado state line. Colorado State Highway 41 takes over in the Centennial State, ending at a junction with US-160 6 miles east of the Four Corners Monument.

== Route description ==
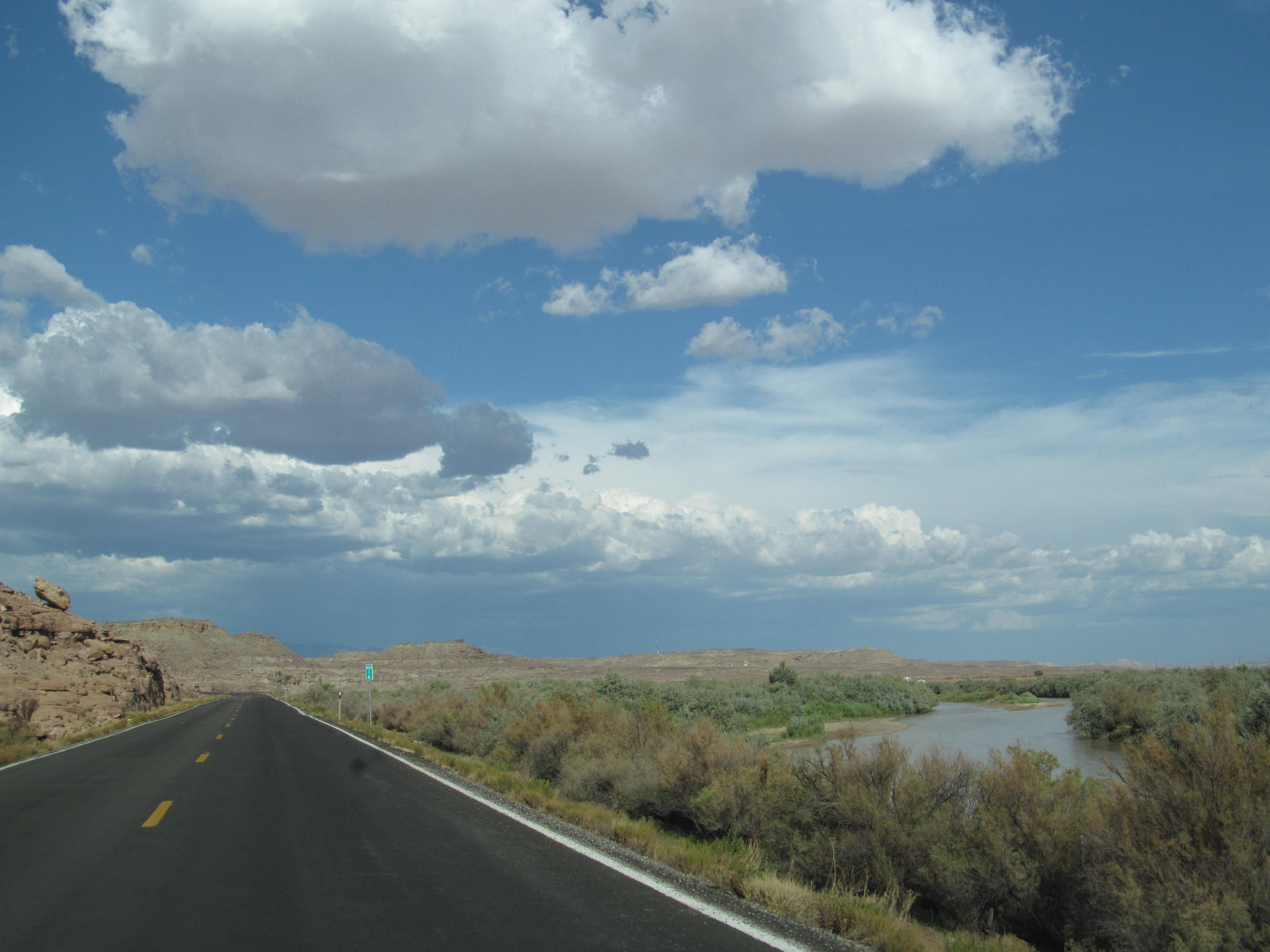
SR-162 at mile 16

The road begins at U.S. Route 191 in Bluff in a desert area. Paralleling the San Juan River along Mission Road, the road winds eastward along the north border of the Navajo Nation. Travelling through the city of Montezuma Creek, the road intersects State Route 262. The route then travels through the city of Aneth along the Trail of the Ancients, entering the Navajo Nation. SH 162 meets its east end at the Colorado state line, where State Highway 41 continues into the Ute Mountain Indian Reservation.

== History ==
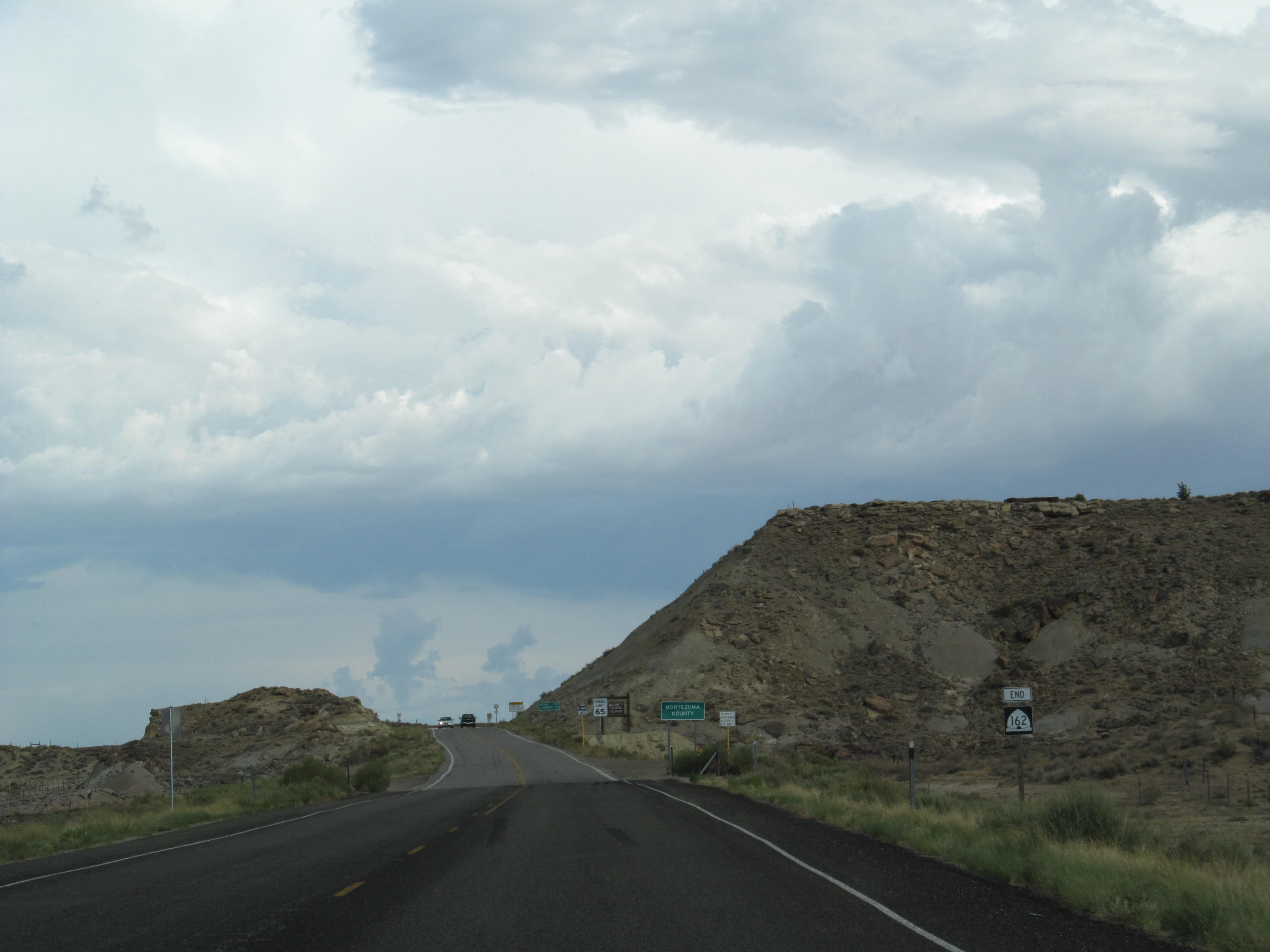
SR-162 approaching the Colorado border

The State Road Commission created SR-262 in 1958, running from SR-47 (now US-191) north of Bluff east and south for 20.0 miles (32.2 km) to a point in the Aneth Oil Field about a mile (1.5 km) beyond the bridge over Montezuma Creek, near the curve to the south-southwest. In 1961, the route was extended to just beyond its present end in the settlement of Montezuma Creek, where the road to Aneth (now SR-162) turns east, and in 1965 it was extended further to the Colorado state line, connecting to SH 41 across the border. A road from Montezuma Creek west to US-191 at Bluff was added to the state highway system in 1986 as SR-163. At the time, Utah was considering making the road part of an extension of US-163 into Colorado, but plans fell through, leaving an overlap with US-191 and Route 163 near Bluff that became US-163 to the west and SR-163 to the east. To fix this issue, SR-163 was renumbered SR-162 in 2004, and the part of SR-262 east of Montezuma Creek also became SR-162.

== Major intersections ==
The entire route is in San Juan County.

Location	mi	km	Destinations	Notes
Bluff	0.000	0.000	US 191	Western terminus
Montezuma Creek	14.543	23.405	SR-262	
	31.852	51.261	SH 41	Eastern terminus
1.000 mi = 1.609 km; 1.000 km = 0.621 mi

== See also ==
- List of state highways in Utah
