= Montezuma Creek =

Montezuma Creek may refer to:

- Montezuma Creek, Utah, a settlement in San Juan County, Utah
- Montezuma Creek (Utah), a river in San Juan County, Utah, that begins near Monticello and empties into the San Juan River at the settlement
