= List of Utah Scenic Byways =

Utah Scenic Byways
- Highway markers for Interstate 15, US Highway 89 and State Route 201

Highway names
- Interstates: Interstate nn (I-nn)
- US Highways: US Highway nn (US-nn)
- State: State Route nn (SR-nn)

System links
- Utah State Highway System; Interstate; US; State; Minor; Scenic

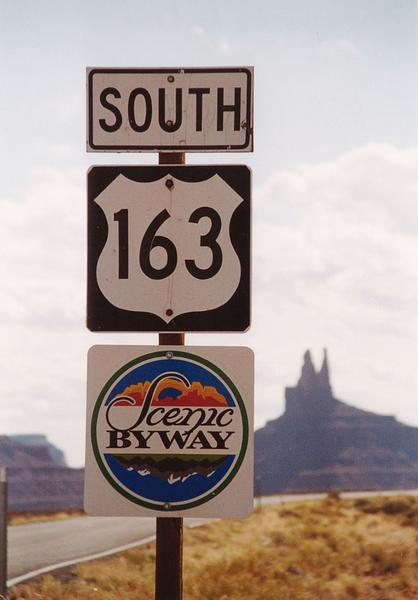
US-163 Trail of the Ancients Scenic Byway

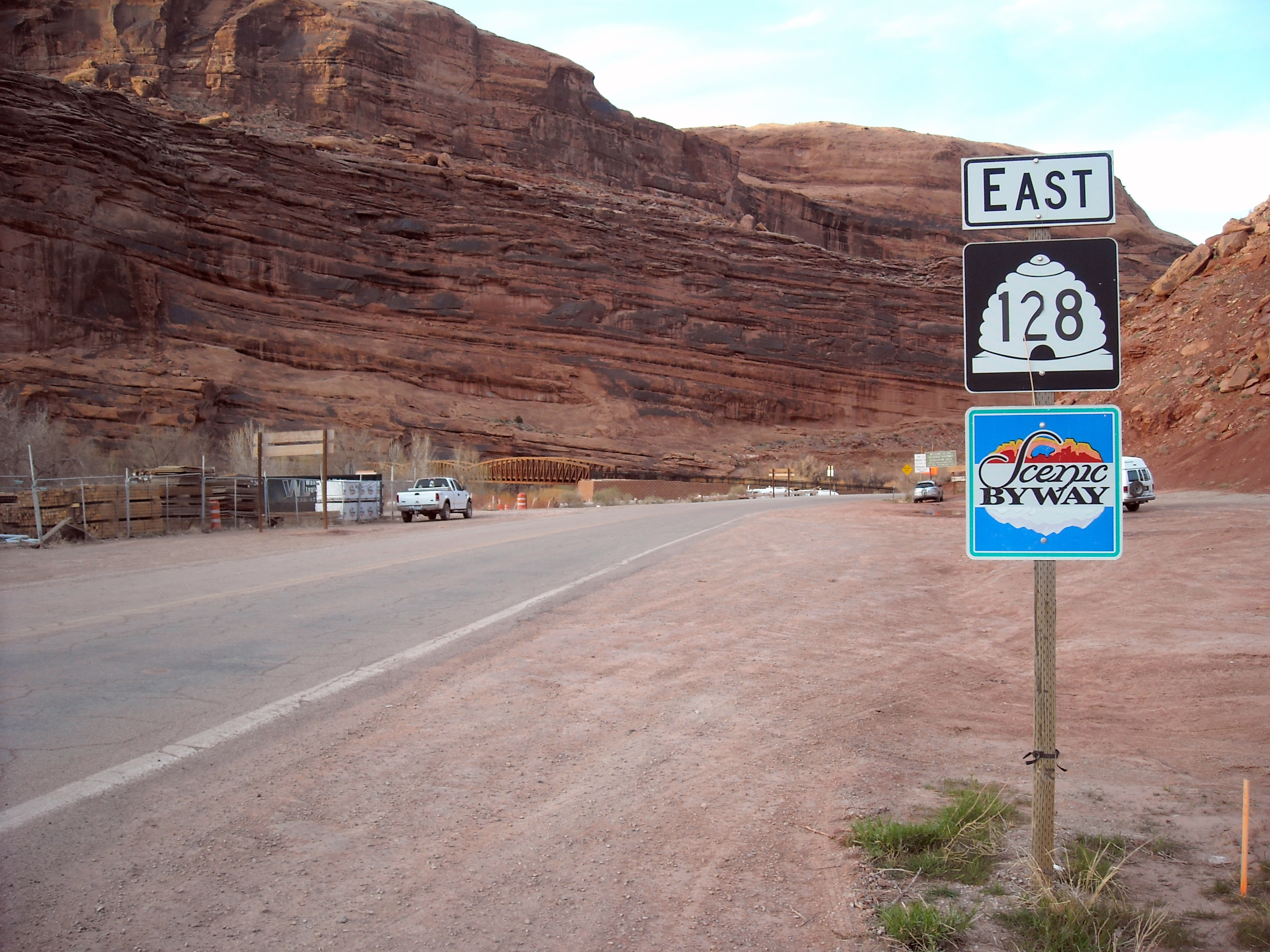
SR-128 Dinosaur Diamond Scenic Byway

The legislature in the U.S. state of Utah has designated a system of Utah Scenic Byways in addition to the National Scenic Byways that are defined within the state. Some of the state designated routes overlap with the federal designations. The Utah Department of Transportation has signed both the state and federal designations with a Scenic Byway plaque directly below the route number. The byway system is defined at Utah Administrative Code section R926-13. The state has also designated some local, county and Forest Service roads as Scenic Backways.

== National Scenic Byways in Utah ==
| Name | From | To | Highways Designated | Notes |
|---|---|---|---|---|
| Dinosaur Diamond Prehistoric Highway | Price | Delta, CO | US-191, US-40, CO-64, CO-139, I-70, US-50, SR-128 | Diamond-shaped loop in Utah and Colorado |
| The Energy Loop: Huntington/Eccles Canyons Scenic Byway | Fairview | Huntington | SR-31, SR-96 | Made up of Eccles Canyon Scenic Byway and Huntington Canyon Scenic Byway |
| Flaming Gorge-Uintas Scenic Byway | Vernal | Manila | US-191, SR-44 | |
| Highway 12 - A Journey Through Time Scenic Byway | near Panguitch | near Torrey | SR-12 | Also designated an All American Road |
| Logan Canyon Scenic Byway | Logan | Bear Lake | US-89 | |
| Nebo Loop Scenic Byway | near Nephi | Payson | USFS road | |
| Trail of the Ancients | Natural Bridges National Monument | Mesa Verde National Park | US-163, SR-261, SR-275, SR-95, US-191, SR-162, SR-262, CO-41, US-160, CO-145, CO-184, US-491, Montezuma County CC, San Juan County 414 | Several Roads in the Four Corners region. Though the federal designation only lists routes in Utah and Colorado, the Four Corners Monument is included as an attraction which requires entering New Mexico to access. |
| Zion Park Scenic Byway | La Verkin | East Entrance of Zion National Park | SR-9 | Designated on February 16, 2021. |

== State designated scenic byways ==
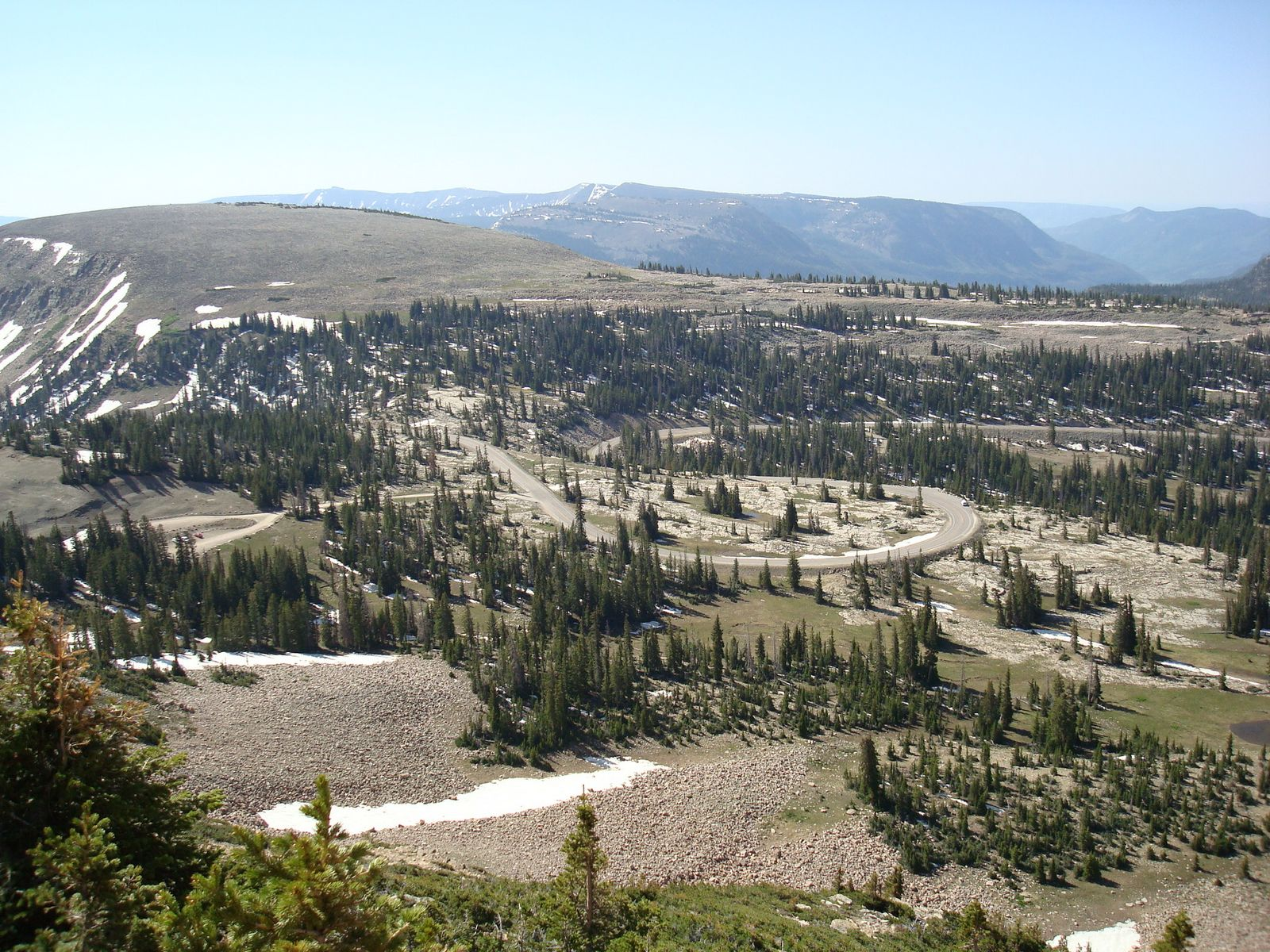
SR-150 Mirror Lake Scenic Byway

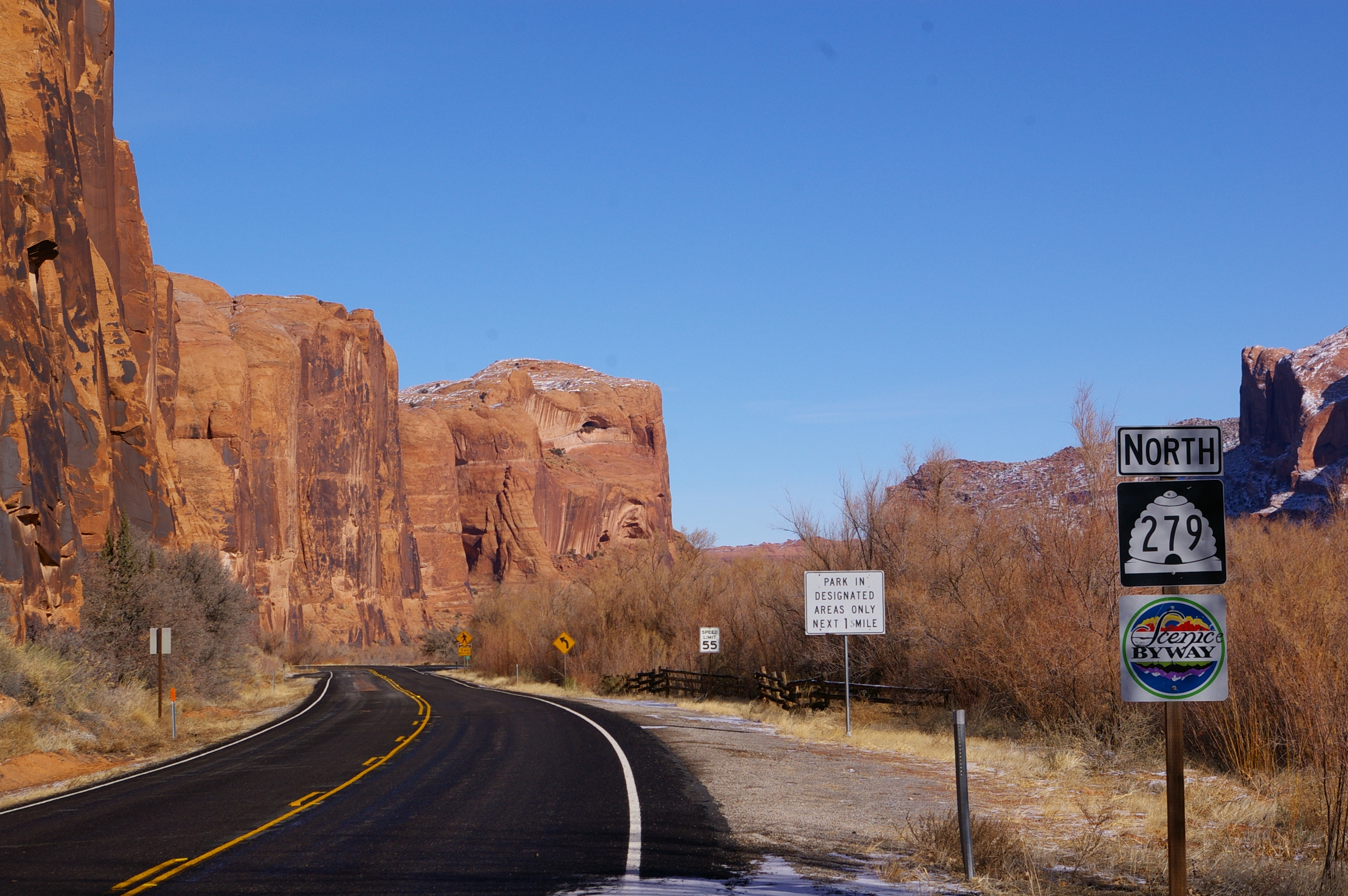
SR-279 Lower Colorado Scenic Byway

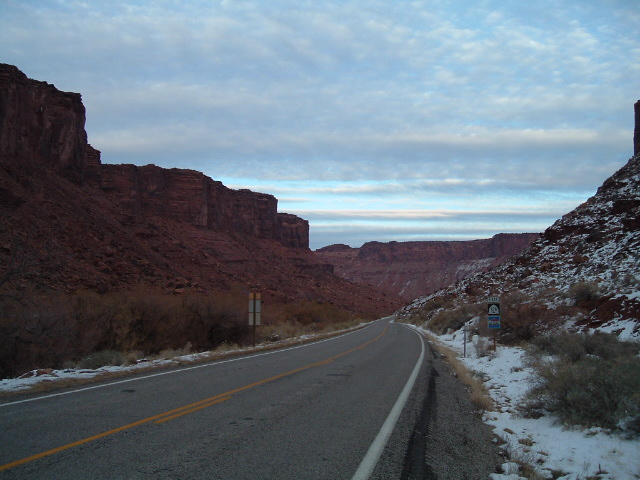
SR-128 Upper Colorado Scenic Byway

| Name | Highways | Notes |
|---|---|---|
| Bear Lake Scenic Byway | SR-30, Garden City (US-89) to Laketown | |
| Beaver Canyon Scenic Byway | SR-153, Beaver (SR-160) to Elk Meadows | |
| Bicentennial-Trail of the Ancients Scenic Byway | SR-95, US-191, and SR-162, Hanksville (SR-24) to Colorado; branches to Natural Bridges National Monument via SR-275 and Blanding via US-191 | A portion is included in the Trail of the Ancients National Scenic Byway |
| Big Cottonwood Canyon Scenic Byway | SR-190, Cottonwood Heights (SR-210) to Brighton | |
| Brian Head-Panguitch Lake Scenic Byway | SR-143, Parowan (I-15) to Panguitch (US-89) | |
| Capitol Reef Country Scenic Byway | SR-24, Loa (SR-72) to Hanksville (SR-95) | |
| Cedar Breaks Scenic Byway | SR-148, SR-14 to SR-143 via Cedar Breaks National Monument | |
| Dead Horse Point Mesa Scenic Byway | SR-313, US-191 to Dead Horse Point State Park; branch to Grandview Point via Island in the Sky Road | |
| Fishlake Scenic Byway | SR-25 and forest and local roads, SR-24 to SR-72 | |
| Great Salt Lake Legacy Parkway Scenic Byway | SR-67, Salt Lake City (I-215) to Farmington (I-15) | Also designated as the Legacy Parkway |
| Indian Canyon Scenic Byway | US-191, Helper (US-6) to Duchesne (US-40) | Part of the Dinosaur Diamond Prehistoric Highway |
| Indian Creek Scenic Byway | SR-211, US-191 to Canyonlands National Park | |
| Kolob Fingers Road Scenic Byway | Zion National Park road, I-15 to Kolob Canyon Overlook | |
| Little Cottonwood Canyon Scenic Byway | SR-210, Granite (SR-209) to Alta | |
| Markagunt High Plateau Scenic Byway | SR-14, Cedar City (SR-130) to Long Valley Junction (US-89) | |
| Mirror Lake Scenic Byway | SR-150, Kamas (SR-32) to Wyoming | Cuts through the western Uinta Mountains and is the highest paved road in Utah with a summit at elevation 10,715 ft (3,266 m). (3266 m) |
| Monument Valley to Bluff Scenic Byway | US-163 and US-191, Arizona to Bluff | Part of the Trail of the Ancients |
| Mt. Carmel Scenic Byway | US-89, Kanab to Bryce Canyon Junction (SR-12) | |
| Ogden River Scenic Byway | SR-39, Ogden at the mouth of Ogden Canyon to west of Woodruff; loops around Pineview Reservoir via SR-158 and former SR-166 | |
| Potash-Lower Colorado River Scenic Byway | SR-279, potash mine to US-191 | |
| Provo Canyon Scenic Byway | US-189 and SR-113, Provo (SR-52) to Heber City (US-40) | |
| Upper Colorado River Scenic Byway | SR-128, US-191 near Moab to I-70 near Cisco | Part of the Dinosaur Diamond Prehistoric Highway |
