= Colorado State Highway 41 =

State highway in Montezuma County, Colorado, United States

State Highway 41
- Map of Montezuma County in southwestern Colorado with SH 41 highlighted in red

Route information
- Maintained by CDOT
- Length: 9.505 mi (15.297 km)
- Tourist routes: Trail of the Ancients

Major junctions
- South end: US 160 northeast of Teec Nos Pos, AZ
- North end: SR-162 at the Utah state line near Aneth, UT

Location
- Country: United States
- State: Colorado
- Counties: Montezuma

Highway system
- Colorado State Highway System; Interstate; US; State; Scenic
← SH 40	→ SH 42

State Highway 41 (SH 41) is a 9.505-mile (15.297 km) state highway on the Ute Mountain Ute lands in Montezuma County, Colorado, United States, that connects U.S. Route 160 (US 160), northeast of Teec Nos Pos, Arizona, with Utah State Route 162 SR-162 in Utah (southeast of Aneth, Utah). The highway is part of the Trail of the Ancients National Scenic Byway

== Description ==
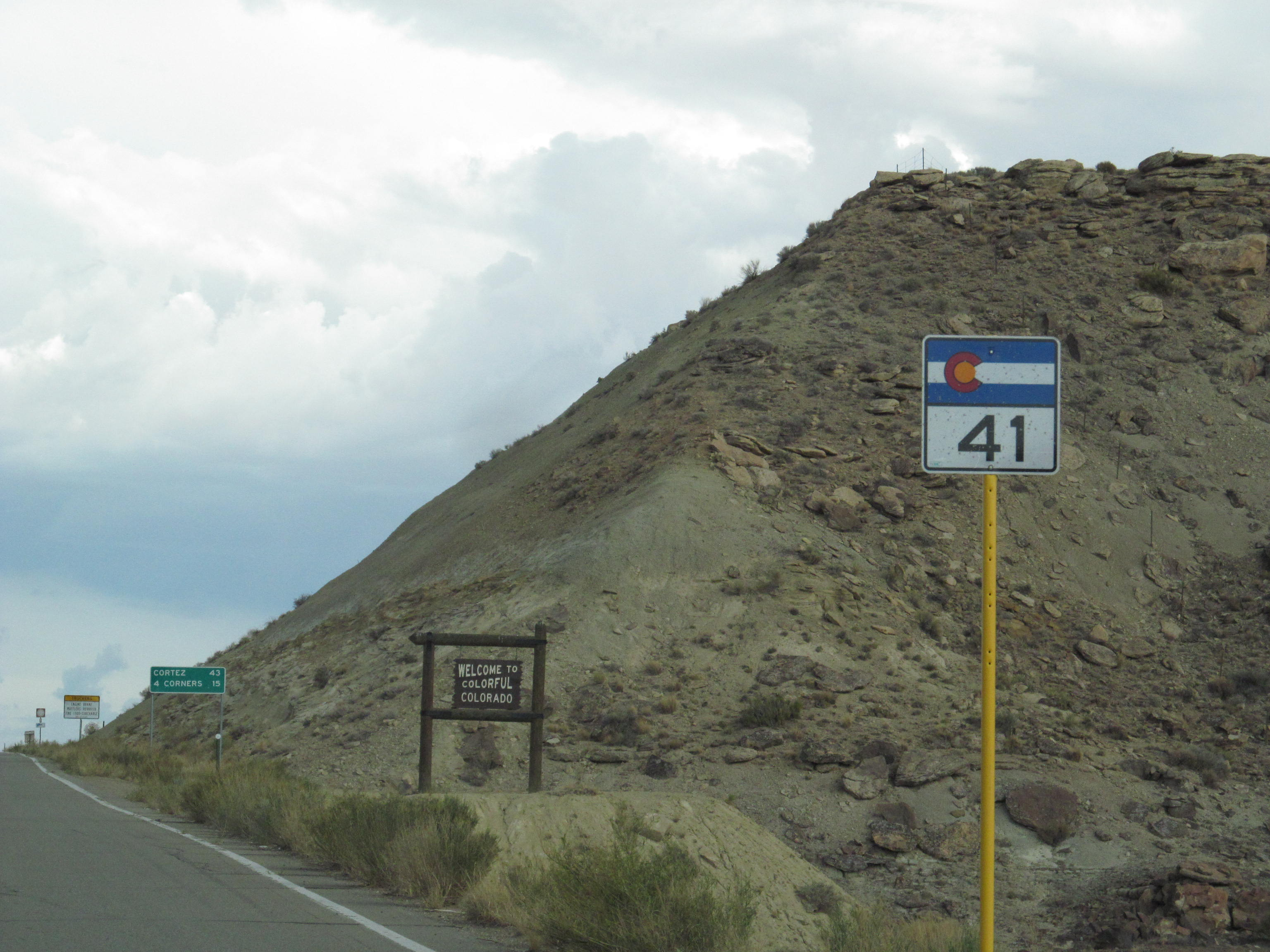
SH 41 as it enters Colorado from Utah, July 2012

SH 41 begins at an intersection with US 160 in the southwestern corner of Montezuma County, roughly 10 miles (16 km) northeast of Teec Nos Pos and the Four Corners Monument. The highway heads north–northwest paralleling the San Juan River for approximately 9.5 miles (15.3 km) until it reaches its northern terminus at the Utah state line, roughly 8 miles (13 km) southeast of Aneth. The roadway continues west as SR-162 towards Aneth, Montezuma Creek, and Bluff, Utah.

== History ==
SH 41 was created in 1965-1966 on new alignment. Simultaneously, in June 1965, Utah State Route 262 was extended southeast from Montezuma Creek to meet SH 41 (this extension became SR-162 in 2004).

== Major intersections ==
The entire route is in Montezuma County.

Location	mi	km	Destinations	Notes
	0.000	0.000	US 160 east – Cortez, Shiprock (New Mexico) US 160 west – Four Corners Monument, Teec Nos Pos (Arizona)	Southern terminus; T intersection
	9.505	15.297	SR-162 west – Aneth, Blanding, Monticello, Moab	Northern terminus; Utah state line; Western end of SR-162
1.000 mi = 1.609 km; 1.000 km = 0.621 mi

== See also ==
- List of state highways in Colorado
