= U.S. Route 163 =

Highway in Arizona and Utah

U.S. Route 163
- US 163 highlighted in red

Route information
- Maintained by ADOT and UDOT
- Length: 64.62 mi (104.00 km)
- Existed: 1970–present

Major junctions
- South end: US 160 / BIA Route 591 south of Kayenta, AZ
- North end: US 191 in Bluff, UT

Location
- Country: United States
- States: Arizona, Utah
- Counties: AZ: Navajo; UT: San Juan

Highway system
- United States Numbered Highway System; List; Special; Divided
- Arizona State Highway System; Interstate; US; State; Scenic Proposed; Former
- Utah State Highway System; Interstate; US; State; Minor; Scenic
← US 101	US	→ US 400
← US 160	AZ	→ SR 169
← SR-162	UT	→ SR-164

U.S. Route 163 (also U.S. Highway 163, US 163) is a 64-mile (103 km) U.S. Highway that runs from US 160 northward to US 191 in the U.S. states of Arizona and Utah. The southernmost 44 miles (71 km) of its length are within the Navajo Nation. The highway forms part of the Trail of the Ancients, a National Scenic Byway. The highway cuts through the heart of Monument Valley and has been featured in numerous movies and commercials.

The highway was designated in 1970, replacing Arizona State Route 464 and Utah State Route 47 as well as a portion of the old alignment of US 160 in Utah. In 1981, US 191 was routed over the northern section of US 163, effectively truncating the northern terminus to Bluff, Utah, from Crescent Junction. The state of Utah briefly had plans for a different routing of US 163 north of Bluff. These plans were rejected, resulting in discrepancies between the signed route and the official designation by the American Association of State Highway and Transportation Officials that were not resolved until 2008. The route number does not follow the numbering convention for U.S. Highways, as the number 163 would normally be used for a spur of US 63; however, these two highways have never connected and serve different regions of the country.

== Route description ==
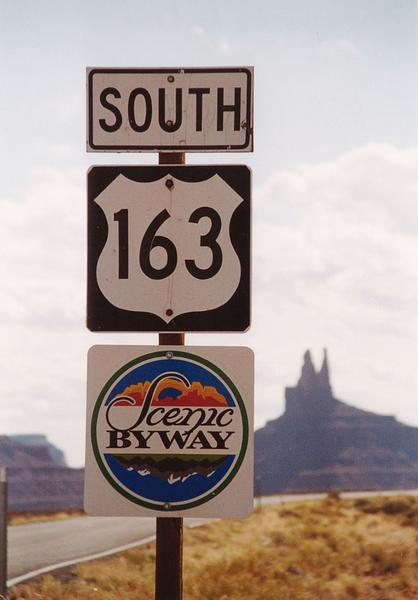
US 163 near Monument Valley, Utah

=== Arizona ===
The southern terminus of US 163 is at a junction with US 160 south of Kayenta in Navajo County and Navajo Nation. The road continues to the south of this junction as Bureau of Indian Affairs (BIA) Route 591. US 163 heads north from US 160 to the west of the Kayenta Airport as it passes through the town of Kayenta. The highway curves toward the northeast in Kayenta before it curves back toward the north. As it continues north, the highway goes through an s-curve, resulting in a northeasterly heading. US 163 continues this heading as it heads toward Monument Valley and crosses into Utah. The state of Arizona has designated an 18-mile (29 km) stretch of the highway, from approximately 5 miles (8 km) north of the US 160 junction to the Utah border, as a scenic route.

=== Utah ===
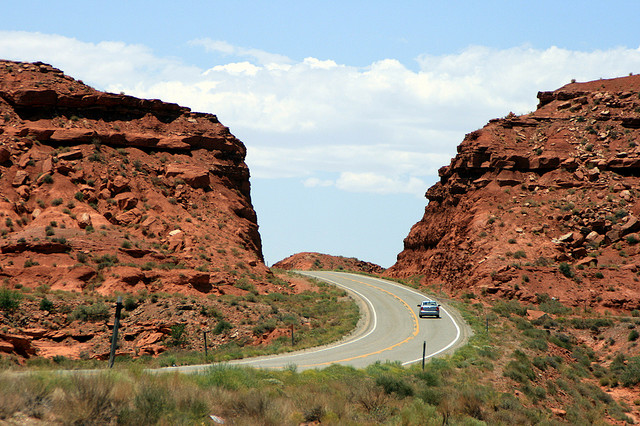
The highway offers dramatic views.

The Utah portion of the highway begins in Monument Valley, in San Juan County. Just after it enters Utah, the highway junctions with the Monument Valley Visitors center. The highway proceeds northeast until the town of Mexican Hat where the highway both crosses the San Juan River and exits the Navajo Nation. From Mexican Hat, the highway travels east crossing the Comb Ridge toward its terminus in Bluff. A significant portion of the Utah portion of the route north of the Navajo Nation is inside the boundaries of the Bears Ears National Monument. Formerly, the route continued along what is now signed US 191 to I-70, however the portion north of Bluff was not signed after the creation of US 191 and was formally removed in 2008. The length of US 163 in Utah has been designated the Bluff to Monument Valley Scenic Byway by the Utah State Legislature and forms part of the Trail of the Ancients National Scenic Byway. All highways in Utah are codified in law; US 163 is defined at Utah Code §72-4-122(3). While Monument Valley and US 163 have been featured in numerous western movies, a specific view area near Utah mile marker 13 has recently been given the nickname Forrest Gump hill, as a location from the movie Forrest Gump. It has become common for fans of the film to re-create the scene where the title character ends a cross country jogging along this point on US 163.

== History ==
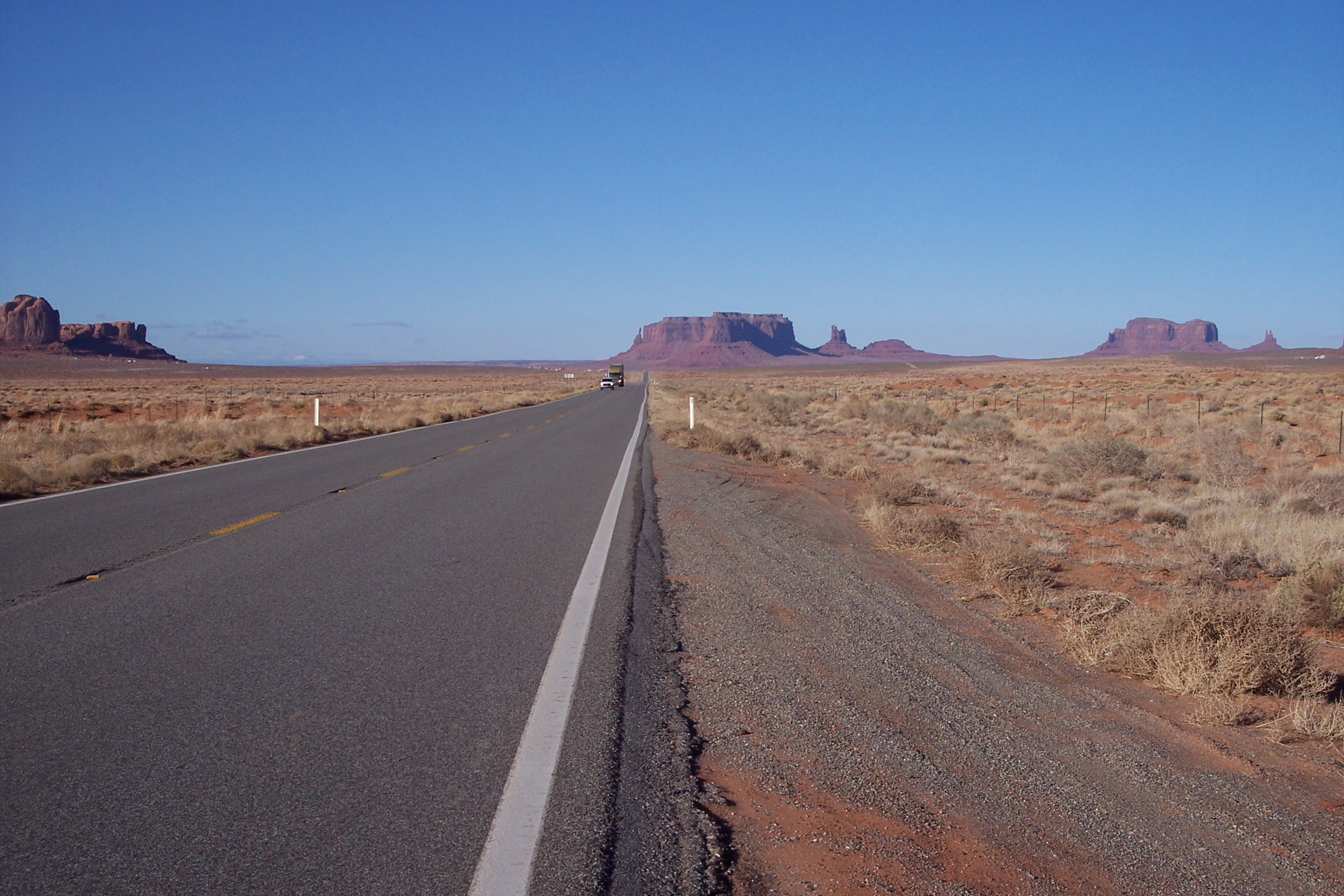
US 163 seen toward the northeast.

The modern routing of US 163 in Utah was initially designated as State Route 47, in 1910. SR 47 extended to Monticello at a junction with then U.S. Route 160. In Arizona, the road appeared on maps as early as 1935, but it was an unimproved dirt road. The Arizona portion was added to the state highway system in 1960 when it was designated as State Route 464.

In 1970, US 163 was designated along SR 464 in Arizona and SR 47 in Utah as part of a re-alignment of U.S. highways in the Four Corners region. With the re-alignment, US 160 was re-routed into Arizona instead of Utah. US 163 also absorbed the former route of US 160 to its former terminus at Interstate 70 at Crescent Junction. In 1981, AASHTO approved a new iteration of U.S. Route 191 that absorbed much of the alignment of US 163. Utah truncated US 163 at Bluff. The truncation was made without approval from AASHTO, as the AASHTO logs placed the northern terminus of US 163 at I-70 at Crescent Junction.

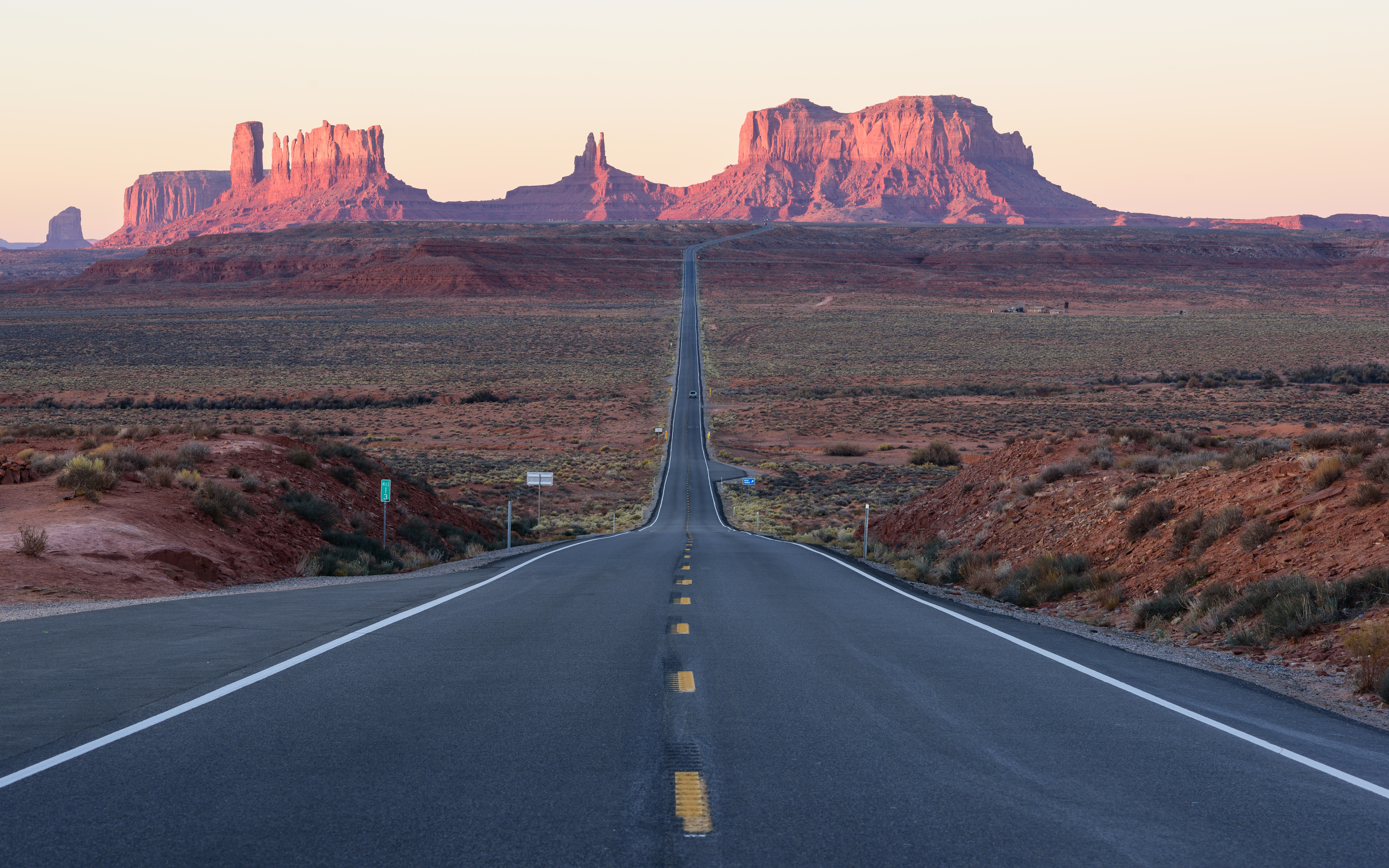
View of Monument Valley in Utah, looking south on US 163, nowadays called Forrest Gump Point

The state of Utah signed a joint intent with the Navajo Nation and San Juan County in 1986 to construct a new highway to connect Bluff with Montezuma Creek. Businesses in Monument Valley asked the Utah Department of Transportation (UDOT) to request extensions of US 163 and US 666 using this new road. The proposal would have US 163 run from Cedar City to US 160 near Cortez, Colorado along the routes of State Route 14, U.S. Route 89, Arizona State Route 98, U.S. Route 160, the current US 163, the new road from Bluff to Montezuma Creek, and Colorado State Highway 41. The proposal for US 666 would extend to Richfield via upgrades to State Route 95 and State Route 24. UDOT submitted the proposal for US 666 to AASHTO, which was rejected. AASHTO cited that the route was not direct, and SR-24 was not built to U.S. Highway standards. UDOT did not pursue the extension of US 163, even though the Utah state legislature had approved the new road from Bluff to Montezuma creek as route 163.

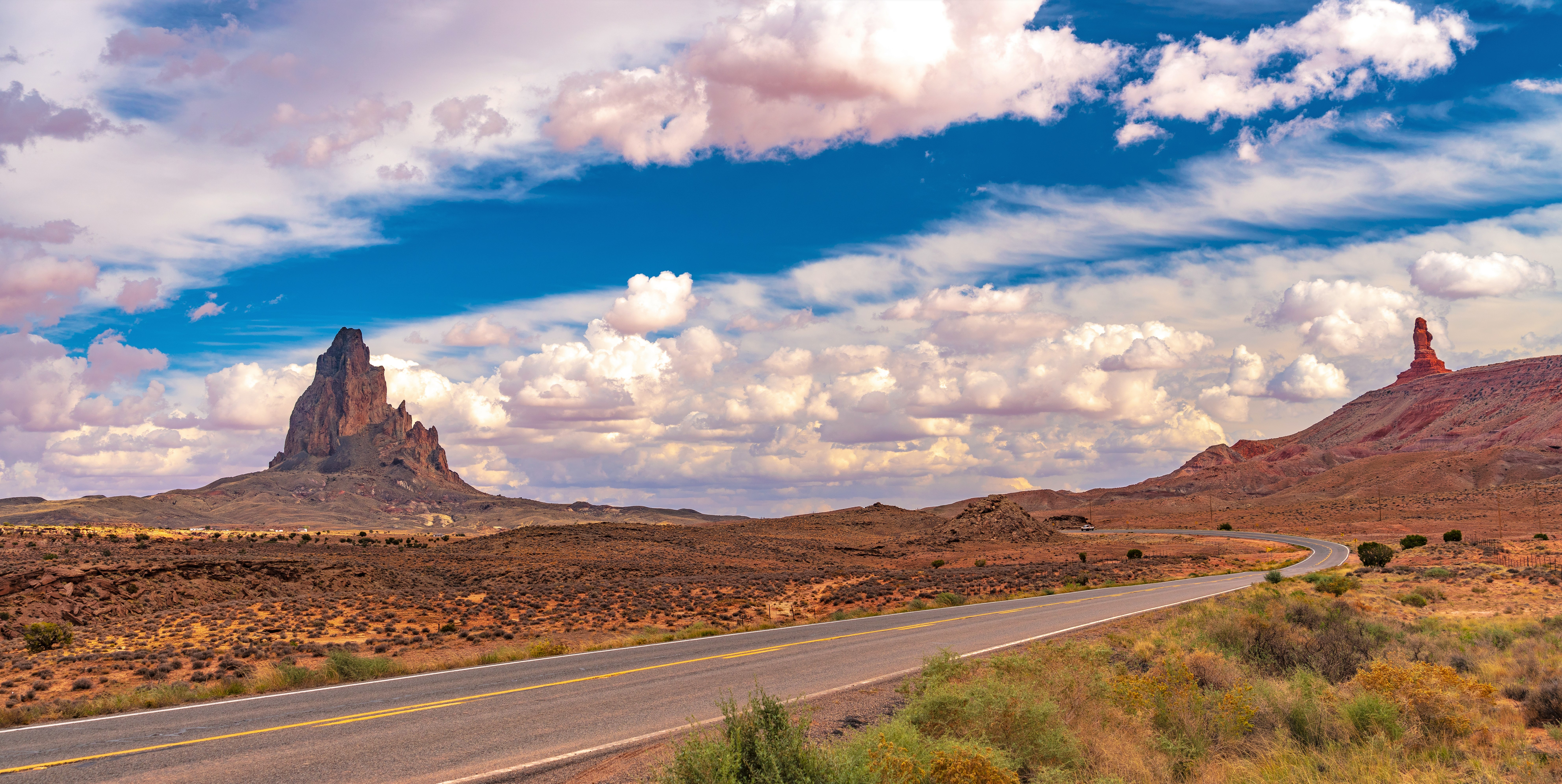
US 163 between Agathla Peak and Owl Rock as featured in Easy Rider

With this extension, the Utah definition of US 163 conflicted with the AASHTO definition. UDOT resolved this discrepancy by signing the extended portion as State Route 163. In 2004, the plan to extend US 163 was abandoned, and the extension was renumbered SR-162 to "make the state route numbers run synonymous with the U.S. route designation." Although the state changed the definition of US 163 back to match the national definition in 2004, the portion north of Bluff remained unsigned. In October 2008, UDOT requested and obtained approval to truncate US 163 to the junction with US 191 resolving the discrepancy.

The highway corridor became controversial in 2016 with the designation of Bears Ears National Monument. The area near where US 163 crosses the Comb Ridge was included in some versions of the monument proposal, but excluded as a concession to local concerns in other versions. The proclamation signed by President Obama in 2016 did not include the Comb Ridge area, however, was included with subsequent boundary changes by succeeding presidents.

== Junction list ==
State	County	Location	mi	km	Destinations	Notes
Arizona	Navajo	Kayenta	0.00	0.00	US 160 / BIA Route 591 south – Tuba City, Four Corners	Southern terminus; highway continues as BIA Route 591
			23.21 0.000	37.35 0.000	State line	
Utah	San Juan	Monument Valley	0.458	0.737	BIA Route 42 – Monument Valley Tribal Park Visitors Center	
Utah	San Juan	Mexican Hat	24.847	39.987	SR-261 north – Goosenecks State Park	
Utah	San Juan		41.405	66.635	US 191 (Trail of the Ancients) – Bluff, Mexican Water	Northern terminus; highway continues as US 191 north
1.000 mi = 1.609 km; 1.000 km = 0.621 mi

== See also ==
- List of appearances of Monument Valley in the media - US 163 is visible in several movies etc. filmed in Monument Valley
