= Mexican Hat, Utah =

Human settlement in Utah, USA

- CDP
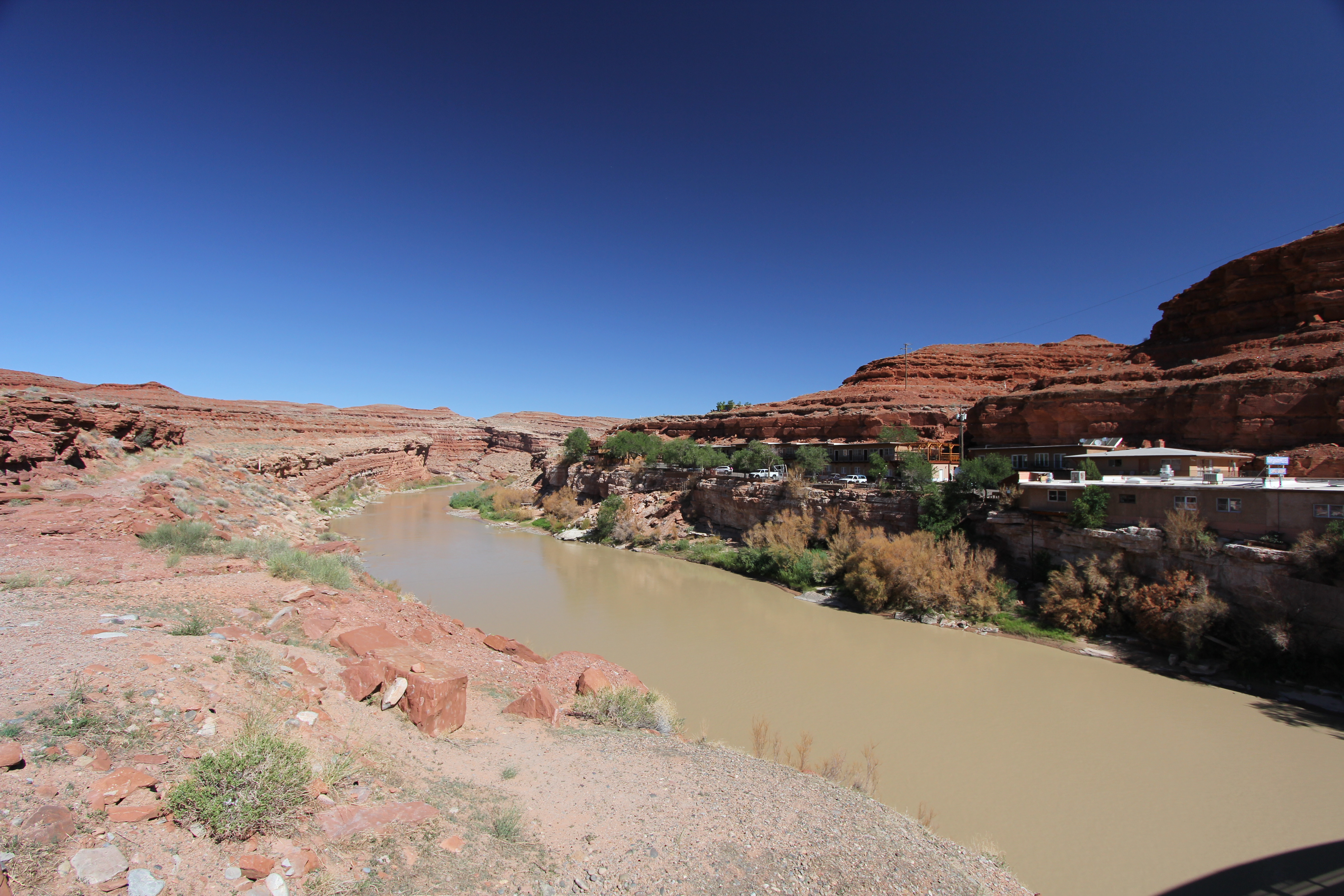
- Mexican Hat

- Location in San Juan County and the state of Utah.
- Coordinates: 37°10′34″N 109°52′40″W
- Country: United States
- State: Utah
- County: San Juan

Area
  - Total: 8.5 sq mi (22 km^{2})
  - Land: 8.2 sq mi (21 km^{2})
  - Water: 0.3 sq mi (0.78 km^{2})
- Elevation: 4,547 ft (1,386 m)

Population (2020)
  - Total: 21
  - Density: 3.9/sq mi (1.5/km^{2})
- Time zone: UTC-7 (Mountain (MST))
  - Summer (DST): UTC-6 (MDT)
- ZIP code: 84531
- Area code: 435
- FIPS code: 49-49380
- GNIS feature ID: 2408827

Mexican Hat is a census-designated place (CDP) in Utah in the United States. It is on the San Juan River on the northern edge of the Navajo Nation's borders in south-central San Juan County. As of the 2020 census, Mexican Hat had a population of 21.

== History ==
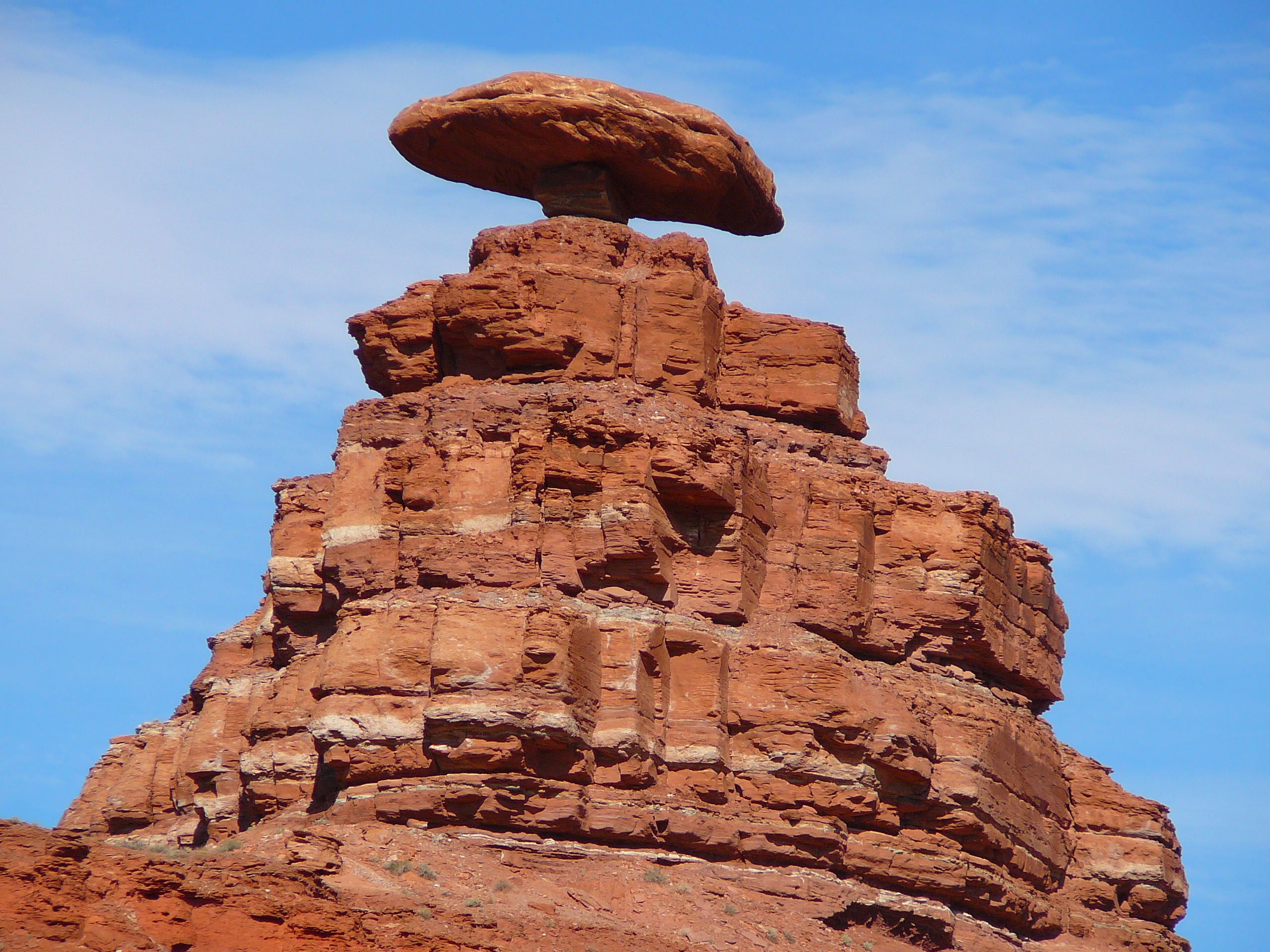
Mexican Hat Rock

The name "Mexican Hat" comes from a curiously sombrero-shaped rock outcropping on the northeast edge of town; the rock measures 60-foot (18 m) wide by 12-foot (3.7 m). The "Hat" has two rock climbing routes ascending it. Mexican Hat has frequently been noted on lists of unusual place names.

In 2016, the U.S. Route 163 bridge crossing the San Juan River on the southern border of the town was renamed the "Jason R. Workman Memorial Bridge", after a member of SEAL Team Six who was killed in action in Afghanistan on August 6, 2011. Workman was a 1997 graduate of the nearby San Juan High School.

== Geography ==
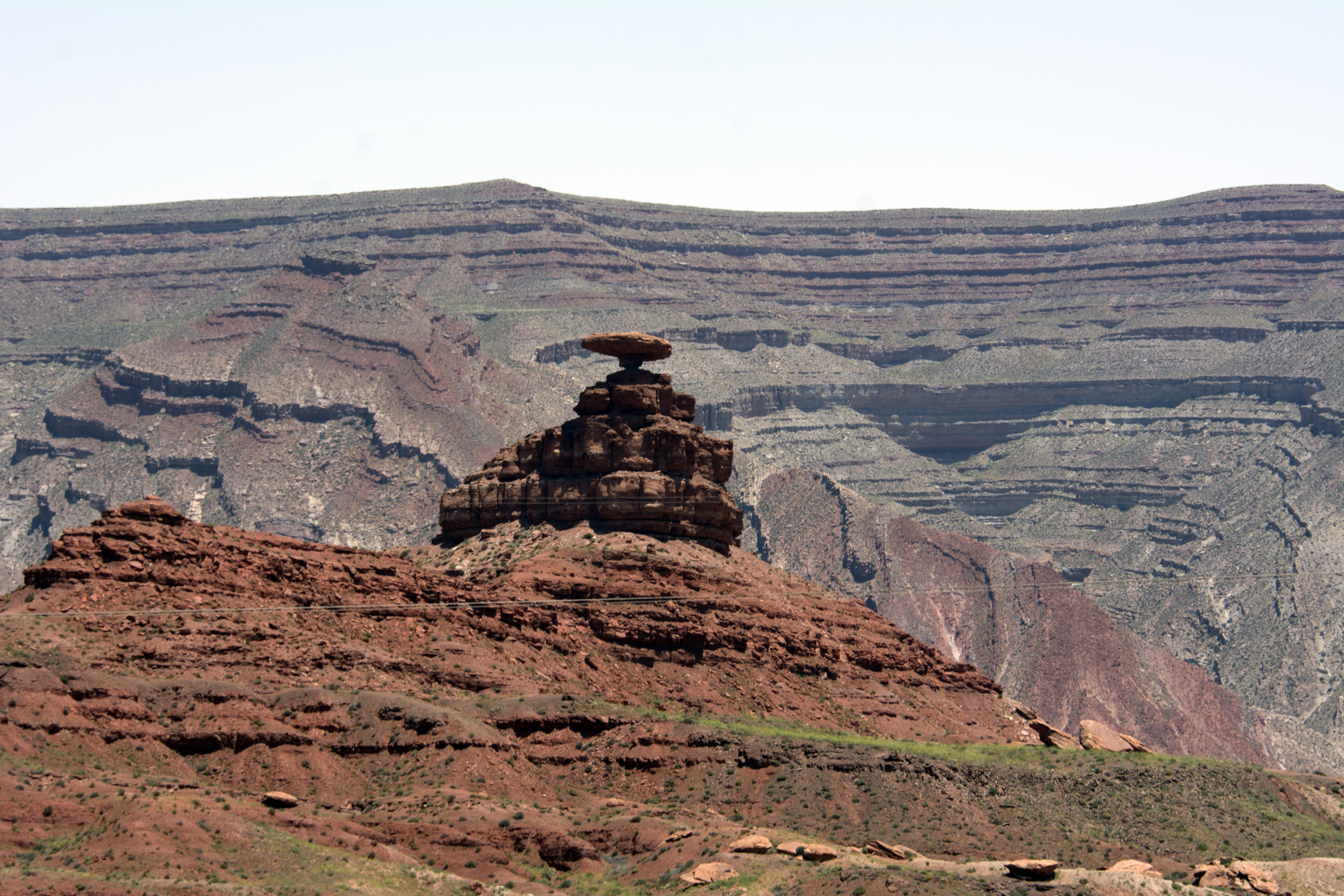
Mexican Hat Rock

The CDP is on U.S. Route 163, just 3 miles (5 km) south of the junction with State Route 261, and is just outside the northern boundary of both the Navajo Nation and Monument Valley. Goosenecks State Park is located 9 miles (14 km) west-northwest, Alhambra Rock is 6 miles (10 km) west-southwest, and the Valley of the Gods is to the north on U.S. 163.

According to the United States Census Bureau, the CDP has a total area of 8.5 square miles (22 km^{2}), of which 8.2 square miles (21 km^{2}) is land (96%) and 0.3 square miles (0.78 km^{2}) is water (4%).

=== Climate ===
According to the Köppen Climate Classification system, Mexican Hat has a semi-arid climate, abbreviated "BSk" on climate maps.

Climate data for Mexican Hat, Utah (1991–2020)
Month	Jan	Feb	Mar	Apr	May	Jun	Jul	Aug	Sep	Oct	Nov	Dec	Year
Mean daily maximum °F (°C)	46.5 (8.1)	53.4 (11.9)	64.0 (17.8)	72.1 (22.3)	82.4 (28.0)	94.6 (34.8)	99.1 (37.3)	96.0 (35.6)	88.1 (31.2)	74.1 (23.4)	58.3 (14.6)	46.2 (7.9)	72.9 (22.7)
Daily mean °F (°C)	34.6 (1.4)	40.1 (4.5)	48.7 (9.3)	56.3 (13.5)	66.5 (19.2)	77.2 (25.1)	84.0 (28.9)	81.3 (27.4)	72.2 (22.3)	58.4 (14.7)	44.4 (6.9)	34.3 (1.3)	58.2 (14.5)
Mean daily minimum °F (°C)	22.7 (−5.2)	26.8 (−2.9)	33.4 (0.8)	40.4 (4.7)	50.5 (10.3)	59.8 (15.4)	68.9 (20.5)	66.6 (19.2)	56.3 (13.5)	42.7 (5.9)	30.4 (−0.9)	22.3 (−5.4)	43.4 (6.3)
Average precipitation inches (mm)	0.67 (17)	0.60 (15)	0.44 (11)	0.31 (7.9)	0.49 (12)	0.19 (4.8)	0.54 (14)	0.74 (19)	0.82 (21)	0.66 (17)	0.42 (11)	0.45 (11)	6.33 (160.7)
Average snowfall inches (cm)	0.4 (1.0)	0.5 (1.3)	0.1 (0.25)	0.0 (0.0)	0.0 (0.0)	0.0 (0.0)	0.0 (0.0)	0.0 (0.0)	0.0 (0.0)	0.0 (0.0)	0.1 (0.25)	1.2 (3.0)	2.3 (5.8)
Source: NOAA

== Demographics ==
Historical population
Census	Pop.	Note	%±
1990	259		—
2000	88		−66.0%
2010	31		−64.8%
2020	21		−32.3%

As of the census of 2010, there were 31 people in 17 households residing in the CDP. The population density was 3.8 people per square mile (1.5/km^{2}). There were 23 housing units at an average density of 2.8/sq mi (1.1/km^{2}). The racial make-up of the CDP was 9.7% Native American and 90.3% White.

There were 17 households, out of which 5.9% had children under the age of 18 living with them, 29.4% were married couples living together, 17.6% had a female householder with no husband present, and 47.1% were non-families. 64.7% of all households were made up of individuals, and 5.9% had someone living alone who was 65 years of age or older. The average household size was 1.82 and the average family size was 2.56.

In the CDP, the population skewed older since the last census, with 6.4% under the age of 15, zero residents aged 15 to 24, 25.8% from 25 to 44, 25.9% from 45 to 64, and 42% who were 65 years of age or older. The median age was 54.5 years.

As of 2012, the median income for a household in the CDP was $80,767, and there were no families or individuals living below the poverty line.

As of the 2020 Census, 61.9% of the population is non-Hispanic White alone, 28.6% is non-Hispanic American Indian alone, 4.8% is non-Hispanic some other race alone, and 4.8% is Hispanic of any race.

== See also ==
- List of census-designated places in Utah
