= Utah State Route 261 =

State highway in Utah, United States

Coordinates: 37.2717635°N 109.9361948°W

State Route 261

Route information
- Maintained by UDOT
- Length: 32.961 mi (53.046 km)
- Existed: 1957–present

Major junctions
- South end: US 163 near Mexican Hat
- SR-316 near Goosenecks State Park
- North end: SR-95 near Natural Bridges National Monument

Location
- Country: United States
- State: Utah

Highway system
- Utah State Highway System; Interstate; US; State; Minor; Scenic
← SR-260	→ SR-262

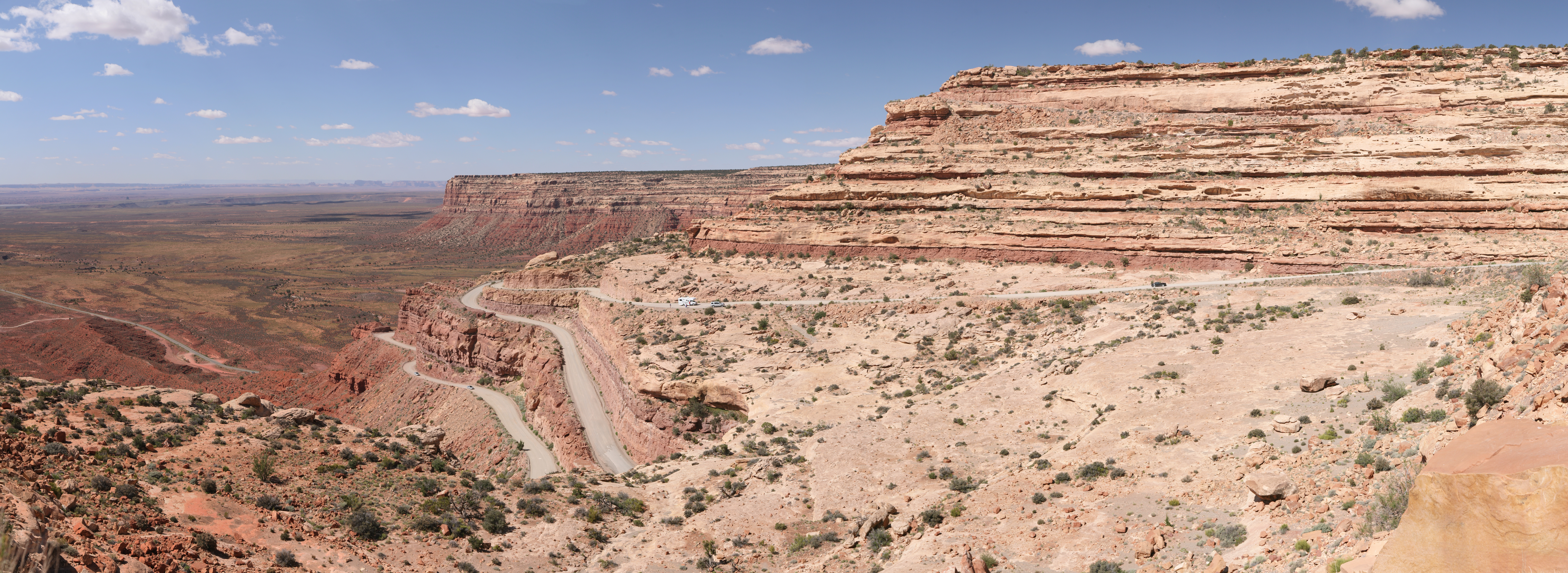
Moki Dugway.

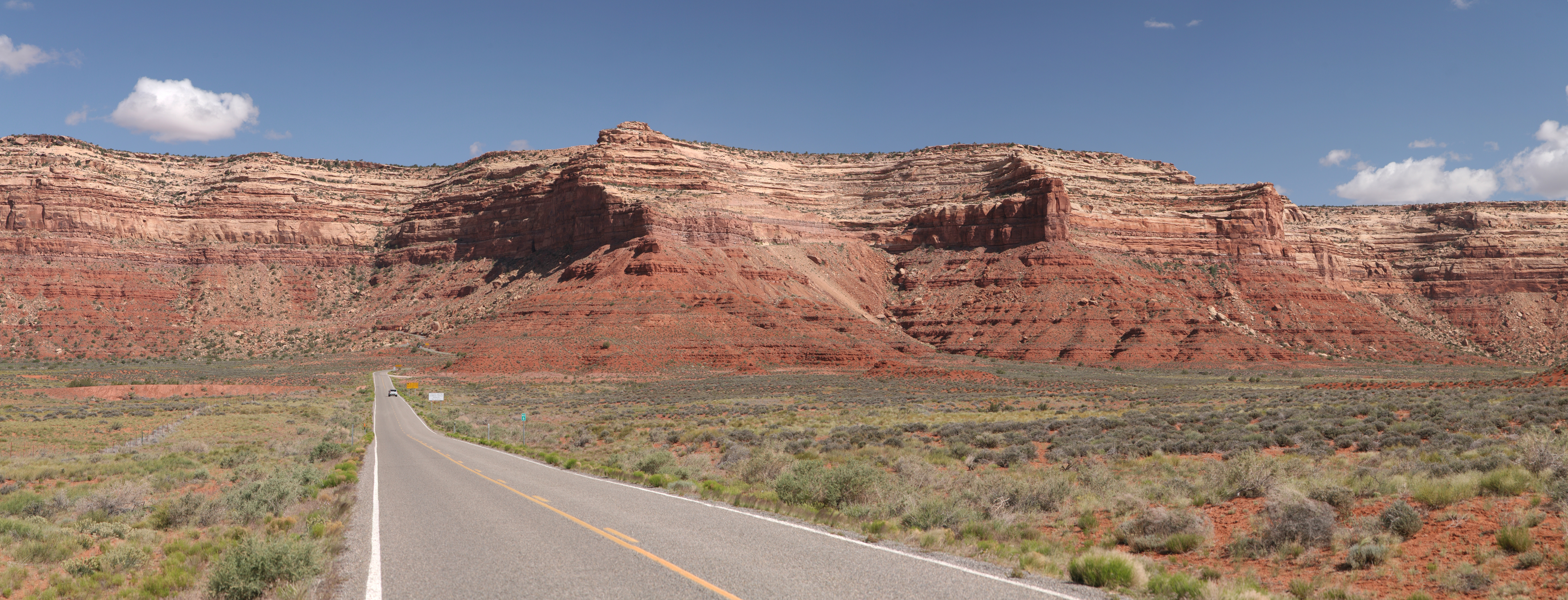
Approaching the Moki Dugway from the South.

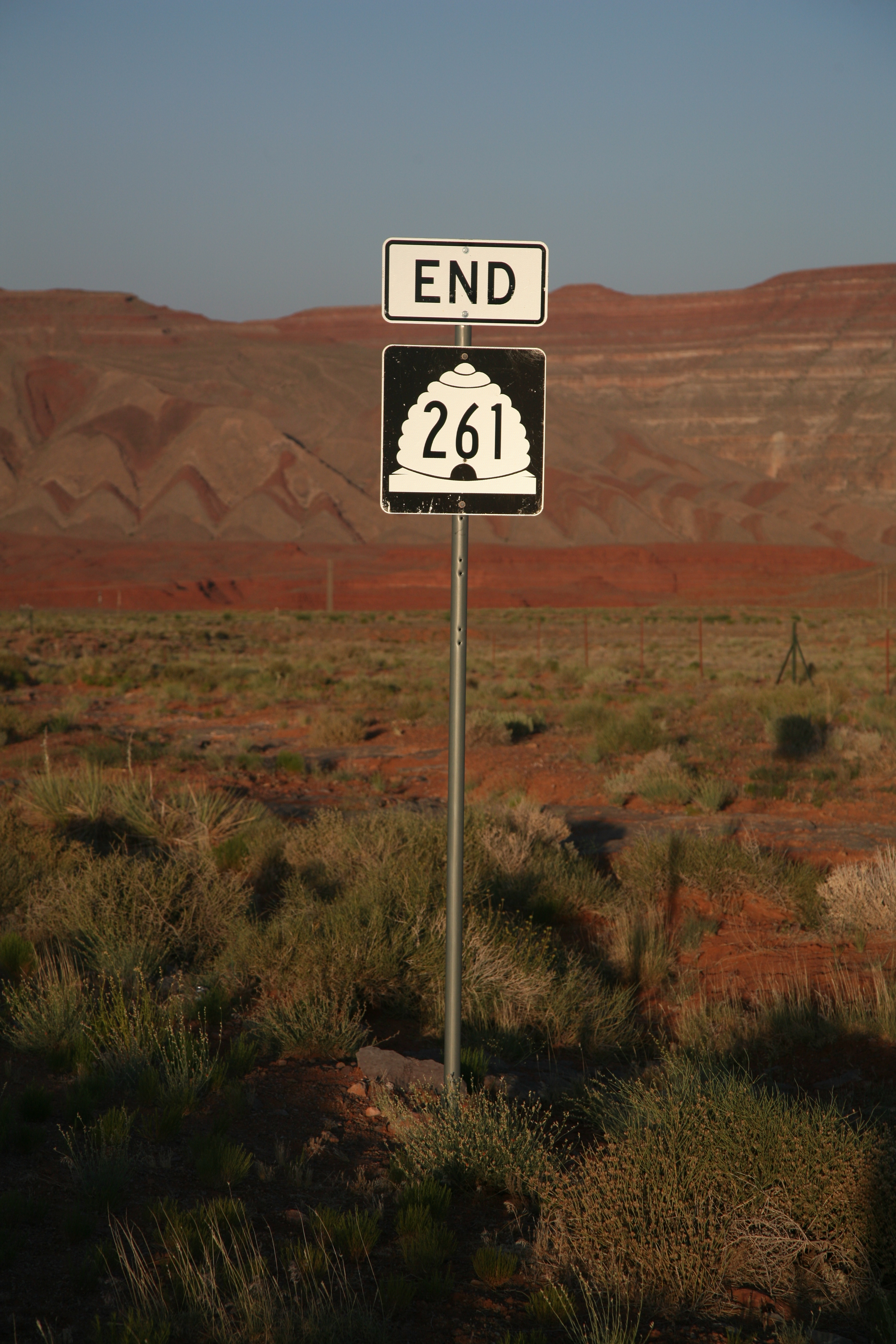
Southern terminus of SR-261

State Route 261 is a state highway located entirely within south-central San Juan County, Utah. It runs 34 miles (55 km) north, from the junction of U.S. Route 163 (3 miles (5 km) north of Mexican Hat), to the junction with State Route 95, just east of Natural Bridges National Monument.

The highway is part of the Utah section of the Trail of the Ancients, a National Scenic Byway. It includes steep switchbacks as it traverses the Moki Dugway.

== Route description ==
From its southern terminus north of Mexican Hat, SR-261 commences in a westerly direction. After turning north, the route encounters the Moki Dugway, becoming an unpaved road for its ascent up onto Cedar Mesa, only to return to being paved for the rest of the route to its terminus at SR-95 just east of Natural Bridges National Monument.

== History ==
The Moki Dugway was constructed in 1958 by Texas Zinc, a mining company, to transport uranium ore from the "Happy Jack" mine in Fry Canyon to the processing mill in Mexican Hat. The State Road Commission added SR-261 to the state highway system in 1957, following its present alignment from SR-47 (now US-163) north of Mexican Hat to SR-95.

== Major intersections ==
The entire route is in San Juan County.

Location	mi	km	Destinations	Notes
Mexican Hat	0.000	0.000	US 163	Southern terminus
	0.874	1.407	SR-316	
	32.691	52.611	SR-95	Northern terminus
1.000 mi = 1.609 km; 1.000 km = 0.621 mi
