= San Juan High School (Utah) =

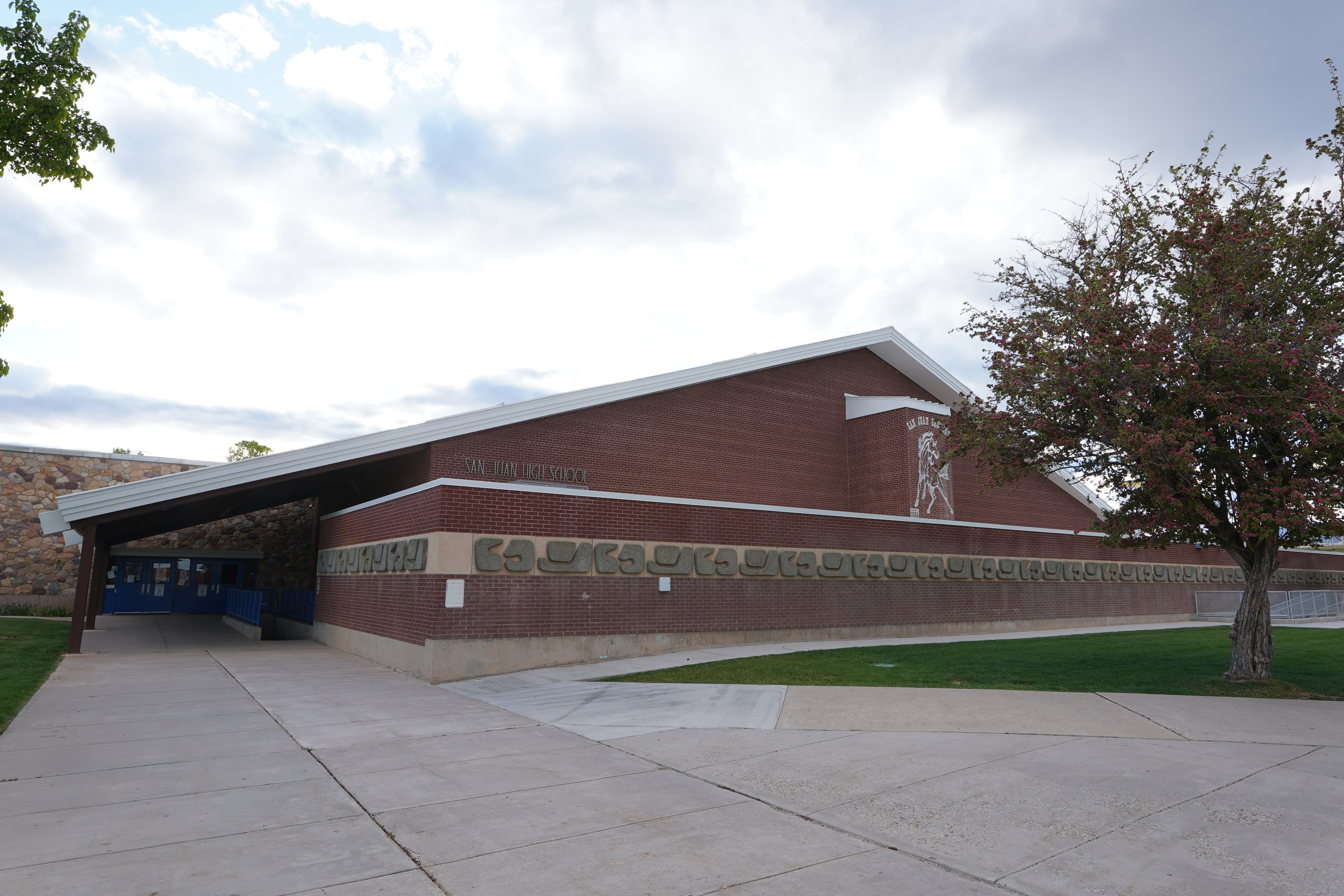

Location
- 311 North Bronco Blvd. Blanding, Utah 84511; United States; 37.629722°N 109.476944°W

Information
- School type: Public, high school
- NCES School ID: 490090000537
- Principal: Ryan Nielson
- Staff: 22.31 (FTE)
- Grades: 9–12
- Enrollment: 426 (2023-2024)
- Student to teacher ratio: 19.09
- Colors: Blue and gold
- Mascot: Broncos
- Website: www.sjsd.org/o/sjhs

San Juan High School is located in Blanding, Utah, United States. The school is in the San Juan School District, and serves grades 9–12. The schools colors are royal blue and gold. The mascot is a blue and gold horse named, Spirit who replaced Oat 'N Bow in 2017.

As a 2A school, San Juan High School is the largest high school in the San Juan County, Utah. Each graduating class has approx. 100 students.

== Clubs and sports ==
San Juan High School offers a variety of clubs and sports.

The clubs include:

- Art Club
- Band
- Blue Mountain Unity Club (Navajo Heritage)
- Choir
- Drama
- Educational Talent Search
- FBLA
- French
- FFA
- FMP
- Gamers Club
- Honor Society
- HOSA
- Hope Squad
- Interact
- Science Olympiad
- SkillsUSA
- Sterling Scholar
- Student Council
- Upward Bound
- Quiz Bowl

Sports and athletics include:

- Baseball
- Boys Basketball
- Boys Soccer
- Boys Tennis
- Cheerleading
- Cross Country
- Drill Team
- Football
- Girls Basketball
- Girls Soccer
- Girls Tennis
- Golf
- Softball
- Track & Field
- Volleyball
- Wrestling
