= Montezuma Creek (Utah) =

Montezuma Creek is a tributary of the San Juan River. The stream is approximately 73 miles (117 km) long and is a seasonal river, becoming dry for several months of the year.

== Location ==
Its headwaters are on the eastern slopes of the Abajo Mountains in southeastern Utah on the south edge of Monticello with the confluence of North Creek and South Creek at 37°51′33″N 109°20′35″W and an elevation of approximately 6920 feet. It flows east and south through Montezuma Canyon to the settlement that bears its name (Montezuma Creek) and flows into the San Juan River at 37°16′07″N 109°19′59″W and an elevation of 4400 feet.

== See also ==
- List of rivers of Utah
