= Aneth, Utah =

Aneth, Utah Tʼáá Bííchʼį́įdii (Navajo)
- CDP
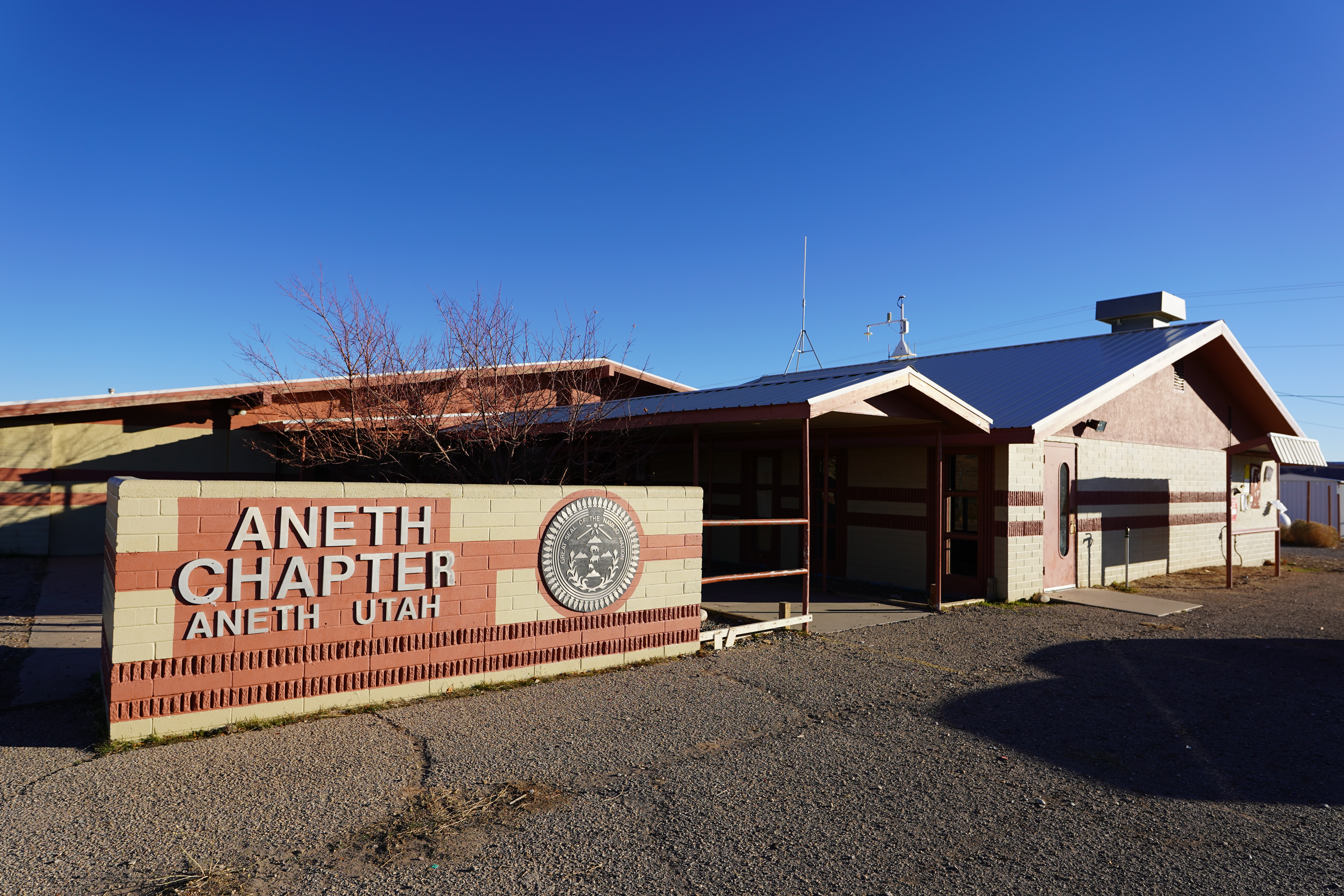
- Aneth Chapter House

- Location in San Juan County and the state of Utah.
- Coordinates: 37°11′30″N 109°08′35″W
- Country: United States
- State: Utah
- County: San Juan

Area
  - Total: 11.7 sq mi (30.4 km^{2})
  - Land: 11.4 sq mi (29.5 km^{2})
  - Water: 0.31 sq mi (0.8 km^{2})
- Elevation: 4,590 ft (1,400 m)

Population (2020)
  - Total: 427
  - Density: 52/sq mi (20.2/km^{2})
- Time zone: UTC-7 (Mountain (MST))
  - Summer (DST): UTC-6 (MDT)
- ZIP code: 84510
- Area code: 435
- FIPS code: 49-01530
- GNIS feature ID: 2407743

Aneth (Navajo: Tʼáá Bííchʼį́įdii) is a census-designated place (CDP) in San Juan County, Utah, United States. The population was 427 at the 2020 census. The origin of the name Aneth is obscure.

== Geography ==
According to the United States Census Bureau, the CDP has a total area of 11.7 square miles (30.4 km^{2}), of which 11.4 square miles (29.5 km^{2}) is land and 0.3 square miles (0.8 km^{2}) (2.73%) is water.

== Government ==
Kenneth Maryboy is the council delegate representing Aneth in the Navajo Nation Council.

Aneth is the site of the local government. It is the location of the meetings. The area under the local government is called Aneth Chapter, and is a part of the Navajo Nation's system of local governments known as chapter houses. Aneth Chapter is part of Navajo Nation and is located north of the San Juan River, stretching from Montezuma Creek to the Colorado state border, with disputed territories east of Bluff and along the northern border.

== Demographics ==
Languages (2000)	Percent
Spoke Navajo at home	84.16%
Spoke English at home	15.84%

As of the census of 2000, there were 598 people, 143 households, and 128 families residing in the CDP. The population density was 52.4 people per square mile (20.3/km^{2}). There were 177 housing units at an average density of 15.5/sq mi (6.0/km^{2}). The racial makeup of the CDP was 0.33% White, 0.17% African American, 98.83% Native American, and 0.67% from two or more races. Hispanic or Latino of any race were 0.67% of the population.

There were 143 households, out of which 49.7% had children under the age of 18 living with them, 55.2% were married couples living together, 29.4% had a female householder with no husband present, and 9.8% were non-families. 9.8% of all households were made up of individuals, and 2.8% had someone living alone who was 65 years of age or older. The average household size was 4.18 and the average family size was 4.44.

In the CDP, the population was spread out, with 42.6% under the age of 18, 10.4% from 18 to 24, 25.6% from 25 to 44, 16.4% from 45 to 64, and 5.0% who were 65 years of age or older. The median age was 23 years. For every 100 females, there were 75.9 males. For every 100 females age 18 and over, there were 64.9 males.

The median income for a household in the CDP was $17,292, and the median income for a family was $16,563. Males had a median income of $35,536 versus $13,333 for females. The per capita income for the CDP was $10,556. About 48.8% of families and 52.0% of the population were below the poverty line, including 64.0% of those under age 18 and none of those age 65 or over.

== History ==
The name Tʼáá Bííchʼį́įdii was the nickname of an Anglo storekeeper named J.B. Tanner who worked at a trading post in Aneth. The nickname means "just like a devil" in Navajo and was given to him by the local community due to his greedy business practices. He also worked in Yah-ta-hey, New Mexico, leading the Navajo to use the same name for both towns.

== Education ==
The San Juan School District operates the Montezuma Creek Elementary School in Aneth. In 2017 the school offered to give salaries of $80,000 to teachers with many years of experience who are designated as lead teachers.

== See also ==
- List of census-designated places in Utah
- List of communities in the Navajo Nation
