= Montezuma Creek, Utah =

Montezuma Creek, Utah Díwózhii Bikooh (Navajo)
- Census-designated place
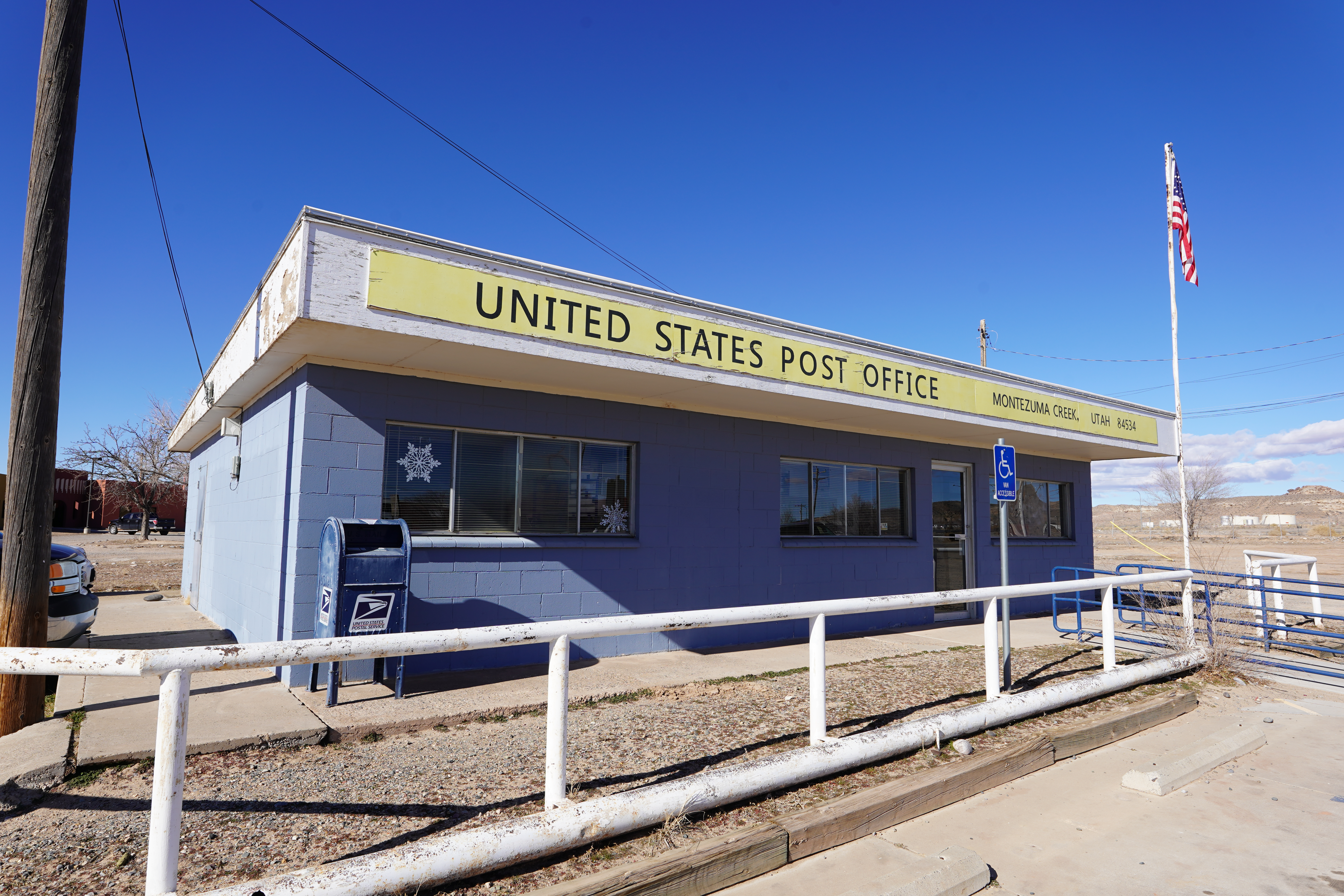
- U.S. Post Office in Montezuma Creek, January 2019

- Location in San Juan County and the state of Utah.
- Coordinates: 37°15′00″N 109°17′50″W
- Country: United States
- State: Utah
- County: San Juan

Area
  - Total: 12.5 sq mi (32.4 km^{2})
  - Land: 12.1 sq mi (31.4 km^{2})
  - Water: 0.42 sq mi (1.1 km^{2})
- Elevation: 4,413 ft (1,345 m)

Population (2020)
  - Total: 284
  - Density: 23.4/sq mi (9.04/km^{2})
- Time zone: UTC-7 (Mountain (MST))
  - Summer (DST): UTC-6 (MDT)
- ZIP code: 84534
- Area code: 435
- FIPS code: 49-51470
- GNIS feature ID: 2408862

Montezuma Creek (Navajo: Díwózhii Bikooh) is a census-designated place (CDP) in San Juan County, Utah, United States. The population was 284 at the 2020 census, a decrease from the 2010 figure of 335.

== Education ==
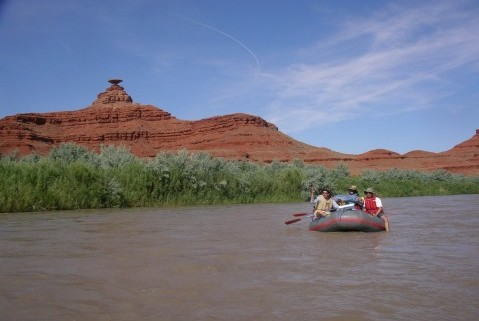
Rafting along the San Juan River, June 2006

Montezuma Creek also is the center of education of about 500 Navajos in the area. Schools in the area include Montezuma Creek Elementary School and Whitehorse Junior/Senior High School, both a part of the San Juan School District.

Whitehorse High is adjacent to the census-designated place,

== Geography ==
Montezuma Creek is located at the confluence of the stream Montezuma Creek with the San Juan River. The community is served by Utah State Routes 162 and 262.

According to the United States Census Bureau, the CDP has a total area of 12.5 square miles (32.4 km^{2}), of which 12.1 square miles (31.4 km^{2}) is land and 0.4 square mile (1.1 km^{2}) (3.27%) is water.

== Demographics ==
Historical population
| Census | Pop. | Note | %± |
|---|---|---|---|
| 1990 | 345 | | — |
| 2000 | 507 | | 47.0% |
| 2010 | 335 | | −33.9% |
| 2020 | 284 | | −15.2% |
Source: U.S. Census Bureau

As of the census of 2000, there were 507 people, 117 households, and 100 families residing in the CDP. The population density was 41.8 people per square mile (16.2/km^{2}). There were 170 housing units at an average density of 14.0/sq mi (5.4/km^{2}). The racial makeup of the CDP was 96.06% Native American, 2.76% White, 0.39% from other races, and 0.79% from two or more races. Hispanic or Latino of any race were 1.18% of the population.

There were 117 households, out of which 61.5% had children under the age of 18 living with them, 66.7% were married couples living together, 10.3% had a female householder with no husband present, and 13.7% were non-families. 12.0% of all households were made up of individuals, and 2.6% had someone living alone who was 65 years of age or older. The average household size was 4.33 and the average family size was 4.75.

In the CDP, the population was spread out, with 44.6% under the age of 18, 9.5% from 18 to 24, 27.6% from 25 to 44, 16.2% from 45 to 64, and 2.2% who were 65 years of age or older. The median age was 21 years. For every 100 females, there were 97.3 males. For every 100 females age 18 and over, there were 99.3 males.

The median income for a household in the CDP was $29,375, and the median income for a family was $30,208. Males had a median income of $27,292 versus $15,417 for females. The per capita income for the CDP was $6,920. About 31.2% of families and 33.0% of the population were below the poverty line, including 23.1% of those under age 18 and 100.0% of those age 65 or over.

== Government ==
Davis Filfred and Kenneth Maryboy are the local delegates to the Navajo Nation Council.

== See also ==
- List of census-designated places in Utah
- Navajo Nation
- Navajo people
