= Square Top =

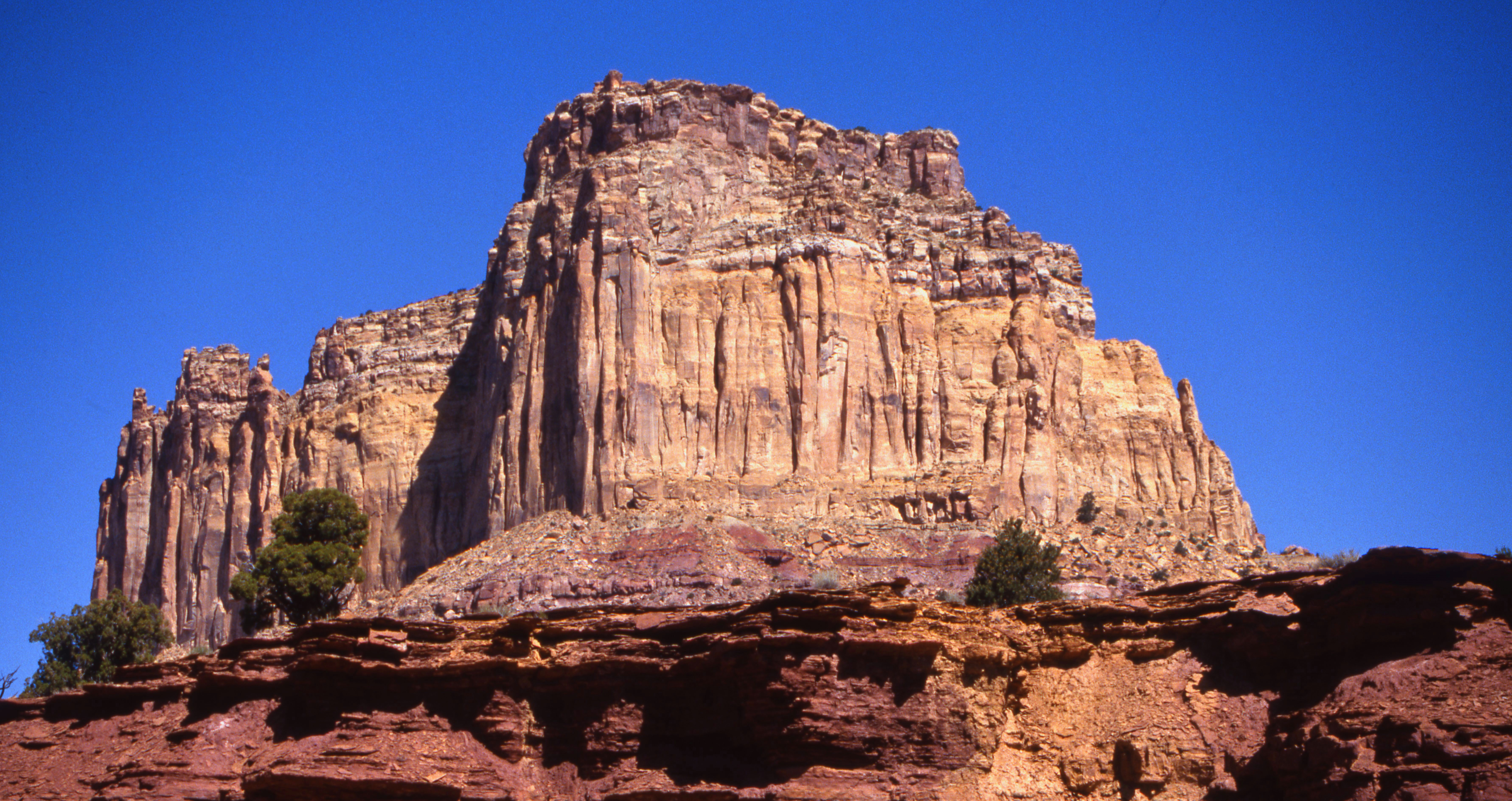
- Southeast aspect

Highest point
- Elevation: 7,412 ft (2,259 m)
- Prominence: 699 ft (213 m)
- Parent peak: Peak 7628
- Isolation: 2.31 mi (3.72 km)
- Coordinates: 38°46′28″N 110°53′44″W

Geography
- Location within Utah Location within the United States
- Country: United States
- State: Utah
- County: Emery
- Parent range: Colorado Plateau; San Rafael Swell
- Topo map: USGS Copper Globe

Geology
- Rock age: Triassic
- Rock type: Sandstone

Climbing
- Easiest route: class 5.9 climbing

Square Top is a 7,412-foot-elevation (2,259-meter) summit in Emery County, Utah, United States.

== Description ==
Square Top is located 29 miles (47 km) north-northwest of Hanksville, Utah, in Reds Canyon of the San Rafael Swell on land managed by the US Bureau of Land Management. Precipitation runoff from this landform drains into Reds Canyon → Muddy Creek → Dirty Devil River → Colorado River. Topographic relief is significant as the summit rises 1,200 feet (366 meters) above the canyon floor in 0.5 miles (0.80 km). Access is via Red Canyon Loop (County Road 1019). This landform's toponym has been officially adopted by the United States Board on Geographic Names.

== Geology ==
Square Top is composed of Kayenta Formation overlaying cliff-forming Wingate Sandstone, which is the remains of wind-borne sand dunes deposited approximately 200 million years ago in the Late Triassic. Below the Wingate are strata of the upper and lower members of the slope-forming Chinle Formation, also of Late Triassic age. The Chinle overlies the Moody Canyon and Torrey members of the Moenkopi Formation (Early Triassic) which covers the surrounding terrain. These rocks were uplifted during the Laramide Orogeny and subjected to forces of erosion which created the butte left standing today.

== Climate ==
Spring and fall are the most favorable seasons to visit Square Top. According to the Köppen climate classification system, it is located in a cold semi-arid climate zone, with temperatures averaging between 0 °F to 30 °F in January, and 50 °F to 100 °F in July. Typical of high deserts, summer temperatures can be exceedingly hot, while winter temperatures can be very cold. Snowfall is common, but the snow melts rapidly in the arid and sunny climate. Rainfall is very low, and the evaporation rate classifies the area as desert, even though the rainfall exceeds 10 inches.
