= Quitchupah Creek =

Coordinates: 38°48′49″N 111°14′37″W

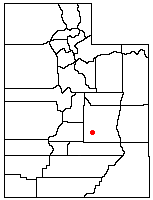
Location of Quitchupah Creek, Utah

Quitchupah (or Quitchumpah) Creek is a stream draining portions of Emery and Sevier Counties in central Utah, in the western United States. Quitchupah Creek is significant for rock art remains of the Fremont culture that line its banks. Quitchupah is Ute for "animals fare poorly." The drainage area is located within the Colorado River Basin near the south end of the Wasatch Plateau. All drainage from the area flows to Quitchupah Creek or its tributaries, including East Spring Canyon, Water Hollow, and North Fork and flows through Convulsion Canyon.

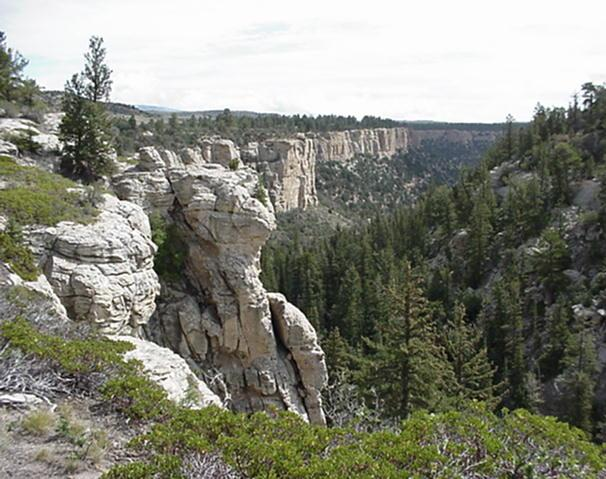
Quitchupah Canyon

It begins at an elevation of 9,000 feet (2,700 m) above sea level. It exits Convulsion Canyon and crosses under Utah State Route 10, south of the town of Emery, and then flows southeasterly and intersects with Ivie Creek, which ultimately merges with Muddy Creek and passing the Hidden Splendor Mine area, it passes through the San Rafael Reef at the Muddy Creek Gorge. Finally, after an estimated length of 100 miles (160 km) and a drop of 6000 feet (1825 m), it combines with the Fremont River to form the Dirty Devil River just north of the town of Hanksville. The Old Spanish Trail crossed Quitchupah Creek. Mormon settlers moved along its banks in the 1880s, but the settlement was later abandoned. Quitchupah Creek was recently in the news for a proposed road along the creek from Convulsion Canyon coal mines to Utah State Route 10.

== See also ==
- List of rivers of Utah
