= Interstate 70 in Utah =

Section of Interstate highway in Utah

Interstate 70
- I-70 highlighted in red

Route information
- Maintained by UDOT
- Length: 231.673 mi (372.842 km)
- Existed: 1957–present
- NHS: Entire route

Major junctions
- West end: I-15 near Cove Fort
- US 89 near Joseph; US 50 / US 89 in Salina; US 6 / US 191 near Green River; US 191 at Crescent Junction
- East end: I-70 / US 6 / US 50 at the Colorado state line near Westwater Canyon

Location
- Country: United States
- State: Utah
- Counties: Millard, Sevier, Emery, Grand

Highway system
- Interstate Highway System; Main; Auxiliary; Suffixed; Business; Future; Utah State Highway System; Interstate; US; State; Minor; Scenic
← SR-68	→ SR-71

Interstate 70 (I-70) is a mainline route of the Interstate Highway System in the United States connecting Utah and Maryland. The Utah section runs east–west for approximately 232 miles (373 km) across the central part of the state. Richfield is the largest Utah city served by the freeway, which does not serve or connect any urban areas in the state. The freeway was built as part of a system of highways connecting Los Angeles and the Northeastern United States. I-70 was the second attempt to connect southern California to the east coast of the United States via central Utah, the first being a failed attempt to construct a transcontinental railroad. Parts of that effort were reused in the laying out of the route of I-70.

Unlike most Interstate Highways, much of I-70 in Utah was not constructed parallel to or on top of an existing U.S. Route. Portions of I-70 were constructed in areas where previously there were no paved roads. Because it was built over an entirely new route, I-70 has many features that are unique in the Interstate Highway System. For example, the 110 miles (180 km) stretch between Green River and Salina makes up the longest distance anywhere in the Interstate Highway System with no motorist services. This same piece is noted as the longest highway in the United States built over a completely new route since the Alaska Highway, and the longest section of Interstate Highway to open at a given time. The construction of the Utah portion of I-70 is listed as one of the engineering marvels of the Interstate Highway System.

The choice of the route had a significant impact on the character and culture of the Sevier Valley. It has also been a motivating factor for environmentalists to create a new national park along the path of the highway to protect scenic areas around the route. I-70 from Green River to Grand Junction, Colorado, is part of the Dinosaur Diamond Prehistoric Highway, making I-70 one of the few Interstate Highways to be named a National Scenic Byway. Attractions listed by the Federal Highway Administration (FHWA) for the Dinosaur Diamond Prehistoric Highway on or near I-70 include, Arches National Park, Canyonlands National Park, Cleveland-Lloyd Dinosaur Quarry, Goblin Valley State Park, Ruby Canyon, and Westwater Canyon. The designation also lists several side roads branching from I-70 that lead to dinosaur bones, footprints, and native petroglyphs.

== Route description ==
I-70 begins at a trumpet interchange with I-15, near Cove Fort. It then proceeds east over the Pahvant Range, cresting at Clear Creek Summit with an elevation of 7,180 feet (2,190 m). The eastern descent from the Pahvant Range features bridges high above Clear Creek and its side canyons. The longest of these bridges is the Fish Creek bridge at 1,180 feet (360 m) long. The descent into Clear Creek features a brake check area and runaway truck ramp to aid truckers down the steep slope. The freeway then skirts the edge of Fremont Indian State Park and Museum before entering Sevier Valley.

=== Sevier Valley ===
I-70 serves as the main thoroughfare of the valley, the only area traversed by the highway in Utah with more than a few hundred residents. Richfield is the largest city along I-70 in the state. The highway enters the valley just north of Big Rock Candy Mountain, a mountain named for a song attributed to Harry McClintock. The highway proceeds northeast along the western edge of the valley, passing to the west of the communities of the valley, including Joseph, Monroe, Elsinore, and Richfield. As I-70 approaches Salina, it cuts across the valley passing to the south of the town. The highway avoids the downtown areas of all of these cities. The portion between Richfield and Salina is the busiest, with an annual average daily traffic (AADT) of 11,535 vehicles in 2006. In the Sevier Valley, I-70 was built parallel to U.S. Route 89; both highways now run concurrently between exit 23 (US-89 south to Marysvale and Panguitch) and exit 56 in Salina.

=== Wasatch Plateau ===
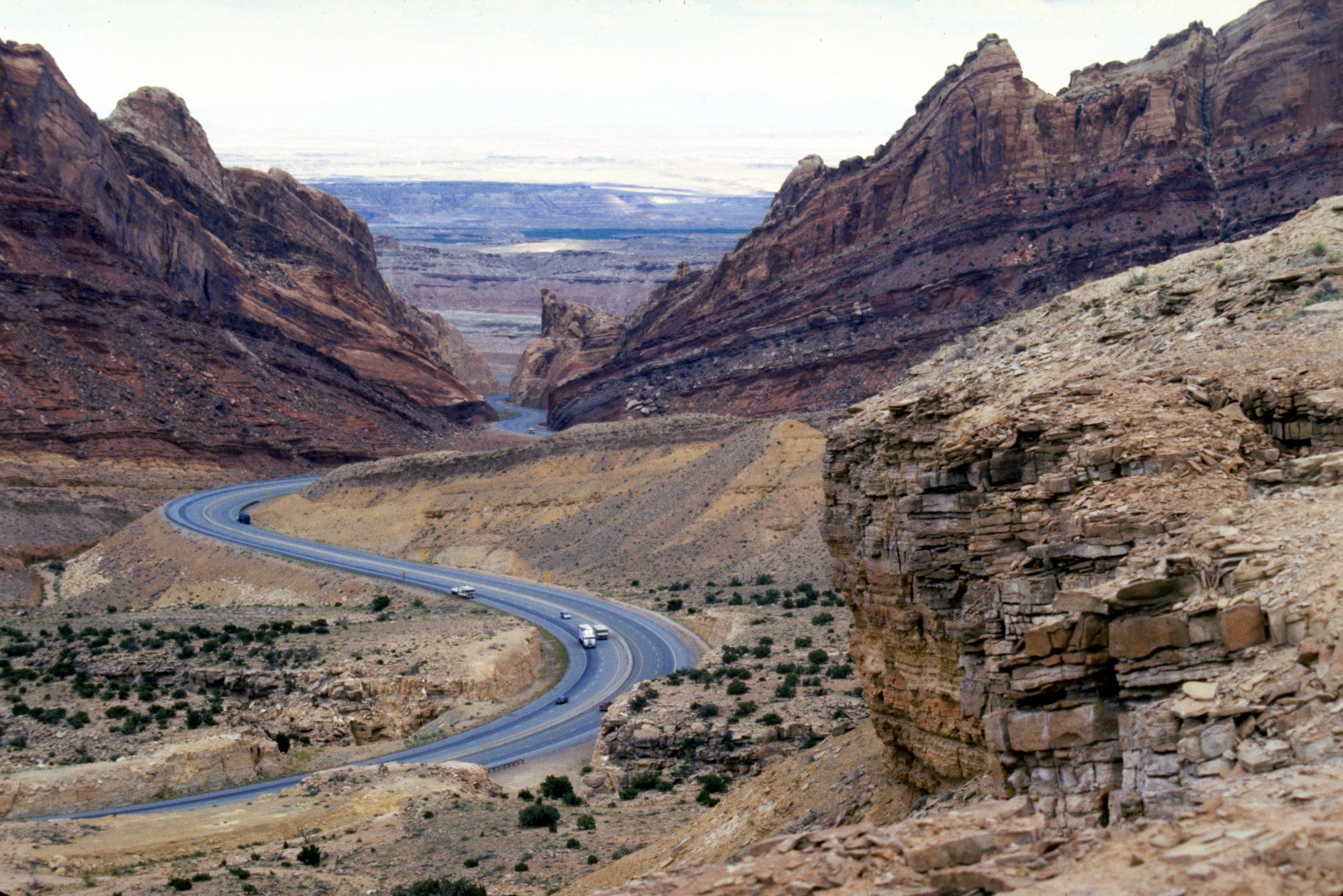
I-70 routed through Spotted Wolf Canyon

At Salina, US-50 joins I-70, and the two highways run concurrent for the rest of the way through Utah. After leaving exit 56 in Salina, I-70 departs on a 104-mile (167 km) course to the first Green River offramp, exit 160. Though there are a number of exits in between the two cities, it is the longest distance in the Interstate Highway System with no motorist services directly along the highway. The route to Green River crosses two major geographic obstacles: the Wasatch Plateau and the San Rafael Swell.

I-70 initially begins an ascent up the Wasatch Plateau via Salina Canyon. At lower elevations, this canyon separates the Wasatch Plateau to the north with the Sevier Plateau to the south. After climbing to a fork in the canyon, the highway turns south and crests the Wasatch Plateau at Emigrant Pass. This pass is the highest point of any of Utah's Interstate Highways, although the elevation differs from source to source. Newer Utah Department of Transportation (UDOT) maps list the elevation of 7,886 feet (2,404 m), while older maps give the figure 7,923 feet (2,415 m). This portion of I-70 is on protected lands as part of Fishlake National Forest. The highway exits the Wasatch Plateau at Fremont Junction, where I-70 meets Utah State Route 10 (SR-10).

=== San Rafael Swell ===
Between Fremont Junction and the junction of SR-24 near Green River, I-70 crosses a geologic feature called the San Rafael Swell. The construction of the highway through the swell is listed as one of the engineering marvels of the Interstate Highway System, with one engineer claiming this section as "one of the most significant highway construction feats of its time". The construction of I-70 through the swell required boring through many solid rock canyons, cliffs, and mountains. The swell is noted for its sheer canyons and rock formations and is home to a large amount of exposed dinosaur remains. This includes the largest known collection of Jurassic-period dinosaur remains at the Cleveland-Lloyd Dinosaur Quarry at the north end of the swell.

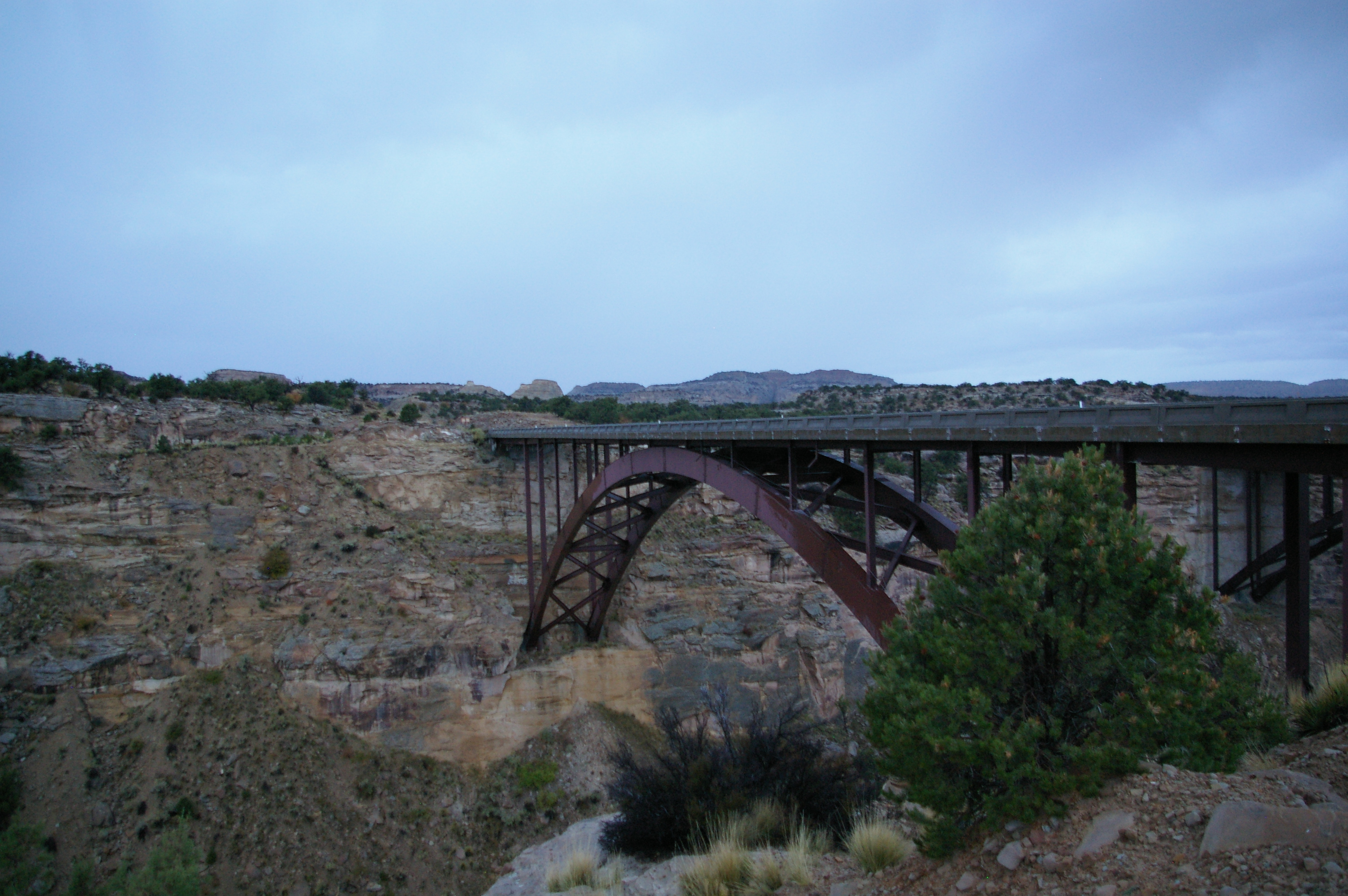
I-70 crossing Eagle Canyon inside the San Rafael Swell

The highway ascends the western edge of the swell on a steady slope loosely following the north rim of Devils Canyon. At the top of the grade is a view area with a view of Devils Canyon and an overlook of the landscape west of the swell. It then crosses Eagle Canyon via a pair of steel arch bridges. The eastbound bridge is 489 feet (149 m) long, and the westbound bridge is 523 feet (159 m) long.

The highway then ascends Ghost Rock Summit, named for unusual rock formations nearby, and the highest point for I-70 inside the swell. At the summit is another view area overlooking the Little Grand Canyon of the San Rafael River. The Ghost Rocks themselves are at 7,405 feet (2,257 m), although the freeway is slightly lower. I-70 meanders through a relatively flat portion of the swell until reaching Spotted Wolf Canyon, which provides the exit route to the swell. The eastern descent features one brake check area and two runaway truck ramps to aid trucks down. About halfway down is a view area of the canyon narrowing as it approaches the eastern escarpment of the swell, the San Rafael Reef. Just as the highway exits the swell near Green River, it passes to the north of Goblin Valley State Park.

=== Book Cliffs ===
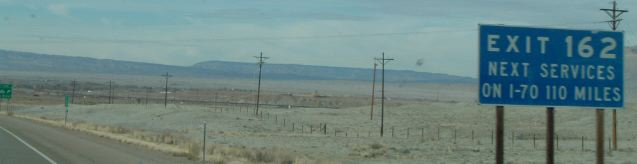
A sign reading, "Next services on I-70 110 miles [180 km]", near Green River

West of Green River, US-6 and US-191 join I-70. Also at Green River, the freeway reaches the southern edge of the Book Cliffs, a mountain range which I-70 follows to Grand Junction, Colorado. This portion of I-70 is part of the Dinosaur Diamond Prehistoric Highway, recognized as a scenic byway by both the National Scenic Byways and Utah Scenic Byways programs. Listed attractions along the byway in the Green River area include Crystal Geyser, Capitol Reef National Park, and Green River State Park.

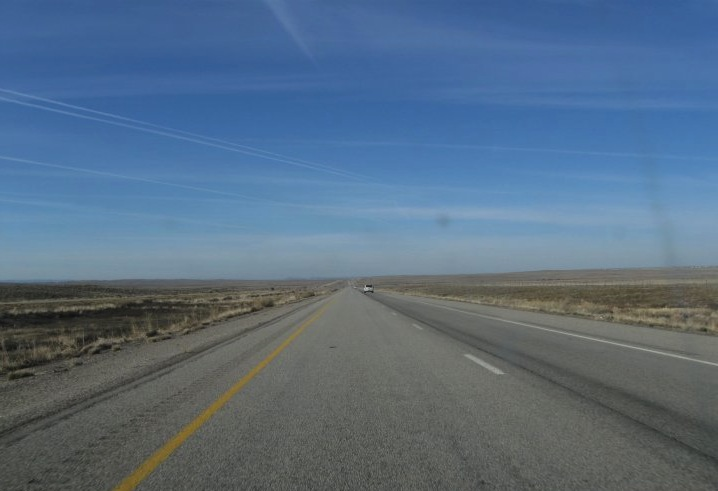
Looking west on I-70 across Sagers Flat

From this point east, the freeway is routed across a flat area between the Book Cliffs and the Colorado River, called Sagers Flat. Along the way, it passes by the towns of Crescent Junction, Thompson Springs, and the ghost town of Cisco. Natural features visible from this portion include Arches National Park and Castle Valley. Other listed attractions along the byway near this section include Canyonlands National Park and various areas with Morrison Formation, a layer of rock where dinosaur remains are common. I-70, US-6, and US-50 all enter Colorado concurrently. Where I-70 follows the Book Cliffs, it was built parallel to or on top of US-6/US-50.

== History ==
=== Old Spanish Trail ===
The first route through this portion of Utah was the Old Spanish Trail, a trade route between Santa Fe, New Mexico, and Los Angeles, California. The trail was in common use before the Mexican–American War in 1848. Although the trail serves a different route than I-70, they were both intended to connect Southern California with points further east. I-70 generally parallels the route of the Old Spanish Trail west of Crescent Junction. I-15 south of the junction with I-70 also generally parallels the trail.

=== Transcontinental railroads ===
The first attempt to build a modern trade route through the area is credited to William Jackson Palmer, founder of the Denver and Rio Grande Western Railroad (D&RG). Palmer started a project in 1880 to make what had been a local railroad from Colorado into a transcontinental railroad empire. This would mean a second transcontinental railroad would be built across Utah. This would also place the D&RG in competition with the first transcontinental railroad, then operated by the Union Pacific Railroad and Central Pacific Railroad.

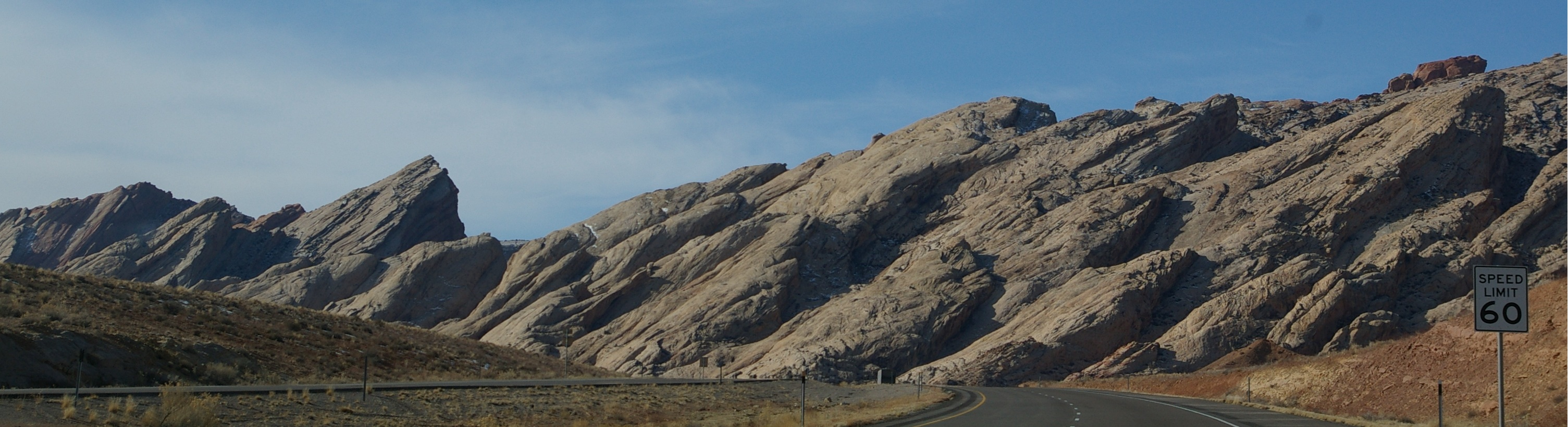
The San Rafael Reef as seen from I-70

Disagreements in the company led to two proposals. Both proposals called for extending the railroad west from Colorado as far as what is now Green River. West of Green River, a "northern route" would extend the railroad towards Ogden, Utah, there connecting with the established Overland Route. This proposal was eventually completed as the Utah Division, loosely following the route of modern US-6 across eastern Utah. This line soon became the main line of the D&RG and remains one of the main transcontinental rail arteries of the US, now operated by the Union Pacific Railroad as the Central Corridor.

The second proposal was a "southern route" that would continue due west from Green River and head toward Los Angeles, similar to the route of modern I-70. This proposal would require extending the railroad farther west, to connect with what would become the Los Angeles and Salt Lake Railroad.

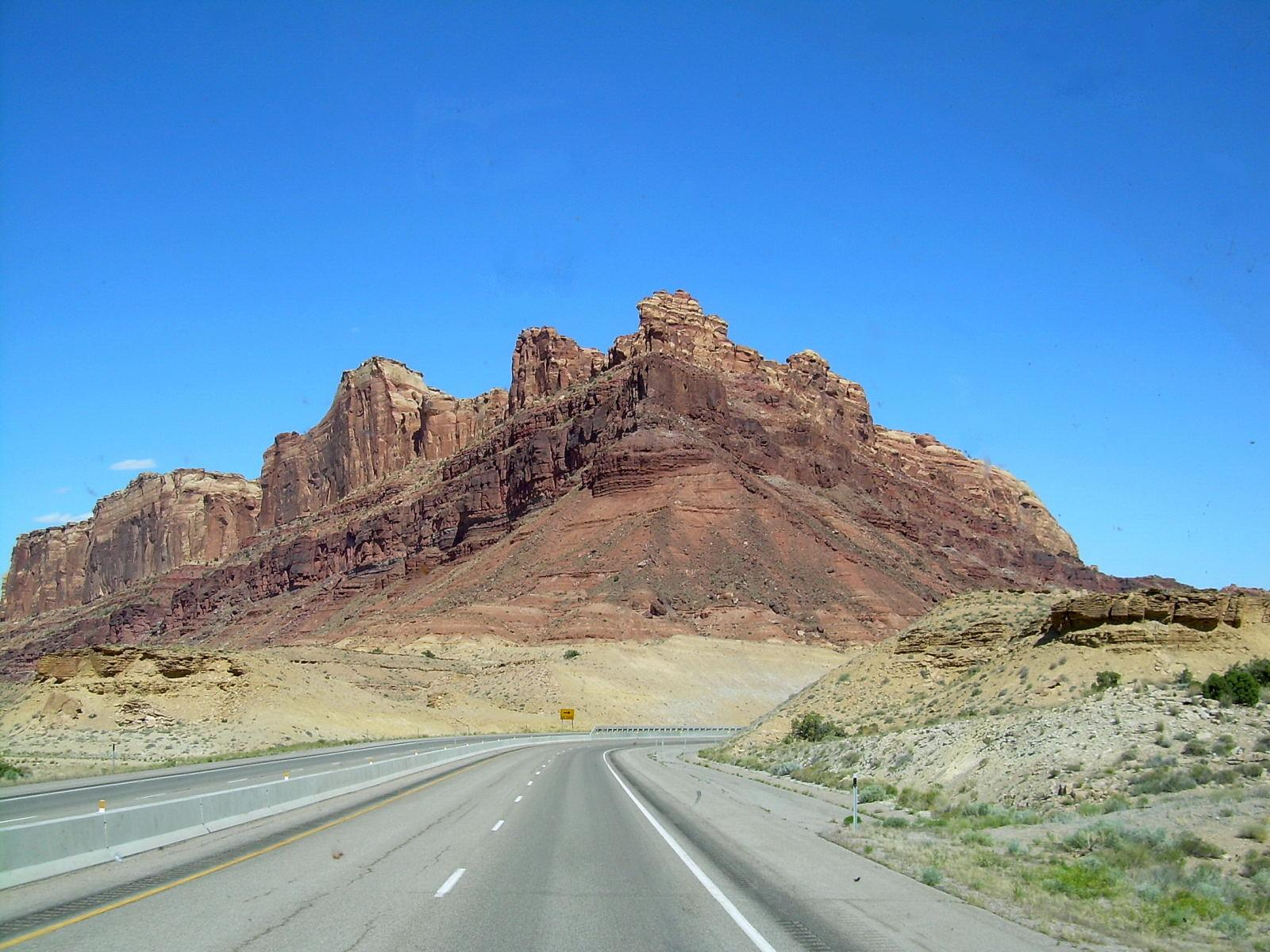
Inside the San Rafael Swell

Due to disagreements in management and poor communication, construction began on both routes. It was soon obvious that the southern route was unfeasible given the remote area, technology available at the time, and the rough terrain of the San Rafael Swell. In 1883, the D&RG spent $217,470 (equivalent to $6.2 million in 2024) on the project before declaring it a failure. One of the accounts in the book Utah Ghost Rails states the railroad fired the lead surveyor, even though the workers had graded a path past the San Rafael Reef. This route today is a jeep trail. According to a sign placed by the Bureau of Land Management (BLM), had the southern route succeeded, it would have been the shortest transcontinental railroad in the US.

Construction resumed in 1901 on a portion of the southern route, to build a spur line to service coal mines on the Wasatch Plateau. The railroad branched from an existing line at Salina and traveled east up Salina Canyon. After the mines closed, the railroad bed was used to improve SR-10, between Salina and Fremont Junction. I-70 would later use the railroad bed for a path across the Wasatch Plateau.

=== Planning ===
By the time the Interstate Highway System was in the planning stages, no paved road had yet entered the San Rafael Swell. The established highway through the area was US-6/US-50 which, like the railroad, entered Utah from Colorado and turned north around the swell.

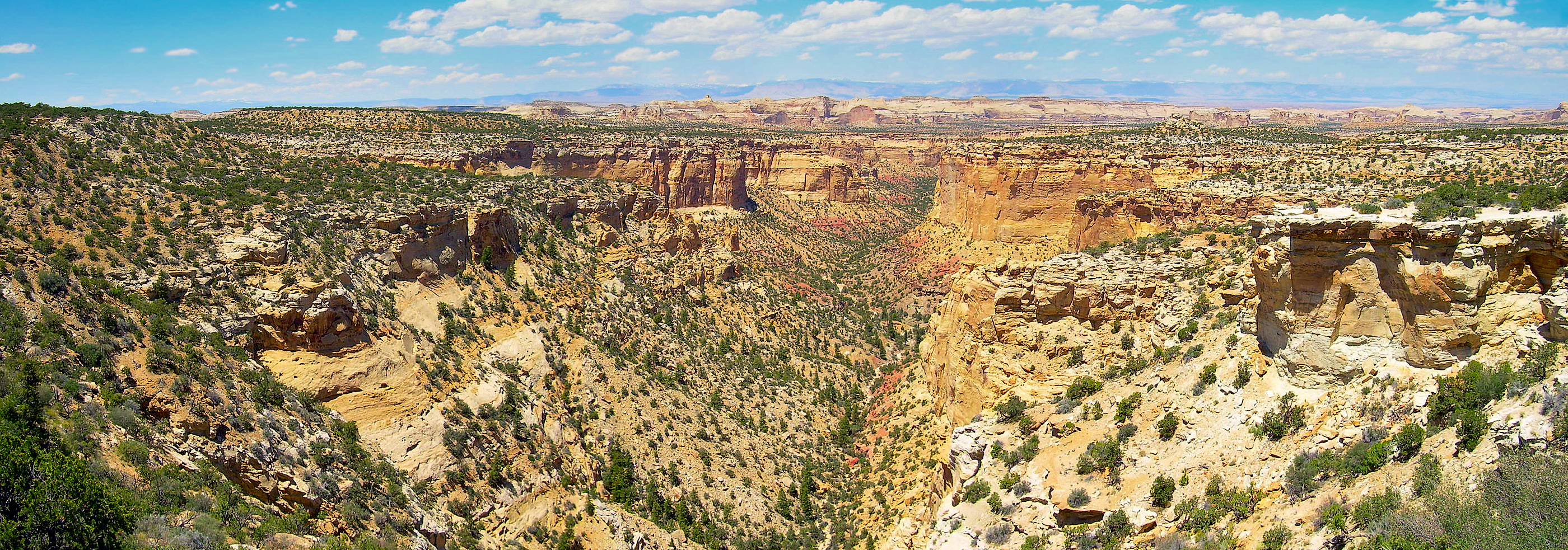
Eagle Canyon as seen from I-70

As first proposed in 1956, the western terminus of I-70 was Denver, Colorado. Officials from Colorado pressured the federal government to extend the plans for I-70 further west. After several discussions with Utah officials, Utah supported an extension that would follow US-6/US-50 (now US-6), to connect with I-15 at Spanish Fork. This proposal would connect the Salt Lake City area with Denver. While accepting the Colorado/Utah proposal, federal planners also decided to show a modified proposal, with the terminus of I-70 at Cove Fort, to planners at the Department of the Army. The planners opposed the extension to Salt Lake but felt the modified proposal would benefit the US Army by providing a better connection to southern California. The new route would shorten the distance between Los Angeles and Denver by about 200 miles (320 km). The route to Cove Fort was approved on October 18, 1957. A general announcement was made, with no prior notice given to Utah officials of the modification. The commissioner of the Bureau of Public Roads later admitted that the lack of notice was intentional, fearing infighting if the bureau did not announce a final decision.

A state historian stated the news hit Utah "like a bombshell". Except for the officials in Utah that represented the area, most opposed a freeway that would serve no populated areas in the state. The route was mocked as a public relations blunder and a "road to nowhere". Utah officials attempted to revert plans to their preferred alternative but later resigned to construct I-70 on the federally selected route. Governor George Dewey Clyde concluded, "Utah had no choice but to accept the Cove Fort routing, or have none at all." Even attempts to route the freeway slightly north, to serve more cities in Emery County, were blocked. Federal planners insisted the freeway pass Green River on a southwest course and not turn north. Even today, there is no direct Interstate link between Salt Lake City and Denver. Motorists must choose between the two lane routes (US-6 or US-40) or detour on I-80 through Wyoming.

=== Construction ===
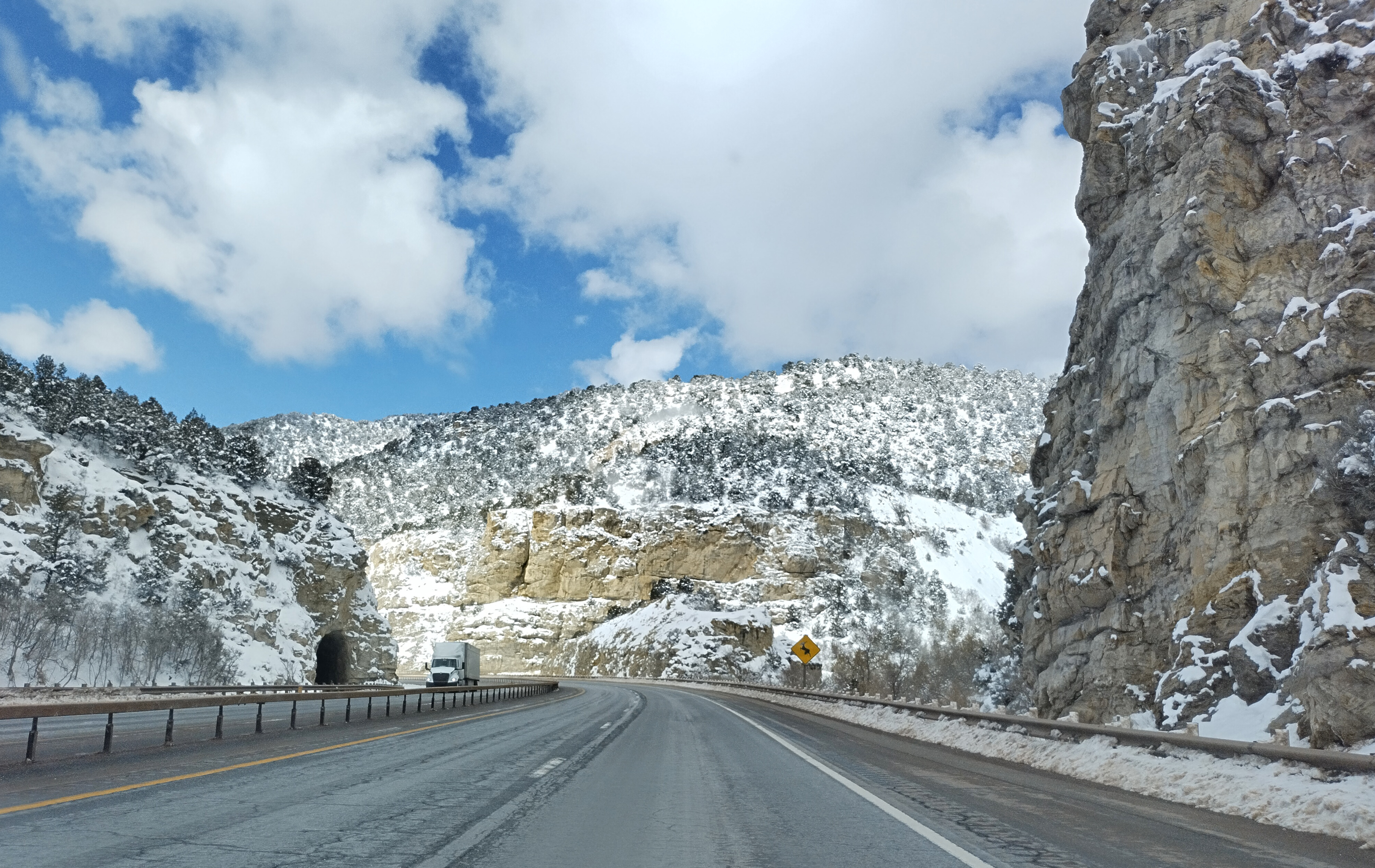
Westbound I-70 inside Salina Canyon after a snowstorm. The tunnel is one of the few remnants of the railroad which was used for the route of the freeway through the canyon.

With the plans for I-70 extended, a transcontinental route would again be attempted across the San Rafael Swell. The area west of Green River was so remote that survey crews followed wild horses with jeeps to survey parts of the route. According to a story told at the highway's dedication by an engineer who surveyed the highway, his group was approached by a sheep rancher and asked what they were doing. The rancher fell over laughing when he was told they were building a freeway.

The survey crew did not use the route of the railroad past the San Rafael Reef. However, they did use the route of the railroad across the Wasatch Plateau. The construction crews destroyed two of four tunnels when the bed was widened for the freeway. The two remaining tunnels are visible just south of the freeway and are used by a frontage road.

Some noncontiguous portions of I-70 over the Pavant Range and Wasatch Plateau were temporarily signed as SR-4. The portion over the San Rafael Swell opened to traffic in 1970, finally making the Utah portion of I-70 a drivable route.

I-70 was dedicated on December 5, 1970, at the Ghost Rocks view area inside the swell, even though it would take another 20 years to fully complete the freeway. At the ceremony, the mayors of cities recently made neighbors, including Grand Junction, Colorado, introduced themselves. Then-Governor Cal Rampton noted that I-70 was the longest road the US had built over a completely new route since the Alaska Highway, during World War II. It was also noted this was the longest piece of the Interstate Highway System to open at a given time.

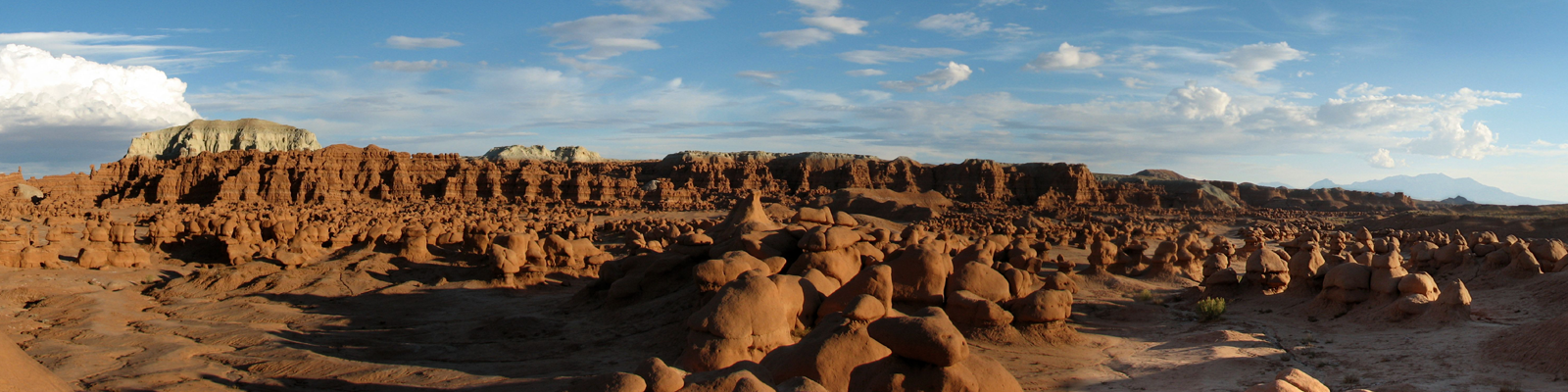
Goblin Valley State Park just south of I-70

Initially only two lanes, now the eastbound lanes, through the swell were constructed. The official highway map for Utah noted the new freeway but qualified its existence with the words "two lanes open".

The Utah portion of I-70 was not completed to Interstate Highway standards until October 1990, when the second Eagle Canyon bridge was dedicated. The new bridge carried westbound traffic while the 1970 bridge switched to eastbound only traffic. A second dedication ceremony was held at new bridge to declare the Utah portion of I-70 complete. Archie Hamilton, one of three engineers who worked for UDOT long enough to see I-70 progress from conception to completion, said the most memorable moment was seeing the excavation at Spotted Wolf Canyon. He said before construction began, he could stand in one spot and touch both sides of the canyon. To carve the first eight miles (13 km) through the canyon required excavating 3,500,000 cubic yards (2,700,000 m^{3}) of rock. In 1990, it was estimated construction cost for the San Rafael Swell portion was $388 million (equivalent to $821 million in 2024); $105.5 million in 1970 (equivalent to $656 million in 2024) to build the first two lanes and $78 million in 1990 (equivalent to $165 million in 2024) to construct the rest. At the 1970 dedication, it was noted the cost of land acquisition helped to offset the cost of the massive excavation. UDOT acquired the right of way to build the majority of I-70 from the BLM at the lowest cost per mile of any highway in Utah.

=== Effect on rural Utah ===
In 2002, the Salt Lake Tribune interviewed the mayor of Richfield about the change I-70 brought to the Sevier Valley. Previously, these were isolated farming communities, whose residents felt they were unaccustomed to the crime and other effects that a transcontinental highway can bring. Residents of Richfield soon started to call I-70 "Cocaine Lane". The mayor stated that I-70 is a mixed blessing. He stated the highway is a boon to the hospitality industry and has made Richfield more accessible to other cities. However, the new road brought types of crime previously unknown to the city. The mayor lamented that after the completion of I-70, many residents started locking their doors for the first time. The interview resulted from an event that served as a "wake-up call", that rural Utah is "not isolated from crime". Panic ensued after the public witnessed Utah Highway Patrol troopers carrying away a suspect in handcuffs while removing plastic bags and coolers full of body parts from the trunk of his car. The event caused a frenzy of people checking on their neighbors, fearing the murder victims were local residents. In 2007, there were 11 violent crimes in Sevier County, a county of 19,386 residents.

Green River is the largest and only incorporated city directly served by I-70 in eastern Utah. Unlike the communities of the Sevier Valley, Green River was founded as a stopover for travelers along transcontinental arteries. The area was first used as a stopover for travelers navigating the Green River. Later, the town was formed to serve travelers along the Old Spanish Trail and stagecoach mail routes. Green River was an established stopover by the time the railroad and later highways were built through the area.

=== Effect on the San Rafael Swell ===
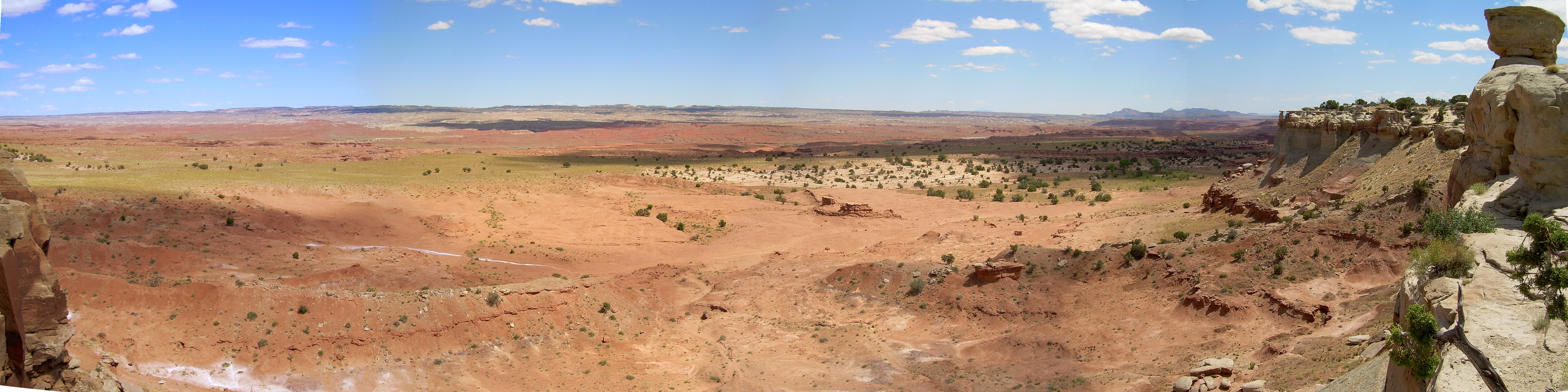
Desert overlook from I-70

Before the construction of I-70, the San Rafael Swell was relatively inaccessible and not well known or explored. There were, however, a few efforts to protect the swell as early as 1935. Since the construction of the freeway, the number of visitors to the swell has increased significantly, as the swell can now be accessed by automobile. As such, several groups are increasing efforts for protected status of the area, via national park, national monument, or wilderness designation.

A major push occurred in 2002 when officials from Emery County, joined by Utah governor Mike Leavitt, petitioned President George W. Bush to use the authority of the Antiquities Act and create a San Rafael Swell National Monument. This effort lost momentum after the governor promised to honor the wishes of Emery County residents via a nonbinding referendum, which did not pass. Common reasons given by residents for opposing the designation included fear of the federal government restricting access and a repetition of events that occurred with the Grand Staircase–Escalante National Monument. This monument was established in 1996 by President Bill Clinton. In that case, the monument was proposed at the federal level in secret. Boundaries were drawn without the consent or even knowledge of local residents. This incited anger and triggered a backlash in rural Utah.

Most of the swell is administered by the BLM and is not given special consideration. A small portion on the eastern edge is protected as Goblin Valley State Park, administered by the Utah Division of Parks and Recreation. In 2019, after lobbying by the Southern Utah Wilderness Alliance, congress directed the BLM to study 17 specific areas of Southern Utah for designation as a wilderness areas, including several in the San Rafael Swell. In the same act, Congress directed the BLM to create a San Rafael Swell Recreational Area.

=== Route number changes ===
Before the formation of I-70, there was a road over the Pavant Range numbered SR-13 that was similar to the route of I-70. The highway, which largely still exists as a two-lane road between SR-161 (former US-91) at Cove Fort and US-89 at Sevier, had been taken over by the state on August 2, 1912, and assigned the label by the early 1920s as part of Utah's initial highway numbering. In the Wasatch Plateau, the base for I-70 was derived from a portion of SR-10. Both of these were transferred to SR-4, which was the state legislative designation for all of I-70 in Utah, in 1962. US-50 was changed to overlap with I-70 through most of Utah in 1976, with US-6 remaining on its former route. In 1977, Utah renumbered its state routes so that the legislative and signed numbers would match. With this change, the state designation for I-70 is now SR-70.

== Exit list ==
County	Location	mi	km	Exit	Destinations	Notes
Millard		0.000	0.000	—	I-15 – Las Vegas, Salt Lake City	Western terminus; I-15 exit 132; trumpet interchange
Millard		1.346	2.166	1	Historic Cove Fort (SR-161)	
Sevier		7.835	12.609	7	Clear Creek Canyon Road	
Sevier		17.159	27.615	17	Fremont Indian State Park	
Sevier		23.188	37.317	23	US 89 south – Panguitch, Kanab	West end of US-89 overlap
Sevier	Joseph	25.763	41.462	25	SR-118 north – Joseph, Monroe	
Sevier	Elsinore	31.676	50.978	31	Elsinore, Monroe (SR-258)	Monroe is not listed as a control city on the eastbound exit signs.
Sevier	Richfield	37.124	59.745	37	I-70 BL east / SR-120 – Richfield	
Sevier	Richfield	40.258	64.789	40	I-70 BL west / SR-120 – Richfield	
Sevier		48.920	78.729	48	To SR-24 (SR-259) – Sigurd, Aurora	
Sevier	Salina	56.705	91.258	56	I-70 BS / US 89 north / US 50 west – Salina	East end of US-89 overlap; west end of US-50 overlap
Sevier		63.193	101.699	63	Gooseberry Road	
Sevier		73.924	118.969	73	Salina Creek	Formerly signed as "Ranch Exit"
Sevier		86.773	139.648	86	Ivie Creek rest area	Access via SR-76
Sevier		91.011	146.468	91	SR-10 north / SR-72 south – Price, Loa	
Emery		99.488	160.110	99	Millers Canyon	Formerly signed as "Ranch Exit"
Emery		104.620	168.370	Salt Wash view area		
Emery		108.011	173.827	108	Lone Tree	Formerly signed as "Ranch Exit"
Emery		115.634	186.095	Devil's Canyon view area (eastbound)		
Emery		116.513	187.509	116	Moore	Eagle Canyon view area also signed westbound
Emery		122.566	197.251	Ghost Rocks view area		
Emery		131.507	211.640	131	Temple Mountain Road	Formerly signed as "Ranch Exit"
Emery		142.585	229.468	Spotted Wolf Canyon view area		
Emery		146.337	235.507	San Rafael Reef view area (westbound)		
Emery		149.198	240.111	149	SR-24 west – Hanksville	
Emery		157.924	254.154	157	US 6 west / US 191 north – Price, Salt Lake City	West end of US-6/191 overlap
Emery		160.403	258.144	160	I-70 BL / SR-19 east – Green River	I-70 Bus. not signed westbound
Grand		164.547	264.813	164	I-70 BL / SR-19 west – Green River	I-70 Bus. not signed eastbound
Grand		175.585	282.577	175	Floy	
Grand	Crescent Junction	182.153	293.147	182	US 191 south – Crescent Junction, Moab	East end of US-191 overlap; former US-160 east
Grand		187.413	301.612	187	SR-94 – Thompson Springs	
Grand		189.876	305.576	Rest area / Visitors Center (westbound)		
Grand		193.469	311.358	193	Yellowcat	
Grand		204.738	329.494	204	SR-128 south – Cisco	
Grand		214.367	344.990	214	Danish Flat	
Grand		221.885	357.089	221	Sulphur	
Grand		227.086	365.459	227	Westwater	
Grand		228.352	367.497	Harley Dome view area (westbound)		
Grand		231.673	372.842		I-70 east / US 6 east / US 50 east – Grand Junction, Denver	Continuation into Colorado
1.000 mi = 1.609 km; 1.000 km = 0.621 mi: Concurrency terminus; Incomplete access

== See also ==
- Muddy Creek

Interstate 70
Previous state: Terminus	Utah	Next state: Colorado
