= Ruin Arch =

Archaeological site in Utah, U.S.

Coordinates: 39.1629°N 110.7343°W

Ruin Arch is a little-visited archaeological site in the San Rafael Swell of south-central Utah, which features some ancient Fremont culture artwork. To the left of the arch is an Indian Kiva. The arch is one of the features of the Ruin Arch area; across from the arch is more rock art and kivas.
