= Factory Butte (Wayne County, Utah) =

Butte in Wayne County, Utah, United States

Coordinates: 38°26′13″N 110°54′49″W

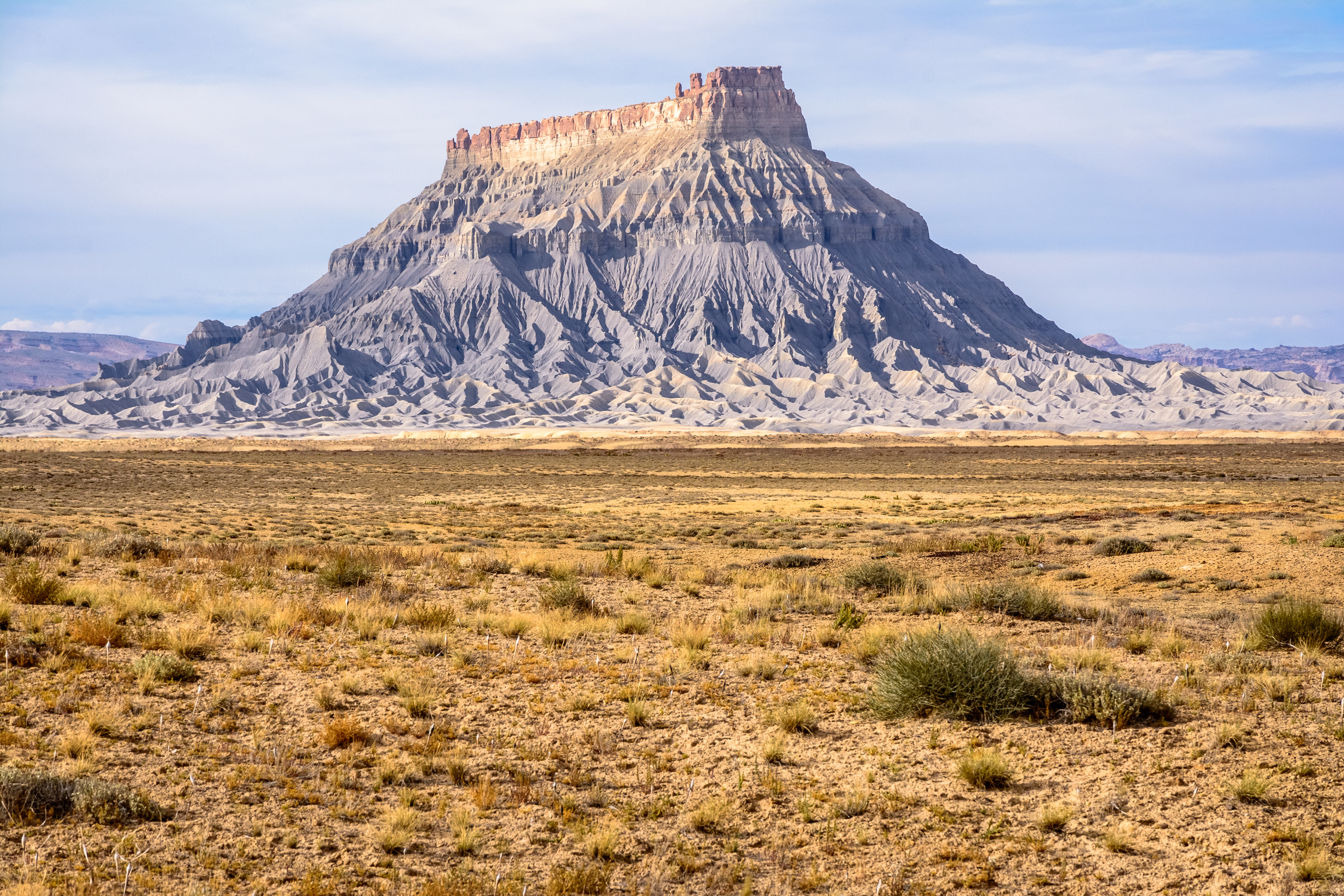
Factory Butte

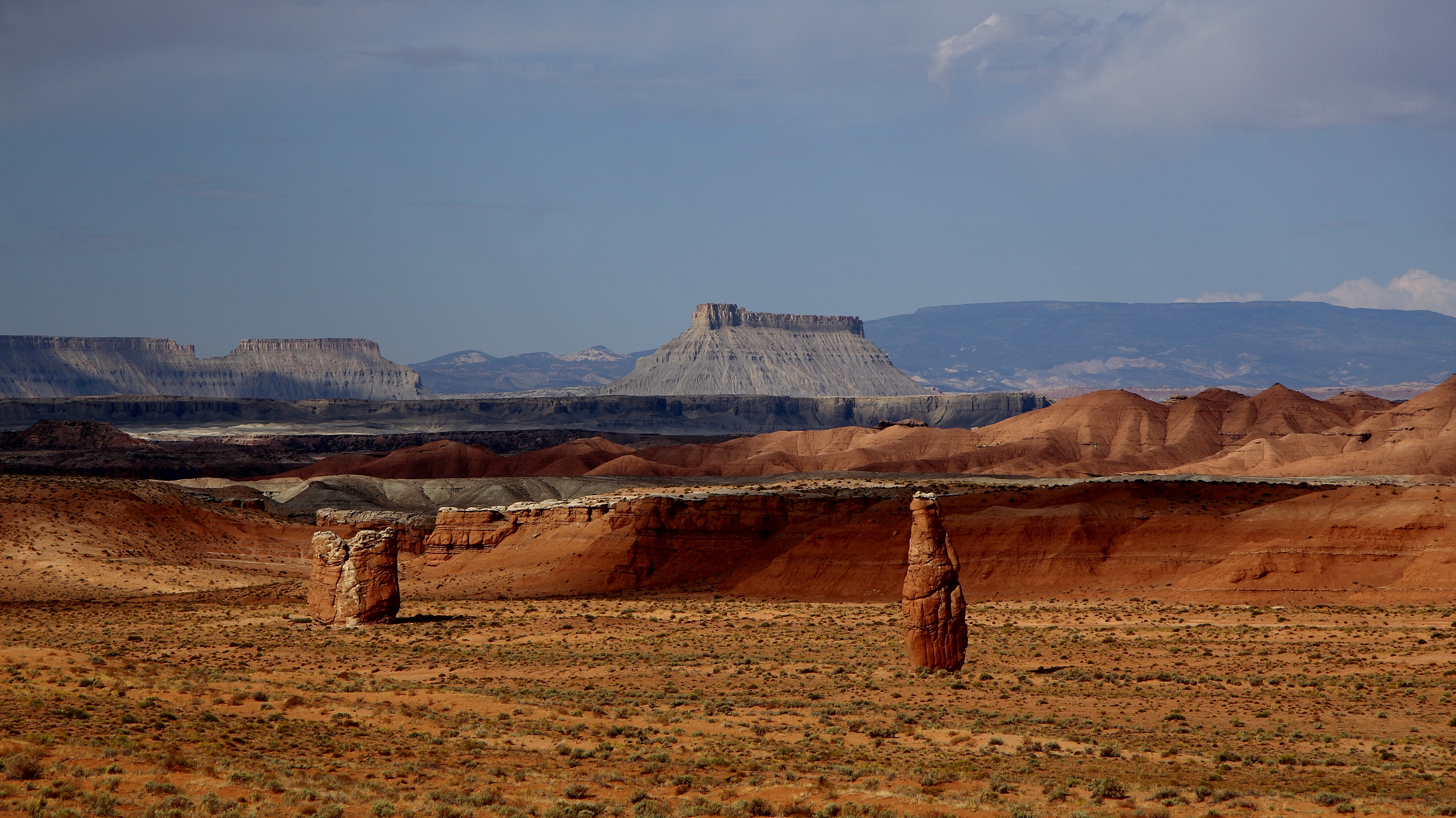
Landscape, with Factory Butte in the distance, September 2008

Factory Butte in Wayne County, Utah, is a 6,302-foot (1,921 m) summit in the Upper Blue Hills in northern Wayne County, Utah, United States, about 12 miles (19 km) northwest of Hanksville and about 14 miles (23 km) east of Capitol Reef National Park boundary.

The butte was so named by early settlers who thought its outline resembled a huge factory building, the Provo woolen mill in particular.

== Description ==
The Walla Walla Union-Bulletin described it as a "Monolith that towers over the San Rafael Desert and harbors pockets of protected cacti". The Bureau of Land Management controls the area, and they describe it by saying it is a popular recreation site for motor vehicles. It is also a place to view wildflowers, and tourists also stop at Factory Butte to photograph blooming cacti and desert flowers. Factory Butte in Emery County, Utah, lies 15 miles (24 km) to the west-northwest.

== See also ==
- List of mountains in Utah
