= Muddy Creek (central Utah) =

Stream in central Utah, U.S.

Coordinates: 38°24′10″N 110°41′35″W

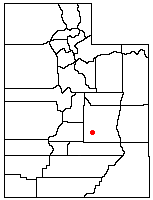
Location of Muddy Creek, Utah

Muddy Creek is a stream in central Utah, United States, that drains portions of Emery, Sanpete, Sevier, and Wayne counties.

== Description ==
The creek begins on the eastern slopes of the Wasatch Plateau at elevations above 10,500 feet (3,200 m). It turns southward near the town of Emery, then southeastward, where it crosses under Interstate 70. It then enters the western flank of the San Rafael Swell and, continuing southeast, it passes Hondu Arch and the Tomsich Butte mining area before beginning its spectacular passage through a narrow slot canyon of Coconino Sandstone known as “the Chute".

After merging with Chimney Canyon and passing the Hidden Splendor Mine area, it passes through the southeastern escarpment of the San Rafael Reef at the end of Muddy Creek Gorge. In its lower reaches, it continues southeastward through the Blue Hills badlands near Caineville, then cuts through the Jurassic Morrison Formation where dinosaur fossils have been found. Finally, after an estimated length of 100 miles (160 km) and a drop of 6,000 feet (1,800 m), it meets the Fremont River some miles north of the town of Hanksville where the two form the Dirty Devil River (which then flows south to meet the Colorado River).

Since it enters the San Rafael Swell at an elevation well below that attained by the Swell itself and continues through the Swell's entire expanse, Muddy Creek is a very ancient river course, "superimposed" on the entire San Rafael uplift and therefore predating the time when the latter arose some 60-40 million years ago.

== Wilderness ==
Designated in 2019 by the U.S. Congress, the Muddy Creek Wilderness encompasses the pristine portion of the creek that enters the San Rafael Swell. The 98,023 acres wilderness area is managed by the U.S. Bureau of Land Management.

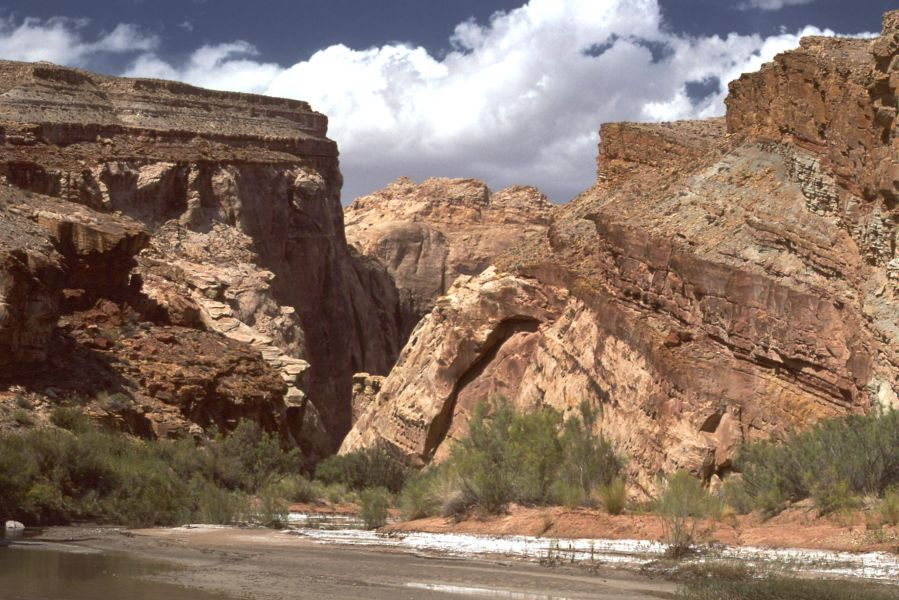
Muddy Creek Gorge, looking northwest toward its mouth at the southeastern edge of the Swell

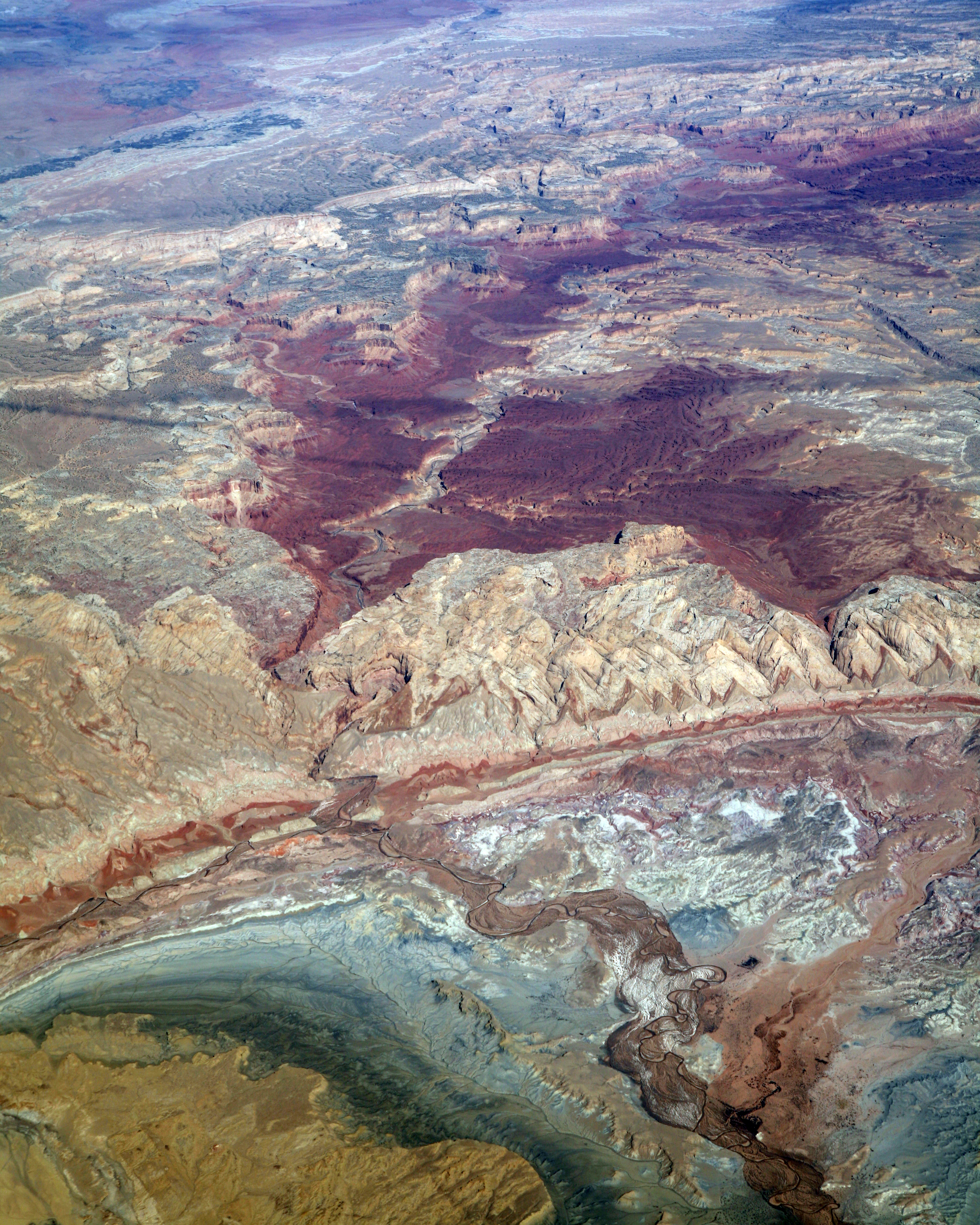
Aerial view of Muddy Creek cutting through the San Rafael Reef and Swell

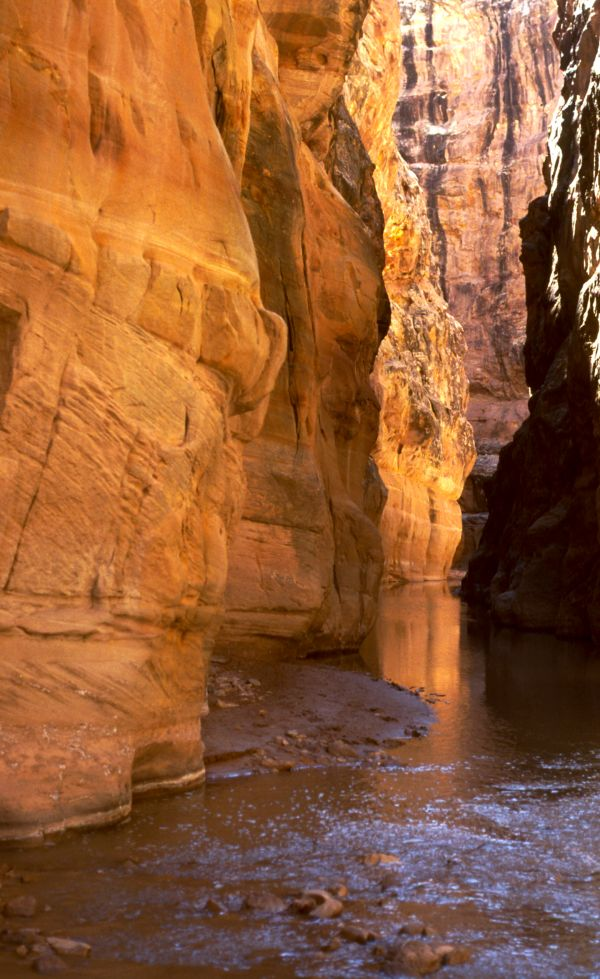
The Chute of Muddy Creek

== See also ==
- List of Utah rivers
- List of tributaries of the Colorado River
- Quitchupah Creek
- List of U.S. Wilderness Areas
