= San Rafael Reef =

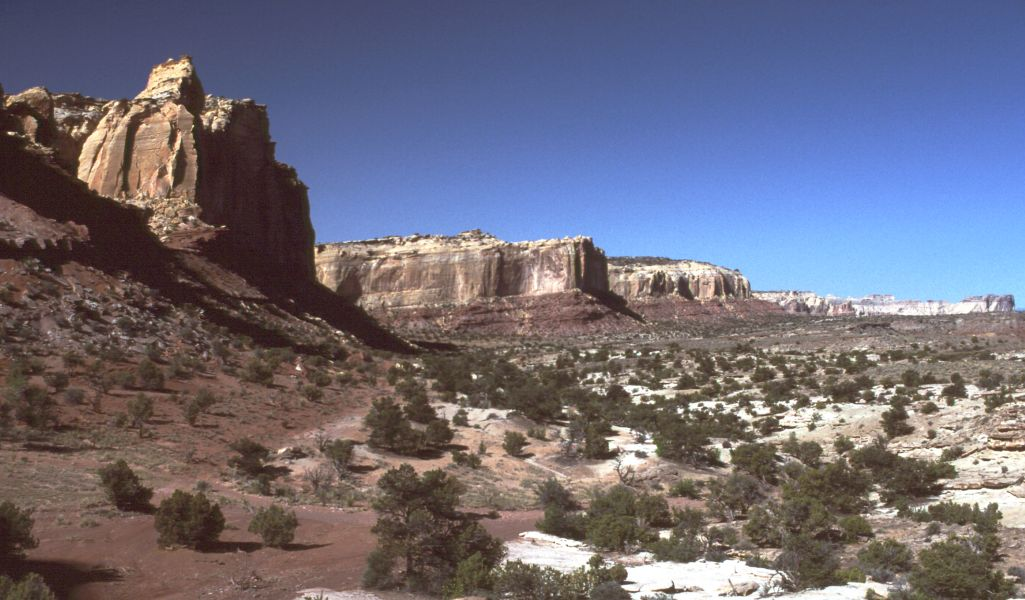
- Western San Rafael Reef, Utah, looking south

Highest point
- Coordinates: 38°55′19″N 110°26′17″W

Geography
- Location within Utah
- Location: Emery County, Utah

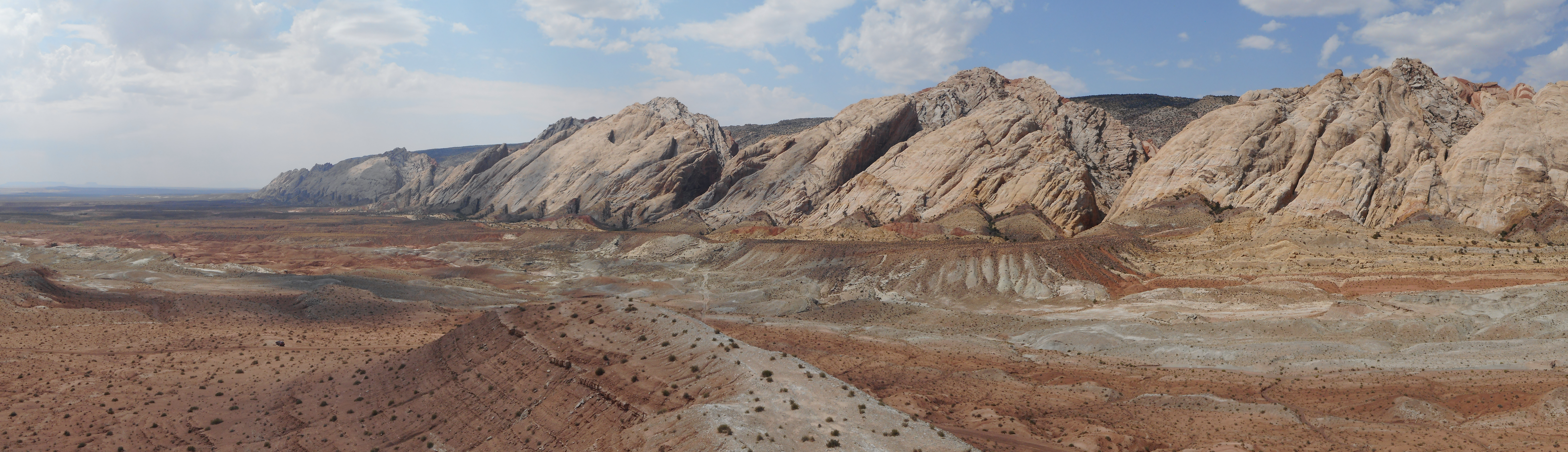
Upturned strata forming the San Rafael Reef south of Interstate 70, Emery County, Utah.

The San Rafael Reef is a geologic feature located in Emery County in central Utah, part of the Colorado Plateau. Approximately 75 miles (120 km) long, it is the distinctive eastern edge of the San Rafael Swell. Composed primarily of steeply tilted layers of Navajo and Wingate Sandstone, it has been eroded into tall fins, domes, cliffs, and deep canyons.

The San Rafael River, Interstate 70, and Muddy Creek all cut through the San Rafael Reef. There are numerous slot canyons that twist their way through the flanks of the San Rafael Reef, among them Crack Canyon, Chute Canyon and Straight Wash. These canyons are often just a few feet wide and can be hundreds of feet deep.

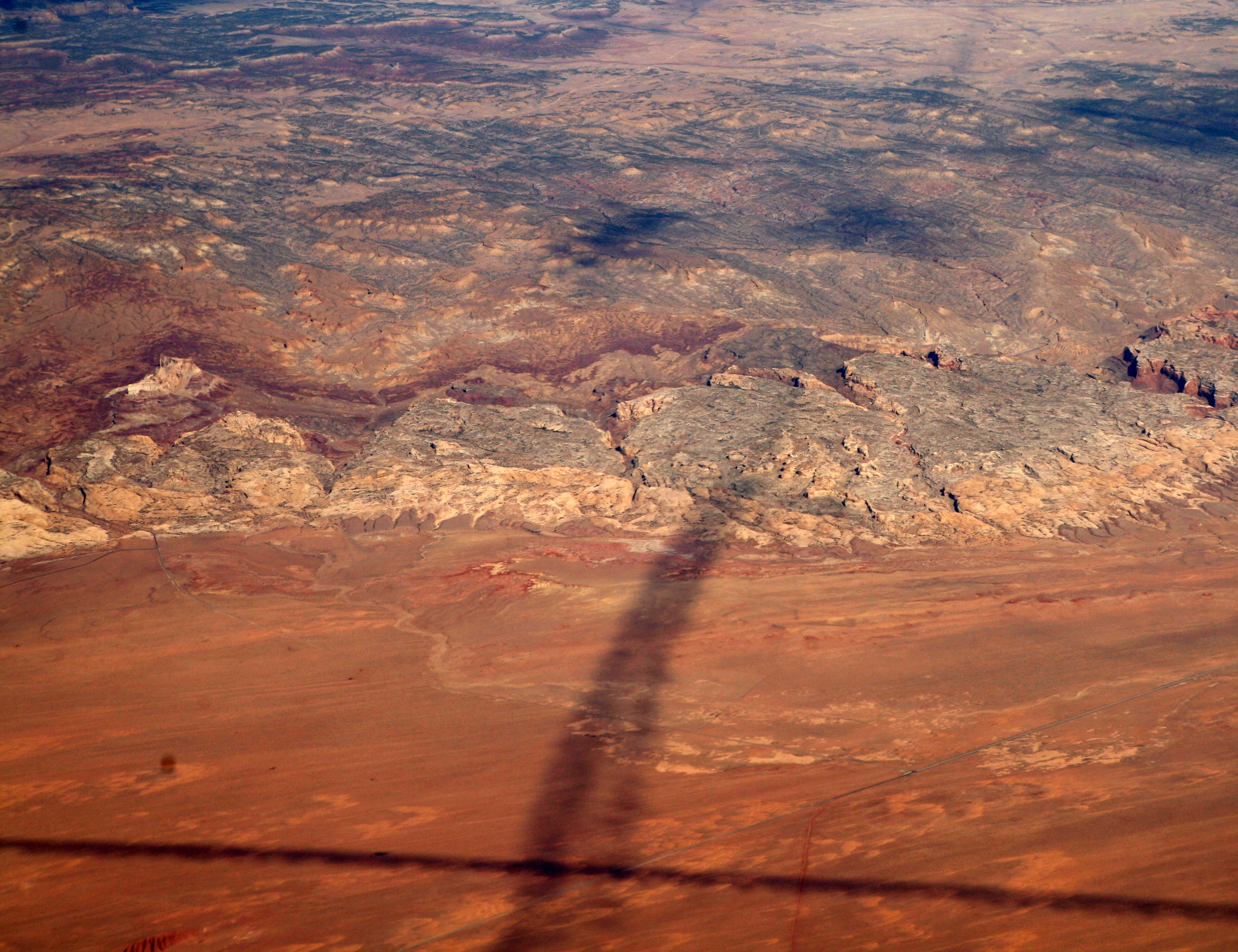
Shadows of contrails over San Rafael Reef —
San Rafael Swell, Reef (perimeter), and San Rafael Desert at south & southeast. The Reef is most of the southeast, and east perimeter of the 45-mile-wide (72 km) (west-to-east) San Rafael Swell, which trends southwest-by-northeast.

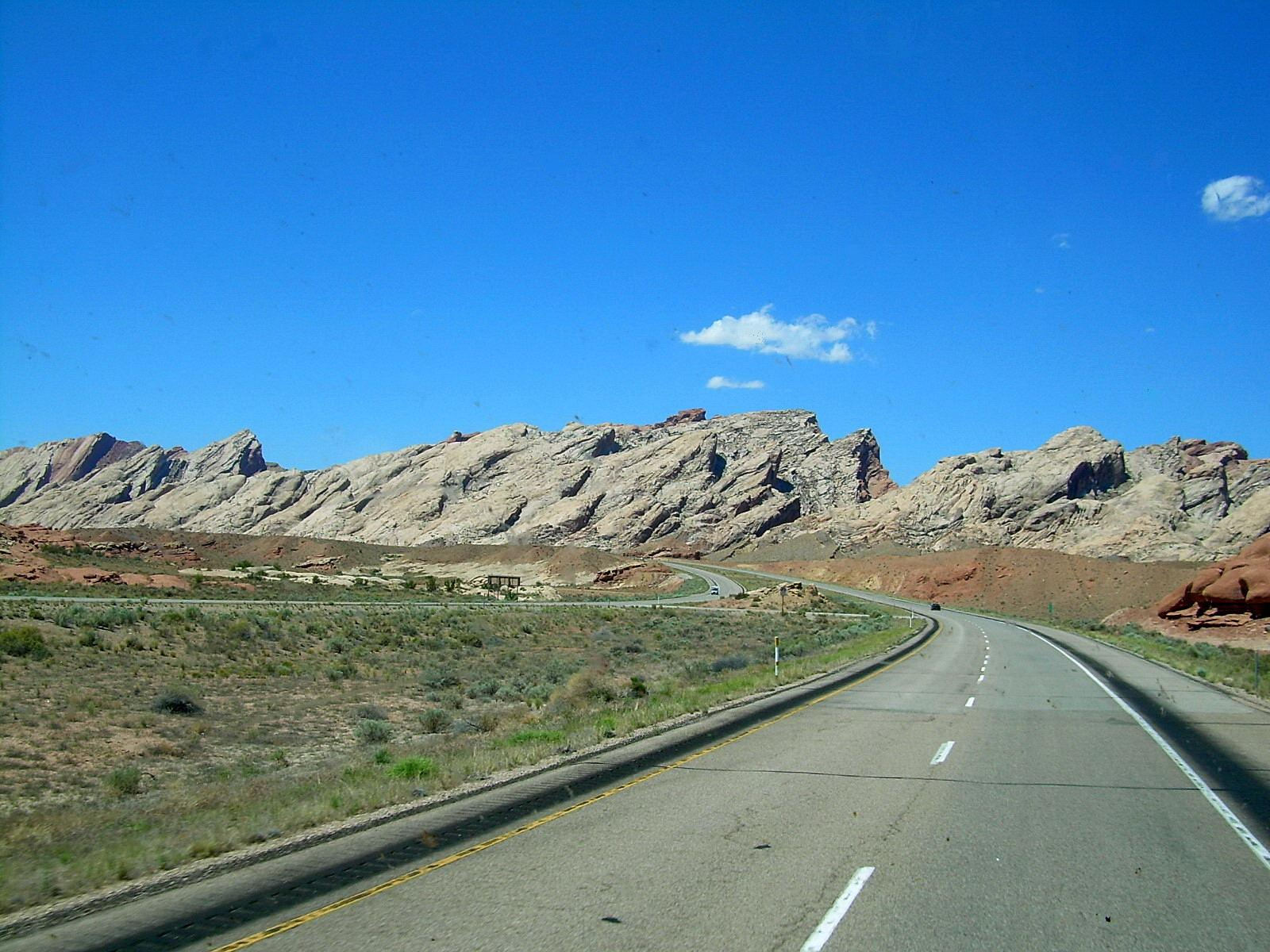
Approach to the San Rafael Reef's eastern end, from Interstate 70, which crosses through the Reef onto the San Rafael Swell, east-to-west looking.

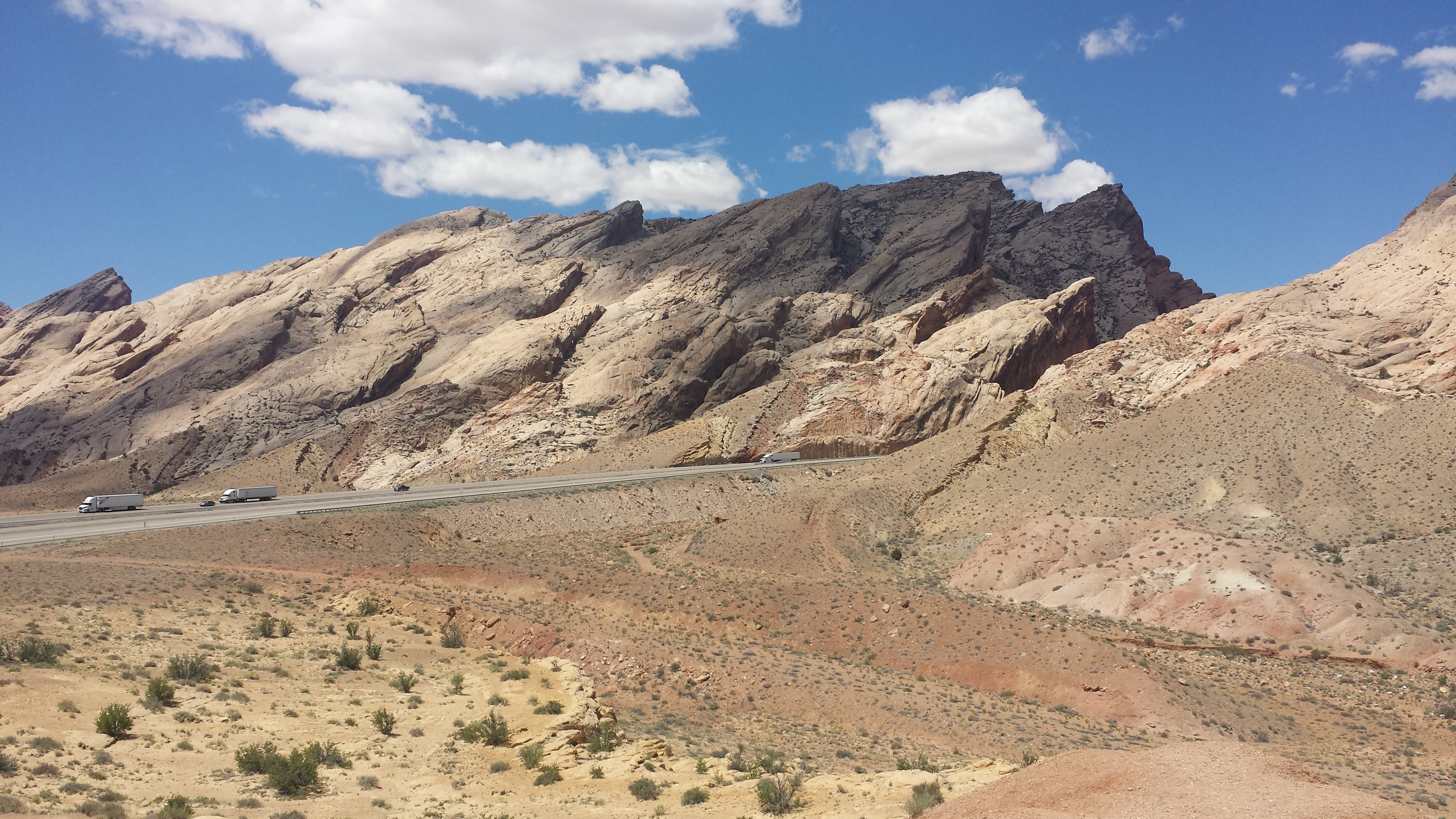
Interstate 70 cuts through the impressive San Rafael Reef from the east.

== Wilderness ==
The eastern edge of the San Rafael Swell Recreation area is protected as the San Rafael Reef Wilderness, designated in 2019 by the U.S. Congress. The 60,442 acre wilderness area is managed by the U.S. Bureau of Land Management.
