= Crow Seep =

Coordinates: 38.2938766°N 110.3562469°W

Crow Seep is a spring in Wayne County, Utah, United States.

Crow Seep was named after Crow, a wild horse captured at the spring and tamed by a local rancher.

== See also ==
- List of rivers of Utah
