= Hanksville, Utah =

Town in the state of Utah, United States

- Town
- Aerial view of Hanksville in 2022.

- Location in Wayne County and the state of Utah.
- Coordinates: 38°22′17″N 110°42′47″W
- Country: United States
- State: Utah
- County: Wayne
- Settled: 1882
- Incorporated: January 6, 1999
- Named for: Ebenezer Hanks

Area
  - Total: 1.72 sq mi (4.45 km^{2})
  - Land: 1.68 sq mi (4.36 km^{2})
  - Water: 0.035 sq mi (0.09 km^{2})
- Elevation: 4,295 ft (1,309 m)

Population (2020)
  - Total: 158
  - Density: 130.6/sq mi (50.42/km^{2})
- Time zone: UTC-7 (Mountain (MST))
  - Summer (DST): UTC-6 (MDT)
- ZIP codes: 84734
- Area code: 435
- FIPS code: 49-33100
- GNIS feature ID: 2412723
- Website: www.hanksvilleutah.gov

Hanksville is a small town in Wayne County, Utah, United States, at the junction of State Routes 24 and 95. The population was 158 at the 2020 census.

Situated in the Colorado Plateau's cold desert ecological region, the town is just south of the confluence of the Fremont River and Muddy Creek, which together form the Dirty Devil River, which then flows southeast to the Colorado River. The Hanksville-Burpee Quarry is located nearby, and the Mars Desert Research Station is 7 miles (11 km) northwest of town. The Bureau of Land Management's Henry Mountains field station is located in Hanksville.

== History ==
The town was settled in 1882 and known for a time for the name given to the surrounding area, Graves Valley. It took the name of Hanksville in 1885, after Ebenezer Hanks, an early settler. It was incorporated in 1999.

The Rural Electrification Administration brought electricity to the community in 1960. Today agriculture, mining, and tourism are the main drivers to the local economy. Tourism is particularly important with people coming for recreation at Lake Powell, Capitol Reef National Park, the Henry Mountains, the San Rafael Swell, Goblin Valley State Park, Factory Butte, and the solitude of the surrounding deserts and slot canyons.

Hanksville was a supply post for Butch Cassidy and the Wild Bunch, who would hide out at Robbers Roost in the desert southeast of town.

During the uranium mining frenzy following World War II, Hanksville became a supply center for the prospectors and miners scouring the deserts of the Colorado Plateau. Many abandoned mines can be found in the deserts surrounding the town.

== Demographics ==
Historical population
Census	Pop.	Note	%±
1890	81		—
1900	46		−43.2%
1910	77		67.4%
1920	141		83.1%
1930	81		−42.6%
1940	129		59.3%
1950	129		0.0%
1960	169		31.0%
1970	181		7.1%
1980	351		93.9%
1990	324		−7.7%
2000	362		11.7%
2010	219		−39.5%
2020	158		−27.9%
U.S. Decennial Census

As of the 2010 census, 219 people lived in the town. There were 94 housing units. The racial makeup of the town was 98.2% White, 0.5% Asian, and 1.4% from two or more races. Hispanic or Latino of any race were 0.9% of the population.

== Climate ==
According to the Köppen climate classification system, Hanksville has an arid climate, abbreviated "BWk" (cold desert) on climate maps. It has a mean annual temperature of 53.9 °F (12.2 °C) and an annual mean rainfall of 6.16 inches (156.5 mm).

Climate data for Hanksville, Utah, 1991–2020 normals, extremes 1910–2022
Month	Jan	Feb	Mar	Apr	May	Jun	Jul	Aug	Sep	Oct	Nov	Dec	Year
Record high °F (°C)	69 (21)	75 (24)	88 (31)	98 (37)	107 (42)	110 (43)	114 (46)	110 (43)	105 (41)	97 (36)	82 (28)	70 (21)	114 (46)
Mean maximum °F (°C)	57.4 (14.1)	65.3 (18.5)	78.8 (26.0)	87.5 (30.8)	96.9 (36.1)	104.4 (40.2)	108.0 (42.2)	104.3 (40.2)	98.5 (36.9)	88.2 (31.2)	70.4 (21.3)	57.4 (14.1)	108.4 (42.4)
Mean daily maximum °F (°C)	43.1 (6.2)	51.2 (10.7)	63.8 (17.7)	70.8 (21.6)	81.1 (27.3)	93.4 (34.1)	98.7 (37.1)	95.2 (35.1)	86.3 (30.2)	71.5 (21.9)	55.7 (13.2)	42.9 (6.1)	71.1 (21.8)
Daily mean °F (°C)	29.1 (−1.6)	36.2 (2.3)	46.4 (8.0)	53.1 (11.7)	62.8 (17.1)	73.1 (22.8)	79.8 (26.6)	76.8 (24.9)	67.1 (19.5)	53.3 (11.8)	39.7 (4.3)	29.0 (−1.7)	53.9 (12.1)
Mean daily minimum °F (°C)	15.2 (−9.3)	21.1 (−6.1)	28.9 (−1.7)	35.3 (1.8)	44.4 (6.9)	52.7 (11.5)	60.9 (16.1)	58.3 (14.6)	47.9 (8.8)	35.1 (1.7)	23.6 (−4.7)	15.0 (−9.4)	36.5 (2.5)
Mean minimum °F (°C)	1.2 (−17.1)	6.8 (−14.0)	16.4 (−8.7)	23.6 (−4.7)	33.1 (0.6)	42.1 (5.6)	51.1 (10.6)	48.8 (9.3)	35.7 (2.1)	22.0 (−5.6)	10.7 (−11.8)	2.6 (−16.3)	−2.3 (−19.1)
Record low °F (°C)	−35 (−37)	−33 (−36)	4 (−16)	10 (−12)	23 (−5)	31 (−1)	38 (3)	35 (2)	24 (−4)	−6 (−21)	−8 (−22)	−24 (−31)	−35 (−37)
Average precipitation inches (mm)	0.40 (10)	0.39 (9.9)	0.47 (12)	0.45 (11)	0.43 (11)	0.23 (5.8)	0.71 (18)	0.57 (14)	0.83 (21)	0.87 (22)	0.47 (12)	0.34 (8.6)	6.16 (155.3)
Average snowfall inches (cm)	2.5 (6.4)	1.1 (2.8)	0.5 (1.3)	0.0 (0.0)	0.0 (0.0)	0.0 (0.0)	0.0 (0.0)	0.0 (0.0)	0.0 (0.0)	0.1 (0.25)	0.6 (1.5)	2.5 (6.4)	7.3 (18.65)
Average precipitation days (≥ 0.01 in)	4.2	4.4	4.0	3.7	3.7	2.3	4.5	5.3	4.7	4.1	2.8	3.6	47.3
Average snowy days (≥ 0.1 in)	1.4	0.6	0.3	0.0	0.0	0.0	0.0	0.0	0.0	0.1	0.5	1.6	4.5
Source 1: NOAA
Source 2: National Weather Service

== See also ==
- List of cities and towns in Utah
- Crow seep
