= Dirty Devil River =

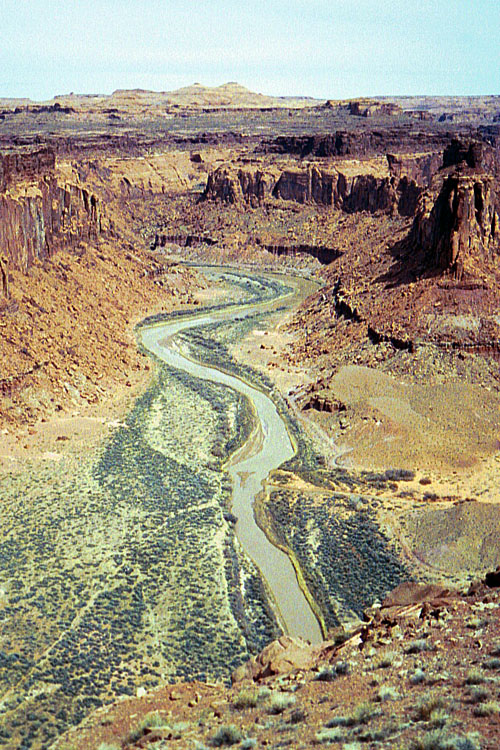
- The Dirty Devil River near Twin Corral Box Canyon

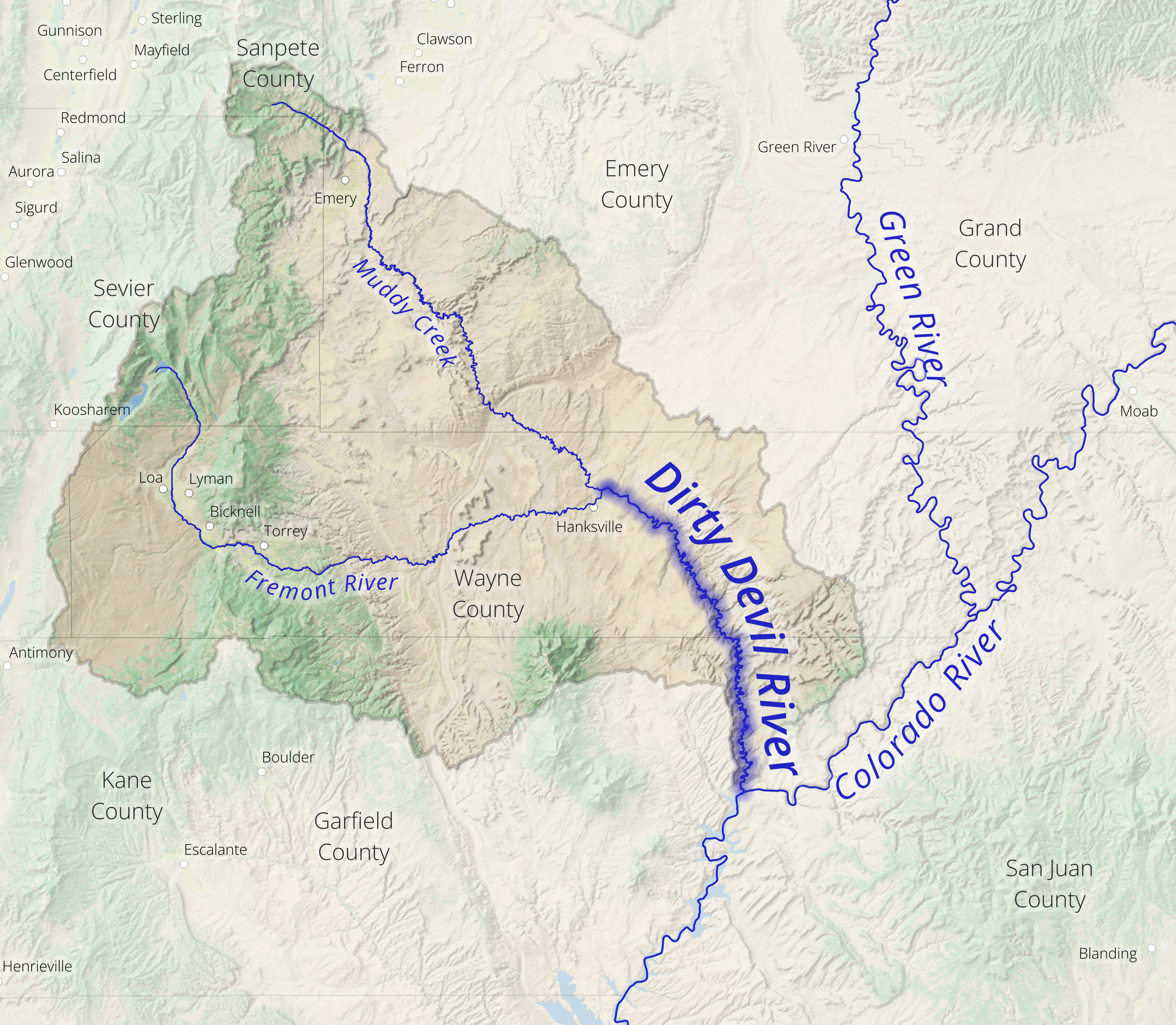
- Location of the Dirty Devil River within Utah

- Location of the mouth of the Dirty Devil River in Utah

Location
- Country: United States
- State: Utah
- County: Wayne County, Garfield County

Physical characteristics
- Source: Confluence of Fremont River and Muddy Creek
  - location: Wayne County, Utah
  - coordinates: 38°24′9″N 110°41′35″W
  - elevation: 4,266 ft (1,300 m)
- Mouth: Colorado River
  - location: Lake Powell, Glen Canyon National Recreation Area, Garfield County, Utah
  - coordinates: 37°53′30″N 110°23′33″W
  - elevation: 3,703 ft (1,129 m)
- Length: 80 mi (130 km)
- Discharge
  - average: 101 cu ft/s (2.9 m^{3}/s)
  - minimum: 0 cu ft/s (0 m^{3}/s)
  - maximum: 35,800 cu ft/s (1,010 m^{3}/s)

Basin features
- Tributaries
  - left: Muddy Creek
  - right: Fremont River

The Dirty Devil River is an 80-mile-long (130 km) tributary of the Colorado River, located in the U.S. state of Utah. It flows through southern Utah from the confluence of the Fremont River and Muddy Creek before emptying into the Colorado River at Lake Powell.

== Course ==
The Dirty Devil River is formed in Wayne County near Hanksville at the confluence of the Fremont River and Muddy Creek. It flows generally southward through a 2,000-foot-deep (610 m) canyon in Wayne and Garfield counties. Its lower 20 miles (32 km) flows through Glen Canyon National Recreation Area, where it finally disembogues into the Colorado River at a point that is now submerged beneath Lake Powell.

The canyon carved by the river is particularly isolated and seldom visited compared to other natural areas in the region. The average discharge is approximately 446 cubic feet per second.

== History ==
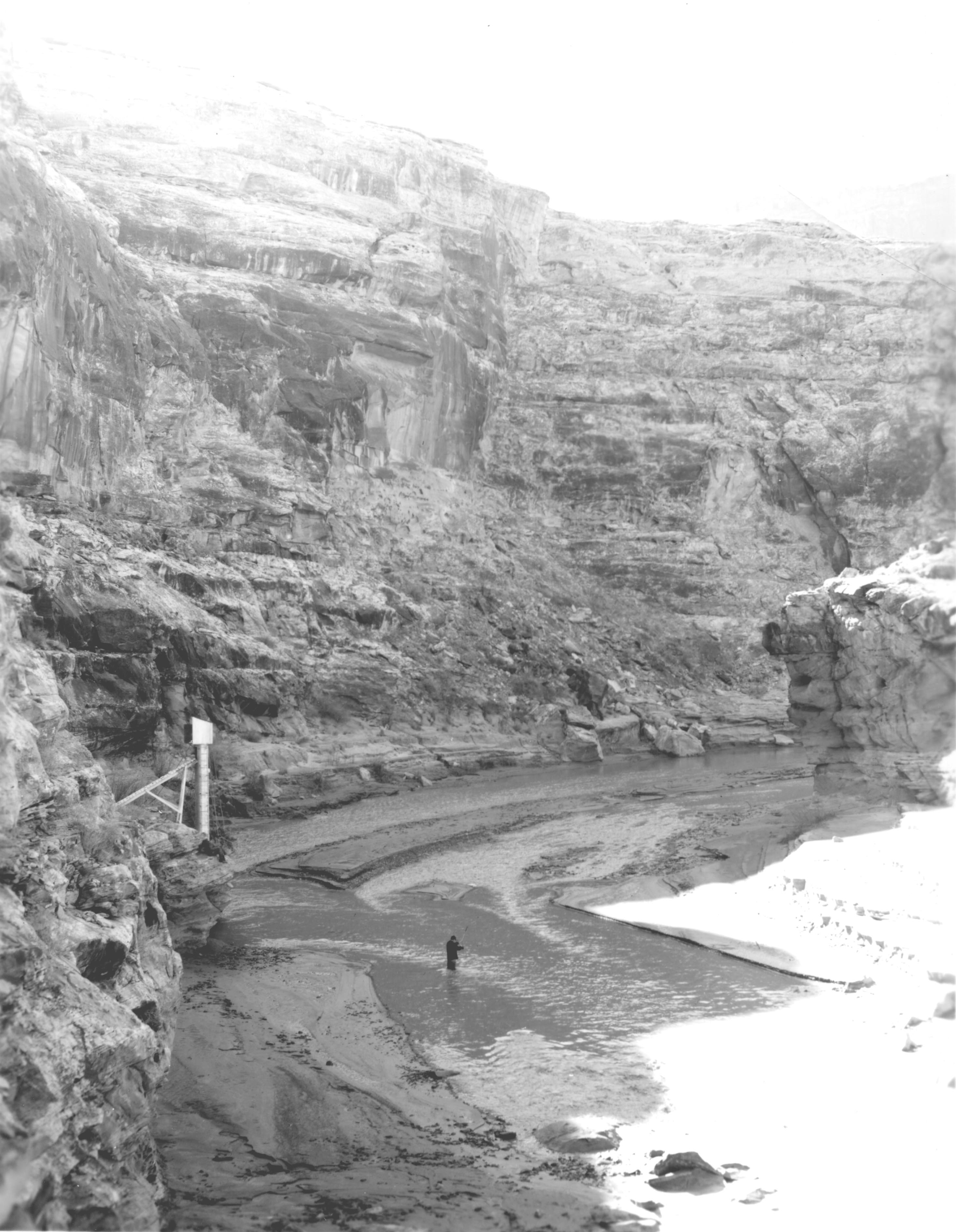
The Dirty Devil River on February 16, 1954, near crossover by Poison Springs Wash Road in Hanksville

The Dirty Devil River was named by the 1869 Powell Geographic Expedition led by John Wesley Powell, which explored much of the Colorado River and its tributaries. It was named for the extreme salinity and turbidity of the water near its mouth. Powell later contrasted it with a much cleaner stream in the Grand Canyon, which he named Bright Angel Creek.

The outlaw Butch Cassidy and his gang used tributary canyons of the Dirty Devil, such as Robbers Roost, as a hideout in the 1890s.

== Geology ==
The Dirty Devil River and its tributaries contribute approximately 150,000 tons of salt to the Colorado River each year, with the Muddy Creek tributary contributing an annual average of 86,000 tons by itself. The Fremont River tributary does not contribute significant amounts of salt. The United States Bureau of Reclamation drew up a plan to reduce the salinity of the Dirty Devil River by collecting salty spring water and using deep-well injection to dispose of it. The plan, finalized in 1987, has not been implemented due to its marginal cost effectiveness.

== Bridges ==
The river is spanned by a bridge a few miles northwest of the Hite Crossing Bridge, a steel arch bridge over the Colorado River on State Route 95 near milepost 45 in Garfield County. It is also spanned by a bridge on State Route 24 a few miles NE of Hanksville, UT, just downstream from the confluence of Muddy Creek and the Fremont river.

== See also ==
- List of Utah rivers
- List of tributaries of the Colorado River
