= San Rafael Swell =

Geologic formation in Emery County, Utah, United States

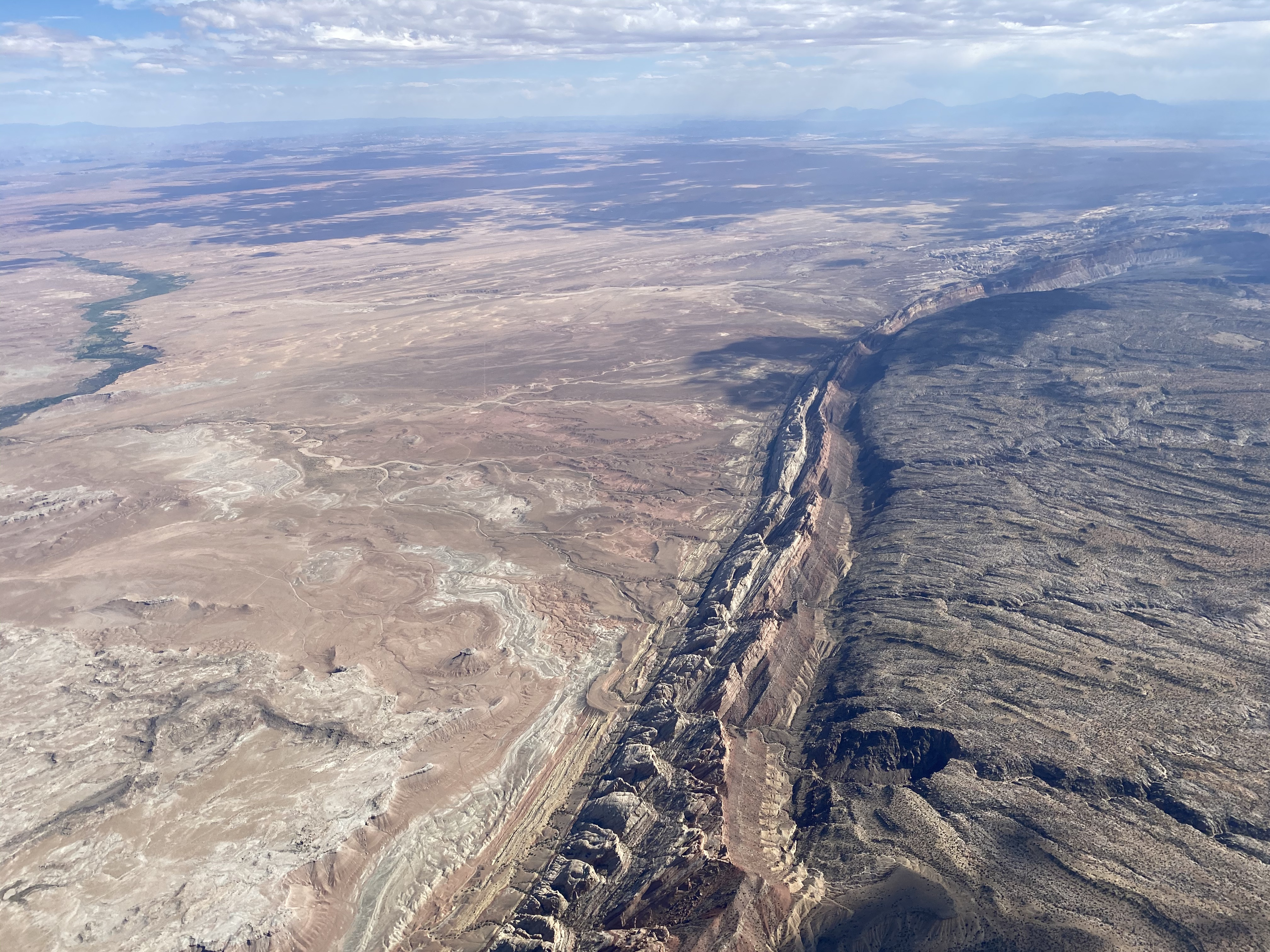
- The San Rafael Swell from 16,000 feet (4,900 m)

Highest point
- Coordinates: 38°48′47″N 110°51′18″W

Dimensions
- Length: 75 mi (121 km)
- Width: 40 mi (64 km)

Geography
- Location within Utah
- Location: Colorado Plateau, Utah, US

The San Rafael Swell is a large geologic feature located in south-central Utah, United States about 16 miles (26 km) west of Green River. Measuring approximately 75 by 40 miles (121 by 64 km), the swell consists of a giant dome-shaped anticline of sandstone, shale, and limestone that was pushed up during the Paleocene Laramide Orogeny 40–60 million years ago. Since that time, infrequent but powerful flash floods have eroded the sedimentary rocks into numerous valleys, canyons, gorges, mesas, buttes, and badlands.

The swell is part of the Colorado Plateau physiographic region.

== Geography ==
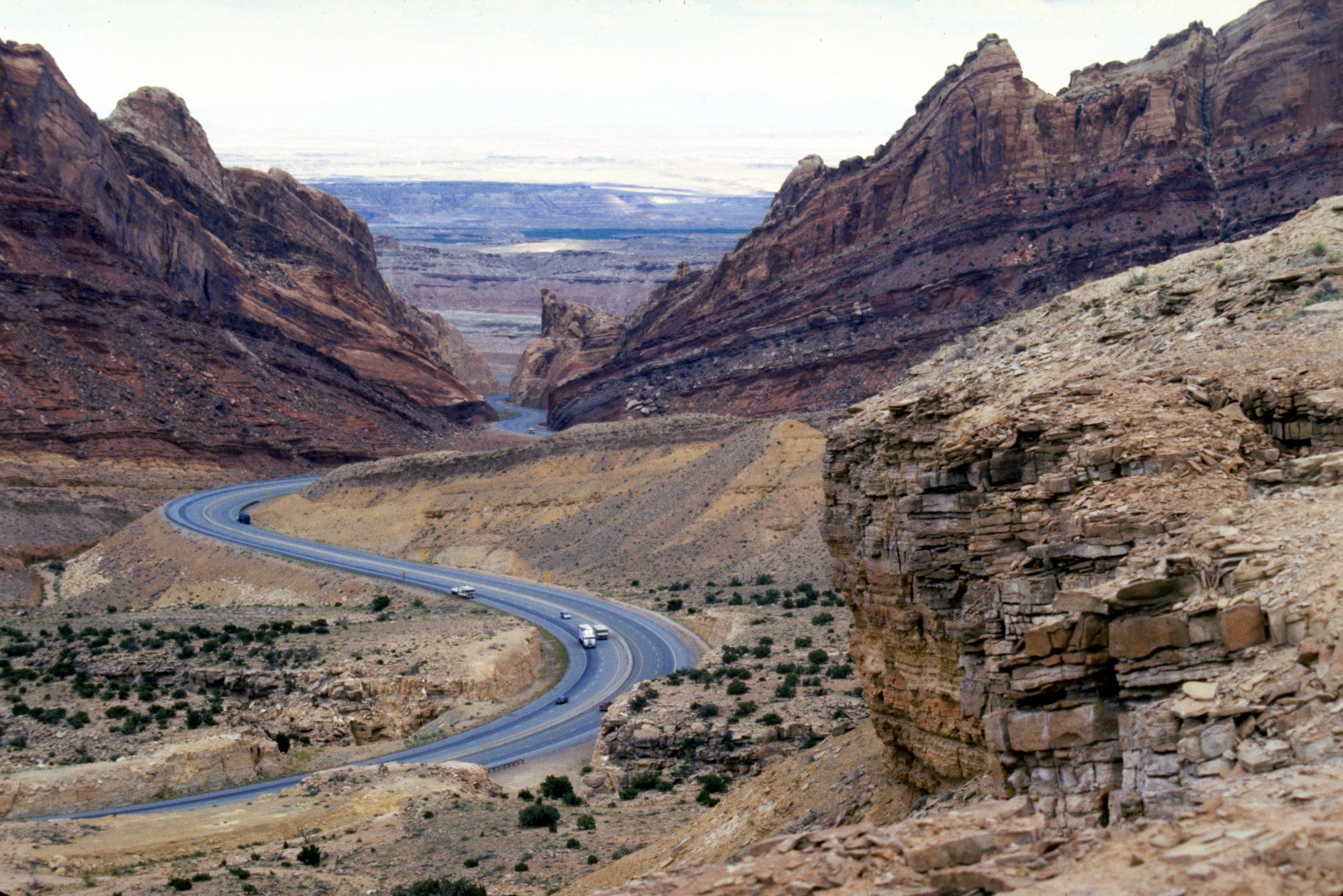
Interstate 70 in the San Rafael Swell

Interstate 70 divides the Swell into northern and southern sections, and provides the only interstate access to the region. The swell lies entirely within Emery County. The northern Swell is drained mainly by the San Rafael River, while the southern Swell is drained mainly by Muddy Creek, which eventually joins the Fremont River to become Dirty Devil River northeast of Hanksville, Utah. The Dirty Devil River flows southward into the Colorado River, while the San Rafael River joins the Green River before it also flows into the Colorado. Muddy Creek cuts into the western edge of the Swell, exits at Muddy Creek Gorge, and then flows across the Blue Hills Badlands near Caineville to its confluence with the Fremont River.

== Geology ==
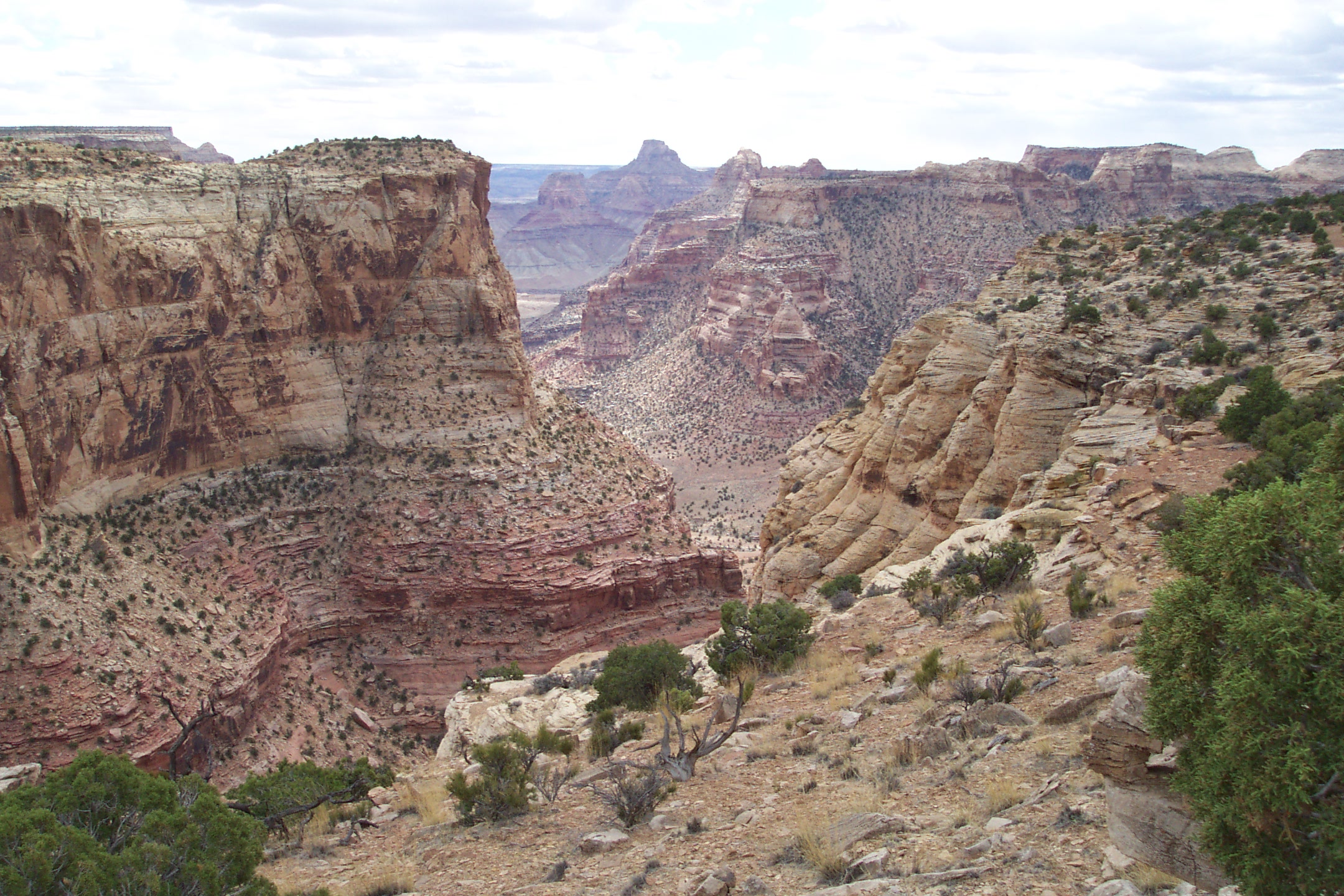
The Little Grand Canyon on the San Rafael River

The San Rafael Swell was formed when deeply buried Precambrian rocks faulted, or broke, during the Laramide orogeny, about 60 million years ago. These "basement" rocks below the present-day Swell moved upwards relative to the surrounding areas and caused the overlying sedimentary rocks to fold into a dome-like shape called an anticline. The resulting structure is analogous to a series of blankets draped over a box.

Since that time, the relentless force of running water has eroded the geologic layers, resulting in older rocks becoming exposed in the middle of the Swell, and younger rocks exposed around the edges. Many of the most impressive landforms are composed of more resistant rocks, including the Jurassic Navajo Sandstone, Jurassic Wingate Sandstone, and Permian Coconino Sandstone. The folding is much steeper on the eastern edge of the Swell than in the west, and this eastern edge is referred to as the San Rafael Reef.

Both the San Rafael River and Muddy Creek drain out of the high Wasatch Plateau and they cut directly across the uplift of the Reef, which marks them as superimposed streams, pre-dating the time of the uplift. Part of the Swell has geographic features that resemble Mars. The Mars Society decided to set up the Mars Desert Research Station in the area as a Mars analog for such reasons.

== Ecology ==
The San Rafael Swell is an area of high plant endemism, with many native plants occurring nowhere else in the world. An example is the endangered San Rafael cactus (Pediocactus despainii).

== History ==
Evidence of Native American cultures, including the Fremont, Paiute, and Ute, is common throughout the San Rafael Swell in the form of pictograph and petroglyph panels. Examples are the Millsite Rock Art and the Buckhorn Draw Pictograph Panel, with rock art left by the Barrier Canyon Culture and the Fremont Culture. From about 1776 to the mid-1850s the Old Spanish Trail trade route passed through (or just north of) the Swell. In the past 150 years, areas of the Swell have been used for the grazing of sheep and cattle, as well as for uranium mining. Many of the gravel roads in the interior of the swell were originally used to service the uranium mining activities. Although surrounded by the communities of Price, Green River, Hanksville, Ferron, Castle Dale, and Huntington, the Swell itself does not support permanent residents.

The Swell has been used by Hollywood filmmakers as a location setting for alien planets, including the Vulcan in the 2009 film Star Trek and the alien world in Galaxy Quest.

In 2002, Governor Mike Leavitt of Utah proposed the creation of a San Rafael Swell National Monument. President George W. Bush, who had authority to create such a monument under the Antiquities Act, never acted on Leavitt's proposal.

The idea of federal designation of the San Rafael Swell as a national monument resurfaced in 2010 in a US Department of the Interior document.

In May 2018, US Representative John Curtis put forward a bill to make the area a national monument, to be called "Jurassic National Monument."

== San Rafael Recreation Area ==
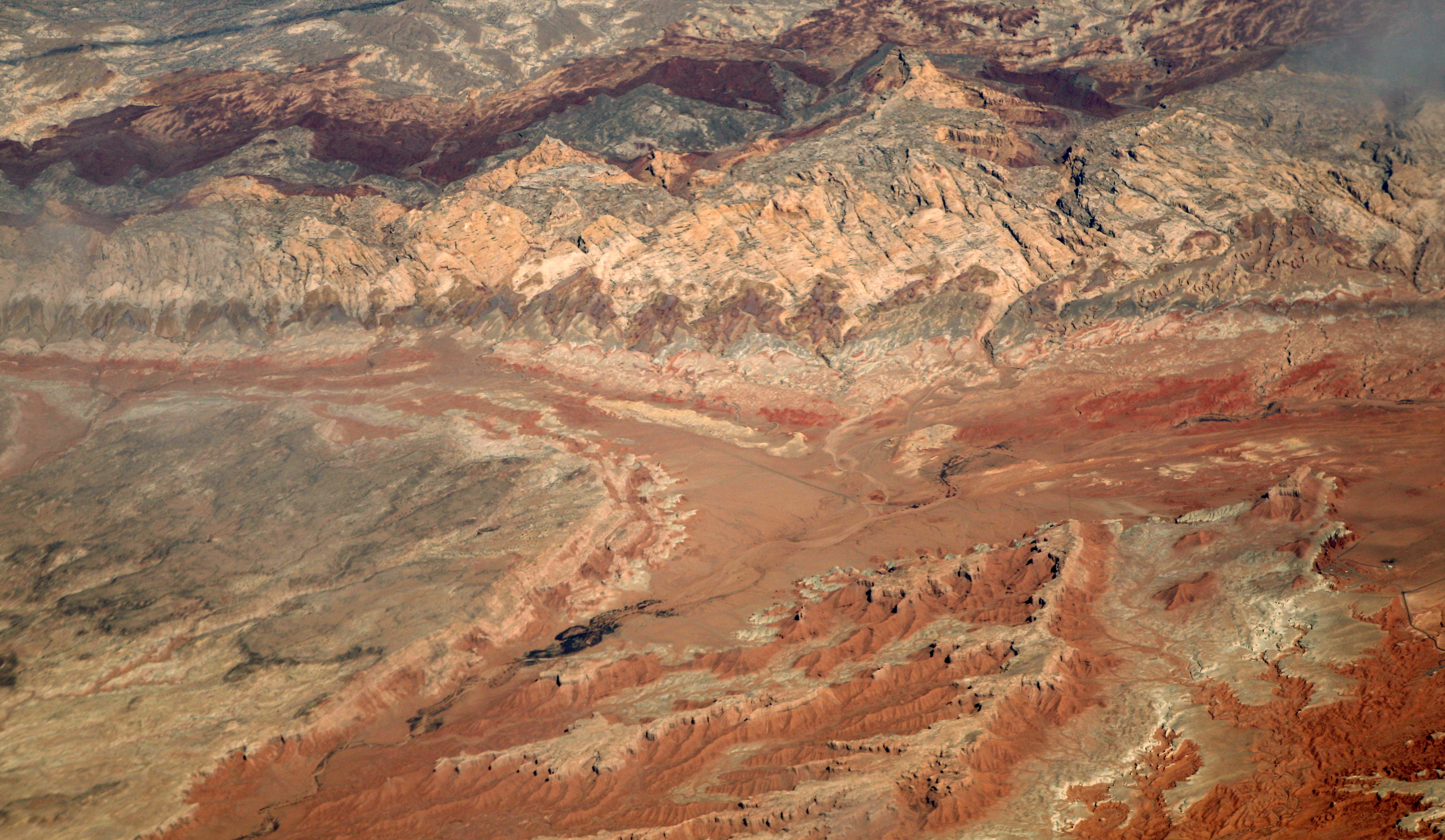
Aerial view of San Rafael Desert. Goblin Valley is at lower extreme right, with Wild Horse Butte to the left. The shadow of a contrail marks the San Rafael Reef, with the Swell behind it.

The area is managed by the US Bureau of Land Management. On March 12, 2019, the Emery County Public Land Management Act was signed into law as the Dingell Natural Resources Act. As part of this designation, approximately 217,000 acres were protected as the San Rafael Swell Recreation Area.

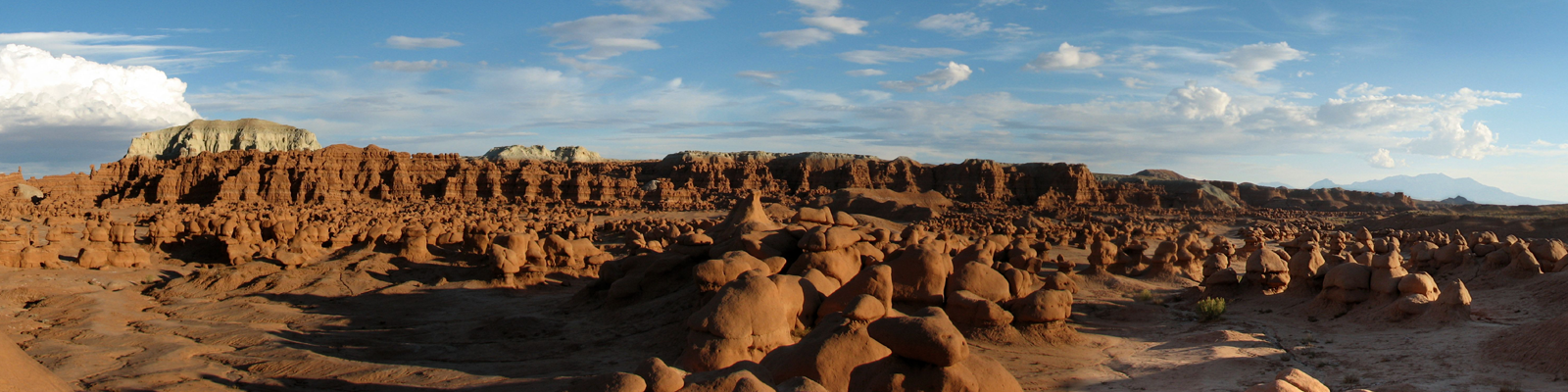
Goblin Valley State Park

The following wilderness areas were congressionally designated around the San Rafael Swell Recreation Area as part of the John D. Dingell. Jr. Conservation, Management, and Recreation Act: Big Wild Horse Mesa (18,192 acres), Cold Wash (11,001 acres), Devil's Canyon (8,675 acres), Eagle Canyon (13,832 acres), Horse Valley (12,201 acres), Little Ocean Draw (20,660 acres), Little Wild Horse Canyon (5,479 acres), Lower Last Chance (19,339 acres), Mexican Mountain (76,413 acres), Middle Wild Horse Mesa (16,343 acres), Muddy Creek (98,023 acres), Red's Canyon (17,325 acres), San Rafael Reef (60,442 acres), and Sid's Mountain (49,130 acres).

Cattle grazing is only allowed in parts of the Swell that are not designated as such. The San Rafael Swell is also dotted with sections of land managed by the Utah School and Institutional Trust Lands Administration, as is much of the state of Utah. Goblin Valley State Park is on the southeastern edge of the San Rafael Swell.

== Recreation ==
The San Rafael Swell attracts hikers, backpackers, horseback riders, trail runners and all-terrain vehicle (ATV) enthusiasts. Many steep, narrow slot canyons popular with technical canyoneers are found in the San Rafael Reef.

The Eastern Reef is a possible destination for rock climbers. It is home to some of the longest and sandiest climbing routes in Southeastern Utah, and was, at least by one person, nicknamed the Sandstone Alps.

== Gallery ==
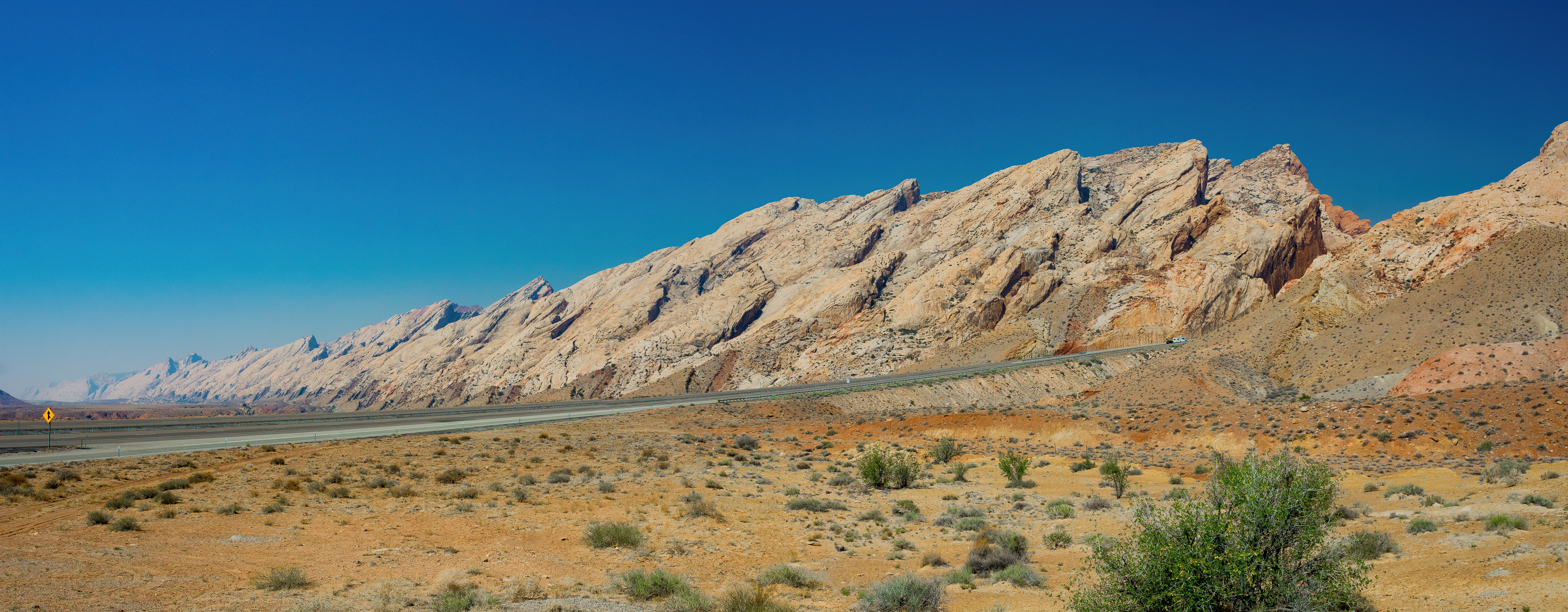
San Rafael Swell, looking westward, with US Interstate 70 passing through

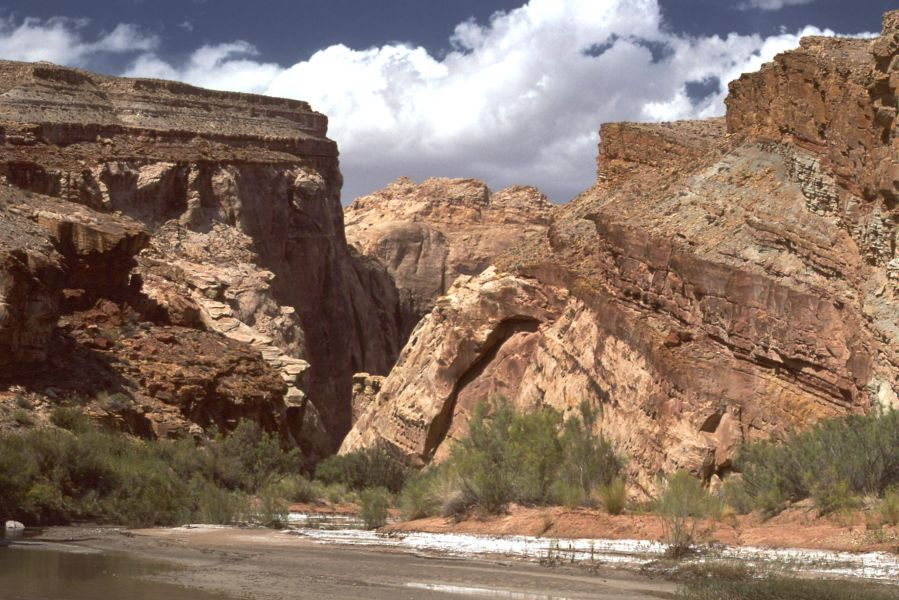
Entrance to the Muddy Creek Gorge

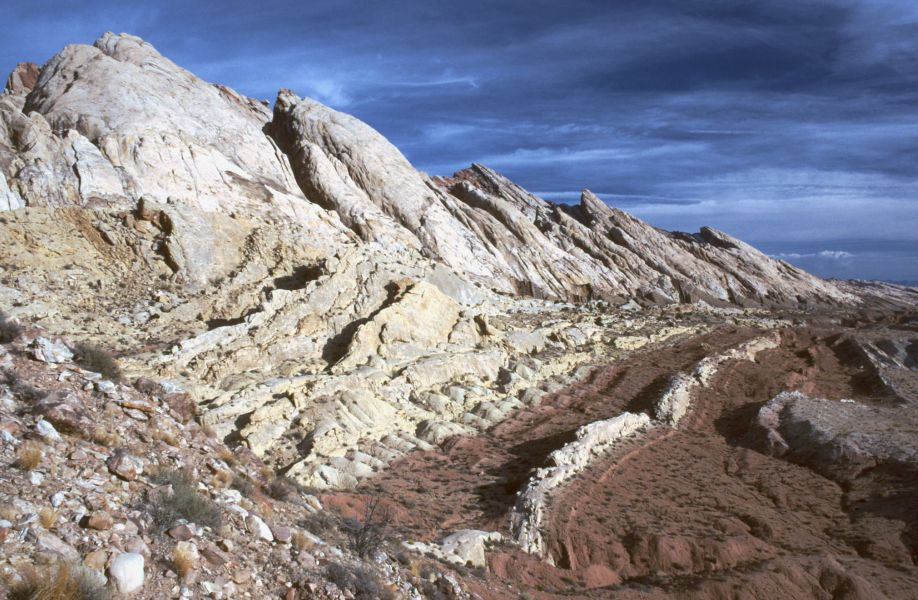
Eastern slope of the San Rafael Reef

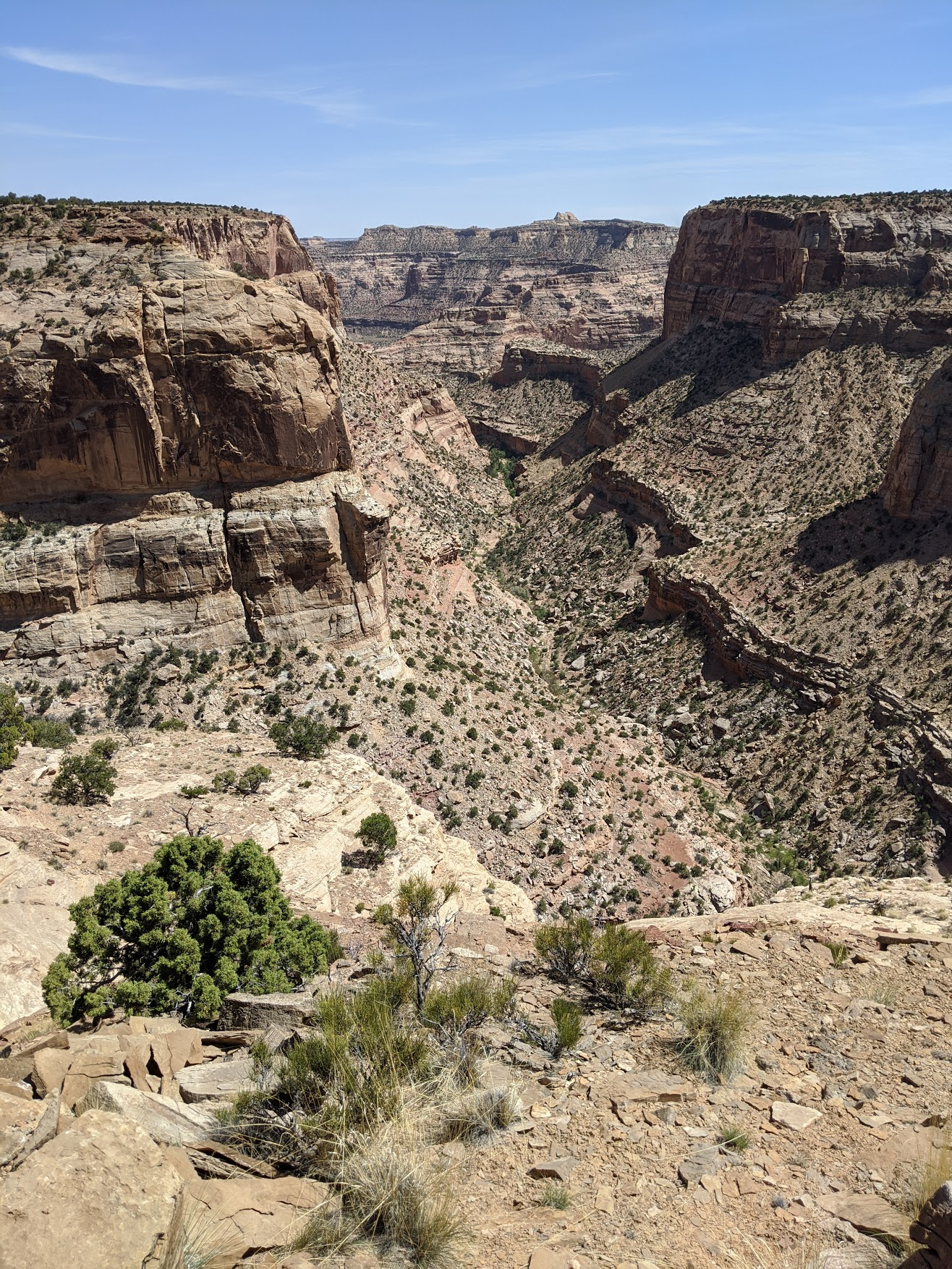
Little Grand Canyon

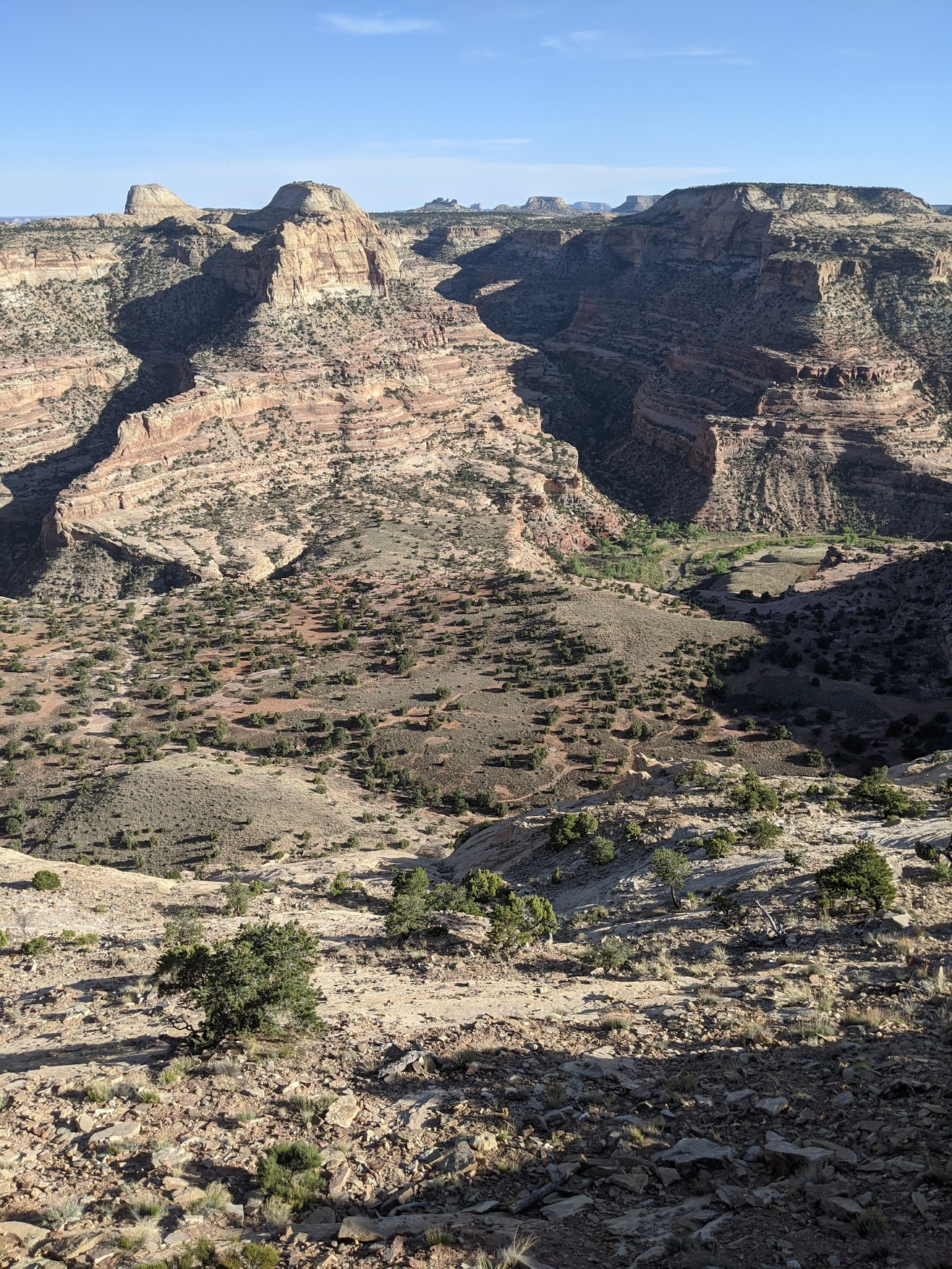
The Wedge Overlook of the Little Grand Canyon

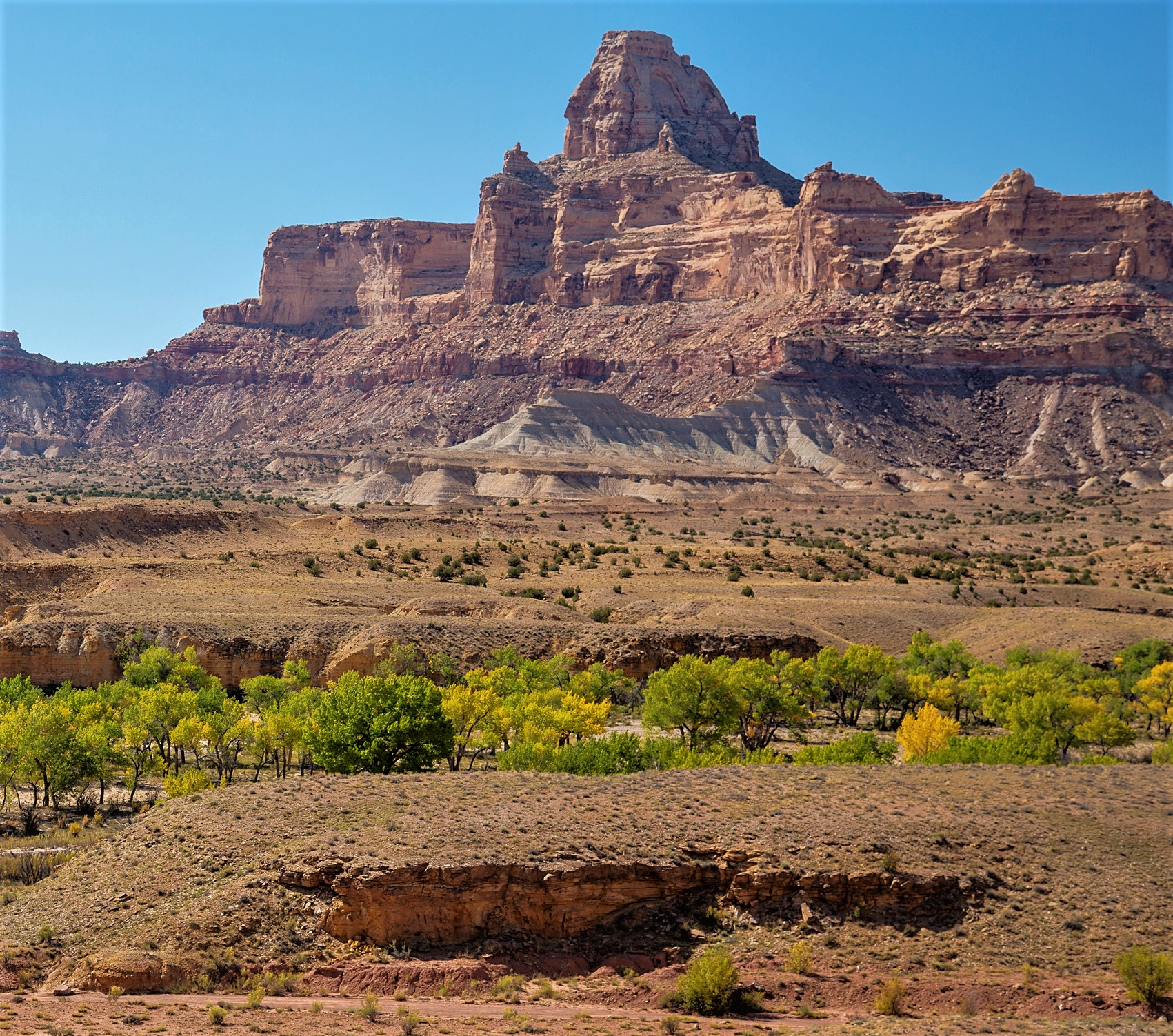
Window Blind Peak

East side of the San Rafael Swell
