= Jesse Ray Ward =

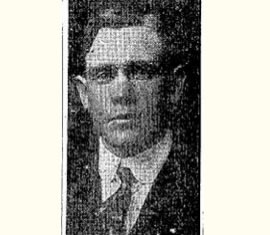
- Born: September 4, 1885; Republic, Kansas, U.S.
- Died: April 15, 1928 (aged 42); Salt Lake County, Utah, U.S.
- Other name: J. Ray
- Police career
- Department: U.S. Marshals Service
- Service years: 1921–1928
- Rank: Captain 145th Artillery, 1917
- Other work: Regimental Adjutant.

Jesse Ray "J. Ray" Ward (September 4, 1885 – April 15, 1928) was a United States Marshal in the closing years of the Old West period. He was appointed a U.S. Marshal by President Harding and was involved in the Posey War of 1923.

== Early life ==
Ward was born in Warwick, Republic, Kansas on September 4, 1885, then part of the American frontier. As a young child, Ward lived with his parents, John Ward and Francis Dancy, in a dugout on a homestead on the Nebraska frontier. The Ward family home was 23 miles south of the Pine Ridge Reservation during the time of the Ghost Dance War. In her family memoir, J.R. Wards' older sister, Bertha, remembers that the Ward children were sitting on the roof of their dugout when they saw the smoke on the horizon from fires to the north. It was at this time, winter 1890/1891, 30 miles north of the Ward homestead, that hundreds of Sioux men, women and children were killed, in what the whites called the Battle of Wounded Knee. It may have been the smoke from these events that the Ward children witnessed. A year later, J.R. Wards' father, John Ward, died of typhoid, and Francis Dancy Ward took her children back to live with her parents in Republic, Kansas.

== Career ==
Jesse Ray Ward attended school and then became a railroad worker. He married Henrietta Gebhart in a baptist ceremony on Christmas Day in 1908. J.R. Ward served in the United States Army in the 145th F.A in Bordeaux, France in the closing days of World War I. He was promoted to regimental adjutant. He was appointed Marshal of Utah in 1921 after serving as commissioner of public safety in Ogden. In February 1923, two young Ute natives robbed a ranch at Cahone Mesa, Utah. The two boys later surrendered to the local sheriff at Blanding but on the first day of their trial, March 20, an incident arose which escalated into the so-called Posey War, the last Indian uprising in American history. The Ute boys fled Blanding with the help of their chief, an old man named Posey, who led his people to Comb Ridge. During the ensuing battle and the days immediately afterward, Posey was wounded and his band was captured by a posse. Chief Posey escaped though, but he died a few days later from his wounds. Marshal Ward was the one Governor Charles Mabey sent to identify Posey's remains when it was found in Comb Wash. Ward buried the chief's body and tried to hide the grave but local settlers exhumed Posey's body at least twice in order to take pictures with it.

== Death ==
Marshal Ward died at the age of forty-two on April 15, 1928. While driving an automobile to West Jordan from Bingham, Ward crashed his car at a turn in the road near 4000 West and Old Bingham Highway. Ward's vehicle left the road, struck a utility pole and turned over. Ward died instantly from injuries to his head and chest. Funeral services were held at Immanuel Baptist Church of which denomination he had been a member since he was 14. All four of his children were raised in this church, to which the family was devoted. He left a wife and four children and is buried at Mount Olivet Cemetery. A bronze name-plaque was later created in his memory, sponsored by Ellis and Katie Ivory.

== Sources ==
- "A Scattered People, An American family Moves West", by Gerald W. Mc Farland, University of Mass 1991. ( A Cousin of J.R. Ward)
- Personal letters of J.R. Ward in the possession of J Ray Paulson, his great grand daughter.
- Ward Family Bible inscriptions.
- Salt Lake City Newspaper obituary 1928
- Official Death Certificate State Of Utah, Salt Lake County, Precinct of South Jordan, State Board of Health File # 630. Undertaker: S.T. Ricketts
- Death Certificate registered by Joseph m Holt Registrar, filed April 18, 1928
- Personal Letters and Memoirs of Bertha Ward. (unpublished). (In possession of J Ray Paulson)
