= Utah State Route 275 =

State highway in Utah, United States

State Route 275

Route information
- Maintained by UDOT
- Length: 3.818 mi (6.144 km)
- Existed: 1975–present

Major junctions
- South end: SR-95
- North end: Natural Bridges National Monument

Location
- Country: United States
- State: Utah

Highway system
- Utah State Highway System; Interstate; US; State; Minor; Scenic
← SR-274	→ SR-276

State Route 275 is a state highway located entirely within central San Juan County, Utah, United States, on the northwestern limits of Cedar Mesa. The highway provides access to the Bears Ears and Natural Bridges National Monument.

== Route description ==
It runs approximately 4 miles (6.4 km) northwest, from the junction of SR-95 (which is two-miles (3 km) west of the SR-95 and SR-261 junction), to the east entrance of Natural Bridges National Monument. The route forms part of the Trail of the Ancients National Scenic Byway.

== History ==
SR-275 was designated by the state legislature in 1975 along a road that had been built in the 1960s.

== Major intersections ==
County	Location	mi	km	Destinations	Notes
San Juan		0.000	0.000	SR-95	Southern terminus
San Juan		3.818	6.144	Natural Bridges National Monument	Northern terminus
1.000 mi = 1.609 km; 1.000 km = 0.621 mi

== See also ==
- List of state highways in Utah
