= Comb Wash =

Valley in Utah, United States

Coordinates: 37.332°N 109.663°W

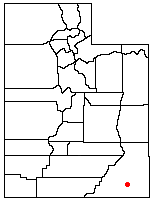
Location of Comb Wash within the State of Utah

Comb Wash is a long narrow valley in south central San Juan County, Utah, United States. It runs from Elk Ridge in the north approximately 35 miles (56 km) to the south, where it merges with the San Juan River at an elevation of about 4,200 feet (1,300 m). The eastern edge of the wash is the Comb Ridge, steep cliffs of Navajo Sandstone, rising in places to 1,000 feet (300 m) above the valley floor. (Although the Comb Wash ends at the San Juan River, the Comb Ridge continues south for about another 40 miles (64 km) into northern Arizona.)

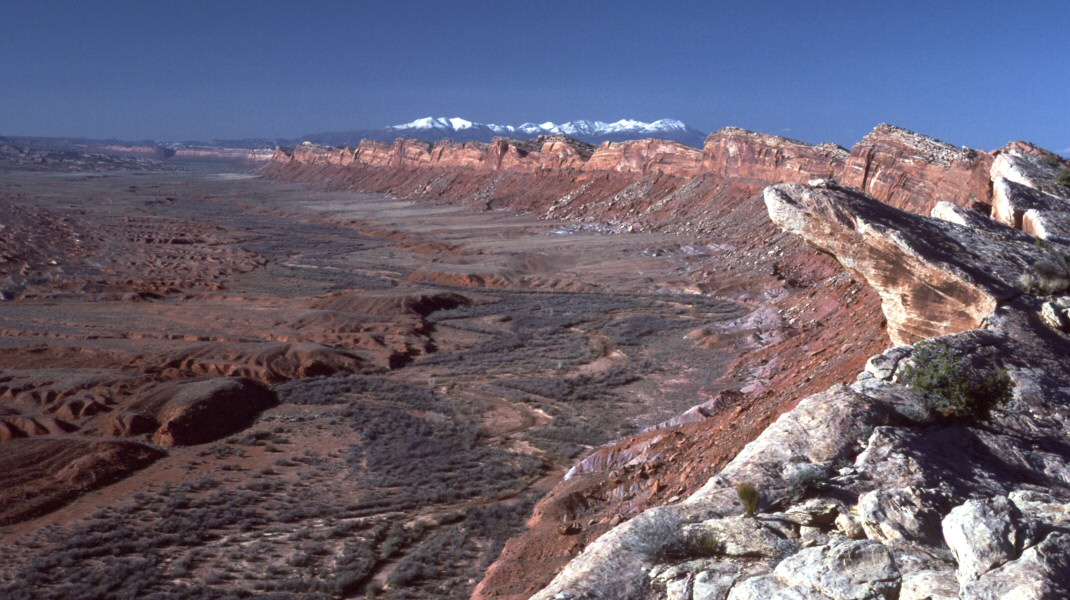
Comb Wash, looking north

On the western edge of Comb Wash is a series of canyons draining Cedar Mesa. To the north is Arch Canyon, which has Texas Canyon as an upper tributary. In the central section are Mule Canyon, Dry Wash, and the combined outlet of Fish and Owl canyons. To the south are McCloyd's Canyon (containing the Moon House ruin) and Road Canyon. Scattered throughout these canyons are cliff dwellings of the Ancestral Puebloans.

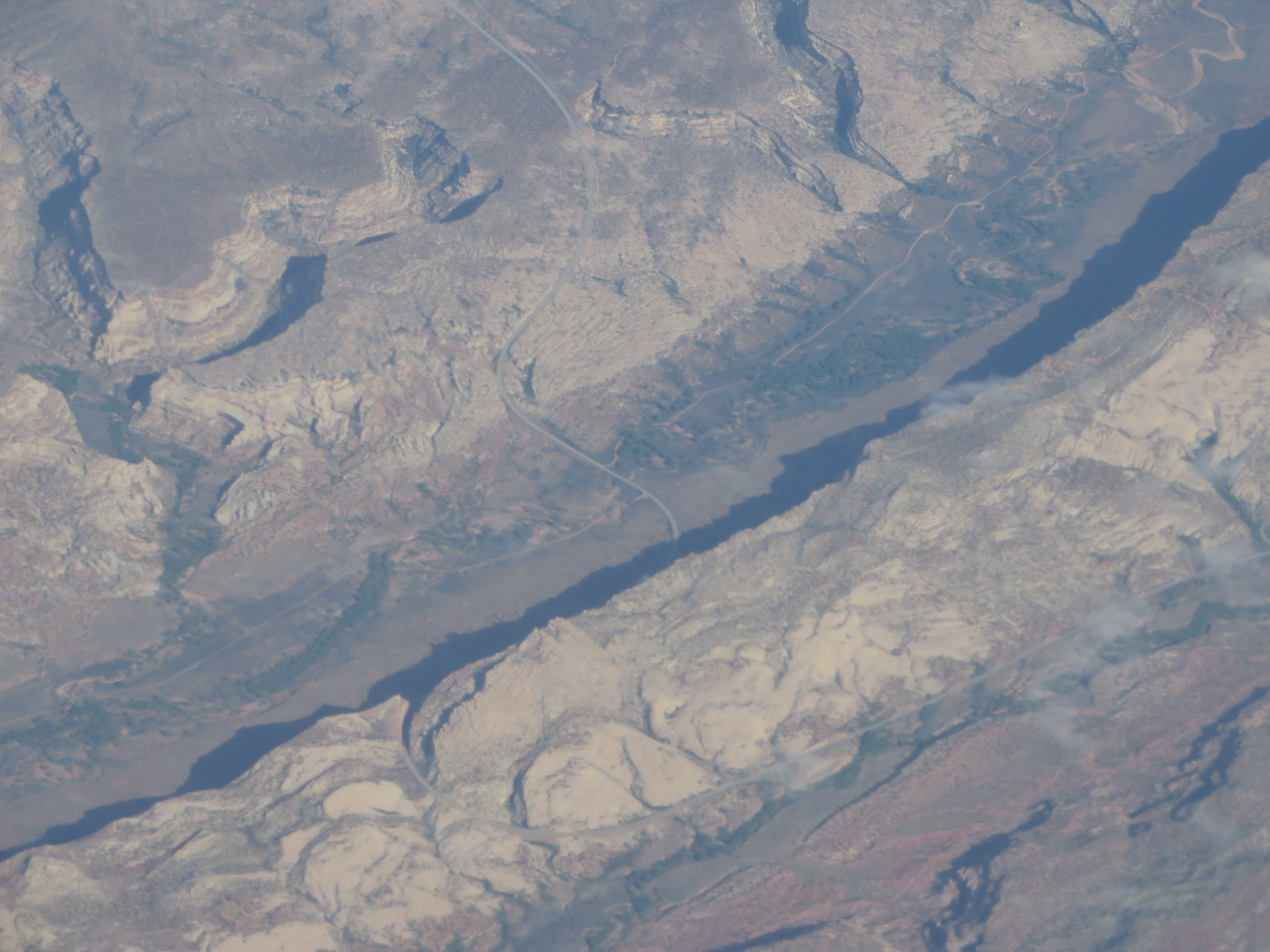
Utah State Route 95 crossing Comb Wash and Comb Ridge

SR-95 crosses the northern part of Comb Wash, while U.S. Route 163 crosses further south. Running along the wash is a primitive road, often impassable after floods. Nearby are the Natural Bridges National Monument, the Grand Gulch Primitive Area, the Valley of the Gods scenic area, and Goosenecks State Park.

== See also ==
- Posey War
- List of rivers of Utah
- List of valleys of Utah
