= Stimper Arch =

Rock formation in Utah, United States

- Rock arch
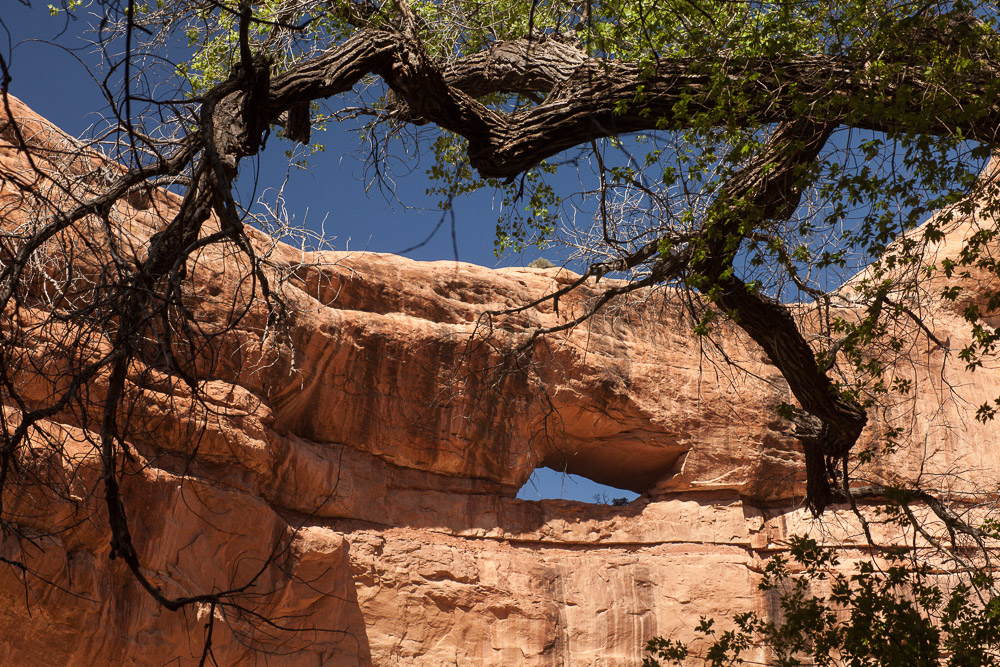
- View of Stimper Arch

- Location within Utah
- Coordinates: 37°30′28″N 109°56′40″W
- Location: Kane Gulch, Utah, United States

Dimensions
  - Width: 20 ft (6.1 m)
  - Height: 6 ft (1.8 m)
- Elevation: 5,939 ft (1,810 m)

Stimper Arch is a rock formation in the wall of Kane Gulch on the Cedar Mesa plateau in southeast Utah, in the United States. The arch has a span of 20 feet and an opening height of 6 ft, and is located about 3.75 miles from the Kane Gulch Ranger Station Stimper Arch is a popular subject for amateur photographers as well as a destination for many hikers.
