= Fry Canyon, Utah =

Fry Canyon
- Ghost town
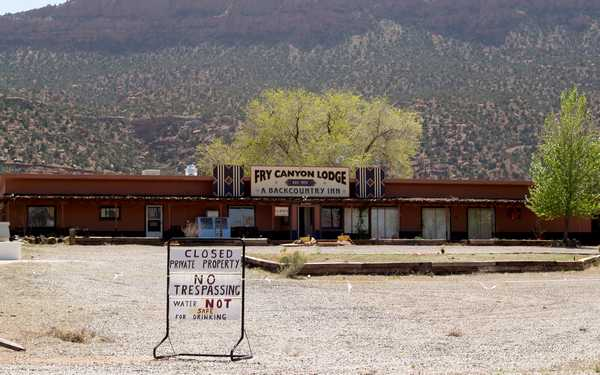
- Fry Canyon Lodge, one of the few structures in the area, April 2006

- Location within Utah Location within the United States
- Coordinates: 37°38′06″N 110°09′24″W
- Country: United States
- State: Utah
- County: San Juan
- Founded: 1950s
- Abandoned: Late 1950s
- Named for: The canyon of the same name
- Elevation: 5,374 ft (1,638 m)
- GNIS feature ID: 1435562

Fry Canyon was a small community in San Juan County, Utah, United States, located in Fry Canyon, just south of White Canyon, 50 miles (80 km) west on State Route 95 from its junction with U.S. Route 191 at Blanding.

== Description ==
Fry Canyon was a uranium boom town during the 1950s, and the Fry Canyon Lodge opened in 1955, but it has since closed in 2007. The tiny hamlet, now a ghost town, is 19 miles (31 km) west-southwest of Woodenshoe Butte, and 8 miles (13 km) west-northwest of Natural Bridges National Monument.

The activities of a uranium ore upgrader mill (1957-1960) and a subsequent copper heap leach operation (1963-1968) at Fry Spring, two miles southeast of Fry Canyon, caused uranium, copper and radium contamination of groundwater in colluvial channel deposits within Fry Creek. The U.S. Geological Survey (with funding from the U.S. Environmental Protection Agency, and other agencies) installed three permeable reactive barriers, containing three different reactive materials (foamed zero-valent iron (ZVI) pellets, bone charcoal pellets, amorphous ferric oxyhydroxide (AFO) slurry mixed with pea gravel), at the site, which is managed by the U.S. Bureau of Land Management.

== See also ==
- List of ghost towns in Utah
