= Utah State Route 276 =

State highway in Utah, United States

State Route 276

Route information
- Maintained by UDOT
- Length: 89.815 mi (144.543 km)
- Existed: 1965–present

Major junctions
- West end: SR-95 at Trachyte Junction
- East end: SR-95 near Natural Bridges National Monument

Location
- Country: United States
- State: Utah

Highway system
- Utah State Highway System; Interstate; US; State; Minor; Scenic
← SR-275	→ SR-279

State Route 276 is a state highway in remote portions of San Juan County, eastern Garfield County, and Kane County, in the southeast of the U.S. state of Utah. The route is used as an access to Lake Powell, serving the small resort towns of Ticaboo and Bullfrog. Historically, SR-276 crossed Lake Powell via the Charles Hall Ferry (originally called the John Atlantic Burr Toll Ferry), the only auto ferry in the state of Utah; however, the ferry is currently out of service due to low water levels. The entire route is part of the Trail of the Ancients National Scenic Byway. Lake Powell separates the route into two sections; the eastern section was numbered State Route 263 prior to the existence of the ferry.

== Route description ==
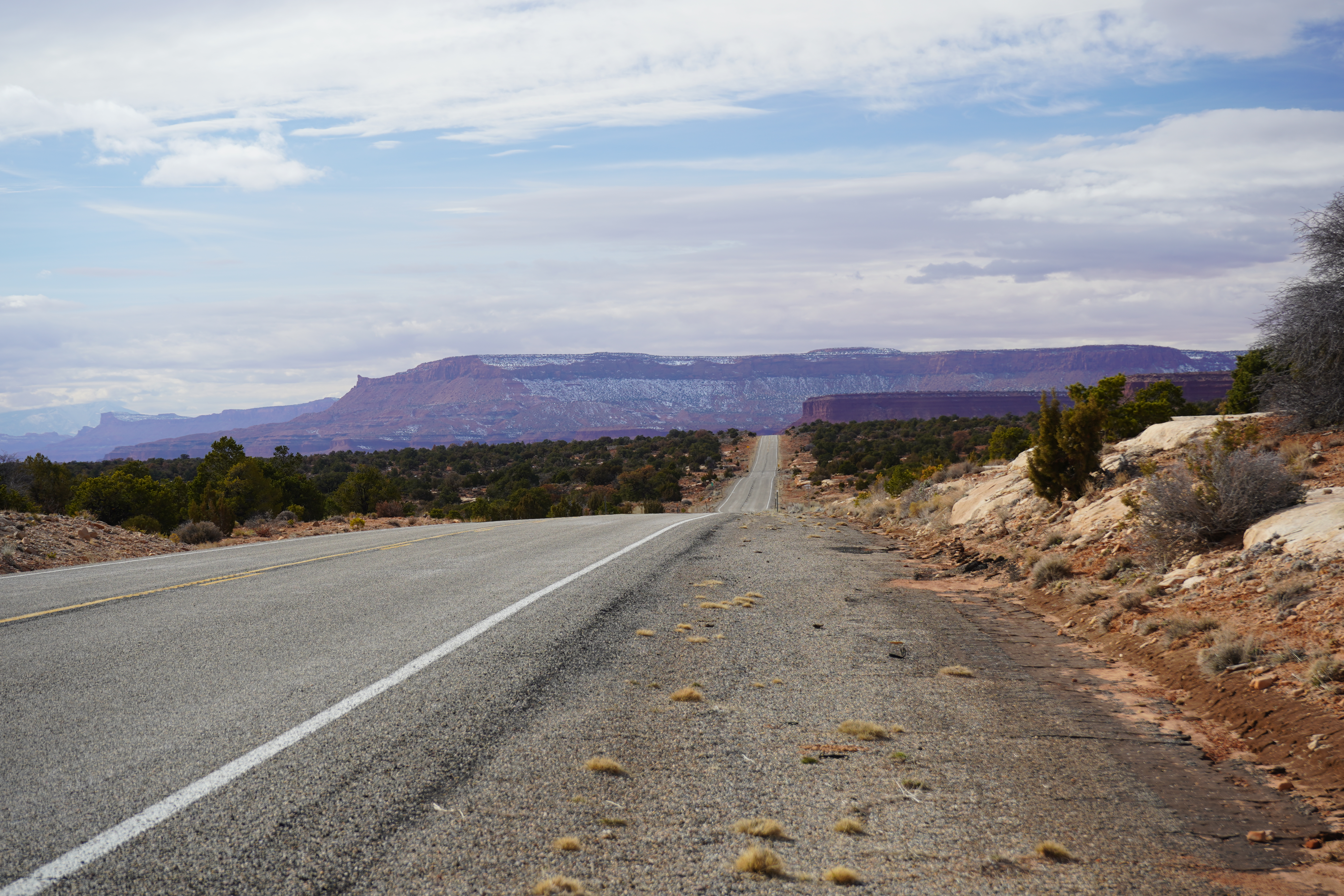
Near eastern terminus

Separated by the Colorado River, Lake Powell, and Glen Canyon, SR-276 is in two sections. When water levels permit ferry operation, the two sections are connected via the Charles Hall Ferry, originally called the John Atlantic Burr Toll Ferry. The first section runs 43 miles (69 km) south-southwest, from the junction of SR-95 northeast of Mount Hillers to the Colorado River and Bullfrog (also called Bullfrog Basin). The second section runs east-northeast for 49 miles (79 km), from the marina and ferry at Halls Crossing, to rejoin State Route 95 near Natural Bridges National Monument. The northern section of SR-276 passes through the tiny community of Ticaboo along the way. The state of Utah's administrative portion of the highway ends at the boundary of the Glen Canyon National Recreation Area (northern portion 35 miles (56 km), southern portion 36 miles). The U.S. Department of the Interior maintains the road surface within the Glen Canyon National Recreation Area. The ferry is the only auto ferry in the state of Utah, resulting in the Utah Department of Transportation frequently having to hire contractors and employees from out of state to maintain and operate the ferry.

== History ==
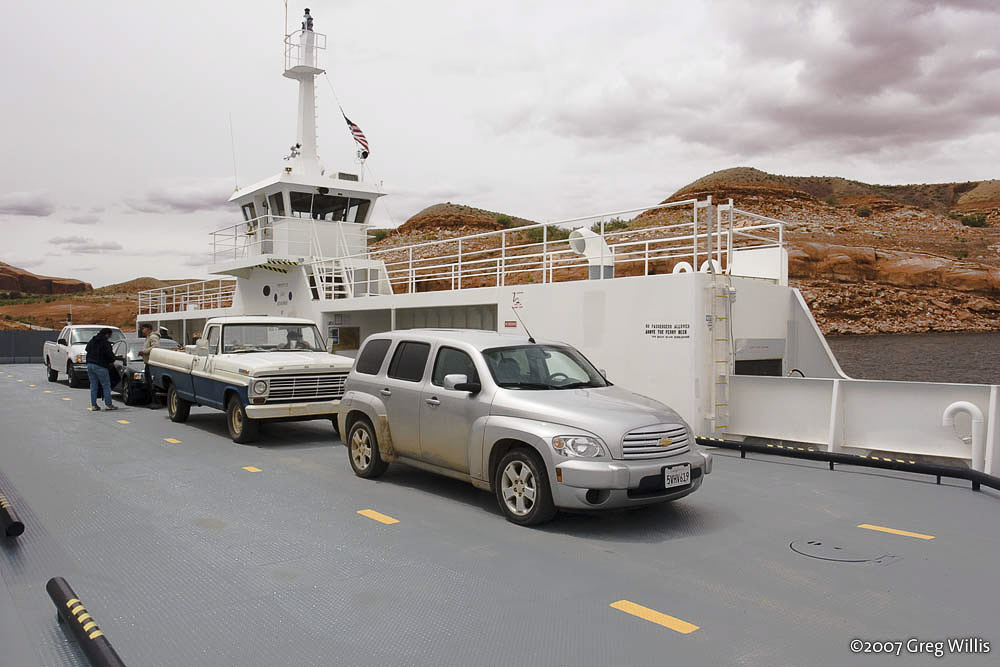
The ferry

The State Road Commission designated SR-276 in 1965, linking SR-95 with the Bullfrog Basin portion of the new Glen Canyon National Recreation Area. The original planned alignment followed an existing unpaved county road, beginning at the former alignment of SR-95 at Trachyte Junction (roughly 38°02′17″N 110°37′23″W) and heading generally south to the junction of Shitamaring Creek and Lost Spring Wash. The proposed road continued down Shitamaring Creek and Hansen Creek to the recreation boundary. However, when built in the late 1960s, the final route was east of the existing county road, only joining the initial proposal along Hansen Creek south of Ticaboo.

State Route 263 was created by the state legislature in 1969, connecting the recreation area near Halls Crossing with SR-95 near Natural Bridges National Monument. This was an existing county road, only requiring minor realignments west of Red House Spring. Ferry service between Bullfrog Basin and Halls Crossing began in 1985, and that year SR-276 was extended to absorb SR-263 for continuity.

== Major intersections ==
County	Location	mi	km	Destinations	Notes
Garfield	Trachyte Junction	0.000	0.000	SR-95	Western terminus
Garfield		34.990	56.311	Entrance to Glen Canyon National Recreation Area	State maintenance ends
Garfield–San Juan county line	Bullfrog–Halls Crossing line	40.390	65.001	Charles Hall Ferry across Lake Powell - OUT OF SERVICE	
San Juan		53.743	86.491	Exit from Glen Canyon National Recreation Area	State maintenance begins
San Juan		89.815	144.543	SR-95	Eastern terminus
1.000 mi = 1.609 km; 1.000 km = 0.621 mi: Closed/former
