= Ticaboo, Utah =

Unincorporated community in the state of Utah, United States

- Unincorporated community
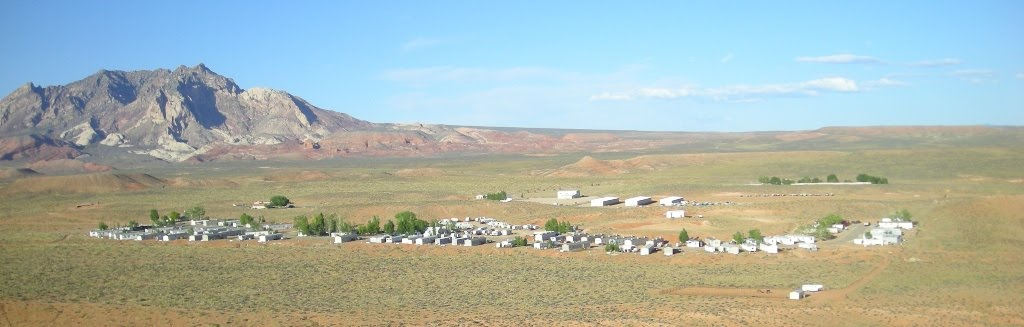
- Image of Ticaboo, with Mt. Ellsworth in the background, May 2008

- Location of Ticaboo within the State of Utah Ticaboo (the United States)
- Coordinates: 37°40′30″N 110°41′48″W
- Country: United States
- State: Utah
- County: Garfield
- Founded: 1977
- Founder: A. Roy May

Government: Utilities are managed by Ticaboo Utility Improvement District
  - Type: Local Improvement District
  - TUID CEO & District Manager: Ticaboo Management, LLC
  - Master Development Lease Holder: Ticaboo Resort, LLC
- Elevation: 4,265 ft (1,300 m)
- Time zone: UTC-7 (Mountain (MST))
  - Summer (DST): UTC-6 (MDT)
- ZIP codes: 84533
- Area code: 435
- GNIS feature ID: 1434980

Ticaboo (/ˈtɪkəbuː/ TIK-ə-boo) is an unincorporated community in far southeastern Garfield County, Utah, United States.

== Description ==
The community lies along State Route 276, more than 90 miles (140 km) east of Panguitch, the county seat of Garfield County. Its elevation is 4,265 feet (1,300 m). It has a post office with the ZIP code 84533. Ticaboo gets its name from Ticaboo Creek, which was named by Cass Hite in the 1880s, from a Paiute word meaning "friendly".

== History ==
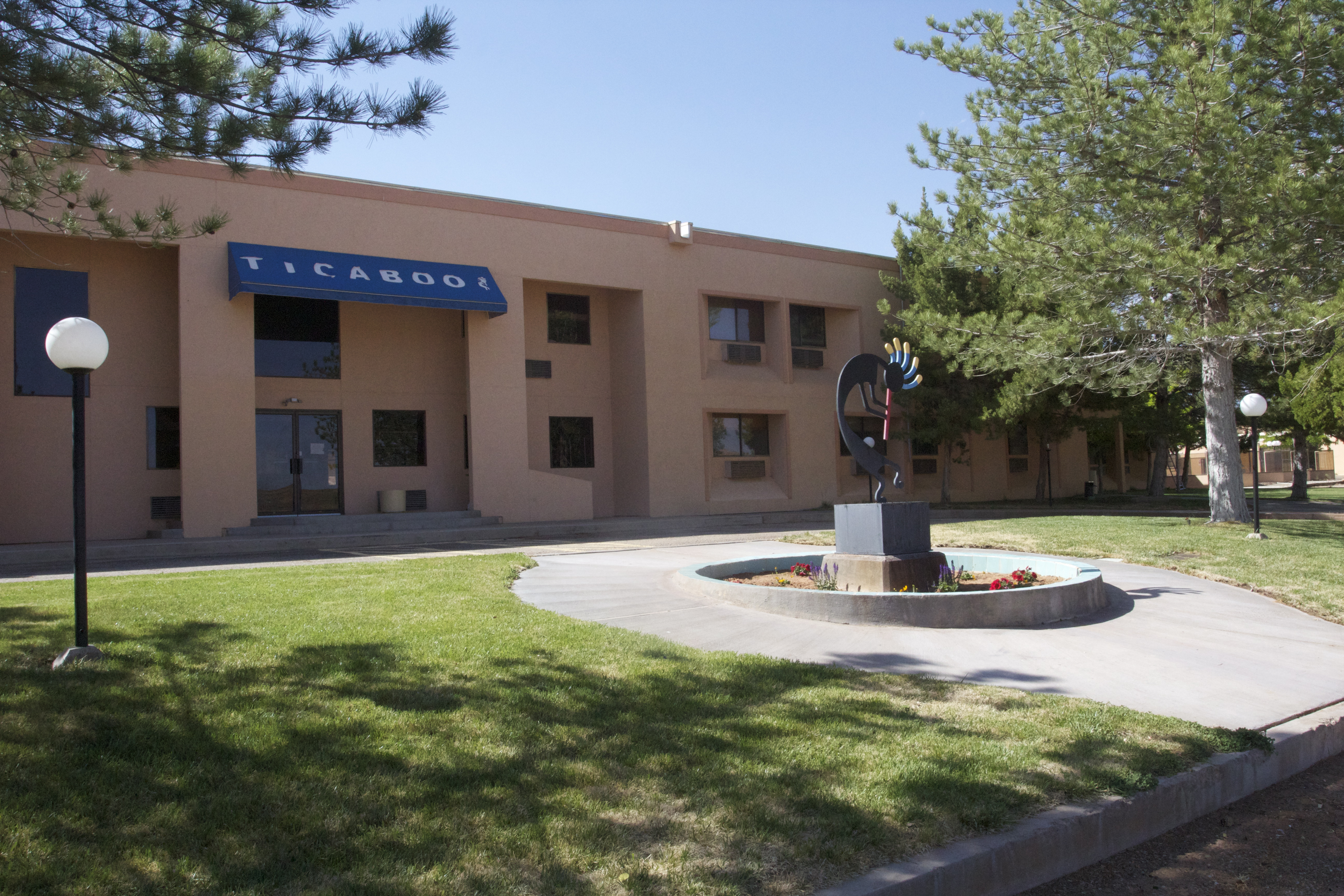
Ticaboo Lodge at the Ticaboo Resort in Ticaboo, May 2012

The Ticaboo townsite is a master-planned community that was organized in the late 1970s to both provide housing to the then booming uranium mining industry in southeastern Garfield County, and tap into the tourism potential of nearby Lake Powell. The Ticaboo Lodge was developed to attract guests visiting the remote area as well as to encourage the development of a tourism base outside of Bullfrog in the northern Lake Powell area.

The first inhabitants of Ticaboo were Kayenta Anasazi. In October 1981, the Division of Utah State History conducted an excavation of a small settlement known as the Ticaboo Town Ruins, located directly west of the town of Ticaboo.

Ticaboo Resort, LLC is the master development lease holder tasked with the development of Ticaboo by the Utah School and Trust Lands Administration (SITLA). Previous master development lease holders have included mining companies who also owned mines in the Henry Mountain Complex, or the Shootaring Mill. Established in 1977, Plateau Resources Limited was the master development lease holder and constructed the infrastructure that still exists today for electric, water, and wastewater.

== Trail of the Ancients ==
Ticaboo is on Utah State Route 276, which is a part of the Trail of the Ancients National Scenic Byway.
