= Posey War =

1923 conflict in Utah with the Ute and Paiute

- Part of the Ute Wars, American Indian Wars
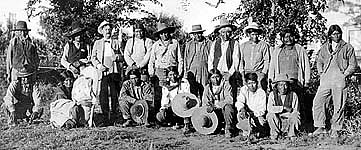
- A group of Ute and Paiute Native Americans who were involved in the Posey War of 1923. Chief Posey is standing second from left.
Date	March 20–23, 1923
Location	San Juan County, Utah
Result	United States victory

Belligerents
United States	Ute; Paiute

Commanders and leaders
(United States) Charles Mabey	Posey †

Casualties and losses
None	2 killed

The Posey War was a small, brief conflict with Native Americans in Utah. Though it was a minor conflict, it involved a mass exodus of Ute and Paiute native Americans from their land around Bluff, Utah to the deserts of Navajo Mountain. The natives were led by a chief named Posey, who took his people into the mountains to try to escape his pursuers. Unlike previous conflicts, posses played a major role while the United States Army played a minor one. The war ended after a skirmish at Comb Ridge. Posey was badly wounded and his band was taken to a prisoner-of-war camp in Blanding. When Posey's death was confirmed by the authorities, the prisoners were released and given land allotments to farm and raise livestock. According to the Utah Encyclopedia, "for the Indians it was not a war and never was intended to be such ... a few shots fired as a delaying action, and a very rapid surrender do not justify elevating an exodus to a war."

== Background ==
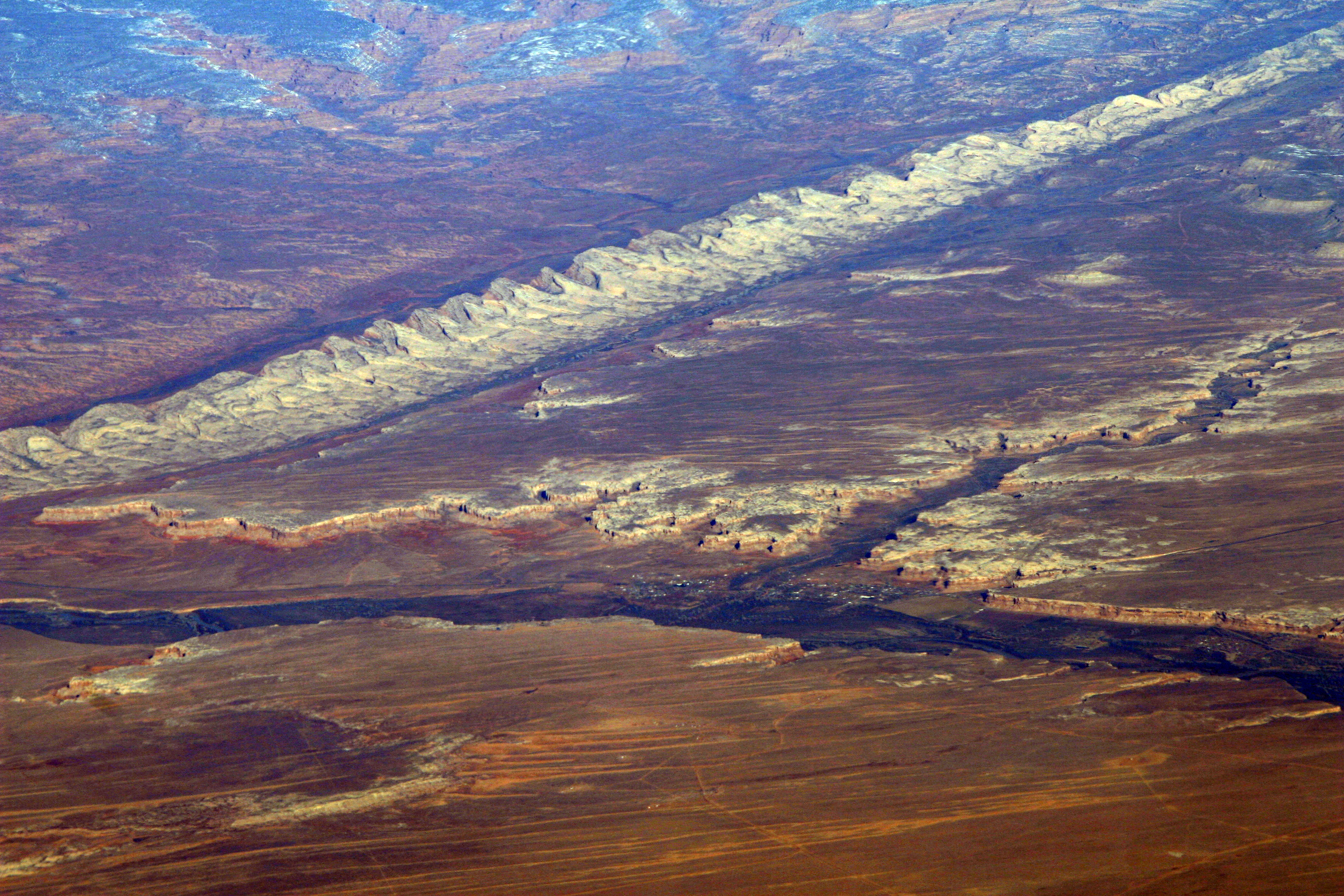
An aerial view of Comb Ridge above Bluff, Utah and the San Juan River.

The Posey War was the last in a long series of conflicts between the United States and the Ute and Paiute tribes. For years prior to 1923, the Avikan Ute people were fighting to maintain their ancestral land in present day San Juan County. Though most of the conflict took place at the negotiating table, there were occasional outbreaks of hostilities, such as the Bluff War in 1915 and the Bluff Skirmish of 1921. By 1923, Chief Posey and members of his band were already well known for their activities in the earlier conflicts. Between 1881 and 1921, Posey's band fought in several engagements against either the local Mormon settlers or other native American tribes. Posey was half Paiute and half Mexican himself though he married into the Ute Mountain tribe; his band included about 100 people, both Ute and Paiute men, women and children. They lived around the outskirts of Bluff, along Allen Canyon, where they could find for the settlers in town. According to one Ute, Posey's band refused to live on the reservation because they felt the natives there were unfriendly.

The Posey War began in February 1923 because of a relatively minor affair in which two young Ute males robbed a sheep ranch at Cahone Mesa, assaulted the owner, slaughtered a calf, and burned a bridge. The boys were members of Posey's band; the first was the youngest son of a man named Joe Bishop and the second the son of Sanup. The two Utes later surrendered to the local sheriff, William Oliver, in Blanding, but while they were in custody they contracted food poisoning and were allowed to go home, with the agreement that they would return for trial. Meanwhile, the robbery and assault at Perkins ranch was used as a reason to begin rounding up all of the natives living around Bluff. While some were captured and put in a barbed wire compound in Blanding, the majority abandoned their lands and headed for the wilderness. When the trial began on March 20, the boys arrived back in town. Bishop's son was using a stick as a cane, apparently still feeling ill. Chief Posey and a few of his men attended the trial to try to help the boys and ensure that nothing would jeopardize the fight for their land in San Juan County.

== War ==
=== Blanding Incident ===
The first part of the trial concluded without incident but when the court adjourned at noon, Sheriff Oliver took the two boys to lunch. Sheriff George A. Hurst, who was present at the court proceedings, wrote the following:

Joe Bishop's boy was walking upon a large stick as though he were crippled or incapacitated. ... After hearing evidence presented for and against the accused, Joe Bishop's boy was found guilty and at 12:00 noon he was placed in the hands of Sheriff Oliver, to have lunch. He was to reappear at 3:00 p.m. for sentencing. Immediately upon the adjournment of court, all the white men left and went home for lunch, leaving no one there but the sheriff, George A. Hurst Jr., a few school children, and a band of angry Utes. ... After quite a while trying to persuade the Indian boy to go without any avail, Sheriff Oliver got on his horse, rode up to Joe Bishop's boy ... and insisted that he come along without any further trouble and get their lunch. Whereupon, the young Ute threw away the big stick that he had been walking on, grabbed the reins of the horse the sheriff was riding, and jerking with all his might. At this point, Sheriff Oliver whipped out his gun and attempted to shoot the Indian, but the gun spiked, and would not fire. Joe Bishop's boy grabbed the horn of the saddle with one hand, the other seizing the gun that Oliver held. He wrenched the gun from the sheriff's hand and with one leap, sprang into the saddle of Jess Posey's [Chief Posey's son] race horse with Jess, stood holding and headed north. As he started off he tried to get the gun to work. He had only gone about 200 yards when he succeeded and over his shoulder he shot the sheriff's horse in the neck.

— George A. Hurst

After that Chief Posey fled with his people, closely pursued by a posse in a Ford Model T. Posey opened fire at that point with his .30-06 rifle, disabling the vehicle and temporarily ending the chase. Now that Posey was a wanted man, he went north with his band from their homes in Allen Canyon to the desert around Navajo Mountain. There followed a series of yellow newspaper reports accusing the chief and his band of being either directly or indirectly involved in a number of various crimes, including rape and murder.

=== Battle of Comb Ridge ===
On March 22, the Times-Independent ran an article titled: "Piute Band Declares War on Whites in Blanding" [sic]. The article also said that county commissioners had requested permission from Utah Governor Charles Mabey to allow the use of a military scout plane to bomb and strafe the natives. This was not approved. A $100 reward was placed on Posey's head by the state, dead or alive. C. F. Sloane of the Salt Lake Tribune was in Blanding at the time and wrote hideously inaccurate reports of the situation. Sloane wrote that Blanding was surrounded for "thirty-six hours of terrorism", with Utes in war paint riding through the streets. He also claimed that Posey was forming a "mobile squadron" to rob the San Juan State Bank and that there were "sixty men skilled in the art of mountain warfare awaiting the call to service". On one occasion, a citizen of Blanding asked a newsman why he was not writing the truth; the newsman responded, "We're not ready to go home yet, and if we don't keep something going, we'll be getting a telegram to come home." Rumors began to circulate that another Indian war was about to begin so the Mormon settlers in Blanding and Bluff reacted quickly and mobilized a larger, mounted, posse to find Posey and his followers. They also tried to suppress any outside interference which had caused problems during the earlier conflicts. The posse trailed the chief's band and quickly caught up with them the next day, twenty miles from Blanding, inside a rugged area of desert strewn with canyons. The natives fought an unsuccessful rear guard action, from the top of Comb Ridge, to allow the women and children time to escape. All eventually surrendered though, over the course of the next few days. Posey escaped, but he was wounded by a bullet in one of his hips by a settler named Bill Young while trying to evade capture. Again the newspapers created their own versions of the story, one said that Posey was killed in a flash flood that washed him down a canyon, another said that he died of natural causes, being that he was in his sixties. Many Utes believed poisoned Mormon flour was the culprit but it is generally accepted that Posey died from blood poisoning caused by the gunshot wound. During the fighting, which lasted until March 23, Posey allegedly shot and killed the son of Joe Bishop when the two began to argue on top of the ridge. Posey was said to have been angry that Bishop's son and the other boy had caused so much trouble. Other accounts say the Bishop boy was killed by the posse.

== Aftermath ==
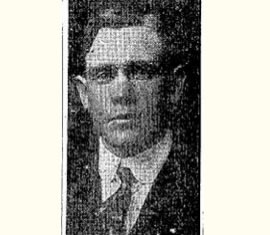
Marshal Jesse Ray Ward in 1921.

Seventy-nine of the Ute and Paiute prisoners were taken to Blanding and put in the compound. They were released a few days later when Posey's body was discovered in Comb Wash. Marshal Jesse Ray Ward was taken to the location of Posey's remains by a party of Utes. There, he officially identified the body and certified the chief's death. Marshal Ward had Posey's body buried in an unmarked grave, with the idea of preventing the patrolling posses from disturbing it. The plan fell through, and the chief's body was exhumed at least twice by those who wanted their picture taken with the corpse.

The last of the Ute Wars was over, and after Posey's band was released from Blanding, they returned to the Allen Canyon area, having received 160 acre land allotments. Chief Polk's band, which participated in the 1915 Bluff War, also received 160 acre allotments around Montezuma Canyon. The natives agreed to abandon their nomadic ways, take up farming, and allow their children to be enrolled in Indian schools. Adjusting to the new way of life was slow for Posey's band, and throughout the 1920s they continued to live in either tents or traditional hogans, a type of earthen hut, while other Utes were living in houses. In 1930, the superintendent of the Consolidated Ute Agency said that the natives of Allen Canyon were "at least 40 years behind the Southern Utes [in their progress toward civilization". Chief Posey and the son of Joe Bishop were the sole fatalities during the conflict. There were no casualties on the Americans' side, though the natives killed one of the posse's horses and narrowly missed several men.

== See also ==
- Paiute War

== Bibliography ==
- Young, Richard K. (1997). The Ute Indians of Colorado in the twentieth century. University of Oklahoma Press. ISBN 0-8061-2968-9.
