= Utah State Route 95 =

State highway in Utah, United States

State Route 95
- Bicentennial Highway

Route information
- Maintained by UDOT
- Length: 121.351 mi (195.296 km)
- Existed: 1935–present

Major junctions
- West end: SR-24 in Hanksville
- SR-276 twice near Lake Powell; SR-275 near Natural Bridges National Monument; SR-261 near Abajo Mountains
- East end: US 191 south of Blanding

Location
- Country: United States
- State: Utah

Highway system
- Utah State Highway System; Interstate; US; State; Minor; Scenic
← SR-94	→ SR-96

State Route 95 or Bicentennial Highway is a state highway located in the southeast of the U.S. state of Utah. The highway is an access road for tourism in the Lake Powell and Cedar Mesa areas, notably bisecting Bears Ears National Monument and providing the only access to Natural Bridges National Monument. The highway does not serve any cities, but the small town of Hanksville is its western terminus. Although the highway has existed since the 1930s as a primitive dirt road, it received its name at its dedication as a paved state highway coincident with the U.S. Bicentennial in 1976. The highway forms part of the Trail of the Ancients National Scenic Byway.

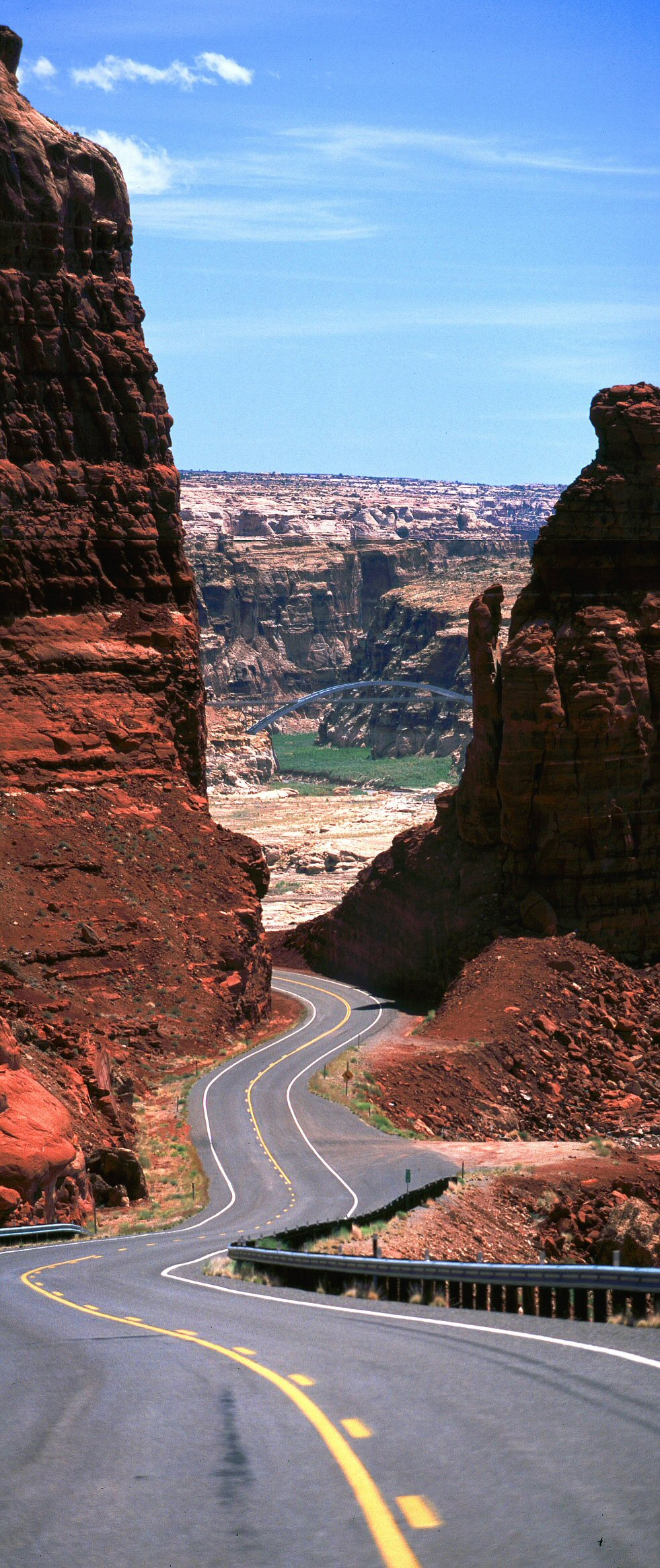
Hite Crossing Bridge and Colorado River

== Route description ==
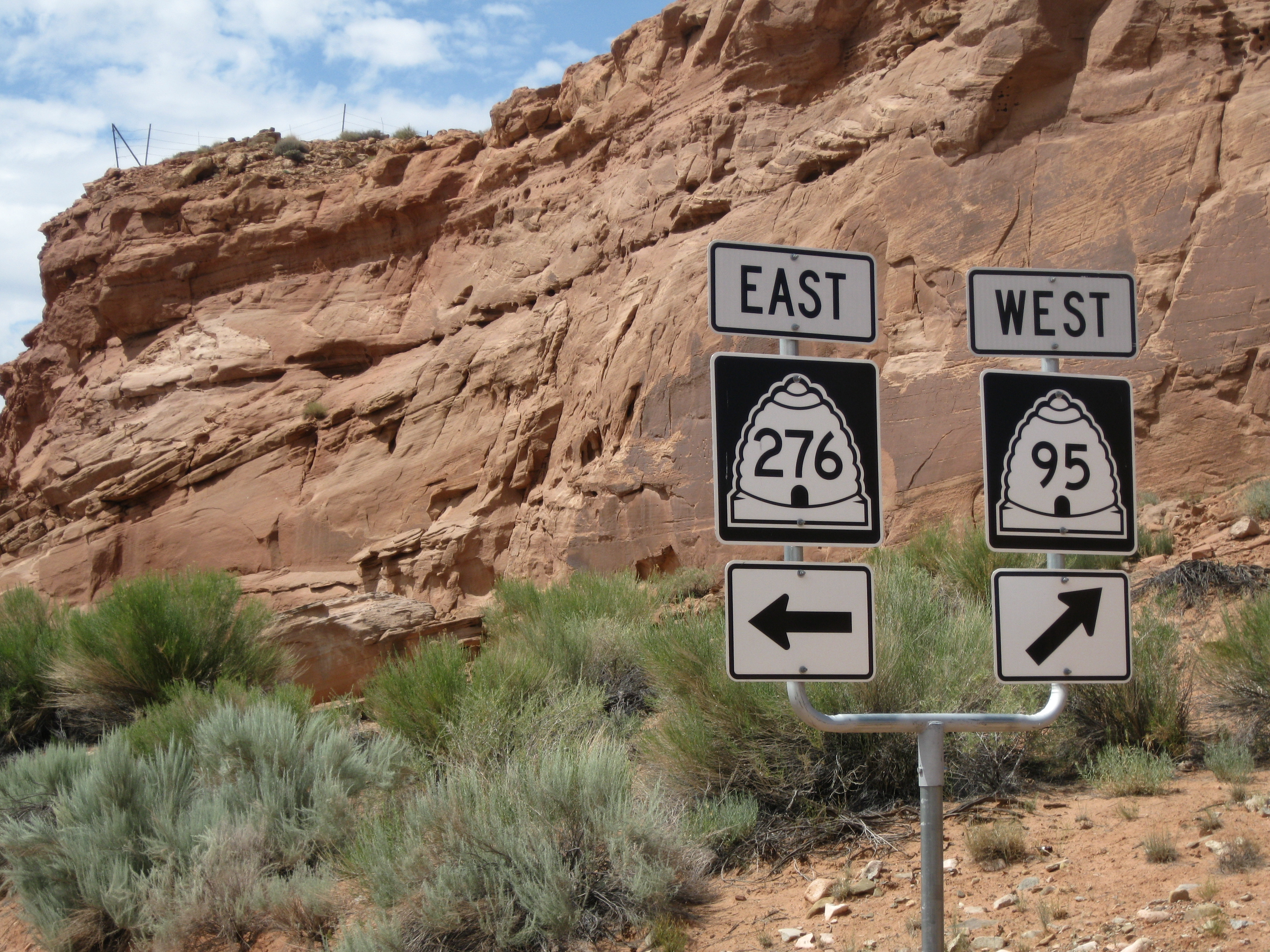
SR-95 approaching SR-276

It runs 121 miles (195 km) west from the junction of U.S. Route 191 (4.3 miles south of the town of Blanding), to the junction of SR-24 in the town of Hanksville. It crosses Cottonwood Wash just west of the US-191 junction; follows and crosses White Canyon; and crosses the Colorado River and the northeast end of Lake Powell at Hite Crossing Bridge, near the confluence of the Dirty Devil River, which it crosses just two miles (3 km) later.

29 miles (47 km) west of the US-191 junction it meets State Route 261 on Cedar Mesa, 2 miles (3.2 km) west of there State Route 275 spurs off to the northwest to Natural Bridges National Monument, and it intersects with State Route 276 twice, on either side of Lake Powell.

It passes by the now closed Fry Canyon Lodge in Fry Canyon, which opened in 1955 and closed in 2007. Fry's Canyon (also referred to as Fry's Gulch) contained the only gas station between Hanksville and Blanding, but it has since closed and there are no services on the route itself. A seasonal gas station is in operation at the Hite Marina area during the summer months.

== History ==
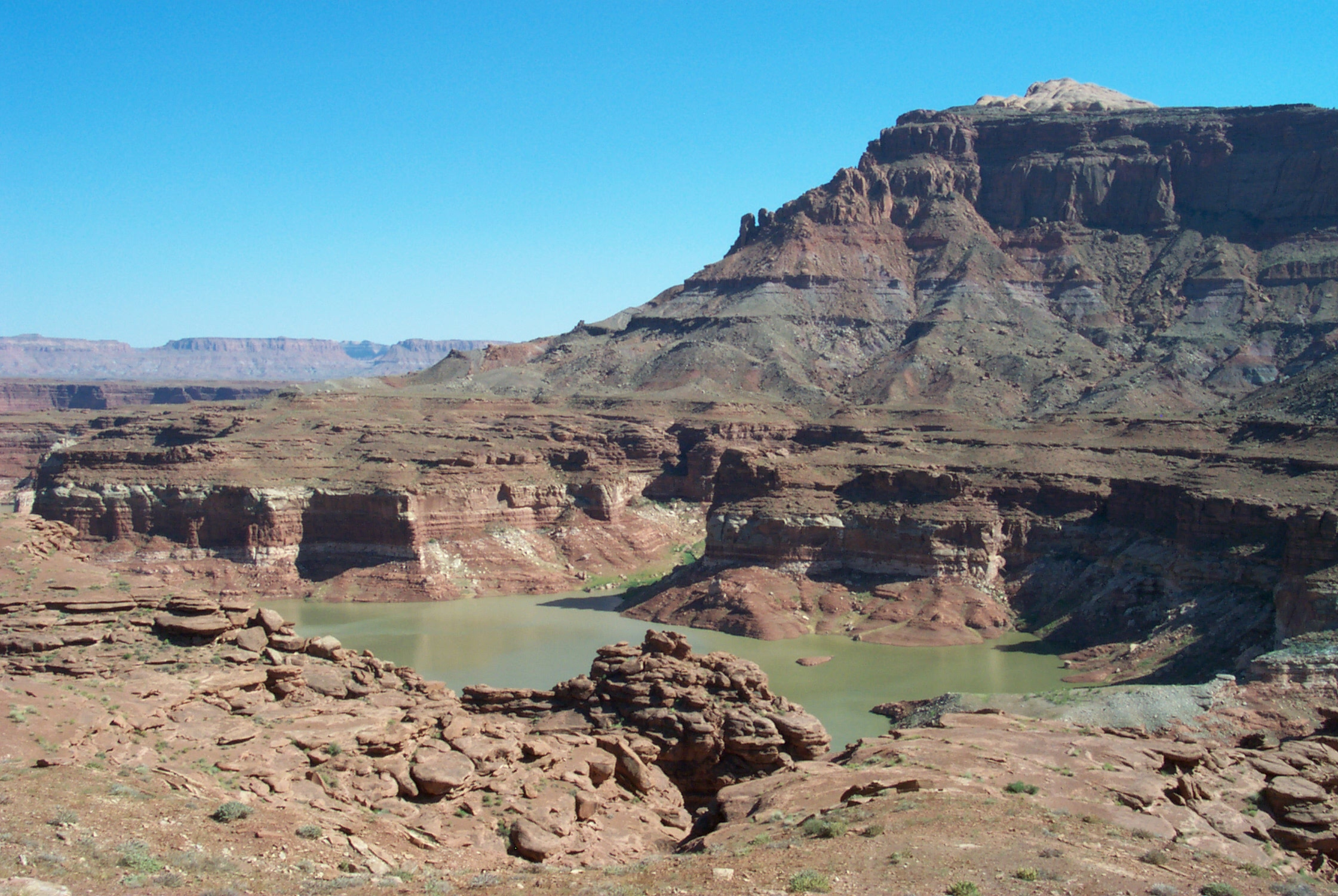
Vista along SR-95

SR-95 was added to the state highway system in 1935 as a spur connecting SR-47 (now US-191) near Blanding with Natural Bridges National Monument. It was extended in 1949, crossing the Colorado River at Hite and continuing to SR-24 at Hanksville. Except for a short piece near Blanding, the road remained unpaved through the 1960s. The first major realignment was approved in 1962 and completed in 1966, bypassing the old crossing at Hite, which is now flooded by Lake Powell, in favor of the new Hite Crossing Bridge. The highway was improved and paved in time for the U.S. Bicentennial in 1976, and has since been known as the Bicentennial Highway.

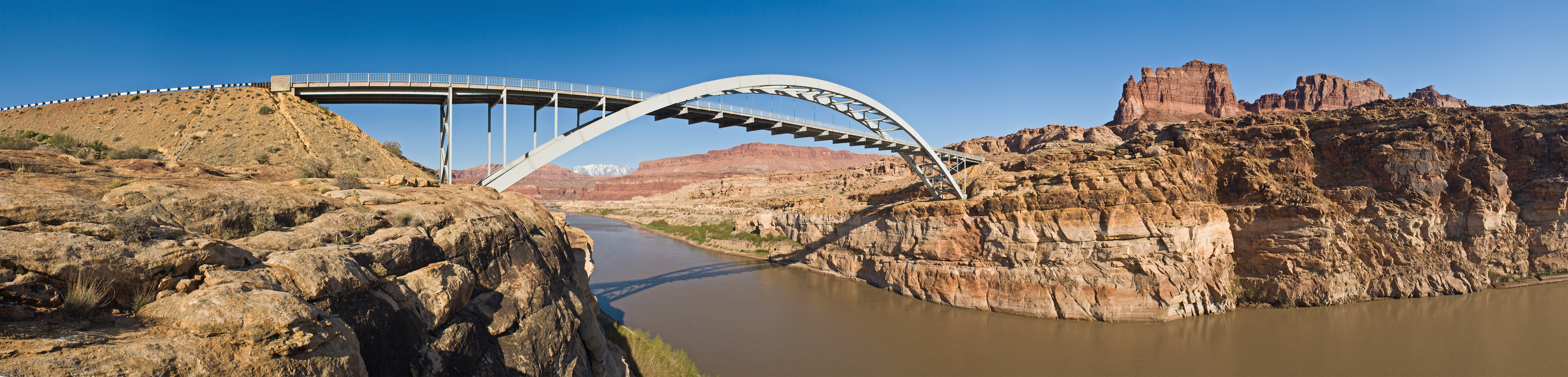
The Hite Crossing Bridge spanning the Colorado River

== Major intersections ==
County	Location	mi	km	Destinations	Notes
Wayne	Hanksville	0	0.0	SR-24 – Green River, Torrey	
Garfield		26.076	41.965	SR-276 – Lake Powell	
Garfield		33.3231	53.6283	Hog Springs Rest Area	
Garfield	Glen Canyon National; Recreation Area	41.176	66.266	Hite Overlook View Area	
Garfield	Glen Canyon National; Recreation Area	43.179	69.490	Information Area	
Garfield	Glen Canyon National; Recreation Area	43.823	70.526	Campgrounds	
San Juan	Glen Canyon National; Recreation Area	52.907	85.146	Lake Powell	
San Juan		56.714	91.272	View Area	
San Juan		83.517	134.408	SR-276 – Lake Powell–Bullfrog Marina	
San Juan		91.137	146.671	SR-275 – Natural Bridges National Monument	
San Juan		92.931	149.558	SR-261 – Mexican Hat, Bluff, Cedar Mesa, Moki Dugway	
San Juan		96.995	156.098	Salvation Knoll View Area	
San Juan		101.425	163.228	Indian Ruins	
San Juan		107.170	172.473	Arch Canyon Campgrounds	
San Juan		110.768	178.264	Indian Ruins	
San Juan		115.001	185.076	Manti-La Sal National Forest Access	
San Juan		121.351	195.296	US 191 – Blanding, Bluff	
1.000 mi = 1.609 km; 1.000 km = 0.621 mi
