= Hite, Utah =

Hite
- Ranger District
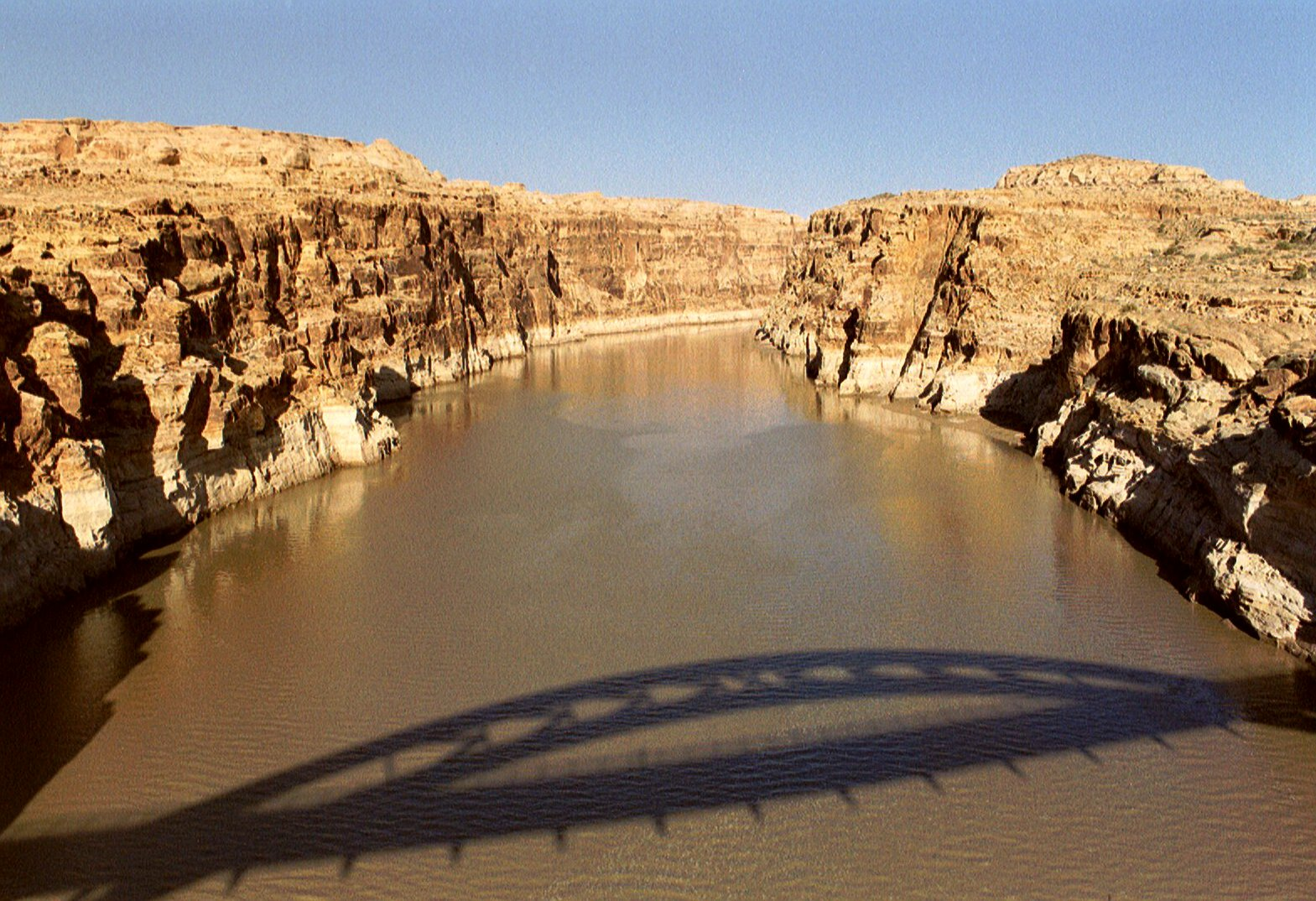
- Shadow of the Hite Crossing Bridge, almost 5 miles from where Hite is submerged by Lake Powell.

- Location within Utah Location within the United States
- Coordinates: 37°48′27″N 110°26′23″W
- Country: United States
- State: Utah
- County: San Juan
- Established: 1881
- Named for: Cass Hite
- Elevation: 3,704 ft (1,129 m)
- GNIS feature ID: 1455095

Historic Hite is a flooded ghost town at the north end of Lake Powell along the Colorado River in western San Juan County, Utah, United States. Lake Powell and all of its other points of interest are in the Glen Canyon National Recreation Area, managed by the National Park Service and available to the public for recreation. The town existed on land that Lake Powell now covers.

Hite was named for Cass Hite, an early settler. The name was transferred to a National Park Recreation Area at the north end of Lake Powell. The Hite Crossing Bridge, near the marina, carries Utah State Route 95 over the Colorado River and connects the area to the north of the lake.

== Climate ==
According to the Köppen Climate Classification system, Hite has a semi-arid climate, abbreviated "BSk" on climate maps.

== See also ==
- List of ghost towns in Utah
