= Bullfrog Basin =

- recreation site
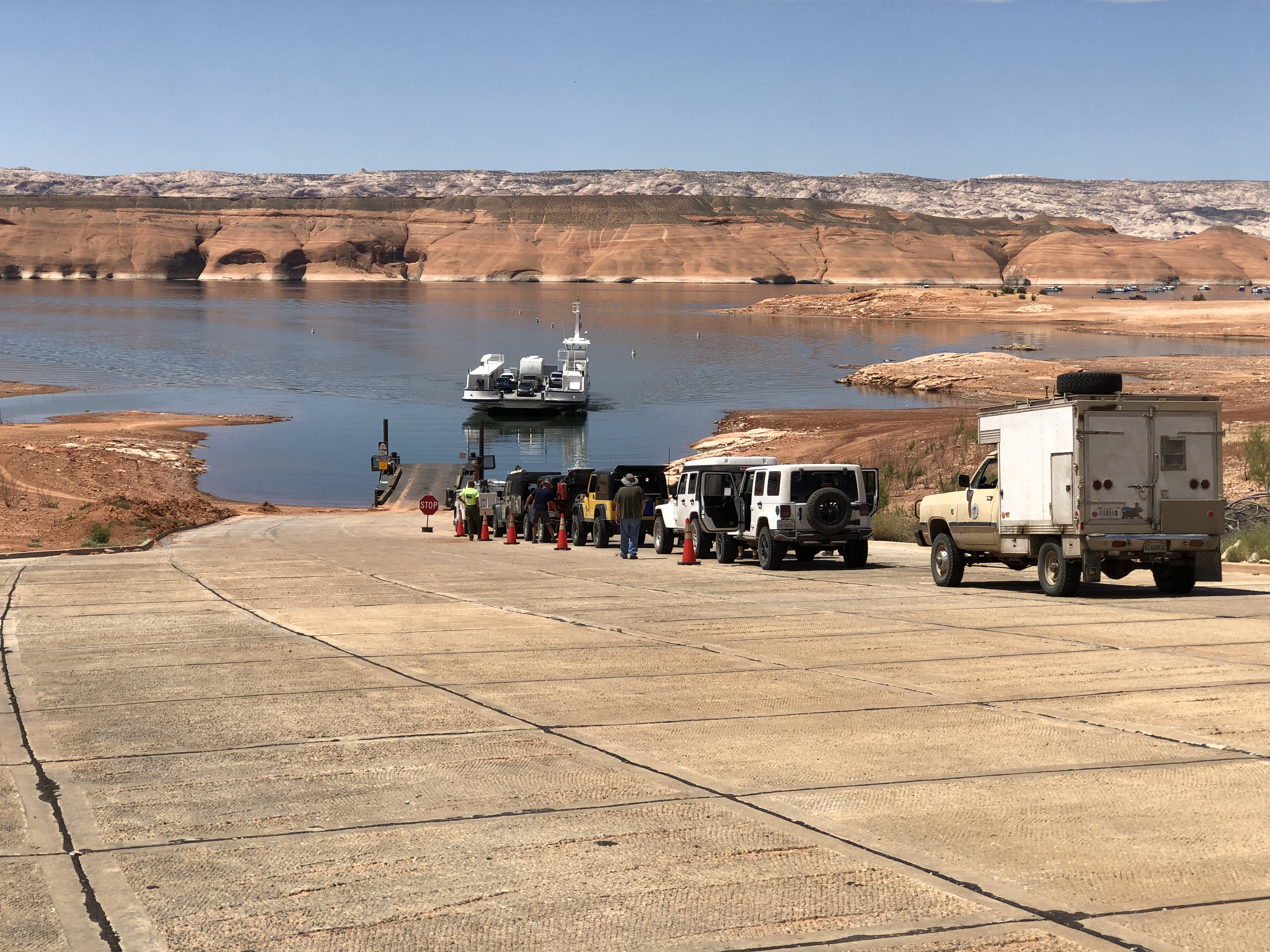
- The Charles Hall Ferry pulling in to the Bullfrog terminus

- Location within the state of Utah
- Coordinates: 37°30′58″N 110°43′43″W
- Country: United States
- State: Utah
- County: Kane
- Time zone: UTC-7 (Mountain (MST))
  - Summer (DST): UTC-6 (MDT)
- ZIP codes: 84533
- Area code: 435
- GNIS feature ID: 1435217

Bullfrog Basin Airport
- IATA: BFG; ICAO: none; FAA LID: U07

Summary
- Airport type: Public
- Owner: U.S. National Park Service
- Serves: Glen Canyon National Recreation Area, Utah
- Elevation AMSL: 4,167 ft (1,270 m)
- Coordinates: 37°32′45″N 110°42′48″W
- Interactive map of Bullfrog Basin Airport

Runways
| Direction | Length | | Surface |
| Direction | ft | m | Surface |
|---|---|---|---|
| 1/19 | 3,500 | 1,067 | Asphalt |

Statistics (2023)
- Aircraft operations (year ending 9/30/2023): 2,502
- Source: Federal Aviation Administration

Bullfrog Basin is one of the National Park Service recreation sites of the Glen Canyon National Recreation Area of Kane County, Utah, United States, adjoining Lake Powell. It encompasses Bullfrog Basin Airport (IATA: BFG, ICAO: U07, FAA LID: U07), the Bullfrog Resort and Marina, the Bullfrog terminus of the Charles Hall Ferry, and a campground.

It is nearby the 1970s mining town Ticaboo. The National Park Lodge in the site is named Defiance House Lodge. Built on a bluff that overlooks the Bullfrog Bay part of Lake Powell, it is a stucco building with several adjoining prefabricated units. Bullfrog Basin has a USNPS visitor centre, and the Bullfrog Resort and Marina includes a restaurant, shops, and a gas station.

Its development was personally championed by Calvin Rampton in the 1960s, who secured a US$2.7 million funds-matching grant from the Economic Development Administration in 1966 to pave an access road to the area. Although the road did not connect to a settlement at either end, the USNPS had already spent US$1.5 million on clearing the area for the aforementioned airport, marina, and campground; along with a planned restaurant, boat ramp, motel, and visitor centre.

The Lake Powell Parkway, originally planned as part of the USNPS Mission 66 (a.k.a. the Grand Circle) road system, would have joined Bullfrog to US-89 near Page, Arizona in one direction and to I-70 near Moab, Utah in the other, and would have significantly increased access to Bullfrog. However, it met with significant opposition in the 1970s, with campaigners preferring the Canyon Country Parkway instead, and the much cheaper idea of paving an existing dirt road between Bullfrog and the Burr Trail. This was highly favoured by the Garfield county commissioner Del LeFevre, and the title of the engineering study indicated the intention to increase tourism for Bullfrog: Boulder-Bullfrog Scenic Road: A Vital Link in the Grand Circle Adventure.

By 1979 the recreation area had a permanent resident population of 115: 40 Park Service employees and their families, 60 concessions workers and their families, and 15 state employees and their families. Employment of extra staff during the tourist season was raising this to some 200 people. Some of the population was living in 2 Park Service duplexes, and some in the 1 Utah state-owned duplex, but most were living in rented mobile homes. There was one school in one of the mobile homes, with a single teacher, although a second teacher and mobile home were planned given the contemporary expansion at Ticaboo, and no commercial power.

Hobie Cat Beach, a 15 acres (6.1 ha) beach near to the Bullfrog Marina, was (along with Lone Rock Beach near to Wahweap Marina to the southwest along the Colorado River) notorious in the 1990s for its Memorial Day parties, which one park ranger characterized at the time as a congregation of thousands of people between 16 and 25 who came "to drink beer, fornicate, and fight". Unable to effectively police Memorial Day in 1992, with officers outnumbered by an encircling crowd of youths when they attempted to arrest a suspected drug dealer, police presence was boosted in 1993, with a temporary local dedicated justice system erected in Bullfrog, comprising a courtroom, holding cells, judges, bail bondsmen, and bailiffs.

The drought at Lake Powell in the first decade of the 21st century caused the USNPS to significantly extend the boat ramp at Bullfrog Marina; so much so, in the words of James Lawrence Powell, Executive Director of the National Physical Science Consortium at the University of Southern California, that "had the ramp been level, a small plane could have landed on it".

The airport is owned by the National Park Service. It is located 5 miles (8 km) north of Bullfrog Marina and Lake Powell. There are no aircraft assigned or stationed here; it is for transient aircraft and visitors to Lake Powell and Glen Canyon National Recreation Area. It covers an area of 42 acres (17 ha) and contains one runway designated 1/19 with a 3,500 x 40 ft (1,067 x 12 m) asphalt surface. For the 12-month period ending September 30, 2023, the airport had 2,502 aircraft operations: 99% general aviation and 1% air taxi.

In 1990, given an estimate that 55% of the flights to and from the airport were simply flights to nearby Cal Black Memorial airport at Halls Crossing to refuel, Bullfrog Basin having no refuelling facilities of its own, the FAA raised the possibility of closing the airstrip at Bullfrog Basin entirely, reducing flights by a projected 23% and reducing aircraft noise. Other options considered but rejected were closing both airports, or closing the Halls Crossing airport and leaving the Bullfrog Basin one open. The airport remained open, however, with 6690 total operations in 1999, down from a peak of 10800 total operations in 1991 (figures taken by the USFAA from the Utah Department of Aviation). A 1993 lawsuit had challenged the methodology used in the USFAA's 1990 Environmental Impact Statement, resulting in three requests for comments from interested parties by the USFAA in 1995, 1997, and 1998. In its revised report of 2000 the USFAA still raised the possibility of closure of Bullfrog Basin airport by 2008, but considered this to be the pessimistic view and recorded that the Utah Department of Transport had told it of no such closure plans.

== Climate ==
Climate data for Bullfrog Basin 1991-2020, extremes 1967-
| Month | Jan | Feb | Mar | Apr | May | Jun | Jul | Aug | Sep | Oct | Nov | Dec | Year |
|---|---|---|---|---|---|---|---|---|---|---|---|---|---|
| Record high °F (°C) | 67 (19) | 76 (24) | 85 (29) | 94 (34) | 102 (39) | 111 (44) | 114 (46) | 108 (42) | 106 (41) | 94 (34) | 81 (27) | 71 (22) | 114 (46) |
| Mean daily maximum °F (°C) | 46.3 (7.9) | 52.8 (11.6) | 63.3 (17.4) | 71.7 (22.1) | 81.8 (27.7) | 94.0 (34.4) | 99.6 (37.6) | 96.6 (35.9) | 87.9 (31.1) | 73.5 (23.1) | 58.3 (14.6) | 46.1 (7.8) | 72.7 (22.6) |
| Mean daily minimum °F (°C) | 26.0 (−3.3) | 29.6 (−1.3) | 36.4 (2.4) | 43.7 (6.5) | 53.4 (11.9) | 64.0 (17.8) | 71.4 (21.9) | 68.5 (20.3) | 59.5 (15.3) | 46.0 (7.8) | 34.0 (1.1) | 25.6 (−3.6) | 46.5 (8.1) |
| Record low °F (°C) | 3 (−16) | 4 (−16) | 15 (−9) | 21 (−6) | 33 (1) | 42 (6) | 54 (12) | 46 (8) | 43 (6) | 22 (−6) | 13 (−11) | 0 (−18) | 0 (−18) |
| Average precipitation inches (mm) | 0.63 (16) | 0.53 (13) | 0.65 (17) | 0.34 (8.6) | 0.44 (11) | 0.15 (3.8) | 0.59 (15) | 0.54 (14) | 0.81 (21) | 0.81 (21) | 0.53 (13) | 0.42 (11) | 6.44 (164.4) |
| Average snowfall inches (cm) | 0.9 (2.3) | 0.8 (2.0) | 0.3 (0.76) | 0 (0) | 0 (0) | 0 (0) | 0 (0) | 0 (0) | 0 (0) | 0 (0) | 0.2 (0.51) | 1.8 (4.6) | 4.0 (10) |
| Average precipitation days (≥ 0.01 in) | 4.2 | 4.0 | 4.1 | 3.0 | 2.7 | 1.3 | 3.0 | 4.0 | 3.9 | 3.6 | 2.6 | 3.7 | 40.1 |
| Average snowy days (≥ 0.1 in) | 0.5 | 0.6 | 0.2 | 0 | 0 | 0 | 0 | 0 | 0 | 0 | 0.1 | 1.1 | 2.5 |
Source: NOAA

== See also ==
- List of airports in Utah
