= Hite Crossing Bridge =

Bridge in Utah, US

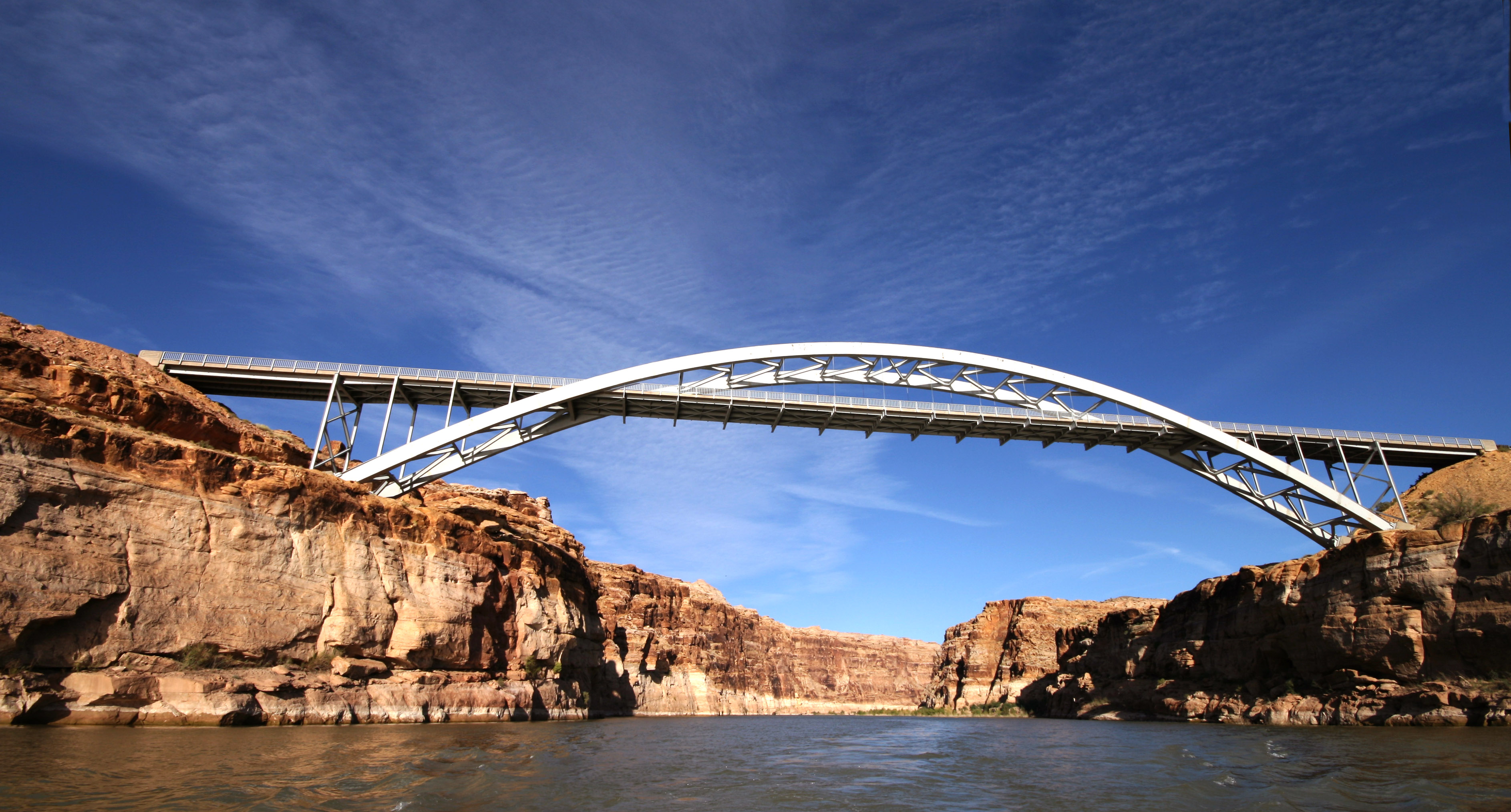
- Coordinates: 37°53′28″N 110°22′14″W
- Carries: SR-95
- Crosses: Colorado River / Lake Powell
- Locale: Glen Canyon National Recreation Area, Garfield / San Juan counties, Utah, USA
- Maintained by: Utah Department of Transportation

Characteristics
- Design: Arch
- Width: 2 lanes
- Clearance below: Approximately 200 ft (61 m) (varies by lake level)

History
- Construction cost: $3 million (equivalent to $22 million in 2024 dollars)
- Opened: June 3, 1966

Location
- Interactive map of Hite Crossing Bridge

The Hite Crossing Bridge is an arch bridge that carries Utah State Route 95 across the Colorado River northwest of Blanding, Utah, United States. The bridge informally marks the upstream limit of Lake Powell and the end of Cataract Canyon of the Colorado River, but when the lake is at normal water elevation, the water can back up over 30 miles (48 km) upstream into Cataract Canyon. The bridge is the only automobile bridge spanning the Colorado River between the Glen Canyon Bridge, 185 miles (298 km) downstream near the Glen Canyon Dam and the U.S. Route 191 bridge 110 miles (180 km) upstream near Moab. The bridge is near Hite Marina on Lake Powell, and a small airstrip is immediately adjacent to the north side of the bridge. The American Discovery Trail uses the bridge to cross the Colorado.

== History ==
The Colorado River served as a major barrier to early settlers and explorers of the region. In 1880 a prospector named Cass Hite established a ford near the mouth of the Dirty Devil River, 2 miles (3.2 km) downstream from the present-day bridge location. This ford, named "Dandy Crossing", served as one of the few locations in the region where travelers could cross the Colorado River. The settlement that formed at the crossing location took the name of its founder, Hite. In 1946, a settler named Arthur Chaffin constructed an automobile ferry using an old car engine and a thick steel cable to hold it in place. The ferry operated for 20 years, before the rising waters of Lake Powell inundated the settlement of Hite.

The bridge was completed as part of the realignment of State Route 95, which was approved in 1962 due to the construction of Glen Canyon Dam and Lake Powell's subsequent flooding of the original roadway alignment and the original river crossing in Hite. The bridge was designed by David Sargent and was advertised for bids on June 29, 1963 at a cost of approximately US$3 million (equivalent to $23 million in 2024 dollars). The bridge was dedicated on June 3, 1966.
