= Glen Canyon National Recreation Area =

Protected area in Arizona and Utah, US

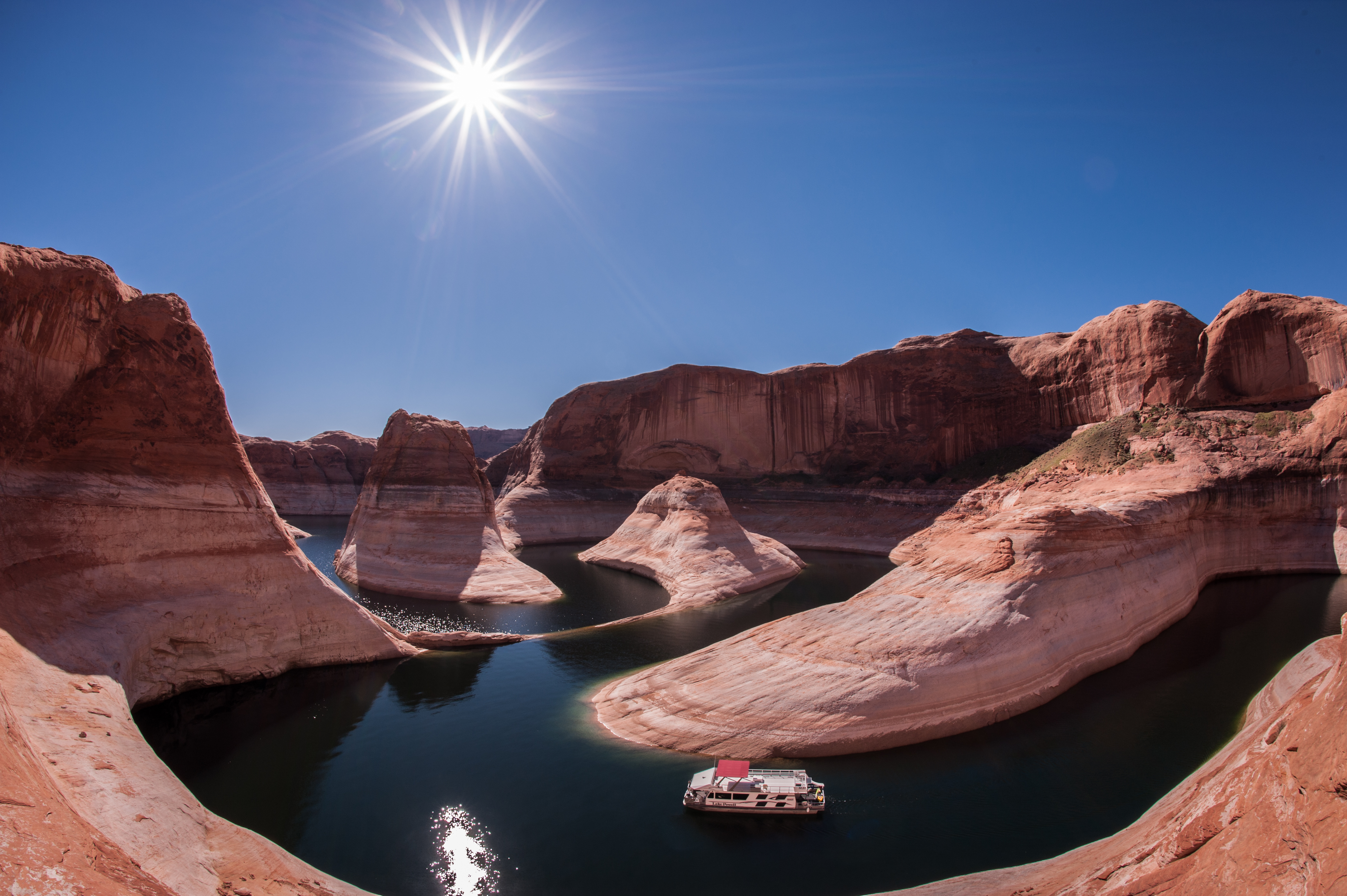
- Reflection Canyon
- Interactive map of Glen Canyon National Recreation Area
- Location: Kane, San Juan, Garfield, and Wayne counties in Utah; and Coconino County in Arizona, United States
- Nearest city: Page, Arizona; Bullfrog, Utah
- Coordinates: 36°59′37″N 111°29′13″W
- Area: 1,254,117 acres (5,075.23 km^{2})
- Established: October 27, 1972
- Visitors: 5,206,934 (in 2023)
- Governing body: National Park Service, Bureau of Reclamation
- Website: Glen Canyon National Recreation Area

Glen Canyon National Recreation Area (shortened to Glen Canyon NRA or GCNRA) is a national recreation area and conservation unit of the United States National Park Service that encompasses the area around Lake Powell and lower Cataract Canyon in Utah and Arizona, covering 1,254,429 acres (5,076.49 km^{2}) of mostly rugged high desert terrain. The recreation area is named for Glen Canyon, which was flooded by the Glen Canyon Dam, completed in 1966, and is now mostly submerged beneath the waters of Lake Powell.

Glen Canyon NRA borders Capitol Reef National Park and Canyonlands National Park on the north, Grand Staircase–Escalante National Monument on the west, Vermilion Cliffs National Monument and the northeasternmost reaches of Grand Canyon National Park on the southwest, and the Navajo Nation on the southeast. The southwestern end of Glen Canyon NRA in Arizona can be accessed via U.S. Route 89 and State Route 98. State Route 95 and State Route 276 lead to the northeastern end of the recreation area in Utah.

Glen Canyon NRA was established "to provide for public use and enjoyment and to preserve the area's scientific, historic, and scenic features." The stated purpose of Glen Canyon NRA is for recreation as well as preservation (whereas a national park may carry more emphasis on natural preservation). As such, the area has been developed for access to Lake Powell via five marinas, four public campgrounds, two small airports, and numerous houseboat rental concessions.

== Administrative History ==
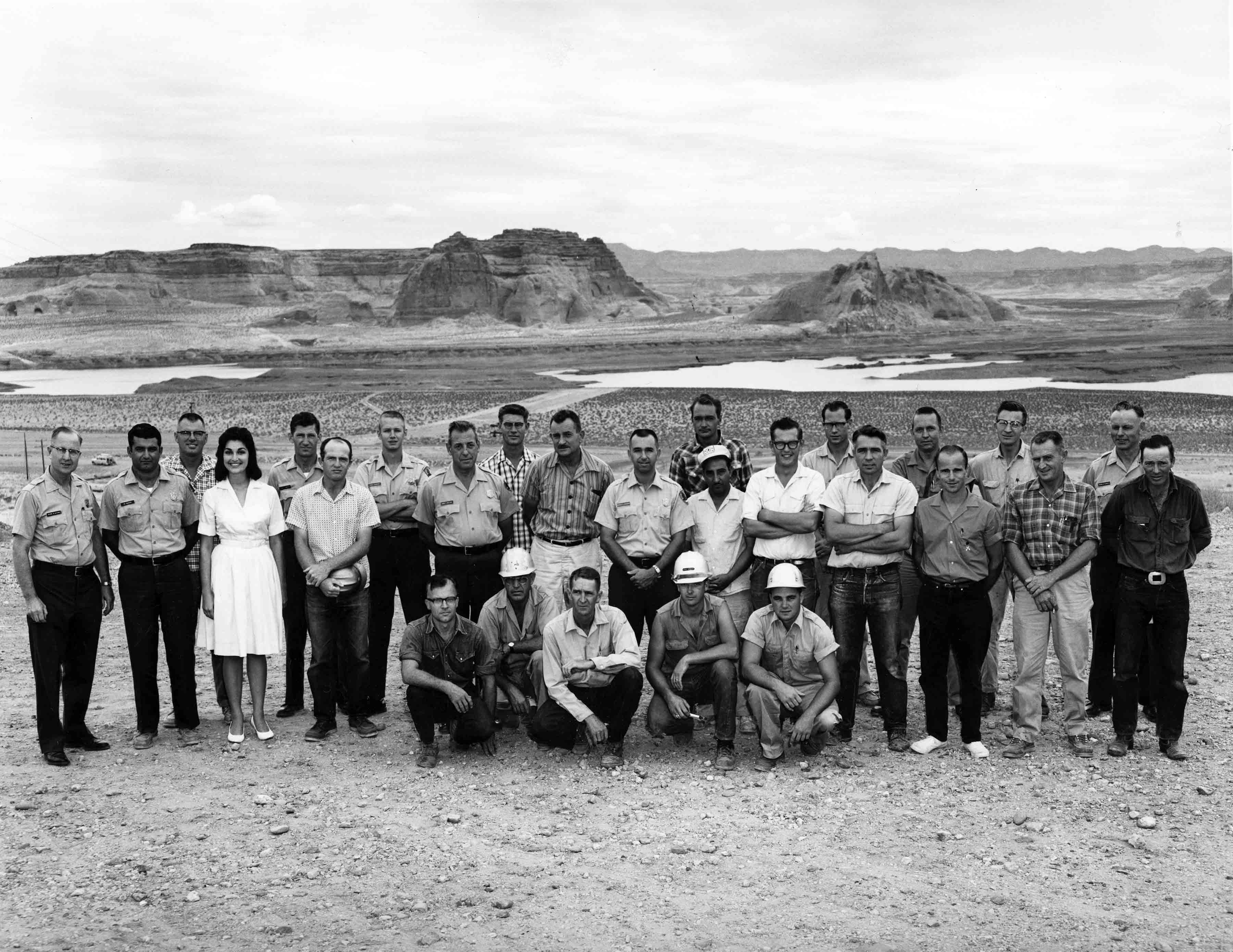
National Park Service Glen Canyon National Recreation Area Staff 1964. Kneeling Front Row (left to right): Clarence Smith, Vaughn Gray, Don Riggs, Byron Baughman, Dick Snow Standing Front Row (left to right): Wayne Alcorn, Ed Mazzer, Donna Bloxton, Seymour Parkes, John Mullady, Jim Eden, Don Jackson, Bennie Garcia, Elmer Solomon, Keith Wilkins, Carl Krigbaum, Wayne Corbit, Cloyd Chalk Standing Back Row (left to right): Wilmer Salmon, Lyle Jamison, Chris Cameron, Gary Bierhaus, Adrian Kitchen, Marion Clark, Neaf Swapp, Tom Brewster, and Marion Thurston. The view is looking north toward Wahweap Bay. The water is from the reservoir filling behind the newly completed Glen Canyon Dam.

In February 1957 Utah senator Arthur V. Watkins requested Secretary of the Interior Fred A. Seaton study the possibility of a national recreation area at the reservoir formed by Glen Canyon Dam. In June 1958, the National Park Service and the Bureau of Reclamation agreed on administration and development of the upstream and downstream areas of the Colorado River either side of Glen Canyon Dam. The area, according to Secretary Seaton, would be designated the Glen Canyon National Recreation Area.

In January 1959, President Dwight D. Eisenhower proposed a budget that included $43,500 for the construction of roads in Glen Canyon NRA. That March, the National Park Service announced plans for GCNRA including the expenditure of $16.5 million over the next 10 to 15 years. In April 1959, a Department of Interior source stated James Milford Eden, Superintendent of Organ Pipe Cactus National Monument, would be named the first Superintendent of GCNRA. That May, Eden set up office in a trailer near what would become today’s Wahweap Marina. That October, the National Parks Advisory Board toured Glen Canyon Dam. Superintendent Eden was on the tour, accompanied by Frank Masland Jr., Chairman of the Advisory Board.

In March 1960, Eden presented a map of the tentative boundaries of GCNRA, including the road to Lees Ferry from Highway 89 and lands just west and south of the northwest side of Navajo Bridge. On June 1, 1960, GCNRA received a used WWII 24-ton LCM Landing Craft Mechanized from the U.S. Navy. It was the second boat the new Recreation area had, the first was a “trim little boat” called the Park Ranger. The Park Service opened the campground at Wahweap Marina on December 6, 1961. It had 57 camping sites. In July 1962, GCNRA let out bids for construction of NPS housing in Page, Arizona, and at Wahweap Marina.

In September 1962, the US Senate Public Works Commission authorized $3,000,000 for a bridge to cross the Colorado River just upstream from the confluence with the Dirty Devil River. That November, GCNRA let bids to operate a concessions contract for the operation of a marina near the bridge called Hite Marina. Recreation facilities at Lees Ferry were also planned. In August 1963, Utah senator Frank Moss introduced legislation to create Glen Canyon National Recreation Area. The area in Moss’s Bill encompassed 1,430,000 acres of land and intended to establish by law the recreation area designated by the Interior Order of 1958. The final bill passed by Congress, Public Law 92-593, was for 1,236,880 acres and was signed into law by President Richard Nixon on October 27, 1972.

== Geology ==
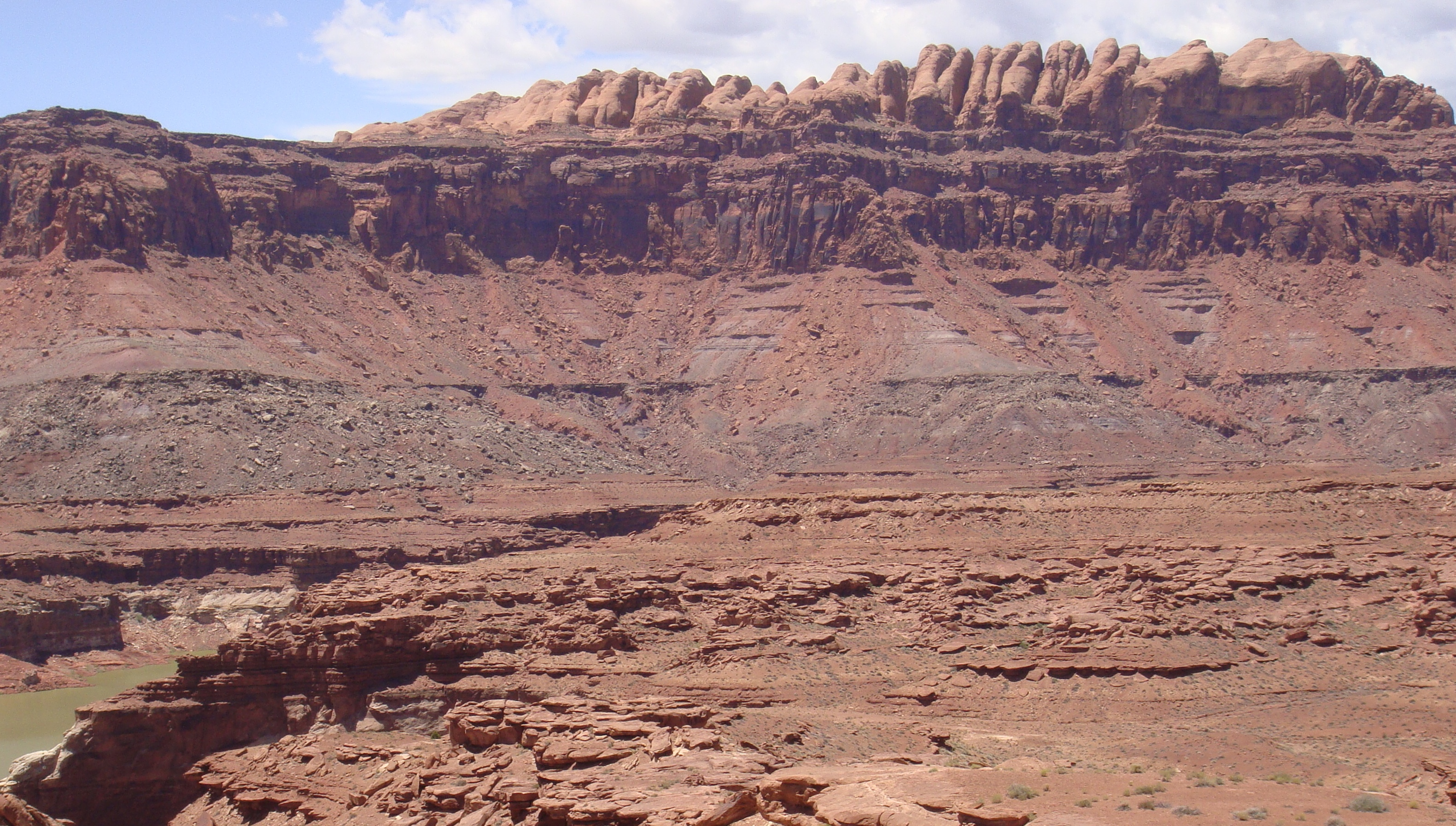
The Permian through Jurassic stratigraphy of the Colorado Plateau area of southeastern Utah that makes up much of the famous prominent rock formations in protected areas such as Capitol Reef National Park and Canyonlands National Park. From top to bottom: Rounded tan domes of the Navajo Sandstone; layered red Kayenta Formation; cliff-forming, vertically jointed, red Wingate Sandstone; slope-forming, purplish Chinle Formation; layered, lighter-red Moenkopi Formation; and white, layered Cutler Formation sandstone. Picture from Glen Canyon National Recreation Area, Utah.

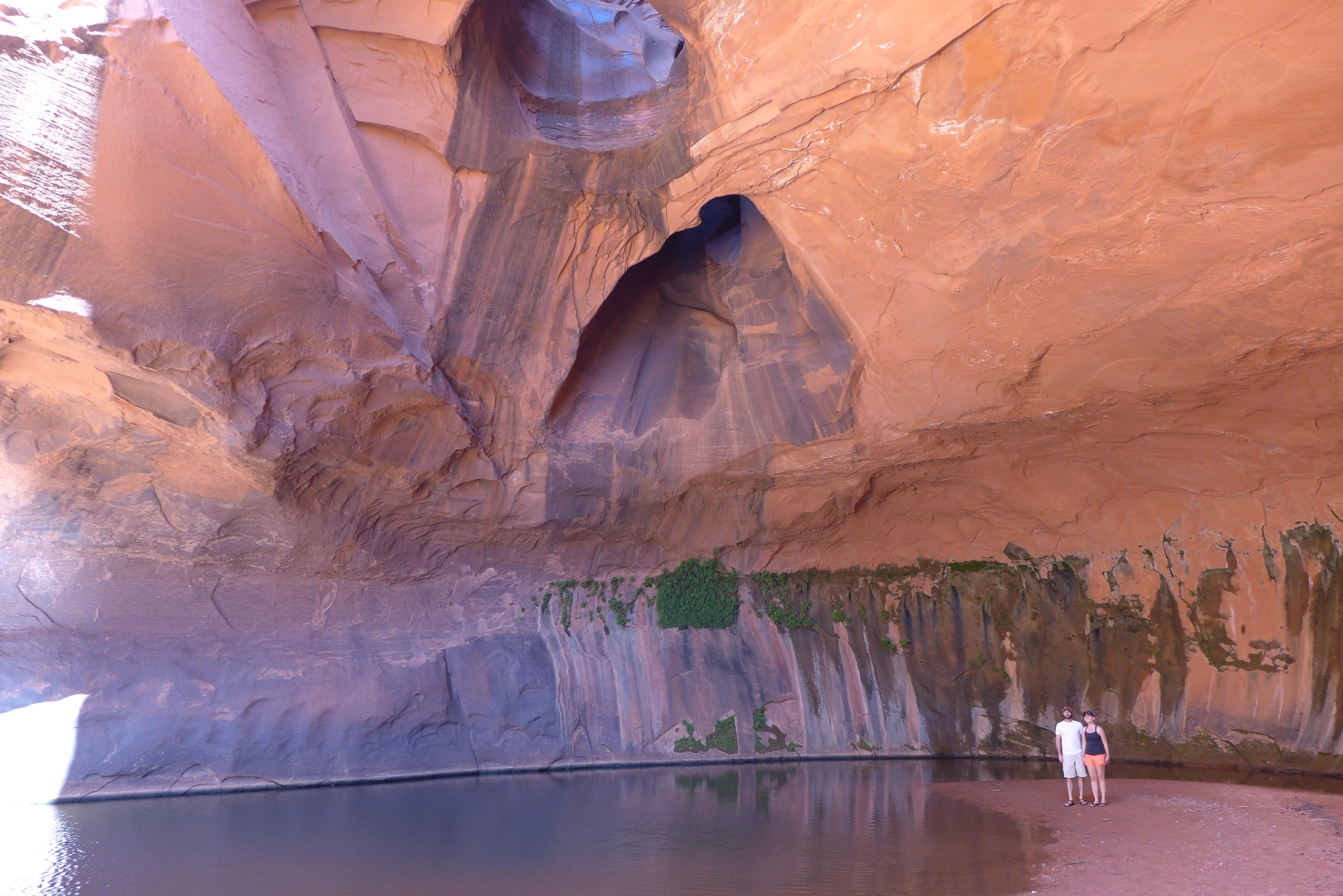
Golden Cathedral

The geology of the area is dominated by the Glen Canyon Group, consisting of the Navajo Sandstone, Kayenta Formation, and Wingate Sandstone. The entire stratigraphic section includes rocks dating from the Cretaceous to Pennsylvanian periods.

=== Double Arch ===
A well-known rock formation named the Double Arch existed over Lake Powell. It collapsed on August 8, 2024.

== Recreation ==
Lake Powell has nearly 2,000 miles (3,200 km) of fish-holding shoreline and provides opportunities to fish for largemouth bass, smallmouth bass, and striped bass that swim in the waters of the recreation area.

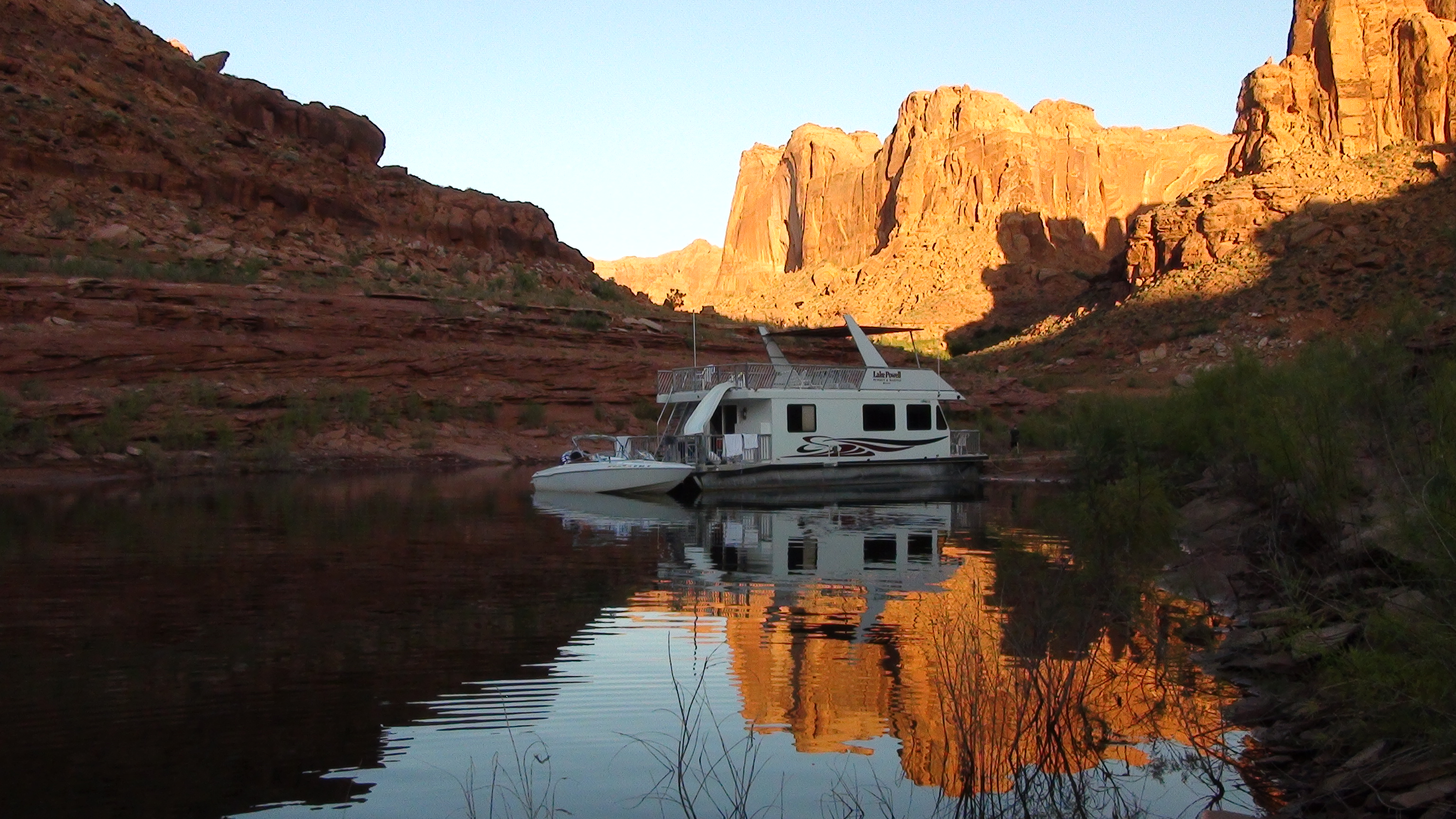
Houseboat and powerboat in Knowles Canyon on Lake Powell, Glen Canyon National Recreation Area, Utah

Several local marinas and sports outfitters provide houseboats, powerboats, jet skis, kayaks, fishing gear, and related equipment to visitors.

== Graffiti Removal and Intervention Team (GRIT) ==
With millions of visitors to the recreation area each year, it is inevitable that vandals will deface the rock faces of the canyon. Glen Canyon NRA has implemented a voluntourism program wherein volunteers sign up for a five-day houseboat trip during which they help remove graffiti from the canyon walls.

== See also ==
- Glen Canyon Institute
- Rainbow Bridge National Monument

Rainbow Bridge National Monument
