= Halls Crossing, Utah =

- CDP
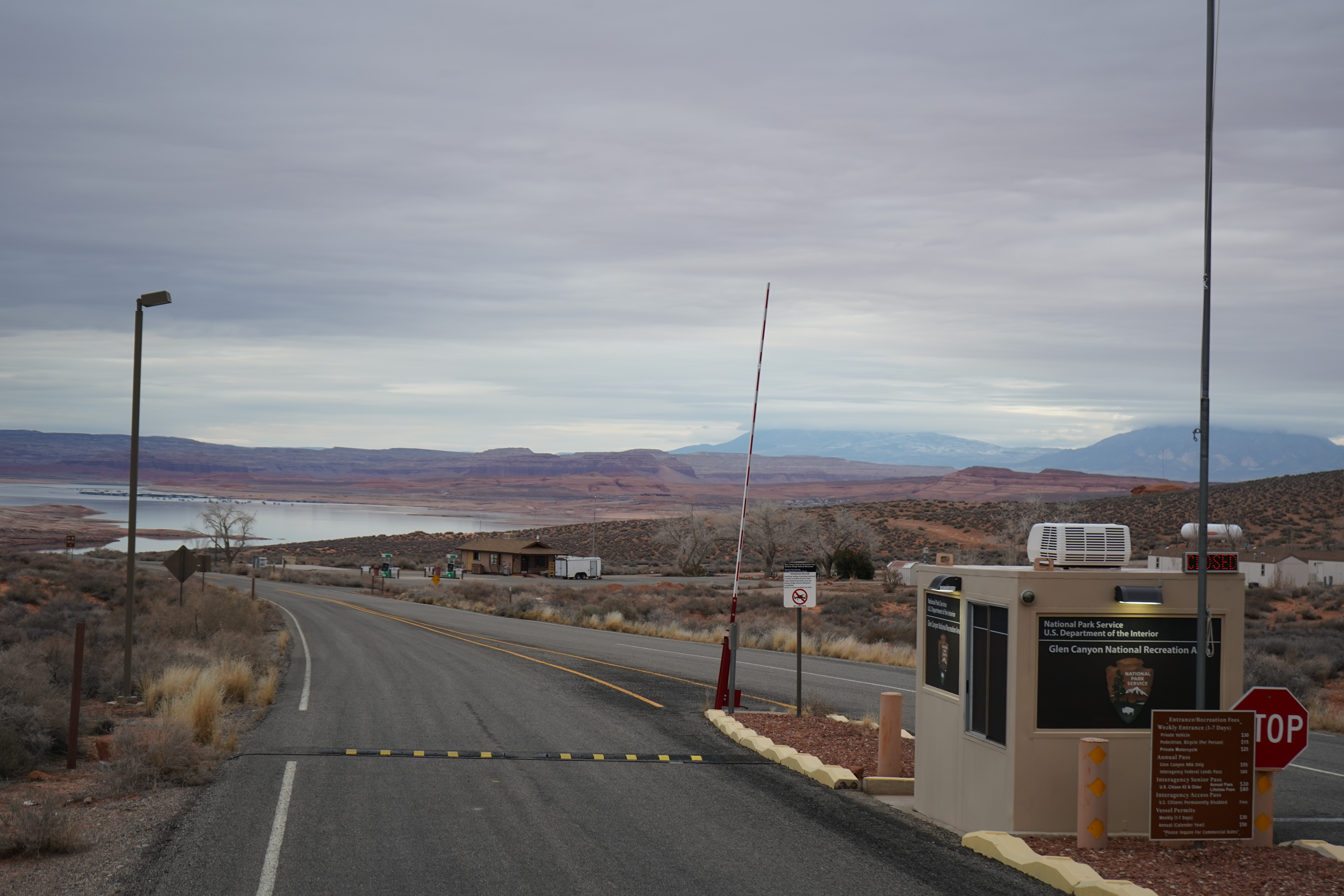
- Halls Crossing entrance toll booth for the Glen Canyon National Recreation Area

- Location in San Juan County and the state of Utah.
- Coordinates: 37°27′48″N 110°39′50″W
- Country: United States
- State: Utah
- County: San Juan

Area
  - Total: 17.5 sq mi (45.3 km^{2})
  - Land: 13.2 sq mi (34.2 km^{2})
  - Water: 4.3 sq mi (11.1 km^{2})
- Elevation: 3,921 ft (1,195 m)

Population (2020)
  - Total: 4
  - Density: 0.30/sq mi (0.12/km^{2})
- Time zone: UTC-7 (Mountain (MST))
  - Summer (DST): UTC-6 (MDT)
- ZIP code: 84533
- Area code: 435
- FIPS code: 49-33027
- GNIS feature ID: 2408346

Halls Crossing is a census-designated place (CDP) on the western edge of San Juan County, Utah, United States. As of the 2020 census, Halls Crossing had a population of 4. State Route 276 crosses the Colorado River at Halls Crossing using the Charles Hall Ferry.

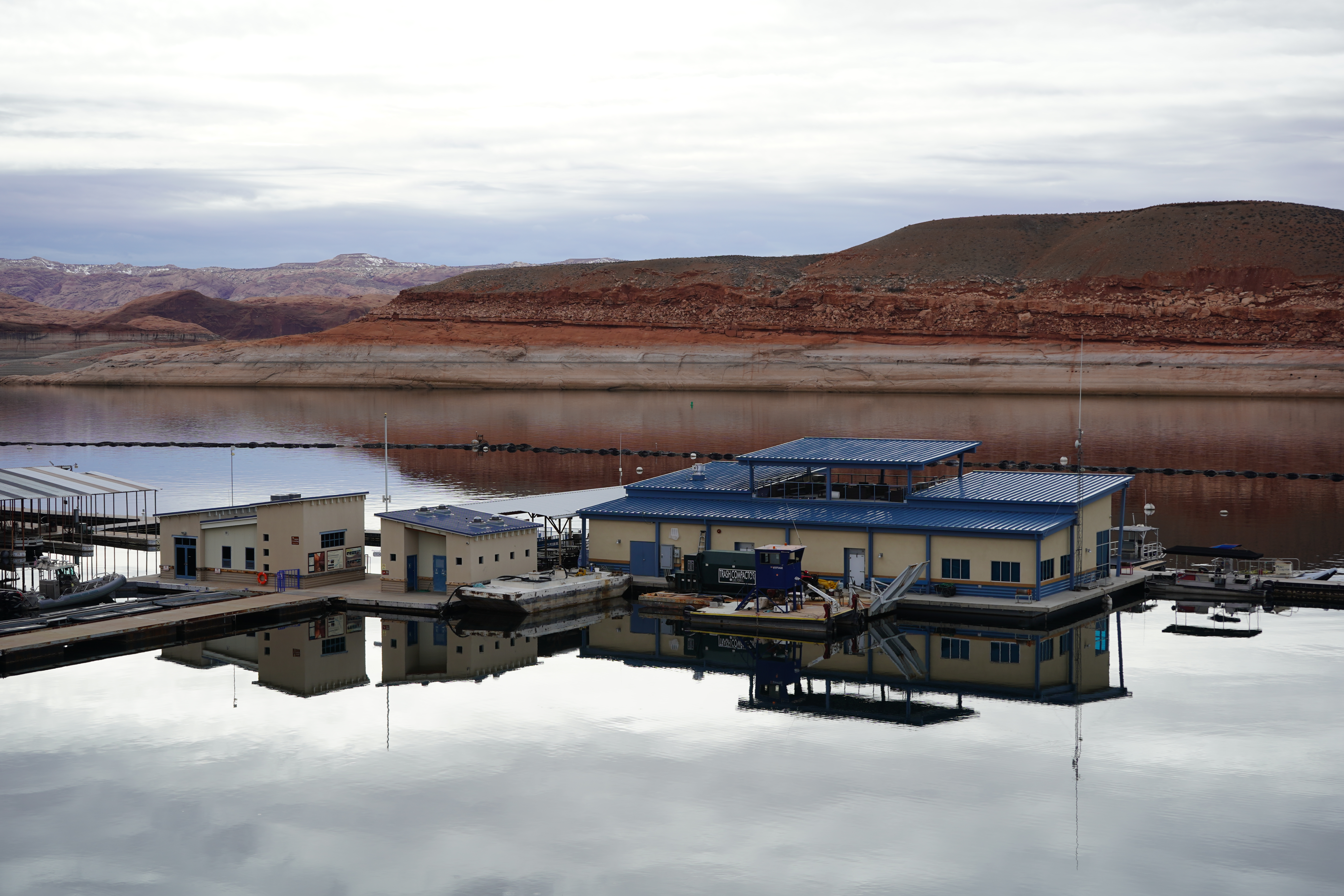
Halls Crossing Marina

== Geography ==
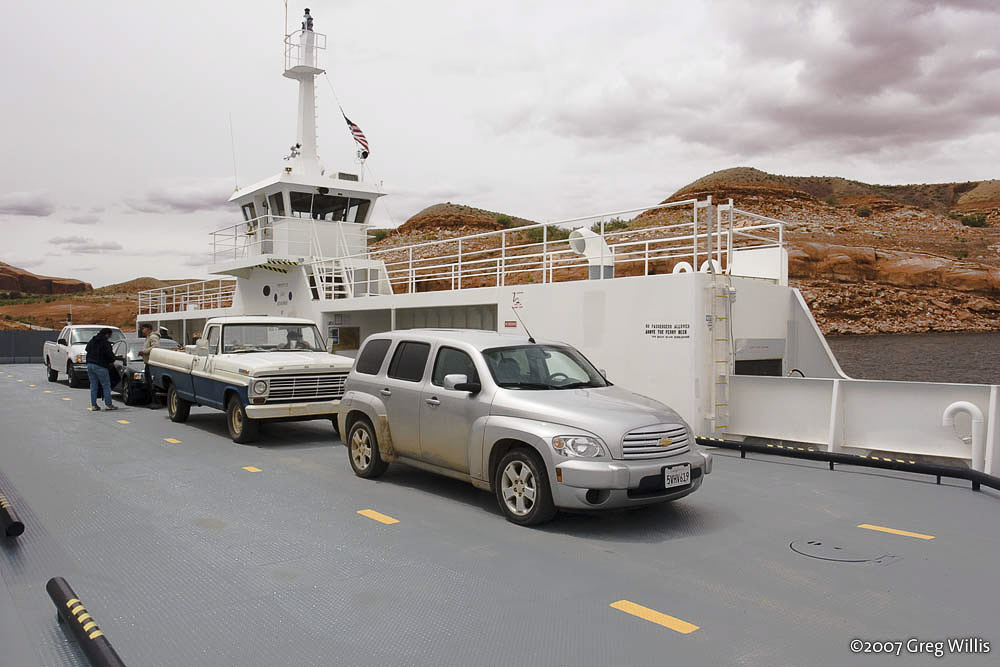
Bullfrog Ferry at Halls Crossing

According to the United States Census Bureau, the CDP has a total area of 17.5 square miles (45.2 km^{2}), of which 13.2 square miles (34.2 km^{2}) is land and 4.3 square miles (11.1 km^{2}) (24.50%) is water.

== Demographics ==
Historical population
Census	Pop.	Note	%±
2000	89		—
2010	6		−93.3%
2020	4		−33.3%

Only 8–10 people live here year-round. The rest, up to 40, are seasonal employees during the spring and summer months. Demographics depend on the seasonal employees.

As of the census of 2000, there were 89 people, 39 households, and 20 families residing in the CDP. The population density was 6.7 inhabitants per square mile (2.6/km^{2}). There were 58 housing units at an average density of 4.4 per square mile (1.7/km^{2}). The racial makeup of the CDP was 66% White, 28% Native American, 2% Asian, 3% from other races. Hispanic or Latino of any race were 3% of the population.

There were 8 households, out of which 20% had children under the age of 18 living with them, 20% were married couples living together, and 80% were non-families. 80% of all households were made up of individuals, and 0% had someone living alone who was 65 years of age or older. The average household size was 2.28 and the average family size was 2.90.

In the CDP, the population was spread out, with 19% under the age of 18, 25% from 18 to 24, 33% from 25 to 44, 23% from 45 to 64, and 0% who were 65 years of age or older. The median age was 30 years. For every 100 females, there were 196.7 males. For every 100 females age 18 and over, there were 188.0 males.

The median income for a household in the CDP was $26,635, and the median income for a family was $50,250. Males had a median income of $19,250 versus $20,625 for females. The per capita income for the CDP was $13,933. There were no families and 30% of the population living below the poverty line, including no under eighteens and none of those over 64.

== See also ==
- List of census-designated places in Utah
