= Moon House =

Pueblo cliff dwelling in Cedar Mesa, Utah, U.S.

Moon House (sometimes written as Moonhouse) is a Pueblo III-period cliff dwelling located in southeastern Utah on Cedar Mesa in Bears Ears National Monument. It was created by the Ancestral Puebloan peoples between 1150 and 1300.

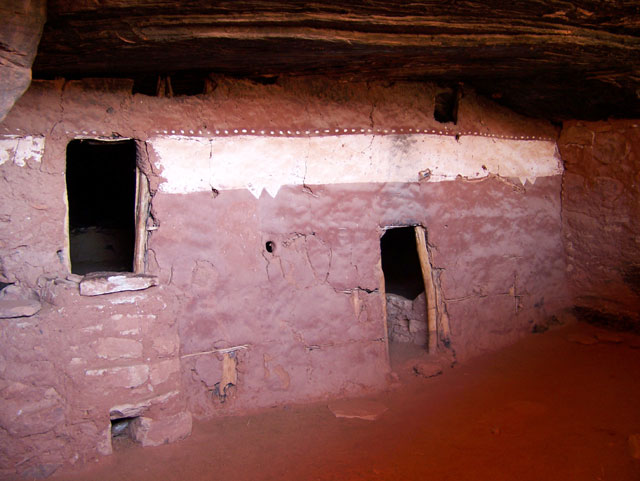
Interior view of Moon House showing some of the designs on the surfaces of the structures.

== Overview ==
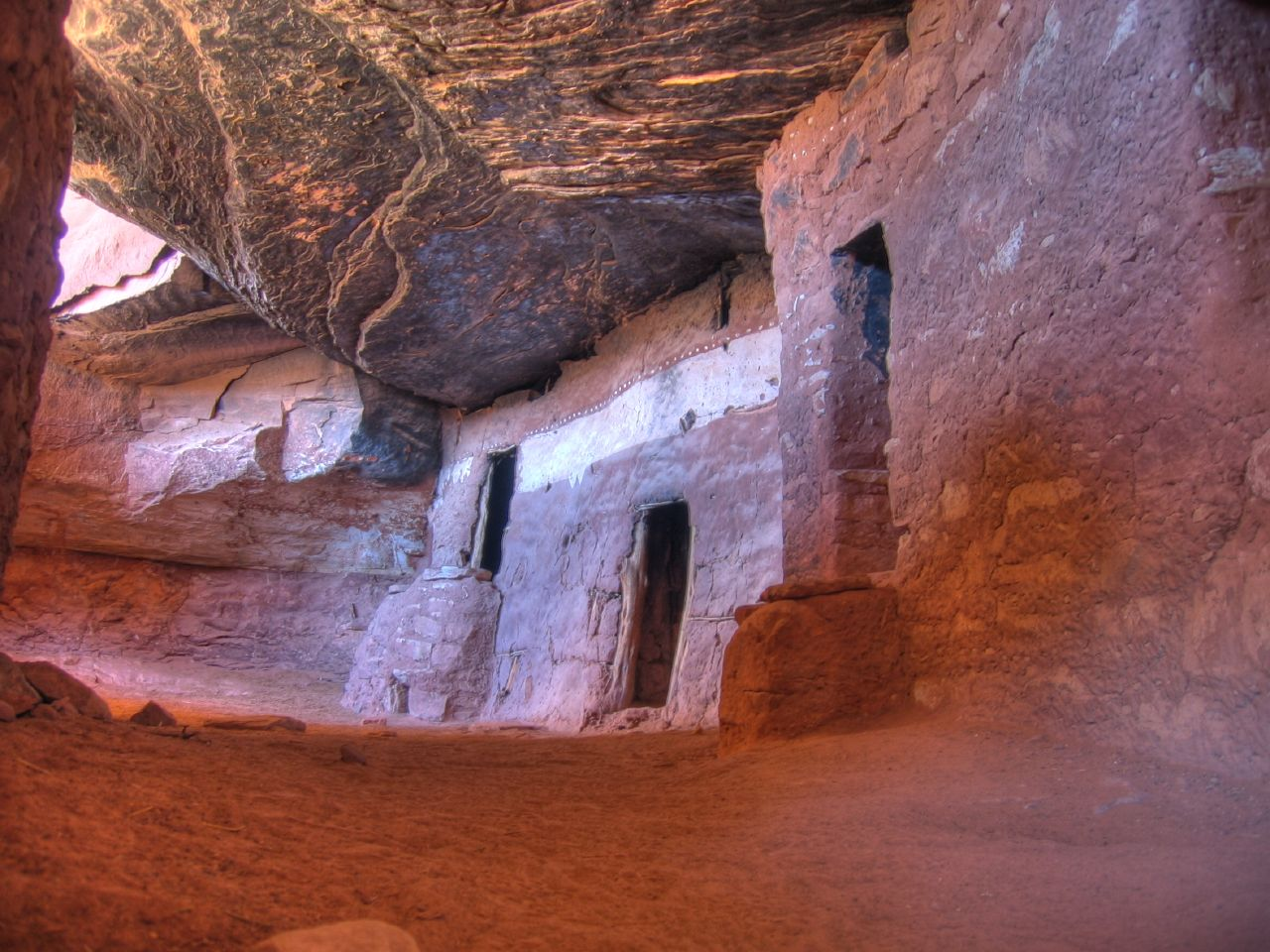
Masonry and jacal structure at Moon House, 2006

3 sections of the Moon House complex are identified by Bloomer (1989); M-1, M-2, and M-3. These are discussed briefly. Structures from the M-1 cluster yield tree-ring dates from between 964 and 1267, with most rooms clustering between 1125 and 1250. Structures from the M-2 cluster date from between 1109 and 1268. Structures in the M-3 cluster date from between 1044 and 1266, with most dates between 1150 and 1255.

Both Dean and Bloomer postulate different rooms served different functions, and each section of the Moon House complex had a different function. M-1 seems to represent a residential area, with approximately 5 households, while M-2 primarily functioned as a storage area and M-3 as a ceremonial unit dominated by a large kiva. Bloomer found no other kivas within the canyon where Moon House is located, indicating that perhaps Moon House served as a local ceremonial center, servicing the ceremonial needs of the residents nearby in the canyon as well as possibly from the mesa tops.

Moon House derives its name from the unique pictographs located within Room I within the M-1 cluster.

== Controversy ==
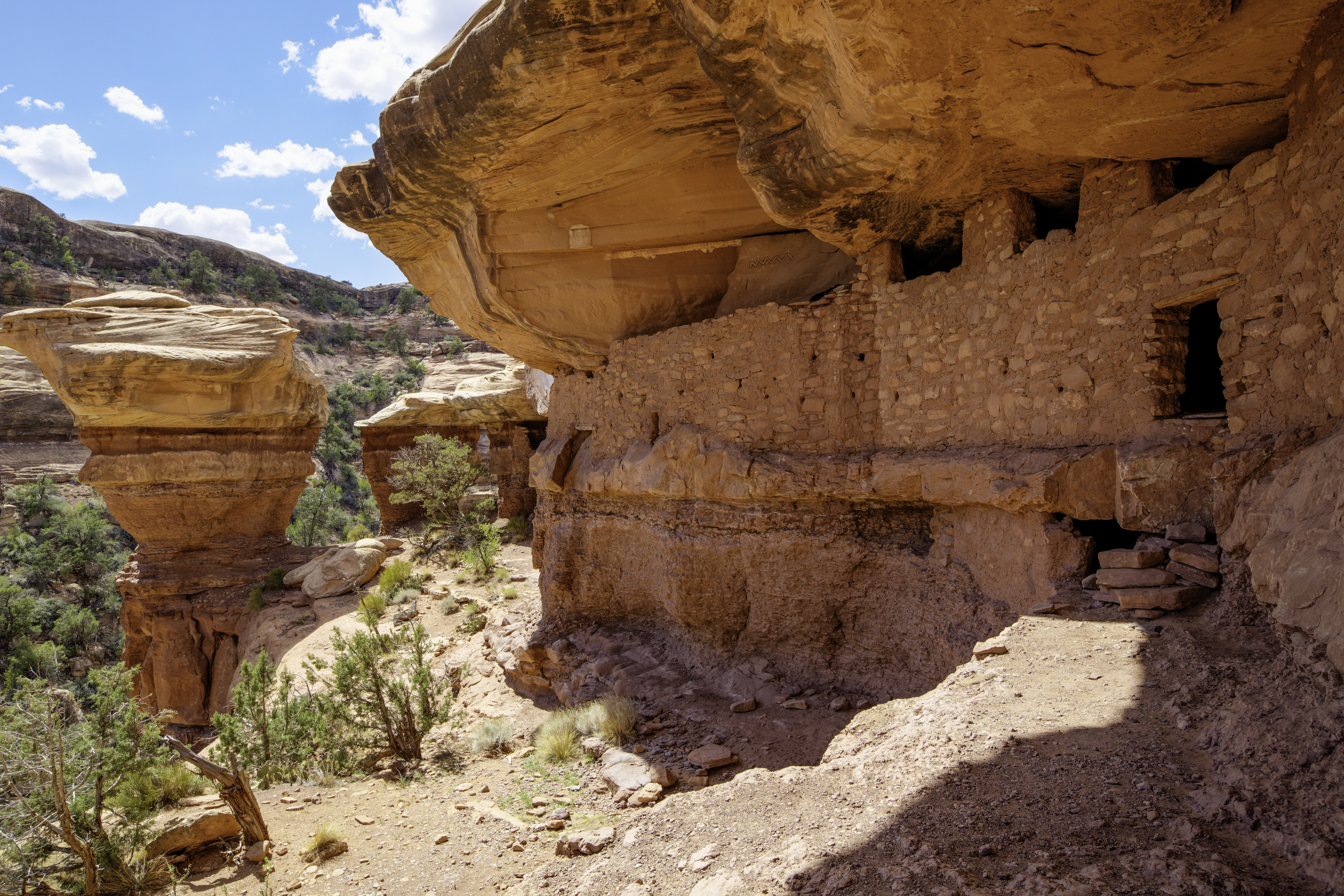
Outside view of the Moon House structure.

In recent years, debate has arisen among hikers that visit the southwest over the location of Moon House. Some hikers have argued that its location, being on public land, should be available to the public. The Bureau of Land Management and some professional archaeologists disagree with this. In recent years, the USGS has removed Moon House, among other ancient ruins, from its 7.5 minute topographical maps.

In 2011, the BLM Monticello Field Office created the Moon House Recreation Management Zone, limiting visitation to 20 people per day (no pets). This is in response to the rising visitation to Moon House and resultant damage. The site was listed on the National Register of Historic Places in 2017.

== In popular culture ==
Moon House is featured in David Robert's 1996 book "In Search of the Old Ones."

A.G. Deiss sets a portion of her 2003 novel "The Sullivan Girls and the Mystery of Moonhouse" at Moon House. She also adds Butch Cassidy and the Wild Bunch into the history of Moon House, though there is no evidence that he actually visited the ruin.

Craig Childs talks briefly about Moon House in his 2007 book House of Rain.

The 2009 book "The Marauders" by Rob Gay centers around Moon House and the controversy surrounding publication of its location.
