= Cedar Mesa =

Plateau in southeastern Utah

Coordinates: 37.433°N 109.917°W

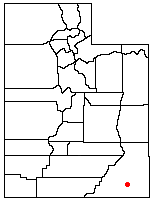
Location of Cedar Mesa in Utah

Cedar Mesa is a tableland in San Juan County in the southeastern portion of the U.S. state of Utah. It extends from Elk Ridge in the north, Comb Wash to the east, the gorge of the San Juan River to the south, and Grand Gulch to the west, an area of over 400 square miles (1,000 km^{2}). The center of the mesa is located at approximately 37°26'N and 109°55'W, at an elevation of 6,500 feet (2,000 m). The surrounding terrain has a typical elevation of just 4,200 feet (1,300 m) Most of Cedar Mesa is included in the newly declared (2016) Bears Ears National Monument.

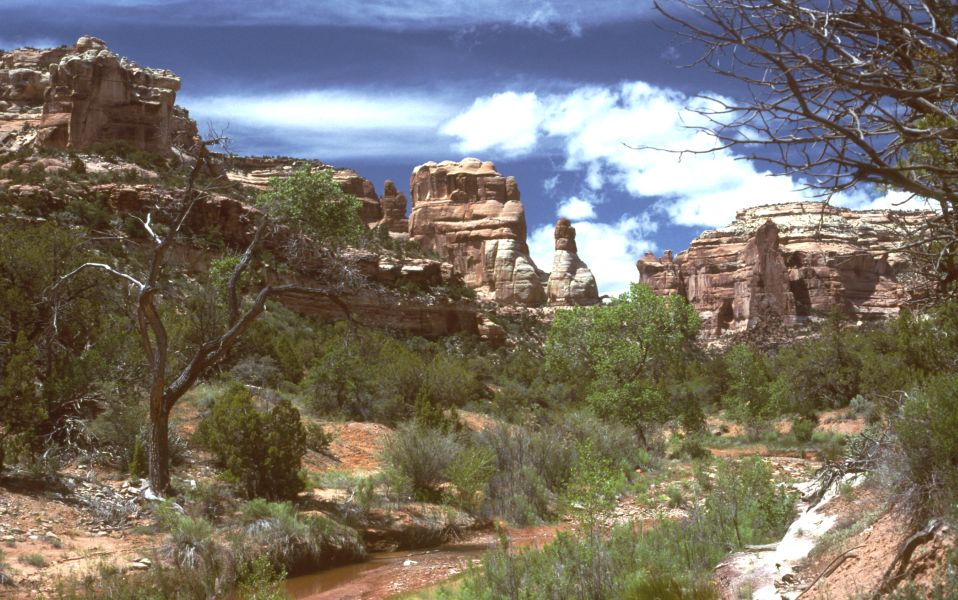
Arch Canyon, Utah

This large difference in elevation has led to the formation of numerous canyons, cliffs, and other erosional features on the edges of the mesa. To the east are several canyons draining into Comb Wash, including Arch, Texas, Mule, Owl, Fish, McCloyd, and Road Canyons. Scattered throughout these canyons are cliff dwellings of the Ancient Puebloans.

To the southeast is an eroded area called the Valley of the Gods, and to the southwest is a deep gorge of the San Juan River, called the Goosenecks. High above, on the southern edge of Cedar Mesa, are Muley and Cedar Points.

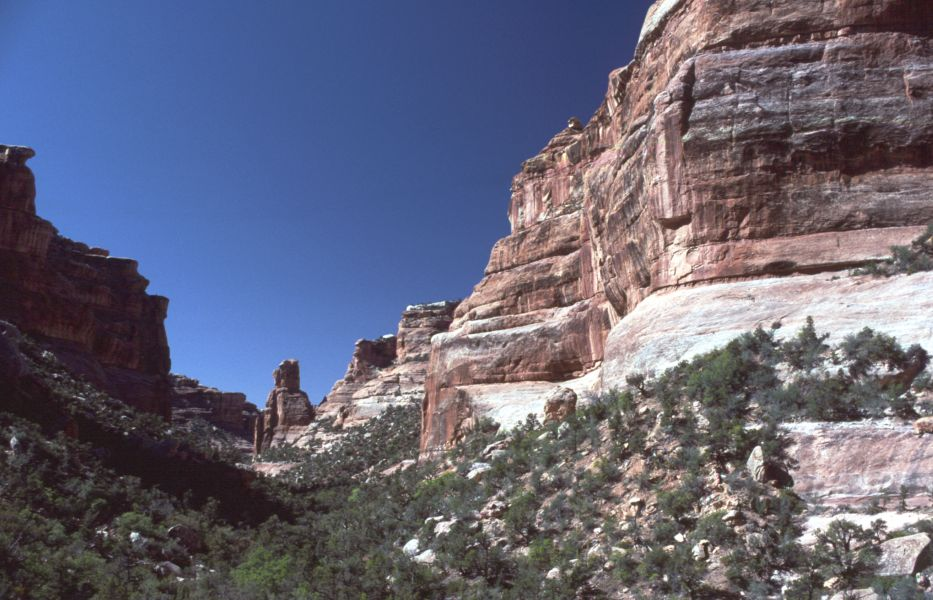
Slickhorn Canyon, Utah

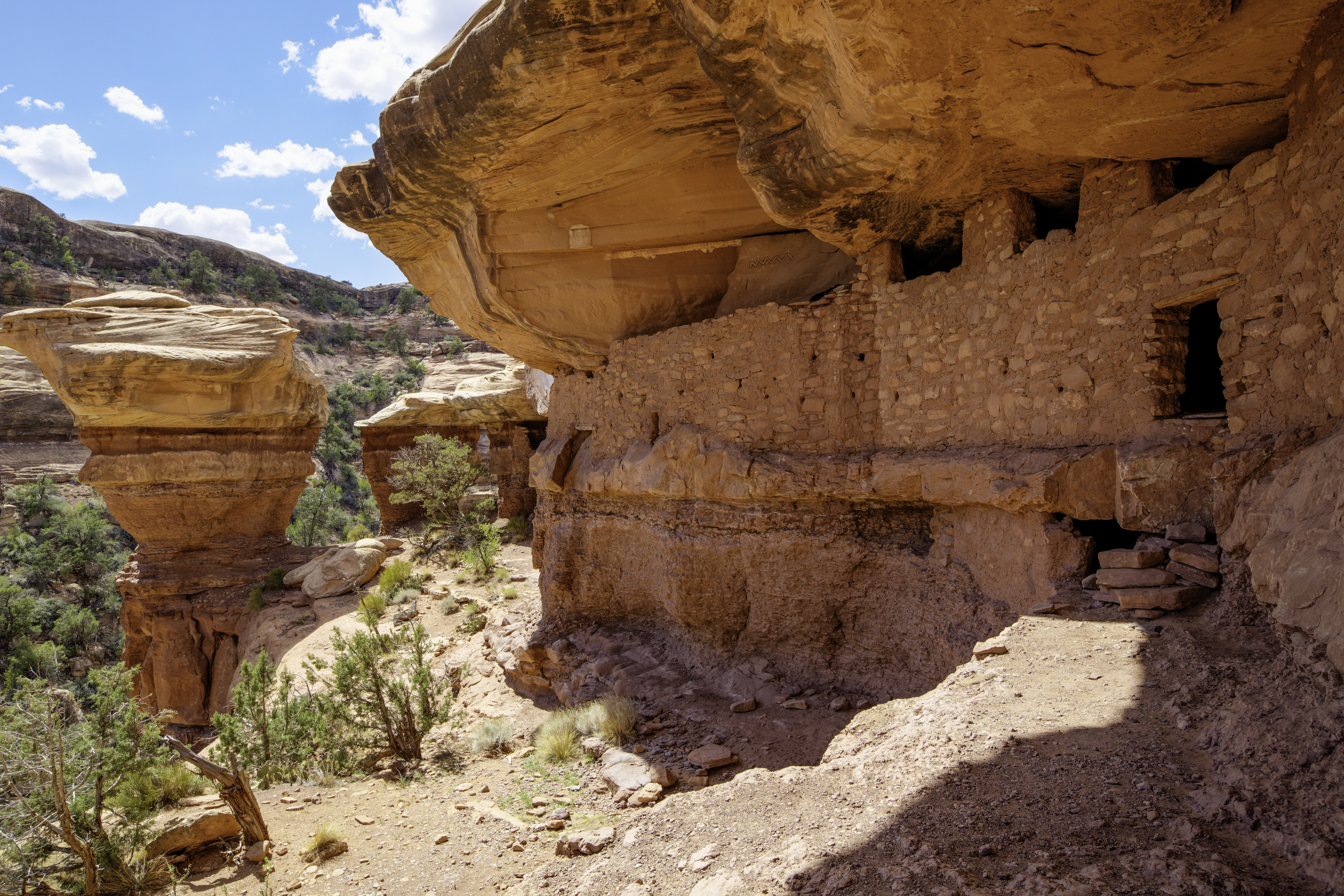
Moon House ruin, Cedar Mesa

The west side of Cedar Mesa also includes large canyons, including John's and Slickhorn Canyons, and the combination of Grand Gulch and Bullet Canyon known as the Grand Gulch Primitive Area. To the northwest is the Natural Bridges National Monument and Stimper Arch.

State Route 95 crosses the northern part of Cedar Mesa, while U.S. Route 163 passes to the south. Running up the center of the mesa is State Route 261. Gravel and dirt roads provide access in dry weather to the individual canyons, through the Valley of the Gods, and to Comb Wash.

== Archaeology ==
As early as 13,000 years ago Clovis people, who are considered to be the ancestors of most of the indigenous cultures of the Americas, hunted in Cedar Mesa using "Clovis points". One of the oldest known archaeological sites with Clovis tools in Utah is Lime Ridge Clovis Site.

== See also ==
- Cedar Mesa Sandstone, named for outcrops on Cedar Mesa
