= Cadillac Desert (film) =

- DVD/Video Cover
- Directed by: Jon Else; Linda Harrar
- Written by: Jon Else; Sandra Postel; Marc Reisner
- Produced by: Sandra Itkoff
- Narrated by: Alfre Woodard
- Cinematography: Hilyard John Brown; Michael Chin; Jon Else
- Edited by: Robert Dalva; Deborah Hoffmann; Glenn Hunsberger
- Music by: Martin Bresnick
- Production companies: KTEH; Trans Pacific TV
- Distributed by: Columbia Pictures Television
- Release date: June 24, 1997 (United States)
- Running time: 270 minutes
- Country: United States
- Language: English

Cadillac Desert: Water and the Transformation of Nature is a 1997 American four-part documentary series about water, money, politics, and the transformation of nature. The film was directed by Jon H. Else and Linda Harrar.

== Synopsis ==
The film chronicles the growth of a large community in the western American desert. It brought abundance and a legacy of risk created in the United States and abroad.

The first three episodes are based on Marc Reisner's book, Cadillac Desert (1986), that delves into the history of water use and misuse in the American West. It explores the triumph and disaster, heroism and intrigue, and the rivalries and bedfellows that dominate this little-known chapter of American history.

The final episode is drawn from Sandra Postel's book, Last Oasis (1992), which examines the global impact of the technologies and policies that came out of the United States' manipulation of water. She demonstrates how they have created the need for conservation methods that will protect Earth's water for the next century.

The parts of the documentary are entitled:

1. "Mulholland's Dream" (90 minutes)
2. "An American Nile" (60 minutes)
3. "The Mercy of Nature" (60 minutes)
4. "Last Oasis" (60 minutes)

== Interviews ==
- David Brower
- Floyd Dominy
- Barry Goldwater
- Robert Towne

== See also ==
- Cadillac Desert by Marc Reisner.
