= Glen Canyon Dam =

Dam in Arizona, USA

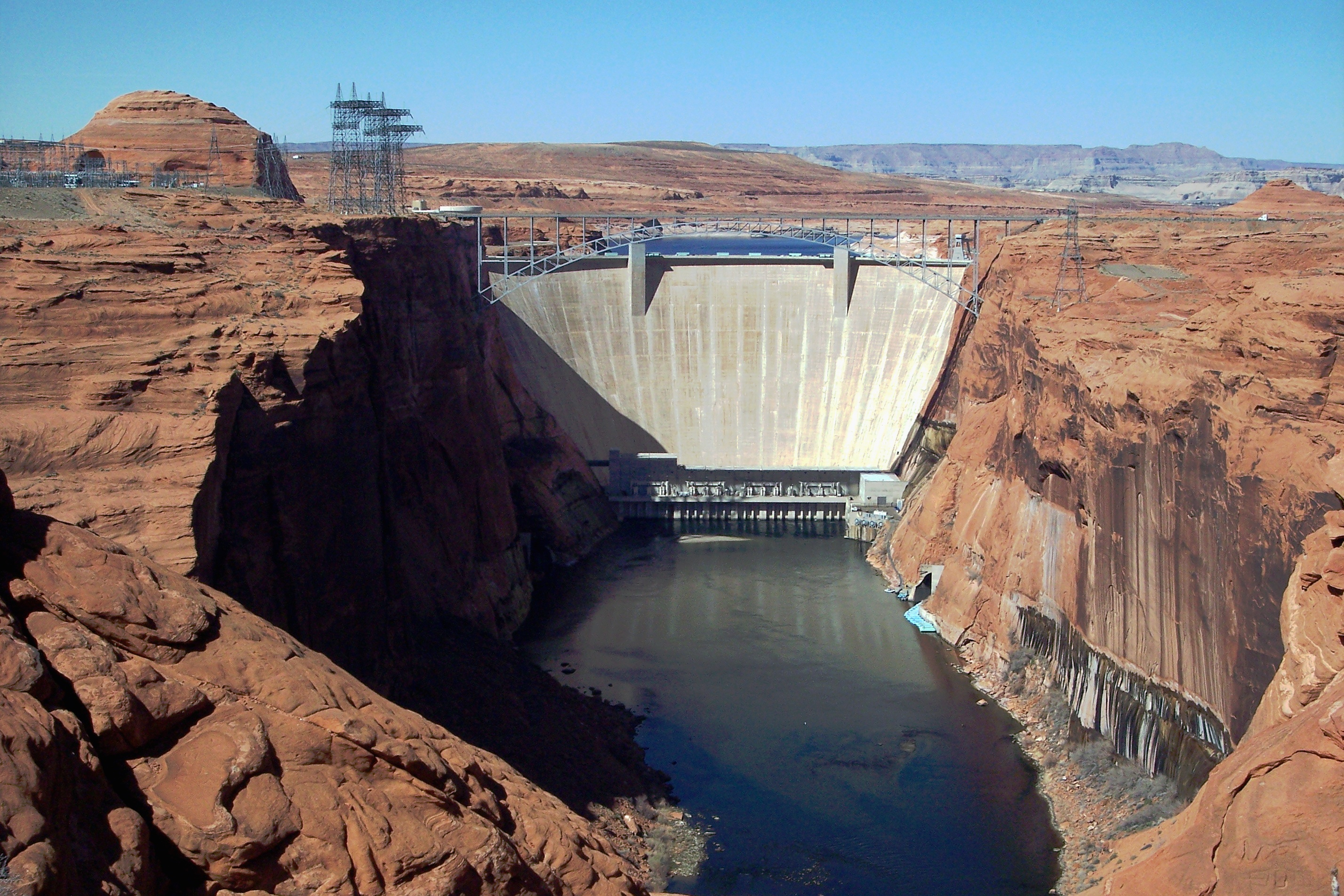
- Glen Canyon Dam and Bridge, looking upstream

- Location in the United States Location in Arizona
- Country: United States
- Location: Coconino County, Arizona
- Coordinates: 36°56′15″N 111°29′04″W
- Construction began: 1956; 70 years ago
- Opening date: 1966; 60 years ago
- Construction cost: $135 million ($1.02 billion in 2025 dollars)
- Owner: U.S. Bureau of Reclamation

Dam and spillways
- Type of dam: Arch-gravity dam
- Impounds: Colorado River
- Height (foundation): 710 ft (220 m)
- Length: 1,560 ft (480 m)
- Elevation at crest: 3,715 ft (1,132 m)
- Spillway type: Tunnel, gated
- Spillway capacity: 208,000 cu ft/s (5,900 m^{3}/s)

Reservoir
- Creates: Lake Powell
- Total capacity: 25,160,000 acre⋅ft (31.03 km^{3})
- Catchment area: 108,335 mi^{2} (280,590 km^{2})
- Surface area: 161,390 acres (65,310 ha)

Power Station
- Commission date: 1964 (first 2 units)
- Turbines: 8 x 254,000 hp Francis turbines
- Installed capacity: 1,320 MW
- Capacity factor: 40.79%
- Annual generation: 4,717 GWh

Glen Canyon Dam is a concrete arch-gravity dam in the southwestern United States, located on the Colorado River in northern Arizona, near the city of Page. The 710-foot-high (220 m) dam was built by the Bureau of Reclamation (USBR) from 1956 to 1966 and forms Lake Powell, one of the largest man-made reservoirs in the U.S. with a capacity of more than 25 million acre-feet (31 km^{3}). The dam is named for Glen Canyon, a series of deep sandstone gorges now flooded by the reservoir; Lake Powell is named for John Wesley Powell, who in 1869 led the first expedition to traverse the Colorado River's Grand Canyon by boat. Glen Canyon and Lake Powell are managed by the Department of the Interior within Glen Canyon National Recreation Area.

A dam in Glen Canyon was studied as early as 1924, but these plans were initially dropped in favor of the Hoover Dam (completed in 1936) which was located in the Black Canyon. By the 1950s, due to rapid population growth in the seven U.S. and two Mexican states comprising the Colorado River Basin, the Bureau of Reclamation deemed the construction of additional reservoirs necessary. The Glen Canyon Dam remains a central issue for modern environmentalist movements. Beginning in the late 1990s, the Sierra Club and other organizations renewed the call to drain Lake Powell and dismantle the dam.

Since first filling to capacity in 1980, Lake Powell water levels have fluctuated greatly depending on water demand and annual runoff. The operation of Glen Canyon Dam helps ensure an equitable distribution of water between the states of the Upper Colorado River Basin (Colorado, Wyoming, and most of New Mexico and Utah) and the Lower Basin (California, Nevada and most of Arizona). During years of drought, Glen Canyon guarantees a water delivery to the Lower Basin states, without the need for rationing in the Upper Basin. In wet years, it captures extra runoff for future use. The dam is also a major source of hydroelectricity, averaging over 4 billion kilowatt hours per year. The long and winding Lake Powell, known for its scenic beauty and recreational opportunities including houseboating, fishing and water skiing, attracts millions of tourists each year to the Glen Canyon National Recreation Area.

In addition to its flooding of the scenic Glen Canyon, the dam's economic justification was questioned by some critics. It became "a catalyst for the modern environmental movement," and was one of the last dams of its size to be built in the United States. The dam has been criticized for the large evaporative losses from Lake Powell and its impact on the ecology of the Grand Canyon, which lies downstream; environmental groups continue to advocate for the dam's removal. Water managers and utilities state that the dam is a major source of renewable energy and provides a buffer for severe droughts.

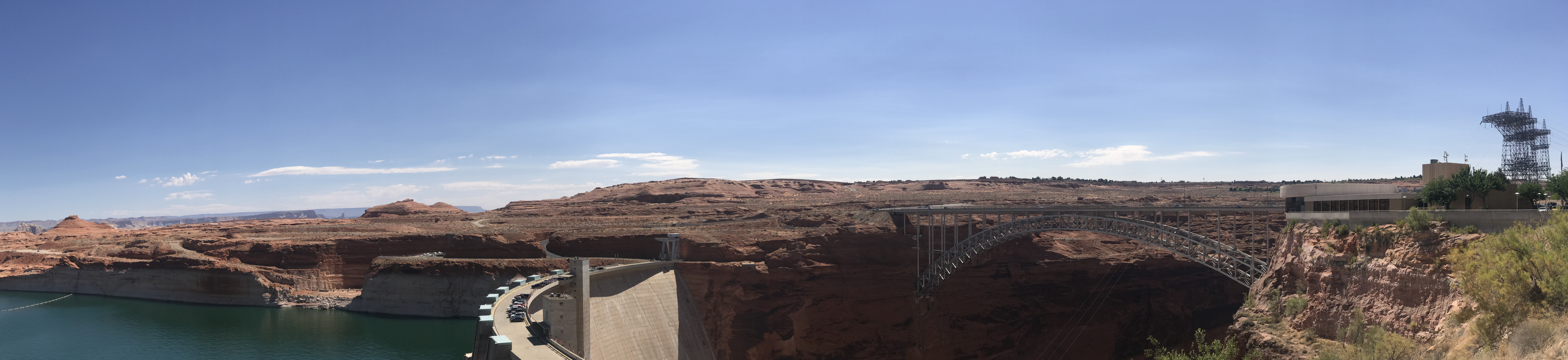
Panorama of Glen Canyon Dam showing Lake Powell, Glen Canyon Dam and Carl Hayden Visitor Center

== Background ==
=== The need for a dam ===
The Colorado River is the single largest source of water in the southwestern United States and northwest Mexico; before massive dam projects tamed the river in the 20th century, its flow was far from dependable. Annual discharge from the Colorado River and its tributaries ranges from 4 to 22 million acre-feet (4.9 to 27.1 km^{3}), and 10-year averages may fluctuate as much as 1 million acre-feet (1.2 km^{3}). Flooding, and the river's enormous silt or sediment load, created problems for settlements in the Lower Colorado River Valley and navigation on the lower portion of the river. During droughts, there was too little water available for irrigation. In 1904, the Colorado River was accidentally redirected after it damaged a canal gate in Mexico, causing the river to flood part of California's Imperial Valley and create the Salton Sea. After this catastrophe, California and Arizona began to call for a dam to control the tempestuous river.

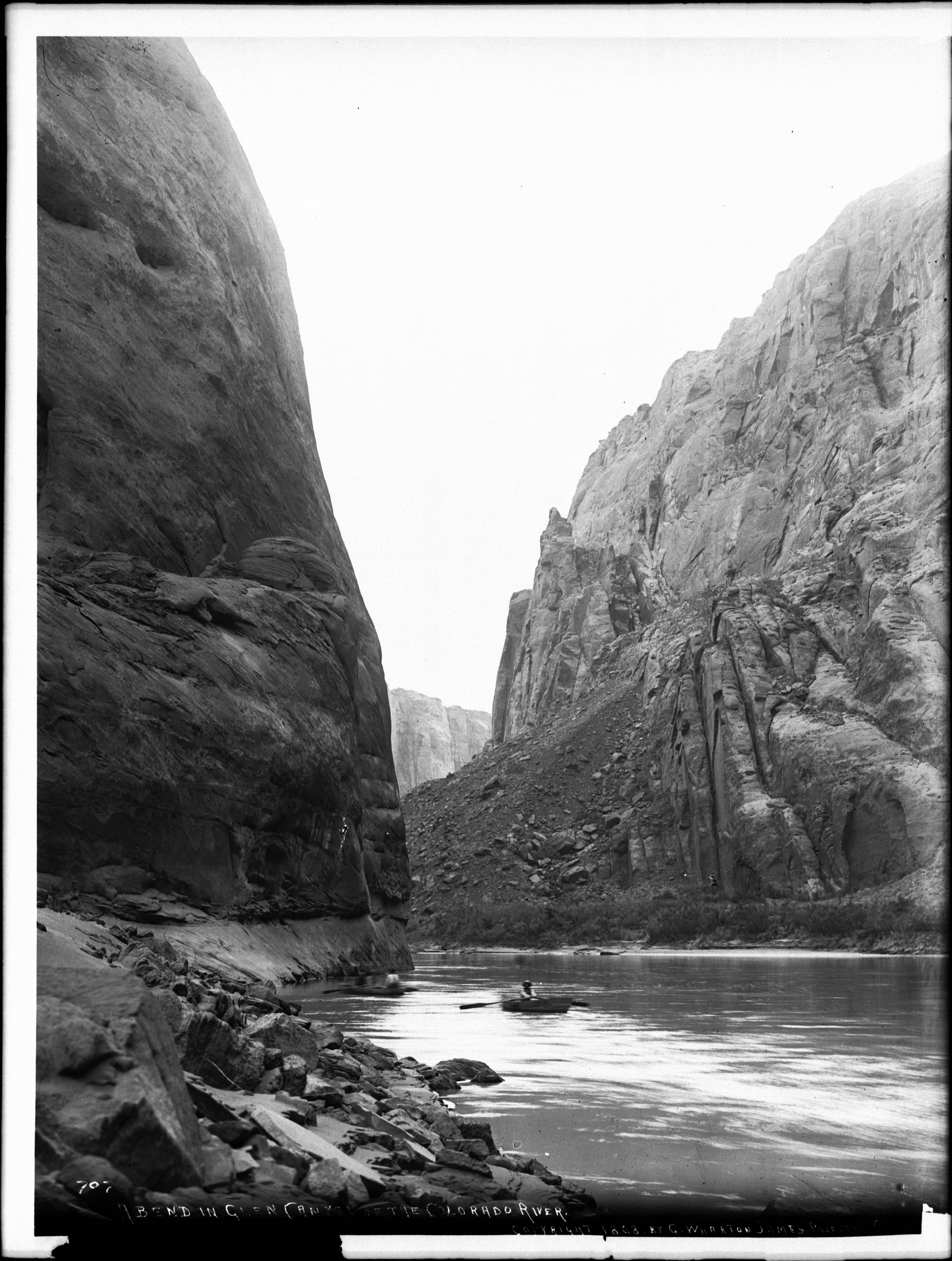
A boater on the river in Glen Canyon before damming, circa 1898.

In 1922, six U.S. states signed the Colorado River Compact to officially allocate the flow of the Colorado River and its tributaries. Each half of the Colorado River Basin—the Upper Basin, comprising Colorado, New Mexico, Utah and Wyoming—and the Lower Basin, with California and Nevada—was allotted 7.5 million acre-feet (9.3 km^{3}) of water annually, and Treaty relating to the utilization of waters of the Colorado and Tijuana Rivers and of the Rio Grande was signed in 1944 allocating 1.5 million acre-feet (1.9 km^{3}) to Mexico. The third lower basin state, Arizona, did not ratify the Compact until 1944 because it was concerned that California might seek to appropriate a portion of its share before it could be put to use.

The total, 16.5 million acre-feet (20.4 km^{3}), was based on only thirty years of streamflow records starting in the late 1890s. It was believed to represent the annual flow as measured at Lee's Ferry, Arizona (the official dividing point of the upper and lower basins), 16 miles (26 km) downstream of present-day Glen Canyon Dam. As it turned out, the early 20th century was one of the wettest periods in the last 800 years. The dependable natural flow past Lees Ferry is now believed to be about 13.5 to 14.6 million acre-feet (16.7 to 18.0 km^{3}).

The general consensus among inhabitants of the Colorado River basin and government officials was that a high dam had to be built on the Colorado to control floods and provide carry-over water storage for times of drought. Possible locations for this dam were debated for years, and the Bureau of Reclamation's first study for a dam at Glen Canyon was made in 1924, in addition to studies for locations at Black and Boulder Canyons lower on the Colorado, below Grand Canyon. These studies found that the lower Colorado sites had stronger foundation rock which might result in less reservoir seepage. The Glen Canyon site was so remote that delivering supplies and transporting workers there would be infeasible at the time. The first Glen Canyon proposal lay upstream of the Lee's Ferry dividing line, and would be considered the Upper Basin's water. With its substantial Congressional clout, California refused to allow the "virtual faucets" of a Colorado River dam "to be built in what amounted to hostile territory."

With the Glen Canyon site out of the question, the initial need for a reservoir was realized in 1936 with the completion of Hoover Dam in Black Canyon, storing 32 million acre-feet (39 km^{3}) in the mammoth reservoir of Lake Mead. It was not able to weather the worst floods or droughts, and was filling with sediment at a rate that would render it useless in a few hundred years. But most importantly, Hoover only controlled the lower portion of the river. The Upper Basin states, whose rivers remained undammed, had no way to ensure they could fulfill their delivery obligation to the Lower Basin states while retaining enough water for their own use. Without storage reservoirs of their own, the Upper Basin states risked a "call" on the Colorado River during drought years: they would be forced to use less water in order to keep the river flowing to Lake Mead and California, the state with the most senior water rights.

=== Colorado River Storage Project ===
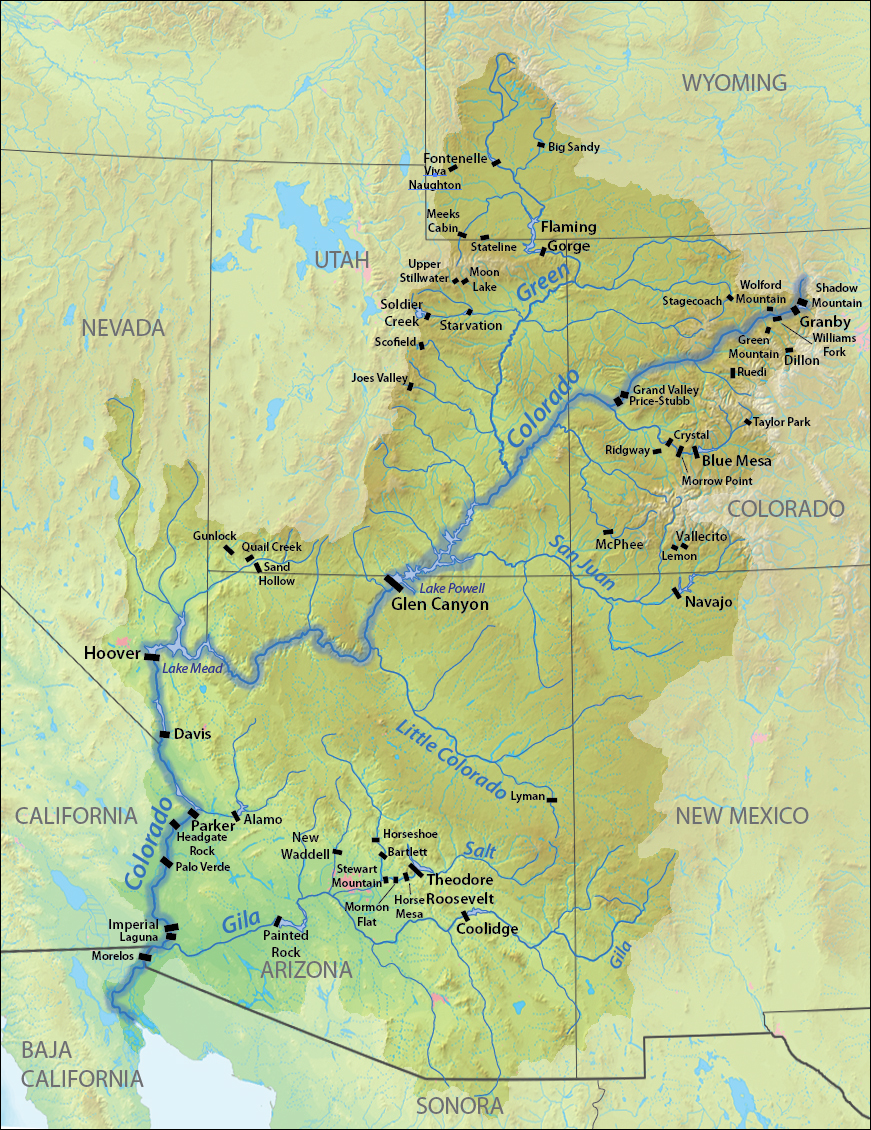
Map showing locations of major dams in the Colorado River Basin, with Glen Canyon near the center of the basin.

To provide water for the Upper Basin and ensure delivery to the Lower Basin, the Bureau of Reclamation proposed the Colorado River Storage Project, which would consist of a dam on the Colorado River at Glen Canyon, several dams on the Gunnison River and San Juan River, and a pair of dams to be built on the Green River, the Colorado's major upper tributary, at Echo Park and Split Mountain. The 1956 Colorado River Storage Project Act authorized the purposes of "regulating the flow of the Colorado River, storing water for beneficial consumptive use, providing for reclamation of arid and semi-arid lands, providing flood control, and generating hydropower."

The proposal for Glen Canyon Dam was most vocally supported by the state of Arizona, which wished to get Colorado River water to Phoenix and Tucson, located hundreds of miles away from the Colorado in the center of the state. Glen Canyon Dam would regulate river flow between Lee's Ferry and Lake Mead, where the Colorado drops some 1,200 feet (370 m), allowing the future construction of two additional hydroelectric dams, at Marble Canyon and Bridge Canyon. These two dams would be partially inside Grand Canyon National Park. Glen, Marble and Bridge together would provide the power necessary to pump water to where it was needed in central Arizona. In 1963, Arizona's congressional delegation proposed these dams as part of the Central Arizona Project to accomplish these goals. The state of California opposed the project, as it would eliminate the "surplus" water in the Colorado (really the Upper Basin's yet unused supplies) it had gotten accustomed to using.

The Bureau of Reclamation recognized a more serious problem. Construction of the Storage Project, and allowing the Upper Basin to develop its water supplies, would tip the whole Colorado River system toward a structural water deficit since the Colorado River's average flow is less than what was apportioned in the 1922 Compact. The USBR predicted that by 2030 the annual water supply for the Lower Basin would fall by twenty-five percent, to 5.62 million acre-feet (6.93 km^{3}). To make up for this deficit, the USBR incorporated these proposals with the "Pacific Southwest Water Plan" on January 21, 1964, in which power sales from Glen, Marble and Bridge (often called "cash register dams") would be used to fund a diversion of water from the wetter Pacific Northwest to the Colorado Basin. In addition to the proposed diversion of the Trinity River in Northern California, Marc Reisner wrote in Cadillac Desert that "in the Pacific Northwest there was a lot of suspicion that the Pacific Southwest Water Plan was merely a smokescreen for a much larger plan, long a gleam in the Colorado Basin's eye, to tap the Columbia River."

=== Environmental concerns ===
... Echo Park was a pure indulgence in the most austere of deserts. In autumn, its groves of cottonwood and yellowing willow gave it a New England air. In the spring, the swollen Green [River] would flood the canyon bottom and leave lush meadows as it went. Echo Park was probably the most beautiful canyon flat in all of Utah, part of Dinosaur National Monument. It was also an ideal site for a dam.

— Marc Reisner, Cadillac Desert (1986)

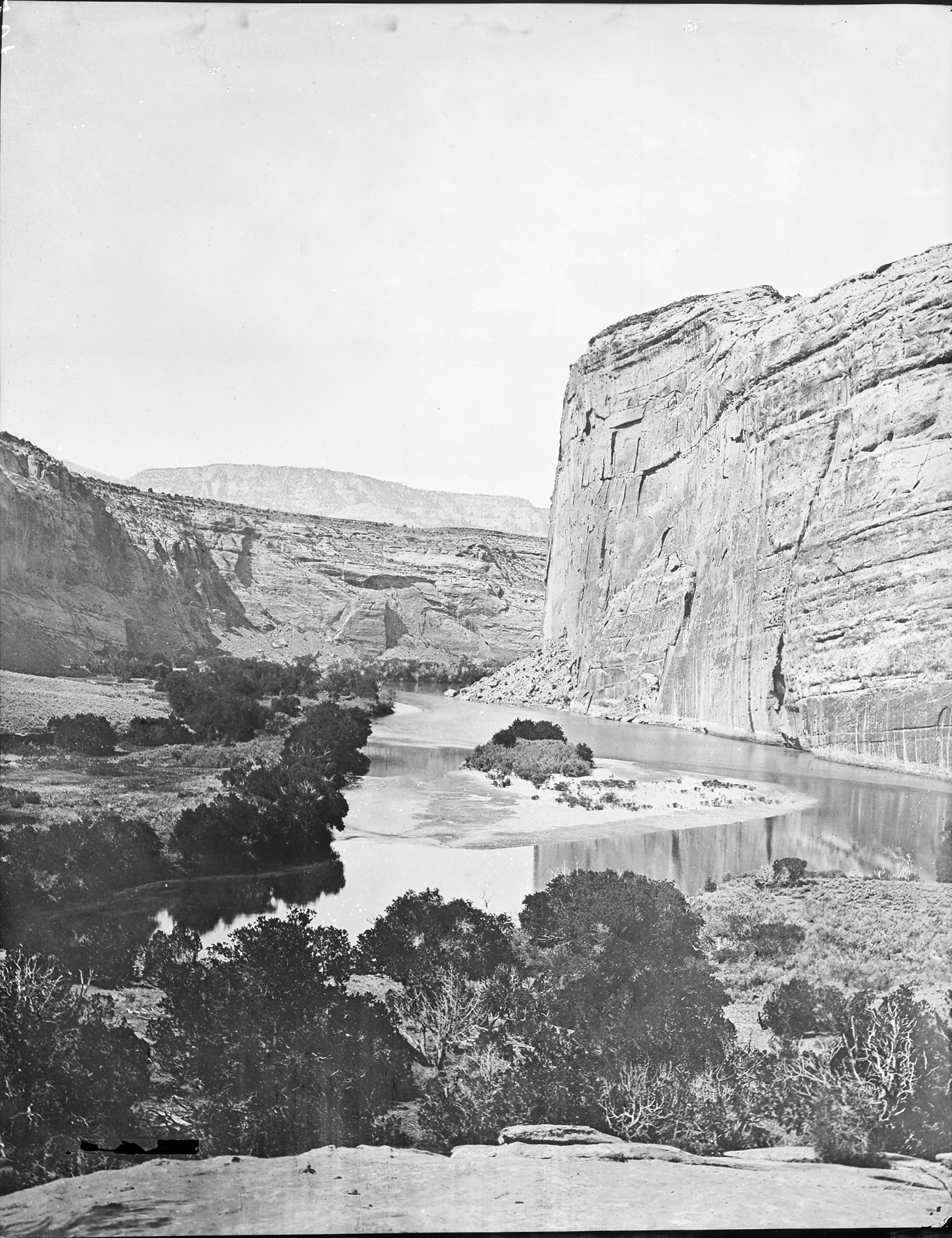
Echo Park, looking south with the Yampa River (left) joining the Green River. The USBR proposed damming the Green a short distance downstream, behind the large cliff (Steamboat Rock) at right.

The Echo Park dam would be inside the federally protected Dinosaur National Monument and would submerge 110 miles (180 km) of scenic canyons – a move that alarmed environmentalists. The environmental organization Sierra Club, led by David Brower, was the most vocal opponent of Echo Park Dam, and fought a protracted battle against the Bureau of Reclamation, on the basis that "building the dam would not only destroy a unique wilderness area, but would set a terrible precedent for exploiting resources in America's national parks and monuments".

The Bureau of Reclamation favored the Echo Park site over Glen Canyon, because its narrow canyons and high elevation (more than 5,000 feet (1,500 m), as compared to 3,700 feet (1,100 m) at Glen Canyon) would lead to less evaporation. It said that building Echo Park Dam and a "low" Glen Canyon Dam would save 165 thousand acre-feet (0.204 km^{3}) of water per year over a "high" Glen Canyon Dam (which was ultimately the version to be built). While studying the figures, Brower discovered that the difference should be no more than 19 thousand acre-feet (0.023 km^{3}). Although it is unclear whether the discrepancy was due to a miscalculation or intentional manipulation, Brower said "it would be a great mistake [to rely on the Bureau's figures] when they cannot add, subtract, multiply and divide."

In the face of public scrutiny, and wishing to avoid more questions about the Colorado River Storage Project as a whole, the Bureau of Reclamation dropped the Echo Park proposal in 1954. Even as construction began on the other dams, the drama of the Echo Park debate had shifted the American public's perception on big government projects and their environmental consequences. Echo Park was considered a victory for the American environmental movement, but it only happened in exchange for a dam upstream at Flaming Gorge, and increasing the size of the proposed dam at Glen Canyon to replace the storage that would have been provided by Echo Park. A common misconception is that the environmentalists were given a choice between damming Echo Park and damming Glen Canyon, but the USBR "had always planned to build a dam at Glen Canyon, regardless of the outcome of the Echo Park debate".

[The Colorado River without dams] is useless to anyone ... I've seen all the wild rivers I ever wanted to see.

— Floyd Dominy, Bureau of Reclamation Commissioner, 1966 speech

Floyd Dominy, commissioner of the Bureau of Reclamation, was a vital figure in pushing the project through Congress and convincing politicians to take a pro-dam stance, and to assuage rising public concerns. Dominy realized that the USBR had considerable political clout in Western states, due to the economic contributions of its water projects. Reisner wrote that "Dominy cultivated Congress as if he were tending prize-winning orchids ... If some Senator was causing him trouble, money for his project could disappear mighty fast." With the necessary political support secured, the Colorado River Storage Project was authorized in April 1956, and groundbreaking of Glen Canyon Dam began in October of the same year.

David Brower visited Glen Canyon shortly after the decision to build the dam, and "realized once he arrived that this was not a place for a reservoir". Glen Canyon's springs, side canyons, and intricately sculpted rock formations were home to such features as Music Temple and Cathedral in the Desert, a giant cave-like natural amphitheater with a waterfall at its center. The Colorado River flowed gently across the bottom of the canyon, in sharp contrast to the roaring rapids upstream in Cataract Canyon and downstream in the Grand Canyon. After his groundbreaking 1869 expedition, John Wesley Powell had named Glen Canyon for its characteristics: "So we have a curious ensemble of wonderful features – carved walls, royal arches, glens, alcove gulches, mounds and monuments. From which of these features shall we select a name? We decide to call it Glen Canyon." In addition to its variegated rock formations, Glen Canyon supported a rich riparian zone habitat on the numerous low river terraces formed by the Colorado River, with as many as 316 bird species, 79 plant species and 34 kinds of mammals.

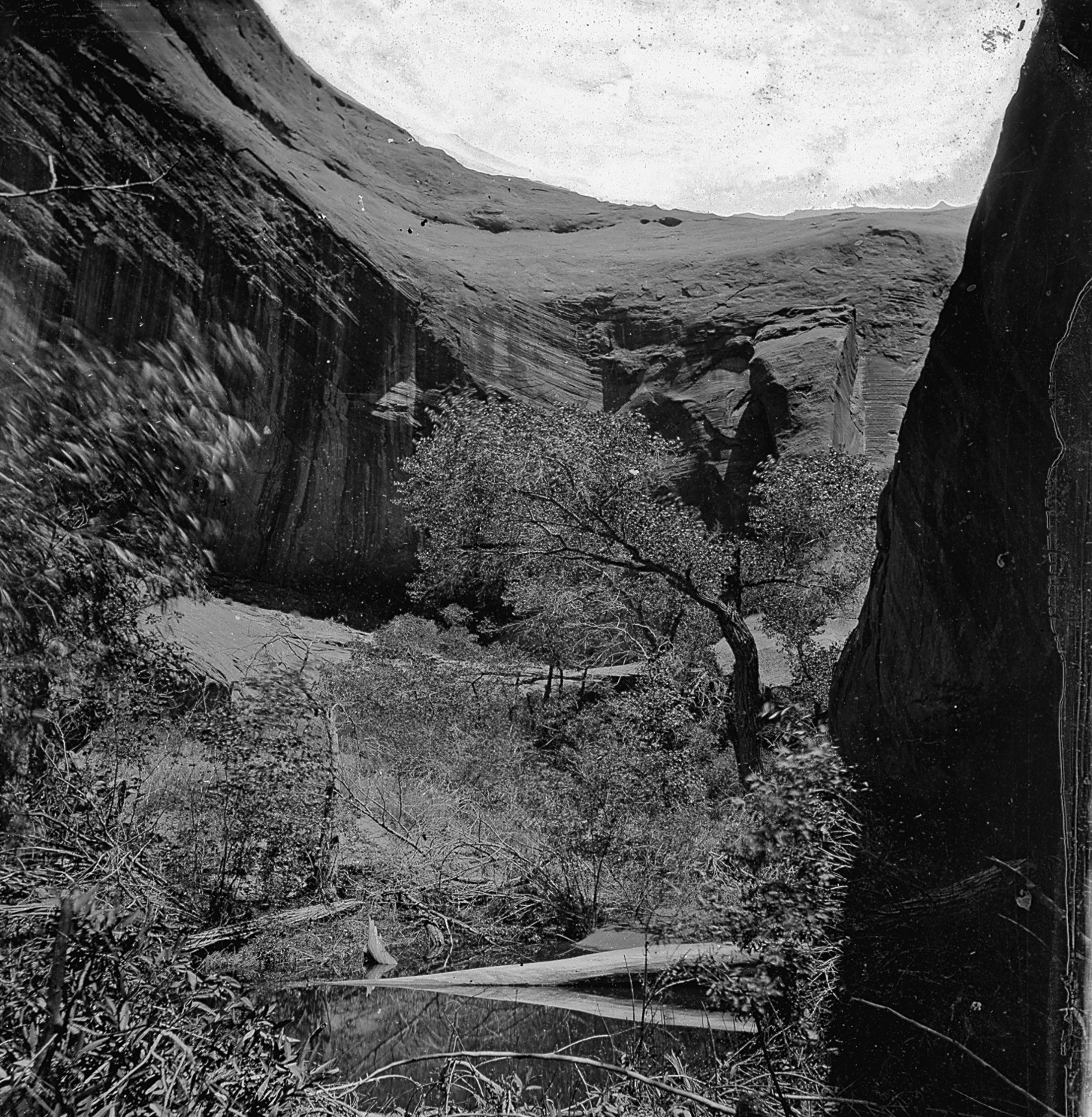
Near Music Temple in Glen Canyon during the 1870s

In 1963, when construction on the dam was well underway, the Sierra Club published a book on Glen Canyon, The Place No One Knew, featuring photographs by Eliot Porter, and lamenting the loss of the canyon before most of the American public had a chance to visit, or were even aware of its existence. Though little known to most Americans before Porter's book, Glen Canyon had been visited by a handful of hikers and boaters (such as Powell's expedition), and some had even been interviewed by Brower. As said to Brower by writer Wallace Stegner, who had been to the canyon in 1947, "Echo doesn't hold a candle to Glen."

Emboldened by Echo Park and desperate to prevent the Grand Canyon from reaching the same fate as Glen, Brower and the Sierra Club directed attention towards the proposed Bridge and Marble dams. The Sierra Club launched an extensive publicity campaign to sway public opinion against the plan; in response to the USBR's argument that new reservoirs would open up the Grand Canyon to recreational boaters as Lake Powell had, a full-page advertisement in the New York Times ran the slogan: "Should we also flood the Sistine Chapel so tourists can float nearer the ceiling?" Faced with public outcry, the Bureau abandoned its Grand Canyon dams, effectively terminating most of the Pacific Southwest Water Plan, in 1968. The coal-fired Navajo Generating Station was built near Page, to make up for the electric power that was lost with the cancellation of the dam project. The Sierra Club lost its IRS tax-exempt status a day after the advertisement was released due to its disruptive political activities. The group's membership more than doubled in the next three years, many of them citizens unhappy with the IRS's apparent overreach.

== Construction ==
=== Site preparations ===
As early as 1947, the Bureau of Reclamation had begun investigating two potential sites, both located in the narrow lower reaches of Glen Canyon shortly upstream of Lee's Ferry. The site originally favored by the USBR was just 4 miles (6.4 km) upstream, but the final decision was to build the dam 16.5 miles (26.6 km) upstream because of stronger foundation rock and easier access to gravel deposits on Wahweap Creek. Because the dam site lay in a remote, rugged area of the Colorado Plateau – more than 30 miles (48 km) from the closest paved road, U.S. Route 89 – a new road had to be constructed, branching off from US 89 north of Flagstaff, Arizona, and running through the dam site to its terminus at Kanab, Utah. Because of the isolated location, acquiring the land at the dam and reservoir sites was not particularly difficult, but there were a few disputes with ranchers and miners in the area (many of the Navajo Nation). Much of the land acquired for the dam was through an exchange with the Navajo, in which the tribe ceded Manson Mesa south of the dam site for a similar-sized chunk of land near Aneth, Utah, which the Navajo had long coveted.

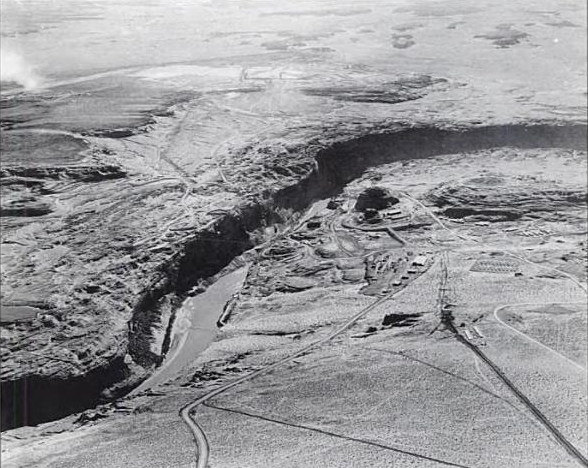
Glen Canyon damsite from the air in November 1957, prior to construction of the Glen Canyon Bridge

In the early stages of construction, the only way to cross Glen Canyon was a suspension footbridge made of chicken wire and metal grates. Vehicles had to make a 225-mile (362 km) journey in order to get from one side of the canyon to the other. A road link was urgently needed, in order to safely accommodate workers and heavy construction equipment. The contract for building the bridge was awarded to Peter Kiewit Sons and the Judson Pacific Murphy Co. for $4 million and construction began in late 1956, reaching completion on August 11, 1957. When finished, the steel arch Glen Canyon Bridge was itself a marvel of engineering: at 1,271 feet (387 m) long and rising 700 feet (210 m) above the river, it was the highest bridge of its kind in the United States and one of the highest in the world. The bridge soon became a major tourist attraction. The March 1959 issue of LIFE reported that "motorists [were] driving miles out of their way just to be thrilled by its dizzying height."

Workers moved to the dam site beginning in the mid-late 1950s; the construction camp started out as a haphazardly organized trailer park that grew with the workforce. During the construction of the Glen Canyon Bridge, the USBR also began planning a company town to house the workers. This resulted in the town of Page, Arizona, named for former Reclamation Commissioner John C. Page. By 1959, Page had a host of temporary buildings, electricity, and a small school serving workers' children. As the city grew, it gathered additional features, including numerous stores, a hospital, and even a jeweler. It was intended to serve a maximum population of eight thousand, accounting for the workers' families; the peak workforce would eventually exceed 2,500 in the busiest phases of construction. The engineer in charge of the project would be Lem F. Wylie, who had worked on Hoover Dam and had previously designed six other USBR dams.

Prior to and during construction, three separate grants were issued by the National Park Service to document and recover artifacts of historical cultures along the river. These went to University of Utah historian C. Gregory Crampton and anthropologist Jesse Jennings, and to the Museum of Northern Arizona. Crampton subsequently wrote several books and articles on his findings. The Museum of Northern Arizona funded an expedition by William Miller and Helmut Abt, in coordination with the Navajo Nation, to investigate historical artifacts. They discovered a petroglyph in the upper part of the canyon depicting the appearance of the Crab Nebula in 1054.

=== River diversion ===
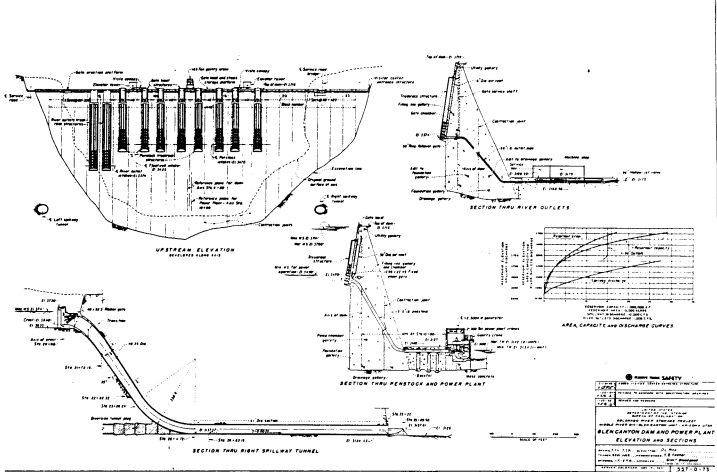
Architectural plans for the Glen Canyon Dam and ancillary structures

In 1956, work began on the two diversion tunnels that would carry the Colorado River around the dam site during construction. Each of the tunnels was 41 feet (12 m) in diameter, with a combined capacity of 200,000 cubic feet per second (5,700 m^{3}/s); the right-side tunnel was 2,740 feet (840 m) long and the left 2,900 feet (880 m). The right tunnel would be used for carrying the Colorado's normal flow around the dam site, while the left tunnel, 33 feet (10 m) above the water, would only be used during floods. The lower reaches of the tunnels would later be used to form the lower ends of the dam's spillways. About 182,000 cubic yards (139,000 m^{3}) of material would have to be excavated from the diversion tunnels.

On October 15, 1956, President Dwight D. Eisenhower pressed a button on his desk in Washington, D.C., sending a telegraph signal that set off the first blast of dynamite at the portal of the right diversion tunnel. Drilling the tunnels through the porous Navajo sandstone abutting the dam site posed major problems for the excavation crews of the Mountain States Construction Company, which won the contract for the diversion tunnels in 1956. Transporting workers and equipment to the bottom of the canyon was extremely difficult. Initially, transport was done by barge from Wahweap Creek, but the fast current of the Colorado River could be dangerous. After a barge capsized, spilling tons of machinery into the river, a much safer cable-car system was installed. During excavation, the rock frequently broke apart or "slabbed" and collapsed into the tunnels, and metal bolts had to be drilled into the rock to secure it. The largest such event, on August 5, 1958, sent 5,200 cubic yards (4,000 m^{3}) crashing down onto the upper portal of the left diversion tunnel.

Material dug out of the tunnels and the dam abutments on the canyon walls was used to build the two cofferdams to divert the Colorado River, which were complete in February 1960. The upper cofferdam was 168 feet (51 m) high, and it alone could store several million acre-feet of water to protect the dam site from flooding in the event that inflows exceeded the capacity of the diversion tunnels. On February 11, 1959, the right diversion tunnel was completed and began to carry the flow of the Colorado. The left tunnel was finished over three months later on May 19, 1959, slightly behind schedule.

=== Concrete placement and completion ===
It looked as if they [Merritt-Chapman & Scott] were going to start losing money before they dropped a single man with a three-dollar shovel into that canyon. It was one thing to submit a low-ball bid, but it was quite another to pay for the privilege of breaking the company's back.

— Russell Martin, A Story That Stands Like A Dam (1990)

With the Colorado River safely diverted around the canyon, construction could begin on the actual concrete arch dam. The contract was given to the Merritt-Chapman & Scott Corporation for an "astoundingly low" $107,955,552, about $30 million less than USBR's own estimate. Then, right before construction began, about 750 workers organized a strike because of a wage reduction due to the completion of public facilities at Page. In December 1959, wages were raised by $4 a day, quelling the strikers. Concrete placement started on June 16, 1960, and started at a sluggish but growing pace. In 1962 the workforce topped out at nearly 2,500 employees laboring on the dam. Construction would ultimately claim eighteen lives and injure numerous other workers, but contrary to popular myth, no workers were buried alive in the concrete. Cement needed to make concrete for the dam came from the Phoenix Cement Company plant constructed for the purpose in Clarkdale, south of Flagstaff.

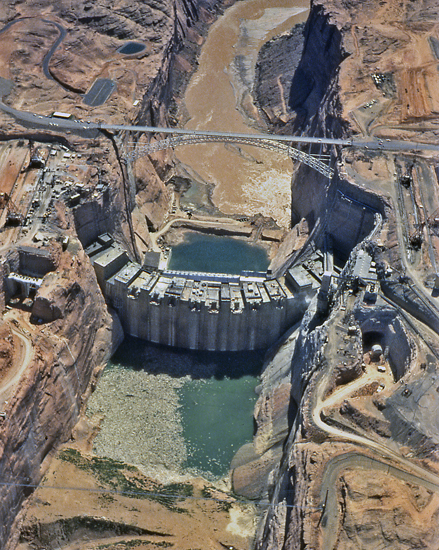
Glen Canyon Dam under construction, 1962

A huge concrete plant capable of putting out 1,450 tons per hour was installed, and a pair of cableways with movable towers (with capacities of 50 and 25 tons respectively) spanned the canyon, carrying the 12-cubic-yard (9.2 m^{3}) concrete buckets to their final destinations on the steadily rising crest of the dam. The concrete was poured into modular 7.5-foot (2.3 m) high wooden blocks or "forms", the largest measuring up to 60 feet (18 m) by 210 feet (64 m); more than 3,000 of these blocks made up the main structure of the dam. Once the concrete cured, the wooden scaffolding was removed and shifted upwards to accommodate the next load of concrete. As more efficient methods of concrete pouring were installed, including conveyors and remotely controlled buckets, the workforce gradually decreased. By late 1962, concrete was being poured into the dam at a rate of 8,000 cubic yards (6,100 m^{3}) per day even as the workforce was scaled down to about 1,500.

At the beginning of 1963, the dam was 600 feet high, enough to begin impounding water; huge steel gates were closed over the right diversion tunnel on January 21, and Lake Powell began to rise. A minimal flow of 1,000 cubic feet per second (28 m^{3}/s) was allowed through the dam, to prevent the Colorado River from drying up completely. On that day, David Brower confronted President John F. Kennedy in a last-ditch effort to delay Glen Canyon's inundation. Brower later said of that exchange: "On January 2, 1963, the last day on which the execution of one of the planet's greatest scenic antiquities could yet have been spared, the man who theoretically had the power to save the place did not. I was within a few feet of his desk in Washington that day and witnessed how the forces long at work had their way. So a steel gate dropped, choking off the flow of the canyon's carotid artery, and from that moment the canyon's life force ebbed quickly. A huge reservoir, absolutely not needed in this century, almost certainly not needed in the next, and conceivably never to be needed at all, began to fill."

Construction continued and on September 13, 1963, the dam was topped out. Work on the power plant and spillways began directly after the dam wall was complete. The spillway tunnels were excavated around both abutments of the dam, dropping steeply from their control gates on Lake Powell to merge with the lower ends of the diversion tunnels. This measure saved cost, but introduced a weak point where the two tunnels intersected. The upper ends of the diversion tunnels were then sealed with solid concrete. The first electricity was generated on September 4, 1964, with the power sent into the regional electric grid through a pair of long-distance transmission lines as far as Phoenix, Arizona and Farmington, New Mexico. It took two more years to complete all remaining aspects of the project. On September 22, 1966 Lady Bird Johnson gave the official dedication speech for Glen Canyon Dam, before a crowd of 3,000 people.

=== Filling Lake Powell ===
With a capacity equal to almost two years' annual flow of the Colorado River, engineers were aware that Lake Powell would be difficult to fill, but more problems were encountered than expected. The original plan was to fill Lake Powell to 3,490 feet (1,060 m) above sea level, the minimum level necessary to generate hydroelectric power by late 1964, after which water would be released down to Lake Mead, with only the excess stored in Lake Powell. The spring runoff in 1963 was the lowest on record in ten years. By the beginning of 1964, Lake Powell had barely reached half the target level, and Lake Mead had seen a sharp decline. In March, Secretary of the Interior Stewart Udall ordered the filling halted and extra releases made to Lake Mead, to the consternation of the Upper Basin states. In May, Udall changed his mind yet again to lower releases, gambling that the spring runoff would be enough to raise Powell to minimum power pool by autumn, by which time power releases could begin, to prevent Lake Mead from falling below its minimum power pool. That gamble paid off, with Lake Powell barely inching over the 3,490-foot (1,060 m) mark on August 16, 1964.

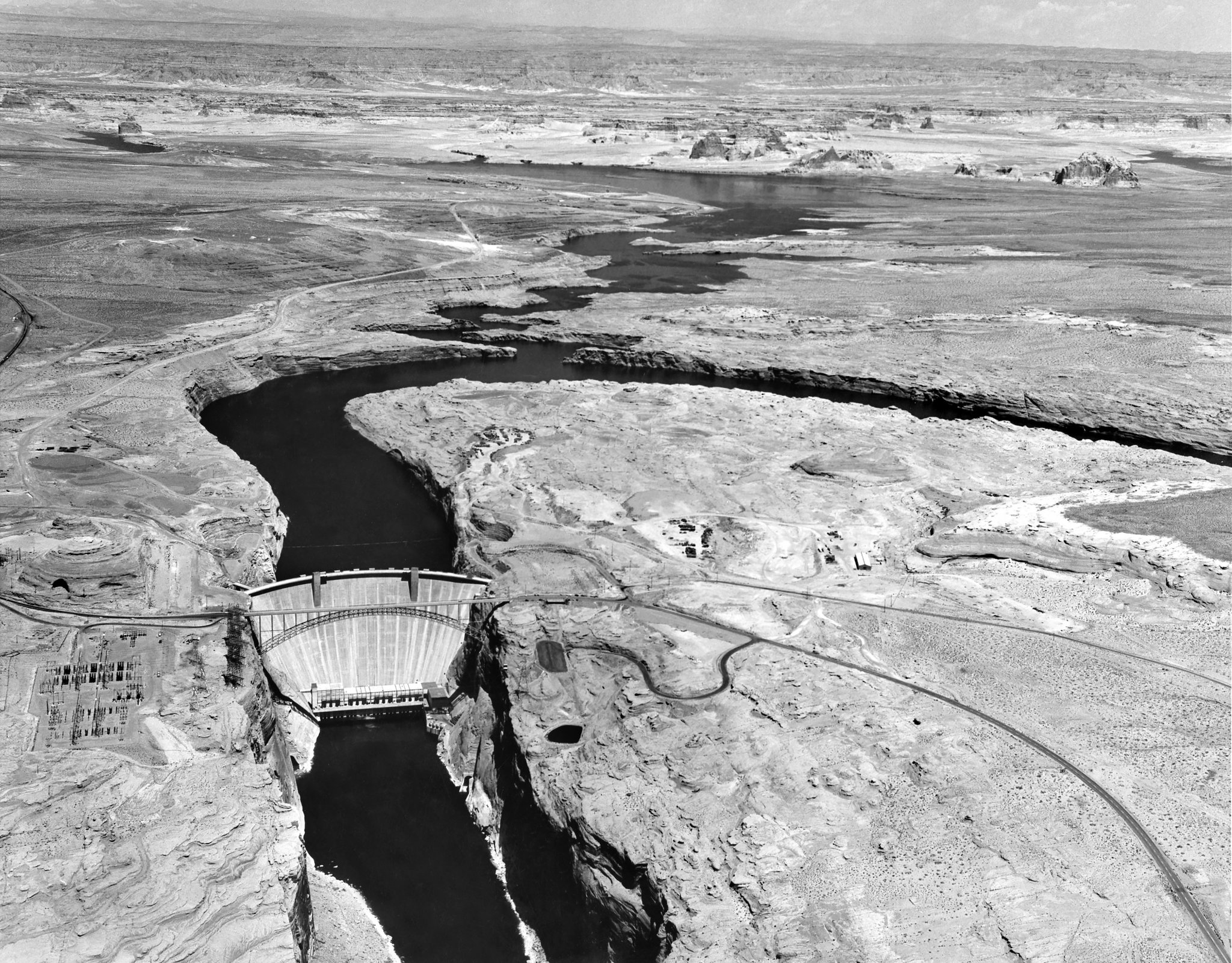
Lake Powell filling underway, 1965

It took more than 17 years for Lake Powell to finally reach its full elevation of 3,700 feet (1,100 m) above sea level, which it crossed on June 22, 1980. One of the main reasons for this slow rise, in addition to the need to meet obligations to the Lower Basin, was the leakage of vast amounts of water into the porous Navajo Sandstone aquifer. Between 1963 and 1969, as much as 655,000 acre-feet (0.808 km^{3}) leaked into the reservoir banks each year. Conversely, some of this "bank storage" flows back into the reservoir as springs and seeps when Lake Powell is low. Exactly how much of this water has potential to return to the reservoir, and how much infiltrates into the ground, is subject to debate.

The Bureau of Reclamation projected that once Lake Powell filled, the total bank storage would stabilize at approximately 6 million acre-feet (7.4 km^{3}), and henceforth would fluctuate depending on water levels in the reservoir. The actual loss was 13.4 million acre-feet (16.5 km^{3}), twice the initial prediction, but river flow data indicates that further leakage after 1980 has been negligible. According to a 2013 study by hydrologist Thomas Myers for the Glen Canyon Institute, the reservoir continues to lose about 380,000 acre-feet (0.47 km^{3}) each year due to leakage. According to USBR data for water year 2015 (a year when Lake Powell did not experience a significant overall gain or loss in volume), Lake Powell lost a total of 368,000 acre-feet (0.454 km^{3}) to evaporation and only 8,000 acre-feet (0.0099 km^{3}) to leakage.

== Later history ==
=== 1983 floods ===
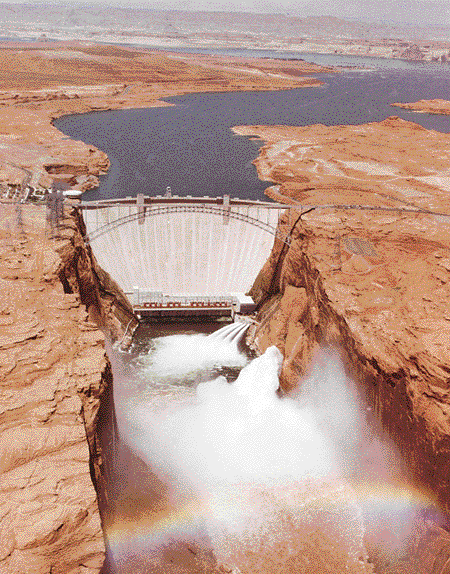
Glen Canyon Dam releasing floodwater in 1984, testing repairs of the spillways which were heavily damaged in 1983.

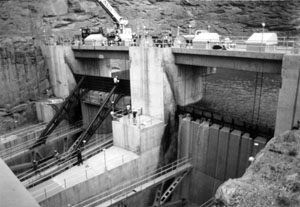
The right spillway gates during 1983 flood, showing flashboards that were installed to increase the water level

During the El Niño winter of 1982–1983, the Bureau of Reclamation predicted an average runoff for the Colorado River basin based on snowpack measurements in the Rocky Mountains. Snowfall during April and May was exceptionally heavy; this combined with a sudden rise in temperatures and unusual rainstorms in June to produce major flooding across the western United States. With Lake Powell nearly full, the USBR did not have enough time to draw down the reservoir to accommodate extra runoff. By mid-June, water was pouring into Lake Powell at over 120,000 cubic feet per second (3,400 m^{3}/s). Even with the power plant and river outlet works running at full capacity, Lake Powell continued to rise to the point where the spillways had to be opened. Other than a brief test in 1980, this was the only time the spillways had ever been used.

At the beginning of June, dam operators opened the gates on the left spillway, sending 10,000 cubic feet per second (280 m^{3}/s), less than one-tenth of capacity, down the tunnel into the river below. After a few days, the entire dam suddenly began to shake violently. The spillway was closed down for inspections and workers discovered that the flow of water was causing cavitation—the explosive collapse of vacuum pockets in water moving at high speed—which was damaging the concrete lining and eroding the rock spillway tunnels from the upper ends of the diversion tunnels, which connect to the bottom of the reservoir. This was rapidly being destroyed by the cavitation and it was feared that a connection would be made to the bottom of Lake Powell, compromising the dam's foundation and causing the dam to fail.

Meanwhile, snow continued melting in the Rockies and Lake Powell continued to rise rapidly. To delay having to use the spillways, the USBR installed plywood flashboards (later replaced by steel) atop the gates to increase the lake level. Even this additional capacity was exhausted; discharges through the left spillway reached 32,000 cubic feet per second (910 m^{3}/s), and the right spillway was opened to 15,000 cubic feet per second (420 m^{3}/s). At Lee's Ferry, the Colorado River peaked at 97,300 cubic feet per second (2,760 m^{3}/s), which was and still is the highest water flow recorded there since the dam was built. On July 14, Lake Powell reached 3,708.34 feet (1,130.30 m) elevation, a level that has not been exceeded since. Just as it seemed inevitable that the dam would fail, inflows fell and the dam was saved. Upon inspection, it was found that cavitation had caused massive gouging damage to both spillways, carrying away thousands of tons of concrete, steel rebar and huge chunks of rock.

Repairs to the spillways commenced as soon as possible and continued well into 1984. Air slots were installed at the bottom of each spillway to break up and absorb the shock of the bubbles formed by cavitation. In 1984, the Colorado River basin produced even more runoff than 1983, peaking at 148,000 cubic feet per second (4,200 m^{3}/s) in early June. This time, the USBR had drawn down the reservoir enough that it absorbed most of the early high flows. Nevertheless, Lake Powell rapidly approached the top of the spillway gates and construction efforts were subsequently focused on the left spillway in order to get it in operation in time. On August 12, the left spillway gates were opened, releasing water at a rate of 50,000 cubic feet per second (1,400 m^{3}/s). The spillway was undamaged, proving the worth of the re-engineering and suggesting that Glen Canyon Dam will also be able to hold against future floods with the magnitude of 1983.

=== Continuing debates ===
Long after the Glen Canyon Dam was built and continuing to the present day, controversy remains between supporters of dam removal and those who believe it should be left in place. One of the earliest debates regarding the dam was its impact on Rainbow Bridge National Monument, whose 290-foot (88 m) high natural arch is the highest in North America, and is a sacred site to the Navajo people. The environmental lobby wanted the Bureau of Reclamation to keep Lake Powell at or below a level of 3,600 feet (1,100 m), to prevent it from intruding into the monument. The Bureau of Reclamation proposed to build a barrier dam and pump system in order to keep water out of the monument. With the potential damage that would be caused to the remote environment, "the cure would be far worse than the disease." The proposal was fought over and litigated for years until it was permanently shelved in 1973.

Glen Canyon Dam became the subject of influential literature, including Edward Abbey's novel The Monkey Wrench Gang (1975), which tells the story of a fictional group of environmentalists fighting against industrial developers in the American Southwest, their ultimate target being Glen Canyon Dam. The novel gained a cult following after its publication and established Glen Canyon Dam as a poster child of environmental destruction caused by dams. Abbey's book is discussed in Ecospeak: Rhetoric and Environmental Politics in America (1992) by Jimmie Killingsworth and Jacqueline Palmer, who write that Glen Canyon Dam became "the big symbol of all that blocked freedom in the interests of civilized progress." On March 21, 1981, the radical environmental group Earth First! staged an anti-dam protest by unfurling a 300-foot (91 m) tapered black sheet of plastic down the face of the dam, making it appear as if a gigantic crack had appeared in the structure – a direct re-enactment of a scene from Abbey's book. Authorities were unable to find the individuals responsible.

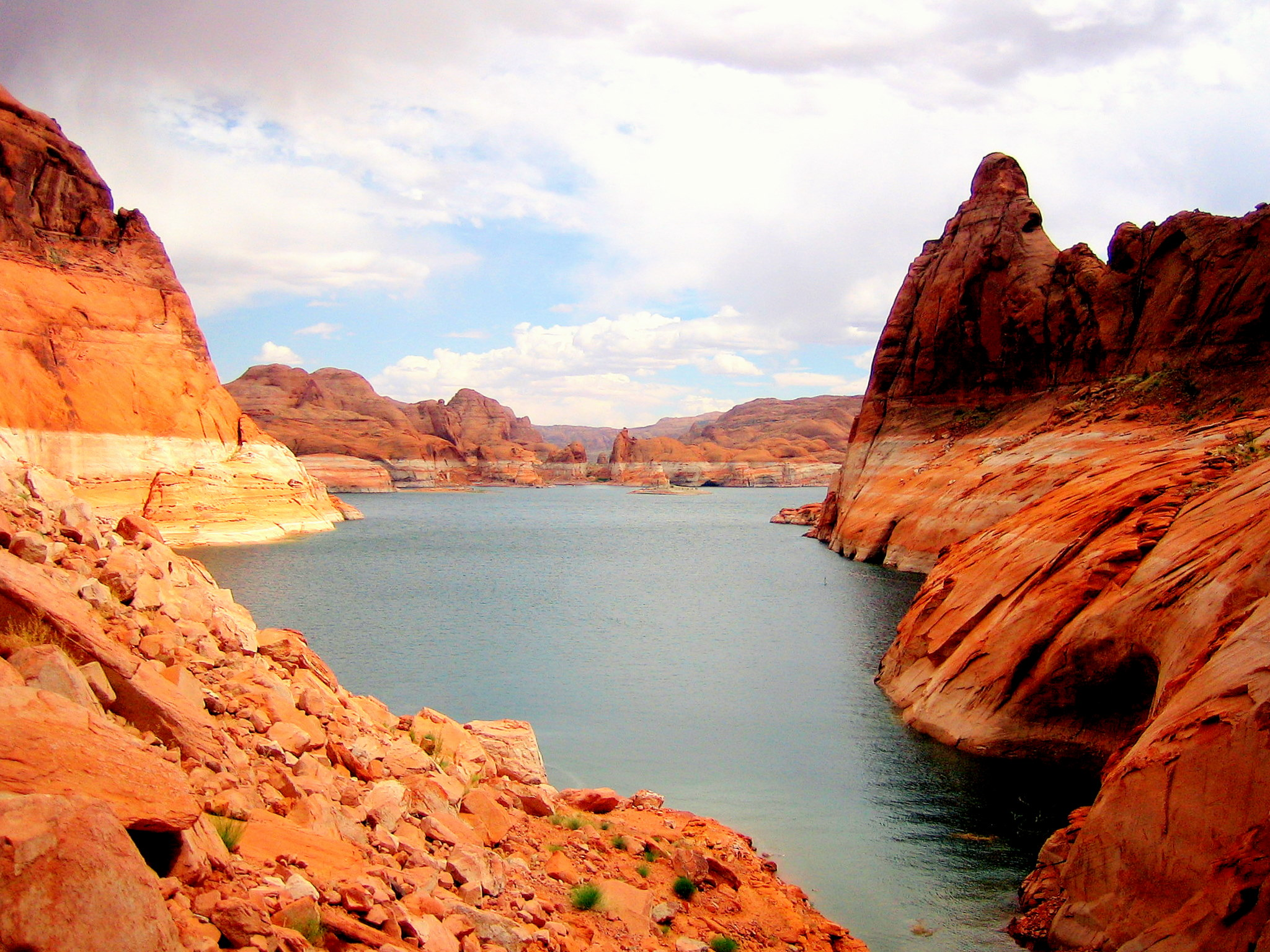
Low water levels on Lake Powell in April 2006, seen from Hole in the Rock. The water is 107 feet (33 m) below the top of the "bathtub ring" along the reservoir shore.

In his comprehensive history of western water development, Cadillac Desert (1986), Marc Reisner criticized the political forces that resulted in Glen Canyon and hundreds of other dams being built in the 1960s and 1970s. Many of these projects had dubious economic justifications and hidden environmental costs, but the government agencies that built them – namely the Bureau of Reclamation and the U.S. Army Corps of Engineers – were more interested in maintaining their size and influence. Reisner writes that "in the West, it is said, water flows uphill towards money."

In a 2011 interview, Floyd Dominy, the Reclamation Commissioner who had spearheaded the Colorado River Storage Project, maintained USBR's stance on the benefits of the dam project. Although Lake Powell loses water to evaporation and leakage, it continues to serve an important function capturing runoff during wet years, as "insurance" for droughts. During the 2000–2004 Colorado River drought, when the basin experienced its lowest five-year runoff on record, Lake Mead would likely have gone dry and the Lower Basin experienced massive cuts, were it not for releases from Lake Powell.

Lake Powell and Lake Mead are currently operated under an "equalization" policy that governs releases from Glen Canyon Dam. In order to maintain hydropower generation at both Glen Canyon and Hoover Dams, the lakes must be kept at approximately the same level. By spreading out the water, evaporation is greatly increased. Since the year 2000, Lake Mead has steadily declined toward the critical level at which a shortage would be declared for the Lower Basin states. A plan called "Fill Mead First", which would drain Lake Powell in order to refill Lake Mead, has gained traction in recent years. Glen Canyon Dam would remain in place (as total removal of the structure would be prohibitively expensive), but would only store water in wet seasons when runoff exceeds the capacity of Lake Mead to hold it.

Much of the opposition to this plan is along political lines: Lake Powell is legally considered the Upper Basin's water, and Lake Mead belongs to the Lower Basin. The Friends of Lake Powell have called this an attempt to steal water from the Upper Basin, to avoid a shortage in the Lower Basin. The Upper Basin has released 107% of its obligation from Lake Powell since 2000; (Note: The annual water release requirement from Glen Canyon Dam is 8.23 million acre-feet (10.15 km^{3}); the average release between 2000 and 2015 was 8.83 million acre-feet (10.89 km^{3}), as measured at the U.S. Geological Survey stream gage at Lee's Ferry.) therefore, falling levels in Lake Mead are a result of water overuse and waste in the Lower Basin states – a "structural deficit". There are also arguments for storing water in Powell: Lake Mead, with its much lower elevation and hotter climate, has a considerably greater evaporation rate than Lake Powell. In addition, a 1983 study by Larry J. Paulson of the University of Nevada showed that the cold water discharge from Glen Canyon Dam has led to a significant reduction of the water temperature, and thus evaporation, from Lake Mead.

== Design ==
=== Dam and spillways ===
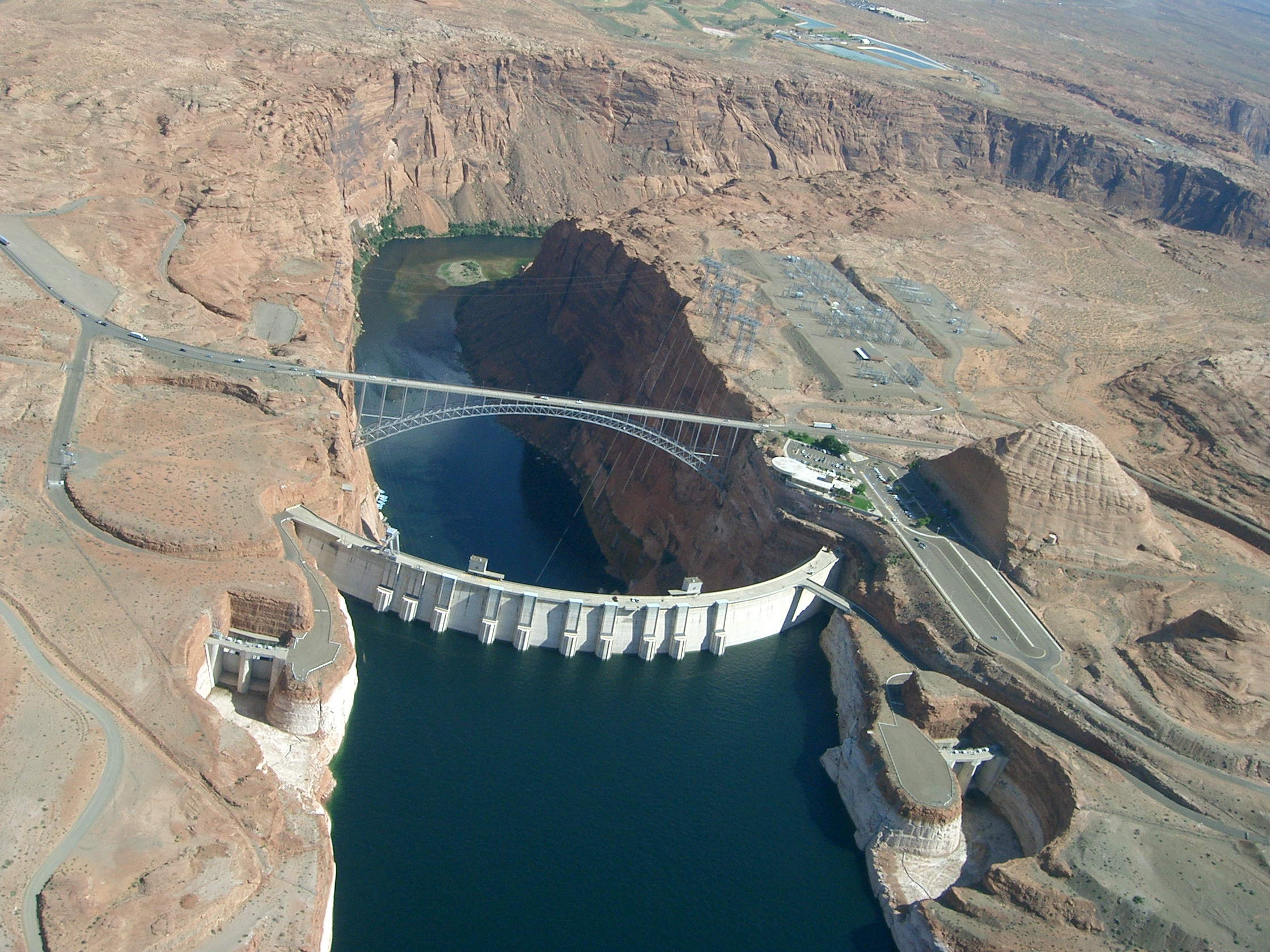
An aerial view of Glen Canyon Dam from upstream, showing the spillways to lower left and right, the Glen Canyon Bridge and the electric switchyard to the right of the bridge.

Glen Canyon's overall design was based on that of Hoover Dam – a massive concrete arch-gravity structure anchored in solid bedrock – with several significant changes. The engineers wanted the dam to rely predominantly on its arch shape to carry the tremendous pressure of the impounded water into the canyon walls instead of depending on the sheer weight of the structure to hold the reservoir back, as had been done at Hoover. The foundation rock at Glen Canyon consists of porous sandstone prone to spalling, in contrast to the stronger granite at the Hoover Dam site, forcing the Glen Canyon design to follow more conservative lines by greatly thickening the abutments, thus increasing the surface area through which the weight of dam and reservoir would be transmitted to the rock and relieving the pressure on the highly breakable cliffs.

The Glen Canyon Dam is 710 feet (220 m) high from the foundations and stands 583 feet (178 m) above the Colorado River. The crest of the dam is 1,560 feet (480 m) long and 25 feet (7.6 m) wide, while the maximum thickness of the base is 300 feet (91 m). The elevation at the crest is 3,715 feet (1,132 m), and the elevation of the Colorado River below the dam is 3,132 feet (955 m). In total, the dam contains 5,370,000 cubic yards (4,110,000 m^{3}) of concrete and 28,900,000 pounds (13,100,000 kg) of reinforcing steel. The hydroelectric power station and river outlet works are located at the foot of the dam. The outlet works consist of four 96-inch (240 cm) diameter pipes, each controlled by a ring gate and hollow-jet valve. The discharge capacity of the river outlet works is 15,000 cubic feet per second (420 m^{3}/s).

The two spillway tunnels are excavated through the canyon walls on each side of the dam. Twin radial gates, each 40 feet (12 m) wide and 52.5 feet (16.0 m) high, control the flow of water into the spillways. Together, the spillways can pass up to 208,000 cubic feet per second (5,900 m^{3}/s). The tunnels required 132,000 cubic yards (101,000 m^{3}) of excavation and another 110,000 cubic yards (84,000 m^{3}) of concrete lining. The circular, concrete-lined spillway tunnels plunge at a 55-degree angle, reducing in diameter from 48 to 41 feet (15 to 12 m), until they intersect with the old river diversion tunnels at sharp elbow joints before returning to the Colorado River. This was done as a cost-saving measure, but resulted in the destruction of both spillways during the 1983 flood releases. The repairs, in which air slots were installed to prevent cavitation shock waves, cost about $15 million.

=== Water storage and distribution ===
With a capacity of 25,160,000 acre-feet (31.03 km^{3}), Lake Powell is the second largest man-made lake in the United States by total water capacity (after only Lake Mead), extending 186 miles (299 km) upstream through the canyons of Arizona and Utah. The lake covers 161,390 acres (65,310 ha) at its full pool elevation of 3,700 feet (1,100 m). The active, or useful capacity is 20.876 million acre-feet (25.750 km^{3}). The minimum water level required for power generation is 3,490 feet (1,060 m), corresponding to storage of 4.0 million acre-feet (4.9 km^{3}), and the "dead pool", the lowest point at which water can be released through the dam, is 3,370 feet (1,030 m) with storage of 1.9 million acre-feet (2.3 km^{3}). When Glen Canyon Dam was first built, the reservoir capacity was estimated at 28.04 million acre-feet (34.59 km^{3}), but some of this has since been lost to siltation. Because of the hundreds of bays and sinuous side canyons, including those formed by the San Juan, Escalante and Dirty Devil Rivers, Lake Powell has an exceptionally long shoreline for a lake of its size – about 1,960 miles (3,150 km) at full pool, longer than the entire west coast of the continental United States.

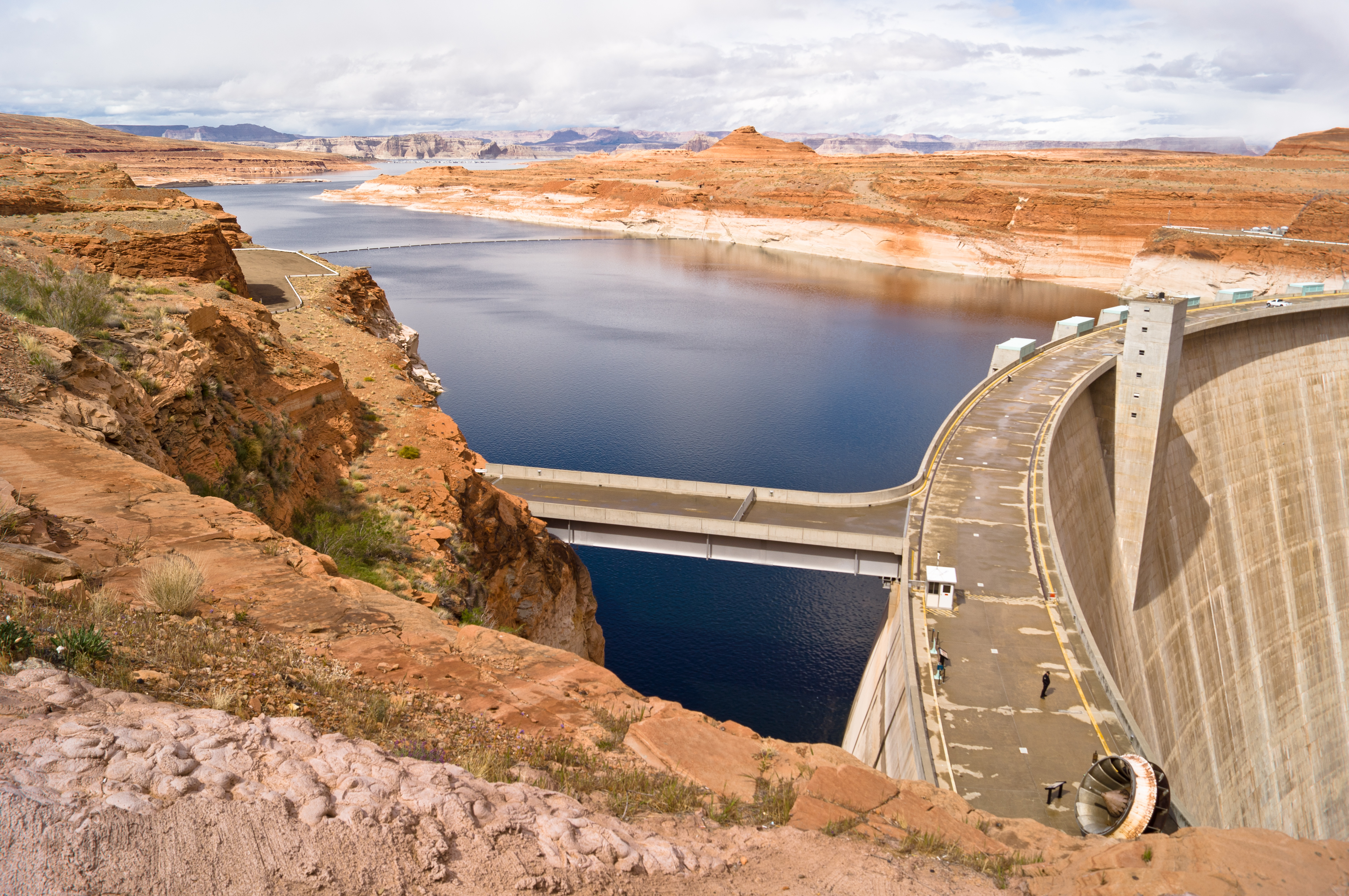
Glen Canyon Dam and Lake Powell

Glen Canyon Dam's most vital purpose is to provide storage to ensure enough water flows from the Upper Colorado River Basin to the lower, especially in drought years. The 1922 Colorado River Compact requires annual delivery of 7.5 million acre-feet (9.3 km^{3}) to the Lower Basin states of Arizona, California and Nevada; the 1944 treaty with Mexico obligates the U.S. to allow at least 1.5 million acre-feet (1.9 km^{3}) for use in the Mexican states of Baja California and Sonora. Glen Canyon Dam must supply at least 8.23 million acre-feet (10.15 km^{3}) of this water; the remaining 770,000 acre-feet (0.95 km^{3}) comes from other tributaries of the Colorado River. The required release from Glen Canyon is averaged over a 10-year period, so releases in each year may be higher or lower depending on the amount of runoff. In wetter years, the Bureau of Reclamation may decide to release extra water from Glen Canyon Dam if the level of Lake Powell exceeds the "equalization tier", an elevation determined by the difference in storage between Lake Powell and Lake Mead.

Most of Lake Powell's inflow originates as summer snowmelt from the Rocky Mountains of Colorado, Utah and Wyoming. Releases are made over a water year of October 1–September 30, since the annual snowpack begins to accumulate in late autumn. On April 1 of each year, the Bureau of Reclamation releases its official forecast of the April–July (snowmelt season) runoff, and adjusts releases from Glen Canyon Dam accordingly to maintain Lake Powell at a safe level. An accurate forecast is vital to prevent uncontrolled spilling, which would waste water that could have been used for power generation. Although the snowpack typically reaches its peak and begins to melt in April, the picture can occasionally change unexpectedly and dramatically – either due to a hot and dry spring that evaporates snow before it can melt, or an extremely wet spring as occurred in May 1983. After the near disaster in 1983, the USBR has maintained a minimum of 2.4 million acre-feet (3.0 km^{3}) of flood-storage space in Lake Powell at the beginning of each year, to guard against unanticipated high runoff.

=== 21st century drought ===
In the 21st century, the water level of Lake Powell has declined from near maximum capacity to within 30 feet (9.1 m) of the minimum level needed for Glen Canyon Dam to generate electricity.

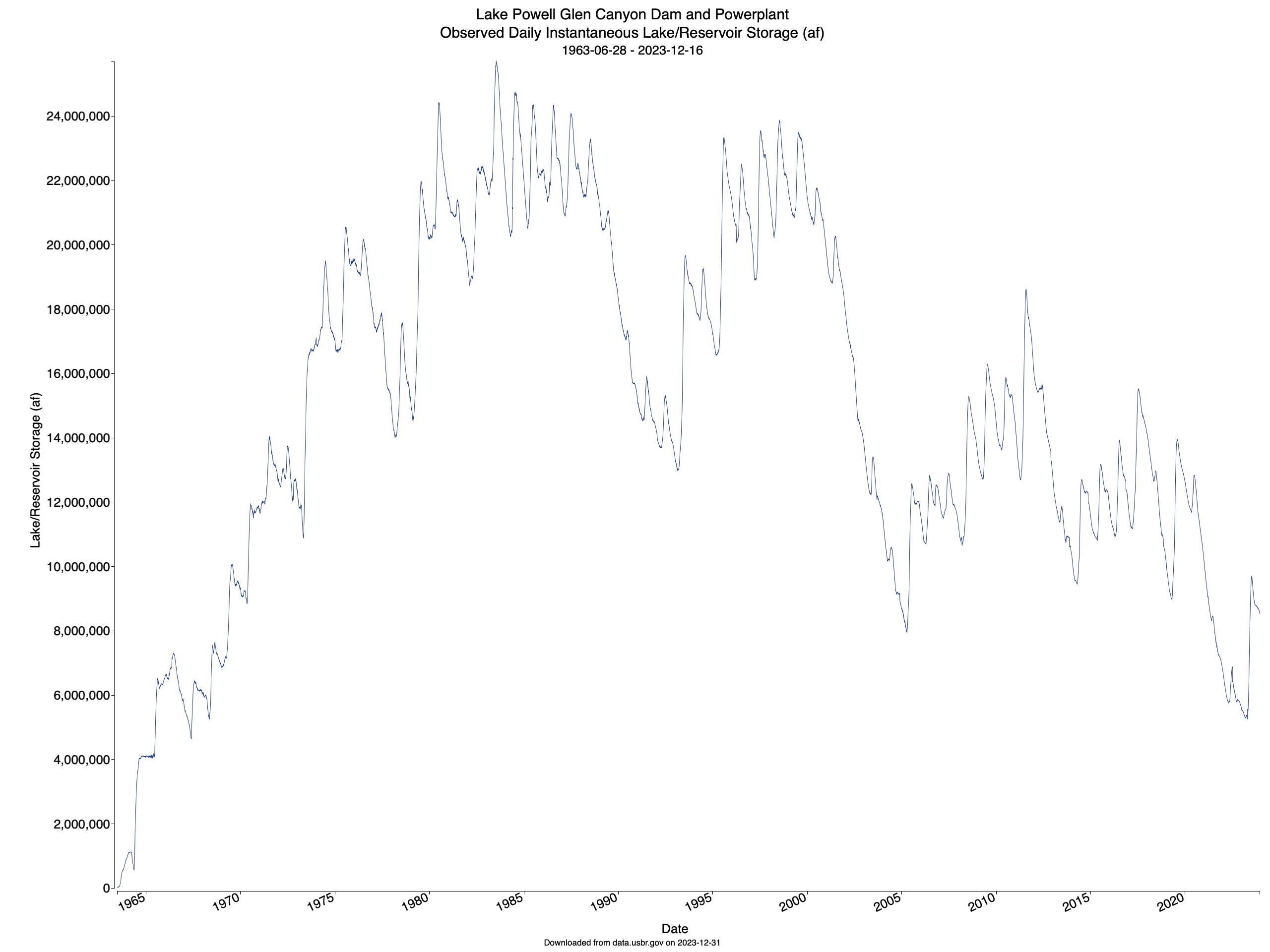
Chart showing daily water volume observations for Lake Powell, from Jun 28, 1963 to December 16, 2023

Lake Powell surface area shrinkage

Colorado River flows have been below average since 2000 as a result of the southwestern North American megadrought, leading to lower lake levels. In winter 2005 (before the spring run-off) the lake reached its then-lowest level since filling, an elevation of 3,555.10 feet (1,083.59 m) above sea level, which was approximately 150 feet (46 m) below full pool. After 2005, the lake level slowly rebounded, although it has not filled completely since then. Summer 2011 saw the third largest June and the second largest July runoff since the closure of Glen Canyon Dam, and the water level peaked at nearly 3,661 feet (1,116 m), 77 percent of capacity, on July 30. Water years 2012 and 2013 were, respectively, the third and fourth-lowest runoff years recorded on the Colorado River. By April 9, 2014, the lake level had fallen to 3,574.31 feet (1,089.45 m), largely erasing the gains made in 2011.

Colorado River levels returned to normal during water years 2014 and 2015 (pushing the lake to 3,606 feet (1,099 m) by the end of water year 2015. The Bureau of Reclamation in 2014 reduced the Lake Powell release from 8.23 to 7.48 million acre-feet, for the first time since the lake filled in 1980. This was done due to the "equalization" guideline which stipulates that an approximately equal amount of water must be retained in both Lake Powell and Lake Mead, in order to preserve hydro-power generation capacity at both lakes. This resulted in Lake Mead declining to the lowest level on record since the 1930s.

Long-term water level decline continued, forcing an emergency release of water from the Flaming Gorge Reservoir in July 2021, and by April 22, 2022 Lake Powell was at 3,522.24 feet (1,073.58 m) in elevation – just 22.88% of capacity. This marked the lowest water level for Lake Powell since it was filled in 1963, but that water level record was broken a year later, on April 13, 2023, when the water level dropped to 3,519.92 feet. Peer-reviewed studies indicate that storing water in Lake Mead rather than in Lake Powell would yield a savings of 300,000 acre feet of water or more per year, leading to calls by environmentalists to drain Lake Powell and restore Glen Canyon to its natural, free-flowing state.

=== Power generation ===
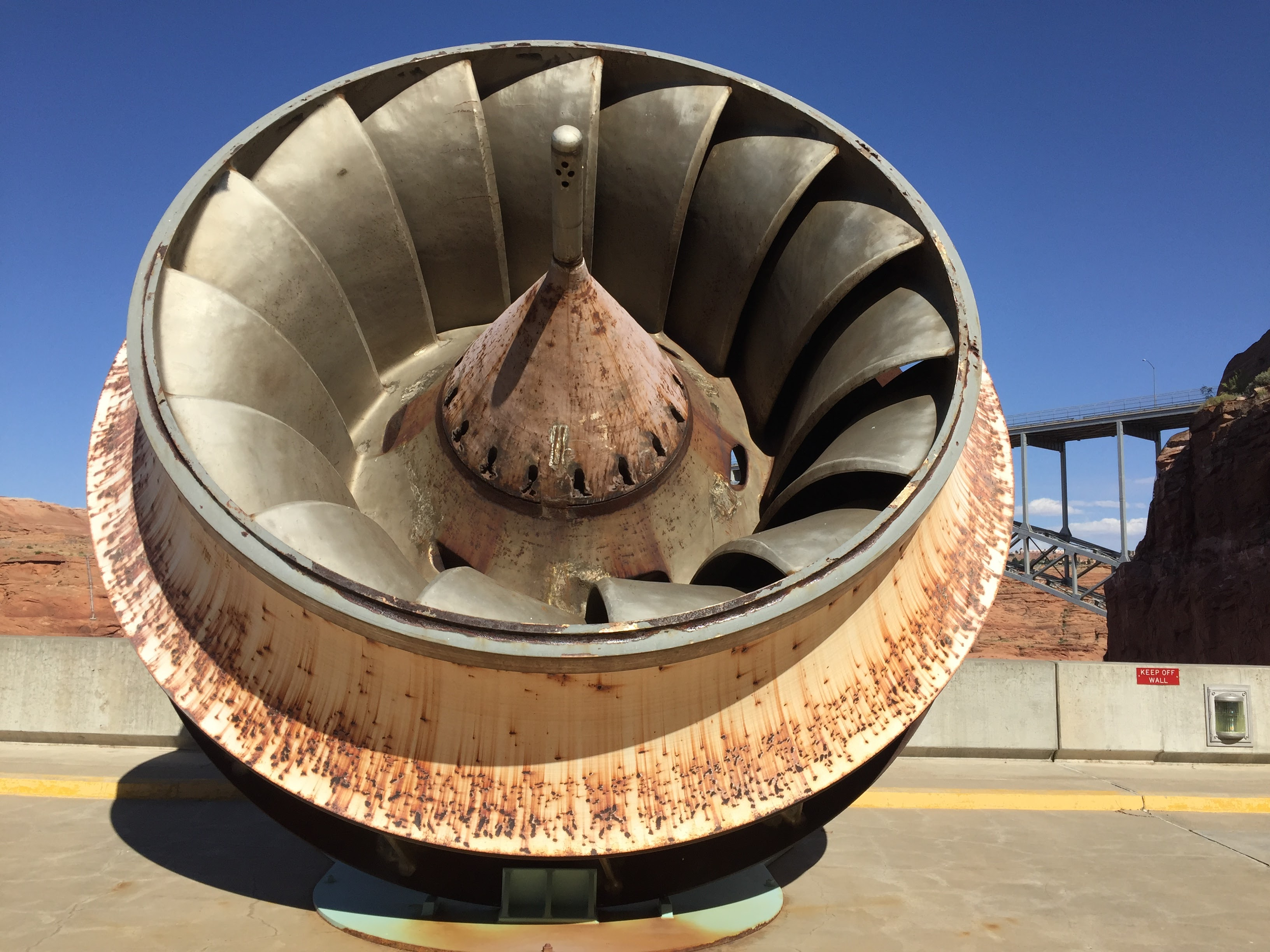
Francis turbine runner on display

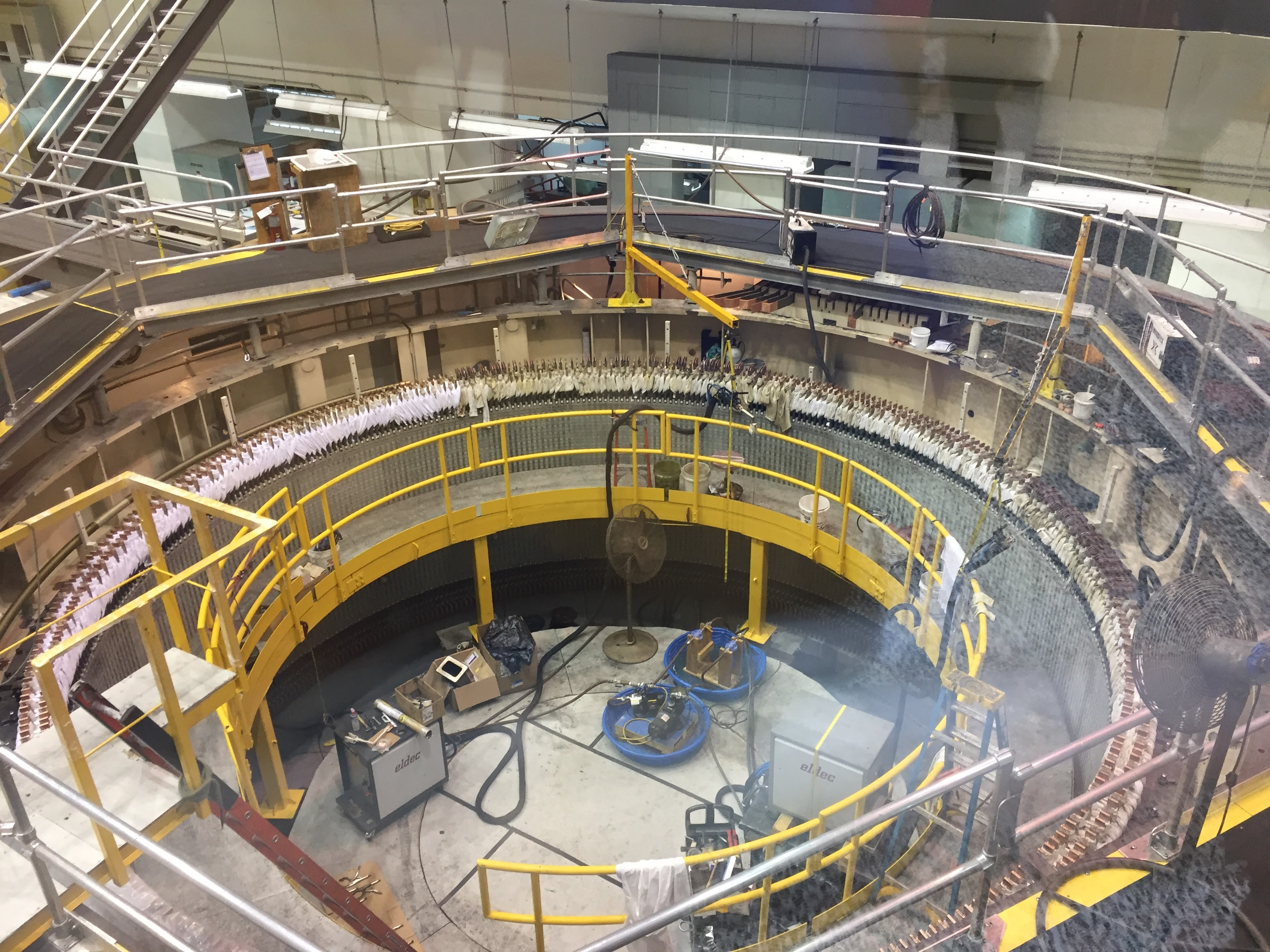
A generator being repaired with rotor removed

The other principal goal of Glen Canyon Dam is hydroelectricity generation. It is the second-biggest producer of hydroelectric power in the Southwestern United States, after Hoover Dam. Revenues derived from power sales were integral in paying off the bonds used to build the dam and have also been used to fund other Bureau of Reclamation projects, including environmental restoration programs in the Grand Canyon and elsewhere along the Colorado River. For this reason, it has long been known as a "cash register" dam. The dam also serves as a primary peaking power plant and black start power source for the Southwest electrical grid. The power plant has a total capacity of 1,320 megawatts from eight 165,000 kilowatt generators. Each generator is driven by a 254,000 horsepower vertical-axis Francis turbine. The gross hydraulic head is 510 feet (160 m). The units were installed between September 1964 and February 1966 at an original rating of 950 megawatts; an upgrade project between 1985 and 1997 brought it to its present capacity.

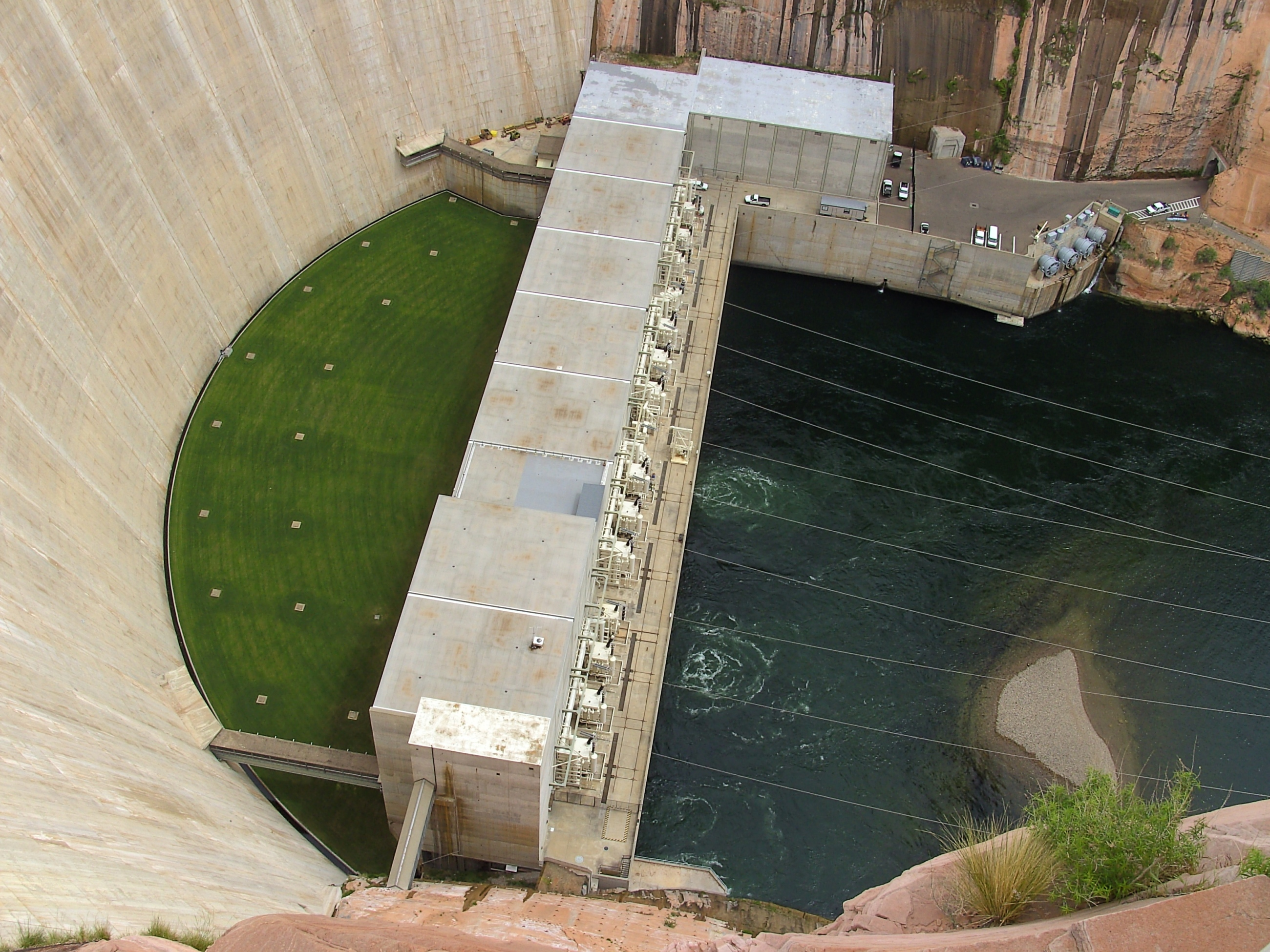
View of the power plant and grass lawn

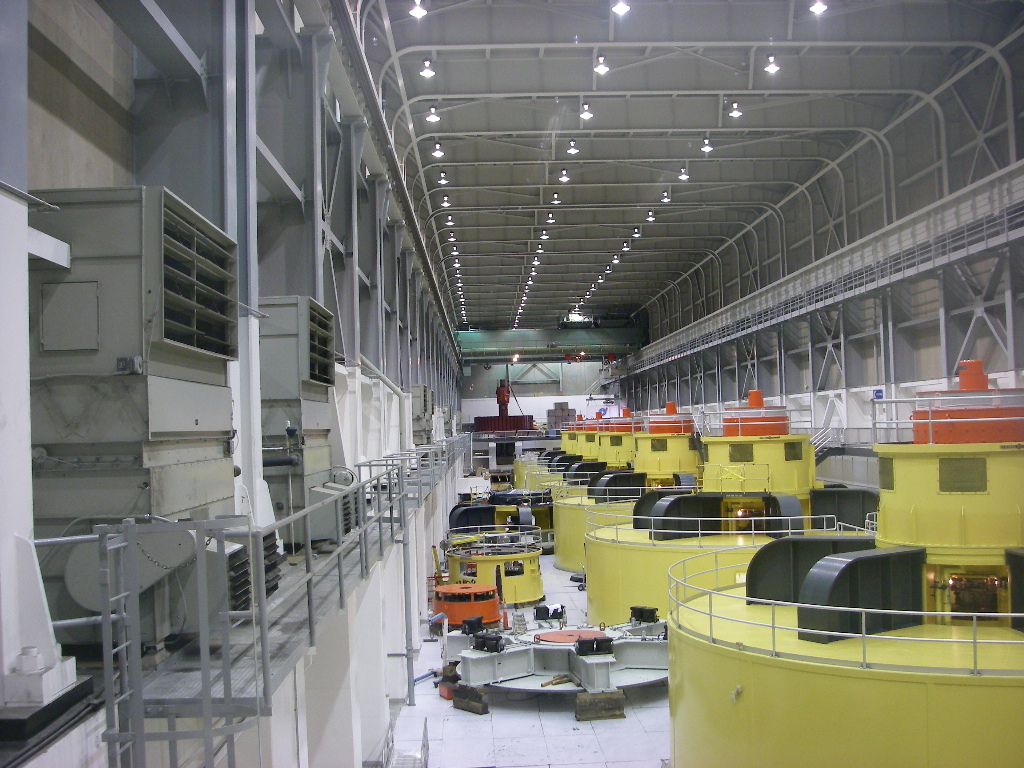
Inside the turbine hall at the Glen Canyon Power Plant

Because of fluctuating demands on the electrical grid, the dam release into the Colorado River rises and falls dramatically on a daily basis. After the dam was completed in 1964, there were few restrictions on hydro-power generation. The minimum dam release was set at a meager 1,000 cubic feet per second (28 m^{3}/s) (increased to 3,000 cubic feet per second (85 m^{3}/s) during the summer whitewater rafting season), with a maximum of 31,500 cubic feet per second (890 m^{3}/s) during peak times; to respond to changing power demands, river flows could double or even triple in the space of an hour. This caused severe erosion of the Colorado River banks downstream, damaging habitat for native fish and causing danger for boaters, who could get stuck whenever the river flow dropped too quickly. In 1990 temporary restrictions were put in place on dam operations, before the release of a final environmental impact statement (EIS).

The EIS completed March 21, 1995 cemented some restrictions on dam operations, limiting the maximum power release to 25,000 cubic feet per second (710 m^{3}/s), the maximum hourly "ramp-up" (increase in river flow) to 4,000 cubic feet per second (110 m^{3}/s), and the maximum "ramp-down" to 1,500 cubic feet per second (42 m^{3}/s). The minimum dam release was set to 8,000 cubic feet per second (230 m^{3}/s) during the day and 5,000 cubic feet per second (140 m^{3}/s) at night. Flood control releases are allowed to go higher, but must remain constant for the entire month. Because these criteria limit the flexibility of Glen Canyon Dam to meet grid demands, economic losses for the period 1997–2005 were estimated at $38 million to $58 million per year.

Between 1980 and 2013, Glen Canyon Dam generated an average of 4,717 gigawatt hours (GWh) per year, enough for about 400,000 homes. The highest was 8,703 GWh in 1984, and the lowest was 3,299 GWh in 2005. Power generation is affected not only by the volume of water passing through the dam, but also the depth of water in the reservoir, as a higher water level means more pressure (head) on the turbines. Hydropower generated at Glen Canyon serves about 5 million people in Arizona, Colorado, Nevada, New Mexico, Utah and Wyoming, and is sold to utilities in these states as 20-year contracts. Power sales have been managed by the Western Area Power Administration since 1977. Glen Canyon Dam generates enough power to offset 6.7 billion pounds (3 billion kg) of carbon dioxide emissions each year. Drought conditions in the 21st century have reduced the amount of hydropower available from Glen Canyon Dam.

An unusual feature of the Glen Canyon power plant is the 86,000 square feet (8,000 m^{2}) Kentucky bluegrass lawn occupying the crescent between the dam and hydroelectric plant. At the time of construction in 1964, the steel penstocks feeding water to the power plant were exposed and they experienced severe vibration when in use. Engineers decided to bury them in soil to act as a buffer against the potentially damaging vibrations. The grass was later planted to prevent the dirt from getting blown away – but also provides a mild cooling effect through evapotranspiration, reducing temperatures inside the power plant.

== Environmental issues ==
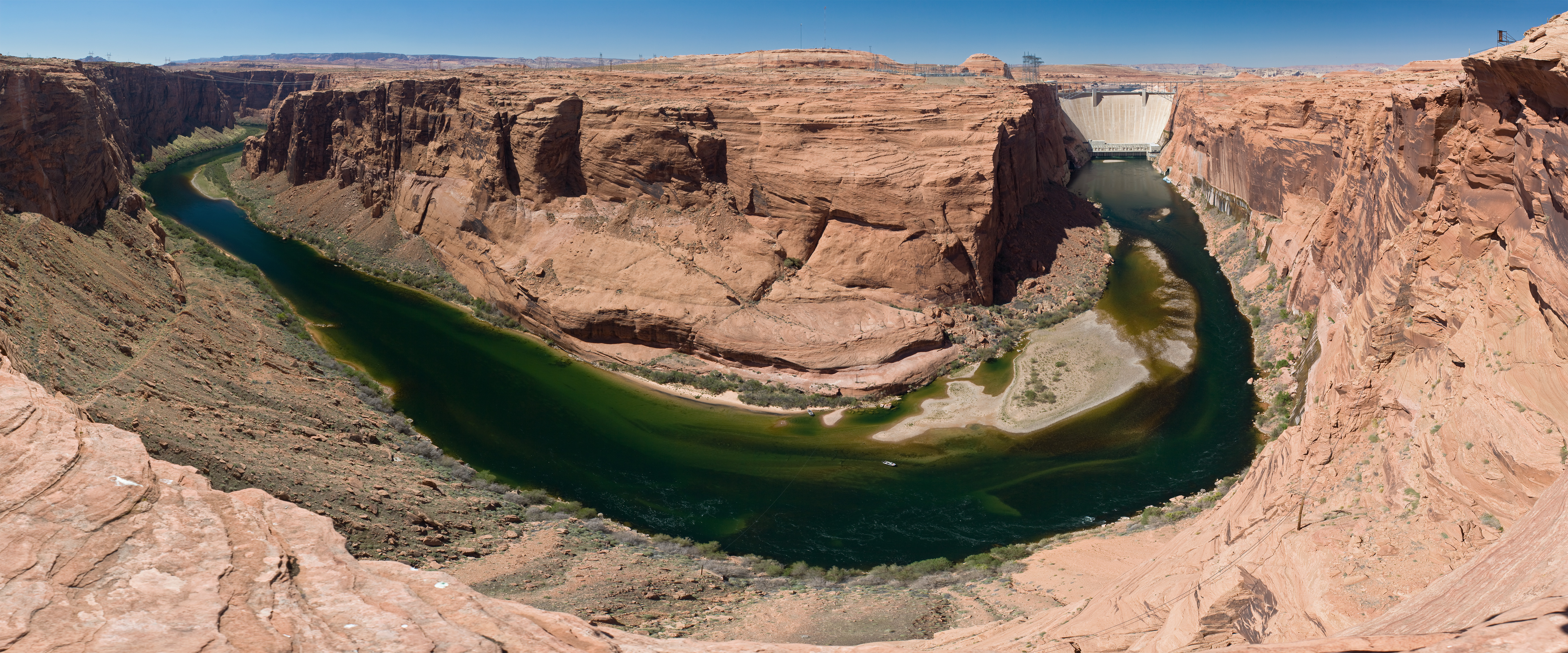
View of the Colorado immediately downstream of Glen Canyon Dam (right). The green, clear water is caused by the dam trapping sediment, which would naturally cause the river to have a reddish-brown color.

Because of its tremendous ecological effect on the Colorado River, the Glen Canyon Dam has been subject to decades of criticism from the environmental movement. Being located in a high desert climate amid porous geology, Lake Powell causes huge evaporation and seepage losses. The Glen Canyon Institute estimates that 860,000 acre-feet (1.06 km^{3}) is lost from the reservoir in an average year. This amounts to 6 percent of the Colorado River's flow, an increasingly valuable amount of water in an arid land for both humans and the animals and plants that live along the river. (This amount greatly decreases when Lake Powell is low; with the reservoir about half full in water year 2015, evaporation was 368,000 acre-feet (0.454 km^{3}).)

Like all dams, Glen Canyon traps sediment (silt), but because the Colorado is an especially muddy river, the dam has posed even more visible consequences for the river within the Grand Canyon. About 100 million US tons (90,700,000 metric tons) of sediment are trapped behind the dam annually, equal to about 30,000 dump truck loads per day. Because of the dam, sediment deposited by the Colorado and its tributaries is slowly filling up the canyon, and projections put the useful life of the reservoir at 300 to 700 years. If no action is taken such as dredging or sediment sluicing, in a few hundred years, sediment deposits will begin to build up at the foot of the dam and will gradually block the different outlets, reducing the dam's capacity to store and release water. Thus, it would become more difficult to maintain the required release of 8.23 million acre-feet (10.15 km^{3}) below the dam. The Colorado River would reduce to a trickle in dry seasons as it naturally did before the dam was built, potentially compromising the water supply of the Lower Basin states.

The Colorado through Grand Canyon now lacks the source of sediment it needs to build sandbars and islands, and these natural fluvial formations within the canyon have now suffered severe damage from erosion. The floods that once scoured the river each year are now contained behind the dam except in extraordinary cases such as 1983–84; the lack of floods has promoted vegetation encroachment which not only has considerably changed the riparian zone environment but has created problems for tourism, as hikers and boaters often cannot find good spots to camp due to overgrowth. Flood control has also caused an inability of the river to carry away the rockslides that are common along the canyons, leading to the creation of incrementally dangerous rapids that pose a hazard to fish and boaters alike. Before damming, the Colorado commonly reached flows of more than 100,000 cubic feet per second (2,800 m^{3}/s) during the spring; this has been limited to less than 25,000 cubic feet per second (710 m^{3}/s) most years with few exceptions.

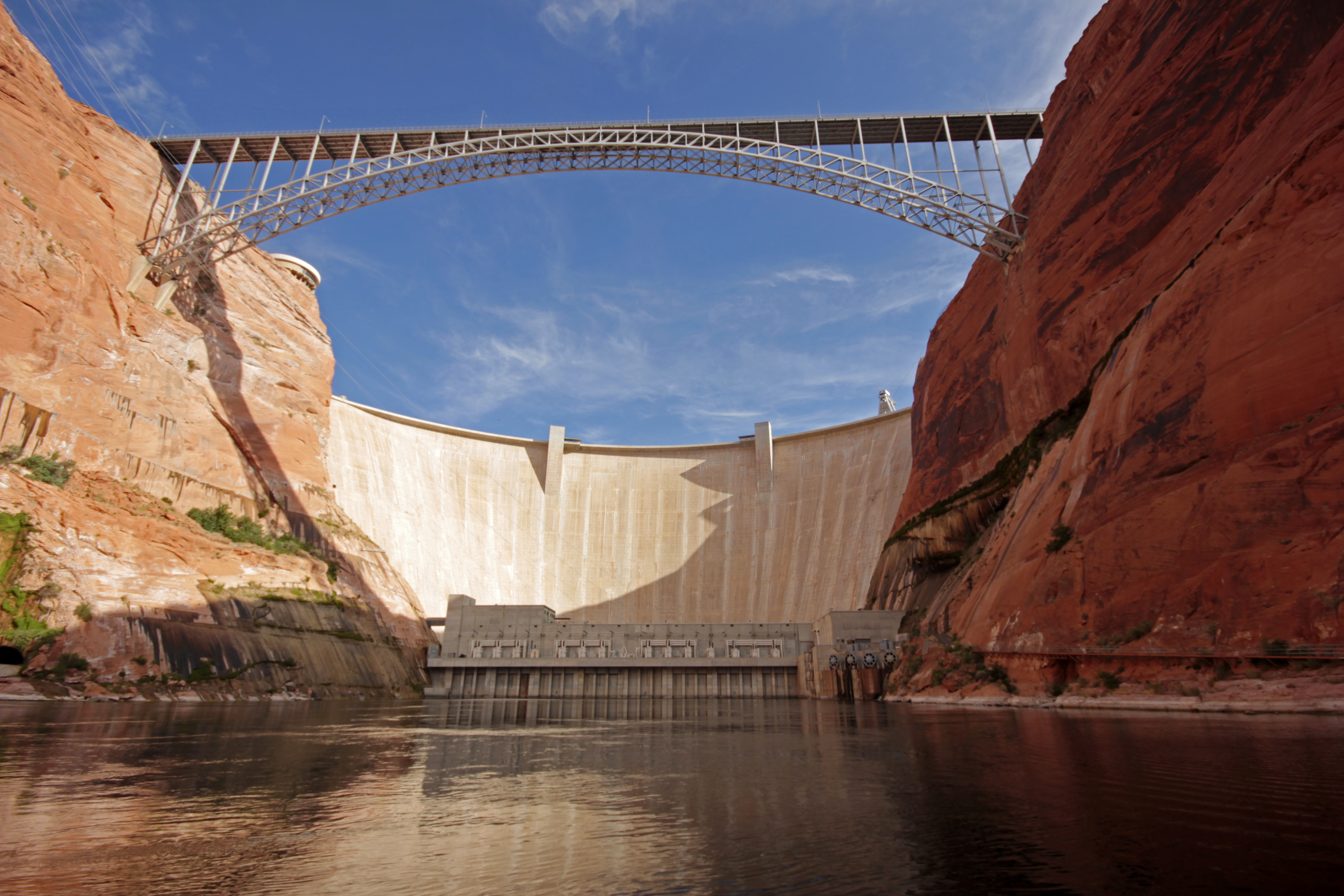
The Colorado River is now much calmer and colder than before the dam was built.

Before the dam was built, Colorado River temperatures ranged from over 80 °F (27 °C) in the heat of summer to just above freezing in winter. Today, water released by Glen Canyon is a consistent 46 °F (8 °C) throughout the year due to a thermal mass effect in Lake Powell. The water typically released from hundreds of feet below the lake surface through the penstocks is insulated from temperature fluctuations by the thick layer of water above it. Nikolai Ramsey of the Grand Canyon Trust describes the clearer, colder river as a "death zone for native fish", such as the endemic Colorado pikeminnow and humpback chub, which are adapted to survive in warm, silty water.

According to biologist and river guide Michael P. Ghiglieri, many drowning deaths by boaters in the Grand Canyon have been caused or exacerbated by rapid hypothermia and hypothermic shock caused by entering the cold water. He further described that during the record post-dam high-flow season of 1983 (mentioned above), there was only one boating fatality in the canyon, providing a strong challenge to views that the dam, by reducing and mediating river flows, increases the safety of canyon river users. The river water temperature in 1983 was significantly higher than normal, due to a large portion of the water having come from overflows of warmer surface water over the spillways of Glen Canyon Dam, rather than the colder lower levels which feed the penstocks.

Glen Canyon Dam has also impacted the Colorado River well downstream of the Grand Canyon. When the gates of the dam were closed in 1963, the resulting reductions in river flow effectively dried up the Colorado River Delta, the large estuary formed by the Colorado River at the Gulf of California (Sea of Cortez) in Mexico. Prior to the completion of Glen Canyon Dam, about 4 to 6 million acre-feet (4.9 to 7.4 km^{3}) reached the delta each year, despite heavy water use in California and Arizona. Because Glen Canyon Dam made possible an increased utilization of water from the Colorado River system, not enough water is left to flow to the delta in a normal year, and about 3,000 square miles (7,800 km^{2}) of ecologically productive wetlands have disappeared. In 2014 an intentional "pulse flow" was released into the delta to restore some of these wetlands; the viability of such flows have been controversial, considering the already high demand for Colorado River water.

== Restoration efforts ==
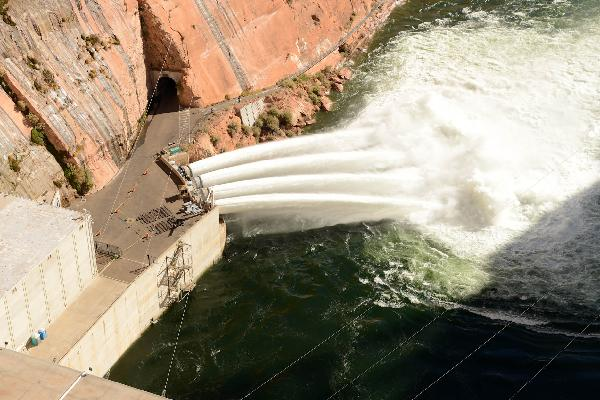
River outlet works are open during high flow experiment in December 2012.

On March 26, 1996, the penstocks and two of the outlet works' bypass tubes at Glen Canyon Dam were opened to maximum capacity, causing a flood of 45,000 cubic feet per second (1,300 m^{3}/s) to move down the Colorado River. This was the first of the Glen Canyon Adaptive Management Program "high flow experiments", a controlled effort to assist the recovery of the damaged riverine ecosystem by mimicking the floods that once swept through the canyons each spring. The flow appeared to have scoured clean numerous pockets of encroaching vegetation, carried away rockslides that had become dangerous to boaters, and rearranged sand and gravel bars along the river, and was initially believed to be an environmental success. However, in the following months it was discovered that the initial results were misleading.

Crews working in the Grand Canyon after the 1996 experiment found that the offensive vegetation had not been carried away as previously thought – only buried – and had mostly recovered within six months. The surface area of sandbars had been increased, but much of the material had been eroded from the submerged portions of the bars and deposited on top, making them unstable, rather than scoured from the riverbed as hoped. Subsequent releases in 2004, 2008, 2012, and 2014 were timed to take advantage of summer monsoon storms, and redistribute sediment carried into the Grand Canyon by the Paria and Little Colorado Rivers. The high-flow experiments do not change the total amount of water outflow from Lake Powell on an annual basis, but as a consequence hydro-electric power releases during the rest of the year must be reduced. Some organizations, such as Living Rivers, continue to believe that the dam has too large and severe of an effect on the river's ecology to make restoration efforts worthwhile.

== Recreation ==
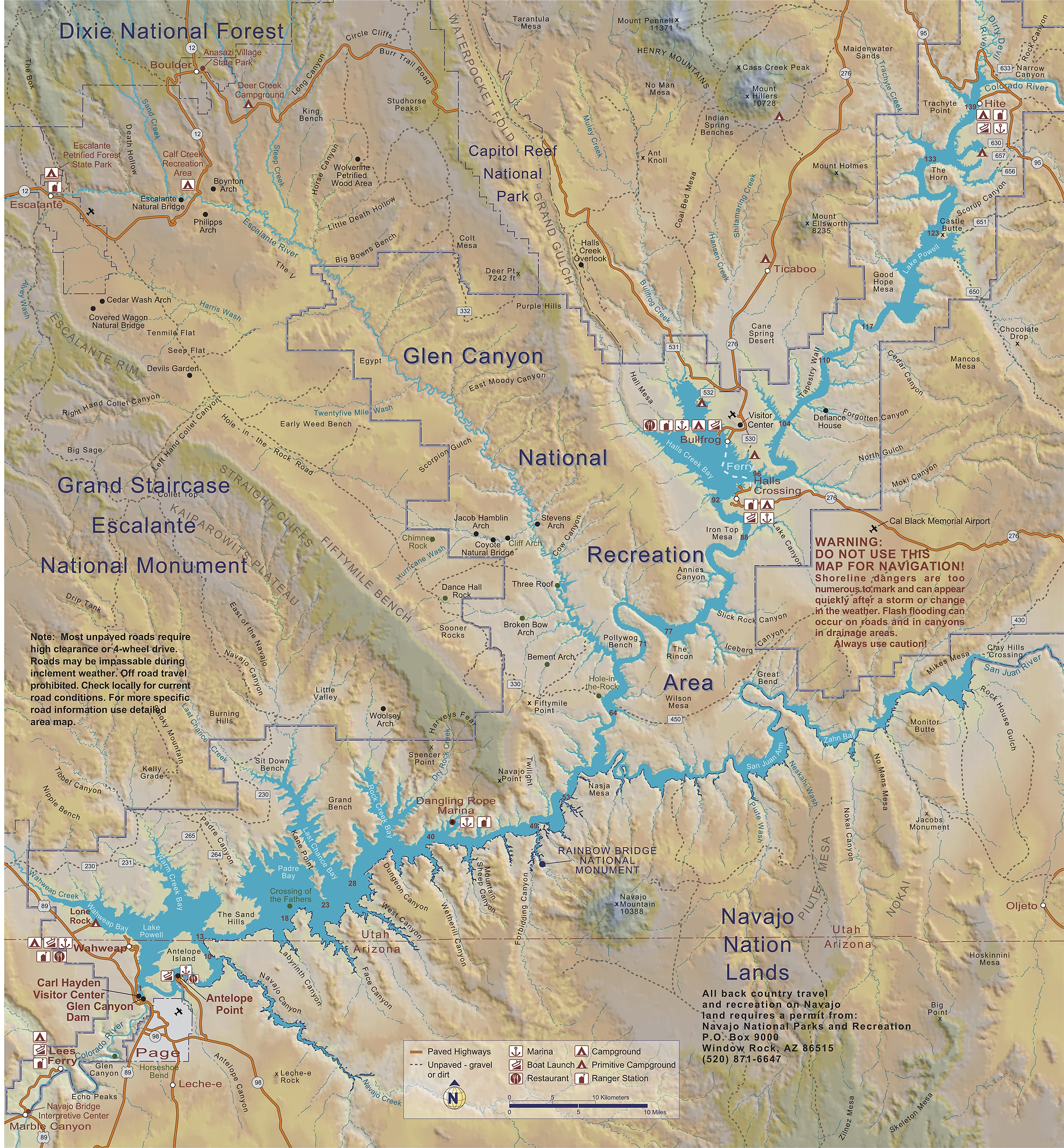
Map of Lake Powell and the Glen Canyon NRA

According to the U.S. National Park Service, Lake Powell is "widely recognized by boating enthusiasts as one of the premier water-based recreation destinations in the world." Despite its remote location, the 1,250,000-acre (510,000 ha) Glen Canyon National Recreation Area, which surrounds the reservoir, receives more than three million visitors annually. Activities include boating, fishing, waterskiing, jet-skiing, swimming and hiking. Prepared campgrounds can be found at each marina, but many visitors choose to rent a houseboat or bring their own camping equipment, find a private spot somewhere in the canyons, and make their own camp (there are no restrictions on where visitors can stay). About 85,000 people per year travel via boat to Rainbow Bridge in Utah, a large natural arch once very hard to access, but now easily reachable because one of the arms of the reservoir extends near it.

Because most of the lake is surrounded by steep sandstone walls, access is limited to developed marinas. The heavily used Wahweap and Antelope Point Marinas are located in Arizona, close to Page. Two other marinas at Halls Crossing and Bullfrog are located further upstream in Utah. The Hite Marina, located at the upper end of the reservoir near the Hite Crossing Bridge, is now disused since the water level is usually too low for boats to launch there. Other facilities at Dangling Rope and Rainbow Bridge are accessible only by boat. Aside from the bridges at either end of the lake, a car-and-passenger ferry between Halls Crossing and Bullfrog is the only way for vehicles to cross Lake Powell.

More than 500,000 people tour the Carl Hayden Visitor Center at Glen Canyon Dam each year. The Bureau of Reclamation provides guided tours of the dam; stringent security measures have been in place since the September 11 attacks. The base of the dam can also be reached via boat from Lee's Ferry. Because of the cold, clear water released from Lake Powell, the stretch of the Colorado River between Glen Canyon Dam and Lee's Ferry has become an excellent rainbow trout fishery. Trout are not native to the Colorado River system; they were stocked in the river below Glen Canyon Dam after the dam was built. Other non-native fish such as smallmouth bass, striped bass, largemouth bass and black crappie were planted in Lake Powell to provide sport fishing opportunities.

Like many U.S. lakes and reservoirs, Lake Powell has an active problem with zebra and quagga mussels, invasive bivalve species originating in eastern Europe. Mussels are most commonly transferred from lake to lake attached to the hulls, and inside the bilge area of boats. Lake users are required by law to clean, drain and dry their vessels, both before and after taking a trip to Lake Powell. Mussel infestations tend to clog the hydroelectric intakes at the Glen Canyon Dam, as well as the propellers and exhaust pipes of boats, requiring expensive de-contamination. Their impact on the lake ecology appears to be low, or even beneficial due to their providing a food source for fish.

== See also ==
- List of tallest dams
- List of dams and reservoirs in the United States
  - List of the tallest dams in the United States
  - List of largest reservoirs in the United States
- List of dams in the Colorado River system
- Black Mesa and Lake Powell Railroad
- Colorado Plateau
- Katie Lee, an activist against the dam
- Navajo Generating Station
