= Floyd Dominy =

American government official (1909–2010)

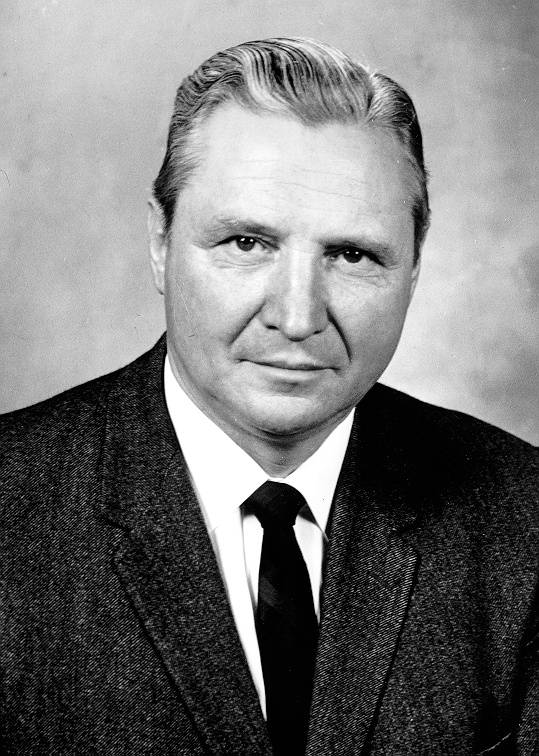
Floyd Dominy

Floyd Elgin Dominy (December 24, 1909 Adams County, Nebraska – April 20, 2010 Boyce, Virginia) was appointed commissioner of the United States Bureau of Reclamation from May 1, 1959, to December 1, 1969, by Dwight D. Eisenhower. Dominy joined the Bureau in 1946. He was the assistant commissioner from 1957 to 1958. He was responsible for building Glen Canyon Dam and the creation of Lake Powell behind it. He died in Boyce, Virginia, where he had lived since at least 1990.

Dominy's father and grandfather were homesteaders, and his upbringing was marked by humble circumstances. He graduated from the University of Wyoming in 1933 with a degree in agricultural economics. Not long after graduation, he became a county agricultural extension agent in Campbell County, Wyoming, where his enthusiasm for dams endeared him to local farmers and ranchers.

Dominy was a strong advocate for use of the Colorado River and other water resources of the west for agriculture and development, in opposition to the growing environmental movement. He was the director of several projects like the Colorado River Storage Project, Colorado River Basin Project, Missouri River Basin Project, Columbia River Basin Project, California Central Valley Project, and the Mekong River Basin Project in Thailand.

Dominy was a main character in two non-fiction books about water management the American west: Cadillac Desert by Marc Reisner and Encounters with the Archdruid by John McPhee. McPhee arranged a whitewater rafting trip down the Colorado River with Dominy and David Brower, a prominent environmentalist and founder of Friends of the Earth, and the book highlights their opposing views of the river and its uses.
