= Game Wars =

1991 book by Marc Reisner

- First edition cover
- Author: Marc Reisner
- Language: English
- Publisher: Viking Penguin
- Publication date: 1991
- Publication place: United States
- Media type: Print (Hardback)
- Pages: 294
- ISBN: 978-0-14-008768-0

Game Wars is a 1991 non-fiction book by Marc Reisner which gives accounts of several U.S. Fish and Wildlife Service sting operations. First published in 1991, the book centers on undercover agent Dave Hall as he infiltrates groups of poachers and gathers evidence to prosecute them. The three chapters of the book focus on poaching of alligators in Louisiana, ivory in Alaska, and sacalait in the Southern United States. The book highlights the debate over whether declines in wildlife populations should be attributed to over-hunting or loss of habitat. The book also highlights and details several cases and operations that Special Agent Hall conducted along with game wardens from the Louisiana Department of Wildlife & Fisheries – Enforcement Division.

The title was reviewed in The Chicago Tribune.
