= Cadillac Desert =

1986 nonfiction book by Marc Reisner

- Cover of the 1993 Penguin Books edition
- Author: Marc Reisner
- Language: English
- Subjects: Environmentalism; Water policy
- Published: 1986 (Viking Press)
- Publication place: United States
- Pages: 582
- ISBN: 9780140104325

Cadillac Desert: The American West and Its Disappearing Water is a 1986 American history book by Marc Reisner about land development and water policy in the western United States. The book largely focuses on the history of two federal agencies, the Bureau of Reclamation and the U.S. Army Corps of Engineers, and their struggles to remake the American West in ways to satisfy national settlement and energy generation goals. The book concludes that the development-driven policies, formed when settling the West was the country's main concern, have had serious long-term negative effects on the environment and water quantity.

The book was revised and updated in 1993, with a new afterword by the author. The book was again reissued in 2017, with a lengthy Postscript by Lawrie Mott, a former staff scientist at the Natural Resources Defense Council.

== Topics discussed ==
- Army Corps of Engineers
- Bureau of Reclamation
- California Aqueduct
- California Water Wars
- Central Arizona Project
- Colorado River
- Colorado River Storage Project
- David Brower
- Floyd Dominy
- Garrison Dam
- Glen Canyon Dam
- Grand Coulee Dam
- Hoover Dam
- Klamath Diversion
- Los Angeles Department of Water and Power
- Manifest Destiny
- Mono Lake
- Native Americans
- NAWAPA
- Ogallala Aquifer
- Owens Valley
- Powell Geographic Expedition of 1869
- "Rain follows the plow"
- St. Francis Dam
- Salmon run
- Salton Sink
- Snail darter controversy
- Stewart Lee Udall
- Teton Dam
- William Mulholland

== Reception ==
In a review written shortly after publication, The New York Times described the book as "a revealing, absorbing, often amusing and alarming report on where billions of their dollars have gone – and where a lot more are going." In 1986, Cadillac Desert was a finalist for both the National Book Critics' Circle Award and the Bay Area Book Reviewers' Award (BABRA).

In 1999, a Modern Library panel of authors and critics ranked it 61st on a list of the 100 most notable English-language works of nonfiction of the 20th century.

The Property and Environment Research Center reviewed the book 25 years after first publication, calling it a "masterpiece" and saying that it is "compelling today as it was on publication in 1986". It praised the research that went into work, calling out the interviews performed by Reisner to produce the book. Summit Daily News has also praised Reisner's research and called out Reisner's framing of the Bureau of Reclamation as the "clear villain" and the Colorado River as its "most abused victim", ultimately calling the book "prophetic."

== Adaptations and representations in other media ==
A portion of the 1993 update was printed in the 1994 inaugural edition of the Hastings West-Northwest Journal of Environmental Law and Policy.

A four-part television documentary based on the revised book was produced in 1996 by KTEH, the PBS affiliate in San Jose, California.

This book has been referred to in 21st-century fiction about the effects of climate change (so-called climate fiction), such as Paolo Bacigalupi's The Water Knife (2015), a thriller set in the near-future. Several characters refer to Cadillac Desert as having anticipated the environmental decline they are living through. The physical book also plays an important role. Claire Vaye Watkins refers to Cadillac Desert as a source in her acknowledgments for her novel, Gold Fame Citrus (2015).

== See also ==
- California State Water Project
- California water wars
- Chinatown (1974 film)
- Water conflicts
- Water in California
