= Glen Canyon Dam Bridge =

Bridge in Arizona, United States

Glen Canyon Bridge
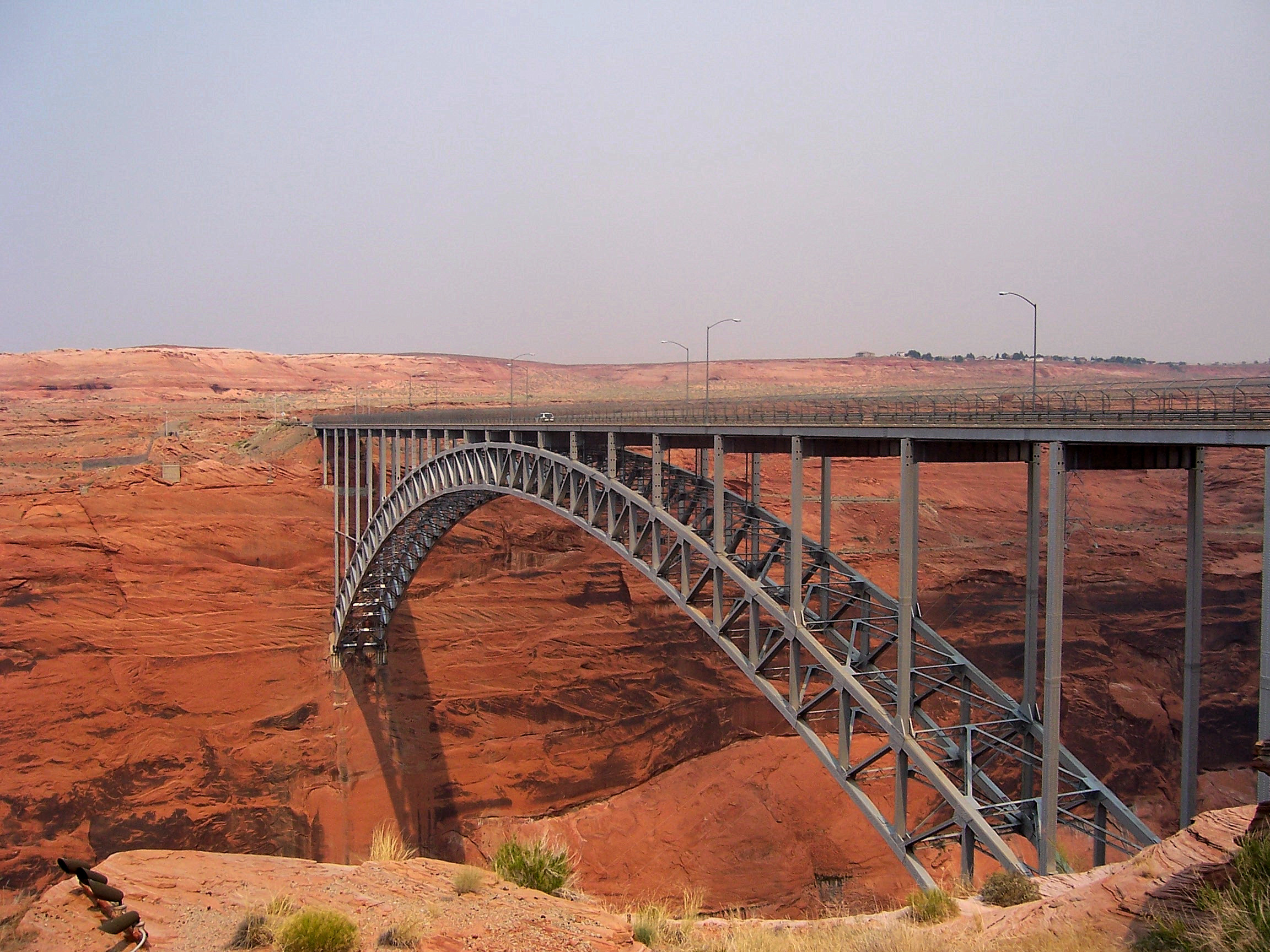
- Coordinates: 36.9356°N 111.4834°W
- Carries: US 89
- Crosses: Colorado River
- Locale: Arizona, United States

Characteristics
- Design: Steel open-spandrel arch
- Total length: 1,271 feet (387 m)
- No. of spans: 1
- Clearance above: 700 feet (210 m)

History
- Constructed by: U.S. Bureau of Reclamation
- Construction start: 1957
- Construction end: 1959
- Construction cost: $4 million (equivalent to $33 million in 2024 dollars)

Location
- Interactive map of Glen Canyon Bridge

The Glen Canyon Bridge or Glen Canyon Dam Bridge is a steel arch bridge in Coconino County, Arizona, carrying U.S. Route 89 across the Colorado River. The bridge was originally built by the United States Bureau of Reclamation to facilitate transportation of materials for the Glen Canyon Dam, which lies adjacent to the bridge just 865 feet (264 m) upstream. The two-lane bridge has an overall length of 1,271 feet (387 m) with a deck 700 feet (210 m) above the river, making it one of the highest bridges in the United States. The bridge was the highest arch bridge in the world when completed in 1959.

== See also ==
- List of highest bridges
