= Marc Reisner =

American environmentalist and writer

Marc Reisner (September 14, 1948 – July 21, 2000) was an American environmentalist and writer best known for his book Cadillac Desert, a history of water management in the American West.

== Early life and education ==
Reisner was born in Minneapolis, Minnesota, the son of a lawyer and a scriptwriter, and graduated from Earlham College in 1970.

== Career ==
=== Environmental activism ===
For a time, Reisner was on the staffs of Environmental Action and the Population Institute in Washington, D.C. Starting in 1972, he worked for seven years as a staff writer and director of communications for the Natural Resources Defense Council in New York.

=== Writings and television work ===
In 1979, Reisner received an Alicia Patterson Journalism Fellowship, which enabled him to conduct the research that led to the writing of Cadillac Desert, first published in 1986. According to The Guardian, Cadillac Desert illuminated the importance of water conservation in the American West with "the remarkable ability to explain entertainingly the complex, and often numbing, deals and disputes in the 'water wars' that have plagued the west." The book was a finalist for both the National Book Critics' Circle Award and the Bay Area Book Reviewers' Award (BABRA) that same year. In 1999, a Modern Library panel of authors and critics ranked it 61st on a list of the 100 most notable English-language works of nonfiction of the 20th century. It was later made into a documentary film series that premiered nationwide on PBS nationwide in 1997 and won a Columbia University/Peabody Award.

Reisner went on to write additional books and helped develop a 1997 PBS documentary on water management that emphasized human endeavor in the building of dams. He was featured as an interviewee in Stephen Ives's 1996 PBS documentary series The West, which was produced by Ken Burns.

In 1997, Reisner published a discussion paper for the American Farmland Trust on water policy and farmland protection.

=== Dam removal ===
Shortly before he died, Reisner had won a Pew Charitable Trusts Fellowship to support efforts to restore Pacific salmon habitat through dam removal.

=== Sustainability ===
Reisner was also involved in efforts to promote sustainable agronomy and green entrepreneurship. In 1990, in partnership with the Nature Conservancy, he co-founded the Ricelands Habitat Partnership, an innovative program designed to enhance waterfowl habitat on California farmlands and reduce pollution by flooding rice fields in the winter instead of burning the rice straw, as was then the common practice. He also joined in efforts to help California rice farmers develop eco-friendly products from compressed rice straw, and a separate project to promote water conservation through water transfers and groundwater banking.

=== Teaching ===
For a time, Reisner was a distinguished visiting professor at the University of California, Davis, lecturing on the relationship between urbanization and environmental concerns.

== Criticism ==
In his later years, Reisner was criticized by some environmentalists for his connection to two private companies that they felt went against the values he presented in his books: one company stored water underground for profit, and the other promoted the use of rice fibers in Western rice paddies. Reisner later stated that he had changed his mind about the latter due to its ability to provide habitat for birds.

== Death ==
Reisner died of colon cancer on July 21, 2000, at his home in San Anselmo, California. He was survived by his wife, biochemist and environmentalist Lawrie Mott, and their two daughters, Ruthie and Margot. His final book, A Dangerous Place, was completed before his death but did not appear in print until 2003.

== Books ==
- Cadillac Desert: The American West and Its Disappearing Water (1986, revised 1993). ISBN 0-14-017824-4
- Overtapped Oasis: Reform or Revolution for Western Water (with Sarah Bates) (1990). ISBN 0-933280-75-0
- Game Wars: The Undercover Pursuit of Wildlife Poachers (1992). ISBN 0-436-41053-2
- A Dangerous Place: California's Unsettling Fate (2003). ISBN 0-14-200383-2
