= Utah State Route 195 (1947–2007) =

Former state highway in Utah, United States

State Route 195
- 2300 East

Route information
- Maintained by UDOT
- Length: 2.566 mi (4.130 km)
- Existed: 1947–2007

Major junctions
- South end: SR-266 in Holladay
- North end: I-80 in Salt Lake City

Location
- Country: United States
- State: Utah

Highway system
- Utah State Highway System; Interstate; US; State; Minor; Scenic

State Route 195 (SR-195) was a north–south state highway in the U.S. state of Utah, following 2300 East in Salt Lake County. Formed in 1947, the route initially created a link from south of the University of Utah to future I-80. By the late-1960s, the route was extended south to Holladay, including an unbuilt portion of 2300 East between 2100 South and I-80. Following relinquishments of the route to Salt Lake City and Holladay, the road was deleted from the state highway system in 2007.

== Route description ==
=== Holladay ===
SR-195 started at a four-way intersection with SR-266 in what is now the city of Holladay; though not state-maintained, the road extended a few blocks south of SR-266, passing Holladay Elementary (now Holladay's city hall), to a nearly 45° three-way intersection with Holladay Boulevard (which itself intersected Murray-Holladay Road (former SR-174) only a few yards (meters) south of that). The proximity of the two intersections caused complex traffic problems that were solved in the late 2000s (decade) by pedestrianizing Holladay Boulevard northwest of the intersection.

SR-195 itself (north of SR-266) proceeded north with one lane in each direction, a center turn lane, and a nearly continuous sidewalk on the east side. It passed the west side of Olympus High School just south of 3900 before leaving (what is now) incorporated Holladay at 3900 South. Other than the high school and small commercial developments south of 3900 south, the state-maintained portion of 2300 East passed through uniformly residential suburban areas in what is now Holladay.

=== Millcreek Township ===
SR-195's surroundings and cross-section remained similar to those in the Holladay area until the intersection with 3300 South (SR-171), with commercial developments only near the 3900 South and 3300 South intersections. However, after crossing over Mill Creek at about 3500 South, SR-195 ran along the west edge of what is now the Evergreen Avenue Historic District and passed in front of a former radio factory on the north bank of Mill Creek.

North of 3300 South, the surroundings reverted to mostly residential, and, approaching I-80, the lack of the calming effects of local traffic due to the road's direct connection to the freeway and simultaneous lack of connections to other major destinations or cross streets made the road's high speed traffic a barrier to all forms of cross traffic, including the proposed Parley's Trail. Salt Lake County now proposes to build a roundabout near the I-80 exit to help calm the traffic and provide better access across the highway.

=== Salt Lake City (pre-1981) ===
Between Foothill Drive (US-40A) and south of 2100 South (US-40), former SR-195 contained two lanes in each direction as it headed south of the University of Utah. For many years, 2300 East ended abruptly just before I-80 in preparation for a future bridge over the Interstate. However, this connection of SR-195 over the freeway never came to fruition, leaving two unused sections of road on both sides. The whole highway also ran on the east bench of the Salt Lake Valley at about 4,600 feet (1,400 m).

== History ==
The state legislature created SR-195 in 1947, following 2300 East from 2100 South (then US-40 through Salt Lake City) north to Foothill Drive (SR-186). The State Road Commission extended the route south from SR-186 to proposed I-80 in 1961. In 1968, the route was extended south to Holladay Boulevard near Murray-Holladay Road (former SR-174) in Holladay, at the same time as it removed SR-152 from that area. However, when the legislature approved the latter change, it instead placed the south terminus at a newly created extension of SR-266 (4500 South). By 1971, an interchange at I-80 giving eastbound travelers on that route an exit to southbound SR-195 and vice versa was completed. The portion north of I-80, including jurisdiction of a never-built portion between I-80 and 2100 South, was given back to Salt Lake City in 1981. The portion within Holladay (south of 3900 South) was relinquished in 2006, and the legislature deleted the remainder the next year.

== Major intersections ==
The entire route was in Salt Lake County.

Location	mi	km	Destinations	Notes
Holladay	0.000	0.000	SR-266 (4500 South)	Southern terminus 1969–2006
Holladay	0.880	1.416	3900 South	Southern terminus 2006–2007
	1.763	2.837	SR-171 (3300 South)	
Salt Lake City	2.566	4.130	I-80 west	Northbound entrance and southbound exit; northern terminus 1981–2007
Salt Lake City	3.6	5.8	US-40 (2100 South)	Briefly US-40A, now solely Parleys Way; southern terminus 1947–1969
Salt Lake City	4.3	6.9	Alternate US-40 (Foothill Drive)	Briefly US-40, now SR-186; northern terminus 1947–1981
1.000 mi = 1.609 km; 1.000 km = 0.621 mi: Incomplete access
