= Utah State Route 186 =

State highway in Utah, United States

State Route 186
- SR-186 highlighted in red

Route information
- Maintained by UDOT
- Length: 9.336 mi (15.025 km)
- Existed: 1935–present

Major junctions
- West end: US 89 in Salt Lake City
- US 89 in Salt Lake City; SR-71 in Salt Lake City
- East end: I-80 / I-215 in Salt Lake City

Location
- Country: United States
- State: Utah

Highway system
- Utah State Highway System; Interstate; US; State; Minor; Scenic
← SR-180	→ US 189

State Route 186 (SR-186) is a state highway entirely within Salt Lake City, capital of the U.S. state of Utah. It forms a quarter-beltway connecting US-89 and I-15 leading north from Salt Lake City to I-80 leading east; as such, it effectively forms the missing (non-freeway) quarter of the I-215 belt route around the city, though it does not directly connect to I-215 at the north end. Despite this beltway role, the route passes through downtown Salt Lake City because downtown is built right up to the northern mountains surrounding City Creek Canyon. The portion of the route connecting downtown to I-80 is a high-capacity street heavily used by commuters, especially those travelling to the University of Utah or between downtown and eastern neighborhoods, but the portion on Capitol Hill north of downtown is much narrower and has sharp turns around the Capitol grounds. The roadway runs 9.34 miles (15.03 km) along Victory Road, Columbus Street, 300 North, State Street, 400 South, 500 South, and Foothill Drive.

The highway, as SR-186, was formed in 1935, initially going from what is now US-89 in downtown east on 400 South, west on 200 South after a gap, and south on 1300 East to US-40, now 2100 South. Portions of this route were signed as US-40 Alternate. By 1954, Foothill Drive existed in its current state and US-40A, as well as the legislative and unsigned SR-186 designation, was routed along that road. At one point, the highway extended west to the Salt Lake City International Airport (well after US-40A was truncated), but this connection was lost in 2007 when SR-186 was aligned to cover all of former SR-184, which was decommissioned that same year.

The entire route is included as part of the National Highway System.

== Route description ==
=== Capitol Hill ===
The highway begins at the intersection of Beck Street (US-89) and Victory Road. The route heads up Victory Road as a two-lane undivided highway, forming the northern limit of urban development in the Marmalade District. The land north of Victory road is the fell-like slope leading up to Ensign Peak. As the road heads southeast, it reaches the top of Salt Lake's Capitol Hill, a foothill of Ensign Peak, where residential developments begin to appear on the north side. The route turns south onto Columbus Street and runs along the west side of the Utah State Capitol grounds. At the grounds' southwest corner, SR-186 connects to Main Street and turns east on 300 North. A short distance east, at the foot of the front steps of the Capitol building, the route again turns south onto State Street and descends to downtown.

=== Downtown Salt Lake City ===
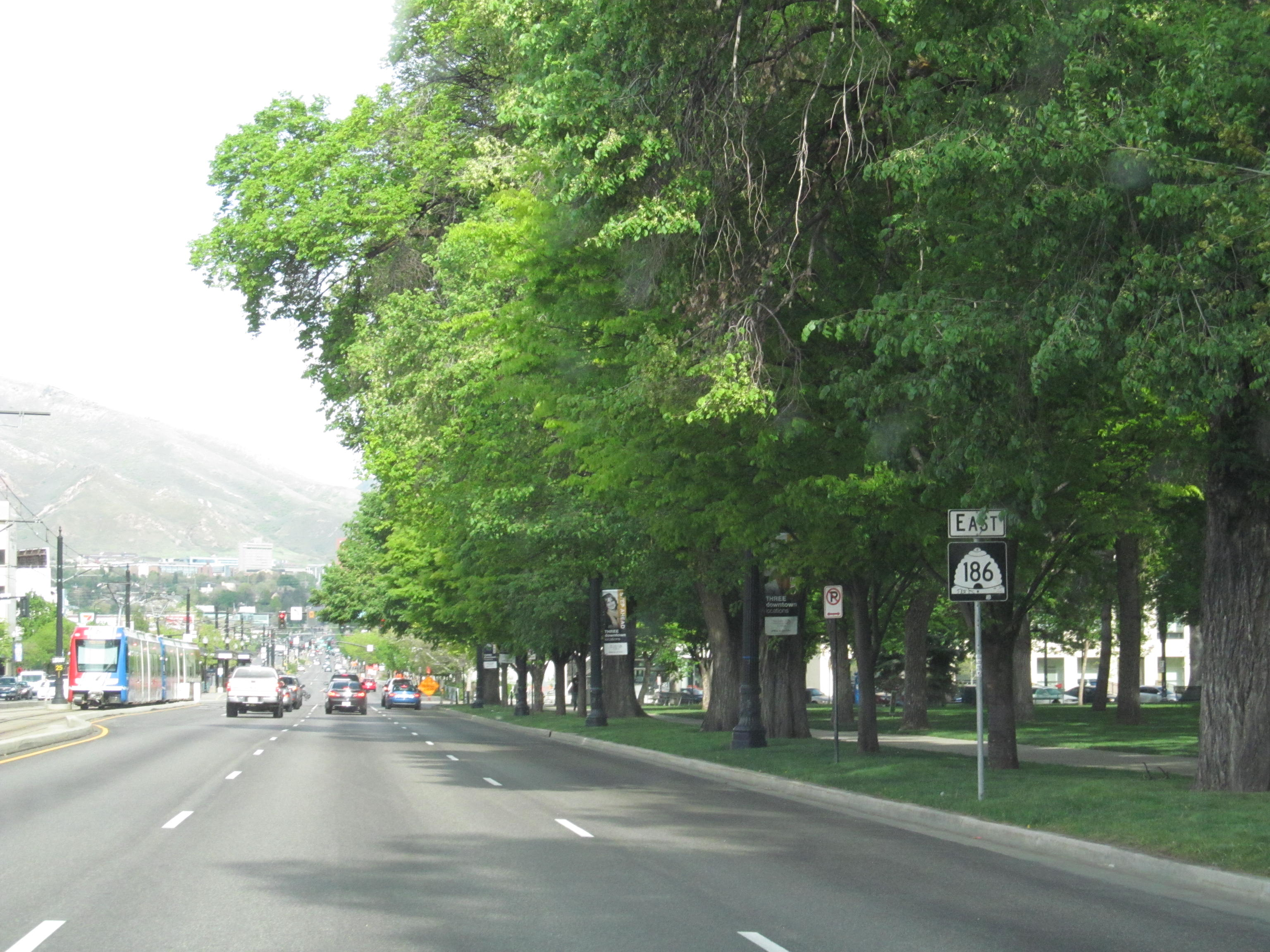
SR-186 eastbound

Widening to three lanes in each direction at North Temple, SR-186 continues on State Street for a total of seven blocks before turning east on 400 South next to Washington Square. US-89 turns west from northbound State Street at the same intersection. Light rail (the UTA TRAX Red Line) runs in the median of SR-186 from this point to Stadium station at about 1350 East.

=== 400 South and 500 South ===
400 South, which is also known as University Boulevard, passes through the eastern edge of downtown and meets the northern end of SR-71 at 700 East. SR-186 then curves south (effectively becoming 1000 East for a short time) one block to climb the escarpment forming the boundary of the East Bench, subsequently becoming 500 South. The honorary University Boulevard name follows this curve as well. After the light rail tracks leave the median with a gated grade crossing of the westbound lanes, the route passes the University of Utah's Rice-Eccles Stadium, various University of Utah support buildings in the southern reaches of the campus, the Veteran's Administration Hospital, and a small military area (the remnants of Fort Douglas) before turning southeast and becoming Foothill Drive (also known as Foothill Boulevard).

=== Foothill Drive ===
Foothill Drive crosses Red Butte Creek before turning south to come into alignment with 2100 East (a name that is still sometimes used for this segment to avoid confusion with an old northwest-southeast segment of Foothill Drive just to the west). The intersection with Sunnyside Avenue (previously SR-65) leading to Emigration Canyon is at the northern end of this segment. The street then passes through a small residential area and along the western side of Bonneville Golf Course before turning southeast again, crossing Emigration Creek, and narrowing to two lanes in each direction past a commercial area. The route continues southeast before connecting to I-80, southbound I-215, and westbound Parleys Way.

== Light rail ==
The UTA TRAX Red Line runs in the median of SR-186 from State Street to the Stadium station at about 1350 East, and there are three stations in the median: Library, Trolley, and 900 East & 400 South. Though the median forms a dedicated right-of-way for the trains almost everywhere, there are some places where left-turn lanes overlap the trains' right-of-way.

Bus rapid transit is planned for Foothill Drive south of the university.

== Bicycling ==
None of the high-capacity segment of SR-186 east of downtown has bicycle lanes. Bicyclists are encouraged (but not required) to use a less busy street such as 300 South (Broadway) as an alternative to SR-186 on 400 South and 500 South. Similarly, Wasatch Boulevard is a designated bicycle route parallel to Foothill Drive; however, the north end of Wasatch Boulevard takes a major detour to the east around Bonneville Golf Course, which makes it less useful for commuters to the university, so bicyclists end up using the very busy north end of Foothill Drive anyway (north of Sunnyside Avenue, there is at least a short sidepath).

At the south end of Foothill Drive, several dedicated bridges for the Bonneville Shoreline Trail and Parley's Trail provide access across I-80 and I-215 at the mouth of Parley's Canyon, so bicyclists have multiple options there.

== Legal definition ==
The legal definition of State Route 186 is as follows:

72-4-124. State highways—SR-186, SR-189, SR-190
(1) SR-186. From Route 89 at Beck Street in Salt Lake City southerly on Victory Road and Columbus Street; then easterly on Third North; then southerly on State Street to Fourth South Street; then easterly on Fourth South, Tenth East, and Fifth South Streets; then southerly on Foothill Boulevard to Route 80.[4]

== History ==
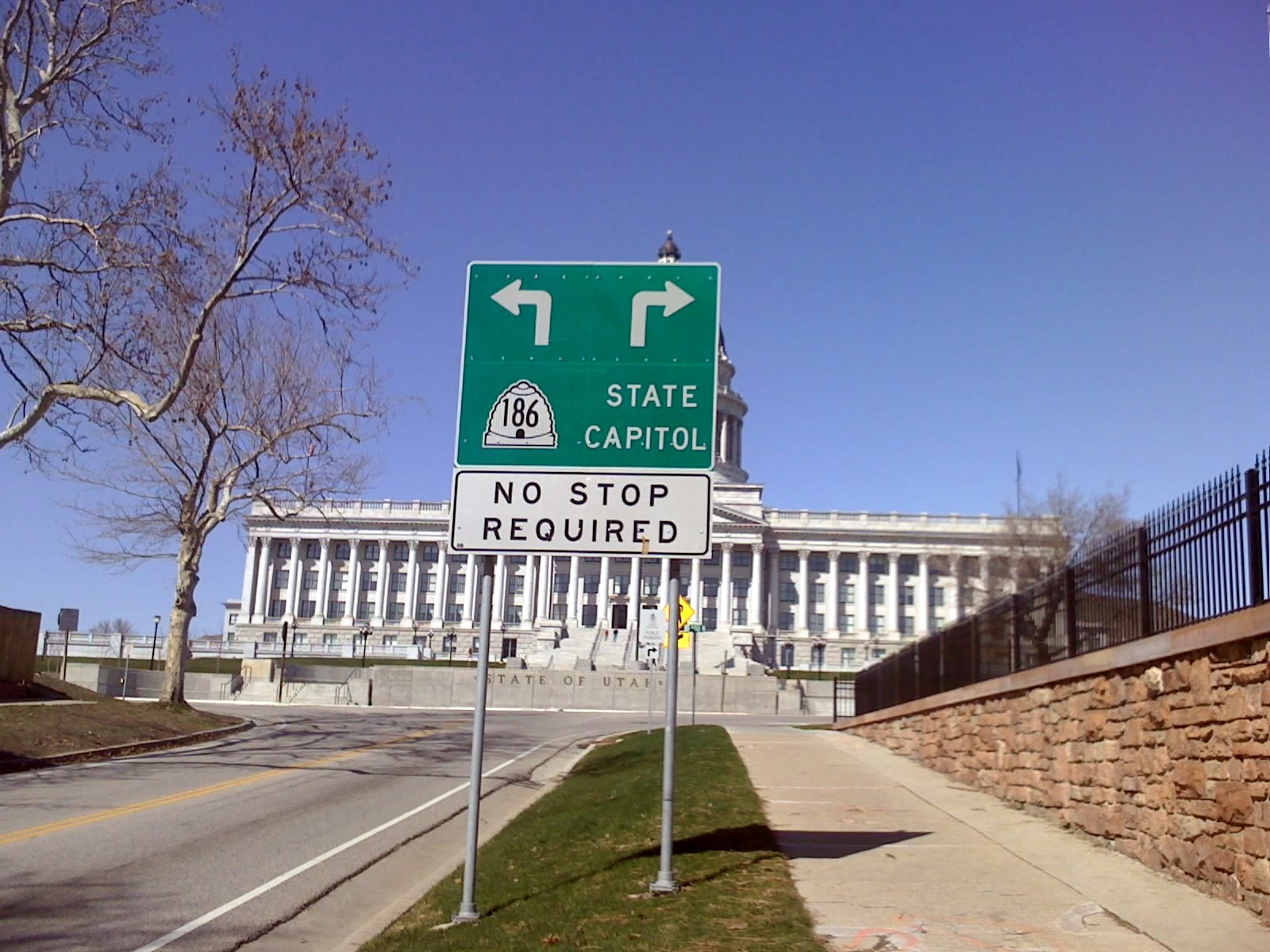
SR-186 by the Utah State Capitol

The state legislature created State Route 186 in 1935. Its original route began at US-89/US-91 (now solely US-89) at the corner of State Street and 400 South, and followed the present route east to the University of Utah, but then it turned north with a gap through the university grounds, west on 200 South, and south on 1300 East to end at 2100 South, then US-40. Legislatively designated as SR-186 by the state, this was signed and treated as US-40 Alternate (US-40A) otherwise. Although SR-186 was a hidden legislative designation along the path of US-40A, the portion of 400 South between 300 West (where US-40 ran) and Redwood Road (SR-68) was solely SR-186 by 1941, and was signed as such. By 1948, the path of US-40A (hidden SR-186) ran from US-40 at the mouth of Parleys Canyon northwesterly along Foothill Drive until turning west on Sunnyside Avenue, north on 1300 East and west on 500 South and 400 South before terminating at 300 West, which then carried the designations of US-40, US-89, and US-91. By 1954, Foothill Drive was extended north past Sunnyside Avenue toward the University of Utah, and US-40A was rerouted along this new stretch of road. By 1965, US-40 and US-40A switched routes; henceforth, US-40 would run along current-day SR-186 until it was truncated in the mid-1970s. In 1966, the State Road Commission extended the route southwest on a proposed roadway to I-215, but the Bureau of Public Roads denied the request to build it with federal aid because placing an interchange at that location on I-215 was infeasible, and it was cut back to SR-68 in 1967.

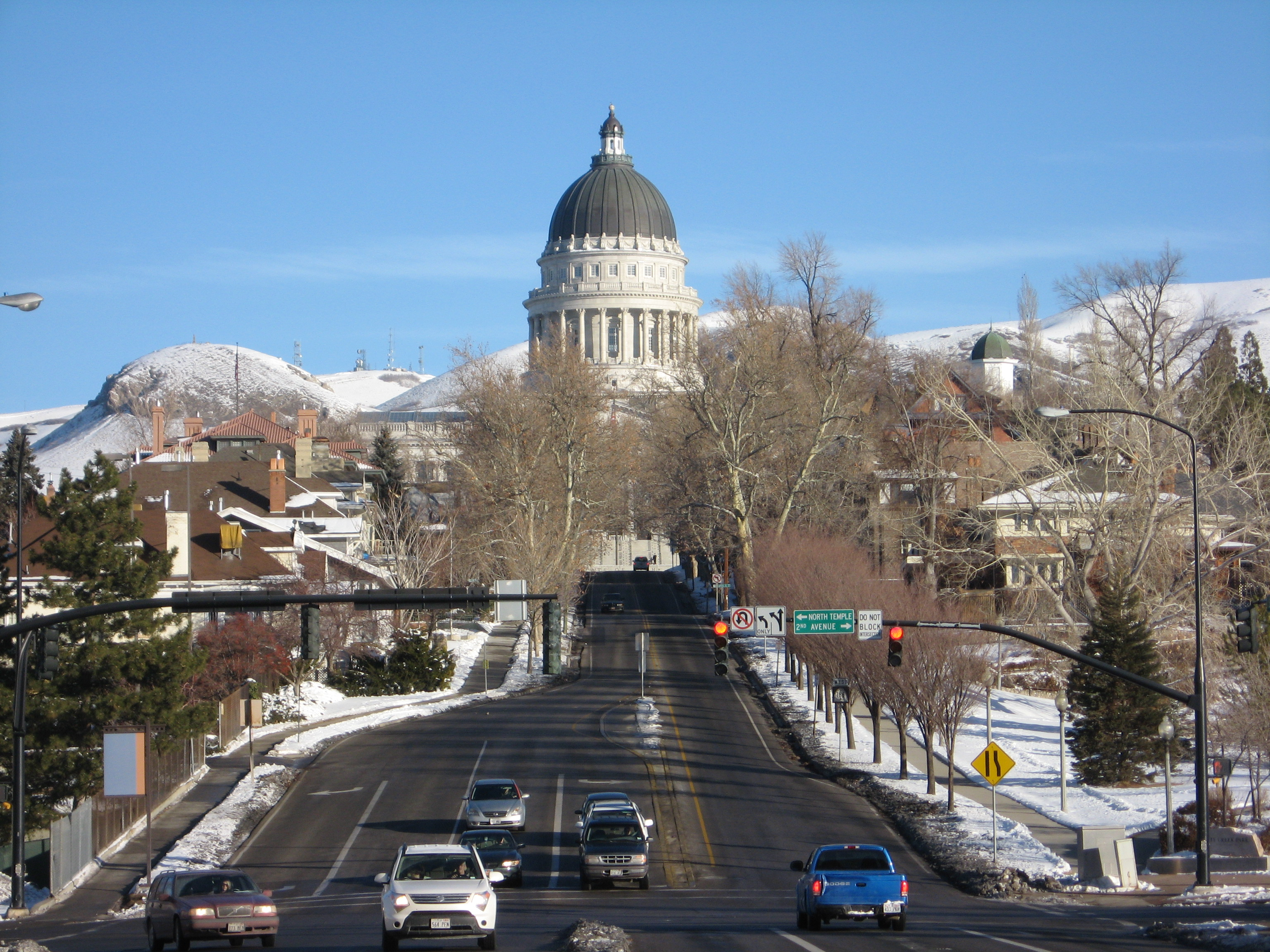
Northbound at North Temple Street

North Temple Street west of 300 West (then US-89/91, now solely US-89) was added to the state highway system in 1931 as part of SR-67. Since it was along the planned alignment for I-80, it became SR-2 (only a legislative designation that was never signed) in 1962, but the portion east of an interchange near the Salt Lake City International Airport was due to be bypassed by the Interstate, and so in 1966 that piece became State Route 267. State Route 176 was built in 1933 with federal aid and numbered in 1935, forming an alternate to US-89/91 through downtown Salt Lake City. Its original route began at South Temple Street and 300 West, and ran south on 300 West and east on 900 South to State Street. The north end was extended one block to North Temple Street in 1962, when US-89A/91A was moved from South to North Temple, and in 1967 the south end was removed from 900 South and sent down 300 West to SR-171 (3300 South). The latter extension was done in exchange for State Route 202, which followed Main Street between SR-201 (2100 South) and SR-171 from 1961 to 1967. Both of these routes - SR-176 and SR-267 - became part of SR-186 in 1969. The parts of SR-186 (400 South) west of SR-176 (300 West) and SR-176 south of SR-186 were dropped from the state highway system, and SR-186 was extended north on 300 West to North Temple and west on North Temple to I-80, replacing the remainder of SR-176 and all of SR-267.

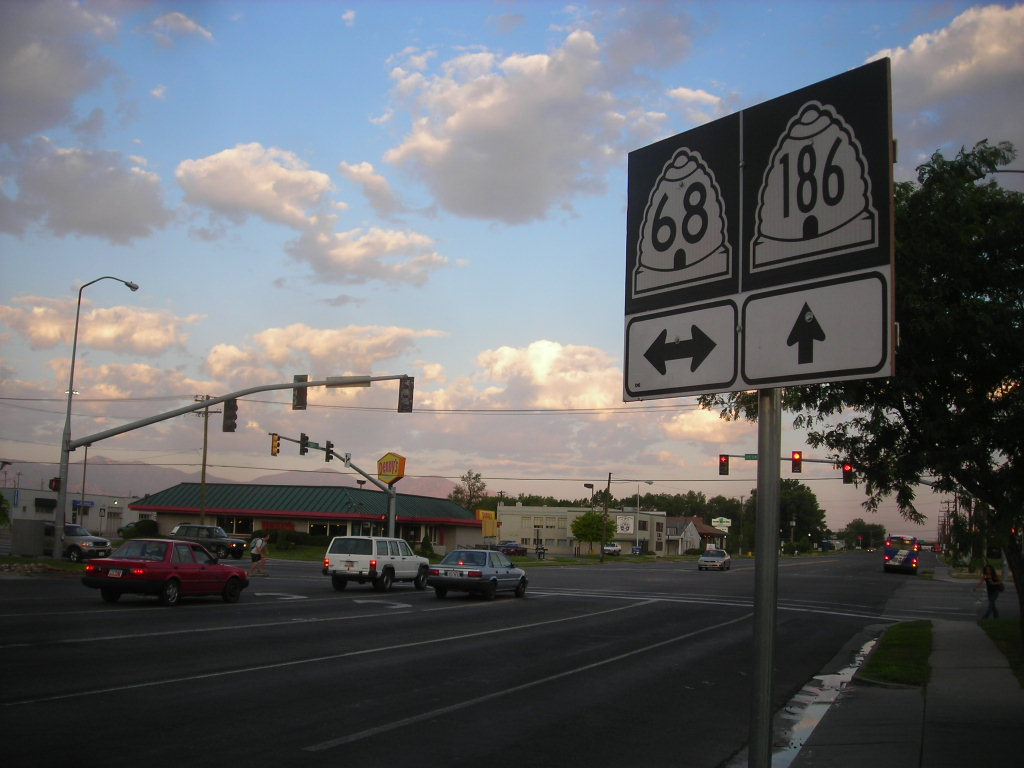
Former SR-186 (on North Temple) at the intersection with SR-68

State Route 184 was created in 1963, running north from US-89A/91A at North Temple and State Streets around the west side of the State Capitol and back to SR-1 north of downtown. The roadway had previously been part of SR-181 since 1935, but with US-89A/91A moving from South Temple to North Temple, a new number was needed to avoid a one-block overlap. SR-184 remained a separate route until 2007, when North Temple west of State Street was given to Salt Lake City for the Airport extension of the TRAX Green Line. Since North Temple had carried US-89 east of 300 West, that route was realigned to use what had been SR-186 on 300 West and 400 South, cutting SR-186's west end back to 400 South and State Street. But that intersection was also the south end of SR-184, and SR-186 was extended to absorb SR-184.

== Major intersections ==
The entire route is in Salt Lake City, Salt Lake County.

mi	km	Destinations	Notes
0.000	0.000	US 89 (Beck Street)	Western terminus
1.912	3.077	North Temple Street	Former US-89 north
2.656	4.274	US 89 (State Street)	
3.557	5.724	SR-71 (700 East)	
4.555	7.331	1300 East	Former SR-181
5.007	8.058	SR-282 (Campus Center Drive)	
5.512	8.871	SR-282 (Wasatch Drive)	
6.036	9.714	Sunnyside Avenue	Former SR-65
6.937	11.164	2300 East	Former SR-195
8.643	13.910	Parleys Way west	Interchange; no westbound entrance
8.856	14.252	I-80 – Reno, Park City, Evanston	Interchange; eastbound exit and westbound entrance; I-80 exit 129
9.336	15.025	I-215 south (Belt Route)	Eastern terminus; interchange; eastbound exit and westbound entrance; I-215 exit 1
1.000 mi = 1.609 km; 1.000 km = 0.621 mi: Incomplete access

== See also ==
- List of state highways in Utah
