= Utah State Route 71 =

State highway in Utah, United States

State Route 71
- SR 71 highlighted in red

Route information
- Maintained by UDOT
- Length: 22.465 mi (36.154 km)
- Existed: 1931–present

Major junctions
- South end: SR-154 in Riverton
- I-15 in Draper; US 89 in Draper; SR-152 in Murray; I-80 in Salt Lake City
- North end: SR-186 in Salt Lake City

Location
- Country: United States
- State: Utah

Highway system
- Utah State Highway System; Interstate; US; State; Minor; Scenic
← I-70	→ SR-72

State Route 71 (SR-71) is a state highway completely within the Salt Lake City metropolitan area in the northern portion of the US state of Utah. It runs from SR-154 in the southwest side of the city to SR-186 in Downtown Salt Lake City. The route spans 22.47 miles (36.16 km) as it runs along portions of 12600 South, 12300 South, 900 East, and 700 East streets.

The entire route is included as part of the National Highway System.

== Route description ==
=== Riverton ===
The highway begins at the intersection of SR-154 (Bangerter Highway) and 12600 South in Riverton and heads east on 12600 South, a four-lane undivided highway. As the route continues east through suburban Riverton and intersects 1300 West, it gains a center median and turns northeast. The route passes a park and a golf course and crosses over the Jordan River. The road straightens to the east and, moving north three blocks on the Salt Lake County grid position, turns into 12300 South.

=== Draper ===
The highway enters Draper and intersects with I-15 at exit 291, a single-point urban interchange. Between this interchange and Factory Outlet Drive, a concurrency spanning 0.097 miles (0.156 km) with US-89 occurs. The road continues east through Draper before turning north onto 700 East. Past Kimballs Lane, the road veers to the west slightly and crosses the Utah Transit Authority's TRAX Blue Line's Draper light rail extension at an acute angle, then straightens to its original northerly direction past 11400 South.

=== Sandy ===
The route passes through Sandy as a five-lane (including center turn lane) road with sidewalks along most of its length. A bridge spans Dimple Dell Park (Dry Creek) north of 10600 South. In this area, the road is next to White City, an unincorporated enclave of Sandy. The road intersects 9400 South (former Utah State Route 209) in a retail area, then intersects 9000 South (current Utah State Route 209) at the southeast corner of the Sandy Historic District.

=== Midvale ===
SR-71 enters Midvale at 7800 South and curves northeast along the south bank of the East Jordan Canal, passing Hillcrest High School before crossing over the canal and turning north again (as 900 East) to run through the western part of the Fort Union commercial district. Upon reaching Interstate 215, the road is joined by the Jordan and Salt Lake Canal, and the canal and road cross the freeway together on adjacent bridges, entering Murray.

=== Murray ===
Access to Interstate 215 from SR-71 is provided by Winchester Street, which connects to Exit 9 a short distance to the east. Wheeler Farm appears east of SR-71 as the Jordan and Salt Lake Canal passes under the road and continues east in a pipe just north of Winchester Street. The route intersects the eastern segment of Vine Street (former State Route 173) just as it passes over Little Cottonwood Creek, which is in a concrete trench; the western segment of Vine Street meets SR-71 at an unsignalized intersection a short distance further north. After passing a retail area and the entrance to a golf course, the road meets the north (non-state-maintained) segment of 900 East, the northern terminus of SR-152 (Van Winkle Expressway), and Murray-Holladay Road (former State Route 174) at a six-way intersection south of Big Cottonwood Creek. The complexity of this six-way intersection has been moderated by effectively dividing it into two three-way and one four-way intersection in close proximity: SR-71, in particular, turns west at the four-way intersection (from which 900 East continues north and SR-152 continues east) and then immediately intersects Murray-Holladay Road at a signalized three-way intersection (though northwest-bound traffic on SR-71 never has to stop, due to a channelized free right turn arrangement). Beyond this intersection, SR-71 (which now has four lanes in each direction, having absorbed much of SR-152's traffic) crosses Big Cottonwood Creek and forms the border between Murray and Millcreek Township for a short distance as it curves north again to become 700 East and intersect SR-266 (4500 South).

=== Millcreek Township and South Salt Lake ===
The road continues straight north as 700 East through Millcreek Township, then, north of 3900 South, as the border between Millcreek Township and South Salt Lake (it never fully enters South Salt Lake). It intersects SR-171 (3300 South) right after crossing Mill Creek, then passes Nibley Golf Course before entering Salt Lake City. Throughout this area (and continuing as far north as Liberty Park in Salt Lake City), the road was widened to four or more vehicle lanes in each direction by acquisition (using eminent domain) and flattening of a large amount of property on the west side; as a result few structures (and even fewer old buildings) front onto the west side of the street, whereas the east side has many remaining old houses and even old street light poles.

=== Salt Lake City ===
The highway continues north on 700 East in Salt Lake City and intersects I-80 at exit 125, a diamond interchange. It crosses the S Line (formerly known as Sugar House Streetcar) right-of-way west of the Forest Dale neighborhood of Sugar House, and then intersects 2100 South (former US-40 and US-40A). Between 2100 South and Liberty Park, the road passes through mainly residential areas and includes bicycle lanes despite its formidable width and heavy traffic. SR-71 passes along the eastern edge of Liberty Park, which extends from 1300 South to 900 South. At 900 South the road narrows to approximately its original (generous) width laid out by Brigham Young and then passes Trolley Square (600 South to 500 South) before terminating at SR-186 (400 South), which has the UTA TRAX Red Line in its median, near the Gilgal Sculpture Garden. 700 East continues north as a wide (but not state-maintained) road as far as South Temple.

== Future ==
The east–west portion of SR-71 in Riverton and Draper is being studied as a route for future public transportation improvements due to its route connecting the current UTA TRAX Red Line terminus in Daybreak to the nearly completed Blue Line terminus station in Draper via a Draper FrontRunner station in western Draper.

== History ==
The state legislature created State Route 71 in 1931, running south from US-40 (2100 South) along 900 East and through Draper, Corner Canyon, and Alpine to US-50/US-89/US-91 (now solely US-89) in American Fork. However, the portion across the Traverse Mountains between SR-111 (12300 South) in Draper and Alpine was never built, and was removed from the state highway system in 1935; at the same time, the southern piece from Alpine to American Fork was renumbered SR-74. In 1957, most of SR-71 was moved west two blocks to 700 East, the south end was truncated to 7700 South north of Sandy (replaced by an extension of SR-111), and the north end was extended to SR-181 (South Temple Street). This change was partially reverted in 1959, when the south end was extended back to Draper over what had just become SR-111. In 1969, the north end was cut back four blocks to SR-186 (400 South), and the south end was extended west along what had been SR-111 (created in 1931) to SR-68 (Redwood Road) in Riverton. A short extension west from the south end to the new SR-154 (Bangerter Highway) was made in 2001, pending reconstruction by the state.

A $4 million construction project at the intersection of SR-71 and State Street (US-89) in Draper converted the intersection into a Michigan left, where travelers going west on SR-71 would turn north onto State Street then make a U-turn to access southbound State Street. Construction started in early 2011 and completed in late 2011.

== Major intersections ==
The entire route is in Salt Lake County.

Location	mi	km	Destinations	Notes
Riverton	0.000	0.000	SR-154 (Bangerter Highway)	Southern terminus
Riverton	2.377	3.825	SR-68 (Redwood Road) – Lehi, Salt Lake City	
Draper	4.927– 5.002	7.929– 8.050	I-15 / US 89 south – Provo, Salt Lake City	West end of US-89 overlap; I-15 exit 291
Draper	5.099	8.206	US 89 north (State Street) / Minuteman Drive	Michigan left intersection East end of US-89 overlap
Sandy	10.233	16.468	SR-209 (9000 South)	
Murray	15.709	25.281	SR-152 (Van Winkle Expressway)	
Murray–Millcreek line	16.514	26.577	SR-266 (4500 South)	
Millcreek–South Salt Lake line	18.276	29.412	SR-171 (3300 South)	
Salt Lake City	19.540– 19.619	31.447– 31.574	I-80 – Reno, Cheyenne	I-80 exit 125
Salt Lake City	22.465	36.154	SR-186 (400 South)	Northern terminus
1.000 mi = 1.609 km; 1.000 km = 0.621 mi: Concurrency terminus
