= Utah State Route 210 =

State highway in Utah, United States

State Route 210
- SR-210 highlighted in red

Route information
- Maintained by UDOT
- Length: 13.618 mi (21.916 km)
- Existed: 1941–present

Major junctions
- North end: SR-190 in Cottonwood Heights
- East end: Alta

Location
- Country: United States
- State: Utah

Highway system
- Utah State Highway System; Interstate; US; State; Minor; Scenic
← SR-209	→ SR-211

State Route 210 (SR-210) is a state route in the U.S. state of Utah that is the access road for Little Cottonwood Canyon and the ski resorts of Alta and Snowbird. The 13.62 mi (21.92 km) highway straddles the southeastern edge of the Salt Lake Valley before it enters the mouth of Little Cottonwood Canyon.

== Route description ==
The highway heads south on Wasatch Boulevard from the point SR-190 turns east from that road onto Fort Union Boulevard. The four-lane undivided highway continues south-southwest before turning south-southeast again past the intersection of 3500 East. The route then turns off of Wasatch Boulevard and onto Little Cottonwood Canyon Road past the junction of Danish Road and turns east-southeast approaching SR-209. The route turns east entering the mouth of Little Cottonwood Canyon and continues east and east-northeast before terminating in Alta.

== History ==
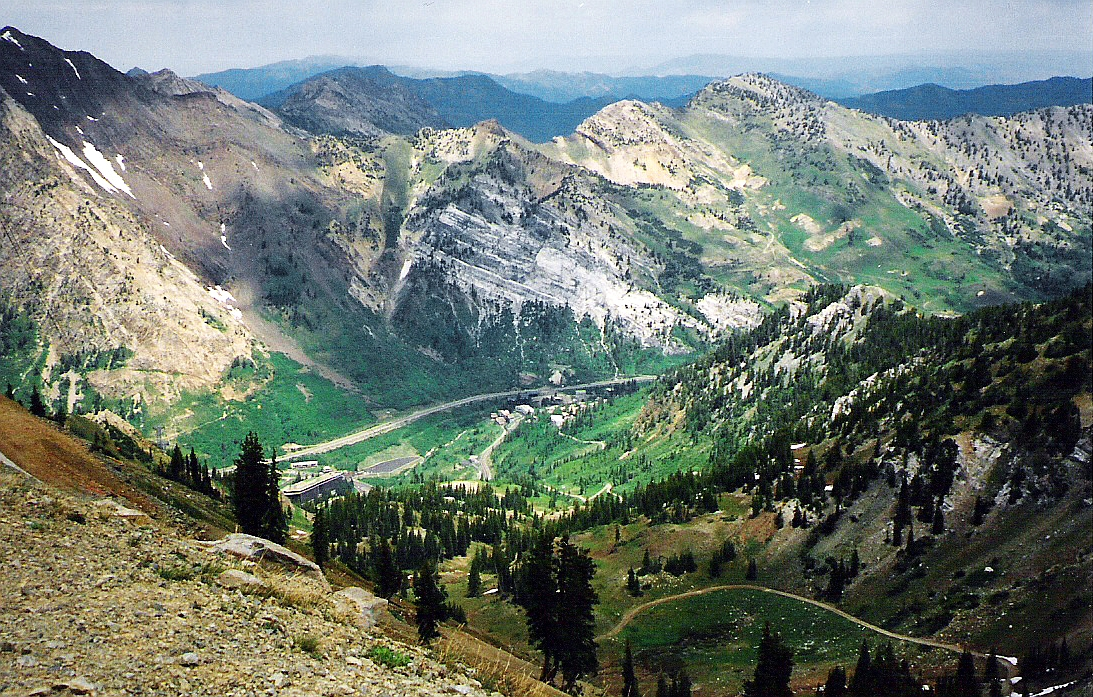
A view of State Route 210 from Snowbird ski resort

The state legislature defined State Route 210 in 1941 to run from SR-4 (US-40, now I-80) at the mouth of Parley's Canyon south along Wasatch Boulevard to Little Cottonwood Canyon, then east through the canyon to Alta. In 1945, the west end was moved to the intersection of Fort Union Boulevard (then SR-152) and Highland Drive. The route now followed Highland Drive, Creek Road, and Danish Road, rejoining the former alignment at the mouth of Little Cottonwood Canyon. A short piece of Wasatch Boulevard north of 3300 South remained a state highway, as an extension of SR-171, but the remainder was removed from the system. At some point in the 1950s, the connection from Highland Drive to Wasatch Boulevard was moved north from Creek Road and Danish Road to 3500 East and the newly built Bengal Boulevard.

In 1969, the route was moved to Wasatch Boulevard north of the Little Cottonwood Canyon turnoff, placing the western terminus at SR-152 near the mouth of Big Cottonwood Canyon and removing those portions of Danish Road, Bengal Boulevard, and Highland Drive from the state system. The Alta Bypass Road was added to SR-210 in 1975, providing an alternate route when snow slides close the main roadway. A final extension on the west end was made in 1987, continuing north on Wasatch Boulevard and northwest on a then-proposed limited access extension of 6200 South to I-215. However, a year later, this instead became part of the recently formed SR-190 so that SR-210 would not have to be remileposted.

State Route 229 was defined in 1941, connecting SR-210 near Alta to SR-152 (now SR-190) near Brighton along a proposed roadway. The definition of SR-210 was changed in 1969 to absorb this mountainous route, but in 1994 it was truncated back to Alta, the extension having not been constructed.

== Major intersections ==
The entire route is in Salt Lake County.

Location	mi	km	Destinations	Notes
Cottonwood Heights	0.000	0.000	SR-190 (Wasatch Boulevard, Fort Union Boulevard)	Western terminus
Cottonwood Heights	1.206	1.941	3500 East	Former alignment of SR-210
Sandy	3.856	6.206	SR-209 west (Little Cottonwood Road)	
Snowbird	10.752	17.304	Alta Bypass Road (SR-210 east)	
Alta	11.559	18.602	Alta Bypass Road (SR-210 west)	
Alta	12.524	20.155	Alta Ski Area	Eastern terminus of main segment
Gap in route
Alta	12.525	20.157	SR-210 (Little Cottonwood Canyon Road)	Eastern terminus of Bypass Road segment
Snowbird	13.618	21.916	SR-210 (Little Cottonwood Canyon Road)	Western terminus of Bypass Road segment
1.000 mi = 1.609 km; 1.000 km = 0.621 mi
