= Utah State Route 152 =

State highway in Utah, United States

State Route 152
- SR-152 highlighted in red

Route information
- Maintained by UDOT
- Length: 3.044 mi (4.899 km)
- Existed: 1933–present

Major junctions
- West end: SR-71 in Murray and Millcreek
- East end: I-215 in Cottonwood Heights

Location
- Country: United States
- State: Utah

Highway system
- Utah State Highway System; Interstate; US; State; Minor; Scenic
← SR-151	→ SR-153

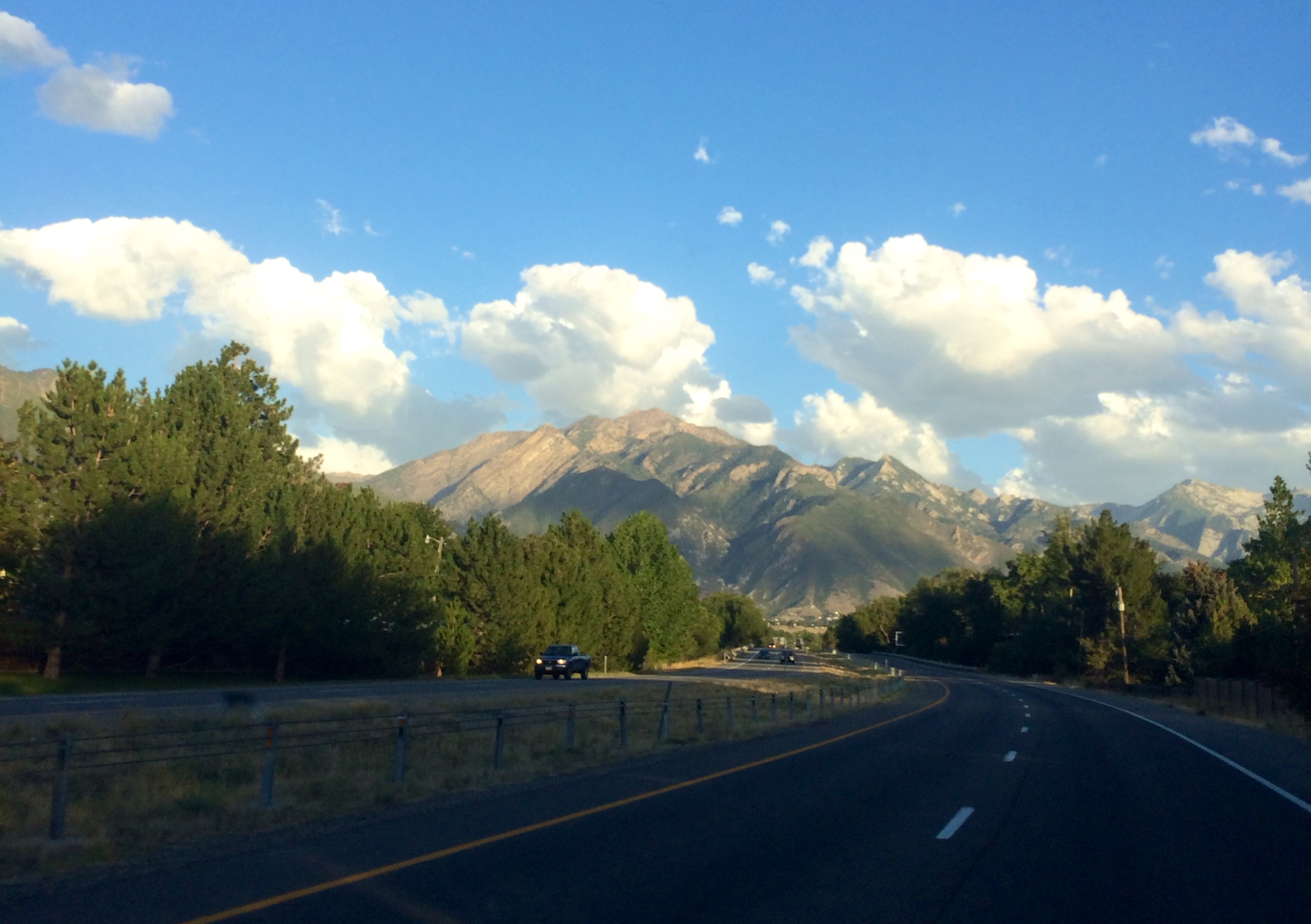
Van Winkle Expressway traveling east approaching 1300 E

State Route 152 (SR-152) is a state highway in the suburbs of Salt Lake City, Utah connecting SR-71 in Murray to I-215 and city-maintained Highland Drive in Cottonwood Heights, though for almost all of its length it forms the border between Murray and Holladay. The at-grade expressway, which is 3.04 miles (4.89 km), is laid on the entire length of the Van Winkle Expressway and a portion of Highland Drive.

The route was initially created in 1933, then following Highland Drive from 2700 South southeast to 6200 South, turning east on that street to Knudsen's Corner, then entering Big Cottonwood Canyon. A series of truncations and realignments brought the route south to I-215 (south of 6200 South) and north to SR-71.

== Route description ==
SR-152 begins at the four-way intersection of Van Winkle Expressway and 900 East just south of Big Cottonwood Creek (SR-71 turns west from 900 East onto Van Winkle Expressway, which defaults onto 700 East). Immediately to the east, there is an unsignalized three-way intersection (at which SR-152 traffic does not stop) with Murray-Holladay road (former SR-174), which heads straight east (SR-71 intersects the western portion of former SR-174 just west of SR-152's starting point). From there, SR-152 heads southeast as a four-lane divided highway with limited at-grade access through an undeveloped, low-lying, and wooded strip of land. For a short distance in this area, the road forms the border between Murray and Millcreek Township, but south of that, SR-152 is always the border between Murray and Holladay. Past an intersection at the terminus of former SR-181 (1300 East), the route dips south-southeast to intersect with 5600 South near Cottonwood High School and a small commercial area. The route once again veers to the southeast before crossing the Jordan and Salt Lake Canal in a low-density residential area (including horse properties). Upon reaching the intersection with Vine Street (former SR-173) and 6100 South (a very short street connecting to the northern section of Highland Drive), the Van Winkle Expressway enters a commercial area and soon turns into (the southern section of) Highland Drive; a short one-way segment of Highland Drive provides an alternate route between the (much wider) northern and southern segments of that street for northbound vehicles. South of the 6100 South intersection, SR-152 has six lanes and sidewalks and loses its wide unpaved median in favor of a center turn lane. The route terminates seven-tenths of a mile later at an interchange with I-215.

The entire route is included as part of the National Highway System.

== History ==
The state legislature defined State Route 152 in 1933 on a route that began at 2700 South, followed Highland Drive and 6200 South to Knudsen's Corner, and then entered Big Cottonwood Canyon via Big Cottonwood Canyon Road to end at the Uinta-Wasatch-Cache National Forest boundary. In 1941, it was extended east in the forest to Brighton, and in 1945 the connection from Highland Drive to the canyon was moved south to Fort Union Boulevard. A short truncation at the north end was made in 1957, making the new terminus the intersection of Highland Drive and 1300 East (SR-181). In order to provide access to the new Wasatch Mountain State Park, SR-152 was extended east from Brighton in 1963, following an existing county road over Guardsman Pass to end at SR-224. By 1968, the Van Winkle Expressway (then known as the Cottonwood Diagonal) had been completed, and SR-181 was being reconstructed, making the Highland Drive portion of SR-152 redundant. The State Road Commission truncated SR-152 to the south end of the expressway near 6200 South, in exchange for an extension of SR-195 to Holladay, and the next year the legislature designated the expressway as part of SR-152, giving it a new northern terminus at 900 East (SR-71). Finally, in 1987, a piece in the middle of SR-152, from I-215 south and east to Wasatch Boulevard (SR-210), was removed from the state highway system and replaced by proposed 6200 South and Wasatch Boulevard between I-215 and Big Cottonwood Canyon Road. To avoid an overlap of SR-152 on I-215, the new roadway became an extension of SR-210, and former SR-152 from Wasatch Boulevard to SR-224 became a new SR-190. (The next year, the extension of SR-210 was instead redesignated as part of SR-190.)

== Major intersections ==
The entire route is in Salt Lake County.

Location	mi	km	Destinations	Notes
Murray–Millcreek line	0.000	0.000	SR-71 (700 East, 900 East)	Western terminus
Millcreek	0.095	0.153	Murray-Holladay Road	Former SR-174 east
Murray–Holladay line	0.723	1.164	1300 East	Former SR-181
Murray–Holladay line	1.442	2.321	5600 South	
Murray–Holladay line	2.349	3.780	Vine Street, Highland Drive	Former SR-173, SR-152 west
Murray–Holladay line	2.518	4.052	6200 South	Former SR-152 east
Murray–Holladay– Cottonwood Heights tripoint	3.044	4.899	I-215	Eastern terminus; interchange
1.000 mi = 1.609 km; 1.000 km = 0.621 mi
