= Utah State Route 181 (1935–2007) =

Former state highway in Utah, United States

State Route 181
- 1300 East
- SR-181 from 1969 – 17 October 2007 (delineated in red)

Route information
- Maintained by UDOT
- Length: 6.904 mi (11.111 km)
- Existed: 1935–2007

Major junctions
- South end: SR-152 near Holladay
- SR-171 near Salt Lake City; I-80 in Salt Lake City
- North end: SR-186 in Salt Lake City

Location
- Country: United States
- State: Utah

Highway system
- Utah State Highway System; Interstate; US; State; Minor; Scenic

State Route 181 (SR-181) was a state highway in the U.S. state of Utah connecting SR-152 in Murray and Holladay north to SR-186 in Salt Lake City at its peak, the former being suburbs of the latter. The route was 6.9 miles (11.10 km) for thirty-eight years before being truncated in 2007 and decommissioned entirely later in the same year.

When the route was formed in 1935, it went from U.S. Route 89/U.S. Route 91 (US-89/US-91) near North Salt Lake southeast to the Utah State Capitol, then south on State Street, east on South Temple, and south again on 1300 East to US-40 in Salt Lake City. The route was eventually truncated south to SR-186 and extended south to SR-152, then decommissioned north of SR-171 in 2007 and deleted entirely the same year.

The residential and institutional land uses along the route contrast sharply with the nearby and nearly parallel route formed by 1100 East and Highland Drive (part of former SR-152), which has commercial and retail uses along a very high percentage of its length, and SR-181 in effect served as a bypass of the congestion associated with that commercial development.

== Route description ==
SR-181 began at the modern border of Murray and Holladay at the intersection of SR-152 and 1300 East and headed north on the latter on a two-lane undivided highway, as it was for most of the route (The portion of 1300 East south of SR-152, which was never state maintained, is actually much wider than most of SR-181). In the route's first two miles (mostly within modern Millcreek Township), a small military logistics facility and St. Mark's Hospital were located on the west side, the latter at the junction with 3900 South. Further north, SR-181 crossed over Mill Creek and then immediately climbed a steep hill to cross the Jordan and Salt Lake Canal just before intersecting SR-171 (3300 South) and entering Salt Lake City. From this point on, the route ran along the top of the nearly-continuous escarpment dividing the East Bench of the Salt Lake Valley from lower-lying land to the west; the escarpment coincidentally runs almost perfectly north-to-south.

The highway expanded to four lanes past SR-171 and veered northwesterly through a major commercial area, therefore going slightly out of the alignment of 1300 East in the Salt Lake County grid system and becoming Richmond Street through southern Highland Park. This was brief, however, and it returned to 1300 East on the grid alignment past Highland Drive and reverted to its original direction in northern Highland Park. At Highland Drive, the highway widened to six lanes (plus, for the first time, frontage roads on the west side). SR-181 continued north to intersect I-80, Parley's Creek (with Parley's Trail, still under construction as of 2012), and 2100 South in Sugar House (next to Sugar House Park, the former Sugar House Prison), where it lost four of its six lanes. This stretch of road, from 2100 South north to 1300 South, was frequently congested. After the crossing of Emigration Creek, Westminster College and the Frank M. and Susan E. Ulmer House were located on the west side of the road on this segment, while the Wasatch Hollow neighborhood was on the east side. The route gained a lane in the southbound section past 1300 South and another lane in the northbound section by 900 South, but these extra lanes have been removed in favor of bicycle lanes, center turn lanes, and extra parking since Salt Lake City took ownership of the road. Beyond 900 South, the road passed east of East High School. It continued in this matter to its terminus at SR-186, near the University of Utah and west of the Rice-Eccles Stadium.

== History ==
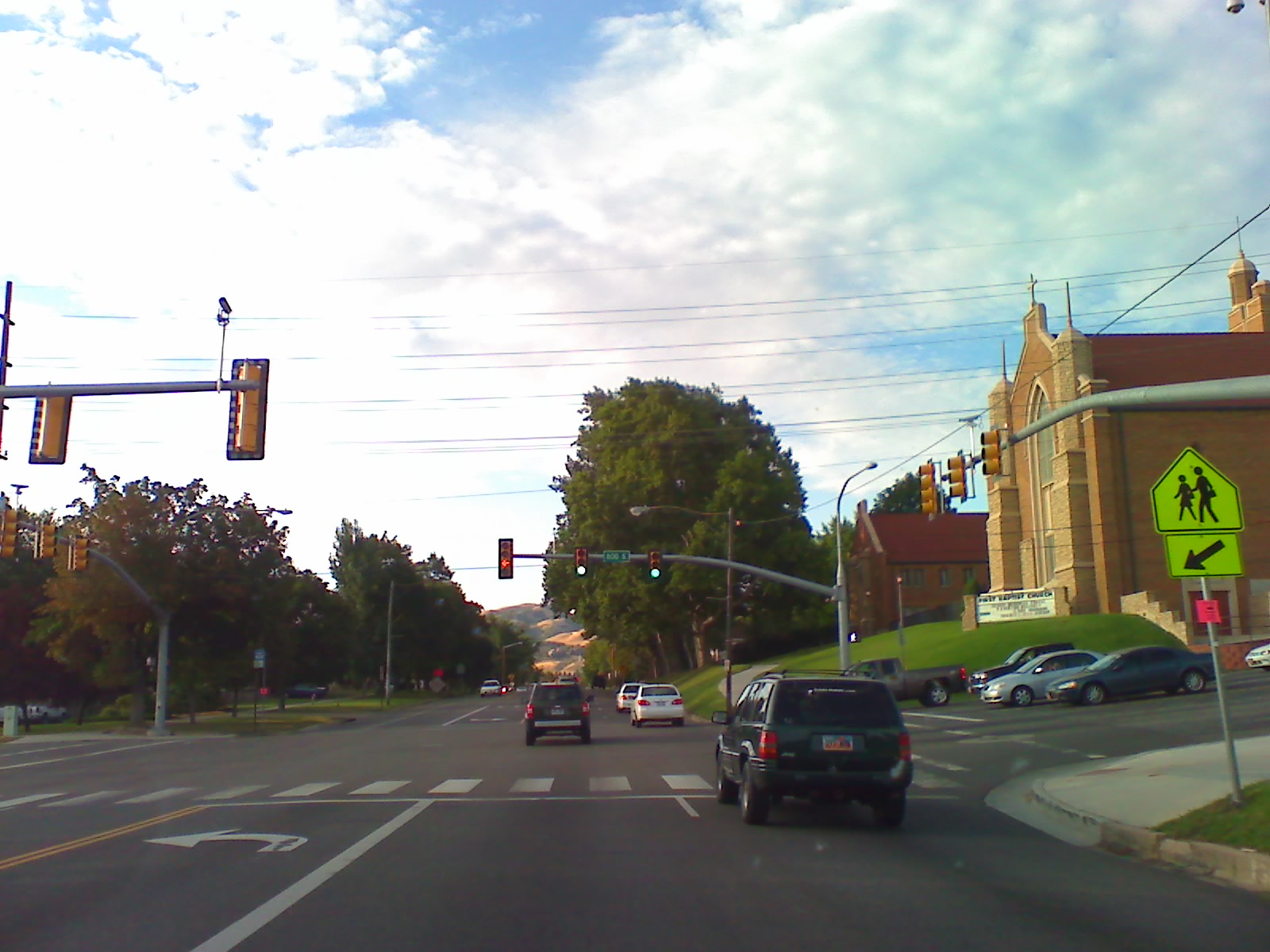
Former SR-181 at 800 South

The state legislature formed State Route 181 in 1935, beginning at the junction of US-89/US-91 (now solely US-89) and going southeast on Victory Road to the Utah State Capitol. It then went south on State Street to South Temple, turned east on that street and then turned south on 1300 East. It continued south to US-40 (2100 South), where it terminated. In 1957, the highway was extended south by Commission to 1300 East (SR-152), which at that time ran along Highland Drive in Sugar House. In 1961, the highway was extended further south to 3300 South (SR-171). Another southward extension in 1969 brought the route to SR-152, which at that time was running along the Van Winkle Expressway.

In the early 1990s, traffic planners planned to relieve the congestion that was affecting the two-lane section of the route between 2100 South and 1300 South by implementing a center reversible lane. The reversible lane would have flowed in a northbound direction in the morning and a southbound direction in the evening. There would also be eight overhead signals spaced about a block apart each reminding motorists what direction the lane was flowing in. However, this plan never came to fruition due to local opposition over safety and cost and was canceled at the end of 1993. On 17 October 2007, the portion of the route in Salt Lake City city limits (north of SR-171) was transferred to the city's ownership. On 7 December of the same year, the remainder of the route was transferred to Salt Lake County's jurisdiction.

== Major intersections ==
This table reflects the routing 1969–17 October 2007. The entire route was in Salt Lake County.

| Location | mi | km | Destinations | Notes |
|---|---|---|---|---|
| | 0.000 | 0.000 | SR-152 (Van Winkle Expressway) | Southern terminus |
| | 1.044 | 1.680 | SR-266 (4500 South) | |
| | 2.814 | 4.529 | SR-171 (3300 South) | |
| Salt Lake City | 3.573 | 5.750 | Highland Drive | Former SR-152 |
| Salt Lake City | 4.195– 4.329 | 6.751– 6.967 | I-80 | Interchange |
| Salt Lake City | 4.622 | 7.438 | 2100 South | Former US-40, US-40A |
| Salt Lake City | 6.904 | 11.111 | SR-186 (500 South) | Northern terminus Former US-40A, US-40 |
1.000 mi = 1.609 km; 1.000 km = 0.621 mi
