= Utah State Route 209 =

State highway in Utah, United States

State Route 209

Route information
- Maintained by UDOT
- Length: 18.840 mi (30.320 km)
- Existed: 1969–present

Major junctions
- West end: Bingham Canyon Mine
- SR-85 in West Jordan; SR-154 in West Jordan; I-15 in Sandy
- East end: SR-210 near Little Cottonwood Canyon

Location
- Country: United States
- State: Utah

Highway system
- Utah State Highway System; Interstate; US; State; Minor; Scenic
← SR-208	→ SR-210

State Route 209 (SR-209) is a state highway in the U.S. state of Utah, following 9000 South and other east–west streets south of Salt Lake City. It connects the Bingham Canyon Mine with I-15 in Sandy and the ski areas of Little Cottonwood Canyon.

== Route description ==
The road begins at the gate to the Bingham Canyon Mine and heads northeast as a two-lane undivided highway on the Bingham Highway. The road enters the town of Copperton and turns east. After exiting the town, the Bingham Highway splits into the Old and New Bingham Highway, with SR-209 turning northeast on the latter. The highway enters West Jordan and widens to four lanes as it curves east into 9000 South, just before crossing the Mountain View Corridor. After crossing 5600 West, the route heads downhill within the Salt Lake Valley. It crosses the Savage Bingham and Garfield Railroad line to the Bingham Canyon Mine (ex-D&RGW) at Welby, as well as Bangerter Highway and SR-68 before it reaches the Jordan River. After crossing the river, SR-209 begins climbing through the eastern part of the valley, passing through Sandy, and curving into 9400 South after crossing SR-71. The route ends at SR-210 near the mouth of Little Cottonwood Canyon, where the valley gives way to the Wasatch Range.

East of the SR-111 junction, SR-209 is included in the National Highway System.

== History ==
State Route 177 was designated in 1965 along 9000 South between SR-68 and US-89 in Sandy, in order to provide access to the new I-15. A second route - State Route 209 - was added in 1969, following 9400 South from US-89 east to SR-210. Due to increased traffic in the Sandy area, a new alignment of SR-209 was defined east of SR-71 in 1987 to connect 9000 South directly into 9400 South, and SR-209 was extended west over this proposed roadway and SR-177 to SR-68. A 2005 change extended it farther west over a proposed roadway to meet SR-48. As of 2008, the extension was built to 5600 West, though it was not yet state-maintained, and the remainder, plus a continuation to SR-111, was in the area's regional transportation plan.

In 2015, the segment of SR-48 between the Mountain View Corridor and Bangerter Highway was removed from the state highway system. SR-209 was extended west over what had previously been SR-48 to a new terminus at the Bingham Canyon Mine.

== Major intersections ==
The entire route is in Salt Lake County.

Location	mi	km	Destinations	Notes
Copperton	0.000	0.000	Bingham Canyon Mine	Western terminus
West Jordan	3.023	4.865	SR-111 (Bacchus Highway)	
West Jordan	4.946– 5.022	7.960– 8.082	SR-85 (Mountain View Corridor)	
West Jordan	7.671	12.345	SR-154 (Bangerter Highway)	
West Jordan	9.682	15.582	SR-68 (Redwood Road)	
Sandy	11.651– 11.723	18.750– 18.866	I-15 – Salt Lake City, Las Vegas	Single-point urban interchange
Sandy	12.179	19.600	US 89 (State Street)	
Sandy	18.840	30.320	SR-71 (700 East)	
	14.592	23.484	SR-210 (Little Cottonwood Canyon Road) – Snowbird, Alta	
1.000 mi = 1.609 km; 1.000 km = 0.621 mi
