= Utah State Route 111 =

State highway in Utah, United States

State Route 111
- 8400 West, Bacchus Highway

Route information
- Maintained by UDOT
- Length: 10.596 mi (17.053 km)
- Existed: 1931–present

Major junctions
- South end: SR-209 in West Jordan
- SR-173 in West Valley City; SR-171 in Magna
- North end: SR-201 in Salt Lake City

Location
- Country: United States
- State: Utah

Highway system
- Utah State Highway System; Interstate; US; State; Minor; Scenic
← SR-110	→ SR-112

State Route 111 (SR-111) is a state highway in the U.S state of Utah that runs north–south across the west side of the Salt Lake Valley in Salt Lake County. It connects SR-201 in Magna to SR-209 in West Jordan in a span of 10.6 miles (17.06 km). It is known as 8400 West and Bacchus Highway throughout the route's course, in respect of north to south.

Prior to 1969, SR-111 extended past SR-209 (then SR-48) and passed through Herriman before terminating at SR-71.

== Route description ==
The route begins at a junction with SR-209 on the rural western end of West Jordan, near Copperton. It continues north as a two-lane road and curves northwest past its junction with 7800 South. The highway widens to four lanes by the time 5400 South terminates on the road. Past 5400 South, SR-111 turns north and passes the ghost town of Bacchus, where there is currently an industrial presence. SR-111 continues into Magna and cuts a path through the center of the town before terminating at SR-201, an expressway/freeway that connects the west-central fringes of the county to Salt Lake City.

Between the intersection of 5400 South and 4100 South, a brake check area is provided to northbound traffic.

The entire route is included as part of the National Highway System.

== History ==
The state legislature created State Route 111 in 1931, running west from SR-71 in Draper to SR-68 in Riverton. State Route 159, added in 1933, continued west from Riverton through Herriman to Lark and then turned north along the Oquirrh foothills to U.S. Route 50 (US-50), present-day SR-171 (3500 South), near Magna. The two routes were combined as SR-111 in 1945, and in 1957 the east end was extended north along 700 East, which had been SR-71, to 7700 South north of Sandy, only to be truncated back to Draper in 1959 when SR-71 was again restored there. In 1962, the northern terminus of SR-111 was extended north slightly from 3500 South (by then SR-171) to US-50 Alternate (now SR-201). The final change was a major truncation in 1969, moving the south end of SR-111 to its present location near Copperton, at the New Bingham Highway (SR-48 until 2015, SR-209 since). The portion of old SR-111 from SR-68 in Riverton to SR-71 in Draper became an extension of SR-71, but the remainder was removed from the state highway system.

== Major intersections ==
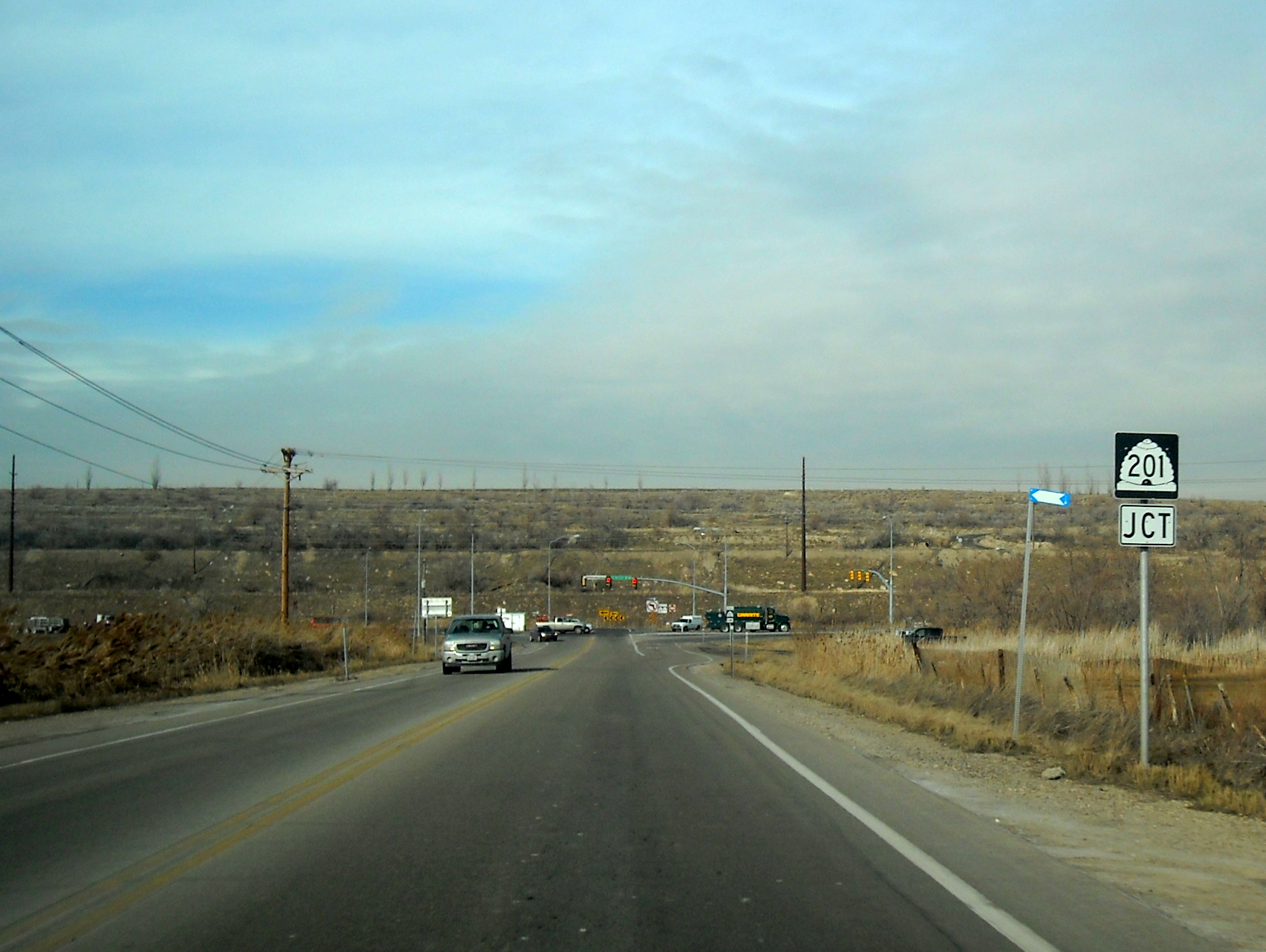
SR-111's northern terminus at SR-201

The entire route is in Salt Lake County.

Location	mi	km	Destinations	Notes
West Jordan	0.000	0.000	SR-209 (New Bingham Highway)	Southern terminus
West Valley City	5.733	9.226	SR-173 (5400 South)	
Magna	9.104	14.651	SR-171 (3500 South)	
Magna	10.534	16.953	SR-201 east	Seagull intersection
Magna	10.596	17.053	SR-201 west to I-80	Northern terminus
1.000 mi = 1.609 km; 1.000 km = 0.621 mi
