= Utah State Route 171 =

State highway in Utah, United States

State Route 171
- 3500 South/3300 South
- SR-171 highlighted in red

Route information
- Maintained by UDOT
- Length: 15.660 mi (25.202 km)
- Existed: 1935–present

Major junctions
- West end: SR-111 in Magna
- SR-154 in West Valley City; I-215 in West Valley City; I-15 in South Salt Lake; US 89 in South Salt Lake
- East end: I-215 in Millcreek

Location
- Country: United States
- State: Utah
- Counties: Salt Lake County

Highway system
- Utah State Highway System; Interstate; US; State; Minor; Scenic
| ← SR-168 | → SR-172 |

State Route 171 (SR-171) is a state highway in the Salt Lake City metropolitan area in northern Utah that runs from SR-111 in Magna in the west side of the city to Interstate 215 in the city of Millcreek in the eastern part valley. In its sixteen-mile span, the route is named 3500 South and 3300 South.

== Route description ==
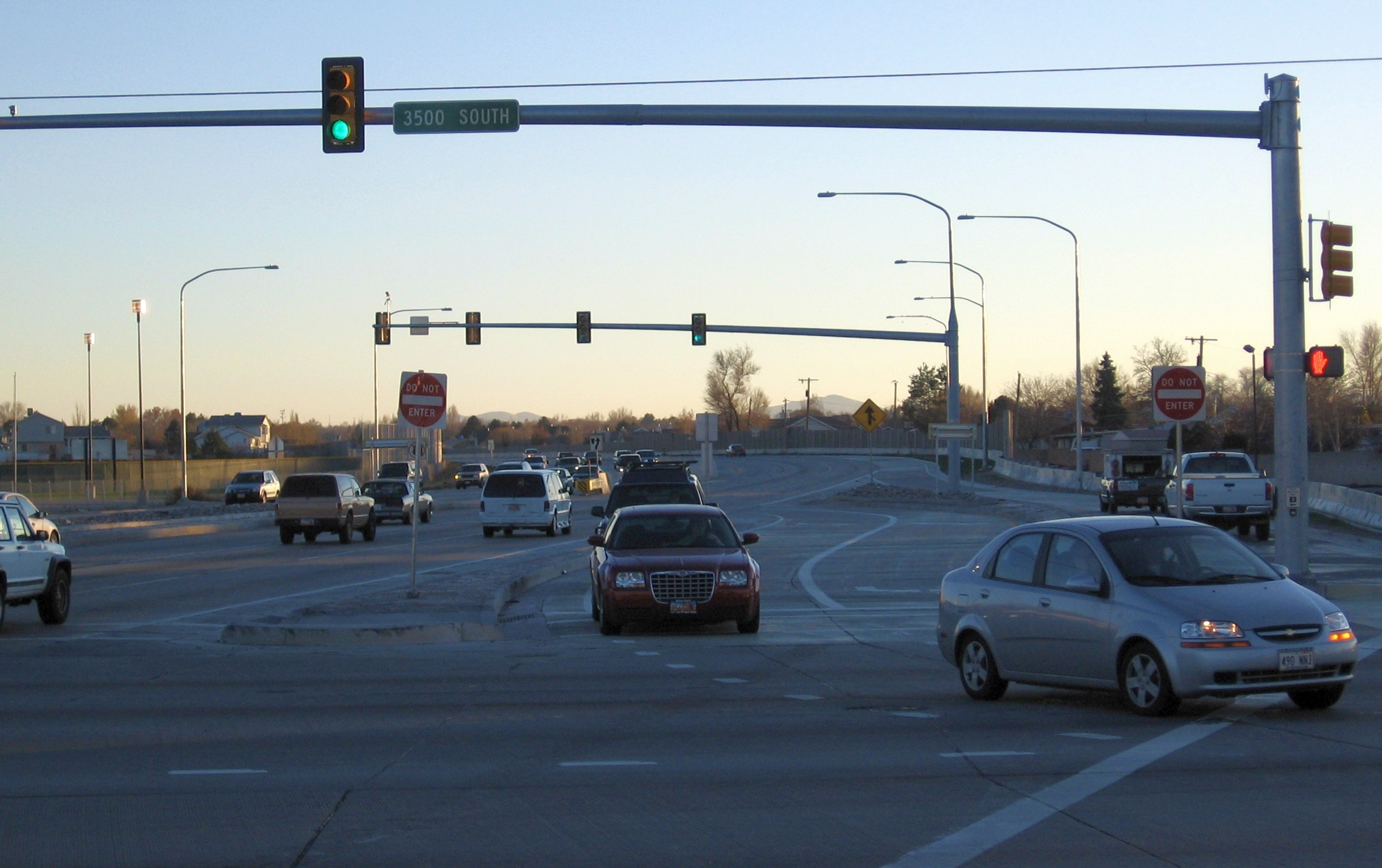
Continuous flow intersection at Bangerter Highway in West Valley City on SR-171

From SR-111 in Magna, the highway (known as 3500 South) runs due east with between one and four general-purpose lanes in each direction until its junction with Redwood Road (SR-68), where it veers to the northeast before again straightening out to the east. Other than the west end, this portion is entirely within West Valley City. The route passes through the former towns (now neighborhoods) of Hunter and Granger as well as West Valley City's modern downtown area near I-215 (which overlaps with historic Granger). The intersection with Bangerter Highway (SR-154) was the first continuous flow intersection built in Utah. At the intersection with 2700 West just west of I-215, the route crosses Green Line (TRAX) light rail tracks near their terminus at the (West Valley Intermodal Hub. Between about SR-154 and Market Street (near 2700 West and I-215), dedicated bus lanes for UTA's 3500 South MAX bus rapid transit line run in the median.

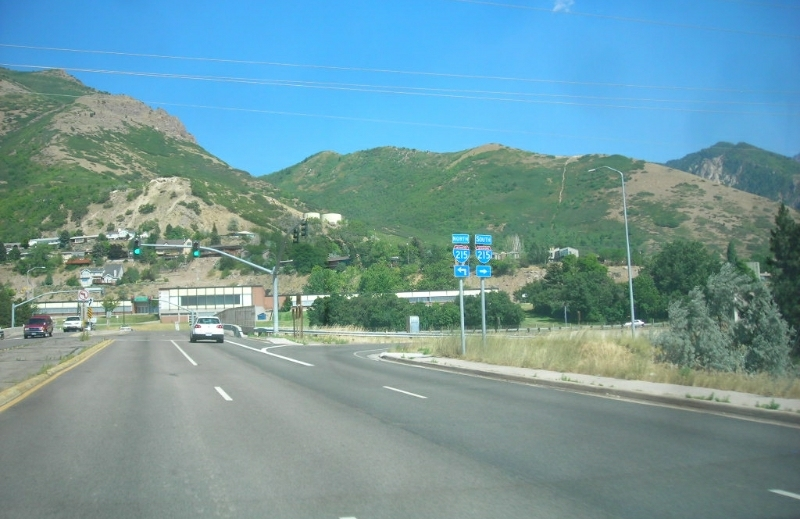
SR-171 approaching I-215

East of Redwood Road and the curve where it becomes 3300 South, SR-171 continues due east with two to three lanes in each direction, passing through South Salt Lake and Millcreek Township (and very small segments near former SR-181 bordering Salt Lake City), until its terminus. It is the first road south of 2100 South that provides access, for travelers from the west, to I-15 or other points east of the Union Pacific-FrontRunner railroad right-of-way; other roads in the area are blocked by Union Pacific's Roper rail yard. About two blocks east of the bridges carrying the Union Pacific railroad, FrontRunner railroad, and I-15 over the route, there is also a grade crossing with TRAX's Blue and Red lines next to Millcreek station. Just before reaching former SR-181, SR-171 becomes much steeper than at any point to the west (other than when it ducks under the Union Pacific-FrontRunner right-of-way), and from there it continues to climb the East Bench foothills until its terminus at I-215 in Millcreek.

The entire route is included as part of the National Highway System.

== History ==
3300 South/3500 South was added to the state highway system west of State Street on April 24, 1916, along with 8400 West north to 2100 South (which was already a state highway); on November 13 of that year, East 3300 South to a connection with the old Territorial Road in Parley's Canyon (also already part of the system) became a state highway. In 1919, when the state legislature redefined the state road system to include only a short list given in the law and any federal aid projects, West 3300 South remained as part of the Lincoln Highway, and became part of SR-4 and US-40 in the 1920s, but East 3300 South was given back to the county until 1935. That year, the legislature created State Route 171, occupying that street from State Street (by then designated SR-1 and US-91) east to Wasatch Boulevard (just east of present I-215). SR-210 was created in 1941, beginning at SR-4 (now I-80) at the mouth of Parley's Canyon and running south on Wasatch Boulevard to Little Cottonwood Canyon; that route was truncated in 1945, and the portion on Wasatch Boulevard between SR-171 and SR-4 became an extension of SR-171. In 1962, SR-171 was extended west to SR-111 in Magna, replacing SR-4 (which was moved to present I-80 as SR-2); in 1965, the eastern terminus was reverted to the interchange with I-215 at Wasatch Boulevard (as I-215 had replaced the purpose of Wasatch Boulevard).

== Major intersections ==
The entire route is in Salt Lake County.

| Location | mi | km | Destinations | Notes |
|---|---|---|---|---|
| Magna | 0.000 | 0.000 | SR-111 (8400 West) | Western terminus, road continues west as 3500 South |
| West Valley City | | | SR-85 (Mountain View Corridor) | |
| West Valley City | 3.506 | 5.642 | SR-172 (5600 West) | |
| West Valley City | 5.815 | 9.358 | SR-154 (Bangerter Highway) | Continuous-flow intersection |
| West Valley City | 7.227– 7.495 | 11.631– 12.062 | I-215 – Provo, Ogden | I-215 exit 18; |
| West Valley City | 8.022 | 12.910 | SR-68 (Redwood Road) | |
| South Salt Lake | 9.976– 10.035 | 16.055– 16.150 | I-15 – Ogden, Las Vegas, NV | I-15 exit 303; Single-point urban interchange |
| South Salt Lake | 10.731 | 17.270 | US 89 (State Street) | |
| South Salt Lake | 11.621 | 18.702 | SR-71 (700 East) | |
| Millcreek | 15.602– 15.660 | 25.109– 25.202 | I-215 – Provo, Reno, NV, Cheyenne, WY | Eastern terminus; I-215 exit 3; |
1.000 mi = 1.609 km; 1.000 km = 0.621 mi: Unopened

== See also ==
- List of state highways in Utah
- 3500 South MAX
