= Interstate 215 (Utah) =

Interstate Highway in Utah

Interstate 215
- Belt Route
- I-215 highlighted in red

Route information
- Auxiliary route of I-15
- Maintained by UDOT
- Length: 28.946 mi (46.584 km)
- Existed: 1963–present
- NHS: Entire route

Major junctions
- Counterclockwise end: I-80 / SR-186 in Millcreek
- SR-152 in Cottonwood Heights; US 89 in Murray; I-15 in Murray; SR-201 in West Valley City; I-80 in Salt Lake City; SR-67 in North Salt Lake
- Clockwise end: I-15 in North Salt Lake

Location
- Country: United States
- State: Utah
- Counties: Salt Lake, Davis

Highway system
- Interstate Highway System; Main; Auxiliary; Suffixed; Business; Future; Utah State Highway System; Interstate; US; State; Minor; Scenic
| ← SR-212 | → SR-218 |

Interstate 215 (I-215), also known locally as the Belt Route, is the only auxiliary Interstate in the U.S. state of Utah, forming a three-quarters loop around Salt Lake City and many of its suburbs. The route begins at the mouth of Parley's Canyon at a junction with I-80 east of the city center, and heads south through the edge of the Salt Lake City metropolitan area's eastern suburbs of Millcreek, Holladay, and Cottonwood Heights. It continues west through Murray before turning north again, passing through the city's first-ring western suburbs of Taylorsville and West Valley City. It then enters North Salt Lake and Davis County for a short distance before reaching I-15 northwest of the city center.

The Interstate was proposed in the mid-1950s, along with I-15 and I-80 through Salt Lake City. At the time, only the western portion of the belt route was assigned as I-215. The eastern portion of the belt route was designated Interstate 415. However, the I-415 designation was scrapped to provide a single route number for the entire route in 1969, with the I-215 designation covering the complete belt route. The freeway was constructed in segments, the first of which opened in 1963 between Redwood Road in North Salt Lake and 2100 North near the airport. I-215 was originally planned to be complete in the mid-1970s, but the last section, between 6200 South and 4500 South in Holladay, was not completed until 1989 because of challenges from citizens' groups over environmental impact statements.

== Route description ==
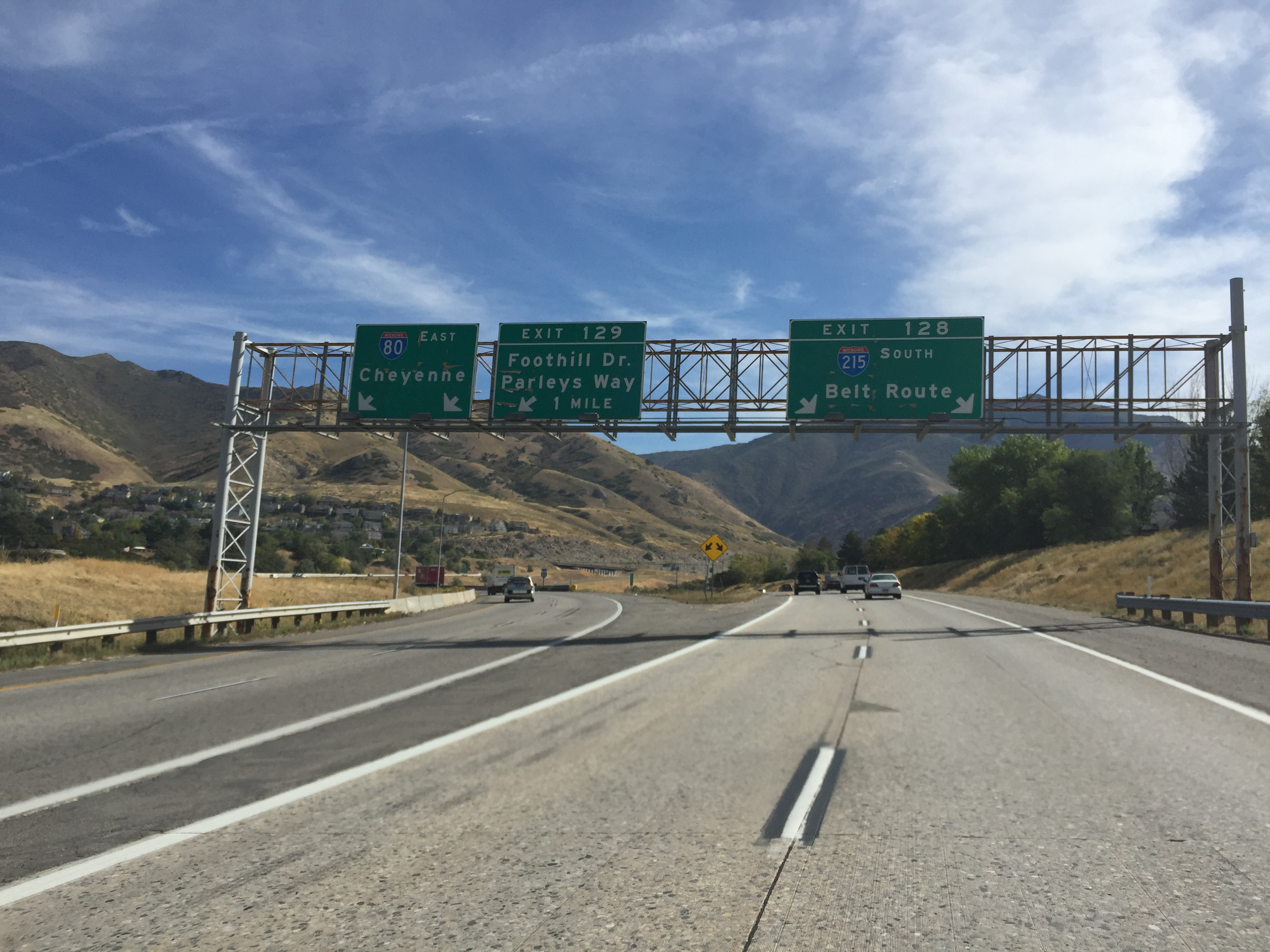
The terminus of I-215 at I-80, to the east of Salt Lake City

I-215 begins at an interchange at the mouth of Parley's Canyon in Millcreek near the southeast corner of Salt Lake City that connects I-80, Foothill Drive (State Route 186, or SR-186) and Parleys Way. At this point, I-215 splits into three legs, connecting I-80 toward Salt Lake City, Foothill Drive, and Parleys Way, and I-80 through Parley's Canyon. From here, the freeway travels southeast along the Salt Lake Valley's east bench with three lanes in each direction. The route enters a residential area of East Millcreek and turns south. Then, the first exit appears, an incomplete diamond interchange with 3300 South (SR-171) that lacks an offramp from northbound I-215. Past this interchange, an onramp connects 3800 South to northbound I-215. A block further south is a partial interchange lacking an offramp from northbound I-215 onto 3900 South. Entering Holladay, I-215 is heading south but soon turns southwest. An offramp here allows northbound motorists to connect to Wasatch Boulevard. However, this exit is signed as 3900 South and 3300 South because of the incomplete interchanges on both roads. Past an interchange at 4500 South (SR-266) that serves southbound I-215, the road turns south again and begins descending toward Knudsen's Corner and Cottonwood Heights. At this point, the southbound lanes are lower than the parallel northbound lanes. The belt route flattens out upon reaching an interchange at 6200 South at Knudsen's Corner.

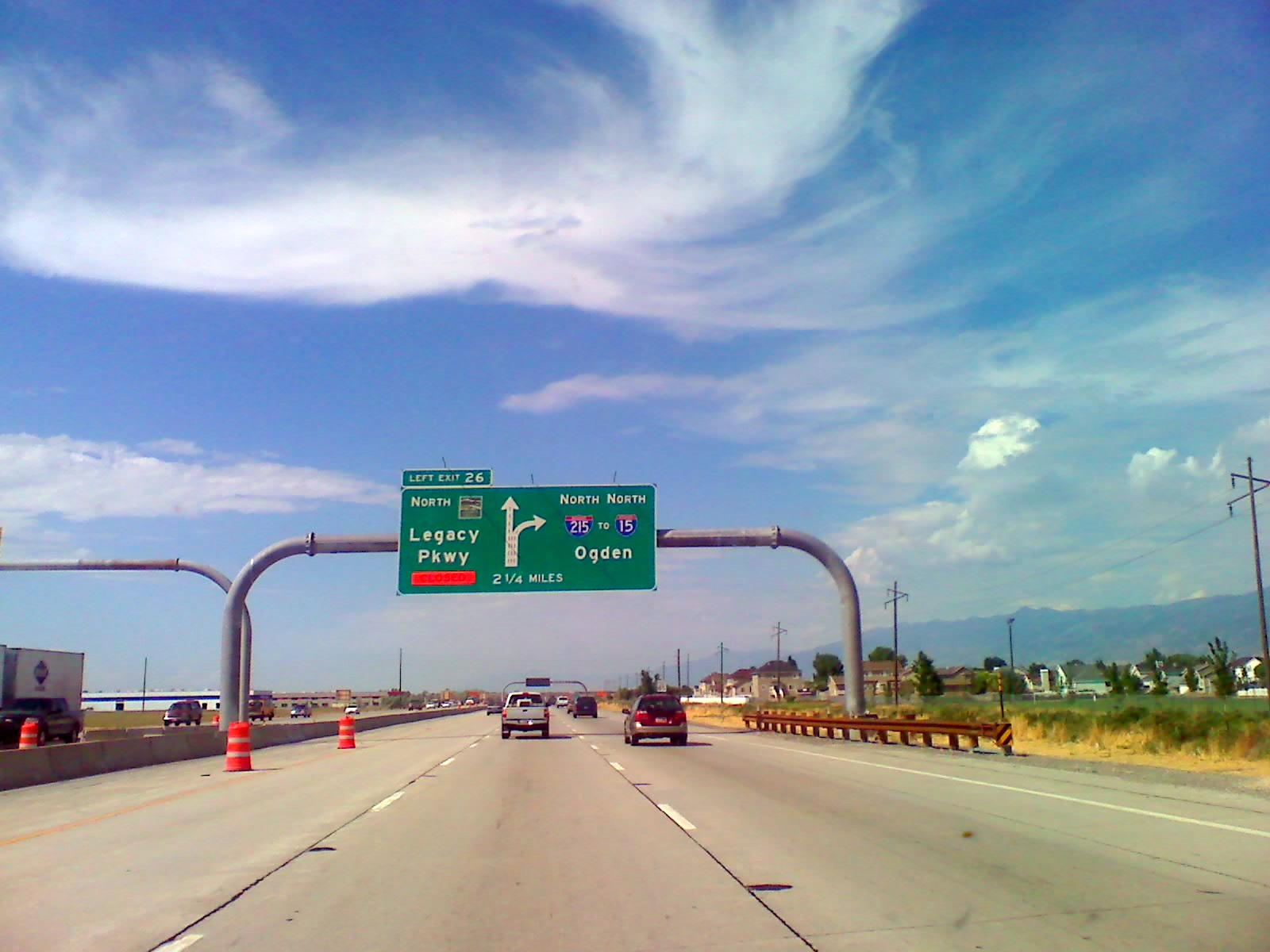
I-215 northbound approaching Legacy Parkway, to the northwest of Salt Lake City

As the freeway enters Cottonwood Heights, it turns west and becomes a sunken freeway. Then it reaches an interchange at Highland Drive, signed as 2000 East (SR-152). This interchange features a grade-separated ramp from northbound 2000 East to eastbound I-215. Past this junction, another interchange at Union Park Avenue appears. Another grade-separated ramp from Union Park Avenue is present. The freeway enters Murray as an interchange serving westbound motorists connects to 280 East and State Street (U.S. Route 89, or US-89). Eastbound travelers connect to State Street further west at a separate exit. The road turns northwest for a short time to approach a junction at I-15 (often called the South Interchange). Approaching the interchange, the route gains two lanes and reverts to a ground-level freeway. The freeway crosses I-15 and loses one lane as it enters Taylorsville and curves to the northwest, crossing the Jordan River in the process. Right before a partial cloverleaf interchange at Redwood Road (SR-68) the route turns west one final time before turning north after the interchange. The freeway continues north and has another partial cloverleaf interchange at 4700 South (SR-266). The route enters West Valley City and encounters 3500 South (SR-171), where its eastbound lanes have a grade-separated ramp to northbound I-215. The road turns northeast and enters an industrial area of western Salt Lake City. After reaching a cloverleaf interchange at SR-201, the route turns north again. Beyond a single-point urban interchange at California Avenue, the freeway continues north.

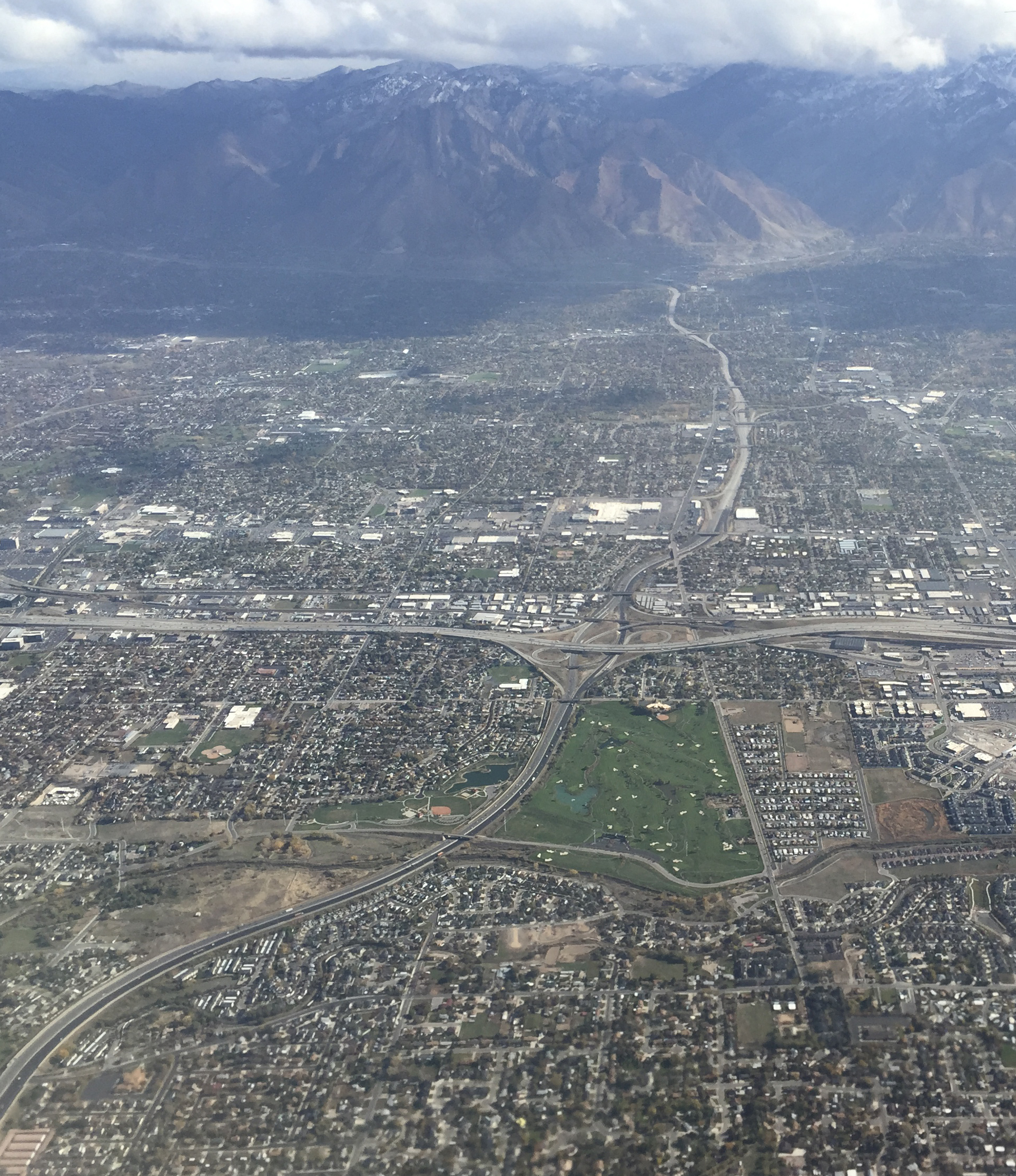
View east along the southern portion of I-215

A partial stack interchange involving I-80, Redwood Road, and the access road to Salt Lake City International Airport is next. The freeway loses one lane in each direction as the Interstate passes the airport to the east. Two diamond interchanges at 700 North and 2100 North occur as the freeway approaches Davis County. Past 2100 North, the freeway enters rural Davis County, and the road curves to the northwest. An interchange at Legacy Parkway gives northbound I-215 motorists and southbound Legacy Parkway motorists their respective connections. The road turns east and loses one lane in each direction. There is a diamond interchange at SR-68 before the highway merges into northbound I-15 in North Salt Lake.

== History ==
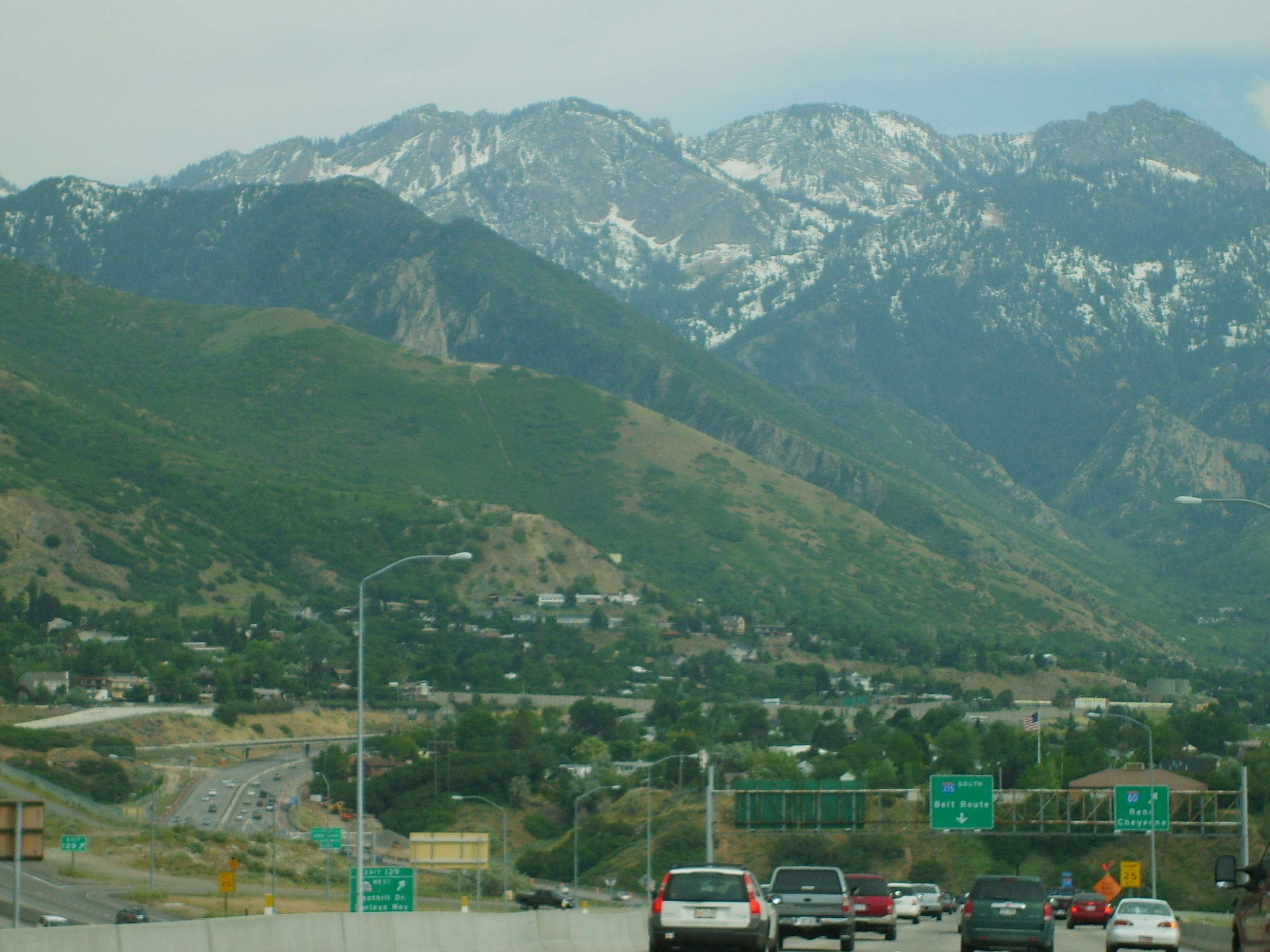
Looking southward at the southern terminus of SR-186 toward the counter-clockwise end of I-215 at the mouth of Parley's Canyon

A diagram showing the year each section of I-215 opened

A belt route around Salt Lake City was first proposed in 1955, with the Utah Highway Department (the predecessor to the present-day Utah Department of Transportation) holding hearings concerning construction beginning in early 1958. The southeast quadrant of the route was originally placed from a junction at proposed I-15 in Murray northeasterly through Murray and Holladay, eventually reaching the east bench at 3900 South. From there, it would have run north toward the mouth of Parley's Canyon at proposed I-80 (at the time US-40). Almost immediately, this plan was met with opposition among local residents in the area. The proposed route would have bisected the primarily residential Holladay suburb, as well as the southern portion of Murray. After more than two years of hearings and widespread opposition from residents, the Highway Department released their proposed routing in June 1960, which placed the southeast quadrant where it runs today. While quelling criticism from some, others remained in opposition, saying the route was still too intrusive along residential areas. The western quadrant was also admonished for being placed to close to other major arterials. In November 1963, a small, two-lane portion of the northwest quadrant of the belt route opened from Redwood Road (SR-68) in Davis County west and south to 2100 North, north of the Salt Lake City International Airport. This portion of road was extended east to I-15 in North Salt Lake and upgraded to freeway standards by 1969.

Construction of the southeast quadrant from I-80 (at the time replacing US-40) at Parley's Canyon to 4600 South in Holladay began in mid-1965. This involved realigning Wasatch Boulevard to parallel the route and truncating that road at 3300 South. Prior to this, Wasatch Boulevard connected to US-40. The section from I-80 to 3300 South opened by January 1967, with the portion of roadway from 3300 South to 4500 South opening in November 1969. When this eastern end of the highway opened in 1967, it was originally designated as Interstate 415 (I-415). The I-415 designation was anticipated to eventually apply to the entire section of what is now I-215 that is east of I-15. However, at the time the second section of this portion of the highway was opened in 1969, it was renumbered to become part of I-215 (even though the eastern end does not connect with I-15).

By 1973, construction was progressing on the western quadrant between I-15 in Murray and SR-201 (at the time U.S. Route 40 Alternate (US-40A)/US-50A). Land acquisition was also taking place for the rest of the southeastern quadrant between 300 East in Murray and 4600 South in Holladay. However, a citizens' group named Cottonwood Inc. halted right-of-way acquirements due to the lack of an environmental impact statement (EIS). Also controversial was a proposed cloverleaf interchange at 2000 East. By mid-1975, an EIS was released with four main alternatives: a no-build alternative which would leave a gap in the southeast quadrant, building the road along the modern-day path (at about 6400 South), moving the southern portion southwest through Fort Union and Midvale to 7200 South, or extending the eastern portion further south to Sandy and then west along 9000 South. Cottonwood Inc. filed a lawsuit challenging the EIS. Meanwhile, I-215 from SR-201 in the western quadrant to 280 East in Murray opened in November 1976.

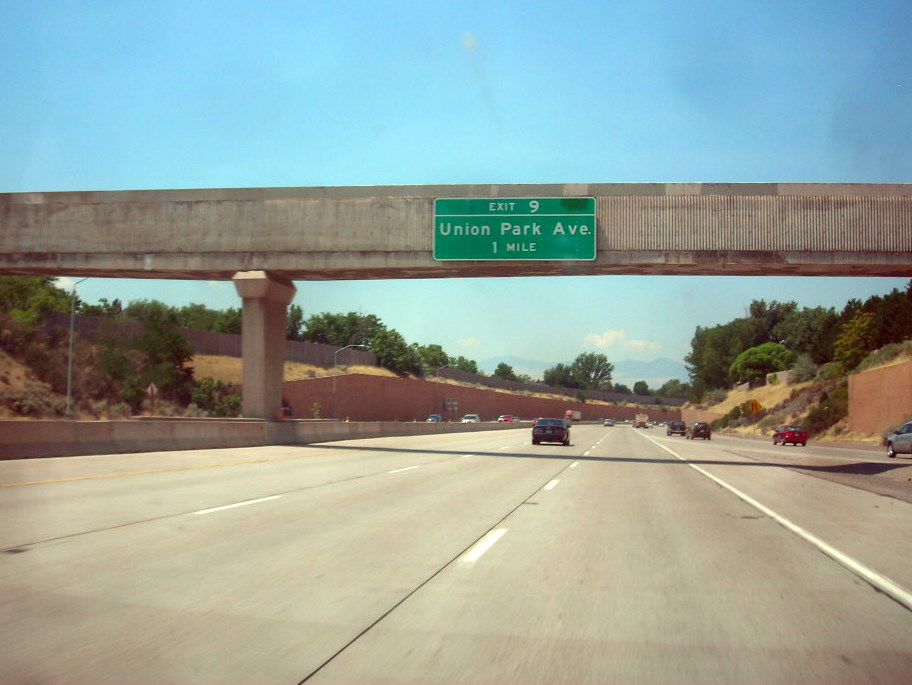
Westbound on I-215 toward the Union Park Avenue interchange

After 1976, gaps in the belt route were present from 2100 North near the airport to SR-201 and from State Street in Murray to 4600 South in Holladay. The first step in completing the gap was taken in June 1979, when construction of the Interstate from State Street to 700 East began. This was followed by the Cottonwood Inc. lawsuit being awarded in favor of UDOT in November 1979. In July 1985, the route from 280 East to Union Park Avenue was completed. At the time, this portion of road was the most expensive in the state in terms of cost per mile, due to the road being depressed below surrounding neighborhoods. The next section to open was from 2100 North south to I-80 in 1987. This was followed by a section between Union Park Avenue and 2000 East, opened in November 1987, which was also built as a sunken freeway. The western quadrant of the freeway was completed in October 1988, closing the gap between SR-201 and I-80 (however, the California Avenue interchange wasn't opened until mid-1989). In August 1989, the road from 2000 East to 6200 South was finished, and the belt route was completed with the opening of freeway between 4500 South and 6200 South in October 1989.

Since 1989, major modifications have occurred on the belt route, consisting of the rebuilding of the southern I-15 interchange in 2001, widening the freeway from six to eight lanes from 4700 South in Taylorsville to I-15 in Murray in 2004, and the addition of an interchange at Legacy Parkway in 2008. The 3300 South and 4500 South overpasses were rebuilt as well, in 2008 and 2007, respectively. In November 2017, a complete rebuild of the southwest quadrant from SR-201 to 4700 South in Taylorsville was completed. The $105 million project replaced the concrete road surface, added auxiliary lanes between exits, resurfaced and widened several bridge decks, and replaced two major bridges over SR-201.

As part of the original proposal of a belt route through Salt Lake City, the southeastern quadrant received the designation of I-415. To maintain continuity in the belt route, the 415 number was replaced in favor of the I-215 designation covering the entire route in 1969.

== Exit list ==
| County | Location | mi | km | Exit | Destinations | Notes |
|---|---|---|---|---|---|---|
| Salt Lake | Salt Lake City | 0.000 | 0.000 | | I-80 west – Reno | I-80 exit 128 |
| Salt Lake | Millcreek | 1.061 | 1.708 | 1 | SR-186 west (Foothill Drive) / Parleys Way west | No southbound exit |
| Salt Lake | Millcreek | 1.466 | 2.359 | 2 | I-80 east – Park City, Cheyenne | No southbound exit; I-80 exit 130 |
| Salt Lake | Millcreek | 1.701 | 2.737 | 3 | SR-171 (3300 South) / Wasatch Boulevard | No northbound exit |
| Salt Lake | Millcreek | 2.615 | 4.208 | 4 | 3900 South, 3300 South (Wasatch Boulevard) | |
| Salt Lake | Holladay | 3.491 | 5.618 | 5 | SR-266 (4500 South) | Southbound exit and entrance |
| Salt Lake | Holladay–Cottonwood Heights line | 6.080 | 9.785 | 6 | SR-190 (6200 South) / 3000 East – Ski areas | |
| Salt Lake | Holladay–Cottonwood Heights line | 6.080 | 9.785 | Cardinal direction change: southbound becomes westbound; eastbound becomes northbound | | |
| Salt Lake | Holladay–Cottonwood Heights line | 7.481 | 12.040 | 8 | SR-152 (2000 East) | |
| Salt Lake | Cottonwood Heights | 9.076 | 14.606 | 9 | Union Park Avenue | |
| Salt Lake | Murray | 10.205 | 16.423 | 10 | 280 East | Westbound exit and entrance |
| Salt Lake | Murray | 10.646 | 17.133 | 11 | US 89 (State Street) | Eastbound exit and entrance |
| Salt Lake | Murray | 11.256 | 18.115 | 12 | I-15 – Las Vegas, Salt Lake City | I-15 exit 298 |
| Salt Lake | Taylorsville | 13.288 | 21.385 | 13 | SR-68 (Redwood Road) | |
| Salt Lake | Taylorsville | 14.000 | 22.531 | Cardinal direction change: westbound becomes northbound; southbound becomes eastbound | | |
| Salt Lake | Taylorsville | 15.258 | 24.555 | 15 | SR-266 (4700 South) – Taylorsville | |
| Salt Lake | West Valley City | 17.351– 17.571 | 27.924– 28.278 | 18 | SR-171 (3500 South) – Maverik Center, West Valley City | Signed as exits 18A (east) and 18B (west) northbound |
| Salt Lake | Salt Lake City | 19.232– 19.625 | 30.951– 31.583 | 20 | SR-201 to I-80 – Magna, Reno, Cheyenne | Cloverleaf interchange, signed as exits 20A (east) and 20B (west); SR 201 exits 15A-B; northbound entrance includes direct entrance ramp from SR-68 (Redwood Road) |
| Salt Lake | Salt Lake City | 20.396 | 32.824 | 21 | California Avenue | |
| Salt Lake | Salt Lake City | 21.764 | 35.026 | 22 | I-80 / Redwood Road (SR-68) – Cheyenne, Salt Lake City International Airport, Reno | Signed as exits 22A (west) and 22B (east) southbound; I-80 exit 117 |
| Salt Lake | Salt Lake City | 23.365 | 37.602 | 23 | 700 North | |
| Salt Lake | Salt Lake City | 25.341 | 40.782 | 25 | 2100 North | |
| Salt Lake | Salt Lake City | 26.701 | 42.971 | 26 | SR-67 north (Legacy Parkway) | Northbound left exit and southbound left entrance |
| Davis | North Salt Lake | 27.115 | 43.637 | 27 | SR-68 (Redwood Road) | Diverging diamond interchange |
| Davis | North Salt Lake | 28.946 | 46.584 | | I-15 north – Ogden | Northbound exit and southbound entrance; I-15 exit 313 |
1.000 mi = 1.609 km; 1.000 km = 0.621 mi: Incomplete access
