= Utah State Route 201 =

Highway in Utah

State Route 201
- Map of SR-201 (delineated in red)

Route information
- Maintained by UDOT
- Length: 18.095 mi (29.121 km)
- Existed: 1939–present

Major junctions
- West end: I-80 near Magna
- SR-202 near Magna; SR-111 in Magna; SR-172 in West Valley City; SR-154 in Salt Lake City; I-215 in West Valley City; SR-68 in West Valley City; I-15 / I-80 in South Salt Lake
- East end: US 89 in Salt Lake City/South Salt Lake

Location
- Country: United States
- State: Utah

Highway system
- Utah State Highway System; Interstate; US; State; Minor; Scenic
← SR-200	→ SR-202

State Route 201 (SR-201) is an east–west expressway and freeway located in Salt Lake County in the U.S. state of Utah. Colloquially known by some as the 21st South Freeway, the route serves as an alternative to Interstate 80 (I-80) through Salt Lake City. From the western terminus of the route west of Magna, the highway heads east through Kennecott Copper property as an expressway before running through the western suburbs of Salt Lake City as a freeway. Shortly after the route returns on a surface route, SR-201 terminates on its eastern end at State Street (U.S. Route 89).

The history of the route predates the invention of the automobile; the Donner Party, California Trail and Pony Express all followed the present-day path of the highway. During the 1910s, the route was designated a state highway and, in 1939, State Route 201 was officially written into law, running from Magna east to the mouth of Parley's Canyon. At one point, the highway carried US-50 Alternate west of State Street and both US-40 and US-40 Alternate east of that road, though all were truncated from Salt Lake City by the late 1970s. Construction of the freeway portion of SR-201 west of I-15 commenced in the mid-1960s and was fully completed by 1986.

== Route description ==
At its western terminus, SR-201 begins at a partial interchange at I-80. Heading generally east with two lanes in each direction, the expressway passes by the Kennecott Smokestack, the tallest structure in Utah. Past its intersection at SR-202, the route takes a turn to the southeast, bypassing the Kennecott tailings pond. Now exiting Kennecott property, the route exits unpopulated terrain and enters the urban Wasatch Front, beginning with the Salt Lake City suburb of Magna. Past junctions at 9200 West, 8400 West, 8000 West and 7200 West, the route veers northerly three blocks and becomes a limited-access freeway. East of 7200 West, SR-201 is routed at approximately 2100 South in Salt Lake County's grid system, giving the freeway its nickname of "21st South Freeway".

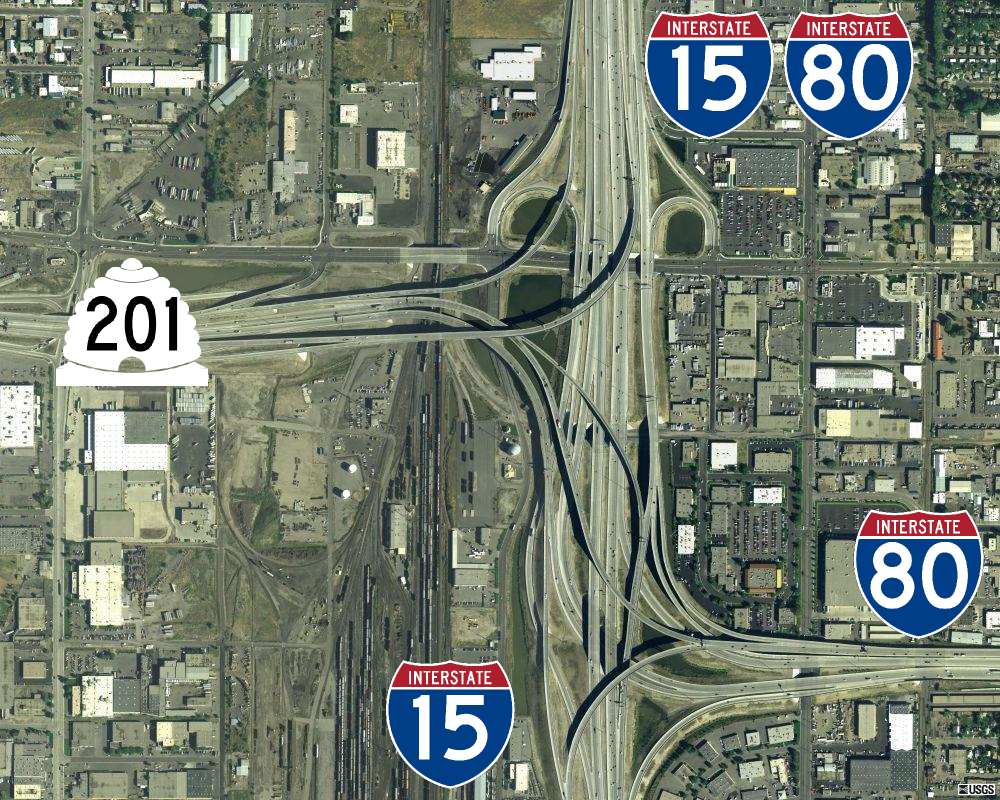
The intersection of SR-201, I-15, and I-80, locally known as the "Spaghetti Bowl"

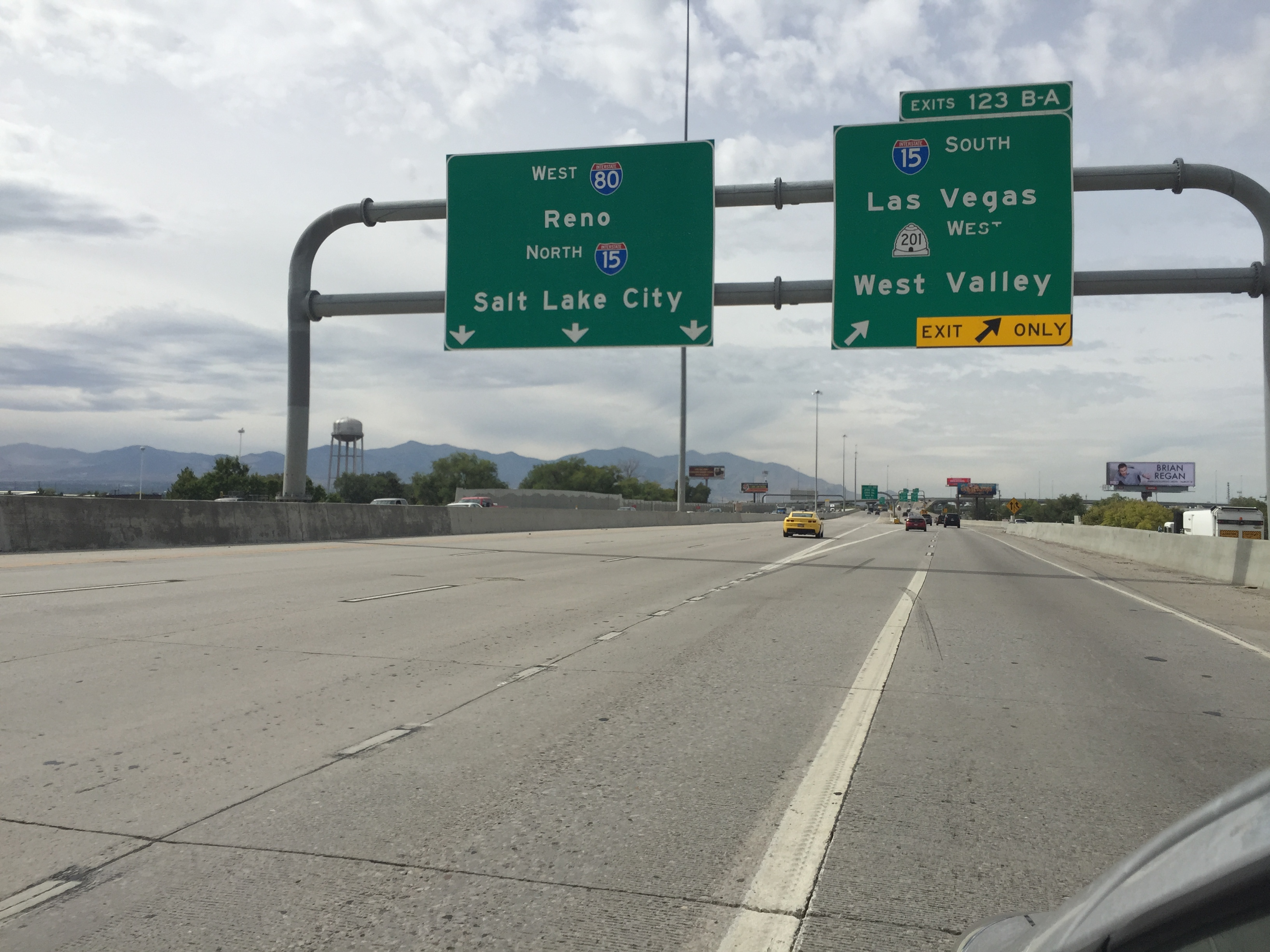
View west from the east end of SR-201

Now with three lanes in each direction, the highway straddles the boundary between Salt Lake City and West Valley City, another suburb of the former. The road continues due east with diamond interchanges at 5600 West (SR-172) and Bangerter Highway (SR-154). Immediately following a single-point urban interchange (SPUI) at 3200 West, the freeway intersects I-215 in the form of a cloverleaf interchange. The road dips to the south slightly and, following two SPUIs at Redwood Road (SR-68) and 900 West, the freeway terminates at the Spaghetti Bowl interchange, giving eastbound motorists on SR-201 the option of continuing to I-15, I-80, 1300 South and 900 South. However, an eastbound traveler wanting to continue on the surface portion of SR-201 to State Street must exit on 900 West, head north briefly and then turn eastbound on 2100 South; a westbound traveler on 2100 South wishing to connect to the freeway must take an on-ramp from the surface street just before 900 West. Prior to 1997, this connection was direct. Now on the four-lane 2100 South, a secondary surface street, the route runs along the Salt Lake City-South Salt Lake border. State maintenance of 2100 South ends at the intersection of State Street (US-89).

== History ==
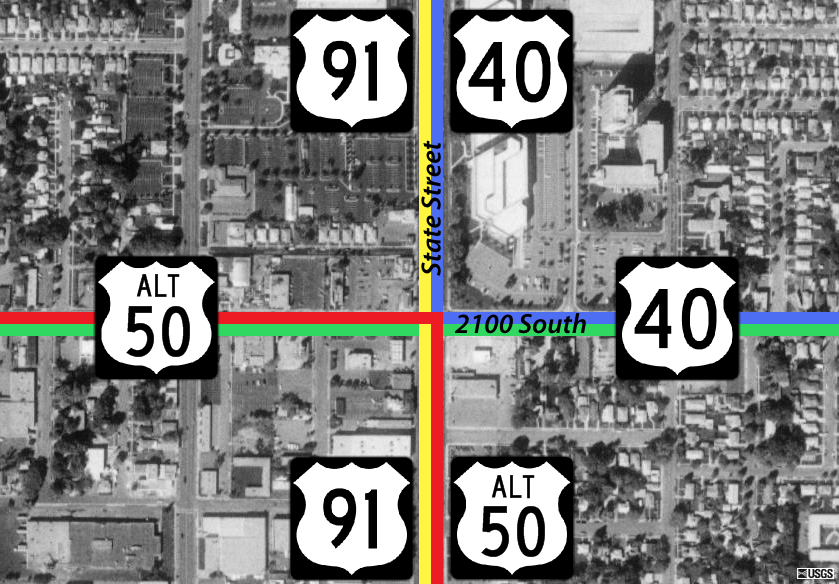
An aerial photo of the intersection of SR-201 and present-day US-89 (State Street) US-40A (1965–1976) US-89/US-91 (until 1974) US-50A (1953–1979) US-40 (until 1965)

State Route 201 is one of the original highways through the Salt Lake Valley. Signs along the route claim the path of the highway to be the historical route of the California Trail, Pony Express and Lincoln Highway. While signed as the route of the California Trail, modern 2100 South is a less common branch called Hastings Cutoff that became infamous because of the Donner Party. The Lincoln Highway, generally derived from the route of the Pony Express across Utah, was routed on 2100 South. However, no modern highway exactly follows the route of the Pony Express west of Salt Lake City. SR-201 is one of a few auto-tour routes that approximates the Pony Express trail, which actually ran south of the road.

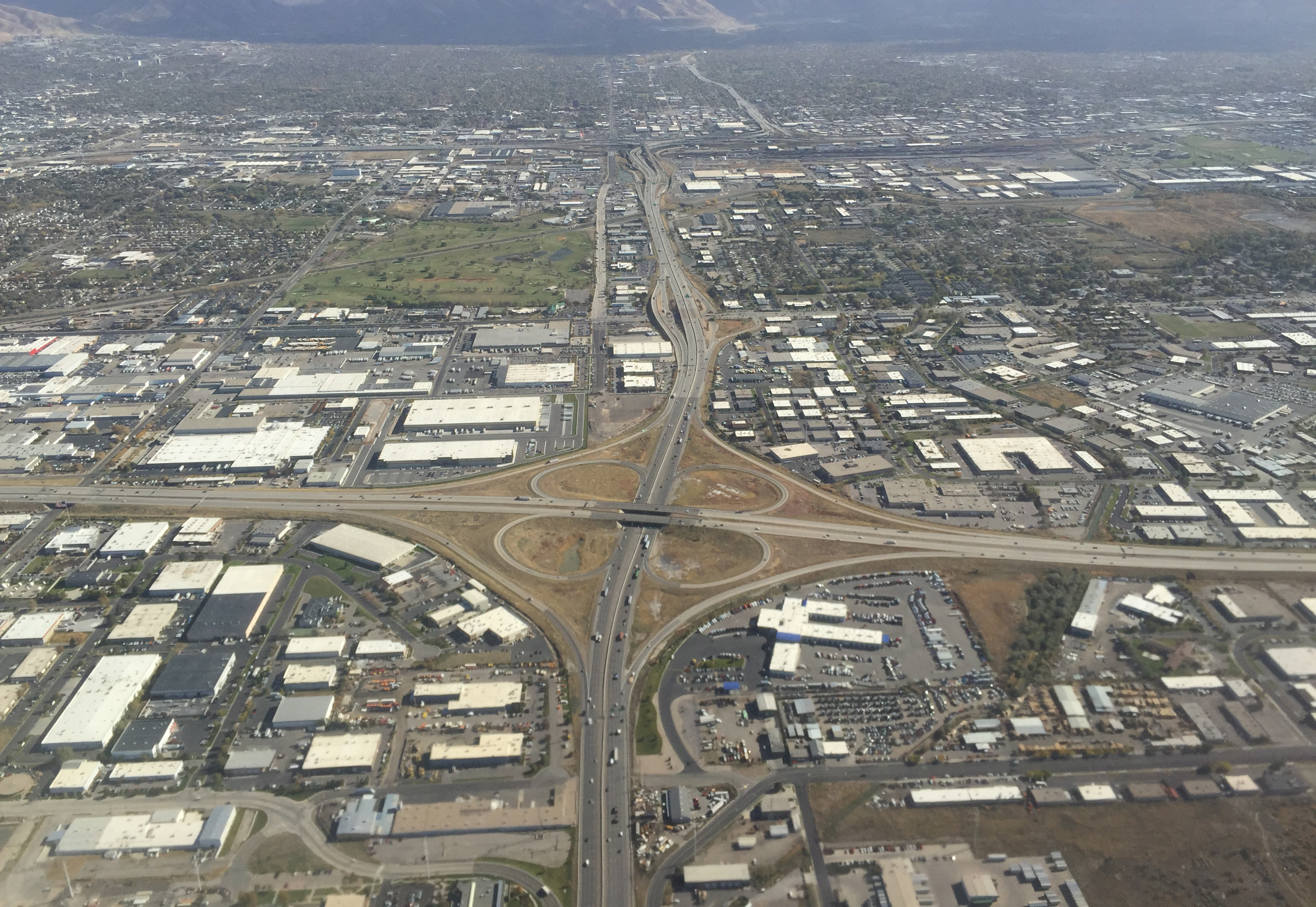
View east along SR-201 at I-215

In the 1910s, 2100 South in Salt Lake County became an unnumbered state highway. In 1919, when the state legislature redefined the state road system to include only a short list given in the law and any federal aid projects, 2100 South east of State Street remained as a portion of the Lincoln Highway. In 1926, 2100 South became part of US-40, following the creation of the United States Numbered Highway system. By 1937, 2100 South west of 9180 West was assigned to US-50, US-40 now turning northward toward Downtown Salt Lake City. This created two signed highways over 2100 South: US-40 east of US-91 and US-50 east of 9200 West (US-50 traveled west on 3500 South through Salt Lake City from US-91 to 2100 South in Magna, whereas US-40 turned from eastbound 2100 South to northbound State Street to connect to North Temple).

In 1939, the state legislature designated State Route 201, running west on 2100 South from State Street (US-40/US-91) to US-50 (9180 West) in Magna. By 1954, US-50 was moved south to an alignment through central Utah, the old routing mostly replaced by US-50 Alternate (US-50A). However, US-50A was placed in Salt Lake City on 2100 South west of State Street, replacing the SR-201 designation. By 1965, US-40 was realigned along Foothill Drive (then US-40A), the Utah Highway Department believing the Foothill route was more direct in connecting with North Temple toward the airport. US-40A was now aligned along the entirety of 2100 South from US-40/future I-215 at the mouth of Parley's Canyon west to State Street and beyond with US-50A to US-40 west of Magna. Both mainline and Alternate US-40, along with US-50A, were truncated to east of the city by 1979.

=== Constructing a freeway ===
By 1958, SR-201 between US-40 west of Magna and SR-68 (Redwood Road) was a two-lane highway through rural Salt Lake County. The rural landscape changed by the time SR-201 intersected 300 West and entered urban Salt Lake County, the highway becoming a four-lane road. The route remained this way until the intersection of 1300 East (SR-181), where the route reverted to a two-lane configuration. By 1965, a time when most U.S. Routes in the city were being replaced by Interstate Highways, all two-lane portions of the road east of 1300 East were widened to at least four lanes; an interchange between US-40, US-40A and future I-215 was being built at the mouth of Parley's Canyon. From under-construction I-15 west to Redwood Road, the old route of SR-201 was being superseded by a six-lane freeway directly to the south. All construction was complete by 1970 with interchanges at 900 West and Redwood Road; the new freeway extended west to 2700 West.

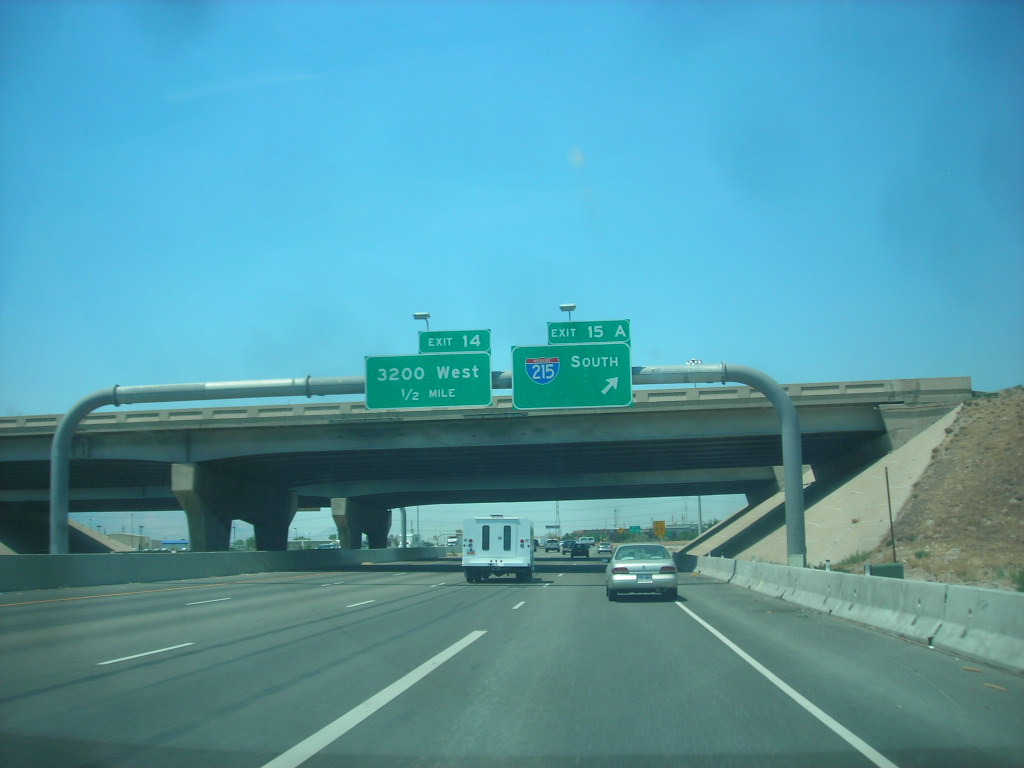
SR-201 approaching I-215 interchange

By 1977, an interchange directly west of Redwood Road at I-215 was being built and the rest of the highway to Magna was given a median in preparation for freeway construction to 5600 West (SR-172). This construction concluded by 1986, with interchanges at 3200 West, Bangerter Highway (SR-154, then solely 4000 West) and 5600 West as a result. Beginning in April 1997 and concluding in July 2001, as part of a larger reconstruction project for I-15, SR-201 was rebuilt from 900 West to I-15/I-80, including the colloquial "Spaghetti Bowl" interchange. As a result, SR-201 was left in two discontinuous pieces; to connect from the surface portion of SR-201 to the freeway, one must now take an on-ramp. From 2004 to 2006, the freeway from 900 West to I-215 was widened and repaved, the Redwood Road interchange being redone as well. In 2009, the freeway from Bangerter Highway to 5600 West was widened to three lanes in each direction and the road between SR-202 and I-80 was widened to four lanes—the latter project eliminated the final two-lane section of SR-201.

== Major intersections ==
The entire route is in Salt Lake County.

Location	mi	km	Exit	Destinations	Notes
Lake Point Junction	0.000	0.000		I-80 west – Reno	No access to I-80 east
Garfield	3.250	5.230		SR-202 to I-80 east – Great Salt Lake State Park	
Magna	7.179	11.553		SR-111 (8400 West) – Magna, Bingham Canyon Mine	Seagull intersection
Magna	7.683	12.365		8000 West	
Magna	8.684	13.976		7200 West	At-grade intersection; west end of freeway
West Valley City–Salt Lake City line			10	SR-85 (Mountain View Corridor)	Signed as exits 10A (south) and 10B (north) westbound
West Valley City–Salt Lake City line	10.805	17.389	11	SR-172 (5600 West)	
West Valley City–Salt Lake City line	12.821	20.633	13	SR-154 (Bangerter Highway) – West Valley City	
Salt Lake City	13.760	22.145	14	3200 West	Single-point urban interchange, first in Utah
Salt Lake City–West Valley City line	14.418	23.204	15A-B	I-215	
Salt Lake City–West Valley City line	15.287	24.602	15C	SR-68 (Redwood Road)	
South Salt Lake	16.414	26.416	17	900 West	
South Salt Lake	16.699	26.874	—	I-15 north / I-80 west (Veteran's Memorial Highway) – Salt Lake City, Reno	Eastbound exit and westbound entrance; part of the "Spaghetti Bowl" interchange; exit includes direct exit ramp onto 1300 South/900 South, entrance includes direct entrance ramp from 2100 South
South Salt Lake	16.699	26.874	—	I-15 south (Veteran's Memorial Highway) – Las Vegas	Eastbound exit and westbound entrance; part of the "Spaghetti Bowl" interchange
South Salt Lake	16.699	26.874		I-80 east – Cheyenne	
Implied connection to 2100 South via 900 West
Salt Lake City–South Salt Lake line	16.700	26.876		900 West	
Salt Lake City–South Salt Lake line	16.970	27.311		To SR-201 west – West Valley	Direct ramp from 2100 South to westbound SR-201 freeway
Salt Lake City–South Salt Lake line	17.169– 17.424	27.631– 28.041		I-15 / I-80 west – Salt Lake City, Las Vegas, Reno	Partial cloverleaf interchange
Salt Lake City–South Salt Lake line	17.536	28.221		300 West	Former SR-176
Salt Lake City–South Salt Lake line	18.095	29.121		US 89 (State Street)	Eastern terminus
1.000 mi = 1.609 km; 1.000 km = 0.621 mi: Incomplete access; Unopened
