= Utah State Route 266 =

State highway in Utah, United States

State Route 266
- 4700 South/4500 South

Route information
- Maintained by UDOT
- Length: 8.120 mi (13.068 km)
- Existed: 1959–present

Major junctions
- West end: I-215 in Taylorsville
- SR-68 in Taylorsville; I-15 in Murray; US 89 in Murray; SR-71 in Murray; I-215 in Holladay
- East end: Wasatch Boulevard in Holladay

Location
- Country: United States
- State: Utah

Highway system
- Utah State Highway System; Interstate; US; State; Minor; Scenic
← SR-265	→ SR-268

State Route 266 is a west–east thoroughfare completely within Salt Lake County in northern Utah that connects both sides of the I-215 beltway. It is known as 4500 South and 4700 South along the route.

== Route description ==
SR-266 begins at a partial cloverleaf interchange with I-215 in Taylorsville and travels east on 4700 South. After passing through the center of Taylorsville and an intersection with SR-68, the highway veers northeast near the Fore Lakes Golf Course and passes through residential neighborhoods and an office park. It continues east onto 4500 South, crossing over the Jordan River into Murray and intersecting I-15 in a single-point urban interchange. SR-266 then descends into a trenched highway, crossing under a mainline railroad carrying freight traffic and FrontRunner commuter trains, a driveway, and the TRAX light rail near Murray North station. The highway then intersects US-89 before continuing into Murray's suburban neighborhoods, passing several parks and sportsfields. SR-266 enters Holladay and veers slightly to the north before ascending into the Holladay Hills, where it intersects I-215 again and terminates.

The entire route is included as part of the National Highway System.

== History ==
The State Road Commission designated SR-266 in 1959 as a mostly-proposed roadway, connecting SR-68 and SR-71 with a planned interchange on I-15. The corresponding section of SR-174, just to the south, was removed from the state highway system, as it would not give access to I-15. The state legislature extended the route west and east to both sides of the I-215 loop in 1969.

== Major intersections ==
County	Location	mi	km	Destinations	Notes
Salt Lake	Taylorsville	0.000	0.000	I-215 – Provo, Ogden	Western terminus
Salt Lake	Taylorsville	0.777	1.250	SR-68 (Redwood Road)	
Salt Lake	Murray	2.844	4.577	I-15 – Provo, Salt Lake City	
Salt Lake	Murray	3.536	5.691	US 89 (State Street)	
Salt Lake	Murray	4.422	7.117	SR-71 (700 East)	
Salt Lake	Holladay	8.048	12.952	I-215 – Park City	
Salt Lake	Holladay	8.120	13.068	Wasatch Boulevard	Eastern terminus
1.000 mi = 1.609 km; 1.000 km = 0.621 mi
