= List of Interstate Highways in Utah =

- Highway markers for Interstate Highways
- Interstate Highways highlighted in red

Highway names
- Interstates: Interstate nn (I-nn)

System links
- Utah State Highway System; Interstate; US; State; Minor; Scenic

The Interstate Highways in Utah are maintained by the Utah Department of Transportation (UDOT). The Interstate Highway System is a nationwide system with only a small portion of these routes entering Utah. Originally, the State Road Commission of Utah, created on March 23, 1909 was responsible for maintenance, but these duties were rolled into the new UDOT in 1975. There are 977.664 miles (1,573.398 km) of Interstates within the state. The longest is Interstate 15 (I-15) at 400.592 miles (644.690 km) and the shortest is I-215 at 28.946 miles (46.584 km). One unique former route is Interstate 415, which was never signed as such, and was only used as a temporary designation for the eastern portion of what is now the Interstate 215 belt loop around Salt Lake City.

== List ==
Number	Length (mi)	Length (km)	Southern or western terminus	Northern or eastern terminus	Formed	Removed	Notes
I-15	400.592	644.690	I-15 at the Arizona state line towards Littlefield	I-15 at the Idaho state line towards Malad City	1956	current	I-15 crosses through the entire state, starting in the south from Saint George, up through the middle of the state where it intersects I-70, and into the Salt Lake Valley to meet with I-215 and I-80. After leaving the valley, I-15 continues north, where it becomes concurrent with I-84 until the split in Tremonton, where I-15 heads north into Idaho.
I-70	231.673	372.842	I-15 near Cove Fort	I-70/US 6/US 50 at the Colorado state line towards Grand Junction	1957	current	Interstate 70 begins in Utah near Cove Fort, not passing through any major metropolitan areas of Utah, and serves as a long-haul route to Denver and the east coast. A stretch of 110 miles (180 km) exists on the highway without any services available.
I-80	196.680	316.526	I-80 at the Nevada state line in Wendover	I-80/US 189 at the Wyoming state line towards Evanston	1956	current	Interstate 80 enters from Wendover and crosses the Bonneville Salt Flats before entering the Salt Lake Valley, briefly becoming concurrent with I-15 before leaving the valley through Parley's Canyon, meeting the end of I-84 and enters Wyoming.
I-80N	—	—	I-80N at the Idaho state line towards Burley	I-80 near Echo	1958	1977	Now I-84
I-84	119.773	192.756	I-84 at the Idaho state line towards Burley	I-80 near Echo	1977	current	I-84 enters in Snowville and soon becomes concurrent with I-15 until it splits off in Roy, and enters Weber Canyon before ending at I-80 in Echo
I-215	28.946	46.584	I-80 at Parley's Canyon	I-15 in North Salt Lake	1963	current	270 degree belt route around Salt Lake City
I-415	—	—	I-15/I-215 in Murray	I-80 in Salt Lake City	1959	1969	Now I-215
Former

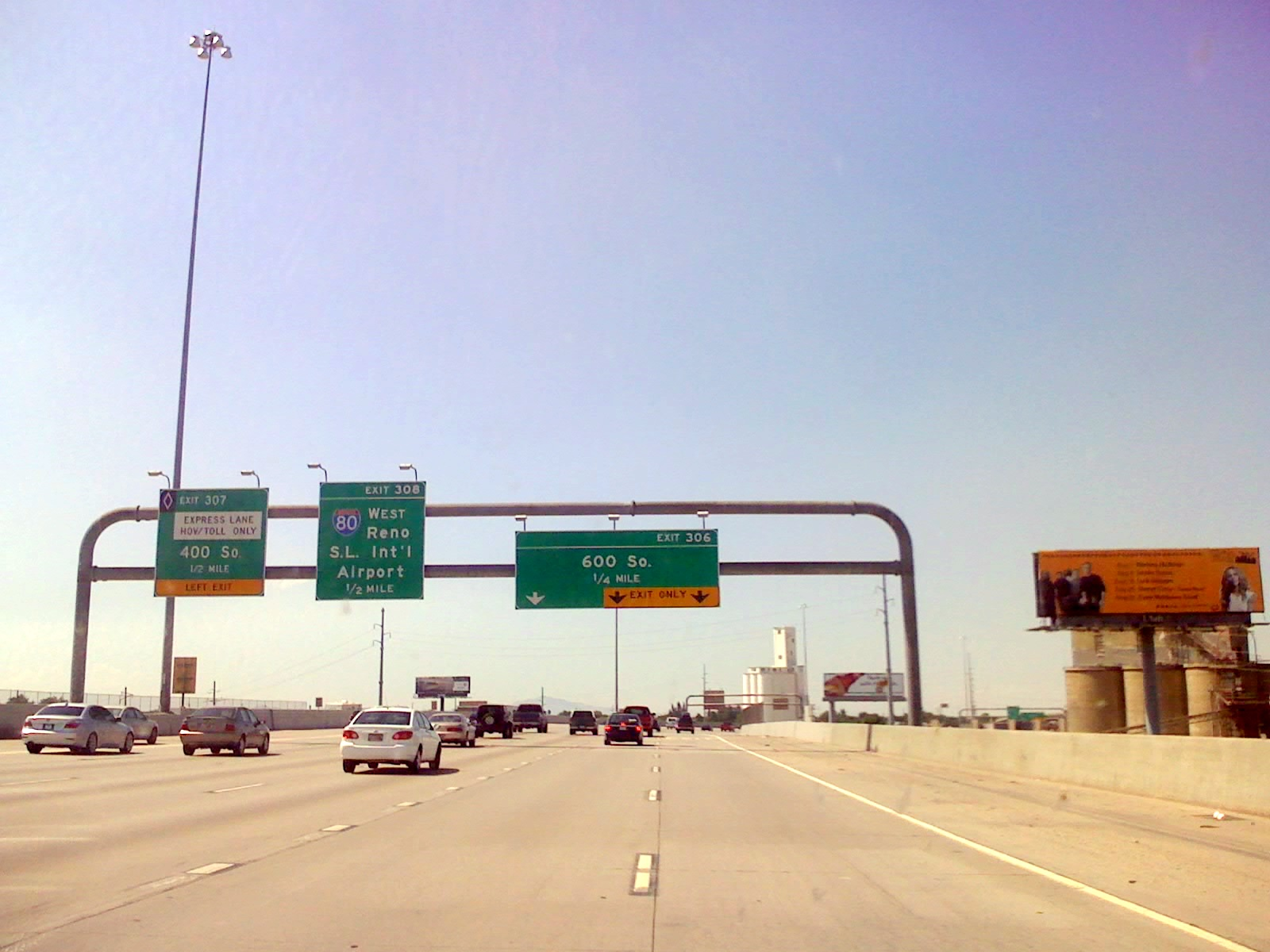
I-15 in Salt Lake City

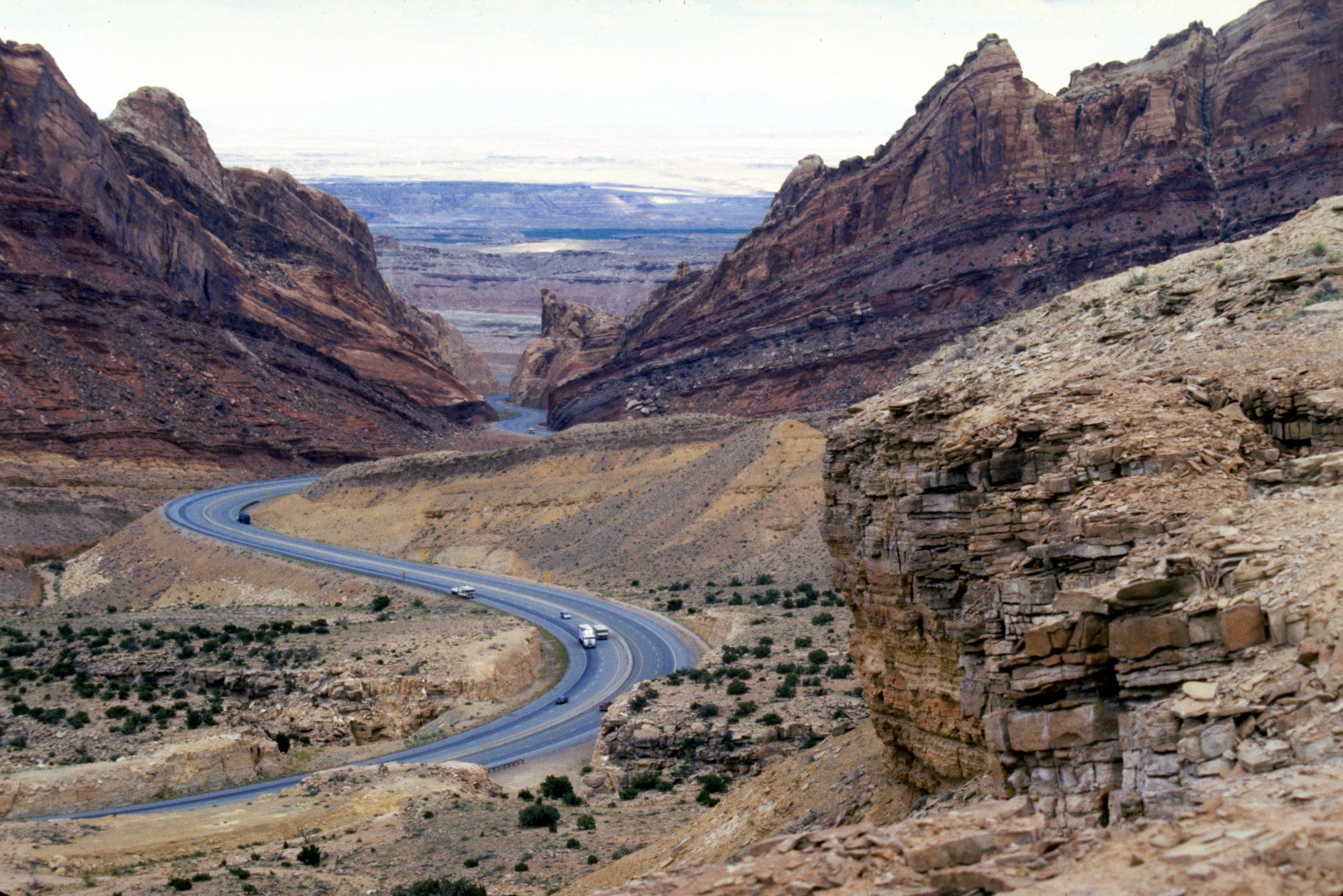
I-70 through Spotted Wolf Canyon

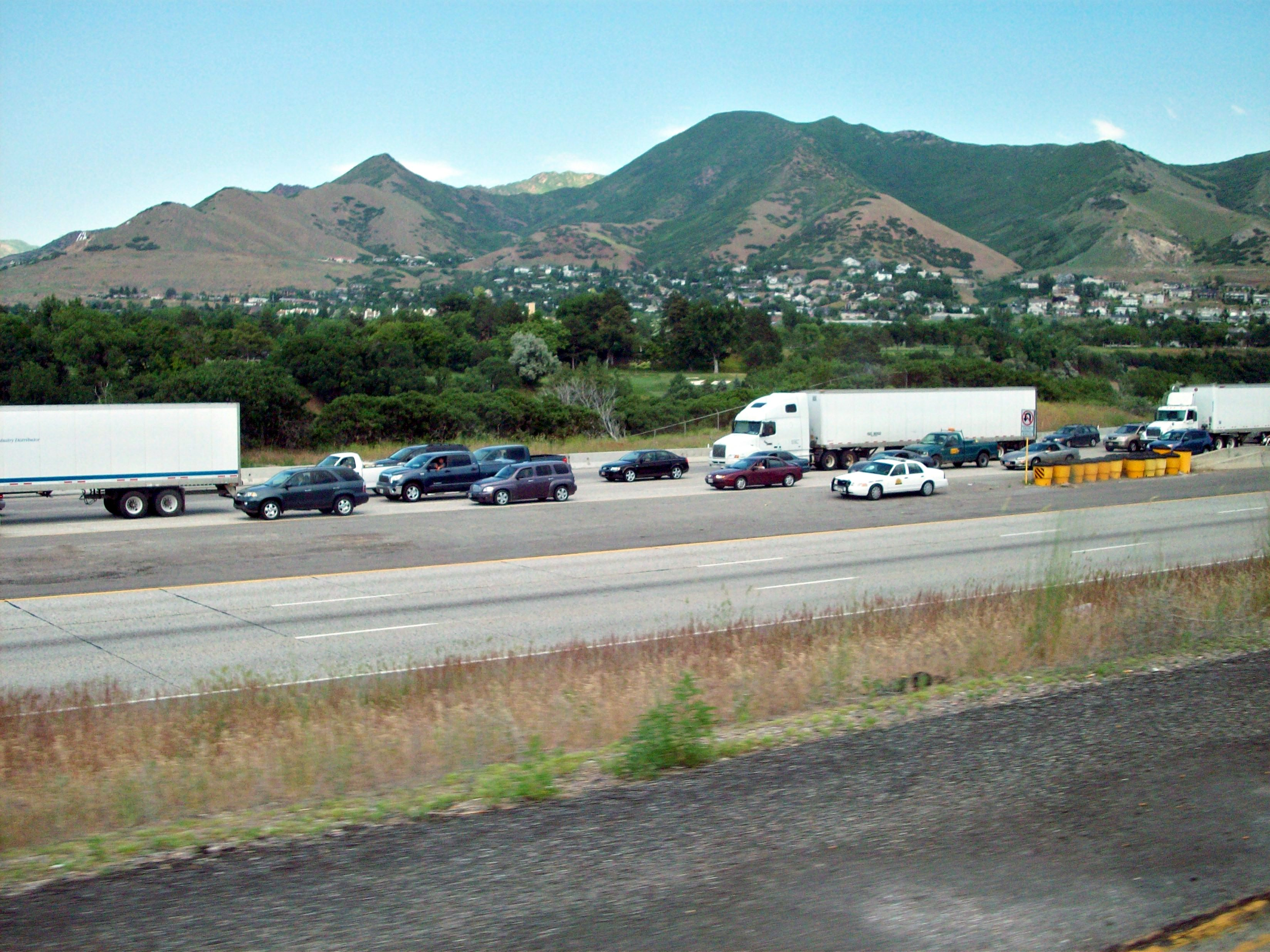
I-80 approaching road construction in Salt Lake City
