= Utah State Route 176 (1933–1969) =

Former state highway in Utah, United States

State Route 176

Route information
- Existed: 1935–1969

Major junctions
- South end: SR-171 in South Salt Lake
- East end: US 89 in Salt Lake City

Location
- Country: United States
- State: Utah

Highway system
- Utah State Highway System; Interstate; US; State; Minor; Scenic

Utah State Route 176 was a state highway in entirely within the cities of Salt Lake City and South Salt Lake in Salt Lake County, Utah, United States. It mainly functioned as an alternate route for US-89, US-91, and I-15 traffic that provided access to industrial areas of the two cities and avoided urban cross-traffic in Downtown Salt Lake City. The original route followed 900 South west from State Street (Salt Lake County) (concurrent US-89 and US-91) to 300 West and then traveled north on 300 West to meet US-89 and US-91 again at South Temple (or, later, at North Temple). The route was subsequently changed to follow 300 West only: it followed 300 West all the way from 3300 South (SR-171) to North Temple (traffic from either I-15 or State Street could reach the southern end along short stretches of SR-171).

Before the mid-20th century, 300 West was confusingly known as Second West, based on the idea of numbering streets from the nearest corner of Temple Square rather than just from the southeast corner (which is the only origin recognized by the modern Salt Lake County addressing system).

== Route description ==
=== 300 West ===
From 1967 to 1969, SR-176 started at an intersection with SR-171 in South Salt Lake only about a block east of I-15 and proceeded straight north as a four-lane (plus, as of 2012, a center turn lane) road without continuous sidewalks (300 West continues south of this point before swerving east to avoid crossing the FrontRunner and Union Pacific railroad corridor (Rio Grande's Utah Division during the 1960s) at an acute angle and connects to a short frontage road of 3900 South, but was never a state highway). The road runs down the middle of an isolated strip of land cut off from its surroundings by I-15 on the west and the TRAX light rail line (previously Union Pacific's mainline to Provo) on the east; the freeway is always between a block and two blocks to the west and the rail line is exactly a block to the east. The area is occupied almost totally by industrial and specialized wholesale businesses that benefit from relatively easy access to the freeway (and, in some cases, the railroad's freight service) without suffering from the difficulty in access from surrounding neighborhoods.

300 West passes under I-80 about a mile north of SR-171, and then crosses the TRAX Green Line (originally Rio Grande's line to Park City) before intersecting SR-201 (2100 South), the first major east-west street north of 3300 South, and enters Salt Lake City. Due to the east-west traffic and the easy access from the major freeway crossing just to the west, this area has many big box stores (as of 2012). Further north, the surroundings revert to mainly industrial and wholesale uses. North of 1700 South, the route crosses the former Salt Lake and Utah Railroad right-of-way. Near 1300 South (the next street north of 2100 South to provide freeway access), there are (as of 2012) several more big box stores, and, where not taken up by the big box stores, the surroundings begin to have a more varied mix of uses, including local retail. As of 2011, the road gains continuous sidewalks in this area. Though the TRAX line remains exactly a block to the east until 700 South, the former Union Pacific mainline that it uses south of 1300 South curves west and crosses 300 West at Brooklyn Avenue; since this mainline lost its connection to the north in about 2000, it is now only a minor freight spur. Just a few yards (meters) north of the rail crossing, the street passes under the long elevated ramps connecting the concurrent interstates 15 and 80 to West Temple, SR-270.

About a block further north, in the Granary District neighborhood, 1967-1969 SR-176 joins its 1935-1967 route, which came from the east on 900 South. SR-176 continued north on 300 West from this intersection throughout its history. The route passes the historic Fifth Ward Meetinghouse, then intersects eastbound SR-269 at 600 South. From approximately 1963 to 2000, this intersection was grade separated, but it is now an ordinary signalized intersection (though unusual for Salt Lake City since 600 South is one-way). One block further north, 300 West intersects westbound SR-269; unlike at 600 South, this intersection was never grade separated. North of the intersection with 400 South next to Pioneer Park, 300 West now carries US-89; for the description of the last four- or five-block stretch of former SR-176, see US-89 (UT).

=== 900 South ===
SR-176 extended for four blocks (0.5 mile or 800 meters) along 900 South from 1935 to 1967. From 300 West, the modern street proceeds east with four lanes, sidewalks and a center turn lane. At 200 West (once known as First West), it crosses tracks (in 200 West's median) used by all three of the Utah Transit Authority's light rail lines, directly south of the 900 South station. This line was originally the Salt Lake and Utah interurban line, and continued to be used for local freight after most of the route to Utah County was abandoned. At West Temple (100 West), 900 South intersects SR-270 right as the bridges connecting that route to interstates 15 and 80 end. Former SR-176 then crosses Main Street before the state highway designation ended at modern US-89 (State Street). The state highway included only a short segment of 900 South, which extends as a continuous city street (entirely in Salt Lake City) from the Jordan River to near SR-186 at the mouth of Emigration Canyon.

== Major intersections ==
The entire route was in Salt Lake County.

Location	mi	km	Destinations	Notes
South Salt Lake			SR-171 (West 3300 South)	Southern terminus
Salt Lake City			SR-201 (West 2100 South)	
Salt Lake City			SR-269 (West 600 South)	
Salt Lake City			US 89 (West North Temple Street/North 300 West)	Northern terminus
1.000 mi = 1.609 km; 1.000 km = 0.621 mi

== See also ==
- List of state highways in Utah
- List of highways numbered 176
