= Utah State Route 93 =

Highway in Utah, US

State Route 93
- 2600 South

Route information
- Maintained by UDOT
- Length: 0.355 mi (571 m)
- Existed: 1961–present

Major junctions
- West end: I-15 in Woods Cross
- East end: US 89 in Woods Cross

Location
- Country: United States
- State: Utah

Highway system
- Utah State Highway System; Interstate; US; State; Minor; Scenic
| ← SR-92 | → SR-94 |

State Route 93 (SR-93) is a state highway in the US state of Utah providing a connection from I-15 to US-89. The highway is completely in the city limits of Woods Cross, spanning 0.37 miles (0.60 km). The entire route is routed along 2600 South. It was formed in 1965 coinciding with the construction of I-15 through the area. At the time of formation, the route at the eastern terminus was legislatively designated SR-106, though it was signed as US-89 and US-91. US-91 was decommissioned in 1974, and the designation of SR-106 changed to the signed route, US-89, in 1977.

== Route description ==
The highway initially begins at the intersection of 800 West and 2600 South in Woods Cross. From that intersection, SR-93 heads southeast on 2600 South, passing under I-15 at exit 315. The road intersects with a local road and veers northeasterly briefly before straightening out to the east and terminating at US-89. The entire highway is located in a commercial environment, with restaurants, supermarkets, car dealerships, and gas stations a portion of the businesses located on the road.

The interchange nearing the highway's western terminus provides the first exit in Davis County for northbound motorists on I-15 (southbound motorists are given an exit at Center Street southwest of 2600 South).

The entire route is included in the National Highway System.

== History ==
State Route 93 was established in 1961 to provide a state-maintained connection from the under-construction I-15 to the town of Woods Cross and southern Bountiful. At that time, 2600 South was named 6500 South. However, in between 1961 and 1965, the road was renamed to its present designation. The route initially went east to SR-106. In 1969, a half-mile portion was transferred from SR-131 to SR-93, extending SR-93 south. In 1977, SR-106 was rerouted and US-89 replaced SR-106. In 1985, the western terminus was moved back to I-15.

In 2015, the interchange at I-15 was realigned slightly, which resulted in the route's overall distance decreasing by 0.01 miles.

== Major intersections ==
The entire route is in Davis County.

| Location | mi | km | Destinations | Notes |
|---|---|---|---|---|
| North Salt Lake | 0.000 | 0.000 | 800 West | Western terminus |
| Woods Cross–North Salt Lake line | 0.008– 0.104 | 0.013– 0.167 | I-15 – Salt Lake City, Ogden | |
| Woods Cross–North Salt Lake– Bountiful tripoint | 0.355 | 0.571 | US 89 (Main Street) | Eastern terminus |
1.000 mi = 1.609 km; 1.000 km = 0.621 mi
