= Utah State Route 75 =

State highway in Springville, Utah, U.S.

State Route 75

Route information
- Maintained by UDOT
- Length: 2.023 mi (3.256 km)
- Existed: 1962–present

Major junctions
- West end: I-15 in Springville
- East end: US 89 in Springville

Location
- Country: United States
- State: Utah

Highway system
- Utah State Highway System; Interstate; US; State; Minor; Scenic
← SR-74	→ SR-76

State Route 75 (SR-75) is a state highway in the U.S. state of Utah. It is 2 miles (3.2 km) long, and connects I-15 and US-89 in north Springville.

== Route description ==
The route's western end is at exit 265 of I-15, in the northwest part of Springville. From there, it travels just over 2 miles to the east, to its intersection with US-89 (Main Street) in the northeast part of Springville at the base of the Wasatch Mountains.

SR-75 is part of the National Highway System.

== History ==
This route was approved as a state highway in 1962, and has remained unchanged since then, save for rewording the description to reflect the renumbering of Route 1 to Route 15, and Route 8 to Route 89 in the 1977 Utah state route renumbering.

== Major intersections ==
The entire route is in Springville, Utah County.

mi	km	Destinations	Notes
0.000– 0.240	0.000– 0.386	I-15	Western terminus, also Exit 261 on I-15
2.023	3.256	US 89 (Main Street)	Eastern terminus
1.000 mi = 1.609 km; 1.000 km = 0.621 mi
