= Utah State Route 269 =

State highway in Utah, United States

State Route 269
- 500 South & 600 South
- SR 269 highlighted in red

Route information
- Maintained by UDOT
- Length: 0.904 mi (1,455 m)
- Existed: 1960–present

Major junctions
- West end: I-15 / I-80 in Salt Lake City
- East end: US 89 in Salt Lake City

Location
- Country: United States
- State: Utah
- Counties: Salt Lake

Highway system
- Utah State Highway System; Interstate; US; State; Minor; Scenic
← SR-268	→ SR-270

State Route 269 (SR-269) is a state highway in the U.S. state of Utah that sits completely within Salt Lake City in Salt Lake County. It consists entirely of a one-way pair of 500 South and 600 South, two parallel one-way streets that connect I-15 and I-80 to downtown Salt Lake City. SR-269 was designated in 1960 and constructed later that decade, coinciding with the construction of I-15 in the area.

Prior to 2000, SR-269 began and ended with viaducts that were longer than they are now. From the western terminus, the viaduct extended from I-15/I-80 to 200 West, two blocks east of where the viaduct ends presently. The other segment's viaduct began at 300 West (also two blocks east of where it begins now) and extended to I-15/I-80. As a part of I-15's reconstruction and then-Salt Lake City Mayor Deedee Corradini's project that included The Gateway, the viaducts were drastically shortened. This was possible primarily because the Union Pacific Railroad was making much less use of the rail lines over which the eastern portions of the viaduct passed than it and its former competitor, the Denver and Rio Grande Western Railroad were when the highway was originally constructed.

The route connects the city center with the freeway. As the settlers of Utah laid their towns with amply wide streets, one-way streets are rare in the city, SR-269 being one of two such pairs in existence. As part of I-15's construction in the 1960s, planners felt that two one-way streets with many lanes leading to and from the freeway would be better utilized. The one-way streets continue (as non-state highways) east of US-89 to the block west of Trolley Square before becoming two-way and then intersecting SR-71.

== Route description ==
SR-269 has two separate segments that lie a block apart, both one-way streets; the eastbound segment is known as 600 South (ceremoniously Martin Luther King Jr. Boulevard), while the westbound segment is named 500 South (officially Cesar E. Chavez Boulevard).

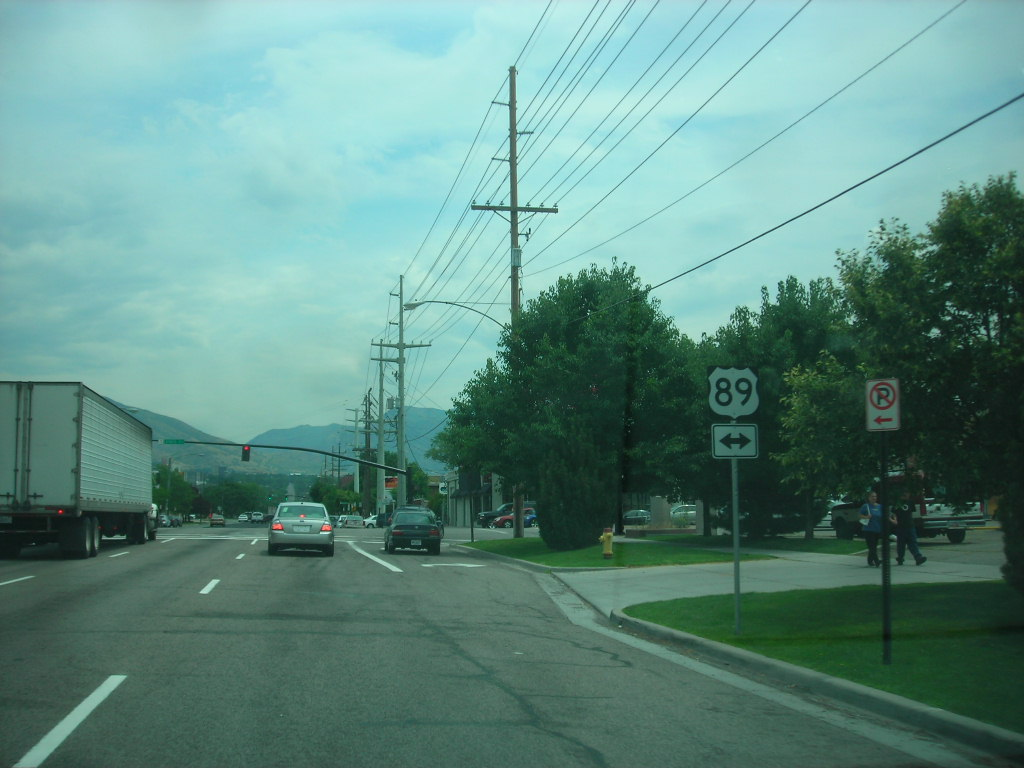
Eastbound section approaching US-89

The highway begins its eastbound stint from two exits from eastbound I-80 and northbound I-15. The ramps merge above the small rail yard that runs along the west side of 600 West, and the combined viaduct carries five eastbound lanes on a route aligned with 600 South (which exists as a frontage road below). The viaduct reaches grade-level at 400 West in the Granary District area of the city. Past 200 West, the road loses one lane. The highway continues east three blocks (intersecting SR-270 and Main Street, including a light rail route used by all three lines of the TRAX light rail system) before state maintenance ends at US-89 (State Street).

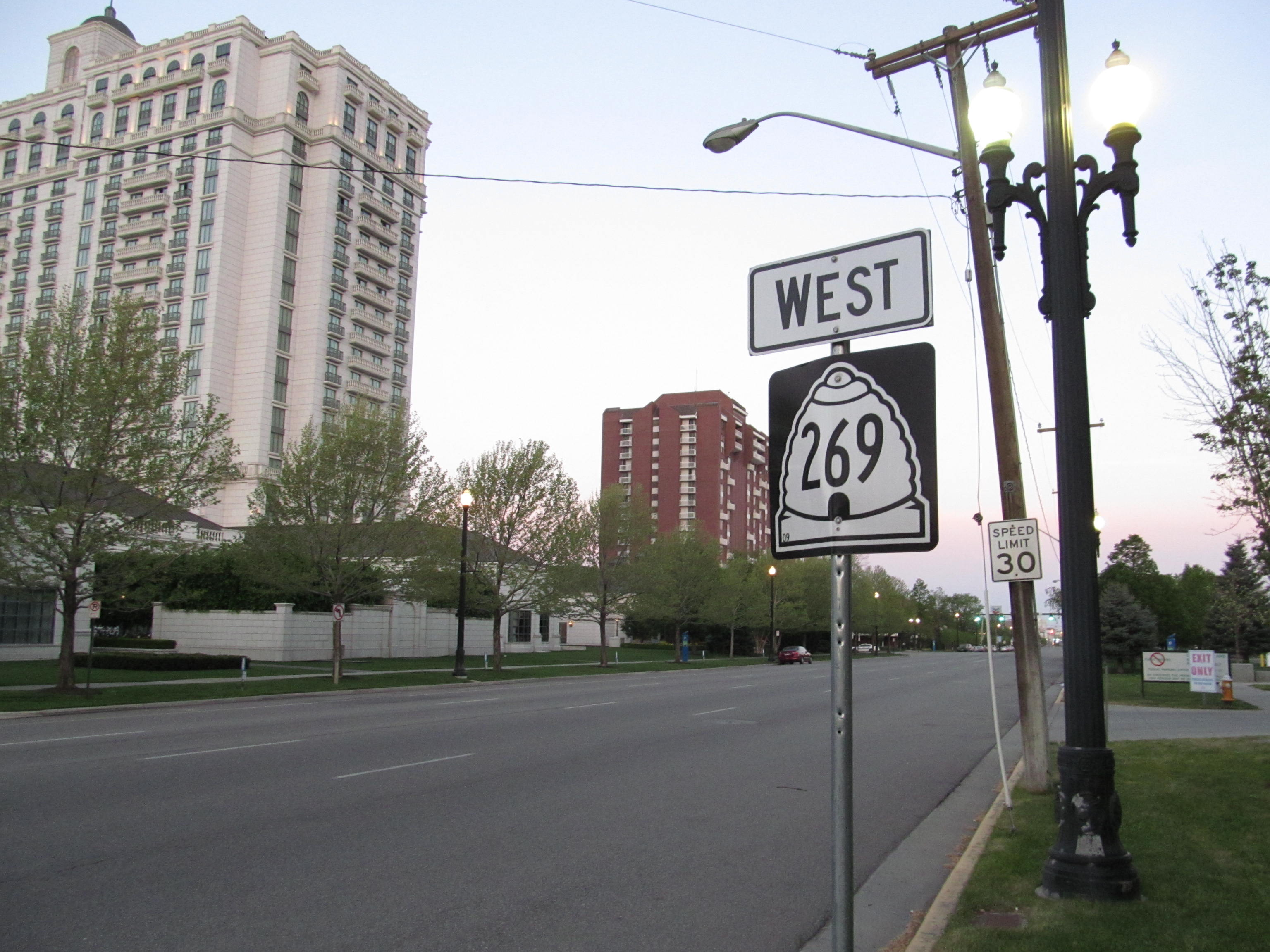
SR-269 westbound from SR-270

The westbound section begins at an intersection with US-89 (at the southwest corner of Washington Square) with four lanes and passes south of the Scott Matheson State Courthouse and the Courthouse TRAX station on 500 South. Continuing past Main Street, the road gains one lane at SR-270 and another at 200 West. At 400 West, it passes a grain elevator that is served by a railroad spur running in the block between SR-269's two at-grade segments (connecting to the rail yard over which the elevated segments pass). After 500 West, the highway elevates to above grade-level with four lanes and dips southwest before two lanes default onto southbound I-15/eastbound I-80 and the two other lanes default onto westbound I-80.

The entirety of SR-269, as well as the city-maintained portions of 500 and 600 South between State Street and 700 East/SR-71, is included in the National Highway System.

== History ==
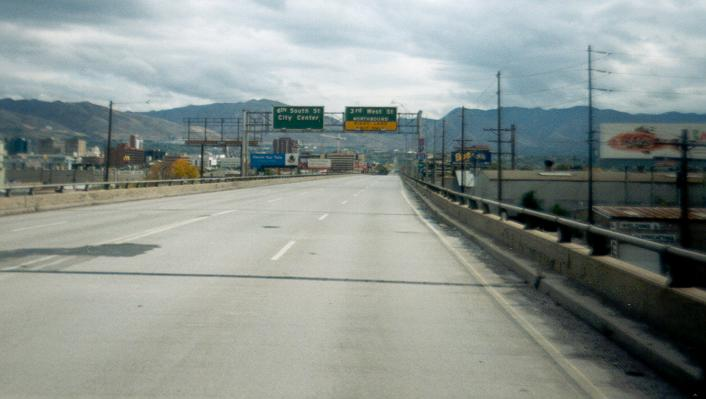
Looking east on 600 South, before the viaduct was replaced

As I-15 was being constructed through the Wasatch Front, the State Road Commission designated three routes—SR-268, SR-269, and SR-270—in 1960 as direct connections into Salt Lake City's downtown.

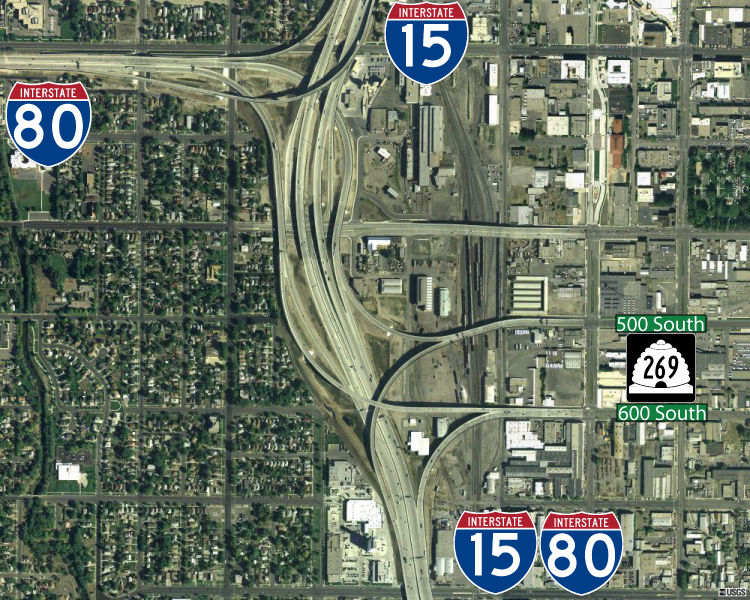
An overhead view of the route's western terminus at I-15/I-80

All three had viaducts connecting the freeway to a road closer to the city center. In SR-269's case, the viaducts were necessary to pass over active railroad mainlines: the Denver and Rio Grande Western Railroad operated a line along 500 West as well as the line along 600 West now used by Union Pacific and UTA's FrontRunner and Union Pacific operated its old main line along 400 West. Rio Grande's duplicate parallel lines perhaps could have been combined at that time, though the 500 West track would have needed to stay in place for the Rio Grande Zephyr or similar infrequent passenger trains to continue to access the Rio Grande station; Union Pacific, however, had no alternative route for its 400 West mainline.

The initial extent of SR-269 was only the elevated viaducts, stretching from I-15 east to 300 West (SR-176), which then carried US-40, US-89, and US-91 through downtown. Since the final design included a bridge over SR-176 on 600 South, the eastbound direction was extended one block to 200 West in 1963. The state legislature extended both directions further to SR-271 (State Street, now US-89) in 1969.

As Salt Lake City won the bid for the 2002 Winter Olympics in 1995, I-15 was reconstructed. As part of the reconstruction, SR-268 and SR-269's viaducts into the city were set to be reconstructed and shortened. Mayor Corradini wanted to revitalize an industrial portion of Salt Lake City with her Gateway project. A part of her project included demolishing the almost mile-long viaducts of SR-269, as she felt a freeway bridge passing over the area she was trying to revitalize would be a hindrance to the project. The pair of viaducts were demolished in late-1998–early-1999, replaced with much shorter viaducts in 2000.

This replacement was made possible by the agreement of trackage rights during the 1980s allowing Union Pacific to use Rio Grande's line between Salt Lake City and Provo, and the subsequent acquisition of Rio Grande by Southern Pacific and then by Union Pacific itself. Mitigation for the removal of the lines was nevertheless necessary; most notably, the Salt Lake City Intermodal Hub was built at 600 West to replace the functions of the Rio Grande and Union Pacific stations, both of which are now isolated from the former mainlines that connected to them from the south by traffic streaming to and from I-15 on SR-269 (as part of The Gateway development, the lines from the north were cut too).

== Major intersections ==
Note: Mileposts are measured from west to east on the eastbound roadway, then continue east to west along the westbound roadway. Both figures are given in the table, eastbound above westbound. The entire route is in Salt Lake City, Salt Lake County.

mi	km	Destinations	Notes
0.000 1.807	0.000 2.908	I-15 south / I-80 – Las Vegas, Cheyenne, Reno, Salt Lake City International Airport	Westbound exit and eastbound entrance
0.311 1.494	0.501 2.404	To I-15 north / 300 West	Former SR-176
0.612 1.192	0.985 1.918	SR-270 (West Temple)	
0.904 0.905	1.455 1.456	US 89 (State Street)	
1.000 mi = 1.609 km; 1.000 km = 0.621 mi
