= Utah State Route 133 =

State highway in Utah, United States

State Route 133
- SR 133 highlighted in red

Route information
- Maintained by UDOT
- Length: 7.183 mi (11.560 km)
- Existed: 1969–present

Major junctions
- South end: South town limits in Kanosh
- North end: I-15 in Meadow

Location
- Country: United States
- State: Utah

Highway system
- Utah State Highway System; Interstate; US; State; Minor; Scenic
| ← SR-132 | → SR-134 |

State Route 133 (SR-133) is a highway completely within Millard County in central Utah that connects Interstate 15 (I-15) to Kanosh while passing through Meadow. The route serves as both communities' Main Street in its seven-mile (11 km) span.

== Route description ==
From the southern terminus at the southern city limits of Kanosh, the route runs north as a two-lane undivided highway through the town before turning northeast. It continues this direction until reaching Meadow, where it turns north again. It maintains this direction until its northern terminus with I-15.

== History ==
When this designation was formed in 1933, the route ran from SR-2, now Interstate 80, in Coalville to the Wyoming border via Pine View. This route was deleted in 1969.

The current route of SR-133 was formed in the same year the old route was deleted, 1969. When it was first formed, it made a partial loop around SR-1 (I-15). In 1975 the portion of the highway from the southern terminus of I-15 to the southern Kanosh city limits was deleted, forming the current route.

== Major intersections ==
The entire route is in Millard County.

| Location | mi | km | Destinations | Notes |
|---|---|---|---|---|
| Kanosh | 0.000 | 0.000 | Kanosh south city limits | Southern terminus |
| | 3.263 | 5.251 | Hatton Road | Former UT-141 |
| Meadow | 7.094– 7.183 | 11.417– 11.560 | I-15 – Beaver, Fillmore | Northern terminus, also Exit 158 on I-15 |
1.000 mi = 1.609 km; 1.000 km = 0.621 mi

== See also ==
- List of state highways in Utah
