= Utah State Route 268 =

State highway in Utah, United States

State Route 268
- 600 North

Route information
- Maintained by UDOT
- Length: 0.734 mi (1,181 m)
- Existed: 1960–present

Major junctions
- West end: I-15 in Salt Lake City
- East end: US 89 in Salt Lake City

Location
- Country: United States
- State: Utah

Highway system
- Utah State Highway System; Interstate; US; State; Minor; Scenic
| ← SR-266 | → SR-269 |

State Route 268 is a state highway in the U.S. state of Utah that connects I-15 to US-89 in a span of 0.734 miles (1.18 km). The highway is completely within Salt Lake City and is routed along 600 North.

== Route description ==
The highway begins just west of the interchange with I-15 at 800 West. Immediately following that intersection, a short viaduct begins. After the structure tops out, the single-point urban interchange begins at exit 309 on I-15. Past the SPUI, the viaduct crosses over 600 West, 500 West, and the Union Pacific/Utah Transit Authority train tracks. The viaduct structure reaches grade-level at 400 West and continues east for another block before terminating at US-89 (Beck Street).

The portion of the route between I-15 and 400 West is part of the National Highway System.

== History ==
The State Road Commission designated SR-268 in 1960, connecting proposed I-15 to SR-1 (US-89/US-91) along 600 North.

== Major intersections ==
The entire route is in Salt Lake City, Salt Lake County.

| mi | km | Destinations | Notes |
|---|---|---|---|
| 0.000 | 0.000 | 800 West | Western terminus |
| 0.102– 0.241 | 0.164– 0.388 | I-15 – Provo, Ogden | |
| 0.734 | 1.181 | US 89 (John Stockton Drive) / 300 West | Eastern terminus |
1.000 mi = 1.609 km; 1.000 km = 0.621 mi
