= Utah State Route 212 (1941–2012) =

State highway in Utah, United States

State Route 212

Route information
- Maintained by UDOT
- Length: 1.289 mi (2.074 km)
- Existed: 1941–2012

Major junctions
- West end: I-15 in Washington
- East end: 300 East Street in Washington

Location
- Country: United States
- State: Utah

Highway system
- Utah State Highway System; Interstate; US; State; Minor; Scenic

State Route 212 (SR-212) was a state highway in the U.S. state of Utah. Spanning just 1.28 miles (2.06 km), it served as a minor arterial road connecting Interstate 15 (I-15) with the city of Washington.

== Route description ==
SR-212 began at the northwest frontage road of I-15 of the Washington interchange. From there, it crossed southeasterly under the Interstate via a single-point urban interchange. Just 0.1 miles (0.16 km) later, the route turned left onto Telegraph Street, traveling northeast through a built-up area of restaurants and retail stores. A short distance later, the route curved to the east along State Street through the center of Washington, passing public pocket parks, a post office, and the city museum before ending at its intersection with 300 East.

== History ==
When SR-212 was created in 1941, it followed a different route through the area. Originally, SR-1 ran east–west through the city of Washington along State Street and Telegraph Street, where SR-212 is now. The original alignment of SR-212 ran south from State Street along 200 South and across the Virgin River along what is now Washington Fields Road before turning west to then SR-64 (now River Road), a total distance of about 7.1 miles (11.4 km).

In 1964, with the completion of I-15 just north of State Street through Washington, the Utah State Road Commission realigned SR-1 to follow the Interstate while SR-212 was extended from its northern terminus westward along former SR-1 to the new Washington interchange. This eastward extension became the entirety of SR-212 after the old alignment of the route south from Washington was withdrawn by the state in 1969. The route remained unchanged until 1992, when its eastern end was extended one block east. It was later removed from the state highway system in 2012.

== Major intersections ==
The entire route was in Washington, Washington County.

mi	km	Destinations	Notes
0.000	0.000	Middleton Drive	Western terminus
0.046	0.074	I-15 south – Las Vegas	
0.094	0.151	I-15 north – Cedar City	
1.203	1.936	200 East	Former northern terminus of SR-212 via 200 East
1.289	2.074	300 East	Eastern terminus
1.000 mi = 1.609 km; 1.000 km = 0.621 mi
