= Interstate 15 in Utah =

Section of Interstate highway in Utah, United States

Interstate 15
- Veterans Memorial Highway
- I-15 highlighted in red

Route information
- Maintained by UDOT
- Length: 400.592 mi (644.690 km)
- Existed: 1956–present
- NHS: Entire route

Major junctions
- South end: I-15 at the Arizona state line near St. George
- I-70 near Cove Fort; US 50 from Holden to Scipio; US 6 from Santaquin to Spanish Fork; US 189 in Provo; US 89 at various locations; I-80 from South Salt Lake to Salt Lake City; I-84 from Riverdale to Tremonton; US 91 in Brigham City
- North end: I-15 at the Idaho state line near Portage

Location
- Country: United States
- State: Utah
- Counties: Washington, Iron, Beaver, Millard, Juab, Utah, Salt Lake, Davis, Weber, Box Elder

Highway system
- Interstate Highway System; Main; Auxiliary; Suffixed; Business; Future; Utah State Highway System; Interstate; US; State; Minor; Scenic
| ← SR-14 | → SR-16 |

Interstate 15 (I-15) runs north–south in the U.S. state of Utah through the southwestern and central portions of the state, passing through most of the state's population centers, including St. George and those comprising the Wasatch Front: Provo–Orem, Salt Lake City, and Ogden–Clearfield. It is Utah's primary and only north–south interstate highway, as the vast majority of the state's population lives along its corridor; the Logan metropolitan area is the state's only Metropolitan Statistical Area through which I-15 does not pass. In 1998, the Utah State Legislature designated Utah's entire portion of the road as the Veterans Memorial Highway.

== Route description ==
The Interstate passes through the fast-growing Dixie region, which includes St. George and Cedar City, and eventually most of the major cities and suburbs along the Wasatch Front, including Provo, Orem, Sandy, West Jordan, Salt Lake City, Layton, and Ogden. Around Cove Fort, I-70 begins its journey eastward across the country. The Interstate merges with I-80 for about 3 miles (4.8 km) from South Salt Lake to just west of Downtown Salt Lake City and merges with I-84 from Ogden to Tremonton. Along nearly its entire length through the state, I-15 winds its way along the western edge of a nearly continuous range of mountains (including the Wasatch Range in the northern half of the state). The only exceptions are when it passes through the mountains south of Cedar City and, again, north of Cove Fort.

=== Southern Utah ===
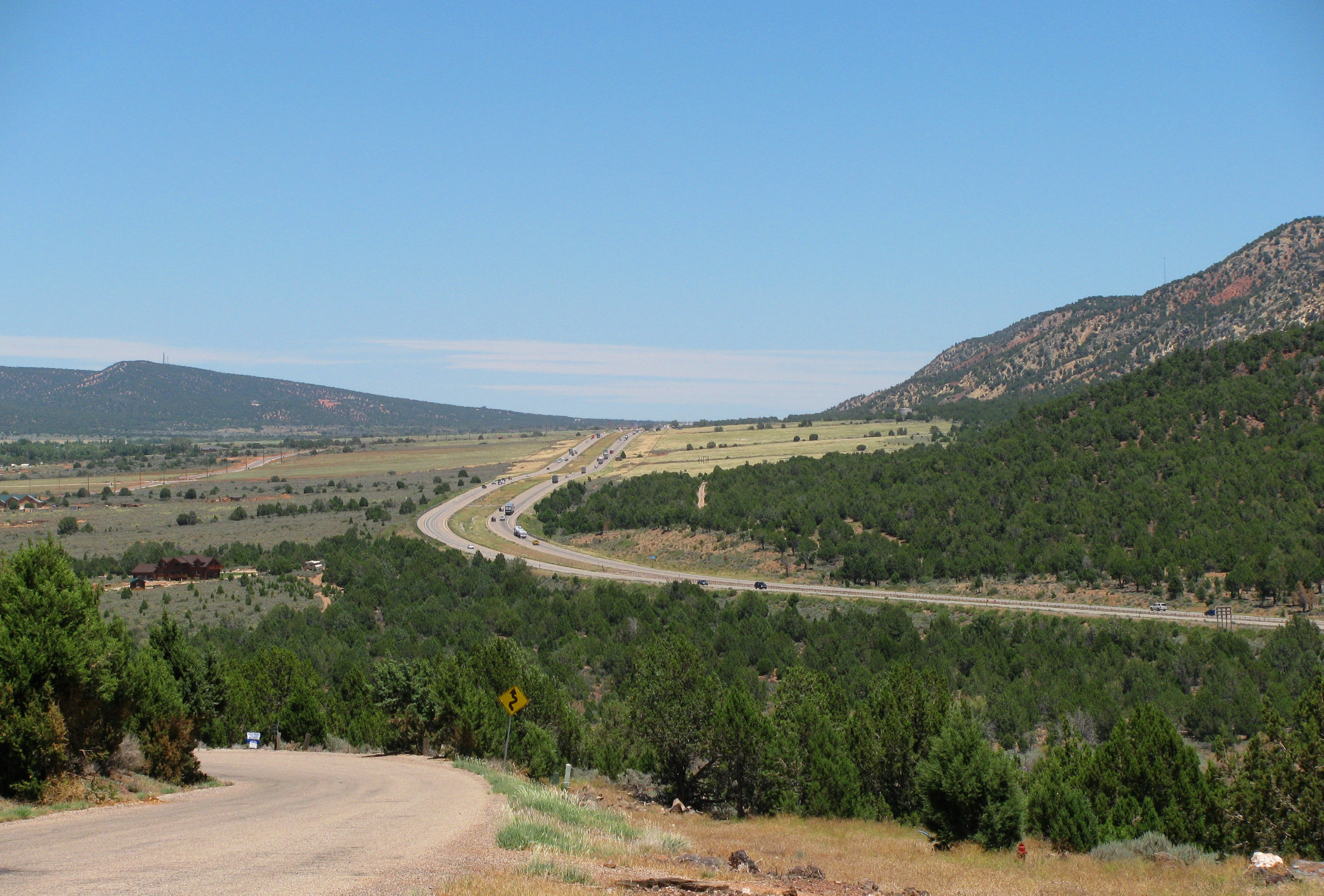
I-15 near New Harmony, south of Cedar City, looking north

From Las Vegas, Nevada, I-15 winds and slightly inclines through the Virgin River Gorge in northwest Arizona, then it crosses the border into Utah and Washington County. Just past the border, there is a port of entry on each side of the freeway. These ports of entry (weigh stations) are jointly operated by the states of Utah and Arizona and are the first northbound exit and last southbound exit on I-15 in Utah. Heading north-northeast, it continues with two lanes in each direction until it reaches an interchange with Southern Parkway (SR-7), which provides access to the St. George Regional Airport. After SR-7, the route turns north as it passes the Bloomington area of the City of St. George and an interchange at Brigham Road, where an auxiliary lane is added before it crosses the Virgin River. This marks the lowest elevation along I-15 in Utah, 2,560 feet (780 m) above sea level. Immediately north of the Virgin River and partially spanning the Santa Clara River, is the Dixie Drive interchange. A collector ramp is added between Dixie Drive and the next interchange with Bluff Street (SR-18). I-15 then narrows to two lanes in each direction and turns northeast again, where it passes the eastern side of downtown St. George, with an interchange at St. George Boulevard (SR-34). The Bluff Street and St. George Boulevard interchanges are the southern and northern ends of the St. George I-15 Business Loop. From this point north, I-15 generally follows the route of the Old US 91, maintaining a two-lane configuration until it reaches the Wasatch Front in the north-central part of the state. (The route of Old US 91, in turn, followed the older Arrowhead Trail highway to Salt Lake City.)

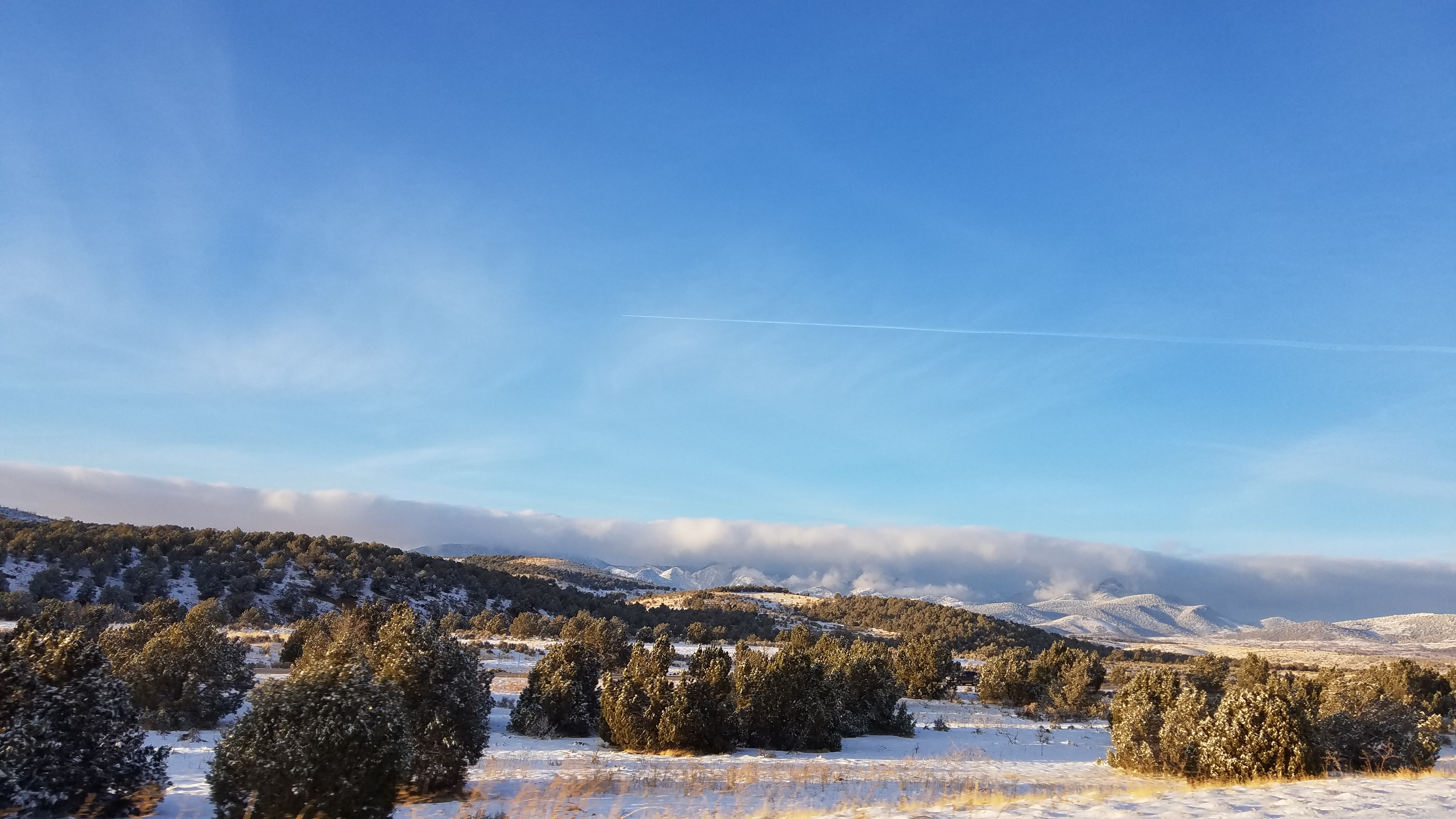
View to the west from I-15 near Cedar City, Utah

After leaving St. George, I-15 continues northeast and passes through the northern part of the city of Washington. An auxiliary lane is added between St. George Boulevard and Green Springs Road with additional interchanges at Washington Parkway and State Street (SR-9). Northeast of Washington, I-15 passes through the northwestern side of the town of Leeds, with one-way interchanges on the southwest and northeast ends of town. After passing through the northwestern part of Toquerville, and an interchange with SR-17 (at Anderson Junction), I-15 resumes a more north-northeastern course as it ascends about 1,000 feet (300 m) higher on the Colorado Plateau. Along the way, it passes through the areas of Browse and Pintura, with interchanges at both, as well as two more ranch exits further northeast. After its ascent, it passes by the east of side of Ash Creek Reservoir and then by the northwest corner of Zion National Park, with an interchange providing access to the Kolob Canyon area of the park. Next is an interchange that provides access to New Harmony (several miles west) and Kanarraville (several miles to the northeast). This interchange is also at the border of Washington County and Iron County.

Just after entering Iron County, I-15 reaches the southernmost rest areas along its route within the state (with one each, northbound and southbound). After passing about a mile (1.6 km) west of Kanarraville, it reaches an interchange in Hamilton Fort. The freeway then briefly turns nearly east before turning north again to pass through the west side of Cedar City. The first interchange is at the southern end of SR-130 (Main Street) and the Cedar City I-15 Business Loop. Just north is the 200 South (SR-56) interchange, which provides access to downtown Cedar City as well as the Cedar City Regional Airport. After this interchange, the freeway turns northeast before the final Cedar City interchange with SR-130 (once again). This interchange is also the northern end of the Cedar City I-15 Business Loop, although no longer indicated as such by signage. The freeway then passes by the eastern edge of Enoch, but without an interchange within that city. After an interchange within the area of Summit, I-15 heads east-northeast before passing by the northwest edge of Parowan, with interchanges on the west (200 South / SR-143) and north (Main Street / SR-274) sides of town. After Parowan, the freeway curves back to a northeast course as it passes about a mile (1.6 km) west of Paragonah and reaches an interchange on the north side of that city (SR-271). Continuing northeast, it reaches the next pair of rest areas before an interchange with SR-20 and then a ranch exit (exit 100) before leaving Iron County.

=== Central Utah ===
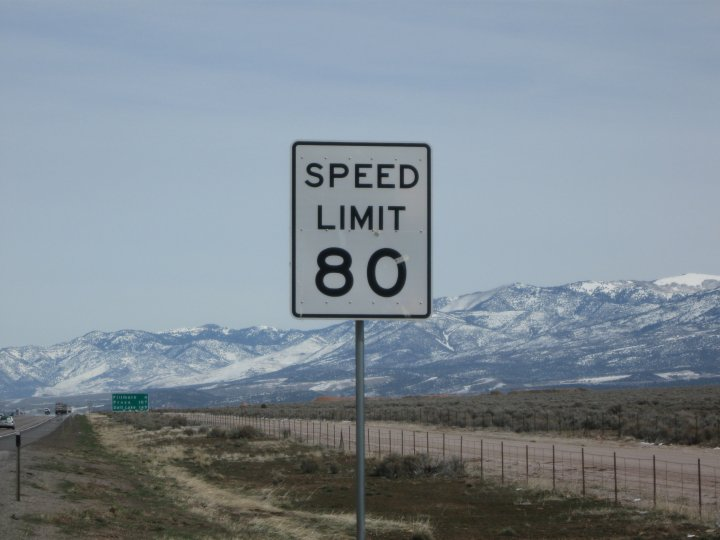
An 80 mph (130 km/h) speed limit sign in one of the test zones

As I-15 enters Beaver County, the Interstate turns northwestward and winds its way through the mountain pass before heading north again to pass along the western edge of the city of Beaver. The southern and northern interchanges in Beaver include the I-15 Business Loop and SR-160—the city streets are South Main Street on the south and 1400 North on the north. Off the 1400 North interchange, there is an official rest stop, courtesy of Utah Department of Transportation (UDOT) and the local Texaco Station. The freeway then heads slightly westward until it passes by the western side of the community of Manderfield and curves back to a north-northeast course. After several miles, there is an interchange with Manderfield Road before I-15 winds through another mountain pass and reaches the Sulphurdale interchange. This mountain pass, with a summit located at milepost 124.8, is the highest point along I-15 in Utah, at 6,611 feet (2,015 m) above sea level. After passing west of the ghost town of Sulphurdale, it reaches the interchange with the western end of I-70. This interchange is on the border of Beaver and Millard counties.

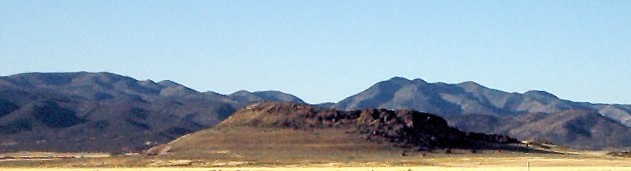
Extinct volcano cone near Fillmore, Utah, off I-15

North of the I-15/I-70 interchange, I-70 heads east to Richfield and then toward Denver, Colorado, while I-15 continues north to pass by Cove Fort on the east and reach the Cove Fort (SR-161/Black Rock Road) interchange. Off the Black Rock Road interchange is an official rest stop, courtesy of UDOT and the local Chevron Station. I-15 meanders to the north-northeast before straightening out to the northeast–southwest of Kanosh. The freeway passes by the northwestern side of Meadow, having an interchange with North Main Street (SR-133). It then passes through the western side of Fillmore. SR-99 follows the length of the I-15 Business Loop through Fillmore, connecting at 850 South on the southwestern part of town and North Main Street / Cedar Mountain Road on the northern city limits. Off the North Main Street interchange, there is an official rest stop courtesy of UDOT and the local Chevron Station. Continuing north-northwest, it has an interchange with 5400 North / Maple Hollow Road (SR-64) before passing by the southeast edge of Holden. Several miles northeast of Holden, US 50 merges with I-15 as it continues northeastward and eventually heading through a low mountain pass just after another ranch exit. The US 50 overlap then ends as I-15 passes through the northwestern corner of Scipio. Off the Scipio interchange, is an official rest stop courtesy of UDOT and Flying J. (US 50 eastbound serves as a connector to I-70 for southbound I-15 motorists.)

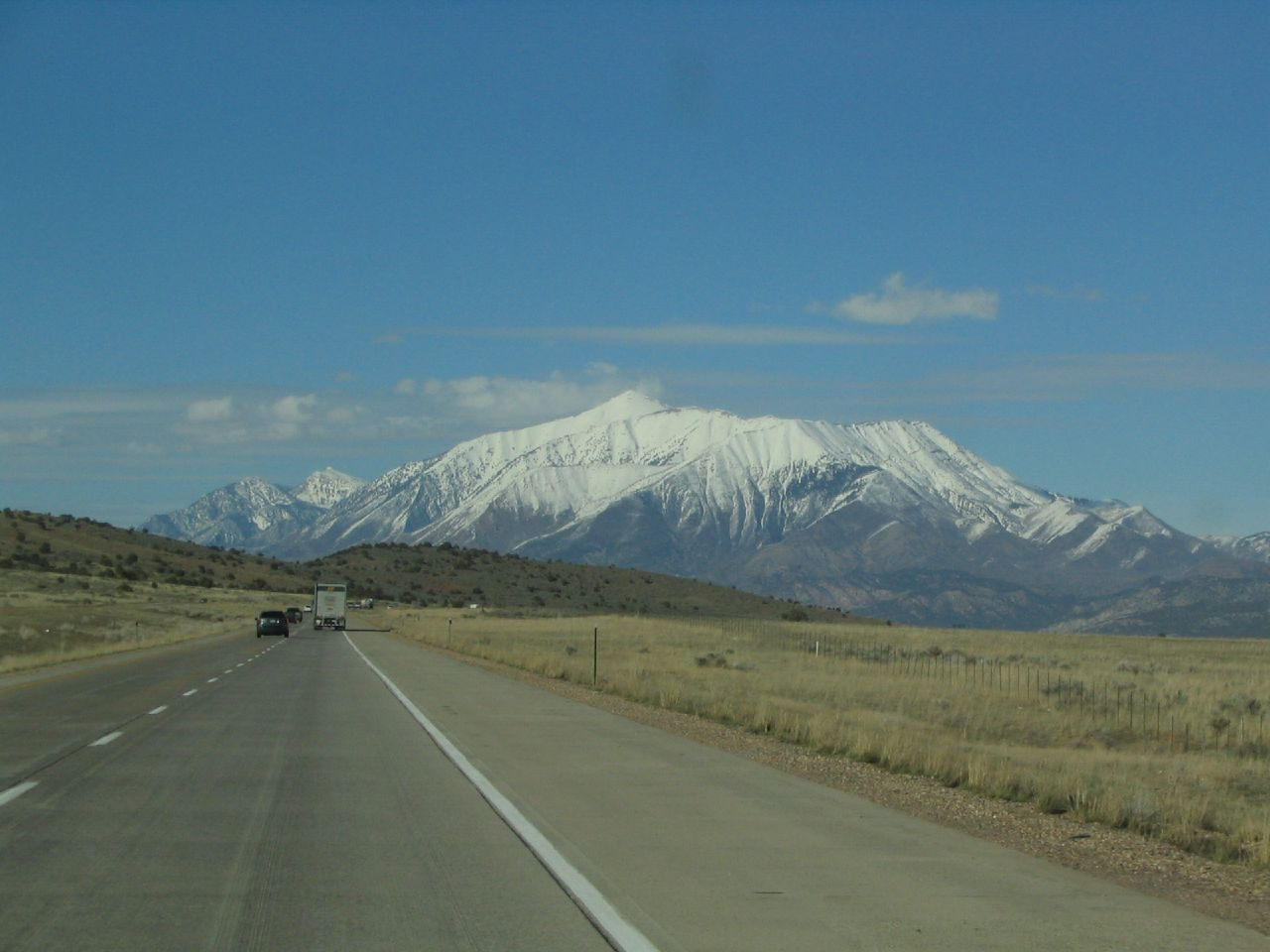
View of Mount Nebo from I-15 slightly south of Nephi

Several miles north of Scipio, I-15 leaves Millard County and enters Juab County before turning northeastward again. After an interchange with the Yuba Lake Road is another interchange at Mills Junction / SR-78 just southeast of Chicken Creek Reservoir. The freeway then continues roughly north-northeast until it turns northeast to pass through the southern part of Nephi and an interchange with South Main Street (SR-28). The freeway then turns north to pass through the eastern side of Nephi, with an interchange with 100 North (SR-132). It then curves to the north-northwest before reaching the interchange with the northern end of SR-28 about a mile (1.6 km) north of town. The Interstate then turns north and passes by the eastern side of Mona and has an interchange with SR-52 (300 North). Continuing north, it passes by the eastern edge of Rocky Ridge before promptly leaving Juab County and entering Utah County.

=== Northern Utah ===
==== Salt Lake area ====
As the freeway enters Utah County, it also enters Utah Valley, the Wasatch Front, and the Provo–Orem metropolitan area. Turning northeast, it enters the town of Santaquin, where US 6 begins its overlap with I-15 at the interchange with East Main Street / US 6 / SR-198. Exiting Santaquin, the Interstate turns north to pass by the western edge of Spring Lake before entering Payson, turning northeast, and reaching the 800 South (SR-178) interchange. Continuing northeast, the freeway reaches the interchange with North Main Street (SR-115 / 3200 West) in north Payson. Maintaining its course to the northeast, it passes the eastern edge of Benjamin and western edge of Salem, with an interchange with SR-164 (8000 South), and enters Spanish Fork and gains one lane in each direction. On the north side of Spanish Fork is an interchange with North Main Street (US 6 and SR-156), after which I-15 turns north and gains one more lane in each direction. This interchange also marks the northern end of the overlap with US 6. (The section between Spanish Fork and Lehi was rebuilt in 2010–2012 as part of the I-15 CORE project.)

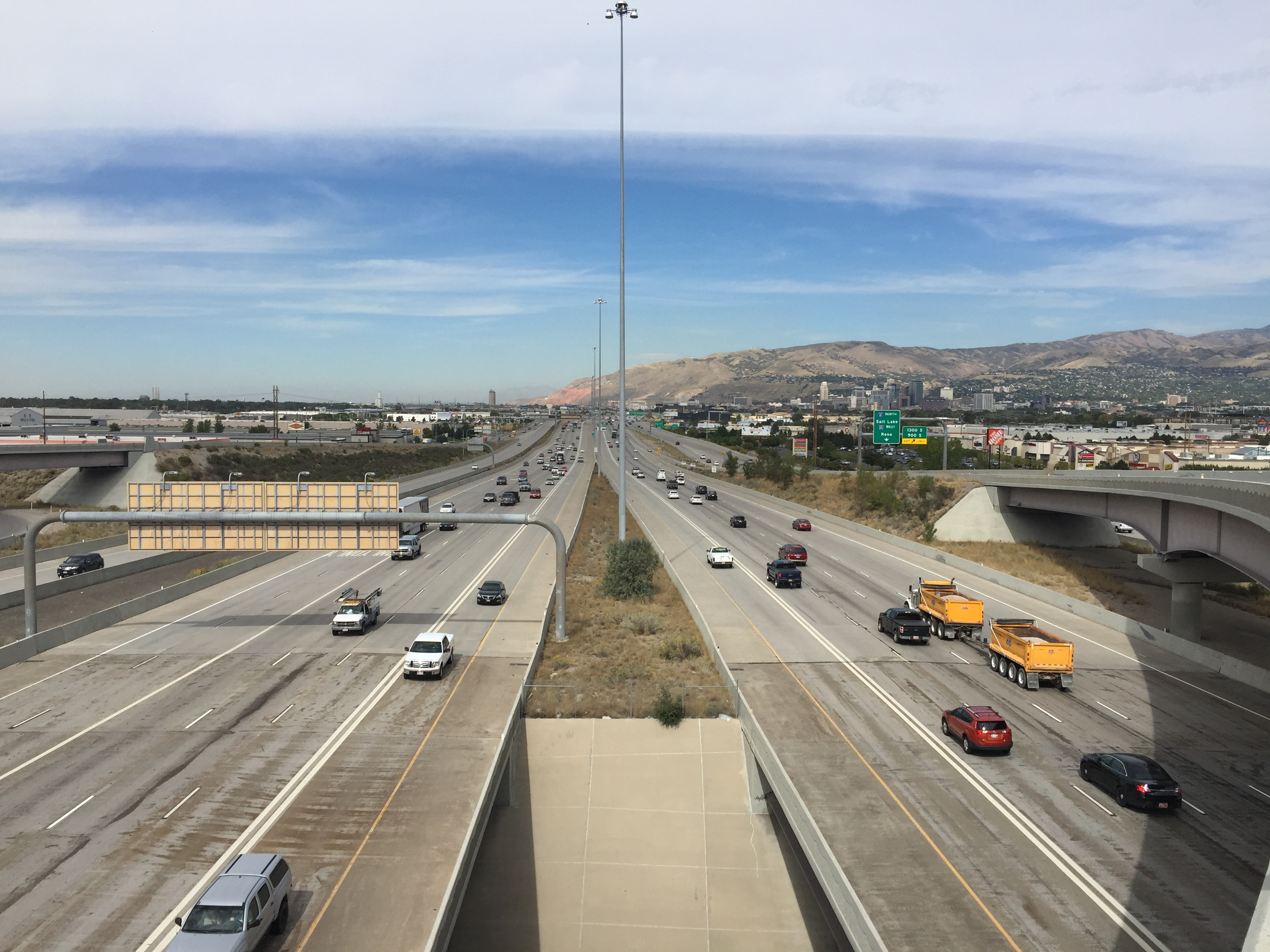
View north along I-15 at the southern junction with I-80 and SR-201 in Salt Lake County

Continuing north with four lanes, it gains an additional express lane in both directions. It then passes through the far west side of Springville, with interchanges at 400 South (SR-77) and 1400 North (SR-75). Off the 1400 North interchange is an official rest stop courtesy of UDOT and Flying J. Curving northwest, it passes the eastern edge of the Provo Bay of Utah Lake before reaching Provo. Upon entering Provo, it intersects with South University Avenue (the southern terminus of US 189) and East Lakeview Parkway. The Interstate then continues northwest, bisecting the west side of Provo, with an interchange with Center Street (SR-114) before leaving Provo and entering Orem. After an interchange with West University Parkway (SR-265), immediately southwest of Utah Valley University, the freeway heads north along the western side of Orem. After interchanges with Center Street, and then 800 North (SR-52), the Interstate curves northwest and immediately reaches the interchange with SR-241 (1600 North / 600 South). This interchange on the border of Orem and Lindon.

Continuing northwest, I-15 passes through the western side of Lindon before passing by the southwest edge of Pleasant Grove, with an interchange at Pleasant Grove Boulevard. Next, the freeway enters American Fork with interchanges at 500 East (SR-180) on the south end of town and West Main Street / Pioneer Crossing (SR-145) on the west end of town. After American Fork, the freeway enters Lehi with its first interchange at East Main Street (SR-73). At this point, the Interstate narrows to three lanes (plus an express lane) in each direction. The next interchange in Lehi is with 2100 North / 1200 West (US 89 / SR-85). This also begins the first of two I-15 / US 89 overlaps. The final interchange in Lehi is with Timpanogos Highway / Clubhouse Drive (SR-92), after which the Interstate gains an additional two lanes, which is just east of Thanksgiving Point. Past Lehi, the Interstate exits the Provo metropolitan area and Utah County to enter the Salt Lake City metropolitan area as it passes through the Point of the Mountain.

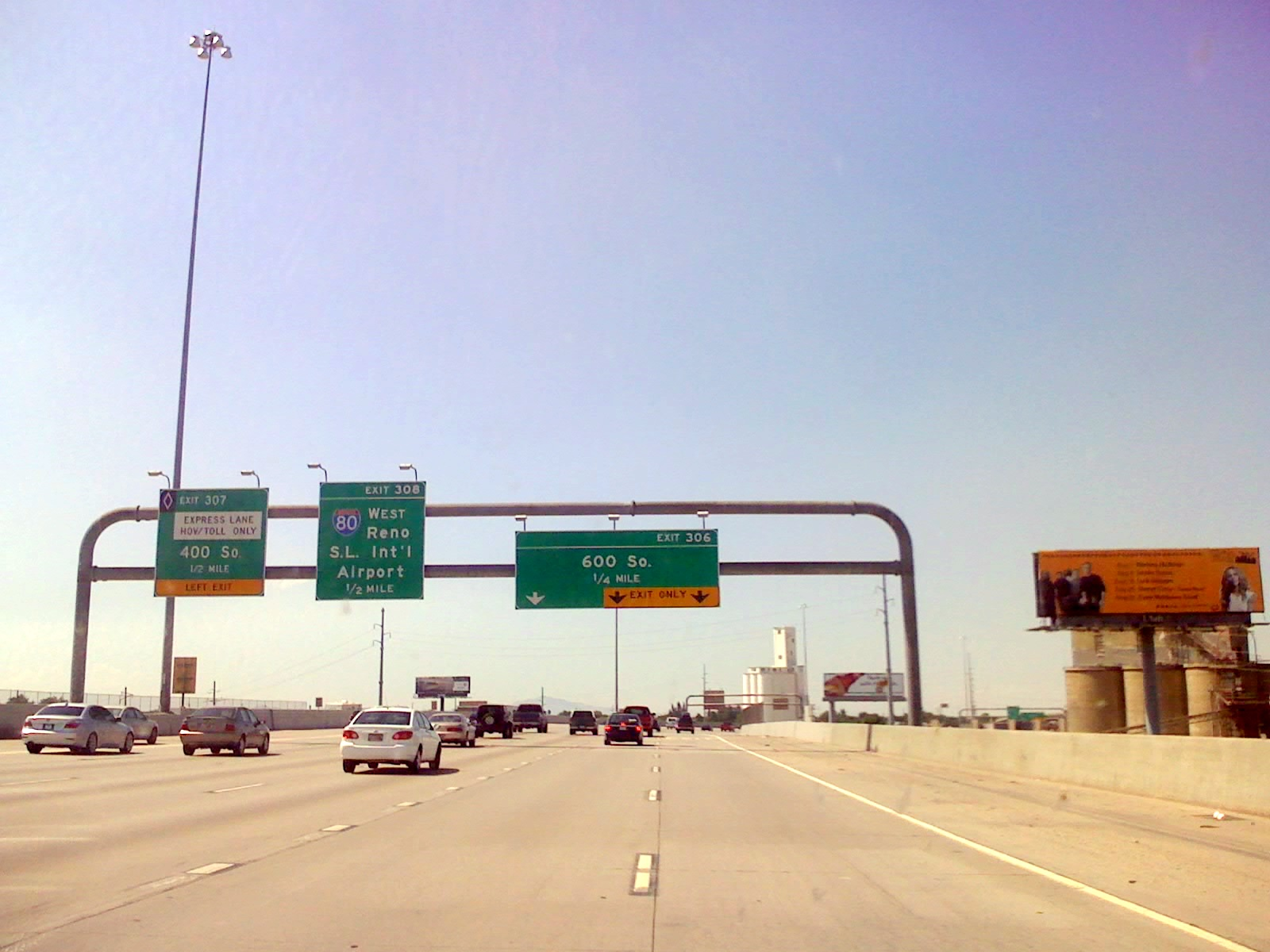
I-15 in Salt Lake City

As the route enters the Salt Lake Valley from only one of three other points connecting Salt Lake County and Utah County (the others being SR-68 and Traverse Ridge Road), it turns northeast to pass by the eastern edge of Bluffdale. It then enters Draper and heads north to pass through the western part of that city, with four interchanges along the way. The first is with Highland Drive / 14600 South (SR-140). The next interchange is with Bangerter Highway (SR-154). The third interchange in Draper is with 12300 South (US 89 / SR-71). This interchange is also where US 89 ends its first overlap with the Interstate and where I-15 curves slightly to the west. The final interchange in town is on the northern city limits at 11400 South (SR-175). This interchange is on the southern border of Sandy, and is the first of three within that city. The next interchange is with 10600 South (SR-151). The final interchange in Sandy is with 9000 South (SR-209).

Shortly after the last interchange in Sandy, it leaves that city and enters Midvale, with the only interchange in that city being with 7200 South (SR-48). After leaving Midvale, I-15 enters Murray and immediately reaches the junction with I-215, a beltway running through many of Salt Lake City's suburbs. Past this interchange, there are two more interchanges in Murray. The first is at 5400 South (SR-173) and the second is with 4500 South / Taylorsville Expressway (SR-266). After this interchange, the freeway leaves Murray and passes through the western end of Millcreek (an unincorporated suburb of Salt Lake City) before entering South Salt Lake. After an interchange with 3300 South (SR-171), the Interstate reaches the Spaghetti Bowl, which is an interchange with I-80 and SR-201 (21st South Freeway). The southern overlap of I-80 begins at this point as well as the collector roads. The collectors, but not the main I-15 travel lanes, have interchanges with 2100 South and 1300 South, as well as West Temple Street (SR-270) for northbound traffic only. (The West Temple Street offramps are signed as 900 South.) The Spaghetti Bowl is also where the freeway leaves South Salt Lake enters Salt Lake City.

After entering Salt Lake City, the Interstate jogs to the west for the next three interchanges. The first is with SR-269 and includes the offramps from northbound I-15/I-80 to eastbound 600 South and the onramps from westbound 500 South to southbound I-15/I-80. The next two interchanges are overlain and include I-80 (the northern end of the I-80 overlap) and 400 South (West University Boulevard). (The later interchange only permits HOV or toll use of the northbound offramp and the southbound onramp from and to the respective express lanes of I-15/I-80.) North of the ramps with I-80, I-15 loses one lane, leaving three lanes, plus the express lane, in both directions. The next interchange is with 600 North (SR-268), following which the freeway jogs to the west for the next two interchanges. After the 900 West interchange (which does not include a northbound offramp) is the Warm Springs Road (northbound) and 2300 North (southbound) interchange. The freeway then returns to is northern course, but before leaving Salt Lake City and Salt Lake County, it has northbound on- and offramps for the Beck Street (US 89) interchange.

==== Ogden area ====
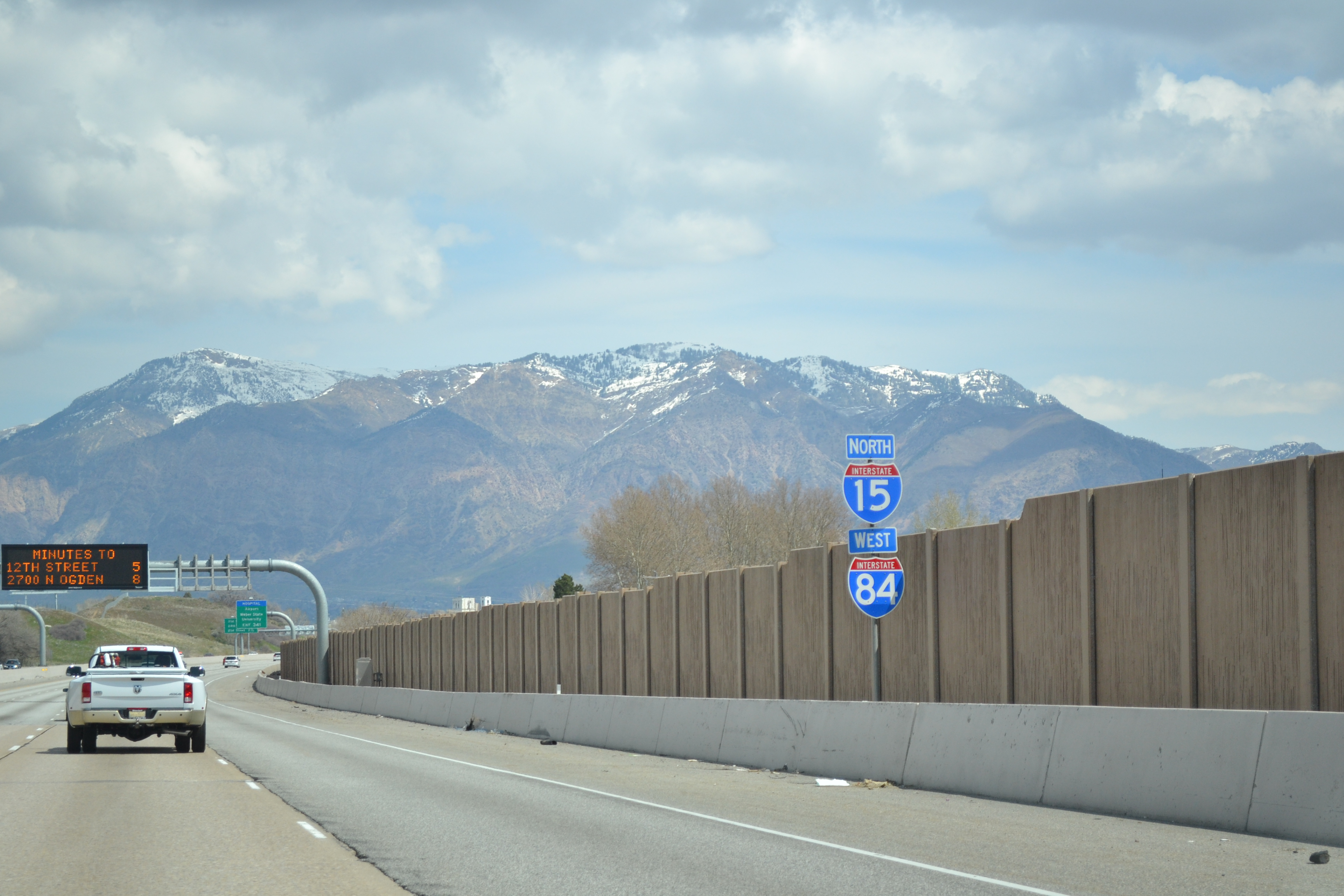
Northbound along I-15/I-84 in Ogden

After entering Davis County, the city of North Salt Lake, and the Ogden–Clearfield metropolitan area, I-15 has the southbound on- and offramps for the Beck Street (US 89) interchange. Next is the junction between I-15 and I-215 (Belt Route), which only provides a southbound offramp from I-15 to I-215 and a northbound onramp from I-215 to I-15. Just after this is another partial interchange that only includes a southbound offramp to West Center Street. The freeway then heads northwest to the 2600 South (SR-93) interchange, which is centered on the border of North Salt Lake and Woods Cross. Continuing north once again, the Interstate reaches its next interchange, which is with 500 South (SR-68). Parts of this interchange are spread over three cities, with Woods Cross on the south, a panhandle of Bountiful in the middle, and West Bountiful on the north. Continuing north, it comes to another partial interchange with 400 North, which only includes a northbound offramp and a southbound onramp. After a slight jog to the east comes the junction with US 89 (500 West). This junction straddles the north–south border between West Bountiful and Bountiful. It is also a partial interchange in that it has only a southbound offramp and a northbound onramp. It also is the beginning of the second 1-15 / US 89 overlap.

Continuing north, it leaves West Bountiful and enters Centerville before reaching the Parish Lane (400 North / SR-105) interchange. About a mile (1.6 km) north, I-15 begins a stretch where the Legacy Parkway (SR-67) parallels the Interstate on the west, with little more than train tracks in between. About another mile (1.6 km) north, the freeway leaves Centerville and enters Farmington. Next comes the partial interchange with 200 West (SR-227), which only includes a northbound offramp and a southbound onramp. Heading north-northeast, it reaches the I-15 / Legacy Highway / US 89 / Park Lane (SR-225) interchange. This sprawling interchange provides a northbound offramp and southbound onramp for US 89, a southbound offramp and a northbound onramp for Legacy Parkway, as well connection with Park Lane. The interchange is just west of the Lagoon amusement park and is the end of the second I-15 / US 89 overlap. From this interchange, it heads northwest before leaving Farmington and entering Kaysville.

Just inside Kaysville are two former rest areas. While the ramps and parking areas are still intact, there are no signage or facilities remaining. Further on is the Kaysville (200 North / SR-273) interchange. Continuing northwest, I-15 leaves Kaysville and enters Layton, along with its three interchanges. The first interchange is with Layton Parkway and just north of it, the express lanes end, leaving just three lanes in each direction. The next two interchanges are with Hill Field Road (SR-232) and then Antelope Drive (2000 North / SR-108). After leaving Layton, the Interstate enters Clearfield and reaches the 700 South (SR-193) interchange. From this interchange, north I-15 runs along the western edge of Hill Air Force Base. The next interchange is with 650 North, which also provides direct access to the west part of the airforce base. Just after this interchange, the freeway leaves Clearfield, turns north, and enters Sunset, but has no further interchanges before leaving that city and Davis County.

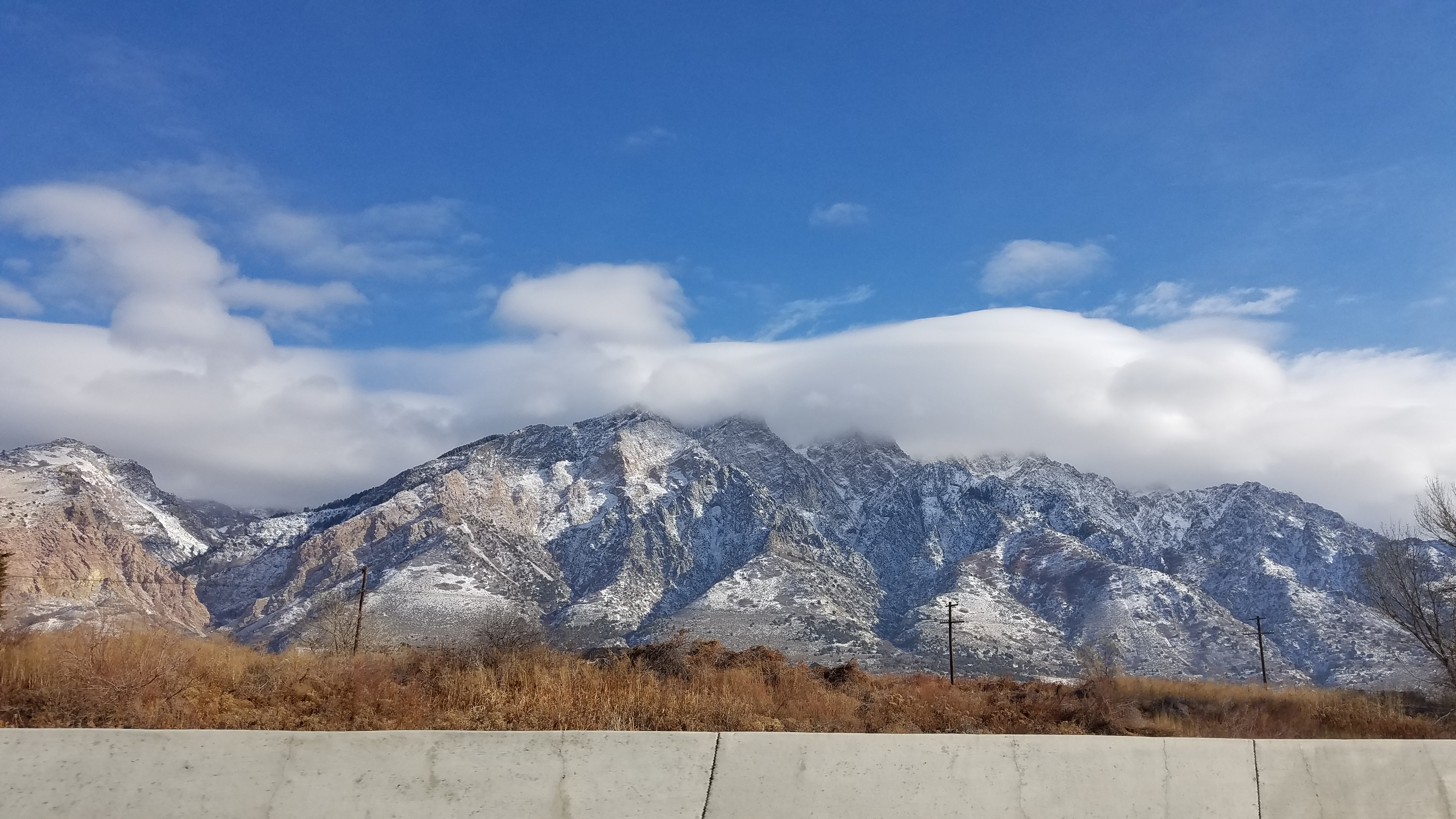
The Wasatch Mountains from I-15 near Willard, UT

Just prior to the next interchange, I-15 enters Weber County and the city of Roy. After curving slightly to the east, the freeway reaches the 5600 South (SR-97) interchange, which provides access to the north end of the airforce base, including the Hill Aerospace Museum that is located immediately north of the base. The next interchange is with Riverdale Road (SR-26). As a partial interchange, there is only a northbound offramp to eastbound SR-26 and a southbound onramp from westbound SR-26. (Eastbound SR-26 provides the only access to eastbound I-84.) At this interchange, the Interstate also transitions from Roy to Riverdale. Heading northwest, I-15 then merges with I-84, but there is no northbound access to I-84 nor westbound access from I-84 to I-15. This also begins the I-15/I-84 overlap. Immediately northwest of this interchange is the Ogden-Hinckley Airport; however, since the airport is slightly above hill, it is not visible from the freeway. Two additional lanes are added north of this junction for a total of four in each direction. Just after leaving Riverdale, the Interstate enters Ogden and reaches the 31st Street (3100 South / SR-79) interchange. Curving back to the northwest, the freeway comes to the 24th South (SR-53) interchange. Although the signage specifies "24th Street", this partial interchange (which only provides a northbound offramp and a southbound onramp) is actually with Pennsylvania Avenue (also SR-53), which promptly connects with 24th Street (2400 South) northeast of the interchange.

As it leaves Ogden and enters West Haven, I-15 curves to the north-northwest before coming to the 21st Street (2100 South / SR-104) interchange. The freeway then leaves West Haven and enters Marriott-Slaterville and immediately crosses the Weber River. The next interchange is with 12th Street (1200 South / SR-39), at which point the freeway loses one lane in each direction. Continuing on with three lanes in each direction, the Interstate reaches the 400 North interchange. Similar to the 24th Street interchange, although signage indicates "400 North", this interchanges actually connects with Pioneer Road, which promptly connects with 400 North just east of the interchange. North of this interchange, I-15 heads directly north to leave Marriott-Slaterville and enter Farr West. Continuing north, it reaches the 2700 North (SR-134) before it curves to the north-northwest and leaves Farr West and Weber County. At the 2700 North interchange, the freeway narrows to two lanes in each direction and remains so for the remainder of its route in Utah.

==== Box Elder County ====
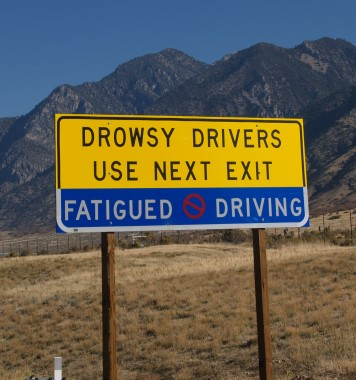
I-15 warning sign for potentially drowsy drivers

Upon entering the final county (Box Elder) along its route in Utah, I-15 also enters the area of South Willard and then reaches the Willard (2000 West / SR-126) interchange. (SR-126 connects with US 89 just west of the interchange.) Before leaving the South Willard area and entering the city of Willard, I-15 begins about a two-mile (3.2 km) stretch that runs along the western shore of the Willard Bay of the Great Salt Lake. Its next interchange is with 750 North / SR-315. Straddling the northern border between Willard and Perry are ports of entry for both directions of traffic. Continuing north through Perry, it passes a rest area for northbound traffic before it reaches the next interchange, which is with 1100 South (US 91). This interchange straddles the northern border of Perry and the southern border of Brigham City. (US 91 continues northeast to Logan and points northward.) Curving slightly to the west, the Interstate reaches the Forest Street interchange, followed by the 900 North (SR-13) interchange. Immediately north of 900 North, the freeway passes immediately to the west of the Brigham City Airport. West of the airport, there is also a rest area for southbound traffic. At the north end of the airport, the freeway leaves Brigham City and, before continuing on a slightly more westerly, northern course.

After about a mile (1.6 km) in unincorporated Box Elder County, I-15 enters Honeyville and then reaches the Honeyville / Bear River (6900 North / SR-240) interchange. Continuing northwest, the Interstate leaves Honeyville and immediately crosses the Bear River. It then enters the town of Elwood and reaches the Tremonton/Garland (5200 West / SR-13) interchange. The freeway then leaves Elwood and enters Tremonton shortly after that. Just inside Tremonton is the I-15/I-84/SR-30 junction. From this junction, I-84 and SR-30 head northwest to Snowville and on to Burley and Boise, Idaho, while I-15 continues north through Tremonton. This interchange is also the northern end of the I-15/I-84 overlap and the southern end of the I-15/SR-30 overlap. Straddling the northern city limits of Tremonton is another interchange signed as "Tremonton/Garland". This second interchange of the same name is with 1000 North. Curving slightly to the east, it passes by the western edge of Garland before coming to the Riverside (15200 North / SR-30) interchange, which is just southwest of that city and is the northern end of the I-15/SR-30 overlap. Continuing a slightly winding course north, the Interstate reaches the Plymouth (20800 North / SR-13) interchange, which is just northwest of that town. Heading north and then to the northeast, the freeway reaches the Portage (25800 North / Center Street), which is the last interchange in the state and is just east of that town. About a mile (1.6 km) north of the last interchange is the Utah–Idaho border, where I-15 leaves the Ogden–Clearfield metropolitan area. From there, I-15 continues north to Malad City and on to Pocatello.

== History ==
The southwest–north alignment followed by I-15 was a major transportation corridor in the early 20th century, followed by auto trails such as the Arrowhead Trail (south from Salt Lake City), Evergreen National Highway (entire length), and Banff–Grand Canyon Road (north from Nephi). In 1926, when the numbered system of U.S. highways was created, this route was signed US 91.

The route of I-15 from St. George to Brigham City was built along the corridor of what was US 91 from 1926 to 1974. In 1974, I-15 was reasonably intact and US 91 was deleted, with the unfinished segments signed as Temporary I-15. The route north of Brigham City was built along the corridor of an old routing of US 191. This highway was also deleted once I-15 was reasonably intact. However, a different route in Utah was redesignated US 191 in 1982. Also, by the time it completed the section, UDOT recalibrated the mileposts and renumbered the exits, reducing the overall distance by approximately three miles (4.8 km).

In 1975, UDOT would construct a wildlife crossing located near the town of Beaver. The Utah Division of Wildlife Resources considers this to be the first wildlife overpass built in the United States.

Before 1977 the route of I-15 (and US 91 before) was also designated SR-1 by the state of Utah, but no portion of the route was signed with this number.

The last section of I-15 within the state of Utah (as well as the entire length of the route) was completed in November 1990, only to have major reconstruction projects commence (starting in Salt Lake County) about 7 years later. The entire length of I-15 within Utah was designated by the Utah Legislature in 1998 as the Veterans Memorial Highway.

In 2004, UDOT renumbered the mile markers along I-15 north of Nephi. (When I-15 was originally built, there were several large gaps along the route, including south of Nephi. In addition, the original plans for I-15 were to run along the west side of Nephi, instead of the final alignment along the city's east side. Mileage along the unconstructed sections was estimated. After the entire length of the freeway was completed, there was a discrepancy of an extra three miles (4.8 km) along all sections north of Nephi. UDOT had been aware of the problem for many years but delayed corrective action for the issue.) The following year, in 2005, UDOT renumbered the exits to correspond to the corrected mile markers. The result was exit numbers north of Nephi were reduced by three.

In January 2009, the speed limit on two sections of I-15 together totaling 34 miles (55 km) was raised to 80 mph (130 km/h) as a "test", making Utah the second state to have speed limits greater than 75 mph (121 km/h). In September 2013, with a few brief exceptions, the speed limit north of Leeds (other than the Wasatch Front, between Santaquin and Brigham City) was raised to 80 mph (130 km/h).

In 2015, the UDOT raised the speed limit on the Wasatch Front urban stretch through Salt Lake City to 70 mph (110 km/h). Also, in 2016, the speed limit through the St. George metro area was raised to 70 mph (110 km/h).

As of October 2016, the longest continuous high-occupancy-vehicle (HOV) facility in the U.S. is on I-15 in Utah, extending approximately 72.0 miles (115.9 km) from Spanish Fork to Layton with a single HOV lane each direction for a total of 144.0 miles (231.7 km) of HOV lanes. As of October 2022, an additional 10 miles in each direction was added extending the lanes from Spanish Fork to Riverdale for a total of 164 miles of HOV lanes.

== Reconstruction projects ==
=== I-15 corridor reconstruction project ===
Taking place between April 1997 and July 2001, the I-15 reconstruction project was the Utah Department of Transportation's first major Interstate reconstruction project. The project involved the renovation of 16.2 miles (26.1 km) of I-15 from 600 North in Salt Lake City to 10600 South (SR-151) in Sandy. Improvements included repaving concrete, adding another general-purpose lane and a high-occupancy-vehicle (HOV) lane, along with an auxiliary lane between major interchanges in each direction through the Salt Lake City metropolitan area. Approximately 130 bridges were either constructed or reconstructed, including the conversion of seven diamond interchanges into single point urban interchanges, and the reconstruction of three major junctions with other Interstate and state routes, including I-80, SR-201, and I-215. In addition, a traffic management system was added to the entire length of the Interstate in the Salt Lake County region. This reconstruction cost $1.63 billion, with $448 million being federally funded and $1,184 million being funded by Utah.

=== EXPRESSLink project ===
The I-15 EXPRESSLink project took place between December 2008 and fall 2010. It involved the renovation of I-15 between 500 North in Salt Lake City and the northern terminus of I-215 in North Salt Lake. Renovations included new concrete and added a high-occupancy-vehicle (HOV) lane in both directions. In order to accommodate the new width of the freeway, bridges at Beck Street, US 89, and 1100 North were replaced. The bridges at 800 North and 1100 North were replaced by one bridge at 1100 North.

=== 11400 South interchange addition ===
A new single point interchange was constructed between 2008 and November 2010 at 11400 South in Draper. The project also widened I-15 from 10600 South to just past 11400 South from three to four general purpose lanes, extended the high-occupancy-vehicle (HOV) lane that previously ended at 10600 South, and added an auxiliary lane between the two interchanges.

=== I-15 CORE project ===
The I-15 Corridor Expansion (CORE) project was a design–build project that reconstructed 24 miles (39 km) of I-15 in Utah County, Utah between Lehi Main Street to 8000 South Spanish Fork. The $1.725 billion project was the fastest billion-dollar public highway project ever completed in the United States. The project was completed on December 15, 2012—35 months from the original notice to proceed—and finished $260 million under budget (coming in at $1.465 billion total). I-15 CORE widened the freeway by two lanes in each direction and replaced the original asphalt with new 40-year concrete pavement; rebuilt 63 bridges; reconstructed 10 freeway interchanges; and extended the high-occupancy-vehicle (HOV) lanes from Orem to Spanish Fork. (Prior to I-15 CORE, HOV lanes had already been installed from Lehi to Orem.)

=== South Davis improvements ===
The South Davis Improvements project, which took place between April 2014 and August 2015, constructed new high-occupancy-vehicle (HOV) lanes between the I-215 interchange in North Salt Lake and the US 89 interchange in Farmington; replaced I-15 bridges at 2600 South, 1500 South, 500 South (SR-68), and 400 North (SR-106); reconfigured the interchange at 2600 South into a partial and 500 South into a full diverging diamond interchange; and added active transportation improvements, with better pedestrian and bicycle facilities at 500 South, 400 North, and Parrish Lane. The entire project costed $126 million.

=== The Point Project ===
The two-year Point Project widened I-15 from four to six lanes in each direction between 12300 South in Draper and SR-92 in Lehi, a distance of approximately seven miles (11 km). The project also replaced the existing pavement with new 40-year concrete, reconstructed the 14600 South (SR-140) interchange as a single-point urban interchange to improve traffic flow, and installed new traffic management technology such as cameras, ramp meters, electronic message signs, and fiber optics. The project cost $215 million. With the completion of The Point project, nearly all of I-15 along the Wasatch Front has been reconstructed within the past two decades. One last section in Lehi, from SR-92 to Main Street (SR-73) remained and was widened spring 2018.

=== I-15 Technology Corridor ===
The Utah Department of Transportation reconstructed the I-15 Technology Corridor between Lehi Main Street and SR-92 (Timpanogos Highway) starting in 2018. The Tech Corridor was the last section of I-15 in Utah County to be reconstructed in recent years. The actual construction elements included was based on the results of the ongoing engineering, traffic, and cost analysis. Those elements include I-15 reconstructed and widened with two new lanes in each direction from Lehi Main Street to SR-92, a one-way frontage road system from 2100 North to SR-92, interchange reconstruction at SR-92 and 2100 North, 13 bridge replacements, a new Triumph Boulevard bridge over I-15, and bike and pedestrian improvements. The final cost for the project was $415 million.

Future elements not being constructed at this time are expected to include a new North Lehi interchange, a one-way frontage road system extended from SR-92 to the new North Lehi interchange, and freeway-to-freeway connector ramps at 2100 North to connect I-15 to the future Mountain View Corridor freeway.

=== I-15 Davis-Weber Express Lanes ===
The Utah Department of Transportation extended the I-15 HOV/Toll Express Lanes from the Layton Parkway interchange to the Riverdale Road interchange. Construction began in May 2019 and was completed in October 2022. An HOV/Toll lane was added to both the northbound and southbound directions along the 10-mile (16 km) corridor to accommodate the growing population and traffic in northern Davis County and southern Weber County. The project included additional improvements; the I-15 bridges at Church Street and 200 South were replaced and widened, an auxiliary lane was added from Layton Parkway to Hill Field Road, bridges at Gentile Street, 700 South, Union Pacific Railroad bridge, and 5600 South were widened and the bridge decks were replaced, the bridge at 650 North was widened, and new ramp metering was installed at the on ramps of Antelope Drive, 700 South, 650 North, and Riverdale Road. Express Lane tolling began along this corridor on October 31, 2022.

=== The I-15 Southbound Project ===
The I-15 Southbound Project added a general purpose lane from Utah SR-201 in Salt Lake City and South Salt Lake, affectionately known as "The Spaghetti Bowl", to 12300 South in Draper. In addition, the I-15/I-215 interchange in Midvale was modified, where traffic from westbound I-215 now enters directly onto I-15 prior to the 7200 South exit, instead of merging with I-215 eastbound traffic on the collector/distributor ramp then entering onto I-15 after 7200 South. The 7200 South on and off ramps were reconstructed to accommodate this modification. 7200 South was expanded to three lanes from I-15 to Bingham Blvd in both directions and the Union Pacific Rail Road Bridge (USRR) over 7200 South was reconstructed.

The I-15 portion of this project started in the spring of 2018. A new general purpose lane from 7800 South to 12300 South was completed in December 2018 and the new general purpose lane from SR-201 to 7200 South was completed in 2020.

== Future/Planned Projects ==
=== 1800 North Interchange ===
The Utah Department of Transportation is in the preliminary stages of the design of a new interchange along I-15 at 1800 North. Additional funding was recently added to the project that will widen 1800 North from I-15 to 2000 West, providing improved mobility to residents of Sunset and Davis County at large. 1800 North will be reconstructed in concrete pavement and widened to include two lanes in each direction and a center turn lane, 12-foot shoulders, and a new curb, gutter, and sidewalk. Construction was originally scheduled to begin in 2023. However, with the additional funding nearly doubling the size and effort necessary to design the improvements, construction will begin in 2025.

=== Shepard Lane Interchange ===
The Utah Department of Transportation completed the Shepard Lane environmental assessment in July 2020. The study determined that a new interchange along with widening and providing a direct connection to 1500 West would improve safety and reduce congestion on mainline I-15 and US-89 by decreasing demand on Park Lane.

Construction of the Shepard Lane interchange started in late February 2024.

=== I-15 Farmington to Salt Lake City ===
In March 2022, the Utah Department of Transportation initiated an Environmental Impact Statement (EIS) for the Interstate 15 (I-15) Farmington to Salt Lake City Project. A 2019-2050 Regional Transportation Plan includes two projects that identify improvements to I-15 in Davis and Salt Lake Counties:

• I-15 widening (from 5 lanes to 6 lanes in each direction) from Farmington to Salt Lake County line

• I-15 widening (from 4 and 5 lanes to 6 lanes in each direction) in Davis County to 600 North

The purpose of this EIS project is to conduct a thorough analysis of I-15 and identify a preferred solution.

Construction of this project may begin as early as 2028.

== Express Lanes (HOV/Tolling lanes) ==
=== HOV Lanes introduced in Utah ===
Beginning with the I-15 corridor reconstruction project completed in 2001, HOV lanes were introduced in Utah for the first time. The HOV lanes were available in both northbound and southbound directions spanning between 600 North in Salt Lake City and 10600 South in Sandy. Initially the HOV lanes were non-tolling and there were no designated entrance/exit segments along I-15. This lane was designated by a single solid 8-inch white line. High occupancy vehicles could cross this line at any time to enter/exit the HOV lane. Later on tolling was introduced and designated entrance/exit areas were added. Due to this change, 8-inch double solid white lines were added to the roadway and signs were added to the median stating "Do Not Cross Double White Line". A fine is imposed for illegally crossing the double white lines, except when emergency vehicles are present where a motorist may cross the double white lines so that the emergency vehicle may pass safely. Express Lane entrance/exit segments are now designated by a single dotted 8-inch white line. These segments are typically placed over interchanges, wherever possible, beginning at the exit ramp and ending at the entrance ramp of any interchange. This design allows motorists to enter and exit the Express Lanes when other vehicles are not also merging on and off the freeway.

=== Additions to the Express Lanes ===
After 2001, the Express Lanes were extended to the south in various phases. Beginning with an extension from 10600 South in Sandy to Bangerter Highway, then from Bangerter Highway to Lehi Main Street, then from Lehi to Provo and eventually from Provo to Spanish Fork. Express Lanes were extended to the north in various phases as well. Beginning with an extension from 600 North in Salt Lake City to the Davis County Line in North Salt Lake. A second phase was added from the US 89 interchange in Farmington to Layton, then a third phase filled the gap between the Davis County Line in North Salt Lake and Farmington, and finally the most recent segment was added from Layton Parkway to Riverdale Road.

=== Longest continuous Carpool Lane segment in the United States ===
With the completion of the South Davis Improvements in 2015, the Express Lanes or "Carpool lanes" in Northern Utah were, and continue to be, the longest continuous segment of carpool lanes in the United States. Between 2015 and 2022 the lanes spanned 72 miles in both directions between Spanish Fork and Layton. The I-15 Davis-Weber Express Lanes project further extended the lanes, now spanning 82 miles in both directions between Spanish Fork and Riverdale beginning in 2022.

=== Express Lane constraints and exceptions ===
Prior to completion of the South Davis Improvement project, there were no Express Lanes available between North Salt Lake and Farmington. This gap was the result of insufficient funding for bridge reconstruction in Davis County until the South Davis Improvements project was funded. Another constraint is the southbound I-15 exit at 500 West (US 89) in West Bountiful is a left lane exit, which would require general purpose traffic to enter the Express Lane in order to exit onto 500 West (US 89). The solution to this was to designate the HOV lane between Parrish Lane in Centerville and the 500 West (US 89) left exit as an HOV entrance/exit area with no left lane restrictions. Large white overhead signs on I-15 approaching the Parrish Lane interchange state the left lane restrictions end for the 500 West Left Exit. Immediately after this left lane exit the HOV and left lane restrictions resume.

== Exit list ==
In 2005, all exits north of Nephi were renumbered to eliminate a milepost equation. The original surveyed route for I-15 in the 1960s passed Nephi to the west; however, by the time the route was actually constructed in the 1980s, the plans were changed to pass Nephi to the east, resulting in a discrepancy in the exit numbers north of Nephi from actual mileage.

| County | Location | mi | km | Old exit | New exit | Destinations | Notes |
|---|---|---|---|---|---|---|---|
| Washington | | 0.000 | 0.000 | | | I-15 south – Las Vegas | Continuation into Arizona |
| Washington | St. George | 0.462 | 0.744 | 1 | | Port of Entry | |
| Washington | St. George | 2.135 | 3.436 | | 2 | SR-7 east (Southern Parkway) | Western terminus of SR-7 |
| Washington | St. George | 4.641 | 7.469 | | 4 | Brigham Road | |
| Washington | St. George | 5.619 | 9.043 | | 5 | Dixie Drive | |
| Washington | St. George | 6.309 | 10.153 | | 6 | I-15 BL north / SR-18 north (Bluff Street) | Southern terminus of SR-18 |
| Washington | St. George | | | | 7 | 700 South | Construction started but postponed indefinitely |
| Washington | St. George | 8.652 | 13.924 | | 8 | I-15 BL south / SR-34 west (St. George Boulevard) | Diverging diamond interchange |
| Washington | Washington | 10.910 | 17.558 | | 10 | Green Springs Drive | Former SR-212 |
| Washington | Washington | | | | 12 | Main Street | Opened around November 2024 |
| Washington | Washington | 13.386 | 21.543 | | 13 | Washington Parkway | |
| Washington | Washington–Hurricane line | 15.888 | 25.569 | | 16 | SR-9 east (State Street) | |
| Washington | Leeds | 22.579 | 36.337 | | 22 | SR-228 north (Main Street) | Northbound exit and southbound entrance |
| Washington | Leeds | 23.703 | 38.146 | | 23 | SR-228 (Silver Reef Road) | Southbound exit and northbound entrance |
| Washington | Toquerville | 27.470 | 44.209 | | 27 | SR-17 south – Toquerville, Hurricane | Northern terminus of SR-17 |
| Washington | Toquerville | 30.682 | 49.378 | | 30 | Browse | |
| Washington | | 31.861 | 51.275 | | 31 | Pintura | |
| Washington | | 33.435 | 53.808 | | 33 | Snowfield | |
| Washington | | 36.763 | 59.164 | | 36 | Black Ridge | |
| Washington | | 40.253 | 64.781 | | 40 | Kolob Canyons | |
| Washington | | 42.159 | 67.848 | | 42 | New Harmony, Kanarraville | Former SR-58 & former SR-144 |
| Iron | | 44.132 | 71.024 | | | Rest Area | |
| Iron | | 51.149 | 82.316 | | 51 | Hamilton Fort, Kanarraville | Former SR-58 |
| Iron | Cedar City | 56.787 | 91.390 | | 57 | I-15 BL north / SR-130 (South Main Street) to SR-14 east | Southern terminus of SR-130 |
| Iron | Cedar City | 58.837 | 94.689 | | 59 | SR-56 (200 North) | |
| Iron | Cedar City | 62.497 | 100.579 | | 62 | I-15 BL south (North Main Street) / SR-130 to SR-14 east | |
| Iron | | 70.263 | 113.077 | | 71 | Summit, Enoch | Former SR-38 |
| Iron | Parowan | 75.183 | 120.995 | | 75 | I-15 BL north / SR-143 | Western terminus of SR-143 |
| Iron | Parowan | 77.801 | 125.209 | | 78 | I-15 BL south / SR-274 (Main Street) to SR-143 / SR-271 – Parowan, Paragonah | Northern terminus of SR-274 |
| Iron | | 82.253 | 132.373 | | 82 | SR-271 south (Main Street) – Paragonah | Northern terminus of SR-271 |
| Iron | | 87.418 | 140.686 | | | Rest Area | |
| Iron | | 94.453 | 152.007 | | 95 | SR-20 to US 89 – Panguitch, Circleville, Kanab | Western terminus of SR-20 |
| Iron | | 99.690 | 160.436 | | 100 | Fremont Wash | Formerly signed as Ranch Exit |
| Beaver | Beaver | 108.745 | 175.008 | | 109 | I-15 BL / SR-160 north to SR-21 / SR-153 – Beaver, Milford | |
| Beaver | Beaver | 111.780 | 179.892 | | 112 | I-15 BL / SR-160 south to SR-21 / SR-153 – Beaver, Milford, Manderfield | |
| Beaver | | 120.126 | 193.324 | | 120 | Manderfield | |
| Beaver | | 125.009 | 201.182 | 125 | | Ranch Exit | |
| Beaver | | 129.438 | 208.310 | | 129 | Sulphurdale | |
| Millard | | 132.170 | 212.707 | | 132 | I-70 east – Richfield, Denver | Western terminus of Interstate 70 |
| Millard | | 134.875 | 217.060 | | 135 | SR-161 south (Historic Cove Fort) | Northern terminus of SR-161 |
| Millard | | 138.073 | 222.207 | | 138 | Dog Valley | Formerly signed as Ranch Exit |
| Millard | | 146.493 | 235.758 | | 146 | Kanosh | Former SR-133 |
| Millard | Meadow | 158.265 | 254.703 | | 158 | SR-133 south – Kanosh | Northern terminus of SR-133 |
| Millard | Fillmore | 163.370 | 262.919 | | 163 | I-15 BL / SR-99 north to SR-100 west – Fillmore | |
| Millard | Fillmore | 166.723 | 268.315 | | 167 | I-15 BL / SR-99 south to SR-100 west – Fillmore | |
| Millard | | 173.507 | 279.232 | | 174 | SR-64 to US 50 – Delta, Holden | Southern terminus of SR-64 |
| Millard | | 178.330 | 286.994 | | 178 | US 50 west – Delta, Holden | South end of US-50 overlap |
| Millard | | 183.638 | 295.537 | | 184 | Tower Road | Formerly signed as Ranch Exit |
| Millard | Scipio | 188.439 | 303.263 | | 188 | US 50 east – Scipio | North end of US-50 overlap |
| Juab | | 202.189 | 325.392 | | 202 | Yuba State Park | |
| Juab | | 206.553 | 332.415 | | 207 | SR-78 east – Mills | Southern terminus of SR-78 |
| Juab | Nephi | 222.812 | 358.581 | | 222 | I-15 BL north / SR-28 (South Main Street) | |
| Juab | Nephi | 225.248 | 362.502 | | 225 | SR-132 (100 North) | |
| Juab | | 228.065 | 367.035 | | 228 | I-15 BL / SR-28 south – Nephi | Former SR-41 |
| Juab | Mona | 233.161 | 375.236 | 236 | 233 | SR-54 – Mona | Eastern terminus of SR-54 |
| Utah | Santaquin | 242.447 | 390.181 | 245 | 242 | Summit Ridge Parkway | |
| Utah | Santaquin | 244.788 | 393.948 | 248 | 244 | US 6 west (East Main Street) | South end of US-6 overlap |
| Utah | Payson | 248.829 | 400.451 | 252 | 248 | SR-178 east (800 South) | Western terminus of SR-178 |
| Utah | Payson | 250.923 | 403.821 | 254 | 250 | SR-115 (Main Street) | |
| Utah | Salem | 253.557 | 408.060 | 256 | 253 | SR-164 (8000 South) – Spanish Fork, Benjamin | Western terminus of SR-164 |
| Utah | Spanish Fork | 257.246 | 413.997 | 260 | 257A | SR-156 south (Main Street) | Northern terminus of SR-156 |
| Utah | Spanish Fork | 257.666 | 414.673 | | 257B | US 6 east – Price | North end of US-6 overlap |
| Utah | Spanish Fork | 257.636 | 414.625 | 261 | 258 | US 6 east | Exit reconfigured as exit 257B |
| Utah | Spanish Fork–Springville line | | | | 258 | Dry Creek Parkway | No southbound onramp; opened on July 10, 2026 |
| Utah | Springville | 259.963 | 418.370 | 263 | 260 | SR-77 (400 South) | |
| Utah | Springville | 261.781 | 421.296 | 265 | 261 | SR-75 east (1400 North) | Western terminus of SR-75 |
| Utah | Provo | 263.358 | 423.834 | 266 | 263 | US 189 north (South University Avenue) / Lakeview Parkway | Southern terminus of US 189 |
| Utah | Provo | 265.364 | 427.062 | 268 | 265 | SR-114 (Center Street) | |
| Utah | Orem | 269.072 | 433.029 | 272 | 269 | SR-265 (University Parkway) | |
| Utah | Orem | 270.660 | 435.585 | 274 | 271 | Center Street | |
| Utah | Orem | 271.670 | 437.210 | 275 | 272 | SR-52 (800 North) to US 189 | |
| Utah | Orem–Lindon line | 272.767 | 438.976 | 276 | 273 | SR-241 (1600 North) | |
| Utah | Pleasant Grove | 275.279 | 443.019 | 278 | 275 | SR-135 (Pleasant Grove Boulevard) | |
| Utah | American Fork | 276.436 | 444.881 | 279 | 276 | SR-180 north (500 East) | Southern terminus of SR-180 |
| Utah | American Fork | 278.493 | 448.191 | 281 | 278 | SR-145 (Main Street) | |
| Utah | Lehi | 279.701 | 450.135 | 282 | 279 | SR-73 (Main Street) | |
| Utah | Lehi | 282.311 | 454.336 | 285 | 282 | US 89 south (2100 North) / SR-194 west | South end of US-89 overlap |
| Utah | Lehi | 282.930 | 455.332 | | 283 | Triumph Boulevard | No northbound exit |
| Utah | Lehi | 283.985 | 457.030 | 287 | 284 | SR-92 (Timpanogos Highway) – Highland, Alpine | Western terminus of SR-92 |
| Salt Lake | Draper | 288.272 | 463.929 | 291 | 288 | SR-140 west (14600 South) | Eastern terminus of SR-140 |
| Salt Lake | Draper | 289.832 | 466.439 | 293 | 289 | SR-154 (Bangerter Highway) | Southern terminus of SR-154 |
| Salt Lake | Draper | 291.358 | 468.895 | 294 | 291 | US 89 north / SR-71 (12300 South) | North end of US-89 overlap |
| Salt Lake | Draper | | | 295 | | US 89 north (State Street) – Sandy | Closed |
| Salt Lake | Draper–Sandy– South Jordan tripoint | 292.612 | 470.913 | | 292 | SR-175 (11400 South) | |
| Salt Lake | Sandy–South Jordan line | 293.634 | 472.558 | 297 | 293 | SR-151 (10600 South) | Eastern terminus of SR-151 |
| Salt Lake | Sandy–South Jordan line | 294.920 | 474.628 | | 294A-C | SR-48 (7200 South) / I-215 (Belt Route) | Northbound exit only to collector-distributor lanes; signed as exits 294A (SR-48), 294B (I-215 east), and 294C (I-215 west) |
| Salt Lake | Sandy–South Jordan line | 295.616 | 475.748 | 298 | 295 | SR-209 (9000 South) | |
| Salt Lake | Midvale | 297.920 | 479.456 | 301 | 297 | SR-48 (7200 South) | No northbound exit |
| Salt Lake | Murray | 299.005 | 481.202 | 302 | 298 | I-215 (Belt Route) | Signed as exits 298A (east) and 298B (west); no northbound exit; southbound entrance from eastbound I-215 includes direct exit to SR-48 (7200 South) |
| Salt Lake | Murray | 300.300 | 483.286 | 303 | 300 | SR-173 (5300 South) | |
| Salt Lake | Murray | 301.653 | 485.463 | 304 | 301 | SR-266 (4500 South) | |
| Salt Lake | South Salt Lake | 303.414 | 488.298 | 306 | 303 | SR-171 (3300 South) | |
| Salt Lake | South Salt Lake | 304.691 | 490.353 | 307 | 304 | I-80 east – Cheyenne | "Spaghetti Bowl" interchange; south end of I-80 overlap |
| Salt Lake | South Salt Lake | 305.231 | 491.222 | 308A | 305A | SR-201 west (2100 South Freeway) / 900 West – West Valley | Exit formerly unsigned southbound; part of the "Spaghetti Bowl" interchange |
| Salt Lake | South Salt Lake | 305.198 | 491.169 | 308B | 305B | 2100 South (SR-201) | Formerly signed as exit 308 southbound |
| Salt Lake | Salt Lake City | 306.315 | 492.966 | 309A | 305C | 1300 South | Formerly signed as exit 309 southbound |
| Salt Lake | Salt Lake City | 306.607 | 493.436 | 309B | 305D | 900 South (SR-270) | Northbound exit and southbound entrance; southern terminus of SR-270 |
| Salt Lake | Salt Lake City | 307.500 | 494.873 | 310 | 306 | 600 South (SR-269) | Northbound exit and southbound entrance; western terminus of SR-269 |
| Salt Lake | Salt Lake City | 307.740 | 495.260 | 310 | 307 | 400 South | HOV/toll access only; northbound exit and southbound entrance |
| Salt Lake | Salt Lake City | 307.740 | 495.260 | 310 | 307 | 400 South | Southbound exit and northbound entrance |
| Salt Lake | Salt Lake City | 308.079 | 495.805 | 311 | 308 | I-80 west – Salt Lake City International Airport, Reno | North end of I-80 overlap |
| Salt Lake | Salt Lake City | 309.333 | 497.823 | 312 | 309 | SR-268 east (600 North) | Western terminus of SR-268 |
| Salt Lake | Salt Lake City | 310.239 | 499.281 | 313 | 310 | 1000 North | No northbound exit |
| Salt Lake | Salt Lake City | 311.792 | 501.781 | 314 | 311 | 2300 North | |
| Salt Lake–Davis county line | Salt Lake City–North Salt Lake line | 313.128 | 503.931 | 315 | 312 | US 89 south (Beck Street) | |
| Davis | North Salt Lake | 313.275 | 504.167 | 316 | 313 | I-215 south (Belt Route) – Salt Lake City International Airport | Southbound exit and northbound entrance |
| Davis | North Salt Lake | 314.301 | 505.818 | 317 | 314 | Center Street | Southbound exit only |
| Davis | North Salt Lake–Woods Cross line | 315.243 | 507.334 | 318 | 315 | SR-93 (2600 South) | Western terminus of SR-93 |
| Davis | Woods Cross–Bountiful– West Bountiful tripoint | 316.870 | 509.953 | 320 | 316 | SR-68 (500 South) | |
| Davis | West Bountiful | 317.557 | 511.058 | 321 | 317 | SR-106 east (400 North) | Northbound exit and southbound entrance; southern terminus of SR-106 |
| Davis | West Bountiful–Bountiful line | 318.024 | 511.810 | 321 | 317 | US 89 south (500 West) | South end of US-89 overlap; southbound left exit and northbound entrance |
| Davis | Centerville | 319.512 | 514.205 | 322 | 319 | SR-105 (Parrish Lane) | |
| Davis | Farmington | 321 | 517 | | 321 | SR-177 (West Davis Corridor) | Northbound exit and southbound entrance; southern terminus of SR-177 |
| Davis | Farmington | 322.916 | 519.683 | 325 | 322 | SR-227 north (200 West) | Northbound exit and southbound entrance; southern terminus of SR-227 |
| Davis | Farmington | 324.026 | 521.469 | 326 | 324 | US 89 north to I-84 east – South Ogden | North end of US-89 overlap; northbound exit and southbound entrance |
| Davis | Farmington | 324.243 | 521.819 | | 324 | SR-67 (Legacy Parkway) | Southbound exit and northbound entrance; northern terminus of SR-67 |
| Davis | Farmington | 324.741 | 522.620 | 327 | 325 | SR-225 (Park Lane) | Northbound access is via exit 324; western terminus of SR-225 |
| Davis | Farmington | 325.7 | 524.2 | | 326 | Shepard Lane/North Station Ln | Interchange opened June 29, 2026 |
| Davis | Kaysville | 328.640 | 528.895 | 331 | 328 | SR-273 (200 North) | Northern terminus of SR-273 |
| Davis | Layton | 330.019 | 531.114 | 332 | 330 | I-15 BL to SR-126 | Closed; was northbound exit and southbound entrance |
| Davis | Layton | 330.019 | 531.114 | | 330 | SR-126 north (Layton Parkway) | Replaced I-15 BL (Layton) exit; southern terminus of SR-126 |
| Davis | Layton | 331.589 | 533.641 | 334 | 331 | SR-232 (Hill Field Road) | |
| Davis | Layton | 332.883 | 535.723 | 335 | 332 | SR-108 (Antelope Drive) | Southern terminus of SR-108 |
| Davis | Clearfield | 334.066 | 537.627 | 336 | 334 | SR-193 (700 South) | |
| Davis | Clearfield | 335.800 | 540.418 | 338 | 335 | SR-103 (650 North) | Eastern terminus of SR-103 |
| Davis | Sunset | | | | 337 | SR-37 (1800 North) | Interchange started construction March 17, 2025. Estimated completion Fall 2027. |
| Weber | Roy | 338.447 | 544.678 | 338 | 338A | SR-97 (5600 South) | Signed as exit 338 southbound |
| Weber | Riverdale | 339.133 | 545.782 | 339 | 338B | SR-26 (Riverdale Road) to I-84 east | Northbound exit and southbound entrance |
| Weber | Riverdale | 340.227 | 547.542 | 343 | 340 | I-84 east – Cheyenne | South end of I-84 overlap; northbound access via exit 338B |
| Weber | Ogden | 341.948 | 550.312 | 344 | 341 | SR-79 (31st Street) | |
| Weber | Ogden | 343.067 | 552.113 | 345 | 342 | SR-53 (24th Street) | Northbound exit and southbound entrance; western terminus of SR-53 |
| Weber | West Haven | 343.852 | 553.376 | 346 | 343 | SR-104 (21st Street) | |
| Weber | Marriott-Slaterville | 344.968 | 555.172 | 347 | 344 | SR-39 (12th Street) | |
| Weber | Marriott-Slaterville | 346.726 | 558.001 | 349 | 346 | 400 North | |
| Weber | Farr West | 349.361 | 562.242 | 352 | 349 | SR-134 (2700 North) | |
| Box Elder | | 351.853 | 566.253 | 354 | 351 | SR-126 (2000 West) to US 89 – Willard, Pleasant View | |
| Box Elder | Willard | 357.554 | 575.427 | 360 | 357 | SR-315 (750 North) | |
| Box Elder | Willard | 358.566 | 577.056 | 361 | | Ports of Entry | |
| Box Elder | Perry | 360.542 | 580.236 | 363 | | Rest Area | Northbound only |
| Box Elder | Brigham City | 362.020 | 582.615 | 364 | 362 | US 91 (1100 South) to US 89 | Southern terminus of US 91 |
| Box Elder | Brigham City | 363.738 | 585.380 | 366 | 363 | Forest Street | |
| Box Elder | Brigham City | 365.508 | 588.228 | 368 | 365 | SR-13 (900 North Street) | |
| Box Elder | | 366.558 | 589.918 | | | Rest Area | Southbound only |
| Box Elder | Honeyville | 372.734 | 599.857 | 375 | 372 | SR-240 to SR-13 – Honeyville, Bear River | Western terminus of SR-240 |
| Box Elder | Elwood | 376.532 | 605.970 | 379 | 376 | I-15 BL / SR-13 – Garland, Bear River | |
| Box Elder | Tremonton | 379.334 | 610.479 | 382 | 379 | I-84 west – Boise | North end of I-84 overlap |
| Box Elder | Tremonton | 381.037 | 613.220 | 383 | 381 | I-15 BL south – Garland | |
| Box Elder | | 385.266 | 620.026 | 387 | 385 | SR-30 east – Riverside, Logan | |
| Box Elder | | 392.387 | 631.486 | 394 | 392 | SR-13 south – Plymouth | Northern terminus of SR-13 |
| Box Elder | | 398.817 | 641.834 | 402 | 398 | Portage | Former SR-90 |
| Box Elder | | 400.592 | 644.690 | | | I-15 north – Pocatello | Continuation into Idaho |
1.000 mi = 1.609 km; 1.000 km = 0.621 mi: Closed/former; Concurrency terminus; HOV only; Incomplete access; Unopened

Interstate 15
| Previous state: Arizona | Utah | Next state: Idaho |
