= Utah State Route 94 =

State highway in Utah, United States

State Route 94
- SR-94 highlighted in red

Route information
- Maintained by UDOT
- Length: 0.958 mi (1,542 m)
- Existed: 1969–present

Major junctions
- South end: I-70 / US 6 / US 50 in Thompson Springs
- North end: Thompson Springs

Location
- Country: United States
- State: Utah

Highway system
- Utah State Highway System; Interstate; US; State; Minor; Scenic
← SR-93	→ SR-95

State Route 94 (SR-94), located entirely within Grand County, is a 0.958-mile-long (1.542 km) minor collector state highway in the U.S. state of Utah. The highway serves as a spur route into Thompson Springs. The highway was formed in 1969, at the same time Interstate 70 (I-70) was constructed through the area.

== Route description ==
Located entirely in Grand County's Thompson Springs, SR-94 begins at a diamond interchange with exit 187 of I-70 and heads north as a two–lane undivided highway. The road turns to the northeast after passing an Exxon gas station, intersecting a local road, and then the highway forms the western border of a Utah Department of Transportation (UDOT) maintenance facility. After the maintenance facility the route turns north again and passes a mobile home court and comes to an end at an intersection with Old Cisco Highway. Across Old Cisco Highway is the former Thompson railroad depot of the Denver and Rio Grande Western Railroad.

Every year, UDOT conducts a series of surveys on its highways in the state to measure traffic volume. This is expressed in terms of average annual daily traffic (AADT), a measure of traffic volume for any average day of the year. In 2012, UDOT calculated that 740 vehicles traveled along the highway, with 51 percent of the traffic consisted of trucks. UDOT has classified the roadway as a minor collector route.

== History ==
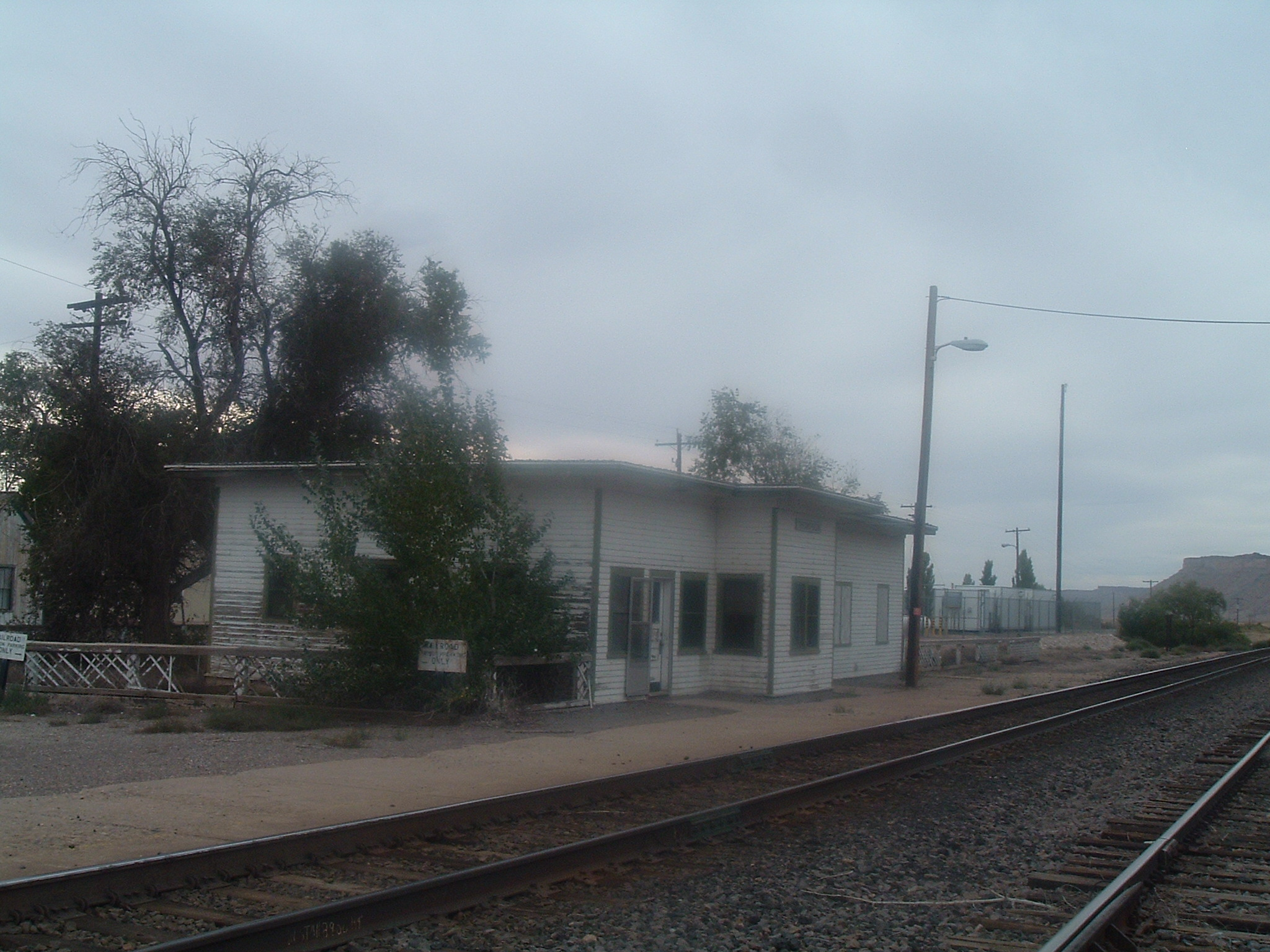
The former Thompson railroad depot at the end of SR-94

State Route 94 was formed in 1969 as a connector from I-70 to Thompson Springs. When I-70 was constructed through the area, it bypassed the town, creating a need for a connector road. The northern terminus of the route is old US-6/US-50.

== Major intersections ==
The entire route is in Thompson Springs, Grand County.

mi	km	Destinations	Notes
0.000	0.000	I-70 / US 6 / US 50 (Dinosaur Diamond Scenic Byway) – Grand Junction, Green River	Southern terminus; diamond interchange
0.666	1.072	UDOT maintenance facility	
0.958	1.542	Old Cisco Highway	Northern terminus
1.000 mi = 1.609 km; 1.000 km = 0.621 mi
