= Portage, Utah =

- Town
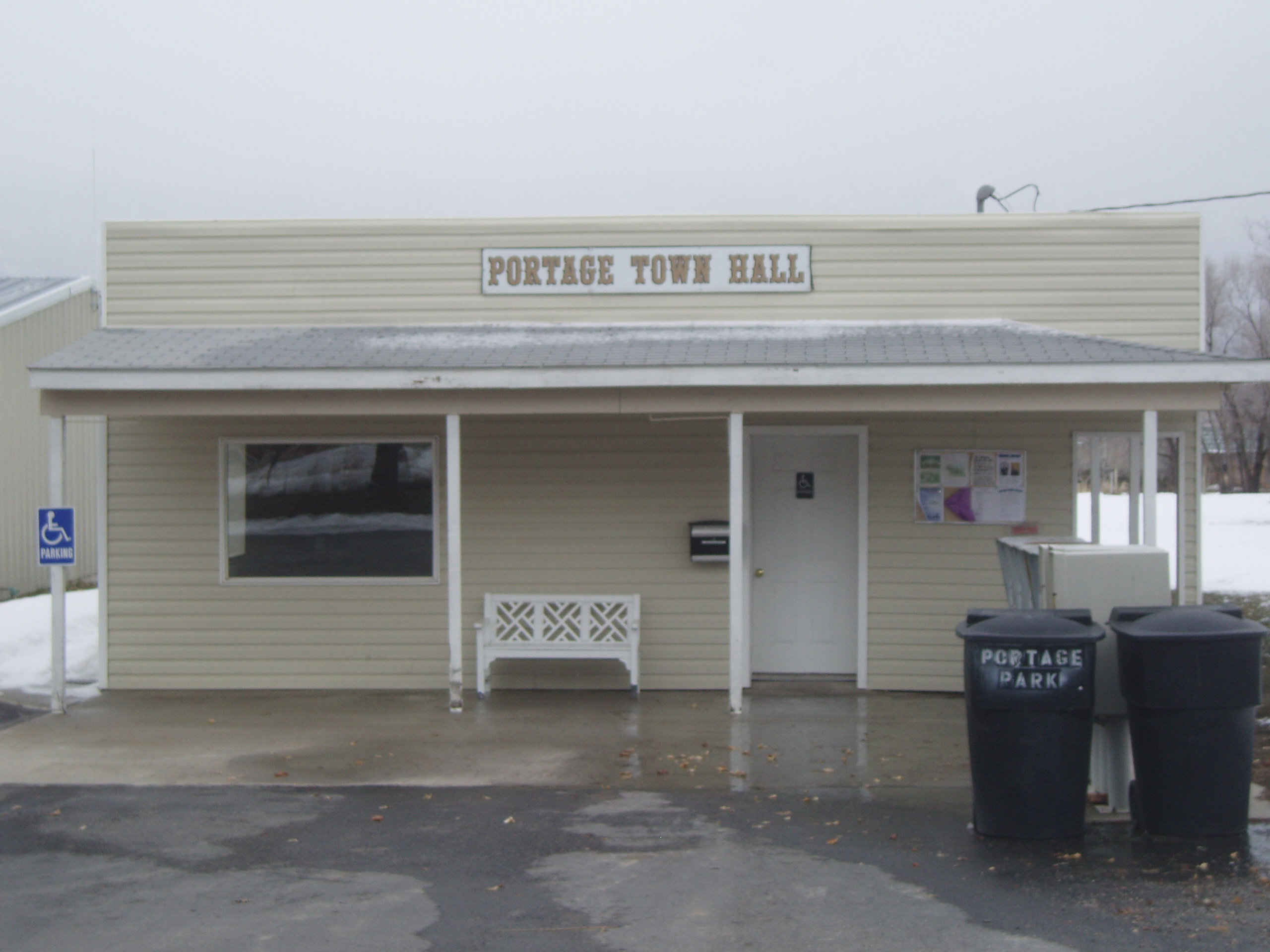
- Town Hall

- Location in Box Elder County and the state of Utah

- Location of Utah in the United States
- Coordinates: 41°59′40″N 112°14′47″W
- Country: United States
- State: Utah
- County: Box Elder
- Settled: 1867
- Incorporated: 1922
- Named for: Portage County, Ohio

Area
  - Total: 2.55 sq mi (6.61 km^{2})
  - Land: 2.55 sq mi (6.61 km^{2})
  - Water: 0 sq mi (0.00 km^{2})
- Elevation: 4,465 ft (1,361 m)

Population (2020)
  - Total: 273
  - Density: 106.9/sq mi (41.27/km^{2})
- Time zone: UTC-7 (Mountain (MST))
  - Summer (DST): UTC-6 (MDT)
- ZIP code: 84331
- Area code: 435
- FIPS code: 49-61590
- GNIS feature ID: 2412497
- Website: portageutah.com

Portage is a town in Box Elder County, Utah, United States. The population was 273 at the 2020 census. The town received its name from Lorenzo Snow, an apostle of the Church of Jesus Christ of Latter-day Saints. He named it Portage after his birthplace of Portage County, Ohio.

== Geography ==
Portage is located near the northeast corner of Box Elder County, with its northern border following the Utah-Idaho state line. It is in the Malad Valley, west of Interstate 15 on former State Route 90.

According to the United States Census Bureau, Portage covers 3.0 square miles (7.7 km^{2}), all land.

=== Climate ===
This climatic region is typified by large seasonal temperature differences, with warm to hot (and often humid) summers and cold (sometimes severely cold) winters. According to the Köppen Climate Classification system, Portage has a humid continental climate, abbreviated "Dfb" on climate maps.

== Demographics ==
Historical population
Census	Pop.	Note	%±
1870	158		—
1880	462		192.4%
1890	545		18.0%
1900	579		6.2%
1910	499		−13.8%
1920	456		−8.6%
1930	331		−27.4%
1940	342		3.3%
1950	254		−25.7%
1960	189		−25.6%
1970	144		−23.8%
1980	196		36.1%
1990	218		11.2%
2000	257		17.9%
2010	245		−4.7%
2020	273		11.4%
U.S. Decennial Census

As of the census of 2000, there were 257 people, 75 households, and 62 families residing in the town. The population density was 112.6 people per square mile (43.5/km^{2}). There were 83 housing units at an average density of 36.4 per square mile (14.1/km^{2}). The racial makeup of the town was 98.83% White, and 1.17% from two or more races. Hispanic or Latino of any race were 5.45% of the population.

There were 75 households, out of which 46.7% had children under the age of 18 living with them, 73.3% were married couples living together, 4.0% had a female householder with no husband present, and 17.3% were non-families. 14.7% of all households were made up of individuals, and 8.0% had someone living alone who was 65 years of age or older. The average household size was 3.43 and the average family size was 3.84.

In the town, the population was spread out, with 39.7% under the age of 18, 5.4% from 18 to 24, 23.7% from 25 to 44, 20.2% from 45 to 64, and 10.9% who were 65 years of age or older. The median age was 30 years. For every 100 females, there were 90.4 males. For every 100 females age 18 and over, there were 101.3 males.

The median income for a household in the town was $43,125, and the median income for a family was $48,333. Males had a median income of $45,417 versus $24,688 for females. The per capita income for the town was $13,257. About 1.7% of families and 8.7% of the population were below the poverty line, including 13.1% of those under the age of 18 and none of those 65 or over.

Ancestries: English (28.8%), Danish (16.3%), German (16.3%), Scottish (10.9%), Norwegian (7.4%), Welsh (5.1%).

== See also ==
- List of cities and towns in Utah
