= Utah State Route 131 (1933–2001) =

Former state highway in Davis County, Utah, United States

State Route 131
- 400 North

Route information
- Maintained by UDOT
- Length: 0.796 mi (Note: The mileage given for the former SR-131 is derived from the mileage provided by UDOT for the current SR-106, which exactly replaced the former SR-131.) (1,281 m)
- Existed: 1933–2001
- History: Substantially truncated in 1961 and 1969; entirely re-designated as part of SR-106

Major junctions
- West end: 400 North in West Bountiful
- I-15 in West Bountiful; US 89 on West Bountiful–Bountiful line
- East end: SR-106 in Bountiful

Location
- Country: United States
- State: Utah
- Counties: Davis

Highway system
- Utah State Highway System; Interstate; US; State; Minor; Scenic
← SR-130	→ SR-132

State Route 131 (SR-131), was a state highway in southern Davis County, Utah, United States from 1933 to 2001. Just prior to being deleted, the route spanned east–west for 0.796 miles (1.281 km) and connected Interstate 15 with SR-106.

== Route description ==
Although the former SR-131 was subject to several adjustments to its route during its existence, just prior to being deleted from the state highway system in 2001, the former SR-131 began at a point in West Bountiful defined as 0.21 miles (0.34 km) west of I-15 on West 400 North (also described as a point just west of railroad structure via 400 North). From its western terminus it headed east on 400 North as a two-lane road to pass over the Union Pacific railway tracks before it reached a partial diamond interchange with I-15 (exit 317); the partial interchange only allows access to and from the south.

The route continued east from I-15 on 400 North as a four-lane undivided road to a junction with U.S. Route 89 (US-89, North 500 West). As it crossed US-89 it left West Bountiful and entered Bountiful. Continuing east in Bountiful the route had several side streets before it reached its western terminus at a junction with SR-106 at 200 West.

== History ==
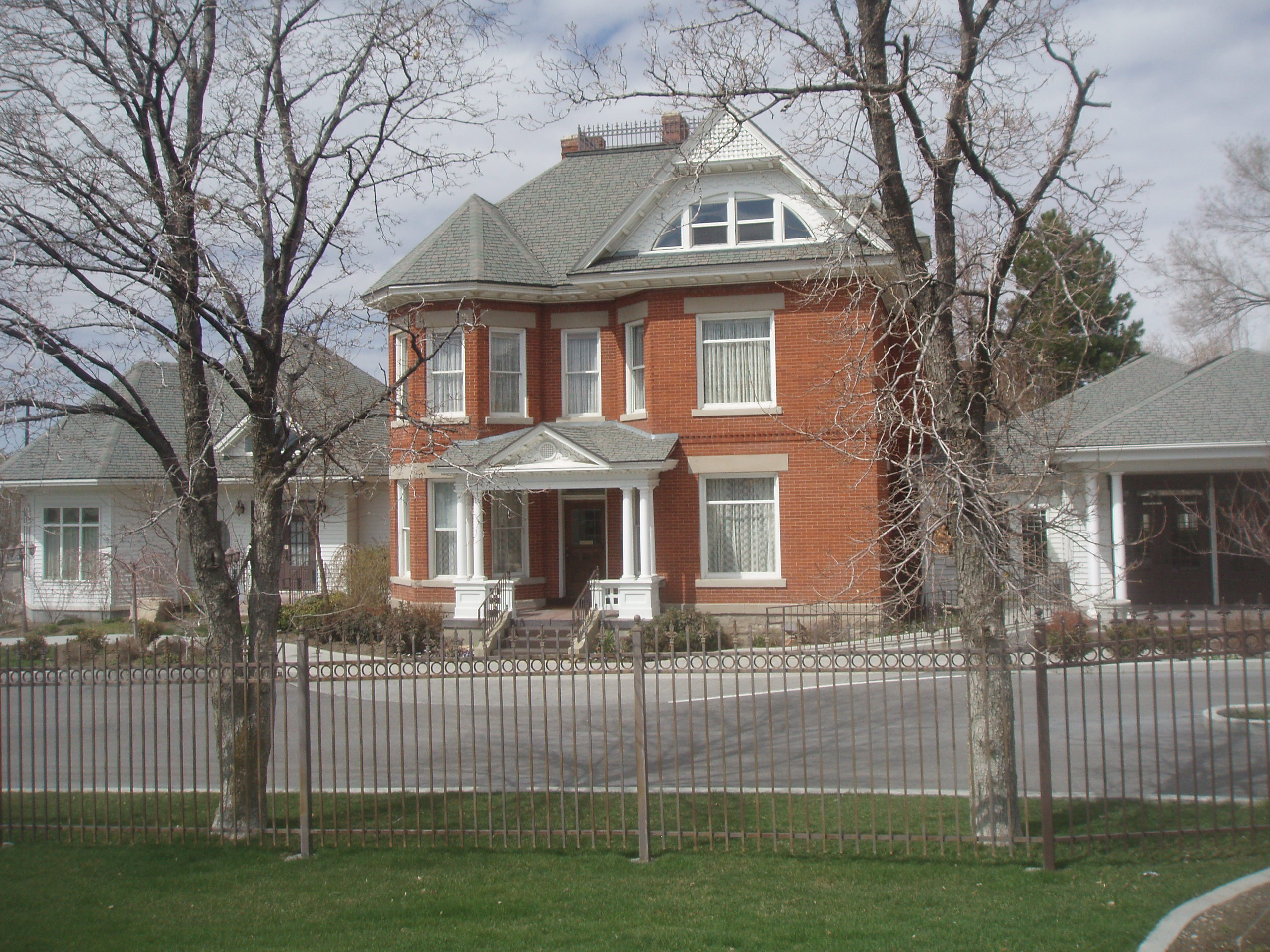
The Eldredge Manor, a historical residence along the former SR-131 (currently SR-106) in West Bountiful April 2010

SR-131 was created in 1933 as an approximately 3.25-mile (5.23 km) north–south western loop off what was then SR-1 (US-91) through communities that later incorporated as North Salt Lake, Woods Cross, and West Bountiful. The original route began on the current border line between North Salt Lake and Bountiful at the intersection of what is now South Main Street (US-89) and 400 East/800 West (at approximately 3125 South). From the original southern terminus the route headed north on 400 East/800 West through the current cities of North Salt Lake, Woods Cross, and into West Bountiful to 400 North. It then headed east on 400 North to SR-1 (US-91, 500 West) in Bountiful.

Nearly 30 years later, in 1961, the routing of the section of SR-1 (US-91) that connected at both ends of SR-131 was adjusted, and the SR-1 designation was applied to the new section of I-15. At the same time, the alignment of SR-106 through Bountiful between 400 North and 2200 South was moved west from Main Street to 200 West. As part of this overall change, the northern terminus of former SR-131 was extended east to 200 West to connect with the new routing of SR-106.

In 1969, the southernmost 0.5 miles (0.80 km) section of SR-131 from South Main Street (SR-106) to 2600 South was re-designated as part of SR-93. At the same time the approximately 2.5-mile (4.0 km) section that ran north of 2600 South to West 400 North and then east on 400 North to I-15 (SR-1) was deleted from the state highway system.

After the change in 1969, the surviving section of the former SR-131 (400 North, between I-15 and 200 West) remained essentially unchanged for almost another 30 years. In 1997, the western terminus was extended 0.21 miles (0.34 km) farther west along 400 North to ensure that the Utah Department of Transportation (UDOT) had the responsibility of maintaining the "structure across the railroad that was built as part of I-15".

In 2001, the routing of SR-106 was again changed such that what remained of SR-131 was re-designated as part of SR-106, and SR-131 was deleted from the state highway system.

== Major intersections ==
The entire route was in Davis County.

Location	mi	km	Destinations	Notes
West Bountiful	0.00	0.00	400 North	Continuation beyond western terminus
West Bountiful	0.219– 0.346	0.352– 0.557	I-15 south (Veterans Memorial Highway) – Salt Lake City	Incomplete diamond interchange connecting to and from the south only; exit 317
West Bountiful–Bountiful line	0.445	0.716	US 89 (500 West)	Former eastern terminus of SR-131
Bountiful	0.796	1.281	SR-106 (200 West)	Eastern terminus; roadway continued as SR-106
1.000 mi = 1.609 km; 1.000 km = 0.621 mi: Incomplete access
