= Utah State Route 270 =

State highway in Utah, United States

State Route 270
- West Temple

Route information
- Maintained by UDOT
- Length: 0.749 mi (1,205 m)
- Existed: 1960–present

Major junctions
- South end: I-15 / I-80 in Salt Lake City
- SR-269 in Salt Lake City
- North end: US 89 in Salt Lake City

Location
- Country: United States
- State: Utah

Highway system
- Utah State Highway System; Interstate; US; State; Minor; Scenic
← SR-269	→ SR-271

State Route 270 is a short north–south thoroughfare that sits completely within Salt Lake City in Salt Lake County, entirely along South West Temple Street. The southern terminus is at West 900 South, with ramps to and from I-15/I-80 at exit 305D; its northern terminus is at US-89 (West 400 South, formerly SR-186).

== Route description ==
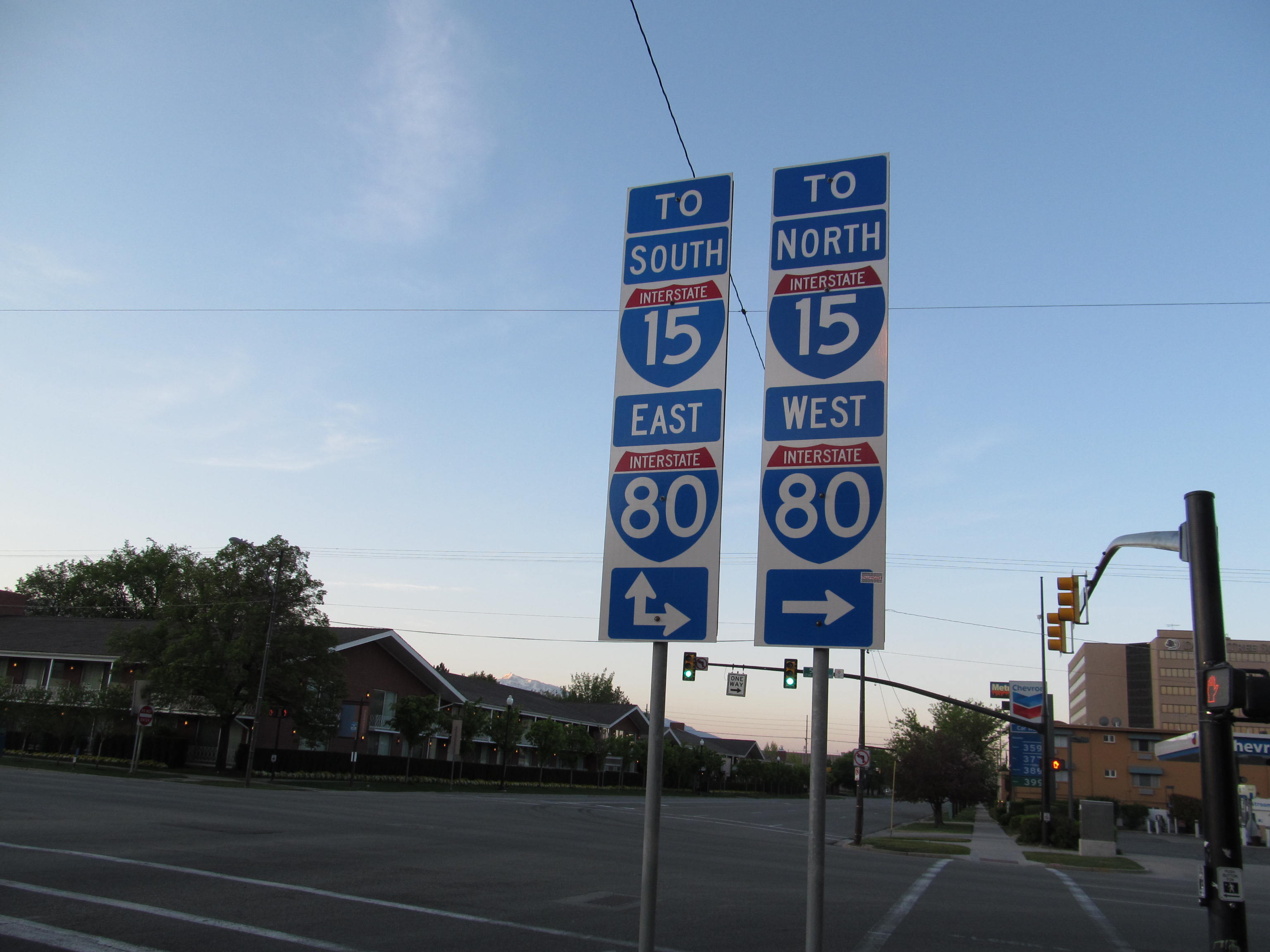
SR-270 southbound at its junction with SR-269 westbound

After its southern terminus, SR-270 heads north for its entire course, having a dual intersection with SR-269, one eastbound and one westbound. Afterwards it terminates at US-89.

== History ==
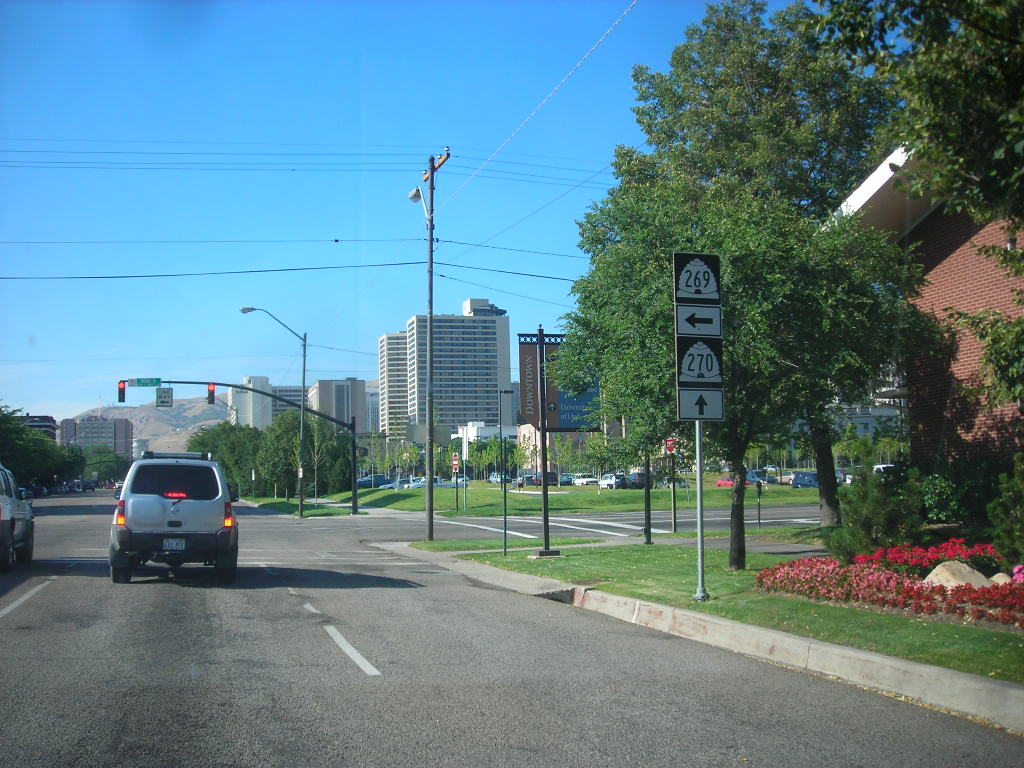
SR-270 northbound at its junction with SR-269 westbound

The State Road Commission (now known as the Utah Department of Transportation) designated SR-270 in 1960 as a branch from proposed I-15 to former SR-176 (West 900 South) at South West Temple Street. In 1969, the state legislature extended it north to SR-186 (West 400 South, now US-89).

== Major intersections ==
The entire route is in Salt Lake City, Salt Lake County.

mi	km	Destinations	Notes
0.000	0.000	I-15 south / I-80 east – Provo, Cheyenne	Interchange
0.000	0.000	West Temple Street south	Interchange; no southbound entrance
0.006	0.0097	900 South	Former SR-176
0.457	0.735	SR-269 east (600 South)	One-way eastbound only
0.607	0.977	SR-269 west (500 South) to I-15 south / I-80 west	One-way westbound only
0.749	1.205	US 89 (400 South)	Formerly SR-186
1.000 mi = 1.609 km; 1.000 km = 0.621 mi
