= Browse, Utah =

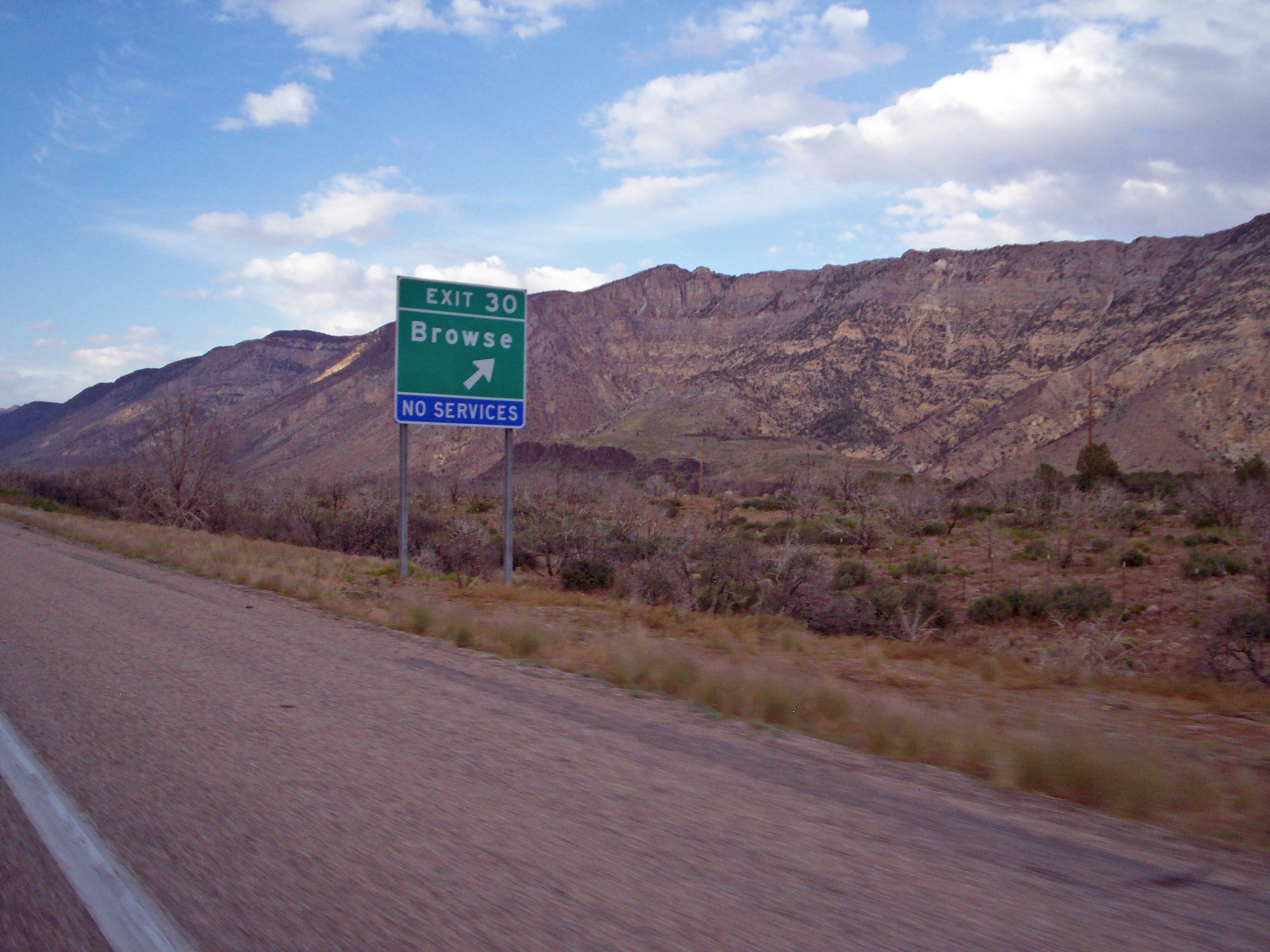
Sign for the exit to Browse, Utah, off Interstate 15.

Browse is an unincorporated area of Washington County in southwestern Utah near Interstate 15. Browse is in a transitional climate zone as it is located between St. George, Utah at about 2800 feet above sea level in the Mojave Desert and Cedar City, Utah in the Great Basin at nearly 5900 feet. The Hurricane Cliffs, part of the Colorado Plateau, are directly to the east. This area contains species of desert plants and animals in one location that otherwise would be unique to each of the three above-mentioned desert regions.

There are no services in Browse. The area is used by ranchers to graze cattle. Hikers, campers, mountain bikers, and wilderness enthusiasts visit due to its close proximity to Interstate 15.

Currently the United States Bureau of Land Management is attempting to allow natural plants and animals to return after a large wildfire burned much of the area in 2003.

Browse is located at 37°14′22″N 113°21′39″W.
