= Pintura, Utah =

Unincorporated community in the state of Utah, United States

Pintura
- Unincorporated community
- Location within Utah Location within the United States
- Coordinates: 37°20′27″N 113°16′27″W
- Country: United States
- State: Utah
- County: Washington
- Founded: 1858
- Elevation: 4,088 ft (1,246 m)
- Time zone: UTC-7 (Mountain (MST))
  - Summer (DST): UTC-6 (MDT)
- ZIP code: 84720
- Area code: 435
- GNIS feature ID: 1444434

Pintura is an unincorporated community in northern Washington County, Utah, United States. Its peak population in the late 1800s was 150, and the community was named Bellevue until 1925.
