= Manderfield, Utah =

Unincorporated community in the state of Utah, United States

Coordinates: 38°21′34″N 112°38′20″W

Manderfield is an unincorporated community located in Beaver County, Utah, United States. Its elevation is 6,148 feet (1,874 m).
