= Legacy Highway =

Legacy Highway

Route information
- Maintained by Utah Department of Transportation
- Existed: 2008–present
- Component highways: State Route 85, Interstate 80, Interstate 215, State Route 67, and State Route 177

Location
- Country: United States
- State: Utah
- Counties: Juab, Utah, Salt Lake, Davis, Weber, Box Elder

Highway system
- Utah State Routes

The Legacy Highway is a proposed and partially completed freeway in northern Utah, United States, that is planned to eventually connect eastern Juab County (on the south) with eastern Box Elder County (on the north), running along the west sides of Utah, Salt Lake, Davis, and Weber counties in between. Its purpose is to provide an alternate north–south transportation corridor to Interstate 15. It was proposed in 1996, but due to lawsuits over issues with the completeness of the environmental impact statement construction was delayed. Construction of one segment began in 2006. That segment, known as the Legacy Parkway, opened on 13 September 2008.

== Concept ==
The highway was proposed in 1996 by then-Utah Governor Michael O. Leavitt. Because of delays and the length of the freeway, it may be 2025 or later until construction on the entire portion is finished, although officials have stated that the complete proposal may, in fact, never be finished.

== Components ==
=== Legacy South ===
From its inception the concept of the Legacy Highway has always included the idea of extending it south through the west side of Utah County to the Nephi area in Juab County. However, there are no proposals for routes south of the southern terminus of the Mountain View Corridor section at SR-73, except that it would have to follow a route somewhere west of Utah Lake.

=== Mountain View Corridor ===
Another portion of the Legacy Highway is the Mountain View Corridor, which is planned to span the entire length of western Salt Lake County and a few miles south into northwestern Utah County. Construction on this corridor began in 2010. As of June 2013, the frontage road portions of this section have been completed from Porter Rockwell Boulevard (at about 10600 South) north to 5400 South (SR-173) and from Redwood Road (SR-68) to I-15 in northern Lehi. The Mountain View Corridor section of the Legacy Highway is numerically designated as State Route 85.

Early on the Utah Legislature considered making this portion of the Legacy Highway a toll road so that it could be funded for construction sooner. However, while suggested as a possibility, the toll road concept was never adopted.

=== Legacy Parkway ===
The first portion built was the Legacy Parkway, or South Davis Segment, which runs from Farmington to North Salt Lake. Construction on the Legacy Parkway began in 2004 after many delays. The interchange with Interstate 15 and US-89 was mostly completed before the highway was delayed again as a result of lawsuits over the completeness of the environmental impact statement. Construction began again in 2006 and was completed in September 2008. The Legacy Parkway section of the Legacy Highway is numerically designated as State Route 67.

=== Legacy North ===
Legacy North is planned to run north from US-89/I-15 in Farmington through the west side of northern Davis County and continue north through the west side of Weber County. The Utah Department of Transportation is working on the optimal route for this section of the Legacy Highway. UDOT has opted to refer the southern portion of this section as the West Davis Corridor. In 2013, UDOT accepted hundreds of proposals from community members on the proposed routing of the freeway, and has stated that they will consider all options, including not building the freeway at all, a stance which is supported by some community and environmental groups who argue that it will destroy sensitive wetlands and prime farmland. The proposed routing is expected to cost $587 million, although funding has not yet been secured. The first portion of the route is not expected to be built until around 2020.

== See also ==
- Legacy Highway (disambiguation)
