= Utah State Route 145 =

State highway in Utah, United States

State Route 145
- Pioneer Crossing; American Fork Main Street
- SR-145 highlighted in red

Route information
- Maintained by UDOT
- Length: 6.862 mi (11.043 km)
- Existed: 1978–present

Major junctions
- West end: SR-73 in Saratoga Springs
- SR-68 in Saratoga Springs; I-15 in American Fork
- East end: US 89 in American Fork

Location
- Country: United States
- State: Utah

Highway system
- Utah State Highway System; Interstate; US; State; Minor; Scenic
← SR-144	→ SR-147

State Route 145 (SR-145), a majority of which is also known as Pioneer Crossing, is a 6.862-mile-long (11.043 km) west–east thoroughfare completely within Utah County in northern Utah that cuts through Saratoga Springs, Lehi, American Fork, and portions of unincorporated Utah County. The portion between Interstate 15 (I-15) and U.S. Route 89 (US-89) has been under state jurisdiction since 1978, while the roadway between SR-68 and I-15 (the section named Pioneer Crossing) opened in 2010. The road (and Pioneer Crossing name) were extended from SR-68 to SR-73 in 2014. The road runs mostly parallel to and south of SR-73, which also connects to SR-68 and I-15. The original portion of the route between I-15 (including the interchange) and US-89 is designated as Main Street in American Fork's street grid.

== Route description ==
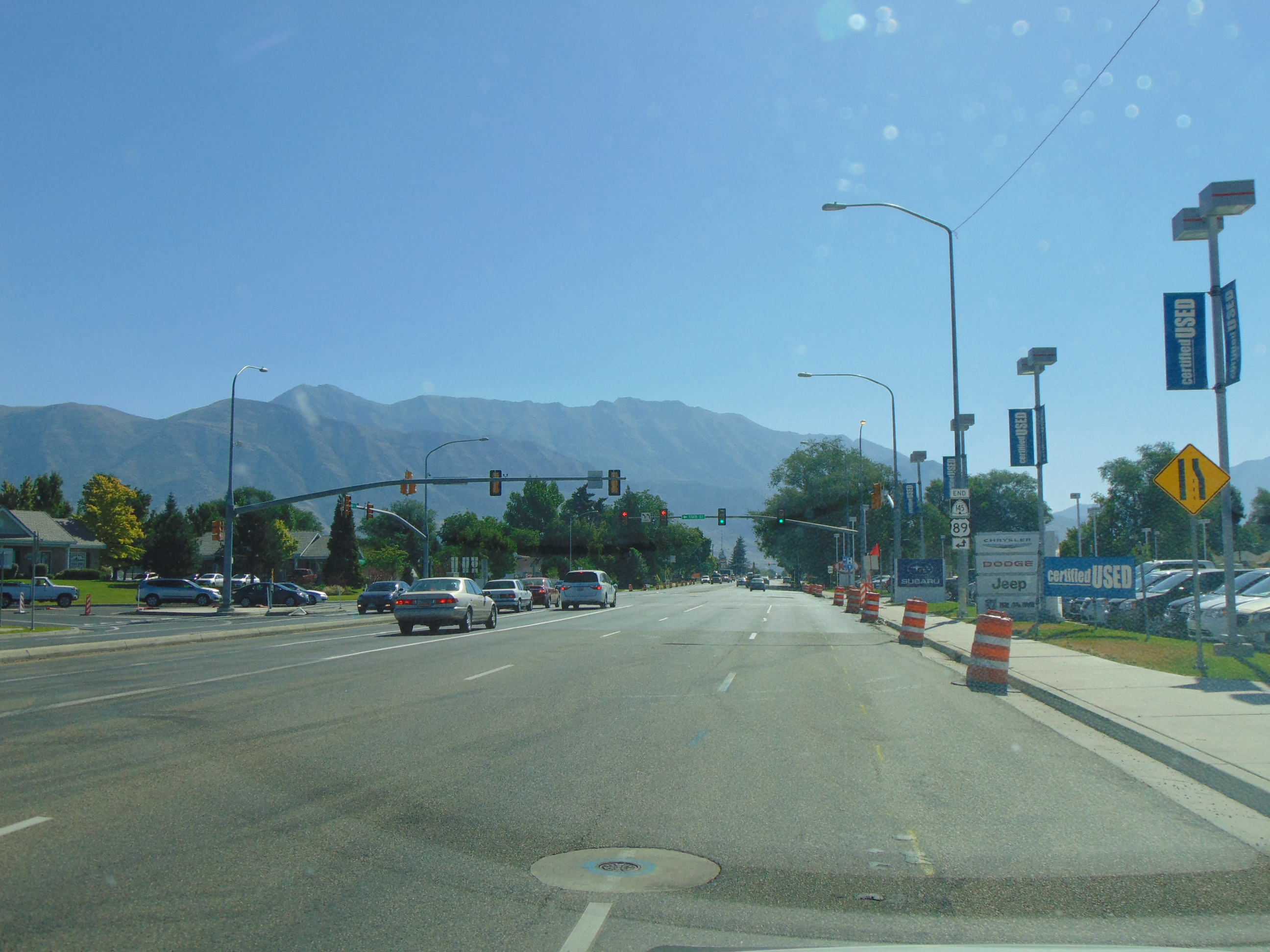
Eastern terminus in American Fork

Commencing from the route's western terminus in northern Saratoga Springs, SR-145 heads southeast as Pioneer Crossing with two lanes in each direction, divided by a center turn lane. The road turns east just prior to the intersection with SR-68, then crosses over the Jordan River. The route then takes a brief northeasterly turn before returning due east, and passing through a rural area of western Utah County before entering a stretch of development past 2300 West. The highway turns southeast to avoid development before again turning northeast and east. The road gains a third lane in each direction past 300 East (on Lehi's grid) then becomes American Fork Main Street just prior to where it meets I-15 at a diverging diamond interchange (DDI). The road continues east for about a half-mile and ends at an intersection with State Street (US-89).

The entire route is included in the National Highway System.

== History ==
State maintenance of Main Street in American Fork (from I-15 to US-89) was established in May 1978, the state legislature approving that the following year. By 2003, a concept of a connector between Redwood Road (SR-68) and I-15 was presented in an environmental impact study for the Mountain View Corridor. After a separate study was completed in 2008, plans to construct the connector were set in place. As part of a project to reconstruct over twenty miles of I-15 through Utah County, the present interchange at Main Street was set to be rebuilt as a diverging diamond interchange (DDI). Construction began in early 2009, with the road opening to traffic between US-89 and SR-68 on August 23, 2010. The DDI was the second to be opened in the United States, the first being in Missouri. In June 2014, construction began to extend Pioneer Crossing northwest of SR-68 to SR-73. The extension was completed on November 26, 2014.

== Major intersections ==
The entire route is in Utah County.

Location	mi	km	Destinations	Notes
Saratoga Springs	0.000	0.000	SR-73 (Cory B. Wride Memorial Highway)	Western terminus
Saratoga Springs	1.136	1.828	SR-68 (Redwood Road)	Continuous-flow intersection
American Fork	6.278	10.103	I-15 – Provo, Salt Lake City	Diverging diamond interchange
American Fork	6.862	11.043	US 89 (State Street)	Eastern terminus
1.000 mi = 1.609 km; 1.000 km = 0.621 mi
