= Utah State Route 172 =

State highway in Utah, United States

State Route 172
- 5600 West
- SR-172 highlighted in red

Route information
- Maintained by UDOT
- Length: 9.218 mi (14.835 km)
- Existed: 1985–present

Major junctions
- South end: 6200 South in Kearns
- SR-171 in West Valley City; SR-201 in West Valley City
- North end: I-80 in Salt Lake City

Location
- Country: United States
- State: Utah

Highway system
- Utah State Highway System; Interstate; US; State; Minor; Scenic
← SR-171	→ SR-173

State Route 172 (SR-172) is a state highway in the U.S. state of Utah connecting 6200 South and West Valley City to SR-201 and I-80 via 5600 West in a span of 9.22 miles (14.84 km). The highway was formed in 1985.

== Route description ==
The route begins at the junction of 6200 South and 5600 West and heads due north on the latter as a two-lane undivided highway, with wide shoulders on each side. Past the intersection of SR-173, the road widens to four lanes. Past the diamond interchange at SR-201, the route loses two lanes in each direction. The highway continues in this manner until it terminates at the diamond interchange at I-80.

All of SR-172 has been included in the National Highway System.

== History ==
State Route 172 was formed in 1985 by the Utah Transportation Commission. Since the route's formation, it has not been changed.

== Major intersections ==
The entire route is in Salt Lake County.

Location	mi	km	Destinations	Notes
Kearns	0.000	0.000	6200 South	Southern terminus
West Valley City	0.993	1.598	SR-173 (5400 South)	
West Valley City	3.993	6.426	SR-171 (3500 South)	
Salt Lake City	5.933– 6.086	9.548– 9.794	SR-201 – Magna, Salt Lake City	
Salt Lake City	9.005– 9.218	14.492– 14.835	I-80 – Wendover, Salt Lake City	Northern terminus
1.000 mi = 1.609 km; 1.000 km = 0.621 mi
