= Utah State Route 151 =

State highway in Utah, United States

State Route 151
- South Jordan Parkway
- SR-151 highlighted in red

Route information
- Maintained by UDOT
- Length: 4.235 mi (6.816 km)
- Existed: 1987–present

Major junctions
- West end: SR-154 in South Jordan
- SR-68 in South Jordan
- East end: I-15 in Sandy

Location
- Country: United States
- State: Utah

Highway system
- Utah State Highway System; Interstate; US; State; Minor; Scenic
← SR-150	→ SR-152

State Route 151 (SR-151), sometimes known as the South Jordan Parkway, is a state highway in the U.S. state of Utah connecting SR-154 (Bangerter Highway) in South Jordan to Interstate 15 (I-15) in Sandy. The route spans 4.24 miles (6.82 km) in southern Salt Lake County.

== Route description ==
The highway begins at the intersection of SR-154 (Bangerter Highway) and West 10400 South in South Jordan. Heading east on the latter, a four-lane road, the road shifts slightly to the north immediately past the intersection. At South 3200 West the road loses one lane in each direction. The route continues east and intersects with several local roads before reaching SR-68 (Redwood Road), where the route widens to four lanes again. Past South 1300 West, the highway begins to dip southeast and gains a fixed center median. After passing Mulligan's South golf course and crossing the Jordan River and Jordan River Parkway trail, it straightens out to the east and becomes West 10600 South while entering Sandy. Right before reaching I-15, the road passes under Union Pacific and UTA's FrontRunner railroad bridges. The highway crosses over I-15 and terminates at a single-point urban interchange serving the freeway at exit 293.

=== South Jordan Parkway ===
While SR-151 only extends as far west as the Bangerter Highway (SR-154), the South Jordan Parkway continues further west (with multiple curves and several roundabouts along the way) to about 5400 West. At that point it currently ends at the intersection with Cardinal Park Road (which is the access road for Utah Transit Authority's South Jordan Parkway TRAX station). However, there are plans to extend the parkway further south west to connect with the Mountain View Corridor (SR-85).

== History ==
State Route 151 was formed in 1987 as a link between SR-68 and I-15. The state would build a road in between South 1300 West and South 1000 West that would connect West 10400 South and West 10600 South. In 1992, Sandy requested the state to assume jurisdiction of West 10600 South from I-15 eastward to SR-71. The Utah Department of Transportation approved the measure assuming all conditions were met; however, this eastward extension never occurred. In 2001, another stretch of proposed roadway was added to the state highway system, from SR-68 (Redwood Road) west to SR-154 (Bangerter Highway).

The Route is included in American Truck Simulator's Utah DLC.

== Major intersections ==
The entire route is in Salt Lake County.

Location	mi	km	Destinations	Notes
South Jordan	0.000	0.000	SR-154 (Bangerter Highway)	Western terminus
South Jordan	2.008	3.232	SR-68 (Redwood Road)	
Sandy	4.207– 4.235	6.771– 6.816	I-15 – Salt Lake City, Provo	Eastern terminus, road continues east as 10600 South
1.000 mi = 1.609 km; 1.000 km = 0.621 mi

== See also ==
- U.S. Route 89 in Utah
