= Utah State Route 175 =

State highway in Utah, United States

State Route 175
- 11400 South
- SR-175 highlighted in red

Route information
- Maintained by UDOT
- Length: 4.860 mi (7.821 km)
- Existed: 2008–present

Major junctions
- West end: SR-154 in South Jordan
- SR-68 in South Jordan; I-15 on the Sandy/Draper border
- East end: US 89 on Sandy/Draper border

Location
- Country: United States
- State: Utah

Highway system
- Utah State Highway System; Interstate; US; State; Minor; Scenic
← SR-174	→ SR-176

State Route 175 (SR-175) is a state highway in the U.S. state of Utah. Also known as 11400 South, it spans 4.8 miles (7.7 km) in southern Salt Lake County, connecting two major north-south transportation corridors in the area: the Bangerter Highway (SR-154) to the west in South Jordan, and Interstate 15 and State Street to the east.

== Route description ==
State Route 175 begins in the city of South Jordan classified as a minor arterial road, providing access to the Daybreak Community and the Oquirrh Mountain Utah Temple from the Bangerter Highway. From here, it travels east, crossing SR-68 (Redwood Road) and the Jordan River. After crossing the river, it leaves South Jordan and continues east along the border between Sandy to the north and Draper to the south, travelling under Interstate 15 via a diamond interchange and ending less than 0.1 miles (0.16 km) later at US-89 (State Street).

== History ==
The combination of the construction of the Daybreak Community and Oquirrh Mountain Utah Temple near the west end of 11400 South, the Interstate 15 interchange at 11400 South, and the "underdeveloped State Highway System for the east west corridors in the south end of the Salt Lake Valley", led the Utah Department of Transportation to designate 11400 South as a Utah State Route 175 in 2008.

== Major intersections ==
The entire route is in Salt Lake County.

Location	mi	km	Destinations	Notes
South Jordan	0.000	0.000	SR-154 (Bangerter Highway)	Western terminus
South Jordan	2.367	3.809	SR-68 (Redwood Road)	
South Jordan	3.482– 3.569	5.604– 5.744	Bridge over Jordan River	
Sandy–Draper line	4.637	7.463	I-15 north – Salt Lake City	
Sandy–Draper line	4.697	7.559	I-15 south – Las Vegas	
Sandy–Draper line	4.860	7.821	US 89 (State Street)	Eastern terminus
1.000 mi = 1.609 km; 1.000 km = 0.621 mi
