= Utah State Route 68 =

State highway in Utah, Salt Lake, and Davis counties in Utah, United States

State Route 68

Route information
- Maintained by UDOT
- Length: 70.623 mi (113.657 km)
- Existed: 1931–present

Major junctions
- South end: US 6 near Elberta
- SR-85 in Saratoga Springs; SR-154 in Bluffdale; I-215 in Taylorsville; SR-201 in Salt Lake City and West Valley City; I-80 in Salt Lake City; I-215 in North Salt Lake; I-15 in Bountiful
- North end: US 89 in Woods Cross

Location
- Country: United States
- State: Utah
- Counties: Utah, Salt Lake, Davis

Highway system
- Utah State Highway System; Interstate; US; State; Minor; Scenic
← SR-67	→ I-70

State Route 68 (SR-68) is a state highway in the U.S. state of Utah. It is a major thoroughfare throughout the Wasatch Front as it runs north–south for 70.8 miles (113.9 km), linking US-6 near Elberta to US-89 in Woods Cross. The route intersects several major freeways and highways in the Salt Lake City metropolitan area including I-215, I-80, and I-15. The route is more commonly referred to as Redwood Road, after the street it is routed along throughout Salt Lake County. The highway is also routed for a short distance along 500 South and 200 West in Bountiful and Camp Williams Road in Utah County. The route is a surface street for its entire length.

SR-68 became a state highway in 1931, at which time the route ran from then–US-40 (North Temple Street) in Salt Lake City to present-day US-89 in Lehi. In 1933, the route was extended north to US-89 at Beck's Hot Springs. SR-68 was routed onto Redwood Road in 1943, taking over what had been designated SR-153. In 1960, SR-68 switched alignments with SR-249 to follow Redwood Road and 2300 North to Bountiful; the route was extended south to Elberta at this time also. SR-249 was extended west along a proposed roadway to 2200 West and 2200 North in 1961 before being removed in 1969. In 2001, SR-68 was extended south on a former piece of SR-106 in Bountiful.

== Route description ==
On average, the most driven-on portion of SR-68 is between I-215 and 5400 South, with 66,635 cars-per-day traveling between these two points in 2007. The lowest traffic is recorded at the beginning point of the route through Elberta, with an average of 1,120 cars per day. Traffic along SR-68 in Elberta has increased 135 percent, and the segment between I-215 and 5400 West has increased 13 percent since 1998.

=== Utah County ===
A four-way intersection in Elberta with US-6 marks the southern terminus of the route as it starts north on a two-lane undivided highway. The highway exits Elberta and continues north along the sparsely populated portion of western Utah County. The southwestern shore of Utah Lake appears as the road briefly turns northeast. The route passes the failed planned community of Mosida before turning north again. Once more turning northeast, the highway approaches the western shore of the lake and runs parallel to it before once more turning north. After turning northwest, the highway enters Saratoga Springs. The route turns north near Utah Lake's northern shore, widening to two lanes each direction at the intersection with 400 South. For the rest of the way north of this point, SR-68 is part of the National Highway System. The route then intersects Pony Express Parkway, which connects to Eagle Mountain, then the route continues north to intersections with Pioneer Crossing and SR-73. Past the SR-73 intersection, the route turns northwest and intersects the east spur of the Mountain View Corridor (SR-85), then passes slightly east of Camp Williams.

=== Salt Lake County ===
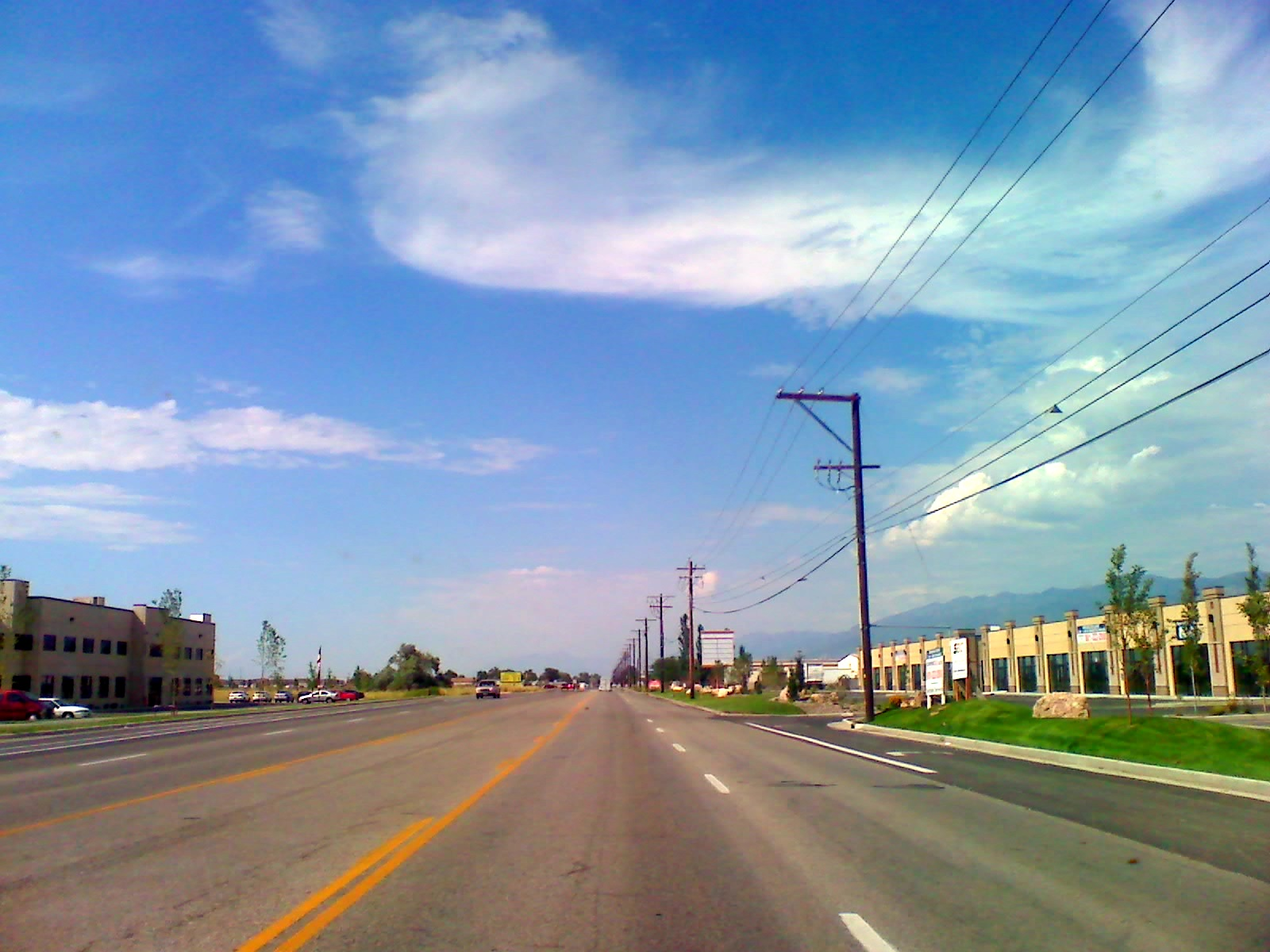
SR-68 in North Salt Lake

The highway then enters Salt Lake County and the Salt Lake City metropolitan area. SR-68 is one of two roads that connect Utah and Salt Lake Counties through a bottleneck in the Wasatch Front called Point of the Mountain, referring to the Traverse Mountains. The low-lying area through this neck is occupied by the former Denver and Rio Grande Western Railroad. SR-68 is routed on the western slope of the canyon, The other highway, I-15/US-89, is routed higher up Point of the Mountain. As the route enters Bluffdale on Redwood Road, it turns northeast and intersects with Mountain View Corridor again, then with SR-140; the Utah State Prison is located on this road east of the junction. SR-68 then turns north before crossing SR-154, commonly known as the Bangerter Highway. Soon reverting to two lanes, the route exits Bluffdale and enters Riverton, gaining two lanes in each direction as it passes SR-71. Continuing north, it enters South Jordan. It intersects with SR-175, SR-151, and SR-209, gaining one more lane in each direction beyond the latter intersection, and enters West Jordan and central Salt Lake County.

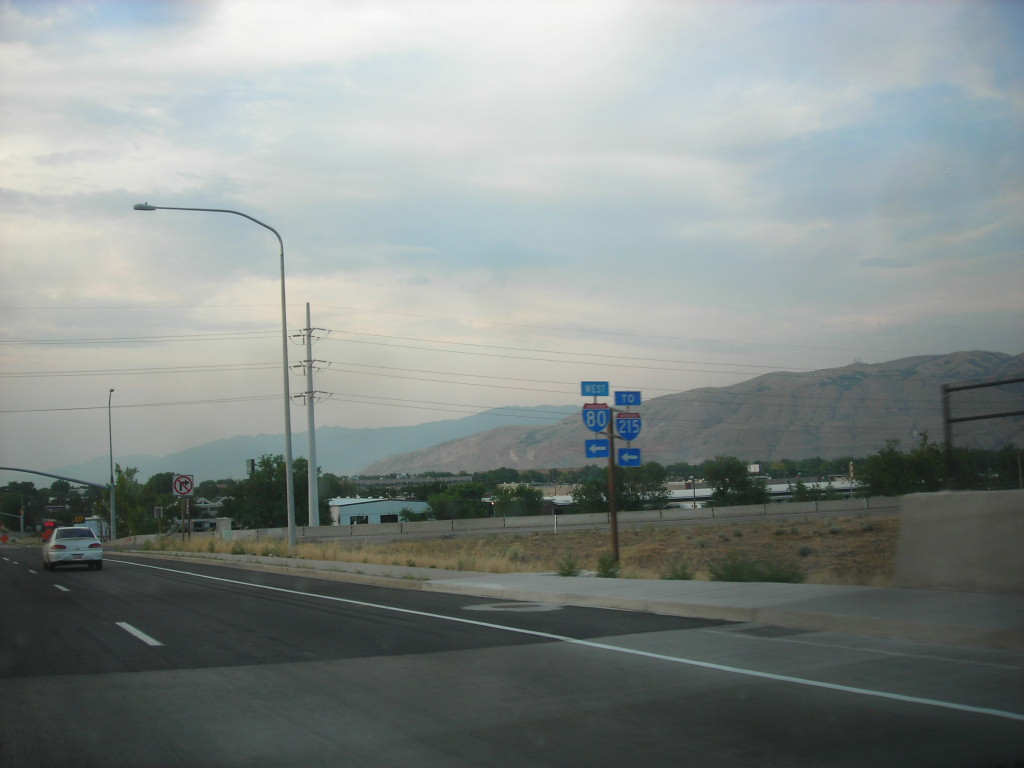
SR-68 at its junction with I-80

Soon reaching Taylorsville, the highway intersects I-215. Shortly thereafter, the road passes Salt Lake Community College and enters West Valley City. It soon reaches a single-point urban interchange at SR-201 that lies on the border of West Valley City and Salt Lake City. The highway loses one lane in each direction past the frontage road of SR-201. This section of route, from 2100 South to 1700 North, is known as the Pete Suazo Memorial Highway. West of Salt Lake City, the highway passes over the surplus canal of the Jordan River as it goes through the neighborhoods of Glendale and Poplar Grove. It arrives at an interchange with I-80 east of Salt Lake City International Airport. The road loses one lane northbound beyond 1000 North as it proceeds through the neighborhood of Rose Park in the northwestern portion of the city; the second southbound lane is lost north of 1300 North. The highway crosses the Jordan River before exiting the county.

=== Davis County ===
Entering Davis County and North Salt Lake, SR-68 reaches a second interchange with I-215 at its Exit 27. Originally a diamond interchange, this has been reconfigured to a diverging diamond interchange. The road briefly turns northeast before drifting north again and gaining one lane in each direction. Before passing Skypark Airport, the highway loses one lane in each direction. Redwood Road turns east onto 500 South and enters Bountiful. Past an interchange at I-15, the route gains one passing lane and turns south onto 200 West, a two-lane undivided road. The highway turns southwest and defaults onto southbound US-89 within the city of Woods Cross.

== History ==
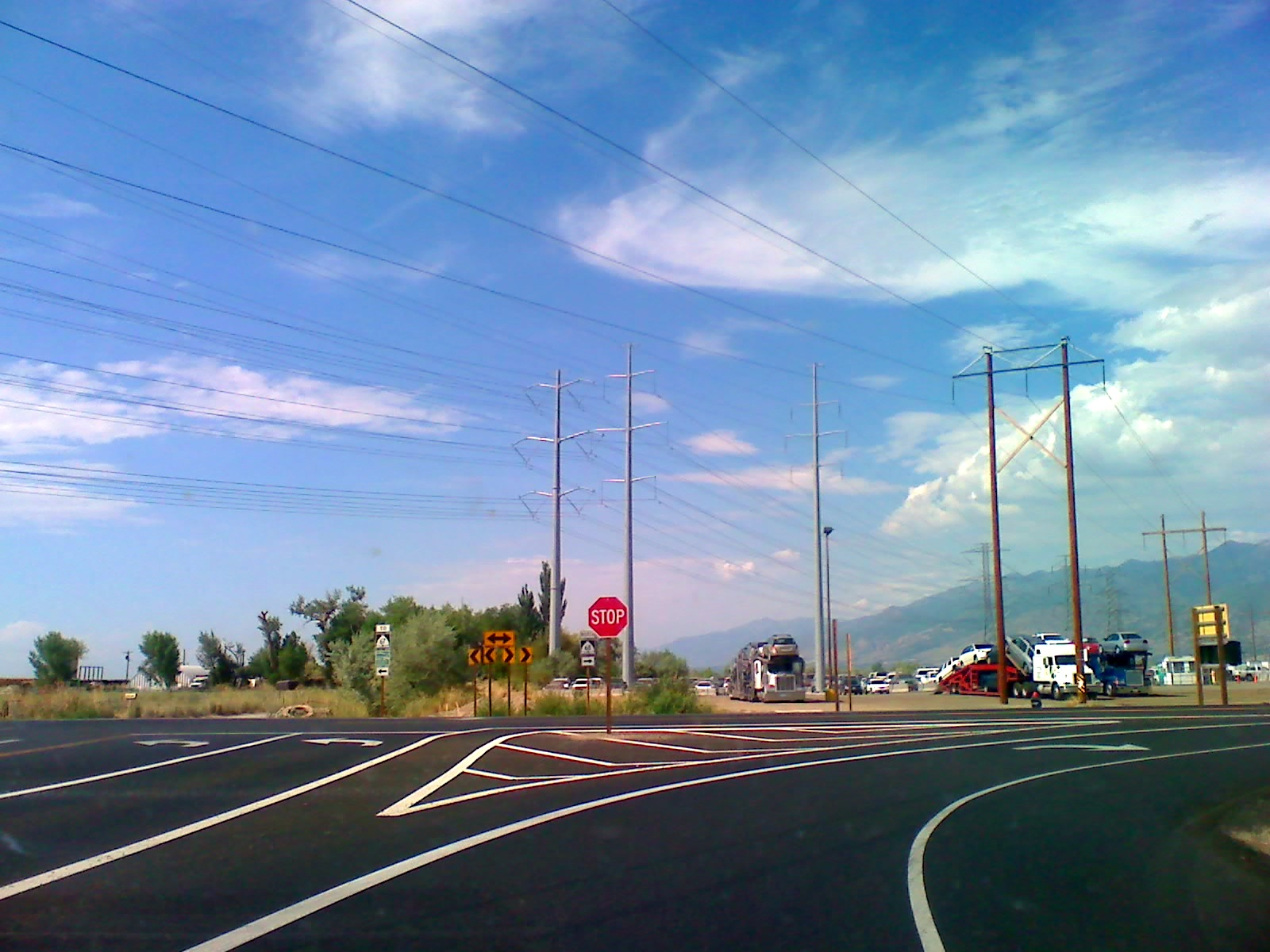
SR-68 turns from Redwood Road east onto 500 South; Legacy Parkway is to the west

In 1931, the state legislature added State Route 68 to the state highway system. It followed Redwood Road from US-40 (North Temple Street) south to the present SR-73 and then used SR-73 east to US-50/US-89/US-91 (now solely US-89) in Lehi. The state added 900 West and Warm Springs Road from US-40 north to US-89/US-91 at Becks as SR-153 in 1933. Becks is the name of a rail siding, 4 miles (6 km) north of downtown Salt Lake, that briefly served as the terminus of a commuter rail line to Beck's Hot Springs. In 1943 SR-153 was moved west to Redwood Road, returning to Becks via 2300 North. This brought the north end of SR-68 and the south end of SR-153 together, and two years later SR-68 was extended north to absorb SR-153. In 1953, Redwood Road north of 2300 North became SR-249, which turned east at 500 South in Davis County to end at US-89/US-91 (500 West) in Bountiful.

To provide for route continuity on a truck bypass route of Salt Lake City, SR-68 and SR-249 were swapped in 1960, bringing the north end of SR-68 to Bountiful and making SR-249 a short connection on 2300 North. At the same time, SR-68 was extended south from the intersection with SR-73 around the west side of Utah Lake to US-6 at Elberta, with the portion east to Lehi becoming an extension of SR-73. SR-249 was extended west along a proposed roadway to 2200 West and 2200 North in 1961, "in order to provide an adequate road from the north to the Salt Lake City municipal airport", but in 1969 the entire route was removed from the state highway system. SR-68 was extended slightly east at its north end, from 500 West (US-89) to 200 West (SR-106), in 1975, and, in 2001, with the removal of SR-106 through downtown Bountiful from the state highway system, SR-68 was extended south along 200 West, formerly SR-106, to Parkin Junction on US-89.

When the highway was established in 1931, it ran from Lehi to Salt Lake City. The state subsequently extended it south into Elberta and north into Bountiful. The road was routed along its current alignment of Redwood Road in 1943. The road has been moved and extended multiple times, with the most recent change being in 2001 when SR-106 was deleted from the state highway system.

== Major intersections ==
County	Location	mi	km	Destinations	Notes
Utah	Elberta	0.000	0.000	US 6 – Eureka, Goshen, Santaquin, Delta	Southern terminus, road continues south as 12800 West
Utah	Saratoga Springs	31.719	51.047	SR-145 (Pioneer Crossing) – Eagle Mountain, Lehi	Continuous-flow intersection
Utah	Saratoga Springs	32.726	52.667	Crossroads Boulevard	Former SR-73
Utah	Lehi	34.494– 34.553	55.513– 55.608	SR-194 (2100 North)	
Salt Lake	Bluffdale	38.107	61.327	SR-131 (Porter Rockwell Boulevard)	
Salt Lake	Bluffdale	40.058	64.467	14400 South	Former SR-140
Salt Lake	Bluffdale–Riverton line	40.806– 40.842	65.671– 65.729	SR-154 (Bangerter Highway)	SR-154 exit 3; single-point urban interchange
Salt Lake	Riverton	42.311	68.093	SR-71 (12600 South)	
Salt Lake	South Jordan	43.817	70.517	SR-175 (11400 South)	
Salt Lake	South Jordan	45.068	72.530	SR-151 (10400 South)	
Salt Lake	West Jordan	46.811	75.335	SR-209 (9000 South)	
Salt Lake	West Jordan	48.314	77.754	SR-48 west (7800 South)	South end of SR-48 overlap
Salt Lake	West Jordan	49.312	79.360	SR-48 east (7000 South)	North end of SR-48 overlap
Salt Lake	Taylorsville	50.642– 50.867	81.500– 81.863	I-215	I-215 exit 13; Six ramp partial cloverleaf interchange
Salt Lake	Taylorsville	51.317	82.587	SR-173 (5400 South)	Continuous-flow intersection
Salt Lake	Taylorsville	52.313	84.190	SR-266 (4700 South)	
Salt Lake	Taylorsville	52.462	84.429	Community Boulevard (SR-292)	
Salt Lake	Taylorsville	52.733	84.866	Bruin Boulevard (SR-292)	
Salt Lake	West Valley City	54.308	87.400	SR-171 (3500 South)	Former US-50
Salt Lake	West Valley City–Salt Lake City line	56.104– 56.229	90.291– 90.492	SR-201 (2100 South Freeway)	SR-201 exit 15C; Single-point urban interchange
Salt Lake	Salt Lake City	59.045– 59.168	95.024– 95.222	I-80 to I-215 – Airport, Cheyenne, Reno	I-80 exit 118; Diamond interchange
Salt Lake	Salt Lake City	59.462	95.695	North Temple	Former US-40, SR-186
Salt Lake	Salt Lake City	62.581	100.714	2300 North	Former SR-249
Davis	North Salt Lake	63.652– 63.838	102.438– 102.737	I-215 to I-15 north – Airport, Ogden	I-215 exit 27; Diverging diamond interchange
Davis	Woods Cross	67.261	108.246	500 South to Legacy Parkway (SR-67)	
Davis	West Bountiful–Woods Cross– Bountiful tripoint	68.938– 69.015	110.945– 111.069	I-15 – Ogden, Salt Lake City	I-15 exit 316; Diverging diamond Interchange
Davis	Bountiful	69.211	111.384	US 89 (500 West)	
Davis	Bountiful	69.554	111.936	200 West	Former SR-106
Davis	Woods Cross–Bountiful line	70.623	113.657	US 89 south (Main Street)	Interchange; Northern Terminus; also called Parkin Junction
1.000 mi = 1.609 km; 1.000 km = 0.621 mi: Concurrency terminus
