= Utah State Route 48 =

State highway in Utah, United States

State Route 48

Route information
- Maintained by UDOT
- Length: 4.562 mi (7.342 km)
- Existed: 1927–present

Major junctions
- West end: SR-154 in West Jordan
- SR-68 in West Jordan; I-15 in Midvale
- East end: US 89 in Midvale

Location
- Country: United States
- State: Utah

Highway system
- Utah State Highway System; Interstate; US; State; Minor; Scenic
| ← SR-46 | → US 50 |

State Route 48 (SR-48) is a highway completely within Salt Lake County in northern Utah that connects Bangerter Highway with I-15 and US-89. The route is laid on portions of 7800 South, Redwood Road, and 7200 South. When the route was formed in 1927, it passed through the center of Midvale on Center Street. However, it was moved north onto 7200 South in 1965 to serve an exit of I-15.

== Route description ==
The road begins at a single-point urban interchange on Bangerter Highway at exit 13 and heads east on 7800 South. After approximately 2 miles, the route turns north onto a concurrency with SR-68 for eight blocks before turning east onto 7000 South. The route turns southeast, crosses the Jordan River and enters Midvale. The road turns into 7200 South and straightens out to the east. A single-point urban interchange occurs with I-15 at exit 297. The highway continues east three blocks before terminating at US-89.

The entire route is included as part of the National Highway System.

== History ==
The state legislature added SR-48 to the state highway system in 1927, connecting Bingham with SR-1 (US-91, now US-89) at Midvale Junction. In order to serve the planned I-15 interchange at 7200 South, SR-48 was moved in 1965 to turn north off Center Street onto Holden and Main Streets in Midvale and then east on 7200 South to US-89. As the city of Bingham de-annexed land, a short extension was made at the west end to the new city limits in 1968, but this and more was abandoned in 1973 to allow the Kennecott Copper Corporation to relocate its guard station. An overlap with SR-68 in West Jordan was added in 2000, rerouting SR-48 to turn north at SR-68 and then east on 7000 South to the former alignment at Main Street in Midvale.

In 2012, the construction of the Mountain View Corridor in West Jordan made the New Bingham Highway discontinuous. As a result, SR-48 was slightly realigned to follow 9000 South and 5600 West to connect segments of the New Bingham Highway.

The portion of SR-48 between the Mountain View Corridor and Bangerter Highway was transferred to the city of West Jordan, splitting SR-48 into two segments. The segment of SR-48 west of the Mountain View Corridor was renumbered as an extension of SR-209. This moved the western terminus of SR-48 to Bangerter Highway.

== Major intersections ==
The entire route is in Salt Lake County.

| Location | mi | km | Destinations | Notes |
|---|---|---|---|---|
| West Jordan | 0.000– 0.053 | 0.000– 0.085 | SR-154 (Bangerter Highway) | Western terminus; single-point urban interchange |
| West Jordan | 2.003 | 3.224 | SR-68 (Redwood Road) | South end of SR-68 overlap |
| West Jordan | 2.004 | 3.225 | 7000 South | North end of SR-68 overlap |
| Midvale | 3.814– 3.917 | 6.138– 6.304 | I-15 – Provo, Salt Lake City | |
| Midvale | 4.562 | 7.342 | US 89 (State Street) | Eastern terminus |
1.000 mi = 1.609 km; 1.000 km = 0.621 mi: Concurrency terminus

== See also ==
- List of state highways in Utah
