= Legacy Highway (disambiguation) =

Legacy Highway is a combination of built, under construction, and planned freeways in northern Utah, United States, that will run from eastern Juab County along the west sides of Utah, Salt Lake, Davis, and Weber counties to eastern Box Elder County with the purpose of providing an alternate north–south transportation corridor to Interstate 15. Individually, Legacy Highway may refer to any or all of the following components:

- Utah State Route 85 (Mountain View Highway), a freeway (under construction) Utah and Salt Lake counties in Utah
- Interstate 80, the section of this freeway between the yet-to-be-built interchange with State Route 85 and its interchange with I-215
- Interstate 215, the section of this freeway between its interchange with Interstate 80 and its interchange with State Route 67
- Utah State Route 67 (Legacy Parkway), a freeway in southwest Davis County
- Utah State Route 177 (West Davis Highway), a freeway northwest Davis County

== See also ==
- Legacy Highway (main article)
