= Utah State Route 174 =

State highway in Utah, United States

State Route 174
- SR 174 highlighted in red

Route information
- Maintained by UDOT
- Length: 8.122 mi (13.071 km)
- Existed: 1985–present

Major junctions
- West end: Main gate of Intermountain Power Plant
- East end: US 6 south of Lynndyl

Location
- Country: United States
- State: Utah
- Counties: Millard

Highway system
- Utah State Highway System; Interstate; US; State; Minor; Scenic
← SR-173	→ SR-175

State Route 174 (SR-174) is a state highway in the U.S. state of Utah. Spanning 8.1 miles (13.0 km) in rural Millard County, it connects the Intermountain Power Plant with U.S. Route 6 south of Lynndyl.

== Route description ==
Starting at the main gate of the Intermountain Power Plant in rural Millard County, State Route 174 travels straight in a west-southwest direction for about 8 miles (13 km) along Brush Wellman Road through the Sevier Desert before ending at its intersection with U.S. Route 6.

== History ==
The Utah State Legislature established State Route 174 in 1985, along its current alignment. This coincided with the construction of the Intermountain Power Plant, which commenced in 1981, and began commercial operation in 1986. Before 1969, this was part of the much longer Utah State Route 215.

== Major intersections ==
The entire route is in rural Millard County, Utah.

mi	km	Destinations	Notes
0.000	0.000	Main gate of Intermountain Power Plant	Western terminus
8.122	13.071	US 6 – Delta, Spanish Fork	Eastern terminus
1.000 mi = 1.609 km; 1.000 km = 0.621 mi
