= Utah State Route 154 =

State highway in Salt Lake County, Utah, United States

State Route 154
- Bangerter Highway
- SR-154 highlighted in red

Route information
- Maintained by UDOT
- Length: 24.319 mi (39.138 km)
- Existed: 1989–present

Major junctions
- South end: I-15 and Bangerter Parkway in Draper
- SR-68 in Bluffdale/Riverton; SR-71 in Riverton; SR-175 in South Jordan; SR-48 in West Jordan; SR-173 in Taylorsville; SR-171 in West Valley City; SR-201 in West Valley City; I-80 in Salt Lake City
- North end: Salt Lake City International Airport

Location
- Country: United States
- State: Utah

Highway system
- Utah State Highway System; Interstate; US; State; Minor; Scenic
← SR-153	→ SR-155

State Route 154 (SR-154) or Bangerter Highway (named after former Utah Governor Norman H. Bangerter) is a partial expressway running west and then north from Draper through western Salt Lake County, eventually reaching the Salt Lake City International Airport in Salt Lake City. Construction began in 1988 after planning for the highway began more than two decades prior. For the next ten years, portions of the highway opened as constructed, with the entire route finished by 1998.

Original plans for the six-lane expressway running through the western suburbs of Salt Lake City placed Bangerter Highway running further north past the Salt Lake City International Airport into Davis County. However, any route north of the airport never reached fruition, whereas the original southerly end of the route was extended from Redwood Road to I-15.

== Route description ==
State Route 154 (Bangerter Highway) begins just southeast of a single-point urban interchange at I-15 at the intersection of 13800 South in the Salt Lake City suburb of Draper. The three-lane road curves from the north to the west and widens to four lanes before accessing the I-15 interchange. Past the freeway exit, SR-154 expands to three lanes in each direction with a median barrier in the center. With the exception of two variations in the course of the road prior to an intersection at Redwood Road (SR-68), the highway heads relatively due west (there is a dip to the south for about a mile as the roadway crosses the Jordan River). Throughout its whole route, with four exceptions (I-15, SR-68, SR-48, SR-201, and I-80), SR-154 intersects only major cross streets at grade-level intersections. The route runs into the boundary of Bluffdale and Riverton before definitively entering Riverton boundaries when the highway makes a northerly curve.

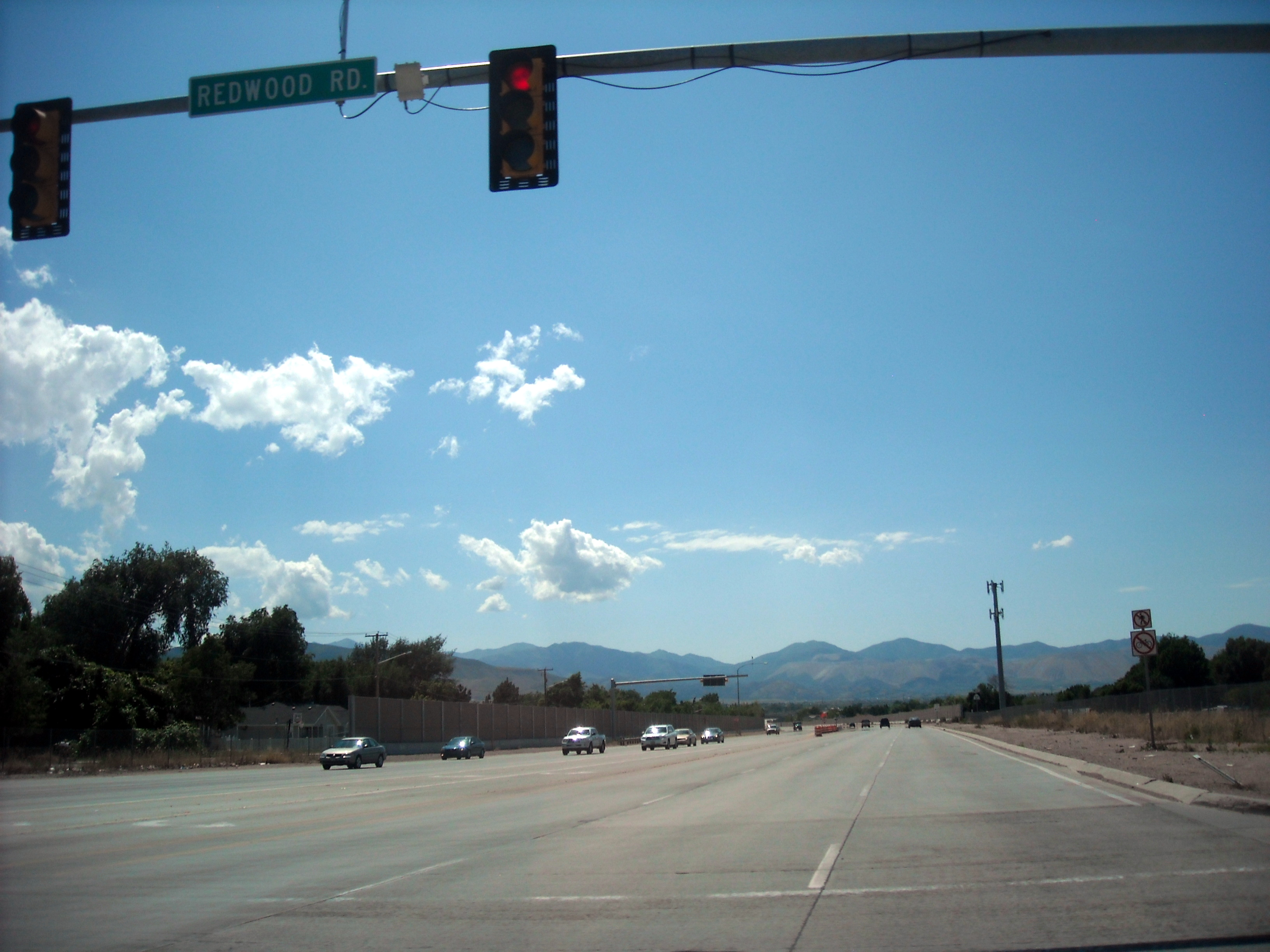
Bangerter Highway westbound at Redwood Road (SR-68)

Making a slight easterly jog in the process, the road maintains its six-lane divided-highway setup as it intersects 13400 South, 12600 South (SR-71) and 11400 South (SR-175 and the access road to Daybreak and the Oquirrh Mountain LDS Temple). Arriving in South Jordan, more cross streets intersect Bangerter Highway (South Jordan Parkway SR-151 and 9800 South) before the route traverses into West Jordan. There is no at-grade intersection at 9000 South and 7800 South SR-48, but an overpass with on- and off- ramps, permitting easy access to South Valley Regional Airport and allowing uninterrupted traffic flow on Bangerter. SR-154 continues, intersecting 7000 South (access to Jordan Landing) and Bennion Boulevard (6200 South). The route slides to the west, entering Taylorsville and crossing 5400 South via overpass with on- and off-ramps (SR-173) and 4700 South.

As SR-154 enters West Valley City, it intersects 4100 South, 3500 South (SR-171), and 3100 South. The highway curves northwest, intersecting with Parkway Boulevard (2700 South), Lake Park Boulevard (2400 South), and 2100 South before meeting SR-201 (21st South Freeway) at a diverging diamond interchange and entering Salt Lake City. Losing one lane in each direction, the route meanders northerly toward the Airport, crossing 1820 South and California Avenue (1300 South) before meeting at a cloverleaf interchange at I-80 and terminating at the access road to the Airport.

== History ==
=== Planning and construction ===
Planning for the West Valley Highway began in the 1960s as a local federal-aid project. The proposed alignment began at the curve in SR-68 near 15300 South and proceeded north-northwesterly and northerly, following a path much like the present alignment to I-80. It continued north along what was then the west boundary of the then Salt Lake City Municipal Airport No. 1 (now Salt Lake City International Airport) into 4000 West, curving east onto 2200 North and ending at I-215. A drainage canal was moved to make room for a loop from 2200 North onto northbound I-215, but when the Interstate was finished south of 2200 North (where it had ended for many years) in the mid-1980s, a diamond interchange was built instead. Later the north segment was rerouted to continue north-northeasterly from the airport into Davis County; parts of this are now the Legacy Parkway. Salt Lake County was able to build the highway between SR-201 (2100 South) and I-80 with federal funding, but it took the state to finish it.

In 1989, the Utah Transportation Commission added a portion of the proposed West Valley Highway to the state highway system as State Route 154. A newly proposed corridor ran west from I-15 near 13400 South to near 3200 West, where it joined the older proposal and headed north to I-80. With the help of Governor Norman H. Bangerter, longtime resident of West Valley City, the project received needed money from the state's general fund, and was opened between SR-201 (2100 South) and SR-171 (3500 South) on November 26, 1991. The Transportation Commission renamed the highway after Bangerter in May 1993. It was finally completed to I-15 on November 17, 1998.

=== Improvements ===
==== Continuous-flow intersections ====
Driving through a continuous flow intersection on SR-154 (Bangerter Highway) at 4100 South in summer 2013.

In 2007, a continuous flow intersection was constructed at the junction of SR-154 and SR-171 (3500 South), one of a very few such intersections in the United States. The intersection is one of the busiest in the state and handles 100,000 vehicles on a typical weekday. In 2011, five more intersections were upgraded to continuous-flow intersections (3100 South, 4100 South, 5400 South/SR-173, 6200 South, and 7000 South) as part of the Bangerter 2.0 project. Another CFI was completed at the 13400 South intersection in 2013.

==== Interchanges ====
UDOT has begun the process of converting several at-grade intersections into grade-separated interchanges, most of them single-point urban interchanges. The first was completed at 7800 South (SR-48) in 2012, followed by one at Redwood Road (SR-68) in 2015.

In 2016, a new interchange was completed at 600 West, the first to not replace a pre-existing intersection. At the same time, the nearby intersection at 200 West was converted to right-in/right-out access only.

Through 2017 and 2018, the Bangerter Four project converted four intersections into interchanges: 5400 South (SR-173), 7000 South, 9000 South (SR-209), and 11400 South (SR-175). The 7000 South interchange was opened in 2017, while the other three were completed in late 2018.

In spring 2020, construction began on a grade-separated interchange at 6200 South, followed by construction of similar interchanges at 12600 South (SR-71) in January 2021 and 10400 South (SR-151) in May 2021. These three interchanges opened on May 19, 2022.

== Future ==
Eventually, all at-grade intersections on Bangerter Highway between I-15 and SR-201 are planned to be upgraded to grade-separated interchanges. Environmental impact statements (EIS) have been completed for Bangerter intersections at 4700 South, 9800 South, and 13400 South. Construction is anticipated to start at these three locations in spring 2023. The interchanges at 4700 South and 13400 South will be constructed as single point urban interchanges while the interchange at 9800 South will be constructed as a tight diamond interchange to minimize impacts to the surrounding community.

== Major intersections ==
The entire route is in Salt Lake County.

Location	mi	km	Exit	Destinations	Notes
Draper	0.000	0.000		13800 South, Bangerter Parkway	
Draper	0.209	0.336		150 East	
Draper	0.467	0.752		I-15 – Provo, Salt Lake	Single-point urban interchange; I-15 exit 289
Draper	0.798	1.284		200 West	Right-in/right-out access only
Draper	1.447	2.329	1	600 West	Single-point urban interchange
Riverton–Bluffdale line	2.355	3.790		Jordan Basin Lane (1000 West)	Right-in/right-out access only, westbound only
Riverton–Bluffdale line	3.242	5.217	3	SR-68 (Redwood Road 1700 West)	Single-point urban interchange
Riverton–Bluffdale line	4.244	6.830	4	2700 West	Tight diamond interchange
Riverton	5.751	9.255	6	13400 South	Single-point urban interchange
Riverton	6.759	10.878	7	SR-71 (12600 South)	Western terminus of SR-71; Single-point urban interchange
South Jordan	8.274	13.316	8	SR-175 (11400 South)	Western terminus of SR-175; Single-point urban interchange
South Jordan	9.600	15.450	9	SR-151 (10400 South)	Western terminus of SR-151; Single-point urban interchange
South Jordan	10.384	16.711	10	9800 South (Shields Lane)	Tight diamond interchange
West Jordan	11.390	18.330	11	SR-209 (9000 South)	Single-point urban interchange
West Jordan	12.884	20.735	13	SR-48 (7800 South)	Single-point urban interchange
West Jordan	13.885	22.346	14	7000 South	Single-point urban interchange
Taylorsville	14.893	23.968	15	6200 South	Single-point urban interchange
Taylorsville	15.930	25.637	16	SR-173 (5400 South)	Single-point urban interchange
Taylorsville–West Valley City line	16.939	27.261	17	4700 South	Single-point urban interchange
West Valley City	17.936	28.865		4100 South	Continuous-flow intersection; proposed single-point urban interchange funded for construction in 2027
West Valley City	18.946	30.491		SR-171 (3500 South)	Continuous-flow intersection; proposed single-point urban interchange funded for construction in 2027
West Valley City	19.455	31.310		3100 South	Continuous-flow intersection; proposed underpass funded for construction in 2027
West Valley City	19.991	32.172		Parkway Boulevard (2700 South)	Proposed tight diamond interchange funded for construction in 2027
West Valley City	20.513	33.012		2400 South	Proposed overpass unfunded for construction
West Valley City	20.839	33.537		2100 South	Proposed interchange unfunded for construction; to be right-in/right-out
West Valley City–Salt Lake City line	21.013	33.817		SR-201 – Magna, Salt Lake City	SR-201 exit 13; Diverging diamond interchange; to be rebuilt into a single-point urban interchange
Salt Lake City	21.388	34.421		1820 South	Proposed interchange unfunded for construction
Salt Lake City	22.267	35.835		California Avenue (1385 South)	Proposed single-point urban interchange unfunded for construction
Salt Lake City	23.708	38.154		I-80 / North Temple Street – Salt Lake City Center, Ogden, Provo, Reno	Cloverleaf interchange with directional ramp; former SR-186; I-80 exit 115A
Salt Lake City	24.319	39.138		Salt Lake City International Airport	Continuation beyond I-80
1.000 mi = 1.609 km; 1.000 km = 0.621 mi

== See also ==
- List of state highways in Utah
