= Elberta, Utah =

- CDP
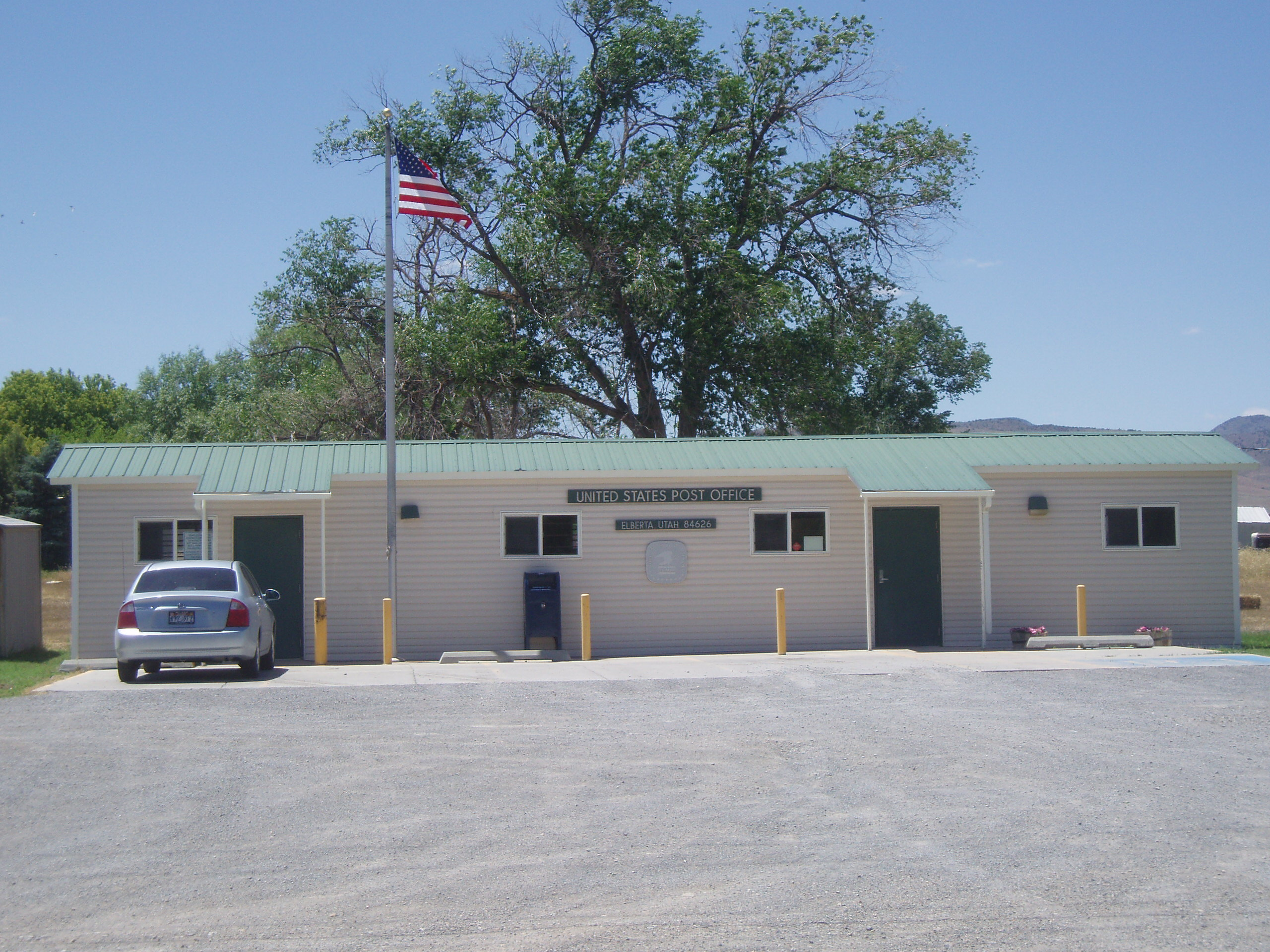
- Elberta Post Office

- Location in Utah County and the state of Utah
- Coordinates: 39°57′21″N 111°57′25″W
- Country: United States
- State: Utah
- County: Utah
- Named for: Early Elberta peach

Area
  - Total: 13.7 sq mi (35.4 km^{2})
  - Land: 13.7 sq mi (35.4 km^{2})
  - Water: 0.039 sq mi (0.1 km^{2})
- Elevation: 4,698 ft (1,432 m)

Population (2020)
  - Total: 180
  - Density: 13/sq mi (5.1/km^{2})
- Time zone: UTC-7 (Mountain (MST))
  - Summer (DST): UTC-6 (MDT)
- ZIP code: 84626
- Area code: 801
- FIPS code: 49-22210
- GNIS feature ID: 2408067

Elberta is a census-designated place (CDP) in Utah County, Utah, United States. It is part of the Provo–Orem Metropolitan Statistical Area. The population was 180 at the 2020 census.

== History ==
It was founded as Mt. Nebo. After the water failed in 1901, most of the early settlers moved away. It was purchased by Matthew B. Whitney, a native of New York, on November 7, 1907, and he renamed it "Elberta" after the peach cultivar.

== Geography ==
Elberta is located near the center of Goshen Valley along U.S. Route 6, three miles west of Goshen.

According to the United States Census Bureau, the CDP has a total area of 13.68 square miles (35.43 km^{2}), of which 13.65 square miles (35.36 km^{2}) is land and 0.03 square miles (0.07 km^{2}), or 0.20%, is water.

== Demographics ==
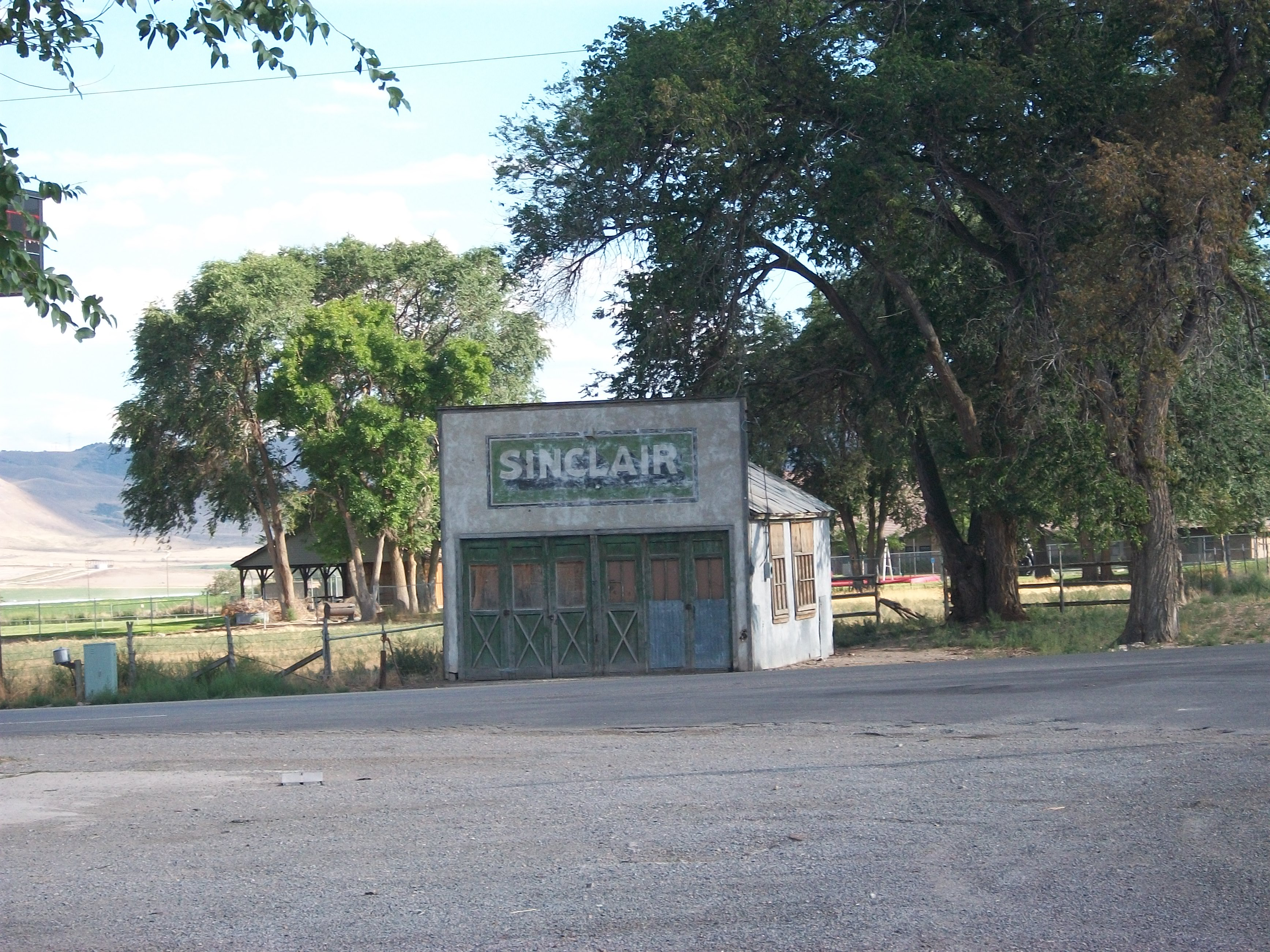
An abandoned Sinclair station in Elberta at the junction of US-6 & SR-68.

As of the census of 2000, there were 278 people, 56 households, and 53 families residing in the CDP. The population density was 20.1 people per square mile (7.7/km^{2}). There were 58 housing units at an average density of 4.2/sq mi (1.6/km^{2}). The racial makeup of the CDP was 80.22% White, 19.42% from other races, and 0.36% from two or more races. Hispanic or Latino of any race were 27.70% of the population.

There were 56 households, out of which 62.5% had children under the age of 18 living with them, 82.1% were married couples living together, 12.5% had a female householder with no husband present, and 3.6% were non-families. 3.6% of all households were made up of individuals, and none had someone living alone who was 65 years of age or older. The average household size was 4.27 and the average family size was 4.26.

In the CDP, the population was spread out, with 41.7% under the age of 18, 13.3% from 18 to 24, 24.8% from 25 to 44, 14.7% from 45 to 64, and 5.4% who were 65 years of age or older. The median age was 23 years. For every 100 females, there were 115.5 males. For every 100 females age 18 and over, there were 113.2 males.

The median income for a household in the CDP was $45,313, and the median income for a family was $45,313. Males had a median income of $26,250 versus $16,250 for females. The per capita income for the CDP was $9,356. None of the families and 12.9% of the population were living below the poverty line.

== LDS Church farms ==
The majority of the property surrounding Elberta is owned by the Church of Jesus Christ of Latter-day Saints (LDS Church), which has significant farming operations in the area to support its welfare program.

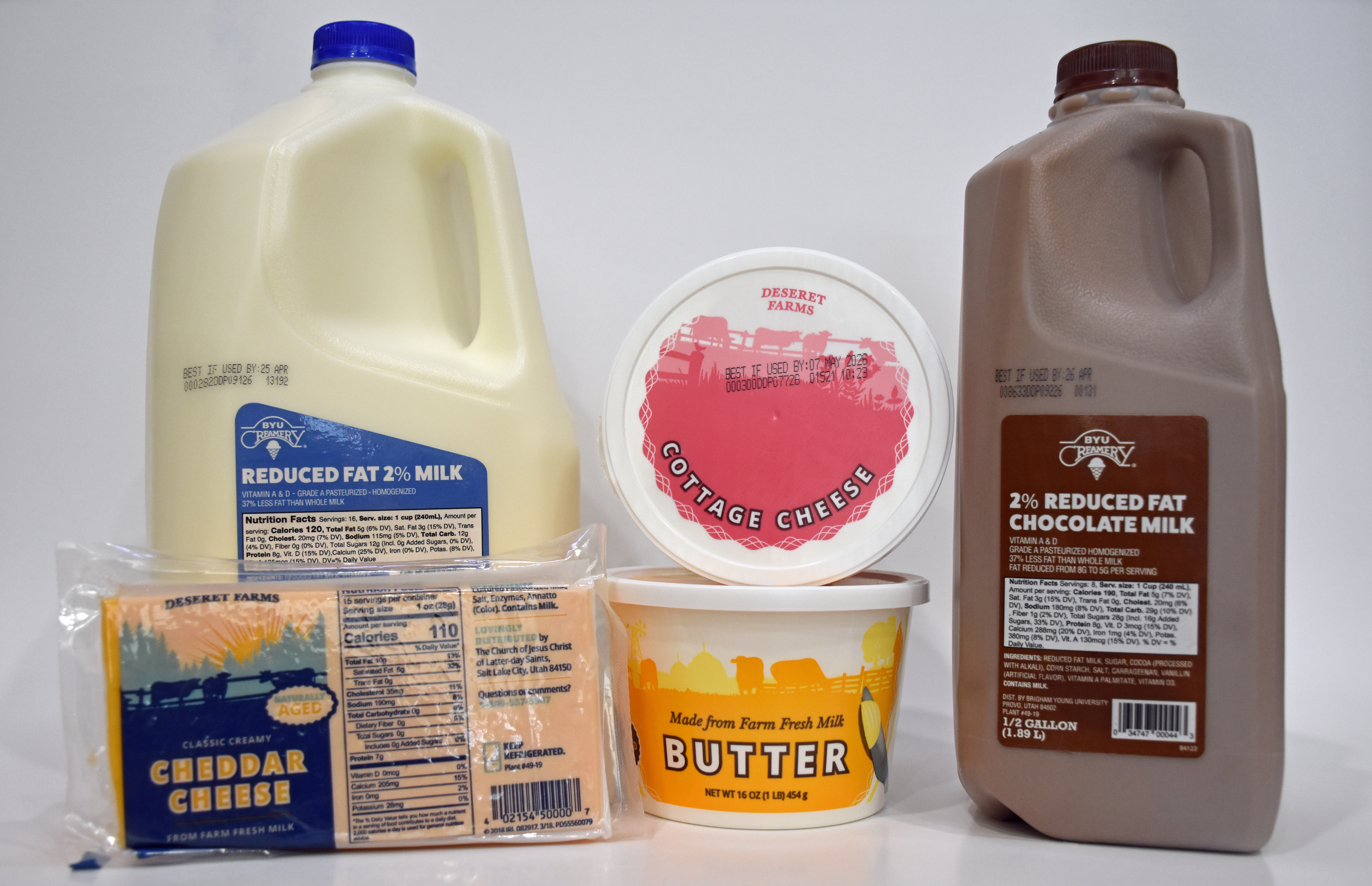
Products produced from the church's dairy milk

The church's early welfare farms were owned by local units, called stakes, with the East Jordan & Butler stakes operating a welfare farm in the Elberta area. In the late 1970s, the church, in coordination with several of its stakes, developed 7,000 acres (2,800 ha) south of Elberta into a large-scale agricultural operation. These operations included the Elberta Multi-Stake Welfare Farm, which produced irrigated crops such as hay, grain, and corn. The Murray East Cottonwood Stakes Dairy was relocated from Murray to the new operation, opening in 1979. Today, the Brigham Creek Dairy (formerly known as the Elberta Dairy) is run by the church's Elberta Valley Ag company. Milk from the dairy is sent for processing to the Deseret Dairy Plant on Welfare Square in Salt Lake City and to BYU Creamery in Provo. The operation also includes a feedlot, which raises livestock to supply meat to the Deseret Meat packing plant in Spanish Fork.

In 2011, the church's LDS Motion Picture Studios opened its south campus on farm property, where it created a set replicating biblical Jerusalem. The set was used for the church's Bible Videos series and was also used as a filming location for The Chosen series.

== Transportation ==
Elberta is centered around the junction of what is now U.S. Route 6 (US-6) and Utah State Route 68 (SR-68). US-6 runs east-west through the south central part of the community, while SR-68 runs north from US-6 through the center of the community (and continues north through Utah and Salt Lake counties and into southern Davis County).

== See also ==
- List of census-designated places in Utah
