= Kent Peterson =

Kent Peterson may refer to:

- Kent Peterson (baseball)
- Kent Peterson (politician)
