= Utah State Route 173 =

State highway in Salt Lake County, Utah, U.S.

State Route 173
- 5400 South/5300 South

Route information
- Maintained by UDOT
- Length: 9.939 mi (15.995 km)
- Existed: 1965–present

Major junctions
- West end: SR-111 in West Valley City
- SR-172 in West Valley City; SR-154 in Taylorsville; SR-68 in Taylorsville; I-15 in Murray
- East end: US 89 in Murray

Location
- Country: United States
- State: Utah

Highway system
- Utah State Highway System; Interstate; US; State; Minor; Scenic
← SR-172	→ SR-174

State Route 173 is a major east–west thoroughfare completely within Salt Lake County in northern Utah. From its western terminus at SR-111 it passes through the growing west side of Salt Lake County, eventually reaching US-89 in Murray.

== Route description ==
Starting at its western terminus in West Valley City, SR-173 (which is routed on 5400 South) heads east through West Valley City, passing by the USANA Amphitheatre. Continuing east, the route enters Kearns, passing by the Utah Olympic Oval and Kearns High School before entering Taylorsville and crossing the Bangerter Highway. Shortly thereafter, the route crosses under I-215 and passes Taylorsville High School at the Redwood Road (SR-68) continuous flow intersection. The route continues eastward, crossing a canal before descending a steep hill to the Jordan River as it enters Murray and shifts slightly to the north (taking the name 5300 South). East of its single-point urban interchange with I-15, the route passes under the Union Pacific, UTA's FrontRunner, and TRAX (Blue and Red) rail lines as they run close together at the approach to Murray Central station, and Cottonwood Street passes over the TRAX line and SR-173 simultaneously on a high viaduct. Emerging from the trench under the railroads, SR-173 passes Intermountain Medical Center (the largest hospital in the Intermountain West) and Murray High School before ending at US-89 (South State Street) near Murray City Park.

The entire route is included as part of the National Highway System.

== History ==
The State Road Commission created State Route 173 in 1965, following 5300 South between SR-68 and SR-271 (US-89), in order to improve access to I-15. The state legislature extended it west to SR-111 in 1969. In 2012, reversible lanes, referred to locally as "flex lanes", were installed between Bangerter Highway and 1900 West.

== Major intersections ==
County	Location	mi	km	Destinations	Notes
Salt Lake	West Valley City	0.000	0.000	SR-111 (Bacchus Highway)	Western terminus
Salt Lake	West Valley City	1.672– 1.745	2.691– 2.808	SR-85 (Mountain View Corridor)	Split intersection
Salt Lake	Kearns	2.752	4.429	SR-172 (5600 West)	
Salt Lake	Taylorsville	5.031	8.097	SR-154 (Bangerter Highway)	
Salt Lake	Taylorsville	7.269	11.698	SR-68 (Redwood Road)	
Salt Lake	Murray	9.199– 9.268	14.804– 14.915	I-15 – Provo, Salt Lake City	
Salt Lake	Murray	9.939	15.995	US 89 (State Street)	Eastern terminus, road continues east as 5300 South to Vine Street
1.000 mi = 1.609 km; 1.000 km = 0.621 mi

== See also ==
- List of state highways in Utah
