= Continuous-flow intersection =

Type of large road intersection

Sample continuous-flow intersection with typical lane variation, turn restrictions, and traffic light position

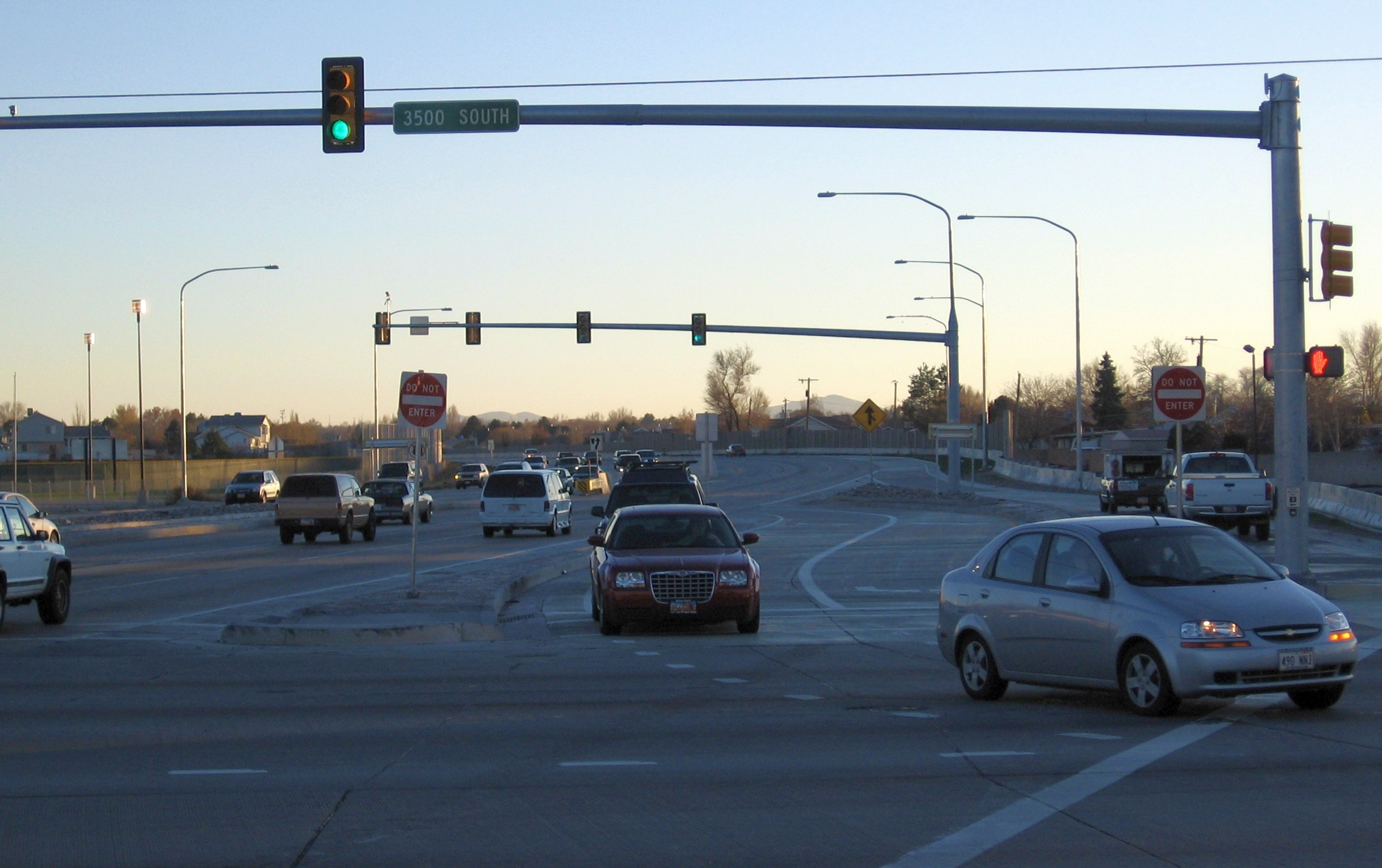
A continuous flow intersection in West Valley City, Utah showing the layout and normal traffic flow in the southwest portion of the intersection.

A continuous flow intersection (or CFI), also called a crossover displaced left-turn (XDL or DLT), is an alternative design for an at-grade road junction. Vehicles attempting to turn across the opposing direction of traffic (left in countries with right-hand traffic; right in those with left-hand traffic) cross before they enter the intersection. No left turn signal in the intersection is then necessary. Instead, vehicles traveling in both directions can proceed, including through vehicles and those turning right or left, when a generic traffic signal or stop sign permits.

Its design also is promoted as part of the Federal Highway Administration's Every Day Counts initiative which started in 2011.

== History ==
Francisco Mier filed in 1987 and received in 1991 U.S. Patent № 5049000 for a fly-over CFI interchange for roads of different grade.. An at-grade intersection version followed. Over 40 have been implemented since 2000. Mier required a licensure fee for users of the design. The patent expired in the United States on 15 October 2003.

This general configuration has appeared in different versions in various places, with the implementation of channelization in the United States since the 1950s, such as the Telegraph Road section of U.S. Route 24 in Michigan at Plymouth Road in Redford Charter Township, Michigan. which was removed in 2019.

== Usage ==
List of places where a CFI is used
| Country | State/Province | City | Roads | Opening date | Coordinates | Notes |
|---|---|---|---|---|---|---|
| Australia | Queensland | Gold Coast | Salerno Street, Bundall Road and Ashmore Road | December 2017 | 28.011815°S 153.411862°E | |
| Australia | Victoria | Melbourne | Punt Road, Swan Street and Olympic Boulevard | September 2019 | 37.824601°S 144.988797°E | |
| Australia | New South Wales | Moore Park | Anzac Parade, Alison Road and Dacey Avenue | 2017 | | |
| Canada | Prince Edward Island | Charlottetown | Charlottetown Perimeter Highway and St. Peters Road | November 29, 2020 | 46.268692°N 63.114001°W | |
| China | Guangdong | Shenzhen | Caitian Road and Fuhua Road | October 7, 2017 | 22.537588°N 114.062896°E | |
| Germany | | Hamburg | Breitenfelder Straße (Bundesstraße 5) and Tarpenbekstraße (Bundesstraße 433) | | 53.590267°N 9.982989°E | |
| Mexico | Coahuila | Saltillo | Paseo de la Reforma and Periférico und Luis Echeverría | | 25.42739°N 100.969859°W | Former configuration, now a directional interchange |
| Mexico | Chihuahua | Juárez Municipality | Manuel Gómez Morin Bermúdez aund De La Industria | | 31.70368°N 106.401998°W | |
| Mexico | Nuevo León | Guadalupe | Between Chapultepec, Puesta del Sol and Av Eloy Cavazos | | 25.661967°N 100.258747°W | |
| United Kingdom | | Swindon | A4311 road, Cricklade Road and Thamesdown Drive | 2003 | 51.601158562°N 1.7812545°W | |
| United States | New Jersey | Camden | New Jersey Route 168 at US Route 130 | | | |
| United States | New Jersey | Audubon, New Jersey | New Jersey Route 168 at Nicholson Road | | 39.894161°N 75.091435°W | |
| United States | New York | Shirley | | 1996 | 40.826443°N 72.881042°W | |
| United States | Maryland | Accokeek | Routes 210 and 228 | 2000 | 38.664126°N 77.016928°W | |
| United States | Maryland | Laurel | MD 200 and US 1 | November 7, 2014 | 39.065800°N 76.881176°W | |
| United States | Louisiana | Baton Rouge | Airline Highway and Siegen Lane | March 2006 | 30.398914°N 91.054119°W | |
| United States | Louisiana | Lafayette | US 167 (Johnston St.) and Camellia Boulevard | 2010 | 30.193744°N 92.058622°W | |
| United States | Utah | Taylorsville | Bangerter Highway and 5400 South (SR-173) | | 40.652993°N 111.981339°W | No longer exists |
| United States | Utah | West Valley City | Bangerter Highway and 4700 South | | 40.667596°N 111.981567°W | No longer exists |
| United States | Utah | West Valley City | Bangerter Highway and 4100 South | | 40.682132°N 111.981626°W | |
| United States | Utah | West Valley City | Bangerter Highway and 3500 South (SR-171) | September 2007 | 40.696629°N 111.980869°W | |
| United States | Utah | West Valley City | Bangerter Highway and 3100 South | | 40.703918°N 111.980076°W | |
| United States | Utah | West Valley City | Bangerter Highway and 6200 South (Bennion Boulevard) | | 40.638581°N 111.976637°W | No longer exists |
| United States | Utah | West Valley City | 5400 S (SR-173) and Redwood Road | | 40.653176°N 111.938802°W | |
| United States | Utah | West Valley City | 6200 South (Bennion Boulevard) and Redwood Road | | 40.638574°N 111.938824°W | |
| United States | Utah | Riverton | Bangerter Highway and 13400 South | | 40.507803°N 111.982747°W | No longer exists |
| United States | Utah | West Jordan | Bangerter Highway and 7000 South | | 40.623983°N 111.976422°W | No longer exists |
| United States | Utah | Orem | University Parkway and Sandhill Road | May 22, 2012 | 40.275014°N 111.713445°W | |
| United States | Mississippi | Natchez | US 61 and Junkin Drive | January 2010 | 31.528599°N 91.389213°W | |
| United States | Mississippi | Oxford | Mississippi Highway 6 and West Jackson Avenue | April 29, 2015 | | |
| United States | Colorado | Loveland | US 34 (Eisenhower Boulevard) and Madison Avenue | | 40.407365°N 105.058764°W | |
| United States | Colorado | Durango | US 160 and US 550 | | 37.268540°N 107.884992°W | |
| United States | Colorado | Colorado Springs | Woodmen Road and Union Boulevard | December 2017 | 38.933079°N 104.775202°W | |
| United States | Colorado | Wheat Ridge | Wadsworth Boulevard at 38th Avenue and 44th Avenue | December 9, 2025 | 39°46'09.7"N 105°04'53.6"W | |
| United States | North Carolina | Charlotte | NC 16 to Mount Holly-Huntersville Road | October 18, 2019 | 35.32566°N, 80.94523°W | |
| United States | North Carolina | Rolesville | U.S. Route 401 and Mitchell Mill Road | 2026 | 35°53'09.6"N 78°31'33.1"W | |
| United States | Texas | Cedar Park | RM 1431 and Ronald Reagan Boulevard/Parmer Lane | August 2, 2016 | 30.534659°N 97.782645°W | |
| United States | Texas | Pflugerville | Dessau Road and Pecan Street | | 30.436611°N 97.613889°W | |
| United States | Texas | San Marcos | Loop 82 (Aquarena Springs Drive) and I-35's southbound-to-northbound Texas U-turn | | 29.893048°N 97.913367°W | |
| United States | Texas | San Marcos | State Highway 80 (Hopkins Street), I-35's frontage roads and I-35's Texas U-turns | | 29.882639°N 97.921915°W | |
| United States | Texas | San Antonio | Bandera Road and Loop 1604 | April 28, 2019 | 29.553655°N 98.667302°W | |
| United States | Georgia | Dawsonville | SR 400 and SR 53 | May 15, 2017 | 34.363385°N 84.036474°W | |
| United States | Indiana | Indianapolis | US 31 and Thompson Road | October 8, 2022 | 39.693213°N 86.148812°W | |
| United States | Indiana | Ohio Township (Warrick County) | IN 66 and Epworth Road | August 20, 2024 | 37.976790°N 87.441226°W | |
| United States | Indiana | Evansville | IN 66 and Stockwell Road | June 18, 2025 | 37.976675°N 87.502408°W | Hybrid design with one displaced left turn and a Michigan left as the other turn. |
| United States | Indiana | Evansville | IN 66 and Burkhardt Road | August 17, 2026 (westbound) | 37.976625°N 87.474061°W | Currently only open to westbound turns. The eastbound turn lanes are scheduled to open in fall 2026. |
| United States | Indiana | Evansville | IN 66 and Eagle Crest/Cross Pointe Boulevards | August 17, 2026 (westbound) | 37.976743°N 87.462698°W | Currently only open to westbound turns. The eastbound turn lanes are scheduled to open in fall 2026. |
| United States | Ohio | Anderson Township | Beechmont Avenue (State Route 125) and Five Mile Road | May 19, 2017 | 39°4′22″N 84°21′7″W | |
| United States | Ohio | Miami Township (Montgomery County) | SR 741 and Miamisburg-Springboro Road/Austin Boulevard | 2009 | 39.596709°N 84.229029°W | |
| United States | Virginia | Norfolk | Military Highway onto Northampton Boulevard and Princess Anne Road | July 28, 2018 | 36.874804°N 76.210739°W | |
| United States | Florida | Fort Myers | State Road 82 to Daniels Parkway (west) and Gunnery Road (east) | July 9, 2019 | 26.581661°N 81.713761°W | |
| United States | Kansas | Olathe | Old 56 Highway to Lone Elm Road | June 2021 | | |
| United States | Missouri | Fenton | Highway 30 and Summit Drive/Gravois Bluffs Boulevard | October 2007 | 38.504276°N 90.456995°W | |

Driving through a continuous flow intersection on Utah State Route 154 (Bangerter Highway) at 4100 South in summer 2013.

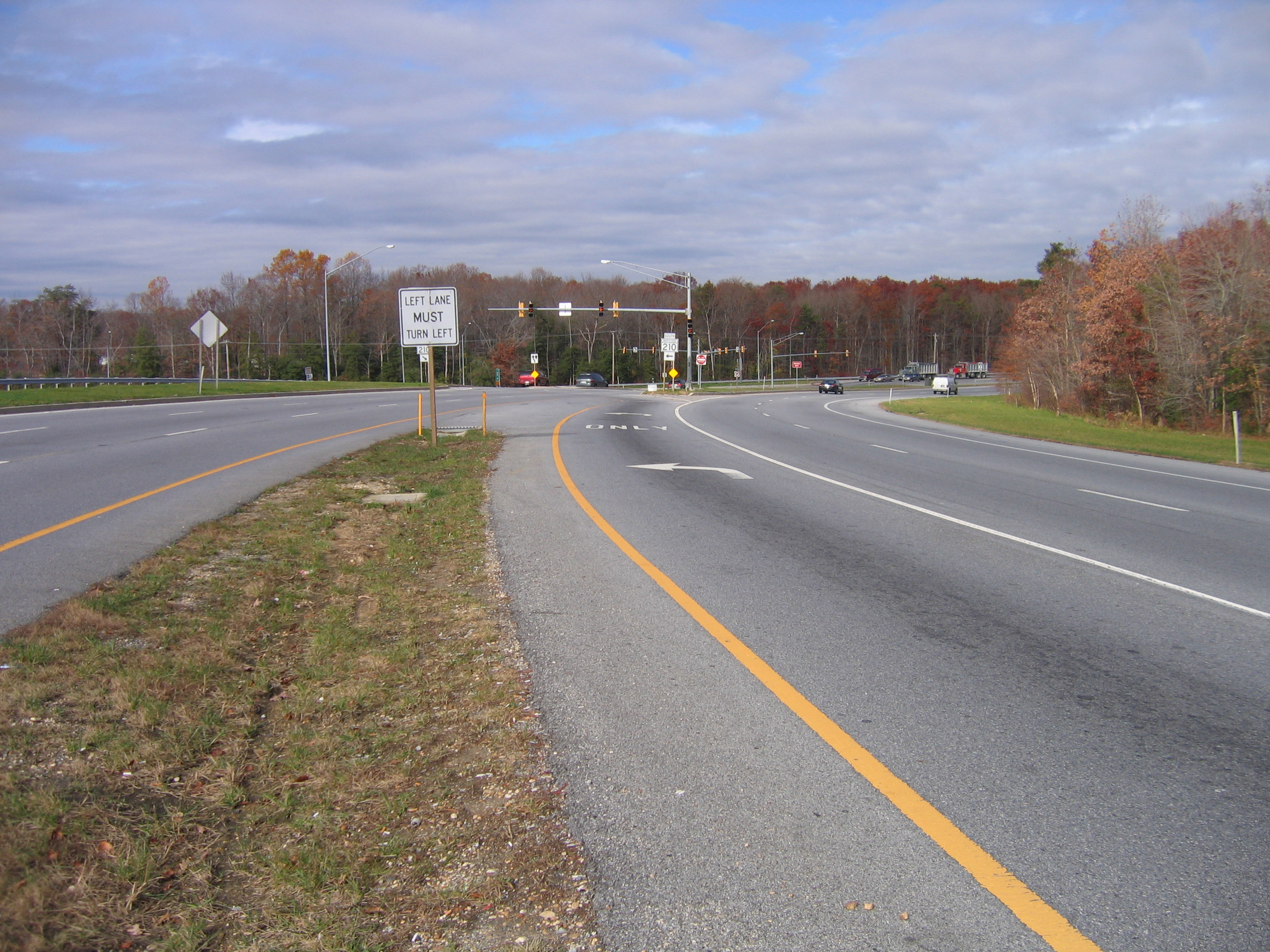
A continuous flow intersection between Maryland Route 210 and Maryland Route 228 in Accokeek, Maryland.

Sketch and traffic light sequence of a four-way intersection with displaced left turns on two of the legs.

== Operational details ==
Part of the delay at a typical high-volume right-hand traffic intersection is to accommodate left-turns; through-traffic must wait for the traffic turning left because it crosses the path of the through traffic. The continuous flow intersection moves the left-turn conflict out of the intersection and synchronizes it with the signal cycle of the intersecting road.

In the adjacent diagram, while the left/right traffic flows through the main intersection, the left-turn traffic crosses to the opposite side of the oncoming traffic a few hundred feet away. Doing this removes the crossing conflict. When the north/south through traffic is allowed through the main intersection, the north/south left-turn lanes are also allowed through the intersections as their paths are no longer crossing. All traffic flow is controlled by traffic signals as at a regular intersection.

The Louisiana DOTD article on the Baton Rouge CFI includes a particularly informative diagram of that intersection.

To reduce confusion regarding the left-turn lane, the left-turn lane and the straight-through lanes are usually separated by a concrete barrier or traffic island. This diagram shows the straight-through lanes offset by one lane through the intersection and are guided by lines painted through the intersection. But this is just a sample configuration; the lanes may be offset by more lanes or none at all.

Nonetheless, due to the provision of traffic between two directions of opposing traffic, some motorists tend to maintain an ongoing criticism of the intersection. Additionally, as in the case of the half-CFI in Accokeek, the offset left-turn traffic reenters the main traffic stream via a half-signal, requiring motorists to merge from a stop condition onto the higher-speed mainline. Motorists sometimes cite discomfort due to the speed differential, a known cause of accidents, though conflicts can be reduced through the provision of an adequate acceleration lane and merge area. The Accokeek, Maryland CFI also has notable inequalities in traffic flow depending upon the direction of travel.

This type of intersection can require a significant amount of right-of-way to implement (dependent upon the configuration), which is why the technique is not frequently used in urban areas. However, the amount of right-of-way necessary for construction and final operation is still typically less than that of an interchange. Additionally, as there is no grade separation involved, costs are considerably less than that of an interchange alternative.

== Case studies ==
The redesign of the Redwood Road/6200 South intersection in Taylorsville, Utah cut emissions of carbon dioxide by 19 tons (17 tonnes) per year. Compared to the previous design, the redesign of the Bangerter Highway/3500 South intersection saves 3 1/2 minutes of travel time per vehicle and 800,000 U.S. gallons (3,000,000 liters) of fuel per year, and has 60% fewer accidents nearby; it also cost $20 million to $40 million less in construction costs than a grade-separated alternative.

== Parallel-flow intersection ==
A parallel-flow intersection (PFI) is a variant similar to the CFI, patented in 2006. It arranges the left-turning traffic in a different manner; it is not displaced, instead turning left closer to the intersection onto a parallel roadway, to the left of oncoming traffic. This was first used in New Jersey at the junction of New Jersey Route 168 and US Highway 130, between Haddon Township and Camden (39.90412°N 75.095812°W).

== See also ==
- Junction (road)
- Advanced stop line
- Bowtie
- Box junction
- Hook turn
- Jughandle
- Michigan left
- Quadrant roadway intersection
- Roundabout
- Seagull intersection
- Slip lane
- Staggered junction
- Superstreet
- Texas T
- Texas U-turn
- Turnaround (road)
