= Mountain View Corridor =

State highway in Utah and Salt Lake counties in Utah, United States

State Route 85
- Mountain View Corridor
- Mountain View Corridor highlighted in red

Route information
- Maintained by UDOT
- Length: 35 mi (56 km)

Major junctions
- South end: SR-73 in Saratoga Springs
- SR-48 in West Jordan; SR-173 in West Valley City; SR-171 in West Valley City; SR-201 in West Valley City
- North end: I-80 in Salt Lake City

Location
- Country: United States
- State: Utah

Highway system
- Utah State Highway System; Interstate; US; State; Minor; Scenic
← I-84	→ SR-86

The Mountain View Corridor is a freeway under construction in northern Utah that will run along the western periphery of Salt Lake County and south into northwest Utah County. Except for the last several miles on its southern end the Mountain View Corridor is numerically designated as State Route 85 (SR-85) in the Utah state highway system. The entire Mountain View Corridor is maintained by the Utah Department of Transportation (UDOT).

== Route description ==
Mountain View Corridor is an arterial road that runs roughly parallel to Bangerter Highway (SR-154) one to four miles to the west, built to meet the demand of the growing cities in western Salt Lake and Utah counties.

Mountain View Corridor starts at SR-73 in Saratoga Springs and runs north, interchanging with 2100 North (SR-194) before running to the east of the Utah Data Center, then travels northwest to 13400 South at about 4800 West in Riverton and then continues north again to 12600 South. From 12600 South it curves northwest again, crossing Daybreak Parkway (at about 11700 South) in Daybreak—a neighborhood of South Jordan—to the Old Bingham Highway (at about 10200 South) in West Jordan, and then curves slightly back to the northeast until it reaches 9000 South just west of 5600 West.

From 9000 South it heads north, crossing over 8200 South, until 7800 South where it curves northwest to 7000 South at about 6400 West. From 7000 South it proceeds north, crossing 6200 South, to 5400 South (SR-173). From 5400 South it curves northeast again until it reaches 4100 South in West Valley City at about 5700 West and heads north again, crossing 3500 South (SR-171), to a junction with SR-201.

From SR-201 it continues north and ends at California Avenue in Salt Lake City. Future development plans will have it continue past California Avenue and curve northwest once again before ending at a junction with Interstate 80 at about 6100 West in Salt Lake City (a few miles west of the Salt Lake City International Airport).

== Construction ==
=== Phases ===
Plans call for three phases of construction. Upon final completion, the freeway will have five lanes in each direction, including a high-occupancy/toll (HOT) lane. Some sections will also include two-lane frontage roads on both sides of the freeway.

Phase One includes constructing either the outside lanes or two one-way frontage roads for each section of the entire length of the Mountain View Corridor, but not all at the same time. Phase One construction is being completed on the various sections as the need exists and funding permits. For the "outside lanes" sections the two outside lanes of the freeway are built in each direction. At each future interchange the roadways curve out to the edges of the right of way where future off-ramps of the freeway will be, creating two one-way intersections. For the "frontage roads" sections, two one-way frontage roads will be on either side of the planned freeway lanes. Two one-way intersections will also be created at each future interchange, just as they will be for the "outside lanes" sections, except that the future off-ramps and on-ramps will connect with the frontage roads prior to and after the interchanges, respectively. (Such frontage roads and interchanges are often referred to as Texas style.) Frontage roads will be built between Old Bingham Highway and Porter Rockwell Boulevard, as well as the 2100 North spur. The remaining sections will have the outside lanes built in Phase One.

Phase Two is where the actual freeway is constructed as needs require and funding permits. By building either the outside lanes or frontage roads in the unique manner that has been done in Phase One preserved space in the middle to build overpasses and the actual freeway lanes themselves where only the frontage roads were constructed. Also, having been built the way they were, there will be minimal traffic interruption while Phase Two is completed.

Phase Three will widen the freeway from two lanes to five in each direction (with one of those lanes provisioned as an HOT lane), again as the need exists and funding permits.

In mid-2010, Utah County planners discussed future plans for a freeway in Utah County from Lehi to Santaquin along the west side of SR-68 west of Utah Lake. It has been speculated that this could become part of the Mountain View Corridor project.

The first sections of Mountain View Corridor opened for traffic in a design of separated two lane carriageways with signal controlled at-grade split intersections, to be upgraded later.

=== Implementation ===
The environmental impact statement for the freeway was completed in November 2008, leaving funding for the highway as the biggest remaining obstacle. Previous proposals included raising the state fuel tax or tolling the new road as a public/private partnership, an issue that became highly contentious. Ultimately, the state legislature decided to issue bonds to fund the freeway, thereby committing future tax receipts to pay for it. The first phase of construction began in mid-2010 and finished by December 15, 2012.

Construction on the spur known as 2100 North, which will connect the eventual freeway with Interstate 15, began in late 2010. This spur, which initially travels as far west as Redwood Road (SR-68), opened September 24, 2011. During Phase Two, this spur will be extended further west to the future freeway.

Construction on two miles of frontage roads in Herriman between Rosecrest Drive and 12600 South has been completed and this portion opened for traffic on June 2, 2012. An additional seven miles of frontage road is nearly complete and is anticipated to be open for use on October 13, 2012. These additional portions are will extend the usable roadway from Porter Rockwell Boulevard in Bluffdale north to the Old Bingham Highway in West Jordan. Six more miles of frontage road further north are also anticipated to be completed in late 2012. By the end of 2012 a total of fifteen miles of Phase One frontage roads, extending from Porter Rockwell Boulevard north to 5400 South in West Valley City, will be open for use, as well as associated bike lanes and trails. In 2016 the access to 5400 South (SR-173) completed, and construction continued northbound.

While no specific time table has been given by UDOT for the remainder of the overall project, it is anticipated to be fully completed by 2030.

=== Progress ===
As of 2021, Mountain View Corridor is entirely in Stage 1 of the construction plan. Funding has been given to convert the segment running from Porter Rockwell Boulevard to Old Bingham Highway to a Stage 2 Freeway. The entire roadway that is currently built extends from Redwood Road (SR-68) to California Avenue. The section between 5400 South and 4100 South opened on November 18, 2017, at 3:00 pm. Opening celebrations included a fun run, an ugly sweater competition, and ceremonies where the Mayor of West Valley City spoke. In October 2019, another portion in Utah County opened to traffic, connecting SR-73 and Pioneer Crossing (SR-145) to Redwood Road and 2100 North (SR-194). The next section of Mountain View Corridor in Salt Lake County (4100 South to California Avenue) opened to traffic on June 17, 2021. Another section of Mountain View Corridor in Bluffdale between 2100 South (SR-194) and Porter Rockwell Boulevard opened to traffic on December 19, 2025.

The segment between California Avenue and Interstate 80 is currently unfunded, and it is unknown when it will be completed. In September 2021, funding was allocated to build the Phase 1 iteration of the segment running from 2100 North to Porter Rockwell Boulevard. Until the 2100 North to Porter Rockwell segment of the corridor was completed in 2025, SR-85 was routed along a concurrency with SR-68 between those roads.

== Exit list ==
This following table lists the interchanges of the Mountain View Corridor at full build-out.

County	Location	mi	km	Exit	Destinations	Notes
Utah	Saratoga Springs	0.000	0.000		Foothill Boulevard south	Continuation south beyond southern terminus
Utah	Saratoga Springs	0.000	0.000		SR-73 west (Cory B. Wride Memorial Highway) SR-145 east (Pioneer Crossing)	Southern terminus
Utah	Saratoga Springs	0.814	1.310		Harvest Hills Boulevard	
Utah	Lehi	2.977	4.791		SR-194 east (2100 North)	
Salt Lake	Herriman	3.528	5.678		SR-131 east (Porter Rockwell Boulevard)	Future freeway interchanges to begin construction in 2027
Salt Lake	Herriman	5.028	8.092		Academy Parkway	Future freeway interchanges to begin construction in 2027
Salt Lake	Herriman	5.759	9.268		Real Vista Drive	Future freeway interchanges to begin construction in 2027
Salt Lake	Herriman	6.565	10.565		Rosecrest Drive	Future freeway interchanges to begin construction in 2027
Salt Lake	Riverton	7.905	12.722		13400 South	Future freeway interchanges to begin construction in 2027
Salt Lake	Herriman–Riverton line	8.916	14.349		12600 South	Future freeway interchanges to begin construction in 2027
Salt Lake	Herriman–South Jordan line	9.968	16.042		11800 South	Future freeway interchanges to begin construction in 2027
Salt Lake	South Jordan	10.260	16.512		Daybreak Parkway	Future freeway interchanges to begin construction in 2027
Salt Lake	South Jordan	11.330	18.234		South Jordan Parkway	Future freeway interchanges to begin construction in 2027
Salt Lake	West Jordan	12.461	20.054		Old Bingham Highway	Future freeway interchanges to begin construction in 2027
Salt Lake	West Jordan	13.917	22.397		SR-209 (9000 South)	
Salt Lake	West Jordan	15.454	24.871		7800 South	
Salt Lake	West Valley City	17.652	28.408		6200 South	
Salt Lake	West Valley City	18.658	30.027		SR-173 (5400 South)	
Salt Lake	West Valley City	20.839	33.537		4100 South	
Salt Lake	West Valley City	21.853	35.169		SR-171 (3500 South)	
Salt Lake	West Valley City	22.861	36.791	23	Parkway Boulevard	Interchange; southbound entrance and northbound exit
Salt Lake	West Valley City–Salt Lake City line	23.901	38.465	24	SR-201 (2100 South Freeway)	Signed as exits 24A (east) and 24B (west) northbound; no southbound access to SR-201 east
Salt Lake	Salt Lake City	24.892	40.060		California Avenue	Current northern terminus
Salt Lake	Salt Lake City				I-80	Future northern terminus
1.000 mi = 1.609 km; 1.000 km = 0.621 mi: Incomplete access; Unopened
