= Goshen, Utah =

Town in the state of Utah, United States

- Town
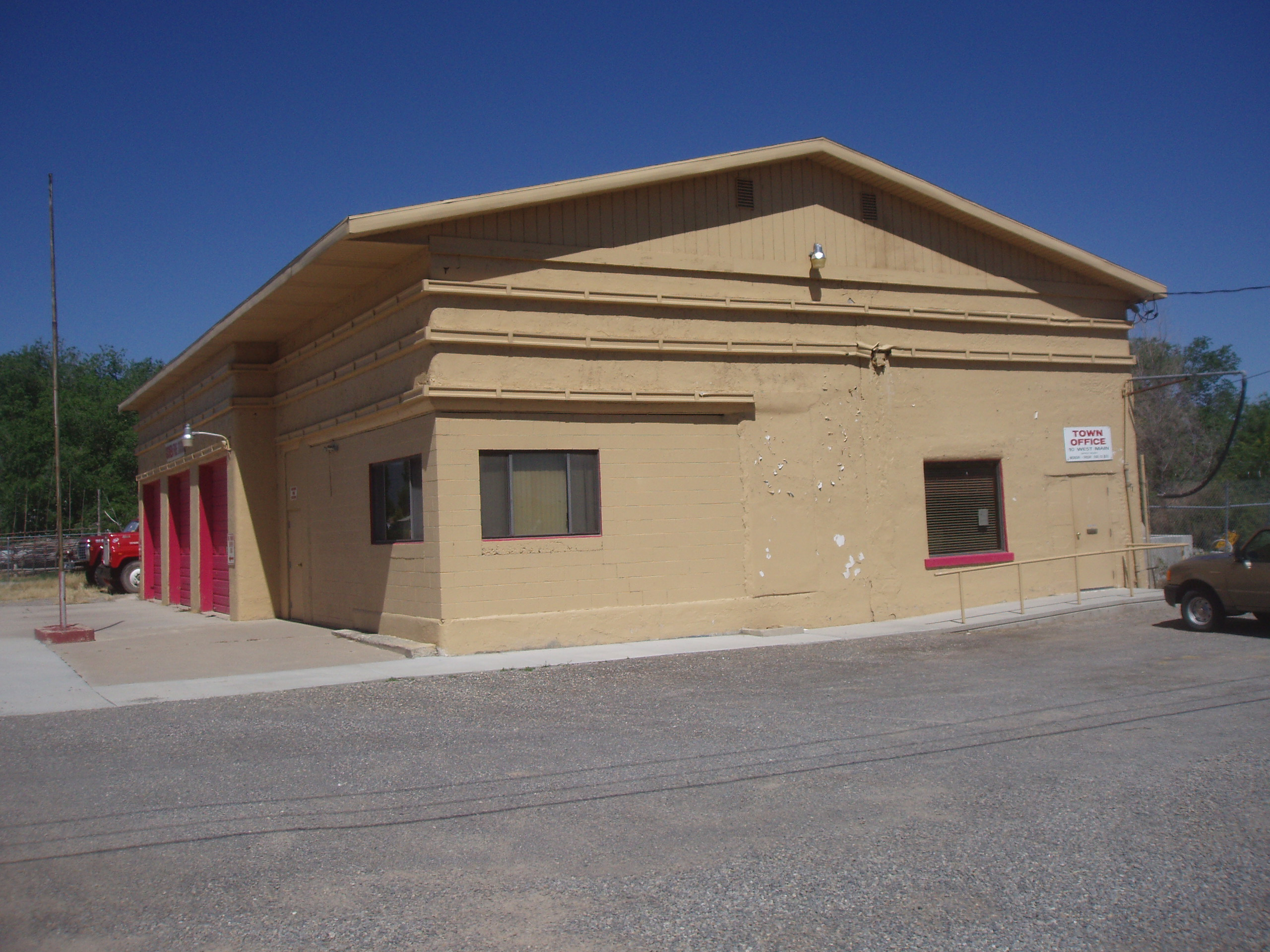
- Goshen Town Office

- Location in Utah County and the state of Utah
- Coordinates: 39°57′04″N 111°54′03″W
- Country: United States
- State: Utah
- County: Utah
- Settled: 1857
- Incorporated: 1910
- Named for: Goshen, Connecticut

Area
  - Total: 0.83 sq mi (2.14 km^{2})
  - Land: 0.83 sq mi (2.14 km^{2})
  - Water: 0 sq mi (0.00 km^{2})
- Elevation: 4,557 ft (1,389 m)

Population (2020)
  - Total: 978
  - Density: 1,107/sq mi (427.5/km^{2})
- Time zone: UTC-7 (Mountain (MST))
  - Summer (DST): UTC-6 (MDT)
- ZIP code: 84633
- Area codes: 385, 801
- FIPS code: 49-30130
- GNIS feature ID: 2412693
- Website: www.goshenutah.gov

Goshen is a town in Utah County, Utah, United States. It is part of the Provo–Orem Metropolitan Statistical Area. The population was 978 at the 2020 census.

== History ==
The first settlement at Goshen was made in 1857 by a colony of Mormon pioneers. The community was named after Goshen, Connecticut.

== Geography ==
According to the United States Census Bureau, the town has a total area of 0.7 square mile (1.9 km^{2}), all land.

=== Climate ===
Large seasonal temperature differences typify this climatic region, with warm to hot (and often humid) summers and cold (sometimes severely cold) winters. According to the Köppen Climate Classification system, Goshen has a humid continental climate, abbreviated "Dfb" on climate maps.

== Demographics ==
Historical population
Census	Pop.	Note	%±
1880	645		—
1890	298		−53.8%
1900	645		116.4%
1910	470		−27.1%
1920	526		11.9%
1930	669		27.2%
1940	616		−7.9%
1950	525		−14.8%
1960	426		−18.9%
1970	459		7.7%
1980	582		26.8%
1990	578		−0.7%
2000	874		51.2%
2010	921		5.4%
2020	978		6.2%
Source: U.S. Census Bureau

At the 2000 census, there were 874 people, 272 households, and 214 families in the town. The population density was 1,213.6 people per square mile (468.7/km^{2}). There were 295 housing units at an average density of 409.6 per square mile (158.2/km^{2}). The racial makeup of the town was 92.22% White, 0.57% Native American, 5.49% from other races, and 1.72% from two or more races. Hispanic or Latino of any race were 8.35%.

Of the 272 households, 48.2% had children under 18 living with them, 70.2% were married couples living together, 5.5% had a female householder with no husband present, and 21.0% were non-families. 19.1% of households were one person, and 9.2% were one person aged 65 or older. The average household size was 3.21, and the average family size was 3.73.

The age distribution was 38.7% under the age of 18, 10.1% from 18 to 24, 26.5% from 25 to 44, 16.8% from 45 to 64, and 7.9% 65 or older. The median age was 26 years. For every 100 females, there were 97.3 males. For every 100 females aged 18 and over, there were 99.3 males.

The median household income was $41,458, and the median family income was $45,855. Males had a median income of $31,750 versus $21,771 for females. The per capita income for the town was $12,053. About 7.5% of families and 13.9% of the population were below the poverty line, including 20.2% of those under age 18 and 6.6% of those aged 65 or over.

== Culture ==
In 1998, the horror film Bats and the comedy-action film Made Men both shot scenes in Goshen.

Near Goshen is a large agriculture operation run by the welfare system of the Church of Jesus Christ of Latter-day Saints (LDS Church). In 2011, the church's LDS Motion Picture Studios opened its south campus on farm property, where it created a film set replicating biblical Jerusalem. The set was used for the church's Bible Videos series and permission was given to Dallas Jenkins to use the set as a filming location for several seasons of The Chosen series.

== Notable person ==
- Kent Peterson, left-handed pitcher for the Cincinnati Reds and Philadelphia Phillies

== See also ==
- Tintic Standard Reduction Mill
