= Riverton, Utah =

City in Utah, United States

- City
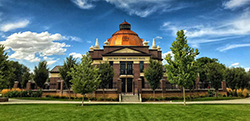
- Old Dome Meeting Hall in Riverton

- Flag Logo

- Location in Salt Lake County and the state of Utah.

- Location of Utah in the United States
- Coordinates: 40°31′14″N 111°57′19″W
- Country: United States
- State: Utah
- County: Salt Lake
- Settled: 1865
- Incorporated: 1947
- Named for: Jordan River

Government
  - Type: Mayor–council government
  - Mayor: Tish Buroker
  - City Council: Andy Pierucci,Troy McDougal,Spencer Haymond,Alexander Johnson,Shannon Smith
  - City Manager: Craig Giles

Area
  - Total: 12.58 sq mi (32.59 km^{2})
  - Land: 12.58 sq mi (32.59 km^{2})
  - Water: 0 sq mi (0.00 km^{2}) 0%
- Elevation: 4,439 ft (1,353 m)

Population (2020)
  - Total: 45,285
  - Estimate: 47,373
  - Density: 3,599/sq mi (1,390/km^{2})
- Time zone: UTC−7 (MST)
  - Summer (DST): UTC−6 (MDT)
- ZIP Code: 84065, 84096, 84095
- Area codes: 385, 801
- FIPS code: 49-64340
- GNIS feature ID: 1431862
- Website: rivertonutah.gov

Riverton is a city in Salt Lake County, Utah, United States. It is part of the Salt Lake City metropolitan area. The population was 45,285 as of the 2020 census. Riverton is located in the rapidly growing southwestern corner of the Salt Lake Valley.

== History ==
Located in the southern end of Salt Lake Valley, the area that is now Riverton was first settled by people of European descent in the mid-1850s. These early settlers scattered widely along the river bottom in crude dugout homes. Although the early accounts disagree, Archibald Gardner may have been the first to settle Riverton land. The town was originally referred to as “Gardnerville” prior to changing its name to Riverton. Riverton's initial growth was slow because of the lack of water for irrigation. When more water became available, the town began to grow. Eventually three canals were built to extend water from the nearby Jordan River to the benchland areas, providing irrigation for agricultural uses to the larger area.

By the beginning of World War I in 1914, with its additional irrigation water and influx of people, Riverton prospered as an agricultural community. Its thriving business district was also evident at this time.

=== Commercial development history ===
The Page-Pixon store was built around the start of the 20th century, west of Redwood Road at 12760 South. The large department store sold everything from building materials, coal and dry goods to groceries, grain and housewares. This building was set back off the road and had a tie rail in front of it for tying up horses.

The Jordan Valley Bank was started in 1905 as a community bank. This bank was first housed in the Page-Hansen Store then the Commercial Building. In 1920 it moved across the street, to the south. Other businesses coming to Riverton in the ten-year period before and after the First World War included Bill's Meat Market, Gilbert Lloyd's Blacksmith Shop, Riverton Motors, the Riverton, Utah Canning Factory, the Riverton Alfalfa Mill, Utah Poultry Company and numerous others ranging from theaters to mercantile stores.

Farming was also a major Riverton business. Just before the turn of the century, the farmers in Riverton gradually began to change from self-sufficient farming to commercial farming. In its early years Riverton's farmers were mostly self-sufficient, producing almost everything they needed. This was no longer the case when farming became a business. Riverton farmers were becoming specialists concentrating mostly on alfalfa, wheat, sugar beets, tomatoes, poultry, sheep or dairy cows. At this time, on land purchased from Samuel Howard in 1886, The Church of Jesus Christ of Latter-day Saints began to store tithed produce and livestock. It was not long until the hill that this enterprise was located on, at 1150 West 12400 South, became known as Tithing Yard Hill, which is now a residential planned development under the same name.

Electricity first came to Riverton in 1912. In 1913 the Salt Lake and Utah Railroad (Orem Line) was started and went through Riverton west of Redwood Road. It was used as a commuter and freight line and stretched from Salt Lake to Payson in Utah County. Trains used this line from 1914 to 1945 after which the rails and ties were removed. Riverton had its own train depot which was also torn down when the line was closed.

=== Educational development history ===
The community's first school had only one room. It was located in the old adobe meetinghouse used by the LDS branch on 1300 West. In 1892, a new two-story brick schoolhouse was built at 12830 South on Redwood Road. This structure had four rooms, two upstairs and two down and was built in January 1893. It was used by grades one through eight, two grades to a classroom. John Hansen was the first principal of this school. As the population grew additional classrooms were needed and another building for elementary grades was erected to the north of the four-room schoolhouse. In 1925 the south building was torn down and the north building remodeled. However, before the remodeling was completed, a fire struck—completely destroying the school on July 30, 1926. A junior high continued to be built on the south lot and the new elementary school which matched the junior high in brick color and design was erected on the site of the fire-destroyed building. Both these structures eventually became the Riverton Elementary School complex. The increased population of the 1970s and 1980s necessitated the construction of two new Riverton elementary schools. Southland Elementary was built on 2700 West and 12675 South and Rosamond Elementary at 1975 West and 12195 South.

By 1948 Riverton had grown sufficiently to be incorporated into a city. However, the city's progress was temporarily halted by World War II, the final stage of the farming community's evolution occurred in the 1960s and 1970s. Land prices skyrocketed and Riverton's subdivisions expanded. Farmers sold land at prices many times the price they paid for it. Land was out of reach for young farmers, many of whom moved to Idaho and other neighboring states. This was mirrored throughout Salt Lake county as the number of farms decreased from 2,595 in 1950 to 798 in 1969. Nevertheless, Riverton's population more than tripled between 1970 when it totaled 2,820 inhabitants, and the mid-1980s when it reached around 10,000.

=== Community development history ===
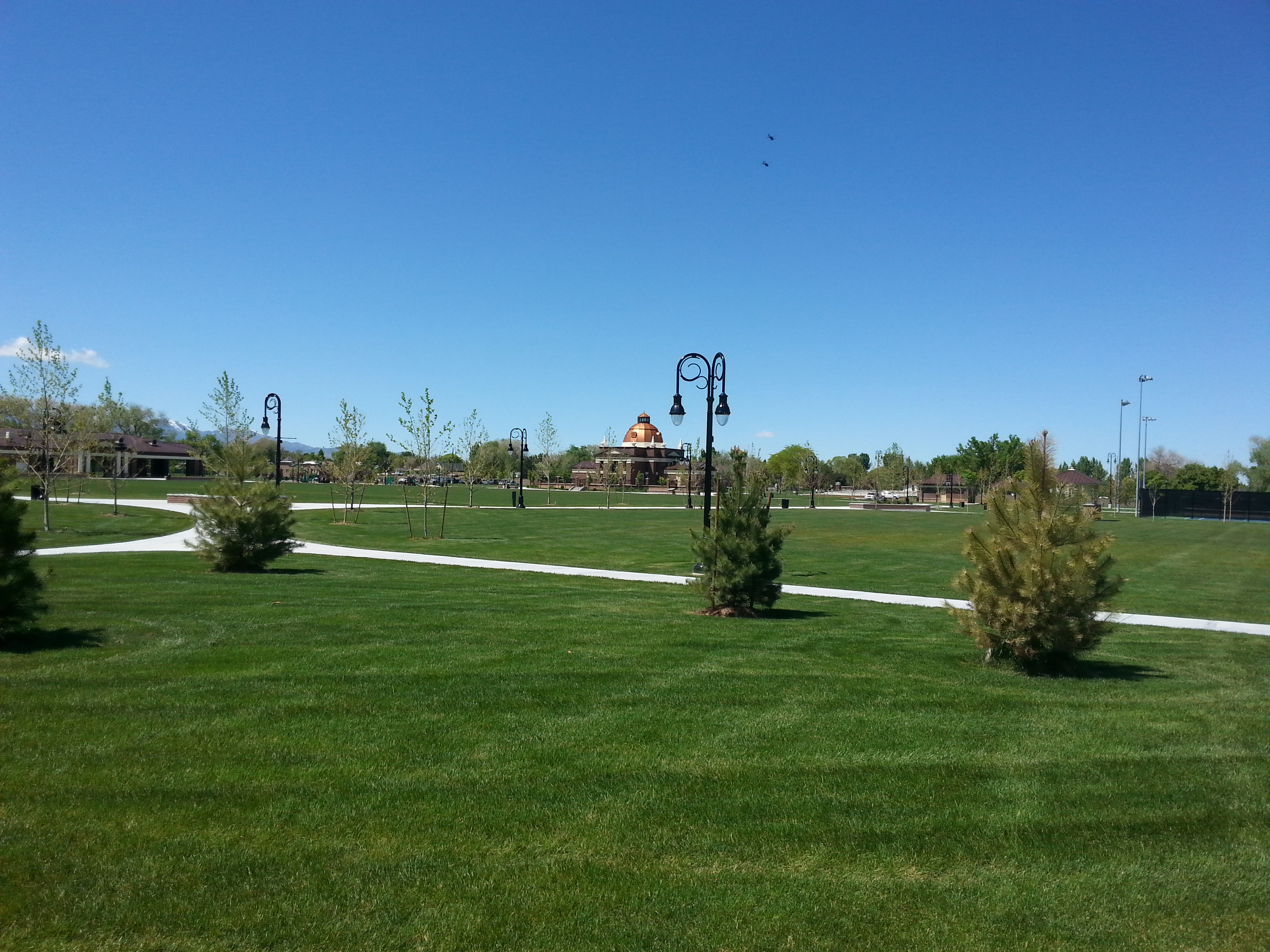
A photo of Riverton City Park.

During this time a new City Hall was constructed at the edge of the Riverton City Park at 12800 South and 1400 West. In 1996 the city purchased the old Riverton Elementary School and its surrounding 9 acres (3.6 ha) of land from the Jordan School District for $225,000. The city initially put a ballot measure out to fund the school through a general revenue bond, but the measure failed to gain support because it would have raised property taxes for residents of Riverton. Instead the city put together a multi-year plan to convert the old school house to the Riverton Community Center, and some of the land was sold to the County Library System for a new, state of the art library. By 2005–06, the city had successfully renovated the old elementary School into a new Community Center and City Hall, which now houses all of the city's administrative offices.

The often contentious city boundaries were in flux between the time of incorporation until the year 2000. At incorporation the boundaries were set from the Jordan River westward to what is now known as the coordinates of 3600 West, and from 11800 South to approximately 13800 South. In 1970, the town of Bluffdale was incorporated, taking in all of the land between 13800 South, southward to the Salt Lake/Utah County Line. 1982 saw the incorporation of the city of Draper, a town once situated at the south-east end of the Salt Lake Valley, their incorporated boundaries, uncontested by Riverton, took all of the area eastward from the Jordan River to the I-15 freeway, an area that was once "loosely" considered or referred to as Riverton or "Riverton Siding." In 1996 the city boundaries grew, virtually doubling the physical size of the city, through the annexation of land between Riverton and what was then known as the town of Herriman (now an incorporated city), extending its boundaries from 3600 West to roughly 4800 West, and to 5600 West from 13400 South to 14200 South and points southward beyond the city limits of Bluffdale. Included in the 1996 annexation was the “Foothills” development which had previously been annexed into Riverton during the 1980s, and then later de-annexed after the original developer filed for bankruptcy. The final solidification of Riverton's boundaries came when the city of Herriman incorporated in 2000, halting any possible further expansion westward by Riverton.

== Geography ==
Riverton shares city borders with South Jordan to the north, Draper to the east, Bluffdale to the south, and Herriman to the west. According to the United States Census Bureau, the city has a total area of 12.6 square miles (33 km^{2}), all land. The city is located in the southwestern corner of the Salt Lake Valley about twenty miles (32 km) south and slightly west of Salt Lake City. Riverton receives an average of 15.76 inches (400 mm) in precipitation each year. Snow can be seen in the winter, while during the summer temperatures occasionally break 100 °F (38 °C). Riverton has grown rapidly in the last few years, transforming it from a rural farming town into a suburban city.

== Governance ==
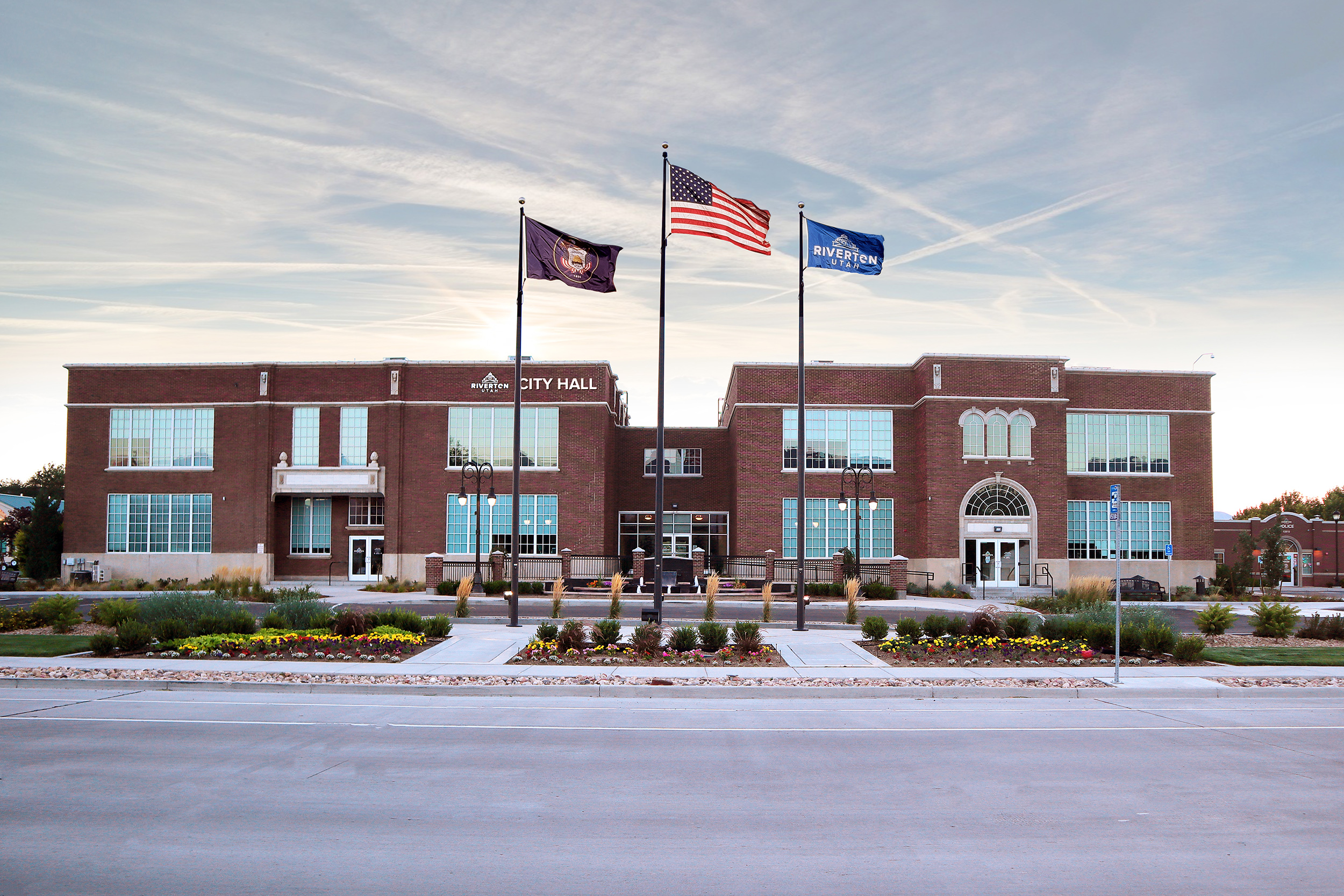
Riverton City Hall

Riverton City is a city of the 3rd class as defined by Utah Code. Riverton City operates under a “six-member council" form of government, which means there are six elected officials that make up the governing body: a mayor and five council members. Riverton's council members each represent a distinct geographical district and the mayor represents the city at large.

The city council has delegated the operational and day-to-day responsibilities of managing the city, its employees and services to a professional, full-time city manager. The city manager oversees all city departments and reports directly to the mayor and city council.

== Education ==
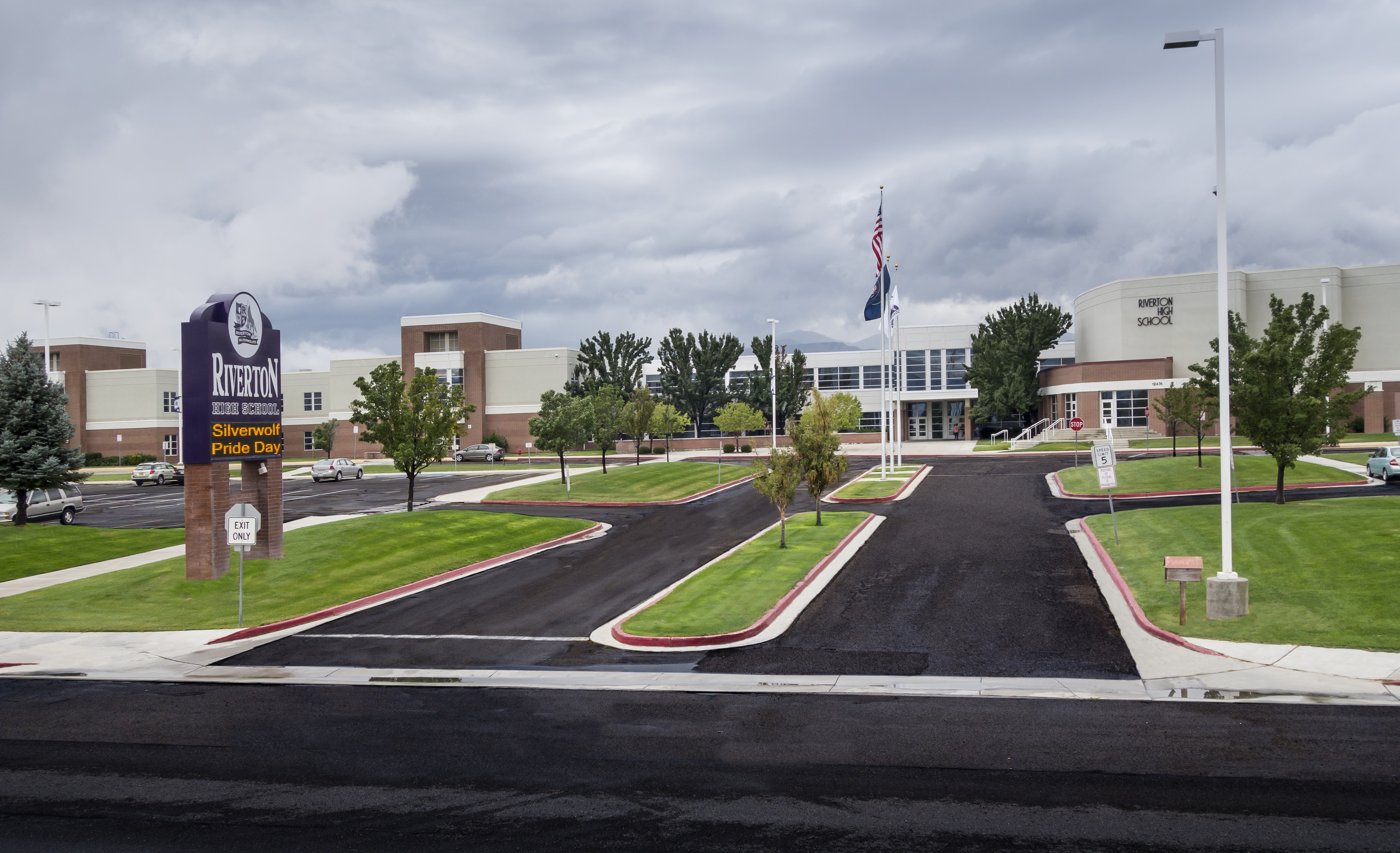
Riverton High School

Public education in Riverton is provided by the Jordan School District, one of the largest school districts in Utah.

Elementary Schools: Foothills Elementary, Midas Creek Elementary, Riverton Elementary, Rosamond Elementary, Rose Creek Elementary, Southland Elementary

Middle Schools: Oquirrh Hills Middle School, South Hills Middle School

High School: Riverton High School

Kauri Sue Hamilton School for students with special needs, Jordan Academy for Technology and Careers (JATC) south campus, and Saint Andrew Catholic School are also located in the community.

Many students from Riverton attend schools in Bluffdale, Herriman and South Jordan, as school boundaries do not coincide with city boundaries.

== Hospital ==
The Intermountain Riverton Hospital, funded and operated by Intermountain Health, opened in November 2009. The hospital serves the fastest growing portion of the Salt Lake Valley with surrounding cities of Riverton, Herriman, Bluffdale, and South Jordan. The hospital also provides services to cities in northern Utah County. Services include a complete inpatient and outpatient care center, a 24-hour emergency department, a state-of-the-art women's center, a surgical center, radiology, laboratory, pharmacy, physical therapy, 40 physician offices, and a helicopter pad. Perhaps the most notable service the hospital features is the children's outpatient center run by Primary Children's Medical Center. The design of the hospital allows it to expand as the southwest part of the valley continues to see rapid growth.

== Transportation ==
Riverton provides easy-access to Bangerter Highway, Mountain View Corridor, and Redwood Road; as all pass directly through the city. The city is also easily accessible from Interstate 15 via the 12300 S or Bangerter Highway exits.

In April 2025, the Utah Transit Authority opened a new bus route serving Riverton. This route, named Route 126, primarily travels along 12600 S with buses coming hourly.

== Demographics ==
Historical population
Census	Pop.	Note	%±
1950	1,666		—
1960	1,993		19.6%
1970	2,820		41.5%
1980	7,032		149.4%
1990	11,261		60.1%
2000	25,011		122.1%
2010	38,753		54.9%
2020	45,285		16.9%
U.S. Decennial Census

=== 2020 census ===
As of the 2020 census, Riverton had a population of 45,285. The median age was 31.9 years. 32.5% of residents were under the age of 18 and 8.9% of residents were 65 years of age or older. For every 100 females there were 100.5 males, and for every 100 females age 18 and over there were 97.8 males age 18 and over.

100.0% of residents lived in urban areas, while 0.0% lived in rural areas.

There were 12,794 households in Riverton, of which 50.5% had children under the age of 18 living in them. Of all households, 73.7% were married-couple households, 9.0% were households with a male householder and no spouse or partner present, and 13.8% were households with a female householder and no spouse or partner present. About 10.2% of all households were made up of individuals and 3.9% had someone living alone who was 65 years of age or older.

There were 13,101 housing units, of which 2.3% were vacant. The homeowner vacancy rate was 0.3% and the rental vacancy rate was 5.3%.

Racial composition as of the 2020 census
Race	Number	Percent
White	39,182	86.5%
Black or African American	306	0.7%
American Indian and Alaska Native	199	0.4%
Asian	1,083	2.4%
Native Hawaiian and Other Pacific Islander	375	0.8%
Two or more races	2,913	6.4%
Hispanic or Latino (of any race)	3,583	7.9%
Some other race	1,227	2.7%
