= Utah Transportation Commission =

The Utah Transportation Commission serves as an independent transportation advisory committee within the State of Utah, United States. In cooperation with the Utah Department of Transportation (UDOT) and municipal planning organizations (MPOs), the commission decides how available transportation funds are spent by prioritizing transportation projects within the state.

The commission is governed by Utah state law and has of seven members: one representing each of UDOT's four administrative regions and three at-large members. Members of the commission are appointed by the governor.
