= Utah Department of Transportation =

Utah State Department

Utah Department of Transportation (UDOT)
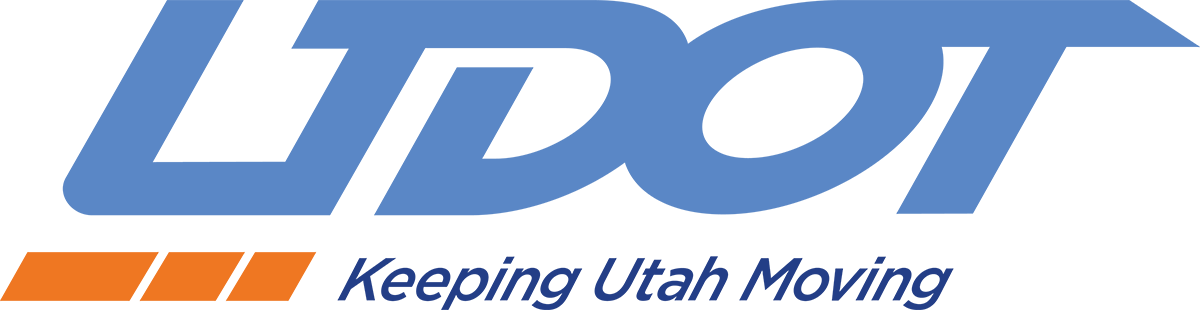

Agency overview
- Formed: July 1, 1975; 51 years ago
- Preceding agency: State Road Commission of Utah
- Jurisdiction: State of Utah
- Headquarters: Taylorsville, Utah
- Employees: 1,787
- Agency executives: Carlos Braceras, Executive Director; Lisa Wilson, Deputy Director, Engineering and Operations; Ben Huot, Deputy Director, Planning and Investment
- Parent agency: State of Utah
- Website: udot.utah.gov

The Utah Department of Transportation (UDOT) is an agency of the state government of Utah, United States; it is usually referred to by its initials UDOT (pronounced "you-dot"). UDOT is responsible for approximately 5,900 miles (9,495 kilometers) of state highways in Utah. UDOT's purview extends to other transportation sectors including:

- aeronautics,
- paved trails,
- transit,
- rail,
- amusement park ride safety,
- motor carriers and ports of entry, and
- nautical.

UDOT has three executive leaders. The executive director is Carlos Braceras with Lisa Wilson and Ben Huot as deputy directors. Project priorities are set forth by the independent Utah Transportation Commission, which coordinates directly with the UDOT. UDOT's three strategic goals include: Zero Fatalities, Optimize Mobility, and Preserve Infrastructure. UDOT's jurisdiction, regulations, and service responsibilities are governed by Utah state law.

== Structure ==
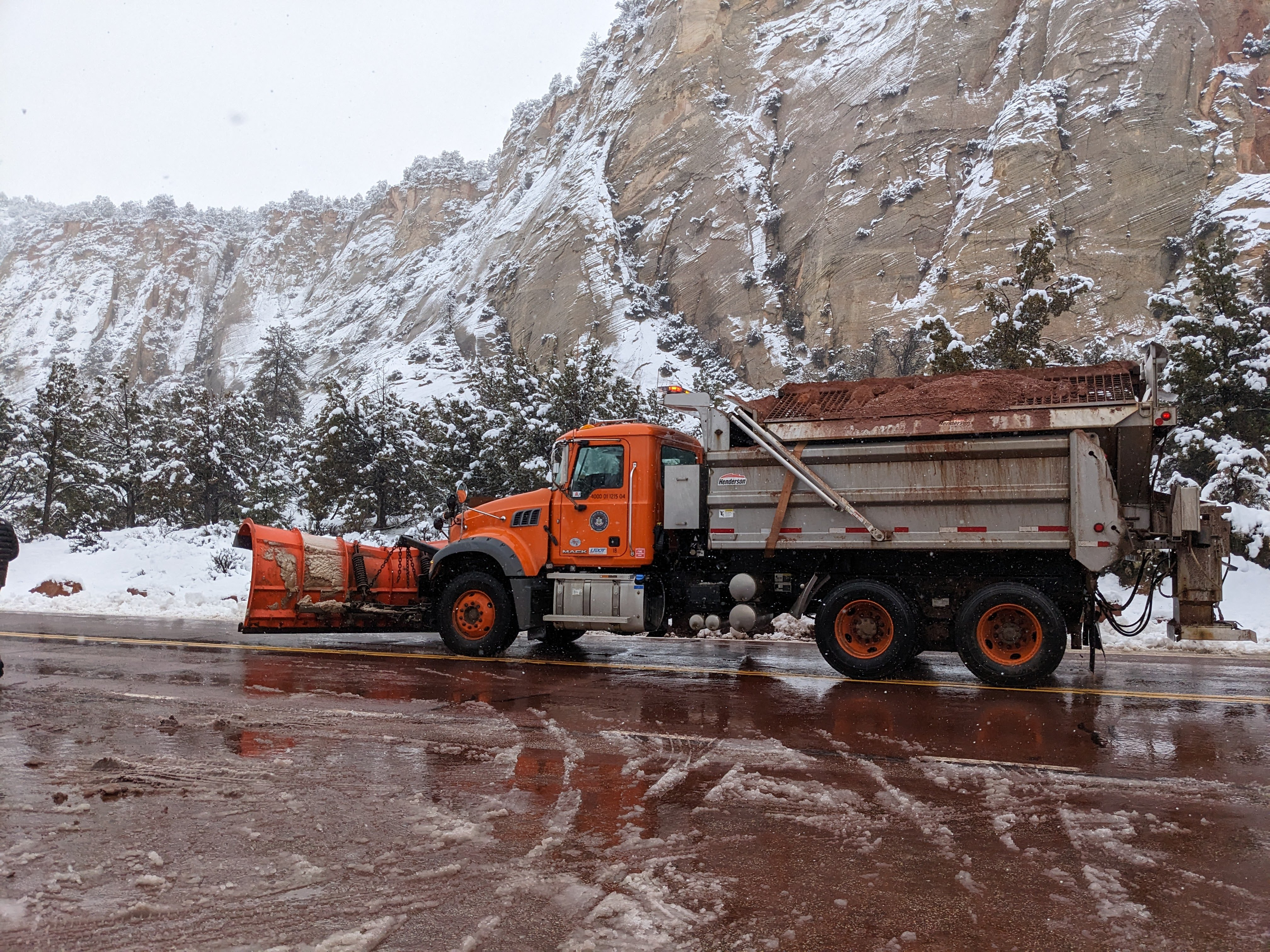
A UDOT Snowplow at the east entrance to Zion National Park.

The agency is headquartered in the Calvin L. Rampton State Office Complex in Taylorsville, Utah. and employs approximately 1,800 people across the state. The department is divided into 10 functional groups: Project Development, Operations, Program Development, Transit and Trails, Technology and Innovation, Employee Development, Communications, Policy and Legislative Services, Audit, and Finance. The agency has 88 maintenance stations throughout the state which are grouped into four administrative regions.

Utah Department of Transportation Regions
Region	Headquarters	Area	Ref.
One	Ogden	Box Elder, Cache, Davis, Morgan, Rich, and Weber counties	
Two	Salt Lake City	Salt Lake, Summit, and Tooele counties	
Three	Orem	Daggett, Duchesne, Juab, Uintah, Utah (except SR-96 and a portion of US-6), and Wasatch counties	
Four	Richfield	Beaver, Carbon, Emery, Garfield, Grand, Iron, Kane, Millard, Piute, San Juan, Sanpete, Sevier, Washington, and Wayne counties, as well as a small portion of Utah County	

== History ==
Originally, the State Road Commission of Utah, created in 1909, was responsible for maintenance, but these duties were rolled into the new Department of Transportation effective July 1, 1975.

== See also ==
- List of state highways in Utah
- U.S. Department of Transportation
