= Dog Lake =

Dog Lake can refer to:

== Canada ==
- Dog Lake (Ontario), Kaministiquia River, Thunder Bay District
- Dog Lake (Lessard Township, Algoma District)
- Dog Lake (Noonan Lake, Kenora District)
- Dog Lake (Severn River, Kenora District)
- Dog Lake (Yesno Township, Thunder Bay District)
- Dog Lake (Lennox and Addington County)
- Dog Lake (Nipissing District)
- Dog Lake (North Frontenac)
- Dog Lake (Dog Creek, Kenora District)
- Dog Lake (Keys Lake, Kenora District)
- Dog Lake (Riggs Township, Algoma District)
- Dog Lake (South Frontenac)
- Dog Lake (Parry Sound District)
- Dog Lake (Central Frontenac)
- Dog Lake (British Columbia), Okanagan Valley, British Columbia
- Dog Lake (Manitoba), Interlake Region, Manitoba

== United States ==
- Dog Lake (Minnesota) in Le Sueur County, Minnesota
- Dog Lake (California), in Yosemite National Park near Tuolumne Meadows
- Dog Lake (Brighton, Utah), in Salt Lake County, Utah near Brighton
- Dog Lake (Mount Aire, Utah), in Salt Lake County, Utah between Millcreek Canyon and Big Cottonwood Canyon
