= Olympus Hills Shopping Center =

Shopping mall in Salt Lake City, Utah

Coordinates: 40.6858°N 111.7942°W

Olympus Hills Shopping Center in 2026

Olympus Hills Shopping Center, located at 3900 Wasatch Blvd, Millcreek, Utah, was established in 1963, and is named after the mountain to the East. It sits within the Olympus Cove in Millcreek, Utah.

== History ==
Olympus Hills has been home to many different stores over the years, but the most memorable was Smith's Food and Drug (aka Smith's Food King). Smith's had leased the shopping center's largest space and was the key tenant. Then unexpectedly Smith's decided to use the facilities as storage only, leading to a long lawsuit between Olympus Hills Shopping Center and Smith's. The long drawn-out fight took several years to sort out.

In 2004 the Shopping Center was put back on the hot seat, as a billboard was erected directly in front of the shopping center at a small gas station owned by another party.
