= Mount Olympus, Utah =

Mount Olympus
- Former CDP
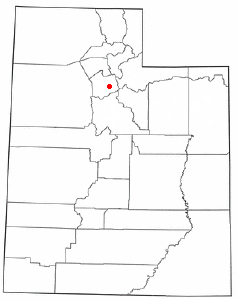
- Location of Mount Olympus, Utah
- Coordinates: 40°41′3″N 111°47′32″W
- Country: United States
- State: Utah
- County: Salt Lake

Area
  - Total: 3.4 sq mi (8.8 km^{2})
  - Land: 3.4 sq mi (8.8 km^{2})
  - Water: 0 sq mi (0.0 km^{2})
- Elevation: 5,120 ft (1,560 m)

Population (2000)
  - Total: 7,103
  - Density: 2,097/sq mi (809.8/km^{2})
- Time zone: UTC-7 (Mountain (MST))
  - Summer (DST): UTC-6 (MDT)
- Area codes: 385, 801
- FIPS code: 49-52900
- GNIS feature ID: 1867580

Mount Olympus or Olympus Cove is a neighborhood in Millcreek, Utah built on the northwestern slopes of Mount Olympus of the Wasatch Range. It was formerly a census-designated place (CDP), but was consolidated into the Millcreek CDP for census purposes in 2010. Millcreek incorporated as a city in 2016. The commercial center of the neighborhood is the relatively flat area south of the crossing of Mill Creek by Interstate 215, which includes the Olympus Hills Shopping Center, Oakridge Elementary School, Wasatch Junior High (One of the finest Junior High Schools in Utah, with the best Music Program), Skyline High School, a trailhead for non-motorized access to Mill Creek Canyon, and a Utah Transit Authority park and ride lot. As of the 2000 census, the CDP population was 7,103, a slight decrease from the 1990 figure of 7,413.

== Geography ==
According to the United States Census Bureau, the CDP had a total area of 3.4 square miles (8.8 km^{2}), all of it land.

== Demographics ==
Historical population
Census	Pop.	Note	%±
1970	5,909		—
1980	6,068		2.7%
1990	7,413		22.2%
2000	7,103		−4.2%

As of the census of 2000, there were 7,103 people, 2,575 households, and 2,065 families residing in the CDP. The population density was 2,097.3 people per square mile (809.0/km^{2}). There were 2,673 housing units at an average density of 789.3/sq mi (304.4/km^{2}). The racial makeup of the CDP was 94.61% White, 0.21% African American, 0.18% Native American, 3.11% Asian, 0.03% Pacific Islander, 0.41% from other races, and 1.45% from two or more races. Hispanic or Latino of any race were 1.77% of the population.

There were 2,575 households, out of which 31.0% had children under the age of 18 living with them, 72.2% were married couples living together, 5.6% had a female householder with no husband present, and 19.8% were non-families. 15.9% of all households were made up of individuals, and 8.4% had someone living alone who was 65 years of age or older. The average household size was 2.76 and the average family size was 3.09.

In the CDP, the population was spread out, with 24.0% under the age of 18, 6.4% from 18 to 24, 21.4% from 25 to 44, 27.9% from 45 to 64, and 20.3% who were 65 years of age or older. The median age was 44 years. For every 100 females, there were 101.4 males. For every 100 females age 18 and over, there were 96.6 males.

The median income for a household in the CDP was $84,684, and the median income for a family was $92,950. Males had a median income of $61,316 versus $41,447 for females. The per capita income for the CDP was $44,286. About 0.9% of families and 1.8% of the population were below the poverty line, including 1.2% of those under age 18 and 2.4% of those age 65 or over.
