= List of killings by law enforcement officers in the United States, February 2020 =

This is a list of people reported killed by non-military law enforcement officers in the United States in February 2020, whether in the line of duty or not, and regardless of reason or method. The listing documents the occurrence of a death, making no implications regarding wrongdoing or justification on the part of the person killed or officer involved. Killings are arranged by date of the incident that caused death. Different death dates, if known, are noted in the description. The table below lists 93 people.

== February 2020 ==
Date	Name (age) of deceased	Race	State (city)	Description
2020-02-29	Stephen Douris (45)	White	Nevada (Henderson)	Officers responded to a domestic violence call and were confronted by 45-year-old Douris who was armed with a knife. After attempts to subdue him using non-lethal weapons failed, officers shot and killed him.
2020-02-29	Richard Rodriguez (45)	Hispanic	Texas (San Antonio)	Rodriguez was shot and killed by police.
2020-02-29	Anthony Taylor (49)	Black	Wisconsin (Milwaukee)	Taylor was shot and killed by police.
2020-02-29	Antonio Valenzuela (40)	Hispanic	New Mexico (Las Cruces)	Officers pulled over 40-year old Valenzuela on a warrant for parole violation. Valenzuela attempted to flee, which led to a foot chase during which Tasers were twice deployed unsuccessfully. After catching up to him, a struggle ensued during which one of the officers is heard saying "I'm going to (expletive) choke you out". The officer "knelt down on his neck until he became unresponsive" after which paramedics were called in an attempt to revive him, but he was pronounced dead at the scene.
2020-02-29	Ian Wilson (31)	White	North Carolina (Mocksville)	
2020-02-29	Abigail Cohen (22)	White	Missouri (Sikeston)	
2020-02-28	Jose L. Rivera (22)	Hispanic	Washington (Moses Lake)	Rivera was shot and killed by police.
2020-02-27	Dorgel Cisnero-Mesa (39)	Hispanic	Florida (Jacksonville)	Cisnero-Mesa was shot and killed by police.
2020-02-27	Kent Richard Kruger (36)	White	Minnesota (Lakeville)	Kruger was shot and killed by police.
2020-02-27	Joshua David Hernandez Lord (33)	Hispanic	Arizona (Clarkdale)	Lord was shot and killed by police.
2020-02-27	Cecil Dewayne Truelove (43)	White	Florida (Bradenton)	
2020-02-27	Desmond Hayes (28)	Black	Colorado (Colorado Springs)	
2020-02-26	Ramiro Carrasco (30)	Hispanic	Colorado (Greeley)	A police officer on patrol spotted a suspicious vehicle and approached it on foot for further investigation. Upon closer inspection of the vehicle, he realized it contained two occupants, one of them armed with a handgun. The officer gave repeated warnings for Carrasco to keep his hands away from the weapon and was shot and killed when he grabbed it and began rotating it towards the officer.
2020-02-26	David William Irving (35)	Unknown	Missouri (Kansas City)	Irving was shot and killed by FBI agents.
2020-02-26	William Resto (54)	Unknown	Ohio (Sylvania Township)	Resto was shot and killed by police.
2020-02-26	Justin Lee Stackhouse (30)	Black	Florida (Bradenton)	Stackhouse was shot and killed by police.
2020-02-26	James "Thomson" "Jimbo" Thompson (30)	White	Oklahoma (Tahlequah)	Thomson was shot and killed by police.
2020-02-26	Unnamed person	Unknown race	California (Garden Grove)	
2020-02-25	Dylan John Olmeda (16)	White	Texas (Georgetown)	
2020-02-25	Unnamed person	Unknown race	California (Brea)	
2020-02-25	Matthew Felix (19)	Black	New York (Queens)	Felix was shot and killed by police.
2020-02-25	Terry Hasty (56)	Unknown	South Carolina (Dalzell)	Hasty was shot and killed by police.
2020-02-25	Neal Stuart Nevada (23)	Native American	Idaho (Pocatello)	Nevada was shot and killed by police.
2020-02-25	Kenneth Sashington (38)	Black	Alabama (Tuscumbia)	Sashington was shot and killed by police.
2020-02-25	SanJuan Migayle Thomas (39)	Hispanic	Louisiana (Shreveport)	Thomas was shot and killed by police.
2020-02-25	Reginald “Reggie” Damone Payne (48)	Black	California (Sacramento)	
2020-02-24	Lucas Alvarado (27)	Hispanic	Wisconsin (Milwaukee)	Responding to a call of shots being fired, two officers spotted an individual they believed to be the suspect walking away. Police say the man ran, ignored commands to stop, and then confronted officers with a gun, which the officers responded by shooting and killing him. The deceased man was later identified as 27-year-old Lucas Alvarado.
2020-02-24	Stephen O'Brien (20)	White	Texas (Floresville)	O'Brien was shot and killed by police.
2020-02-24	Print Zutavern (28)	White	Nebraska (Arnold)	Zutavern was shot and killed by police.
2020-02-23	Boyce Melvin Thayer (83)	Unknown	North Carolina (Jamestown)	Thayer was shot and killed by police.
2020-02-22	Rodrigo Aguirre (36)	Hispanic	New Mexico (Deming)	Aguirre was shot and killed by police.
2020-02-22	Adam Gamrak Jr. (38)	White	Pennsylvania (Schuylkill Haven)	
2020-02-21	Joseph Krebs	White	Missouri (De Soto)	
2020-02-21	Manuel Arebalo (40)	Hispanic	Colorado (Arvada)	Arebalo was shot and killed by police.
2020-02-21	John James Monahan Jr. (26)		Georgia (Lake Lanier)	Monahan was shot and killed by police.
2020-02-21	Lindy Bolie	Unknown race	Arizona (Phoenix)	
2020-02-20	Thomas Edward Zeller (61)	Unknown race	Pennsylvania (Doylestown)	
2020-02-20	Roger Nordberg (87)	Unknown race	Idaho (Caldwell)	
2020-02-20	Luis Ramirez (22)	Hispanic	California (Long Beach)	
2020-02-20	John Daniel Dixon (75)	White	Georgia (DeKalb County)	Dixon was shot and killed by police.
2020-02-20	Joseph Jewell (17)	Black	Ohio (Columbus)	Jewell was shot and killed by police.
2020-02-19	Alex Francisco Vazquez (38)	Hispanic	California (Red Bluff)	Vazquez was shot and killed by police.
2020-02-18	Matthew D. Saunders (41)	White	North Carolina (Hickory)	
2020-02-18	Kevin Adolphe (22)	Black	Florida (Orlando)	Adolphe was shot and killed by police.
2020-02-17	Jeremy Dewey (27)	Native American	Arizona (Pinetop)	Dewey was shot and killed by police.
2020-02-17	Travis Mullins (29)	White	Tennessee (Greenville)	Mullins was shot and killed by police.
2020-02-16	Rudy Arenas (40)	Hispanic	Florida (Poinciana)	Arenas was shot and killed by police.
2020-02-16	Kerry Michael Bounsom (33)	Asian	California (Long Beach)	Some officers were working as part of a violent crime task force when they tried to stop Bounsom, who was on a bicycle, and he attempted to flee. Bounsom was uncooperative so officers attempted to use a taser, to which Bounsom responded by pulling out a gun. One of the officers fired at least one shot at Bounsom. He was subdued and taken to hospital where he later died.
2020-02-16	Brandon Lewis (31)	White	Indiana (Corydon)	Lewis was shot and killed by police.
2020-02-16	Thomas Murray (31)	White	Massachusetts (Newbury)	Murray was shot and killed by police.
2020-02-16	Lufilufilimalelei "Daelyn" Polu (16)	Native Hawaiian or Pacific Islander	Alaska (Anchorage)	Polu was shot and killed by police.
2020-02-14	William Bluestone (21)	Hispanic	Oregon (Silverton)	Bluestone was shot and killed by police.
2020-02-14	Christopher Gutierrez (44)	Hispanic	California (Rialto)	Gutierrez was shot and killed by police.
2020-02-14	Timothy L. Harrington (58)	White	North Carolina (Polkton)	Harrington was shot and killed by police.
2020-02-14	David Heeke (63)	White	Colorado (Commerce City)	Heeke died in an exchange of gunfire with police officers after a vehicle chase.
2020-02-13	Dakota Lee Chlarson (25)	Native American	North Dakota (Dickinson)	Chlarson was shot and killed by police.
2020-02-13	Brian F. Filion (41)	White	Utah (Salt Lake City)	Filion was shot and killed by police.
2020-02-13	Abel Lopez-Lopez (37)	Hispanic	Nevada (Sparks)	Lopez-Lopez was shot and killed by police.
2020-02-13	Aaron M. Valdez (19)	Hispanic	Texas (Amarillo)	Valdez was shot and killed by police.
2020-02-12	Jeremy Fox (42)	White	Louisiana (Bossier City)	Fox was shot and killed by police.
2020-02-12	Dewayne B. Bowman (30)	White	Texas (Arlington)	
2020-02-12	Hans Alejandro Huitz (51)	Native American	Virginia (Virginia Beach)	Huitz was shot and killed by police.
2020-02-12	Michael Marullo (33)	White	Maryland (Baltimore)	Marullo was shot and killed by police.
2020-02-10	Jeremy Todd Baham (40)	White	Louisiana (Lafayette)	Baham was shot and killed by police.
2020-02-10	Thomas Ray Chamblee (34)	White	Alabama (Albertville)	Chamblee was shot and killed by police.
2020-02-10	Bobby Gibbs (40)	Black	Arkansas (Forrest City)	Gibbs was shot and killed by police.
2020-02-09	Zane G. Blaisdell (48)	White	Michigan (Saginaw)	Blaisdell was shot and killed by police.
2020-02-09	Jeremy Grayson (31)	Black	Illinois (Chicago)	Grayson was shot and killed by police.
2020-02-09	Michael Leatherwood (47)	White	Georgia (Byron)	Leatherwood was shot and killed by police.
2020-02-09	Erik Robinson (23)	Unknown	Florida (Orange County)	Robinson was shot and killed by police.
2020-02-09	Gordon Whitaker (45)	White	Washington (Kennewick)	Whitaker was shot and killed by police.
2020-02-08	Douglas Harold Hart (67)	White	Alabama (Vestavia Hills)	Hart was shot and killed by police.
2020-02-08	Timothy DeBella (46)	White	Missouri (Cuba)	
2020-02-07	Michael Collins (38)	White	Oklahoma (Sapulpa)	Collins was shot and killed by police.
2020-02-07	Joshua Downing (37)	Unknown	Missouri (Kansas City)	Police officers responded to a call of an armed man in a residential neighborhood, finding 37-year-old Joshua Downing when they arrived, wielding a rifle. After refusing to yield to verbal commands and bean bag rounds he was shot and killed when he pointed the rifle at officers.
2020-02-07	Juston Root (41)	White	Massachusetts (Brookline)	Root was shot and killed by police.
2020-02-06	Sean Patrick Constance (37)	White	Florida (Port Charlotte)	Constance was shot and killed by police.
2020-02-05	Daniel Murillo (56)	White	Nevada (Washoe)	Murillo was shot and killed by police.
2020-02-05	Gaston A. Nava-Saucedo (33)	Hispanic	Kansas (Topeka)	Nava-Saucedo was shot and killed by police.
2020-02-04	Dominique Antwon Anderson (27)	Black	California (Home Garden)	Anderson was shot and killed by police.
2020-02-04	Thomas Barbosa (41)	White	California (Ono)	Barbosa was shot and killed by police.
2020-02-04	Lionel Morris (39)	Black	Arkansas (Conway)	Police were called to a store after receiving a call about two people removing a drone from its packaging. Police chased Morris through the store, before tackling him. Morris was tased "nearly 40 times" and was forced onto the ground by police. Bodycam footage shows Morris saying "I can't breathe", to which one of the officers responds "If you can talk, you can breathe."
2020-02-04	Darius Tarver (23)		Texas (Denton)	Tarver was shot and killed by police.
2020-02-04	Shawn Michael Taylor (33)	White	Oklahoma (Allen)	Taylor was shot and killed by police.
2020-02-03	Amanda Perrault (44)	White	Georgia (Eatonton)	
2020-02-03	Marc Dominic Neal (56)	Black	Utah (Millcreek)	Neal was shot and killed by police.
2020-02-03	Carl Grant (69)	Black	Alabama (Birmingham)	
2020-02-02	Chris Cadotte (63)	Unknown	Arizona (Yuma)	Cadotte was shot and killed by police.
2020-02-02	Alvin Cole (17)	Black	Wisconsin (Wauwatosa)	Cole was shot and killed by police. The same officer who shot and killed Alvin Cole was involved in the fatal shooting of Antonio Gonzales in 2015.
2020-02-02	Jason Gora (44)	White	Maine (Minot)	Gora was shot and killed by police.
2020-02-01	Vincent Conti (24)	White	Florida (Spring Hill)	Conti was shot and killed by police.
2020-02-01	Ronnell Mouzon (41)	Black	Florida (Fort Myers)	Mouzon was shot and killed by police.
2020-02-01	Leonard Parker Jr. (53)	Black	Mississippi (Gulfport)	Parker was shot and killed by police.

== See also ==
- Death in custody § United States
- Henry A. Wallace Police Crime Public Database
- List of cases of police brutality
- List of countries with annual rates and counts for killings by law enforcement officers
- List of law enforcement officers killed in the line of duty in the United States
- List of law enforcement officers convicted for an on-duty killing in the United States
- List of shootings by US immigration agents
- List of police reforms related to the George Floyd protests
- List of unarmed African Americans killed by law enforcement officers in the United States
- Lists of killings by law enforcement officers
- Police brutality in the United States
- Police misconduct § United States
- Police riot § United States
- Police use of deadly force in the United States
