= Nathaniel Baldwin =

American inventor and industrialist (1878–1961)

Nathaniel Baldwin (December 1, 1878 – January 19, 1961) was an American inventor and industrialist, known for his improved telephonic earphone, among other inventions. He was also a supporter of the early Mormon fundamentalist movement.

== Biography ==
Nathaniel Baldwin was born in Fillmore, Millard County, Utah to Nathaniel B. Baldwin, a native of Ontario, Canada, and Margaret Oler, a native of Philadelphia. Baldwin's family were members of the Church of Jesus Christ of Latter-day Saints (LDS Church) and his mother was his father's second polygamous wife. As a child, he was interested in technology and built his own bicycle and steam engine.

== Teaching ==
Baldwin studied at Brigham Young Academy (BYA), Utah State Agricultural College, and then Stanford University, receiving a degree in electrical engineering. He then returned to BYA to teach physics and theology and remained after its name changed to Brigham Young University (BYU). Though the LDS Church had officially discontinued the practice of polygamy in 1890, and again in 1904, fellow professor John Tanner Clark convinced Baldwin the church was making a mistake. Since the LDS Church owned BYU, this led to Baldwin's firing and Clark's excommunication in 1905.

=== Inventing and business ===
Baldwin worked at remote hydroelectric plants at the Snake Creek near Heber City and in East Mill Creek Canyon. He was also an electrician and air compressor operator while he experimented with sound amplification using compressed air. He used an idea for a telephonic feature to invent a more sensitive telephonic receiver in 1910, and later after surpassing testing standards, sold production versions on contract to the U.S. Navy. His first ones were made by hand in his kitchen and, despite the Navy's suggestion, never patented the headset assembly because he considered their invention "trivial." The earpieces were themselves patented, first in 1910, and then improved versions in 1915. "Headphones", two telephonic receivers on a headbow, were already in use by early wireless radio operators as early as 1906-1907, prior to Baldwin's telephonic receiver improvement and patent in 1910.

In 1914, Baldwin started a business in East Millcreek, Utah called The Baldwin Radio Company. He powered the plant and the neighborhood through a hydroelectric generator which he made out of bicycle wheels and piano wire. The company peaked at 150 employees and $2 million in annual sales in the 1920s. One legend tells that Philo Farnsworth built his first television in Baldwin's factory.

=== Mormon fundamentalism and company bankruptcy ===
Baldwin used his success to help support the post-Manifesto polygamous movement in the 1920s, as he felt a religious duty to help those trying to preserve "Old Fashioned Mormonism." Baldwin had been attending fundamentalist functions since 1921, and was excommunicated by the LDS church in 1922 for "insubordination" regarding his support for plural marriage. Many officers in his company were leading polygamists, including Lorin C. Woolley, John Y. Barlow, Israel Barlow, Leslie Broadbent, and Lyman Jessop. In fact, it has been estimated that 10-20% of his employees were either from polygamist families or were supporters of the doctrine. Baldwin's factory facilitated the introduction of Lorin Woolley and his father John W. Woolley to the Jessop family, and these employees, among others, drew up plans to create the Fundamentalist Church of Jesus Christ of Latter Day Saints (FLDS Church) in southern Utah. He also contributed $750 to the printing of five-thousand copies of The One Mighty and Strong by John T. Clark. All in all, Baldwin has been considered the most important financial support to the Mormon fundamentalist community before his company failed.

Unwise investments, often with fellow supporters of polygamy, led to Baldwin's company's bankruptcy in 1924.

In a new business venture with his polygamous friends, Baldwin began selling stock for the Omega Investment Company, which led to his conviction for mail fraud in 1930 and two-year sentence at McNeil Island Federal Prison. After this period, Baldwin was never again able to recapture his previous success.

Despite his doctrinal support of polygamy, he married only once, to Elizabeth Ann Butler. They were the parents of seven children.
