= Mary Lee Pugh Hope =

Mary Lee Pugh Hope (1902 – 1973) was an early African-American member of The Church of Jesus Christ of Latter-Day Saints (LDS Church).

== Early life ==
Mary Lee Pugh was born in Alabama in 1902. She received a fourth-grade education. She joined the Baptist Church at 11 years old, though she often expressed dissatisfaction with the Baptist Church and questioned its doctrines. In response to her questions, her pastor (her father's brother) encouraged her father to whip her. Despite this abuse, she prayed and lived consistently with Baptist teachings.

Pugh became engaged to Len Hope at the age of 17. Hope was a member of the LDS Church, which drew criticism from Pugh's uncle. They were married in 1920, and Mary was baptized into the LDS Church in 1925.

== Life in the LDS Church ==
As part of the African-American Great Migration to northern cities, the Hopes moved to Sycamore, Ohio by 1930. They owned their own home in Lincoln Heights by 1940. Though the Hopes were not barred from attending church meetings at the LDS Cincinnati Branch, racial prejudice made them uncomfortable with attending with white members unless for special events. The Hopes held worship services at their own home once a month, and regularly provided refreshments.

The Hopes moved to Salt Lake County, Utah in 1951 because of Len's ailing health. They attended integrated services in the Mill Creek Stake. Len died in 1952.

== Death ==
After her husband's death, Hope moved to Philadelphia to be near some of her children. Suffering from health problems, she spent many of her last days in the University of Pennsylvania Hospital. She died in 1973.

Hope received a traditional LDS funeral as well as a Muslim service from her children. Her bishop in Philadelphia authorized church funds to have her body flown back to Salt Lake to be buried beside her husband in Elysian Burial Gardens in Mill Creek, Utah.

== Legacy ==
Mary and Len had at least four children. Their children became touring musicians in the Middle East, and many of them converted to Islam.

== See also ==
- Black people and Mormon priesthood
- Black people and Mormonism
