= List of killings by law enforcement officers in the United States, July 2015 =

This is a list of people reported killed by non-military law enforcement officers in the United States in July 2015, whether in the line of duty or not, and regardless of reason or method. The listing documents the occurrence of a death, making no implications regarding wrongdoing or justification on the part of the person killed or officer involved. Killings are arranged by date of the incident that caused death. Different death dates, if known, are noted in the description. The table below lists 128 people.

== July 2015 ==
Date	Name (Age) of Deceased	State (City)	Description
2015-07-31	Hatch, Jeremy (34)	New Mexico (Roswell)	Federal agents and officers from the Roswell Police Department and the Sheriff's Office involved in a drug investigation approached three men outside a Roswell restaurant. Hatch, in a vehicle, shot at the officers who returned fire, striking him thirteen times. One police officer, wearing a bulletproof vest, was shot in the abdomen. He was treated and released at a hospital. Two other men were arrested.
2015-07-31	Molina, Rafael, Jr. (33)	New Mexico (Albuquerque)	A witness told Albuquerque Police he saw a dispute where a man pushed a woman into a vehicle and drove away. Responding officers tried to stop Molina's vehicle. During the pursuit the woman jumped out. After the vehicle was stopped police say Molina ran from the car carrying a handgun. Police say when Molina raised the weapon two officers shot and killed him.
2015-07-31	Vallejo, Philip "Flip" (30)	Texas (Fort Worth)	Fort Worth Police officers patrolling on bicycles observed an altercation involving two groups of people. Police say one man had a weapon and officers ordered him to drop it. An officer says he fired when he believed Vallejo was about to shoot. Vallejo was taken to a hospital where he was pronounced dead. Fort Worth Attorney David Cantu said witness statements contradict the official report.
2015-07-30	Vrenon, Ryan Daniel (25)	California (Mount Shasta)	California Highway Patrol officers investigating a vehicle stopped on the side of Interstate 5. The officers saw a gun in the vehicle and the driver sped away. The vehicle was stopped sixteen miles away with spike strips and pulled into the center divider. As the officer approached the vehicle there was an exchange of gunfire and Vrenon was killed.
2015-07-30	Raiyawa, Filimoni (57)	California (San Francisco)	San Francisco Police officers were called to the scene of a traffic accident where Raiywawa had walked away. When officers found him nearby the 265-pound Raiwaya attacked them and walked away again. When several officers finally struggled with Raiyawa and got him into handcuffs he stopped breathing and died at the scene. Sonoma County officials say that Raiyawa was wanted for beating to death ninety-six year old Solomon Cohen, for whom he was a caretaker.
2015-07-30	Perkins, Mark (48)	Nevada (Gardnerville)	Douglas County Sheriff's deputies, including SWAT and Negotiations teams were preparing to arrest Perkins on charges including assault with a deadly weapon when he came out of his house armed with two weapons. Authorities say that when he pointed the weapons at the deputies six of them shot and killed him.
2015-07-29	Romero, Oscar Lotari (47)	California (Whittier)	Los Angeles County Sheriff Deputies responded to an 11 p.m. call about a family disturbance at a residence. The Department reported that when deputies arrived Romero, apparently drunk, attacked one the officers with a metal stick. The deputy who had been struck shot Romero and the other deputy used his Taser. Romero was declared dead at the scene.
2015-07-29	Malone, Michael (34)	New Mexico (Las Cruces)	Deputies from the Doña Ana County Sheriff's Office went to arrest Malone on charges related to an ongoing domestic violence investigation. When they tried to arrest him at a Las Cruces motel he climbed out the back window of his room and was confronted by deputies there. A Sheriff's Office spokesperson said he shot at deputies. Malone was shot and killed by Chase Thouvenell, a member of the special response team.
2015-07-29	Barker, Roger Darrin (53)	Utah (Logan)	Logan Police officers were called to the home of a man reported to be suicidal. Learning he was armed, the officers called in the SWAT team. There was a three-hour standoff with the man in his home. When Barker came out and shot at the officers a Cache County Sheriff deputy and a Logan Police officer shot and killed him.
2015-07-29	Delgado-Soba, Wilmer (38)	Massachusetts (Worcester)	When Delgado-Soba entered a convenience store market and began running around, knocking items off the shelf, officers from the Worcester Police Department called for an ambulance and tried to calm him down. When they could not talk Delgado-Soba down and he resisted their attempts to handcuff him, they shocked him with a stun gun. He was handcuffed and taken by ambulance but on the way to the hospital he fought with paramedics and showed medical distress. He died early the next day. One officer at the store talking to the police dispatcher had said, "..he's tweaking..."
2015-07-28	Johnson, Timothy (41)	Arkansas (Manila)	Officers from the Manila Police Department responded to a report of a disturbance at the camper where Johnson and his girlfriend lived. Johnson had a knife and when he advanced toward an officer instead of dropping the knife as ordered an officer shot and killed him.
2015-07-28	White, Allan F., III (23)	Tennessee (Cleveland)	White was killed by Bradley County Sheriff's deputy Tiffany Oakley after he "accosted" her outside her home. She attempted to arrest him and they struggled. Deputy Oakley used her Taser stun gun and then her pistol, shooting and killing him.
2015-07-27	Forgy, Samuel (22)	Colorado (Boulder)	Forgy was high on LSD and wielding a hammer in an apartment complex. As officers arrived, Forgy approached them and reportedly did not listen to demands to drop the hammer. At least one officer opened fire.
2015-07-27	Falgout, Jean Paul (45)	Louisiana (Houma)	Falgout was wanted for theft when his vehicle was spotted. After a twenty-mile pursuit he ran over officers' spike strips and was stopped. By that time his vehicle was surrounded by officers from Houma Police, Terrebonne Parish Sheriff's Office, and Louisiana State Police. Falgout got out of the vehicle brandishing a handgun and eventually pointing it in the direction of the officers. Eight of the officers shot and killed him. The weapon was a pellet gun. Authorities described the incident a "suicide by cop." Friends and family say Falgout had problems with drug addiction and had pledged to die rather than go back to prison.
2015-07-27	Milliken, Timothy (56)	South Carolina (Columbia)	Two deputies from the Lexington County Sheriff's Department called to the scene of a family disturbance found Milliken attacking a family member with a knife. The deputies shot and killed Milliken.
2015-07-26	Westly, Khari (33)	Louisiana (Shreveport)	Shreveport Police officers responded to a call from Westley's sister who said she and her cousin had been held hostage at gunpoint by Westley. Officers found Westley at a nearby intersection where he turned and shot at them. The four police officers fired twenty-five rounds, striking Westley four times, mortally wounding him.
2015-07-26	Hammond, Zachary (19)	South Carolina (Seneca)	Hammond was stopped by police during a drug sting while he was inside his car with female passenger in a Hardee's parking lot. According to police, Hammond drove his car towards the officer. The officer fired two shots through the driver's side window, striking Hammond in the shoulder and torso.
2015-07-25	Day, Brian Keith (36)	Nevada (Las Vegas)	Las Vegas Police officers were investigating a home invasion beating at the apartment adjoining Brian Keith Day's when Day came out to the balcony in front of the apartments. Officers say they told him to go back inside his apartment or to leave while they investigated the crime scene. He went into his apartment and came out with a pistol in his waistband. Refusing officers' orders to show his hands, Day shot one officer in the face with the pellet pistol. Three officers responded by firing fifty-nine rounds, striking Day twenty times, killing him.
2015-07-25	Olmsted, Christopher (60)	Louisiana (New Orleans)	Olmsted, whose family says had a mental illness and was skipping his medication, drove a pickup and struck a house and several other vehicles before he crashed and came to a stop. A New Orleans Police officer was in the area and approached Olmsted's vehicle. Authorities say Olmsted struck the officer and reached for the officer's gun before the officer shot and killed him.
2015-07-25	Jackson, Earl (59)	Florida (Micanopy)	A Florida Highway Patrol officer was checking on a car parked at the side of Interstate 75 and saw a man on the ground. The suspect fired several shots as the trooper took cover. The suspect fled into the woods and there was a four-hour manhunt (during which several shots were fired) until Jackson was spotted about 1:00 PM. Shots were exchanged and Jackson was killed.
2015-07-24	unnamed	Louisiana (New Orleans)	A man, after having an argument with his wife, drove his car down his street, hitting other cars and homes. When he was stopped by New Orleans police he got out of his vehicle and began to fight with an officer, who shot and killed the man.
2015-07-24	Raines, Seth (44)	California (Los Angeles)	A man opened fire in Studio City, when police arrived they took cover behind their patrol vehicles, the man raised his gun at the police and police opened fire, killing the man.
2015-07-24	Braswell, Roger (50)	Georgia (Brinson)	Decatur County Sheriff's Deputies went to Braswell's home because he had made suicide threats. During the four-hour negotiations Braswell also made threats against the deputies. He stepped out the back door and shot at deputies. One deputy shot back forcing Braswell to go back inside. Deputies entered the home and found him wounded. He died at a hospital.
2015-07-24	Gerston, Lee Aaron (33)	North Carolina (Pinnacle)	Gerston armed with knives, allegedly robbed a hair salon and took the husband of the owner hostage. They went to a residence where Stokes County Sheriff's Deputies found them and a standoff followed. After a few hours Gerston emerged armed with knives and approached the deputies, refusing to drop the knives. Deputies say they hit him with a stun gun but that did not stop him. Four officers shot and killed him.
2015-07-23	Satre, Tamala Anne (44)	California (Meadow Vista)	Placer County sheriff's deputies were sent to a home in Rio Vista based on a report of a suicidal woman. A deputy found Satre outside the home and asked her to show her hands. She pulled out a handgun and the deputy shot and killed her.
2015-07-23	Edison, Robbie Lee (47)	Wyoming (Douglas)	Shortly after midnight, a Converse County Sheriff's deputy was investigating a suspicious vehicle parked under a bridge on a rural road. A man was in a tent near the vehicle. The deputy learned the vehicle was stolen and the man, Robbie Lee Edison, had a warrant from South Dakota. When Edison emerged from the tent holding a pistol, the deputy shot and killed him.
2015-07-23	Stortzum, Brian (32)	South Carolina (Myrtle Beach)	Police were called to Stortzum's residence following a domestic dispute. When police arrived Stortzum showed a gun and threatened the lives of the woman and 3 children living with him. After refusing police orders to put down the gun police opened fire, killing him.
2015-07-23	Wolfsteller, Derek (31)	Minnesota (Plymouth)	Wolfsteller, who had recently struggled with his mental health, had ended up in a Plymouth Arby's. Both Wolfsteller and an Arby's employee had called the police requesting assistance. Wolfsteller was requesting to be taken to a hospital due to suffering from a severe mental health crisis. The Plymouth Police Department had been contacted by Wolfsteller's grandparents the previous day trying to have him forcibly brought to a hospital to undergo treatment for his mental health issues. When a police officer arrived on the scene at the Plymouth Arby's, she deployed her taser, which was ineffective. She then attempted to subdue him physically. Per the Plymouth Police Department, Wolfsteller began grabbing at her service sidearm. The police officer regained control of the weapon, shooting Wolfsteller in the head, killing him. Per eyewitness accounts, the officer was only on the scene for 20 minutes prior to Wolfsteller being killed.
2015-07-23	Martin, Dontae L. (34)	Ohio (Dayton)	Montgomery County Sheriff's deputies were sent to the scene where a driver had struck a parked car in a driveway. Martin was still inside his car when they arrived at the scene. As deputies looked into the car they could see Martin pointing a handgun at them. Deputies shot and fatally wounded Martin who died at a hospital. The Montgomery County Grand Jury returned no indictment for both deputies involved in the shooting.
2015-07-22	Williams, Andre Dontrell (26)	Oklahoma (Oklahoma City)	Four Oklahoma City Police officers went to a residence to investigate a rape and found the suspect hiding under a bed. When Williams emerged holding a knife the officers first tased him and then shot and killed him.
2015-07-22	Benitez-Santiago, Francisco (25)	Wisconsin (Monroe)	Monroe Police and Green County Sheriff's deputies responded to a call reporting the location of a man wanted for a homicide about 20 minutes earlier. When officers found the man hiding behind an apartment he pointed a gun at them from about 10-15 feet away. The officers shot and killed Benitez-Santiago. Benitez-Santiago's pistol was empty.
2015-07-22	Bush, James T. (20)	Michigan (St. Clair Shores)	Bush was riding his motorcycle about 9:30 P.M. when he struck the front passenger door of a police car which was turning left across the road in preparation to make a traffic stop. The left turn put the police vehicle directly in the path of the motorcycle, which the officer did not see. Bush was taken to a hospital where he died.
2015-07-22	Guisherd, Devon (26)	Pennsylvania (Philadelphia)	Guisherd, a homicide suspect, was killed during a shootout with police that stemmed from police serving an arrest warrant at his home. An officer was wounded in the shooting.
2015-07-21	Fuller, Joseph (24)	Florida (Oakland Park)	Fuller had fled from two traffic stops earlier in the day and was discovered to be wanted for a parole violation. When a Broward County Sheriff's detective pulled him over the third time Fuller reached for a revolver between his legs. The detective shot and killed him.
2015-07-21	Tyre, Jerrod (35)	Georgia (Jesup)	Wayne County Sheriff's Deputies investigating a domestic dispute heard several shots. They made contact with Tyre and the Special Response Team also arrived. Instead of surrendering as requested Tyre "aggressively approached" the deputies. A member of the Special Response Team fired several shots, killing Tyre.
2015-07-21	Wilson, Darren (47)	Georgia (Bartow)	A man wielding a stick was shot by a Bartow deputy after lunging at him.
2015-07-20	LeBoeuf, Joshua Blaine (35)	Texas (Winnie)	Chambers County Sheriff's deputies were attempting to arrest LeBoeuf for violation of a protective order when he broke free and grabbed a gun from his truck. Authorities say LeBoeuf fired at least one round and the deputies returned fire, killing him.
2015-07-20	Ibarra, Juan Adolfo (24)	Texas (Houston)	Harris County Sheriffs deputies were working security outside a nightclub about 3 a.m. when Ibarra fired his pistol into the air while he was leaving the club. A deputy asked Ibarra to put down the gun. Ibarra ran alongside a pickup truck firing the weapon. When Ibarra turned toward the deputies one deputy shot and killed him.
2015-07-20	Brown, Stephen Ray (54)	Oklahoma (Choctaw)	Off-duty Midwest City Police lieutenant Lacky Harkins was checking on his in-laws' house while they were on vacation. He saw the door open and when he entered the home he encountered an armed burglar whom he shot and killed. The Oklahoma County District Attorney cleared the officer in the killing.
2015-07-20	Godinez, Heriberto, Jr. (24)	Illinois (Chicago)	Godinez was arrested as a burglary suspect by Chicago Police. Police say he was sweating and breathing heavily when they restrained him and placed him in their car. He collapsed and police called paramedics but he was pronounced dead at the scene. The Cook County Medical Examiner attributed the death to cocaine and alcohol poisoning and the physical stress of being restrained.
2015-07-20	DuBose, Samuel (43)	Ohio (Cincinnati)	Samuel DuBose was pulled over by a University of Cincinnati police officer for a missing front license plate. He was asked for his driver's license, and DuBose allegedly declined to step out of the car. The officer fired one gunshot as DuBose put the key into his car's ignition and began to drive away, hitting DuBose once in the head. On July 29, Officer Ray Tensing was charged with murder.
2015-07-20	Francis, Troy (54)	California (Fremont)	Fremont Police were called when a man with a knife threatened two women. Two officers found Troy Francis in the front yard, holding a knife. The officers say that Francis did not obey commands to drop the knife and that they shot him when he charged them. He died of his wounds about a month later.
2015-07-19	Wheat, David (22)	Colorado (Fort Collins)	Wheat was causing a disturbance and made suicidal threats at an apartment complex near Colorado State University at 4 am, prompting police calls. Wheat then stabbed and injured a woman in the arm. As officers approached him, Wheat allegedly advanced towards them with the knife and was shot.
2015-07-18	Gomez, Estevan Andrade (26)	California (Farmersville)	Gomez was in the Tulare County Sheriff's Department booking room in Farmersville being processed on a parole violation by officers from the Farmersville Police Department. He began to fight with the officers and struggled to grab one of their weapons. He was shot by the officers and when medical aid arrived he was declared dead.
2015-07-18	Snyder, Kevin Thomas (46)	Arizona (Phoenix)	After Snyder's ex-girlfriend returned home to find Snyder in her home and he took her hostage at gunpoint she was eventually able to alert police with a silent keypad alarm. When Phoenix police officers arrived Snyder had left the home but officers found him hiding in the neighborhood. He pointed his weapon at the police and one officer shot at him. Snyder shot back at police and in the exchange one officer's shot killed Snyder.
2015-07-18	Dewey, Charles (65)	Kansas (Colby)	Colby Police officers went to Dewey's home to investigate a domestic disturbance. Dewey had left the home and officers from Colby Police, Thomas County Sheriff's Office and Kansas Highway Patrol searched for him. They found him hiding under a trailer. Authorities say that when Dewey fired at the officers he was shot by Colby Police officers and a deputy sheriff.
2015-07-18	Gonzales, Antonio (29)	Wisconsin (Wauwatosa)	Gonzales was armed with a sword and was shot by police during a domestic incident at his house. The officer who shot and killed Gonzales was also directly involved in the controversial fatal shooting of 17 year old Alvin Cole.
2015-07-18	Goode, Troy (30)	Mississippi (Southaven)	Southaven Police were called when Goode began "acting strange" after attending a rock concert. When he was arrested and placed face-down with hands and feet bound, Goode said he was having trouble breathing. He was taken to a hospital and died two hours later. An autopsy by a Mississippi Medical Examiner that attributes death to LSD toxicity is challenged by the family's lawyer who released an autopsy saying the cause of death was due to being hog-tied.
2015-07-18	Welsh, Robin George (55)	Florida (Orlando)	Welsh was riding a bicycle about 1 AM when he was struck by a vehicle driven by Orlando Police officer Ricardo Duenas who was driving with lights and siren active. Welsh died 24 July in a hospital.
2015-07-17	Smith, Sam Toshiro (27)	Washington (Seattle)	Seattle Police Officers were looking for a car which had rammed a police car on Interstate 5, causing the car to wind up in a ditch. When an officer found a car matching the description there was a confrontation with the driver who carried a large knife. The officer shot and killed Smith.
2015-07-17	Brand, Jackie, Jr. (50)	California (Needles)	San Bernardino County Sheriff deputies went to check on Brand's welfare after friends reported that Brand had said he wanted to hurt himself. When deputies located Brand at a residence he pointed a pistol at them, refusing to drop it as ordered but pointing at a deputy. The deputies shot and killed him.
2015-07-17	Rodriguez, Jose Roman (24)	Texas (Brownsville)	Brownsville Police officer Rolando Trujillo Jr pulled over a vehicle about 2 a.m., believing the occupants might be involved in a strong-arm robbery of a liquor store. The passenger fled on foot and Trujillo approached the door of the driver, Rodriguez. Apparently Rodriguez attempted to drive away and Trujillo shot four time, killing Rodriguez. Officer Trujillo was cleared in the shooting.
2015-07-17	Stewart, Darrius (19)	Tennessee (Memphis)	Stewart was a passenger in a car with a broken headlight pulled over by Memphis Police Officer Connor Schilling. When a check by the officer showed Stewart had arrest warrants, the officer attempted to handcuff and arrest Stewart. The two fought and Officer Schilling shot and killed Stewart.
2015-07-17	Davis, Albert (23)	Florida (Orlando)	At 1 am, at an apartment complex pool facility, Davis was shot during a struggle with an officer.
2015-07-17	Gonzales, Antonio (29)	Wisconsin (Wauwatosa)	When Gonzales became violent his house-mate called Wauwatosa Police. When police arrived Gonzales came out of the house brandishing a sword and did not comply with the officers' orders to drop it. Police say that as he approached the officers they shot and killed him. Gonzales' roommate said that he did have mental health issues.
2015-07-16	Hack, Saige Dell (23)	Wyoming (Cheyenne)	Cheyenne Police officers were responding to a disturbance call about a woman running from a house, claiming the man inside had a gun. When police approached the residence the suspect shot at them. Police returned fire and the suspect went back inside the house. Three hours later Hack was found dead inside the home, having been shot in the chest by police.
2015-07-16	Pippin, Patrick Stephen (30)	Kansas (Kansas City)	U.S. Marshals were preparing to serve a warrant at a Gladstone, Missouri residence when they saw their subject drive away. The pursuit went into Kansas City, Kansas where the suspect's vehicle blew a tire. Pippin emerged from the vehicle with a gun and was shot by the Marshals. He died at a hospital.
2015-07-16	Koellner, Pierre Gabriel (29)	Alabama (Opp)	After he was involved in a traffic accident on U.S. 84, Koellner fled from Opp Police officers who were investigating the accident. Authorities say that when the officers found Koellner he pulled a gun from his pocket and refused orders to put it down but instead fired the weapon. Officers shot Koellner who died 22 July at a hospital in Pensacola, Florida.
2015-07-16	Foster, Edward (35)	Florida (Homestead)	Police were called to the corner of a street in reports of a man armed with a gun. Police opened fire on Foster, who was allegedly armed with a handgun.
2015-07-16	Smith, Anthonie (25)	California (Moreno Valley)	About 3 a.m. Riverside County Sheriff deputies responded to call from a family member about a mentally ill person assaulting a family member. When the deputies arrived at the home, the subject injured a deputy and then fled. About 6 a.m. Smith stabbed another man. Shortly the deputies found him armed with a knife and a metal hand tool. The deputies attempted to control him with a taser, to no effect. When he advanced toward the deputies, still armed, he was shot and killed.
2015-07-16	Abdulazeez, Muhammad Youssef (24)	Tennessee (Chattanooga)	Abdulazeez was shot by police after having attacked a naval reserve center, resulting in the deaths of four members of the United States Marine Corps and one member of the United States Navy, and the wounding of another Marine, and a member of the Chattanooga Police Department.
2015-07-15	Kailing, Eugene (43)	Michigan (Marion)	Michigan State Police Trooper Scott Taylor was sent to the scene of a man behaving erratically in a vehicle on its side near a road. When Taylor made contact with Kailing, Kailing rushed toward the trooper with a metal pipe. Taylor used his Taser stun gun and when that did not stop the attack he shot and killed Kailing. In a report by Osceola County Prosecutor Tyler Thompson clearing Kailing in the shooting, Thompson also noted that acquaintances of Kailing knew him to have "mental issues."
2015-07-14	Maharrey, Larry Eugene (59)	California (Bakersfield)	Kern County Sheriff's deputy Marvin Gomez was driving with lights and siren westbound on Norris road while Maharrey was riding his motorcycle eastbound. When Deputy Gomez made a left turn at Airport Drive, Maharrey's motorcycle struck the side of his patrol car. The California Highway Patrol investigated the incident and recommended that Gomez be charged with manslaughter. The Kern County District Attorney reported they will not be filing charges against Gomez.
2015-07-14	Crandall, Charles D. (76)	Ohio (Southington)	Crandall first shot at his neighbor's truck with a .22 rifle, then when Trumbull County Sheriff's deputies arrived at his house and knocked on his door, he shot at the deputies. The deputies shot and killed Crandall.
2015-07-14	Avant, Chacarion (20)	Florida (Mascotte)	Lake County Sheriff's deputies responded to a 3 AM call from a home invasion victim hiding in her closet. When Avant exited the home he pointed a rifle at deputies who shot and killed him.
2015-07-13	Castaway, Paul (35)	Colorado (Denver)	Castaway was charging at two officers with a knife in his mobile home neighborhood. Officers shot him in the torso.
2015-07-13	Davis, Jason	California (Los Angeles)	Davis was carrying a knife outside a coffee shop in Venice, Los Angeles, and was shot by LAPD officers. A box cutter was found at the scene. Davis died July 15 at a hospital.
2015-07-13	Graham, Matthew Ryan (23)	California (Dunsmuir)	Graham was wanted as a person of interest in the disappearance of his six-month old daughter. He was tracked in connection with a carjacking by deputies from Siskyou County Sheriffs Department, Shasta County Sheriffs Department, and California Highway Patrol. Officers surrounded the garage where he was hiding and ordered him to surrender. Graham refused and fired his handgun. Officers shot and killed him.
2015-07-13	Brown, Nyal "Bud" (77)	Ohio (Columbus)	Brown died when he pulled his van out of a parking lot and was struck by an SUV driven by a Franklin County Sheriff's deputy. The deputy was driving with lights and siren on his way to assist another deputy.
2015-07-13	Stafford, Bruce Dean (55)	North Carolina (Hendersonville)	Bruce Stafford, who had been arrested for attempting to sell stolen puppies, struggled and suffered a "medical emergency" while being processed at the Henderson County Detention Center. He was pronounced dead at a nearby hospital. The district attorney announced no criminal charges will be filed against the deputies involved.
2015-07-13	Suazo, Rafael Esteban (23)	Massachusetts (Lynn)	Suazo was shot and killed by Lynn Police detective Stephen Emery, who was working undercover in a drug investigation and had observed Suazo making a drug transaction. When Suazo attempted to flee the scene, striking Detective Emery with his vehicle, the officer fired one shot through the windshield, killing Suazo.
2015-07-12	Benton, Christopher Charles (27)	Wyoming (Casper)	Casper Police were serving a search warrant at Benton's residence about 7:50 p.m. When he failed to open the door at their knock, the broke through the door. Encountering Benton holding a pistol, an officer fired seven or eight times, killing Benton. The District Attorney ruled that the use of deadly force was necessary and justifie.
2015-07-12	Lepine, David Allen (62)	Texas (Austin)	Austin Police were questioning Lepine at his home in response to a call from a woman reporting a man following her in a truck. While questioning Lepine officer noticed blood on his clothing and truck and were preparing to detain him in handcuffs when he ran and pulled a handgun. Lepine was ordered to drop the weapon but instead pointed it at officer Patrick Cheatham who then shot and killed Lepine. The District Attorney reported that a County Grand Jury concluded the officer will face no charges.
2015-07-12	Watson, Matthew (24)	Illinois (River Forest)	Watson was shot and killed when he shot at River Forest Police officers who had responded to a 911 call. He had shot and wounded his mother and killed her boyfriend.
2015-07-12	Ellswood, Salvado (36)	Florida (Plantation)	Plantation Police Officer Erik Carlton encountered Ellswood behind some office buildings about 9 P.M. and questioned him. Ellswood struck the officer and in the confrontation that followed the officer used his Taser stun gun and then shot and killed Ellswood.
2015-07-12	Farmer, Frederick (20)	Georgia (Stone Mountain)	Dekalb County Police officers responding to a report of a shooter at an apartment complex were met with gunfire when they arrived. One officer was shot five times. Police say officers returned fire, killing Frederick Farmer.
2015-07-11	Maine, Billy Jack (31)	California (Olivehurst)	Yuba County Sheriffs Deputies responded to a call from Maine's girlfriend reporting he was making threats toward his sons. They arrived to find Maine standing atop a vehicle holding a shotgun pointed at his head. When he repositioned the shotgun deputies shot and killed him.
2015-07-11	Ware, Anthony Dewayne (35)	Alabama (Tuscaloosa)	Anthony Dwayne Ware died after being pepper sprayed by Tuscaloosa police.
2015-07-11	Mann, George (35)	Georgia (Stone Mountain)	When a neighbor called about an irate man in a garage five Gwinnett County Police officers responded and attempted to make contact with George Mann. In the struggle that followed officers used a stun gun directly on Mann's body. He became unresponsive and was transported to a medical center where he was pronounced dead. Police say methamphetamine was found at the scene. The family says the 911 call was made because Mann needed medical attention.
2015-07-10	Todora, James (54)	Nevada (Las Vegas)	After a Las Vegas Police officer pulled over Todora's vehicle for a broken taillight, the encounter escalated. Todora pulled a handgun and there was a shootout between Todora and the three officers who were by then at the scene. Todora, who had been involved in an ongoing domestic dispute with his wife, was pronounced dead at the scene.
2015-07-10	McSwain, Eugene (25)	Illinois (Chicago)	McSwain was a passenger in the seat of a truck which was pulled over by Chicago Police. A police statement said he pointed a pistol at the police. He was shot in the back of the head and died. A gun was found on the floor of the truck.
2015-07-10	Blue, Freddie Lee (20)	Georgia (Covington)	Blue was one of four men in a car pulled over by Newton County Sheriff's deputies who suspected the vehicle was involved in an earlier crime. Authorities say that when the deputies were getting two of the men out of the car one of them pointed a gun at the deputies. The deputies shot and wounded two men. Blue died at a hospital and the other man released from the hospital.
2015-07-09	Hurtado, Cyrus Evencio (17)	California (Boulder Creek)	Santa Cruz Sheriff deputies responded to a call about a family dispute and encountered a man holding a rifle coming out of the home. Deputies say he pointed the rifle at them and they fired their weapons, striking Cyrus Hurtado four times. He was taken to a hospital where he died. Hurtado's mother said that he suffered from a mental disorder.
2015-07-09	White, Neil Peter (38)	California (Los Angeles)	Responding to reports of a man on a skateboard breaking windows, Los Angeles Police Department officers encountered White on his skateboard. When they attempted to detain him he resisted and during the struggle which followed the first officer tased White. When White grabbed the Taser and used it on the first officer, the other officer drew his weapon and shot and killed White. The Los Angeles Board of Police Commissioners found the shooting was not in compliance with department policy.
2015-07-09	Hammonds, Robert (68)	Arizona (Phoenix)	When Phoenix police tried to contact the driver of a car with stolen plates, the car took off. A police helicopter found the car an apartment complex where the driver (Hammonds) and passenger fled on foot, pursued by officers. During the foot pursuit Hammonds pointed a gun at officers. One officer shot and killed him. The second suspect was arrested.
2015-07-09	Palmisano, Rocco Joseph, III (50)	Utah (Parowan)	Parowan Police Officer Tyler Uresk was sent to Palmisano's home based on a neighbor's report of domestic violence. When Uresk arrived he encountered Palmisano, armed with a pistol in a holster, in the driveway. In the confrontation which followed Palmisano, with his hand on his holstered gun, approached to within seven feet of the officer. He failed to comply with the officer's orders to raise his hand away from the gun. The officer shot twice, striking Palmisano in the chest. He died on the way to the hospital.
2015-07-09	Washington, Jimmy Lloyd, Jr. (53)	Texas (Holiday Lakes)	Holiday Lakes Police Chief Harold Douglas responded to a call about a man pounding on doors around 2:30 a.m. When Chief Douglas arrived at the scene, Washington attacked him. The Chief was assisted in the struggle to subdue Washington by some residents. Washington became unresponsive and died at a hospital.
2015-07-09	Hawkins, Javon (21)	Missouri (Kansas City)	Hawkins was in a park wielding a sword when he was confronted by Kansas City Police officers. When Hawkins did not put the sword down as ordered and an officer felt threatened, the officer shot Hawkins four times. Hawkins was taken to a hospital where he died.
2015-07-09	Milliner, Martice (27)	Illinois (Chicago)	A Chicago Police officer reports that while attempting to detain a man fitting the description of a man with a gun, saw the man (Millilner) pull a gun from his waistband. The officer shot Milliner who fell to the ground. The officer says that Milliner still had the gun in his hand so he shot a second time, killing Milliner. Khadija Farmer, Milliner's sister, is suing the City of Chicago.
2015-07-08	Westrich, Michael Terence (59)	Oregon (Beaverton)	Beaverton Police officers responding to a domestic disturbance call found Westrich throwing bricks out of his mobile home and breaking windows. As officers approached, Westrich fired at them, striking one officer who survived. Officers returned fire, killing Westrich.
2015-07-08	Sanders, Jonathan (39)	Mississippi (Stonewall)	See Wikipedia article Death of Jonathan Sanders
2015-07-08	Shatley, Dallas (62)	North Carolina (Crumpler)	Shatley's neighbors called officers to the home reporting Shatley was creating a disturbance. After Ashe County Sheriff's deputies arrived, Shatley tried to drive away, reportedly dragging an officer. He was shot and killed. In September 2016 former deputy Joshua Hopkins was charged with second-degree murder in the case.
2015-07-07	Hernandez, Daniel Jr. (47)	California (Bakersfield)	About 6 pm two Bakersfield Police officers responded to calls of a man in a park firing a gun. Police report that when the officers confronted the man he pointed the gun at them and refused to drop it. Both officers fired, killing Hernandez. The Bakersfield Police Department Critical Incident Review Board found that the shooting was within department policy.
2015-07-07	Lopez, Jose Graciano (39)	Texas (Edinburg)	Lopez, a suspect in a domestic dispute, barricaded himself in his home and there was a three-hour standoff with Edinburg Police officers, during which he threatened suicide. Police say when Lopez fired his rifle at police, four officers fired their weapons, killing Lopez.
2015-07-07	Cody, Joe (59)	Texas (Dallas)	Dallas Police sought Joe Cody, a registered sex offender, on a parole violation for a sex-related crime. When four officers found him he was holding a handgun and refused to drop it. The four officers opened fire, killing Cody.
2015-07-07	Burley, Marcellus Jamarcus (18)	Texas (Missouri City)	Houston Police chased a vehicle with three people suspected of attempted armed robbery in the parking lot of a convenience store. After a five-mile vehicle pursuit two suspects left the car and police chased them on foot. When one of the suspects, weapon in hand, turned toward the officers, an office shot both of them killing Burley and wounding the other suspect.
2015-07-07	Booth, Nicholas (35)	Missouri (Sugar Creek)	Independence, Missouri Police officers spotted and chased a stolen car until the driver went into a dead end and left the vehicle. Police say he shot at the officers who returned fire, killing suspect Nicholas Booth. Booth had hijacked the car at gunpoint about thirty minutes earlier.
2015-07-07	Blough, Joshua S. (28)	Kentucky (Elizabethtown)	Elizabethtown Police responded to woman's call expressing concern about Blough. When two officers encountered Blough he was armed with a knife and refused officers' orders to drop it. He came toward the officers and they shot and killed him. The autopsy showed Blough tested positive for methamphetamines.
2015-07-07	Dantzler, Tremaine (37)	New Jersey (Atlantic City)	Dantzler was shot and killed by an Atlantic City Police officer outside a market after Dantzler had stabbed to death a store employee. It is reported that Dantzler was a drug addict not taking his medication.
2015-07-06	Dujanovic, Adam Edward (33)	Arizona (Mesa)	When Dujanovic was knocking on stranger's doors, asking for people who did not live there and attempting to enter the homes, Mesa Police were called. Officer King arrived in the neighborhood and Dujanovic grabbed a pry bar from the back of a truck and walked toward the officer. King ordered Dujanovic to stop and when he didn't, the officer shot and killed him.
2015-07-06	Gormley, Shane Patrick (30)	Utah (Ogden)	Ogden Police trying to arrest Gormley for an earlier car hijacking when he fled from his girlfriend's apartment. During the pursuit Gormley tried to hijack a car but the woman inside fought him until police arrived. Officers used their stun guns four times as they tried to get him into custody. He collapsed from a heart attack and was taken to a hospital where he died July 13.
2015-07-06	Rogers, Tyler (20)	Oklahoma (Oklahoma City)	Oklahoma City Police officers responding to a 1:30 a.m. auto burglary report found Rogers hiding in a nearby yard. Police say that when Rogers pointed a gun at Sgt Jeff Lunow, Lunow shot and killed him.
2015-07-06	Esty-Lennon, Hagen (42)	New Hampshire (Bath)	Esty-Lennon was in a car accident, and officers responded to the scene. As officers approached Esty-Lennon, he brandished a knife. He walked towards officers and at least one officer pulled out a Taser, and then a gun, and fired. Esty-Lennon was hit six times, from about 10 to 15 feet away. The shooting was ruled justified by the county's attorney general's office.
2015-07-06	Hendley, Jason M. (29)	California (Los Angeles)	Los Angeles Police Department officers were responding to a report of an assault at a home in the Sylmar neighborhood when they saw a man covered in blood and carrying a knife. The man, later identified as Hendley, refused to comply with their orders and walked toward the officers. The officers fired and Hendley was fatally wounded, dying the next day at a hospital. Hendley had earlier killed his mother's fiance during an argument.
2015-07-06	Berry, John Leonard (31)	California (Lakewood)	Los Angeles Sheriffs deputies shot and killed Berry while he was in his car in front of the home he shared with his mother and some siblings. He had a mental illness and appeared to be off his medication so his brother had called the local Sheriffs station asking for a mental health evaluation team. He was told deputies would be sent instead. The deputies reported that as they tried to remove him from the car he drove it in reverse, bruising the legs of a deputy. Four deputies fired several shots, killing him.
2015-07-06	Sarabia, David Oliva (27)	California (Atwater)	Sarabia was being sought for a domestic violence-related kidnapping when Atwater Police spotted his car. When his car stopped after a high speed chase, Sarabia exited the vehicle and eventually, with knife in hand, charged the officers. After a Taser proved ineffective, an officer fired four or five times, killing Sarabia.
2015-07-05	Van De Putte, Neil (25)	New Jersey (Forked River)	While crossing Lacey Road with a friend in the early hours of the day, Neil Van De Putte was struck and killed by a speeding patrol car driven by Officer Andrew Slota. Slota was responding to a service call in his marked 2006 Ford Crown Victoria on the eastbound side of Lacey Rd at 3:21 a.m. when he struck Van De Putte, launching him 240 feet away from the collision. The vehicle then swerved off the road and wrecked into a utility pole. During the investigation, it was noted that the officer had a green light at the time of the accident; however, the car did not have its emergency lights and siren activated. Though, the investigative report stated that the vehicle's headlights were on. At the point of impact, Slota was traveling 80+mph, according to the vehicle's black box, in a 45 mph zone. The Ocean County Prosecutor's Office found no grounds for filing charges against Officer Andrew Slota after a nearly six-month long investigation.
2015-07-05	Deming, John (19)	California (Pleasanton)	Deming broke into a car shop and was vandalizing cars and equipment and screaming. Officers arrived on the scene and fired less lethal weapons to restrain Deming. According to Pleasanton officers, Deming charged at an officer and assaulted him with his fists. One officer fired three shots at Deming.
2015-07-05	Anderson, Johnny Ray (42)	California (Hawaiian Gardens)	Los Angeles County Sheriffs deputies were investigating a report of a prowler about 9:40 p.m. when a deputy found Anderson in the backyard of an abandoned house. A Sheriff's spokesman said Anderson was trying to grab the deputy's weapon. The deputy shot and killed Anderson. An attorney for Anderson's family said a neighbor saw Anderson with raised hands several feet away from the deputy.
2015-07-05	Munroe, Richard Alexander (25)	Texas (Austin)	Dispatchers sent Austin Police to respond to a call from a suicidal man about 4:00 a.m. When police got to the door the man, Munroe, had a weapon. They ordered him to drop the weapon, then tased him and he went back inside. Police say when he came back out again he pointed the weapon at them and that is when they shot and killed him. The weapon was a BB pistol. Munroe's family has filed a wrongful death lawsuit against the City of Austin and police officers involved.
2015-07-05	Holt, Michael Mcgregor (35)	Texas (Austin)	Holt was killed by Austin Police Officer Carlos Lopez after Holt pointed a rifle at him. Lopez was responding to a report of a man with a rifle killing a cab driver and shooting up the lobby of an Austin hotel.
2015-07-04	Bauer, Bryan David (36)	Nevada (Henderson)	When a man in a Henderson hotel room fired multiple shots in his room and out the window, Henderson Police were called. When officers approached his room, the shooter emerged holding a handgun and rushed toward the officers, who then shot the suspect. Bauer was taken to a hospital where he died.
2015-07-04	Malone, Robert Elando (42)	Oklahoma (Oklahoma City)	When a man with a gun was reported to be walking around an apartment parking lot checking cars, Oklahoma City Police responded. A police helicopter was used to locate the suspect. When Malone raised his arm to point his weapon at the helicopter an officer shot at him. Malone then fired at the police and two officers shot and killed him.
2015-07-04	Gaby, Michael Shannon (37)	Tennessee (Morristown)	When he was pulled over by Morristown Police officer Rocky White, Gaby was discovered to have an outstanding arrest warrant. Police say that when White attempted to arrest him Gaby pulled a handgun. White shot and killed Gaby.
2015-07-04	Rabasa, Maximo (52)	Florida (Miami)	Rabasa, who had a history of mental problems, was clad in boxer shorts and carrying a knife when a Miami Police officer encountered him. Rabasa attacked the officer who then locked himself in his patrol car and called for backup. When additional officers arrived they attempted to subdue Rabasa with several shots from their Taser stun guns. During the scuffle Rabasa collapsed and was transported to a hospital where he died the next day.
2015-07-04	Beaty, Kawanza Jamal(23)	Virginia (Newport News)	Newport News Police officers were responding to calls from a confidential informant about a man with a sawed-off shotgun. When officers found and confronted the suspect they saw the shotgun. When Beaty pointed the shotgun toward an officer another officer shot and killed him. The shotgun was not loaded.
2015-07-03	Lopez, Arturo (46)	California (Lancaster)	A gang unit from the Los Angeles County Sheriffs Department was patrolling in Lancaster when they stopped their vehicle to talk to two men. As they exited their vehicle one of the men pulled a semi-automatic assault pistol from under his jacket and the shooting began. Lopez was killed and his companion ran away.
2015-07-03	Juarez, Cesar A. Limon (27)	California (West Covina)	West Covina Police responded to a call about Cesar Juarez who stabbed his brother and then walked away from their residence. An office encountered him on a nearby street, still armed with a kitchen knife. In the confrontation which followed the officer shot Juarez with his Taser but Juarez stood up and came at the officer. The officer shot and killed him.
2015-07-03	Nguyen, Ton (60)	California (San Diego)	Nguyen was acting erratically and assaulted a man in an apartment complex in Black Mountain Ranch. As officers arrived, Nguyen was armed with a kitchen knife and charged at officers. One officer fired one shot to Nguyen's torso.
2015-07-02	Siqueiros, Christian (25)	California (Montclair)	Montclair Police officers responded to the scene of a man behaving strangely and causing a disturbance. As officers tried to take him into custody there was a struggle and Siqueiros suffered an apparent heart attack and died.
2015-07-02	Joseph, Julian (40)	Florida (Miami Beach)	Suspected bank robber Joseph was located in his apartment about two blocks from the bank and surrounded by officers from the Miami Beach Police Department. After a standoff of several hours SWAT officers entered the apartment and shot and killed him.
2015-07-02	Larosa, Victor Emanuel (23)	Florida (Jacksonville)	Larosa fled from Jacksonville Sheriff's deputies as they closed in on him at an undercover drug sting operation. Larosa ran went through yards and climbed over fences until he fell and Detective Mike Boree caught up with him. Police say that as Larosa got up he reached toward his waistband. Detective Boree fired eight rounds, killing Larosa.
2015-07-02	Johnson, Brian (59)	West Virginia (Meadow Bridge)	Officers from the West Virginia State Police and the Sumners County Sheriff's Office responded to a domestic hostage situation. Authorities had heard the man may have wanted to commit "suicide by cop." When officers arrived suspect Brian Johnson shot an arrow at them with his crossbow. Officers returned fire and killed him.
2015-07-02	Buckley, Douglas (45)	Massachusetts (Brockton)	Buckley's wife called 911 reporting Mr. Buckley had been drinking, was suicidal, and had BB guns. When Brockton Police officers arrived Buckley pointed a handgun at the officers. Both officers fired, killing Buckley. The handgun was a BB gun. The Massachusetts Attorney General ruled the shooting was justified.
2015-07-01	Judson, Kevin (24)	Oregon (McMinnville)	Judson was in a vehicle which was pulled over by a deputy from the Yamhill County Sheriff's Office. He fled the scene the deputy called for assistance. He was shot after he got into a struggle with an assisting deputy when he attempted to flee in that deputy's vehicle.
2015-07-01	Landon, Kaleb (32)	Oregon (Wolf Creek)	When Yreka, California police found a dead body in the home occupied by Landon, they put out a bulletin which included a description of his car. Oregon State Police pulled Landon over on Interstate 5 near Wolf Creek, Oregon and agents from the Bureau of Alcohol, Tobacco, Firearms and Explosives joined them. After a standoff the officers shot and killed Landon.
2015-07-01	Jeffries, William Dale (57)	West Virginia (Weston)	When Weston Police Officer Eric Riddle responded to a report of a drunk and disorderly person urinating in public he encountered Jeffries. During a scuffle which followed Jeffries struck his head on the police car and his neck snapped. Jeffries died 16 July. After an investigation Officer Riddle was found not to have violated any law.
2015-07-??	Elbert Piolo	Guam	

== See also ==
- Death in custody
- Encounter killings by police (India)
- List of American police officers killed in the line of duty
- List of cases of police brutality
- Lists of killings by law enforcement officers
- List of killings by law enforcement officers in the United States
- Police brutality in the United States
- Lynching in the United States
