= Dog Lake (Mount Aire, Utah) =

Lake in the state of Utah, United States

- Location within Utah Location within the United States
- Location: North America
- Coordinates: 40.6672140°N 111.6394774°W
- Basin countries: United States
- Surface elevation: 8,743 ft (2,665 m)

Dog Lake is a lake in Salt Lake County, Utah located between Millcreek Canyon and Big Cottonwood Canyon. The lake can be accessed by hiking trails from either canyon.
