= Canyon Rim, Utah =

Place in Utah, United States

Canyon Rim
- Former CDP
- Canyon Rim seen from Grandeur Peak

- Location within the state of Utah
- Coordinates: 40°42′24″N 111°49′19″W
- Country: United States
- State: Utah
- County: Salt Lake

Area
  - Total: 2.1 sq mi (5.4 km^{2})
  - Land: 2.1 sq mi (5.4 km^{2})
  - Water: 0 sq mi (0.0 km^{2})
- Elevation: 4,616 ft (1,407 m)

Population (2000)
  - Total: 10,428
  - Density: 5,034/sq mi (1,943.5/km^{2})
- Time zone: UTC-7 (Mountain (MST))
  - Summer (DST): UTC-6 (MDT)
- Postal codes: 84106, 84109
- Area codes: 385, 801
- FIPS code: 49-10390
- GNIS feature ID: 1867577

Canyon Rim was a census-designated place (CDP) in Salt Lake County, Utah, United States, that was consolidated with neighboring Millcreek CDP in 2010. The consolidated CDP was incorporated in 2016. The population was 10,428 at the 2000 census, a minuscule decrease from the 1990 figure of 10,527. The area formerly in Canyon Rim CDP is located just south of Interstate 80 and the Sugar House neighborhood of Salt Lake City near the mouth of Parley's Canyon (hence the name Canyon Rim). Canyon rim is notable for Canyon Rim Park, Tanner Park, and Parleys Historic Nature Park.

The area formerly in Canyon Rim CDP is part of the Salt Lake City, Utah Metropolitan Statistical Area.

== Geography ==
According to the United States Census Bureau, the CDP had a total area of 2.1 square miles (5.4 km^{2}), all of it land.

== Demographics ==
Historical population
Census	Pop.	Note	%±
1990	10,527		—
2000	10,428		−0.9%

As of the census of 2000, there were 10,428 people, 3,936 households, and 2,774 families residing in the CDP. The population density was 5,033.6 people per square mile (1,945.1/km^{2}). There were 4,091 housing units at an average density of 1,974.7/sq mi (763.1/km^{2}). The racial makeup of the CDP was 95.38% White, 0.54% African American, 0.28% Native American, 1.56% Asian, 0.32% Pacific Islander, 0.74% from other races, and 1.19% from two or more races. Hispanic or Latino of any race were 2.40% of the population.

There were 3,936 households, out of which 30.1% had children under the age of 18 living with them, 57.8% were married couples living together, 9.4% had a female householder with no husband present, and 29.5% were non-families. 22.8% of all households were made up of individuals, and 11.5% had someone living alone who was 65 years of age or older. The average household size was 2.65 and the average family size was 3.14.

In the CDP, the population was spread out, with 25.1% under the age of 18, 10.0% from 18 to 24, 29.5% from 25 to 44, 18.1% from 45 to 64, and 17.2% who were 65 years of age or older. The median age was 35 years. For every 100 females, there were 95.7 males. For every 100 females age 18 and over, there were 90.2 males.

The median income for a household in the CDP was $51,416, and the median income for a family was $57,445. Males had a median income of $41,888 versus $30,354 for females. The per capita income for the CDP was $23,587. About 3.7% of families and 5.8% of the population were below the poverty line, including 6.4% of those under age 18 and 4.1% of those age 65 or over.
