= Grandeur Peak =

Mountain in Salt Lake County, Utah, United States

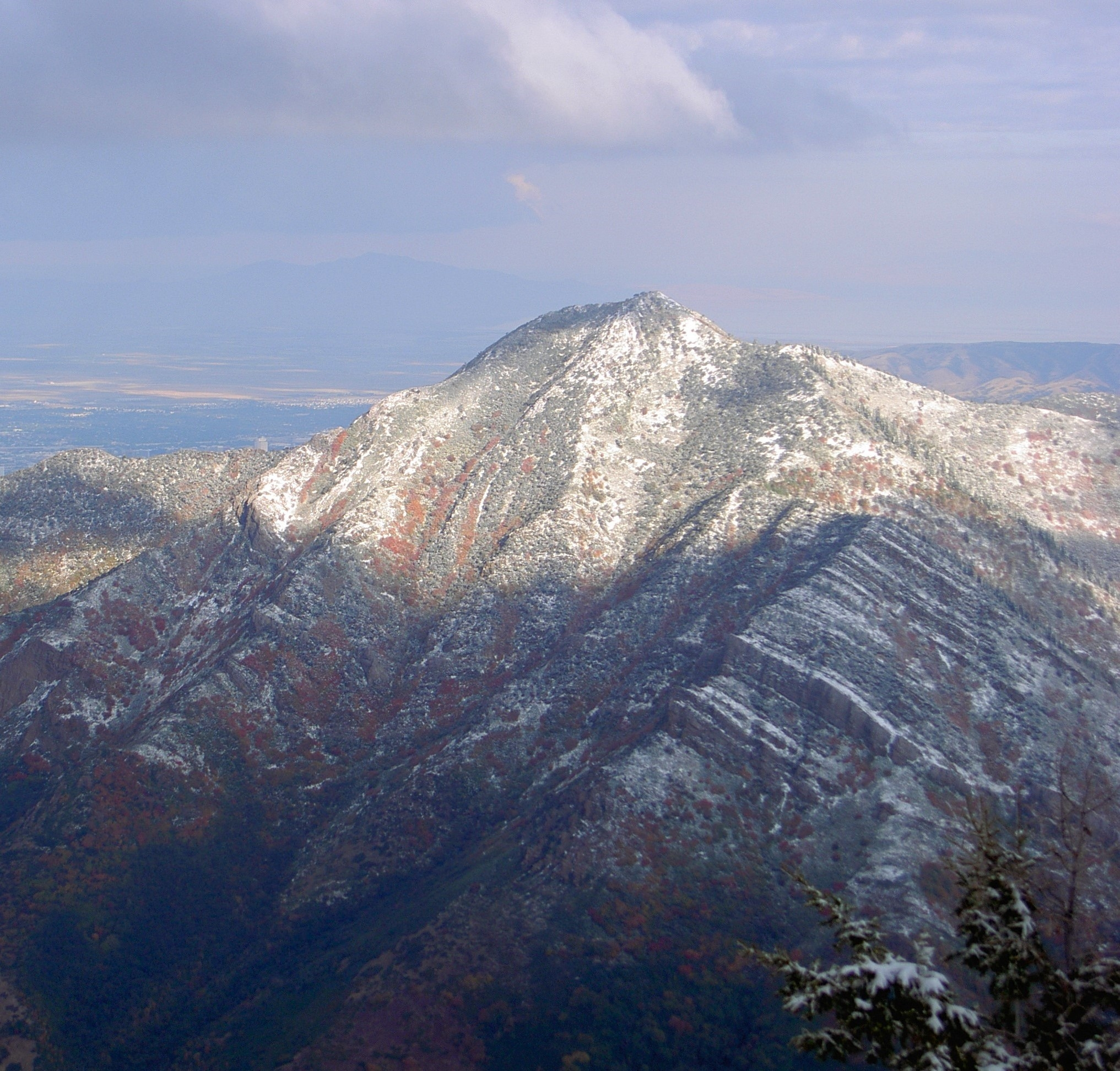
- Southeast aspect

Highest point
- Elevation: 8,299 ft (2,530 m)
- Prominence: 739 ft (225 m)
- Parent peak: Church Fork Peak (8,306 ft)
- Isolation: 1.93 mi (3.11 km)
- Coordinates: 40°42′25″N 111°45′35″W

Geography
- Location within Utah Location within the United States
- Country: United States of America
- State: Utah
- County: Salt Lake
- Parent range: Wasatch Range; Rocky Mountains
- Topo map: USGS Sugar House

Geology
- Rock type: Sedimentary rock

Climbing
- Easiest route: class 1 hiking trail

Grandeur Peak is an 8,299-foot-elevation (2,530-meter) mountain summit in the Wasatch Range in Salt Lake County, Utah, United States.

== Description ==
Grandeur Peak is located eight miles (13 km) southeast of downtown Salt Lake City on land managed by Uinta-Wasatch-Cache National Foreste. The peak is part of the Wasatch Range, which is a subset of the Rocky Mountains. Precipitation runoff from the mountain's north slope drains to Parleys Creek, whereas the south slope drains to Mill Creek. Topographic relief is significant as the summit rises 3,300 feet (1,006 meters) above Parleys Canyon in 1.25 mile (2 km) and 2,700 feet (823 meters) above Millcreek Canyon in one mile (1.6 km). The peak is prominent on the Wasatch skyline, and it is the most accessible as well as easiest climb of the major peaks rising above the Salt Lake Valley. Reaching the top involves 3.4 miles of trail hiking with 2,300 feet of elevation gain, and the summit provides excellent views of Salt Lake City. This mountain's toponym has been officially adopted by the United States Board on Geographic Names.

== Gallery ==
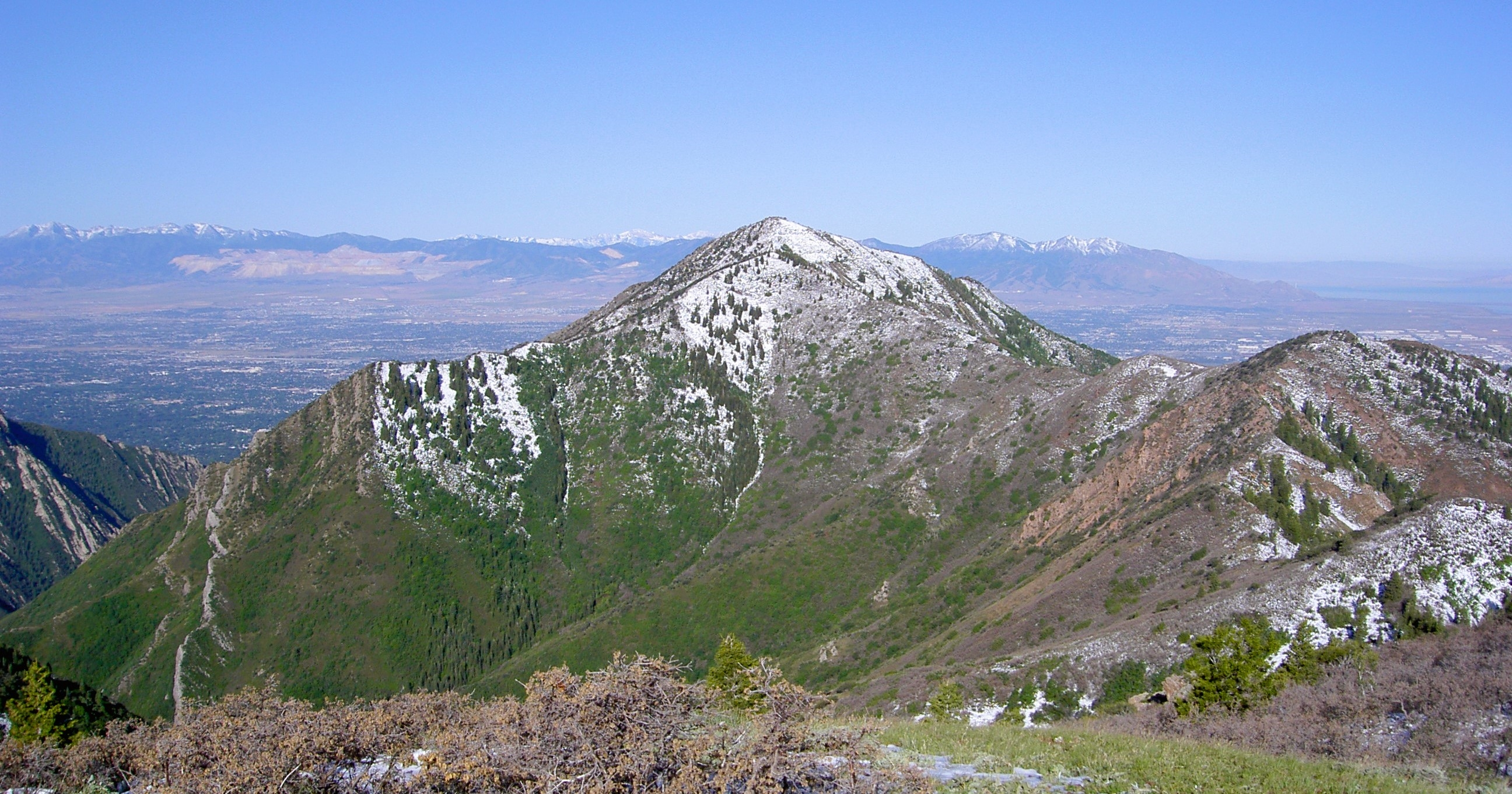
East aspect

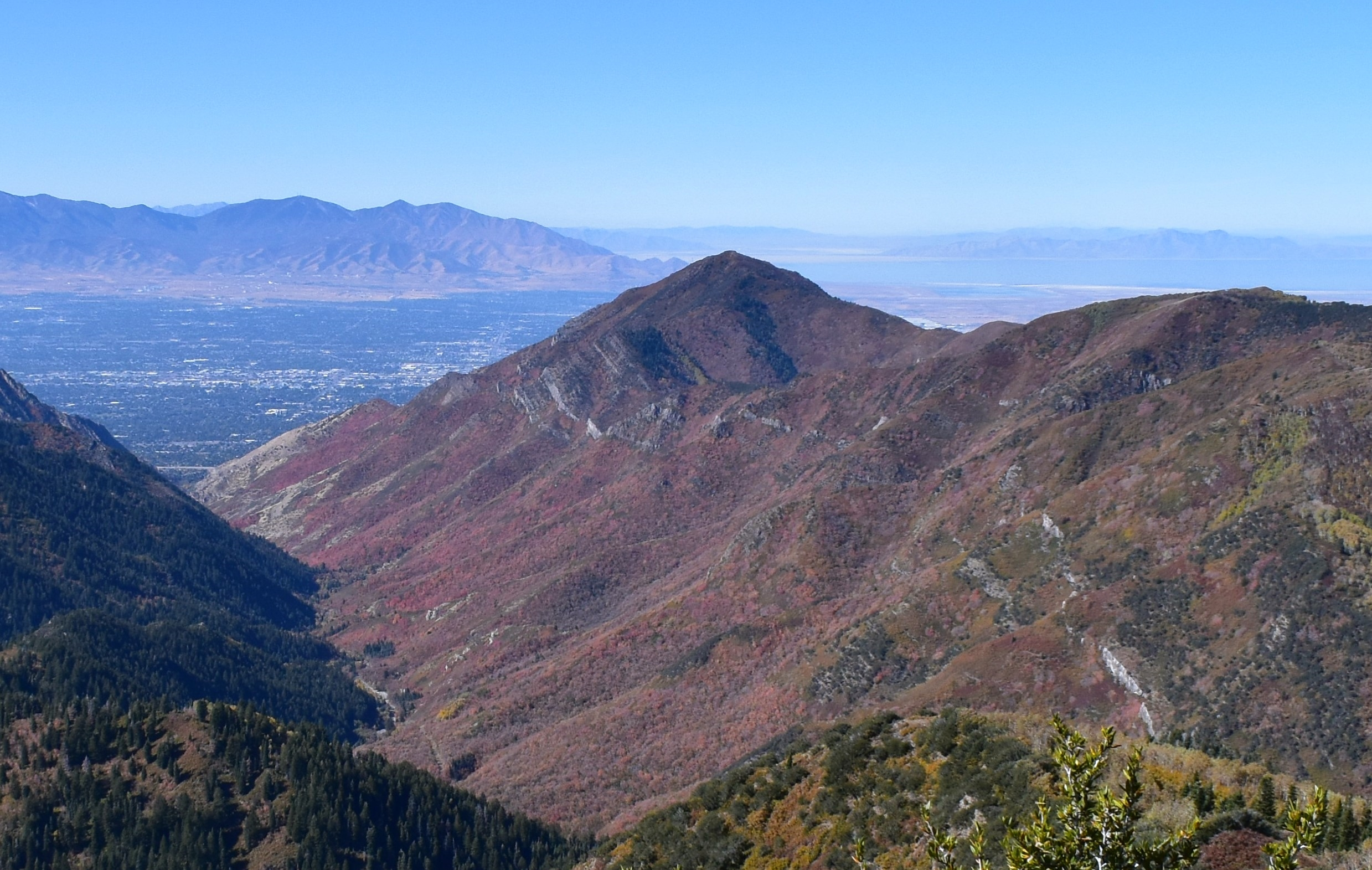
Grandeur Peak (center) from the east. Millcreek Canyon in lower left.

== See also ==
- List of mountains in Utah
