= Dog Lake (Brighton, Utah) =

Lake in the state of Utah, United States

- Location within Utah Location within the United States
- Location: Salt Lake County
- Coordinates: 40.5872406°N 111.5846027°W
- Basin countries: United States
- Surface elevation: 9,383 ft (2,860 m)

Dog Lake is a lake in Salt Lake County, Utah located near the Brighton Ski Resort.
