= East Millcreek, Utah =

East Millcreek
- Former CDP
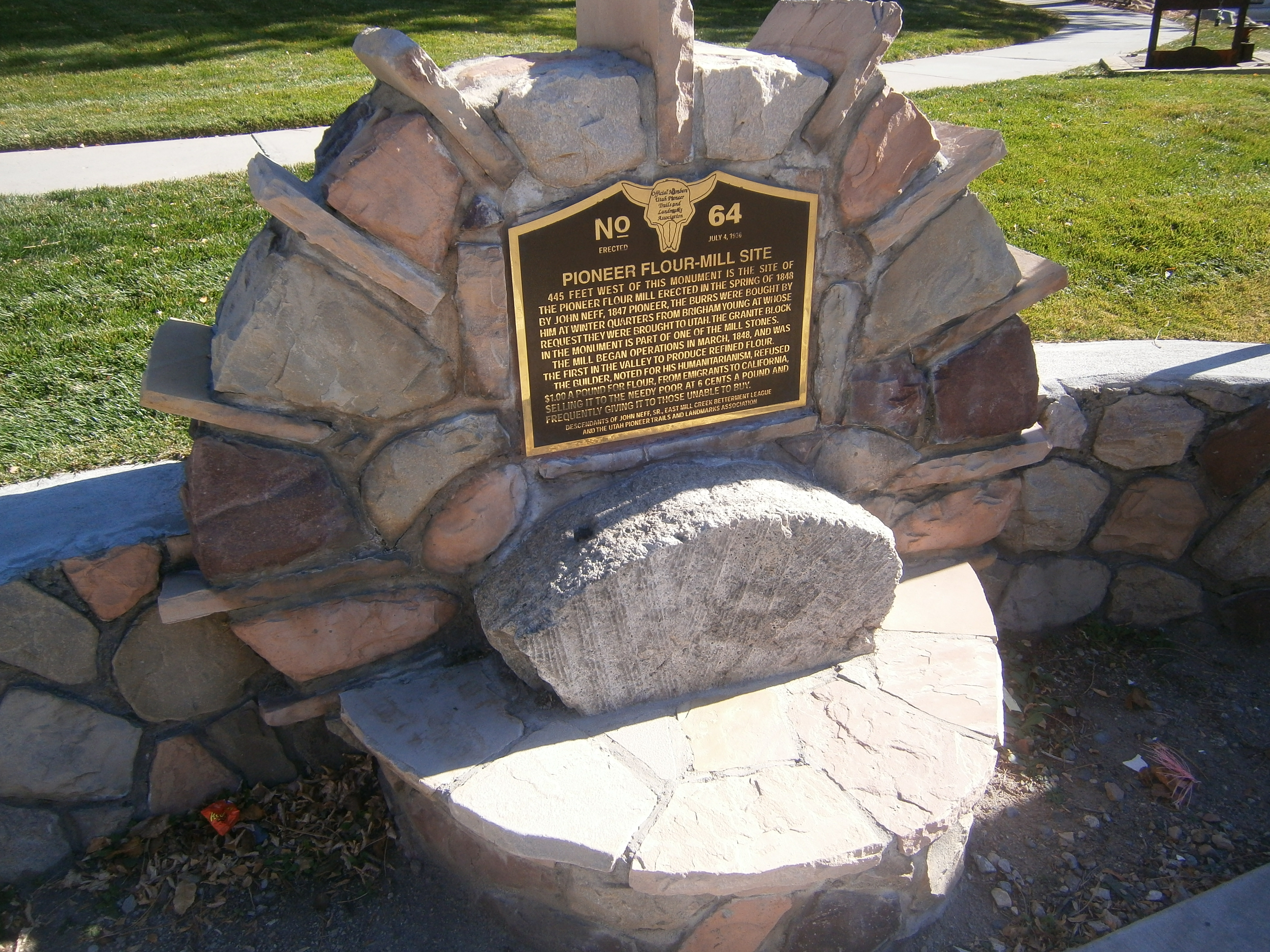
- Site of the original mill

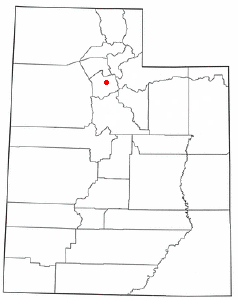
- Location of East Mill Creek, Utah
- Coordinates: 40°41′15″N 111°49′14″W
- Country: United States
- State: Utah
- County: Salt Lake

Area
  - Total: 4.4 sq mi (11.5 km^{2})
  - Land: 4.4 sq mi (11.5 km^{2})
  - Water: 0 sq mi (0.0 km^{2})
- Elevation: 4,770 ft (1,454 m)

Population (2000)
  - Total: 21,385
  - Density: 4,802/sq mi (1,853.9/km^{2})
- Time zone: UTC-7 (Mountain (MST))
  - Summer (DST): UTC-6 (MDT)
- Area codes: 385, 801
- FIPS code: 49-21550
- GNIS feature ID: 1427710

East Millcreek was a census-designated place (CDP) in Salt Lake County, Utah, United States, that was consolidated with neighboring Millcreek in 2010. The consolidated CDP was incorporated in 2016. The population was 21,385 at the 2000 census, a minute increase over the 1990 figure of 21,184. It was originally proposed to be included in the corporate limits of the city of Holladay, which was incorporated on November 29, 1999. However, inclusion of East Millcreek was rejected by voters in 2008. East Millcreek was then incorporated with the former Millcreek CDP as the city of Millcreek on December 28, 2016.

== Geography ==
According to the United States Census Bureau, the CDP had a total area of 4.4 square miles (11.5 km^{2}), all of it land.

== Demographics ==
Historical population
Census	Pop.	Note	%±
1970	26,579		—
1980	24,150		−9.1%
1990	21,184		−12.3%
2000	21,385		0.9%

As of the census of 2000, there were 21,385 people, 7,479 households, and 5,564 families residing in the CDP. The population density was 4,801.6 people per square mile (1,855.5/km^{2}). There were 7,707 housing units at an average density of 1,730.5/sq mi (668.7/km^{2}). The racial makeup of the CDP was 95.04% White, 0.43% African American, 0.14% Native American, 1.45% Asian, 0.26% Pacific Islander, 1.08% from other races, and 1.59% from two or more races. Hispanic or Latino of any race were 2.74% of the population.

There were 7,479 households, out of which 33.2% had children under the age of 18 living with them, 62.2% were married couples living together, 9.3% had a female householder with no husband present, and 25.6% were non-families. 20.7% of all households were made up of individuals, and 10.2% had someone living alone who was 65 years of age or older. The average household size was 2.82 and the average family size was 3.31.

In the CDP, the population was spread out, with 26.8% under the age of 18, 10.0% from 18 to 24, 23.4% from 25 to 44, 21.5% from 45 to 64, and 18.3% who were 65 years of age or older. The median age was 38 years. For every 100 females, there were 94.3 males. For every 100 females age 18 and over, there were 89.9 males.

The median income for a household in the CDP was $57,678, and the median income for a family was $66,742. Males had a median income of $51,165 versus $30,507 for females. The per capita income for the CDP was $25,206. About 4.3% of families and 5.7% of the population were below the poverty line, including 7.8% of those under age 18 and 2.8% of those age 65 or over.

== Culture ==
- Millcreek Community Center - A key feature of East Millcreek is the Millcreek Community Center, which includes a library, gym, and senior center, located adjacent to Evergreen Park. The park and community center offer a popular gathering place for community members of all ages.
- Baldwin Radio Factory - Located near Millcreek Community Center is Baldwin Radio Factory, a historic building that now houses various art studios and small businesses.

== Name discrepancy ==
The historic name of the area is "East Mill Creek", as three distinct words. Although the variant "East Millcreek" currently is widely used, the community council and several other local entities retain the original usage.

East Mill Creek was settled in 1848. Its name derives because it was along the more eastern creek in the valley with a mill.
