= Millcreek, Utah =

City in Utah, United States

- City
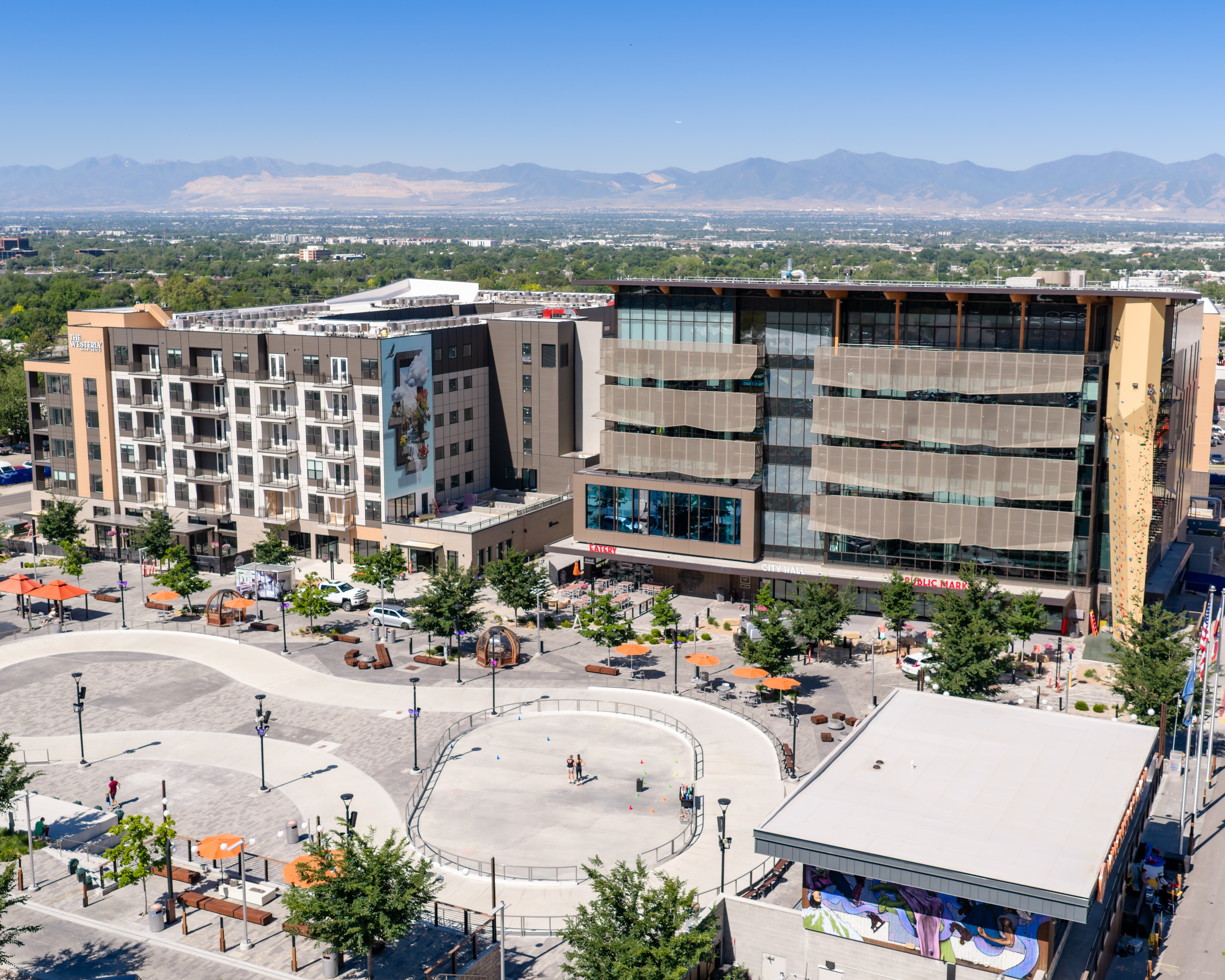
- Millcreek City Hall

- Flag

- Location in Salt Lake County and the state of Utah.
- Coordinates: 40°41′10″N 111°51′50″W
- Country: United States
- State: Utah
- County: Salt Lake
- Incorporated: December 28, 2016
- Named for: Mill Creek

Government
  - Mayor: Cheri Jackson

Area
  - Total: 12.77 sq mi (33.07 km^{2})
  - Land: 12.77 sq mi (33.07 km^{2})
  - Water: 0 sq mi (0.00 km^{2})
- Elevation: 4,285 ft (1,306 m)

Population (2020)
  - Total: 63,380
  - Density: 4,963.8/sq mi (1,916.54/km^{2})
- Time zone: UTC−7 (Mountain (MST))
  - Summer (DST): UTC−6 (MDT)
- ZIP codes: 84106, 84107, 84109, 84117, 84124
- Area codes: 385, 801
- FIPS code: 49-50150
- GNIS feature ID: 1867579
- Website: millcreekut.gov

Millcreek is a city in Salt Lake County, Utah, United States, and part of the Salt Lake City metropolitan area. The population as of the 2020 census was 63,380. Prior to its incorporation on December 28, 2016, Millcreek was a census-designated place (CDP) and township.

== History ==
Early settlers of the Millcreek area in 1848 included Mary Fielding Smith (widow of Hyrum Smith) and her children, including Joseph F. Smith. The area remained essentially rural in character until after World War II. As postwar suburban growth spilled south over the Salt Lake City limits, the area was not annexed by the city and remained unincorporated.

By the 1980s, most of the area now in Millcreek was built out and known by various names, including East Mill Creek, Canyon Rim and Mount Olympus. In the 2000 census, the area was divided among four CDPs for statistical purposes, the westernmost of which was designated Millcreek CDP. The population of this CDP was 30,377 at the 2000 census, and had a total area of 4.9 square miles (12.8 km^{2}). Canyon Rim CDP, East Millcreek CDP, and Mount Olympus CDP were consolidated with Millcreek CDP in the 2010 census, doubling its population to 62,139.

Salt Lake County created Millcreek Township in 2002 as an administrative subentity that included the populated CDPs as well as undeveloped Mill Creek Canyon in the Uinta-Wasatch-Cache National Forest immediately to the east. The township was created to give residents of the area more local control over planning and prevent annexations by neighboring cities.

As other communities south of Salt Lake City were incorporated in the 1990s and 2000s, Millcreek remained as the most populous unincorporated area of Salt Lake County. Residents considered a number of options for their future, including incorporation, which would make it the county's fifth-largest city. Amalgamation with neighboring South Salt Lake was also proposed, which would have combined South Salt Lake's commercial and industrial base with Millcreek's heavily residential character, creating a city of over 80,000.

The incorporation of Millcreek was the subject of a contentious 2012 ballot question, which set the boundaries of the proposed city identical to that of Millcreek Township, and asked voters what form of municipal government should be implemented. The initiative failed with only 40 percent of the vote, leaving Millcreek under the jurisdiction of the Salt Lake County Mayor and Council, as are other unincorporated areas of the county.

The question was put on the ballot again three years later, and Millcreek residents voted for incorporation on November 3, 2015. In the 2016 election, residents voted for a mayor and city council members in advance of incorporation, which was recorded at 9:30 a.m. on December 28, 2016.

A major initiative since incorporation has been planning for a downtown or city center that would tie together Millcreek's disparate neighborhoods and provide a focal point and identity for the city. The area around Highland Drive and 3300 South, a central location with an established commercial base, has been designated for this purpose. The area is adjacent to Brickyard Plaza, a shopping center Salt Lake City annexed in 1979 and became surrounded by Millcreek when it incorporated. Millcreek officials saw Brickyard Plaza as an obstacle to creating Millcreek's new downtown and sought to overturn the annexation, though it had been uncontested for decades, creating tensions between the two municipalities. The boundary dispute was resolved when Salt Lake City agreed to transfer some property to Millcreek that would allow for a contiguous city center, in exchange for Millcreek giving up any claims to Brickyard Plaza.

== Geography ==
Suburban in character, Millcreek is wedged between Salt Lake City and South Salt Lake on the north and Murray and Holladay on the south. Millcreek residents typically identify with Salt Lake City, which is designated by the U.S. Postal Service as the default place name for mailing addresses in the area. Millcreek is a recognized place name for addresses in the ZIP codes 84106, 84107, 84109, 84117, and 84124. The city is organized into four community councils, Canyon Rim, East Mill Creek, Millcreek, and Mount Olympus, roughly corresponding to the former CDPs.

=== Climate ===
This climatic region is typified by large seasonal temperature differences, with warm to hot summers and cold (sometimes severely cold) winters. According to the Köppen Climate Classification system, Millcreek has a humid continental climate, abbreviated "Dfb" on climate maps.

=== Neighborhoods and community areas ===
Historically distinct communities from which Millcreek developed include:

- Canyon Rim, located in the northeastern Millcreek, which developed during the post-World War II period as agricultural property was subdivided for housing. The Canyon Rim name came into broader use as homes were constructed near the rim of Parleys Hollow during the 1950s.
- East Mill Creek, which includes residential areas near the mouth of Mill Creek Canyon and some of the city's earliest settlement areas. Farms and orchards historically characterized portions of the community before suburban subdivision accelerated during the 20th century.
- Mount Olympus, which includes the Olympus Cove area, and occupies portions of the eastern foothills. Much of Olympus Cove was formerly used for orchards and livestock grazing before suburban development expanded after World Was II.
- The western and central portions of Millcreek, which contain denser residential and commercial development.

== Economy and Development ==
Millcreek is mainly residential, with commercial development concentrated along Highland Drive, 3300 South, 3900 South, and other major transportation corridors. The city's commercial areas developed alongside the expansion of suburban housing during the 20th century.

Following incorporation, Millcreek adopted planning policies intended to encourage mixed-use development near its city center. The redevelopment surrounding Millcreek Common has included residential, retail, restaurant, and civic uses.

During the COVID-19 pandemic, the city established business assistance programs. According to its 2020 economic development report, Millcreek reimbursed advertising expenses for 130 retailers and assisted 98 businesses in accessing Salt Lake County's Small Business Impact Grant program.

== Demographics ==
Historical population
Census	Pop.	Note	%±
1990	32,230		—
2000	30,377		−5.7%
2010	62,139		104.6%
2020	63,380		2.0%

=== 2020 census ===
As of the 2020 census, Millcreek had a population of 63,380. The median age was 35.7 years. 22.2% of residents were under the age of 18 and 15.7% of residents were 65 years of age or older.

For every 100 females there were 94.8 males, and for every 100 females age 18 and over there were 92.8 males age 18 and over. 99.7% of residents lived in urban areas, while 0.3% lived in rural areas.

There were 25,111 households in Millcreek, of which 27.9% had children under the age of 18 living in them. Of all households, 44.7% were married-couple households, 19.8% were households with a male householder and no spouse or partner present, and 28.6% were households with a female householder and no spouse or partner present. About 28.7% of all households were made up of individuals and 11.1% had someone living alone who was 65 years of age or older. There were 26,650 housing units, of which 5.8% were vacant. The homeowner vacancy rate was 0.9% and the rental vacancy rate was 6.5%.

Racial composition as of the 2020 census
Race	Number	Percent
White	49,355	77.9%
Black or African American	1,850	2.9%
American Indian and Alaska Native	593	0.9%
Asian	2,916	4.6%
Native Hawaiian and Other Pacific Islander	468	0.7%
Some other race	2,794	4.4%
Two or more races	5,404	8.5%
Hispanic or Latino (of any race)	6,851	10.8%

== Notable people ==
- Nathaniel Baldwin, the inventor of headphones
- Gordon B. Hinckley, late president of the LDS Church and once president of its East Millcreek Stake
- Sam Watson, professional rock climber and Olympic medalist
