= Millcreek Canyon (Salt Lake County, Utah) =

Canyon in Salt Lake County, Utah, United States

Coordinates: 40°41′21″N 111°47′07″W

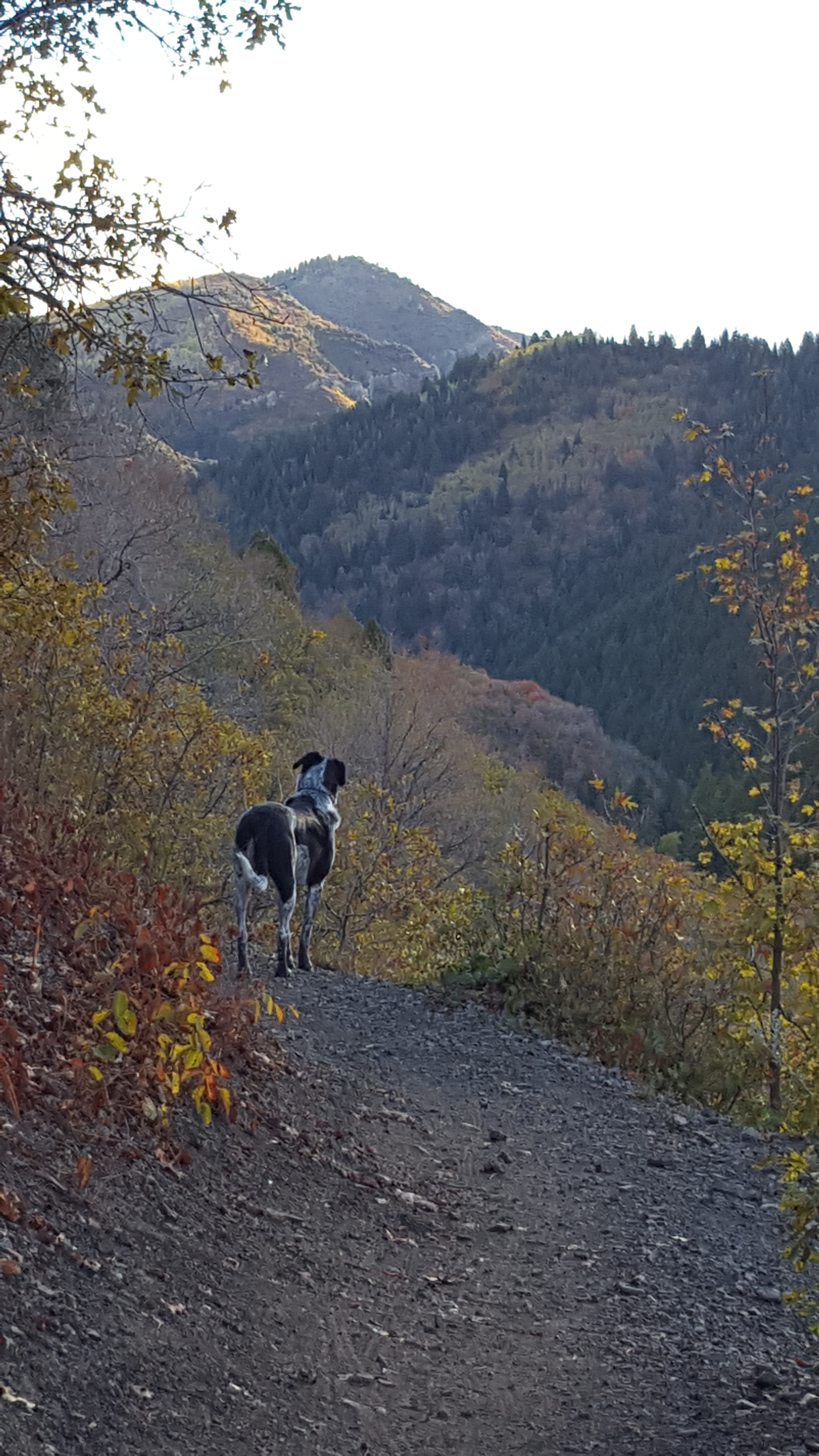
Millcreek Canyon

Millcreek Canyon (also Mill Creek Canyon) (Shoshoni: Tempin-Tekkoappah, “rock trap”) is a canyon in the Wasatch Mountains and part of Millcreek City on the east side of the Salt Lake Valley, Utah. It is a popular recreation area both in the summer and in the winter. It was named by Brigham Young on August 22, 1847, before all of the mills that were built in and below the densely forested canyon. It is home to two restaurants and six Boy Scout Day Camps.

Millcreek Canyon is next to Parley's Canyon on the north and Big Cottonwood Canyon on the south. Though perhaps the most accessible canyon to Salt Lake City, its upper reaches are much less visited than neighboring canyons.

== Recreation ==
=== Biking ===
The upper trails in Millcreek Canyon (those above the winter gate, which is located at the Maple Grove picnic area) are open to biking on even-numbered days only. Bikes are allowed on the lower trails on all days.

When riding on the road, bicycles are subject to the same laws as motor vehicles, including signalling before a turn and stopping at stop signs. For more information please consult the website http://RoadRespect.Utah.gov.

=== Dogs ===
Dogs are allowed in Millcreek canyon every day. They may be off leash on hiking trails on odd numbered days, but must still be leashed in all developed areas, including the road, trail heads, and picnic areas. On even numbered days dogs must always be leashed in all areas, including all hiking trails.

When the ski trail along the road in the upper canyon is groomed it is regulated as a trail and dogs may be off leash there on odd-numbered days. However, when the trail is not being maintained, it is considered a service road, even though it is closed to vehicles, and dogs must be leashed.

Dog owners are required to pick up after their dogs. There are receptacles for dog waste in several places in the canyon, including both upper and lower Big Water trailheads.

=== Hiking ===
Millcreek Canyon has a variety of trails for hiking. Difficulty ranges from easy (beginner) to difficult (advanced).

Popular trails include:

- The Pipeline Trail is popular for kids or beginning hikers. It can be accessed from multiple points (Rattlesnake, Church Fork, Burch Hollow and Elbow Fork Trailheads). The least strenuous access points are Elbow Fork and Burch Hollow. This trail is approximately 6.7 miles in length with an elevation gain of 800 feet.
- Desolation Trail to Salt Lake Overlook is accessed from the Desolation trailhead located just east of Millcreek Inn on the south side of the canyon. This a moderately strenuous hike that leads to a fantastic view of the Salt Lake Valley. The Overlook Trail is also a popular snowshoe trail in winter.
- The Grandeur Peak trail leads to Grandeur Peak (elev. 8299) and is accessed from the Church Fork Picnic area.
- The Dog Lake/Big Water trail is accessed from the Big Water trailhead at the top of Millcreek Canyon. This is a moderately difficult trail that is very popular for hikers and mountain bikers. Trail leads to Dog Lake and can also be accessed from the Mill D trailhead in Big Cottonwood Canyon.
- The Alexander Basin trail is accessed from the Alexander Basin trailhead, 8 miles up Millcreek Canyon on the south side of the road. In the summer months Alexander Basin can be filled with wildflowers and has views of the Millcreek (north) ridgeline and beyond. Gobblers Knob (10,246) can be reached from Alexander Basin. This is a steep and strenuous hike.
- The Mt. Aire Trail located at the confluence of Mill Creek Canyon, Mt. Aire Canyon, and Parley's Canyon. Hiking to the summit of Mt. Aire is a steep 1.8 miles with an elevation gain of almost 2,000 feet. The following elevation chart illustrates the trail’s consistently unrelenting slope.

== Access ==
The top half Millcreek Canyon is closed from November 1 through July 1 to vehicle traffic.

A $5.00 fee per vehicle is paid upon leaving Millcreek Canyon. Annual passes are $50.00 Seniors (age 60 and over) are charged only $3 per day, and may purchase an annual pass for $30. The interagency pass available from the National Park Service is not accepted in Millcreek Canyon.

== 2021 avalanche ==
On February 6, 2021, an avalanche occurred in the Wilson Glade area of the canyon, killing four skiers and injuring four others. The surviving skiers were able to dig themselves out of the snow and tried to rescue the other skiers, but to no avail. The canyon was subsequently closed to recreational use until further notice.

== See also ==
- List of canyons and gorges in Utah
