= National Register of Historic Places listings in Box Elder County, Utah =

Location of Box Elder County in Utah

This is a list of the National Register of Historic Places listings in Box Elder County, Utah.

This is intended to be a complete list of the properties and districts on the National Register of Historic Places in Box Elder County, Utah, United States. Latitude and longitude coordinates are provided for many National Register properties and districts; these locations may be seen together in a map.

There are 44 properties and districts listed on the National Register in the county. Another 4 sites in the county were once listed, but have since been removed.

This National Park Service list is complete through NPS recent listings posted July 10, 2026.

== Current listings ==
	Name on the Register	Image	Date listed	Location	City or town	Description
1	George and Mabel Anderson House	George and Mabel Anderson House	October 15, 2014 (#14000862)	63 North 200 East; 41°30′43″N 112°00′46″W	Brigham City	
2	Martin Anderson House	Martin Anderson House	January 23, 2003 (#02001735)	105 North 300 West; 41°30′48″N 112°01′12″W	Brigham City	
3	Bear River High School Science Building	Bear River High School Science Building	April 1, 1985 (#85000797)	1450 South Main Street; 41°43′33″N 112°09′43″W	Garland	
4	Box Elder County Courthouse	Box Elder County Courthouse	April 7, 1988 (#88000399)	1 North Main Street; 41°30′38″N 112°00′51″W	Brigham City	
5	Box Elder Stake Tabernacle	Box Elder Stake Tabernacle	May 14, 1971 (#71000840)	Main Street between 2nd and 3rd South streets 41°30′20″N 112°00′51″W	Brigham City	
6	Brigham City Carnegie Library	Brigham City Carnegie Library	October 25, 1984 (#84000143)	26 East Forest Street; 41°30′39″N 112°00′51″W	Brigham City	
7	Brigham City Fire Station/City Hall	Brigham City Fire Station/City Hall	April 7, 1988 (#88000389)	6 North Main Street; 41°30′39″N 112°00′53″W	Brigham City	
8	Brigham City Historic District		June 5, 2023 (#100008770)	Roughly bounded by 700 South, 500 East, 500 North and 300 and 500 West Sts. 41°30′36″N 112°00′57″W	Brigham City	
9	Brigham City Mercantile and Manufacturing Association Mercantile Store	Brigham City Mercantile and Manufacturing Association Mercantile Store	January 24, 1990 (#89000453)	5 North Main Street; 41°30′39″N 112°00′56″W	Brigham City	
10	Central Pacific Railroad Grade Historic District	Central Pacific Railroad Grade Historic District	May 15, 1987 (#87000699)	87-mile (140 km) segment between the Umbria Junction 9 miles (14 km) east of the Nevada border, around the northern end of Great Salt Lake, to the Golden Spike National Historical Park; 41°33′44″N 113°20′40″W	Park Valley vicinity	
11	Alma Compton House	Alma Compton House	April 7, 1988 (#88000381)	142 South 100 East; 41°30′25″N 112°00′49″W	Brigham City	
12	Corinne Methodist Episcopal Church	Corinne Methodist Episcopal Church	May 14, 1971 (#71000842)	Corner of Colorado Street and 4000 West; 41°32′51″N 112°06′40″W	Corinne	
13	Cutler Hydroelectric Power Plant Historic District	Cutler Hydroelectric Power Plant Historic District	April 20, 1989 (#89000280)	Off State Route 30 at the Bear River; 41°50′06″N 112°03′08″W	Beaver Dam vicinity	
14	Elberta Theatre	Elberta Theatre	October 17, 1991 (#91001544)	53 South Main Street; 41°30′33″N 112°00′52″W	Brigham City	
15	Alfred and Marie Fawson House	Alfred and Marie Fawson House	January 27, 2003 (#02001736)	64 South 100 West; 41°30′33″N 112°01′02″W	Brigham City	Demolished in 2025.
16	Peter and Anna Christena Forsgren House	Peter and Anna Christena Forsgren House	January 23, 2003 (#02001737)	59 South 100 East; 41°30′33″N 112°00′47″W	Brigham City	
17	Fryer Hotel	Fryer Hotel	April 7, 1988 (#88000379)	3274 West 11300 North; 41°42′56″N 112°05′46″W	Deweyville	
18	Garland Carnegie Library	Garland Carnegie Library	October 25, 1984 (#84000146)	86 West Factory Street; 41°44′29″N 112°09′46″W	Garland	
19	William and Nettie Glover House	William and Nettie Glover House	December 28, 2000 (#00001587)	106 West 100 North; 41°30′48″N 112°01′01″W	Brigham City	
20	Golden Spike National Historic Site	Golden Spike National Historic Site	October 15, 1966 (#66000080)	6200 North 22300 West; 41°36′31″N 112°33′20″W	Promontory	
21	Granary of the Relief Society	Granary of the Relief Society	January 24, 1990 (#89000455)	100 North 400 East; 41°30′46″N 112°00′29″W	Brigham City	
22	Hampton's Ford Stage Stop and Barn	Hampton's Ford Stage Stop and Barn	August 12, 1971 (#71000841)	3605 West Bigler Road; 41°47′14″N 112°06′18″W	Collinston vicinity	Now the Old Barn Community Theatre
23	Hogup Cave (42BO36)	Hogup Cave (42BO36)	May 8, 1986 (#86001016)	Address Restricted	Park Valley vicinity	A cave showing signs of human occupation from about 6500 BC to AD 1470
24	Holmgren Farmstead	Holmgren Farmstead	April 5, 2001 (#01000319)	460 North 300 East; 41°42′59″N 112°09′31″W	Tremonton	
25	Christian and Annie Holst House	Christian and Annie Holst House	January 27, 2003 (#02001738)	495 South 200 East; 41°30′04″N 112°00′42″W	Brigham City	
26	Hotel Brigham	Hotel Brigham	October 17, 1991 (#91001543)	13 and 17 West Forest Street; 41°30′37″N 112°00′55″W	Brigham City	
27	Howard Hotel	Howard Hotel	October 7, 1994 (#94001209)	35 South Main Street; 41°30′35″N 112°00′53″W	Brigham City	
28	Nels and Minnie Jenson House	Nels and Minnie Jenson House	December 28, 2000 (#00001588)	136 East 100 South; 41°30′28″N 112°00′45″W	Brigham City	
29	Jeppson-Reeder House	Jeppson-Reeder House	February 27, 2003 (#03000082)	631 North Main Street; 41°31′25″N 112°00′55″W	Brigham City	
30	Knudson Brothers Building	Knudson Brothers Building	July 16, 1992 (#92000893)	63 South Main Street; 41°30′34″N 112°00′52″W	Brigham City	
31	Jonathan and Jennie Knudson House	Jonathan and Jennie Knudson House	December 28, 2000 (#00001583)	48 South 100 East; 41°30′32″N 112°00′49″W	Brigham City	
32	Lower Bear River Archeological Discontiguous District		February 13, 1986 (#86000249)	Address Restricted	Brigham City vicinity	
33	Mountain States Telephone and Telegraph Building	Mountain States Telephone and Telegraph Building	December 27, 1996 (#96001530)	20 East 100 South; 41°30′28″N 112°00′52″W	Brigham City	
34	Oregon Short Line Depot	Oregon Short Line Depot	July 16, 1992 (#92000891)	800 West and Forest Street; 41°30′37″N 112°01′43″W	Brigham City	
35	Plymouth School	Plymouth School	April 9, 1986 (#86000733)	135 South Main Street; 41°52′31″N 112°08′45″W	Plymouth	
36	Spiral Jetty	Spiral Jetty	November 15, 2024 (#100011066)	North Shore of the Great Salt Lake; 41°26′16″N 112°40′08″W	Grouse Creek vicinity	
37	A. N. Tanner House	A. N. Tanner House	February 11, 1982 (#82004107)	Grouse Creek Road; 41°42′09″N 113°53′30″W	Grouse Creek	
38	Thompson-Hansen House	Thompson-Hansen House	December 23, 1994 (#94001474)	120 North Main Street; 41°30′54″N 112°00′51″W	Brigham City	
39	Transcontinental Railroad Grade	Transcontinental Railroad Grade	December 8, 1994 (#94001423)	Roughly from 6 miles (9.7 km) west of Corinne running approximately 13 miles (21 km) along State Route 83; 41°36′55″N 112°20′41″W	Corinne vicinity	
40	Tremonton Historic District		April 26, 2021 (#100006013)	Roughly bounded by 600 South, 400 West, 800 North, and 300 East; 41°42′42″N 112°09′58″W	Tremonton	
41	Union Block	Union Block	October 17, 1991 (#91001545)	57 South Main Street; 41°30′32″N 112°00′52″W	Brigham City	
42	Washakie LDS Ward Chapel	Washakie LDS Ward Chapel	June 3, 1998 (#98000641)	Along Samaria Lake Canal; 41°56′38″N 112°13′06″W	Washakie	
43	William L. and Mary Watkins House	William L. and Mary Watkins House	May 2, 2001 (#01000471)	74 North 100 East; 41°30′44″N 112°00′47″W	Brigham City	
44	Willard Historic District	Willard Historic District	June 25, 1974 (#74001933)	Roughly bounded by 200 West, 200 North, 100 East, and 200 South streets 41°24′33″N 112°02′09″W	Willard	

== Former listings ==
	Name on the Register	Image	Date listed	Date removed	Location	City or town	Description
1	Box Elder Flouring Mill	Box Elder Flouring Mill	January 24, 1990 (#89000452)	August 15, 2023	327 East 200 North; 41°30′55″N 112°00′32″W	Brigham City	
2	Box Elder High School Gymnasium	Box Elder High School Gymnasium	April 1, 1985 (#85000796)	August 27, 2013	18 N. 400 East; 41°30′39″N 112°00′29″W	Brigham City	Box Elder School District demolished this building in 2011.
3	Planing Mill of Brigham City Mercantile and Manufacturing Association	Planing Mill of Brigham City Mercantile and Manufacturing Association	January 24, 1990 (#89000454)	March 26, 2018	547 E. Forest St. 41°30′39″N 112°00′21″W	Brigham City	A surviving building of the Brigham City Co-op.
4	Southern Pacific Railroad: Ogden-Lucin Cut-Off Trestle	Southern Pacific Railroad: Ogden-Lucin Cut-Off Trestle	April 14, 1972 (#72001257)	October 23, 2018	30 miles (48 km) west of Ogden at the northern arm of the Great Salt Lake; 41°13′08″N 112°41′30″W	Ogden vicinity	

== See also ==
- List of National Historic Landmarks in Utah
- National Register of Historic Places listings in Utah
