= Union Block =

Union Block may refer to:

- Union Block (Mount Pleasant, Iowa)
- Union Block (Fort Scott, Kansas), listed on the NRHP in Bourbon County, Kansas
- Union Block (Oskaloosa, Kansas)
- Union Block (Lewiston, Maine)
- Union Block (Buchanan, Michigan)
- Union Block (Saline, Michigan)
- Union Block (Mayville, North Dakota)
- Union Block (Nunda, New York)
- Union Block (Lima, Ohio)
- Union Block (Newberg, Oregon), listed on the NRHP in Yamhill County, Oregon
- Union Block (Brigham City, Utah)

== See also ==
- Union Block and Montandon Buildings, Boise, Idaho
- Union blockade
