= A. N. Tanner House =

- U.S. National Register of Historic Places
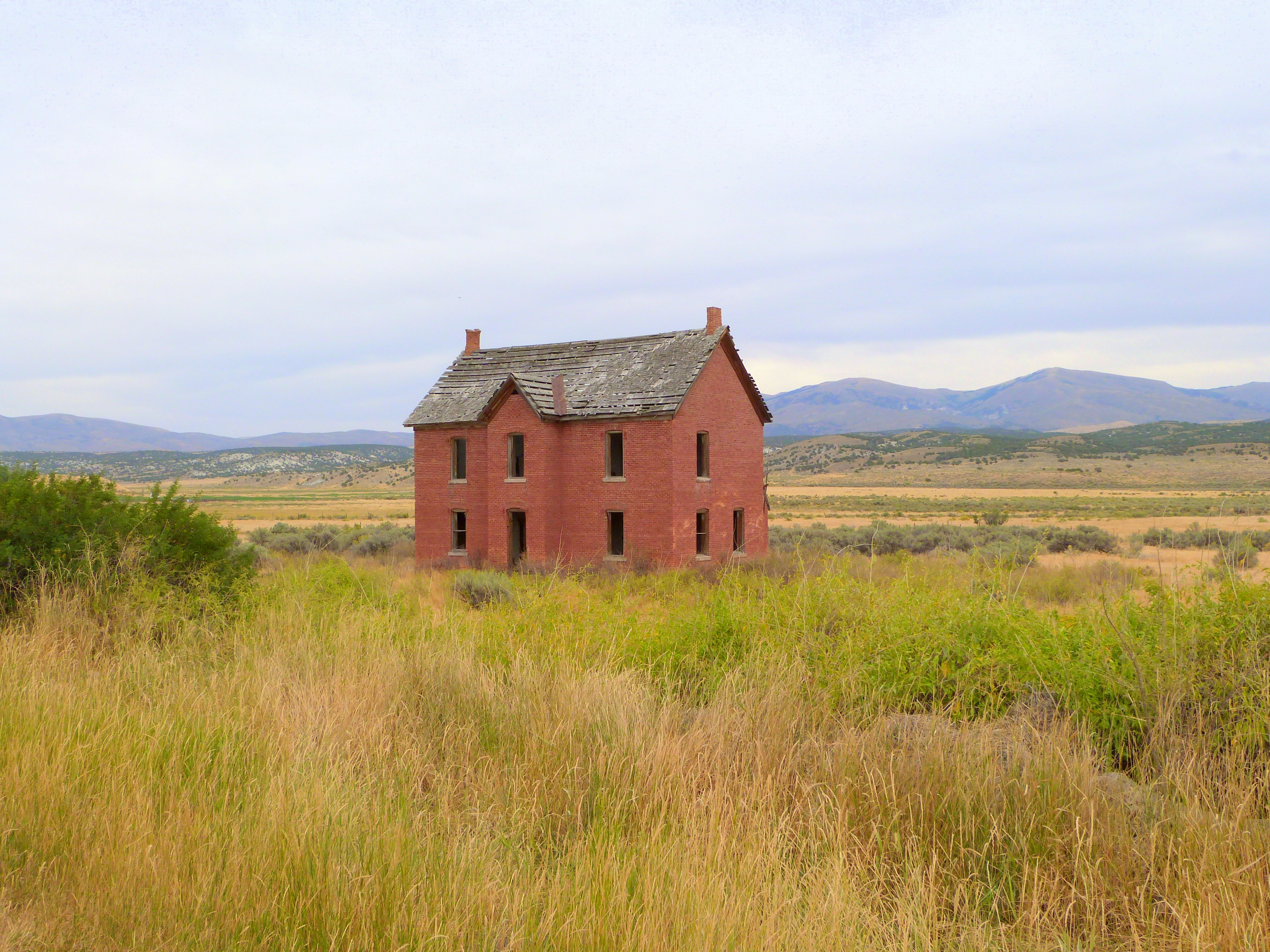
- The house in 2016

- Location within Utah Location within the United States
- Location: Grouse Creek, Grouse Creek, Utah
- Coordinates: 41°42′10″N 113°53′27″W
- Area: 2 acres (0.81 ha)
- Built: 1899
- Architectural style: Georgian, Late Georgian Vernacular
- NRHP reference No.: 82004107
- Added to NRHP: February 11, 1982

The A. N. Tanner House is a historic two-story house in the unincorporated community of Grouse Creek, Utah. It was built with red bricks in 1899 by Allen N. Tanner, a farmer who lived here with his wife, née Mary Emily Barlow, and their nine children; the Tanners were Mormons. The house was designed in the Georgian Revival architectural style. Tanner died in 1935, and the house remained in his family until the 1980s. The house has since been abandoned and is at risk of collapse due to neglect. It has been listed on the National Register of Historic Places since February 11, 1982.
