= Howard Hotel =

Howard Hotel may refer to:

- Howard Hotel (New York), a hotel in New York City, New York, United States
- Howard Hotel (Utah), a historic hotel in Brigham City, Utah, United States
