= Jonathan and Jennie Knudson House =

- U.S. National Register of Historic Places
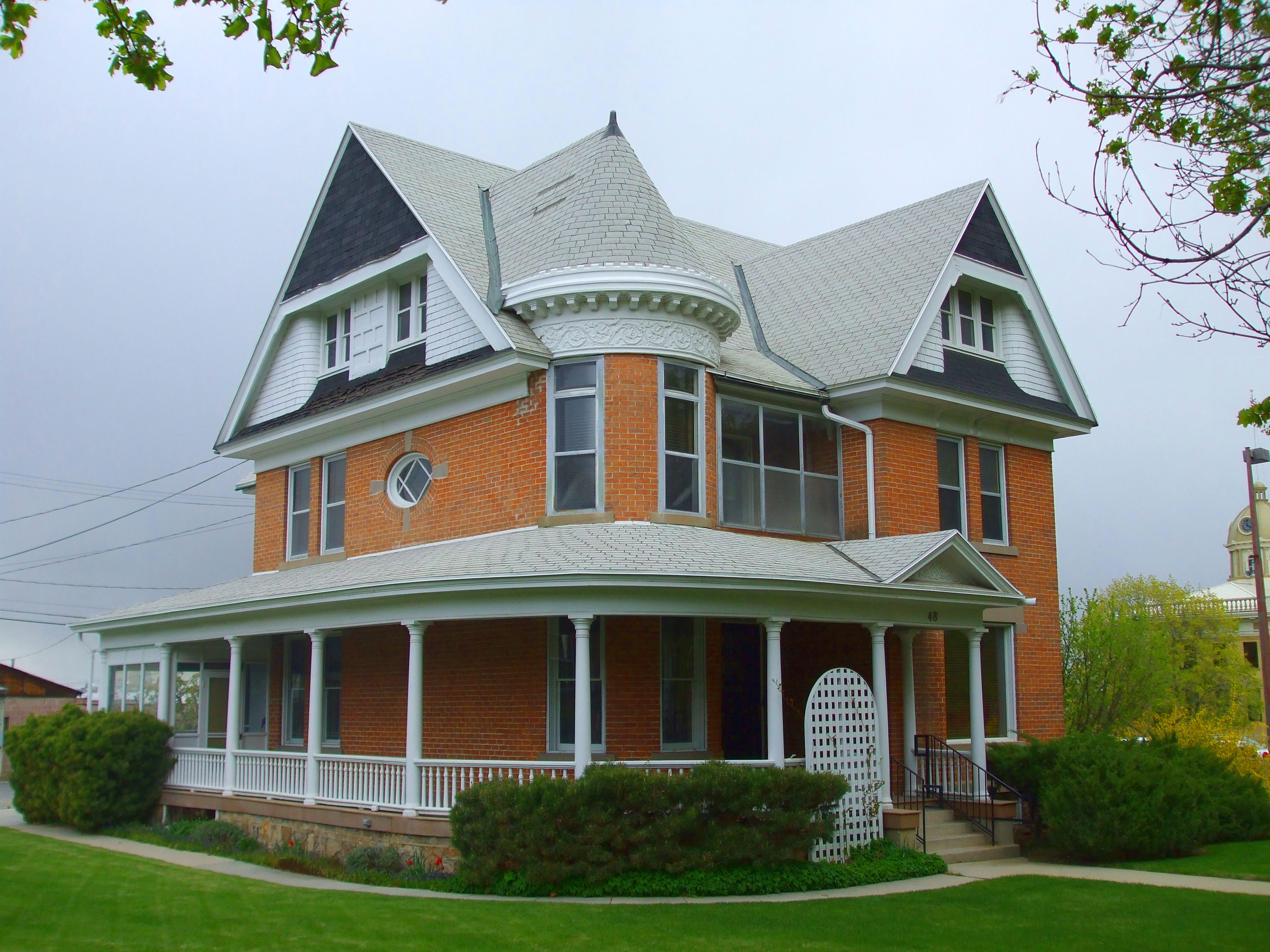
- The house in 2010

- Location within Utah Location within the United States
- Location: 48 South 100 East, Brigham City, Utah
- Coordinates: 41°30′32″N 112°00′49″W
- Area: 0.5 acres (0.20 ha)
- Built: 1898
- Architectural style: Victorian Eclectic
- MPS: Brigham City MPS
- NRHP reference No.: 00001583
- Added to NRHP: December 28, 2000

The Jonathan and Jennie Knudson House is a historic house in Brigham City, Utah. It was built in 1898–1901 by Jonathan Chester Knudson, a Mormon businessman whose father was a Danish-born convert to the Church of Jesus Christ of Latter-day Saints. Knudson lived here with his wife, née Jennie Ellen Pritchard. In the 1930s, the house was inherited by their son, Jonathan Chester Knudson Jr., also a Mormon businessman, who lived here with his wife, Lucille. It was later deeded to their son, Jake, who lived here with his Japanese wife, Tomie Kono, a Tenrikyo minister. The house remained in the Knudson family until 1998.

The house was designed in the Victorian Eclectic style, with Queen Anne, Shingle and Neoclassical features. It has been listed on the National Register of Historic Places since December 28, 2000.
