= Peter and Anna Christena Forsgren House =

- U.S. National Register of Historic Places
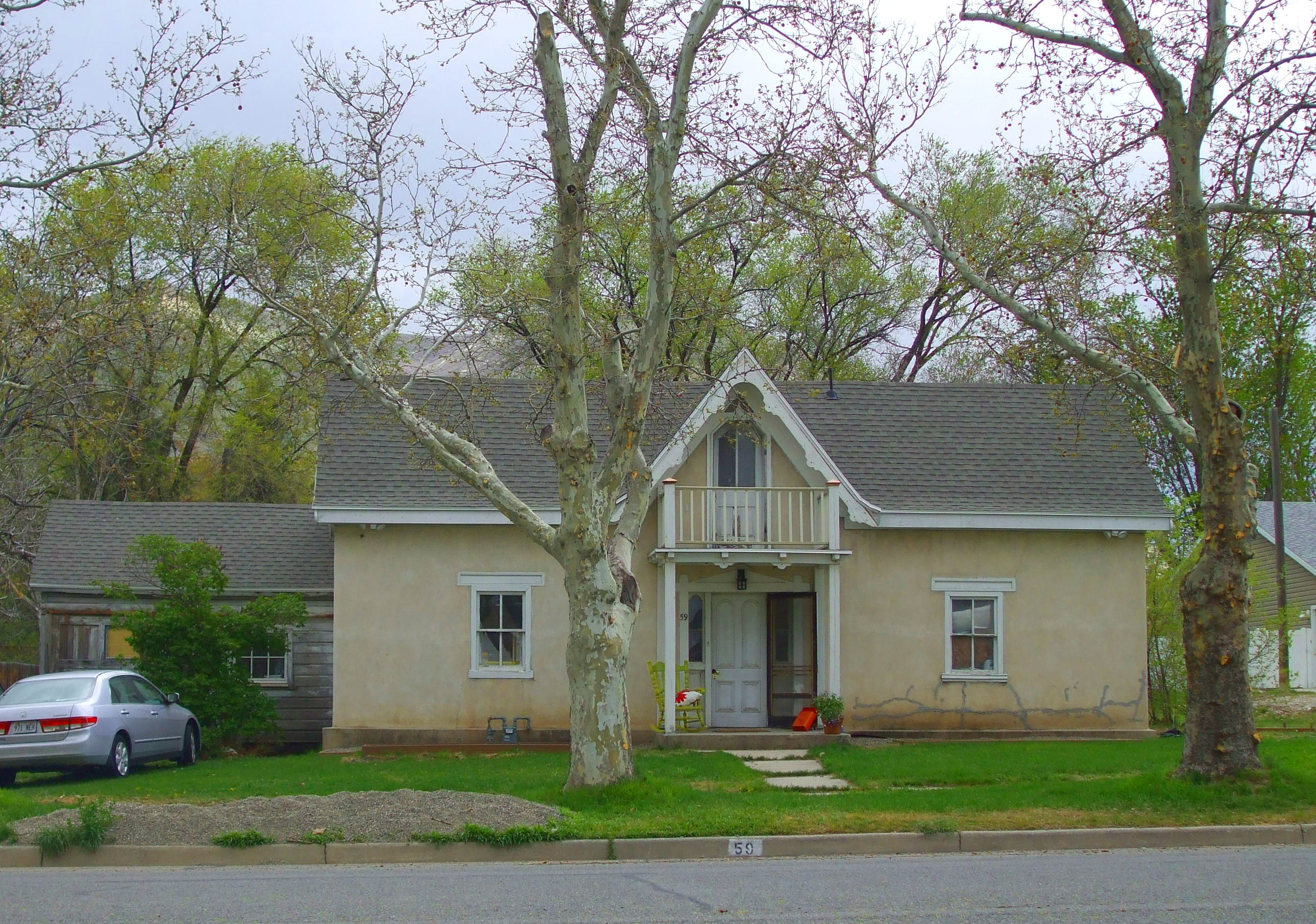
- The house in 2010

- Location within Utah Location within the United States
- Location: 59 South 100 East, Brigham City, Utah
- Coordinates: 41°30′33″N 112°00′47″W
- Area: 0.3 acres (0.12 ha)
- Built: 1857
- Built by: Peter A. Forsgren
- Architectural style: Gothic Revival
- NRHP reference No.: 02001737
- Added to NRHP: January 23, 2003

The Peter and Anna Christena Forsgren House is a historic house in Brigham City, Utah. It was built in 1863 by Peter Adolph Forsgren, an immigrant from Sweden who converted to the Church of Jesus Christ of Latter-day Saints at the age of 36, while he was living in Boston, Massachusetts. His brother, John E. Forsgren, who became the first Mormon missionary to preach in Sweden, played a leading role in his conversion. Forsgren became a weaver of cloth, blankets and carpets in Brigham City, and he designed a carpet for the Logan Utah Temple. This house was designed in the Gothic Revival architectural style. Even though Peter had two wives, his second wife is unlikely to have lived here with him. Forsgren therefore lived here with his first wife, also known as his sister wife, Anna Christena, and the house was deeded to their children, purchased by a daughter, sold out of the family in 1920. The new homeowner, Peter Nelson Pierce, was a trader between Native Americans and Mormon settlers who served as the local Mormon bishop and later became the police chief. The house has been listed on the National Register of Historic Places since January 23, 2003.
