= William L. and Mary Watkins House =

- U.S. National Register of Historic Places
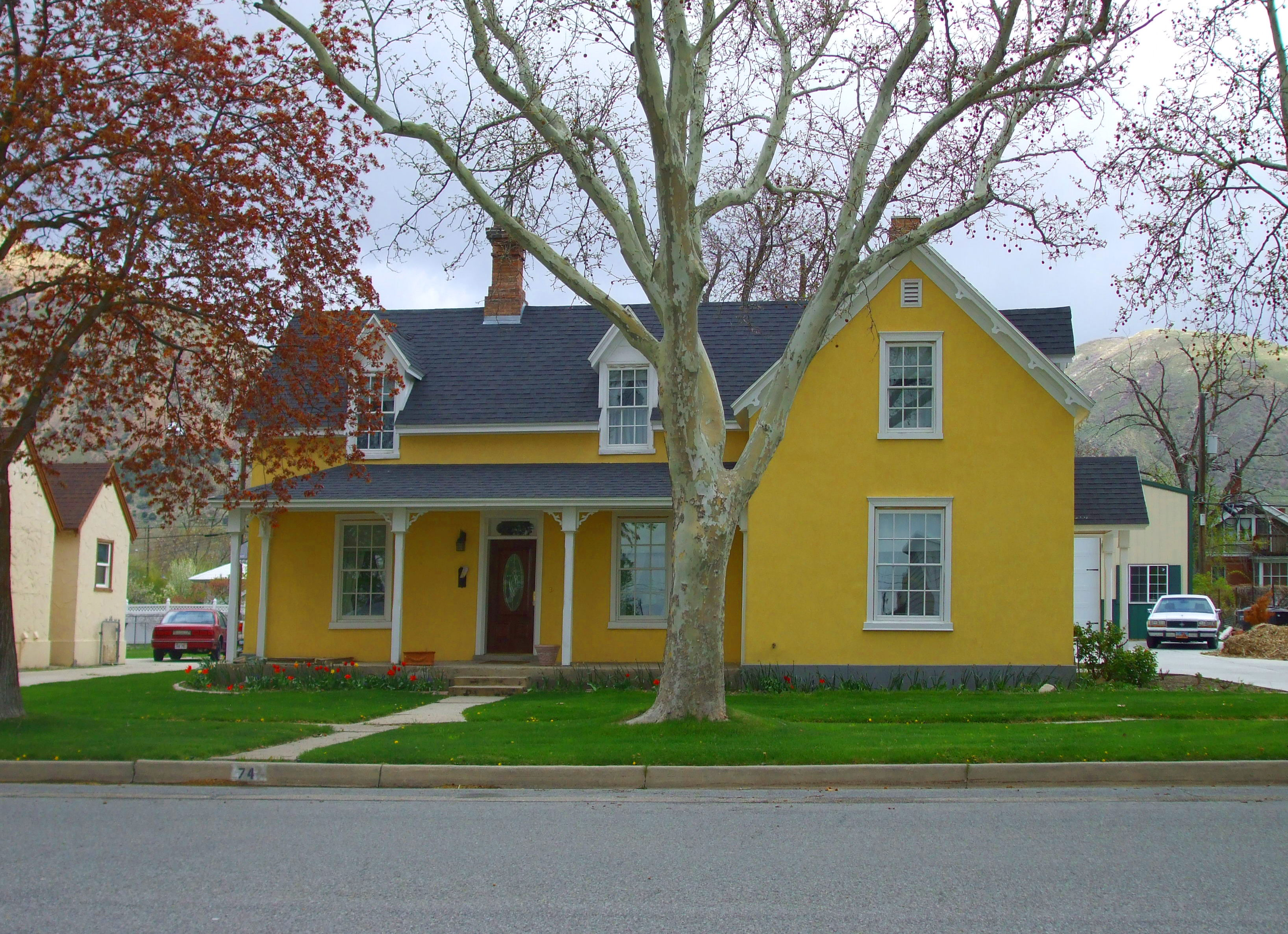

- Location within Utah Location within the United States
- Location: 74 N. 100 E, Brigham City, Utah
- Coordinates: 41°30′44″N 112°0′47″W
- Area: 0.3 acres (0.12 ha)
- Built: c.1862
- Architectural style: Gothic Revival
- MPS: Brigham City MPS
- NRHP reference No.: 01000471
- Added to NRHP: May 2, 2001

The William L. and Mary Watkins House in Brigham City, Utah is a historic house built around 1862. It was listed on the National Register of Historic Places in 2001.

It is a one-and-a-half-story Gothic Revival-style cross-wing adobe and stucco house. It is notable for being one of the largest historic houses in the city, and for its architecture, and for its state of preservation.

William Watkins was a charter member and a leader of the Brigham City Co-op.
