= Knudson Brothers Building =

- U.S. National Register of Historic Places
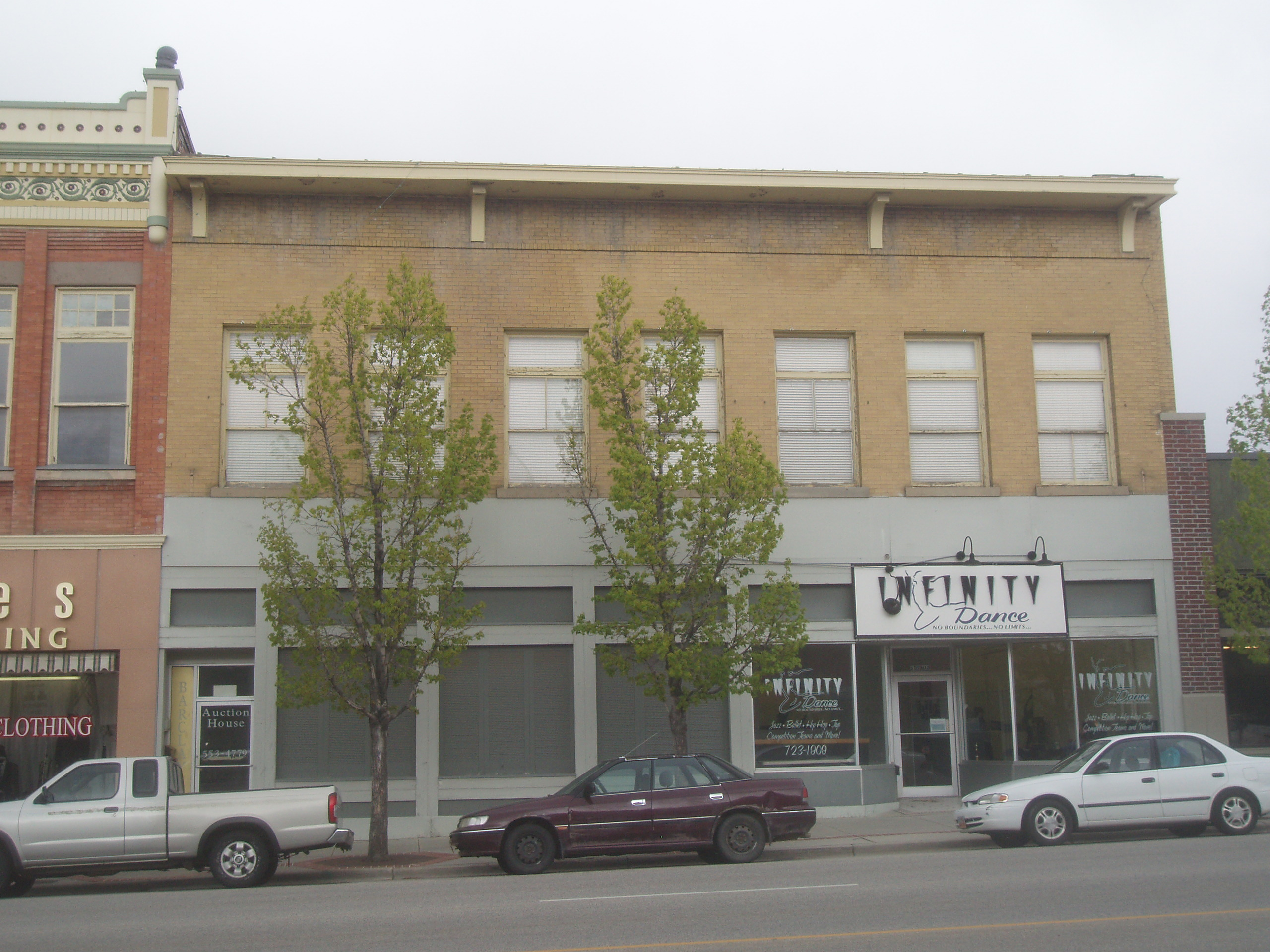
- The building in 2010

- Location within Utah Location within the United States
- Location: 63 South Main Street, Brigham City, Utah
- Coordinates: 41°30′34″N 112°00′52″W
- Area: 0.2 acres (0.081 ha)
- Built: 1914
- Architectural style: Chicago, The Commercial Style
- MPS: Brigham City MPS
- NRHP reference No.: 92000893
- Added to NRHP: July 16, 1992

The Knudson Brothers Building is a historic two-story commercial building in Brigham City, Utah. It was built in 1914 by Charles W. and Jonathan C. Knudson, and designed in the Chicago school style, with Neoclassical features. It is "55.5 feet wide by 100 feet deep with a small frame addition on the rear." It has been listed on the National Register of Historic Places since July 16, 1992.
