= Alma Compton House =

- U.S. National Register of Historic Places
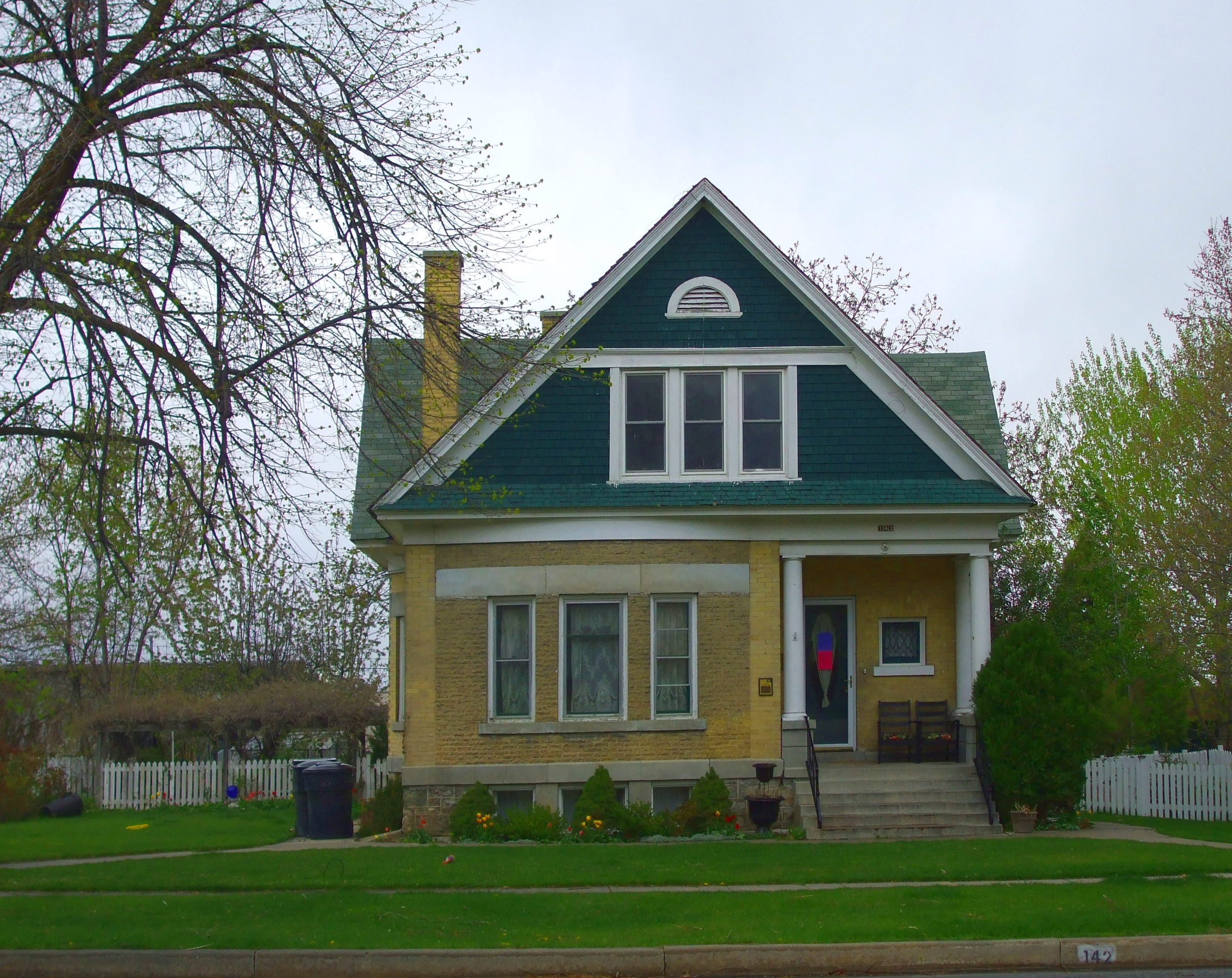
- The house in 2010j

- Location within Utah Location within the United States
- Location: 142 South 100 East, Brigham City, Utah
- Coordinates: 41°30′25″N 112°00′49″W
- Area: 0.4 acres (0.16 ha)
- Built: 1908
- Architect: Andrew Funk,
- Architectural style: Late Victorian, Victorian cottage
- NRHP reference No.: 88000381
- Added to NRHP: April 7, 1988

The Alma Compton House is a historic house in Brigham City, Utah. It was built in 1908 as a cottage for Alma Compton, an immigrant from England, and designed in the Victorian style. Compton, who became a professional photographer in Brigham City, lived here with his wife, née Jane E. Dalton, his son Matthew, and his two daughters. The Comptons were Mormons. The house has been listed on the National Register of Historic Places since April 7, 1988. The Compton Studio Photographs collection at Utah State University includes "over 100,000 original photographic negatives."
