= Elberta Theatre =

- U.S. National Register of Historic Places
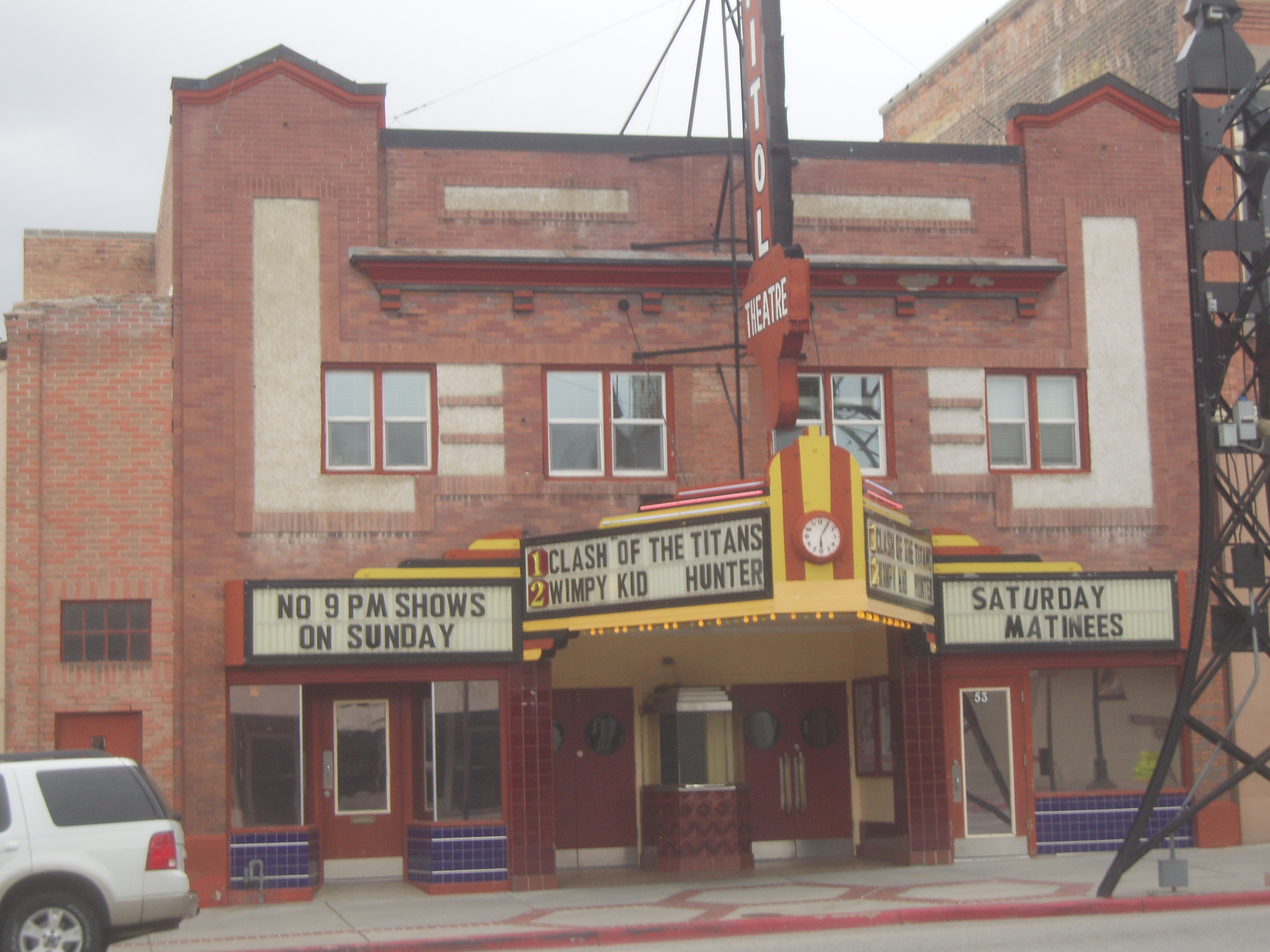
- The theatre in 2010

- Location within Utah
- Location: 53 South Main Street, Brigham City, Utah
- Coordinates: 41°30′33″N 112°00′52″W
- Area: 0.2 acres (0.081 ha)
- Built: 1917
- Built by: Richard Christensen, T.W. Whitaker
- Architectural style: Prairie School
- MPS: Brigham City MPS
- NRHP reference No.: 91001544
- Added to NRHP: October 17, 1991

The Elberta Theatre is a historic two-story building in Brigham City, Utah. It was built with red bricks and stucco in 1917 by William R. Dredge and W.H. Shurtliffe, and it was designed in the Prairie School style. It has been listed on the National Register of Historic Places since October 17, 1991.
