= Plymouth School =

- U.S. National Register of Historic Places
- Location within Utah
- Location: 135 S. Main, Plymouth, Utah
- Coordinates: 41°52′31″N 112°08′45″W
- Area: 1.2 acres (0.49 ha)
- Built: 1934
- Built by: Thompson, Elijah
- Architectural style: Tudor Revival
- MPS: Public Works Buildings TR
- NRHP reference No.: 86000733
- Added to NRHP: April 9, 1986

The Plymouth School, at 135 S. Main in Plymouth, Utah, was built as a public works project in 1934. It was listed on the National Register of Historic Places in 1986.

It was built by Elijah Thompson and is Tudor Revival in style.
