= Brigham City Co-op =

The Brigham City Co-op was one of the most successful cooperative enterprises of the Mormons in Utah.

In 1990 five buildings associated with the Brigham City Co-op survived: the Mercantile Store (1891), the Flour Mill (1856), the Woolen Mill (1869–70), the Planing Mill (c.1876), and the Relief Society Granary (c.1877).

== Mercantile store ==
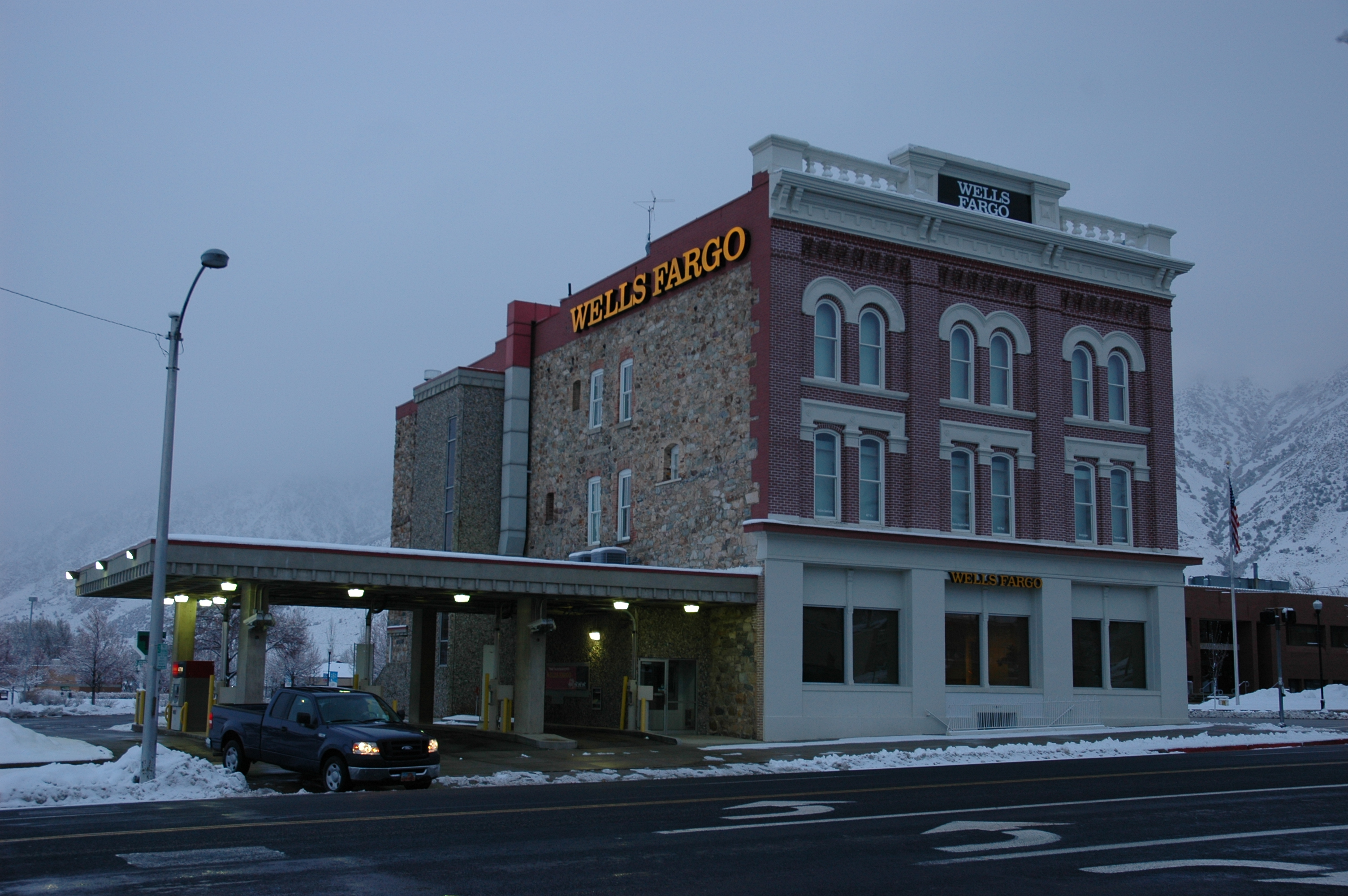
Store in 2010

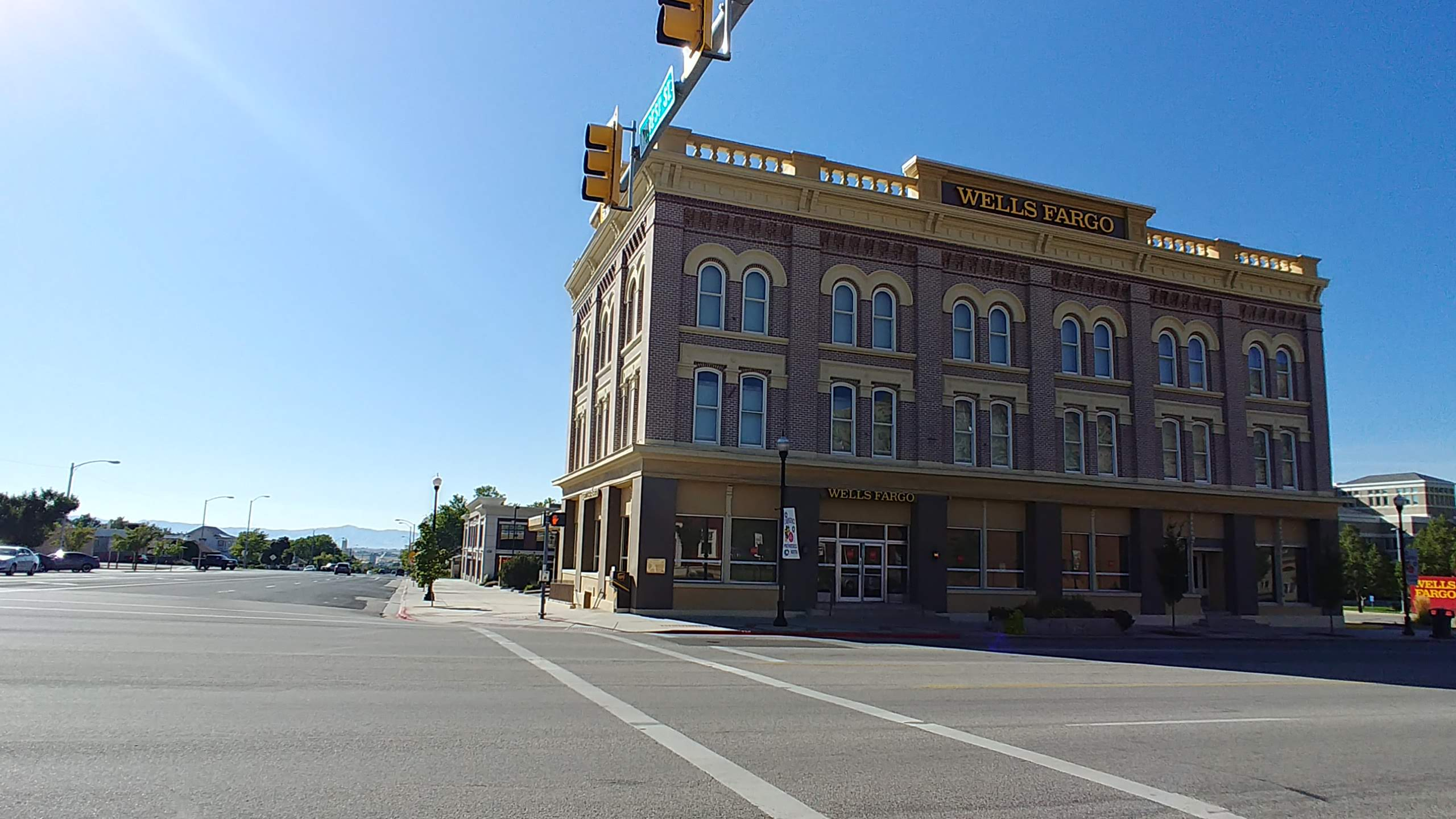
Brigham City Mercantile and Manufacturing Association Mercantile Store

- Brigham City Mercantile and Manufacturing Association Mercantile Store
- U.S. National Register of Historic Places
- Location: 5 N. Main St., Brigham City, Utah
- Coordinates: 41°30′39″N 112°0′56″W
- Area: 0.5 acres (0.20 ha)
- Built: 1890-1891
- Built by: Brigham City Co-op
- Architect: St. James, Woods & Co.
- Architectural style: Romanesque
- MPS: Brigham City MPS
- NRHP reference No.: 89000453
- Added to NRHP: January 24, 1990

The Brigham City Mercantile and Manufacturing Association Mercantile Store, at 5 N. Main St. in Brigham City, Utah, also known as the Brigham City Co-op Mercantile Store or the First Security Bank, was built during 1890-1891. It was listed on the National Register of Historic Places in 1990.

It was designed by Ogden, Utah architects St. James, Woods & Co. It has a 50 by 80 feet (15 m × 24 m) room on its third floor which was used for dances and other events.

The building "is significant primarily for its association with the Mormon Church-sponsored Brigham City Mercantile and Manufacturing Association (the Co-op). The Co-op was a highly successful socio-economic system that dominated the local economy during most of its years of operation, 1864-1895. It was also a model for Mormon cooperatives established throughout the Utah Territory in the 1860s-80s. Most of the other co-ops failed quickly, and none approached the level of success attained in Brigham City."

A fire at the store on December 19, 1894 contributed to failure of the Co-op in 1895. The building later served as a bank.

The NRHP nomination states the building "is also architecturally significant as the best example of Victorian Eclectic commercial architecture in Brigham City."

== Flouring mill ==
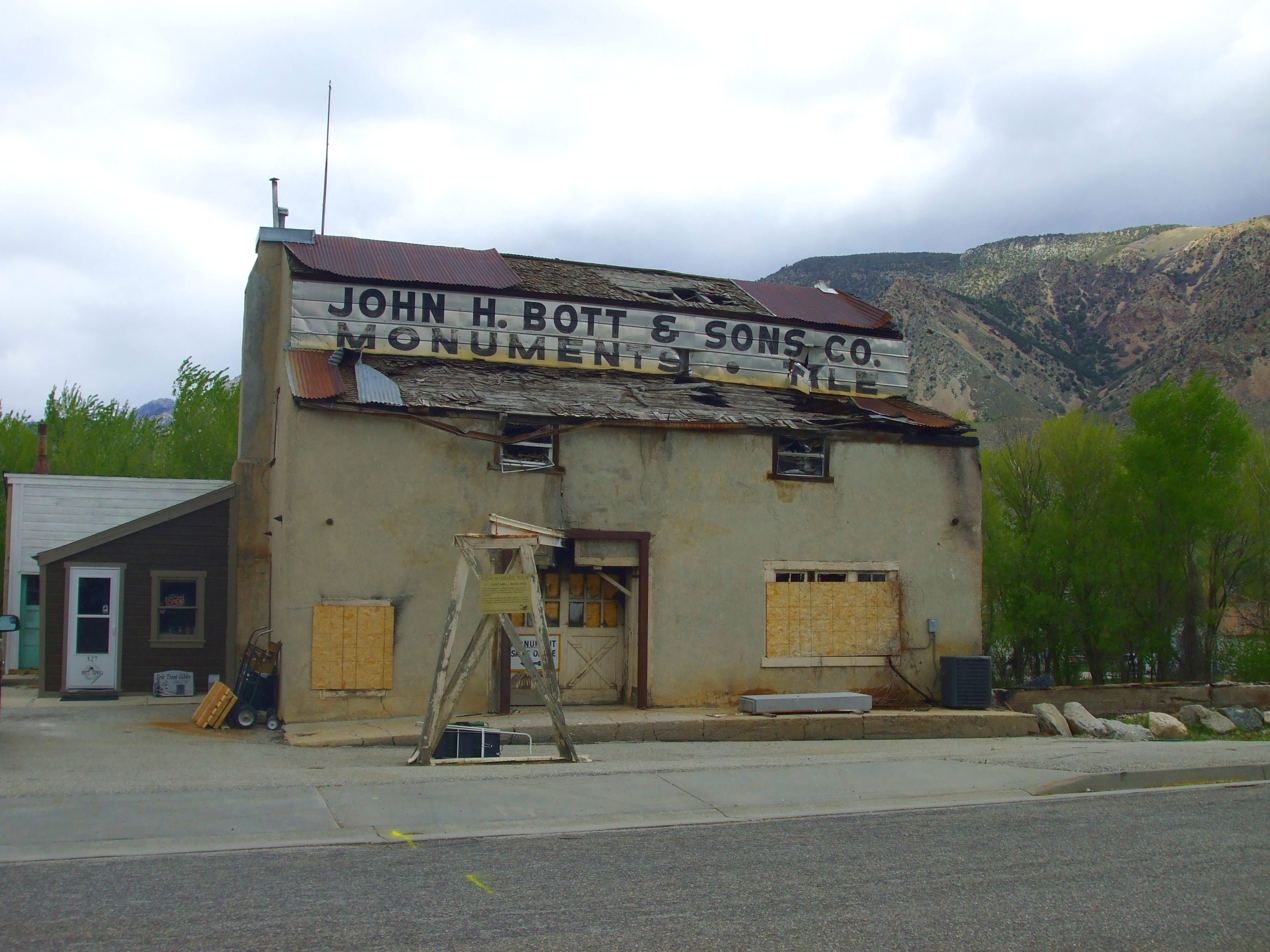
Flouring mill

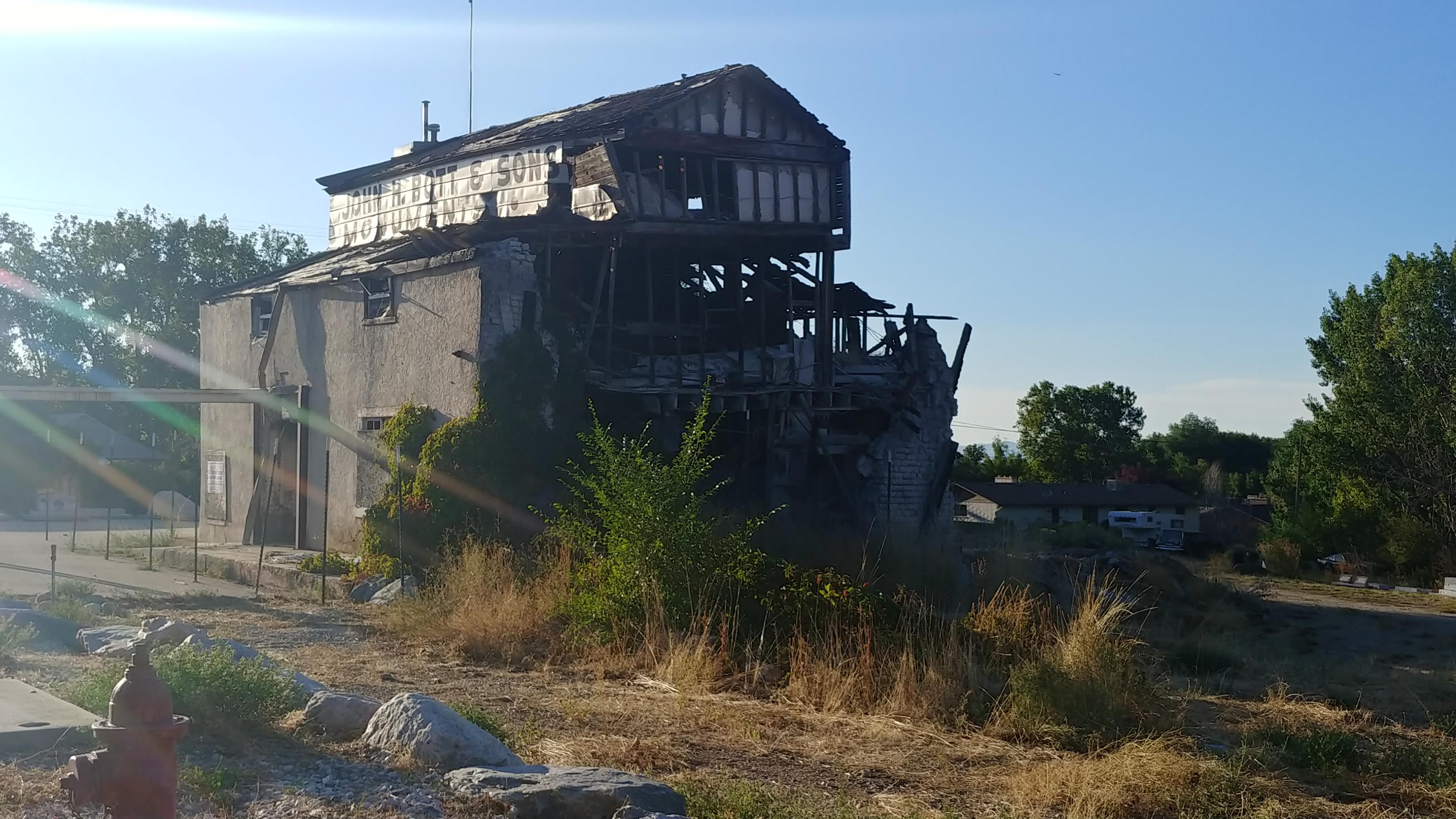
Backside of the Box Elder Flouring Mill in 2019

- Box Elder Flouring Mill
- Formerly listed on the U.S. National Register of Historic Places
- Location: 327 East 200 North, Brigham City, Utah
- Coordinates: 41°30′55″N 112°0′32″W
- Area: 1.2 acres (0.49 ha)
- Built: 1857
- Built by: Kessler, Frederick; Et al.
- Architectural style: Industrial vernacular
- MPS: Brigham City MPS
- NRHP reference No.: 89000452

Significant dates
- Added to NRHP: January 24, 1990
- Removed from NRHP: August 15, 2023

The Box Elder flouring mill was built in 1857 and served as a flour mill into the 1870s. It was a two-story 30 by 39 feet (9.1 m × 11.9 m) building. The building was sold and began use as a monument factory in the 1890s, and remains a monument factory in 1989. It was expanded by additions during about 1892 to 1933, including a c.1933 two-story frame addition which is 32 by 120 feet (9.8 m × 36.6 m) in plan.

The mill had portholes intended for defense from Indian attacks, in its first story walls on the west, north and south sides. These were changed into windows and a door by John H. Bott during his ownership during the 1890s to 1914.

It has also been known as the Gristmill, and as Snow and Smith Mill and as Bott's Monument Factory. It was listed on the National Register of Historic Places as Box Elder Flouring Mill, and was delisted in 2023.

It was water-powered by Box Elder Creek.

== Granary ==
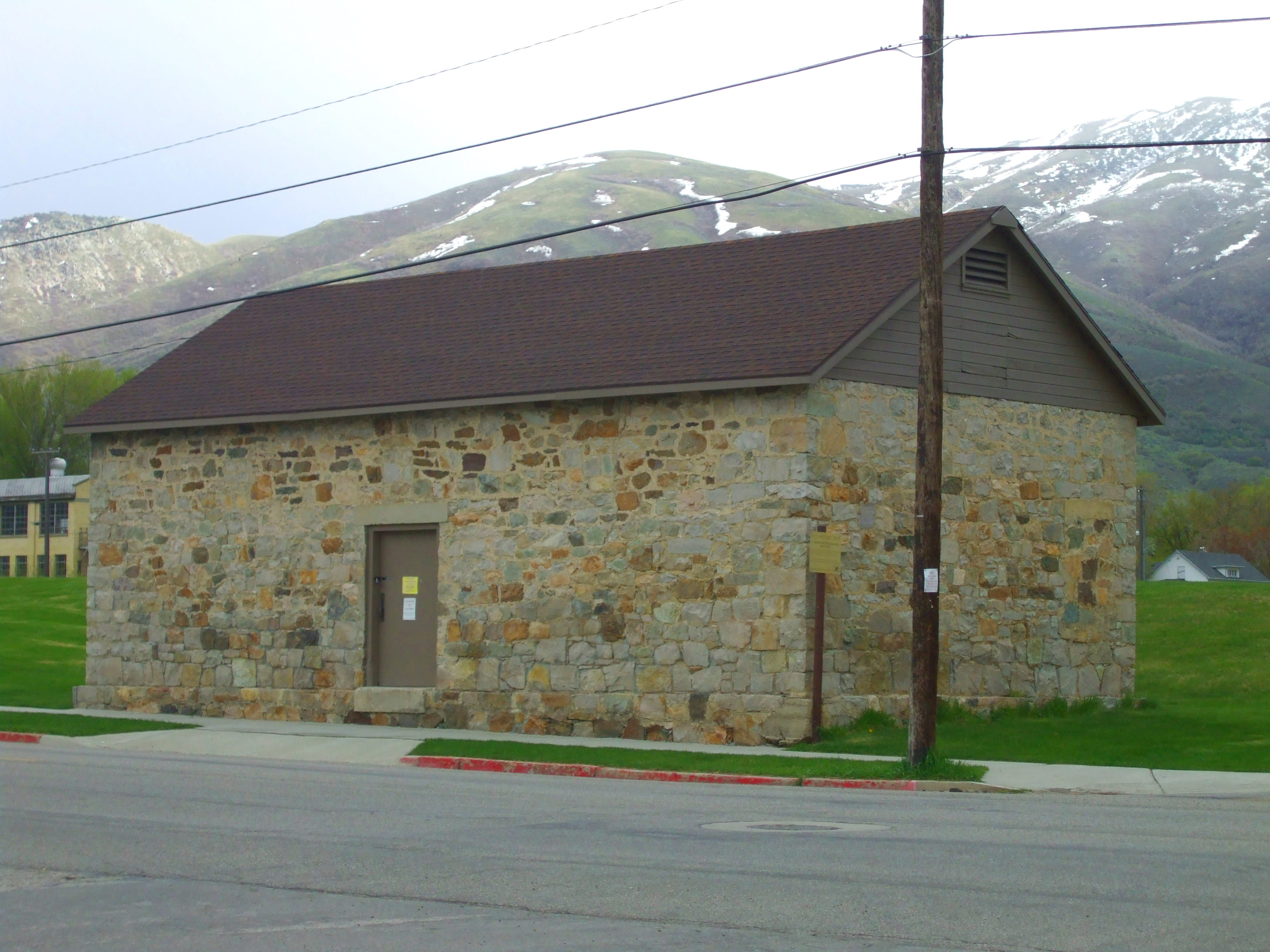
Granary

- Granary of the Relief Society
- U.S. National Register of Historic Places
- Location: 100 North 400 East, Brigham City, Utah
- Coordinates: 41°30′46″N 112°0′29″W
- Area: 0.1 acres (0.040 ha)
- Built: 1877
- Built by: Brigham City Co-op
- Architectural style: Vernacular industrial
- MPS: Brigham City MPS
- NRHP reference No.: 89000455
- Added to NRHP: January 24, 1990

The granary was built in 1877. It was NRHP-listed as Granary of the Relief Society in 1990.

== Planing mill ==
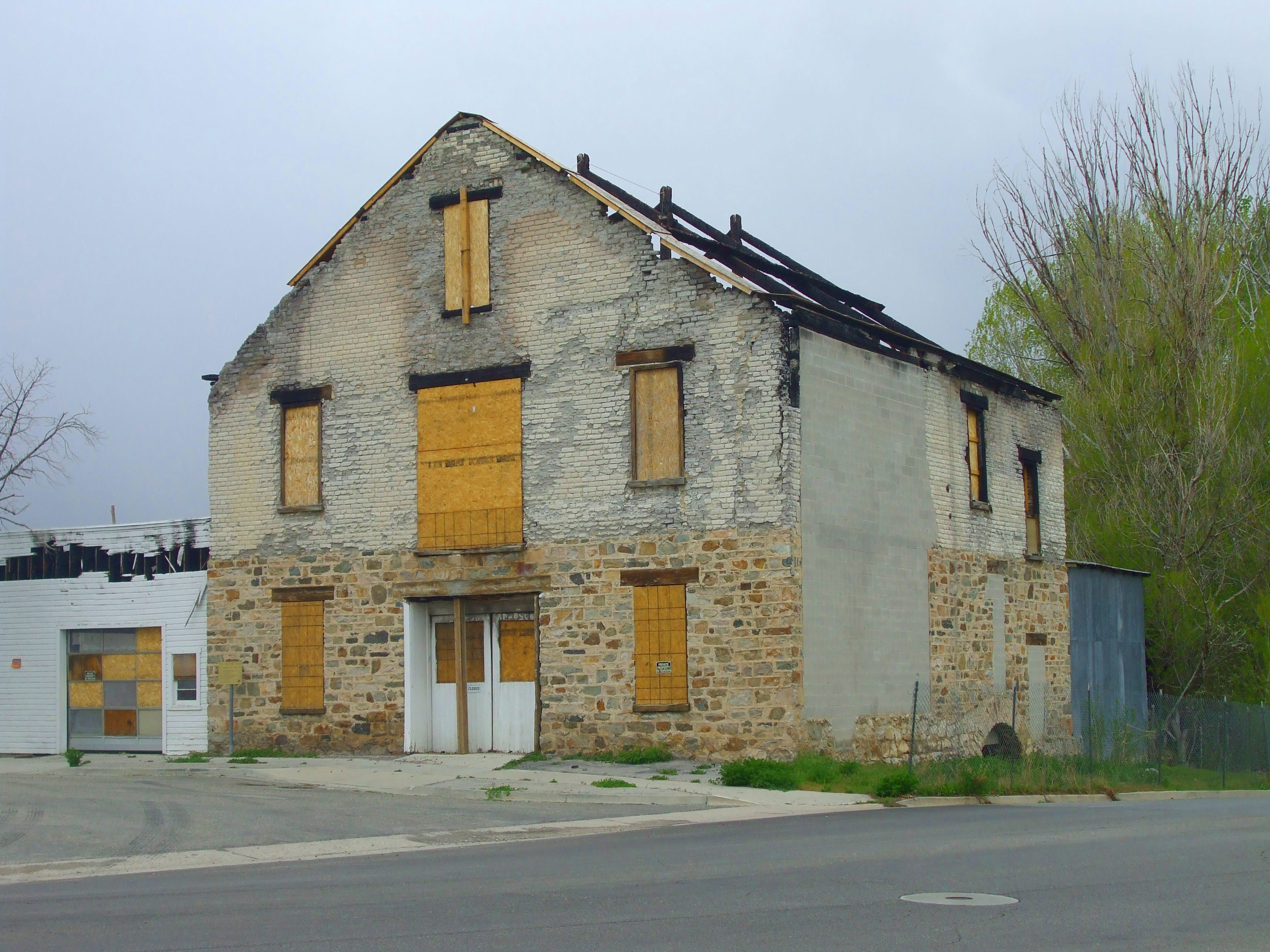
Planing mill

- Planing Mill of Brigham City Mercantile and Manufacturing Association
- Formerly listed on the U.S. National Register of Historic Places
- Location: 547 E. Forest St., Brigham City, Utah
- Coordinates: 41°30′39″N 112°0′21″W
- Area: 0.5 acres (0.20 ha)
- Built: 1876
- Built by: James Pett; Brigham City Co-op
- Architectural style: Industrial vernacular
- MPS: Brigham City MPS
- NRHP reference No.: 89000454

Significant dates
- Added to NRHP: January 24, 1990
- Removed from NRHP: March 26, 2018

The planing mill was built in 1876. It is NRHP-listed as Planing Mill of Brigham City Mercantile and Manufacturing Association. It was also known as Merrell's Planing Mill.

It was water-powered.

John F. Merrell, a worker at the mill, obtained ownership in 1892 and operated it until 1931.

== See also ==
- National Register of Historic Places listings in Box Elder County, Utah
