= Corinne Methodist Episcopal Church =

Historic church in Utah, United States

- U.S. National Register of Historic Places
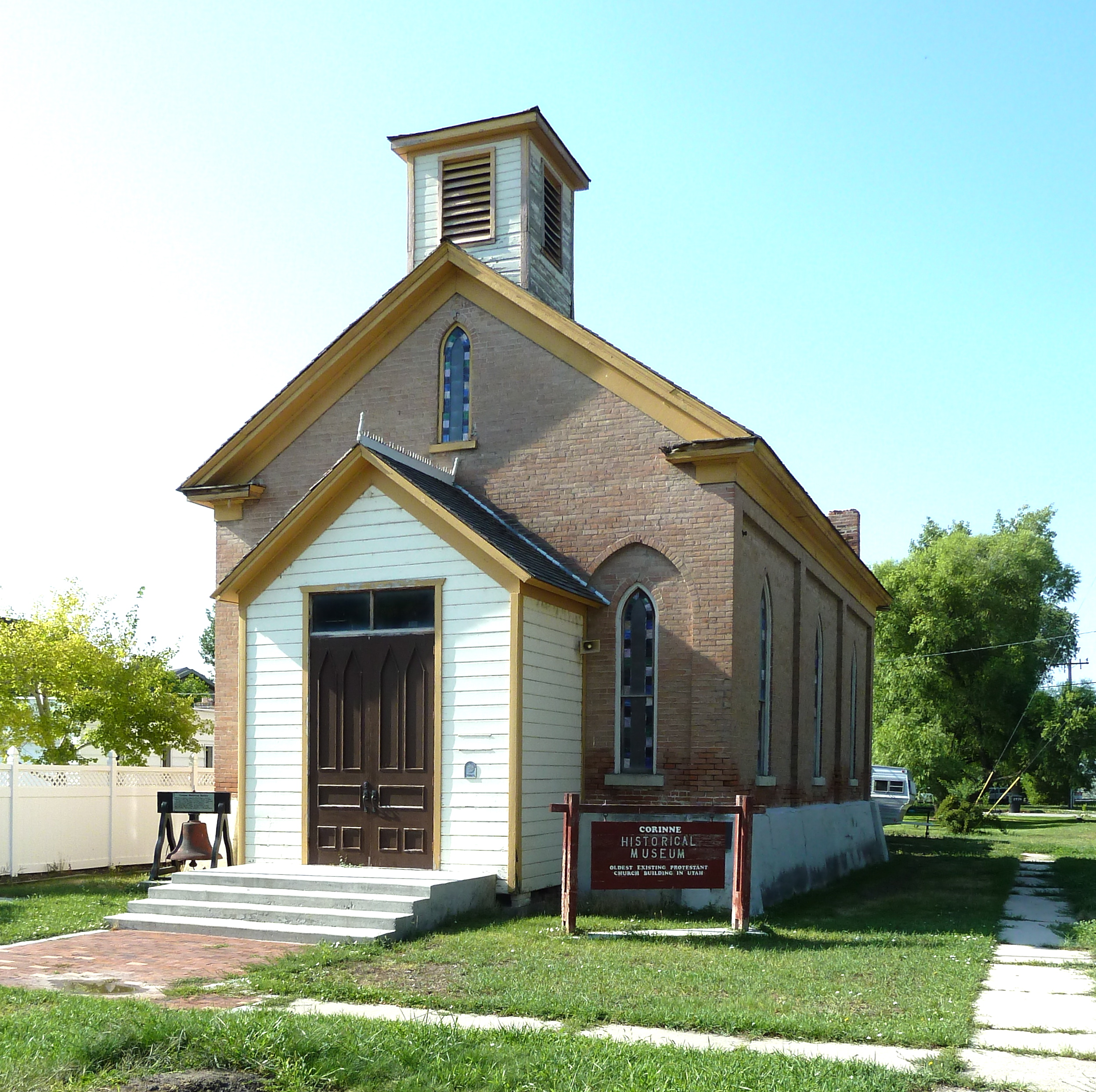

- Location within Utah Location within the United States
- Location: Corner of Colorado and S. 600 Sts., Corinne, Utah
- Coordinates: 41°32′51″N 112°6′40″W
- Area: 0.1 acres (0.040 ha)
- Built: 1870
- NRHP reference No.: 71000842
- Added to NRHP: May 14, 1971

Corinne Methodist Episcopal Church (Corinne Methodist Church) is a historic church at the corner of Colorado and S. 600 Streets in Corinne, Utah. It was one of the first churches in Corrinne, a town established by non-Mormons in the overwhelmingly Mormon Utah Territory. It was the first Protestant building in Utah as well as the first Methodist church in Utah. The church was completed in 1870, and was part of efforts by main-line Protestants to convert Mormons.

The one-story brick church measures about 27 feet (8.2 m) by 50 feet (15 m). The stone foundation is strongly battered, with short piers or pilasters at the corners. The interior is a single room, with a low platform opposite the entrance. The single door is set in a Gothic arch. Lancet windows flank the entrance, set in Gothic arched openings. A later wooden vestibule obscures the entry. A narrow lancet is set into the front gable. The shingle roof has a small wooden bell tower over the entry. Side elevations are three bays with lancets set into inset rectangular panels. The rear elevation is entirely blank.

The Corinne Methodist Episcopal Church was built in 1870 and added to the National Register of Historic Places in 1971.
