= Fryer Hotel =

- U.S. National Register of Historic Places
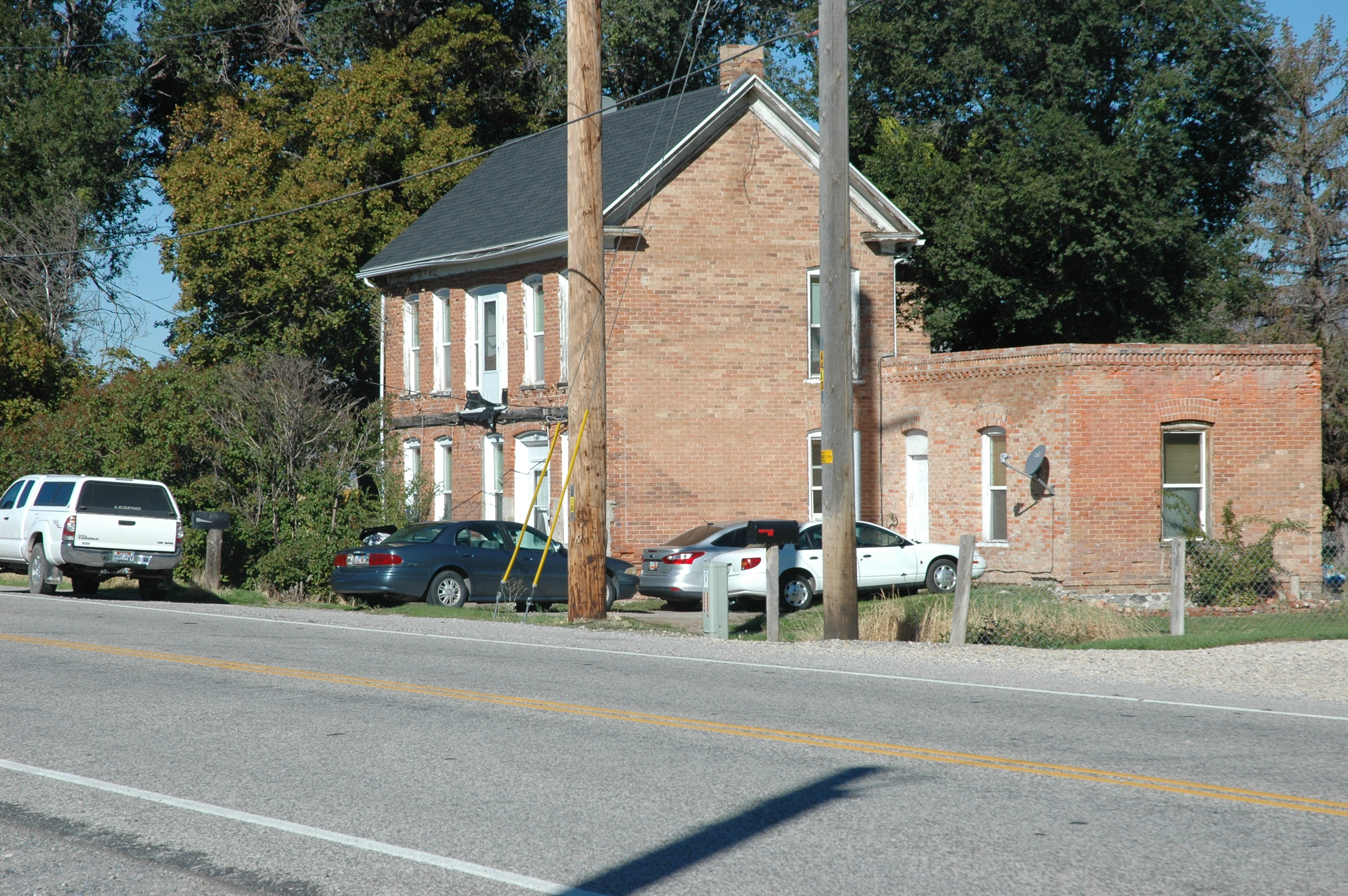
- The hotel in 2016

- Location within Utah Location within the United States
- Location: 3274 W. 11300 North, Deweyville, Utah
- Coordinates: 41°42′56″N 112°05′46″W
- Area: 1.1 acres (0.45 ha)
- Built: 1902
- Architectural style: Greek Revival, Late Victorian, Victorian Eclectic
- NRHP reference No.: 88000379
- Added to NRHP: April 7, 1988

The Fryer Hotel is a historic two-story hotel building in Deweyville, Utah. It was built in 1902-1903 by Robert C. Fryer, and designed in the Greek Revival and Victorian Eclectic styles. Fryer was an immigrant from England who married Bashua Dorcas Kingsbury, lived in Salt Lake City prior to moving to Deweyville, and eventually returned there in 1913. It has been listed on the National Register of Historic Places since April 7, 1988.
