= Howard Hotel (Utah) =

Historic hotel in Brigham City, Utah, United States

- U.S. National Register of Historic Places
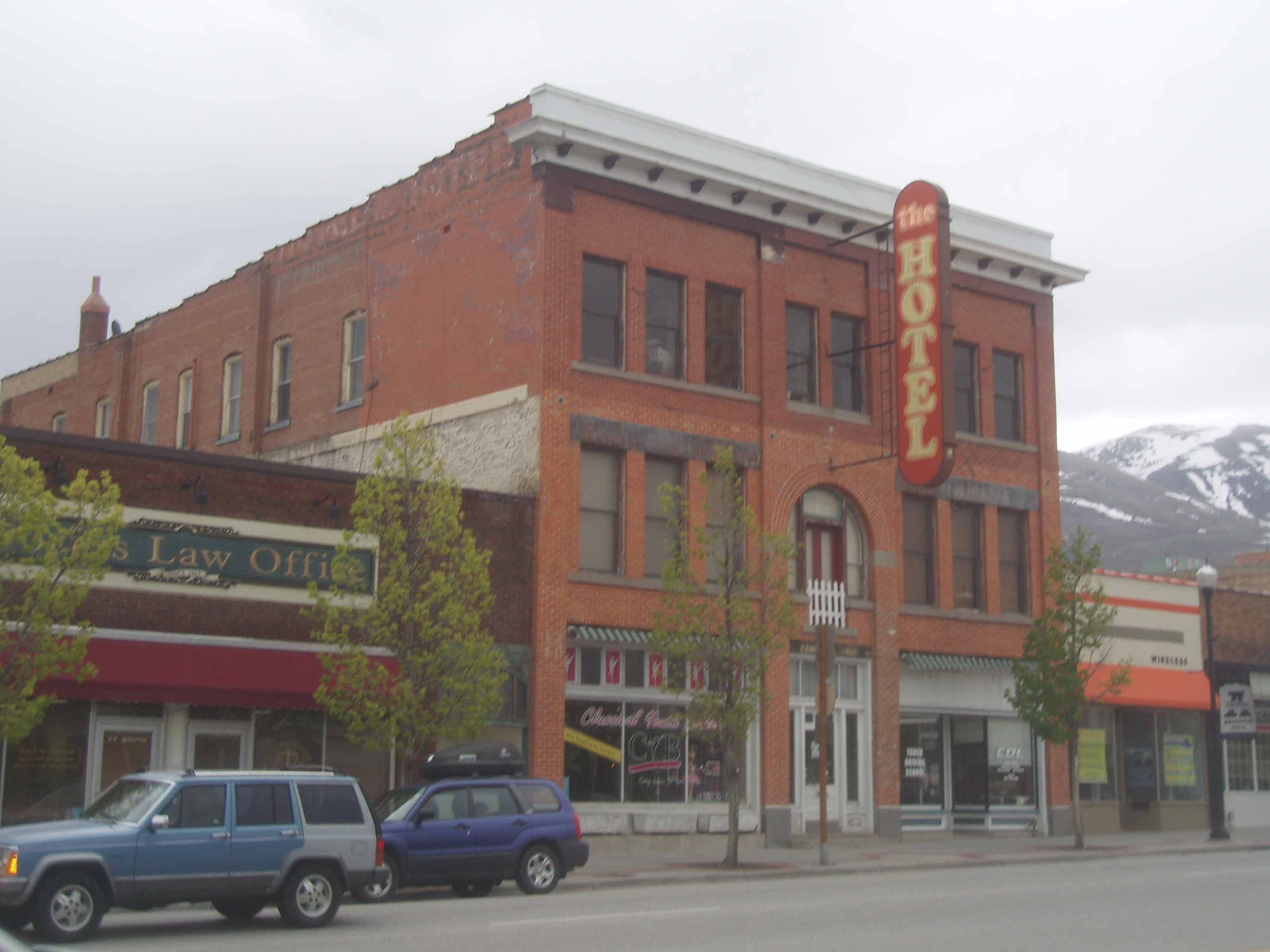
- Howard Hotel, April 2010

- Location within Utah Location within the United States
- Location: 35 South Main Street; Brigham City, Utah; United States
- Coordinates: 41°30′35″N 112°00′53″W
- Area: less than one acre
- Built: c. 1903; 1914; 1923; 1934
- Built by: Loreizo Peterson
- Architect: C.F. Wells
- Architectural style: Classical Revival
- MPS: Brigham City Private Commercial and Industrial Development MPS
- NRHP reference No.: 94001209
- Added to NRHP: October 7, 1994

The Howard Hotel is a historic hotel in Brigham City, Utah, United States, that is listed on the National Register of Historic Places (NRHP).

== Description ==
The former hotel is located at 35 South Main Street (Utah State Route 13). It was built as a two-story, brick and adobe hotel around 1903, and was expanded by addition of a third story in 1914. The hotel has a red brick front facade and third-story side walls, the lower side walls are adobe. It was further modified in 1923 and in 1934.

It was designed by C.F. Wells and built by contractor Lorenzo Peterson. It has also been known as the Utah-Na Hotel, as the Wasatch Hotel, and as the Boothe Hotel. It was in use as a Greyhound bus station in 1946.

The building was listed on the NRHP October 7, 1994.

== Gallery ==
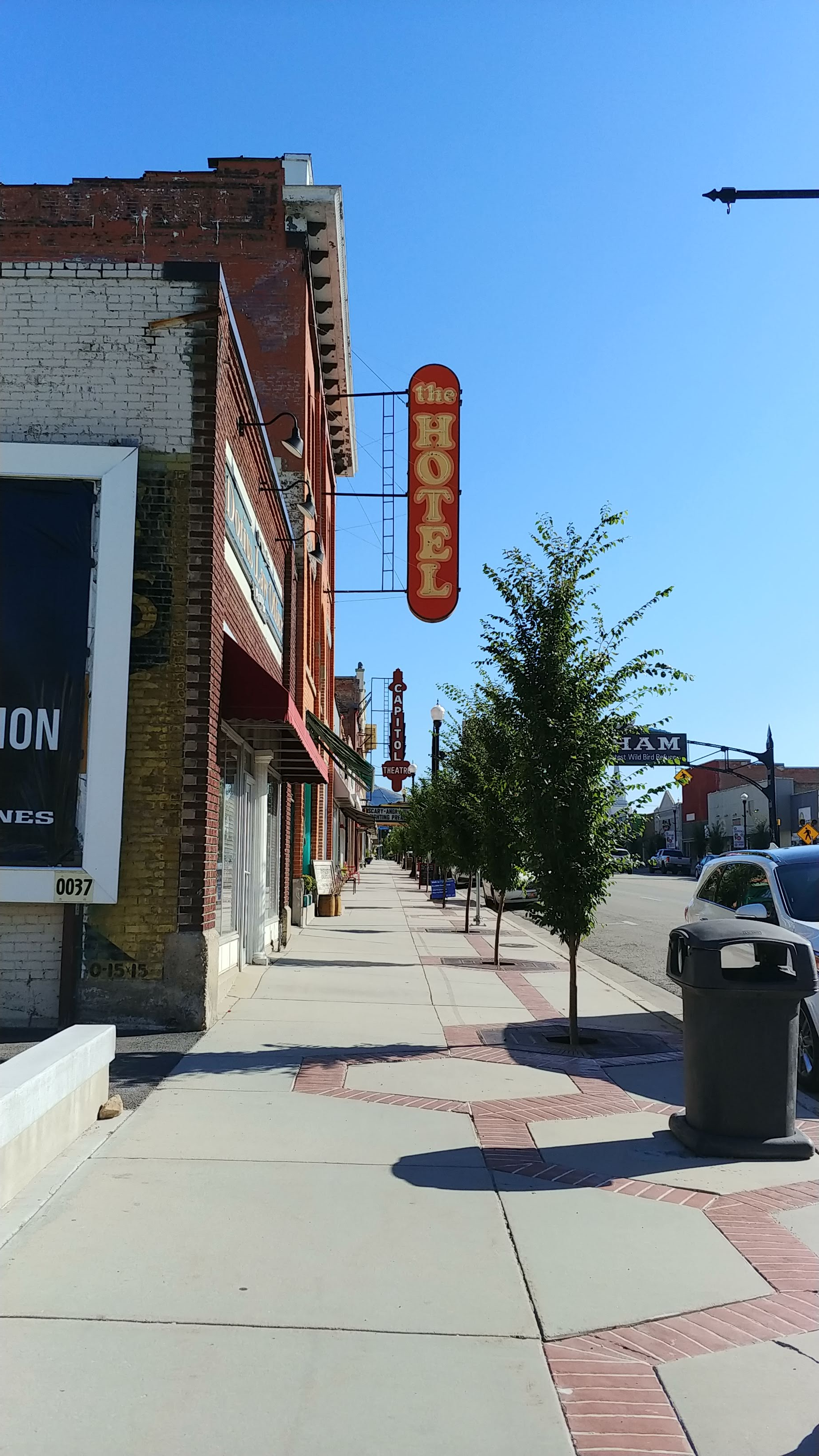
Hotel Howard - Brigham City

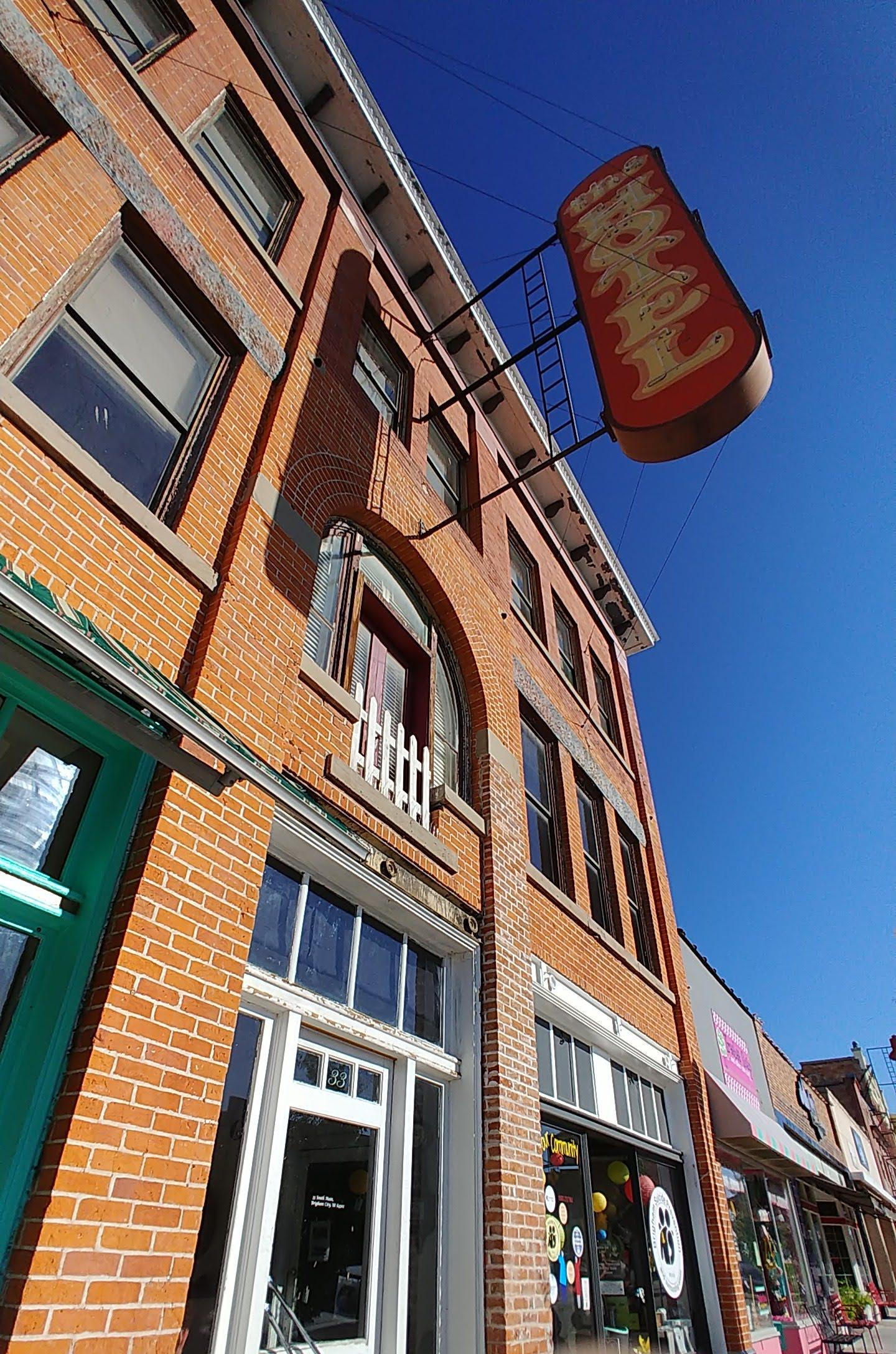
Hotel Howard - Brigham City

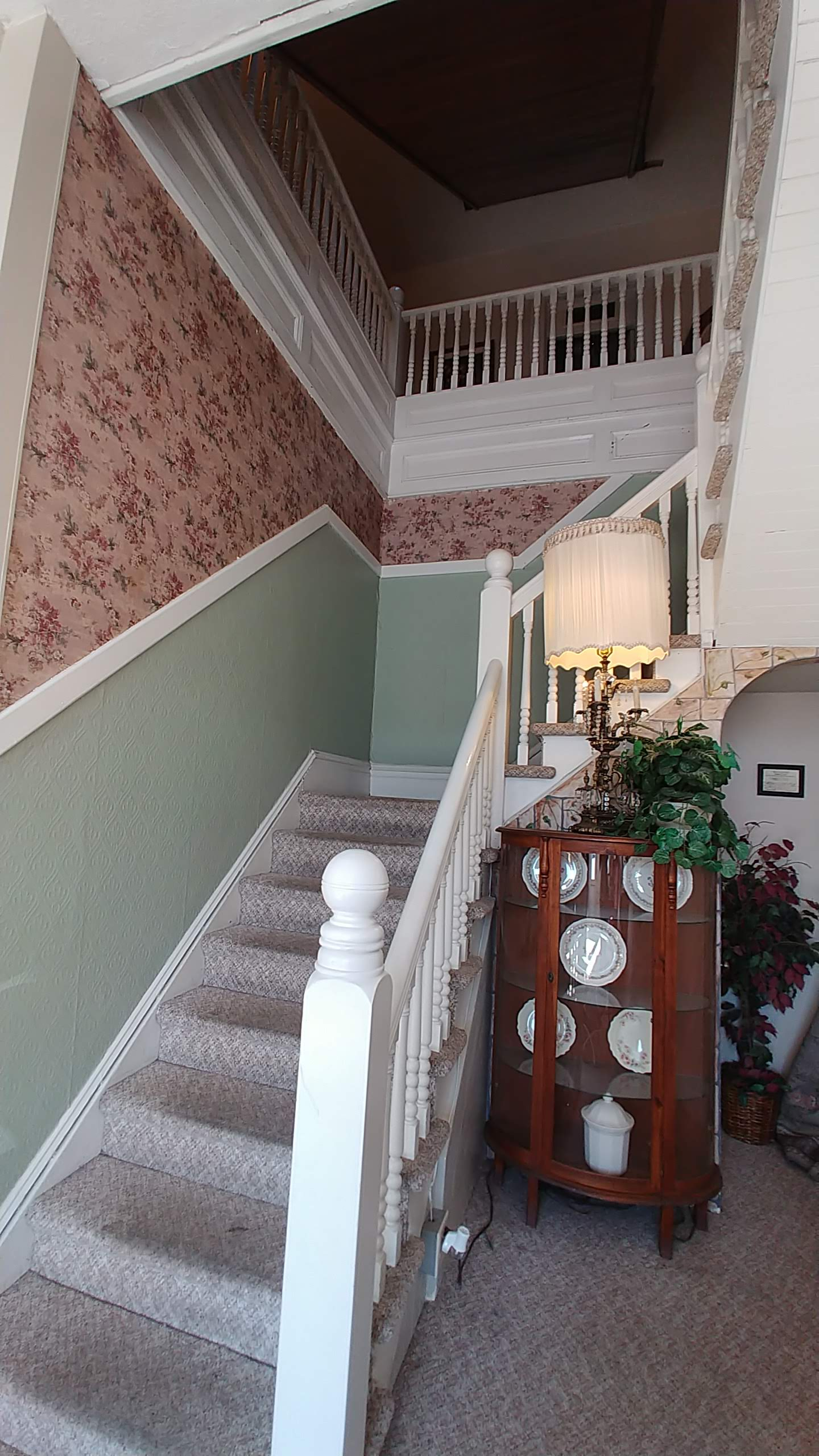
Looking up from the 1st-floor landing

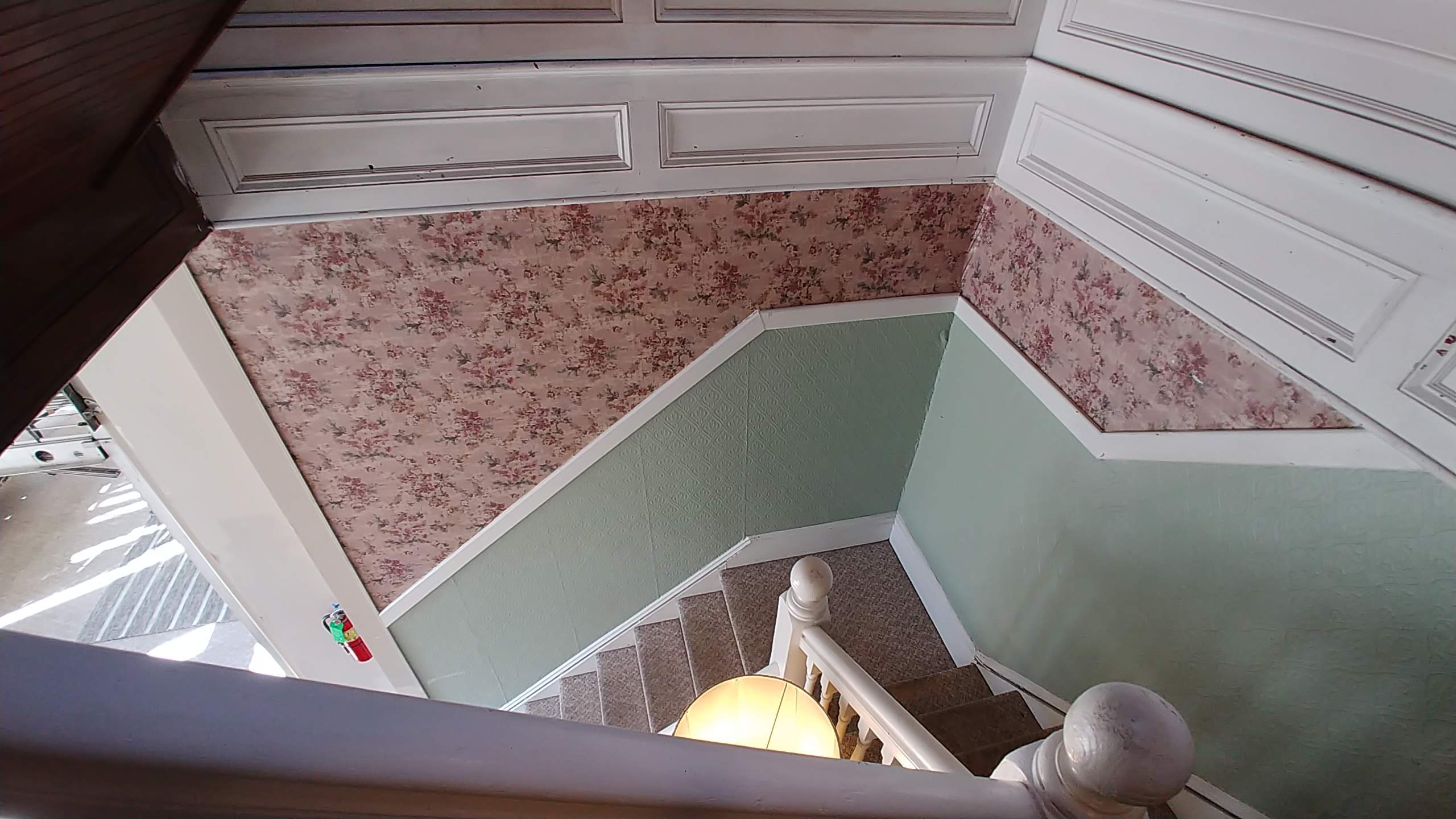
Looking down from the 2nd floor

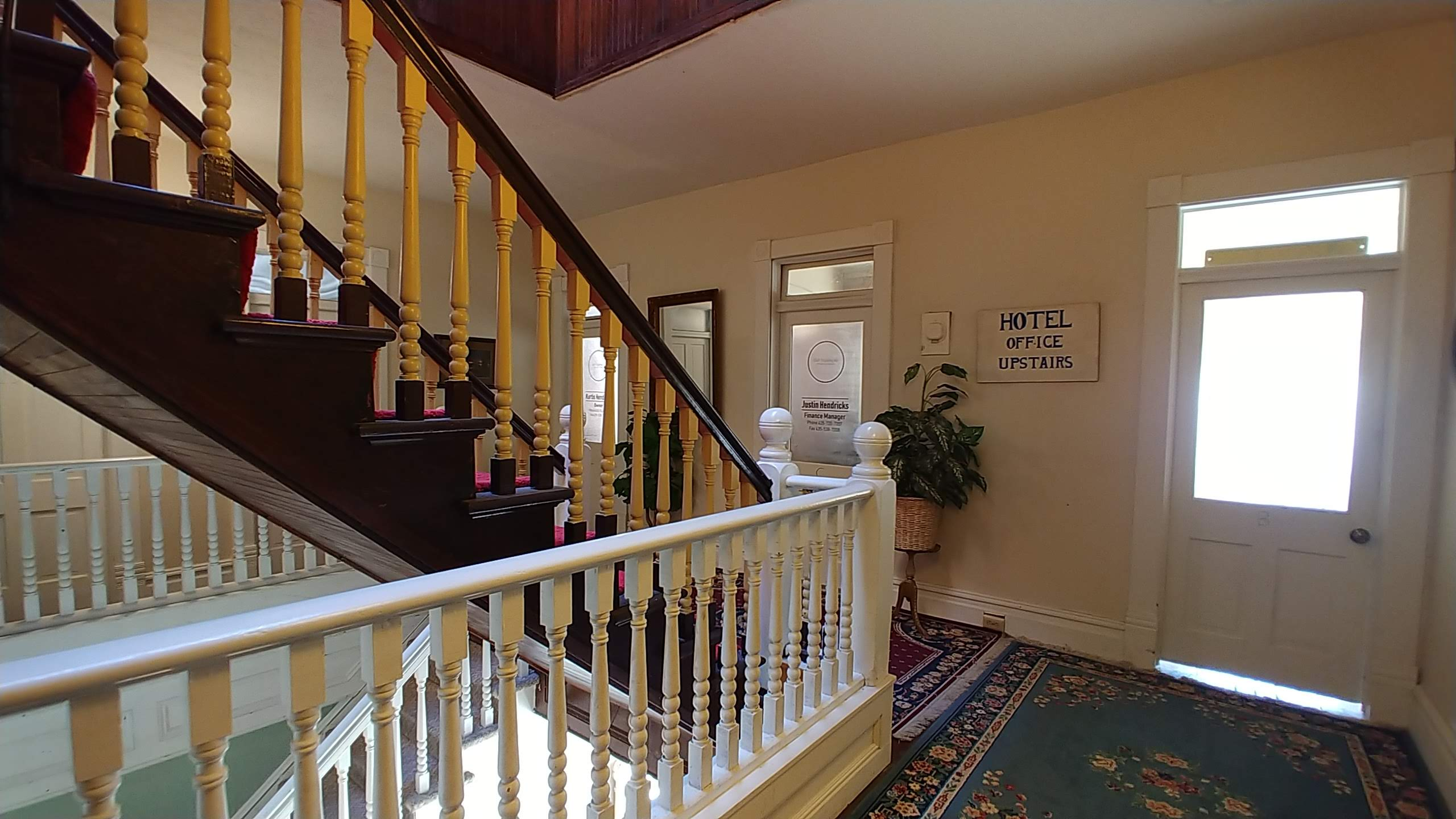
2nd-floor landing

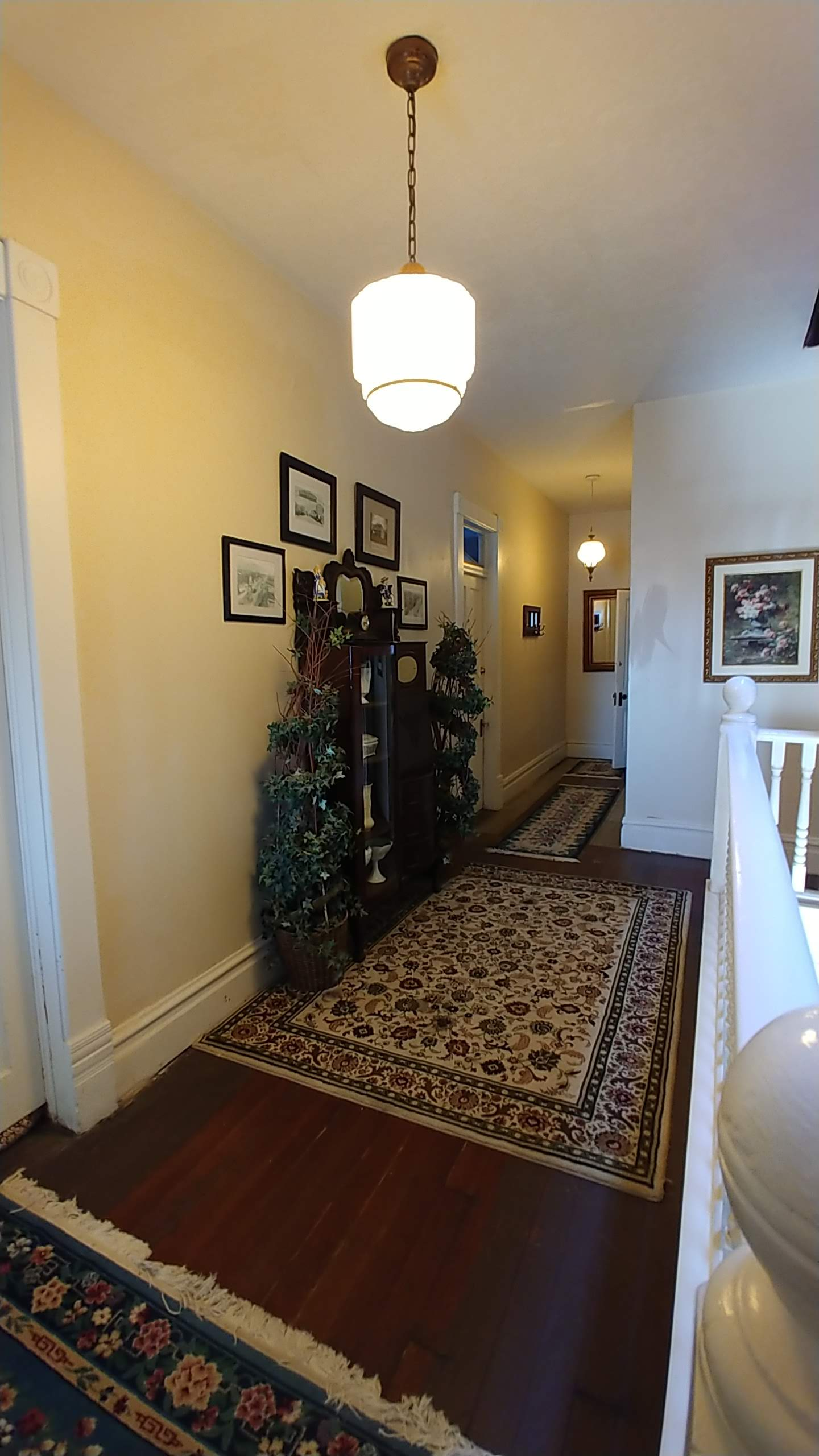
2nd-floor landing

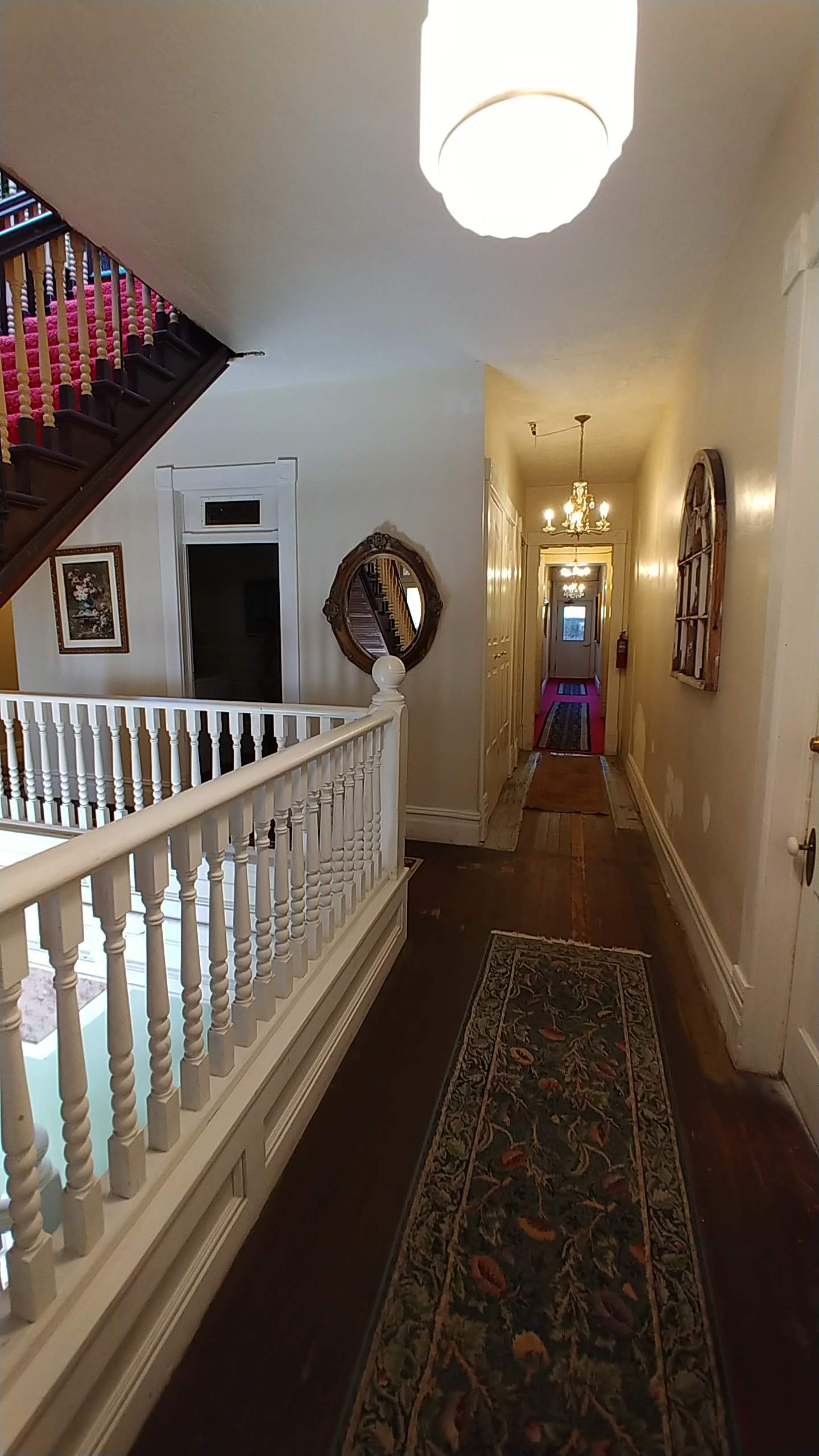
2nd floor landing

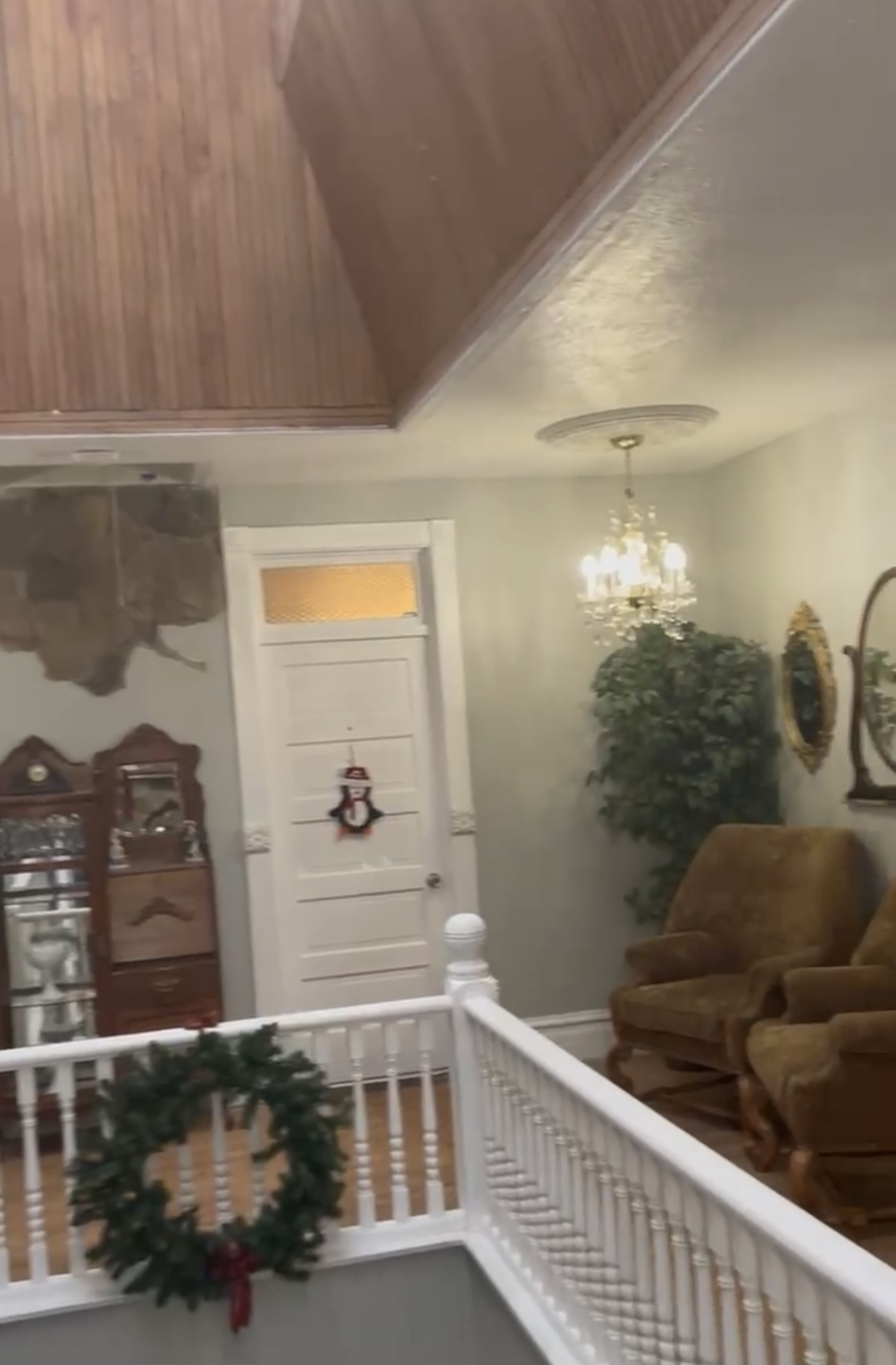
3rd floor

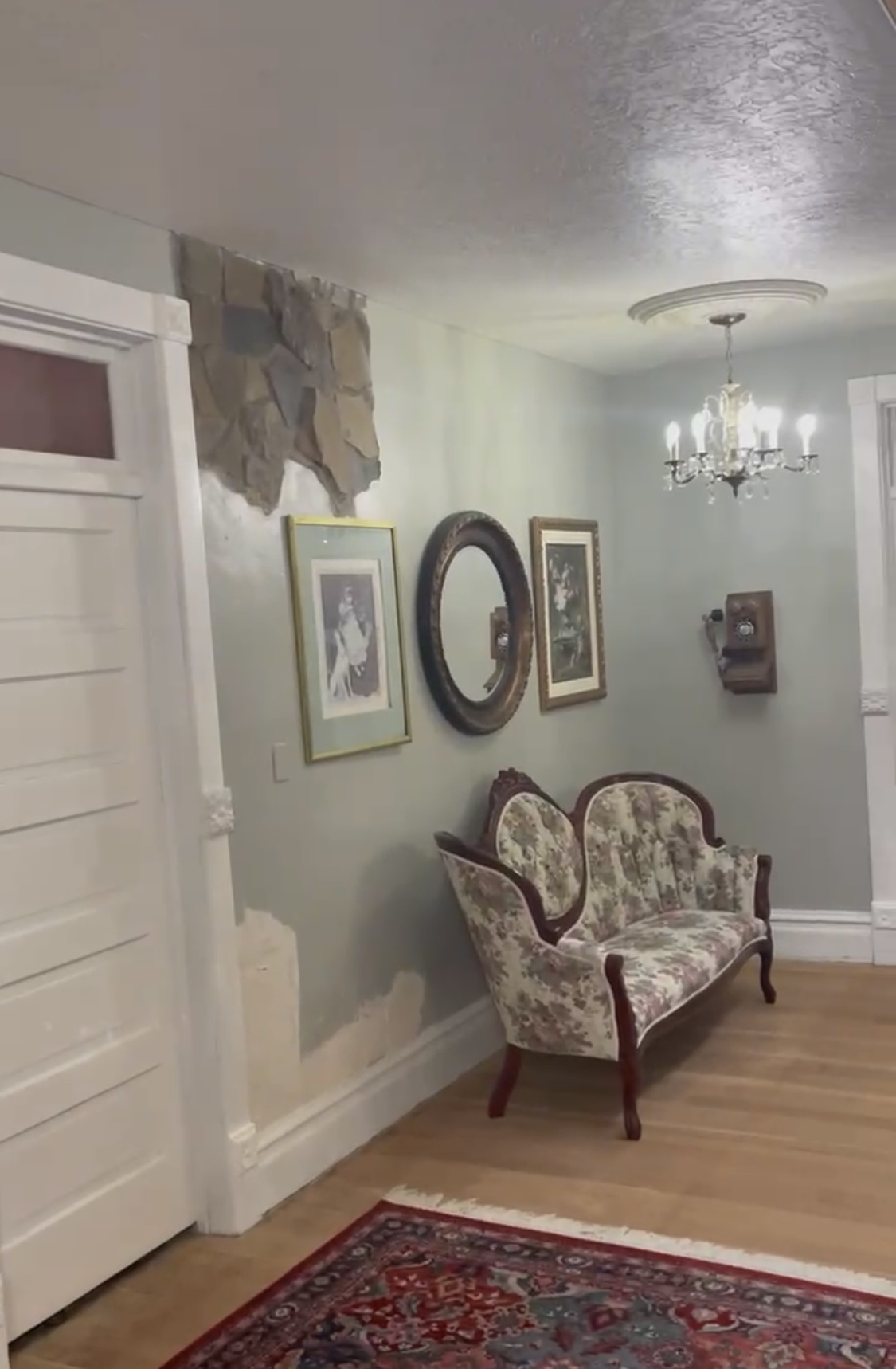
3rd floor

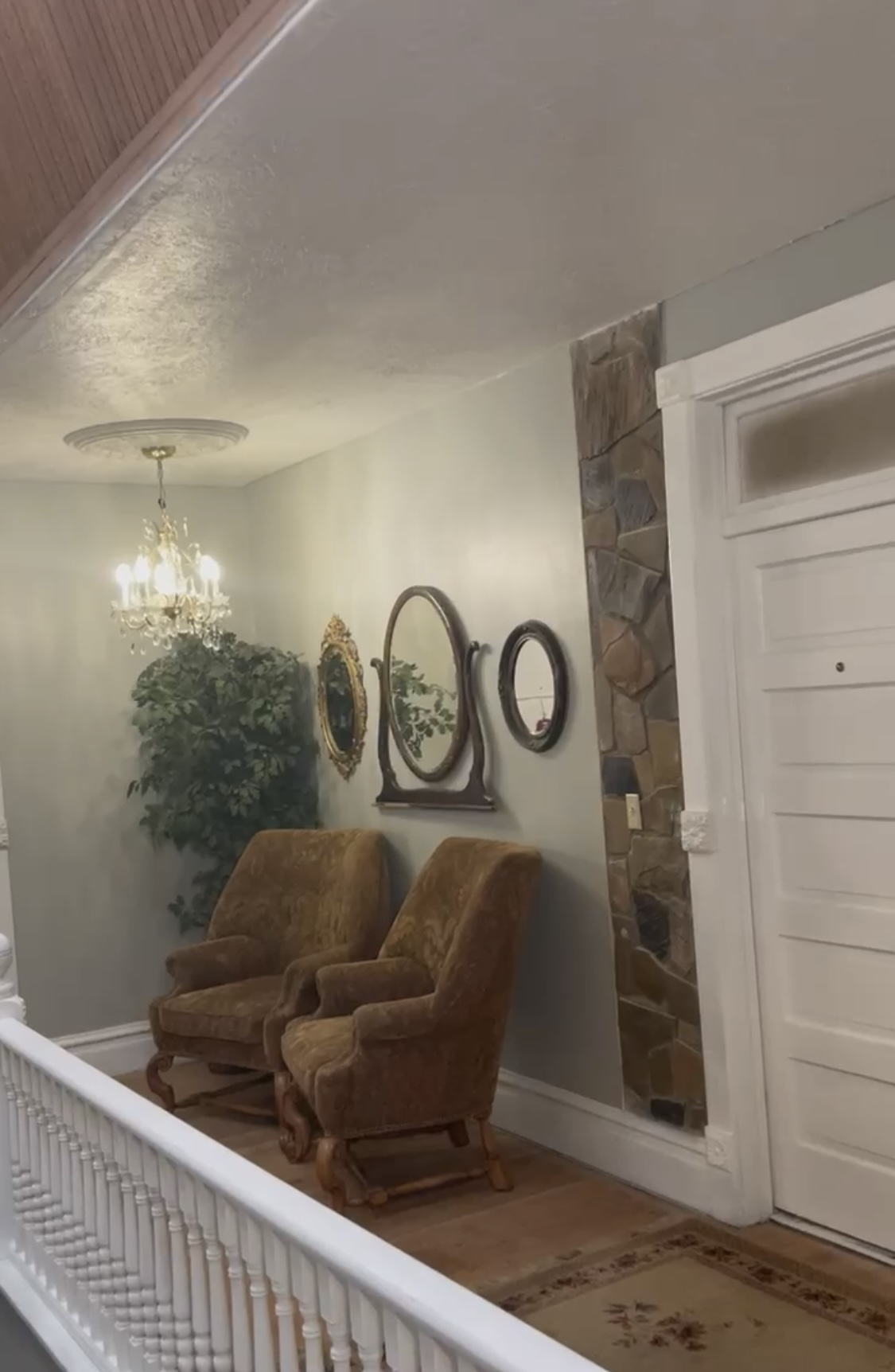
3rd floor

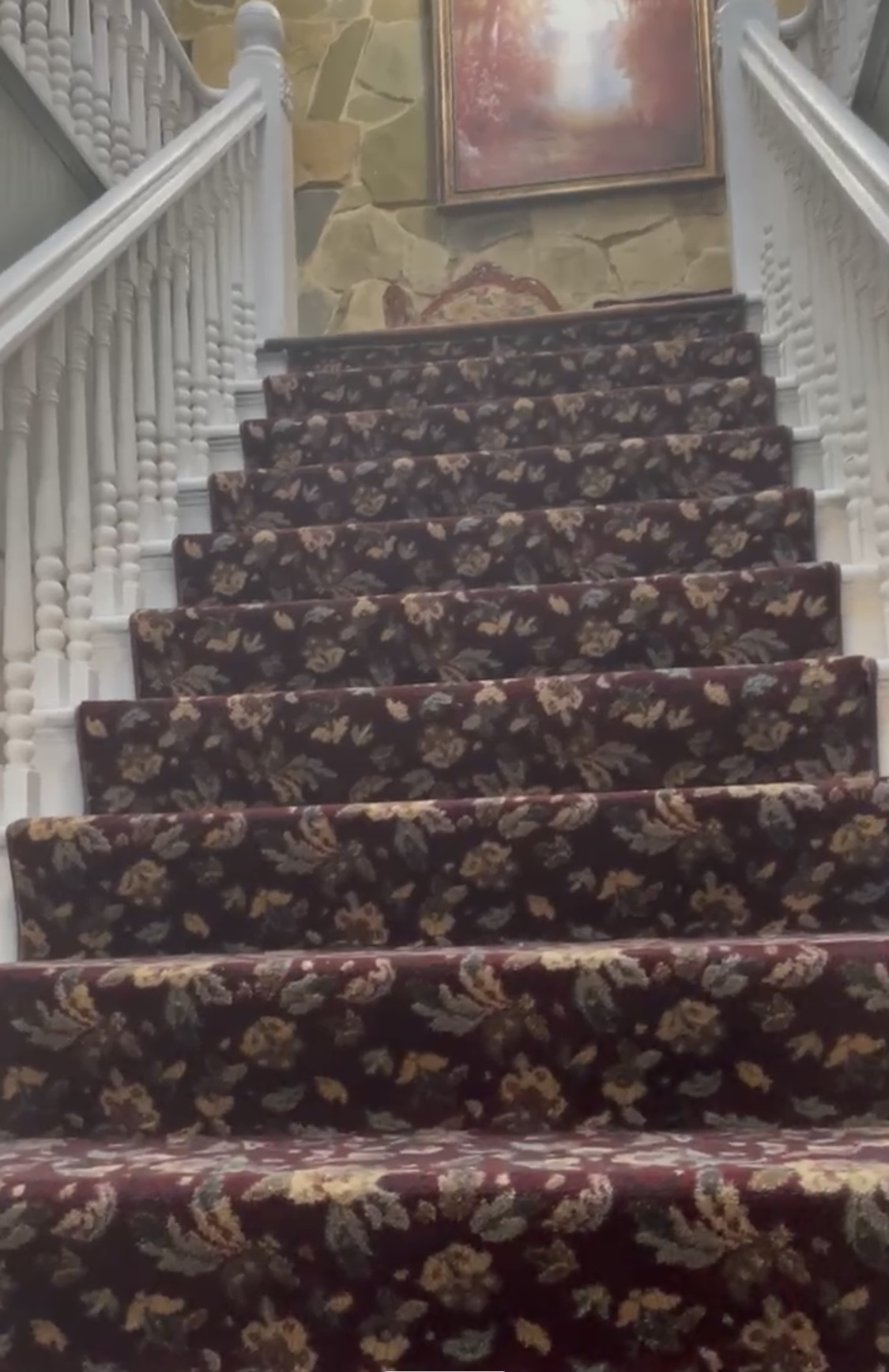
Staircase to 3rd floor

== See also ==
- National Register of Historic Places listings in Box Elder County, Utah
