= Garland Carnegie Library =

- U.S. National Register of Historic Places
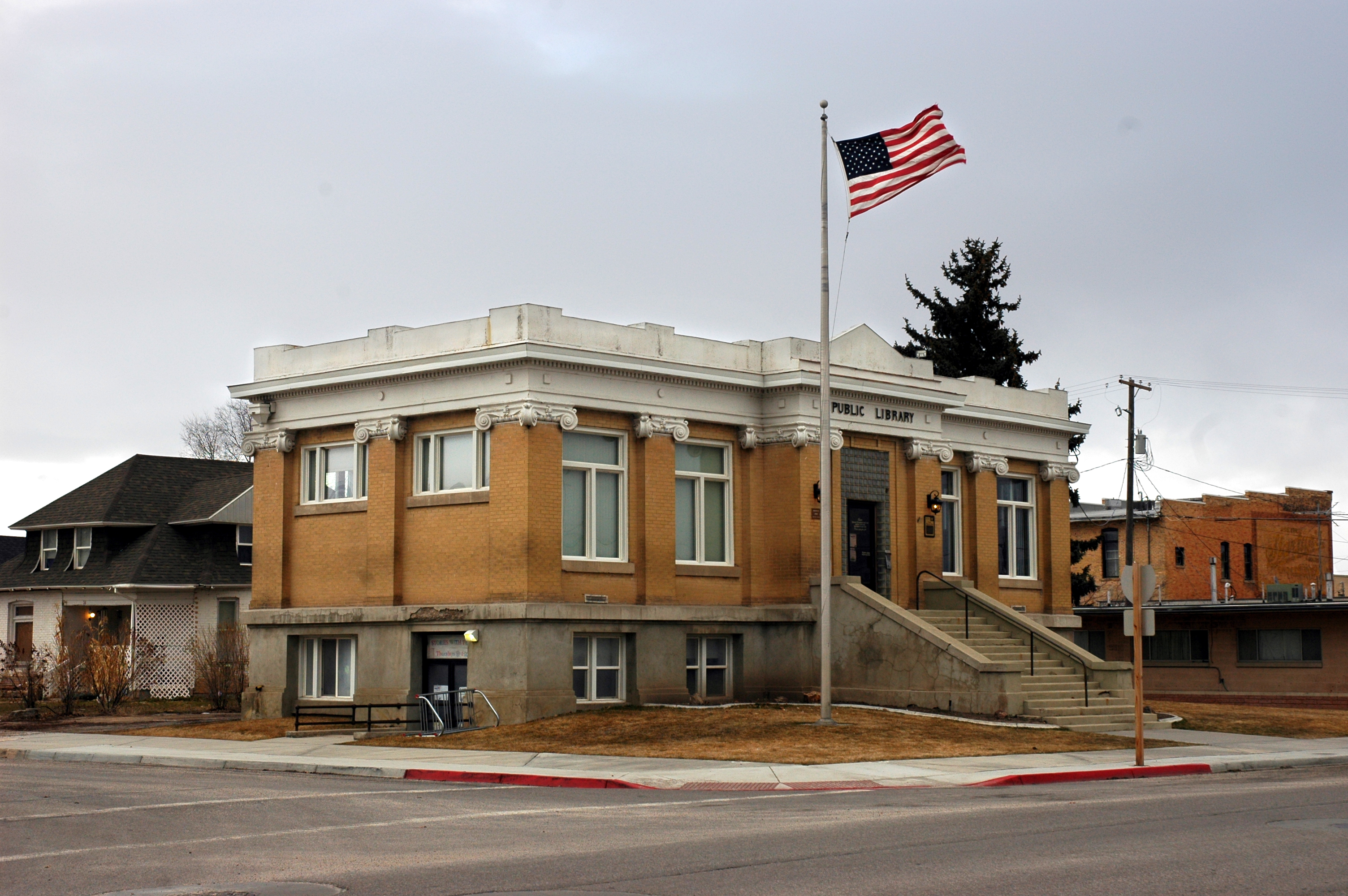

- Location within Utah
- Location: 86 W. Factory St., Garland, Utah
- Coordinates: 41°44′29″N 112°09′46″W
- Area: less than one acre
- Built: 1914
- Built by: Newton Company
- Architectural style: Classical Revival
- MPS: Carnegie Library TR
- NRHP reference No.: 84000146
- Added to NRHP: October 25, 1984

The Garland Carnegie Library, at 86 W. Factory St. in Garland, Utah, is a Carnegie library which was built in 1914. It was listed on the National Register of Historic Places in 1914.

Like many Carnegie libraries, it is a one-story structure built on a raised basement. It was built by the Newton Company in Classical Revival style.
