= Washakie LDS Ward Chapel =

- U.S. National Register of Historic Places
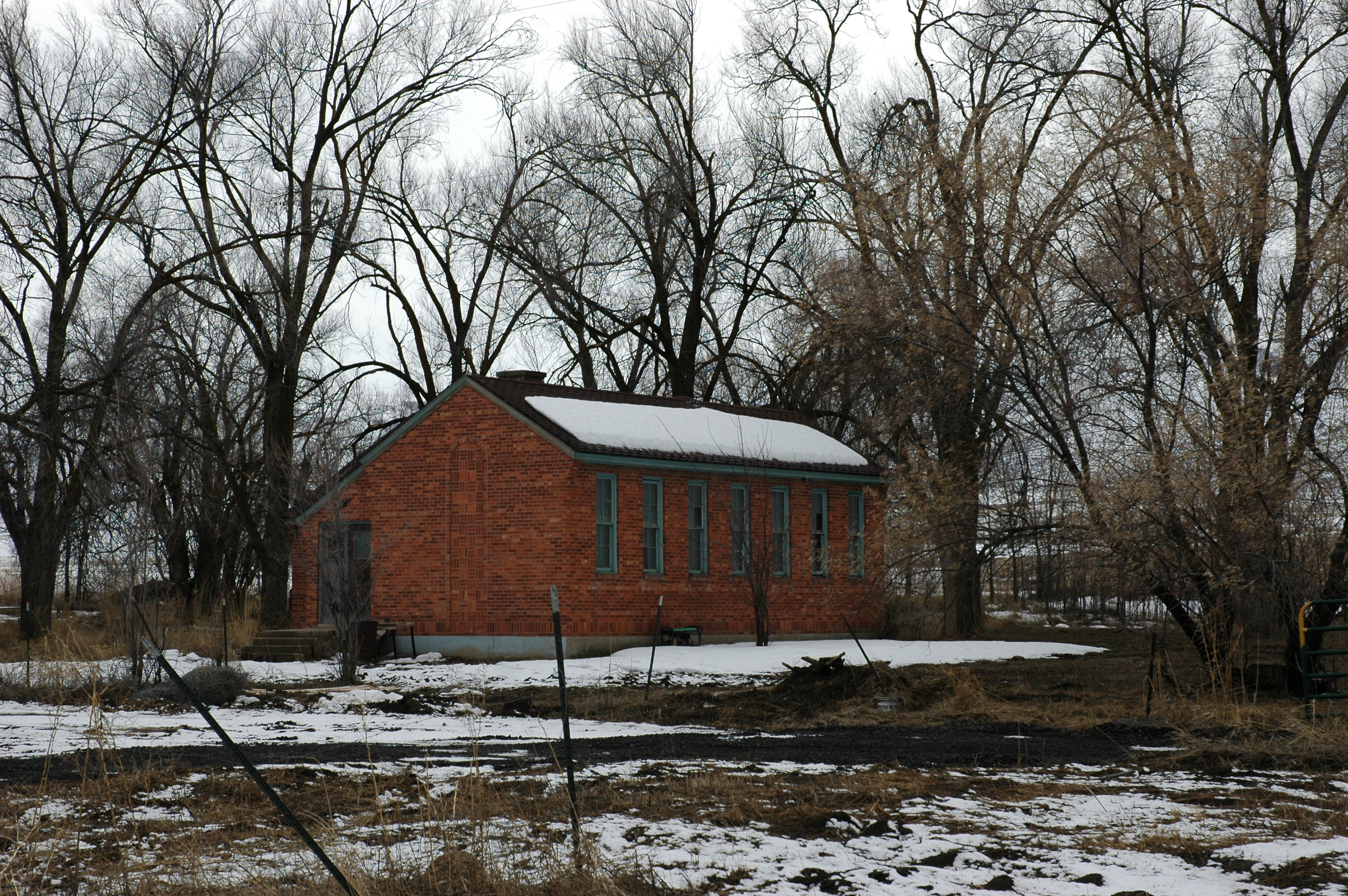
- The chapel in 2010

- Location within Utah Location within the United States
- Location: Along Samaria Lake Canal, Washakie, Utah
- Coordinates: 41°56′38″N 112°13′04″W
- Area: 1 acre (0.40 ha)
- Built: 1939
- Architect: Edward O. Anderson
- Architectural style: Colonial Revival
- NRHP reference No.: 98000641
- Added to NRHP: June 3, 1998

The Washakie LDS Ward Chapel is a historic one-story building in Washakie, Utah. It was built in 1939 for the Church of Jesus Christ of Latter-day Saints, and designed in the Colonial Revival style by architect Edward O. Anderson. It has been listed on the National Register of Historic Places since June 3, 1998.
