= Brigham City Carnegie Library =

- U.S. National Register of Historic Places
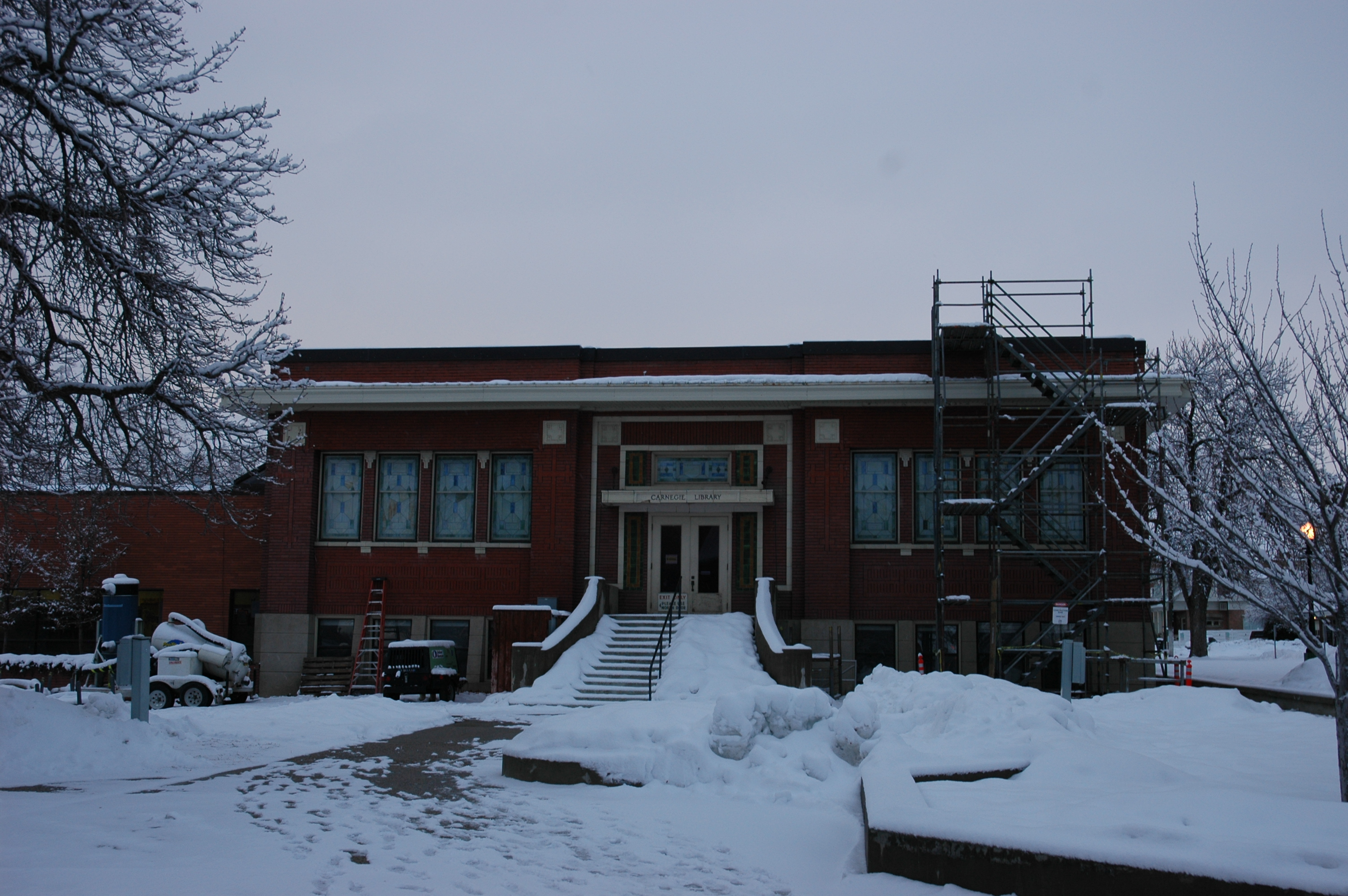

- Location within Utah Location within the United States
- Location: 26 E. Forest St., Brigham City, Utah
- Coordinates: 41°30′39″N 112°0′51″W
- Area: less than one acre
- Built: 1915
- Architect: Shreeve & Madsen
- Architectural style: Prairie School
- MPS: Carnegie Library TR
- NRHP reference No.: 84000143
- Added to NRHP: October 25, 1984

The Brigham City Carnegie Library, at 26 E. Forest St. in Brigham City in Box Elder County, Utah, dates from 1915. It was listed on the National Register of Historic Places in 1984.

It is a two-story Prairie School-style building, one of 23 Carnegie libraries built in Utah, only three designed in Prairie style. In 1983 it was one of 17 surviving Carnegie libraries and was deemed "one of the best of less than twenty well preserved examples of public buildings designed in [Prairie School] style in Utah."
