= Bear River High School Science Building =

- U.S. National Register of Historic Places
- Location within Utah Location within the United States
- Location: 1450 S. Main St., Garland, Utah
- Coordinates: 41°43′33″N 112°09′43″W
- Area: less than one acre
- Built: 1935
- Architectural style: PWA Moderne
- MPS: Public Works Buildings TR
- NRHP reference No.: 85000797
- Added to NRHP: April 1, 1985

The Bear River High School Science Building, at 1450 S. Main St. in Garland, Utah, was built as a Works Progress Administration public works project in 1935. It was listed on the National Register of Historic Places in 1985.

It is a two-story red brick building, PWA Moderne in style.

It was one of 233 buildings built in Utah as part of similar programs.
