= Union Block (Brigham City, Utah) =

- U.S. National Register of Historic Places
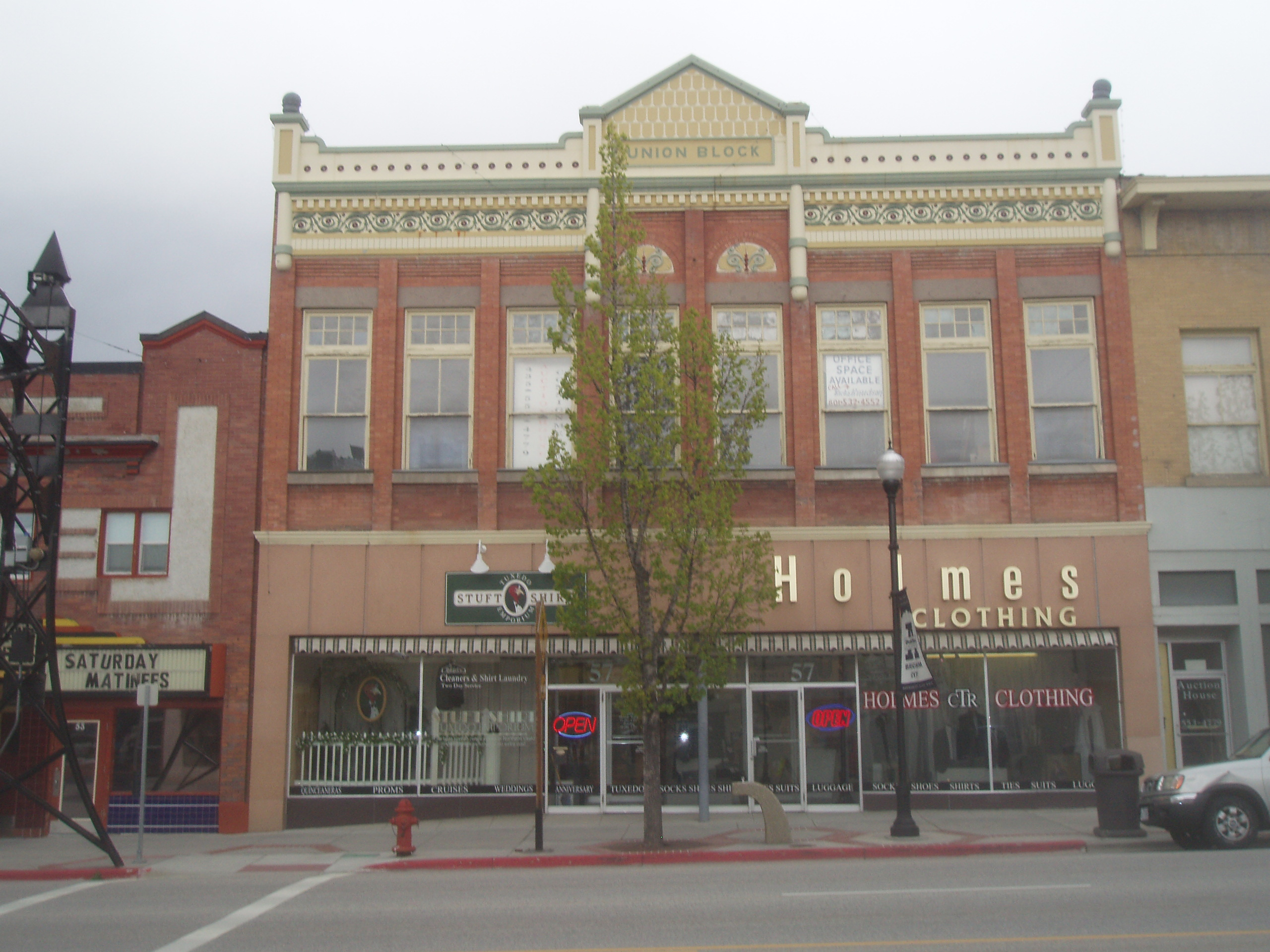

- Location within Utah
- Location: 57 S. Main St., Brigham City, Utah
- Coordinates: 41°30′32″N 112°00′52″W
- Area: 0.2 acres (0.081 ha)
- Built: 1892
- Built by: Royes J. Petersen (1929 addition)
- Architectural style: Two-part commercial block
- MPS: Brigham City MPS
- NRHP reference No.: 91001545
- Added to NRHP: October 17, 1991

The Union Block, a building at 57 S. Main St. in Brigham City, Utah, was built in 1892. It was listed on the National Register of Historic Places in 1991.

It is a two-part commercial block building. It has also been known as the C.W. Knudson Building.

It was expanded to the rear in 1929 by 65 feet (20 m) to accommodate a J.C. Penney store as a tenant, in work done by builder Royes J. Petersen.
