= Grouse Creek, Utah =

Unincorporated community in the state of Utah, United States

- Unincorporated community
- Location within the state of Utah
- Coordinates: 41°42′34″N 113°53′0″W
- Country: United States
- State: Utah
- County: Box Elder
- Settled: 1876
- Founded by: Benjamin F. Cook
- Named after: Sage Grouse
- Elevation: 5,331 ft (1,625 m)
- Time zone: UTC-7 (Mountain (MST))
  - Summer (DST): UTC-6 (MDT)
- ZIP codes: 84313
- GNIS feature ID: 1428419

Grouse Creek (also Cookesville) is an unincorporated community in the nearly unpopulated northwestern region of Box Elder County, Utah, United States, near the Idaho and Nevada borders. The community lies along unpaved roads north of State Route 30 in the Grouse Creek Mountains. Its elevation is 5,331 feet (1,625 m). It has a post office with the ZIP code 84313.

== History ==
Grouse Creek was first settled in 1876. The community took its name from a nearby creek of the same name where grouse were abundant.

== Climate ==
According to the Köppen Climate Classification system, Grouse Creek has a semi-arid climate, abbreviated "BSk" on climate maps.

Climate data for Grouse Creek, Utah, 1991–2020 normals, 1959-2020 extremes: 5320ft (1622m)
| Month | Jan | Feb | Mar | Apr | May | Jun | Jul | Aug | Sep | Oct | Nov | Dec | Year |
|---|---|---|---|---|---|---|---|---|---|---|---|---|---|
| Record high °F (°C) | 58 (14) | 65 (18) | 75 (24) | 84 (29) | 93 (34) | 100 (38) | 104 (40) | 101 (38) | 97 (36) | 87 (31) | 74 (23) | 63 (17) | 104 (40) |
| Mean maximum °F (°C) | 47.4 (8.6) | 52.3 (11.3) | 64.6 (18.1) | 74.9 (23.8) | 82.5 (28.1) | 90.6 (32.6) | 97.2 (36.2) | 95.8 (35.4) | 89.4 (31.9) | 79.4 (26.3) | 61.2 (16.2) | 50.6 (10.3) | 97.8 (36.6) |
| Mean daily maximum °F (°C) | 35.0 (1.7) | 39.5 (4.2) | 49.1 (9.5) | 56.5 (13.6) | 66.4 (19.1) | 77.3 (25.2) | 88.2 (31.2) | 87.3 (30.7) | 77.2 (25.1) | 62.4 (16.9) | 46.5 (8.1) | 35.2 (1.8) | 60.1 (15.6) |
| Daily mean °F (°C) | 24.0 (−4.4) | 27.7 (−2.4) | 36.3 (2.4) | 42.8 (6.0) | 51.4 (10.8) | 60.5 (15.8) | 69.6 (20.9) | 68.2 (20.1) | 58.9 (14.9) | 45.9 (7.7) | 33.3 (0.7) | 24.3 (−4.3) | 45.2 (7.4) |
| Mean daily minimum °F (°C) | 12.9 (−10.6) | 16.0 (−8.9) | 23.6 (−4.7) | 29.0 (−1.7) | 36.5 (2.5) | 43.6 (6.4) | 51.0 (10.6) | 49.1 (9.5) | 40.6 (4.8) | 29.3 (−1.5) | 20.2 (−6.6) | 13.3 (−10.4) | 30.4 (−0.9) |
| Mean minimum °F (°C) | −4.1 (−20.1) | 0.3 (−17.6) | 9.4 (−12.6) | 16.7 (−8.5) | 23.2 (−4.9) | 30.4 (−0.9) | 39.7 (4.3) | 37.4 (3.0) | 26.6 (−3.0) | 15.5 (−9.2) | 2.9 (−16.2) | −3.8 (−19.9) | −8.4 (−22.4) |
| Record low °F (°C) | −26 (−32) | −18 (−28) | −6 (−21) | 4 (−16) | 15 (−9) | 24 (−4) | 30 (−1) | 25 (−4) | 16 (−9) | 0 (−18) | −12 (−24) | −25 (−32) | −26 (−32) |
| Average precipitation inches (mm) | 0.87 (22) | 0.67 (17) | 1.00 (25) | 1.15 (29) | 1.50 (38) | 1.03 (26) | 0.49 (12) | 0.92 (23) | 0.89 (23) | 0.72 (18) | 0.79 (20) | 1.03 (26) | 11.06 (279) |
| Average snowfall inches (cm) | 11.80 (30.0) | 7.40 (18.8) | 3.80 (9.7) | 1.20 (3.0) | 0.00 (0.00) | 0.00 (0.00) | 0.00 (0.00) | 0.00 (0.00) | 0.00 (0.00) | 0.20 (0.51) | 6.90 (17.5) | 11.10 (28.2) | 42.4 (107.71) |
Source 1: NOAA (1981-2010 snowfall)
Source 2: XMACIS2 (records & monthly max/mins)

== Demographics ==
Historical population
| Census | Pop. | Note | %± |
|---|---|---|---|
| 1880 | 267 | | — |
| 1890 | 274 | | 2.6% |
| 1900 | 278 | | 1.5% |
| 1910 | 337 | | 21.2% |
| 1920 | 342 | | 1.5% |
| 1930 | 329 | | −3.8% |
| 1940 | 267 | | −18.8% |
| 1950 | 167 | | −37.5% |
Source: U.S. Census Bureau
