= Interstate 84 Business (Tremonton, Utah) =

Interstate highway business loop in Box Elder County, Utah, United States

Interstate 84 Business

Route information
- Business route of I-84
- Maintained by UDOT
- Length: 5.7354 mi (9.2302 km)

Major junctions
- West end: I-84 / SR-102 in Tremonton
- I-15 BL in Tremonton; SR-82 in Tremonton; SR-13 / SR-102 in Tremonton
- East end: I-15 / I-84 / I-15 BL / SR-13 in Elwood

Location
- Country: United States
- State: Utah
- Counties: Box Elder

Highway system
- Interstate Highway System; Main; Auxiliary; Suffixed; Business; Future; Utah State Highway System; Interstate; US; State; Minor; Scenic

Interstate 84 Business Loop (I-84 BL) is a 5.7354-mile (9.2302 km) northern business loop off of I-84 in Box Elder County, Utah, that passes through Tremonton and Elwood. It is partially concurrent with I-15 BL and is the first business route along I-84 in the state.

== Route description ==
I-84 BL begins along Utah State Route 102 (SR-102) at a diamond interchange on I-84 (exit 40) in Tremonton. (I-84 heads west toward Snowville in Utah and then on to Twin Falls and Boise in Idaho. I-84 heads east to merge with I-15 and then continues on to Elwood.) From its western terminus, I-84 BL proceeds east along West Main Street, concurrent with SR-102, to pass under I-15 and then along the south edge of the Box Elder County Fairgrounds before reaching its junction with I-15 BL at 1000 West (Iowa String Road) on southeast corner of the fairgrounds. (I-15 BL heads north along North 100 West toward the Bear River Valley Hospital and I-15. Iowa String Road [South 1000 West] heads south toward Utah State Route 83 and Corinne.)

Continuing easta along West Main Street, I-84 BL runs concurrently with I-15 BL and SR-102 until it reaches Tremonton Street. At that intersection, the three routes transition from West Main Street to East Main Street. Next the three routes reach their junction with the southern end of Utah State Route 82 (North 300 East) at a T-intersection. (SR-82 heads north along North 300 East toward Garland.) Continuing east the three routes reach Haws Corner Junction (also known as Crossroads) at 1600 East and I-15 BL and I-84 BL turn south (right) to run along Utah State Route 13 (SR-13/South 1600 East) as they leave their concurrency with SR-102. (SR-13 heads north along North 5200 West toward Riverside and Plymouth and SR-102 continues east along West 11200 North toward Deweyville and Logan.)

Proceeding south the three routes (I-15 BL, I-84 BL, and SR-13) leave Tremonton (at about 400 South) and then enter Elwood about 3,500 feet (1,100 m) later (at West 10400 North) and then reach the southern terminus of I-15 BL and the eastern terminus of I-84 BL at I-15/I-84 (exit 378) at another diamond interchange. (I-15 / I-84 heads north and west toward Tremonton, Riverside, and Snowville in Utah and then on to Malad City, Pocatello, and Twin Falls in Idaho. I-15 / I-84 heads south and east toward Honeyville, Brigham City, Ogden, and Salt Lake City. SR-13 continues south along North 5200 West toward Corrine.)

While fairly adequate signage previously existed along both I-15 BL and I-84 BL, by 2024, it was extremely limited. (Note: As of 2024 there were no shields remaining for eastbound I-84 BL (not along the route, nor any of the exit advance guide signs or the interchange exit direction sign). The only shields remaining for westbound I-84 BL are one on the exit 1 mile advance guide sign (but not the exit 1/2 mile advance guide sign, nor the interchange exit direction sign) and one directional shield on the I-15/I-84 off ramp (exit 378). Both of those also included a shield for Interstate 15 Business.)

== Major intersections ==
The entire route is in Box Elder County.

Location	mi	km	Destinations	Notes
	0.000	0.000	SR-102 west (W 11200 North) – Golden Spike National Historical Park	Continuation west from western terminus
Tremonton	0.0000– 0.2056	0.0000– 0.3309	I-84 west (Vietnam Veterans Memorial Hwy) – Snowville, Twin Falls, Boise I-84 east (Vietnam Veterans Memorial Hwy) – Elwood, Honeyville, Brigham City, Ogden, Salt Lake City	Western terminus; diamond interchange; exit 40; western end of SR-102 concurrency
Tremonton	1.3802	2.2212	I-15 BL north (N 1000 West [Iowa String Rd]) – Bear River Valley Hospital, I-15; S 1000 West (Iowa String Rd) – Corinne	Northern end of I-84 BL/SR-102 concurrency
Tremonton	2.3775	3.8262	SR-82 north (N 300 East) – Garland	T intersection
Tremonton	3.3834	5.4451	SR-13 north (N 1600 East) – Plymouth, Pocatello SR-102 east (E Main St) – Deweyville, Logan	Haws Corner Junction (also known as Crossroads); western end of SR-13 concurrency; eastern end of SR-102 concurrency
Elwood	5.4918– 5.7354	8.8382– 9.2302	I-15 north (Veterans Memorial Hwy) / I-84 west (Vietnam Veterans Memorial Hwy) – Tremonton, Riverside, Snowville, Malad City, Pocatello, Twin Falls I-15 south (Veterans Memorial Hwy) / I-84 east (Vietnam Veterans Memorial Hwy) – Honeyville, Brigham City, Ogden, Salt Lake City; North 5200 West	Eastern terminus; diamond interchange; exit 378; eastern end of I-15 BL/SR-13 concurrency;
Elwood	5.7354	9.2302	SR-13 south (N 5200 West) – Bear River City, Corinne, Brigham City	Continuation south from eastern terminus
1.000 mi = 1.609 km; 1.000 km = 0.621 mi: Concurrency terminus

== See also ==
- List of business routes of the Interstate Highway System
- Business routes of Interstate 84
- List of named highway junctions in Utah
