= Business routes of Interstate 84 =

Interstate 84 Business

Location
- Country: United States

Highway system
- Interstate Highway System; Main; Auxiliary; Suffixed; Business; Future

Dozens of business routes of Interstate 84 (I-84) exist. The existing and former business routes are located along the western and eastern segments of I-84.

== Idaho ==
=== Caldwell–Nampa business loop ===
Interstate 84 Business
- Location: Caldwell–Nampa
- Length: 13.497 mi (21.721 km)
- Existed: 1985–present

Interstate 84 Business (I-84 Bus) is a business loop of I-84 from exit 27 in Caldwell to exit 38 in Nampa. It forms the terminus of State Highway 45 (SH-45) in downtown Nampa and State Highway 19 (SH-19) in downtown Caldwell.

The 11-mile (18 km) business loop follows the former alignment of U.S. Route 30 (US 30), which was moved to I-84 in 1985. I-84 Bus. was created in its place. The cities of Caldwell and Nampa requested that the business loop be relinquished by the state in 2019 due to it no longer functioning as a state highway. In 2022, the Idaho Transportation Board approved a proposal to decommission I-84 Bus. and extend SH-19 over a section of it in Caldwell, but await AASHTO approval.

=== Former Boise business loop ===
Interstate 84 Business
- Location: Boise

Interstate 84 Business (I-84 Bus) was a former business loop of I-84 in Boise. The route ran from what is today exits 49 and 54.

=== Mountain Home business loop ===
Interstate 84 Business
- Location: Mountain Home
- Length: 5.931 mi (9.545 km)

Interstate 84 Business (I-84 Bus) is a business loop of I-84 that serves Mountain Home between exit 90 and exit 95. It is partially concurrent with Idaho State Highway 51.

=== Hammett business loop ===
Interstate 84 Business
- Location: Hammett
- Length: 3.178 mi (5.114 km)

Interstate 84 Business (I-84 Bus) is a business loop of I-84 from exit 112 to both exit 114 in Hammett. It runs south from a full diamond interchange along SH-78 to former US Route 26 (US 26) and US 30 east to a half diamond interchange with I-84.

=== Glenns Ferry business loop ===
Interstate 84 Business
- Location: Glenns Ferry
- Length: 1.425 mi (2.293 km)

Interstate 84 Business (I-84 Bus) is a business loop of I-84 from exit 120 to exit 121 in Glenns Ferry. It runs south from a half diamond interchange along Bannock Street to former US 26 and US 30 east, ending at a full diamond interchange with I-84 at East First Avenue, which connects the two former segments of Old US 26–30.

=== Bliss business loop ===
Interstate 84 Business
- Location: Bliss
- Length: 3.518 mi (5.662 km)

Interstate 84 Business (I-84 Bus) is a business loop of I-84 from exit 137 to exit 141 in Bliss. It begins at an unconventional interchange, specifically one with a half diamond on the eastern quadrants, a wide flying westbound onramp on the northwest corner, and a long offramp with a connecting reentry ramp on the southwest corner. From there the runs southeast overlapping US 30. I-84 Bus/US 30 climbs an embankment for a bridge over a canal and a set of railroad tracks, then makes a left turn toward the northeast. The route curves back to the southeast at a fork in the road with Proctor Street just before officially crossing the city line at the triangle with South 650 East. Further in town, the road curves straight east at the intersection with 3rd Avenue, then passes by the local church and elementary school. Just after US 30 turns right at a frontage road along I-84, I-84 Bus ends at exit 141 (this time a conventional diamond interchange) and is taken over by US 26.

=== Burley–Heyburn business loop ===
Interstate 84 Business
- Location: Burley–Heyburn
- Length: 6.560 mi (10.557 km)

Interstate 84 Business (I-84 Bus) is a business loop of I-84 from exit 208, near Burley, to exit 211, serving Heyburn. It travels from the diamond interchange known as exit 208 at SH-27 south across a bridge over the Snake River, then turns east onto US 30. The two highways travel concurrently and pass by Burley Municipal Airport. They curve to the northeast and cross a second bridge over the Snake River, where they enter Heyburn. I-84 Bus eventually ends at a quarter cloverleaf interchange known as exit 211 with I-84. From there, US 30 joins I-84 in yet another concurrency, while the road that is used for I-84 Bus continues as SH-24.

== Utah ==
=== Tremonton business loop ===
Interstate 84 Business
- Location: Box Elder County
- Length: 5.7354 mi (9.2302 km)

Interstate 84 Business (I-84 Bus.) is a 5.7354-mile (9.2302 km) northern business loop off of I-84 that passes through Tremonton and Elwood and runs along State Route 102 (SR-102) and State Route 13 (SR-13) . It is the first business route on I-84 in the state and is mostly concurrent with I-15 Bus.

I-84 Bus. begins at exit 40 on I-84 in Tremonton and proceeds east along SR-102 (West Main Street) to pass under I-15 (with no access). At 1000 West (Iowa String Road), the two routes are joined by I-15 Bus from the north (after it passed by the Bear River Valley Hospital) and then all three routes (I-15 Bus., I-84 Bus., and SR-102) continue east on West Main Street. Upon crossing Tremonton Street, the three routes transition from West Main Street to East Main Street. Next the three routes connect with the southern end of Utah State Route 82 (North 300 East). Well beyond the developed areas of Tremonton the three routes reach an intersection with Utah State Route 13 (SR-13 / 1600 East) at Haws Corner Junction. At that intersection I-15 Bus. and I-84 Bus. both turn south onto SR-13. The three routes (I-15 Bus., I-84 Bus., and SR-13) continue south on South 1600 West to leave Tremonton and, about 3,500 feet (1,100 m) later, enter Elwood. The three routes then reach the southern terminus of I-15 Bus. and the eastern terminus of I-84 Bus. at Interstate 15 / I-84 (exit 376).

=== Brigham City business loop ===
Interstate 84 Business
- Location: Brigham City

Interstate 84 Business (I-84 Bus) is a business loop of I-84 along I-15 Bus in Brigham City.

The route begins at a folded diamond interchange with I-15/I-84 at exit 365 and runs south along SR-13. The reason for the folded diamond is due to the fact that the segment of SR-13 that the routes originally overlap runs along the north side of a Union Pacific Railroad line. The tracks move away from the road between North 1100th West Street, and 950th West Street, only to cross under a low bridge for another Union Pacific Railroad line, and then another bridge for North 500th West Street.

I-15 Bus/I-84 Bus/SR-13 curves to the right before turning south at the intersection with North Main Street, which is also the southern terminus of SR-38. The routes cross over a bridge over Box Elder Creek between 500th Street North and 400th Street North. At Forest Street, North Main Street becomes South Main Street, which runs under the Brigham City Archway. One and a half blocks later, they intersect 200th Street South, which also serves as the western terminus of SR-90, and instantly runs between the National Register of Historic Places-listed Box Elder Stake Tabernacle on the southeast corner of that intersection, and the contemporary but still traditional Brigham City Utah Temple on the southwest corner.

SR-13 ends at the southern terminus of the overlap of US 89/US 91, and I-15 Bus/I-84 Bus makes a sharp right turn along southbound US 91, while South Main Street is taken over by southbound US 89. I-15 Bus/I-84 Bus/US 91 runs west along West 1100th Street South. I-15 Bus/I-84 Bus ends at exit 362, a diverging diamond interchange with I-15/I-84, while West 1100th Street South continues into the I-15 frontage road, and becomes a dead-end street at the truck stop along the aforementioned frontage road.

=== Former Morgan business loop ===
Interstate 84 Business
- Location: Morgan

Interstate 84 Business (I-84 Bus) was a business loop of I-84 along in Morgan. It ran north along SR-66 at exit 103 (State Street) to East 600th Street running along the north side of I-84 until the former westbound-offramp and eastbound onramp that was once westbound exit 103 until the mid-1990s.

=== Former Henefer business loop ===
Interstate 84 Business
- Location: Henefer

Interstate 84 Business (I-84 Bus) was a business loop of I-84 along in Henefer. It ran southeast along the southwest side of I-84 on what is today SR-86 from exit 112 to SR-65 at exit 115.

== Connecticut ==
=== Former Newtown business loop ===
Interstate 84 Business
- Location: Newtown

Interstate 84 Business (I-84 Bus) was a former business loop of I-84 for Newtown. The route ran from what is today exit 9 at Route 25 in Hawleyville then runs along US 6 to exit 10 at Church Hill Road Route 34 in Sandy Hook.
