= Utah State Route 30 =

State highway in Utah, United States

State Route 30
- Bear Lake Scenic Byway; Valley View Highway
- SR 30 highlighted in red

Route information
- Maintained by UDOT
- Length: 135.620 mi (218.259 km) 223 miles (359 km) with implied connections
- Existed: 1966–present

Major junctions
- West end: SR 233 near Montello, NV
- I-84 near Snowville; I-15 near Tremonton; US 89 / US 91 in Logan; US 89 in Garden City
- East end: WYO 89 near Bear Lake

Location
- Country: United States
- State: Utah
- Counties: Box Elder, Cache, Rich

Highway system
- Utah State Highway System; Interstate; US; State; Minor; Scenic
← SR-29	→ SR-31

State Route 30 (SR-30) is a state highway in the U.S. state of Utah. It is the only highway signed as a Utah state route (with the beehive shaped route marker) to traverse the entire width of the state. The legal definition of the highway has 3 separate segments. With implied connections via Interstate 84 and U.S. Route 89, the highway is drivable as a continuous route from Nevada to Wyoming. The western segment is a historic corridor paralleling the pre-Lucin Cutoff routing of the First transcontinental railroad. A portion of the eastern segment has been designated the Bear Lake Scenic Byway as part of the Utah Scenic Byways program. The route was created in 1966 by combining several state highways into a single designation.

== Route description ==
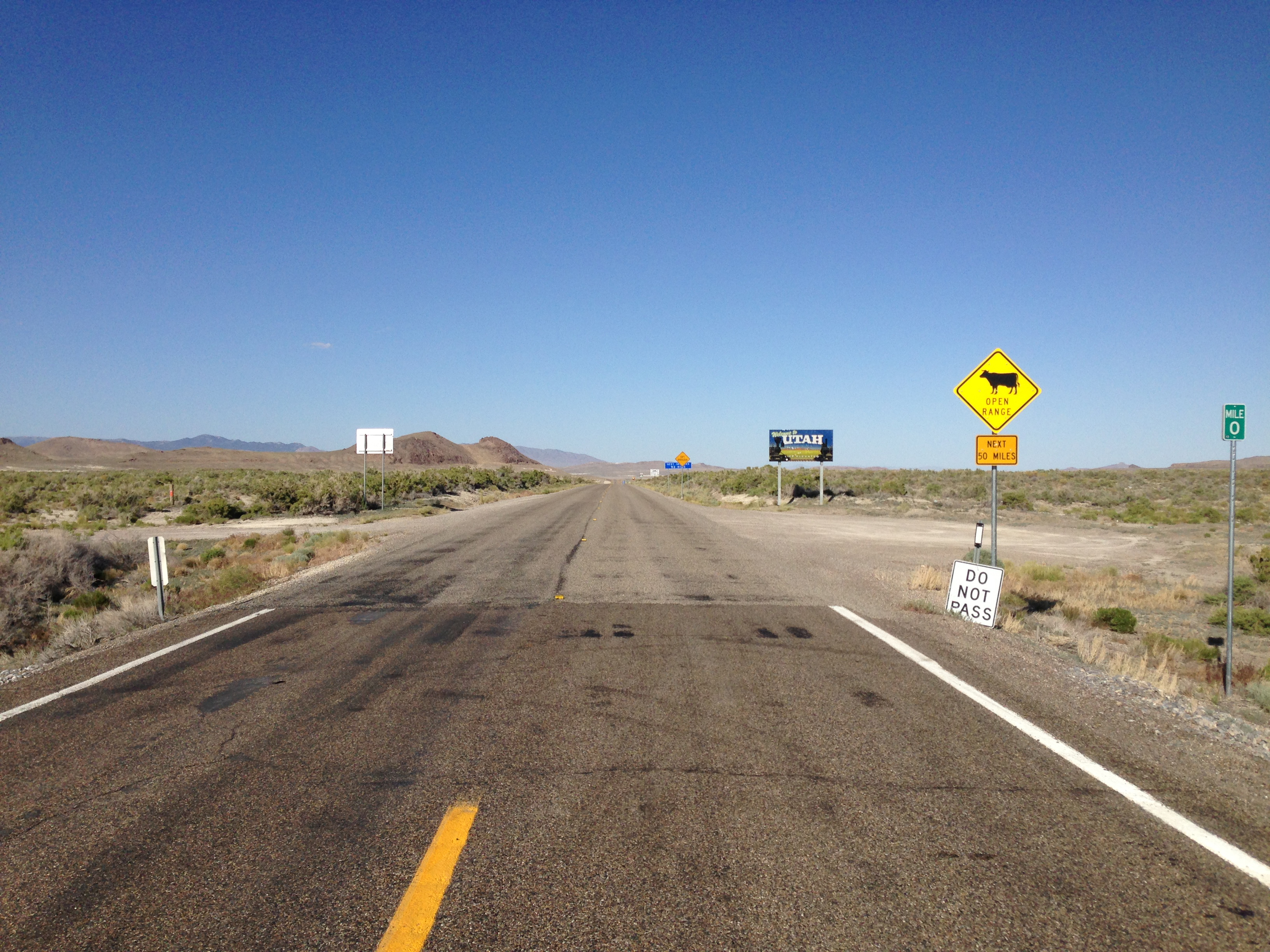
View east from the west end of SR 30 at the Nevada state line

SR-30 starts at the Nevada state line connecting with SR 233 and loosely follows the original route of the First transcontinental railroad around the north shore of the Great Salt Lake. The only communities along this section are Rosette and Park Valley. The highway connects with I-84 near Snowville. I-84 and I-15 connect the western segment with the central segment.

The central section begins near Tremonton just north of the separation of I-84 from I-15. It travels due east through a gap in the Wellsville Mountains created by the Bear River. The highway crests a hill and has a view of Cache Valley which gives the highway its nickname, the Valley View Highway. The central section joins US-89 in downtown Logan. The segment between 3200 West in Cache County and the US-89/US-91 junction in Logan is part of the National Highway System. US-89 connects the central segment with the eastern segment.

The eastern section branches off from US-89 at Garden City and follows the south shore of Bear Lake to Laketown. The highway then cuts across to the Wyoming state line where it continues as WYO 89.

== History ==
The western portion follows the general corridor used by the California Trail, as well as the First transcontinental railroad, completed in 1869. This portion of the railroad was bypassed with the construction of the Lucin Cutoff across the Great Salt Lake. Later the road would be part of the Midland Trail, and it was added to the state highway system in 1912. The entire roadway from Nevada via Snowville to Tremonton remained a state highway through 1925, but in 1927 the portion west of Curlew Junction was dropped, with the remainder serving as part of U.S. Route 30S (US-30S), designated in 1926, which continued northwest to Idaho. The road to the Nevada state line, where it continued as SR 30, was restored in 1931 as State Route 70.

The central portion, between Tremonton and Logan, was added to the state highway system in 1931 as SR-102 (Tremonton to Deweyville) and SR-69 (Deweyville to Logan). From 1938 until the mid-1950s, the SR-69 portion was marked as US-89, which, instead of overlapping US-91, followed the longer all-weather route from Brigham City into the Cache Valley. Various cutoffs were formed at the west end: State Route 154 came first in 1933, connecting SR-41 (now SR-82) in Garland with SR-69 near Collinston via Garland Road. State Route 85 was built in 1940 as a federal aid project, connecting SR-41 (now SR-13) in Riverside with SR-154, and numbered by the legislature in 1945, only to be given back to the county in 1953. The roadway from Riverside east to SR-154 was brought back into the state highway system in 1962 as part of SR-84, which was to end at a junction with the proposed I-15 between Riverside and Collinston. When SR-154 was deleted in 1969, the SR-84 designation was extended east to Collinston, replacing part of that route. By 1982, proposed I-15 had been moved west to its current alignment north of Tremonton, and a new State Route 129 was created to connect it with Riverside. For continuity, SR-13 (which had replaced SR-84 in 1977) was cut back to Riverside, with the Riverside-Collinston portion also becoming SR-129. In 1969 the piece east of Bothwell Junction became part of a western extension of SR-102.

The portion east of Garden City was added to the state highway system in 1910 (Garden City to Sage Creek Junction) and 1915 (Sage Creek Junction to Wyoming). The former became part of SR-3 in the 1920s, and in 1927 the legislature added the latter as a branch of that route, only to split it off as State Route 51 in 1931. SR-3 was renumbered to SR-16 in 1962.

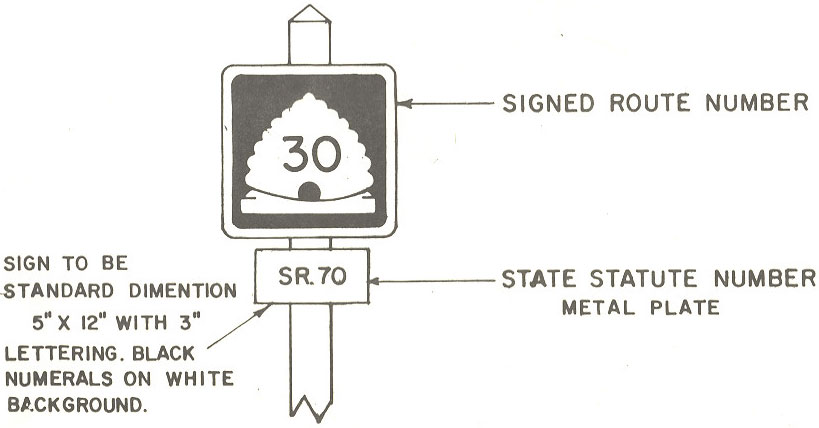
Signage used from 1966 to 1977 on SR-30

In 1966, the counties in northern Utah requested that the State Road Commission designate a single route number to run east–west across that part of the state. Since Nevada's portion of the highway, connecting to US 40 at Oasis, was numbered SR 30 (changed to SR 233 in the late 1970s), Utah selected that number, and requested that Wyoming similarly redesignate their Highway 89, which connected to US 30N (now US 30) at Sage. (Wyoming never did so.) The former SR-30 in Sanpete County was renumbered SR-117. However, unlike other renumberings, the commission did not request that the legislature change the legal descriptions; instead, since such a change "would involve a tremendous number of changes in our present record keeping system", the old numbers were kept and marked on small rectangular signs below the SR-30 shields. SR-30 was marked along the following routes:

- SR-70, Nevada to Curlew Junction
- US-30S, Curlew Junction to Snowville
- I-80N, Snowville to Bothwell Junction (now I-84)
- SR-102, Bothwell Junction to Deweyville
- SR-69, Deweyville to Logan
- US-89/US-91 in Logan
- US-89, Logan to Garden City
- SR-16, Garden City to Sage Creek Junction
- SR-51, Sage Creek Junction to Wyoming

In the 1977 renumbering, the legislative designation was changed to SR-30, except on the portions that were signed as U.S. or Interstate Highways (hence the gaps at I-84 and US-89). No signage changes were required except for the removal of the rectangular signs below the SR-30 shields. In 1989, the commission resolved that, once I-15 was completed north of Tremonton, SR-30 would be rerouted to replace SR-129, with SR-102 and SR-69 (now SR-38) being extended back to Deweyville and Collinston.

== Major intersections ==
County	Location	mi	km	Destinations	Notes
Box Elder		0.00	0.00	SR 233 to I-80 – Montello, Oasis	Continuation beyond Nevada state line; West end of SR-30 western segment
Box Elder		8.733	14.054	Grouse Creek, Lucin	
Box Elder		24.771	39.865	Watercress	former rail siding on the First transcontinental railroad
Box Elder		56.346	90.680	California Trail	
Box Elder		64.655	104.052	Kelton	former rail siding on the First transcontinental railroad
Box Elder		74.693	120.207	SR-42 west – Malta	Curlew Junction/former U.S. Route 30S; Eastern Terminus of SR-42;
Box Elder		90.347	145.399	I-84 – Salt Lake City, Boise, Ogden, Twin Falls	I-84 exit 5; Park Valley Interchange.
Box Elder		90.615	145.831	25600 North – Snowville	Continuation of roadway beyond I-84; East end of SR-30 western segment
Box Elder	Gap in route				
Box Elder		90.616	145.832	End of roadway	West end of SR-30 center segment
Box Elder		90.698	145.964	I-15 to I-84 – Pocatello	I-15 exit 385; Riverside/Logan Interchange
Box Elder	Riverside	91.901	147.900	SR-13 – Riverside	
Box Elder	Riverside	93.150	149.910	SR-81 – Fielding	
Box Elder		94.953	152.812	SR-38 – Deweyville	
Box Elder		97.755	157.321	Cutler Reservoir	
Cache		102.347	164.712	SR-23 – Petersboro, Mendon	
Cache	Logan	108.661	174.873	SR-252	
Cache	Logan	109.930	176.915	US 89 / US 91 – Brigham City, Smithfield, Bear Lake	East end of SR-30 center segment
Gap in route
Rich	Garden City	109.931	176.917	US 89 – Paris	West end of SR-30 eastern segment; West end of Bear Lake Scenic Byway
Rich		113.864	183.246	Ideal Beach	
Rich		117.947	189.817	Rendezvous Beach	
Rich	Laketown	119.711	192.656	Main Street	East end of Bear Lake Scenic Byway
Rich		131.686	211.928	SR-16 – Randolph	Sage Creek Junction
Rich		135.620	218.259	WYO 89 to US 30 – Kemmerer	Continuation beyond Wyoming state line; East end of SR-30 eastern segment
1.000 mi = 1.609 km; 1.000 km = 0.621 mi
