= Utah State Route 13 =

State highway in Utah, United States

State Route 13
- SR-13 highlighted in red

Route information
- Maintained by UDOT
- Length: 33.135 mi (53.326 km)
- Existed: 1977–present

Major junctions
- South end: US 89 / US 91 in Brigham City
- I-15 / I-84 in Brigham City; SR-83 in Corinne; I-15 / I-84 in Elwood; SR-102 in Tremonton; SR-30 in Riverside
- North end: I-15 near Plymouth

Location
- Country: United States
- State: Utah

Highway system
- Utah State Highway System; Interstate; US; State; Minor; Scenic
← SR-12	→ SR-14

State Route 13 (SR-13) is a state highway in northern Utah, running 32.841 miles (52.852 km) parallel to I-15 in Box Elder County from Brigham City to Riverside. Most of SR-13 is a former routing of U.S. Route 191.

== Route description ==
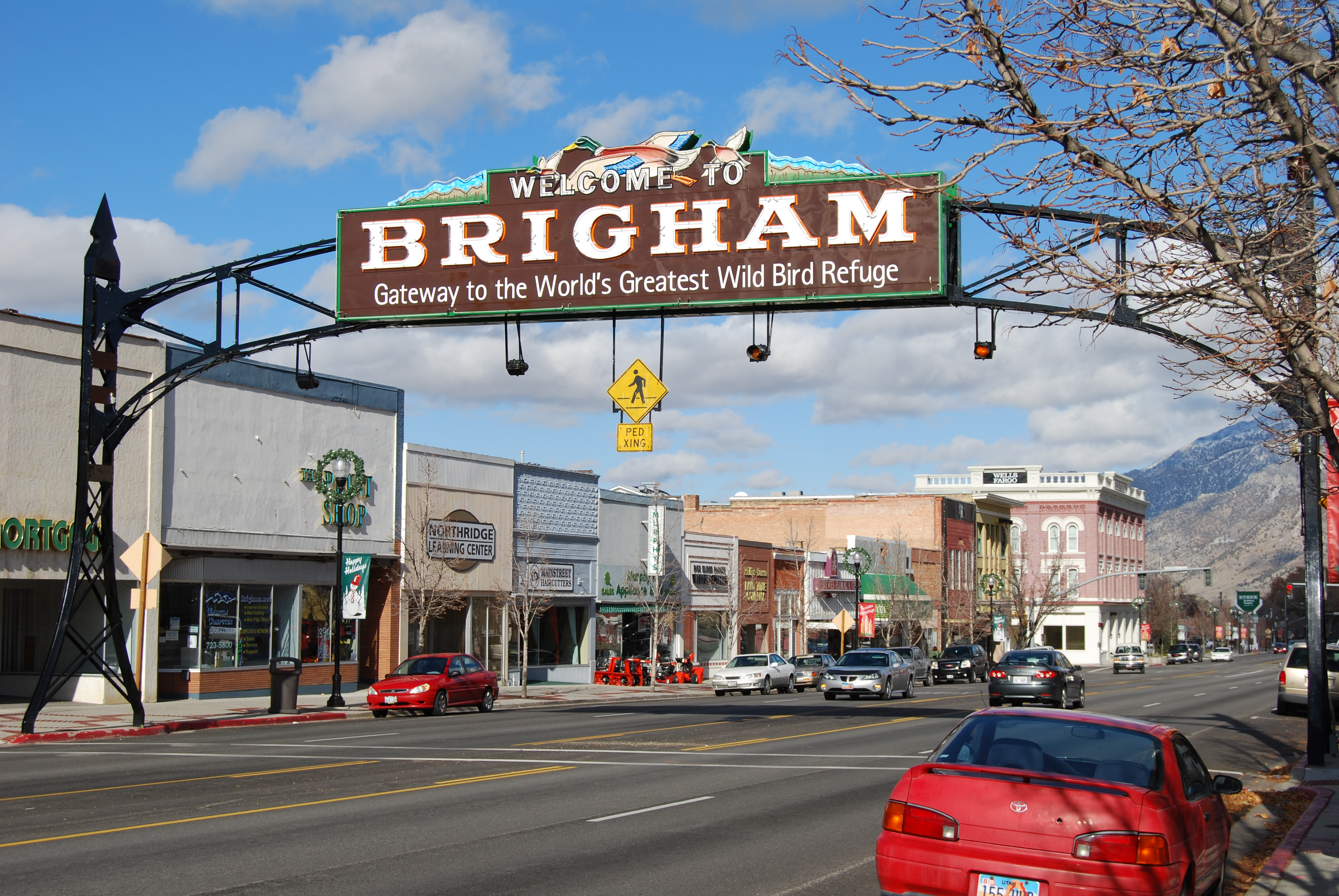
Brigham City gantry on SR-13, November 2007

SR-13 begins at an intersection with US-89 and US-91 at the south end of Brigham City and heads north through the city, then turns west at the north end of the city to intersect I-15 and I-84. It continues northwest across the Bear River through Corinne and turns north parallel to I-15 and I-84 through Bear River City. It intersects I-15 and I-84 at Elwood and continues north around the east side of Tremonton.

North of Tremonton, SR-13 continues north through Riverside and Plymouth, turning northwest to end at another intersection with I-15 near Plymouth.

== History ==
The road from SR-1 (by 1926 US-91, now SR-90) in Brigham City north to the Idaho state line became a state highway in 1910. It was initially assigned the State Route 17 designation in the 1920s, but in 1927 the state legislature changed the designation to State Route 41. The portion south of SR-42 (now SR-102) in Tremonton became part of U.S. Route 30S in 1926, and the entire route became Utah's portion of a southern extension of U.S. Route 191 in the late 1930s. A new alignment around Tremonton and Garland was defined in 1935, with the old route becoming SR-82.

The SR-41 designation was dropped in 1962, as State Routes 1 to 5 were assigned to proposed Interstate Highways (in Utah law; the routes were never signed as such), and SR-41 was on the route of I-15, which was SR-1 under Utah law. However, since I-15 near Brigham City was almost complete, only the portion of SR-41 north of Riverside was assigned SR-1; the remainder was instead renumbered as an extension of SR-84, which had ended at Hot Springs Junction north of Ogden. Since the original proposed alignment of I-15 would have passed east of Tremonton and Riverside, this extension of SR-84 turned east at Riverside, following present SR-30 to SR-154 (Garland Road). When SR-154 was removed from the state highway system in 1969, SR-84 was extended farther east over part of it to SR-69 (now SR-38) near Collinston. Finally, in the 1977 renumbering, the part of SR-84 between Hot Springs Junction and Brigham City was redesignated US-89, and State Route 13 was created for the portion between Brigham City and Collinston.

By 1982, proposed I-15 had been moved west to its current alignment north of Tremonton, and a new SR-129 was created to connect it with Riverside along present SR-30. For continuity, SR-13 was cut back to Riverside, with the Riverside-Collinston portion also becoming SR-129. SR-13 was extended north from Riverside to I-15 at exit 392 near Plymouth in 1988, replacing what had been maintained as temporary I-15. A small realignment was made in 2008 at the SR-83 intersection in Corinne, moving SR-13 from the diagonal routing alongside the rail line to a straight north–south routing on 4800 West.

== Major intersections ==
The entire route is in Box Elder County.

Location	mi	km	Destinations	Notes
Brigham City	0.000	0.000	US 89 / US 91 (1100 South) – Ogden, Logan	Southern terminus
Brigham City	1.343	2.161	SR-90 east (200 South) – US-89/US-91	Western Terminus of SR-90
Brigham City	2.872	4.622	SR-38 north (Main Street) – Honeyville	Southern Terminus of SR-38
Brigham City	5.498– 5.728	8.848– 9.218	I-15 / I-84 – Salt Lake City, Ogden, Tremonton	I-15 exit 365
Corinne	9.158	14.738	SR-83 west – Thiokol, Golden Spike National Historic Site	Eastern Terminus of SR-83
Elwood	17.825– 18.069	28.687– 29.079	I-15 / I-84 – Salt Lake City, Ogden, Snowville	I-15 exit 376; south end of I-15 Bus. and I-84 Bus. concurrencies
Tremonton	20.176	32.470	SR-102 (East Main Street, 11200 North) / I-15 BL north / I-84 BL west – Deweyville	Haws Corner Junction (Crossroads); north end of I-15 Bus. and I-84 Bus. concurrencies
	22.703	36.537	SR-82 south – Garland	Northern Terminus of SR-82
	22.078	35.531	To SR-82 (12800 North/Factory Street)	Near Garland; former SR-154
Riverside	25.250	40.636	SR-30 (15200 North) – I-15, Logan	
Riverside	27.313	43.956	16800 North – Fielding	Former SR-81
Garland	32.960	53.044	I-15 – Ogden, Pocatello	Northern terminus; Near Plymouth; I-15 exit 392;
1.000 mi = 1.609 km; 1.000 km = 0.621 mi: Concurrency terminus; Proposed; Incomplete access; Route transition

== See also ==
- List of state highways in Utah
