= Interstate 15 Business (Tremonton, Utah) =

Interstate highway business loop in Box Elder County, Utah, United States

Interstate 15 Business
- I-15 Bus. highlighted in red

Route information
- Business route of I-15
- Maintained by UDOT
- Length: 6.0264 mi (9.6986 km)

Major junctions
- South end: I-15 / I-84 / I-84 BL / SR-13 in Elwood
- SR-13 / SR-102 in Tremonton; SR-82 in Tremonton; I-84 BL / SR-102 in Tremonton
- East end: I-15 in Tremonton

Location
- Country: United States
- State: Utah
- Counties: Box Elder

Highway system
- Interstate Highway System; Main; Auxiliary; Suffixed; Business; Future; Utah State Highway System; Interstate; US; State; Minor; Scenic

Interstate 15 Business Loop (I-15 BL) is a 6.0264-mile (9.6986 km) eastern business loop off of I-15 in Box Elder County, Utah, that passes through Elwood and Tremonton. It is partially concurrent with I-84 BL and is the last business route along I-15 in the state.

== Route description ==
I-15 BL begins along Utah State Route 13 (SR-13) at a diamond interchange on I-15/I-84 (exit 376) in Elwood. (I-15/I-84 heads north and west toward Tremonton, Riverside, and Snowville in Utah and then on to Malad City, Pocatello, and Twin Falls in Idaho. I-15/I-84 heads south and east toward Honeyville, Brigham City, Ogden, and Salt Lake City. SR-13 heads south toward Bear River City, Corrine, and Brigham City.) From its southern terminus, I-15 BL proceeds north along North 5200 West, concurrent with I-84 BL/SR-13, to leave Elwood (at West 10400 North) and enter Tremonton, about 3,500 feet (1,100 m) later (at about 400 South). Upon entering Tremonton, North 5200 West becomes South 1600 East. After reaching Haws Corner Junction at East Main Street, I-15 BL/I-84 BL turns to west (left) to run along Utah State Route 102 (SR-102/East Main Street) as they leave their concurrency with SR-13. (SR-13 continues north along North 5200 West toward Riverside and Plymouth and SR-102 heads east along West 11200 North toward Deweyville and Logan.)

Proceeding west I-15 BL/I-84 BL/SR-102 reaches its junction with the southern end of Utah State Route 82 (North 300 East) at a T intersection. (SR-82 heads north along North 300 East toward Garland.) At Tremonton Street, the three routes transition from transition from East Main Street to West Main Street. Next I-15 BL leaves the concurrency with I-84 BL/SR-10 when it turns north at the intersection with North 1000 West (Iowa String Road) on the southeast corner of the Box Elder County Fairgrounds. (I-84 Bus./SR-102 continues west to pass under I-15 and on to I-84. Iowa String Road [South 1000 West] heads south toward Utah State Route 83 and Corinne) Proceeding north again, I-15 Bus. runs along North 1000 West to pass by the east side of the fairgrounds and the Bear River Valley Hospital.

Immediately after passing the hospital, I-15 BL makes another left turn to proceed west on West 1000 North and pass by the north side of the hospital. (North 1000 West continues north toward Garland and West 1000 North continues east toward Garland and SR-13.) Continuing west on West 1000 North I-15 Bus. until finally reaches its northern terminus at another diamond interchange on I-15 (exit 381) on the northern edge of Tremonton. (I-15 heads north toward Riverside in Utah and then on to Malad City and Pocatello in Idaho. I-15 heads south to merge with I-84 and then on toward Elwood, Honeyville, Brigham City, Ogden, and Salt Lake City. West 1000 North continues west to end at I-84.)

While fairly adequate signage previously existed along both I-15 BL and I-84 BL, by 2024, it was extremely limited. (Note: As of 2024 the only remaining shields for northbound I-15 BL are one on the exit 1 mile advance guide sign (but not the exit 1/2 mile advance guide sign, nor the interchange exit direction sign) and one directional shield on the I-15/I-84 off ramp (exit 378). Both of those also included a shield for Interstate 84 Business. The only remaining shield along southbound is on the exit 1 mile advance guide signs, but not the interchange exit direction sign.)

== Major intersections ==
The entire route is in Box Elder County.

Location	mi	km	Destinations	Notes
Elwood	0.0000	0.0000	SR-13 south (N 5200 West) – Bear River City, Corinne, Brigham City	Continuation south from southern terminus
Elwood	0.0000– 0.2436	0.0000– 0.3920	I-15 north (Veterans Memorial Hwy) / I-84 west (Vietnam Veterans Memorial Hwy) – Tremonton, Riverside, Snowville, Malad City, Pocatello, Twin Falls I-15 south (Veterans Memorial Hwy) / I-84 east (Vietnam Veterans Memorial Hwy) – Honeyville, Brigham City, Ogden, Salt Lake City; I-84 BL east end (N 5200 West)	southern terminus; diamond interchange; exit 378; Southern end of I-84 BL/SR-13 concurrency;
Tremonton	2.3520	3.7852	SR-13 north (N 1600 East) – Plymouth, Pocatello SR-102 east (E Main St) – Deweyville, Logan	Haws Corner Junction (also known as Crossroads); northern end of SR-13 concurrency; southern end of SR-102 concurrency
Tremonton	3.3580	5.4042	SR-82 north (N 300 East) – Garland	T-intersection
Tremonton	4.3553	7.0092	I-84 BL west (W Main St) / SR-102 west – I-84, Golden Spike National Historical Park; S 1000 West (Iowa String Rd) – Corinne	Northern end of I-84 BL/SR-102 concurrency
Tremonton	5.3657	8.6353	N 1000 West (Iowa String Rd) north – Garland; W 1000 North east – Garland	Northeast corner of Bear River Valley Hospital
Tremonton	5.8628– 6.0264	9.4353– 9.6986	I-15 north (Veterans Memorial Hwy) – Riverside, Malad City, Pocatello I-15 south (Veterans Memorial Hwy) – Honeyville, Brigham City, Ogden, Salt Lake City	Northern terminus; diamond interchange; exit 381
Tremonton	6.0264	9.6986	W 1000 North west	Continuation west from northern terminus
1.000 mi = 1.609 km; 1.000 km = 0.621 mi: Concurrency terminus

== See also ==
- List of business routes of the Interstate Highway System
- Business routes of Interstate 15
- List of named highway junctions in Utah
