= 1962 Utah state route renumbering =

This article is part of the highway renumbering series.
Alabama	1928, 1957
Arkansas	1926
California	1964
Colorado	1953, 1968
Connecticut	1932, 1963
Florida	1945
Indiana	1926
Iowa	1926, 1969
Louisiana	1955
Maine	1933
Massachusetts	1933
Minnesota	1934
Missouri	1926
Montana	1932
Nebraska	1926
Nevada	1976
New Jersey	1927, 1953
New Mexico	1988
New York	1927, 1930
North Carolina	1934, 1937, 1940, 1961
Ohio	1923, 1927, 1962
Pennsylvania	1928, 1961
Puerto Rico	1953
South Carolina	1928, 1937
South Dakota	1927, 1975
Tennessee	1983
Texas	1939
Utah	1962, 1977
Virginia	1923, 1928, 1933, 1940, 1958
Washington	1964
Wisconsin	1926
Wyoming	1927

Coinciding with the designation of several routes in the Interstate Highway System through Utah, the Utah State Legislature made several changes to the Utah State Route system. The bulk of these changes were not visible to the public, but were to unsigned legislative designations only. The primary effect was reserving route numbers 1 through 5 for the future corridors of the Interstate Highways in Utah. Several other routes were truncated or reassigned or split into multiple designations to allow the Interstate Highway corridors to have a single route number assigned. As very little of the Interstate Highway System had been constructed in Utah by 1962, these changes were primarily to support future construction. There were a number of cases where the legislative change enacted in 1962 would not be built and signed until years later. There were also changes made to a few unsigned highways serving state parks and institutions. Few of the changes made in 1962 are still valid today. As construction of the Interstate Highway system proceeded, additional changes were made. The legislature made a larger change in route designations in 1977, eliminating unsigned legislative designations and concurrences, in the process making most of the 1962 changes obsolete.

Though dozens of changes were required, most were to support the following five major changes:

- State Route 1 was changed to follow the proposed route of Interstate 15 from following U.S. Route 91. While the two routes were similar, they were not identical. As a result several segments where the two routes differed were assigned new designations.
- State Route 2 was assigned to the Interstate 80 corridor. Route 2 had previously been used for the legislative designation of U.S. Route 89 through Logan Canyon. A significant portion of the then future I-80 corridor was designated SR-4 prior to 1962, but the two corridors had different routes through the Salt Lake Valley. New route designations were created for the segments where the two differed.
- State Route 3 was assigned to the then I-80N corridor (modern Interstate 84), it had previously been used for a highway along the western shore of Bear Lake (modern US-89 and SR-30). The eastern portion of the I-80N corridor had a single designation, SR-5, however the western portion had previously been split among multiple route numbers.
- State Route 4 was assigned to the Interstate 70 corridor. SR-4 had been assigned to a Nevada to Wyoming corridor similar, but not identical, to the route of modern I-80 (designated SR-2 with this renumbering). As the I-70 corridor would require connecting multiple previous state routes and new construction, a number of highways were truncated and re-designated to free up this corridor.
- State Route 5 was assigned to the proposed corridor Interstate 215. Previously SR-5 was used for the eastern portion of then U.S. Route 30S, now Interstate 84 (from Ogden through Weber Canyon to Echo).

Post 1962 Designation	Pre 1962 Designation	Current Designation	From	To
State Route 1	State Route 1	I-15	Arizona	Hot Springs
State Route 1	None	I-15	Hot Springs	East of Riverside
State Route 1	State Route 41	I-15	East of Riverside	Idaho
State Route 2	State Route 4	I-80	Nevada	Lake Point Junction
State Route 2	State Route 67	I-80	Lake Point Junction	Salt Lake City
State Route 2	None	I-80	Salt Lake City	Parleys Canyon
State Route 2	State Route 4	I-80	Parleys Canyon	Wyoming
State Route 3	None	I-84	Idaho	Snowville
State Route 3	State Route 42	I-84	Snowville	Haws Corner
State Route 3	State Route 5	I-84	Ogden	Echo Junction
State Route 4	State Route 13	I-70	Cove Fort	Sevier
State Route 4	State Route 10	I-70	Salina	Fremont Junction
State Route 4	None	I-70	Fremont Junction	Green River
State Route 4	State Route 8	I-70	Green River	Colorado
State Route 5	None	I-215	Parleys Canyon	North of Salt Lake City
State Route 8	State Route 8	US-89, US-6	Springville	Green River
State Route 10	State Route 10	SR-10	Fremont Junction	Price
State Route 13	State Route 2	US-89	Logan	Garden City
State Route 16	State Route 3	SR-16, SR-30, US-89	Wyoming	Idaho
State Route 42	State Route 42	SR-42, SR-30	Idaho	Snowville
State Route 67	State Route 181A	ex-SR-281	Dixie Junior College	St. George
State Route 84	State Route 84	SR-126	Roy	Hot Springs
State Route 84	State Route 1	US-89	Hot Springs	Brigham
State Route 84	State Route 41	SR-13	Brigham	East of Riverside
State Route 85	State Route 85	US-91	Southwest of Brigham	Brigham
State Route 85	State Route 1	US-91	Brigham	Idaho
State Route 171	State Route 4	SR-171	Magna	Salt Lake City
State Route 171	State Route 171	SR-171, I-215	Salt Lake City	Parleys Canyon
State Route 181A	None	SR-282	University of Utah	Salt Lake City
State Route 201	State Route 4	SR-201	Lake Point Junction	Magna
State Route 201	State Route 201	SR-201	Magna	Salt Lake City
State Route 201	State Route 4	2100 South	Salt Lake City	Parleys Canyon

== See also ==
- State highways deleted by the Utah State Legislature in 1969
