= 1977 Utah state route renumbering =

This article is part of the highway renumbering series.
Alabama	1928, 1957
Arkansas	1926
California	1964
Colorado	1953, 1968
Connecticut	1932, 1963
Florida	1945
Indiana	1926
Iowa	1926, 1969
Louisiana	1955
Maine	1933
Massachusetts	1933
Minnesota	1934
Missouri	1926
Montana	1932
Nebraska	1926
Nevada	1976
New Jersey	1927, 1953
New Mexico	1988
New York	1927, 1930
North Carolina	1934, 1937, 1940, 1961
Ohio	1923, 1927, 1962
Pennsylvania	1928, 1961
Puerto Rico	1953
South Carolina	1928, 1937
South Dakota	1927, 1975
Tennessee	1983
Texas	1939
Utah	1962, 1977
Virginia	1923, 1928, 1933, 1940, 1958
Washington	1964
Wisconsin	1926
Wyoming	1927

In 1977, the Utah State Legislature changed its system of how state route numbers were used and assigned. Prior to 1977 Utah used a system where every U.S. Highway and Interstate Highway traversing the state was assigned a different Utah state route number. There were many instances where having different route numbers for signing and legislative purposes could cause confusion. For example, the highway signed Interstate 15 in Utah was legislatively defined State Route 1, not route 15. State Route 15 also existed, but was a different route that passed through Zion National Park.

In 1977, the state changed to a system where all highways would have the same legislative route number as its signed route number. For example, Interstate 15 would also be route 15 for legislative purposes. Many state routes were re-numbered to eliminate instances where a state route used the same number as a U.S. Highway or Interstate Highway traversing the state.

In cases where two or more routes overlapped, only one of the route numbers sharing the same roadbed would be used in the legislative designation. The other routes in the overlap would have a discontinuity in the legislative description. For example, the stretch of highway between Green River and Crescent Junction is legislatively designated only Interstate 70. The other highways using this same pavement, U.S. Route 6, U.S. Route 50 and U.S. Route 191 all have legislative gaps in their routes for this portion.

Pre 1977 state route number	Route description	Post 1977 state route number	Notes
1	Legislative designation for I-15 also US-91 prior to 1974.	15	
2	Legislative designation for I-80	80	
3	Legislative designation for I-84	84	
4	Legislative designation for I-70	70	
5	Legislative designation for Interstate 215	215	
6	Legislative designation for US-40	40	SR-6 immediately re-used as legislative designation for US-6
7	Legislative designation for US-189	189	SR-7 was later re-used for an unrelated highway.
8	Legislative designation for U.S. Route 89 from Moark Junction to north of Lehi	89	SR-8 was later re-used for an unrelated highway.
9	Legislative designation for current US-191 between Crescent Junction and Monticello and US-491 between Monticello and Colorado. At one time these highways had a single signed designation, U.S. Route 160	163, 666	SR-9 was immediately re-used on an unrelated highway. This portion of 163 has since been re-numbered 191, and 666 has been completely replaced with 491.
11	Legislative designation for US-89 and US-89A from state line to junction with I-70	89/89A	Kept and signed as designation for US-89A south of Kanab. Formally replaced with route 89A in 2008.
13	Legislative designation for US-89 from Logan to Bear Lake	89	SR-13 immediately re-used for an unrelated route.
15	Zion Park Scenic Byway	9	SR-15 immediately re-used as the legislative designation for I-15
16	Route along the western shore of Bear Lake from the Wyoming state line near Woodruff to the state line near Paris, Idaho	16, Eastern segment of 30, 89	Route truncated, the southern portion remains SR-16 today, while the northern portion was transferred to other routes, including the part signed as US-89.
26	A signed route between Delta and Salina, now part of US-50.	50	SR-26 immediately re-used for former SR-50. SR-50 and 26 exchanged designations
27	Legislative designation for US-6 from the Nevada state line to Green River	6	
28	Route formerly continued south of its current terminus at Gunnison as a legislative designation for a portion of US-89 to Salina	89, 28	Portion used for US-89 truncated, independent portion kept
32	Legislative designation for U.S. Route 89 from SR-28 at Gunnison to US-6 at Thistle, Utah	89	SR-32 eventually reused for a former portion of U.S. Route 189
35	Route formerly continued north from current terminus as the legislative designation for US-189 north to I-80	189, 35	Portion used for US-189 truncated, independent portion kept
40	North–south road west of Ogden	134	SR-40 immediately re-used as the legislative designation for US-40
47	Legislative designation for U.S. Route 163 from Arizona to Monticello, was signed prior to 1971.	163	North of Bluff has since been redesignated US-191
49	Legislative designation for US-89 between I-15 near Lagoon to I-84 near Ogden	89	
50	Riverdale Road in Riverdale and Ogden	26	SR-50 immediately re-used as the legislative designation for US-50. SR-50 and 26 exchanged designations
51	Connector between SR-16 and the Wyoming state line in the far north eastern corner of Utah	Eastern segment of 30	
69	Alternate route between Brigham City and Logan via Bear River canyon.	Central segment of 30, 69	The southern portion of the route (south of Deweyville) kept the SR-69 designation; later extended north to Collinston; to be later renumbered SR-38
70	Route along the north shore of the Great Salt Lake in extreme northern part of the state	Western segment of 30	SR-70 immediately re-used as the legislative designation for I 70.
80	Alpine Loop Scenic Byway	92	SR-80 immediately re-used as the legislative designation for I-80
84	Segment of former US-91 near Roy	126, 13	SR-84 immediately re-used as the legislative designation for I-84
85	Legislative Designation for the reroute of US-91 bypassing downtown Brigham City	91	
89	Bypass of Eden, Utah	169	SR-89 immediately re-used as the legislative designation for US-89 SR-169 has since been removed from the state route system.
102	East of Lampo Junction to Deweyville	30, 102	
106	Becks to Farmington (part was the legislate route of US 89)	89, 106	
151	Legislative designation for US-189 from Francis to Hailstone Junction	189	
163	Segment of former US-91 near Levan	78	SR-163 immediately re-used as the legislative designation for US-163
169	Legislative designation for US-89 from SR 106 in Bountiful to north of Bountiful	89	
259	Legislative designation for US-89 from Kanab to the Arizona border	89	
271	Legislative designation for U.S. Route 89 from Near Draper Crossroads to SR 106 in Becks	89	
