= 1962 renumbering =

1962 renumbering may refer to:

- 1962 Utah state route renumbering
- 1962 Ohio state highway renumbering
