= Utah State Route 102 =

State highway in Utah, United States

State Route 102

Route information
- Maintained by UDOT
- Length: 20.072 mi (32.303 km)
- Existed: 1931–present

Major junctions
- West end: SR-83 near Lampo Junction
- I-84 at Bothwell Junction; SR-13 at Haws Corner
- East end: SR-38 in Deweyville

Location
- Country: United States
- State: Utah

Highway system
- Utah State Highway System; Interstate; US; State; Minor; Scenic
← SR-101	→ SR-103

State Route 102 (SR-102) is a state highway in the U.S. state of Utah that connects Tremonton with I-84, SR-83, and the towns of Deweyville, Bothwell, Thatcher, Penrose, and Thiokol's facility in Box Elder County.

== Route description ==
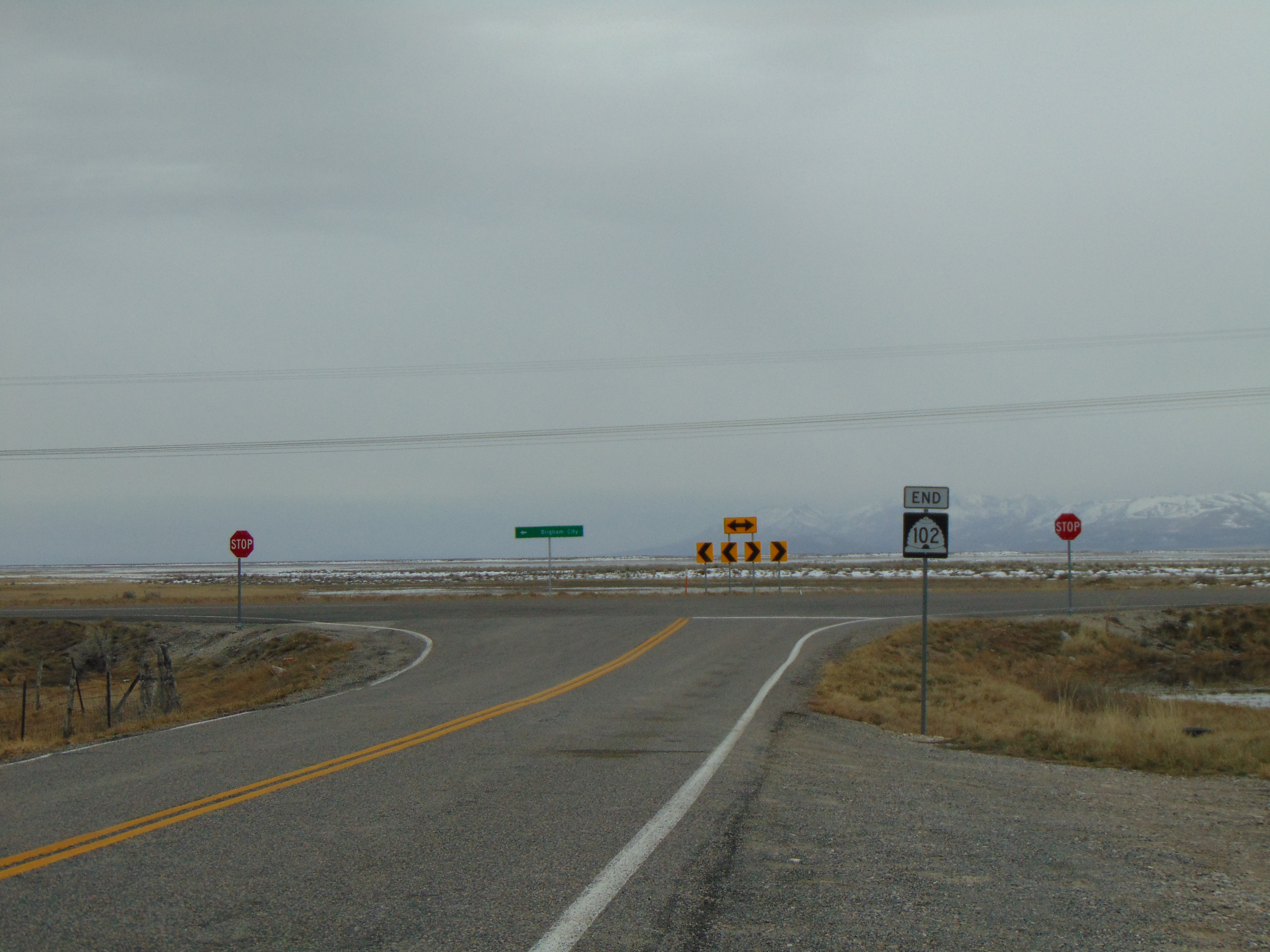
Western terminus at SR-83

The route starts on SR-83 east of Lampo Junction travelling northeast. After about 2 miles (3.2 km), the route starts to "stairstep", alternately going north and east through Penrose and Thatcher, before settling on an easterly direction through Bothwell. Soon after, the route intersects I-84 at Bothwell Junction, passes under I-15, passes through Tremonton and Haws Corner Junction and ending at SR-38 in Deweyville at the base of the Wellsville Mountains.

== History ==
SR-102 was originally designated in 1931 as the road from Deweyville to Haws Corner. In 1969, the route was extended westward through Tremonton to SR-83 east of Lampo Junction (this stretch of road was formerly part of SR-3).

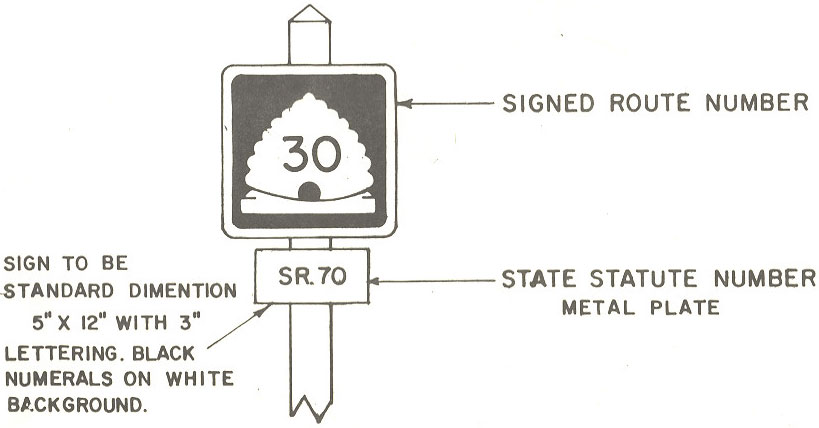
Signage used from 1966 to 1977 on SR-30

In 1966, the counties in northern Utah requested that the State Road Commission designate a single route number to run east–west across that part of the state. This route overlapped SR-102 between Deweyville and I-84. For this new route, the number SR-30 was selected, but there were no legislative description changes of the highways. Instead, the old route numbers were kept and marked on small, rectangular signs below the SR-30 shields.

In the 1977 renumbering, the legislative description of this new route was changed to SR-30, resulting in SR-102's eastern terminus being moved to I-84. In 1989, the commission resolved that, once I-15 was completed north of Tremonton, SR-30 would be rerouted to replace SR-129, with SR-102 being extended back to Deweyville.

== Major intersections ==
The entire route is in Box Elder County.

Location	mi	km	Destinations	Notes
	0.000	0.000	SR-83 – Corinne, Howell	Western terminus
Bothwell Junction	14.114– 14.316	22.714– 23.039	I-84 to I-15 – Brigham City, Boise	West end of I-84 Bus. concurrency; I-84 exit 40;
Tremonton	14.891– 14.910	23.965– 23.995	Bridge under I-15	
Tremonton	15.497	24.940	I-15 BL north (Iowa String Road, 1000 West)	West end of I-15 Bus. concurrency
Tremonton	16.267	26.179	Tremont Street	Former SR-82
Tremonton	16.492	26.541	SR-82 (300 East) – Garland	
Tremonton	17.499	28.162	SR-13 (5200 West) / I-15 BL south / I-84 BL east	Haws Corner Junction; east end of I-15 Bus. and I-84 Bus. concurrencies
Deweyville	20.072	32.303	SR-38	Eastern terminus
1.000 mi = 1.609 km; 1.000 km = 0.621 mi: Concurrency terminus
