= Utah State Route 42 =

State highway in Utah, United States

State Route 42

Route information
- Maintained by UDOT
- Length: 7.390 mi (11.893 km)
- Existed: 1912 as a state highway; 1927 as SR-42–present

Major junctions
- West end: Idaho state line near Malta, ID
- East end: SR-30 Curlew Junction

Location
- Country: United States
- State: Utah

Highway system
- Utah State Highway System; Interstate; US; State; Minor; Scenic
← US 40	→ SR-43

State Route 42 (SR-42) is a 7.390-mile-long (11.893 km) state highway completely within Box Elder County in the U.S. state of Utah. It connects SR-30 to former SH-81 at the Idaho state line. The highway was formerly part of U.S. Route 30S (US-30S), prior to being bypassed and replaced with what is now signed as Interstate 84 (I-84).

== Route description ==
State Route 42 begins at the Idaho state line, connecting to Malta, Idaho via a Cassia County road. From its western terminus, SR-42 travels southeast through Kelton Pass, a gap between the Raft River Mountains to the southwest and the Black Pine Mountains to the northeast. The highway eventually reaches the ghost town of Cedar Creek, where it turns to the east-southeast. It continues in this manner until its eastern terminus at SR-30, known as Curlew Junction.

== History ==
The road from SR-17 (now SR-82) in Tremonton northwest to Snowville became a state highway in 1912 as part of the Midland Trail (which continued to Nevada via present SR-30. The state highway was extended to Idaho in 1921, became part of US 30S in 1926, and received the (unsigned) SR-42 designation in 1927. The route was extended slightly east from Tremonton to SR-41 (now SR-13) in 1945, taking over what had been part of SR-82. When SR-3 was assigned to proposed I-80N in 1962, SR-42 east of the Snowville junction (exit 7) became SR-3. (Later, the portion near Tremonton would be renumbered SR-102.) Finally, in 1969, SR-42 received its present termini, as SR-70 (now SR-30) was extended east over SR-42 to I-84 west of Snowville, and the roadway through Snowville was removed from the state highway system. The American Association of State Highway Officials approved the relocation of US-30S onto I-84 in 1970, after which the first SR-42 signs were placed on the route that had been so designated since 1927.

== Major intersections ==
The entire route is in Box Elder County.

Location	mi	km	Destinations	Notes
	0.000	0.000	SH-81 – Malta, Burley	Utah/Idaho state line; western terminus
Curlew Junction	7.390	11.893	SR-30 – Park Valley, Snowville	Eastern terminus
1.000 mi = 1.609 km; 1.000 km = 0.621 mi
