= The Island (Cache County, Utah) =

Island in Utah, United States

Coordinates: 41°48′44″N 111°56′14″W

The Island is an island in the Bear River, at the head of Cutler Reservoir, near Cache Junction in Cache County, Utah. Before the reservoir was built, there was no island but an oxbow lake at the location. The Island is owned by PacifiCorp.
