= Ellwyn R. Stoddard =

American sociologist (1927–2023)

Ellwyn Reed Stoddard (February 16, 1927 – July 30, 2023) was an American sociologist. He was Professor Emeritus of Sociology and Anthropology at the University of Texas at El Paso where he began teaching in 1965.

== Biography ==
Ellwyn Reed Stoddard was born in Garland, Utah on February 16, 1927.

Stoddard was an expert on Mexican borderlands culture. He wrote the Borderlands Sourcebook, Mexican Americans, Maquila: Assembly Plants in Northern Mexico as well as about 100 articles, chapters or books largely relating to Borderlands Culture. Among other things, Stoddard argued Maquilas are safer and give better benefits than other factories in the region.

Stoddard was the founder of the Association for Borderlands Studies, and served as its president from 1976 to 1979. He has been included in Who's Who in America

Stoddard was a member of the Church of Jesus Christ of Latter-day Saints. He died on July 30, 2023, at the age of 96.

== Sources ==
- UTEP bio of Stoddard
- library thing listing
- Open Library listing for Stoddard
- Conrey Bryson. "Saints at the Pass" in Ensign, Dec. 1991.
