= Collinston, Utah =

Unincorporated community in the state of Utah, United States

- Unincorporated community
- Location of Colliston within the State of Utah Collinston (the United States)
- Coordinates: 41°46′29″N 112°5′42″W
- Country: United States
- State: Utah
- County: Box Elder
- Settled: 1860
- Named after: Collins Fulmer
- Elevation: 4,432 ft (1,351 m)
- Time zone: UTC-7 (Mountain (MST))
  - Summer (DST): UTC-6 (MDT)
- ZIP codes: 84306
- GNIS feature ID: 1428419

Collinston is an unincorporated community on the northeastern edge of Box Elder County, Utah, United States.

== Description ==
Historical population
Census	Pop.	Note	%±
1890	798		—
1900	340		−57.4%
1910	114		−66.5%
1920	155		36.0%
1930	132		−14.8%
1940	114		−13.6%
1950	145		27.2%
Source: U.S. Census Bureau

Mainly an agricultural community, the town is located 3 miles (4.8 km) southeast of Fielding and almost directly west of Riverside, at coordinates 41°46′29″N 112°5′42″W (441.7746496, -112.0949517). Its elevation is 4,432 feet (1,351 m). It has a post office with the ZIP code 84306.

Collinston is mentioned as the approximate location where Captain John C. Frémont crossed the Bear River in 1843.

The town was originally known as Hampton or Hampton Ford. It was named for Ben Hampton, who, with William Godbe, operated a toll ferry across the Bear River from 1867 to 1868. James Standing later bought the ferry and bridge rights and moved the town to higher ground 1 mile (1.6 km) east. The name was changed to Collinston, after Utah Northern Railroad conductor Collins Fulmer.
