= Utah State Route 82 =

State highway in Utah, United States

State Route 82
- SR-82 highlighted in red

Route information
- Maintained by UDOT
- Length: 3.178 mi (5.114 km)
- Existed: 1935–present

Major junctions
- South end: SR-102 in Tremonton
- North end: SR-13 near Garland

Location
- Country: United States
- State: Utah

Highway system
- Utah State Highway System; Interstate; US; State; Minor; Scenic
← SR-81	→ SR-83

State Route 82 (SR-82) is a state highway in the U.S. state of Utah. It is a short connector road, only 3.178 miles (5.114 km) long, that connects the towns of Tremonton and Garland in Box Elder County.

== Route description ==
State Route 82 starts at SR-102 (Main Street) in Tremonton and travels north as 300 East. As it leaves Tremonton and enters the town of Garland it becomes Main Street and continues north into the center of town. At the two-mile point, the route intersects Factory Street (the central east–west road in Garland) and turns east onto the street. From here the route continues east for 0.73 miles (1.17 km) out of Garland, then turns north onto 5400 West for less than half a mile before ending at its intersection with SR-13.

== History ==
The road from SR-1 (US-91, now SR-90) in Brigham City north to the Idaho state line became a state highway in 1910. It was initially assigned the SR-17 designation in the 1920s, but in 1927 the state legislature changed the designation to SR-41 (now SR-13). The portion south of SR-42 (now SR-102) in Tremonton became part of U.S. Route 30S in 1926, and the entire route became Utah's portion of a southern extension of U.S. Route 191 in the late 1930s. A new alignment around Tremonton and Garland was defined in 1935, with the old route becoming State Route 82.

The southern half-mile of the route was originally located three blocks to the west of the modern route, along Tremont Street, going north to 600 North, then east to 300 East. In 1955, the segment of 300 East between Main Street and 600 North was added to the state highway system as State Route 82A. SR-82A was decommissioned in 1964, but SR-82 was rerouted to what had been SR-82A for safety and economic reasons; the original route on Tremont Street and 600 North was transferred to local jurisdiction at that time.

On May 20, 1977, State Route 82 was renumbered as State Route 126. This was because the legislature redesignated SR-82 as the legislative designation for what was then I-80N. This renumbering was only temporary, however, as on August 26 that same year, I-80N was renumbered to what is now I-84, releasing SR-82 back to its original route. At the same time, SR-84 was designated as I-84, and the former SR-84 was renumbered to the newly vacated SR-126.

== Major intersections ==
The entire route is in Box Elder County.

Location	mi	km	Destinations	Notes
Tremonton	0.000	0.000	SR-102 (Main Street)	Southern terminus
	3.178	5.114	SR-13	Northern terminus
1.000 mi = 1.609 km; 1.000 km = 0.621 mi
