= Cutler Reservoir =

Reservoir in Utah, United States

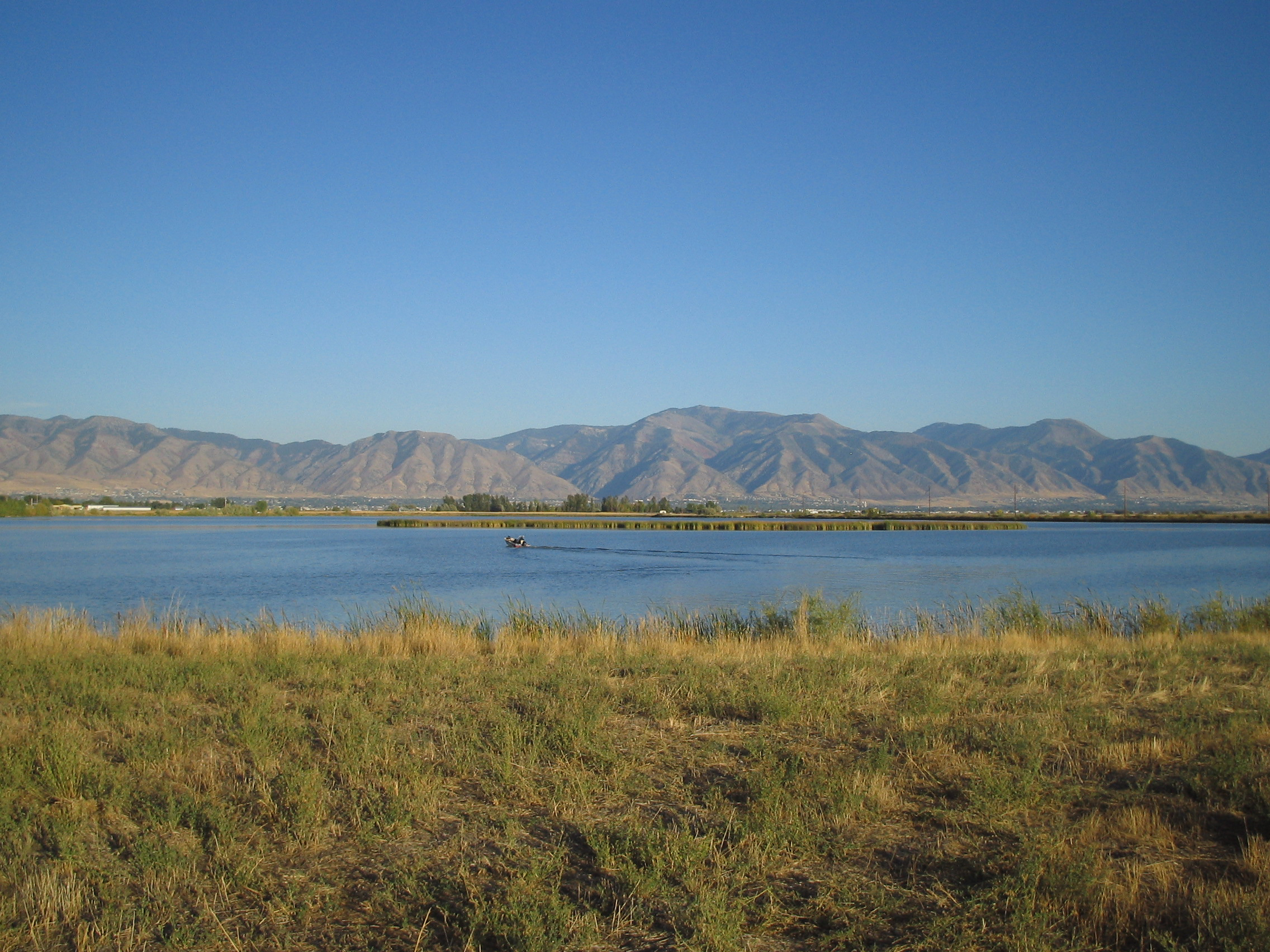

- Location within Utah Location within the United States
- Location: Cache Valley, Cache / Box Elder counties, Utah, US
- Coordinates: 41°50′12″N 112°02′51″W
- Type: reservoir
- Primary inflows: Bear River
- Primary outflows: Bear River
- Basin countries: United States
- Surface elevation: 4,409 feet (1,344 m)

Cutler Reservoir is a reservoir located in Cache Valley in the U.S. state of Utah. It is an impoundment on the Bear River primarily used for hydroelectric power generation. The Cutler Hydroelectric Plant is capable of generating 30MW of renewable energy. It also serves irrigation, flood control, and water supply.

The concrete gravity-arch Cutler Dam, built in 1927, is located in easternmost Box Elder County, although the reservoir is almost entirely in Cache County, to its east. Cutler contains several fish species, including catfish, walleye, and bass. The reservoir and adjacent swamps are listed as an important bird area by the National Audubon Society; species include hawks, falcons, eagles and osprey; pelicans, great blue heron and ibis; multiple species of owl; ducks, geese and swans; and others.

The Island is in Cutler Reservoir.

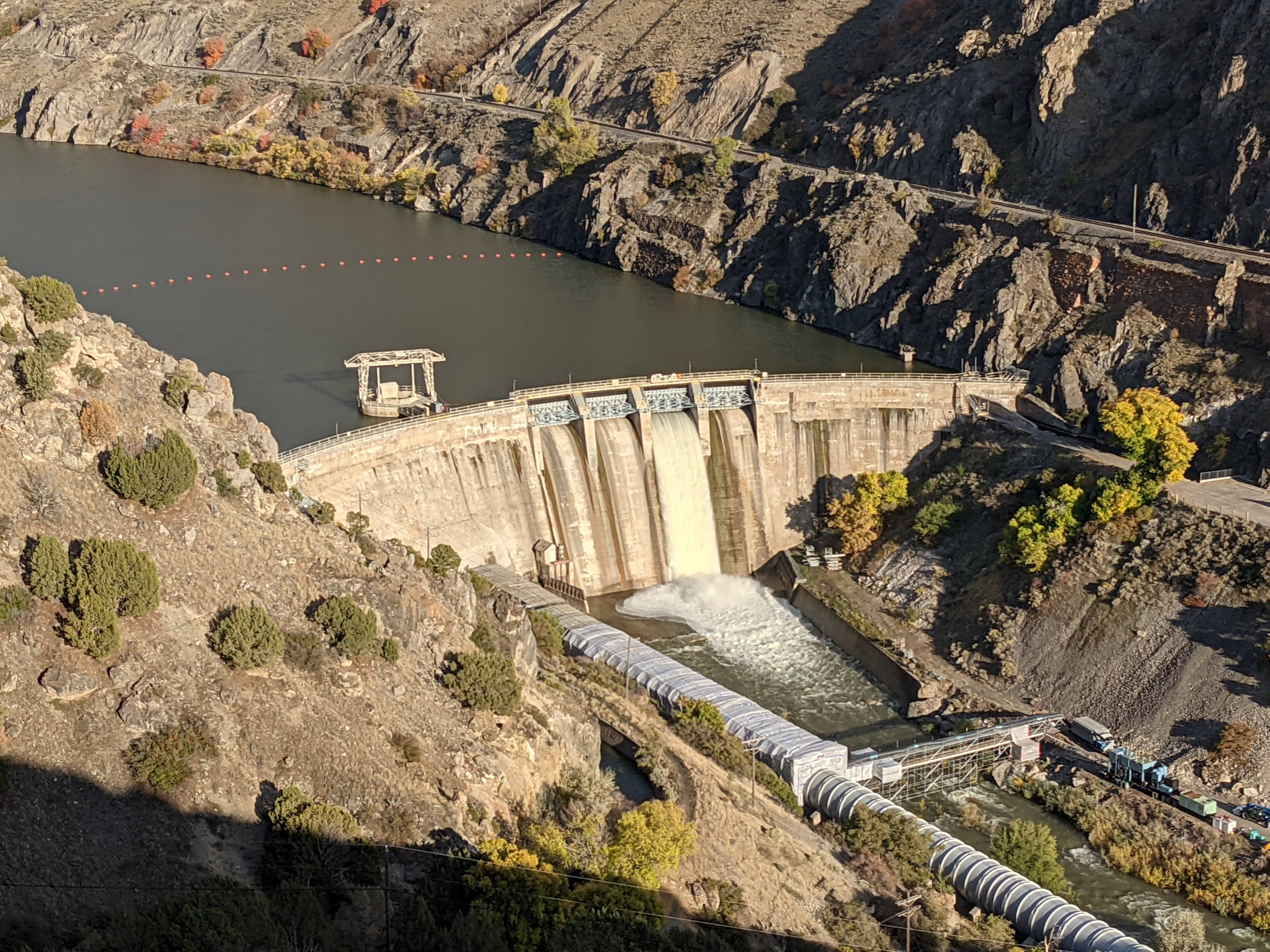
Cutler Dam undergoing restoration in 2021.
