= Utah State Route 81 =

State highway in Utah, United States

State Route 81

Route information
- Maintained by UDOT
- Length: 2.475 mi (3.983 km)
- Existed: 1935–present

Major junctions
- South end: SR-30 in Box Elder County
- North end: Main Street in Fielding

Location
- Country: United States
- State: Utah

Highway system
- Utah State Highway System; Interstate; US; State; Minor; Scenic
← I-80	→ SR-82

State Route 81 is a state highway in the U.S. state of Utah. It is a short connector road, only 2.475 miles (3.983 km) long, that connects SR-30 with the town of Fielding in Box Elder County.

== Route description ==
The route starts at its intersection with SR-30 south of Fielding in Box Elder County, Utah. It starts out travelling west, then meanders northwest for approximately 1 mile (1.6 km) before turning north as 4000 West and continuing until its terminus at Main Street in the center of Fielding.

== History ==
The route was established in 1935 by the Utah state legislature from US-91/SR-1 east to Fielding and south to SR-154. In 1969, the section from US-91 east to Fielding was cancelled, and SR-82 replaced the section of SR-154 at the south end. There have been no changes since.

== Major intersections ==
The entire route is in Box Elder County.

Location	mi	km	Destinations	Notes
	0.000	0.000	SR-30	Southern terminus
Fielding	2.475	3.983	Main Street	Northern terminus
1.000 mi = 1.609 km; 1.000 km = 0.621 mi
