= Elwood, Utah =

Town in the state of Utah, United States

- Town
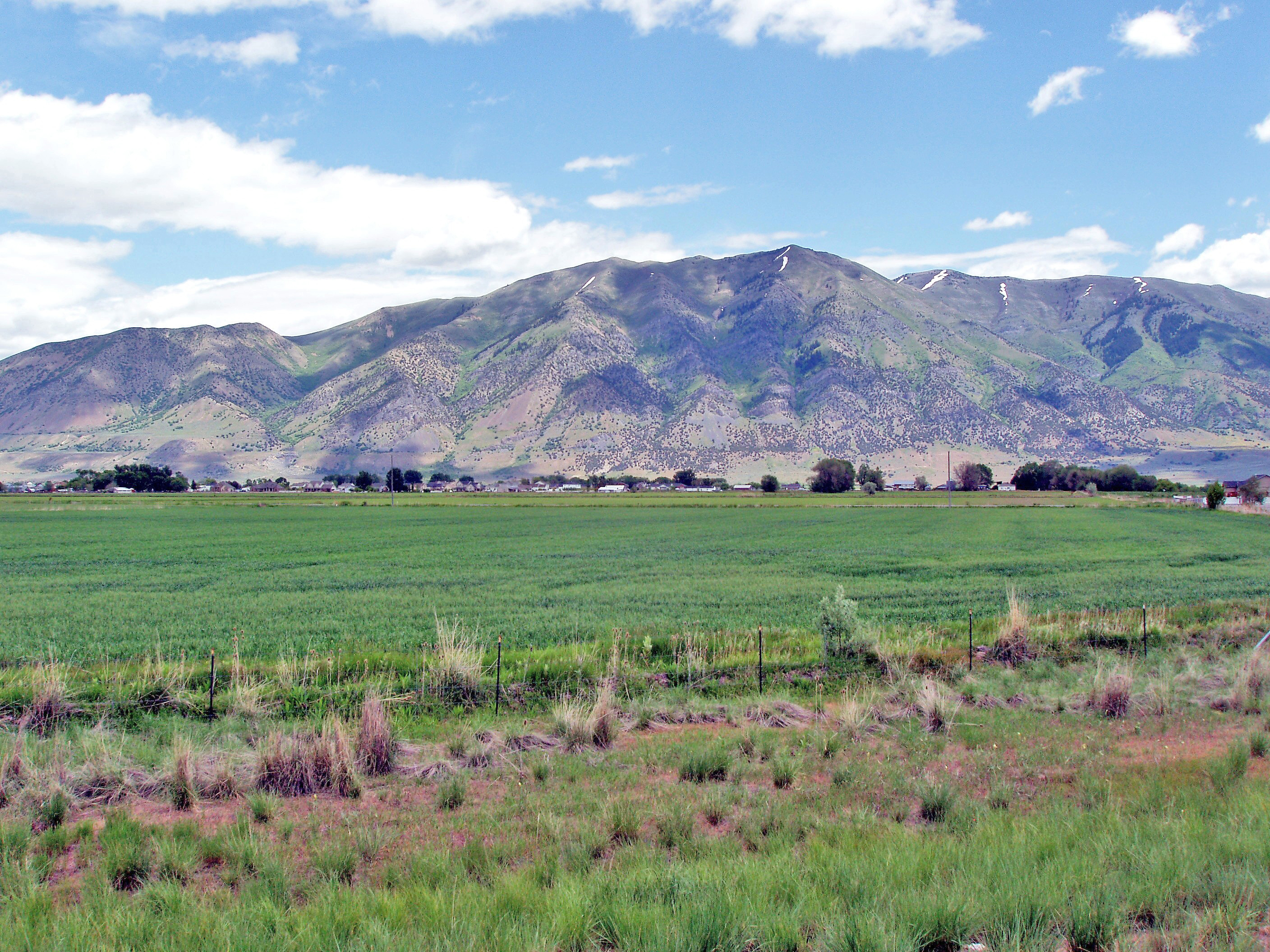
- Town of Elwood, with Mendon Peak in background

- Location in Box Elder County and the state of Utah

- Location of Utah in the United States
- Coordinates: 41°40′43″N 112°07′54″W
- Country: United States
- State: Utah
- County: Box Elder
- Settled: 1868
- Incorporated: 1933

Area
  - Total: 8.07 sq mi (20.91 km^{2})
  - Land: 8.06 sq mi (20.88 km^{2})
  - Water: 0.015 sq mi (0.04 km^{2})
- Elevation: 4,285 ft (1,306 m)

Population (2020)
  - Total: 1,173
  - Density: 145.5/sq mi (56.18/km^{2})
- Time zone: UTC-7 (Mountain (MST))
  - Summer (DST): UTC-6 (MDT)
- ZIP code: 84337
- Area code: 435
- FIPS code: 49-22760
- GNIS feature ID: 2412482
- Website: elwoodtown.gov

Elwood is a town in Box Elder County, Utah, United States. The population was 1,173 at the 2020 census, up from the 2010 figure of 1,034.

== Geography ==
Elwood is located in eastern Box Elder County in the Bear River Valley. The Bear River forms part of the eastern border of the town, and the Malad River forms part of the western border. The town of Deweyville and the city of Honeyville are to the east, and the city of Tremonton is to the northwest.

Interstate Highways 15 and 84 run through the town, with access from Exit 376 (Utah State Route 13, the main local road through the town).

According to the United States Census Bureau, the town has a total area of 7.8 square miles (20.3 km^{2}), of which 0.02 square miles (0.04 km^{2}), or 0.17%, is water.

== Demographics ==
Historical population
| Census | Pop. | Note | %± |
|---|---|---|---|
| 1910 | 525 | | — |
| 1920 | 648 | | 23.4% |
| 1930 | 520 | | −19.8% |
| 1940 | 469 | | −9.8% |
| 1950 | 393 | | −16.2% |
| 1960 | 345 | | −12.2% |
| 1970 | 294 | | −14.8% |
| 1980 | 481 | | 63.6% |
| 1990 | 575 | | 19.5% |
| 2000 | 678 | | 17.9% |
| 2010 | 1,034 | | 52.5% |
| 2020 | 1,173 | | 13.4% |
U.S. Decennial Census

As of the census of 2000, there were 678 people, 194 households, and 170 families residing in the town. The population density was 88.5 people per square mile (34.2/km^{2}). There were 198 housing units at an average density of 25.8 per square mile (10.0/km^{2}). The racial makeup of the town was 93.95% White, 0.44% Native American, 1.33% Asian, 3.10% from other races, and 1.18% from two or more races. Hispanic or Latino of any race were 4.28% of the population.

There were 194 households, out of which 47.4% had children under 18 living with them, 76.3% were married couples living together, 5.2% had a female householder with no husband present, and 11.9% were non-families. 11.9% of all households were made up of individuals, and 6.7% had someone living alone who was 65 years of age or older. The average household size was 3.49, and the average family size was 3.79.

In the town, the population was spread out, with 37.9% under 18, 8.6% from 18 to 24, 24.0% from 25 to 44, 20.6% from 45 to 64, and 8.8% who were 65 years of age or older. The median age was 29 years. For every 100 females, there were 109.3 males. For every 100 females aged 18 and over, there were 110.5 males.

The median income for a household in the town was $46,406, and the median income for a family was $52,292. Males had a median income of $37,500 versus $21,875 for females. The per capita income for the town was $15,233. About 3.4% of families and 4.3% of the population were below the poverty line, including 4.2% of those under age 18 and 7.4% of those aged 65 or over.
