= Utah State Route 90 =

State highway in Utah, United States

State Route 90
- 200 South

Route information
- Maintained by UDOT
- Length: 1.178 mi (1.896 km)
- Existed: 1975–present

Major junctions
- West end: SR-13 in Brigham City
- East end: US 89 / US 91 in Brigham City

Location
- Country: United States
- State: Utah

Highway system
- Utah State Highway System; Interstate; US; State; Minor; Scenic
← US 89A	→ US 91

State Route 90 (SR-90) is a state highway in the U.S. state of Utah that sits completely within Brigham City in Box Elder County. The route travels from its western terminus at SR-13 to its eastern terminus at the junction of US-89/US-91.

SR-90 was the old routing of US-89/US-91 through the city before it was re-routed to a path bypassing the town.

== Route description ==
SR-90 begins in the center of Brigham City and heads east through the east-central portion of the town. After continuing east for six blocks, the highway veers to the southeast to meet with US-89/US-91 at the mouth of Brigham Canyon, where SR-90 traffic is diverted to US-89/US-91 northbound through a flyover ramp.

== History ==
200 South in Brigham City was added to the state highway system in 1910, and in the 1920s it became part of SR-1 (US-91). A proposed connection from proposed I-15 southwest of Brigham City east and northeast to SR-1 east of Brigham City was numbered State Route 85 in 1960, and in 1962, when SR-1 was moved to I-15, SR-85 was extended along former SR-1 to Idaho. 200 South, which was bypassed by the construction of SR-85 in about 1971, remained as a spur of SR-85 until 1975, when it was renumbered SR-90.

== Major intersections ==
The entire route is in Brigham City, Box Elder County.

mi	km	Destinations	Notes
0.000	0.000	SR-13 (Main Street)	Western terminus
1.178	1.896	US 89 / US 91 – Logan	Interchange; Northbound entrance, southbound exit Eastern terminus
1.000 mi = 1.609 km; 1.000 km = 0.621 mi: Incomplete access
