= Corinne, Utah =

City in Utah, United States

- City
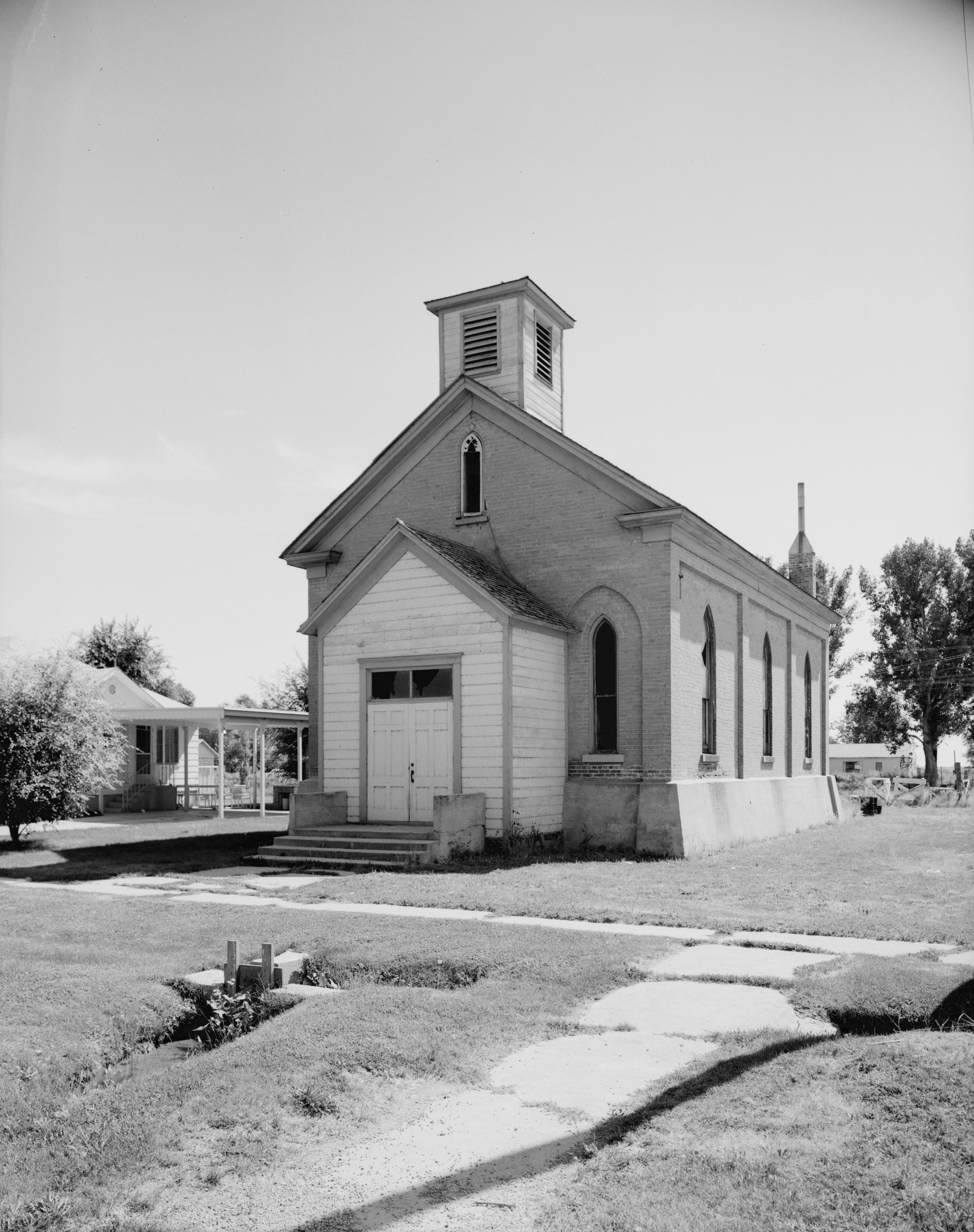
- Corinne Methodist Episcopal Church
- Nickname: "Gateway to the Golden Spike"
- Location in Box Elder County and the state of Utah

- Location of Utah in the United States
- Coordinates: 41°33′02″N 112°07′41″W
- Country: United States
- State: Utah
- County: Box Elder
- Founded: 1869
- Incorporated: February 18, 1870
- Founder: Mark A. Gilmore
- Named for: Corinne Williamson

Area
  - Total: 3.84 sq mi (9.95 km^{2})
  - Land: 3.78 sq mi (9.79 km^{2})
  - Water: 0.062 sq mi (0.16 km^{2})
- Elevation: 4,236 ft (1,291 m)

Population (2020)
  - Total: 809
  - Density: 214/sq mi (82.6/km^{2})
- Time zone: UTC-7 (MST)
  - Summer (DST): UTC-6 (MDT)
- ZIP code: 84307
- Area code: 435
- FIPS code: 49-15830
- GNIS feature ID: 2410228
- Website: www.corinnecity.gov

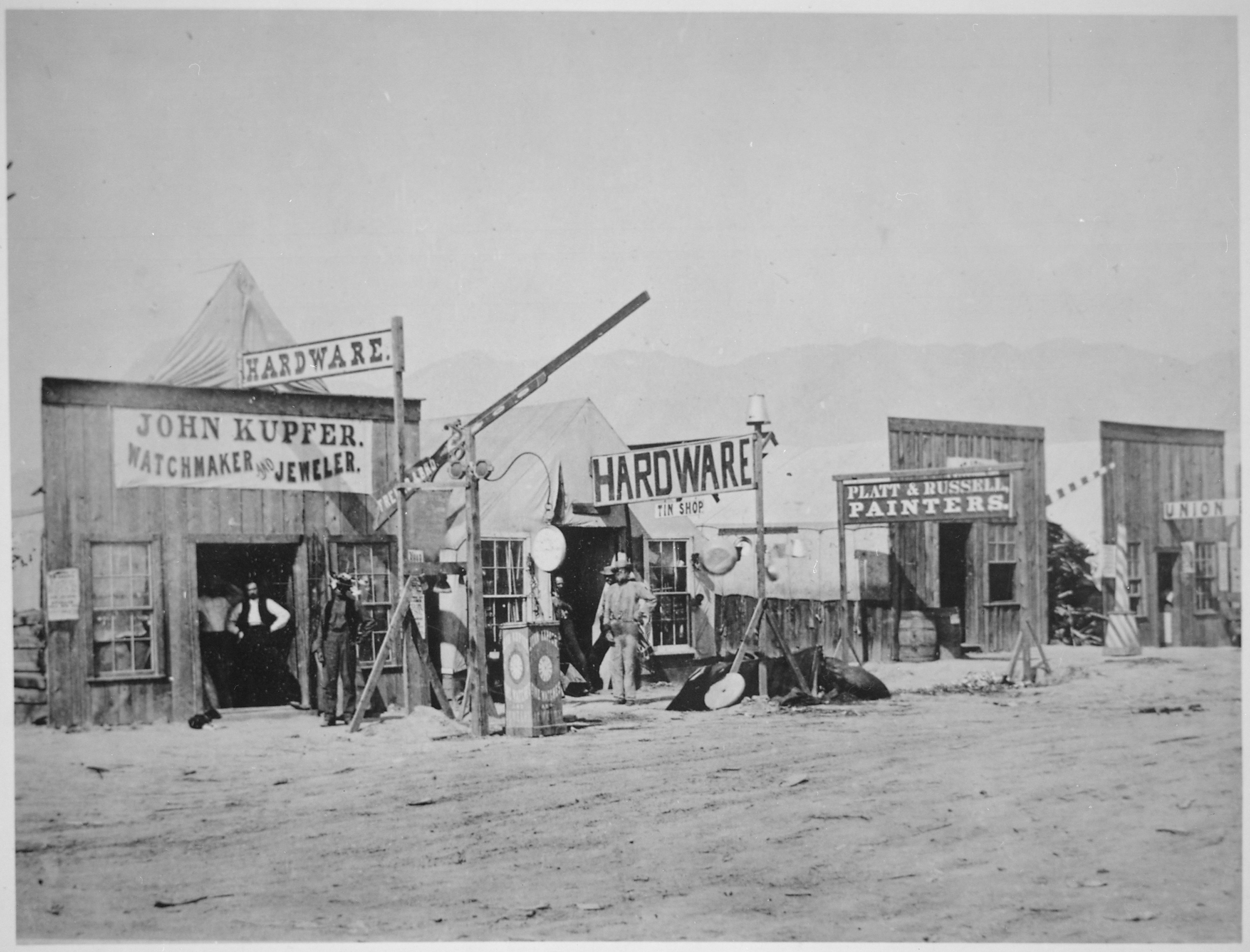
Street view in Corinne, Box Elder County, Utah. Close-up view of several shops, 1869.

Corinne (/kəˈrɪn/ kə-RIN) is a city in Box Elder County, Utah, United States. The population was 809 at the 2020 census, up from the 2010 figure of 685.

== History ==
For almost ten years from its founding on 25 March 1869, the town of Corinne prospered as the unofficial "Gentile Capital of Utah". As the Union Pacific and Central Pacific railroads approached their historic meeting place at Promontory Summit early in 1869, a group of former Union Army officers and some determined non-Mormon merchants from Salt Lake City decided to locate a Gentile town on the Union Pacific line, believing that the town could compete economically and politically with the Saints of Utah. They chose a location about six miles west of Brigham City on the west bank of the Bear River where the railroad crossed that stream. Named by one of the founders (General J. A. Williamson) for his fourteen-year-old daughter, Corinne was designed to be the freight-transfer point for the shipment of goods and supplies to the mining towns of western Montana along the Montana Trail.

Corinne differed from most pioneer communities in Utah because it was settled by people of different religions and even those who professed no religious affiliation. In its heyday, Corinne had some 1,000 permanent residents, not one of whom was a member of the Church of Jesus Christ of Latter-day Saints, according to the boast of the local newspaper. As an end-of-the-trail town, Corinne reflected a very different atmosphere and culture from the staid and quiet Mormon settlements of Utah, containing not only supply houses but also fifteen saloons and sixteen liquor stores, with an elected town marshal to keep order in this "Dodge City" of Utah. The permanent residents of Corinne did their best to promote a sense of community pride and peaceful cultural pursuits but had a raucous and independent clientele of freighters and stagecoach drivers to control.

With some support from political leaders in the nation's capital and eastern newspapers, the town fathers attempted to use their position as a Gentile city to break the political and economic monopoly held by the Mormons in Utah Territory. They sought to have J. A. Williamson named territorial governor, tried to have the northern one degree of latitude of Utah added to Idaho to dismember the territory, and attempted to have Corinne named as the capital of Utah. The citizens of Corinne failed in each case to achieve their wishes, although their leaders and newspapers bombarded Washington, D.C., for help in their fight with Brigham Young and the Mormon hierarchy.

The first meeting in Corinne in 1872, Corinne Lodge No.5, was chartered as first Utah Masonic Lodge north of Salt Lake City on 11 November 1873 by the Grand Lodge of Free and Accepted Masons of Utah. Edmond P. Johnson, the first Master of the Lodge and a past jurisdictional judge in Box Elder County, along with many other prominent Masons of the day, are buried in the Corinne City Cemetery.

Brigham Young assured the demise of Corinne when he and the Mormon people built the narrow-gauge Utah Northern Railroad from Ogden to Franklin, Idaho. Although construction of the line beyond that point ceased for four years as a result of the Panic of 1873, in the autumn of 1877, the Union Pacific bought the spur line and began pushing it northward through Idaho. The tracks reached Marsh Valley and cut the Montana Trail at that place, thereby supplanting wagon traffic from Corinne with rail transport from Ogden. The Gentile merchants soon abandoned Corinne in favor of Ogden or the terminus of the rail line, while Mormon farmers moved in to buy the land around Corinne and make it into another Mormon settlement.

In 1877 an LDS ward was organized but was dissolved when the town suffered a decline in population. As farmers again settled the region, a Corinne Ward was again organized; during the interim, it was part of the Bear River Ward. A meetinghouse was built in 1914, and the Corinne Ward was reorganized that year with Alma Jensen as Bishop.

== Geography ==
Corinne is located in southeastern Box Elder County, on the west side of the Bear River. It is the last town on the river before it enters the marsh complexes leading to the Great Salt Lake. Brigham City is 6 miles (9.7 km) to the southeast, and Bear River City is 5 miles (8 km) to the north.

According to the United States Census Bureau, the city has a total area of 3.9 square miles (10.1 km^{2}), of which 3.8 square miles (9.9 km^{2}) is land and 0.08 square miles (0.2 km^{2}), or 1.53%, is water.

== Demographics ==
Historical population
Census	Pop.	Note	%±
1900	323		—
1910	231		−28.5%
1920	394		70.6%
1930	352		−10.7%
1940	411		16.8%
1950	427		3.9%
1960	510		19.4%
1970	471		−7.6%
1980	512		8.7%
1990	639		24.8%
2000	621		−2.8%
2010	685		10.3%
2020	809		18.1%
U.S. Decennial Census

=== 2020 census ===
As of the 2020 census, Corinne had a population of 809, the median age was 34.8 years, 28.1% of residents were under 18, and 13.8% were 65 years of age or older. For every 100 females there were 103.3 males, and for every 100 females age 18 and over there were 100.0 males age 18 and over.

0.0% of residents lived in urban areas, while 100.0% lived in rural areas.

There were 281 households in Corinne, of which 41.3% had children under the age of 18 living in them. Of all households, 59.1% were married-couple households, 16.7% were households with a male householder and no spouse or partner present, and 19.9% were households with a female householder and no spouse or partner present. About 19.9% of all households were made up of individuals and 10.7% had someone living alone who was 65 years of age or older.

There were 288 housing units, of which 2.4% were vacant. The homeowner vacancy rate was 0.0% and the rental vacancy rate was 2.3%.

Racial composition as of the 2020 census
Race	Number	Percent
White	692	85.5%
Black or African American	1	0.1%
American Indian and Alaska Native	6	0.7%
Asian	10	1.2%
Native Hawaiian and Other Pacific Islander	7	0.9%
Some other race	55	6.8%
Two or more races	38	4.7%
Hispanic or Latino (of any race)	106	13.1%

=== 2000 census ===
As of the census of 2000, there were 621 people, 190 households, and 159 families residing in the city. The population density was 173.4 people per square mile (67.0/km^{2}). There were 208 housing units at an average density of 58.1 per square mile (22.4/km^{2}). The racial makeup of the city was 89.86% White, 0.48% Native American, 2.42% Asian, 0.32% Pacific Islander, 5.96% from other races, and 0.97% from two or more races. Hispanic or Latino of any race were 8.21% of the population.

There were 190 households, of which 46.3% had children under 18 living with them, 72.6% were married couples living together, 6.3% had a female householder with no husband present, and 16.3% were non-families. 15.8% of all households were made up of individuals, and 7.4% had someone living alone who was 65 years of age or older. The average household size was 3.27, and the average family size was 3.64.

The 2000 population distribution was 34.3% under 18, 10.3% from 18 to 24, 26.2% from 25 to 44, 19.8% from 45 to 64, and 9.3% of 65 or more years of age. The median age was 31 years. For every 100 females, there were 101.6 males. For every 100 females aged 18 and over, there were 104.0 males.

The median income for a household in the city was $42,125, and the median income for a family was $45,208. Males had a median income of $32,344 versus $19,205 for females. The per capita income for the city was $16,053. About 6.2% of families and 8.5% of the population were below the poverty line, including 10.9% of those under age 18 and 12.9% of those aged 65 or over.

== Schools ==
For several years an elementary school operated in Corinne, but it was closed, and its students merged with Century Elementary School in Bear River City.

== See also ==
- List of cities and towns in Utah
