= Garland, Utah =

City in Utah, United States

- City
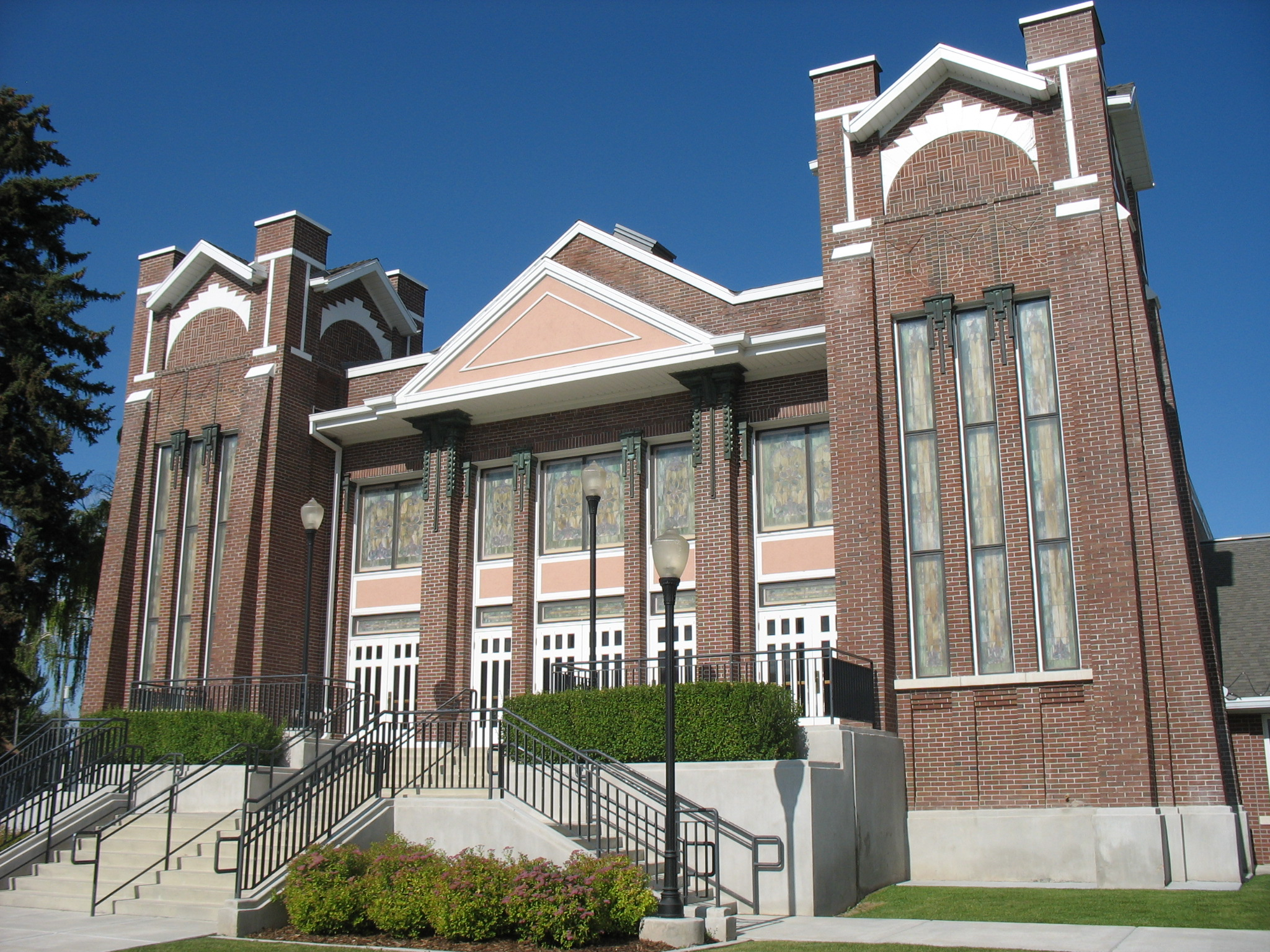
- The Garland Tabernacle, an early Latter-day Saint meetinghouse
- Motto: "A Family Community"
- Location in Box Elder County and the state of Utah

- Location of Utah in the United States
- Coordinates: 41°44′10″N 112°09′46″W
- Country: United States
- State: Utah
- County: Box Elder
- Settled: 1890
- Named for: William Garland

Area
  - Total: 1.81 sq mi (4.69 km^{2})
  - Land: 1.81 sq mi (4.69 km^{2})
  - Water: 0 sq mi (0.00 km^{2})
- Elevation: 4,341 ft (1,323 m)

Population (2020)
  - Total: 2,589
  - Density: 1,430/sq mi (552/km^{2})
- Time zone: UTC-7 (MST)
  - Summer (DST): UTC-6 (MDT)
- ZIP code: 84312
- Area code: 435
- FIPS code: 49-28150
- GNIS feature ID: 2410573
- Website: www.garlandutah.gov

Garland is a city in northeastern Box Elder County, Utah, United States. The population was 2,589 at the 2020 census.

== History ==
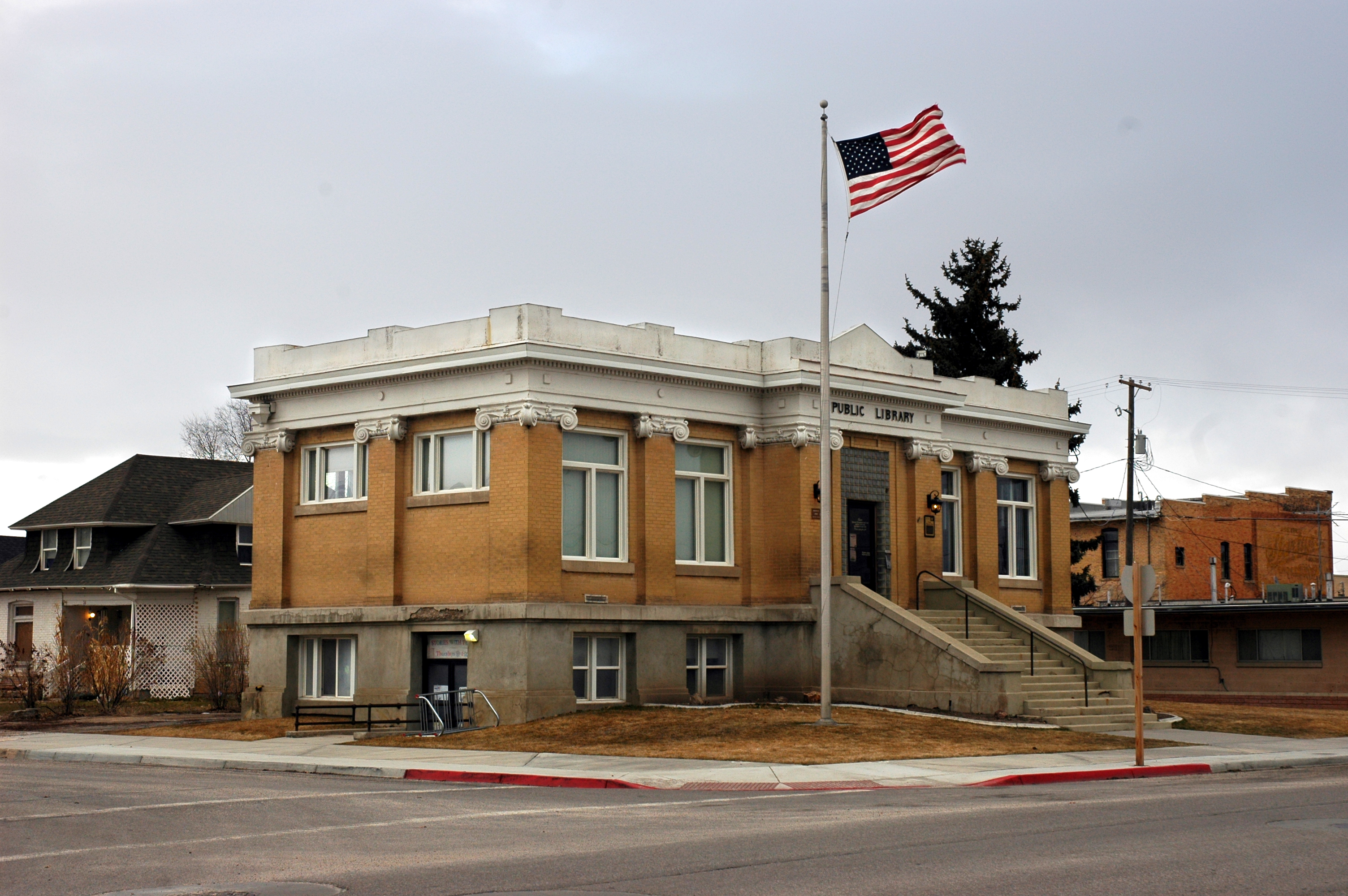
Carnegie Library in Garland, March 2010

Garland was originally named "Sunset" and settled in 1890. The first settler was David E. Manning.

It was a company town and was renamed after William Garland, the contractor who built the Utah Sugar Company factory at the location, completed in 1903. The company donated land to the LDS Church for a "ward chapel and amusement hall" and also built 14 homes, a hotel, and other buildings. The town had a general store, a bank, a post office, and a newspaper named The Garland Globe in 1906. By the 1920s there were other merchants, a flour mill, a Carnegie library, and a high school.

A Salt Lake Tribune article from June 1920 notes that Garland had a substantial population of Mexican Americans and Latino Mormons.

== Geography ==
Garland is located in eastern Box Elder County in the Bear River Valley. It is bordered by the city of Tremonton to the south. Interstate 15 passes to the west of Garland, with the closest access from Exit 381, 2.5 miles (4.0 km) southwest of the center of town.

According to the United States Census Bureau, the city has a total area of 1.81 square miles (4.7 km^{2}), all land.

== Demographics ==
Historical population
Census	Pop.	Note	%±
1910	600		—
1920	999		66.5%
1930	824		−17.5%
1940	926		12.4%
1950	1,008		8.9%
1960	1,119		11.0%
1970	1,187		6.1%
1980	1,405		18.4%
1990	1,637		16.5%
2000	1,943		18.7%
2010	2,400		23.5%
2020	2,589		7.9%
U.S. Decennial Census

=== 2020 census ===
As of the 2020 census, Garland had a population of 2,589. The median age was 28.9 years. 34.0% of residents were under the age of 18 and 10.6% of residents were 65 years of age or older. For every 100 females there were 107.3 males, and for every 100 females age 18 and over there were 103.1 males age 18 and over.

90.3% of residents lived in urban areas, while 9.7% lived in rural areas.

There were 818 households in Garland, of which 49.3% had children under the age of 18 living in them. Of all households, 61.9% were married-couple households, 15.0% were households with a male householder and no spouse or partner present, and 17.7% were households with a female householder and no spouse or partner present. About 16.4% of all households were made up of individuals and 8.2% had someone living alone who was 65 years of age or older.

There were 845 housing units, of which 3.2% were vacant. The homeowner vacancy rate was 0.8% and the rental vacancy rate was 2.5%.

Racial composition as of the 2020 census
Race	Number	Percent
White	2,232	86.2%
Black or African American	10	0.4%
American Indian and Alaska Native	23	0.9%
Asian	34	1.3%
Native Hawaiian and Other Pacific Islander	0	0.0%
Some other race	88	3.4%
Two or more races	202	7.8%
Hispanic or Latino (of any race)	303	11.7%

=== 2000 census ===
As of the 2000 census, there were 1,943 people, 588 households, and 476 families residing in the city. The population density was 1,097.8 people per square mile (423.8/km^{2}). There were 621 housing units at an average density of 350.9 per square mile (135.5/km^{2}). The racial makeup of the city was 88.99% White, 0.41% Native American, 3.14% Asian, 0.05% Pacific Islander, 5.46% from other races, and 1.96% from two or more races. Hispanic or Latino of any race were 7.87% of the population.

There were 588 households, out of which 51.5% had children under the age of 18 living with them, 69.2% were married couples living together, 7.8% had a female householder with no husband present, and 18.9% were non-families. 17.5% of all households were made up of individuals, and 8.5% had someone living alone who was 65 years of age or older. The average household size was 3.30, and the average family size was 3.74.

In the city, the population was spread out, with 39.6% under 18, 10.4% from 18 to 24, 27.3% from 25 to 44, 14.0% from 45 to 64, and 8.6% who were 65 years of age or older. The median age was 25 years. For every 100 females, there were 96.5 males. For every 100 females aged 18 and over, there were 95.2 males.

The median income for a household in the city was $38,679, and the median income for a family was $42,426. Males had a median income of $35,518 versus $22,237 for females. The per capita income was $13,408. About 5.7% of families and 6.9% of the population were below the poverty line, including 7.6% of those under age 18 and 4.9% of those age 65 or over.

== Education ==
Garland is part of the Box Elder School district and is home to Bear River High School along with other public schools.

== Notable people ==
- Gail Halvorsen (1920-2022), a senior officer in the United States Air Force during World War 2 and the Cold War. Commonly known as the “Berlin Candy Bomber.”
- Ellwyn R. Stoddard (1927-2023), Professor Emeritus of Sociology and Anthropology at the University of Texas at El Paso.

== See also ==
- List of cities and towns in Utah
