= Riverside, Utah =

- CDP
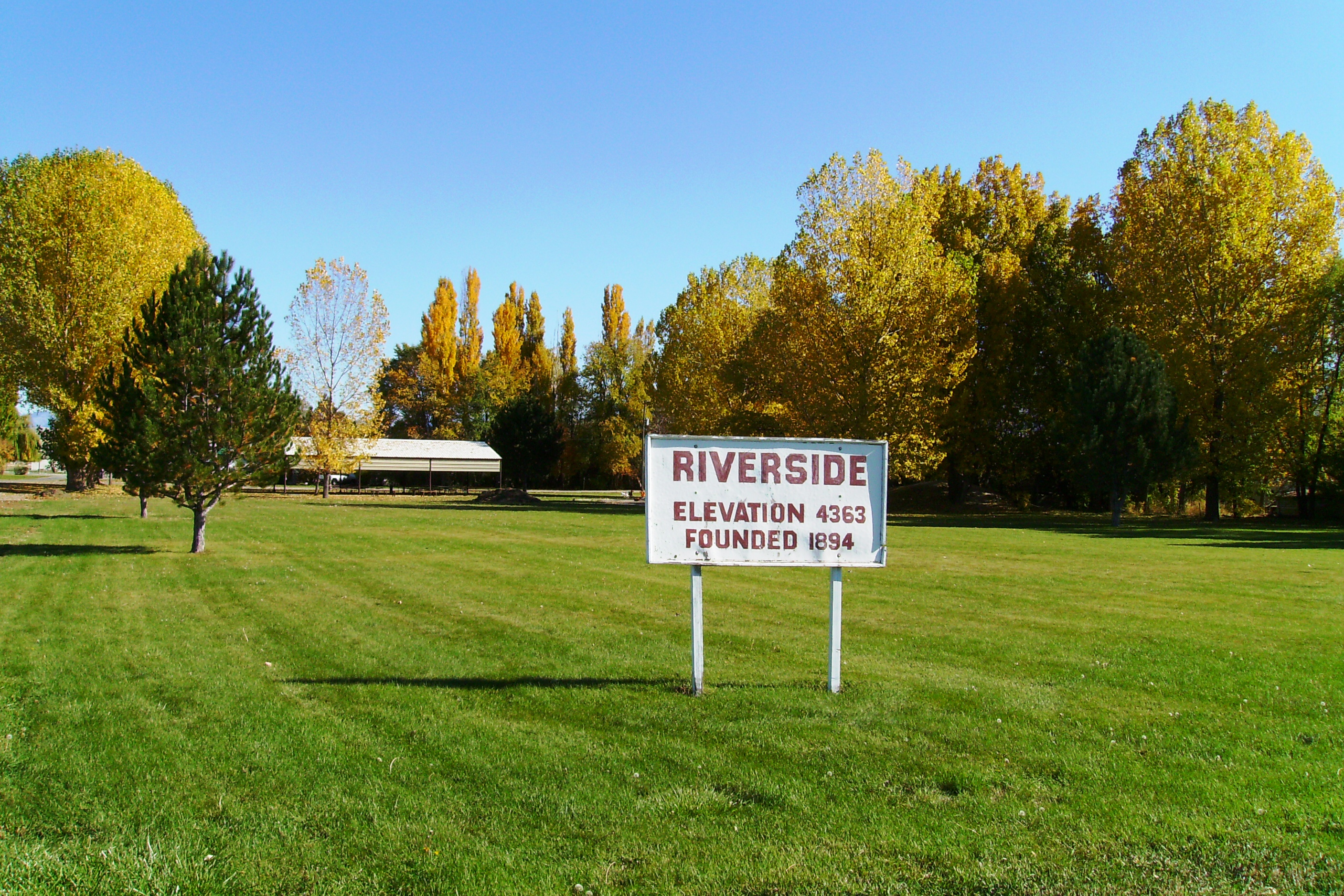

- Location in Box Elder County and the state of Utah.

- Location of Utah in the United States
- Coordinates: 41°48′19″N 112°07′55″W
- Country: United States
- State: Utah
- County: Box Elder
- Founded: 1894

Area
  - Total: 6.7 sq mi (17.4 km^{2})
  - Land: 6.7 sq mi (17.4 km^{2})
  - Water: 0 sq mi (0.0 km^{2})
- Elevation: 4,367 ft (1,331 m)

Population (2020)
  - Total: 971
  - Density: 145/sq mi (55.8/km^{2})
- Time zone: UTC-7 (Mountain (MST))
  - Summer (DST): UTC-6 (MDT)
- ZIP code: 84334
- Area code: 435
- FIPS code: 49-64230
- GNIS feature ID: 2409189

Riverside is a census-designated place (CDP) in Box Elder County, Utah, United States. The population was 971 at the 2020 census.

== Geography ==
According to the United States Census Bureau, the CDP has a total area of 6.7 square miles (17 km^{2}), all land.

== Demographics ==
Historical population
| Census | Pop. | Note | %± |
|---|---|---|---|
| 2000 | 678 | | — |
| 2010 | 760 | | 12.1% |
| 2020 | 971 | | 27.8% |

As of the census of 2000, there were 678 people, 196 households, and 167 families residing in the CDP. The population density was 100.7 people per square mile (38.9/km^{2}). There were 203 housing units at an average density of 30.1/sq mi (11.6/km^{2}). The racial makeup of the CDP was 95.43% White, 0.15% Native American, 2.06% Asian, 0.15% Pacific Islander, 0.44% from other races, and 1.77% from two or more races. Hispanic or Latino of any race were 2.21% of the population.

There were 196 households, out of which 51.0% had children under the age of 18 living with them, 79.1% were married couples living together, 4.1% had a female householder with no husband present, and 14.3% were non-families. 11.7% of all households were made up of individuals, and 8.2% had someone living alone who was 65 years of age or older. The average household size was 3.46 and the average family size was 3.80.

In the CDP, the population was spread out, with 38.9% under the age of 18, 9.6% from 18 to 24, 24.5% from 25 to 44, 16.8% from 45 to 64, and 10.2% who were 65 years of age or older. The median age was 27 years. For every 100 females, there were 103.0 males. For every 100 females age 18 and over, there were 98.1 males.

The median income for a household in the CDP was $46,875, and the median income for a family was $49,821. Males had a median income of $36,845 versus $24,417 for females. The per capita income for the CDP was $14,727. About 12.0% of families and 15.4% of the population were below the poverty line, including 23.7% of those under age 18 and 6.5% of those age 65 or over.

== See also ==
- List of census-designated places in Utah
