= Tremonton, Utah =

City in Utah, United States

- City
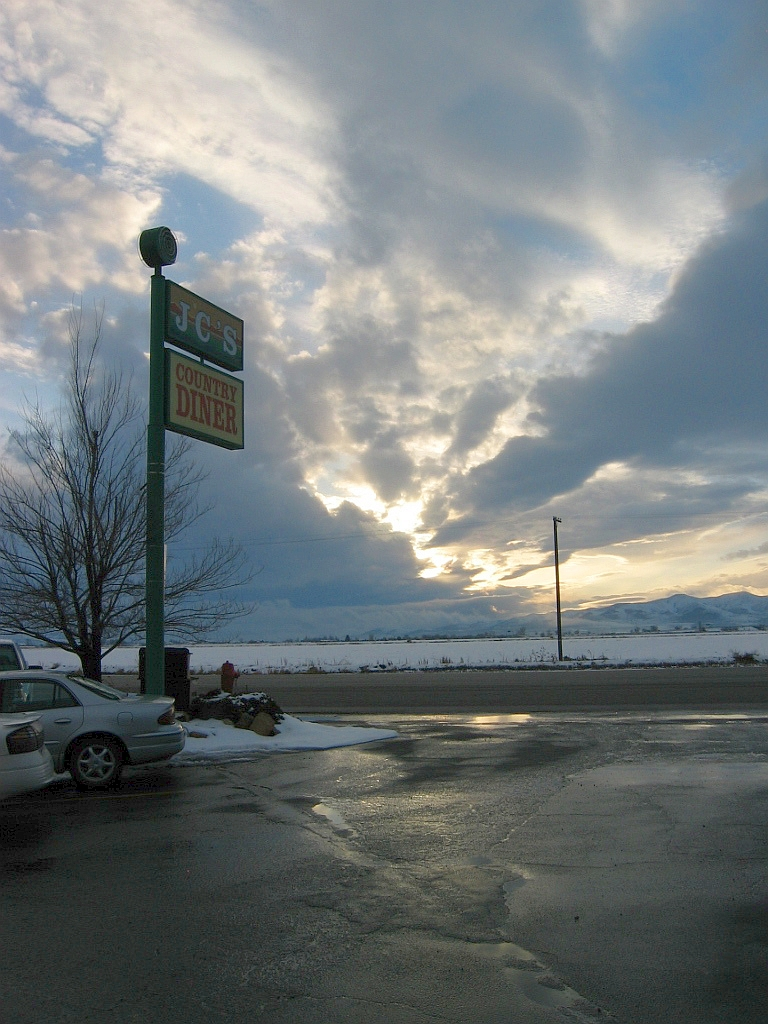
- Diner in the entrance of Tremonton at the junction of Interstate 15 and Interstate 84 in Utah
- Mottoes: "A friendly and progressive place" "City with a future"
- Location in Box Elder County and the state of Utah

- Location of Utah in the United States
- Coordinates: 41°43′17″N 112°09′20″W
- Country: United States
- State: Utah
- County: Box Elder
- Settled: 1888
- Incorporated: January 6, 1906
- City: May 6, 1918
- Founder: John Petty
- Named for: Tremont, Illinois

Area
  - Total: 8.02 sq mi (20.77 km^{2})
  - Land: 8.02 sq mi (20.77 km^{2})
  - Water: 0 sq mi (0.00 km^{2})
- Elevation: 4,331 ft (1,320 m)

Population (2020)
  - Total: 9,894
  - Density: 1,148.2/sq mi (443.31/km^{2})
- Time zone: UTC-7 (Mountain (MST))
  - Summer (DST): UTC-6 (MDT)
- ZIP code: 84337
- Area code: 435
- FIPS code: 49-77120
- GNIS feature ID: 2412091
- Website: tremontoncity.gov

Tremonton is a city in Box Elder County, Utah, United States. The population was 9,894 at the time of the 2020 census. As of 2024, Tremonton has an estimated population of 13,713 and is one of the fastest growing municipalities in the state of Utah (2024 estimate annual growth rate: 7.33%).

== History ==
Although the first settlers came to the Tremonton area in 1888, it remained largely uninhabited until just before 1900, when land agents started promoting the Bear River Valley as a place for Midwestern farmers to relocate. Small groups from Nebraska and Illinois began to arrive in 1898. These settlers were a diverse blend of Protestant faiths, in contrast to their mostly Mormon neighbors. Then an Apostolic Christian Church group came in 1901–1904. The main body was from Tremont, Illinois, joined by a few families from Ohio and Kansas. Mostly of German descent, this group was referred to as the "German colony".

When a townsite was laid out in 1903, the new town was named "Tremont" at the request of the German colony. Within four years, the post office had it renamed "Tremonton" due to confusion with the central Utah town of Fremont. Around 1907 the congregation was caught up in a larger schism of the Apostolic Church. Some moved back to the Midwest, and the German colony came to an end. But the church left a permanent mark in the name of Tremonton.

=== 2025 shooting of police ===
On August 18, 2025, two police officers were shot dead in town, and one other officer and K9 unit were wounded by gunfire resulting from an alleged domestic disturbance suspect that occurred outside the suspect's house at around 9 p.m. It started when the suspect's wife called 911 and reported her husband abusing her. Mass police and law enforcement officers arrived at the scene minutes later. Explosives were discovered in the suspect's house. The alleged shooter was immediately detained, and currently is in the Utah State Jail.

== Geography ==
Tremonton lies in the Bear River Valley in northeastern Box Elder County. The Malad River flows through the city. According to the United States Census Bureau, the city has a total area of 7.8 square miles (20.2 km^{2}), all land. Tremonton is located near the junction of Interstate 15 and Interstate 84. It is bordered on the north by the city of Garland, with which it is closely associated. The town of Elwood is located 2 miles (3 km) to the southeast.

=== Climate ===
Climate data for Tremonton, Utah (1991–2020)
Month	Jan	Feb	Mar	Apr	May	Jun	Jul	Aug	Sep	Oct	Nov	Dec	Year
Mean daily maximum °F (°C)	35.7 (2.1)	41.2 (5.1)	53.3 (11.8)	61.1 (16.2)	70.1 (21.2)	80.8 (27.1)	91.1 (32.8)	89.7 (32.1)	79.2 (26.2)	64.6 (18.1)	49.0 (9.4)	37.4 (3.0)	62.8 (17.1)
Daily mean °F (°C)	27.5 (−2.5)	32.1 (0.1)	42.6 (5.9)	49.0 (9.4)	57.8 (14.3)	67.1 (19.5)	76.5 (24.7)	74.9 (23.8)	64.7 (18.2)	51.2 (10.7)	38.6 (3.7)	29.2 (−1.6)	50.9 (10.5)
Mean daily minimum °F (°C)	19.3 (−7.1)	23.0 (−5.0)	32.0 (0.0)	36.9 (2.7)	45.5 (7.5)	53.4 (11.9)	62.0 (16.7)	60.0 (15.6)	50.2 (10.1)	37.8 (3.2)	28.2 (−2.1)	21.0 (−6.1)	39.1 (4.0)
Average precipitation inches (mm)	2.09 (53)	1.49 (38)	1.33 (34)	1.43 (36)	2.03 (52)	1.17 (30)	0.59 (15)	0.75 (19)	1.08 (27)	1.51 (38)	1.00 (25)	1.60 (41)	16.07 (408)
Average snowfall inches (cm)	12.2 (31)	8.7 (22)	2.8 (7.1)	0.8 (2.0)	0.1 (0.25)	0.0 (0.0)	0.0 (0.0)	0.0 (0.0)	0.0 (0.0)	0.5 (1.3)	4.4 (11)	10.9 (28)	40.4 (102.65)
Source: NOAA

== Demographics ==
Historical population
Census	Pop.	Note	%±
1900	368		—
1910	303		−17.7%
1920	937		209.2%
1930	1,009		7.7%
1940	1,443		43.0%
1950	1,662		15.2%
1960	2,115		27.3%
1970	2,794		32.1%
1980	3,464		24.0%
1990	4,264		23.1%
2000	5,592		31.1%
2010	7,647		36.7%
2020	9,894		29.4%
U.S. Decennial Census

=== 2020 census ===
As of the 2020 census, Tremonton had a population of 9,894. The median age was 28.1 years. 35.7% of residents were under the age of 18 and 9.6% of residents were 65 years of age or older. For every 100 females there were 102.6 males, and for every 100 females age 18 and over there were 98.8 males age 18 and over.

96.3% of residents lived in urban areas, while 3.7% lived in rural areas.

There were 3,095 households in Tremonton, of which 46.8% had children under the age of 18 living in them. Of all households, 62.0% were married-couple households, 14.6% were households with a male householder and no spouse or partner present, and 17.5% were households with a female householder and no spouse or partner present. About 18.5% of all households were made up of individuals and 6.2% had someone living alone who was 65 years of age or older.

There were 3,213 housing units, of which 3.7% were vacant. The homeowner vacancy rate was 1.0% and the rental vacancy rate was 5.0%.

Racial composition as of the 2020 census
Race	Number	Percent
White	8,375	84.6%
Black or African American	27	0.3%
American Indian and Alaska Native	104	1.1%
Asian	137	1.4%
Native Hawaiian and Other Pacific Islander	23	0.2%
Some other race	622	6.3%
Two or more races	606	6.1%
Hispanic or Latino (of any race)	1,335	13.5%

=== 2000 census ===
As of the census of 2000, there were 5,592 people, 1,698 households, and 1,397 families residing in the city. The population density was 1,066.8 people per square mile (412.0/km^{2}). There were 1,822 housing units at an average density of 347.6 per square mile (134.3/km^{2}). The racial makeup of the city was 91.52% White, 0.16% African American, 0.45% Native American, 1.13% Asian, 0.04% Pacific Islander, 5.22% from other races, and 1.48% from two or more races. Hispanic or Latino of any race were 9.71% of the population.

There were 1,698 households, out of which 50.6% had children under the age of 18 living with them, 70.7% were married couples living together, 9.3% had a female householder with no husband present, and 17.7% were non-families. 15.4% of all households were made up of individuals, and 6.9% had someone living alone who was 65 years of age or older. The average household size was 3.26 and the average family size was 3.67.

In the city, 39.0% of the population was under the age of 18, 10.5% from 18 to 24, 26.7% from 25 to 44, 14.7% from 45 to 64, and 9.1% were 65 years of age or older. The median age was 25 years. For every 100 females, there were 98.7 males. For every 100 females age 18 and over, there were 94.8 males.

The median income for a household in the city was $44,784, and the median income for a family was $49,100. Males had a median income of $36,764 versus $22,149 for females. The per capita income for the city was $15,737. About 8.3% of families and 9.9% of the population were below the poverty line, including 14.3% of those under age 18 and none of those age 65 or over.

== Economy ==
Some of the major employers include the Malt-O-Meal cereal company, Lakeshore Learning Materials in nearby Garland, West Liberty Foods, Crump-Reese Motor Co, and Intertape Polymer Group, Inc. In April 2008, La-Z-Boy announced the closure of its Tremonton facility and the layoff of all 630 employees. Some of the plant's production was moved to a facility in Ramos Arizpe, Mexico.

== Education ==
Tremonton has two elementary schools, McKinley Elementary and North Park. Older students attend Alice C. Harris Intermediate in Tremonton, as well as Bear River Middle School and Bear River High School, located in nearby Garland, Utah.

== Notable people ==
- RonNell Andersen Jones, professor of law
- W. Rolfe Kerr, LDS general authority
- Camille Fronk Olson, professor
- Marlon Shirley, two-time Paralympic 100 m champion
- Jay Silvester, U.S. Olympian; former Men's Discus world record holder
- David N. Weidman, retired chairman of the board and CEO of Celanese
- William A. Wilson, LDS folklorist and scholar
