= Bear River (Great Salt Lake) =

River in southwestern Wyoming, southeastern Idaho, and northern Utah

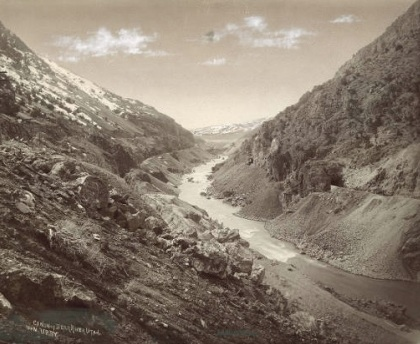
- Bear River Canyon in Utah c. 1869

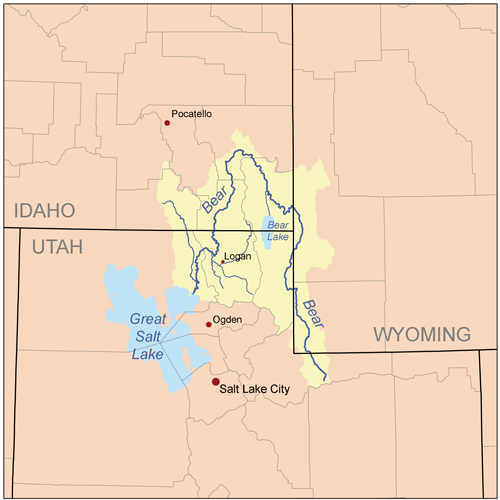
- Map of the Bear River watershed.
- Native name: Wuda Ogwa (Shoshoni)

Location
- Country: United States
- State: Utah, Idaho, Wyoming

Physical characteristics
- Source: Confluence of Hayden Fork and Stillwater Fork
  - location: Uinta Mountains, Summit County, Utah
  - coordinates: 40°52′2″N 110°50′9″W
  - elevation: 8,510 ft (2,590 m)
- Mouth
  - location: Great Salt Lake, Box Elder County, Utah
  - coordinates: 41°27′30″N 112°17′25″W
  - elevation: 4,211 ft (1,284 m)
- Length: 350 mi (560 km)
- Basin size: 7,026 sq mi (18,200 km^{2})
- Discharge
  - location: Corinne, Utah, 4 miles (6.4 km) from the mouth
  - average: 2,410 cu ft/s (68 m^{3}/s)
  - minimum: 25 cu ft/s (0.71 m^{3}/s)
  - maximum: 10,400 cu ft/s (290 m^{3}/s)

The Bear River is the largest tributary of the Great Salt Lake, draining a mountainous area and farming valleys northeast of the lake and southeast of the Snake River Plain. It flows through northeastern Utah, southwestern Wyoming, southeastern Idaho, and back into northern Utah, in the United States. It is approximately 350 miles (560 km) long, making it one of the longest rivers in North America that does not ultimately reach the sea.

== History ==
=== Late Pleistocene ===
The Bear River was a tributary of the Snake River until 140,000 years ago when a volcanic eruption north of Soda Springs, Idaho, diverted it into what was then Lake Bonneville.

=== Recent history ===
The river valley is traditionally inhabited by the Shoshone people, who call the river Wuda Ogwa. Fur trappers from the Hudson's Bay Company began to penetrate the area in the 19th century, exploring south from the Snake River as early as 1812. John C. Frémont explored the area in 1843, and the Mormon Trail crossed the Bear River south of Evanston.

The California and Oregon Trails followed the Bear River north out of Wyoming to Fort Hall in Idaho. Some of the travelers on the trails chose to stay, populating the Bear River Valleys of Idaho and Utah. The Cache Valley was an early destination for Mormon pioneers in the late 1840s.

On January 29, 1863, troops of the United States Army attacked a Shoshone winter village in the Cache Valley, slaughtering most of the Northwestern Band of the Shoshone. The incident has come to be known as the Bear River massacre.

The Bear River was surveyed through the Cache Divide for diversion and irrigation in 1868. After the First transcontinental railroad was completed in 1869, the Central Pacific was given over a third of the land in the Bear River Valley through land grants. Alexander Toponce purchased 52,000 acres (210 km^{2}) of this land in 1883 for $65,000. He and John W. Kerr created the Corinne Mill, Canal and Stock Company and ultimately owned 90,000 acres (360 km^{2}) of land in the area. John R. Bothwell purchased much of this land in 1888. Bothwell created the Jarvis-Conklin Mortgage and Trust Company with Samuel M. Jarvis and Roland R. Conklin, with $2 million on mortgage bonds. The majority of these bonds were bought by Quaker societies in Scotland, England, and Ireland. This money was used to create a diversion dam and irrigation canals, employing 7000 men in late 1889. The company also bought the Ogden City Water Works.

The company went bankrupt by 1893, and bondholders reorganized into the Bear River Irrigation and Ogden Water Works Company with W. H. Rowe as president. Part of the canal project was then purchased by the Bear River Land Company, and part of the irrigation project by the Bear River Irrigation Company.

After the success of the Utah Sugar Company growing operations and factory in Lehi, farmers in the Bear River Valley began to experiment with growing sugar beets. This was successful, so Thomas R. Cutler, George Austin, and Mosiah Evans, executives at the Utah Sugar Company, purchased a portion of the Bear River Irrigation Company and organized the Bear River Land, Orchard and Sugar Beet Company in 1900. Cutler authorized the purchase of the entire Bear River Irrigation Company, plus an option on 31,200 acres (126 km^{2}) of land from the Bear River Land Company in 1901. This was financed by issuing and selling $500,000 in new stock in the Utah Sugar Company. Shortly, 50,000 acres (200 km^{2}) were being irrigated and farmed.

Utah Sugar expanded the east canal between 1902 and 1905, installed a hydroelectric plant on the Bear River, and installed a 2700-horsepower water pump on the west canal. They also negotiated with the Oregon Short Line to construct a railroad from Corinne 16 miles (26 km) north to Garland, which was completed in 1903. Utah Sugar built a sugar beet processing factory in 1903, also using the newly constructed rail line to transport the necessary machinery.

In 1911 a dam was constructed at Wardboro, Idaho, that diverted the majority of the flow of the Bear River into Bear Lake, via Mud Lake to act as a reservoir for the irrigation district. Water rejoins the river via an outlet canal a short distance downstream from the diversion

Utah Sugar's water rights, dams, hydroelectric plant, and transmission lines were purchased by Utah Power & Light, now known as Rocky Mountain Power, in December 1912 for $1.75 million. Utah Sugar purchased the canals on both sides of the Bear River in 1920 and controlled them at least through the 1960s.

== Course ==
Since the river was diverted 140,000 years ago, the course of the river essentially makes a large inverted U around the north end of the Wasatch Range. It rises in northeastern Utah in several short forks on the north side of the high Uinta Mountains in southern Summit County. The main stem Bear River begins at the confluence of two tributaries, Hayden Fork and Stillwater Fork. The Hayden Fork originates north of Hayden Pass, just west of Hayden Peak. The Stillwater Fork originates in the Middle Basin, a plateau with an elevation of about 10,000 feet (3,000 m) and surrounded by high peaks of Mount Agassiz, Hayden Peak, and Spread Eagle Peak. One of the Stillwater Fork's tributaries is called Main Fork, which originates in another high–altitude basin called Hell Hole.

From its source, the Bear River flows north, cutting across the southwest corner of Wyoming, passing through Evanston then weaving along the Utah-Wyoming state line as it flows north. It turns northwest into Bear Lake County, Idaho, and flows through the Bear Lake Valley in Idaho. There, the majority of the river flow is diverted into Bear Lake, which straddles the Idaho-Utah border, before rejoining the main river course near Montpelier via the Bear Lake Outlet Canal a short distance downstream from the diversion. At Soda Springs, near the north end of the Wasatch Range, the Bear River turns abruptly south, flowing past Preston in the broad Cache Valley that extends north from Logan, Utah. It re-enters northern Utah, meandering south past Cornish and Newton. It is impounded to form the Cutler Reservoir, where it receives the Little Bear River from the south. From the west end of Cutler Reservoir, it flows south through the Bear River Valley of Utah past Bear River City. It receives the Malad River from the north just before emptying into the mud flats of a broad bay on the east side of the Great Salt Lake; approximately 10 miles (16 km) southwest of Brigham City.

== Uses and protected areas ==
The river is used extensively for irrigation in the farming valleys through which it flows in its lower reaches in Idaho and northern Utah.

The lower 10 miles (16 km) of the river near its delta on the Great Salt Lake are protected as part of Bear River Migratory Bird Refuge.

== See also ==
- Bear River State Park
- List of rivers in the Great Basin
- List of Utah rivers
- List of longest streams of Idaho
- Mormon Trail
