= Lauritzen =

Lauritzen may refer to:

Surname:

- Carl Lauritzen (1879–1940), Danish actor
- Dag Otto Lauritzen (born 1956), retired Norwegian professional cyclist
- Flemming Lauritzen (born 1949), former Danish handball player who competed in the 1972 Summer Olympics
- Henny Lauritzen (1871–1938), Danish stage and film actress of the silent era in Denmark
- Jan Thomas Lauritzen (born 1974), Norwegian handball player
- Jens Lauritzen (born 1953), Danish politician
- Lau Lauritzen Sr. (1878–1938), Danish film director, screenwriter, and actor of the silent era
- Lau Lauritzen Jr. (1910–1977), Danish actor, screenwriter, and film director
- Lauritz Lauritzen (1910–1980), German politician of the Social Democratic Party of Germany (SPD)
- Per Roger Lauritzen (born 1956), Norwegian non-fiction writer
- Peter Lauritzen (born 1959), Danish civil servant
- Sarah Lauritzen (born 1976), Danish rower
- Sebastian Lauritzen (born 1983), Swedish professional ice hockey winger
- Steffen Lauritzen (born 1947), Head of the Department of Statistics at the University of Oxford
- Torkil Lauritzen (1901–1979), Danish actor
- Vilhelm Lauritzen (1894–1984), Danish modern architect, founder of Vilhelm Lauritzen Arkitekter

Geography:

- Lauritzen Bay indents the coast of Antarctica between Cape Yevgenov and Coombes Ridge
- Lauritzen Canal, shipping waterway, part of the larger Port of Richmond in Richmond, California
- Lauritzen Gardens, (formally Omaha Botanical Gardens), botanical gardens and arboretum in Omaha, Nebraska

Corporate:

- J. Lauritzen A/S (JL), Danish shipping company with worldwide operations headquartered in Copenhagen
- Vilhelm Lauritzen Architects (VLA), architectural firm based in Copenhagen, Denmark
- Lauritzen Corporation, financial and interstate bank holding company headquartered in Omaha, Nebraska

== See also ==
- Lauritzen Award (Danish: Lauritzen-prisen), Danish film award
- Lauritzen Hoffman Growth Theory or Hoffman nucleation theory, describes the crystallization of a polymer in terms of the kinetics and thermodynamics of polymer surface nucleation
- Lauritzen A.S. v Wijsmuller B.V, (The Super Servant Two), a Court of Appeal case in English contract law
- Lauritz (given name)
- Ritzen (surname)
