= Lauritz =

Lauritz is a typically masculine given name, a Scandinavian form of the English Laurence or Lawrence. Another Danish and Estonian form is Laurits.

== Popularity in Scandinavia ==
The name has been decreasing in popularity in all Scandinavian countries ever since the 1880s. The table below shows percentage of the respective country's population named Lauritz or Laurits.

| Country | Percentage | Reference |
|---|---|---|
| Denmark | 0.009% | |
| Norway | 0.05% | |
| Sweden | 0.286% | |

== People ==
People with the given name Lauritz include:

- Andreas Lauritz Thune (1848–1920), Norwegian engineer and businessman
- Vidkun Abraham Lauritz Jonssøn Quisling (1887–1945), Norwegian politician
- Carl Lauritz Mechelborg Oppen (1830–1914), Norwegian jurist and politician
- Claus Lauritz Clausen (1820–92), American Lutheran minister and politician
- Jan-Lauritz Opstad (1950–2018), Norwegian museum director and art historian
- Jens Lauritz Arup (1793–1874), Norwegian bishop and politician
- Johan Lauritz Eidem (1891–1984), Norwegian politician
- Johan Lauritz Rasch (1829–1901), Norwegian jurist and politician
- Lauritz Petersen Aakjær (1883–1959), Danish architect
- Lauritz Bergendahl (1887–1964), Norwegian Nordic skier
- Lauritz Christiansen (sailor) (1867–1930), Norwegian sailor who competed in the 1920 Summer Olympics
- Lauritz Dippenaar, South African businessman
- Lauritz Jenssen Dorenfeldt (engineer) (1863–1932), Norwegian engineer, son of Lauritz Jenssen, father of Lauritz Jenssen Dorenfeldt the jurist
- Lauritz Jenssen Dorenfeldt (jurist) (1909–97), Norwegian jurist, son of Lauritz Jenssen Dorenfeldt the engineer
- Lauritz Falk (1909–90), Swedish actor, film director, singer and painter
- Lauritz Galtung (c. 1615–61), Norwegian nobleman
- Lauritz Hartz (1903–87), Danish artist
- Lauritz Peter Holmblad (1815–90), Danish industrialist and philanthropist
- Lauritz Dorenfeldt Jenssen (1801–59), Norwegian businessperson, father of Lauritz Jenssen
- Lauritz Jenssen (1837–99), Norwegian businessperson and politician, son of Lauritz Dorenfeldt Jenssen, father of Lauritz Jenssen Dorenfeldt
- Lauritz Johnson (1906–92), Norwegian novelist, children's writer, and radio and television host
- Lauritz Lauritzen (1910–80), German politician
- Lauritz Melchior (1890–1973), Danish-born operatic baritone and tenor who relocated to America
- Lauritz Nelson (1860–1944), U.S. naval sailor, recipient of the Medal of Honor
- Lauritz Opstad (1917–2003), Norwegian museum director and historian
- Lauritz Christian Østrup (1881–1940), Danish fencer who competed at the 1908 and 1912 Summer Olympics
- Lauritz Kolderup Rosenvinge (1858–1939), Danish botanist and phycologist
- Lauritz Kristian Nilssen Rygh (1874–1950), Norwegian journalist, newspaper editor and politician
- Lauritz Sand (1879–1956), Norwegian topographer, officer in the Dutch army, estate owner in the Dutch East Indies, businessman, and resistance fighter during World War II
- Lauritz Schmidt (1897–1970), Norwegian yacht racer and businessperson
- Lauritz Schoof (born 1990), German rower who competed in the 2012 Summer Olympics
- Lauritz Bernhard Sirevaag (1926–2016), Norwegian politician
- Lauritz Smith (1830–1924), American Mormon leader, one of the founders of Draper, Utah
- Lauritz de Thurah (1706–59), Danish architect and architectural writer
- Lauritz Weibull (1873–1960), Swedish historian
- Lauritz Weidemann (1775–1856), Norwegian judge, civil servant and politician
- Lauritz Wigand-Larsen (1895–1951), Norwegian gymnast who competed in the 1920 Summer Olympics
- Mads Lauritz Madsen (1782–1840), Norwegian politician
- Niels Lauritz Dahl (1925–2014), Norwegian diplomat
- Thomas Johannes Lauritz Parr (1862–1935), Norwegian educator and psychologist

== See also ==
- Lauritz H. and Emma Smith House, a historic house in Draper, Utah
- Lauritz Smith House, a different historic house in Draper, Utah
- Laurits (disambiguation)
- Lauritzen (disambiguation)
