= Opstad =

Opstad is a surname. Notable people with the surname include:

- Jan-Lauritz Opstad (1950–2018), Norwegian museum director and art historian
- Lauritz Opstad (1917–2003), Norwegian museum director and historian
- Steinar Opstad (born 1971), Norwegian poet
