= Lauritzen Corporation =

American holding company

- Type: Private
- Industry: Finance and Insurance
- Founded: Omaha, Nebraska, U.S.
- Headquarters: Omaha, Nebraska, U.S.
- Products: Financial services
- Owner: Lauritzen Family (Majority)

Lauritzen Corporation is an American financial and interstate bank holding company headquartered in Omaha, Nebraska, US. Lauritzen Corporation currently has bank branches in Nebraska and Iowa, and has total assets of approximately $1.36 billion. In addition to banks, Lauritzen Corporation has five holding companies and 15 insurance or financial companies. Lauritzen Corporation has an approximately 28% voting share in First National of Nebraska, Inc. It is one of the 50 largest banks in the United States ranked by total deposits, and is ranked among the top 200 United States banks by The Banker financial journal.

== History ==
In 1947, John Lauritzen decided to go into business for himself. While he was assistant cashier at the First National Bank of Omaha, and months before he became an assistant vice president at the bank, he sold his house for $14,000, and the site of his future home for $3,000. He used this $17,000 and another $17,000 in borrowed money to purchase a bank in Emerson, Iowa. At the age of 28, he became the youngest bank president in the country.

Five years later, he purchased the First State Bank of Loomis, Nebraska. At the time, he could afford to purchase only 51 percent of the shares. The current owners of the bank told Lauritzen that he would need to buy 100 percent or nothing at all. He then purchased the bank and then quickly re-sold the remaining 49 percent.

After the death of T.L. Davis' in 1955, Lauritzen acquired control of the Washington County Bank, in 1956, the Farmers and Merchants Bank in Bloomfield (1958) and the Burt County State Bank in Tekamah (1961). In 1958, he formed what could be called the forerunner of today's Lauritzen Corporation to oversee his rapidly expanding holdings. Lauritzen then abruptly resigned from the First National to devote all of his energies to his growing chain of small banks.

Lauritzen had been appointed to the board of directors in 1953 and promoted to senior vice president three years after that. Members of First National's management team refused to accept his resignation. Both sides agreed that Lauritzen would work for First National half time, at half pay, and half time for his own string of banks.

== Ownership ==
Lauritzen Corporation is privately held primarily by the Lauritzen family. Bruce R. Lauritzen exercised sole investment and voting power which he shared with his mother, Elizabeth D. Lauritzen. Many members of the Lauritzen family are associated with the individual companies within the Lauritzen Corporation.

Bruce R. Lauritzen was the chief executive officer of Lauritzen Corporation, as well as chairman of First National of Nebraska, Inc., First National Bank of Omaha, and more than a dozen other banks and bank holding companies operating in Nebraska, Iowa, Illinois, South Dakota, Kansas, Colorado and Texas until his death in February 2024. His combined organizations held more than $20 billion in assets and 7,500 employees in 31 states. His son Clark Lauritzen took over as Chairman and President of Lauritzen Corporation, First National of Nebraska, Inc., and First National Bank of Omaha.

== Banking subsidiaries ==
=== Crawford County Bank ===
A subsidiary of The Viking Corporation
Branch in Iowa: Denison

Crawford County Bank started operations in 1927, and has maintained the same name since.

=== Farmers & Merchants State Bank ===
Branches in Nebraska: Bloomfield, Crofton, Center, Hartington, and Niobrara
Branch in South Dakota: Yankton

Farmers and Merchants State Bank was chartered in 1890. As it has grown over the years, it has taken pride in being a family owned and orientated bank.

=== First State Bank ===
A subsidiary of the Loomis Company, Inc.
Branches in Nebraska: Loomis and Alma

First State Bank opened for business in 1886. Its first office was located in a hardware store office. In 1938, First State Bank's assets were the largest of any town in Nebraska with a population of 1,000 or less. The Lauritzen family purchased First State Bank in 1952. First State Bank added a branch in Alma by purchasing the Harlan County Bank in 2006.

=== Houghton State Bank ===
Branches in Iowa: Red Oak, Cumberland, Elliott and Emerson

=== Landmands Bank ===
A subsidiary of Viking Corporation
Branches in Iowa: Audubon and Kimballton

Landmands Bank has a mission "to be the premier financial institution in its trade area, committed to long-term growth and profitability, while taking the lead in the area's economic vitality."

=== Shelby County State Bank ===
Branches in Iowa: Harlan, Elk Horn, Panama, Portsmouth, Irwin and Shelby

Shelby County State Bank was first organized as a state bank in 1880 under the name of the Shelby County Bank. BL Harding was the first bank President and the bank began with $50,000 in assets. The Shelby County Bank was officially incorporated in 1894.

In 1906, the Shelby County Bank and First National Bank were consolidated under the name of the Shelby County State Bank. In May 1911, H.P. Dowling presided as bank President and by 1913 the deposits of the bank had reached a total of $780,000.

In 1933, The Farmers and Merchants Savings Bank of Harlan merged with The Shelby County State Bank. For the convenience of its customers, a branch bank was established in Elk Horn, Iowa that same year.

By the time H. Rand Petersen became SCSB President in 1957, SCSB had $5 million in assets. In 1972, Rand helped SCSB construct the first drive-in bank in Harlan located on the corner of 5th and Court St. In 1975, the SCSB main office changed locations from 1012 6th St. and built a new bank which joined the established Drive-in Bank at 508 Court St.

Within nine years SCSB merged with four other banks including Panama and Portsmouth in 1986, Irwin in 1992 and Shelby in 1995. In 1993 the bank converted the former ‘Lil Duffer restaurant into what's now the Harlan West Branch on Highway 59.

Soon after the bank's merger with the State Bank of Portsmouth, Jerry Lapke became President of SCSB. Current SCSB President Roger Claypool has assumed those same duties since 1996. Today, SCSB has total assets of over $210 million.

=== Sibley State Bank ===
A subsidiary of KBJ Enterprises, Inc.
Branch in Iowa: Sibley

=== Washington County Bank ===
Branches in Nebraska: Blair and Tekamah

Washington County Bank first opened for business on April 5, 1904, in the town of Washington, Nebraska, as Washington State Bank. The bank merged with the Kennard State Bank of Kennard in May 1930. On July 1, 1933, Kennard State Bank moved to Blair and opened as Washington County Bank. John R. Lauritzen acquired control of Washington County Bank in 1955, three years before forming the Lauritzen Corporation. In 2004, the bank completed a merger with its sister bank, Burt County State Bank, in Tekamah. In 2007, Washington County Bank opened their third branch in Omaha.

=== York State Bank ===
Branches in Nebraska: York, Geneva, and Gresham

Dean Sack obtained a charter for a new bank in 1943, and opened on July 13. Just after the opening of York State Bank, Sack charted the Henderson State Bank in October 1944, and another bank in Benedict, Nebraska, the same year. York State Bank was sold to the Lauritzen Corporation in 1995, and continues to support the education, industrial and agricultural aspects of York County today.

== Non-banking subsidiaries ==
- The Harry A. Koch Company
- NAEDA Financial, LTD.
  - Partnered with: Diversified Financial Services, LLC

== See also ==
- First National of Nebraska, Inc. -- Bruce Lauritzen's secondary ownership
- Lauritzen Gardens, Omaha's Botanical Center, made possible through the philanthropy of the Lauritzen family.
