= Omaha Steaks =

Steak company in the United States

Omaha Steaks International, Inc.
- Type: Private
- Industry: Mail order Retail; Gourmet food
- Founded: 1917; 109 years ago
- Headquarters: Omaha, Nebraska
- Products: Food
- Number of employees: 1,500 (2022)
- Website: www.omahasteaks.com

Omaha Steaks International, Inc., known as Omaha Steaks, is an American food company that manufactures, markets, and distributes steaks, meat, seafood, and some prepared foods. The company is named after Omaha, Nebraska, the city in which it was founded and is still headquartered.

== History ==
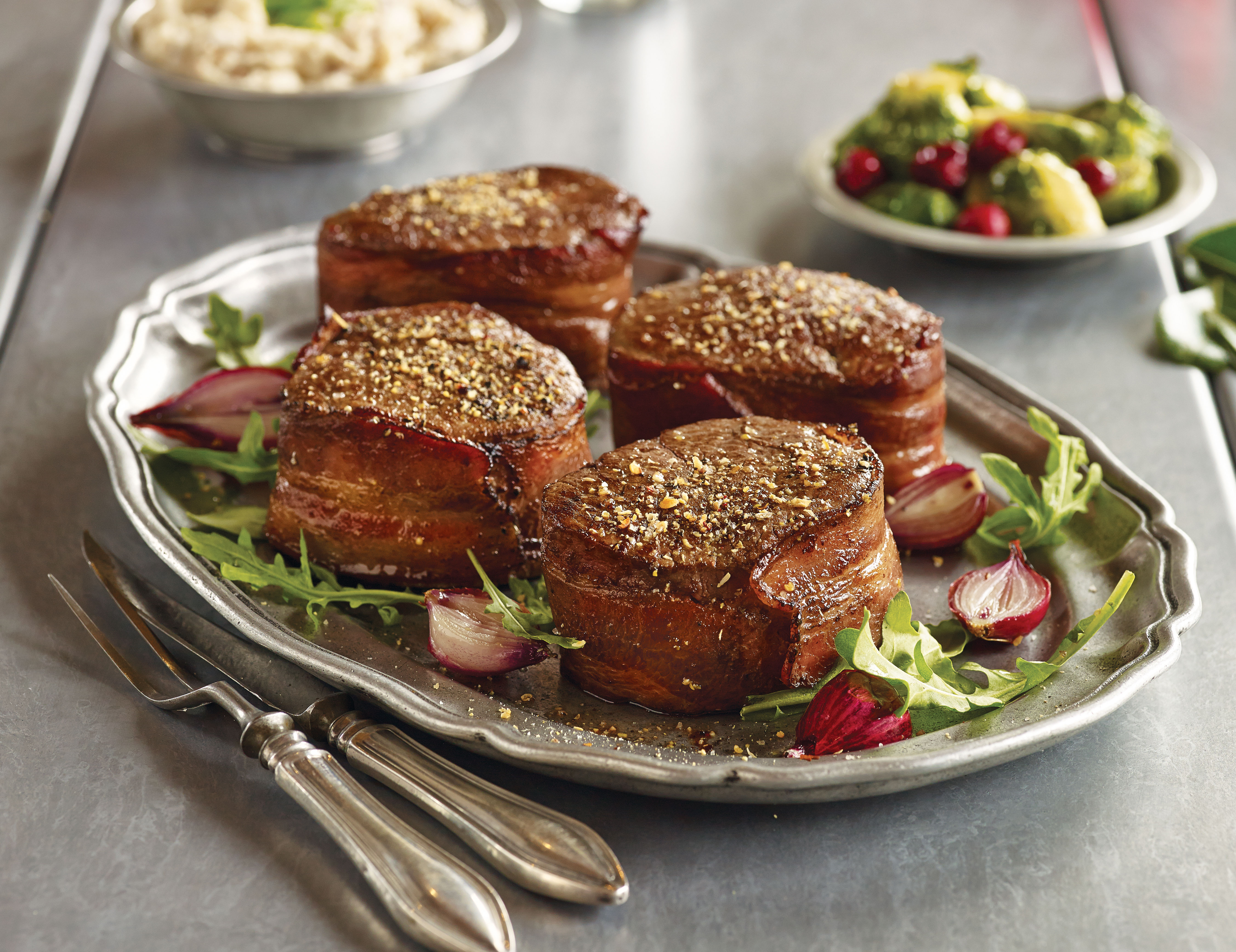
Omaha Steaks Bacon-Wrapped Filet Mignon

In 1850, Lazar Shames founded a packing house and meat market in Riga (then in the Livonian Governorate of the Russian Empire, today in Latvia). In 1898 his son J.J. and his family fled religious persecution in Latvia and came to the United States as part of the third wave of Jewish immigration to the country. They passed through Ellis Island, chose Simon as their American name, and eventually arrived in Omaha, which was experiencing a population surge due in part to the development of the meat packing industry. J.J. and his son B.A. worked as butchers for many years, and then in 1917 the family started their own meat-cutting operation. The business was located in downtown Omaha in the current location of the First National Center. The previous occupant in that space had been a carpentry shop called "Table Supply Co." and the Simons changed the name to Table Supply Meat Co.

In 1924, the Simons moved the business to a new location in what is now Omaha's Old Market neighborhood and began selling their cuts of beef to local supermarkets and national chain grocery stores, hotel restaurants, and institutional customers.

In 1929, B.A. Simon's son Lester joined the business and helped expand its distribution. In the 1940s Lester brokered a deal with the Union Pacific Railroad to begin serving Omaha Steaks in the dining cars of their transcontinental trains. Lester selected the meat for the passenger trains that traveled between Omaha and Los Angeles, San Francisco, and Seattle.

The mail-order business began in 1952, as orders packed in dry ice and cardboard cartons lined with wax paper were shipped via train. In the early 1960s innovations in shipping like insulated-foam coolers, vacuum packaging, and direct parcel shipping helped Omaha Steaks transform itself into a direct marketer. Catalogs were mailed to customers for the first time in 1963, and gradually expanded to include not only steaks, but poultry, pork, seafood, side dishes, and desserts. In 1966, the company changed its name to Omaha Steaks and moved to a new plant.

Omaha Steaks opened its first retail store in Omaha in 1976. Before then, buying a product from the company was limited to eating at certain restaurants that offered its products or ordering meats from its mail-order catalog. In 1984, half of the company's sales came through such catalogs along with other direct-mail campaigns, and the other half came through sales to restaurants, hotels, and institutions. In 1985, the company expanded its retail operations beyond Nebraska, opening a store in Houston, and as of 2021 it operated 48 total retail stores in 20 states.

Omaha Steaks was an early adopter of digital marketing. The company placed its first online ad on CompuServ in 1991, and by 1995 it had a robust presence on America Online and a fully functional website. Through these platforms, the company was receiving around 20,000 responses a month. Omaha Steaks became part of the Microsoft Network (later MSN) in 1998. That same year the company opened new corporate and marketing offices next to its expanded telemarketing facility.

== Operations ==
Omaha Steaks manufactures, markets, and distributes a variety of steaks and other meats, including seafood, chicken, and pork, along with appetizers, sides, and desserts. The company is headquartered in Omaha, Nebraska, and as of 2020 was the city's 24th largest employer. Omaha Steaks employs 1,500 workers. During the holidays, the company hires more than 3,000 temporary workers to meet increased consumer demand. In addition to its corporate and marketing office, its facilities include three manufacturing plants, two distribution centers, and a freezer warehouse.

National and international markets for the company's products include food service, mail order, incentive, telesales, retail stores, licensed-restaurants, sales to specialty and food stores, and interactive sales. Omahasteaks.com was founded as a separate company to provide more comprehensive service for online customers. Omaha Steaks products are shipped in coolers with dry ice. During peak season, the company can ship as many as 100,000 packages a day. Retail stores carry the same products offered through mail order.

Todd Simon serves as chairman and chief steak evangelist of Omaha Steaks, and Nate Rempe serves as the company's president and chief executive officer.

== Branding and marketing ==
Omaha Steaks uses the tagline "America's Original Butcher", and offering premium steaks via innovative packaging and delivery. The company was an early pioneer in direct-to-consumer sales, and continues to employ an omnichannel approach to marketing that reflects its roots in teleservices and direct mailing.

The company was an early adopter of telemarketing, fax ordering, and online sales, and engages customers through direct mail, online marketing, and retail stores. In the mid-1990s, Omaha Steaks expanded its corporate-sales unit and created a separate corporate catalog that was intended to serve corporate buyers who were already customers.

In 1958, Omaha Steaks ran its first ad for mail-order steaks in The New Yorker, and has since become the longest-running advertiser in that publication.

In 2014, an Oregon man brought a class-action suit against Omaha Steaks for violations of the Telephone Consumer Protection Act of 1991 after receiving unwanted robocalls from the company. The suit was settled for $2 million in 2016.

Chef James Beard served as a spokesperson for the company in the 1970s and cookbook author Merle Ellis served as a spokesperson in the 1980s. In 2010, Omaha Steaks was granted a trademark for the phrase "The Official Sponsor of Tailgating." In October 2020, Omaha Steaks announced that chef David Rose would serve as the company's executive chef and spokesperson, and also consult on product development.

== Cookbooks ==
In 1997, Frederick J. Simon, the great-grandson of Omaha Steaks founder J.J. Simon, wrote The Steaklover's Companion, a cookbook created in collaboration with celebrity chefs. The book was intended to be the first in a series, and another, Beef For All Seasons, was published the following year. Since then Omaha Steaks has published numerous cookbooks, including The Great Gathering Guide and Cookbook, Omaha Steaks: Let's Grill and Omaha Steaks: Meat.

== Philanthropy ==
Omaha Steaks supports local and national charities and arts organizations, as well as education scholarships. Organizations supported by the company and family have included Bemis Center for Contemporary Arts, Film Streams, Santa Fe Opera. Juvenile Diabetes Research Foundation, National Multiple Sclerosis Society, American Heart Association, American Cancer Society, and Big Brothers Big Sisters of America. The company also works with the disaster relief organization Mercy Chefs, Feeding America, and Food Bank for the Heartland.

== Works or publications ==
=== Television ===
- Omaha Steaks on CNBC The Big Idea (12/5/06)
- Omaha Steaks on Hell's Kitchen (December 10, 2014)

=== Cookbooks ===
- Harrisson, John, and Frederick J. Simon. Omaha Steaks: Let's Grill. New York: Clarkson Potter, 2001. ISBN 978-0-6096-0776-3
- Harrisson, John, and Frederick J. Simon. Omaha Steaks Meat. New York, N.Y: C. Potter, 2001. ISBN 978-0-6096-0777-0
- Simon, Frederick J, John Harrisson, and Mark Kiffin. The Steaklover's Companion: 170 Savory Recipes from America's Greatest Chefs. New York: HarperCollins, 1997. ISBN 978-0-0601-8781-1 Adapts dishes from recipes developed by James Beard, who had been an Omaha Steaks consultant for many years.
- Simon, Frederick J, and John Harrisson. A year of beef recipes : beef for all seasons. New York: HarperCollins, 1999. ISBN 978-0-0601-9382-9
- The Great American Grilling Book. New York: Time, Inc. Home Entertainment, 2008. ISBN 978-1-6032-0020-2
- Omaha Steaks International good life guide and cookbook, a yearly volume
- Great Gathering Guide & Cookbook, a free cookbook and cooking guide with coupons

== See also ==
- Direct marketing
- Gourmet foods
