= Clem's Opera House =

- U.S. National Register of Historic Places
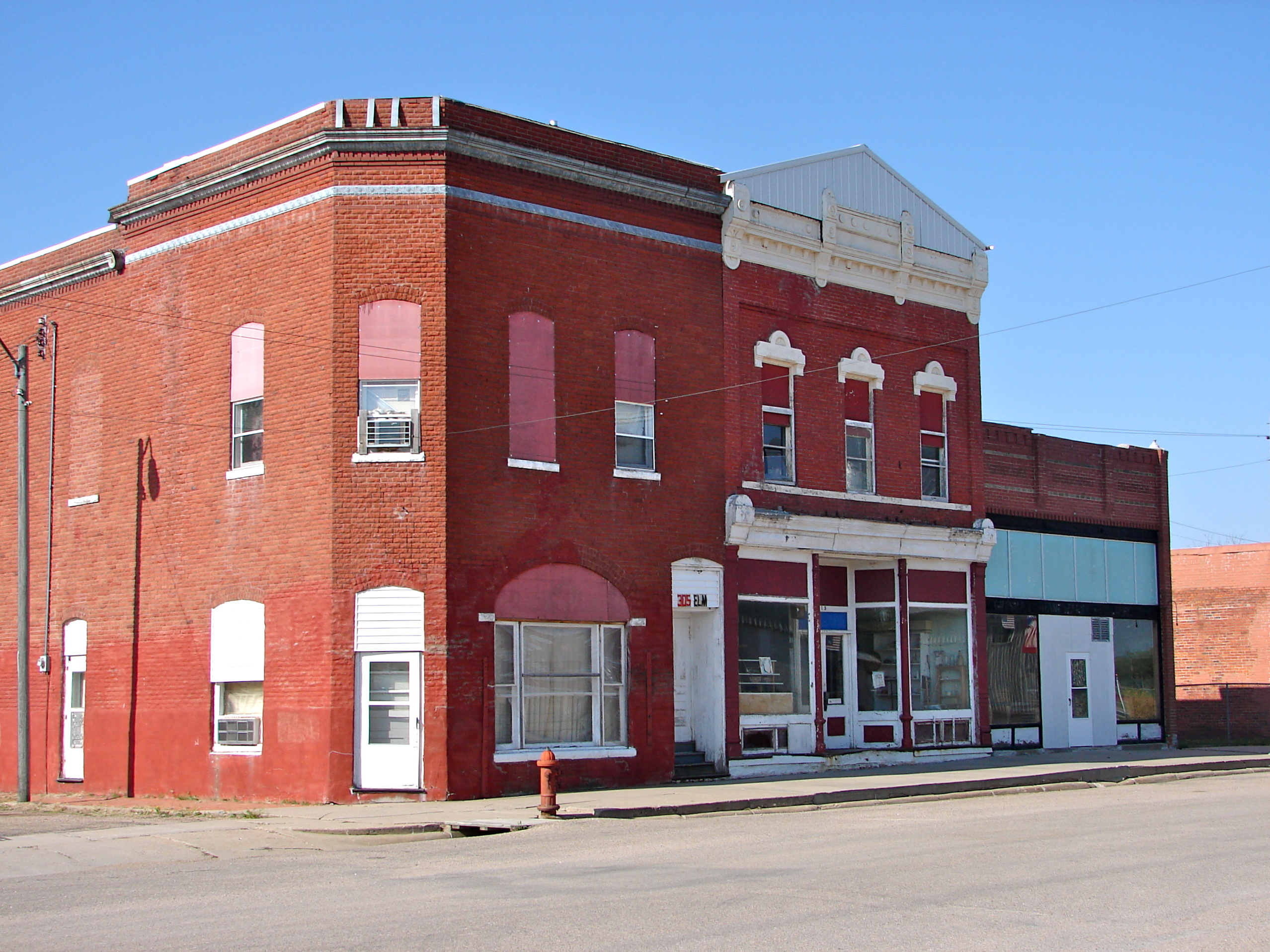

- Location within Nebraska Location within the United States
- Location: Main and Post Sts., Gresham, Nebraska
- Coordinates: 41°1′41″N 97°24′7″W
- Area: less than one acre
- Built: c.1891
- Architectural style: Two-part commercial block
- MPS: Opera House Buildings in Nebraska 1867-1917 MPS
- NRHP reference No.: 88000949
- Added to NRHP: September 28, 1988

Clem's Opera House, at Main and Post Sts. in Gresham, Nebraska, is a building constructed in about 1891. It has also been denoted NeHBS #YK04-1 and OHBIN #03-01-02.

Clem's Opera House was built around 1891 by local merchants A. L. Clem and Noah Clem along with Dr. W. N. Hynton. The building, which is the middle structure between the other two buildings shown in the photograph on this article, has a flat roof hidden by an elaborate cornice, pressed metal decorations above the windows, and a stone ledge demarcating the first story.

The theatre is relatively small, measuring 56 ft (17 meters) from the rear wall to the proscenium and about 23 ft wide (7 meters). The stage is framed with a 9-foot tall 12-foot wide (2.5 by 3.6 meter) wooden proscenium arch. An apron, curving to 2.5 ft (0.7 meters) augments the 12 ft (3.6 meter) deep stage. On either side of the stage, behind the curtain line, is a 5 ft 9 inch (1.75 meter) wing which is the only backstage area as there are no dressing rooms.

At the time of its construction, the opera house was the only two-story brick building in Gresham and served a variety of functions. The venue hosted both touring and home-grown theatrical and musical performances, for lectures, and for movies. It also provided a location for community gatherings, including box socials, high-school commencements, farmer's institutes, and political-party meetings.

The building was listed on the National Register of Historic Places in 1988, qualifying as historically significant based on the criteria of social history, the performing arts, and entertainment and recreation.
