= First National of Nebraska =

American bank holding company

First National of Nebraska, Inc.
- Type: Public
- Traded as: OTC Pink Current: FINN
- Industry: Finance and Insurance
- Founded: August 27, 1968; 57 years ago
- Headquarters: Omaha, Nebraska, United States
- Key people: Clark Lauritzen (president)
- Services: Financial services
- Owner: Lauritzen Corporation
- Website: www.fnni.com

First National of Nebraska, Inc. is an American interstate bank holding company based in Omaha, Nebraska, United States, and is the parent company of First National Bank of Omaha. It is an affiliate of the Lauritzen Corporation and is primarily owned by the Lauritzen family. It is on the list of largest banks in the United States and is the oldest national bank headquartered west of the Missouri River.

== History ==
Two immigrant brothers from Ohio, Herman Kountze and Augustus Kountze, founded the bank as Kountze Brothers Bank in 1857. It traded primarily in gold dust and bison hides. The bank received national charter #209 in 1863 and began doing business as First National Bank of Omaha. It brought in additional investors, including Edward Creighton, who served as president.

In 1953, under the leadership of John Lauritzen, First National Bank became the first bank in the region and the fifth in the nation to issue credit cards.

In 1968, the bank was reorganized under the bank holding company, First National of Nebraska, Inc.

In 1971, employees started moving into the 22-story First National Center. Attached to a 420-room hotel and a 550-stall parking garage, it became one of the most modern buildings in the region, providing economic development in downtown Omaha.

In 1987, Bruce Lauritzen was named president of the bank.

In 2002, First National Bank completed construction on the First National Bank Tower, the tallest building between Chicago and Denver.

From 2006 to 2009, Rajive Johri was president of the bank.

From 2009 to 2017, Dan O'Neil was president of the bank.

On September 30, 2010, the bank holding company, First National of Nebraska, consolidated its bank charters of First National Bank of Colorado, in Fort Collins, Colorado; First National Bank of Kansas, in Overland Park, Kansas; and Castle Bank, in DeKalb, Illinois, with its First National Bank of Omaha charter.

In 2010, the bank sold a 51% interest in its merchant acquiring business to TSYS for $150.5 million. TSYS acquired the remaining 49% of the business the following year.

In 2014, the bank holding company consolidated the charter of First National Bank South Dakota with the charter of First National Bank of Omaha.

In 2017, Clark Lauritzen was named president of the bank.

In 2018, the bank ended its credit card affinity program with the National Rifle Association of America (NRA) due to customer complaints after the Parkland high school shooting.
