= Rinckel Mansion =

Historic residence in Carson City, Nevada, United States

- U.S. National Register of Historic Places
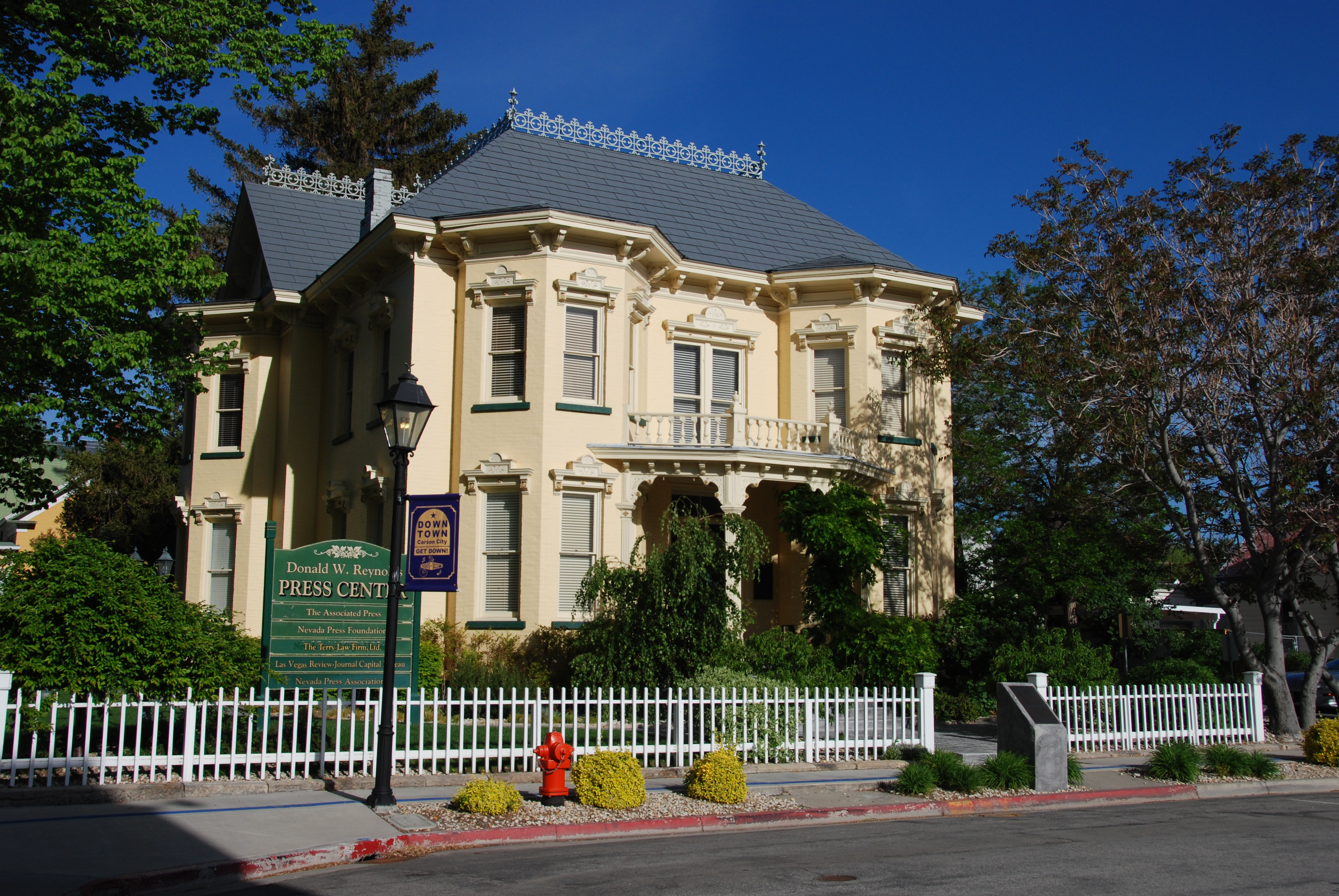
- Rinckel Mansion, May 2009

- Location within Nevada Location within the United States
- Location: 102 North Curry Street; Carson City, Nevada; United States
- Coordinates: 39°9′51″N 119°46′1″W
- Area: 1 acre (0.40 ha)
- Built: 1875
- Architect: Jones, Charles H.
- Architectural style: Late Victorian, French Victorian
- NRHP reference No.: 75002129
- Added to NRHP: November 20, 1975

The Rinckel Mansion is a historic house in Carson City, Nevada, United States, that is listed on the National Register of Historic Places (NRHP).

== Description ==
The house is located at 102 North Curry Street and was built in 1872. It was home of Mathias Rinckel, a merchant in Carson City. It was designed and built by Ecole de Beaux Arts-trained architect Charles H. Jones. It was deemed significant for its association with Rinckel and "because it is one of the finest and best-preserved examples of French Victorian architecture remaining in the American West."

It was listed on the NRHP November 20, 1975. The building has been owned by the Nevada Press Foundation since 2000 and houses the offices of the Nevada Press Association.

== See also ==
- National Register of Historic Places listings in Carson City, Nevada
- Lauritz H. and Emma Smith House, Draper, Utah, another NRHP-listed work of Charles H. Jones
