= William D. Skeen House =

- U.S. National Register of Historic Places
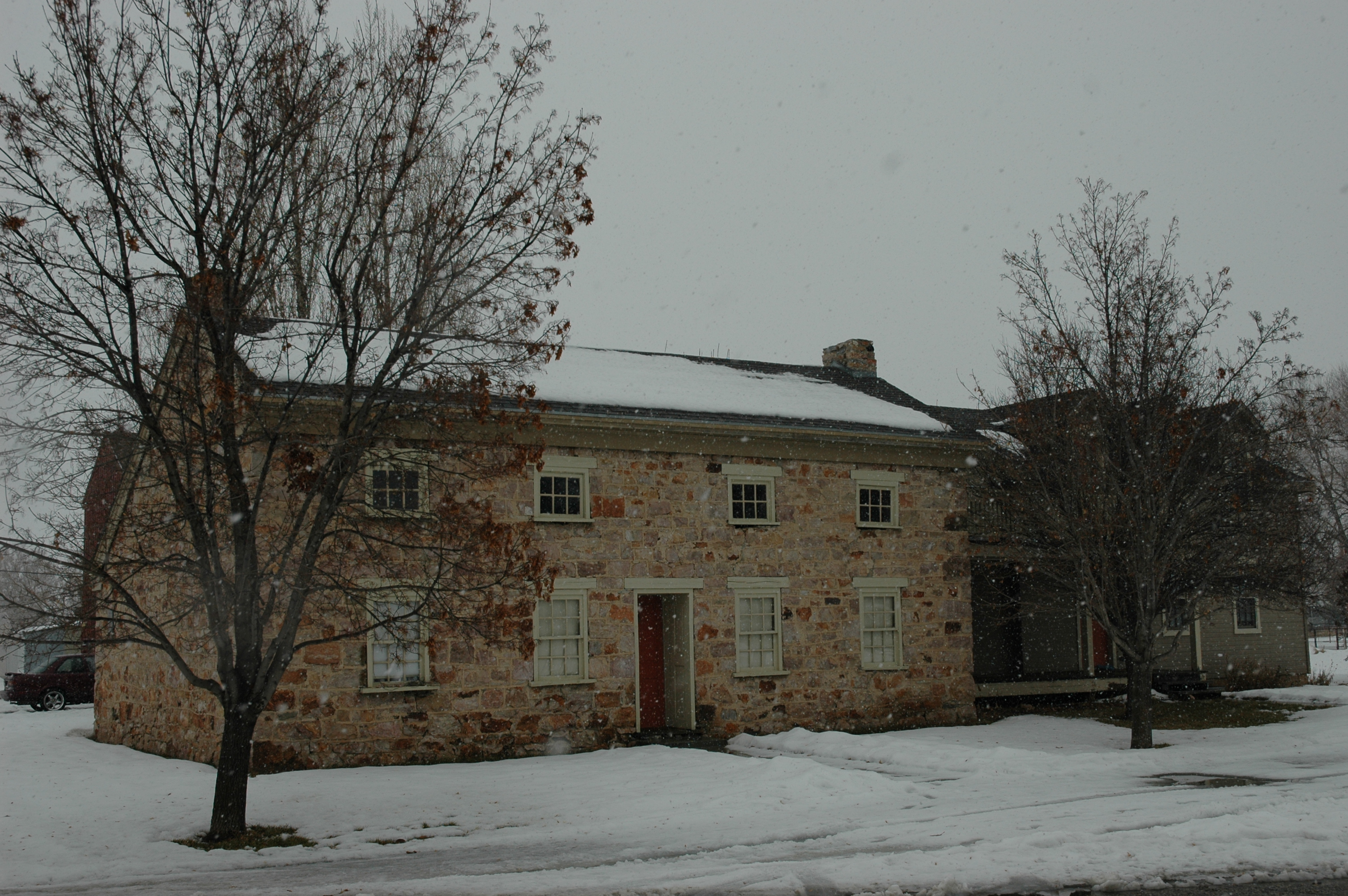
- The house in 2010

- Location within Utah Location within the United States
- Location: Plain City, Utah
- Coordinates: 41°18′16″N 112°05′08″W
- Area: less than one acre
- Built: 1862
- Built by: Sharp, William; Singleton, Thomas
- Architectural style: Saltbox Roof
- NRHP reference No.: 82004191
- Added to NRHP: August 9, 1982

The William D. Skeen House is a historic house in Plain City, Utah. It was built in 1862 for William D. Skeen, a Pennsylvania-born pioneer who converted to the Church of Jesus Christ of Latter-day Saints in 1850. Skeen had two wives: his first wife, Caroline, was an immigrant from England, while his second wife, Mary Davis, was an immigrant from Wales. The house was built with the help of two other Mormon pioneers: William Sharp, the stonemason, and Thomas Singleton, a carpenter. The house was purchased in 1868 by Ebenezer C. Richardson, who lived here with his four wives and 12 children. It has been listed on the National Register of Historic Places since August 9, 1982.

The house is unusual for its saltbox form. It has one large room on its second story, above the front rooms of the first floor. Extending back from the roof ridge in one long sweep is a shed roof of the New England "saltbox" type. The house is one of only four in Utah having that roof shape. The others are the Joseph Beesley house in Provo (which has been significantly modified), the Lauritz Smith House in Draper (NRHP-listed), and the Hampton's Ford Stage Station in Collinston (NRHP-listed).
