= Hampton's Ford Stage Stop and Barn =

- U.S. National Register of Historic Places
- U.S. Historic district
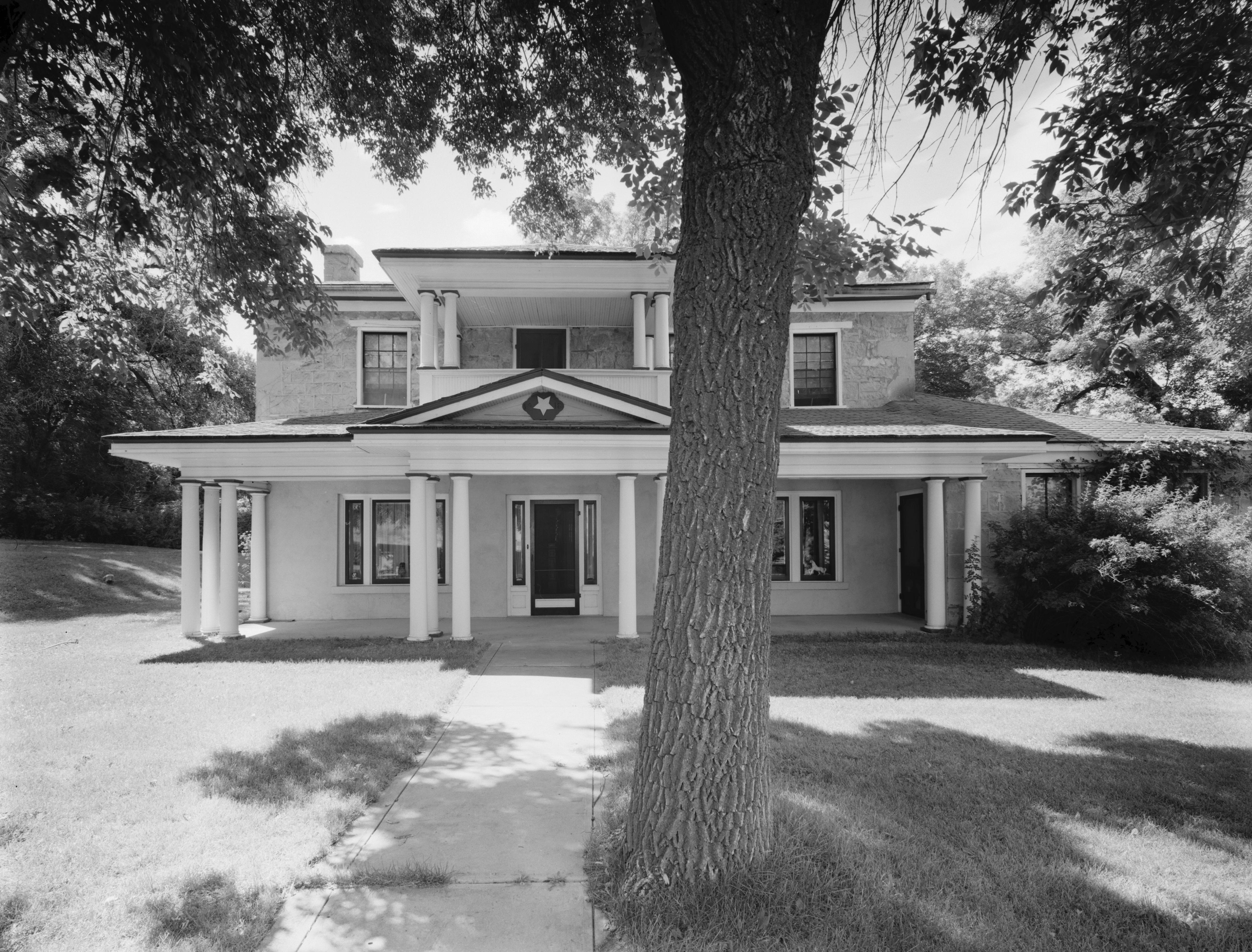
- Hampton's Ford Stage Stop in 1967; front view not revealing Saltbox roof extending to rear

- Location within Utah Location within the United States
- Location: Box Elder County, Utah; United States
- Nearest city: Collinston
- Coordinates: 41°47′14″N 112°6′18″W
- Area: 8 acres (3.2 ha)
- Built: 1867
- NRHP reference No.: 71000841
- Added to NRHP: August 12, 1971

The Hampton's Ford Stage Stop and Barn is a historic district in northeastern Box Elder, Utah, United States, (about 1 mile [1.6 km] northwest of the community of Collinston) that is listed on the National Register of Historic Places.

== Description ==
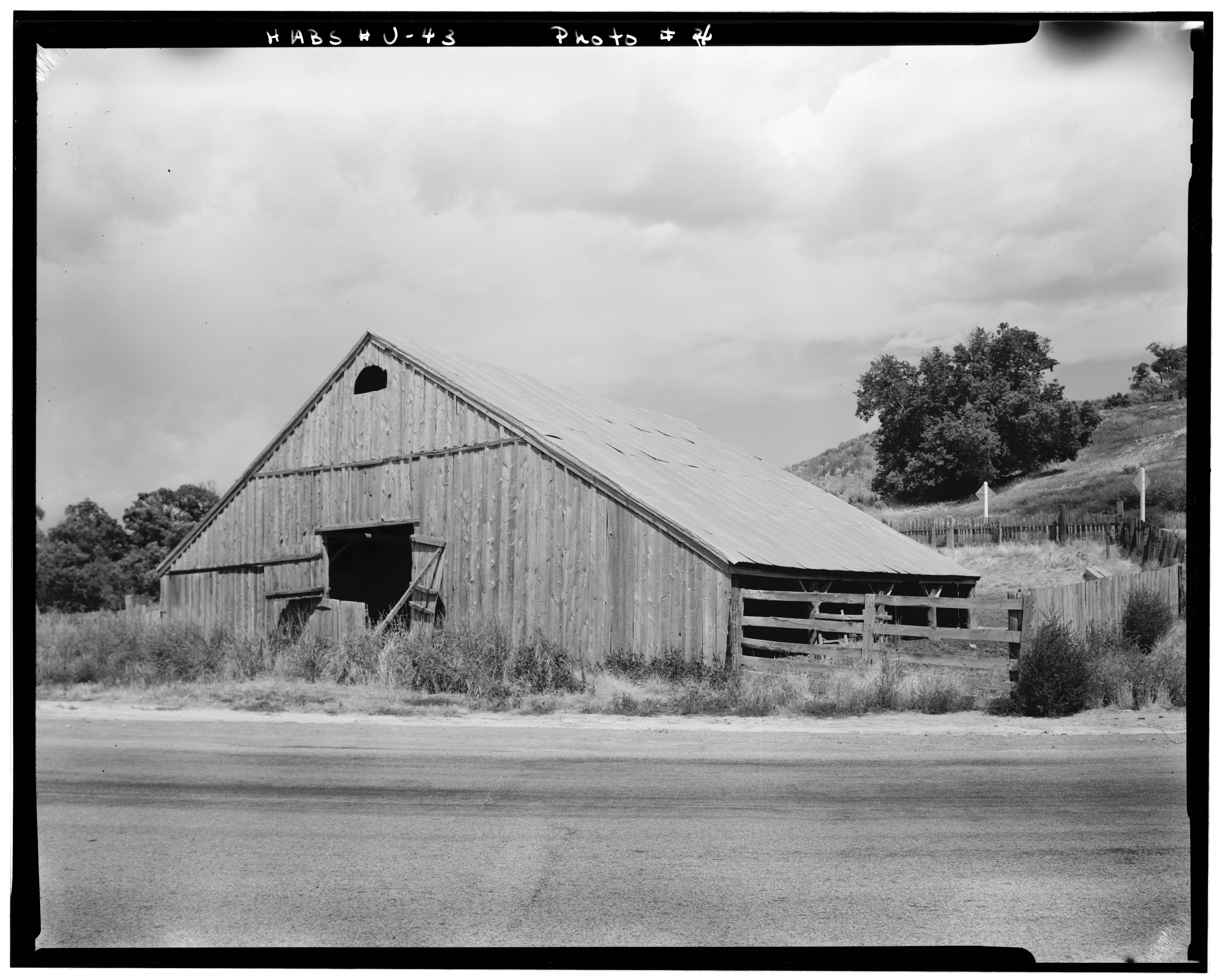
Barn at Hampton's Ford Stage Stop in 1967

The stage stop was established at a ford on the Bear River by Benjamin Y. Hampton and William S. Godbe in 1853. The pair operated a ferry until 1859 when they built a bridge, replacing it in 1866. At about the same time they built a house, which also served as a hotel, and a barn. The bridge was again replaced in 1892, and superseded by a bridge on Utah State Route 30.

The main building is a two-story red-tinted limestone structure. The hotel originally boasted ten rooms and an indoor privy. There were eight rooms on the ground floor, including a living area, dining room, kitchen and bedrooms. The large existing porch was added in 1918.

The house is unusual as one of only four known historic Saltbox-style buildings in Utah. The other three are the Lauritz Smith House (NRHP-listed) in Draper, the William D. Skeen House (NRHP-listed) in Plain City, and the Joseph Beesley House in Provo (which has been significantly modified). As can be seen in photos accompanying the NRHP nomination, the house's rear is extended out under a long shed roof.

The wood barn is located across the road, in substantially the same configuration as it was originally built.

Hampton's Ford Stage Stop was added to the National Register of Historic Places on August 12, 1971.

== See also ==
- National Register of Historic Places listings in Box Elder County, Utah
