= First National Bank South Dakota =

- Founded: October 5, 1962; 63 years ago
- Defunct: July 28, 2014; 12 years ago
- Headquarters: Yankton, South Dakota

First National Bank South Dakota was a bank headquartered in Yankton, South Dakota. In 2014, its charter was consolidated with that of its affiliate, First National Bank of Omaha.

== History ==
The bank was established 1962 as Valley State Bank. Its name was changed on July 19, 1994. The name change triggered a trademark lawsuit, First National Bank, in Sioux Falls v. First National Bank, South Dakota, that is quoted as an example of weakness of the "likelihood of confusion" argument in the trademark disputes: while the Sioux Falls bank prevailed, with courts finding that the South Dakota bank was indeed targeting the competitor's customers, and its ads in the newspaper were misleading, the injunction (prohibition of using the brand within the 10-mile distance from the headquarters of First National Bank in Sioux Falls) was very weak.

In 1999, it acquired Commercial Trust And Savings Bank of Mitchell, South Dakota, which had 5 branches.

In 2014, its charter was consolidated with that of its affiliate, First National Bank of Omaha.
