= Laurits =

Male given name

Laurits is a masculine given name, a Danish and Estonian variant of the Scandinavian Lauritz, related to the English names Laurence and Lawrence. It may refer to:

- Laurits, fire god related to St. Lawrence in Estonian mythology

== Given name ==
- Hans Laurits Olsen Hammerstad (1840 – after 1877), Norwegian politician
- Laurits Grønland (1887–1957), Norwegian politician
- Laurits Hansen (1894–1965), Danish trade unionist and politician
- Laurits Jørgensen (1896 – after 1920), Danish track and field athlete who competed in the 1920 Summer Olympics
- Laurits Larsen (1872–1949), Danish sport shooter who competed in the 1912 and 1920 Summer Olympics
- Laurits Munch-Petersen (born 1973), Danish film director
- Laurits Andersen Ring (1854–1933), Danish painter known as L. A. Ring
- Laurits S. Swenson (1865–1947), American diplomat
- Laurits Tuxen (1853–1927), Danish painter and sculptor
- Niels Laurits Høyen (1798–1870), Danish art historian and critic

== Surname ==
- Peeter Laurits (born 1962), Estonian artist
- Taavi Laurits (born 1990), Estonian footballer (:et)

== See also ==
- Lauritz (disambiguation)
