= First National Business Park =

Coordinates: 41°15′54″N 96°08′02″W

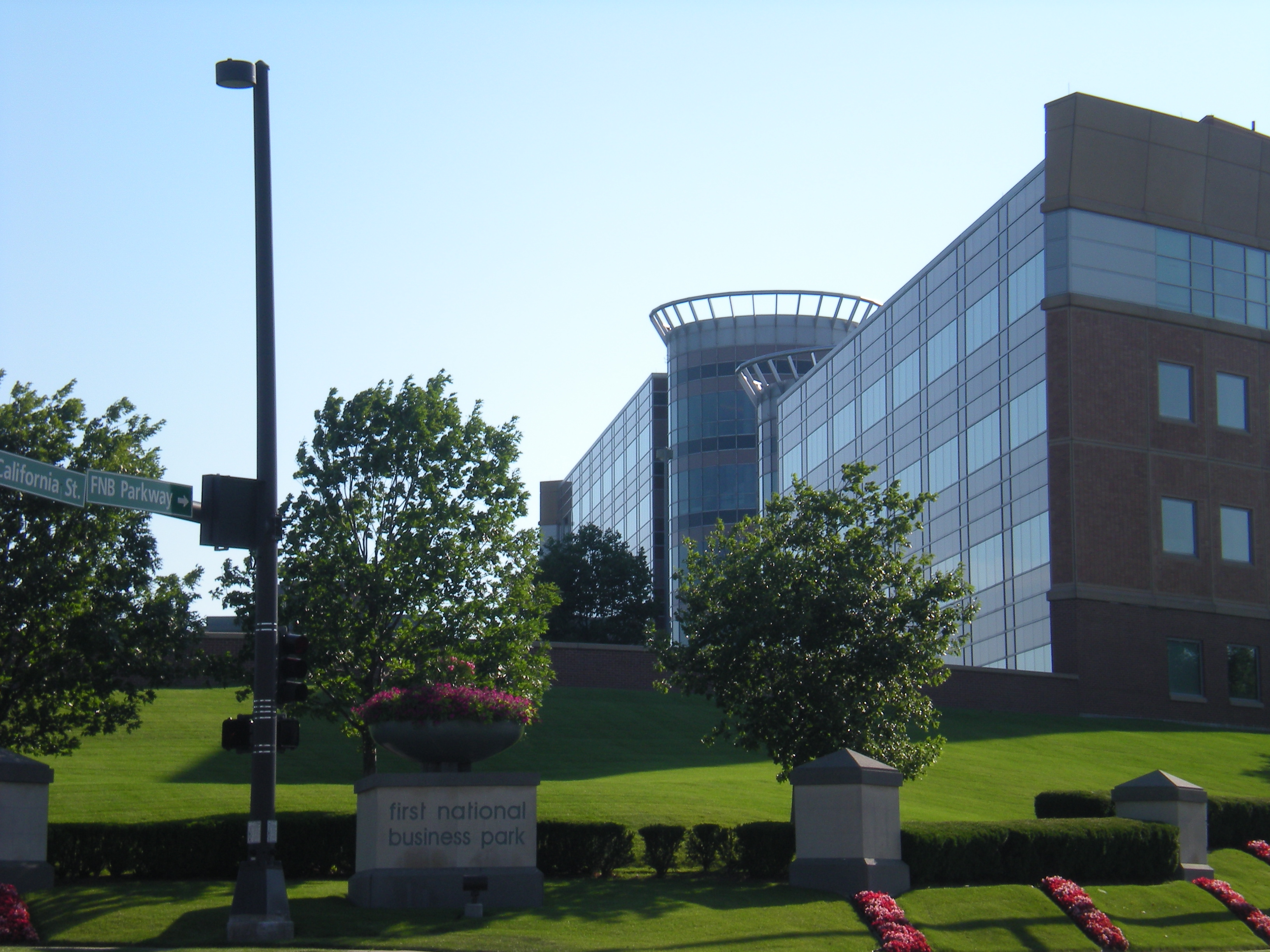
- Interactive map of First National Business Park
- Established: 1997

First National Business Park is located at 144th & Dodge Streets, just north of Boys Town in West Omaha. CB Richard Ellis regards the park as Omaha's "most prestigious location". It was a significant part of the largest annexation in Omaha's history, which former mayor Hal Daub called for in 1999.

Founded in 1997, the 80-acre (32 ha) business park is notable as one of the most desirable locations for business parks in the Midwestern United States. The Park had its last building commitment within a year of its founding. The park includes a 250,000-square-foot (23,000 m^{2}) building finished in 1998, the Empire Fire and Marine Insurance building of 135,000 square feet (12,500 m^{2}), a third building of 70,000-square-foot (6,500 m^{2}) building, and a 65,000-square-foot (6,000 m^{2}) building. Harlan Noddle, a past chairman of the University of Nebraska Foundation and a prominent Omaha businessman, was involved in building the park.

It was announced on October 23, 2008 that Yahoo will be coming to the Omaha Metro Area. Yahoo stated that the First National Business Park will be the home to the customer care center that would open the following April.

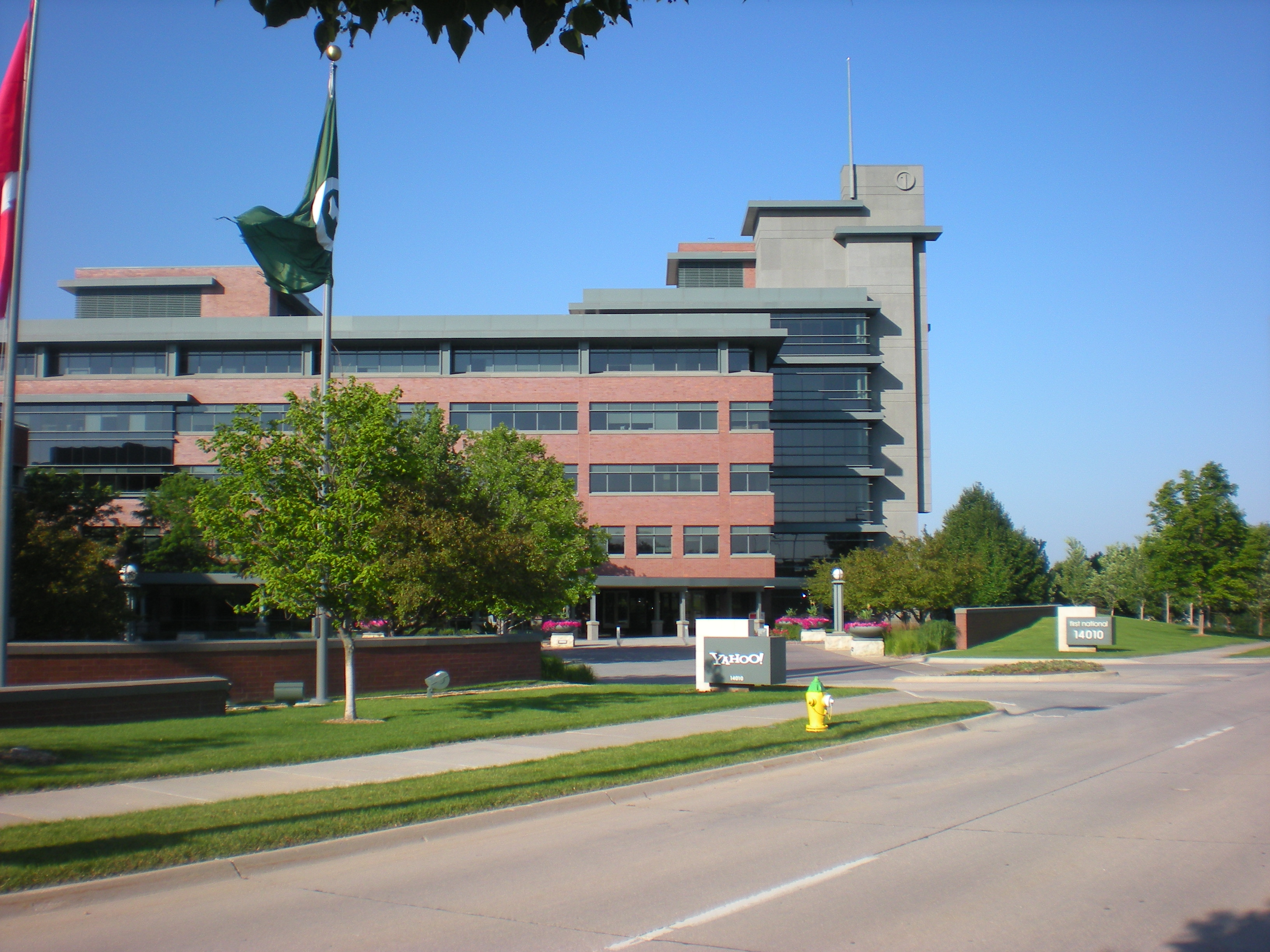
Yahoo offices in the First National Business Park.

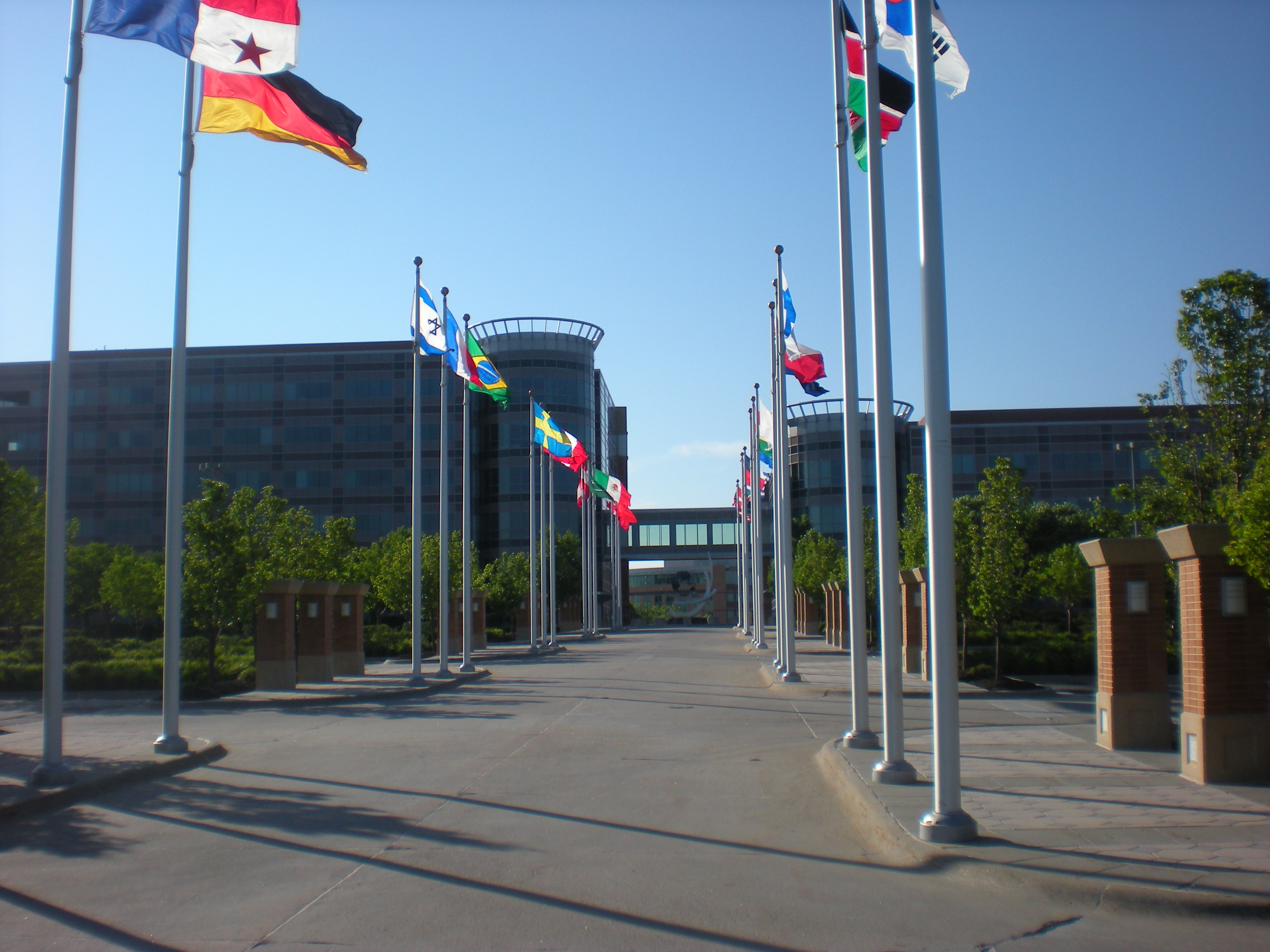
Additional buildings located in the business park.

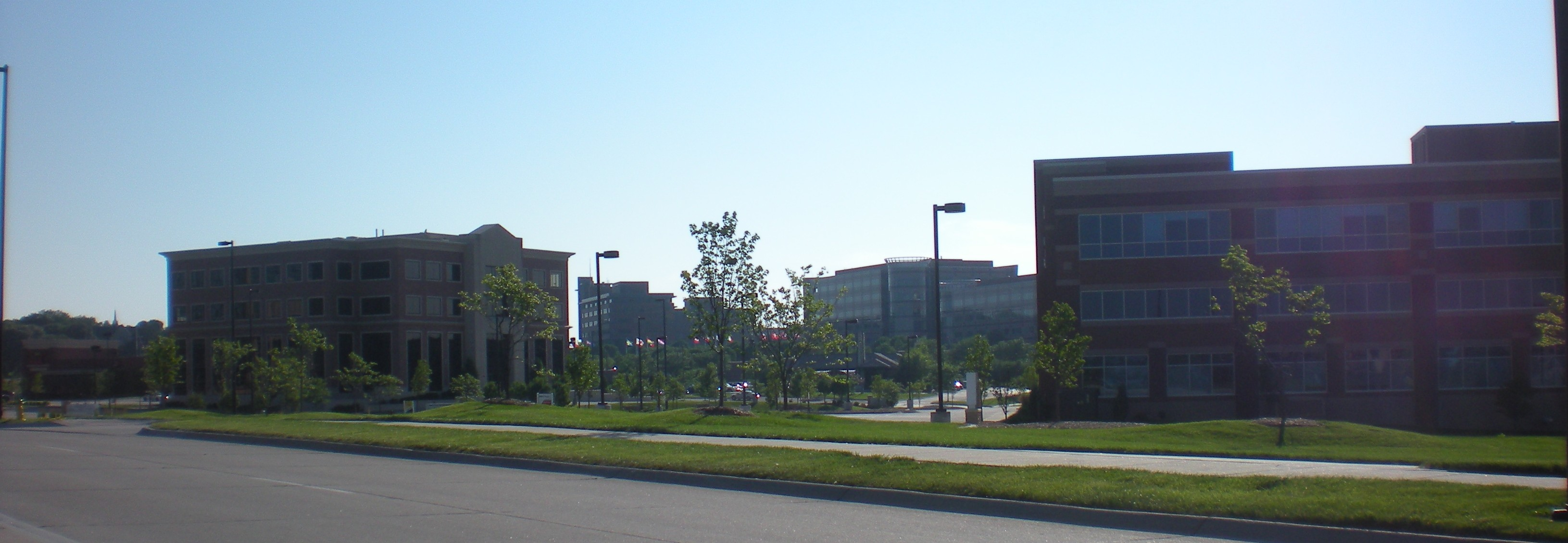
View of a section of the business park, looking west.

== See also ==
- Economy of Omaha, Nebraska
- First National Bank of Omaha
