= Lauritz Smith House =

Historic house in Draper, Utah, United States

- U.S. National Register of Historic Places
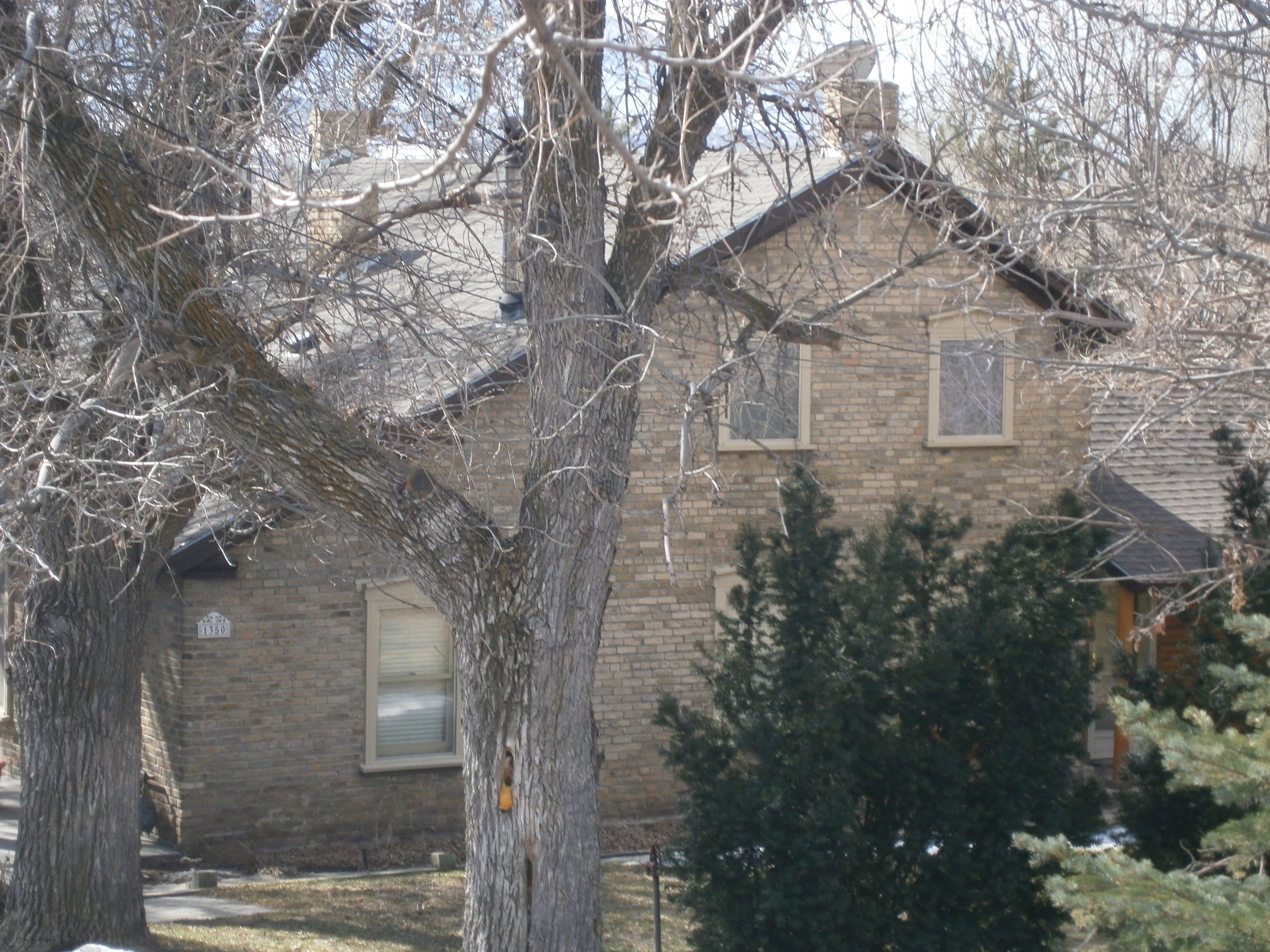
- Lauritz Smith House, March 2013

- Location within Utah Location within the United States
- Location: 1350 East 12400 South; Draper, Utah; United States
- Coordinates: 40°31′29″N 111°51′2″W
- Area: less than one acre
- Built: c. 1865
- Built by: Lauritz Smith
- Architectural style: Modified Saltbox
- NRHP reference No.: 83003179
- Added to NRHP: June 24, 1983

The Lauritz Smith House is a historic house in Draper, Utah, United States, that is listed on the National Register of Historic Places (NRHP).

== Description ==
The house is located at 1350 Eest 12400 South and was built c. 1865.

It is "architecturally important because it represents a rare example of the New England 'Saltbox' house in Utah." Saltbox architecture is relatively common in the U.S. northeast where Mormonism began, but is rare in Utah. The only other known examples at the time of NRHP nomination were the Joseph Beesley House in Provo (which has been significantly modified), the William Skeen House (NRHP-listed) in Plain City, and Hampton's Ford Stage Station (NRHP-listed) in Bear River.

According to the NRHP nomination:

The true saltbox house in New England is characterized by a massive central chimney as well as the shed-like outshut extending out to the rear from the two-story front section. As the type moved into the Midwest and then to Utah it gradually lost the central fireplace in favor of a central-hall and two gable-end chimneys. 2 The Lauritz Smith house in Draper, Utah, built in c.1865, is an example of this 'modified' Saltbox type."

The house was listed on the NRHP June 24, 1983.

== See also ==
- National Register of Historic Places listings in Salt Lake County, Utah
- Lauritz H. and Emma Smith House, Draper, also NRHP-listed in Draper.
