= Lauritzen Canal =

Coordinates: 37.921492°N 122.367213°W

The Lauritzen Canal is a shipping waterway which is part of the larger Port of Richmond in Richmond, California. It was dredged out of the former expanse of the now atrophied Castro Cove wetlands of the West Richmond Watershed. It was created for shipbuilding yards in World War II. Today is serves as part of the operation of the Port of Richmond for largely petrochemical, liquid bulk, and vehicle imports.

The California Office of Environmental Health Hazard Assessment has issued a "DO NOT EAT" warning for any fish and shellfish caught in the Lauritzen Channel due to elevated levels of dieldrin and DDTs.
