= The Super Servant Two =

Lauritzen A.S v Wijsmuller B.V, (The Super Servant Two)
- Court: Court of Appeal
- Full case name: J. Lauritzen A/S v Wijsmuller BV
- Citation: [1990] 1 Lloyd's Rep 1

Court membership
- Judges sitting: Lord Dillon, Lord Bingham

Keywords
- Frustration

J. Lauritzen A.S. v Wijsmuller B.V, (The Super Servant Two) [1990] 1 Lloyd's Rep 1 more commonly known as The Super Servant Two was a Court of Appeal case in English contract law. The case is one of the leading case law authorities relating to frustration of contract in English contract law.

== Facts ==
The claimants in the case, J. Lauritzen A/S, were the owners of an oil drilling rig that the defendants Wijsmuller had agreed to transport from Japan to Rotterdam. Under the terms of the contract the defendants were able to transport the oil rig using one of either two ships known as The Super Servant One or the Super Servant Two. The defendants decided to use the second ship as the first ship was being used for other contracts. However, in July 1981 the Super Servant Two was sunk in Zaire (now the Democratic Republic of Congo) while transporting another rig. The defendants argued that the contract has been frustrated as they were incapable of transporting the drilling rig and the claimants argued that the impossibility of performing the contract had been self-induced and that therefore they should not be discharged of the need to perform the contract.

== Judgment ==
The Court of Appeal ruled that the defendants could not rely on the doctrine of frustration and that the defendants would have to bear the additional costs of transporting the rig.

== Criticism and academic reaction ==
A ruling has been described as "a harsh decision open to criticism".
