= First National Center (Omaha) =

High-rise in Omaha, Nebraska, U.S.

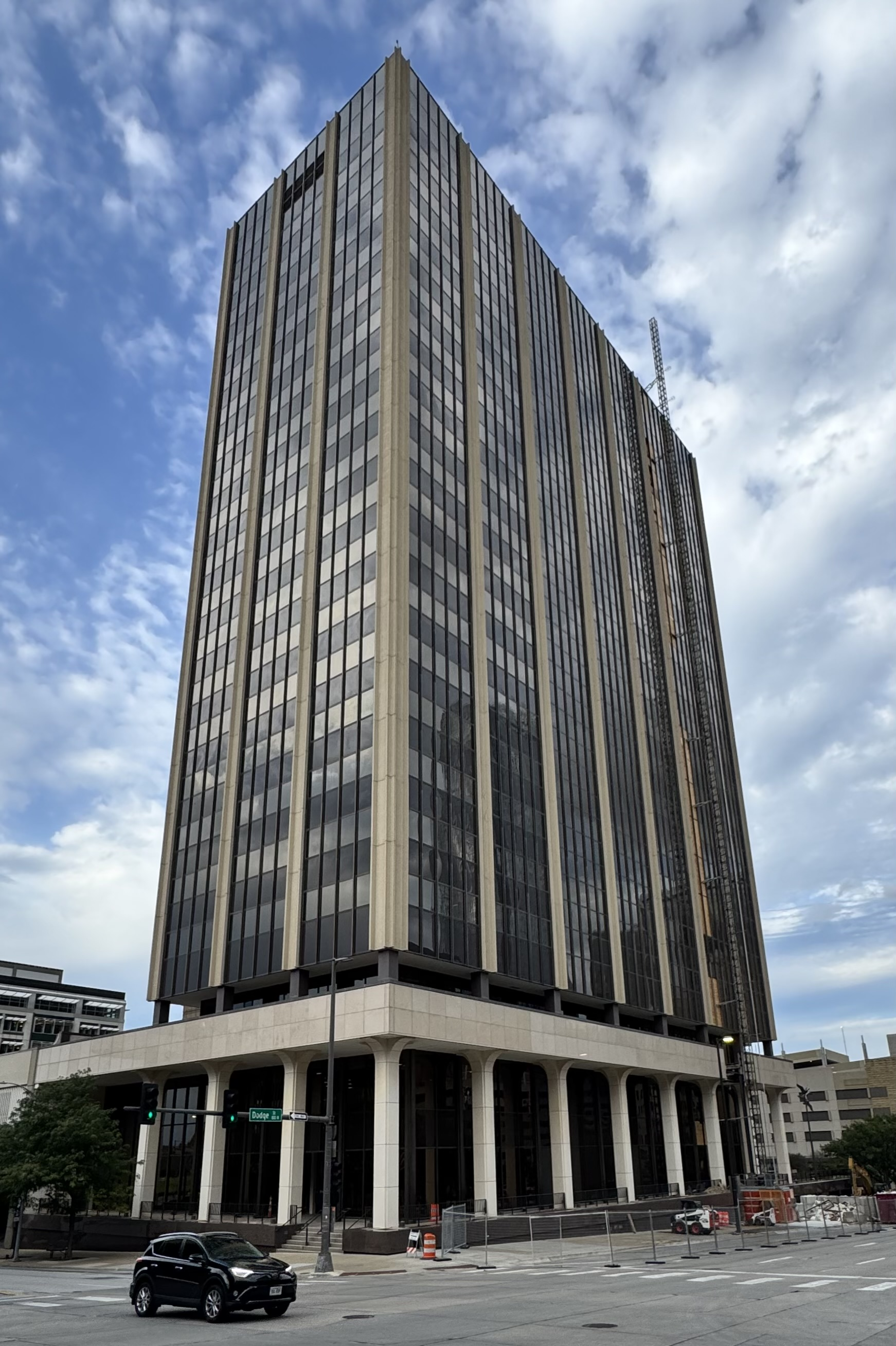
- First National Center in 2026
- Interactive map of the First National Center area

General information
- Status: Completed
- Location: Omaha, Nebraska, U.S.
- Coordinates: 41.2601°N 95.9379°W
- Groundbreaking: 1969
- Completed: 1971

Height
- Antenna spire: 383 ft (117 m)
- Roof: 295 ft (90 m)

Technical details
- Floor count: 22

Design and construction
- Main contractor: Kiewit Corporation

Other information
- Public transit: Metro Transit
- First National Center
- U.S. National Register of Historic Places
- Architect: Thomas Stanley
- Architectural style: Modern Movement
- NRHP reference No.: 100010948
- Added to NRHP: July 7, 2025

First National Center is a high-rise office building located at 1620 Dodge Street in Downtown Omaha, Nebraska, United States. It has 22 stories, making it one of the tallest buildings in the city of Omaha. Opened in 1971, First National Center served as the headquarters of First National Bank of Omaha until the completion of First National Bank Tower in 2002. The building is attached to a 19-story, 420-room Doubletree hotel and a 550-stall parking garage. It was listed on the National Register of Historic Places in 2025.

== History ==
First National Center was announced in November 1967 as a part of a major commercial complex built on the site of the former Omaha Post office. The high-rise was built alongside a Hilton Hotel. The office building was built for First National Bank of Omaha as its new headquarters. The hotel began construction in 1968, while First National Center began construction in 1969. The Hilton Hotel was built with pre-cast concrete, while the office building was built with traditional steel.

First National Center opened alongside the Hilton Hotel in November 1971. Additionally, First National Bank of Omaha officially began occupying the building that same month. The bank and its parent company, First National of Nebraska, kept the building as its headquarters until the completion of First National Bank Tower in 2002. Both companies continued to operate inside of the building until 2024, when the building was sold to NuStyle and was converted into apartments. First National Center was listed on the National Register of Historic Places on July 7, 2025.

== Design ==
First National Center has 22 floors and has a roof height of 295 ft (90 m), and an antenna spire of 383 (117 m). It is encased by a glass facade with steel beams to the sides. Architecturally, the building belongs to the Modern Movement. The building was designed by Thomas Stanley and was built by Kiewit Corporation.

== Gallery ==
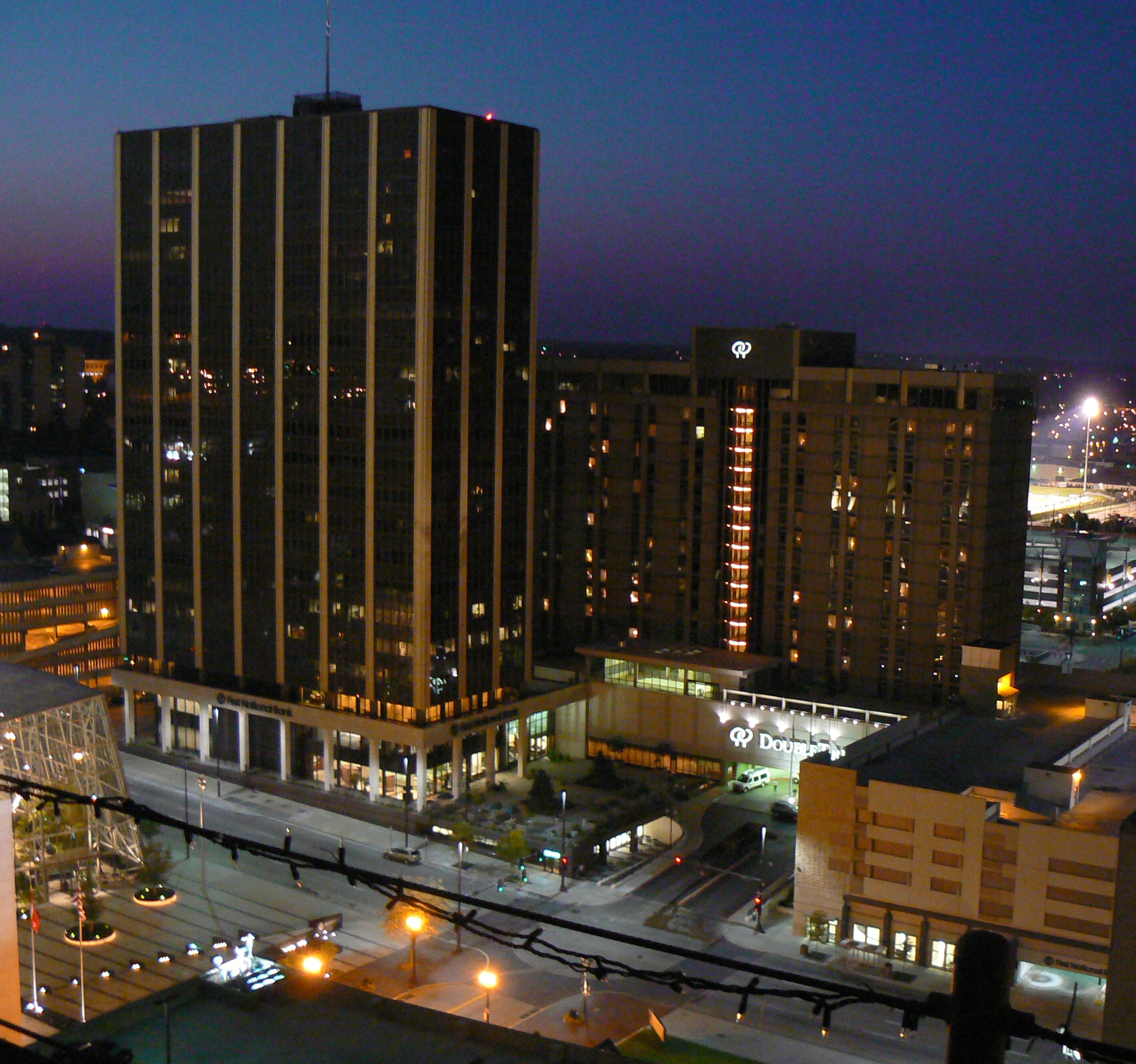
First National Center and the adjacent Doubletree Hotel at dusk

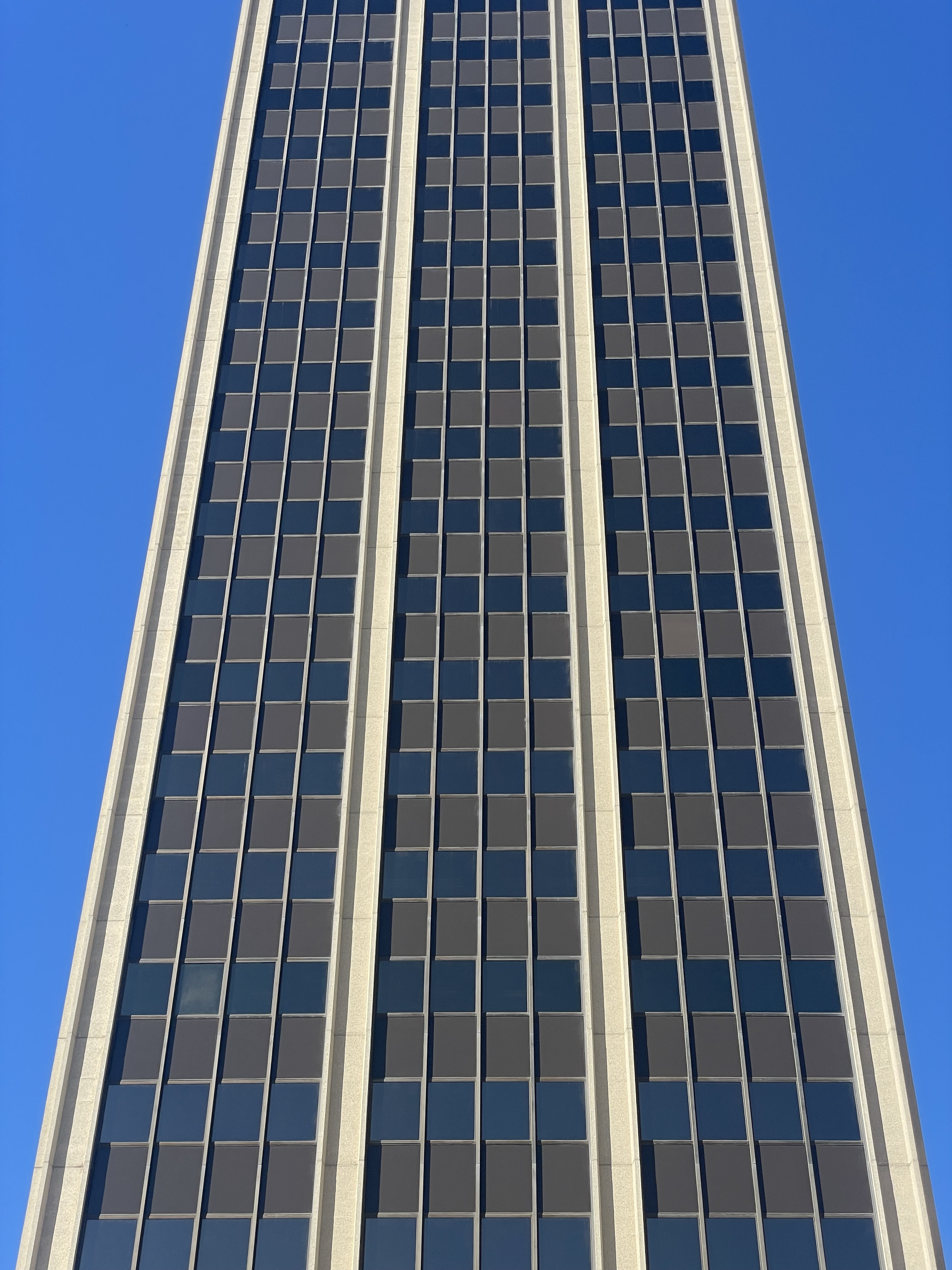
Eastern Facade

== See also ==
- Economy of Omaha, Nebraska
- List of tallest buildings in Omaha, Nebraska
- First National Bank of Omaha
