= Ritzen =

Ritzen is a surname. Notable people with the surname include:

- Henri Ritzen (1892–1976), Dutch painter
- Jo Ritzen (born 1945), Dutch economist and social-democratic politician
- Peter Ritzen (born 1956), Flemish pianist composer and conductor
- Per-Erik Ritzén (born 1934), Swedish modern pentathlete
- Pierre Debray-Ritzen (1922–1993), French physician and psychiatrist
