= Lauritzen Gardens =

Botanical gardens and arboretum in Omaha, Nebraska, U.S.

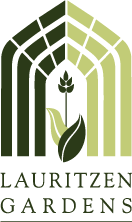
- Interactive map of Lauritzen Gardens
- Type: Private
- Location: South Omaha, Nebraska, U.S.
- Coordinates: 41.234397°N 95.916116°W
- Area: 100 acres (40 ha)
- Created: 1994
- Status: Open
- Website: Official website

Lauritzen Gardens are a botanical gardens and arboretum located at 100 Bancroft Street, South Omaha, Nebraska, United States. The gardens originally opened in 1994 as the Omaha Botanical Gardens. The visitors center opened in 2001 and the center rebranded to its current name. The center also includes the Marjorie K. Daugherty Conservatory, opened 2014, and Sofia's Play Garden, opened 2025. The gardens are open daily during business hours; an admission fee is charged.

== History ==
Plans to open a botanical center in Omaha were first proposed in the early 1970s. The proposed botanical center never made it to construction and was cancelled. In 1982, following the Des Moines Botanical Center's opening, Omaha Botanical Center Inc. announced the development of a similar development. It wasn't until 1988 that concrete plans were announced for the botanical gardens.

While the center was offered land from Union Pacific on its former shops area, developers instead chose a site closer to the Henry Doorly Zoo. The site was a former garbage dump, which was cleared in 1981. The botanical center encountered several delays. While planting was intended to start in 1989, it wasn't until 1993 that the center began planting. It opened in April 1994 as Omaha Botanical Gardens.

In March 2000, a $16 million visitor's and education center was announced. Designed by HDR and Christner, the building would be 32,000-square-foot (3,000 m^{2}) large. The building included a Floral Display Hall for year-round seasonal displays, a gift shop, a cafe, and a special events center. The center officially opened in 2001. That same year, the center changed its name to Lauritzen Gardens, named for the Lauritzen Family.

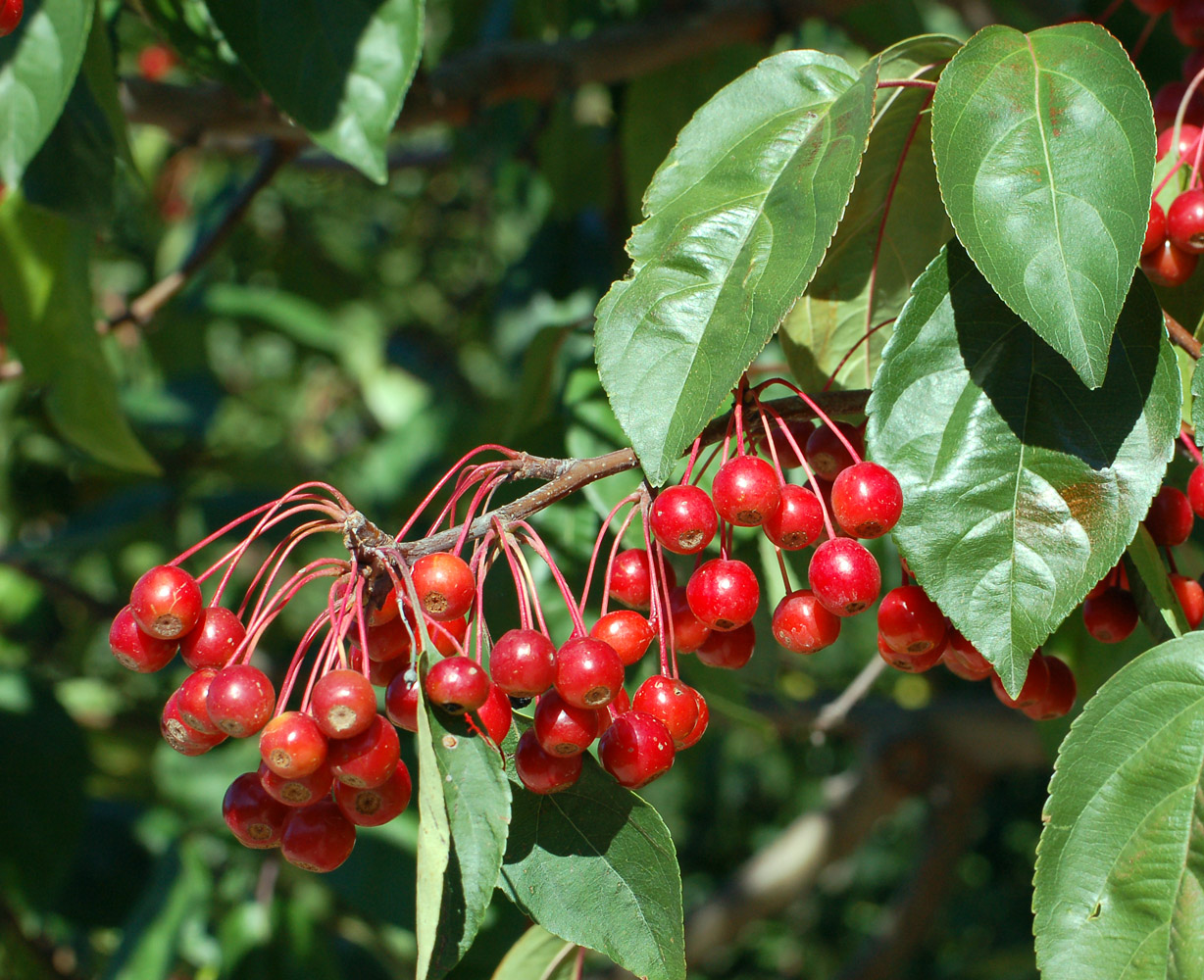
Ripe crab apple fruit at the gardens.

The model railroad garden opened in 2007. The Marjorie K. Daugherty Conservatory, a $20 million greenhouse addition, opened in 2014. The conservatory is a glass building that is 17,000 square feet (1,600 m^{2}) large. In 2025, Lauritzen Gardens opened Sofia's Play Garden, a playground located to the north of the visitors center. That same year, the Daugherty Conservatory underwent renovations.

== Design ==
Lauritzen Gardens has a total area of 100 acres (40 ha) and is named for the Lauritzen Family. The gardens have two buildings, the visitor center and the Marjorie K. Daugherty Conservatory. The visitors center includes 32,000-square-foot (3,000 m^{2}) of space and the conservatory includes 17,000 square feet (1,600 m^{2}) of space. Also included is Sofia's Play Garden, located North of the visitors center, and a model railroad garden.

== See also ==
- List of botanical gardens in the United States
- Lauritzen Corporation
- Kenefick Park
