= Lauritz H. and Emma Smith House =

Historic house in Draper, Utah, United States

- U.S. National Register of Historic Places
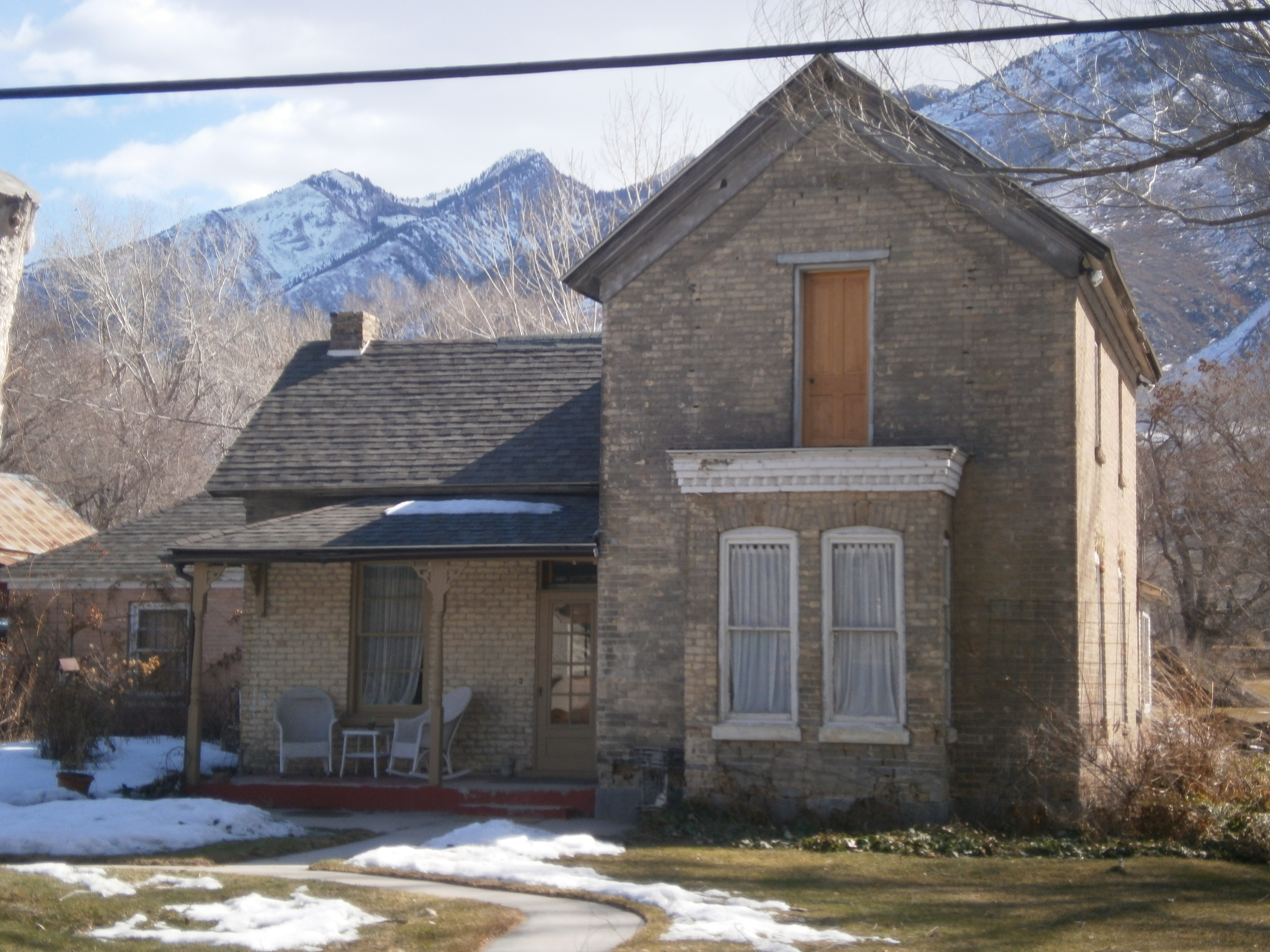
- Lauritz H. and Emma Smith House, March 2013

- Location within Utah Location within the United States
- Location: 12423 South Relation Street; Draper, Utah; United States
- Coordinates: 40°31′32″N 111°50′48″W
- Area: 0.4 acres (0.16 ha)
- Built: 1884-1947
- Built by: Smith, Lauritz H.; Jones, Charles H.
- Architectural style: Late Victorian, Cross Wing
- MPS: Draper, Utah MPS
- NRHP reference No.: 05001633
- Added to NRHP: February 1, 2006

The Lauritz H. and Emma Smith House is a historic house in Draper, Utah, >United States, that is listed on the National Register of Historic Places (NRHP).

== Description ==
The house is located at 12423 South Relation Street and was built in stages from 1884 to 1947. It has also been known as the Robert L. and Doris B. Smith House.

It was owned and mostly built by Lauritz Heber Smith, son of Lauritz Smith, who was one of the earliest settlers of Draper. It is historic for its association with the Smith family and has good integrity of its many stages of development. It has two outbuildings, one being a c.1885 stone granary.

It was listed on the NRHP February 1, 2006.

== See also ==
- National Register of Historic Places listings in Salt Lake County, Utah
- Rinckel Mansion, Carson City, Nevada, another NRHP-listed work by Charles H. Jones
- Lauritz Smith House, Draper, also NRHP-listed
