= Gresham, Nebraska =

Village in York County, Nebraska, United States

- Village
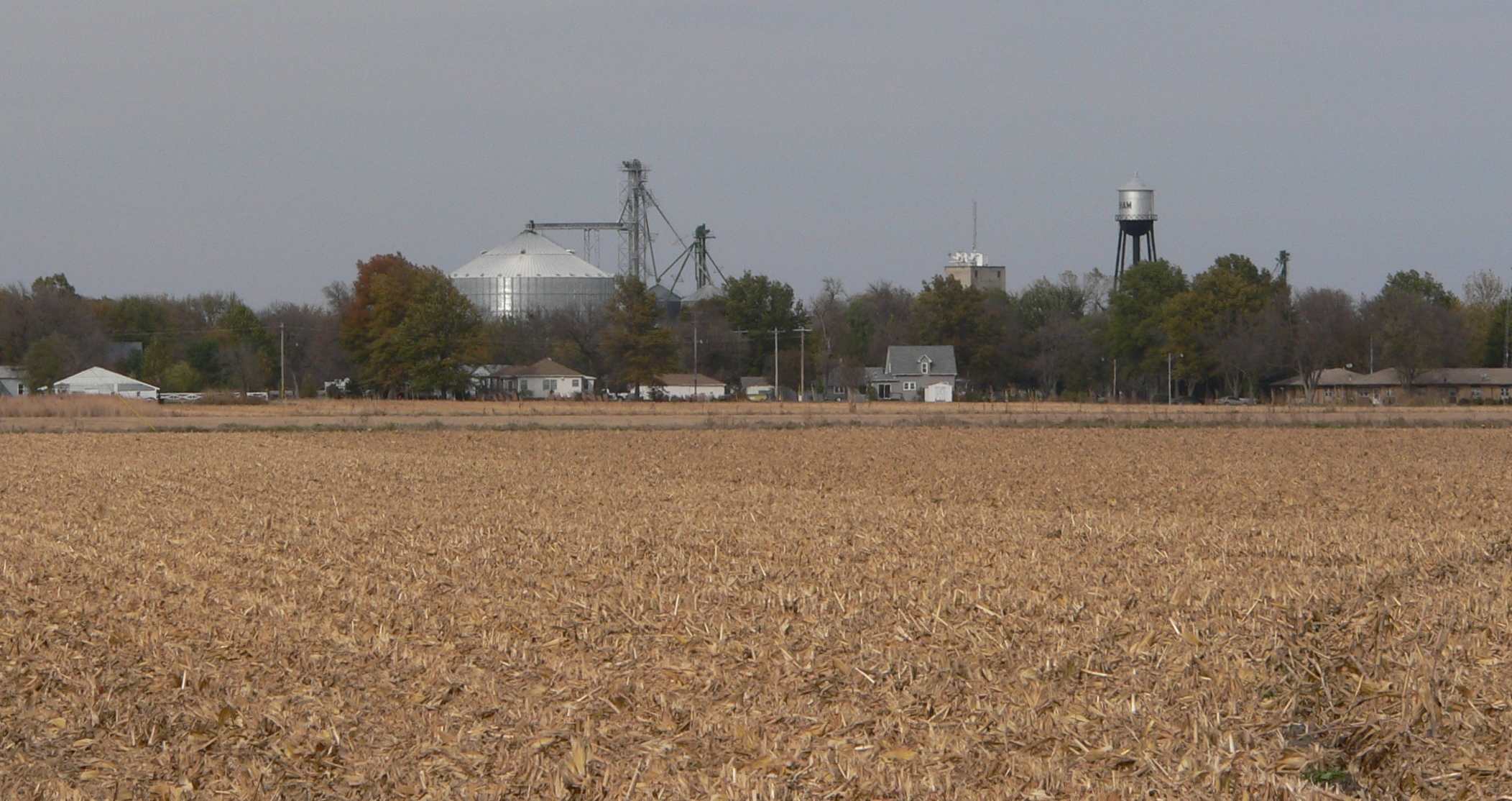
- Gresham, seen from the south along Nebraska Highway 69, October 2011

- Location of Gresham, Nebraska
- Coordinates: 41°01′42″N 97°24′04″W
- Country: United States
- State: Nebraska
- County: York

Area
  - Total: 0.27 sq mi (0.70 km^{2})
  - Land: 0.27 sq mi (0.70 km^{2})
  - Water: 0 sq mi (0.00 km^{2})
- Elevation: 1,614 ft (492 m)

Population (2020)
  - Total: 219
  - Density: 814.7/sq mi (314.56/km^{2})
- Time zone: UTC-6 (Central (CST))
  - Summer (DST): UTC-5 (CDT)
- ZIP code: 68367
- Area code: 402
- FIPS code: 31-20225
- GNIS feature ID: 2398209

Gresham is a village in York County, Nebraska, United States. As of the 2020 census, Gresham had a population of 219.

== History ==
Gresham was originally called Poston, and under the latter name was platted in 1887 when the Fremont, Elkhorn and Missouri Valley Railroad was extended to that point. When it was discovered there was another place in the state with the name Poston, the town was renamed in honor of Walter Q. Gresham, Secretary of State of the United States.

== Geography ==
According to the United States Census Bureau, the village has a total area of 0.27 square miles (0.70 km^{2}), all land.

== Demographics ==
Historical population
Census	Pop.	Note	%±
1900	297		—
1910	344		15.8%
1920	492		43.0%
1930	442		−10.2%
1940	352		−20.4%
1950	267		−24.1%
1960	239		−10.5%
1970	248		3.8%
1980	320		29.0%
1990	253		−20.9%
2000	270		6.7%
2010	223		−17.4%
2020	219		−1.8%
U.S. Decennial Census

=== 2010 census ===
As of the census of 2010, there were 223 people, 94 households, and 59 families residing in the village. The population density was 825.9 inhabitants per square mile (318.9/km^{2}). There were 125 housing units at an average density of 463.0 per square mile (178.8/km^{2}). The racial makeup of the village was 97.8% White, 0.4% African American, 0.4% Native American, and 1.3% from two or more races.

There were 94 households, of which 30.9% had children under the age of 18 living with them, 45.7% were married couples living together, 8.5% had a female householder with no husband present, 8.5% had a male householder with no wife present, and 37.2% were non-families. 34.0% of all households were made up of individuals, and 13.8% had someone living alone who was 65 years of age or older. The average household size was 2.37 and the average family size was 3.03.

The median age in the village was 41.5 years. 28.3% of residents were under the age of 18; 6.2% were between the ages of 18 and 24; 21% were from 25 to 44; 29.6% were from 45 to 64; and 14.8% were 65 years of age or older. The gender makeup of the village was 52.0% male and 48.0% female.

=== 2000 census ===
As of the census of 2000, there were 270 people, 113 households, and 71 families residing in the village. The population density was 1,011.9 inhabitants per square mile (390.7/km^{2}). There were 135 housing units at an average density of 505.9 per square mile (195.3/km^{2}). The racial makeup of the village was 99.63% White and 0.37% Native American.

There were 113 households, out of which 31.9% had children under the age of 18 living with them, 57.5% were married couples living together, 4.4% had a female householder with no husband present, and 36.3% were non-families. 32.7% of all households were made up of individuals, and 18.6% had someone living alone who was 65 years of age or older. The average household size was 2.39 and the average family size was 3.08.

In the village, the population was spread out, with 28.1% under the age of 18, 4.8% from 18 to 24, 31.9% from 25 to 44, 14.8% from 45 to 64, and 20.4% who were 65 years of age or older. The median age was 39 years. For every 100 females, there were 95.7 males. For every 100 females age 18 and over, there were 88.3 males.

As of 2000 the median income for a household in the village was $29,643, and the median income for a family was $36,563. Males had a median income of $28,333 versus $17,321 for females. The per capita income for the village was $18,141. About 8.5% of families and 13.3% of the population were below the poverty line, including 17.0% of those under the age of eighteen and 22.9% of those 65 or over.

== Notable residents ==
- William H. Diers (1890-1982), businessperson and politician, Speaker of the Nebraska Legislature 1939

== See also ==
- List of municipalities in Nebraska
