= Jan-Lauritz Opstad =

Norwegian museum director and art historian (1950–2018)

Jan-Lauritz Opstad (4 November 1950 – 21 November 2018) was a Norwegian museum director and art historian.

He was born in Sarpsborg, Norway as a son of Lauritz Opstad (1917–2003). His father was director of the Norwegian Museum of Decorative Arts and Design.

Opstad had a master's degree in art history from the University of Oslo in 1978 with an assignment on Norwegian enamel art 1880–1914. In 1979, he was hired as director of the Nordenfjeld Art Museum (Nordenfjeldske Kunstindustrimuseum) in Trondheim, a position he held until 2013. His special field is enameling history, and important books include Norsk emalje: Kunsthåndverk i verdenstoppen (1994).

== Selected works ==
- Norsk art nouveau (1979)
- Ny norsk gullsmedkunst (1983)
- En ny bevissthet : norsk kunsthåndverk 1970-1990 (1989)
- Norsk emalje : kunsthåndverk i verdenstoppen (1994)
- Paa Trondhjemsk vis : selskapskultur og skjulte matskatter fra 1700 til 1900 (2003)
