= Lauritz Opstad =

Norwegian art historian

Jens Lauritz Opstad (5 May 1917 – 23 May 2003) was a Norwegian museum director and historian.

He was born in Tune as a son of wholesaler Jens Lauritzen Opstad (1884–1963) and Laura Kristine Thune (1885–1921). He finished his secondary education in Sarpsborg in 1937 and at the University of Oslo he took the cand.mag. degree in 1941 and the cand.philol. degree in history in 1943.

He was a school teacher in Fredrikstad from 1944 to 1945, then a consultant for half a year at the Norwegian Museum of Decorative Arts and Design. He was a curator at Stavanger Museum/Ledaal from 1947 to 1948, county curator in Østfold County Municipality from 1948 to 1967 and director of the Norwegian Museum of Decorative Arts and Design from 1967 to 1987. Important books include Moss Jernverk (1950), Herrebøe Fajance Fabrique (1959), Bygdehistorien inntil 1800 (volume two of Rygge, 1957) and Norsk pottemakeri 1600–1900 (1990).

He was decorated as a Knight, First Class of the Royal Norwegian Order of St. Olav (1976), Knight of the Order of the Lion of Finland, Commander of the Order of the Dannebrog and Order of the Polar Star.

In October 1947 he married Marit Elisabeth Olstad. In 1950 they had the son Jan-Lauritz Opstad, a museum director. Lauritz Opstad died in June 2010 in Oslo.
