= First National Bank of Omaha =

American bank and insurance company

First National Bank Omaha
- Type: Subsidiary
- Industry: Finance and Insurance
- Founded: December 10, 1857 (as Kountze Brothers Bank); July 1, 1865 (First National Bank Omaha)
- Headquarters: First National Bank Tower; Omaha, Nebraska, United States
- Key people: Clark Lauritzen (president)
- Products: Financial services
- Total assets: $34.73 billion (2026)
- Parent: First National of Nebraska
- Website: www.fnbo.com

First National Bank Omaha (FNBO) is a bank headquartered in Omaha, Nebraska, United States. It is a subsidiary of First National of Nebraska, Inc., a bank holding company under the control of the Lauritzen family. One of the largest banks in the United States, it is the oldest national bank headquartered west of the Missouri River.

The bank provides corporate banking, investment banking, retail banking, wealth management and consumer lending services and operates 120 branches in 8 states in the Midwestern United States. It also operates FNBO Direct, a direct bank. The bank is one of the largest issuers of credit cards, issuing cards under affinity programs with Amtrak, Major League Lacrosse, World of Warcraft, and Scheels All Sports.

== History ==
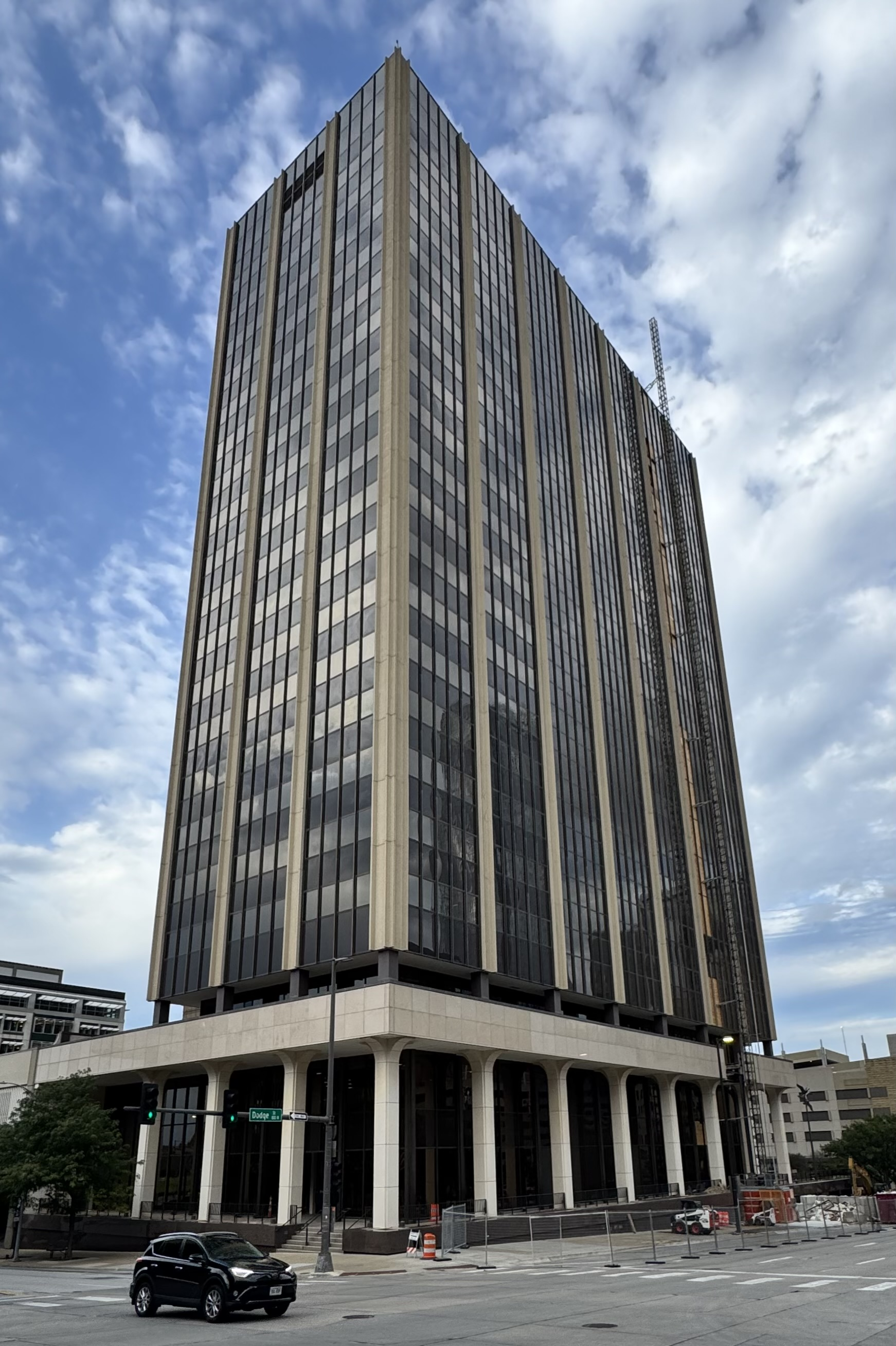
First National Bank of Omaha's former headquarters, First National Center, completed in 1971

Two immigrant brothers from Ohio, Herman Kountze and Augustus Kountze, founded the bank as Kountze Brothers Bank in 1857. It traded primarily in gold dust and bison hides. The bank received national charter #209 in 1863 and began doing business as First National Bank of Omaha. It brought in additional investors, including Edward Creighton, who served as president.

In 1953, under the leadership of John Lauritzen, First National Bank became the first bank in the region and the fifth in the nation to issue credit cards.

In 1968, due to an investment in real estate not permitted under a straight banking charter, the bank reorganized as a subsidiary of the bank holding company, First National of Nebraska, Inc.

In 1971, employees started moving into the 22-story First National Center. Attached to a 420-room hotel and a 550-stall parking garage, it became one of the most modern buildings in the region, providing economic development in downtown Omaha.

In 1987, Bruce Lauritzen was named president of the bank.

In 2000, First National Bank designated two parcels of green space for the city of Omaha. They are the current sites of two sculpture parks called "Spirit of Nebraska's Wilderness" and "Pioneer Courage". Working in tandem, the two sculptures join to make one of the largest bronze sculptures in the world.

In 2002, First National Bank completed construction on the First National Bank Tower, the tallest building between Chicago and Denver.

From 2006 to 2009, Rajive Johri was president of the bank.

From 2009 to 2017, Dan O'Neil was president of the bank.

On September 30, 2010, the bank holding company, First National of Nebraska, consolidated its bank charters of First National Bank of Colorado, in Fort Collins, Colorado; First National Bank of Kansas, in Overland Park, Kansas; and Castle Bank, in DeKalb, Illinois, with its First National Bank of Omaha charter.

In 2010, the bank sold a 51% interest in its merchant acquiring business to TSYS for $150.5 million. TSYS acquired the remaining 49% of the business the following year.

In 2014, the bank holding company consolidated the charter of First National Bank South Dakota with the charter of First National Bank of Omaha.

In 2017, Clark Lauritzen was named president of the bank.

In 2018, the bank ended its credit card affinity program with the National Rifle Association of America (NRA) due to customer complaints after the Parkland high school shooting.

In 2020, the bank changed its branding to FNBO from First National Bank of Omaha.

=== Acquisition history ===
#	Year	Company	Ref(s).
1	1984	David City Bank	
2	1988	First Security Bank & Trust Co.	
3	1989	First of Omaha Savings Co.	
4	2000	First State Bank	
5	2008	Mills County Bank	
6	2010	Infibank	
7	2022	Western State Bank	
8	2022	SAF Holdings, LLC and its wholly owned subsidiary AmeriFirst Home Improvement Finance, LLC	
9	2025	Northland Capital Markets	
10	2025	Country Club Bank	

== Office locations ==
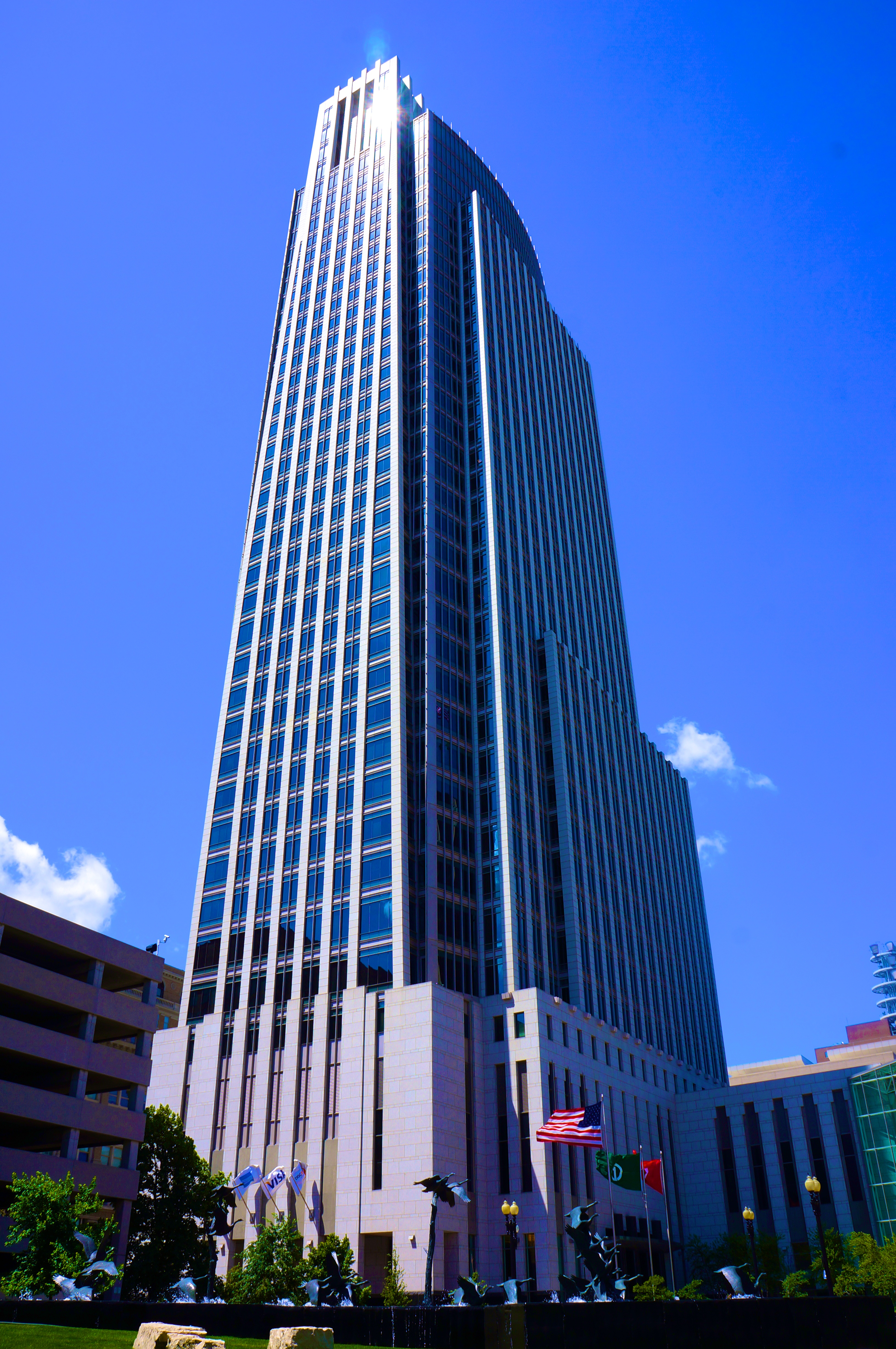
First National Bank Tower, the current headquarters of First National Bank of Omaha, completed in 2002

Notable office locations of FNBO include:

- First National Business Park
- First National Center
- First National Bank Tower

== Controversies and legal issues ==
=== Deceptive marketing of credit card add-on products ===
In August 2016, First National Bank of Omaha was disciplined for numerous deceptive marketing and unfair billing practices regarding credit card add-on products such as credit monitoring, identity theft monitoring, and debt relief products and services that they did not receive. The bank was ordered to provide $27.75 million in relief to roughly 257,000 consumers and a $4.5 million civil money penalty to the Consumer Financial Protection Bureau as well as a $3 million civil money penalty to the Office of the Comptroller of the Currency.

=== Interest rate lawsuit (1978) ===
In February 1969, Fred Fisher, a resident of Iowa, received an unsolicited BankAmericard from First National Bank Omaha charging an 18% interest rate, despite a legal maximum rate of 9% in Iowa. Fisher filed a suit against FNBO in 1971, which he won, albeit the case was appealed. At the same time, Marquette Bank Minneapolis sued FNBO for charging customers in Minnesota interest rates that were higher than the 12% legal limit in that state. The case was appealed to the United States Supreme Court, which maintained that the National Bank Act takes precedence over usury statutes in individual states and permitted a national bank to charge interest at the rate allowed by the regulations of the state in which such bank is located. In the aftermath of the decision, states loosened their anti-usury laws, allowing state-chartered banks to compete more equally with national banks. Some states, such as South Dakota eliminated anti-usury laws and were able to attract large banks to move their credit card operations to that state.

== See also ==
- Economy of Omaha, Nebraska
