= List of cemeteries in Utah =

This list of cemeteries in Utah includes currently operating, historical (closed for new interments), and defunct (graves abandoned or removed) cemeteries, columbaria, and mausolea. It does not include pet cemeteries.

== Beaver County ==
- Adamsville Cemetery, in Adamsville
- Beaver City Cemetery, in Beaver
- Frisco Cemetery, in Frisco
- Greenville Cemetery, in Greenville
- Milford Cemetery, in Milford
- Minersville Cemetery, in Minersville
- Mountain View Cemetery, in Beaver
- Squire Family Cemetery, 13 km from Newhouse

== Box Elder County ==
- Bear River City Cemetery, in Bear River
- Beaver Dam Cemetery, in Beaver Dam
- Bothwell Cemetery, in Bothwell
- Brigham City Cemetery, in Brigham City
- Call's Fort Cemetery, in Honeyville
- Clear Creek Cemetery, serving Naf, in Cassia County, Idaho
- Corinne Cemetery, in Corinne
- Deweyville Cemetery, in Deweyville
- Early Plymouth Cemetery, in Portage
- East Garland Cemetery, in Riverside
- Elwood Cemetery, in Elwood
- Fielding Cemetery, in Fielding
- Garland Cemetery, in Garland
- Grouse Creek Cemetery, in Grouse Creek
- Honeyville Cemetery
- Howell Cemetery, in Howell
- James Barnet Cole Burial Ground, in Plymouth
- Junction Cemetery, in Lynn
- Kelton Cemetery
- Kimber Ranch Burial
- Lynn Cemetery
- Mantua Cemetery, in Mantua
- Northwestern Shoshoni Tribal Cemetery, in Portage
- Park Valley Cemetery, in Park Valley
- Park Valley Pioneer Cemetery, in Park Valley
- Penrose Cemetery, in Penrose
- Perry Cemetery, in Perry
- Plymouth Cemetery, in Plymouth
- Portage Cemetery
- Riverside Cemetery
- Riverview Cemetery, in Tremonton
- Russian Settlement Cemetery, 11 km south of Park Valley
- Salt Creek Cemetery, SE of Bothwell
- Snowville Cemetery, in Snowville
- Terrace Cemetery, 14 km west of Matlin
- Tyrell Cabin Burials, 6 km north of Grouse Creek
- Valleyview Cemetery, in Thatcher
- Willard City Cemetery
- Willard Pioneer Cemetery, in Willard
- Yost Cemetery, in Yost

== Cache County ==
- Avon Cemetery, in Avon
- Clarkston City Cemetery
- Cornish Cemetery, in Cornish
- Ephraims Grave, 19 km SW of Garden
- Hyde Park Cemetery, in Hyde Park
- Hyrum City Cemetery
- Lewiston City Cemetery
- Logan Cemetery, in Logan
- Mendon City Cemetery
- Millville City Cemetery
- Mount Sterling Cemetery, 4 km south of Wellsville
- Newton Cemetery, in Newton
- North Logan Memorial Park Cemetery, between North Logan and Hyde Park
- Paradise Cemetery, in Paradise
- Poulsen Family Cemetery, 3 km west of Peter (or Petersboro)
- Providence City Cemetery
- Richmond City Cemetery
- Smithfield City Cemetery
- Trenton Cemetery, in Trenton
- Wellsville Cemetery, in Wellsville

== Carbon County ==
- Carbonville Cemetery, in Helper
- Castle Gate Cemetery, in Castle Gate
- Central/Slovenian Cemetery, in Spring Glen
- Cliffview Cemetery, in Price
- East Carbon Cemetery, in East Carbon
- Gorley Cemetery, in Spring Glen
- Haycock Cemetery, in Spring Glen
- Hiawatha Cemetery, in Hiawatha
- Kiz Cemetery, in Sunnyside Junction
- Meade Cemetery, in Price
- Mountain View Cemetery, in Helper
- Price City Cemetery
- Scofield Cemetery, in Scofield
- Spring Glen Cemetery
- Sunnyside Power Plant Cemetery, in Sunnyside
- Valley View Cemetery, in East Carbon
- Wellington City Cemetery, in Wellington
- Whitmore Cemetery, in Price

== Daggett County ==
- Church Cemetery, in Dutch John
- Church Cemetery, in Manila

== Davis County ==
- Antelope Island Army Ranger and Air Force Memorial (not a cemetery)
- Bountiful Memorial Park, in Bountiful
- Centerville Memorial Park, in Centerville
- Clearfield City Cemetery
- Clinton City Cemetery
- Daniel Wood Cemetery, in Bountiful
- Farmington City Cemetery
- Frary Grave Site, on Antelope Island
- Kaysville City Cemetery
- Lakeview Memorial Park Cemetery, between Bountiful and Woods Cross
- Layton Hill Cemetery, between Clearfield and Layton
- Lindquist Memorial Park At Layton Cemetery, NE of Layton
- Sessions Settlement Pioneer Cemetery, in Woods Cross
- South Weber Cemetery, 3 km south of Washington Terrace
- Syracuse Cemetery, in Syracuse
- West Point Cemetery, in West Point

== Duchesne County ==
- Altamont-Mount Emmons Cemetery, 2 km west of Altamont and Mount Emmons
- Altonah Cemetery, in Altonah
- Bluebell Cemetery, in Bluebell
- Boneta-Mountain Home Cemetery, 9 km west of Altamont and Bluebell
- Bridgeland Cemetery, in Bridgeland, 14 km west of Myton
- Cedarview Cemetery
- Duchesne City Cemetery
- Fruitland Cemetery, in Fruitland
- Greenhalgh Cemetery, 4 km north of Neola
- Ioka Cemetery, 6 km north of Myton
- Monarch Cemetery, 2 km west of Neola
- Myton Cemetery, in Myton
- Neola Cemetery, in Neola
- Old Loka Cemetery, 9 km NW of Myton
- Roosevelt Memorial Park, in Roosevelt
- Strawberry Cemetery, 7 km west of Duchesne
- Tabiona-Redcliff Cemetery, 2 km north of Tabiona
- Talmage Cemetery, in Talmage
- Theodore Cemetery, in Duchesne
- Upalco Cemetery, in Upalco
- Utahn Cemetery, 10 km north of Duchesne

== Emery County ==
- Castle Dale City Cemetery
- Clawson Cemetery, in Clawson
- Cleveland Cemetery, in Cleveland
- Desert Lake Cemetery, 6 km east of Elmo
- Elmo Cemetery
- Emery Cemetery, in Emery
- Ferron City Cemetery
- Green River Pioneer Cemetery, in Green River
- Huntington City Cemetery
- Lawrence Cemetery, in Lawrence
- Molen Cemetery, in Molen
- Muddy Creek Cemetery, between Emery and Ferron
- Old Emery Cemetery, in Emery
- Orangeville Cemetery, in Orangeville
- Ridge Cemetery, 3 km east of Emery
- Tucker Family Cemetery, 3 km west of Cleveland
- Victor Cemetery, 3 km SW of Victor
- Wilsonville Cemetery, 7 km east of Castle Dale
- Woodside Cemetery, in Woodside

== Garfield County ==
- Antimony Cemetery, in Antimony
- Boulder Cemetery, in Boulder
- Bryce Canyon City Cemetery
- Cannonville Cemetery
- Escalante Cemetery
- Georgetown Cemetery
- Hatch City Cemetery, in Hatch
- Henrieville Cemetery
- Hillsdale Cemetery
- Loseeville Cemetery, 3 km east of Tropic
- Panguitch City Cemetery
- Spry Cemetery, 11 km north of Panguitch
- Tropic Cemetery
- Widtsoe Cemetery, in Widtsoe

== Grand County ==
- Andy Swenson Gravesite, 20 km east of Castle Valley and Spanish Valley
- Castle Valley Cemetery, 13 km east of Castle Valley and Spanish Valley
- Castleton Cemetery
- Elgin Cemetery
- Grand Valley Cemetery, 2 km south of Moab
- Red Cliffs Cemetery, 5 km NW of Castle Valley
- Sego Cemetery, in Sego
- Sunset Memorial Gardens Cemetery, 6 km NW of Spanish Valley
- Thompson Springs Cemetery

== Iron County ==
- Cedar City Cemetery
- Enoch Cemetery
- John McGarry Memorial Park Cemetery, 6 km west of Beryl Junction
- Kanarraville Cemetery
- Modena Cemetery
- Newcastle Cemetery
- Paragonah Cemetery
- Parowan City Cemetery
- State Line Cemetery
- Summit City Cemetery, in Summit

== Juab County ==
- Callao Cemetery, in Callao
- Diamond Cemetery, in Diamond
- Eureka Cemetery, in Mammoth Junction
- Fitch Cemetery, in Mammoth Junction
- Levan Cemetery, in Levan
- Mills Cemetery, in Mills
- Mona Cemetery, in Mona
- Nephi City Cemetery, in Nephi
- Pioneer Memorial Park, in Mona
- Rocky Ridge Cemetery, in Rocky Ridge
- Silver City Cemetery, in Silver City
- Swasey Family Cemetery, 2 km west of Mona
- Vine Bluff Cemetery, 2 km north of Nephi

== Kane County ==
- Adairville Cemetery, 23 km west of Big Water
- Alton Cemetery, in Alton
- Angels Rest at Best Friends, 11 km north of Kanab
- Elijah Averett Gravesite, 9 km south of Cannonville, Garfield County
- Glendale City Cemetery
- Harris Cemetery, in Glendale
- Johnson Cemetery, 14 km east of Kanab
- Kanab City Cemetery
- Kanab Pioneer Park Cemetery, in Kanab
- Mount Carmel Cemetery, in Mount Carmel
- Orderville Cemetery, in Orderville
- Pahreah Cemetery, in Pahreah
- Roundy-Johnson Cemetery, 4 km SE of Alton
- Roundy Cemetery, 3 km NE of Alton

== Millard County ==
- Anderson Family Cemetery, Meadow
- Burbank Cemetery, 14 km south of Garrison
- Delta City Cemetery
- Deseret City Cemetery
- Fillmore Cemetery
- Hinckley City Cemetery
- Hockman Cemetery, in Kanosh
- Holden Cemetery
- Kanosh Cemetery
- Kanosh Indian Village, 4 km NE of Kanosh
- Leamington Cemetery
- Lynndyl Cemetery
- McCornick Cemetery
- Meadow Cemetery
- Oak City Cemetery
- Oasis Cemetery
- Scipio Cemetery
- Scipio Pioneer Cemetery, in Scipio
- Sutherland Cemetery
- Talbot Family Cemetery, 3 km east of Leamington

== Morgan County ==
- Croydon Cemetery
- Milton Cemetery, 4 km west of Morgan
- Mountain Green Cemetery
- North Morgan Cemetery, 2 km north of Morgan
- Peterson Cemetery
- Porterville Cemetery
- Richville Cemetery, 4 km south of Morgan
- South Morgan Cemetery, in Morgan

== Piute County ==
- Circleville Cemetery
- Dennis Cemetery, 4 km south of Marysvale
- Harris Cemetery, 2 km north of Junction
- Howes Cemetery, 5 km ESE of Alunite
- Junction Cemetery
- Junction Hill Cemetery, in Junction
- Junction Lower Cemetery, in Junction
- Kingston Cemetery
- Mountain View Cemetery, in Marysvale
- Murrays Cemetery, 2 km north of Marysvale
- Terrace Hill Cemetery, in Junction
- Thompsonville Cemetery, 4 km SSSE of Marysvale

== Rich County ==
- Eastman Family Cemetery, 4 km west of Woodruff
- Garden City Cemetery
- Laketown Cemetery
- Meadowville Cemetery
- Randolph City Cemetery
- Round Valley Cemetery, 6 km SW of Laketown
- Woodruff Cemetery

== Salt Lake County ==
- Alta City Cemetery
- Bingham City Cemetery
- Bluffdale City Cemetery
- B'Nai Israel Cemetery, on the south side of Salt Lake City Cemetery, at 4th Avenue/Center Street
- Brigham Young Family Memorial Cemetery, on 1st Avenue east of State Street in Salt Lake City
- Chandler Cemetery, 3 km WSW of Copperton
- Crescent Cemetery, in Sandy
- Draper City Cemetery
- Elysian Burial Gardens, in Sugar House, Salt Lake City
- Fort Douglas Cemetery, in Fort Douglas
- Granite City Cemetery
- Herriman Cemetery
- Holladay Memorial Park Cemetery, in Holladay
- Kimball-Whitney Cemetery, in northern Salt Lake City, NW of North Temple/State Streets
- Lake Hills Memorial Estates, 3 km west of Sandy
- Larkin Sunset Gardens Draper, 2 km SSE of Sandy
- Larkin Sunset Lawn Cemetery, in Sugar House, 6 km ESE of Salt Lake City
- Midvale City Cemetery
- Montefiore Cemetery, on the south side of Salt Lake City Cemetery, at 4th Avenue/Cypress Street
- Mormon Pioneer Memorial Monument (not a cemetery)
- Mount Calvary Catholic Cemetery, at the SE corner of Salt Lake City Cemetery, at 4th Avenue/T Street
- Mount Olivet Cemetery, in SE Salt Lake City, at 1300 East/500 South Streets. Set up by Act of Congress
- Mountain View Memorial Estates, in Cottonwood Heights
- Murray Cemetery
- Pleasant Green Cemetery, Magna, Utah. Established 1883
- Redwood Memorial Cemetery, in southern Taylorsville
- Riverton City Cemetery
- Salt Lake City Cemetery, Salt Lake City. Established 1848/49.
- Salt Lake Memorial Mausoleum (AKA City View Mausoleum), in the Avenues of NE Salt Lake City, north of 11th Avenue
- Sandy City Cemetery
- Shaarey Tzedek Cemetery, in the Avenues of NE Salt Lake City
- South Jordan Cemetery
- Taylorsville Memorial Park Cemetery
- Union Fort Pioneer Cemetery, 3 km WSW of Cottonwood Heights
- Utah Veterans Cemetery and Memorial Park, 5.5 km south of Bluffdale
- Valley View Memorial Park, in West Valley City
- Wasatch Lawn Memorial Park, 8 km SSE of Salt Lake City, in Sugar House
- Wasatch Lawn Memorial Park South, 3 km WSW of Riverton
- West Jordan City Cemetery
- Wights Fort Cemetery, 4 km SW of West Jordan

== San Juan ==
- Aneth Area Cemetery, 3 km NW of Aneth
- Blanding City Cemetery
- Bluff Cemetery
- Cedar Point Cemetery, 29 km SE of Monticello
- Hole 'n the Rock Cemetery, 10 km NNW of La Sal Junction
- La Sal Cemetery, in La Sal
- Monticello City Cemetery
- Mountain View Cemetery, 22 km ESE of Monticello
- Saint Christopher's Cemetery, 3 km east of Bluff
- Urado Cemetery, 19 km SW of Dove Creek, Colorado
- Valley View Cemetery, 18 km WNW of Dove Creek, Colorado
- Verdure Cemetery, 10 km south of Monticello

== Sanpete County ==
- Axtell Cemetery
- Centerfield Cemetery
- Chester Cemetery
- Dover Cemetery
- Ephraim Park Cemetery, in Ephraim
- Ephraim Pioneer Cemetery, 3 km north of Ephraim
- Fairview Lower Cemetery, 2 km NW of Fairview
- Fairview Upper Cemetery, 2 km NW of Fairview
- Fayette Cemetery,
- Fountain Green Cemetery
- Freedom Cemetery
- Gunnison Cemetery
- Manti Cemetery
- Mayfield Cemetery
- Moroni City Cemetery
- Mount Pleasant City Cemetery
- Park Cemetery, in Ephraim
- Spencer Cemetery, in Indianola
- Spring City Cemetery, 2 km west of Spring City
- Spring City Pioneer Cemetery, in Spring City
- Sterling Cemetery
- Wales Cemetery
- Yorgason Family Cemetery, in Fountain Green

== Sevier County ==
- Annabella
- Aurora Cemetery
- Burrville Cemetery
- Central Valley Cemetery, 2 km north of Nibley
- East Side Cemetery, in Salina
- Elsinore Cemetery
- Glenwood Cemetery, 2 km north of Glenwood
- Glenwood Pioneer Cemetery, in Glenwood
- Joseph Cemetery
- Koosharem Cemetery
- Monroe City Cemetery
- Pioneer Cemetery, 2 km NE of Salina
- Redmond Cemetery
- Richfield City Cemetery
- Salina City Cemetery
- Sevier Cemetery
- Sigurd Cemetery
- Venice Cemetery
- Vermillion Cemetery

== Summit County ==
- Coalville Cemetery
- Cooper-Hughes-Vickory Cemetery, 9 km WNW of Oakley
- Emory Cemetery, in Emory, 14 km NE from Echo
- Glenwood Cemetery, Park City
- Henefer Cemetery
- Hoytsville Cemetery
- Kamas Bible Church Cemetery, in Kamas
- Kamas Cemetery, in Francis
- Lower Francis Cemetery, 2 km ESE of Francis
- Marion Cemetery
- North Bench/Oakley Cemetery, in Oakley
- Park City Cemetery, 2 km NNW of Park City
- Peoa Cemetery
- Rockport Cemetery
- Seymour/Davis Cemetery, 5.5 km NW of Peoa
- Snyderville Pioneer, in Snyderville
- Stevens Cemetery, in Oakley
- Upper Francis Cemetery, 2 km ESE of Francis
- Upton Cemetery, 15 km ENE of Coalville
- Wanship Cemetery
- Woodland Cemetery

== Tooele County ==
- Chief Green Jacket Grave, 10 km SSE of Vernon
- Clover Cemetery, 2 km WSW of Clover
- Erda Pioneer Cemetery, in Erda
- Grantsville City Cemetery
- Ibapah Cemetery, Ibapah
- Iosepa Settlement Cemetery, in Iosepa, 31 km NW of Rush Valley
- Johnson Cemetery, 9 km SW of Ophir
- Lake Point Cemetery
- Mercur Cemetery
- Ophir Old/New Cemeteries, 3 km WSW of Ophir
- Saint John Cemetery Saint John
- Stansbury Park Cemetery, Stansbury Park - owned by Stansbury Park Service Agency, located north of Benson Grist Mill.
- Stockton Cemetery
- Tooele Cemetery, Tooele - owned by Tooele City, located in SE Tooele.
- Vernon City Cemetery
- Wendover Cemetery, Wendover

== Uintah County ==
- Avalon Cemetery, 16 km E of Randlett
- Deadmans Grave, 18 km SSE of Jensen
- Dragon Cemetery, in Dragon
- Dry Fork Cemetery, 16 km NW of Vernal
- Fairview Cemetery, 5.5 km W of Vernal
- Fort Duchesne Cemetery, 6 km NNE of Ft. Duchesne
- Gusher Cemetery, 2 km NE of Ft. Duchesne
- Harms Cemetery, 2 km east of Whiterocks
- Hayden Cemetery, 6 km ESE of Neola
- Jensen Cemetery
- Lapoint Cemetery
- Leota Cemetery, in Leota, 12 km NNE of Ouray
- Maeser Fairview, in Maeser
- Randlett Cemetery
- Reeds Cemetery, 6.6 km NNW of Whiterocks
- Rock Point Cemetery, 2 km NNE of Maeser
- Tridell Cemetery
- Uintah and Ouray Indian Cemetery, 2 km NW of Fort Duchesne
- Vernal Memorial Park
- White Rocks Cemetery

== Utah County ==
- East Lawn Memorial Hills, Provo, Utah – Privately owned cemetery by the Grow Family in the hills of Utah County overlooking Utah Valley.
- Provo City Cemetery, Provo, Utah – This cemetery is publicly owned and operated by Provo City.
- Orem City Cemetery, Orem, Utah
- Springville Evergreen Cemetery, Springville, Utah
- Historic Springville Cemetery, Springville, Utah
- Spanish Fork City Cemetery, Spanish Fork, Utah
- Lehi City Cemetery, Lehi, Utah
- Lindon City Cemetery, Lehi, Utah
- Temple Hill Cemetery, Provo, Utah (Defunct)
- Fort Utah Cemetery, Provo, Utah (Defunct)
- Grandview Hill Cemetery, Provo, Utah (Defunct)
- Christmas Tree Cemetery, Provo, Utah (Defunct)
- Alpine City Cemetery, Alpine, Utah
- American Fork City Cemetery, American Fork, Utah
- Benjamin Cemetery
- Cedar Fort
- Colton Cemetery
- Eagle Mountain City Cemetery, Eagle Mountain, Utah
- Elk Ridge City Cemetery, Elk Ridge, Utah
- Fairfield City Cemetery
- Forest City Graveyard
- Genola City Cemetery
- Goshen City Cemetery
- Highland City Cemetery
- Mapleton City Cemetery
- Mill Fork
- Payson City Cemetery
- Pleasant Grove City Cemetery
- Salem City Cemetery
- Santaquin City Cemetery
- Soldier Summit Cemetery
- Spring Lake
- Spring Lake Cemetery
- Tucker Cemetery

== Wasatch County ==
- Center Creek Cemetery, in Center Creek, 5.5 km SE of Heber
- Charleston Cemetery, in Charleston
- Heber City Cemetery
- Midway City Cemetery
- Mound City Cemetery, in Mound City, 2 km NW of Midway
- Soldier Summit Cemetery
- Wallsburg Cemetery, in Wallsburg
- William Walter Wilson Burial Site, 2 km WNW of Interlaken

== Washington County ==
- Central Cemetery, in Central, Utah, 11 km WNW of Pine Valley
- Duncan's Retreat, 5.5 km ESE of Virgin
- Enterprise City Cemetery
- Grafton Cemetery, in Grafton, 4 km west of Rockville
- Gunlock Cemetery, in Gunlock
- Hamblin Cemetery, 11 km ESE of Enterprise
- Harrisburg Cemetery, in Harrisburg, Utah, 4.3 km SW of Leeds
- Hebron Cemetery, in Hebron, 9.7 km WNW of Enterprise
- Hilltop Cemetery, in Springdale
- Holt Cemetery, 7.6 km east of Enterprise
- Hurricane City Cemetery
- Ivins City Cemetery
- La Verkin City Cemetery
- Leeds Cemetery
- Mountain Meadows Massacre Memorial, 6.6 km NNW of Central
- New Harmony Cemetery
- Old Alexander Cemetery, in Washington UT
- Pine Valley Cemetery
- Pinto Cemetery
- Pintura Cemetery, in Pintura
- Rockville Cemetery
- Saint George City Cemetery
- Santa Clara Cemetery
- Shivwits Paiute Indian Cemetery, in Shivwits
- Shunesburg Cemetery, in Shunesburg, 4 km SSE of Springdale
- Silver Reef Catholic Cemetery, in Leeds
- Silver Reef Protestant Cemetery, in Leeds, 0.3 km east of SR Catholic Cemetery
- Springdale City Cemeter
- Tonaquint Cemetery, 3 km SSW of Saint George
- Toquerville Cemetery
- Veyo Cemetery, in Veyo, 9.3 km SW of Central
- Virgin Cemetery
- Washington City Cemetery
- Winsor Memorial Cemetery, in Enterprise

== Wayne County ==
- Aldrich Cemetery, 24 km east of Torrey
- Bicknell Cemetery
- Caineville Cemetery, in Caineville
- Crowther Gravesite, 9 km SW of Caineville
- Esther Fenn Gravesite, in Notom, 13 km ESE of Fruita
- Fremont Cemetery, in Fremont
- Giles Cemetery, 11 km WSW of Hanksville
- Grover Cemetery, in Grover, 9.7 km SE of Torrey
- Hanksville Cemetery, 3 km NE of Hanksville
- Loa Cemetery, in Loa
- Lyman Cemetery, 2 km WSW of Lyman
- Notom Cemetery, 2 km north of Notom, 26 km east of Torrey
- Teasdale Cemetery, in Teasdale, 5 km WSW of Torrey
- Torrey Cemetery, in Torrey
- Torrey Cemetery, 2 km east of Torrey
- Town Point Cemetery, 15 km west of Hanksville

== Weber County ==
- Abbey of the Holy Trinity Cemetery, 5.5 km ESE of Huntsville
- Aultorest Memorial Park, in Ogden
- Ben Lomond Cemetery, in North Ogden
- Evergreen Memorial Park, 5 km NNE of Ogden
- Hooper Cemetery
- Huntsville Cemetery, 3 km west of Huntsville
- Liberty Cemetery, in Liberty
- Meadow View Cemetery, in Eden
- Memorial Gardens of the Wasatch, 2 km NNW of Uintah
- Mountain View Cemetery, in Eden
- Ogden City Cemetery
- Plain City Cemetery
- Roy City (Stoker) Cemetery
- Uintah Town Cemetery, 2 km west of Uintah
- Warren Cemetery, 5.5 km WSW of Plain City
- Washington Heights Memorial Cemetery, in South Ogden
- West Warren Cemetery, 7.6 km SW of Plain City
- West Weber-Taylor Cemetery, 2 km south of Plain City
