= Utah State Route 83 =

State highway in Utah, United States

State Route 83
- SR 83 highlighted in red

Route information
- Maintained by UDOT
- Length: 30.726 mi (49.449 km)
- Existed: 1975–present
- History: 1962: Rerouted north to Howell

Major junctions
- South end: SR-13 in Corinne
- SR-102 south of Penrose
- North end: I-84 in Howell

Location
- Country: United States
- State: Utah
- Counties: Box Elder

Highway system
- Utah State Highway System; Interstate; US; State; Minor; Scenic
← SR-82	→ I-84

State Route 83 (SR-83) is a 30.726-mile (49.449 km) state highway in eastern Box Elder County, Utah, United States, that connects the towns of Corinne and Howell and provides access to Golden Spike National Historic Site from the east, as well as Thiokol's facility.

== Route description ==
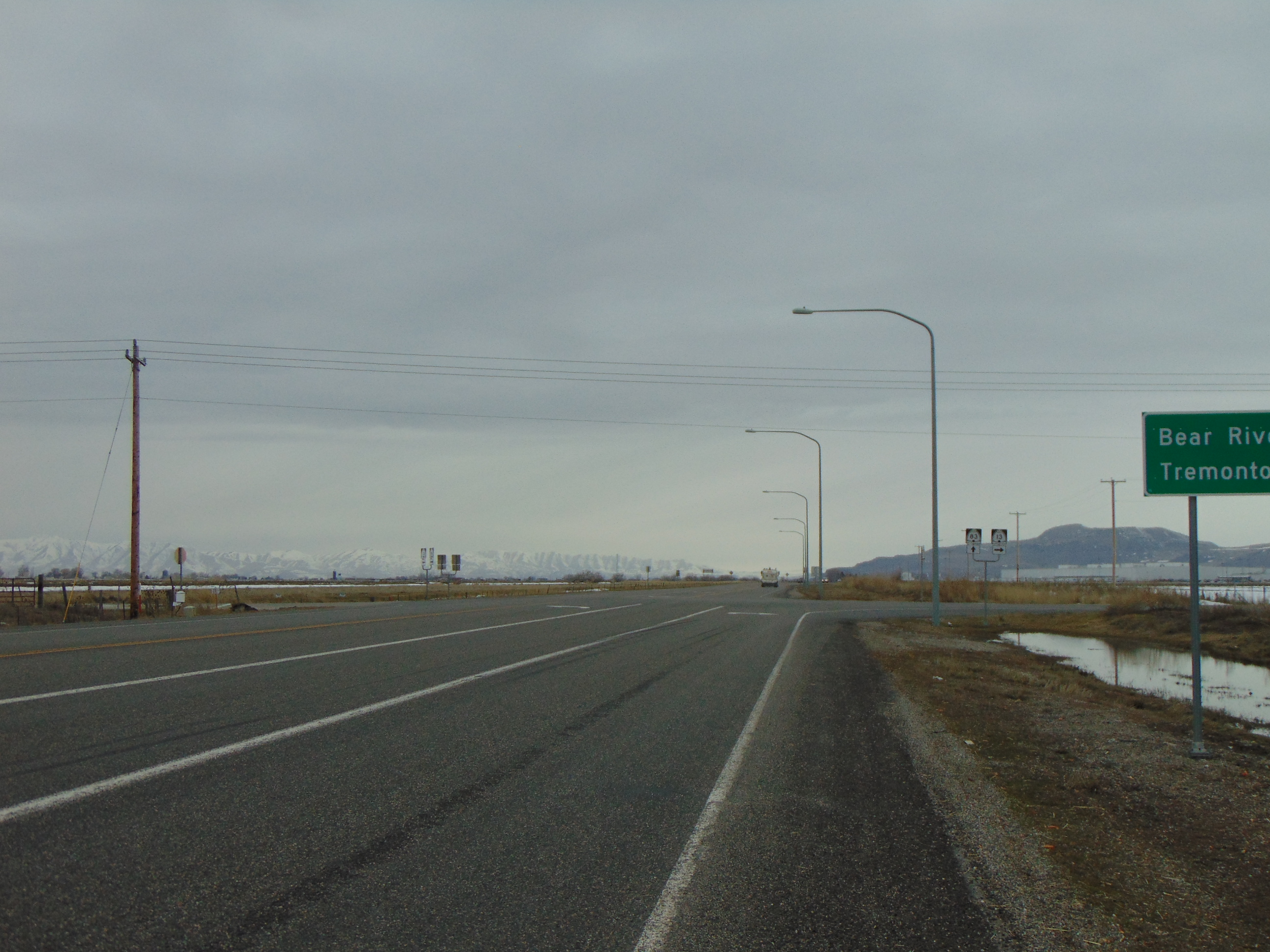
West at the southern terminus of SR-83 at its junction with Utah State Route 13 in eastern Corinne, Utah, February 2017

The route starts in the western part of Corinne at SR-13, at the intersection of 4800 West and Promontory Road. SR-83 proceeds to the northwest along Promontory Road, leaving Corinne and continuing in this direction past largely open land for about 14 miles (23 km). The route passes Utah State Route 102, which provides access to Tremonton via Penrose, Thatcher, and Bothwell. After this junction, the route starts to turn northward, passing Lampo Junction, a local access road to Golden Spike National Historical Park), and the Thiokol rocket plant and test range. From this point, the route continues north, save for a 1-mile (1.6 km) jog to the east, passing through Howell and terminating at the Howell interchange of Interstate 84.

== History ==
The road from Corinne to Park Valley Junction was commissioned as SR-83 in 1935. In 1955, the portion west of Promontory Junction was decommissioned, and was replaced by the road from Promontory Junction to the Golden Spike National Historic Park.

In 1962, the portion west of Lampo Junctionwas transferred back to local jurisdiction, and the route was extended north from Lampo Junction to the Howell interchange of the former Utah State Route 5 (modern day Interstate 84).

In 2008, SR-83 underwent a minor change when SR-13 underwent a realignment, moving the intersection of the two routes north-northwest by nearly 1 mile (1.6 km). The portion of SR-83 between the old and new intersections was transferred to SR-13, putting the western terminus of SR-83 at the new intersection.

== Major intersections ==
The entire route is in Box Elder County.

Location	mi	km	Destinations	Notes
Corinne	0.000	0.000	SR-13 north (North 4800 West) – Bear River City, Tremonton SR-13 east – Brigham City	Southern terminus; Prior to 2008, SR-83 continued east to North 4100 West (SR-13)
	13.057	21.013	SR-102 – Tremonton, I-84, I-15	Southern terminus of SR-102
Lampo Junction	16.527	26.598	Golden Spike Road (West 7200 North)	Access road west to Golden Spike National Historical Park} (former routing of SR-83)
Howell	23.687	38.121	Faust Valley Road east – Bothwell	SR-83 turns north onto North 17200 West
Howell	30.623– 30.726	49.283– 49.449	I-84 west – Snowville, Burley (Idaho), Boise (Idaho) I-84 east – Tremonton, Ogden, Salt Lake City	Northern terminus I-84 Exit 26
1.000 mi = 1.609 km; 1.000 km = 0.621 mi

== See also ==
- List of state highways in Utah
- List of named highway junctions in Utah
