= Curlew Valley =

Valley in Utah and Idaho, United States

- Location within Utah
- Length: 23 mi (37 km)
- Width: 10 mi (16 km)

Geography
- Location: Utah & Idaho
- Population centers: Snowville (Utah); Stone (Idaho); Holbrook (Idaho)
- Borders on: Great Salt Lake-S (Hogup Mountains-SSW); Raft River Mountains-W; Curlew National Grassland-NNE; Hansel Mountains-E & SE; Locomotive Springs Wildlife; Management Area-SSW
- Coordinates: 41.900476°N 112.999432°W
- Rivers: Deep Creek, Great Salt Lake
- Interactive map of Curlew Valley

The Curlew Valley is a 23-mile (37 km) long valley located on the northern edge of the Great Salt Lake in Box Elder County in northern Utah and extending north into Oneida County in southern Idaho.

Within northeast Box Elder County, the southwest of the valley abuts the Locomotive Springs Wildlife Management Area and an extensive salt flat on the edge of the Great Salt Lake.

== Description ==
The Curlew Valley trends southwest to northeast with Deep Creek towards the valley's west. At the valley's northeast, Deep Creek turns east, then almost due north into Idaho, meeting the unincorporated community of Stone and the south border of the Curlew National Grassland. Adjacent to Stone, upstream and south is the townsite of Snowville, Utah on Interstate 84, which traverses the valley diagonally from the northwest (Idaho) by southeast. The route goes through the divide between the Hansel Mountains (south) and the North Hansel Mountains and continues southeast through the Blue Creek Valley, the south West Hills and continues on to Brigham City.

The Curlew Valley center is slightly east-southeast of Coyote Springs, on Deep Creek. A mountain peak, Cedar Hill lies adjacent eastwards, 5,181 feet (1,579 m). Directly west and south of Coyote Springs lies another peak, Wildcat Hills, 5,077 feet (1,547 m).

=== Rose Ranch Reservoir ===
At the northeast of the valley, the Stone Hills force Deep Creek to transect east; here, about 3–5 miles (4.8–8.0 km) west and southwest of Snowville is the Rose Ranch Reservoir, formed on Deep Creek.

== History ==
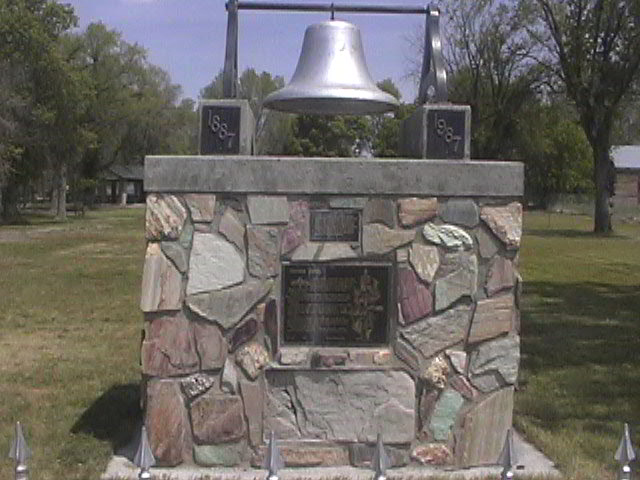
Curlew Valley Settler's Bell at the Snowville City Park.

Curlew Valley, named after the curlew snipe that nests there. The first recorded white men were Peter Skene Ogden's large party of trappers that camped on Deep Creek on December 27, 1828.

Some of the discharged members of the Mormon Battalion, on their way home from California to Salt Lake City on September 18, 1848, camped on Deep Creek and also in a cave 1 mile (1.6 km) east called Hollow Rock.

The beginning of Deep Creek is a large spring at Holbrook, which runs through the center of the valley and has never varied even in dry years. About 1 mile (1.6 km) southwest is Rocky Ford, where the pioneers were able to pass on solid rock.

In 1869 William Robbins, Thomas Showell and William M. Harris settled at the Curlew Sinks, ten miles (16 km) west of here, where Deep Creek sinks into the ground. The old pioneer trail and the stage line went through their ranch.

The first townsite in the Curlew Valley was Snowville. Settled at the direction of Brigham Young and named in honor of Lorenzo Snow: an apostle at the time, but later to become the 5th President of the Church of Jesus Christ of Latter-day Saints 1898–1901. Snowville was laid out on August 14, 1878.

== See also ==
- List of valleys of Utah
