= Hansel Mountains =

Mountain range in Utah, United States

- Location within Utah

Highest point
- Peak: Unnamed peak on SE ridge
- Elevation: 6,243 ft (1,903 m)
- Coordinates: 41°50′54″N 112°40′22″W

Dimensions
- Length: 35 mi (56 km) SW x NE
- Width: 11 mi (18 km)

Geography
- Country: United States
- State: Utah
- Region: Great Basin Desert
- County: Box Elder
- Communities: Snowville, Utah and Stone, Idaho
- Borders on: Great Salt Lake, Locomotive Springs Wildlife Management Area, Sage Valley, Curlew Valley, North Hansel Mountains, Hansel Valley, North Promontory Mountains and Salt Wells Flat
- Topo map(s): USGS Tremonton, Utah-Idaho, 30x60 minute Quad, USGS, 1989

The Hansel Mountains are a 35 miles (56 km) long mountain range located in north Utah on the northern border of the Great Salt Lake.

Located in northeast Box Elder County, the southwest of the range abuts the Locomotive Springs State Wildlife Management Area; the northeast end of the range ends at a lower elevation divide between the North Hansel Mountains that lie on the Utah-Idaho border. Snowville lies on Deep Creek in the Sage Valley to the northwest. Interstate 84 travels northwest-southeast through the mountain divide. The mountain range continues southwest and south and ends at Monument Point overlooking the Great Salt Lake to the south, and the wildlife management area to the west.

== Peaks ==
The highest elevation in the mountains is an unnamed peak 6,243 feet (1,903 m) on the southeast ridge of the range. Monument Peak, 5,997 feet (1,828 m), is located at the southwest end of the range.

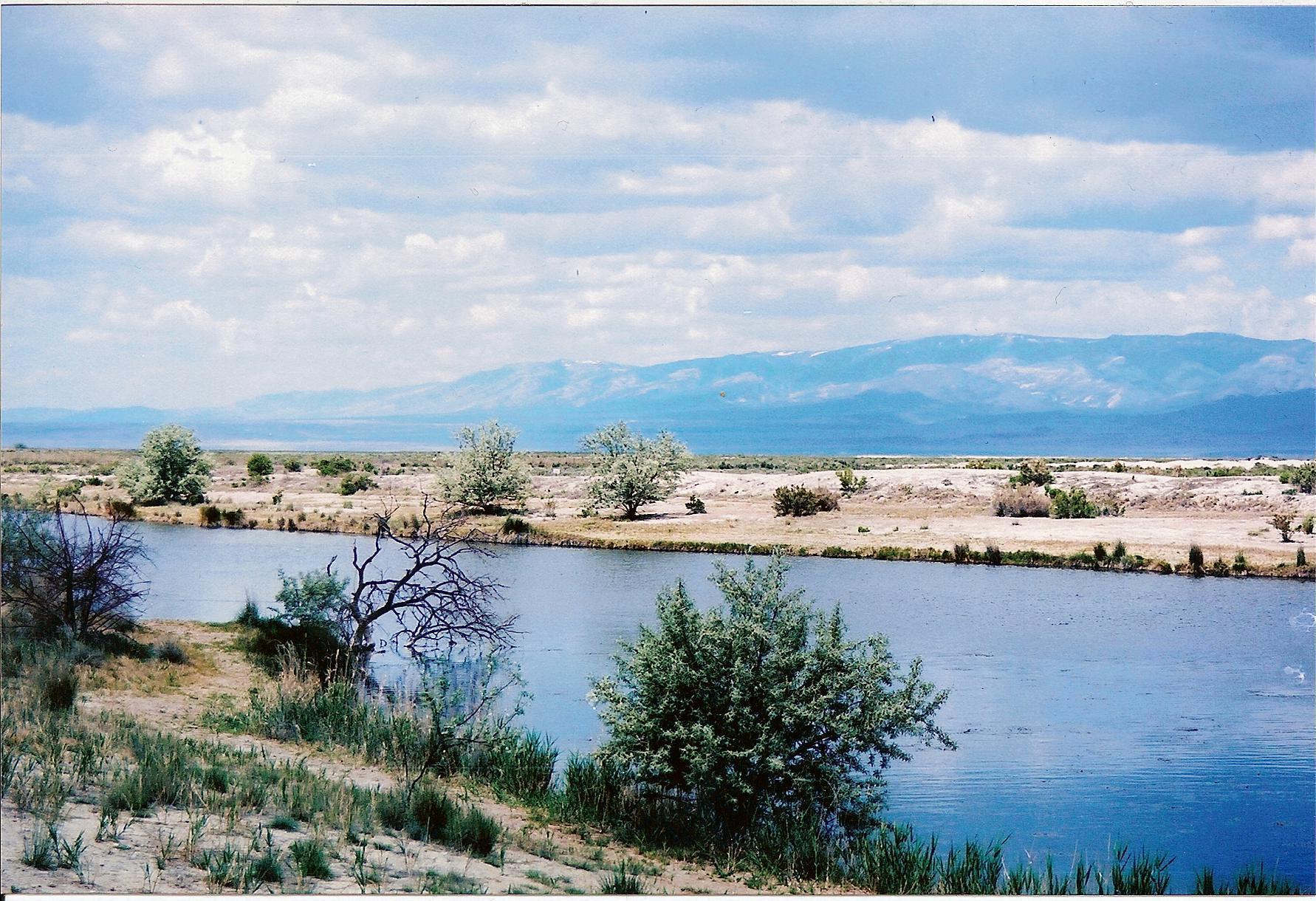
View northwest to the Raft River Mountains from Locomotive Springs Wildlife Management Area
