= Utah State Route 38 =

State highway in Utah, United States

State Route 38

Route information
- Maintained by UDOT
- Length: 18.952 mi (30.500 km)
- Existed: 1931 as SR-69; renumbered 1993–present

Major junctions
- South end: SR-13 in Brigham City
- SR-240 in Honeyville; SR-102 in Deweyville
- North end: SR-30 at Collinston

Location
- Country: United States
- State: Utah

Highway system
- Utah State Highway System; Interstate; US; State; Minor; Scenic
| ← SR-37 | → SR-39 |

State Route 38 is a state highway in Box Elder County in the U.S. state of Utah. It runs north from Brigham City to Collinston (northeast of Tremonton). The highway was originally State Route 69, but was renumbered in 1993 due to sign theft caused by the sexual connotation of the number.

== Route description ==
Starting in the north end of Brigham City at the east edge of the Bear River Valley, the route travels north through Harper Ward for approximately one mile until it reaches the west edge of the Wellsville Mountains. The route then continues through Harper Ward, turning north-northwest to follow along the edge of the mountain range. Upon reaching the city of Honeyville, it resumes a more northerly direction through Crystal Springs, Madsen, and Deweyville, before ending in Collinston.

== History ==
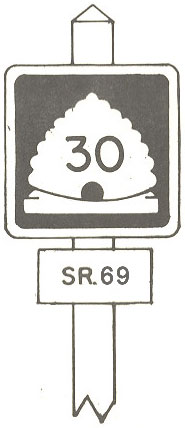
Signage used from 1966 to 1977 between Deweyville and Logan

The Utah State Road Commission took over maintenance of State Route 69 from Brigham City via Collinston to Logan on May 12, 1931. The route began at the present SR-13 - then US-30S - in Brigham City, and ran north on the east side of the valley to Collinston. There it turned east over Beaver Dam Summit to the north of the Wellsville Mountains, and crossed the Cache Valley to US-91 in Logan. This remained the route of SR-69 until the 1977 renumbering, though in 1966 SR-30 became the "state signed guide number" northeast of the junction with SR-102 in Deweyville, in order to provide a continuous signed route across the northern counties of Utah.

On May 20, 1977, the portion that had been signed as SR-30 since 1966 was officially renumbered as part of SR-30, truncating SR-69 to a Brigham City (SR-13) to Deweyville (SR-30) highway. The Department of Transportation passed a resolution on March 24, 1989, recommending that the State Legislature modify SR-30 to run west from Collinston to the under-construction I-15, partially restoring the portion of SR-69 that had been eliminated in 1977. The Legislature approved the change in 1991, after this part of I-15 - the last Interstate section in Utah - opened on November 20, 1990.

The popular SR-69 sign

In 1993, the director of UDOT's District One, which included SR-69, requested a renumbering, due to problems with sign theft:

"The SR-69 route signs have become a collectors' item for a large number of individuals, resulting in a large expense for us in replacing the signs. We suspect it is college students that are taking most of the signs, as there is a very significant loss in SR-69 sign panels during the college school year. We lose approximately 35 sign panels each year from this route. Often, the post is also damaged - requiring replacement. We do not experience losses anywhere close to this magnitude on any other route."

The Utah Transportation Commission approved the request, changing the number from 69 to 38 (which had been unused since 1975) on October 15, 1993; signs were replaced in April 1994. No changes of any significance have been made since then.

== Major intersections ==
The entire route is in Box Elder County.

| Location | mi | km | Destinations | Notes |
|---|---|---|---|---|
| Brigham City | 0.000 | 0.000 | SR-13 (900 North) | Southern terminus |
| Honeyville | 8.290 | 13.341 | SR-240 (6900 North) | |
| Deweyville | 14.011 | 22.549 | SR-102 | |
| Collinston | 18.952 | 30.500 | SR-30 (15200 North) | Northern terminus |
1.000 mi = 1.609 km; 1.000 km = 0.621 mi
