= Utah State Route 240 =

Highway in Utah

State Route 240

Route information
- Maintained by UDOT
- Length: 1.217 mi (1.959 km)
- Existed: 1982–present

Major junctions
- West end: I-15 / I-84 in Honeyville
- East end: SR-38 in Honeyville

Location
- Country: United States
- State: Utah

Highway system
- Utah State Highway System; Interstate; US; State; Minor; Scenic
← SR-235	→ SR-241

State Route 240 (SR-240) is a short state highway in the U.S. state of Utah. It serves as a connector route between Interstate 15/Interstate 84 (I-15/I-84) and SR-38 in Honeyville.

== Route description ==
The route begins at exit 372 on I-15/I-84 and proceeds east on 6900 North. It proceeds east for about one mile before crossing Salt Creek and the Union Pacific Railroad tracks. Shortly thereafter, it enters the central area of Honeyville and comes to its eastern terminus at 2600 West (SR-38).

== History ==
Upon the recommendation of Honeyville officials, the route was added to the state highway system in 1982.

== Major intersections ==
The entire route is in Honeyville, Box Elder County.

mi	km	Destinations	Notes
0.000– 0.246	0.000– 0.396	I-15 / I-84 – Brigham City, Tremonton	Western terminus
1.217	1.959	SR-38 (2600 West)	Eastern terminus
1.000 mi = 1.609 km; 1.000 km = 0.621 mi
