= Howell, Utah =

Town in the state of Utah, United States

Howell
- Town
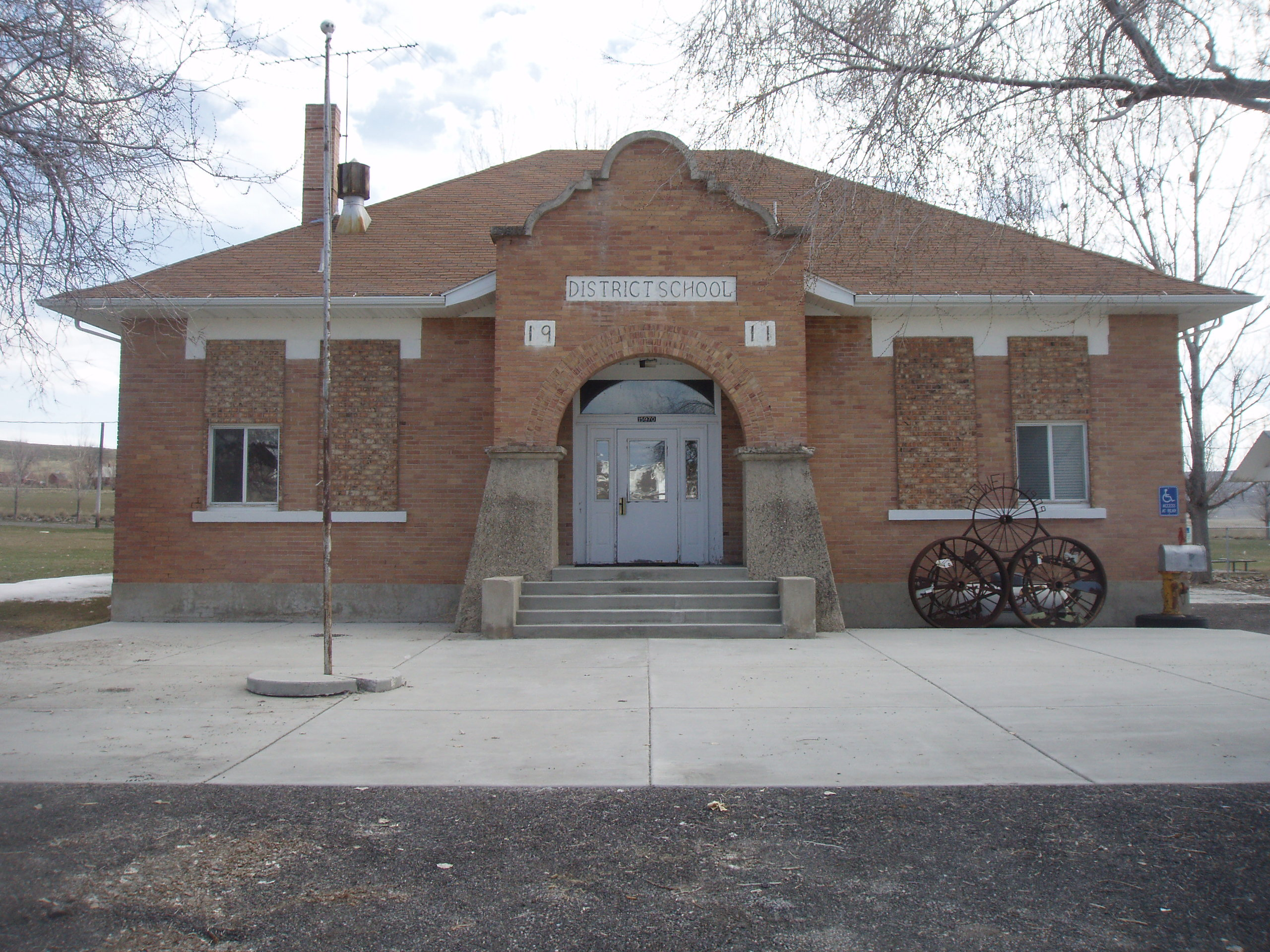
- The old schoolhouse in Howell, March 2009

- Location of Howell within Box Elder County and the State of Utah.

- Location of Utah in the United States
- Coordinates: 41°46′23″N 112°27′35″W
- Country: United States
- State: Utah
- County: Box Elder
- Settled: 1910
- Incorporated: 1941
- Named for: Joseph Howell

Area
  - Total: 35.47 sq mi (91.87 km^{2})
  - Land: 35.27 sq mi (91.36 km^{2})
  - Water: 0.20 sq mi (0.51 km^{2})
- Elevation: 4,561 ft (1,390 m)

Population (2020)
  - Total: 240
  - Density: 7.2/sq mi (2.78/km^{2})
- Time zone: UTC-7 (Mountain (MST))
  - Summer (DST): UTC-6 (MDT)
- ZIP code: 84316
- Area code: 435
- FIPS code: 49-36620
- GNIS feature ID: 2412774
- Website: howelltown.utah.gov

Howell is a town located in the Blue Creek Valley in northeast Box Elder County, Utah, United States. The population was 240 at the 2020 census.

== Geography ==
According to the United States Census Bureau, the town has a total area of 35.6 square miles (92 km^{2}), of which 35.4 square miles (92 km^{2}) is land and 0.2 square miles (0.52 km^{2}) (0.56%) is water.

=== Climate ===
There is a weather station nearby at Thiokol Airport. Thiokol Airport/Howell's climate borders between being semi-arid and humid continental climate (Köppen BSk/Dfb), characterized by cold winters, warm-to-hot summers, and high diurnal temperature variation throughout the year.

Climate data for Thiokol Propulsion F S, Utah, 1991–2020 normals, 1962-2020 extremes: 4600ft (1402m)
Month	Jan	Feb	Mar	Apr	May	Jun	Jul	Aug	Sep	Oct	Nov	Dec	Year
Record high °F (°C)	56 (13)	65 (18)	74 (23)	85 (29)	96 (36)	103 (39)	108 (42)	107 (42)	98 (37)	88 (31)	78 (26)	60 (16)	108 (42)
Mean maximum °F (°C)	44.6 (7.0)	53.5 (11.9)	67.0 (19.4)	77.5 (25.3)	85.5 (29.7)	95.4 (35.2)	100.9 (38.3)	99.6 (37.6)	93.4 (34.1)	81.1 (27.3)	61.5 (16.4)	48.2 (9.0)	101.9 (38.8)
Mean daily maximum °F (°C)	29.8 (−1.2)	36.7 (2.6)	48.4 (9.1)	56.0 (13.3)	66.8 (19.3)	81.1 (27.3)	89.6 (32.0)	89.1 (31.7)	77.0 (25.0)	60.4 (15.8)	44.4 (6.9)	34.3 (1.3)	59.5 (15.3)
Daily mean °F (°C)	21.2 (−6.0)	24.9 (−3.9)	36.1 (2.3)	43.1 (6.2)	53.1 (11.7)	64.1 (17.8)	71.9 (22.2)	70.8 (21.6)	59.5 (15.3)	44.7 (7.1)	32.8 (0.4)	23.1 (−4.9)	45.4 (7.5)
Mean daily minimum °F (°C)	12.5 (−10.8)	13.2 (−10.4)	23.7 (−4.6)	30.1 (−1.1)	39.3 (4.1)	47.0 (8.3)	54.2 (12.3)	52.4 (11.3)	42.0 (5.6)	28.9 (−1.7)	21.2 (−6.0)	12.0 (−11.1)	31.4 (−0.3)
Mean minimum °F (°C)	−1.7 (−18.7)	−0.5 (−18.1)	11.0 (−11.7)	20.3 (−6.5)	26.9 (−2.8)	35.3 (1.8)	45.2 (7.3)	42.6 (5.9)	30.1 (−1.1)	18.0 (−7.8)	6.3 (−14.3)	−2.8 (−19.3)	−8.1 (−22.3)
Record low °F (°C)	−28 (−33)	−29 (−34)	−5 (−21)	10 (−12)	15 (−9)	29 (−2)	35 (2)	30 (−1)	20 (−7)	10 (−12)	−17 (−27)	−27 (−33)	−29 (−34)
Average precipitation inches (mm)	1.42 (36)	0.98 (25)	1.24 (31)	1.12 (28)	1.84 (47)	1.09 (28)	0.60 (15)	0.82 (21)	0.98 (25)	1.13 (29)	0.72 (18)	1.47 (37)	13.41 (340)
Average snowfall inches (cm)	5.2 (13)	4.5 (11)	0.7 (1.8)	0.2 (0.51)	0.0 (0.0)	0.0 (0.0)	0.0 (0.0)	0.0 (0.0)	0.0 (0.0)	0.1 (0.25)	2.6 (6.6)	7.0 (18)	20.3 (51.16)
Source 1: NOAA
Source 2: XMACIS2 (1982-2010 snowfall, records & monthly max/mins)

== Demographics ==
Historical population
Census	Pop.	Note	%±
1920	302		—
1930	246		−18.5%
1940	281		14.2%
1950	176		−37.4%
1960	188		6.8%
1970	146		−22.3%
1980	176		20.5%
1990	237		34.7%
2000	221		−6.8%
2010	245		10.9%
2020	240		−2.0%
U.S. Decennial Census

As of the census of 2000, there were 221 people, 68 households, and 55 families residing in the town. The population density was 6.2 people per square mile (2.4/km^{2}). There were 75 housing units at an average density of 2.1 per square mile (0.8/km^{2}). The racial makeup of the town was 99.10% White, 0.45% African American and 0.45% Native American.

There were 68 households, out of which 41.2% had children under the age of 18 living with them, 75.0% were married couples living together, 4.4% had a female householder with no husband present, and 19.1% were non-families. 19.1% of all households were made up of individuals, and 4.4% had someone living alone who was 65 years of age or older. The average household size was 3.25 and the average family size was 3.76.

In the town, the population was spread out, with 36.2% under the age of 18, 12.2% from 18 to 24, 20.8% from 25 to 44, 22.6% from 45 to 64, and 8.1% who were 65 years of age or older. The median age was 26 years. For every 100 females, there were 130.2 males. For every 100 females age 18 and over, there were 101.4 males.

The median income for a household in the town was $40,750, and the median income for a family was $42,250. Males had a median income of $39,861 versus $12,292 for females. The per capita income for the town was $16,510. About 7.3% of families and 7.6% of the population were below the poverty line, including 12.6% of those under the age of eighteen and 17.6% of those 65 or over.

== History ==
Howell lies in the Blue Creek Valley that stretches north-south between four mountain ranges, Promontory Mountains, south, North Promontory Mountains, west, West Hills, northeast, and Blue Spring Hills, southeast. The northeast Great Salt Lake lies to the south of Howell, and north of Howell finds Interstate 84, roughly the area known to locals as Blue Creek. Nomadic Shoshone Indians used the area to travel between the Great Salt Lake and areas to the north.

Charles Crocker, a California developer and business man oversaw development of the First transcontinental railroad, which passed through Promontory, about 10 miles (16 km) south of Howell. The Golden Spike was driven near Promontory (at Lampo) in 1869. Crocker formed the Promontory Land and Livestock Company in this time period, which had land holdings that stretched from the Great Salt Lake north to Idaho, and west to Nevada. The area was used for cattle ranching, with headquarters in Promontory, Howell, and the Dilly Ranch. The company disbanded in 1909.

In 1909 the newly created Promontory-Curlew Land Company purchased the Promontory Land and Livestock Company's Utah and Idaho land holdings. Howell is named after Utah Congressman Joseph Howell who was involved with the Promontory-Curlew Land Company.

In 1910 Nephi Nessen purchased 1,000 acres (4.0 km^{2}) from the Promontory-Curlew Land Company, and established the first private and permanent residence in Howell. Nessen was born in Logan, Utah in 1867, the son of Danish immigrants and converts to the Church of Jesus Christ of Latter-day Saints who crossed the plains from the east as part of a Handcart company. Other settler families included Andersen, Baxter, Cravens, Gunnell, Bailey, Carlsen, Douglas, Fonnesbeck, Rock, Wood, Allen, Barber, and Maughn.

The Bar M Ranch was headquartered near what is now the town center. A school was opened in 1910 in a Bar M Ranch building. In 1911, a new school was opened (pictured above), which has now been converted into a community center. In 1980, a modern school was built for kindergarten through third grades, but closed in 2008.

In 1904, the Blue Creek Reservoir was built on Blue Creek, 1 mile (1.6 km) northwest of Howell. However, the reservoir is now located almost entirely within the town limits

== Transportation ==
While I-84 only passes through the northeastern corner of the town, SR-83 heads south from the interstate to pass through the town (and continues on to Corinne).

== See also ==
- List of cities and towns in Utah
