= Sunset Lawn =

Sunset Lawn may refer to:

- Larkin Sunset Lawn Cemetery, a cemetery in Salt Lake County, Utah
- Sunset Lawn Cemetery (Harrisburg, Illinois), Harrisburg, Illinois
