= Deep Creek (Great Salt Lake) =

Stream in Oneida County, Idaho and Box Elder County, Utah in the United States

- Location of the mouth of Deep Creek in Utah Deep Creek (Great Salt Lake) (the United States)

Location
- Country: United States
- State: Utah, Idaho
- Counties: Box Elder County, Utah, Oneida County, Idaho

Physical characteristics
- Source
  - location: north of Holbrook, Oneida County, Idaho
  - coordinates: 42°21′40″N 112°35′41″W
  - elevation: 5,339 ft (1,627 m)
- Mouth: Great Salt Lake
  - location: southeast of Kelton, Box Elder County, Utah
  - coordinates: 41°41′42″N 113°00′26″W
  - elevation: 4,206 ft (1,282 m)
- Length: 73 mi (117 km)

Deep Creek is a 73-mile (120 km) long in Oneida County, Idaho and Box Elder County, Utah in the United States, that is a tributary of the Great Salt Lake.

== Description ==
Beginning at an elevation of 5,339 feet (1,627 m) north of Holbrook in northern Oneida County, it flows south into Box Elder County, passing through Curlew Valley and the uninicorporated communities of Holbrook and Stone in Idaho and the town of Snowville in Utah. It then flows to its mouth on the northern edge of the Great Salt Lake, southeast of Kelton, at an elevation of 4,206 feet (1,282 m).

== See also ==
- List of rivers of Utah
- List of rivers of Idaho
- List of longest streams of Idaho
