= Harper Ward, Utah =

Unincorporated community on Box Elder County, Utah, United States

Harper Ward
- Unincorporated community
- Location within the state of Utah Location within the United States
- Coordinates: 41°36′40″N 112°03′29″W
- Country: United States
- State: Utah
- County: Box Elder
- Settled: 1852
- Elevation: 4,324 ft (1,318 m)
- Time zone: UTC-7 (Mountain (MST))
  - Summer (DST): UTC-6 (MDT)
- ZIP codes: 84302
- Area code: 435
- GNIS feature ID: 1441508

Harper Ward is an unincorporated community in Box Elder County, Utah, United States. It is located along Utah State Route 38 for 8 miles (13 km) between Brigham City and Honeyville. Previously known as Call's Fort (1855–1906), it was renamed Harper Ward in 1906 in honor of Thomas Harper, who served as LDS branch president (1866–1877) and later as the first LDS bishop (1877–1899) in the area.

== History ==
Historical population
Census	Pop.	Note	%±
1880	350		—
1890	377		7.7%
1900	488		29.4%
1910	603		23.6%
1920	743		23.2%
1930	238		−68.0%
1940	237		−0.4%
1950	284		19.8%
Source: U.S. Census Bureau

In 1852, John Gibbs and George Foster moved from Brigham City and began to homestead the land, creating the first permanent settlements in the area. They were joined by a few other families in 1853. In 1855, following a visit from President Brigham Young, Anson Call constructed a fort in the area, which would give the community its name for the next fifty years. Thomas Harper was hired to manage Call's farm in the spring of 1856. John Gibbs became the first branch leader (1853–1856, 1858–1860), and was succeeded by Joseph Tomlinson (1856–1858), Chester Loveland (1860–1865), James May (1865–1866), and Thomas Harper (1866–1877). Harper continued to preside over the area as bishop in 1877 when the Box Elder Stake was formed and the area was organized as the North Ward. Following Bishop Harper's death in 1899, the name of the ward was changed to Harper Ward in his honor on June 6, 1906. Harper Ward has also become the name of the associated geographical region, although its boundaries have not always been coterminous with those of the ecclesiastical unit.
