= Blue Creek Valley =

Valley in Utah, United States

- Location within Utah
- Length: 18 mi (29 km) N-S
- Width: 8 mi (13 km)

Geography
- Country: United States
- State: Utah
- Region: Great Basin Desert
- County: Box Elder
- Communities: Blue Creek; Howell
- Borders on: List: Pocatello Valley; West Hills; Blue Spring Hills; Promontory Mountains; Hansel Mountains
- Coordinates: 41°51′44″N 112°27′25″W
- River: Blue Creek Spring
- Lake: Blue Creek Reservoir
- Interactive map of Blue Creek Valley

Blue Creek Valley is an 18-mile (29 km) long valley located in northeast Box Elder County, Utah. It is endorheic with the Blue Creek Reservoir its low point located south in the valley's center. The valley is nestled between three mountainous regions. The West Hills and Blue Spring Hills border it to the east and southeast, respectively. The south abuts the north of the Promontory Mountains, and the west is formed by a small north–south range, the North Promontory Mountains. The north of the valley borders the south of Idaho's Pocatello Valley.

== Valley description ==
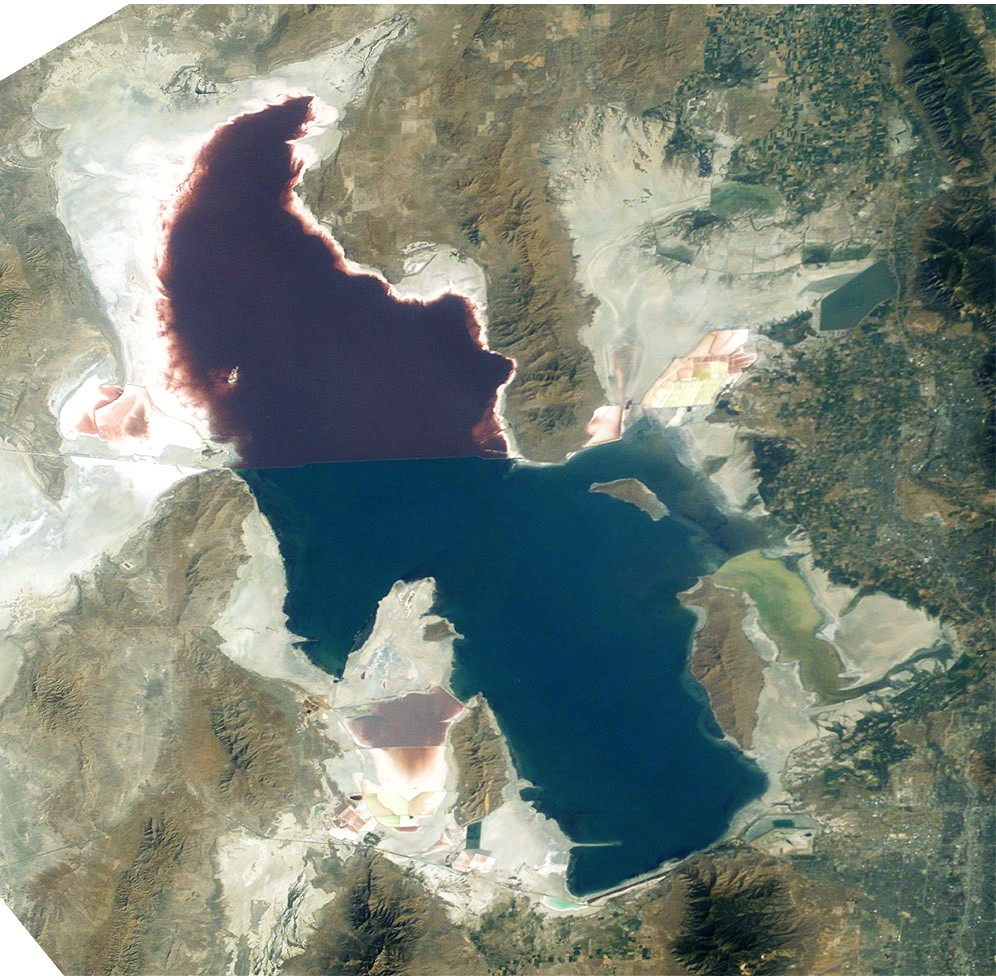
Blue Creek Valley, north-northeast of the peninsular-Promontory Mountains, only extreme south visible against the hills/mountains (the ridgeline terminus of the North Promontory Mountains to west, the circular mountain between the two, is Cedar Ridge) (the brownish hills SE-(at Penrose, Utah), are the Blue Spring Hills)

Because Blue Creek Valley is narrow, only 5-8 mi wide, small feeder creeks feed the region from the four cardinal directions. Blue Creek Reservoir is located in the center-south of the valley, with Blue Creek Spring located 2 mi northeast, the main feed to the reservoir.

The outlet of Blue Creek Reservoir trends south past Howell, Utah, into agricultural land. A peak associated with the north of the Promontory Mountains ends the valley's south, at the mountain range foothills. The mountain, Engineer Mountain, 5,400 feet (1,646 m), and parts of the north Promontory Mountains drain north into the south border of Blue Creek Valley; southwest drainage from the mountain region drains southwest into the Bear River Bay section of the northeast Great Salt Lake.

== Valley low point ==
The lowest elevation in the valley is south of Blue Creek Reservoir, its outlet, and to the farmland around Howell, Utah. Blue Creek Reservoir is at 4,593 feet (1,400 m).
