= Holbrook, Idaho =

Unincorporated community in Oneida County, Idaho, United States

- Unincorporated community
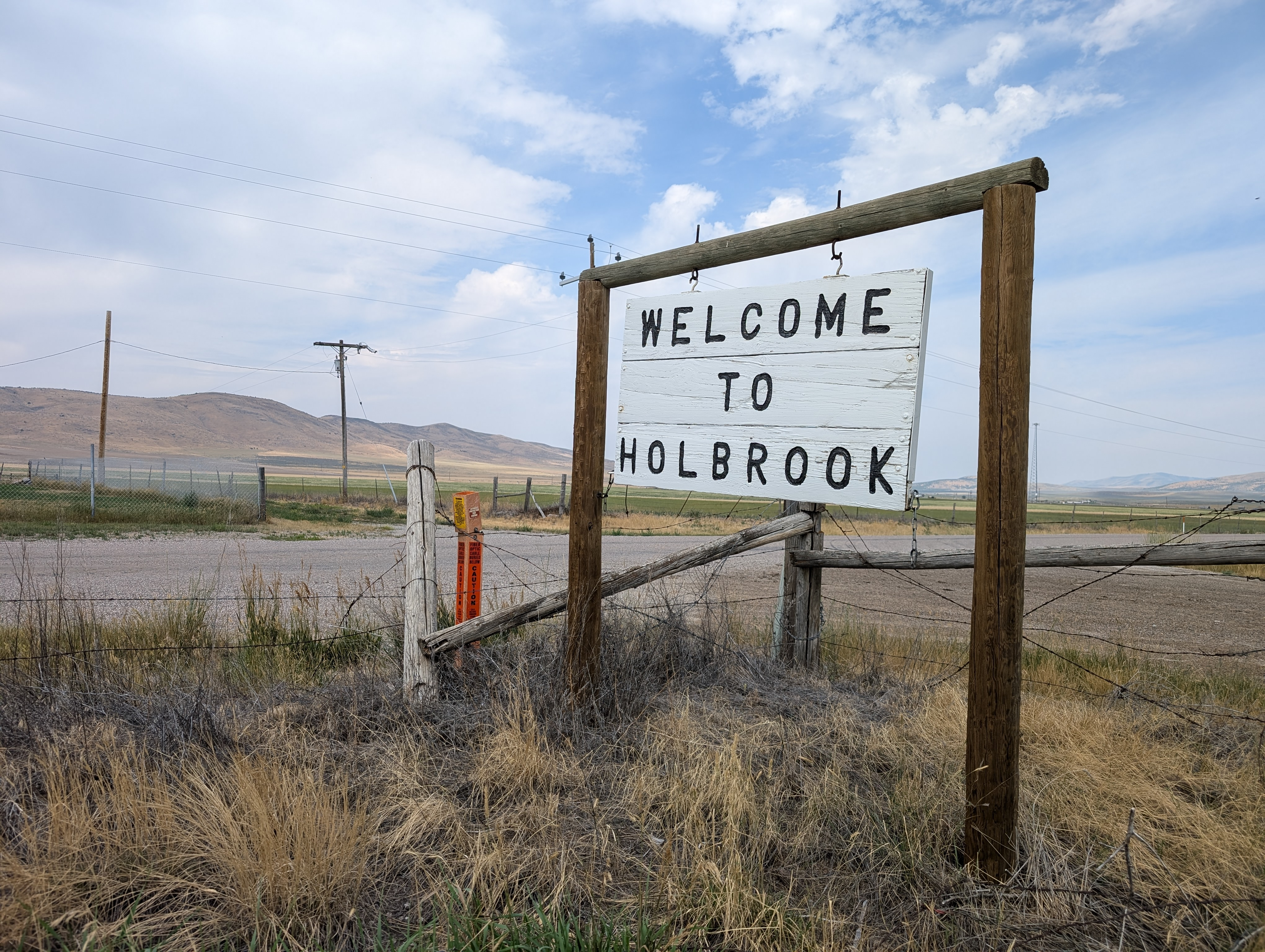
- Welcome to Holbrook sign, August 2023

- Location within Idaho Location within the United States
- Coordinates: 42°09′43″N 112°39′14″W
- Country: United States
- State: Idaho
- County: Oneida
- Elevation: 4,780 ft (1,460 m)
- Time zone: UTC-7 (Mountain (MST))
  - Summer (DST): UTC-6 (MDT)
- ZIP code: 83243
- Area codes: 208, 986
- GNIS feature ID: 383244

Holbrook is an unincorporated community along the Rock and Deep creeks in west central Oneida County, Idaho, United States.

== Description ==
Holbrook lies in the Curlew Valley at the west end of Idaho State Highway 38 (at a junction with the former southern end of Idaho State Highway 37, approximately 25 miles (40 km) west of Malad City (the county seat of Oneida County).

== History ==
Holbrook was settled in the late 1890s by residents of Mendon, Utah and surrounding areas who were drawn to the area due to the availability of land to homestead. The town is named after Heber Angell Holbrook, an early Mormon Bishop in the town.

Holbrook's population was estimated at 100 in 1909, and was just 10 in 1960.
