= Kimball-Whitney Cemetery =

Cemetery in Salt Lake City, Utah

Coordinates: 40°46′22″N 111°53′21″W

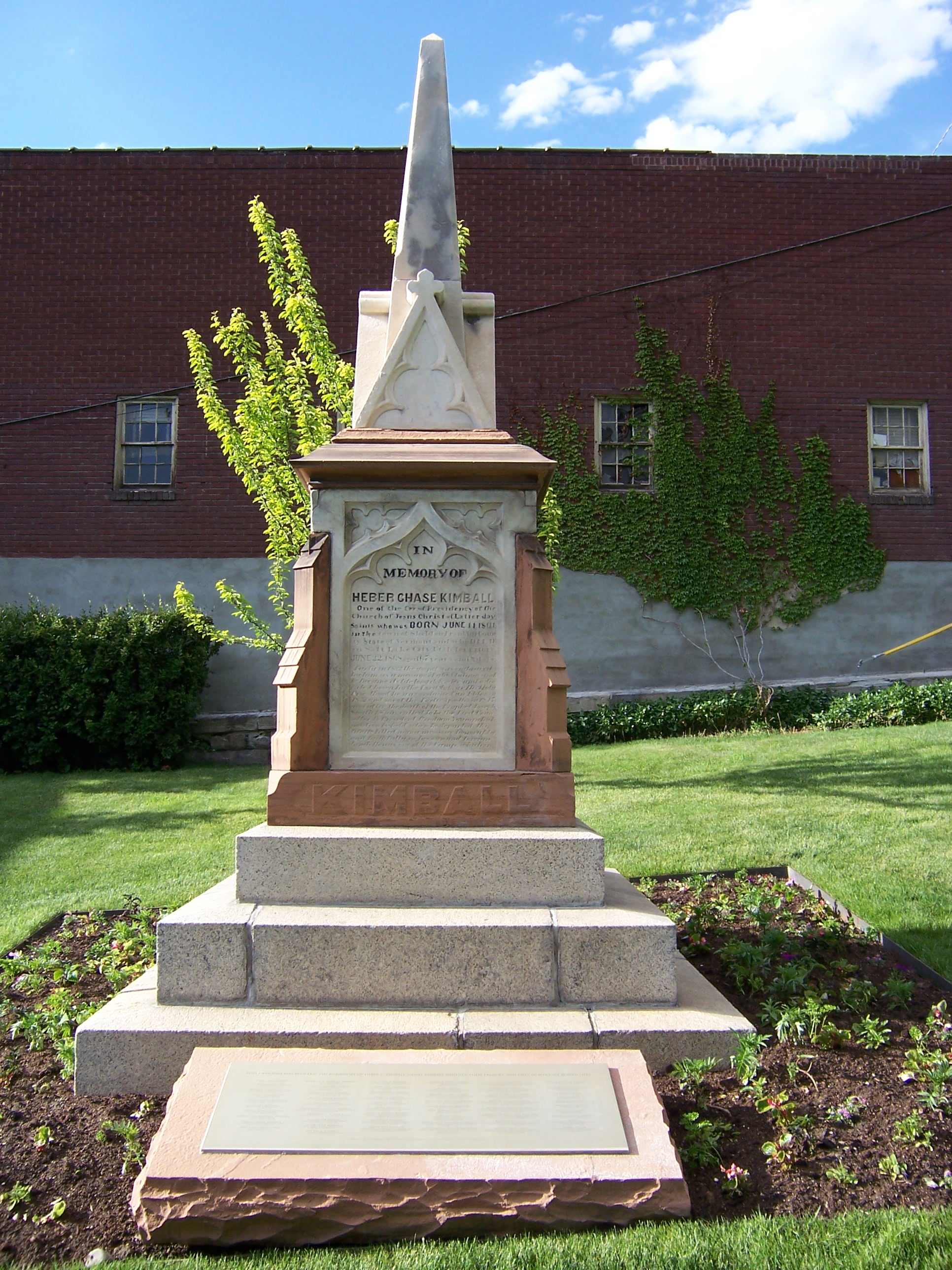
- A monument inside the cemetery listing all fifty-six names, May 2006
- Interactive map of Kimball-Whitney Cemetery

Details
- Established: 1848
- Location: Salt Lake City, Utah
- Size: 1.2 acres (0.49 ha)
- No. of graves: 56
- Find a Grave: Kimball-Whitney Cemetery

The Kimball-Whitney Cemetery is a cemetery in Salt Lake City, Utah. United States. It is where the remains of fifty-six persons related to Heber C. Kimball and Newel K. Whitney are interred. Set aside in 1848, it is one of the first formally dedicated burial grounds within the Salt Lake Valley.

== Location ==
It is located on the south slope of what's now known as Capitol Hill neighborhood, an area once called "Heber's Bench", directly north of the North Office Building at 180 North Main Street; at the center of the block between N State Street, North Temple, and 200 North. It encompasses approximately 1.2 acres (4,900 m^{2}).

== History ==
In 1848, property owned by Heber C. Kimball and Newel K. Whitney was set aside as a cemetery. Whitney was buried there after his death on 23 September 1850. Eighteen years later, Kimball and his wife Vilate were as well. In total, fifty-six family members and friends were buried there, the majority in unmarked graves.

In the 1890s, the Kimball and Whitney families placed a marker on the monument inside the cemetery containing all fifty-six names.

In 1976, the Daughters of Utah Pioneers placed a bronze marker at the Main Street entrance of the cemetery, which reads: "Heber C. Kimball, pioneer of 1847 and First Counselor to Brigham Young, was allotted the land adjacent to this monument upon which to build homes for his family, the majority of whom arrived in 1848. He and Newel K. Whitney dedicated a plot of ground one-half block east as a private cemetery for both families. Buried therein are 33 Kimballs, 13 Whitneys, and 10 others. Both Heber C. Kimball and Newell K. Whitney are interred in this sacred spot."

On 20 June 1998, Elder Bruce D. Porter of the Seventy rededicated the monument.

== See also ==
- List of cemeteries in Utah
