= West Hills (Box Elder County, Utah) =

Mountain range in Boc Elder County, Utah and Oneida County, Idaho in the United States

- Location within Utah

Highest point
- Peak: Limekiln Knoll
- Elevation: 6,660 ft (2,030 m)

Dimensions
- Length: 20 mi (32 km) NNW x SSE
- Width: 13 mi (21 km) (variable)

Geography
- Country: United States
- State(s): Utah and Idaho
- Region: Great Basin Desert
- County: Box Elder and Oneida County
- Cities: Blue Creek and Portage
- Range coordinates: 41°57′55″N 112°21′14″W
- Borders on: Samaria Mountains, Malad River, I-15, Malad Range, Salt Creek Wildlife Management Area, Blue Spring Hills and Blue Creek Valley

The West Hills are a 20-mile-long (32 km) mountain range located in northeast Box Elder County, Utah, United States, that extends slightly north into Oneida County, Idaho. The range is connected to the Samaria Mountains, a small range on the north in southern Idaho. The West Hills are also connected to another section on the southwest, the Blue Spring Hills. West of the Blue Spring and West Hills is a long north–south valley, the Blue Creek Valley.

The West and Blue Spring Hills also lie west of the south flowing Bear River which feeds into Bear River Bay of the Great Salt Lake's northeast.

== Description ==
The West Hills are slightly northwest trending. The peak elevations are around 5,000 to 6,000 feet (1,500 to 1,800 m), with the highpoint of the range in the extreme northwest, Limekiln Knoll, 6,660 feet (2,030 m), near the Idaho border and the Samaria Mountains.

=== Routes ===
Interstate 15 parallels the mountain range on its east and southeast, following the south-flowing Malad River, a west tributary to the south-flowing Bear River.

Interstate 84 traverses the section between the Blue Spring Hills on the southwest, a route from Idaho (northwest), southeast to Tremonton and then Brigham City.

== See also ==
- List of mountain ranges in Idaho
- List of mountain ranges of Utah
