= Blue Creek, Utah =

- Ghost town
- Location within Utah Location within the United States
- Coordinates: 41°51′44″N 112°27′25″W
- Country: United States
- State: Utah
- County: Box Elder
- Founded: 1869
- Abandoned: 1900s
- Elevation: 4,701 ft (1,433 m)
- GNIS feature ID: 1437505

Blue Creek is a ghost town in the Blue Creek Valley in northeastern Box Elder County, Utah, United States.

== Description ==
The community was a railroad settlement that started as a Union Pacific camp during the final stages of construction of the First transcontinental railroad.

Located on the eastern slope of the North Promontory Mountains and Blue Creek Valley, 15 miles (24 km) southeast of Snowville and 20 miles (32 km) west of Tremonton on what is now I-84, Blue Creek existed from the late 1860s until it was abandoned in the 1900s.

The settlement was named for the Blue Creek Spring, 2.5 miles (4.0 km) to the south. Initially a railroad camp, Blue Creek later became a farming community with a few scattered homes and a post office.

In his autobiography, 19th century pioneer Alexander Toponce wrote, "In April and May of 1869, Corinne and Blue Creek were pretty lively places. At the latter place was a big construction camp generally known as Dead Fall and spoken of by some as Hell’s Half Acre."

== See also ==
- List of ghost towns in Utah
