= Penrose, Utah =

Unincorporated community in the state of Utah, United States

- Unincorporated community
- Location within the state of Utah
- Coordinates: 41°39′03″N 112°18′06″W
- Country: United States
- State: Utah
- County: Box Elder
- Settled: 1890
- Founder: C. S. Rowher
- Named for: Charles W. Penrose
- Elevation: 4,268 ft (1,301 m)
- Time zone: UTC-7 (Mountain (MST))
  - Summer (DST): UTC-6 (MDT)
- ZIP code: 84337
- Area code: 435
- GNIS feature ID: 1437656

Penrose is an unincorporated farming community in eastern Box Elder County, Utah, United States.

== Description ==
Historical population
Census	Pop.	Note	%±
1920	220		—
1930	155		−29.5%
1940	159		2.6%
1950	169		6.3%
Source: U.S. Census Bureau

Penrose is located along the last 7 miles (11 km) of Utah State Route 102, approximately 3 miles (4.8 km) south of Thatcher.

The community was named for Charles W. Penrose, an apostle for the Church of Jesus Christ of Latter-day Saints.

The first permanent settler to the Penrose area was C.S. Rowher, in 1890. He, along with others, farmed beets, wheat, corn and hay.
