= Stone, Idaho =

Unincorporated community in the state of Idaho, United States

- Unincorporated community
- Location within Idaho Location within the United States
- Coordinates: 42°00′59″N 112°41′43″W
- Country: United States
- State: Idaho
- County: Oneida
- Elevation: 4,567 ft (1,392 m)
- Time zone: UTC-7 (Mountain (MST))
  - Summer (DST): UTC-6 (MDT)
- Area codes: 208, 986
- GNIS feature ID: 398190

Stone is an unincorporated community in Oneida County, Idaho, United States. Stone is located near the Utah border, 3.5 miles (5.6 km) north of Snowville, Utah.
