= Deweyville, Utah =

Town in the state of Utah, United States

- Town
- Location in Box Elder County and the state of Utah.

- Location of Utah in the United States
- Coordinates: 41°41′35″N 112°05′18″W
- Country: United States
- State: Utah
- County: Box Elder
- Founded: 1864
- Incorporated: March 7, 1939
- Named for: John C. Dewey

Area
  - Total: 6.38 sq mi (16.52 km^{2})
  - Land: 6.38 sq mi (16.52 km^{2})
  - Water: 0 sq mi (0.00 km^{2})
- Elevation: 4,328 ft (1,319 m)

Population (2020)
  - Total: 417
  - Density: 65.4/sq mi (25.2/km^{2})
- Time zone: UTC-7 (Mountain (MST))
  - Summer (DST): UTC-6 (MDT)
- ZIP code: 84309
- Area code: 435
- FIPS code: 49-19680
- GNIS feature ID: 2412425
- Website: www.deweyvilleut.gov

Deweyville is a town in Box Elder County, Utah, United States. The population was 417 at the 2020 census, up from the 2010 figure of 332.

== Geography ==
According to the United States Census Bureau, the town has a total area of 6.4 square miles (17 square kilometres), all land. Much of what the local population refers to as Deweyville is actually land outside the town boundaries, located in unincorporated Box Elder County. This includes the Cedar Ridge Subdivision, a 26-house development located 1.6 miles north of incorporated Deweyville.

The town is also known for its unique location adjacent to the Wasatch Range - the steepest mountain range in the country based on the height-to-base ratio. The Deweyville portion of the western slopes of the Wasatch is home to several notable geologic and natural destinations, including Gribble Arch, Lizzy's Landing, The Easter Caves, and The Cedar Trees. Chocolate Peak in northern Deweyville was the location of numerous winter Hillclimb attempts in the late 20th and early 21st centuries.

== History ==
On March 14, 1864, the John C. Dewey family, Mormon pioneer immigrants from England, left Calls Fort, Utah, and settled at Empey Springs, an area originally settled by William Empey. Empey Springs became known as Dewey Springs. Other settlers soon moved to the area.

John C. Dewey directed many community activities, including the construction of a school house in 1869 and a Sunday school in 1872. The schoolhouse served as a community center where dances were commonly held. A post office was established in 1873, with John C. Dewey as the Postmaster. In 1877, a LDS Church Ward was organized, with John C. Dewey as Bishop.

Deweyville was a stop on the Utah Northern Railroad. The Oregon Short Line Railroad took over the Utah Northern Line in 1874 and converted the tracks to standard gauge. The town served as the main shipping point for the Bear River Valley until 1901. This, along with the construction of the Bothwell and Hammond Canals, contributed to significant business development. Saloons, a brewery, two boarding houses, a barber shop, and lumber, hardware, and merchandise businesses were opened.

On March 7, 1939, Deweyville was granted a municipal charter by Box Elder County.

In 1941, a water system was installed. This was one of the last Public Works Administration projects completed in Utah.

== Demographics ==
Historical population
Census	Pop.	Note	%±
1880	339		—
1890	183		−46.0%
1900	204		11.5%
1910	292		43.1%
1920	363		24.3%
1930	334		−8.0%
1940	256		−23.4%
1950	233		−9.0%
1960	265		13.7%
1970	248		−6.4%
1980	311		25.4%
1990	318		2.3%
2000	278		−12.6%
2010	332		19.4%
2020	417		25.6%
U.S. Decennial Census

As of the census of 2000, there were 278 people, 98 households, and 68 families in the town. The population density was 43.1 people per square mile (16.6/km^{2}). There were 106 housing units at an average density of 16.4 per square mile (6.3/km^{2}). The racial makeup of the town was 95.68% White, 0.72% Asian, 2.16% from other races, and 1.44% from two or more races. Hispanic or Latino of any race were 2.16% of the population.

There were 98 households, out of which 31.6% had children under the age of 18 living with them, 58.2% were married couples living together, 6.1% had a female householder with no husband present, and 30.6% were non-families. 29.6% of all households were made up of individuals, and 13.3% had someone living alone who was 65 years of age or older. The average household size was 2.84, and the average family size was 3.57.

In the town, the age distribution of the population shows 30.2% under 18, 12.9% from 18 to 24, 20.9% from 25 to 44, 23.7% from 45 to 64, and 12.2% who were 65 years of age or older. The median age was 33 years. For every 100 females, there were 97.2 males. For every 100 females aged 18 and over, there were 98.0 males.

The median income for a household in the town was $43,750, and the median income for a family was $58,750. Males had a median income of $42,500 versus $26,250 for females. The per capita income was $20,260. About 5.0% of families and 5.6% of the population were below the poverty line, including 2.2% of those under eighteen and 6.7% of those 65 or over.
