= Locomotive Springs Wildlife Management Area =

Protected area in Utah, United States

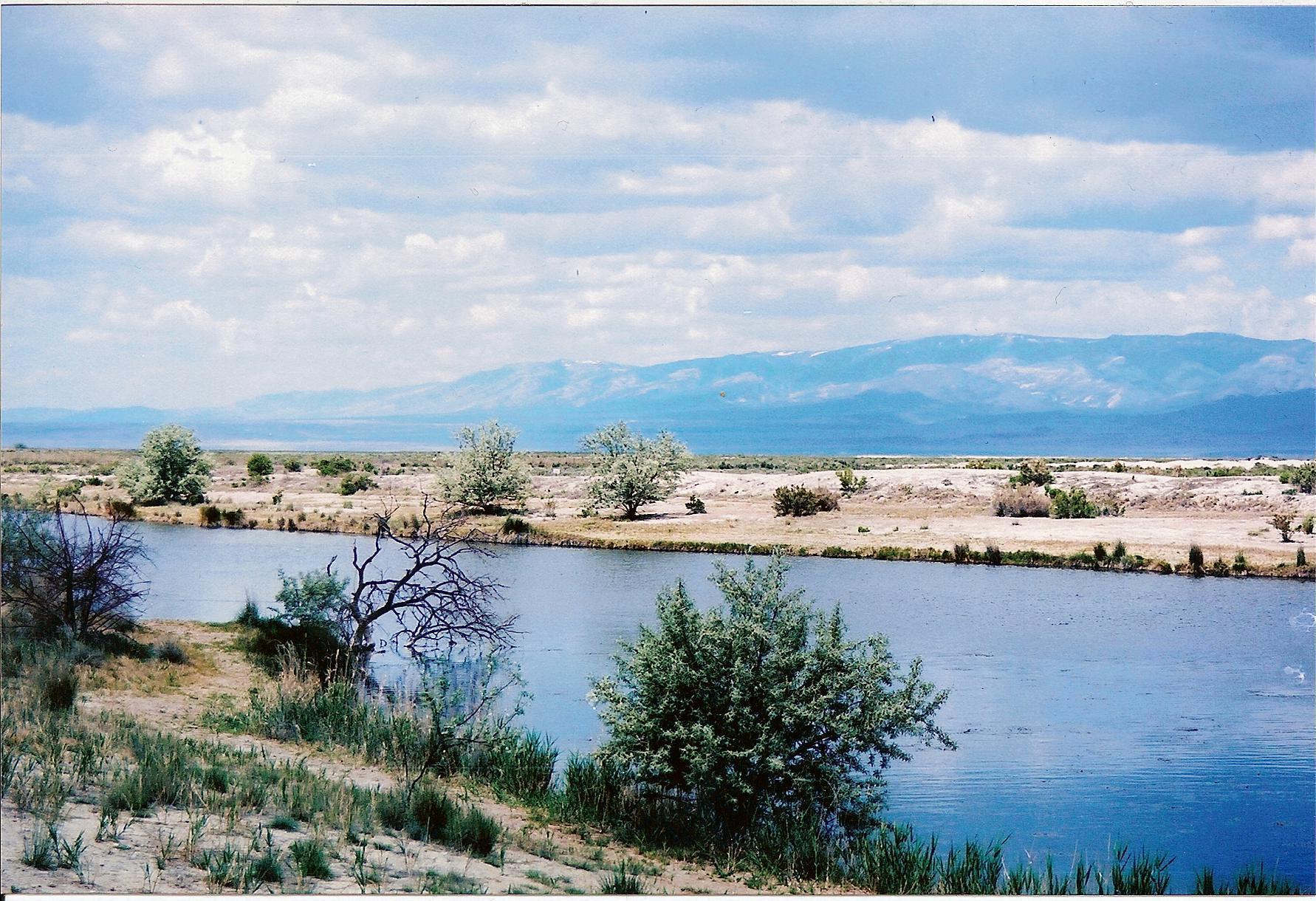
Locomotive Springs Wildlife Management Area

Locomotive Springs Wildlife Management Area is a protected area in Utah, United States.
