= Bothwell, Utah =

Unincorporated community in the state of Utah, United States

- Unincorporated community
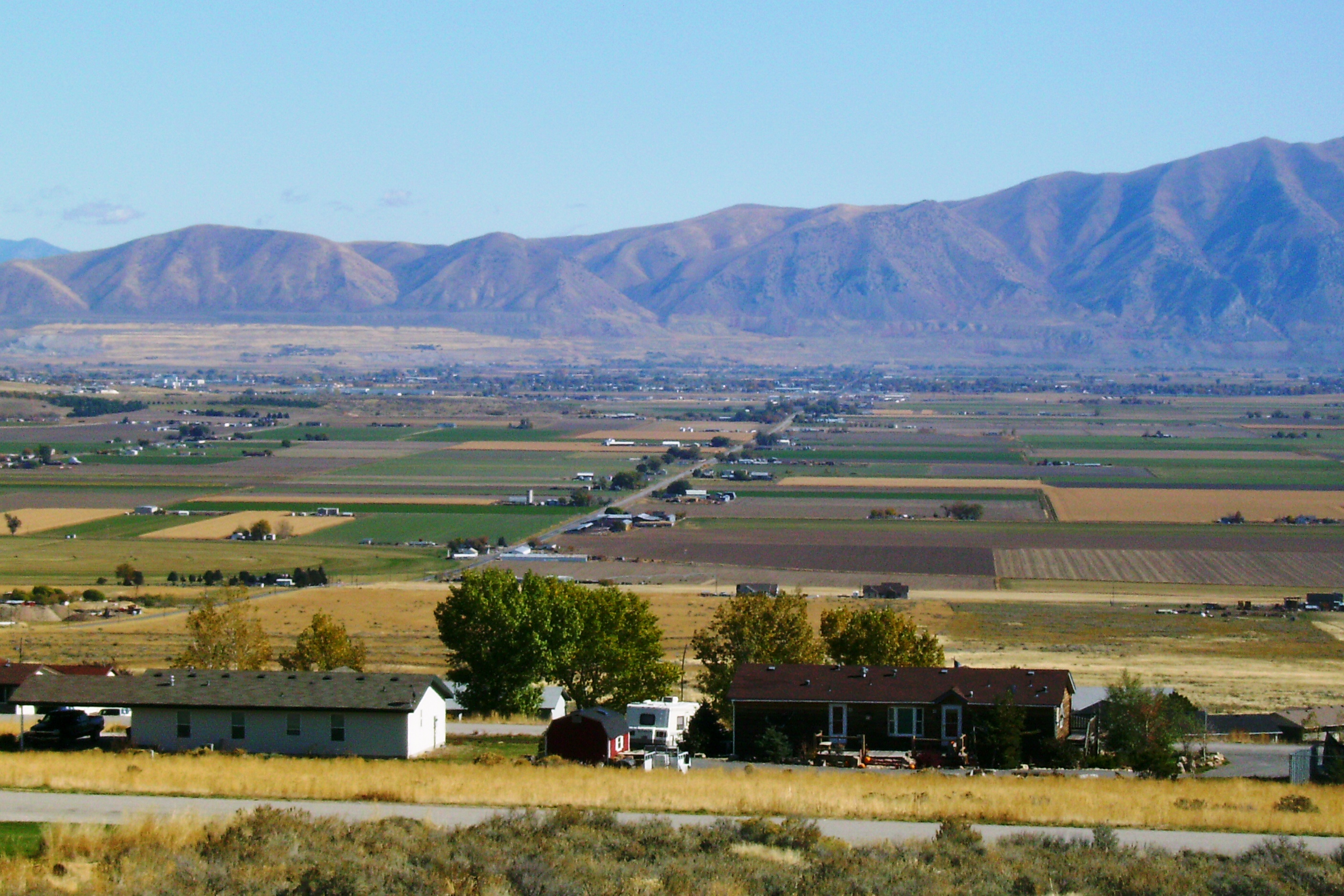
- Bothwell and the Bear River Valley, October 2009

- Location OF Bothwell Bothwell (the United States)
- Coordinates: 41°42′30″N 112°15′30″W
- Country: United States
- State: Utah
- County: Box Elder
- Settled: 1894
- Incorporated: 1937
- Disincorporated: 1967
- Founder: William H. Rowe
- Named for: John R. Bothwell
- Elevation: 4,331 ft (1,320 m)
- Time zone: UTC-7 (Mountain (MST))
  - Summer (DST): UTC-6 (MDT)
- GNIS feature ID: 1425891

Bothwell is an unincorporated community in the Bear River Valley in eastern Box Elder County, Utah, United States.

== Description ==
Historical population
Census	Pop.	Note	%±
1940	282		—
1950	317		12.4%
1960	302		−4.7%
Source: U.S. Census Bureau

Located on highway State Route 102, the community is 4.5 miles (7.2 km) west of Tremonton and 3 miles (4.8 km) northeast of Thatcher.

Bothwell was founded as a farming community in 1894. It was originally named Rowville, after Mormon pioneer William H. Rowe. It was renamed Bothwell in 1918, to honor the builders of the Bothwell Canal, a project that aided farming in the area by bringing irrigation water from the Bear River. John R. Bothwell was president of the waterworks at that time.

Bothwell voted to incorporate as a town in 1937, in order to issue municipal bonds to develop the culinary water system. It was disincorporated sometime in the 1960s.
