= Thatcher, Utah =

- Census-designated place
- Location in Box Elder County and the state of Utah

- Location of Utah in the United States
- Coordinates: 41°40′53″N 112°19′12″W
- Country: United States
- State: Utah
- County: Box Elder
- Settled: 1890
- Named for: Moses Thatcher

Area
  - Total: 11.7 sq mi (30.3 km^{2})
  - Land: 11.7 sq mi (30.3 km^{2})
  - Water: 0 sq mi (0.0 km^{2})
- Elevation: 5,013 ft (1,528 m)

Population (2020)
  - Total: 807
  - Density: 69.0/sq mi (26.6/km^{2})
- Time zone: UTC-7 (Mountain (MST))
  - Summer (DST): UTC-6 (MDT)
- ZIP code: 84337
- Area code: 435
- GNIS feature ID: 2584779

Thatcher is a census-designated place in Box Elder County, Utah, United States. It is a small farming community, located 3 miles (5 km) southwest of Bothwell and 7 miles (11 km) west of Tremonton. The population was 807 at the 2020 census.

The community was named for Moses Thatcher, an apostle for the Church of Jesus Christ of Latter-day Saints. Thatcher was first settled in 1890.

Thatcher Mountain, 2 miles (3 km) to the west, is named after the community.

== Demographics ==
Historical population
Census	Pop.	Note	%±
2010	789		—
2020	807		2.3%

As of the census of 2010, there were 789 people living in the CDP. There were 230 housing units. The racial makeup of the town was 95.9% White, 0.5% Black or African American, 0.1% American Indian and Alaska Native, 0.1% Asian, 0.1% Native Hawaiian and Other Pacific Islander, 1.6% from some other race, and 1.5% from two or more races. Hispanic or Latino of any race were 2.4% of the population.

== See also ==
- List of census-designated places in Utah
