= Honeyville, Utah =

City in Utah, United States

- City
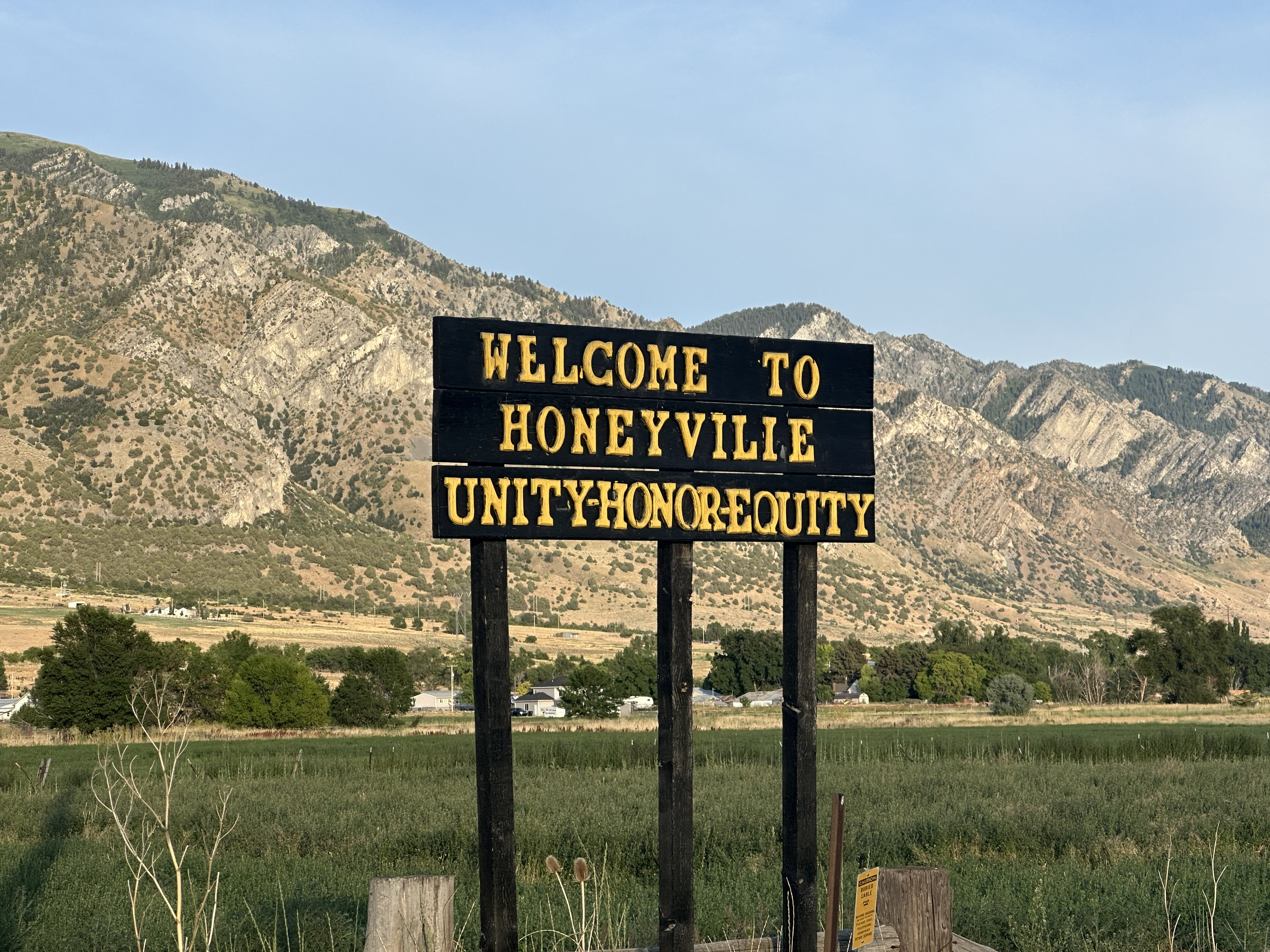
- Motto(s): "Unity, Honor, Equity"
- Location in Box Elder County and the State of Utah

- Location of Utah in the United States
- Coordinates: 41°37′50″N 112°05′25″W
- Country: United States
- State: Utah
- County: Box Elder
- Settled: 1861
- Incorporated: July 8, 1911
- City: January 1, 1980

Area
  - Total: 11.75 sq mi (30.42 km^{2})
  - Land: 11.75 sq mi (30.42 km^{2})
  - Water: 0 sq mi (0.00 km^{2})
- Elevation: 4,269 ft (1,301 m)

Population (2020)
  - Total: 1,606
  - Density: 136.7/sq mi (52.79/km^{2})
- Time zone: UTC-7 (Mountain (MST))
  - Summer (DST): UTC-6 (MDT)
- ZIP code: 84314
- Area code: 435
- FIPS code: 49-36290
- GNIS feature ID: 2410786
- Website: honeyvillecity.gov

Honeyville is a city near the eastern edge of Box Elder County, Utah, United States. The population was 1,606 as of the 2020 census.

== History ==
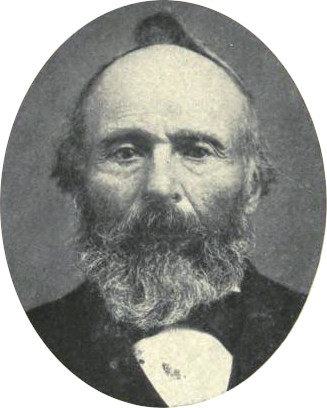
Abraham Hunsaker, mill owner and first LDS bishop of Honeyville

Honeyville was first established in 1861 when a ferry was put across the Bear River at this location. In that same year Anson Call built a sawmill in Honeyville. He later sold the mill to Abraham Hunsaker. The place was known as Hunsaker's Mill until it was organized as an LDS ward named Honeyville in 1877. Hunsaker was the branch president at Hunsaker's Mill and then the bishop of the Honeyville Ward until 1889.

== Geography ==
Honeyville is located in eastern Box Elder County and is bordered by Deweyville to the north, by the Bear River to the west, by Calls Fort to the south, and by the Rocky Mountains to the east.

Interstate highways 15 and 84 run through the western side of the city, with access from Exit 372. Ogden is 28 miles (45 km) to the south.

According to the United States Census Bureau, Honeyville has a total area of 11.8 square miles (30.6 km^{2}), all land.

== Demographics ==
Historical population
Census	Pop.	Note	%±
1920	436		—
1930	494		13.3%
1940	596		20.6%
1950	599		0.5%
1960	646		7.8%
1970	640		−0.9%
1980	915		43.0%
1990	1,112		21.5%
2000	1,214		9.2%
2010	1,441		18.7%
2020	1,606		11.5%
U.S. Decennial Census

=== 2020 census ===
As of the 2020 census, Honeyville had a population of 1,606. The median age was 37.6 years. 29.6% of residents were under the age of 18 and 13.7% of residents were 65 years of age or older. For every 100 females there were 106.7 males, and for every 100 females age 18 and over there were 104.5 males age 18 and over.

0.0% of residents lived in urban areas, while 100.0% lived in rural areas.

There were 511 households in Honeyville, of which 40.9% had children under the age of 18 living in them. Of all households, 71.4% were married-couple households, 13.1% were households with a male householder and no spouse or partner present, and 12.5% were households with a female householder and no spouse or partner present. About 14.6% of all households were made up of individuals and 6.6% had someone living alone who was 65 years of age or older.

There were 523 housing units, of which 2.3% were vacant. The homeowner vacancy rate was 0.2% and the rental vacancy rate was 0.0%.

Racial composition as of the 2020 census
Race	Number	Percent
White	1,458	90.8%
Black or African American	10	0.6%
American Indian and Alaska Native	7	0.4%
Asian	12	0.7%
Native Hawaiian and Other Pacific Islander	9	0.6%
Some other race	39	2.4%
Two or more races	71	4.4%
Hispanic or Latino (of any race)	100	6.2%

=== 2000 census ===
As of the census of 2000, there were 1,214 people, 358 households, and 308 families residing in the city. The population density was 103.3 people per square mile (39.9/km^{2}). There were 378 housing units at an average density of 32.2 per square mile (12.4/km^{2}). The racial makeup of the city was 94.32% White, 0.08% Native American, 2.80% Asian, 1.48% from other races, and 1.32% from two or more races. Hispanic or Latino of any race were 5.27% of the population.

There were 358 households, out of which 48.0% had children under the age of 18 living with them, 74.0% were married couples living together, 8.9% had a female householder with no husband present, and 13.7% were non-families. 12.3% of all households were made up of individuals, and 5.9% had someone living alone who was 65 years of age or older. The average household size was 3.39 and the average family size was 3.72.

In the city, the population was spread out, with 36.7% under the age of 18, 9.6% from 18 to 24, 24.4% from 25 to 44, 18.1% from 45 to 64, and 11.2% who were 65 years of age or older. The median age was 30 years. For every 100 females, there were 103.7 males. For every 100 females age 18 and over, there were 100.3 males.

The median income for a household in the city was $41,618, and the median income for a family was $46,786. Males had a median income of $35,625 versus $21,250 for females. The per capita income for the city was $15,050. About 5.0% of families and 6.4% of the population were below the poverty line, including 6.6% of those under age 18 and 2.9% of those age 65 or over.

== Schools ==
In May 2000, Honeyville Elementary was shut down and merged with Century Elementary, located in Bear River City. There are currently no operating schools in Honeyville.

== See also ==
- List of cities and towns in Utah
