= Snowville, Utah =

Town in the state of Utah, United States

- Town
- Location in Box Elder County and the state of Utah.

- Location of Utah in the United States
- Coordinates: 41°58′22″N 112°42′59″W
- Country: United States
- State: Utah
- County: Box Elder
- Settled: 1871
- Incorporated: November 6, 1933
- Named for: Lorenzo Snow

Government
  - Type: Council - Mayor

Area
  - Total: 1.55 sq mi (4.02 km^{2})
  - Land: 1.55 sq mi (4.02 km^{2})
  - Water: 0 sq mi (0.00 km^{2})
- Elevation: 4,515 ft (1,376 m)

Population (2020)
  - Total: 163
  - Density: 111.4/sq mi (43.01/km^{2})
- Time zone: UTC-7 (Mountain (MST))
  - Summer (DST): UTC-6 (MDT)
- ZIP code: 84336
- Area code: 435
- FIPS code: 49-69970
- GNIS feature ID: 2413303
- Website: snowvilletown.gov

Snowville is a town in Box Elder County, Utah, United States. The population was 163 at the 2020 census.

== Geography ==
According to the United States Census Bureau, the town has a total area of 1.5 square miles (3.9 km^{2}), all land.

=== Climate ===
According to the Köppen Climate Classification system, Snowville has a warm-summer continental climate (Dfb).

Climate data for Snowville, Utah, 1893–1991
Month	Jan	Feb	Mar	Apr	May	Jun	Jul	Aug	Sep	Oct	Nov	Dec	Year
Mean daily maximum °F (°C)	33.6 (0.9)	39.0 (3.9)	47.6 (8.7)	59.5 (15.3)	68.5 (20.3)	79.7 (26.5)	89.9 (32.2)	88.0 (31.1)	77.6 (25.3)	64.6 (18.1)	48.3 (9.1)	36.5 (2.5)	61.1 (16.2)
Mean daily minimum °F (°C)	9.6 (−12.4)	14.5 (−9.7)	22.1 (−5.5)	28.7 (−1.8)	35.9 (2.2)	42.1 (5.6)	49.8 (9.9)	48.1 (8.9)	38.3 (3.5)	29.0 (−1.7)	21.1 (−6.1)	12.3 (−10.9)	29.3 (−1.5)
Average precipitation inches (mm)	1.10 (28)	0.78 (20)	1.12 (28)	1.18 (30)	1.64 (42)	1.08 (27)	0.60 (15)	0.68 (17)	0.78 (20)	0.95 (24)	1.13 (29)	1.05 (27)	12.09 (307)
Average snowfall inches (cm)	9.1 (23)	4.9 (12)	3.5 (8.9)	1.0 (2.5)	0.2 (0.51)	0.0 (0.0)	0.0 (0.0)	0.0 (0.0)	0.0 (0.0)	0.1 (0.25)	3.8 (9.7)	5.5 (14)	28.0 (71)
Average precipitation days (≥ 0.01 in)	6	5	6	6	7	5	3	3	4	4	6	6	62
Source: WRCC

== Demographics ==
Historical population
Census	Pop.	Note	%±
1880	197		—
1890	175		−11.2%
1900	183		4.6%
1910	256		39.9%
1920	249		−2.7%
1930	342		37.3%
1940	195		−43.0%
1950	199		2.1%
1960	159		−20.1%
1970	174		9.4%
1980	237		36.2%
1990	251		5.9%
2000	177		−29.5%
2010	167		−5.6%
2020	163		−2.4%
U.S. Decennial Census

As of the census of 2000, there were 177 people, 59 households, and 46 families residing in the town. The population density was 115.4 people per square mile (44.7/km^{2}). There were 71 housing units at an average density of 46.3 per square mile (17.9/km^{2}). The racial makeup of the town was 88.70% White, 0.56% Asian, 9.60% from other races, and 1.13% from two or more races. Hispanic or Latino of any race were 19.21% of the population.

There were 59 households, out of which 47.5% had children under the age of 18 living with them, 62.7% were married couples living together, 10.2% had a female householder with no husband present, and 22.0% were non-families. 20.3% of all households were made up of individuals, and 10.2% had someone living alone who was 65 years of age or older. The average household size was 3.00 and the average family size was 3.52.

In the town, the population was spread out, with 29.9% under the age of 18, 15.3% from 18 to 24, 24.3% from 25 to 44, 20.3% from 45 to 64, and 10.2% who were 65 years of age or older. The median age was 28 years. For every 100 females, there were 96.7 males. For every 100 females age 18 and over, there were 96.8 males.

The median income for a household in the town was $24,375, and the median income for a family was $35,750. Males had a median income of $36,250 versus $35,250 for females. The per capita income for the town was $13,604. None of the families and 4.8% of the population were living below the poverty line, including no under eighteens and 54.5% of those over 64.

== History ==
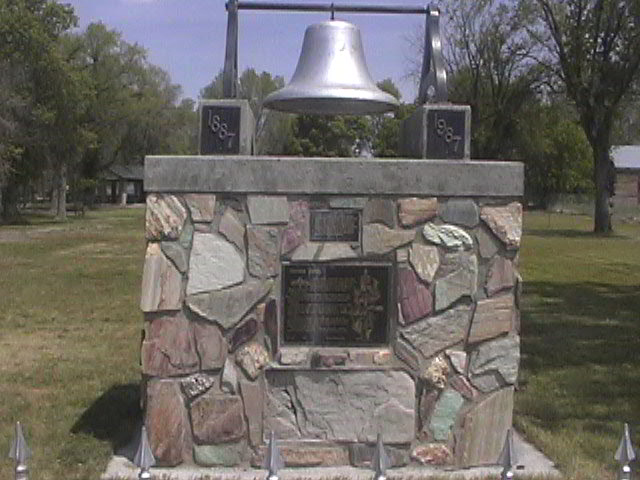
Curlew Valley Settler's Bell at the Snowville City Park.

Curlew Valley, named after the curlew snipe that nests there, extends from Snowville, Utah, to the Idaho towns of Stone and Holbrook. The first recorded settlers were Peter Skene Ogden's large party of trappers that camped on Deep Creek December 27, 1828. Some of the discharged members of the Mormon Battalion, on their way home from California to Salt Lake City on September 18, 1848, camped on Deep Creek and also in a cave one mile (1.6 km) east called Hollow Rock. The beginning of Deep Creek is a large spring at Holbrook which runs through the center of the valley and has never varied even in dry years. About one mile (1.6 km) southwest is Rocky Ford, where the pioneers were able to pass on solid rock. In 1869, William Robbins, Thomas Showell, and William M. Harris settled at the Curlew Sinks, ten miles (16 km) west of here, where Deep Creek sinks into the ground. The old pioneer trail and the stage line went through their ranch. The first townsite in the Curlew Valley was Snowville. Settled at the direction of Brigham Young, the community was named in honor of Lorenzo Snow, an apostle who became President of the Church of Jesus Christ of Latter-day Saints from 1898 to 1901.

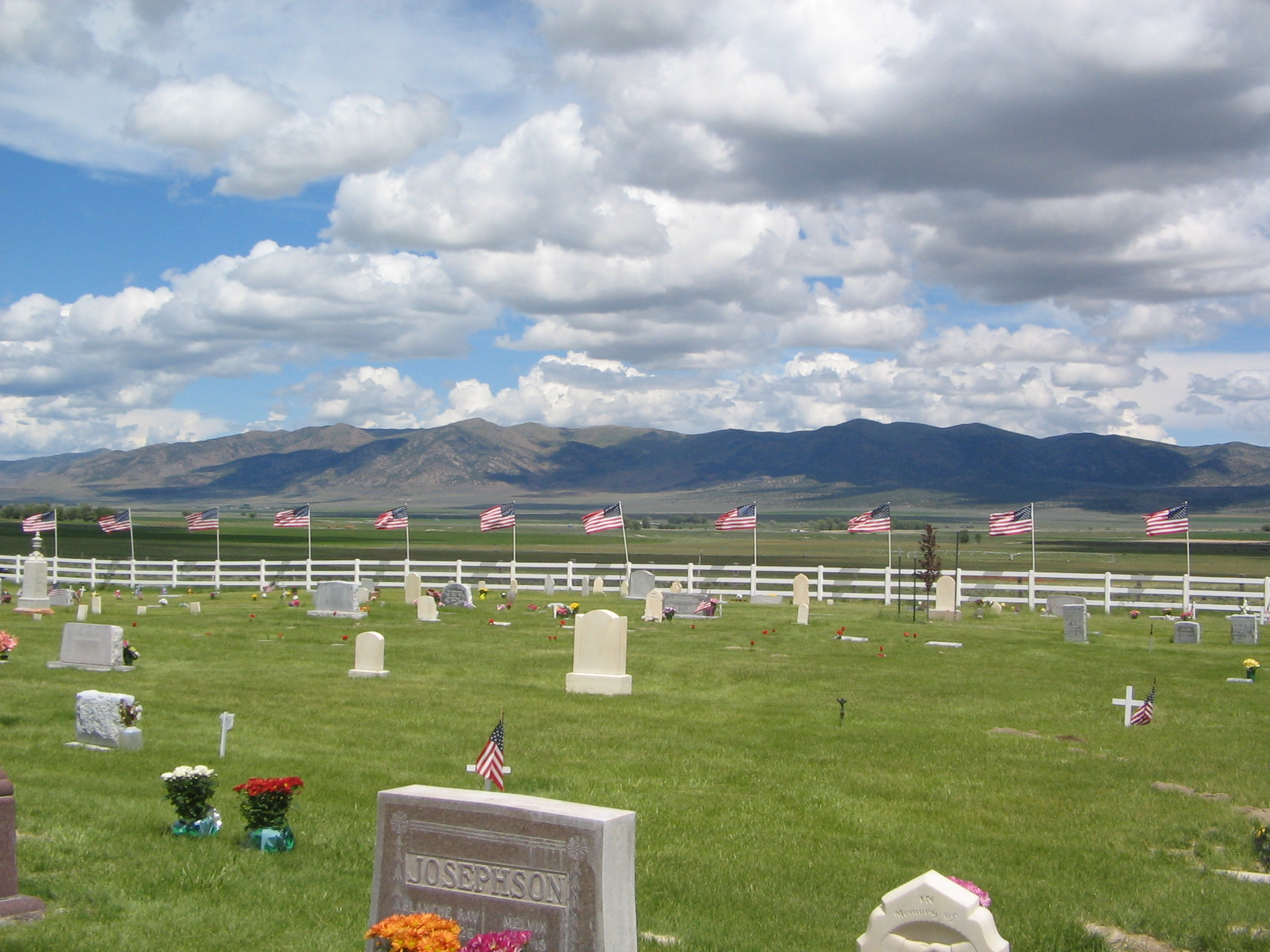
Snowville Cemetery

== Cemetery ==
The Snowville Cemetery is located at 750 North 600 West in Snowville, Utah. The earliest burial was of William O'Donald, who died on May 27, 1869. As of 2004, there are 540 burials on 10 acres (40,000 m^{2}) owned by the town of Snowville. Two unknown soldiers are buried in the cemetery as well as William Robbins, the first settler of the valley and a veteran of the American Civil War.

== See also ==
- List of cities and towns in Utah
