= Thistle, Utah =

- Ghost town
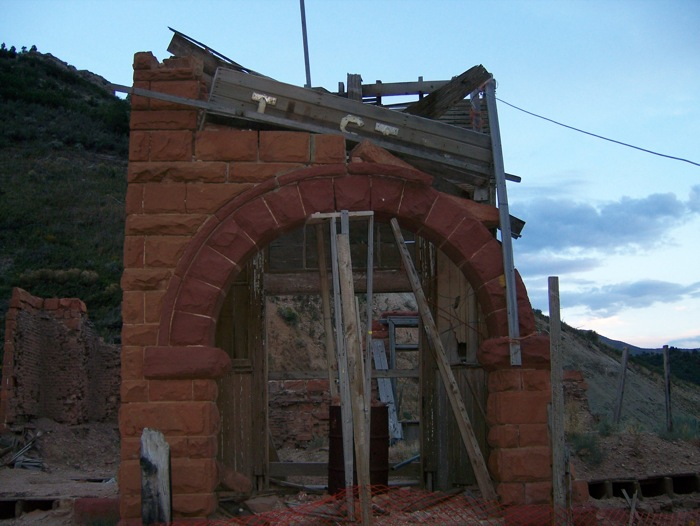
- Remnants of the Thistle schoolhouse, September 2006

- Location of Thistle within the State of Utah Thistle (the United States)
- Coordinates: 39°59′29″N 111°29′54″W
- Country: United States
- State: Utah
- County: Utah
- Destroyed: 1983
- Named for: Thistle
- Elevation: 5,043 ft (1,537 m)
- Zip code: 84629
- GNIS feature ID: 1439662

Thistle is a ghost town in Spanish Fork Canyon in southeastern Utah County, Utah, United States. During the era of steam locomotives, the town's primary industry was servicing trains for the Denver and Rio Grande Western Railroad (often shortened to D&RG, D&RGW, or Rio Grande). The fortunes of the town were closely linked with those of the railroad until the changeover to diesel locomotives, when the town started to decline.

In April 1983, a massive landslide (specifically a complex earthflow) dammed the Spanish Fork River. The residents were evacuated as nearly 65,000 acre-feet (80,000,000 m^{3}) of water backed up, flooding the town. Thistle was destroyed; only a few structures were left partially standing. Federal and state government agencies have said this was the most costly landslide in United States history, the economic consequences of which affected the entire region. The landslide resulted in the first presidentially declared disaster area in Utah.

U.S. Route 6 (US‑6), U.S. Route 89 (US‑89) and the railroad (now part of Union Pacific Railroad's Central Corridor) were closed for several months, until they were rebuilt on a higher alignment overlooking the area. The remains of Thistle are visible from a view area along US‑89 or from the California Zephyr passenger train.

== Geography ==
Thistle is about 65 miles (105 km) southeast of Salt Lake City, at the confluence of the two primary tributaries to the Spanish Fork River, Thistle Creek and Soldier Creek. This confluence, at an elevation of 5,043 feet (1,537 m), is also the junction of two naturally formed routes across the mountains of central Utah. The primary route crosses the Wasatch Mountains, via the Wasatch Plateau and Soldier Summit. This route was carved by the tributaries of the Price River on the eastern side of the mountains and the Spanish Fork on the west. In addition, Thistle Creek provides a route south from Thistle towards the communities of the Sanpete and Sevier valleys. The Spanish Fork flows northwest from Thistle, towards and through the city of Spanish Fork, before reaching Utah Lake.

These natural paths have provided the route of several transcontinental trails, highways and railroads since their discovery. The named transportation arteries passing through Thistle include: US‑6 (originally numbered US-50), US‑89, the Denver and Rio Grande Western Railroad's Utah Division (now part of Union Pacific Railroad's Central Corridor) and D&RGW's Marysvale Branch line (abandoned because of the landslide).

== History ==
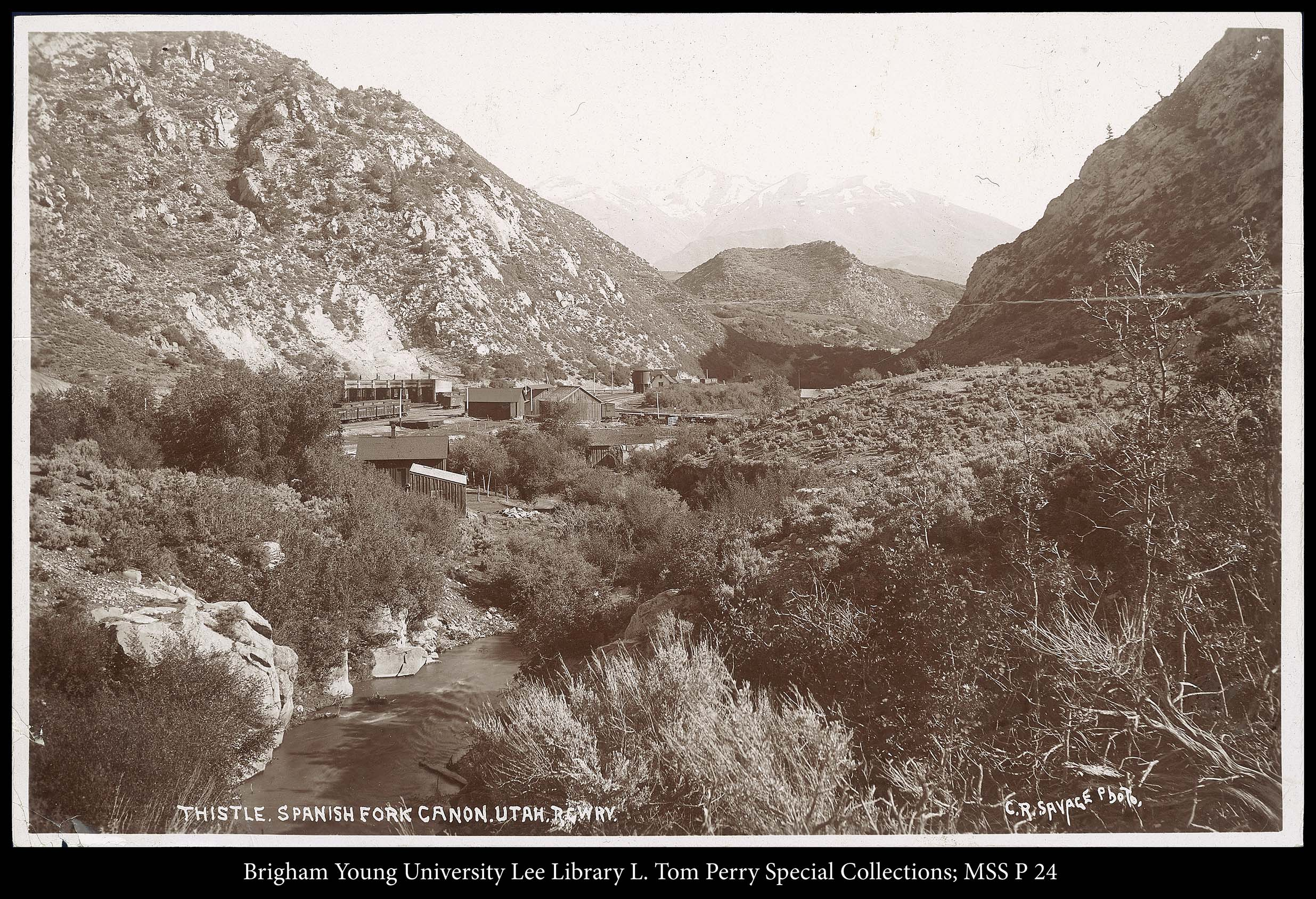
Thistle around 1871

The trade route on which Thistle lies was used by Indian tribes before the arrival of European settlers; two Timpanogos chiefs, Taby and Peteetneet, led tribal migrations through the canyon each spring and fall. The first recorded journey by Europeans to modern Thistle was the Domínguez–Escalante expedition, which explored the territory with Indian guides in 1776.

Most of Thistle's residents were railroad employees sent to live in the town, but there were some who had settled before the railroads arrived. The first settlers were part of the Mormon migration to Utah, and the first of these was the Pace family, who migrated from Nauvoo, Illinois, reaching Thistle in 1848. Fifth-generation descendants of the Pace settlers continued to operate a family-owned cattle ranch until the town was evacuated. Other settlers included Mormons who originally settled elsewhere in Utah but subsequently arrived to homestead fertile ground on Billies Mountain, on the north wall of the canyon. Among them was the mountain's presumed namesake, William Johnson. A small group of Utes inhabiting the canyon frequently raided the newcomers, and as a result were forcibly relocated in the 1870s.

Historical population
Census	Pop.	Note	%±
1880	81		—
1890	365		350.6%
1900	187		−48.8%
1910	409		118.7%
1920	417		2.0%
1930	288		−30.9%
1940	318		10.4%
1950	248		−22.0%
Source: U.S. Census Bureau

Homesteading was practiced in Thistle until the early 1900s. Until the arrival of the railroads, the town's economy was based mainly on farming and ranching, although there was also some mining activity in the region, including a vein of asphaltum that was mined between 1892 and 1914.

=== Railroads ===
The first railroad track laid through Thistle was a narrow-gauge spur line servicing coal mines near today's Scofield Reservoir, built in 1878 by the Utah and Pleasant Valley Railway. By 1890, the Denver and Rio Grande Western, which acquired the line in a foreclosure sale in 1882, had rebuilt the line to standard gauge. The D&RGW connected this line with one they had built west from Colorado, completing a link from Salt Lake City to Denver.

The railroad built several facilities in Thistle to service and prepare trains for the change in grade and curvature of the line. The railroad placed helper engines on eastbound trains at Thistle for the ascent to Soldier Summit. The town provided a meal service for the trains until the use of on-board dining cars eliminated the need for meal stops.

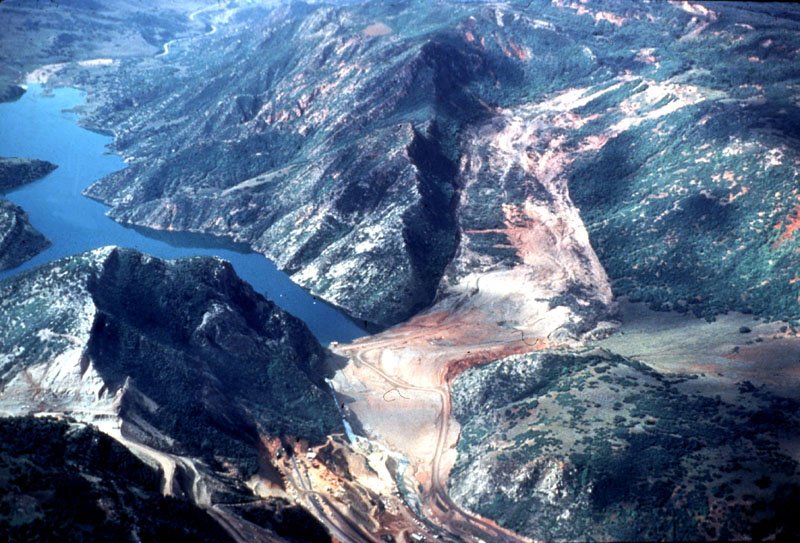
Aerial photo of the Thistle area in spring 1983 showing the dam formed by the landslide, "Lake Thistle" over the submerged town, and the construction to re-route US-6, US-89, and the D&RGW around the landslide area

Thistle saw more rail traffic with the construction of the Marysvale Branch line. This line branched from the main at Thistle, following modern US‑89 towards mines near Marysvale. Another line through Thistle, paralleling the D&RGW main, was built by the Utah Railway. The two lines were later combined into a dual-track main line as part of a trackage rights agreement between the two companies.

Rail traffic through Thistle continued to increase as the Rio Grande cooperated with connecting railroads, making the rail line through Thistle a bridge line for transcontinental rail traffic. The growth of Thistle was closely tied to the success of the Denver and Rio Grande Railroad throughout the era of steam locomotives.

At its peak, around 1917, Thistle had about 600 residents. The town's railroad infrastructure included a five-stall roundhouse, depot, machine shop, and structures to restock passing trains with sand, coal and water. Non-railroad infrastructure included general stores, a post office, barber shop, saloon, pool hall, bakeries and restaurants. The largest building was a two-story schoolhouse, built in 1911.

In the 1950s, the Denver & Rio Grande Western began to phase out steam locomotives in favor of diesel locomotives, which require less maintenance. With the change in technology, Thistle faded in importance. Gradually the town shrank in population; the passenger depot was torn down in 1972 and the post office closed in 1974. Thistle was listed in a book of Utah ghost towns published 1972, with the author noting most of the remaining buildings were abandoned with a handful of permanent residents in the city. By 1983, only a few families remained in Thistle.

=== Landslide ===
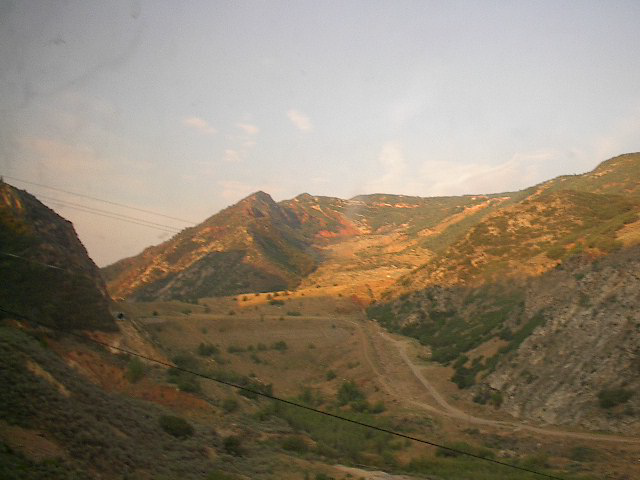
A view from the California Zephyr, after the slide, showing the dam formed by the landslide and the scar from where the dirt slid, August 2003

Rio Grande maintenance personnel began noticing unstable ground downstream from Thistle years before the landslide occurred. Maintenance crews repaired the track on several occasions, but they did not fully investigate the problem. Beginning with the remnants of Hurricane Olivia, the autumn and winter of 1982–83 featured record-breaking snow and rainfall. As the spring thaw melted the winter snow, the mountains in the area became saturated with water.

By April 1983, track deformation was a serious issue. On April 13, the division track master flew to Denver to explain the situation at a specially-called staff meeting. On the same day, a Utah Highway Patrol officer struck a newly created buckle in the highway that threw him against the roof of his vehicle. By the end of the day, a full maintenance crew was struggling to keep US‑6/US‑89 open. All trains were limited to speeds less than 10 miles per hour (16 km/h), and were accompanied by maintenance personnel who had to continually work to keep the tracks in line. The last train to pass through downtown Thistle was the westbound Rio Grande Zephyr, on April 14, 1983 at about 8:30 p.m. That night, both US‑6/US‑89 and the rail line were closed. One westbound freight train that had already left Denver was turned back. All through trains between Denver and Salt Lake City were rerouted to Union Pacific Railroad's Overland Route through Wyoming. By April 16, the tracks were completely buried and a voluntary evacuation order was issued for the town.

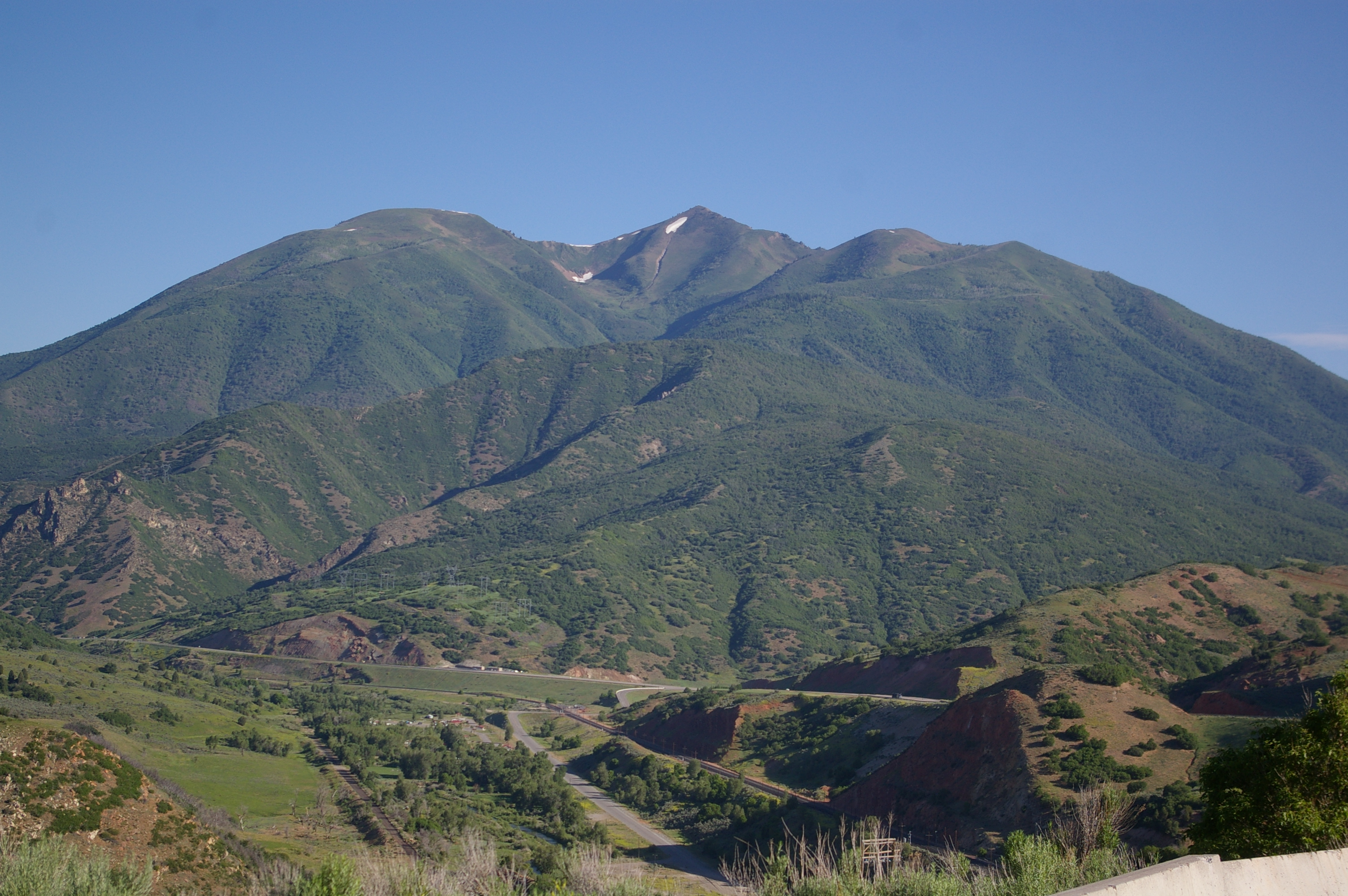
Looking northwest from the view area along US-6/US-89 showing the abandoned railroad and highway grades next to the replacement alignments, June 2010

On April 17, a final attempt to keep the landslide from blocking the flow of the river failed. That day, the Utah Department of Transportation and the Rio Grande announced plans to abandon the existing transportation arteries and build new corridors. Both the highway and railroad would be re-routed by blasting a path scaling the north wall of Spanish Fork Canyon. The new arteries would pass the slide by dynamiting through Billies Mountain, also along the north canyon wall. Engineers estimated the dam created by the toe of the landslide would eventually reach 200 to 300 feet (60 to 90 m) tall. The evacuation order was changed from voluntary to mandatory. Volunteers transported as many people and belongings as possible to the small town of Birdseye, about five miles (8 km) south. Most residents were able to recover only a fraction of their belongings; some had less than two hours' notice before the water reached their house. Thistle's oldest resident celebrated her 90th birthday at the evacuation center in Birdseye. By the 18th, the waterline had reached the rooftops of the 22 previously occupied houses. By the 19th, an entire mountain was moving at about two feet (0.6 m) per hour, and US‑6/US‑89 was buried by 50 feet (15 m) of soil.

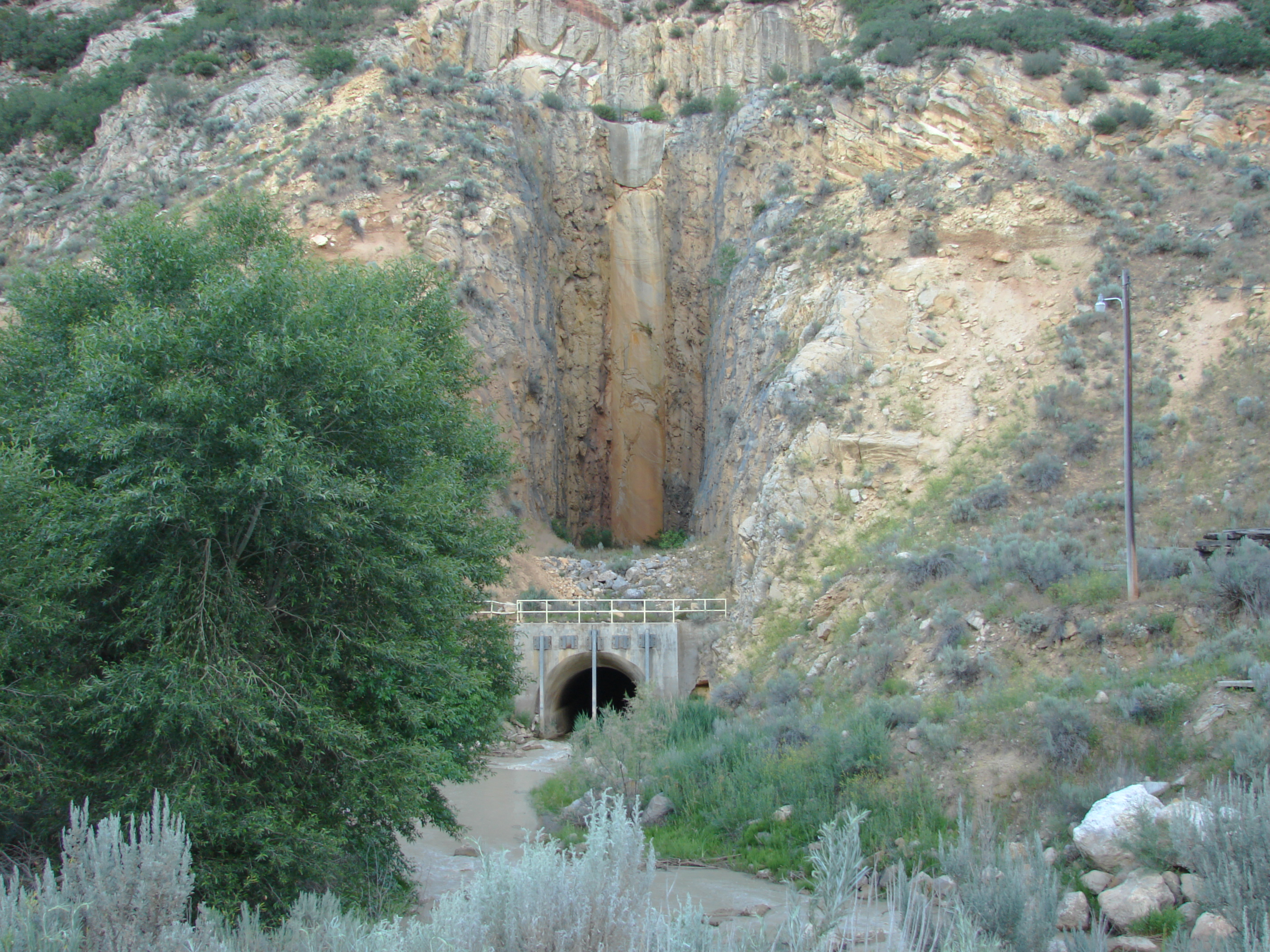
The intake for the tunnel which rerouted the Spanish Fork River past the dam formed by the Thistle landslide, July 2015

Governor Scott Matheson requested federal aid to deal with the situation. After a visit to the area by the director of the Federal Emergency Management Agency, U.S. president Ronald Reagan issued the first presidential disaster area declaration for the state of Utah. The landslide eventually formed a dam that created a lake three miles (5 km) long and over 200 ft (60 m) deep. Concerned the dam could fail, the state of Utah decided to build a tunnel to re-route the flow of the river. The residents of downstream Spanish Fork were told to be prepared to evacuate. Engineers estimated that if the dam failed, they would have 30 to 45 minutes notice before the water reached the city.

=== Aftermath ===
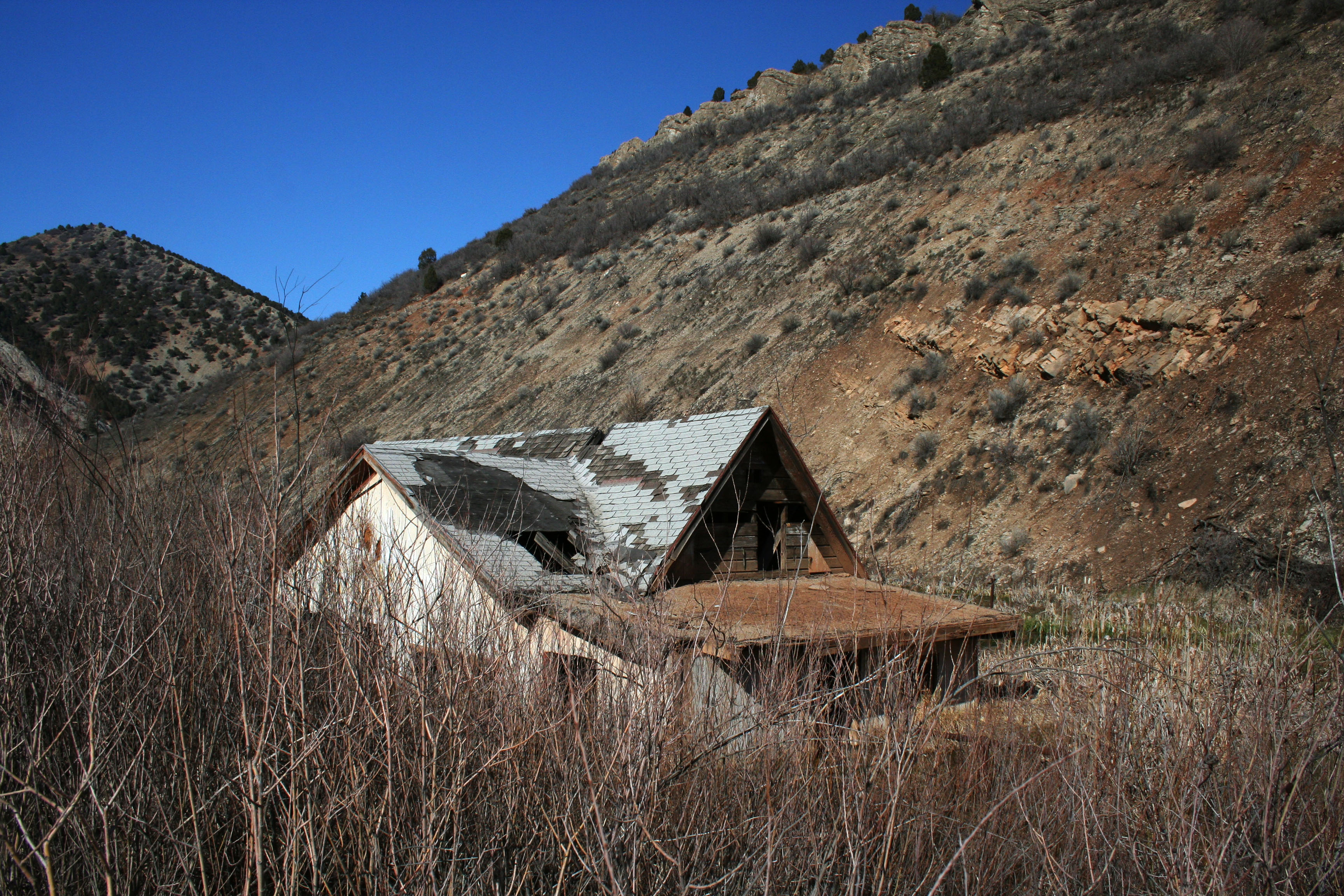
One of the few houses at Thistle to survive the landslide, April 2008

Thistle was almost completely destroyed. Most wooden buildings were carried away in the floodwaters. The state installed a temporary pumping station to prevent the lake from overflowing the dam; patrol boats skimmed up the floating remains of the town to prevent the debris from blocking the pumps. Most remains were either naturally deposited or placed on the eastern shore of the lake.

By autumn, the tunnels to restore the flow of the river and drain the lake were operational. Shortly after, debates among former residents, neighboring residents, and government agencies began on what to do with the dam created by the landslide; some wanted to make the lake permanent. The state engineer commissioned a study to determine if the landslide dam could be used to retain water; it recommended building a new dam upstream from the landslide, rather than attempting engineering work on the landslide dam.

In the years following, the former residents of Thistle filed various lawsuits to recover their losses. In one, they claimed that their property was taken to rebuild the road and railroad without just compensation. Another lawsuit claimed negligence on the part of the D&RGW. The residents argued that the railroad's maintenance workers knew the ground was unstable; however, they only repaired the track. The residents contended the slide could have been prevented by using a water drainage system to relieve pressure at the head of the unstable area. They further contended that such a system could have been put in place had the railroad thoroughly investigated the problem upon first noticing it. The engineering firm employed by the Rio Grande said that their studies indicated the crown of the landslide was about 300 feet (90 m) above the level of the tracks, and that the Rio Grande did not know the true size of the unstable area until the slide was in motion. A jury absolved the D&RGW of responsibility. The plaintiffs appealed the decision, and a second trial in 1993 resulted in a $1.1 million award for the landowners (equivalent to $3 million in 2025). The D&RGW filed suit against the Utah Railway over sharing the costs from the landslide. The Utah Railway had an ownership interest in the line, based on a track-sharing agreement.

==== Economic effects ====
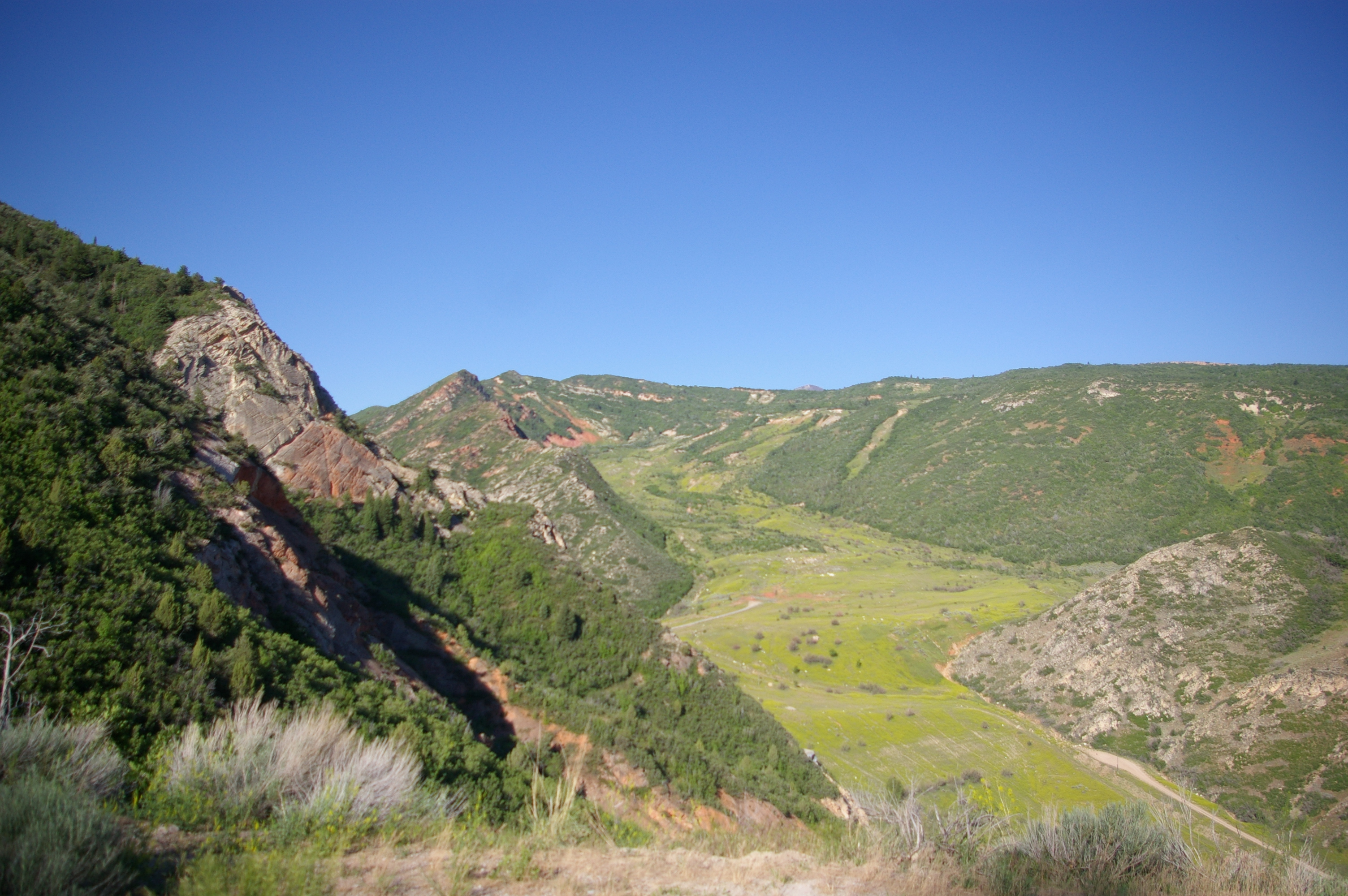
The Thistle landslide, as seen from a view area along US-6/US-89, June 2010

The landslide closed the main railroad for three months, and US‑6 and US‑89 for eight months, during which time transportation between the communities of eastern and southeastern Utah and the rest of the state was substantially impaired. Security for the isolated part of Utah County was temporarily assigned to the Utah Highway Patrol.

The economic effects of the closure of these transportation arteries were felt throughout the western United States; the closure devastated rural Utah. The operations of coal mines, uranium mines, turkey farms, animal feed companies, gypsum mines, and cement and clay factories were severely impacted. At least two trucking firms and one oil-producing firm suspended or ceased operations. Southeastern Utah's tourism industry suffered without access for visitors from the north and west. Some people who lived and worked on opposite sides of the landslide area suddenly had commutes exceeding 100 miles (160 km). The highway patrol temporarily closed a weigh station at Peerless (a location along the US‑6 corridor near Helper) and built a temporary weigh station near Salina (along I-70 about 90 miles (140 km) south of Thistle), which saw a sudden increase in truck traffic. The highway patrol estimated the temporary facilities inspected 57,000 trucks and made 80 arrests.

The direct cost of the landslide was estimated at $200 million (equivalent to $647 million in 2025). However, some estimates of the total cost reached as high as $400 million (equivalent to $1293 million in 2025). The D&RGW estimated the slide cost them $80 million in lost revenue (equivalent to $259 million in 2025), averaging $1 million for each day that the tracks were out-of-service. This figure included $19 million in payments to the Union Pacific for the use of their lines. The United States Geological Survey and the state of Utah have called the Thistle landslide the most costly ever in the United States.

==== Railroad ====
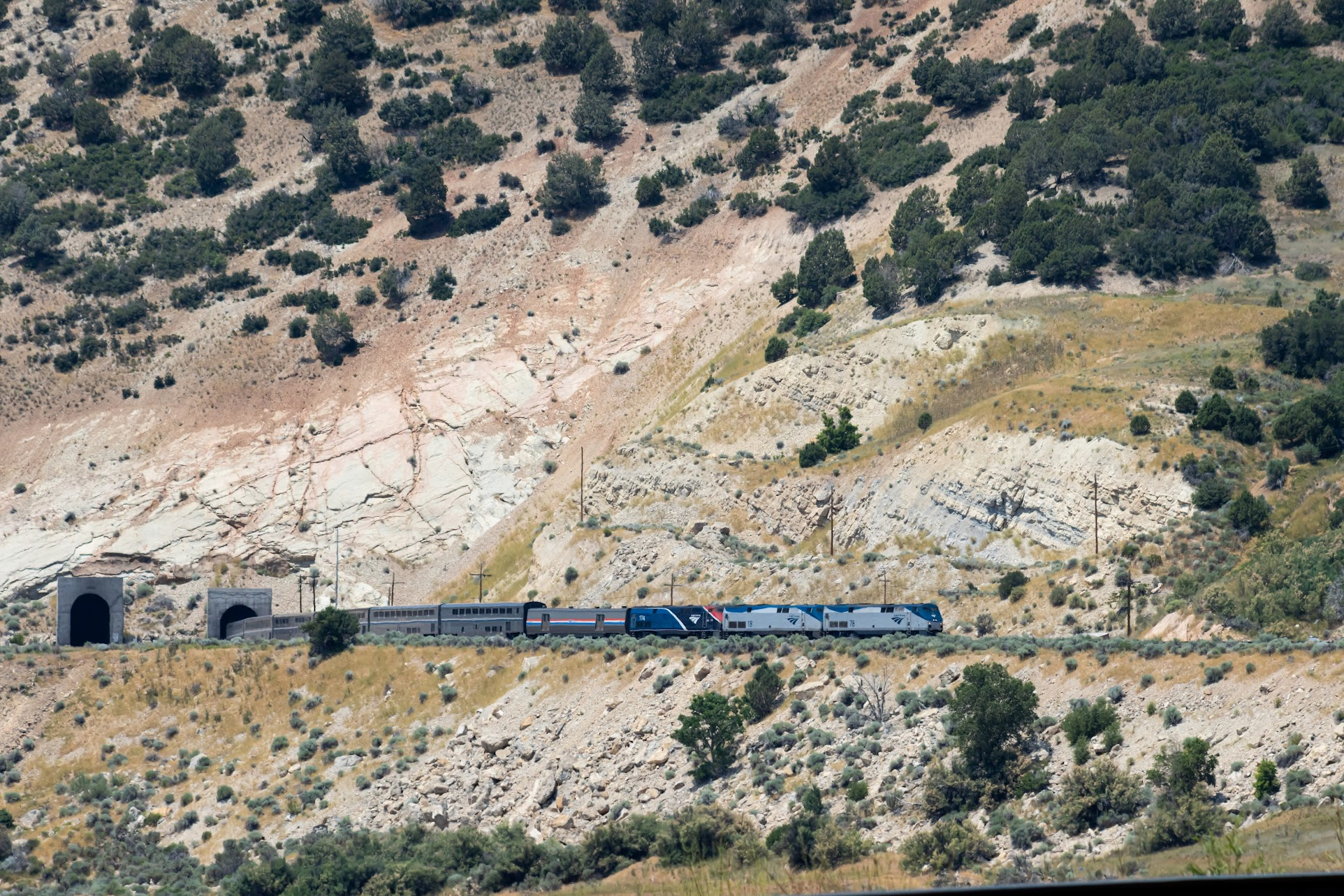
East end of Union Pacific Railroad's tunnels that bypassed the landslide in Thistle with a Late Amtrak going East, July 2024

To expedite construction, the railroad had crews in Utah focused on grading the new path and boring a 3,000-foot (910 m) tunnel, while crews in Colorado built track segments that were transported to site. On July 4, 1983, at 3:05 p.m., safety inspectors declared the line ready for operation. At 3:12 p.m., the centralized traffic control signals gave a green light to the first train to pass through the Thistle area since the slide began, an eastbound freight train coming from the Southern Pacific Railroad at Ogden, destined for Herington, Kansas. Although the line's re-opening on Independence Day was coincidental, the first train became part of the local holiday celebrations. The first passenger train to use the new alignment was the California Zephyr, on July 16.

Debates ensued over the fate of the Marysvale Branch line. The mines at the end of the line had long closed; the last train to traverse the entire length of the line passed through in 1970. Still, farmers and industry in the Sevier and Sanpete Valleys generated enough traffic that the line broke even most years. However, this line was severely damaged, with several washed-out bridges and railroad tracks draping over the sides of newly created cliffs. The railroad determined that at best it would take years to recover the cost of rebuilding the line.

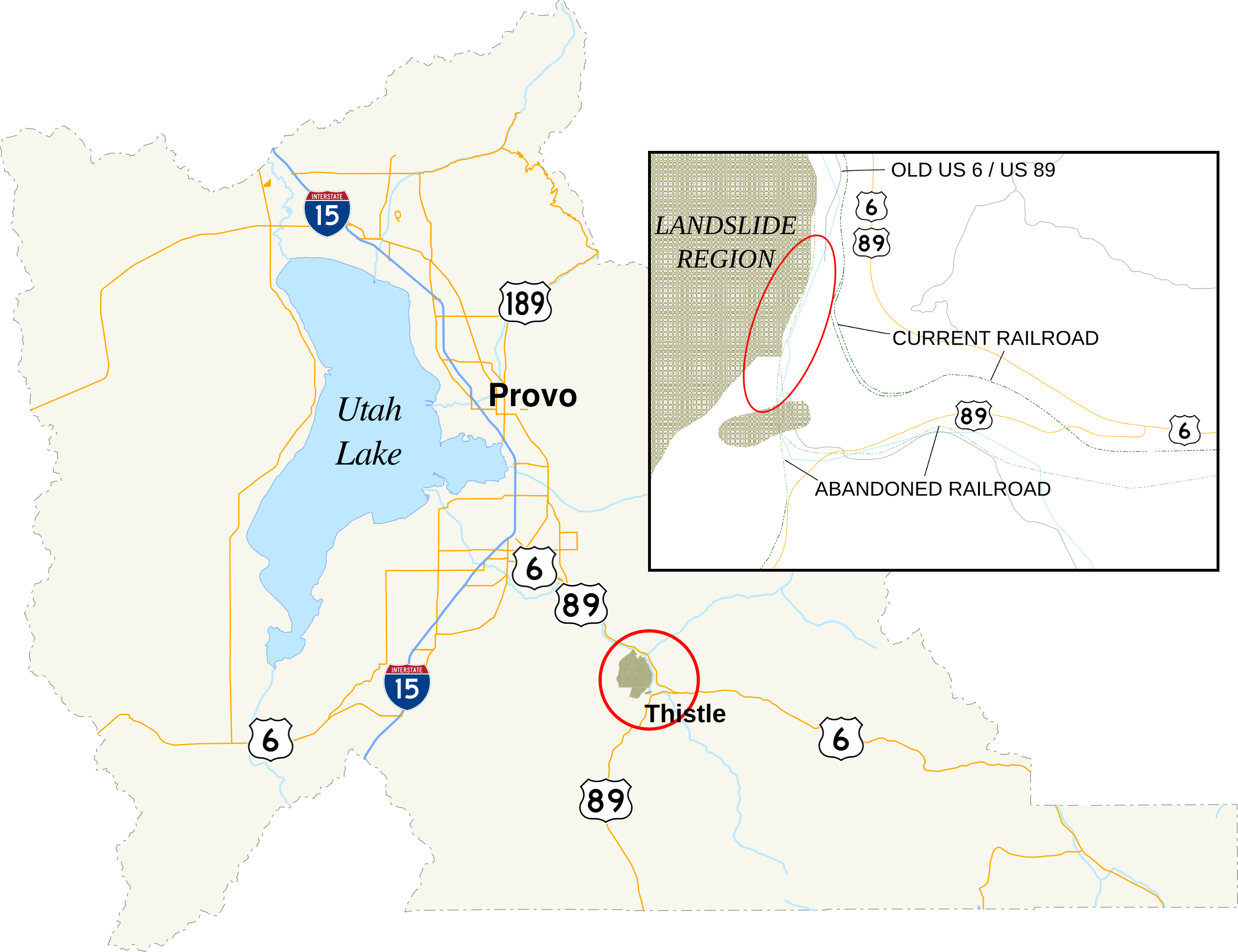
Map of Utah County showing the pre- and post-landslide alignments of US-6, US-89, and the area railroads

The residents of Richfield pressured the Rio Grande to use the portion of the line that was still intact and build a connection to an existing Union Pacific line (the Sharp Subdivision) near Nephi, roughly parallel to State Route 28. However, the railroad determined with the additional cost of acquiring land for the new right-of-way, the cost would be comparable to rebuilding the old route. In addition, the Rio Grande would have to pay trackage rights to the Union Pacific for the connection from Nephi, which would further erode profits on a line that was barely profitable. In the end, the Rio Grande sold the line to a scrap dealer who dismantled it. Since the line's closure, there have been multiple proposals to rebuild it. Studies note the loss of railroad access to the region has affected the ability of local industries to compete with producers in other regions that have rail access. A 2002 study placed the cost of rebuilding the modified routing of the Marysvale Branch line at $80 million, while a 2015 study placed the cost of rebuilding the line as far south as Salina at $110 million (equivalent to $149 million in 2025). The 2015 study listed restoring rail access to the region as one of three priorities for new freight rail lines in a study presented by the Utah Department of Transportation detailing the current state of Utah's rail infrastructure. It specifically noted an increase of coal hauling trucks on highways and streets in the area due to the loss of rail access.

==== Highways ====
The new alignment of US‑6/US‑89 was opened on December 30, 1983. The dedication was planned for the next day, but lines of cars formed at the barricades as soon as news broke that the highway was complete. Some were residents anxious to see the area or visit relatives they had not seen since the slide; others were truck drivers frustrated by long detours. The Highway Patrol requested the ceremony be canceled and the highway opened early, as they were unable to disperse the crowds.

When the first traffic flowed, crews had not finished some final tasks, such as striping the roadway. Motorists saw a relocation with several mountain cuts built high up the canyon wall, with a view of the slide and former lake. The roadbed was not expected to last, as weather conditions had been unfavorable when the asphalt was laid. Two mountain cuts were unstable, requiring several months of work before they could be left unattended. During this time, the state stationed two full-time watches at the cuts, who would close the road while falling rocks were cleared. The cut through Billies Mountain was described by the construction crews as a new, man-made mountain pass.

The pending completion of the again-rebuilt US‑6/US‑89, with properly laid asphalt and stable rock cuts, was announced in November 1984, 18 months after the closure of the original alignment. Starting in 1993, the Utah Department of Transportation began discussions with former Thistle residents to build a memorial to the town. The department maintains a view area overlooking the townsite along US‑6/US‑89.

=== Coal Hollow fire ===
On August 4, 2018, a lightning bolt sparked a large fire in Spanish Fork Canyon. More than 30,000 acres (47 sq mi; 120 km^{2}) of land were burned.

== Geology and climate ==
The landslide area near Thistle is a valley formed in a depression in an area of bedrock known as the Charleston–Nebo thrust plate. The rock in this plate dates from the Permian and Pennsylvanian to the Jurassic periods, but the plate appears to have formed elsewhere and moved to the modern Thistle area during the Late Cretaceous epoch. The layers of sedimentary rock above the thrust plate are younger, dating to the Cretaceous and Tertiary periods. The rock debris in the landslide itself comes from the North Horn and Ankareh formations.

The area around Thistle has always been prone to landslides. Pre-historic landslides created the more gentle slopes that made the area usable as a transportation corridor across the Wasatch Mountains. Minor landslides have been frequently observed, and continue to occur. The largest recorded landslides are the 1983 slide which destroyed the town, and a smaller one in 1998.

The climate at downstream Spanish Fork is classified as arid with four distinct seasons. Temperatures range from an average high of 92 °F (33 °C) in July and an average low of 20 °F (−7 °C) in January. Except for the spring months, precipitation averages less than 2 inches (5.1 cm) per month.

== See also ==
- List of ghost towns in Utah
- Other effects of the 1983 flooding
  - Utah Flood of 1983
  - Colorado River Floods of 1983
  - Great Salt Lake#West Desert Pumping Project – engineering effort to mitigate the flooding
- Other towns established by the railroad to service or aid trains over the grade of the Wasatch Plateau
  - Mill Fork, Utah
  - Tucker, Utah
  - Colton, Utah
  - Soldier Summit, Utah
  - Helper, Utah
