= Utah State Route 78 =

State highway in Utah, United States

State Route 78
- SR-78 highlighted in red

Route information
- Maintained by UDOT
- Length: 9.418 mi (15.157 km)
- Existed: 1977–present

Major junctions
- South end: I-15 at Mills Junction
- North end: SR-28 in Levan

Location
- Country: United States
- State: Utah

Highway system
- Utah State Highway System; Interstate; US; State; Minor; Scenic
← SR-77	→ SR-79

State Route 78 (SR-78) is a 9.418-mile-long (15.157 km) state highway in the U.S. state of Utah that serves as a connector from the town of Levan and SR-28 to Interstate 15 (I-15) and the Chicken Creek Reservoir. The route was formed in 1977 and has preserved its initial state since then.

== Route description ==
The road begins at a diamond interchange with I-15 at exit 207. From that point, the route heads northwest as a two-lane undivided highway, running almost parallel to I-15 in the west and Chicken Creek Reservoir in the east. Once the route passes the reservoir, it eventually turns north-northwesterly until reaching the intersection of a local road, where it turns east. The route enters Levan as 100 North and soon terminates at SR-28, the main street of Levan.

The east–west portion of SR-78 between Levan and Elevator Road is a part of the National Highway System.

== Photo Gallery ==
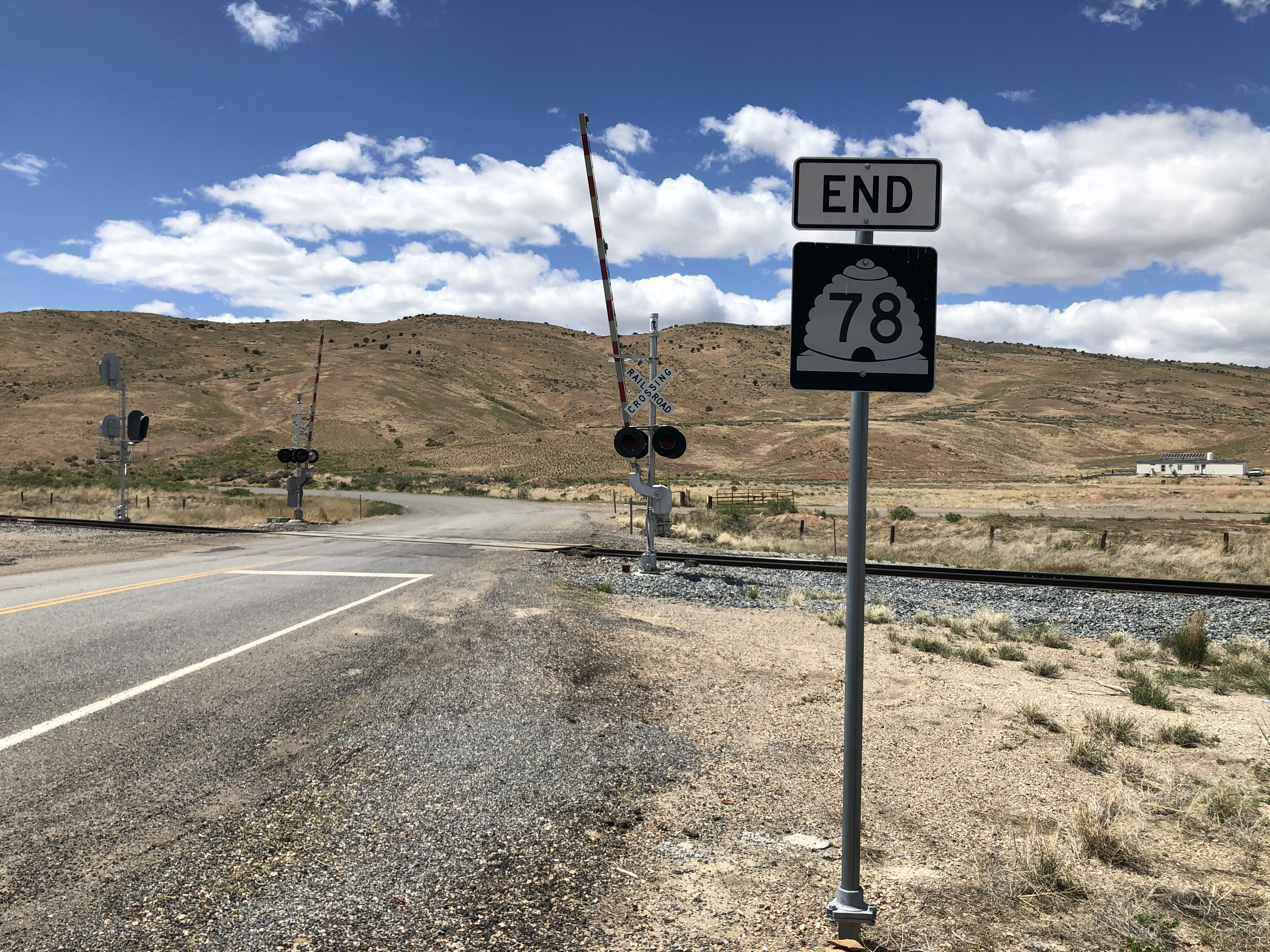
The western end of Utah 78, approximately 1/4 mile west of Interstate 15 at exit 202 (May 2020)

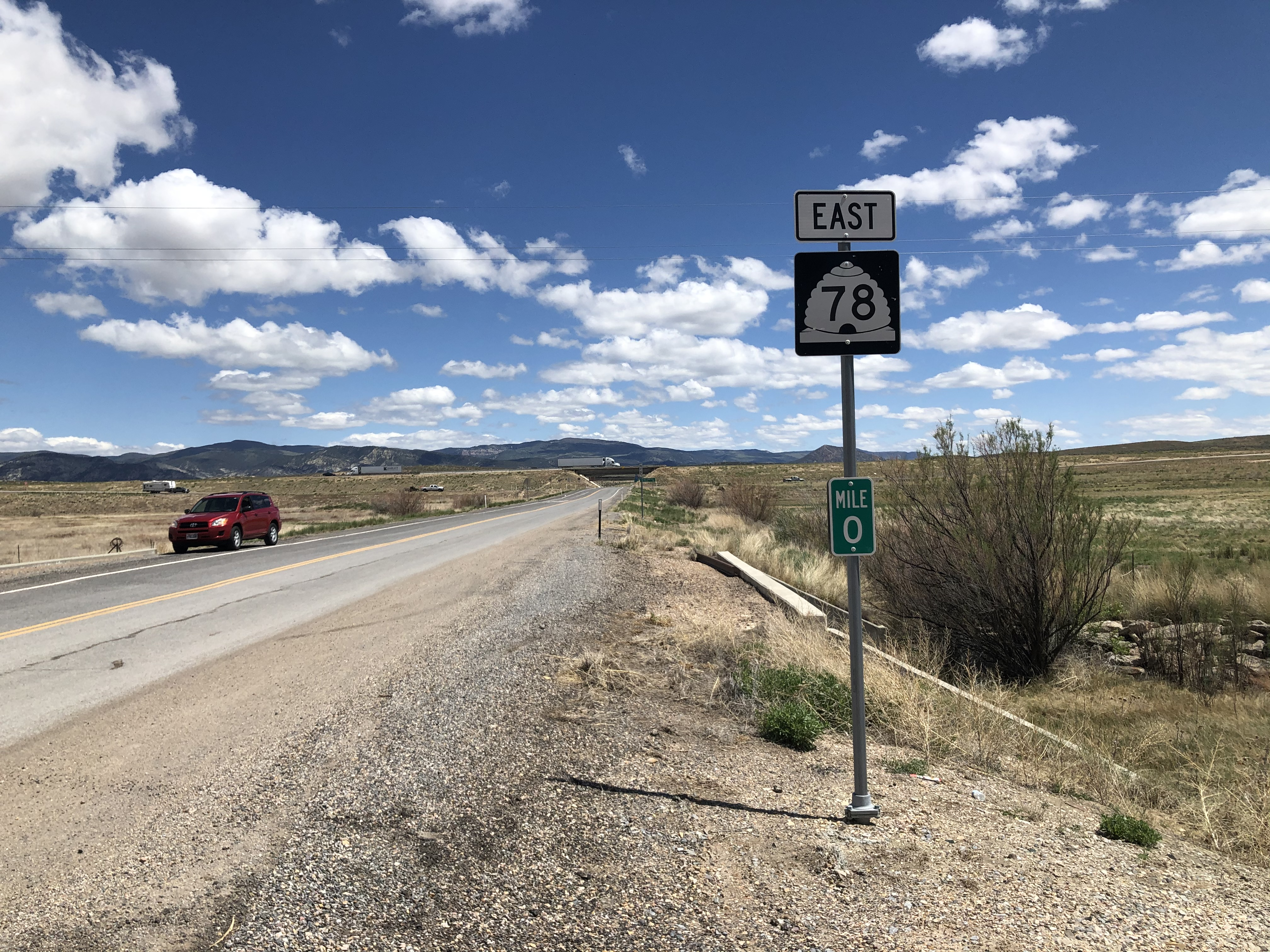
The western beginning of Utah route 78, at the Union Pacific tracks, approximately 1/4 mile west of I-15 (May 2020)

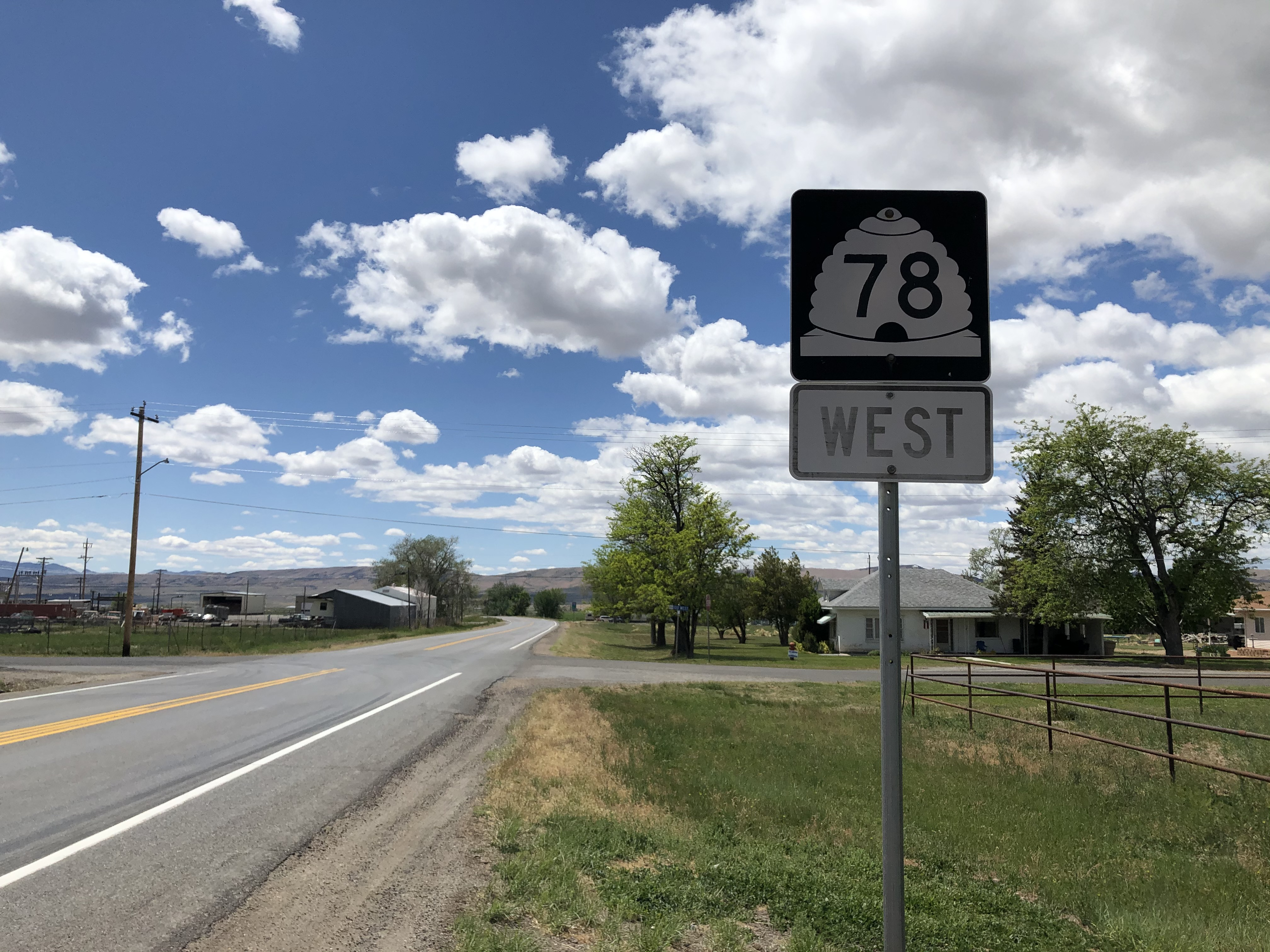
The eastern beginning of Utah route 78, at its junction with Utah route 28 in the town of Levan, Juab County (May 2020)

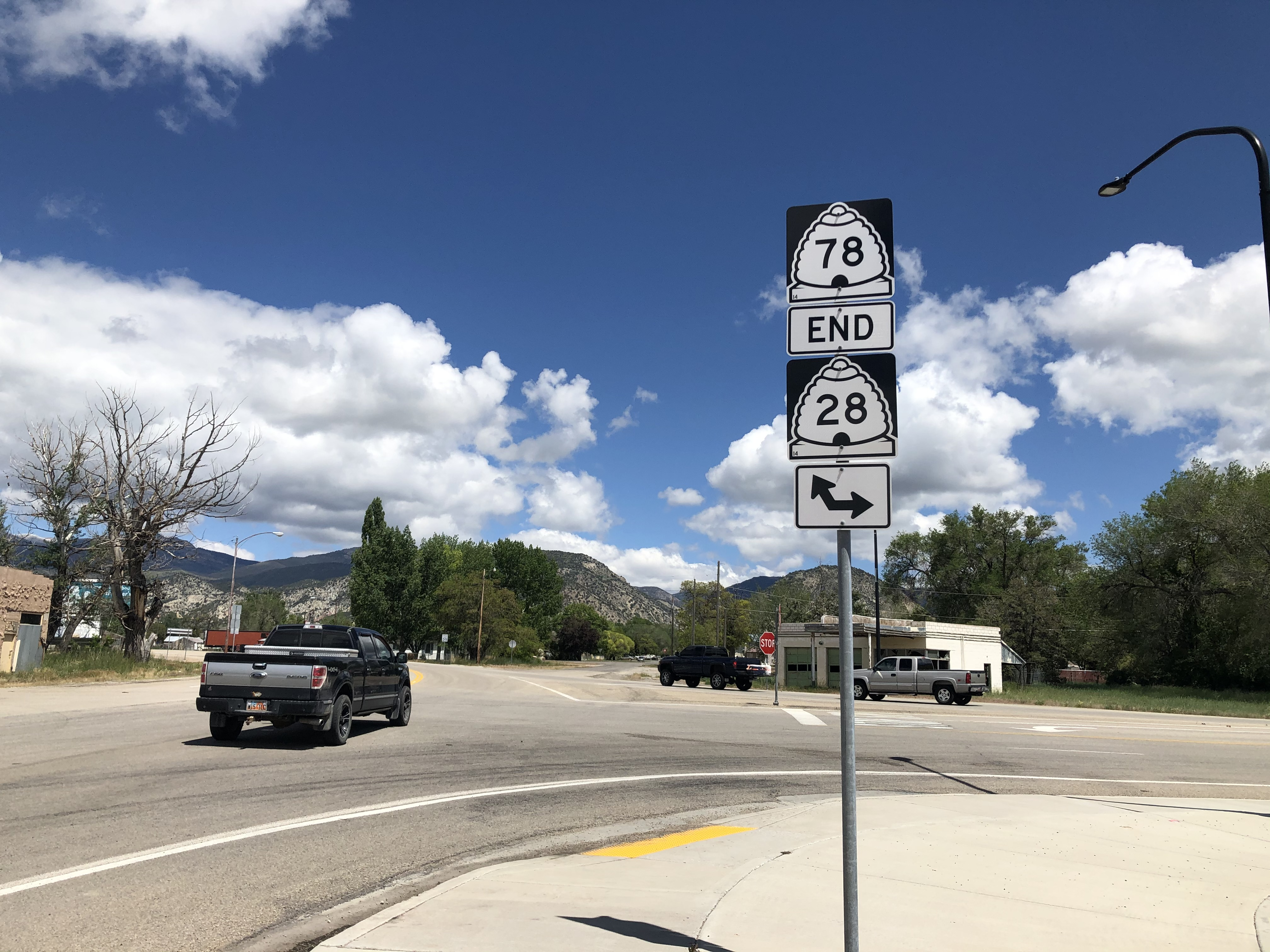
The eastern end of Utah route 78, at its junction with Utah route 28 in the town of Levan, Juab County (May 2020)

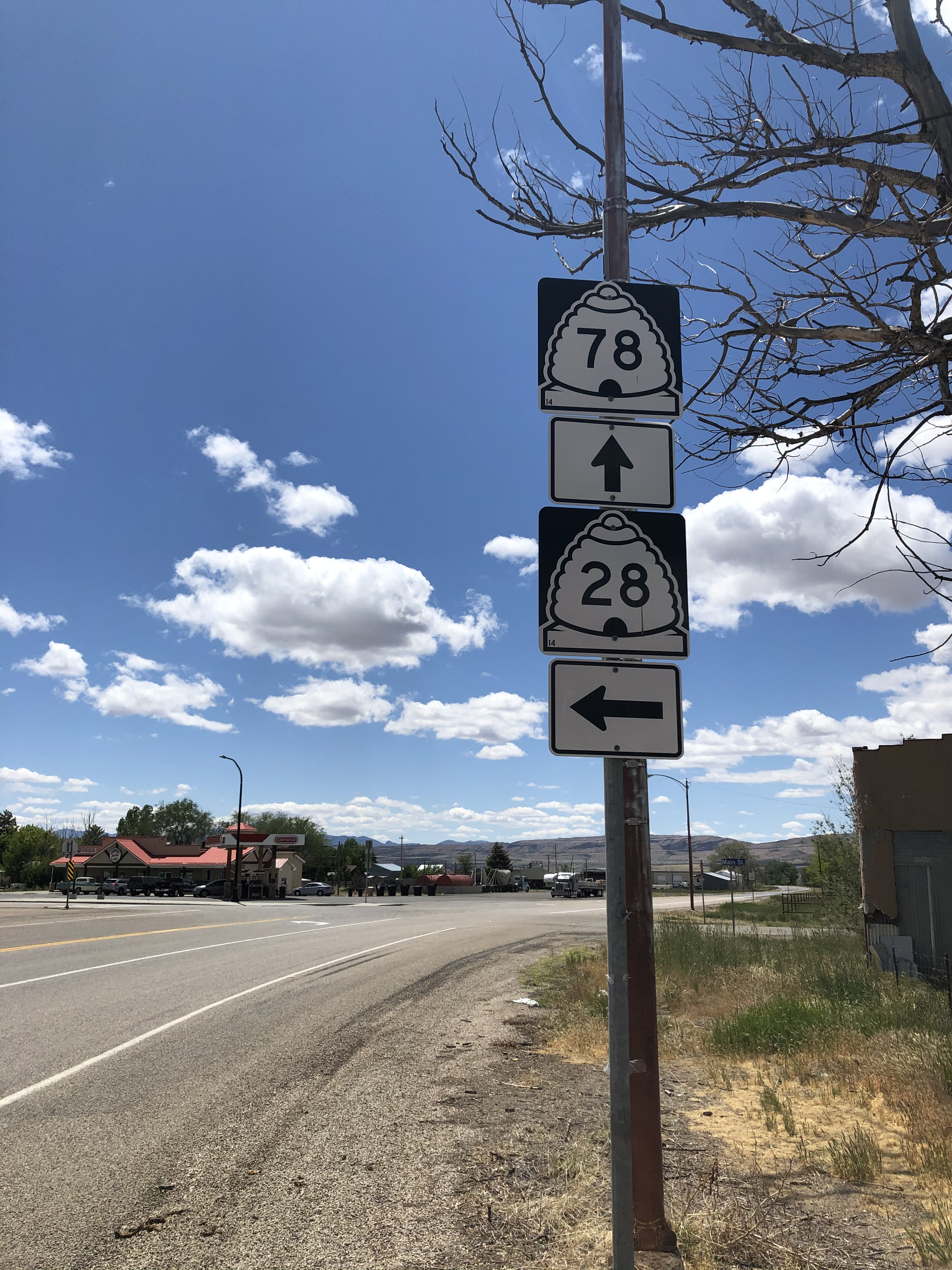
The eastern beginning of Utah route 78, at its junction with Utah route 28 in the town of Levan, Juab County (May 2020)

== History ==
In 1975, as Interstate 15 was being constructed in the area, State Route 163 was designated along the old alignment of US-91 from I-15 at Mills Junction to SR-28 in Levan. Since this route shared a number with U.S. Route 163 in southern Utah, it was renumbered to SR-78 in the 1977 Utah state route renumbering. The only change that has occurred to the route since then was a change to the legal definition in 1987, making it more detailed.

== Major intersections ==
The entire route is in Juab County.

Location	mi	km	Destinations	Notes
	0.000	0.000	Railroad crossing	Western terminus
Mills Junction	0.193– 0.304	0.311– 0.489	I-15 – Fillmore, Salt Lake City	Exit 207 on I-15; diamond interchange
Levan	9.418	15.157	SR-28 (Main Street)	Eastern terminus
1.000 mi = 1.609 km; 1.000 km = 0.621 mi
