= Levan, Utah =

Town in Juab County, Utah, United States

- Town
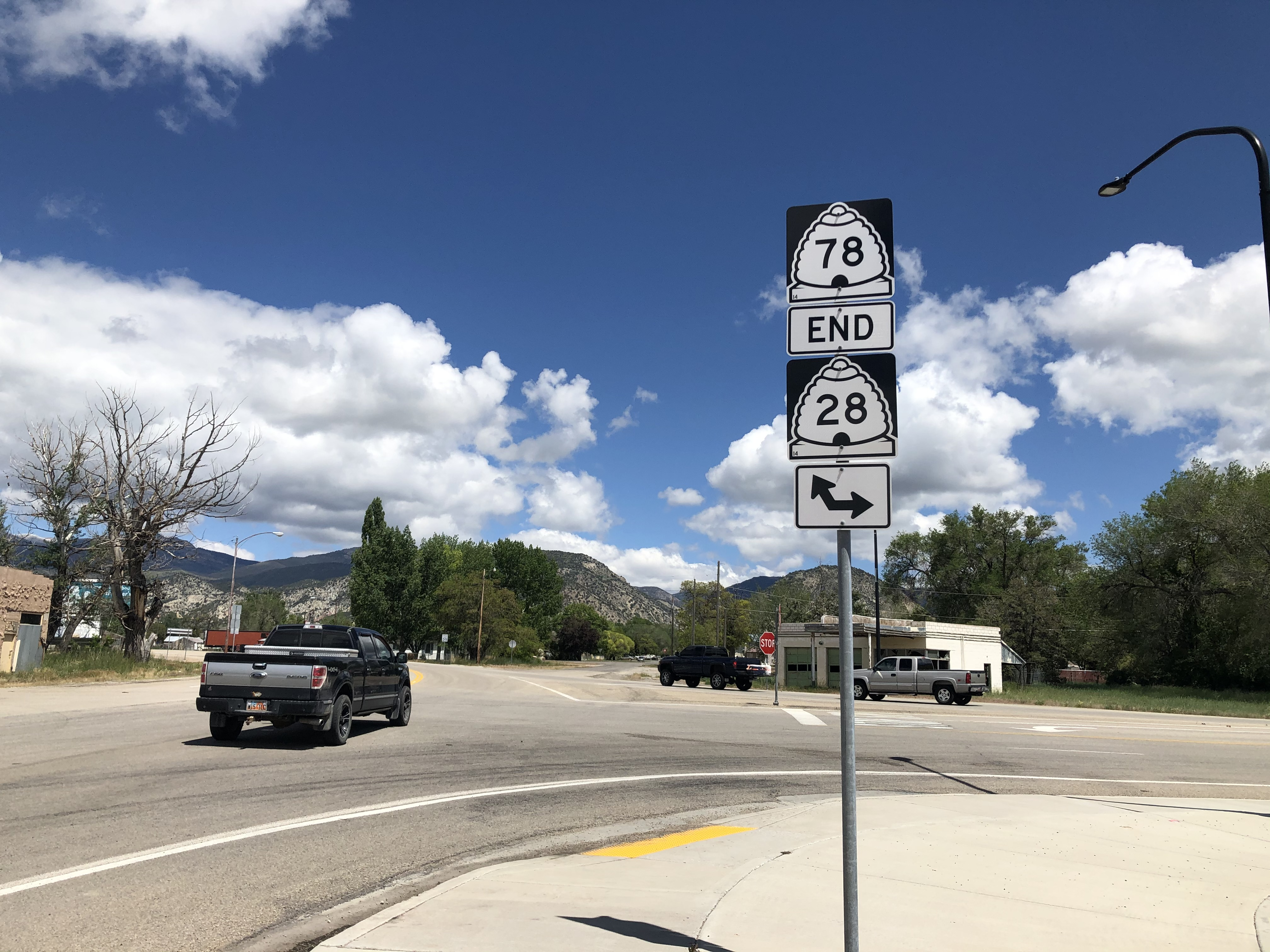
- Junction of SR-28 and SR-78 in Levan, May 2020

- Location in Juab County and the state of Utah
- Coordinates: 39°33′24″N 111°51′40″W
- Country: United States
- State: Utah
- County: Juab
- Founded: 1867

Area
  - Total: 0.81 sq mi (2.10 km^{2})
  - Land: 0.81 sq mi (2.10 km^{2})
  - Water: 0 sq mi (0.00 km^{2})
- Elevation: 5,315 ft (1,620 m)

Population (2020)
  - Total: 862
  - Density: 1,063.1/sq mi (410.47/km^{2})
- Time zone: UTC-7 (Mountain (MST))
  - Summer (DST): UTC-6 (MDT)
- ZIP code: 84639
- Area code: 435
- FIPS code: 49-44650
- GNIS feature ID: 1442564
- Website: levantown.org

Levan (/ləˈvæn/ lə-VAN) is a town in Juab County, Utah, United States. As of the 2020 census it had a population of 862.

It is often said that the name of the town derives from its location near the center of Utah, because the name is "navel" spelled backwards. Several other origins have been suggested for the name, from French, Latin, or Colorado River Numic language.

== Demographics ==
Historical population
Census	Pop.	Note	%±
1900	614		—
1910	752		22.5%
1920	634		−15.7%
1930	611		−3.6%
1940	621		1.6%
1950	521		−16.1%
1960	421		−19.2%
1970	376		−10.7%
1980	453		20.5%
1990	416		−8.2%
2000	688		65.4%
2010	841		22.2%
2020	862		2.5%
U.S. Decennial Census

As of the census of 2000, there were 688 people, 219 households, and 183 families residing in the town. The population density was 900.7 people per square mile (349.5/km^{2}). There were 258 housing units at an average density of 337.7 per square mile (131.1/km^{2}). The racial makeup of the town was 97.38% White, 0.15% African American, 0.15% Native American, 0.29% Pacific Islander, 0.15% from other races, and 1.89% from two or more races. 3.49% of the population were Hispanic or Latino of any race.

There were 219 households, out of which 49.8% had children under the age of 18 living with them, 69.4% were married couples living together, 10.5% had a female householder with no husband present, and 16.0% were non-families. 15.1% of all households were made up of individuals, and 6.8% had someone living alone who was 65 years of age or older. The average household size was 3.14 and the average family size was 3.49.

In the town, the population was spread out, with 37.2% under the age of 18, 8.4% from 18 to 24, 26.3% from 25 to 44, 17.3% from 45 to 64, and 10.8% who were 65 years of age or older. The median age was 28 years. For every 100 females, there were 103.6 males. For every 100 females age 18 and over, there were 96.4 males.

The median income for a household in the town was $34,632, and the median income for a family was $36,250. Males had a median income of $33,500 versus $18,750 for females. The per capita income for the town was $12,260. 6.1% of the population and 5.1% of families were below the poverty line. Out of the total population, 3.4% of those under the age of 18 and 8.8% of those 65 and older were living below the poverty line.

== Geography ==
Levan is in eastern Juab County, in the Juab Valley at the western base of the San Pitch Mountains. Utah State Route 28 passes through the town, leading north 10 miles (16 km) to Nephi, the county seat, and south 30 miles (48 km) to Gunnison. Utah State Route 78 leads southwest from Levan 11 miles (18 km) to Interstate 15 near Chicken Creek Reservoir.

According to the United States Census Bureau, Levan has a total area of 0.77 square miles (2.0 km^{2}), all land.

=== Climate ===
This climatic region is typified by large seasonal temperature differences, with hot summers and cold (sometimes severely cold) winters with lots of snow. According to the Köppen Climate Classification system, Levan has a humid continental climate, abbreviated "Dfa" on climate maps.

Climate data for Levan, Utah, 1991–2020 normals, extremes 1895–present
Month	Jan	Feb	Mar	Apr	May	Jun	Jul	Aug	Sep	Oct	Nov	Dec	Year
Record high °F (°C)	63 (17)	71 (22)	80 (27)	87 (31)	95 (35)	105 (41)	105 (41)	102 (39)	102 (39)	90 (32)	77 (25)	70 (21)	105 (41)
Mean maximum °F (°C)	52.2 (11.2)	58.1 (14.5)	70.8 (21.6)	78.0 (25.6)	86.3 (30.2)	94.1 (34.5)	98.4 (36.9)	95.7 (35.4)	91.4 (33.0)	81.4 (27.4)	68.3 (20.2)	55.3 (12.9)	98.9 (37.2)
Mean daily maximum °F (°C)	38.9 (3.8)	44.2 (6.8)	55.4 (13.0)	62.6 (17.0)	71.9 (22.2)	83.5 (28.6)	90.9 (32.7)	89.1 (31.7)	80.2 (26.8)	66.7 (19.3)	51.4 (10.8)	38.9 (3.8)	64.5 (18.1)
Daily mean °F (°C)	28.3 (−2.1)	33.1 (0.6)	42.3 (5.7)	48.2 (9.0)	56.9 (13.8)	67.1 (19.5)	74.7 (23.7)	73.0 (22.8)	64.1 (17.8)	51.7 (10.9)	38.8 (3.8)	28.3 (−2.1)	50.5 (10.3)
Mean daily minimum °F (°C)	17.6 (−8.0)	22.0 (−5.6)	29.1 (−1.6)	33.9 (1.1)	41.9 (5.5)	50.6 (10.3)	58.5 (14.7)	57.0 (13.9)	48.0 (8.9)	36.7 (2.6)	26.1 (−3.3)	17.7 (−7.9)	36.6 (2.6)
Mean minimum °F (°C)	−1.2 (−18.4)	4.0 (−15.6)	15.5 (−9.2)	21.5 (−5.8)	28.4 (−2.0)	37.0 (2.8)	47.8 (8.8)	46.5 (8.1)	34.0 (1.1)	21.5 (−5.8)	8.6 (−13.0)	−2.3 (−19.1)	−6.3 (−21.3)
Record low °F (°C)	−28 (−33)	−28 (−33)	−6 (−21)	3 (−16)	20 (−7)	26 (−3)	33 (1)	32 (0)	17 (−8)	4 (−16)	−11 (−24)	−26 (−32)	−28 (−33)
Average precipitation inches (mm)	1.26 (32)	1.29 (33)	1.54 (39)	1.61 (41)	1.53 (39)	0.70 (18)	0.68 (17)	0.57 (14)	0.99 (25)	1.41 (36)	1.14 (29)	1.41 (36)	14.13 (359)
Average snowfall inches (cm)	7.7 (20)	5.5 (14)	2.3 (5.8)	2.2 (5.6)	0.1 (0.25)	0.0 (0.0)	0.0 (0.0)	0.0 (0.0)	0.0 (0.0)	0.7 (1.8)	4.5 (11)	9.2 (23)	32.2 (82)
Average precipitation days (≥ 0.01 in)	7.8	8.5	8.7	8.9	7.4	3.9	4.7	5.8	4.9	6.6	6.4	8.5	82.1
Average snowy days (≥ 0.1 in)	3.4	2.3	1.5	0.9	0.1	0.0	0.0	0.0	0.0	0.3	1.5	3.5	13.5
Source: NOAA

== Education ==
It is in the Juab School District.

== See also ==
- List of municipalities in Utah
