= Mill Fork, Utah =

Mill Fork
- Ghost town
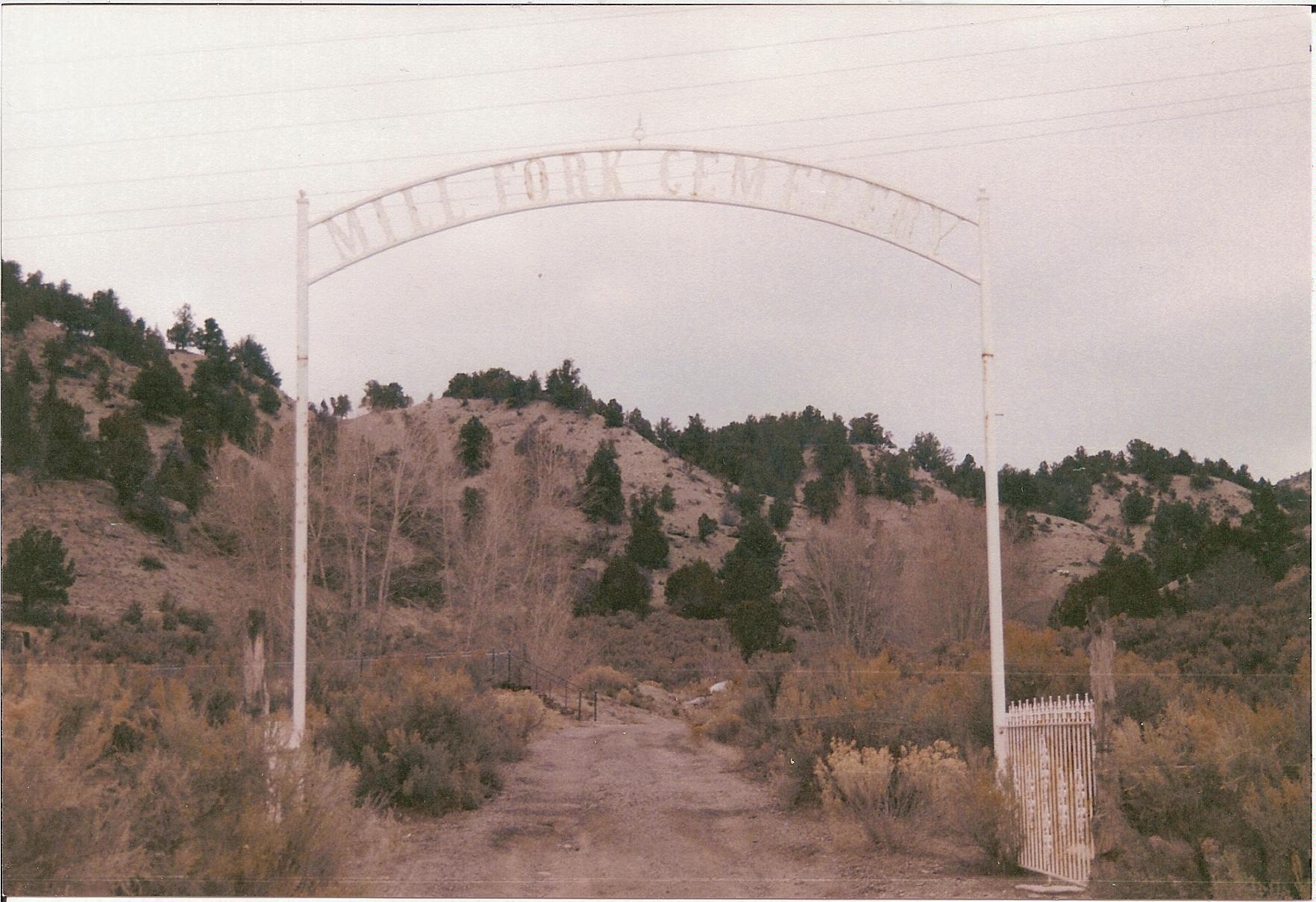
- The entrance to Mill Fork Cemetery

- Location within Utah Location within the United States
- Coordinates: 39°57′50″N 111°18′29″W
- Country: United States
- State: Utah
- County: Utah
- Established: c. 1877
- Abandoned: 1930s
- Elevation: 5,820 ft (1,774 m)
- GNIS feature ID: 1443443

Mill Fork is a ghost town located approximately 12 miles (19 km) east of Thistle in Spanish Fork Canyon in Utah County, Utah, United States. Named for its sawmills, Mill Fork was important in the development of the railroad through the canyon. The arched entrance to the small, well-tended Mill Fork Cemetery is a landmark on U.S. Route 6 between the cities of Spanish Fork and Price.

== History ==
The Utah and Pleasant Valley Railroad, a predecessor of the Denver and Rio Grande Western, was building through Spanish Fork Canyon in 1875–1879. Sometime during this period the railroad established three sawmills at Mill Fork to process railroad ties. A large water tower and a small reservoir were constructed in 1888, soon to be joined by a general store and housing for railroad employees. A helper engine was also stationed here. The population grew as high as 250.

Another use for the area's abundant timber came with the creation of an extensive charcoal business in the canyon; many Mill Fork residents were employed in cutting the wood or working the kilns. The charcoal business closed down around 1890, followed by the store, and Mill Fork was in a serious decline. Most residents had left by 1900; a few homesteaders lasted until the 1930s. The 1940s saw the change to diesel locomotives. No longer needed as a water stop, and with its helper engine obsolete, the Mill Fork railway station was closed down in 1947. The railroad removed its section house in the late 1950s, leaving little besides the cemetery.

== See also ==
- List of ghost towns in Utah
