= Risks to the Glen Canyon Dam =

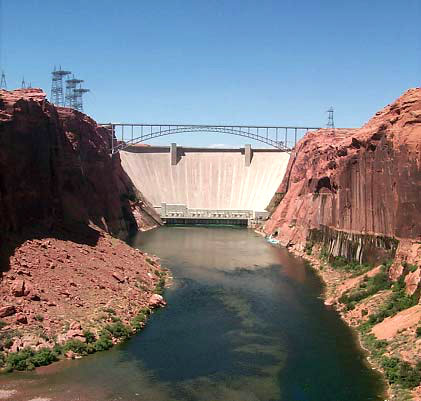
Glen Canyon Dam viewed from inside lower Glen Canyon

Glen Canyon Dam, a concrete arch dam on the Colorado River in the American state of Arizona, is viewed as carrying a large amount of risk, most notably due to siltation. The Colorado and San Juan rivers deposit large volumes of silt into Lake Powell, slowly decreasing its capacity. The sediment will eventually build up against the dam and could affect its safe operation and lead to its failure.

The dam, anchored in unstable Navajo sandstone (sometimes said to be "solidified sand dunes"), nearly failed in 1983 as the result of a flood on the upper Colorado River that led to extended use of its tunnel spillways. The spillways, designed for short-term use, soon underwent cavitation and began to fail. Emergency installation of 8-foot (2.4 m) flashboards and other efforts narrowly averted total failure.

Siltation, concrete degradation, spillway operational problems, and unstable dam abutments are all key factors that affect the safe operation of the dam. It is estimated that a breach of the dam would produce a floodwave that would overtop the Hoover Dam. The dam's useful lifespan has been estimated by some to be 85 to 100 years, and was described as "America's most regretted environmental mistake" by David Brower, then-head of the Sierra Club. Different estimates by the Bureau of Reclamation and others suggest a lifespan of between 500–700 years.

== Overview ==
Glen Canyon Dam is a concrete arch dam on the Colorado River in northern Arizona in the United States, just north of Page. The dam was built to provide hydroelectricity and regulate the flow of the river from the upper Colorado River Basin into the lower. The Lake Powell reservoir is the second largest artificial lake in the country, extending upriver well into Utah. The dam is named for Glen Canyon, a colorful series of gorges, most of which now are buried under the reservoir.

Construction of Glen Canyon Dam began in 1956 and was finished in 1966. When the reservoir filled, the dam began to deliver a steady, regulated flow of water downstream and generate a cheap, plentiful supply of electricity. In 1983, major floods nearly destroyed the two tunnel spillways that could have led to the dam's collapse, but disaster was averted by a close margin. By taming floods that were characteristic of the Colorado River, the dam has led to major physical and ecological changes in the lower river. Controversy continues over the positive and negative effects of the dam.

== Siltation ==
The Colorado River carries an estimated 45 million tons of sediment annually at Glen Canyon, and as Lake Powell is the farthest large reservoir upstream on the Colorado River mainstem, the sediment load is completely trapped in the reservoir as the Colorado discharges into it. This sediment is creating a steadily advancing "toe" of sediment, i.e. an underwater alluvial fan, that is advancing towards the dam. Some estimates by conservationists predict that the sediment will reach the dam base in about 80 to 100 years, while others made primarily by government agencies estimate it will take as long as 500 to 700 years. It will take still longer for the sediment to accumulate to the point where it could clog the outlet works, which are the lowest openings in the upstream face of the dam.

Some critics predict that if the water level then drops, it may fall below the penstock openings, which are higher up on the dam face, which will cause the release capacity of the dam to drop to zero. This would dewater the Colorado River bed below the dam which would remain dry until the next major spring inflow. Only springs, seeps and tributaries such as the Paria, Little Colorado and Virgin River would supply the river flow during these times, perhaps causing unprecedented drops in levels of Lake Mead as well.

The primary failure mode for Glen Canyon dam will likely be an overtopping one spring caused by insufficient storage capacity (either a huge inflow, bigger than 1983, or insufficient storage capacity because the lake was too full of either water or sediment).

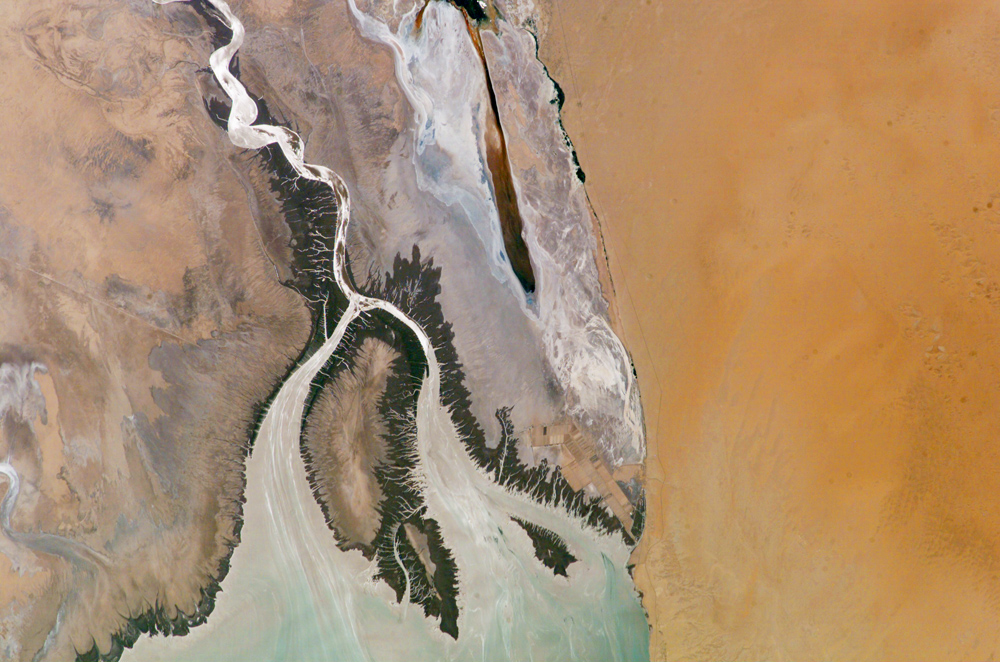
Colorado River Delta today, showing inflows mostly from the Hardy River and other Mexican tributaries

An example of the fast deposition rate of Colorado River sediment is found in Lake Mead itself, where, before the completion of Glen Canyon Dam, ten percent of its storage was already compromised by sediment. When Lake Powell levels drop, sediments deposited in its upper reaches are carried into the receding water by the Colorado and its tributaries. One large flash flood caused by heavy rainfall could move all or most of these sediments into Lake Powell, creating a sudden loss of storage capacity. One way to control sediment flow in the reservoir, without removing the dam outright, is by dredging.

== Downstream sediment transport ==
The construction of Glen Canyon Dam was significantly changed by the natural sediment transport along the Colorado river by trapping large amounts of sand and silt in Lake Powell. This trapping of sediments altered downstream geomorphic processes that previously maintained depositional features along the river corridor. Which caused a reduction in the amount of available sand that would be used to rebuild depositional features in the Grand Canyon corridor. Before the dam regulations, seasonal flooding would transport large amounts of sediments downstream, which helped maintain sandbars that supported riparian vegetation, archaeological site protection, and aquatic habitat complexity through regular sediment redistribution during natural flood cycles. Following the dam closure, the reduction of sediment supply led to a widespread sandbar erosion and long-term geomorphic adjustments of the river channel that changed how sediment is stored and redistributed downstream.

Since natural sediment transport processes were disrupted, controlled high-flow releases were implemented as an adaptive measurement strategy to rebuild sandbars using tributary-supplied sediment as part of experimental restoration flow programs designed to partially mimic historical flood conditions. These experimental floods can increase the sandbar volume temporarily, but model studies show that the sandbars erode between flood events because sediments remain limited under dam operations. Because Glen Canyon Dam traps most upstream sediments in Lake Powell, the sand that's available for rebuilding the sandbars downstream now comes from tributaries which are smaller rivers that flow into the main Colorado River. A major remaining source is the Paria River, which delivers bursts of sand during seasonal runoff events that temporarily increase sediment availability within the Grand Canyon corridor. The long-term effectiveness of restoration flows depend on the frequency of the controlled releases and the availability of sand delivered from the tributaries, like the Paria River, which provides a small fraction of the river's historical sediment supply. If controlled floods happen when little tributary sediments are available, the sandbars that were rebuilt during the restoration releases will erode quickly after, reducing the long-term stability of restoration-created depositional features. Which limits their ability to support the ecological, cultural, and recreational functions they were historically able to provide along the river corridor. The reduction of sediment availability also constrains broader ecological restoration efforts downstream of the dam by altering channel morphology and riparian vegetation patterns that support native species habitat and influence how restoration strategies are implemented across the river landscape.

Researchers have emphasized that restoration outcomes depend on balancing hydropower operations with ecological objectives, which limits the ability of management strategies to fully restore pre-dam geomorphic conditions. As a result, restoration success depends on not only the sediment supply but also on flow regulation, and ecosystem-based management strategies increasingly rely on coordinated reservoir operations together with tributary sediment inputs to maintain sandbar habitat within the Grand Canyon corridor as part of ongoing adaptive management approaches used to support downstream restoration goals.

== 1983–84 flooding ==
In May 1983, three years after Lake Powell was first filled, an unusually long-lasting winter due to the 1982–83 El Niño event produced increased snowfall over the entire 108,335-square-mile (280,590 km^{2}) multi-state Colorado River basin. Dam engineers anticipated a normal winter, and maintained reservoir levels at their usual levels through the winter.

=== Inflow capacity ===
Spring ended with a sudden influx of warm weather and then rain. The combination of rain and snowmelt eventually produced a combined inflow into Lake Powell of over 111,500 cubic feet (3,160 m^{3}) per second.

The average annual peak flow prior to 1963 was 93,400 cubic feet (2,640 m^{3}) per second. The Bureau of Reclamation states that the highest inflow the Glen Canyon Dam can withstand is 697,000 cubic feet (19,700 m^{3}) per second, almost seven times the 1983 total.

=== Outflow capacity ===
Glen Canyon Dam has two tunnel spillways capable of allowing 276,000 cu ft/s (7,815 m^{3}/s) to bypass the dam's regular spillways. The spillway tunnels were excavated around both abutments of the dam, dropping steeply from their control gates on Lake Powell to connect with the lower reaches of the diversion tunnels, which were utilized as the lower ends of the dam's spillways. This measure saved cost, but introduced a weak point at the elbow where the two tunnels intersected. The upper ends of the diversion tunnels were then sealed with a solid concrete "plug".

While this made the spillways more economical to construct, they had less capacity in part because engineers must maintain at least 30 percent clearance between the water level and the tunnel ceiling. in addition to the tunnel spillways, the dam has a set of river outlet works designed to release 15,000 cubic feet (420 m^{3}) per second. The dam also releases water through the dam's power turbines, which are capable of releasing 31,500 cubic feet (890 m^{3}) per second. The official spillway capacity is 208,000 cu ft/s (5,900 m^{3}/s).

=== Tunnel spillways damaged ===
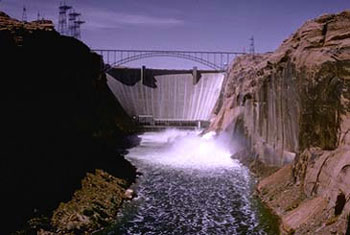
The releases from Glen Canyon Dam in May 1983

At first, as inflows exceeded normal levels, the US Bureau of Reclamation engineers opened penstocks to full release. When inflow rates continued to rise, they also opened the river outlet works. The reservoir continued to rise.

Reclamation Bureau officials met in late June and agreed that the maximum water level the dam could handle was 3,708 feet (1,130 m). At that level they feared they could not control the spillway gates. The engineers decided to raise the floodgates controlling the tunnel spillways. This became the first time that the spillways had ever been used for their intended purpose. Volume initially ran at 20,000 cubic feet (570 m^{3}) per second per tunnel. After several days, noticeable vibrations were felt in the dam wall and surrounding rock. Water exiting the spillways contained noticeable debris, including sandstone, signaling severe erosion taking place within the tunnels.

Reclamation responded by reducing releases by half, however, the rumblings continued. The noise was so noticeable that a worker in the employee dining room, located near the power plant, reported that it "sounded like the barrages that he had experienced in Vietnam". The engineers soon closed the spillways for an inspection.

=== Cavitation damage found ===
Inspection crews were lowered down the spillway tunnels in a small cart to assess damage. They found that cavitation, a known risk associated with tunnel spillways, had severely damaged and eroded the 3-foot-thick (0.91 m) concrete tunnel lining. In some locations the cavitation had exposed the soft sandstone.

The tunnels could not be kept closed as more rain fell in the Colorado River Basin and the reservoir continued to rise. Reclamation reopened the left spillway, allowing 12,000 cubic feet (340 m^{3}) per second; the right, which had suffered worse damage, was only permitted to carry 4,000 cubic feet (110 m^{3}) per second.

=== Emergency flashboards installed ===
As the reservoir level increased, plywood flashboards were installed on top of the spillway gates. They allowed reservoir water to rise 4 feet (1.2 m) without increasing releases.

=== Tunnels damaged further ===
The left tunnel, however, was suffering further damage, described as a "surging, boiling flow that filled the portal". The tunnel had formed a hydraulic jump as it was turned into a "pressure conduit" by the surging flow of water. The interior erosion threatened to collapse the tunnel. Engineers knew that increasing the flow would decrease the turbulence but would further damage to the tunnel walls. To increase the reservoir's capacity further, engineers began an emergency effort to add 8 feet (2.4 m) to the height of the spillway gates, avoiding increasing the rate of water releases.

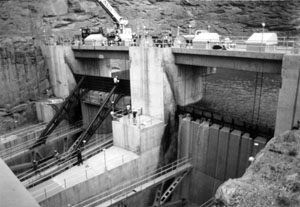
Spillway gates at Glen Canyon Dam during 1983 flood. Note the flashboards installed atop to prevent water from overtopping the gates.

=== Diversion tunnel threatened ===
The force of the water at the left tunnel eroded concrete near the diversion plug, a device that blocked the diversion tunnel used during construction. The Bureau of Reclamation was concerned that the water would eventually erode the diversion plug altogether, creating a connection to the reservoir floor. This uncontrolled spillage would cause the reservoir to drain, creating a catastrophe.

As the discharges from Glen Canyon Dam reached almost 90,000 cubic feet (2,500 m^{3}) per second, with 32,000 cubic feet (910 m^{3}) per second racing through the left spillway, the 9,500,000 acre-feet (11.7 km^{3}) of flood storage space behind Hoover Dam downstream was exhausted.

=== Lake Powell reaches peak level ===
On July 15, 1983, Lake Powell reached its peak level, 3,708.34 feet (1,130.30 m) about 8 inches (200 mm) from where engineers thought they'd lose control. The water held steady for a few days and then gradually declined. Inflows to Lake Powell topped 120,000 cubic feet (3,400 m^{3}) per second, while releases from Glen Canyon Dam topped 92,000 cubic feet (2,600 m^{3}) per second. Eventually, Hoover Dam was also forced to open its gates; its discharge peaked at 40,000 cubic feet (1,100 m^{3}) per second and still caused downstream flooding. As inflow lessened at the end of the season, dam engineers were able to draw Lake Powell down below critical levels.

=== Tunnel spillways seriously damaged ===
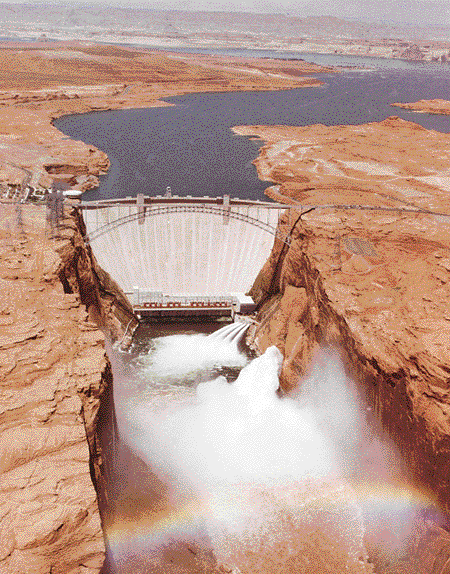
Glen Canyon Dam during the 1984 flood

Inspections of both spillways found severe damage. In the more badly damaged left spillway, inspection crews discovered a 32 feet (9.8 m) deep, 40 feet (12 m) wide, and 150 feet (46 m) long hole.

=== Repairs and solutions ===
After the flood, it was suggested that the flashboards atop the spillway gates should be replaced with stronger boards and kept permanently; this would allow an "insurance" against a 1983-reminiscent flood.

=== Air slots added to tunnels ===
Research by the Bureau of Reclamation found that an air slot at a specific point in each spillway tunnel would introduce air bubbles that would prevent cavitation and resultant shockwaves. Spillway upgrades and repairs commenced immediately after the 1983 floods receded and continued through the winter of 1983–84. Through the winter, heavy snowpack was reported in the upper Colorado basin. It was feared that this would produce a flood greater than the 1983 one, and as the spillway repairs continued, water was constantly released through the dam power plant and outlet works, a rate of roughly 45,000 cubic feet (1,300 m^{3}) per second.

=== 1984 floods possible ===
The engineers allowed Lake Powell's level to fall to allow for the next winter's snowmelt. When the snowpack began to melt in spring of 1984, water levels reached several inches below the top of the flashboards in late June. As summer continued, inflows decreased and the reservoir level began to decrease.

On August 12, 1984, construction teams completed repairs to the left spillway. It was tested at 50,000 cubic feet (1,400 m^{3}) per second for several days. No noticeable damage was found in the spillways.

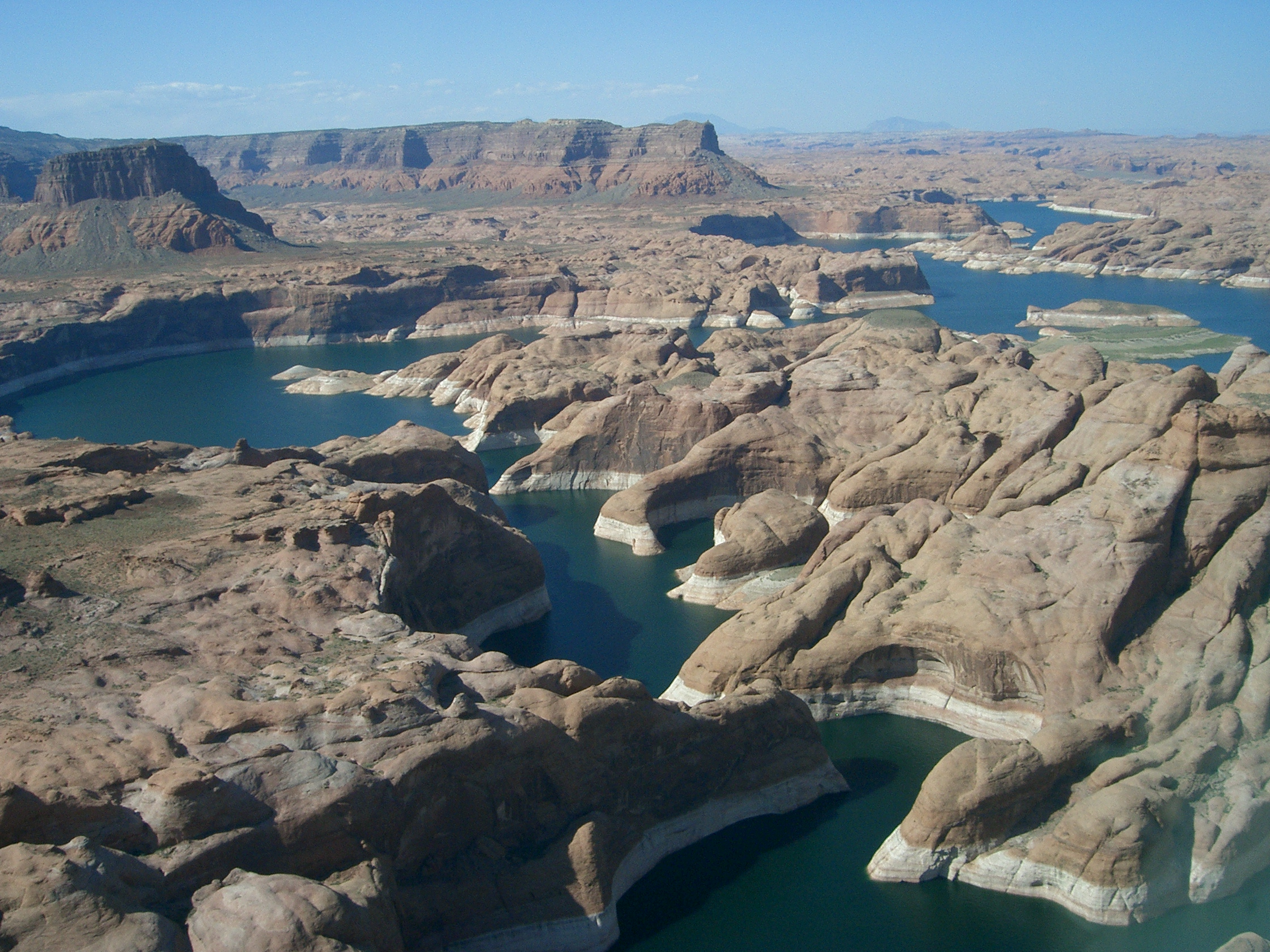
Lake Powell with "bathtub ring"

=== Aftermath ===
The 1983 flood, although it nearly caused a catastrophic disaster, was a "relatively small flood". It was, in fact, only a 25-year flood, or a flood that has a four percent chance of occurring in any given year.

=== Impact of dam failure ===
In 1990, the Bureau of Reclamation prepared a study of a Glen Canyon Dam failure. They predicted that if Lake Powell were at high pool, about 27,000,000 acre-feet (33 km^{3}) of water would surge out of Lake Powell at an initial depth of over 500 feet (150 m). Downstream communities and possibly every dam along the river, including Hoover Dam forming Lake Mead, Davis Dam forming Lake Mohave, Parker Dam forming Lake Havasu, Palo Verde Dam, and other dams and reservoirs, as well as riverside lowlands, would be inundated or severely damaged. The resulting flood would scour the bottom few hundred feet of the Grand Canyon.

Glen Canyon Dam is the central element of the Colorado River Storage Project. If it failed, the resulting damage could limit or completely cut off water supply to residences or farmlands along the Colorado River, and depending on damage to canal headworks, even cut off water to southern California.

== Restoration efforts ==
Following the construction of Glen Canyon Dam, the decrease in downstream sediment supply and the altered flow conditions led to long-term effects in the sandbars formation, riparian habitat, and native fish populations along the Colorado River through the Grand Canyon corridor. These changes led resource managers to develop adaptive management strategies to improve ecological conditions downstream while continuing to meet hydropower and water storage objectives. Which include controlled high-flow releases designed to redistribute sediments from tributaries and rebuild sandbars that provide habitats for native species.

Restoration strategies have included adjustments to the dam release flow, which will help improve habitat conditions for the native fish. For example, the Humpback Chub, a native fish whose population has declined due to the regulations for the river. Flow experiments and trout management flows are being used to regulate the habitats suitability downstream as an ongoing effort to support native species recovery while maintaining recreational fisheries in Glen Canyon.

Even though controlling flood and flow adjustments have increased the a sandbars size temporarily and have improved some habitat conditions, research shows that restoration outcomes continue to remain limited due to the continuous sediment trapping in Lake Powell. As a result, restoration efforts rely on coordinated reservoir operations together with sediment inputs from tributaries such as Paria River as a part of the ongoing adaptive management approaches intended to support downstream ecosystem recovery.
