= Utah State Route 28 =

State highway in Utah, United States

State Route 28

Route information
- Maintained by UDOT
- Length: 43.612 mi (70.187 km)
- Existed: 1925 as a state highway; 1927 as SR-28–present

Major junctions
- South end: US 89 in Gunnison
- SR-78 in Levan; I-15 in Nephi; SR-132 in Nephi
- North end: I-15 in Nephi

Location
- Country: United States
- State: Utah

Highway system
- Utah State Highway System; Interstate; US; State; Minor; Scenic
← SR-26	→ SR-29
← SR-39	41	→ SR-42

State Route 28 (SR-28) is a state highway in central Utah running for 43.612 miles (70.187 km) in Sanpete and Juab counties from Gunnison to Nephi. It serves as a connection from the Wasatch Front to the Sevier Valley.

== Route description ==
SR-28 begins at an intersection with US-89 in central Gunnison and heads north and northwest to Fayette. It continues northwest past the Sevier Bridge Reservoir and northeast past the Skinner Peaks and Horse Heaven Mountain to Levan.

SR-28 then continues north through Levan to Nephi, where it intersects I-15 at the south end of town and continues north along the I-15 Business Loop through Nephi, ending at an intersection with I-15 north of town.

The portion of SR-28 between US-89 and the I-15 interchange south of Nephi (Exit 222) is part of the National Highway System.

== History ==
The Utah State Legislature added the road from US-89 in Gunnison north to US-91 (now SR-78) in Levan to the state highway system in 1925 and numbered it SR-28 in 1927. For the next 40 years, SR-28 served as a connector between Utah's two major north-south US highways.

However, perhaps in preparation for the eventual replacement of US-91, which was being quickly superseded by the new Interstate 15, in 1968, the legislature redesignated several portions of US-91 with new numbers: SR-163 (renumbered SR-78 in the 1977 renumbering) from the point where US 91 diverged from I-15 at a proposed interchange west of Levan eastward to that town, an extension of SR-28 from Levan northward along old US 91 to a proposed interchange with I-15 two miles (3.2 km) south of Sheep Lane, and State Route 41 from another interchange one-half mile (0.8 km) south of Sheep Lane through Nephi to the north end of the bypass. These changes left a section of old US 91 between the two interchanges approximately 1.5 miles (2.4 km) in length which would become a local road.

The portion of I-15 west of Levan and south of Levan was one of the last two sections of the freeway to be completed in Utah. Well into the mid 1980s, traffic between Mills Junction and the south Nephi interchange was routed on old US 91, along the routes today designated as SR-78 and SR-28 with the route being marked on maps as Temporary 15.

When I-15 was finally built around Levan and Nephi in the 1980s, it was built further to the west than originally planned and without any intermediate interchanges. The freeway crossed old US-91 between the two communities. Because only one interchange was constructed south of Nephi instead of the two which were originally envisioned, the two different highways which were supposed to have endpoints at the two interchanges, both had endpoints at the same interchange. This meant that the north end of SR-28 and south end of SR-41 were in the same place. This was changed in 2006, when SR-28 was extended north to absorb all of SR-41.

== Major intersections ==
County	Location	mi	km	Destinations	Notes
Sanpete	Gunnison	0.000	0.000	US 89 – Salina, Mount Pleasant	Southern terminus; road continues as US-89 south (Main Street)
Juab	Levan	29.976	48.242	SR-78 south to I-15	Northern terminus of SR-78
Juab	Nephi	38.708– 38.874	62.294– 62.562	I-15 BL begin / I-15 – Fillmore, Provo	South end of I-15 Bus. overlap; exit 222 on I-15
Juab	Nephi	40.766	65.607	SR-132 (100 North)	
Juab		43.414– 43.558	69.868– 70.100	I-15 BL end / I-15 – Fillmore, Provo	Northern terminus; north end of I-15 Bus. overlap; exit 228 on I-15
1.000 mi = 1.609 km; 1.000 km = 0.621 mi: Concurrency terminus

== Photo Gallery ==
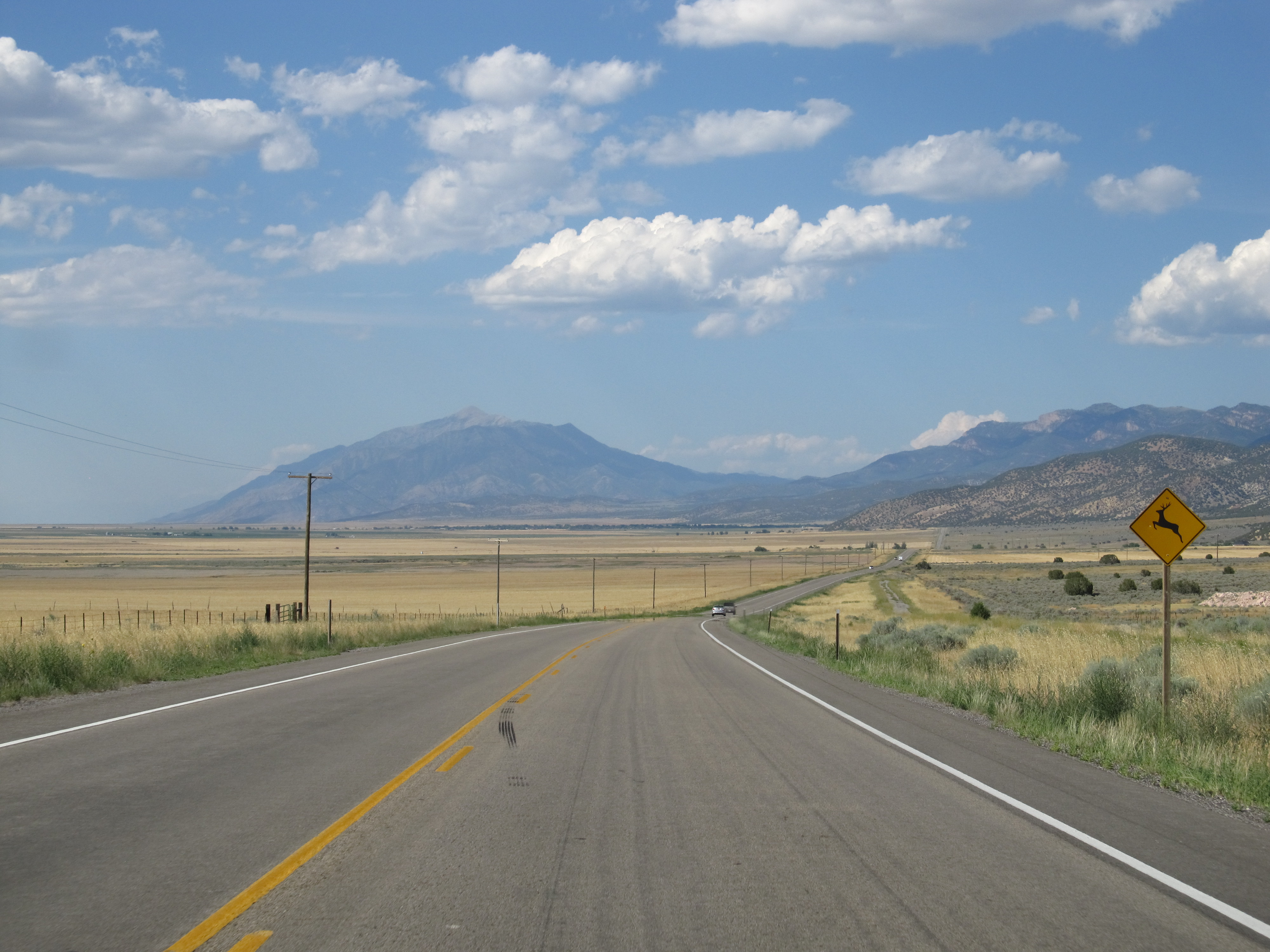
SR-28 between Fayette and Levan

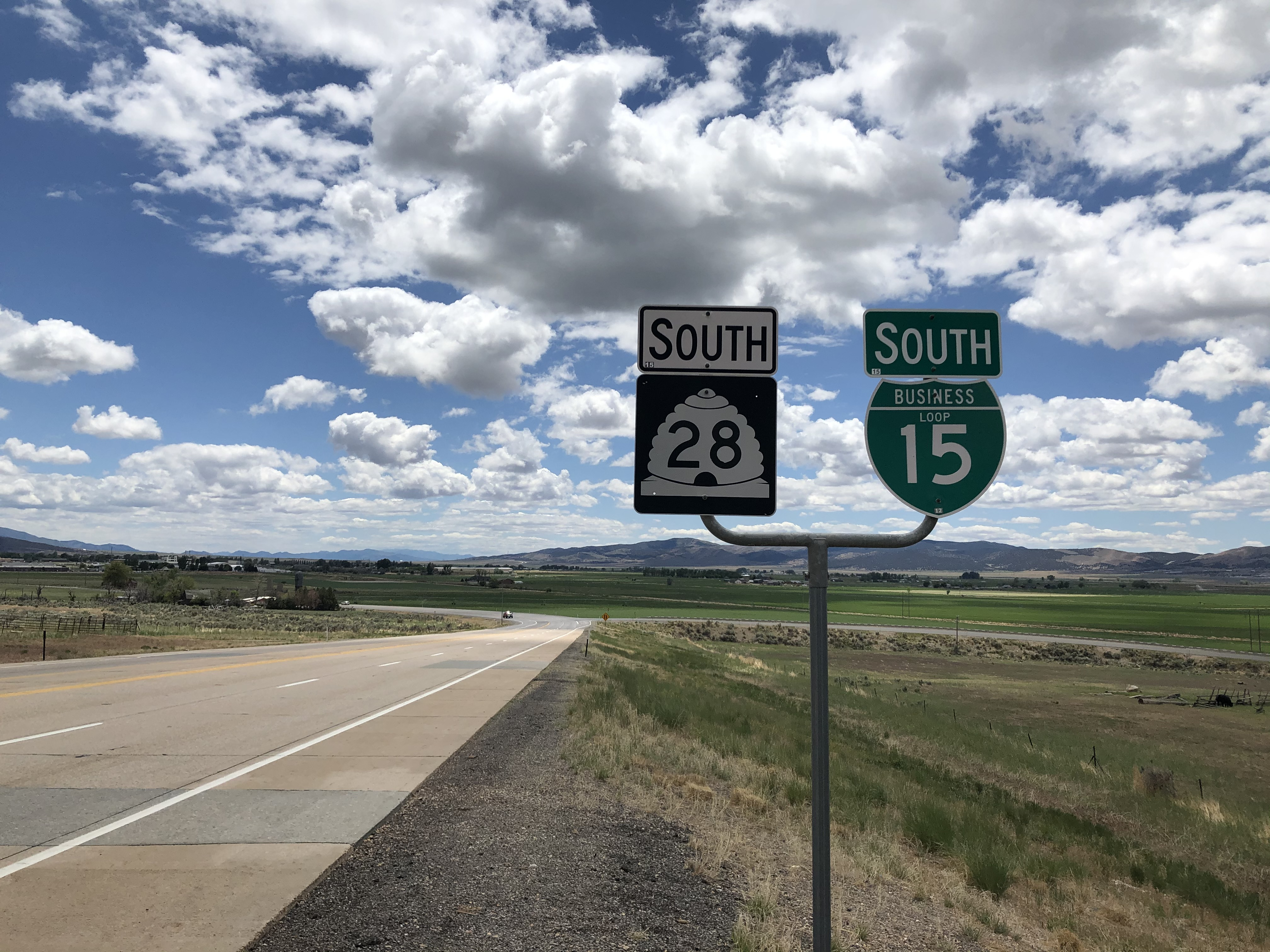
First trailblazer southbound from the northern beginning of the Route, just south of I-15, exit 228 (May 2020)

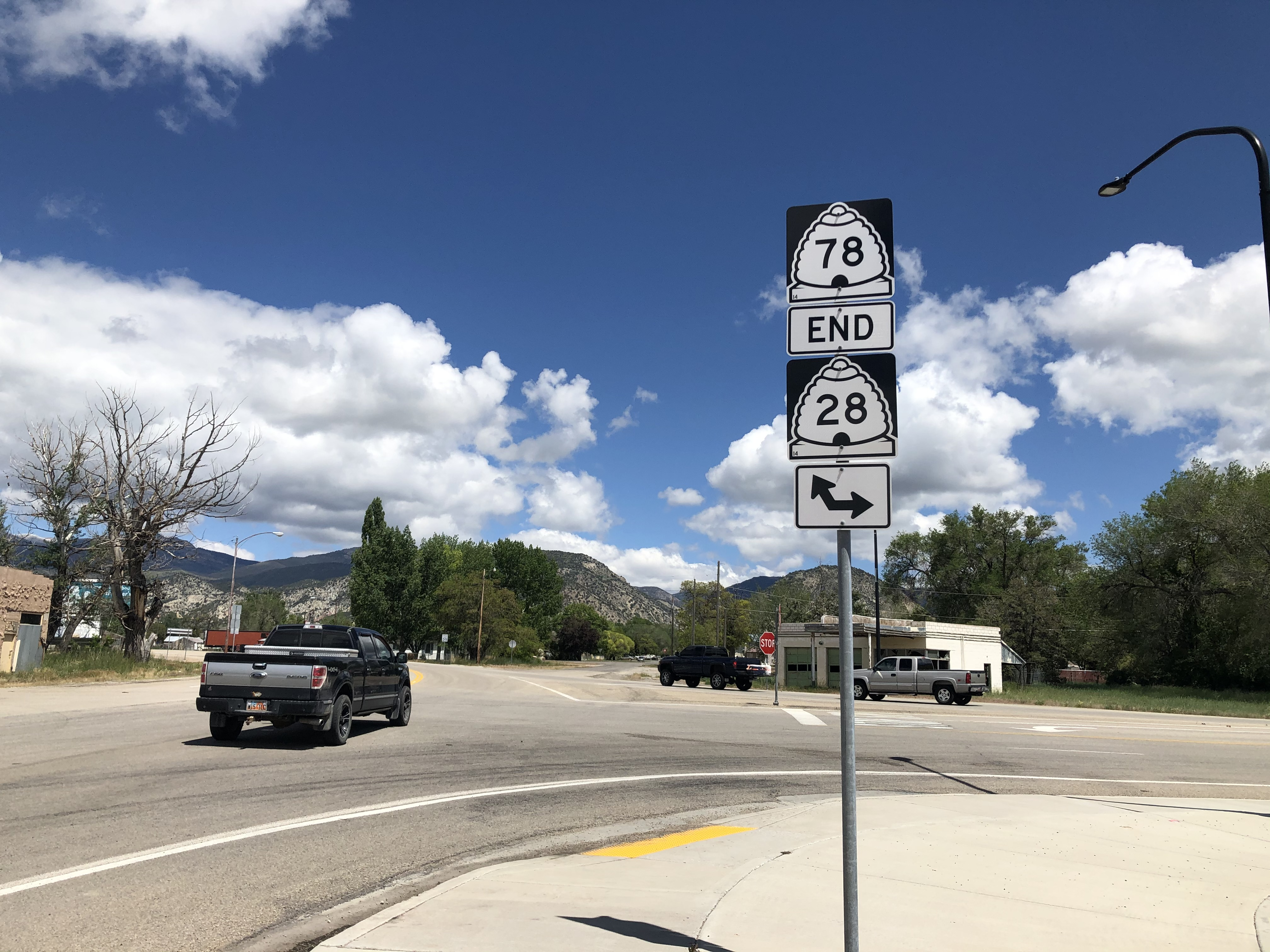
The eastern end of Utah route 78, at its junction with Utah route 28 in the town of Levan, Juab County (May 2020)

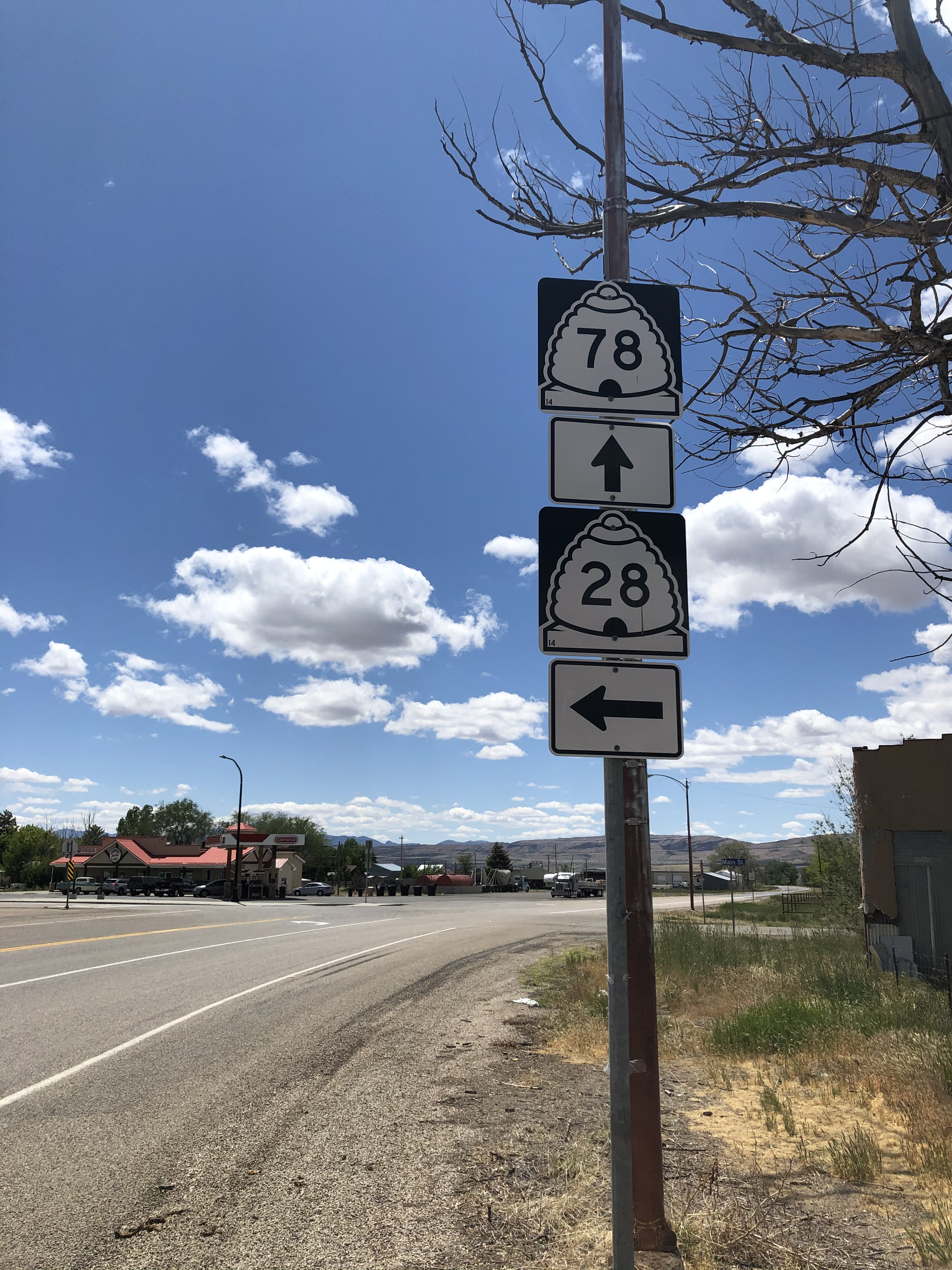
The eastern beginning of Utah route 78, at its junction with Utah route 28 in the town of Levan, Juab County (May 2020)
