= 1988 United States presidential election in Utah =

- November 8, 1988

Nominee	George H. W. Bush	Michael Dukakis
Party	Republican	Democratic
Home state	Texas	Massachusetts
Running mate	Dan Quayle	Lloyd Bentsen
Electoral vote	5	0
Popular vote	428,442	207,343
Percentage	66.22%	32.05%
County results
Bush
50–60%
60–70%
70–80%
80–90%
Dukakis
60–70%
President before election
Ronald Reagan
Republican
Elected President
George H. W. Bush
Republican

The 1988 United States presidential election in Utah took place on November 8, 1988. All fifty states and the District of Columbia, were part of the 1988 United States presidential election. State voters chose five electors to the Electoral College, which selected the president and vice president.

Utah was won by incumbent United States Vice President George H. W. Bush of Texas, who was running against Massachusetts Governor Michael Dukakis. Bush ran with Indiana Senator Dan Quayle as Vice President, and Dukakis ran with Texas Senator Lloyd Bentsen.

Utah weighed in for this election as 26% more Republican than the national average. The presidential election of 1988 was a very partisan election for Utah, with over 98 percent of the electorate voting for either the Republican or Democratic parties, though several other parties appeared on the ballot. Every county in Utah voted in majority for the Republican candidate, except for Carbon County, which voted primarily for Dukakis.

Bush won the election in Utah with a 34-point landslide – his strongest victory in the nation. He carried every county save heavily-unionized Carbon County. This was the fourth election in a row in which Utah gave the Republican nominee his highest vote share of any state in the country. Utah had voted heavily for William Jennings Bryan in 1896 and for Woodrow Wilson and Harry Truman in the two close elections of the first half of the 20th century, 1916 and 1948. However, like most of the rest of the Mountain West, Utah shifted toward the Republican Party in 1952, voting Republican in every subsequent election (as of 2024) save 1964, and voting for Johnson in 1964 by only 9.7%, amid Johnson's 22.6% national landslide.

== Results ==
1988 United States presidential election in Utah
Party	Candidate	Votes	%
Republican	George H. W. Bush	428,442	66.22%
Democratic	Michael Dukakis	207,343	32.05%
Libertarian	Ron Paul	7,473	1.16%
American	Delmar Dennis	2,158	0.33%
New Alliance	Lenora Fulani	455	0.07%
National Economic Recovery	Lyndon LaRouche	427	0.07%
Independent	Louis Youngkeit	372	0.06%
Socialist Workers	James Warren	209	0.03%
Socialist	Willa Kenoyer	129	0.02%
Total votes		647,008	100.00%

=== Results by county ===
County	George H. W. Bush Republican		Michael Dukakis Democratic		Ron Paul Libertarian		Delmar Dennis American		Other candidates Various parties		Margin		Total votes cast
County	#	%	#	%	#	%	#	%	#	%	#	%	Total votes cast
Beaver	1,286	60.89%	816	38.64%	7	0.33%	1	0.05%	2	0.09%	470	22.25%	2,112
Box Elder	12,585	81.40%	2,736	17.70%	95	0.61%	31	0.20%	14	0.09%	9,849	63.70%	15,461
Cache	21,766	77.84%	5,871	21.00%	182	0.65%	77	0.28%	67	0.24%	15,895	56.84%	27,963
Carbon	3,019	35.09%	5,521	64.18%	20	0.23%	19	0.22%	24	0.28%	-2,502	-29.09%	8,603
Daggett	272	66.02%	132	32.04%	5	1.21%	2	0.49%	1	0.24%	140	33.98%	412
Davis	50,469	73.80%	16,868	24.67%	706	1.03%	209	0.31%	132	0.19%	33,601	49.13%	68,384
Duchesne	3,118	70.82%	1,227	27.87%	33	0.75%	19	0.43%	6	0.14%	1,891	42.95%	4,403
Emery	2,322	56.03%	1,788	43.15%	12	0.29%	15	0.36%	7	0.17%	534	12.88%	4,144
Garfield	1,470	79.25%	370	19.95%	9	0.49%	2	0.11%	4	0.22%	1,100	59.30%	1,855
Grand	1,895	58.34%	1,287	39.62%	34	1.05%	17	0.52%	13	0.40%	608	18.72%	3,248
Iron	6,038	76.74%	1,736	22.06%	34	0.43%	45	0.57%	15	0.19%	4,302	54.68%	7,868
Juab	1,505	59.65%	974	38.60%	29	1.15%	11	0.44%	4	0.16%	531	21.05%	2,523
Kane	1,788	79.29%	398	17.65%	60	2.66%	9	0.40%	0	0.00%	1,390	61.64%	2,255
Millard	3,515	74.63%	1,124	23.86%	48	1.02%	13	0.28%	10	0.21%	2,391	50.77%	4,710
Morgan	1,889	73.59%	647	25.20%	15	0.58%	11	0.43%	5	0.19%	1,242	48.39%	2,567
Piute	476	69.29%	206	29.99%	4	0.58%	1	0.15%	0	0.00%	270	39.30%	687
Rich	621	72.21%	234	27.21%	2	0.23%	2	0.23%	1	0.12%	387	45.00%	860
Salt Lake	163,557	59.07%	107,453	38.81%	4,127	1.49%	901	0.33%	865	0.31%	56,104	20.26%	276,903
San Juan	2,377	61.95%	1,407	36.67%	19	0.50%	14	0.36%	20	0.52%	970	25.28%	3,837
Sanpete	4,579	70.26%	1,822	27.96%	63	0.97%	34	0.52%	19	0.29%	2,757	42.30%	6,517
Sevier	4,747	76.31%	1,403	22.55%	33	0.53%	35	0.56%	3	0.05%	3,344	53.76%	6,221
Summit	3,881	59.68%	2,536	39.00%	63	0.97%	11	0.17%	12	0.18%	1,345	20.68%	6,503
Tooele	5,539	56.50%	4,166	42.49%	57	0.58%	24	0.24%	18	0.18%	1,373	14.01%	9,804
Uintah	5,341	74.00%	1,799	24.92%	24	0.33%	33	0.46%	21	0.29%	3,542	49.08%	7,218
Utah	68,134	77.23%	18,533	21.01%	1,103	1.25%	318	0.36%	139	0.16%	49,601	56.22%	88,227
Wasatch	2,487	62.22%	1,451	36.30%	42	1.05%	11	0.28%	6	0.15%	1,036	25.92%	3,997
Washington	13,306	80.33%	3,054	18.44%	107	0.65%	72	0.43%	26	0.16%	10,252	61.89%	16,565
Wayne	784	68.59%	353	30.88%	2	0.17%	1	0.09%	3	0.26%	431	37.71%	1,143
Weber	39,676	63.97%	21,431	34.56%	538	0.87%	220	0.35%	153	0.25%	18,245	29.41%	62,018
Totals	428,442	66.22%	207,343	32.05%	7,473	1.16%	2,158	0.33%	1,592	0.25%	221,099	34.17%	647,008

==== Counties that flipped from Republican to Democratic ====
- Carbon

== See also ==
- United States presidential elections in Utah
- Presidency of George H. W. Bush
