= 1912 United States presidential election in Utah =

- November 5, 1912
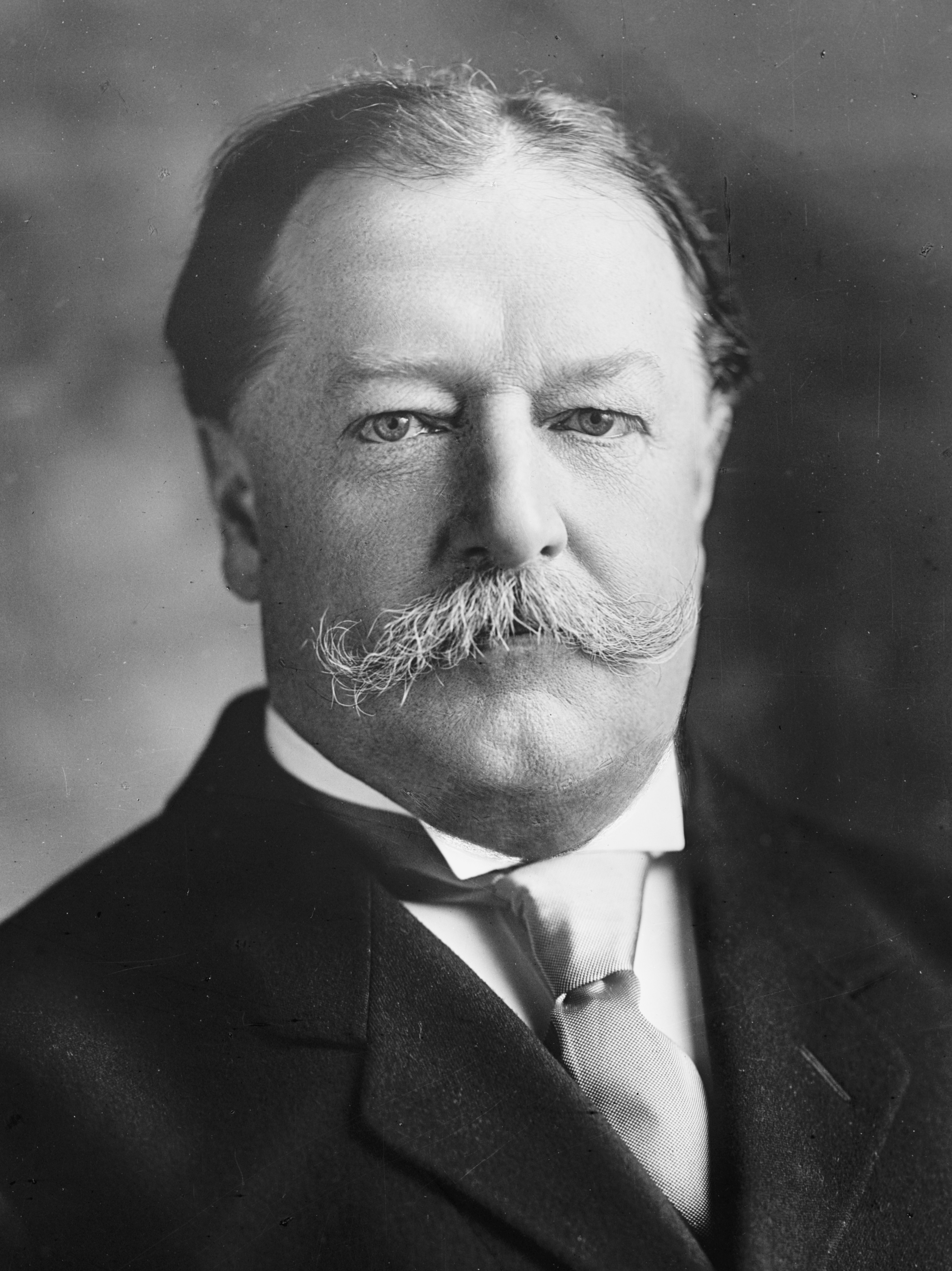

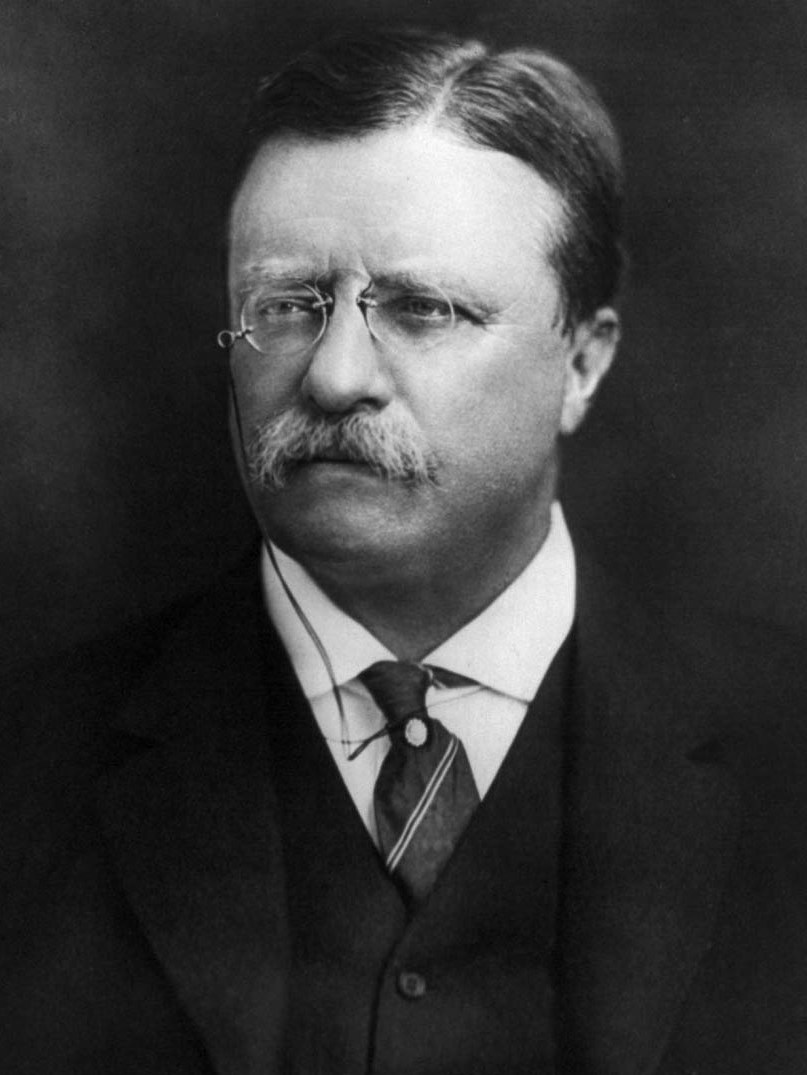

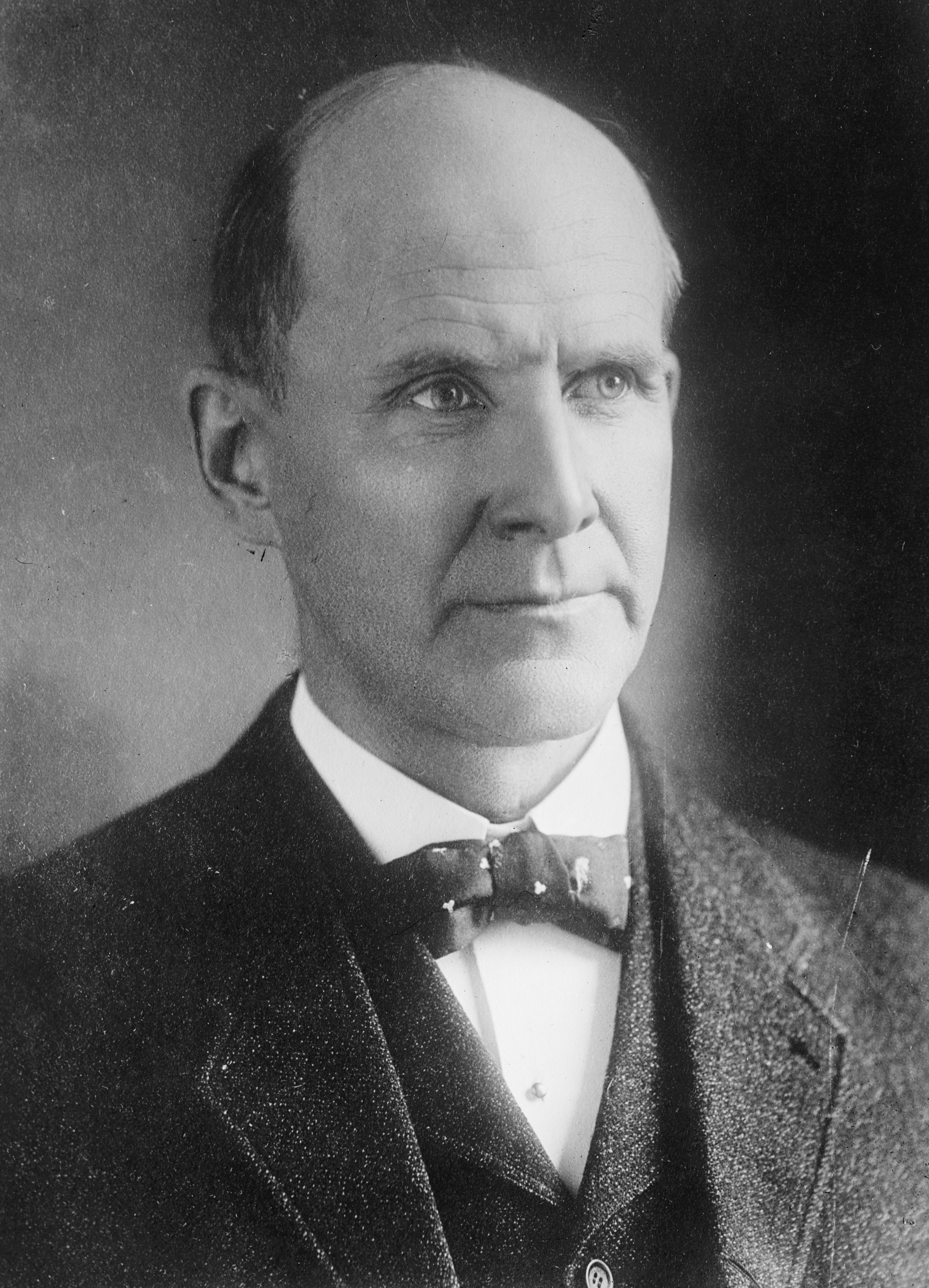
Nominee	William Howard Taft	Woodrow Wilson
Party	Republican	Democratic
Home state	Ohio	New Jersey
Running mate	Nicholas Murray Butler	Thomas R. Marshall
Electoral vote	4	0
Popular vote	42,100	36,579
Percentage	37.46%	32.55%
Nominee	Theodore Roosevelt	Eugene V. Debs
Party	Progressive	Socialist
Home state	New York	Indiana
Running mate	Hiram Johnson	Emil Seidel
Electoral vote	0	0
Popular vote	24,174	9,023
Percentage	21.51%	8.03%
County results
Taft
30–40%
40–50%
50–60%
60–70%
70–80%
Wilson
30–40%
40–50%
50–60%
Roosevelt
30–40%
Tie
President before election
William Howard Taft
Republican
Elected President
Woodrow Wilson
Democratic

The 1912 United States presidential election in Utah was held on November 5, 1912 as part of the 1912 United States presidential election. State voters chose four representatives, or electors to the Electoral College, who voted for president and vice president.

After being overwhelmingly carried by William Jennings Bryan in its first presidential election from its statehood year of 1896, Utah was to vote Republican by increasing margins in the following three elections, with only Washington County in the Dixie region voting Democratic in 1904 and 1908. By 1909, there were just two Democrats in the state legislature – a number fewer than any other state except Michigan during the middle 1900s and 1920s.

However, during William Howard Taft's presidency, his predecessor Theodore Roosevelt became bitterly opposed to his policies on foreign affairs and the opening of public lands to private concerns. and thus decided to run in Republican primaries. Roosevelt's personal popularity and a powerful speaking tour was sufficient for him to "steamroll" through primaries, but Taft was able to prevail as the Republican nominee through traditional machine and party tactics. Reformers bolted the Republicans and formed the "Progressive" or "Bull Moose" Party with Roosevelt as standard-bearer. Taft – already unpopular with the public and not enjoying being President – decided to run, not in expectation of being re-elected but rather to preserve the GOP apparatus for future conservative action.

Because Taft made little efforts to campaign, he lost easily in most states; however, in Utah, a powerful political machine under long-serving senator and Mormon Apostle Reed Smoot had been developed to counter the anti-Mormon "American Party", which had become the effective opposition to the Republicans in local elections and had elected mayors in Salt Lake City. Combined with a very prosperous rural economy in both the farming and mining sectors, this produced strong loyalty among local Mormon communities to Taft, who was also supported by the local Mormon and non-Mormon press. Those supporting Roosevelt were viewed as "insincere" and as "office-seekers", although latterly such press criticism was toned down.

Taft was thus able to hold the state, with the maintenance of tariffs being critical for the 52 percent of Utahans who were farmers in 1912. Wilson and Roosevelt were most successful in the remote, less Mormon areas east of the Wasatch Mountains, and in some urban areas with more progressive tendencies. Socialist Eugene Debs, in the most successful of his five presidential campaigns, obtained eight percent of the vote but did much better than this in some mining areas.

Utah became one of the only two states to vote for Taft in 1912, the other being Vermont, and with 37.46% of the popular vote made the state his strongest victory in the election. This was the last presidential election until 1960 in which Utah did not back the national winner, and remains the last time the state voted differently than neighboring Idaho.

== Results ==
General Election Results
Party	Pledged to	Elector	Votes
Republican Party	William Howard Taft	M. H. Walker	42,100
Republican Party	William Howard Taft	John N. Davis	42,067
Republican Party	William Howard Taft	Margaret Zane Witcher	42,015
Republican Party	William Howard Taft	Ephraim Homer	41,939
Democratic Party	Woodrow Wilson	Jesse Knight	36,579
Democratic Party	Woodrow Wilson	O. W. Powers	36,459
Democratic Party	Woodrow Wilson	James Andrus	36,350
Democratic Party	Woodrow Wilson	T. H. Fitzgerald	36,329
Progressive Party	Theodore Roosevelt	Myra M. De Wolfe	24,174
Progressive Party	Theodore Roosevelt	Mary G. Coulter	23,981
Progressive Party	Theodore Roosevelt	G. J. Carpenter	23,975
Progressive Party	Theodore Roosevelt	Hugo Deprezin	23,934
Socialist Party	Eugene V. Debs	A. L. Mitchell	9,023
Socialist Party	Eugene V. Debs	W. E. Warner	8,999
Socialist Party	Eugene V. Debs	George Huscher	8,983
Socialist Party	Eugene V. Debs	J. E. Gease	8,981
Socialist Labor Party	Arthur E. Reimer	James P. Erskine	510
Socialist Labor Party	Arthur E. Reimer	Marie L. Petersen	505
Socialist Labor Party	Arthur E. Reimer	Roy F. Southwick	503
Socialist Labor Party	Arthur E. Reimer	J. E. Guernsey	501
Votes cast (Note: Based on highest elector on each ticket)			112,386

=== Results by county ===
County	William Howard Taft Republican		Woodrow Wilson Democratic		Theodore Roosevelt Progressive		Eugene V. Debs Socialist		Arthur E. Reimer Socialist Labor		Margin		Total votes cast
County	#	%	#	%	#	%	#	%	#	%	#	%	Total votes cast
Beaver	671	39.75%	602	35.66%	307	18.19%	106	6.28%	2	0.12%	69	4.09%	1,688
Box Elder	1,650	40.61%	1,402	34.51%	936	23.04%	75	1.85%	0	0.00%	248	6.10%	4,063
Cache	2,825	37.92%	3,296	44.25%	1,173	15.75%	135	1.81%	20	0.27%	-471	-6.33%	7,449
Carbon	771	35.42%	514	23.61%	541	24.85%	344	15.80%	7	0.32%	230 (Note: In the county where Roosevelt ran second ahead of Wilson, margin given is Taft vote minus Roosevelt vote and percentage margin Taft percentage minus Roosevelt percentage.)	10.57%	2,177
Davis	1,295	44.36%	1,142	39.12%	460	15.76%	21	0.72%	1	0.03%	153	5.24%	2,919
Emery	760	37.04%	760	37.04%	336	16.37%	190	9.26%	6	0.29%	0	0.00%	2,052
Garfield	673	62.60%	249	23.16%	128	11.91%	23	2.14%	2	0.19%	424	39.44%	1,075
Grand	191	33.75%	212	37.46%	118	20.85%	45	7.95%	0	0.00%	-21	-3.71%	566
Iron	695	49.71%	544	38.91%	63	4.51%	95	6.80%	1	0.07%	151	10.80%	1,398
Juab	1,171	35.38%	985	29.76%	344	10.39%	800	24.17%	10	0.30%	186	5.62%	3,310
Kane	426	75.27%	115	20.32%	20	3.53%	5	0.88%	0	0.00%	311	54.95%	566
Millard	970	41.10%	865	36.65%	397	16.82%	123	5.21%	5	0.21%	105	4.45%	2,360
Morgan	318	36.59%	233	26.81%	273	31.42%	45	5.18%	0	0.00%	45	5.17%	869
Piute	205	37.41%	110	20.07%	146	26.64%	87	15.88%	0	0.00%	59	10.77%	548
Rich	329	48.89%	238	35.36%	100	14.86%	6	0.89%	0	0.00%	91	13.53%	673
Salt Lake	12,719	35.14%	10,468	28.92%	8,899	24.59%	3,798	10.49%	308	0.85%	2,251	6.22%	36,192
San Juan	146	37.24%	146	37.24%	96	24.49%	4	1.02%	0	0.00%	0	0.00%	392
Sanpete	2,488	41.98%	1,984	33.47%	1,272	21.46%	173	2.92%	10	0.17%	504	8.51%	5,927
Sevier	1,452	41.90%	915	26.41%	807	23.29%	287	8.28%	4	0.12%	537	15.49%	3,465
Summit	1,290	44.06%	983	33.57%	425	14.52%	226	7.72%	4	0.14%	307	10.49%	2,928
Tooele	950	44.21%	646	30.06%	261	12.15%	284	13.22%	8	0.37%	304	14.15%	2,149
Uintah	545	28.40%	566	29.49%	641	33.40%	165	8.60%	2	0.10%	-75 (Note: In this county where Taft ran third behind both Wilson and Roosevelt, margin given is Wilson vote minus Roosevelt vote and percentage margin Wilson percentage minus Roosevelt percentage.)	-3.91%	1,919
Utah	4,185	35.45%	4,636	39.26%	2,295	19.44%	664	5.62%	27	0.23%	-451	-3.81%	11,807
Wasatch	1,210	41.71%	957	32.99%	432	14.89%	294	10.13%	8	0.28%	253	8.72%	2,901
Washington	712	43.60%	842	51.56%	72	4.41%	6	0.37%	1	0.06%	-130	-7.96%	1,633
Wayne	282	52.03%	183	33.76%	24	4.43%	53	9.78%	0	0.00%	99	18.27%	542
Weber	3,171	29.31%	2,986	27.60%	3,608	33.35%	969	8.96%	84	0.78%	-437	-4.04%	10,818
Totals	42,100	37.46%	36,579	32.55%	24,174	21.51%	9,023	8.03%	510	0.45%	5,521	4.91%	112,386

==== Counties that flipped from Republican to Democratic ====
- Cache
- Grand
- Utah

==== Counties that flipped from Republican to Progressive ====
- Uintah
- Weber

== See also ==
- United States presidential elections in Utah
- 1912 United States presidential election in Vermont - President William Howard Taft's sole other win in 1912
