= 1936 United States presidential election in Utah =

- November 3, 1936

Nominee	Franklin D. Roosevelt	Alf Landon
Party	Democratic	Republican
Home state	New York	Kansas
Running mate	John N. Garner	Frank Knox
Electoral vote	4	0
Popular vote	150,246	64,555
Percentage	69.34%	29.79%
County results
Roosevelt
50–60%
60–70%
70–80%
Landon
50–60%
President before election
Franklin D. Roosevelt
Democratic
Elected President
Franklin D. Roosevelt
Democratic

The 1936 United States presidential election in Utah took place on November 3, 1936, as part of the 1936 United States presidential election. All contemporary forty-eight states took part in the national election, and Utah voters selected four voters to the Electoral College, who voted for president and vice president.

Since its landslide endorsement of William Jennings Bryan's "free silver" in its inaugural 1896 election, Utah had been a swing state apart from its support for embattled President William Howard Taft in 1912. Woodrow Wilson had carried the state easily in 1916 due to strong anti-war sentiment, but James M. Cox, John W. Davis and Robert M. La Follette did not win a single county between them in the 1920 and 1924 Republican landslides.

Vis-à-vis the rest of the nation, Utah had shown only a small anti-Hoover trend in 1932. During Landon's summer campaigning, Utah was targeted strongly as a state the GOP needed to carry to have a chance at the presidency. However, FDR's western public works programs, most notably Boulder Dam, had made him exceptionally popular in the rugged, arid West. Along with the potent campaigning of James Farley meant that, by the last week of October the Republicans were showing no interest in Utah, and this despite the opposition of the leadership of Utah's dominant Church of Jesus Christ of Latter-day Saints to Roosevelt's candidacy and policies, chiefly regarding the church's desire to remove Mormons from welfare rolls.

Utah, like every other state west of the Appalachian Mountains, voted for Franklin D. Roosevelt over Alf Landon by a substantial margin, making FDR the first (and only) Democrat to win the state more than once. Roosevelt won Utah by a landslide with 69.34 percent of the vote, which remains the second best Democratic result from the state behind William Jennings Bryan in the state's inaugural election of 1896.

Like Bryan, FDR won every county in the state except strongly Republican Kane County in the far south, which has only voted Democratic for Woodrow Wilson in 1916. Kane County was the westernmost county in the nation to vote for Landon, and one of only three west of the Continental Divide to do so. (Note: The others were Clark County, Idaho and Rio Blanco County, Colorado)

As of the 2024 presidential election, this is the last election in which Iron County, Sanpete County, Sevier County, San Juan County, and Garfield County have voted for a Democratic presidential candidate.

== Results ==
General Election Results
Party	Pledged to	Elector	Votes
Democratic Party	Franklin D. Roosevelt	E. A. Britsch	150,246
Democratic Party	Franklin D. Roosevelt	J. E. Wilson	150,002
Democratic Party	Franklin D. Roosevelt	Margaret G. Larsen	149,949
Democratic Party	Franklin D. Roosevelt	Mrs. Francis G. Callahan	149,932
Republican Party	Alf Landon	James A. Ivers	64,555
Republican Party	Alf Landon	Charles W. Morse	64,511
Republican Party	Alf Landon	Mrs. Sherman Christenson	64,440
Republican Party	Alf Landon	Mrs. G. D. Rutledge	64,369
Union Party	William Lemke	Ellen A. DeWitt	1,121
Union Party	William Lemke	Wesley Jacques	1,120
Union Party	William Lemke	James V. Leonard	1,119
Union Party	William Lemke	Frank E. Stark	1,112
Socialist Party	Norman Thomas	Vern Bullough	432
Socialist Party	Norman Thomas	Bert Westover	429
Socialist Party	Norman Thomas	Darwin Condie	423
Socialist Party	Norman Thomas	Otto E. Parson	422
Communist Party	Earl Browder	Dan Black	280
Communist Party	Earl Browder	Theodore Houston	280
Communist Party	Earl Browder	C. W. Matson	278
Communist Party	Earl Browder	Howard Brown	277
Prohibition Party	D. Leigh Colvin	Anna Flewelling	43
Prohibition Party	D. Leigh Colvin	C. E. Smith	43
Prohibition Party	D. Leigh Colvin	Julius Sheppard	42
Prohibition Party	D. Leigh Colvin	Leota K. Hutsinpillar	42
Votes cast (Note: Based on highest elector on each ticket)			216,677

=== Results by county ===
County	Franklin D. Roosevelt Democratic		Alf Landon Republican		William Lemke Union		Norman Thomas Socialist		Earl Browder Communist		D. Leigh Colvin Prohibition		Margin		Total votes cast
County	#	%	#	%	#	%	#	%	#	%	#	%	#	%	Total votes cast
Beaver	1,337	59.13%	913	40.38%	10	0.44%	1	0.04%	0	0.00%	0	0.00%	424	18.75%	2,261
Box Elder	5,001	69.16%	2,180	30.15%	44	0.61%	5	0.07%	1	0.01%	0	0.00%	2,821	39.01%	7,231
Cache	8,606	71.97%	3,258	27.25%	74	0.62%	13	0.11%	5	0.04%	1	0.01%	5,348	44.73%	11,957
Carbon	5,040	77.42%	1,348	20.71%	59	0.91%	26	0.40%	35	0.54%	2	0.03%	3,692	56.71%	6,510
Daggett	128	61.54%	78	37.50%	2	0.96%	0	0.00%	0	0.00%	0	0.00%	50	24.04%	208
Davis	3,920	67.80%	1,841	31.84%	14	0.24%	4	0.07%	2	0.03%	1	0.02%	2,079	35.96%	5,782
Duchesne	1,970	63.86%	1,070	34.68%	35	1.13%	9	0.29%	0	0.00%	1	0.03%	900	29.17%	3,085
Emery	1,909	66.54%	938	32.69%	11	0.38%	9	0.31%	0	0.00%	2	0.07%	971	33.84%	2,869
Garfield	928	52.37%	842	47.52%	0	0.00%	2	0.11%	0	0.00%	0	0.00%	86	4.85%	1,772
Grand	521	64.40%	272	33.62%	12	1.48%	4	0.49%	0	0.00%	0	0.00%	249	30.78%	809
Iron	1,844	56.07%	1,396	42.44%	12	0.36%	37	1.12%	0	0.00%	0	0.00%	448	13.62%	3,289
Juab	2,319	68.67%	1,027	30.41%	17	0.50%	13	0.38%	1	0.03%	0	0.00%	1,292	38.26%	3,377
Kane	395	43.03%	519	56.54%	2	0.22%	2	0.22%	0	0.00%	0	0.00%	-124	-13.51%	918
Millard	2,313	60.34%	1,466	38.25%	42	1.10%	12	0.31%	0	0.00%	0	0.00%	847	22.10%	3,833
Morgan	739	60.18%	483	39.33%	6	0.49%	0	0.00%	0	0.00%	0	0.00%	256	20.85%	1,228
Piute	611	64.25%	339	35.65%	0	0.00%	1	0.11%	0	0.00%	0	0.00%	272	28.60%	951
Rich	488	55.45%	388	44.09%	4	0.45%	0	0.00%	0	0.00%	0	0.00%	100	11.36%	880
Salt Lake	62,386	71.77%	23,819	27.40%	382	0.44%	155	0.18%	177	0.20%	10	0.01%	38,567	44.37%	86,929
San Juan	520	54.11%	432	44.95%	5	0.52%	3	0.31%	1	0.10%	0	0.00%	88	9.16%	961
Sanpete	3,959	58.67%	2,738	40.57%	39	0.58%	9	0.13%	0	0.00%	3	0.04%	1,221	18.09%	6,748
Sevier	2,816	59.07%	1,899	39.84%	34	0.71%	10	0.21%	8	0.17%	0	0.00%	917	19.24%	4,767
Summit	2,344	61.95%	1,422	37.58%	7	0.18%	7	0.18%	4	0.11%	0	0.00%	922	24.37%	3,784
Tooele	2,361	69.46%	1,029	30.27%	5	0.15%	2	0.06%	2	0.06%	0	0.00%	1,332	39.19%	3,399
Uintah	1,986	60.96%	1,193	36.62%	71	2.18%	8	0.25%	0	0.00%	0	0.00%	793	24.34%	3,258
Utah	14,387	69.52%	6,173	29.83%	62	0.30%	44	0.21%	24	0.12%	5	0.02%	8,214	39.69%	20,695
Wasatch	1,299	55.66%	1,029	44.09%	1	0.04%	4	0.17%	0	0.00%	1	0.04%	270	11.57%	2,334
Washington	2,005	63.37%	1,145	36.19%	9	0.28%	4	0.13%	1	0.03%	0	0.00%	860	27.18%	3,164
Wayne	522	61.12%	329	38.52%	2	0.23%	0	0.00%	0	0.00%	1	0.12%	193	22.60%	854
Weber	17,594	77.08%	4,989	21.86%	160	0.70%	48	0.21%	19	0.08%	16	0.07%	12,605	55.22%	22,826
Total	150,246 (Note: There is a slight discrepancy with the county results for Democratic elector Britsch; the results by county add up to 150,248 rather than the stated 150,246.)	69.34%	64,555	29.79%	1,121	0.52%	432	0.20%	280	0.13%	43	0.02%	85,691	39.55%	216,677

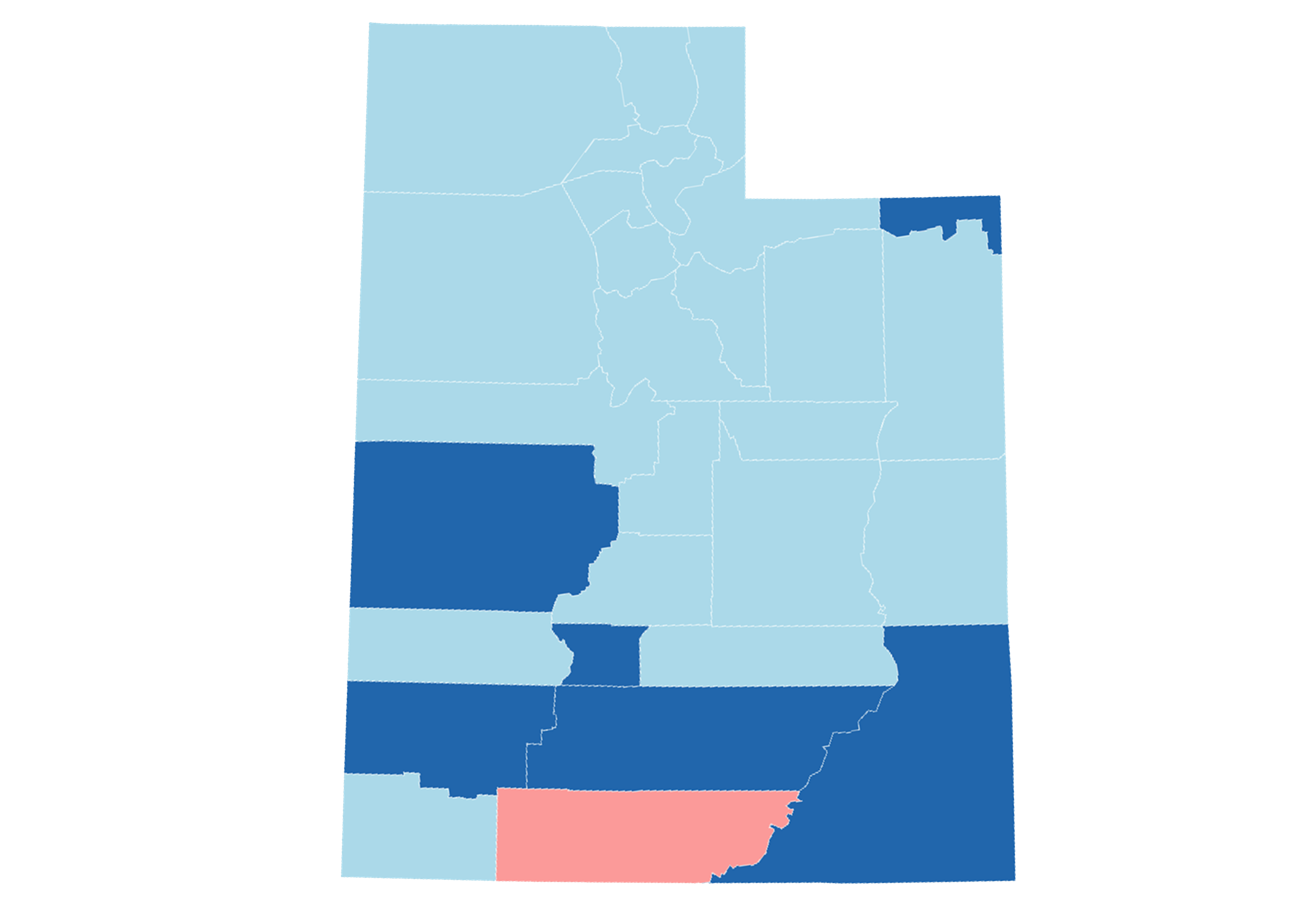
Utah county flips 1932-36: Democratic Hold Gain from Republican

==== Counties that flipped from Republican to Democratic ====
- Daggett
- Garfield
- Iron
- Millard
- Piute
- San Juan

== See also ==
- United States presidential elections in Utah
