= 1940 United States presidential election in Utah =

- November 5, 1940

Nominee	Franklin D. Roosevelt	Wendell Willkie
Party	Democratic	Republican
Home state	New York	New York
Running mate	Henry A. Wallace	Charles L. McNary
Electoral vote	4	0
Popular vote	154,277	93,151
Percentage	62.25%	37.59%
County results
Roosevelt
50–60%
60–70%
Willkie
50–60%
60–70%
President before election
Franklin D. Roosevelt
Democratic
Elected President
Franklin D. Roosevelt
Democratic

The 1940 United States presidential election in Utah took place on November 5, 1940, as part of the 1940 United States presidential election. All contemporary forty-eight states took part, and state voters selected four voters to the Electoral College, who voted for president and vice president.

Utah, like every other state west of the Continental Divide, voted for Franklin D. Roosevelt over Wendell Willkie by a substantial margin. This was the first time any Democrat won the state more than twice. Roosevelt landslided Utah with 62.25 percent of the vote. The percentage, however, wasn't as large as his victory in the state four years earlier. As of the 2024 presidential election, this is the last election in which Piute County voted for a Democratic presidential candidate.

== Results ==
General Election Results
Party	Pledged to	Elector	Votes
Democratic Party	Franklin D. Roosevelt	Oscar W. McConckie	154,277
Democratic Party	Franklin D. Roosevelt	Mrs. George S. Baliff	153,833
Democratic Party	Franklin D. Roosevelt	Joseph Jensen	153,734
Democratic Party	Franklin D. Roosevelt	Sophus Bertleson	153,473
Republican Party	Wendell Willkie	S. Marion Bliss	93,151
Republican Party	Wendell Willkie	Mrs. R. L. Ashby	92,973
Republican Party	Wendell Willkie	Clarence Dahl	92,852
Republican Party	Wendell Willkie	John W. Guild	92,356
Socialist Party	Norman Thomas	J. D. DeFriez	200
Socialist Party	Norman Thomas	Isabel Adamson	198
Socialist Party	Norman Thomas	William J. McConnell	198
Socialist Party	Norman Thomas	Emil Munez	197
Communist Party	Earl Browder	David Douglas Jr.	191
Communist Party	Earl Browder	Marguerite H. Forest	188
Communist Party	Earl Browder	Hyrum James Woolman	188
Communist Party	Earl Browder	William Mathrus	185
Votes cast (Note: Based on highest elector on each ticket)			247,819

=== Results by county ===
County	Franklin D. Roosevelt Democratic		Wendell Willkie Republican		Norman Thomas Socialist		Earl Browder Communist		Margin		Total votes cast
County	#	%	#	%	#	%	#	%	#	%	Total votes cast
Beaver	1,303	54.18%	1,101	45.78%	1	0.04%	0	0.00%	202	8.40%	2,405
Box Elder	4,736	59.30%	3,248	40.67%	2	0.03%	0	0.00%	1.488	18.63%	7,986
Cache	7,867	60.25%	5,184	39.70%	6	0.05%	1	0.01%	2,683	20.55%	13,058
Carbon	5,180	69.47%	2,242	30.07%	10	0.13%	24	0.32%	2,938	39.40%	7,456
Daggett	160	62.50%	96	37.50%	0	0.00%	0	0.00%	64	25.00%	256
Davis	3,865	57.63%	2,836	42.28%	1	0.01%	5	0.07%	1,029	15.34%	6,707
Duchesne	1,982	59.92%	1,322	39.96%	4	0.12%	0	0.00%	660	19.95%	3,308
Emery	1,901	65.13%	1,006	34.46%	10	0.34%	2	0.07%	895	30.66%	2,919
Garfield	814	44.14%	1,030	55.86%	0	0.00%	0	0.00%	-216	-11.71%	1,844
Grand	446	50.62%	432	49.04%	3	0.34%	0	0.00%	14	1.59%	881
Iron	1,915	47.90%	2,060	51.53%	21	0.53%	2	0.05%	-145	-3.63%	3,998
Juab	2,136	60.12%	1,412	39.74%	5	0.14%	0	0.00%	724	20.38%	3,553
Kane	339	33.43%	675	66.57%	0	0.00%	0	0.00%	-336	-33.14%	1,014
Millard	2,302	54.10%	1,943	45.66%	7	0.16%	3	0.07%	359	8.44%	4,255
Morgan	699	54.87%	575	45.13%	0	0.00%	0	0.00%	124	9.73%	1,274
Piute	466	51.21%	442	48.57%	1	0.11%	1	0.11%	24	2.64%	910
Rich	475	51.52%	447	48.48%	0	0.00%	0	0.00%	28	3.04%	922
Salt Lake	67,318	65.40%	35,427	34.42%	66	0.06%	115	0.11%	31,891	30.98%	102,926
San Juan	515	49.19%	528	50.43%	1	0.10%	3	0.29%	-13	-1.24%	1,047
Sanpete	3,524	48.61%	3,722	51.34%	3	0.04%	1	0.04%	-198	-2.73%	7,250
Sevier	2,521	48.22%	2,703	51.70%	4	0.08%	0	0.00%	-182	-3.48%	5,228
Summit	2,215	56.10%	1,730	43.82%	0	0.00%	3	0.08%	485	12.28%	3,948
Tooele	2,625	63.90%	1,476	35.93%	7	0.17%	0	0.00%	1,149	27.97%	4,108
Uintah	1,773	52.16%	1,624	47.78%	2	0.06%	0	0.00%	149	4.38%	3,399
Utah	15,168	63.32%	8,740	36.48%	23	0.10%	25	0.10%	6,428	26.83%	23,956
Wasatch	1,502	55.59%	1,199	44.37%	0	0.00%	1	0.04%	303	11.21%	2,702
Washington	1,993	55.04%	1,625	44.88%	2	0.06%	1	0.03%	368	10.16%	3,621
Wayne	500	56.75%	380	43.13%	1	0.11%	0	0.00%	120	13.62%	881
Weber	18,037	69.35%	7,946	30.55%	20	0.08%	4	0.02%	10,091	38.80%	26,007
Totals	154,277	62.25%	93,151	37.59%	200	0.08%	191	0.08%	61,126	24.67%	247,819

==== Counties that flipped from Democratic to Republican ====
- Garfield
- Iron
- San Juan
- Sanpete
- Sevier

== See also ==
- United States presidential elections in Utah
