= 1944 United States presidential election in Utah =

- November 7, 1944

Nominee	Franklin D. Roosevelt	Thomas E. Dewey
Party	Democratic	Republican
Home state	New York	New York
Running mate	Harry S. Truman	John W. Bricker
Electoral vote	4	0
Popular vote	150,088	97,891
Percentage	60.44%	39.42%
County results
Roosevelt
50–60%
60–70%
Dewey
50–60%
60–70%
70–80%
President before election
Franklin D. Roosevelt
Democratic
Elected President
Franklin D. Roosevelt
Democratic

The 1944 United States presidential election in Utah took place on November 7, 1944, as part of the 1944 United States presidential election. All contemporary forty-eight states took part, and state voters selected four voters to the Electoral College, who voted for president and vice president.

The Democratic Party candidate, President Franklin D. Roosevelt, won the state of Utah with 60.44 percent of the popular vote. The Republican Party candidate, Thomas E. Dewey, garnered 39.42 percent of the popular vote. As of the 2024 presidential election, this is the last election in which the following counties voted for a Democratic presidential candidate: Washington, Millard, Box Elder, Cache, and Rich. This is also the last time that a Democrat won 60% or more of the state's vote or carried the state by double-digits.

This was the final election in which Utah voters chose presidential electors directly. The state switched to the modern short ballot in the following election.

== Results ==
General Election Results
Party	Pledged to	Elector	Votes
Democratic Party	Franklin D. Roosevelt	Parnell Black	150,088
Democratic Party	Franklin D. Roosevelt	Charles H. Semken	149,843
Democratic Party	Franklin D. Roosevelt	Roxey S. Romney	149,837
Democratic Party	Franklin D. Roosevelt	Edward J. McPollin	149,823
Republican Party	Thomas E. Dewey	J. Paul Thomas	97,891
Republican Party	Thomas E. Dewey	James A. Kelly	97,863
Republican Party	Thomas E. Dewey	Mrs. Robert L. Judd	97,833
Republican Party	Thomas E. Dewey	David R. Roberts	97,815
Socialist Party	Norman Thomas	R. W. Bulloch	340
Socialist Party	Norman Thomas	Will H. Price	334
Socialist Party	Norman Thomas	Jens C. Peterson	333
Socialist Party	Norman Thomas	A. L. Porter	333
Votes cast (Note: Based on highest elector on each ticket)			248,319

=== Results by county ===
County	Franklin D. Roosevelt Democratic		Thomas E. Dewey Republican		Norman Thomas Socialist		Margin		Total votes cast
County	#	%	#	%	#	%	#	%	Total votes cast
Beaver	1,128	54.02%	958	45.88%	2	0.10%	170	8.14%	2,088
Box Elder	4,138	57.46%	3,058	42.47%	5	0.07%	1,080	15.00%	7,201
Cache	6,998	58.57%	4,938	41.33%	12	0.10%	2,060	17.24%	11,948
Carbon	5,364	69.70%	2,318	30.12%	14	0.18%	3,046	39.58%	7,696
Daggett	98	56.65%	75	43.35%	0	0.00%	23	13.29%	173
Davis	5,179	58.51%	3,663	41.39%	9	0.10%	1,516	17.13%	8,851
Duchesne	1,629	58.83%	1,140	41.17%	0	0.00%	489	17.66%	2,769
Emery	1,427	59.41%	974	40.55%	1	0.04%	453	18.86%	2,402
Garfield	559	39.87%	842	60.06%	1	0.07%	-283	-20.19%	1,402
Grand	380	46.74%	428	52.64%	5	0.62%	-48	-5.90%	813
Iron	1,677	46.31%	1,930	53.30%	14	0.39%	-253	-6.99%	3,621
Juab	1,483	55.34%	1,192	44.48%	5	0.19%	291	10.86%	2,680
Kane	244	26.93%	662	73.07%	0	0.00%	-418	-46.14%	906
Millard	1,909	50.20%	1,889	49.67%	5	0.13%	20	0.53%	3,803
Morgan	671	55.64%	535	44.36%	0	0.00%	136	11.28%	1,206
Piute	346	47.59%	381	52.41%	0	0.00%	-35	-4.81%	727
Rich	395	50.06%	394	49.94%	0	0.00%	1	0.13%	789
Salt Lake	66,114	62.61%	39,327	37.24%	157	0.15%	26,787	25.37%	105,598
San Juan	367	41.66%	513	58.23%	1	0.11%	-146	-16.57%	881
Sanpete	3,071	49.00%	3,196	51.00%	0	0.00%	-125	-1.99%	6,267
Sevier	2,095	47.13%	2,345	52.76%	5	0.11%	-250	-5.62%	4,445
Summit	1,761	54.32%	1,479	45.62%	2	0.06%	282	8.70%	3,242
Tooele	2,802	61.46%	1,753	38.45%	4	0.09%	1,049	23.01%	4,559
Uintah	1,519	50.63%	1,479	49.30%	2	0.07%	40	1.33%	3,000
Utah	15,722	61.14%	9,946	38.68%	45	0.18%	5,776	22.46%	25,713
Wasatch	1,249	54.09%	1,058	45.82%	2	0.09%	191	8.27%	2,309
Washington	1,694	51.80%	1,575	48.17%	1	0.03%	119	3.64%	3,270
Wayne	430	56.95%	325	43.05%	0	0.00%	105	13.91%	755
Weber	19,639	67.25%	9,518	32.59%	48	0.16%	10,121	34.66%	29,205
Totals	150,088	60.44%	97,891	39.42%	340	0.14%	52,197	21.02%	248,319

==== Counties that flipped from Democratic to Republican ====
- Grand
- Piute

== See also ==
- United States presidential elections in Utah
