= Senator Bischoff =

Senator Bischoff may refer to:

- Bob Bischoff (born 1941), Indiana State Senate
- Douglas Bischoff (1936–1991), Utah State Senate
