= 1976 United States presidential election in Utah =

- November 2, 1976

Nominee	Gerald Ford	Jimmy Carter
Party	Republican	Democratic
Home state	Michigan	Georgia
Running mate	Bob Dole	Walter Mondale
Electoral vote	4	0
Popular vote	337,908	182,110
Percentage	62.44%	33.65%
County results
Ford
50–60%
60–70%
70–80%
Carter
40–50%
50–60%
President before election
Gerald Ford
Republican
Elected President
Jimmy Carter
Democratic

The 1976 United States presidential election in Utah took place on November 2, 1976. All 50 states and the District of Columbia, were part of the 1976 United States presidential election. State voters chose four electors to the Electoral College, which selected the president and vice president of the United States.

Utah was won by incumbent Republican President Gerald Ford over the Democratic nominee, Jimmy Carter. Ford took 62.44% of the vote in the state, while Carter took 33.65%, making Utah around 31% more Republican than the nation in the 1976 election.

Utah was Ford's strongest state in the nation in terms of percentage of the vote, although unlike in Vermont, Ford didn't win every county in Utah. For a presidential candidate who lost the election nationwide, Ford won a record 27 states, a record which stands to this day, but Utah was the only state where Ford broke 60% of the vote statewide. Carter won the election nationwide, and despite the election solidifying Utah's place within the core of the Republican heartland (which it retains to this day), 1976 stands as the last occasion where a Democrat has carried Emery County, where Carter obtained a fifty-four vote plurality win. After Nixon's clean sweep of all twenty-nine counties in 1972, Carter would also win Carbon County with 59.39% of the vote, but Ford won absolute majorities in all twenty-seven remaining Utah counties, with his total vote ranging from 50.34% in Tooele County to 72.50% in Kane County. Ronald Reagan would repeat Nixon's 1972 clean sweep in both his elections, and no county in Utah except Carbon and Tooele would ever vote against a Republican until 2008.

== Results ==
1976 United States presidential election in Utah (Note: The digitized version of the state's official election abstract is of poor quality but can be deciphered with enough effort.)
Party	Candidate	Votes	%
Republican	Gerald Ford (inc.)	337,908	62.44%
Democratic	Jimmy Carter	182,110	33.65%
American	Thomas J. Anderson	13,284	2.45%
Independent (Note: Officially listed in Utah as "Candidate by Court Order")	Eugene McCarthy	3,907	0.72%
Libertarian	Roger MacBride	2,438	0.45%
Concerned Citizens	Lester Maddox	1,162	0.21%
Independent (Note: Affiliated with the Socialist Workers Party nationally, officially listed in Utah as "Candidate by Court Order")	Peter Camejo	268	0.05%
Independent (Note: Affiliated with the Communist Party nationally, officially listed in Utah as "Candidate by Court Order")	Gus Hall	121	0.02%
Total votes		541,198	100.00%

=== Results by county ===
County	Gerald Ford Republican		Jimmy Carter Democratic		Thomas Anderson American		Eugene McCarthy Independent		Roger MacBride Libertarian		Other candidates Various parties		Margin		Total votes cast
County	#	%	#	%	#	%	#	%	#	%	#	%	#	%	Total votes cast
Beaver	1,088	52.41%	963	46.39%	10	0.48%	6	0.29%	4	0.19%	5	0.24%	125	6.02%	2,076
Box Elder	9,319	69.02%	3,353	24.84%	729	5.40%	45	0.33%	34	0.25%	21	0.16%	5,966	44.18%	13,501
Cache	16,636	71.73%	5,430	23.41%	752	3.24%	246	1.06%	67	0.29%	63	0.27%	11,206	48.32%	23,194
Carbon	3,360	38.70%	5,157	59.39%	86	0.99%	34	0.39%	33	0.38%	13	0.15%	-1,797	-20.69%	8,683
Daggett	217	59.45%	131	35.89%	14	3.84%	3	0.82%	0	0.00%	0	0.00%	86	23.56%	365
Davis	31,216	66.28%	14,084	29.90%	1,052	2.23%	374	0.79%	226	0.48%	145	0.31%	17,132	36.38%	47,097
Duchesne	2,619	65.77%	1,110	27.88%	242	6.08%	8	0.20%	1	0.03%	2	0.05%	1,509	37.89%	3,982
Emery	1,717	47.13%	1,771	48.61%	106	2.91%	27	0.74%	13	0.36%	9	0.25%	-54	-1.48%	3,643
Garfield	1,163	65.48%	539	30.35%	51	2.87%	11	0.62%	6	0.34%	6	0.34%	624	35.13%	1,776
Grand	1,781	62.38%	931	32.61%	62	2.17%	42	1.47%	26	0.91%	13	0.46%	850	29.77%	2,855
Iron	4,757	69.62%	1,700	24.88%	270	3.95%	55	0.80%	36	0.53%	15	0.22%	3,057	44.74%	6,833
Juab	1,290	51.58%	1,091	43.62%	92	3.68%	15	0.60%	9	0.36%	4	0.16%	199	7.96%	2,501
Kane	1,094	72.50%	330	21.87%	73	4.84%	8	0.53%	4	0.27%	0	0.00%	764	50.63%	1,509
Millard	2,484	62.68%	1,224	30.89%	218	5.50%	17	0.43%	9	0.23%	11	0.28%	1,260	31.79%	3,963
Morgan	1,356	62.95%	701	32.54%	78	3.62%	9	0.42%	3	0.14%	7	0.32%	655	30.41%	2,154
Piute	377	55.85%	265	39.26%	24	3.56%	3	0.44%	5	0.74%	1	0.15%	112	16.59%	675
Rich	541	67.12%	248	30.77%	13	1.61%	2	0.25%	2	0.25%	0	0.00%	293	36.35%	806
Salt Lake	144,100	60.35%	86,659	36.29%	3,796	1.59%	2,122	0.89%	1,321	0.55%	780	0.33%	57,441	24.06%	238,777
San Juan	1,856	57.60%	1,182	36.69%	143	4.44%	23	0.71%	11	0.34%	7	0.22%	674	20.91%	3,222
Sanpete	3,683	62.06%	1,925	32.43%	275	4.63%	31	0.52%	13	0.22%	8	0.13%	1,758	29.63%	5,935
Sevier	3,686	65.24%	1,564	27.68%	357	6.32%	15	0.27%	20	0.35%	8	0.14%	2,122	37.56%	5,650
Summit	2,316	61.55%	1,282	34.07%	77	2.05%	61	1.62%	23	0.61%	4	0.11%	1,034	27.48%	3,763
Tooele	4,657	50.34%	4,371	47.25%	127	1.37%	47	0.51%	27	0.29%	22	0.24%	286	3.09%	9,251
Uintah	4,017	69.18%	1,342	23.11%	404	6.95%	31	0.53%	16	0.28%	7	0.12%	2,675	46.07%	5,807
Utah	49,328	69.48%	18,327	25.82%	2,604	3.67%	266	0.37%	239	0.34%	207	0.29%	31,001	43.66%	70,993
Wasatch	1,940	61.59%	1,092	34.67%	73	2.32%	26	0.83%	14	0.44%	5	0.16%	848	26.92%	3,150
Washington	5,944	70.64%	1,893	22.50%	467	5.55%	40	0.48%	36	0.43%	34	0.40%	4,051	48.14%	8,414
Wayne	555	59.11%	334	35.57%	34	3.62%	7	0.75%	3	0.32%	6	0.64%	221	23.54%	939
Weber	34,811	58.33%	23,111	38.72%	1,055	1.77%	329	0.55%	230	0.39%	148	0.25%	11,700	19.61%	59,684
Totals	337,908	62.44%	182,110	33.65%	13,284	2.45%	3,907	0.72%	2,438	0.45%	1,551	0.29%	155,798	28.79%	541,198

==== Counties that flipped from Republican to Democratic ====
- Carbon
- Emery

=== By congressional district ===
Ford won both congressional districts, including one held by a Democrat.

District	Ford	Carter	Representative
1st	67.3%	32.7%	K. Gunn McKay
2nd	62.8%	37.2%	David Daniel Marriott

== See also ==
- United States presidential elections in Utah
