= 1984 United States presidential election in Utah =

- November 6, 1984

Nominee	Ronald Reagan	Walter Mondale
Party	Republican	Democratic
Home state	California	Minnesota
Running mate	George H. W. Bush	Geraldine Ferraro
Electoral vote	5	0
Popular vote	469,105	155,369
Percentage	74.50%	24.68%
County results
Reagan
40–50%
50–60%
60–70%
70–80%
80–90%
President before election
Ronald Reagan
Republican
Elected President
Ronald Reagan
Republican

The 1984 United States presidential election in Utah took place on November 6, 1984. All 50 states and the District of Columbia, were part of the 1984 United States presidential election. State voters chose five electors to the Electoral College, which selected the president and vice president of the United States. Utah was won by incumbent United States President Ronald Reagan of California, who was running against former Vice President Walter Mondale of Minnesota. Reagan ran for a second time with incumbent Vice President and former C.I.A. Director George H. W. Bush of Texas, and Mondale ran with Representative Geraldine Ferraro of New York, the first major female candidate for the vice presidency.

The presidential election of 1984 was a very partisan election for Utah, with just over 99% of the electorate voting for either the Democratic or Republican parties, though several other parties appeared on the ballot. Reagan posted the highest vote share of any nominee in the state since William Jennings Bryan in 1896, and carried every county in the state. Reagan's best county was Box Elder County, although he broke 80% in 15 counties. Mondale's best county was Carbon County, the only one in which he managed to hold Reagan to a plurality, rather than a majority win. Mondale did make gains vis-à-vis Jimmy Carter of over ten percent in eastern Daggett County and San Juan County, probably related to a general trend in this election of Native American voters towards Mondale. The highly populated Salt Lake County contributed about half of the Democratic votes produced by Utah, but still was won decisively by Reagan by 40 points, in what was, overall, a very solid statewide victory.

Reagan won a resounding 50-point landslide victory in Utah, his strongest victory in the nation both by vote share and by margin. For the third election in a row, Utah gave the Republican nominee his highest vote share in the nation, a trend that began in 1976 and would continue through 1988, and intermittently through 2012. Reagan's strength in Utah was part of a broader phenomenon of the growing importance of the Mountain West as a Republican base; this region had been a swing region for the sixty years following James Weaver's Populist run in 1892, solidly backing William Jennings Bryan in his narrow 1896 defeat as well as Woodrow Wilson and Harry Truman in their narrow 1916 and 1948 wins, respectively. The Mountain West began trending Republican in close elections in 1960, however, when Nixon carried all but two states in the region (New Mexico and Nevada). Jimmy Carter's presidency accelerated the trend, with his administration's policies on water and energy being widely perceived as a 'war on the West’. In 1980, Carter underperformed even his low national percentage throughout the West. Reagan's popularity in the West increased in 1984, no Republican nominee has received such strong support in the Mountain West as Reagan did.

Enid Greene Mickelsen and Jon Huntsman Jr. were co-directors of Reagan's campaign in the state.

David D. Fowers, at age 18, was the youngest presidential elector in history according to the Congressional Research Service. Fowers threatened to vote for Lyndon LaRouche as a faithless elector to protest the electoral college, but chose not to. The other electors were Charles W. Akerlow, Douglas Bischoff, Cathy Arentz, and William A. Stevenson.

== Results ==
1984 United States presidential election in Utah
Party	Candidate	Votes	%
Republican	Ronald Reagan (inc.)	469,105	74.50%
Democratic	Walter Mondale	155,369	24.68%
Libertarian	David Bergland	2,447	0.39%
American	Delmar Dennis	1,345	0.21%
Citizens	Sonia Johnson	844	0.13%
Utah Independent Alliance	Dennis Serrette	220	0.03%
Communist	Gus Hall	184	0.03%
Socialist Workers	Melvin T. Mason	142	0.02%
Total votes		629,656	100.00%

=== Results by county ===
County	Ronald Reagan Republican		Walter Mondale Democratic		David Bergland Libertarian		Delmar Dennis American		Other candidates Various parties		Margin		Total
County	#	%	#	%	#	%	#	%	#	%	#	%	Total
Beaver	1,516	67.95%	708	31.73%	2	0.09%	3	0.13%	2	0.09%	808	36.22%	2,231
Box Elder	13,243	86.65%	1,983	12.98%	24	0.16%	20	0.13%	13	0.09%	11,260	73.67%	15,283
Cache	22,127	83.68%	4,123	15.59%	83	0.31%	48	0.18%	61	0.23%	18,004	68.09%	26,442
Carbon	4,393	49.82%	4,357	49.41%	24	0.27%	22	0.25%	22	0.25%	36	0.41%	8,818
Daggett	296	56.38%	227	43.24%	1	0.19%	1	0.19%	0	0.00%	69	13.14%	525
Davis	49,863	80.29%	11,727	18.88%	223	0.36%	193	0.31%	96	0.15%	38,136	61.41%	62,102
Duchesne	4,437	85.16%	746	14.32%	9	0.17%	14	0.27%	4	0.08%	3,691	70.84%	5,210
Emery	3,081	69.41%	1,326	29.87%	6	0.14%	17	0.38%	9	0.20%	1,755	39.54%	4,439
Garfield	1,609	83.15%	315	16.28%	1	0.05%	1	0.05%	9	0.47%	1,294	66.87%	1,935
Grand	2,463	73.15%	876	26.02%	10	0.30%	8	0.24%	10	0.30%	1,587	47.13%	3,367
Iron	6,856	83.09%	1,342	16.26%	16	0.19%	24	0.29%	13	0.16%	5,514	66.83%	8,251
Juab	1,902	67.23%	917	32.41%	2	0.07%	4	0.14%	4	0.14%	985	34.82%	2,829
Kane	1,710	85.12%	294	14.63%	2	0.10%	2	0.10%	1	0.05%	1,416	70.49%	2,009
Millard	4,345	78.11%	1,192	21.43%	13	0.23%	11	0.20%	2	0.04%	3,153	56.68%	5,563
Morgan	1,934	79.59%	481	19.79%	9	0.37%	3	0.12%	3	0.12%	1,453	59.80%	2,430
Piute	606	80.05%	151	19.95%	0	0.00%	0	0.00%	0	0.00%	455	60.10%	757
Rich	797	85.61%	131	14.07%	3	0.32%	0	0.00%	0	0.00%	666	71.54%	931
Salt Lake	183,536	69.28%	78,488	29.63%	1,531	0.58%	495	0.19%	876	0.33%	105,048	39.65%	264,926
San Juan	2,598	69.13%	1,145	30.47%	8	0.21%	3	0.08%	4	0.11%	1,453	38.66%	3,758
Sanpete	5,507	81.26%	1,227	18.11%	15	0.22%	22	0.32%	6	0.09%	4,280	63.15%	6,777
Sevier	5,736	83.49%	1,072	15.60%	8	0.12%	49	0.71%	5	0.07%	4,664	67.89%	6,870
Summit	4,093	71.79%	1,539	27.00%	34	0.60%	16	0.28%	19	0.33%	2,554	44.79%	5,701
Tooele	6,478	63.95%	3,584	35.38%	21	0.21%	29	0.29%	18	0.18%	2,894	28.57%	10,130
Uintah	7,337	85.57%	1,186	13.83%	21	0.24%	19	0.22%	11	0.13%	6,151	71.74%	8,574
Utah	72,284	82.61%	14,801	16.91%	176	0.20%	163	0.19%	80	0.09%	57,483	65.70%	87,504
Wasatch	2,789	72.93%	1,015	26.54%	5	0.13%	12	0.31%	3	0.08%	1,774	46.39%	3,824
Washington	12,049	86.21%	1,846	13.21%	23	0.16%	46	0.33%	13	0.09%	10,203	73.00%	13,977
Wayne	930	80.24%	224	19.33%	1	0.09%	2	0.17%	2	0.17%	706	60.91%	1,159
Weber	44,590	70.40%	18,346	28.97%	176	0.28%	119	0.19%	103	0.16%	26,244	41.43%	63,334
Totals	469,105	74.50%	155,369	24.68%	2,447	0.39%	1,345	0.21%	1,390	0.22%	313,736	49.82%	629,656

== Analysis ==
At 74.50%, Reagan won Utah with the highest percentage of the vote in any state from the presidential elections since 1984, although fellow Republican Mitt Romney did come close to surpassing that margin when he won this state with 72.62% in 2012. Despite his high margin, at a victory margin of 49.82%, he won the state by a slightly reduced margin than in 1980, when he won Utah by 52.2%. Mondale improved on Jimmy Carter's 1980 margins by over 10% in Daggett County and San Juan County, as well as improving slightly in Morgan County. Reagan improved in Iron County, Garfield County, Piute County, Wayne County, Duchesne County, Weber County, and Summit County.

== See also ==
- United States presidential elections in Utah
- Presidency of Ronald Reagan
