= 1932 United States presidential election in Utah =

- November 8, 1932

Nominee	Franklin D. Roosevelt	Herbert Hoover
Party	Democratic	Republican
Home state	New York	California
Running mate	John N. Garner	Charles Curtis
Electoral vote	4	0
Popular vote	116,750	84,795
Percentage	56.52%	41.05%
County results
Roosevelt
40–50%
50–60%
60–70%
Hoover
40–50%
50–60%
60–70%
70–80%
President before election
Herbert Hoover
Republican
Elected President
Franklin D. Roosevelt
Democratic

The 1932 United States presidential election in Utah took place on November 8, 1932, as part of the 1932 United States presidential election. All contemporary forty-eight states took part, and state voters selected four voters to the Electoral College, who voted for president and vice president.

Utah, like every state west of the Appalachian Mountains, voted for Franklin D. Roosevelt over Herbert Hoover by a substantial margin, giving the first Democratic victory in the state since 1916 when anti-war sentiment had shifted the state to Woodrow Wilson. Utah's swing to the Democrats was 23.19 percentage points, much smaller than the national swing of 35.18 percentage points, as the anti-Catholicism which marred the preceding election was less prevalent among the LDS hierarchy than in the South or the Pacific Northwest. Consequently, for this election Utah voted more Republican than the nation at-large for the first time in twenty years, by a margin of 2.29 points on a two-party basis. Hoover managed to retain pluralities in seven of Utah's twenty-nine counties, although in San Juan County Hoover won by only a solitary vote and in sparsely populated Daggett County by just eleven. This was nonetheless equal with Missouri (Note: It might be noted that of the Missouri counties remaining Republican, Ozark, Taney, Gasconade and Putnam have never voted Democratic since the Civil War, Douglas not since 1896, whilst Warren and Hickory never voted Democratic between 1864 and 1988.) and behind only Kansas (Note: In Kansas, Hoover retained thirteen of 104 counties, of which Doniphan has never voted for a Democrat, Brown not since 1912, and Osborne not since 1916) as the most counties in one state west of the Mississippi – in all of which Hoover retained only forty-six counties out of 1,161 – remaining Republican.

Herbert Hoover, who had been elected in a third consecutive Republican landslide in 1928, was to become extremely unpopular by the time he was up for re-election in 1932, owing to unemployment rising to a whopping twenty-five percent and Hoover's Smoot-Hawley Tariff (proposed by long-serving Utah Senator Reed Smoot) had cut severely into exports due to retaliatory tariffs from foreign governments.

The Mountain States, including Utah, were even more severely hit by the economic downturn than the national average: Utah's lost consumption between the 1929 crash and the election was about one standard deviation above the national mean. There was also extreme concern over the falling price of silver, of which Utah was a major producer.

In a poll conducted by the Literary Digest, Hoover was far behind Roosevelt in all western states, whose electoral votes the Republican Party had monopolized during the three preceding elections. Paul Mallon in his "National Whirlgig" two weeks before the election suggested Roosevelt had a "degree of chance" in Utah, but that the Democrats were certain of victory in the nation as a whole.

== Results ==
General Election Results
Party	Pledged to	Elector	Votes
Democratic Party	Franklin D. Roosevelt	Mrs. Clarence C. Neslen	116,750
Democratic Party	Franklin D. Roosevelt	John E. Welch	116,638
Democratic Party	Franklin D. Roosevelt	Mrs. Frank A. Drury	116,330
Democratic Party	Franklin D. Roosevelt	Mrs. W. S. Greenwood	116,292
Republican Party	Herbert Hoover	Robert D. Young	84,795
Republican Party	Herbert Hoover	Fred Rich	84,761
Republican Party	Herbert Hoover	M. O. Packard	84,664
Republican Party	Herbert Hoover	Mrs. C. P. Overfield	84,513
Socialist Party	Norman Thomas	Ruby L. Webber	4,087
Socialist Party	Norman Thomas	Nathaniel Steimle	4,081
Socialist Party	Norman Thomas	Ida Foster	4,078
Socialist Party	Norman Thomas	A. W. Clemons	4,077
Communist Party	William Z. Foster	George Johnson	946
Communist Party	William Z. Foster	V. B. Austin	934
Communist Party	William Z. Foster	Annie Brauning	929
Communist Party	William Z. Foster	Enoch Wallgren	929
Votes cast (Note: Based on highest elector on each ticket)			206,578

=== Results by county ===
County	Franklin D. Roosevelt Democratic		Herbert Hoover Republican		Norman Thomas Socialist		William Z. Foster Communist		Margin		Total votes cast
County	#	%	#	%	#	%	#	%	#	%	Total votes cast
Beaver	1,218	55.34%	969	44.03%	14	0.64%	0	0.00%	249	11.31%	2,201
Box Elder	3,695	54.12%	3,048	44.65%	78	1.14%	6	0.09%	647	9.48%	6,827
Cache	6,522	56.99%	4,829	42.20%	80	0.70%	13	0.11%	1,693	14.79%	11,444
Carbon	4,239	69.26%	1,655	27.04%	215	3.51%	11	0.18%	2,584	42.22%	6,120
Daggett	79	46.47%	90	52.94%	1	0.59%	0	0.00%	-11	-6.47%	170
Davis	3,006	53.51%	2,562	45.60%	41	0.73%	9	0.16%	444	7.90%	5,618
Duchesne	1,590	51.76%	1,333	43.39%	145	4.72%	4	0.13%	257	8.37%	3,072
Emery	1,613	56.64%	1,112	39.04%	120	4.21%	3	0.11%	501	17.59%	2,848
Garfield	493	29.99%	1,125	68.43%	26	1.58%	0	0.00%	-632	-38.44%	1,644
Grand	506	62.86%	278	34.53%	21	2.61%	0	0.00%	228	28.32%	805
Iron	1,358	42.93%	1,599	50.55%	206	6.51%	0	0.00%	-241	-7.62%	3,163
Juab	1,969	60.68%	1,220	37.60%	55	1.69%	1	0.03%	749	23.08%	3,245
Kane	229	26.63%	618	71.86%	13	1.51%	0	0.00%	-389	-45.23%	860
Millard	1,881	48.79%	1,916	49.70%	57	1.48%	1	0.03%	-35	-0.91%	3,855
Morgan	602	51.23%	568	48.34%	5	0.43%	0	0.00%	34	2.89%	1,175
Piute	403	47.19%	433	50.70%	18	2.11%	0	0.00%	-30	-3.51%	854
Rich	469	54.09%	398	45.91%	0	0.00%	0	0.00%	71	8.19%	867
Salt Lake	48,012	58.34%	32,224	39.16%	1,332	1.62%	724	0.88%	15,788	19.19%	82,292
San Juan	459	48.83%	460	48.94%	19	2.02%	2	0.21%	-1	-0.11%	940
Sanpete	3,600	52.69%	3,147	46.06%	86	1.26%	0	0.00%	453	6.63%	6,833
Sevier	2,303	50.14%	2,225	48.44%	64	1.39%	1	0.02%	78	1.70%	4,593
Summit	2,028	57.35%	1,434	40.55%	72	2.04%	2	0.06%	594	16.80%	3,536
Tooele	1,865	56.12%	1,407	42.34%	48	1.44%	3	0.09%	458	13.78%	3,323
Uintah	1,778	55.74%	1,355	42.48%	51	1.60%	6	0.19%	423	13.26%	3,190
Utah	12,140	59.12%	7,953	38.73%	346	1.68%	97	0.47%	4,187	20.39%	20,536
Wasatch	1,103	50.99%	1,042	48.17%	18	0.83%	0	0.00%	61	2.82%	2,163
Washington	1,648	54.09%	1,378	45.22%	20	0.66%	1	0.03%	270	8.86%	3,047
Wayne	401	49.63%	398	49.26%	8	0.99%	1	0.12%	3	0.37%	808
Weber	11,541	56.16%	8,019	39.02%	928	4.52%	61	0.30%	3,522	17.14%	20,549
Totals	116,750	56.52%	84,795	41.05%	4,087	1.98%	946	0.46%	31,955	15.47%	206,578

==== Counties that flipped from Republican to Democratic ====
- Box Elder
- Beaver
- Cache
- Davis
- Duchesne
- Emery
- Grand
- Morgan
- Salt Lake
- Rich
- Sanpete
- Sevier
- Summit
- Tooele
- Utah
- Uintah
- Washington
- Wasatch
- Wayne
- Weber

== See also ==
- United States presidential elections in Utah
