= 1904 United States presidential election in Utah =

- November 8, 1904
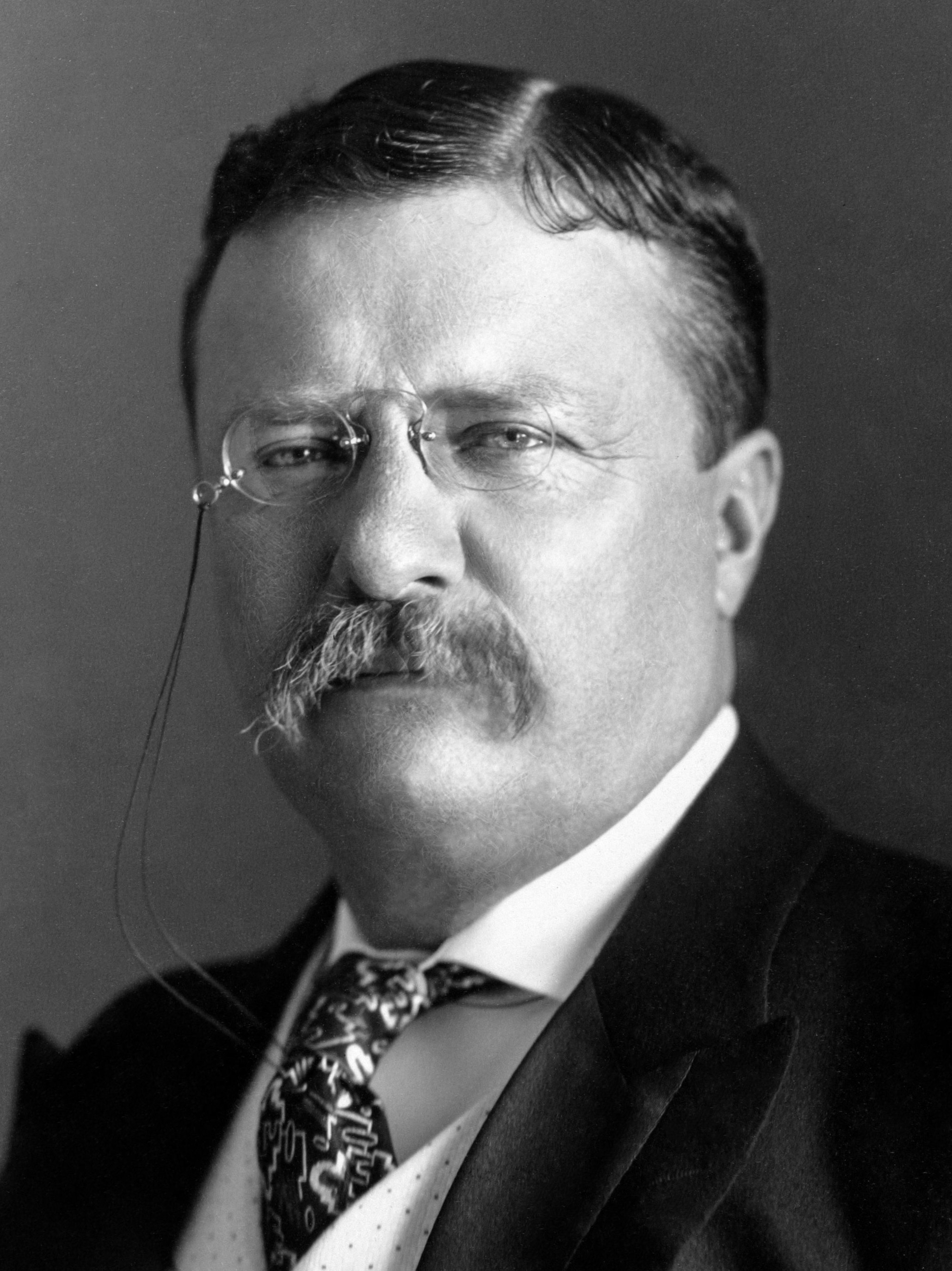

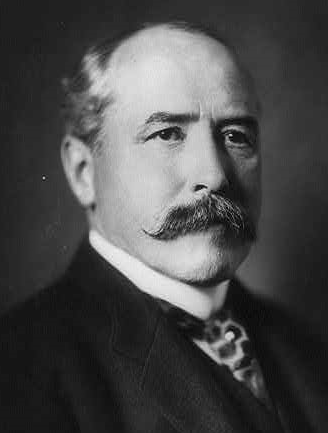

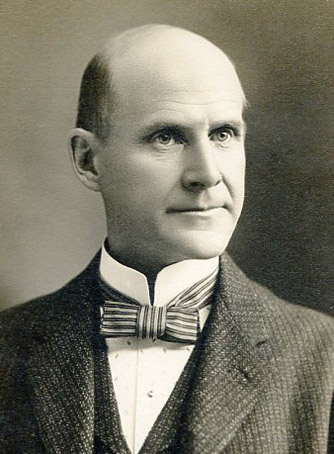
Nominee	Theodore Roosevelt	Alton B. Parker	Eugene V. Debs
Party	Republican	Democratic	Socialist
Home state	New York	New York	Indiana
Running mate	Charles W. Fairbanks	Henry G. Davis	Ben Hanford
Electoral vote	3	0	0
Popular vote	62,446	33,413	5,767
Percentage	61.42%	32.86%	5.67%
County results
Roosevelt
40–50%
50–60%
60–70%
70–80%
Parker
50–60%
President before election
Theodore Roosevelt
Republican
Elected President
Theodore Roosevelt
Republican

The 1904 United States presidential election in Utah was held on November 8, 1904, throughout all forty-five contemporary states as part of the 1904 United States presidential election. State voters chose three representatives, or electors to the Electoral College, who voted for president and vice president.

In its first presidential election during its statehood year, Utah – with its large reserves of silver – had voted five-to-one for Democrat/Populist William Jennings Bryan, who ran on a platform of monetizing silver. However, with a revived economy, Utah moved much closer to the national mainstream in the ensuring 1900 election, as pre-statehood Republican Party hostility to the dominant LDS church gradually disappeared after the outlawing of polygyny in 1890.

In between Utah's second and third presidential elections, newly elected but unseated senator and Mormon apostle Reed Smoot went much further towards reversing the nineteenth-century hostility of the Republican Party to the Latter Day Saints. At a time when most traditional Protestant congressmen were opposed to Smoot being seated because religious influence was feared, Mormon prophet and LDS Church President Joseph F. Smith said explicitly that members of the LDS Church should in political matters obey their consciences. Smoot – although a Republican – had been targeted by both major parties in the two years between his election by the Utah Legislature in 1902 and the 1904 presidential campaign, but he corresponded consistently with incumbent president Roosevelt.

Smoot's work was one factor allowing Roosevelt to sweep twenty-six of Utah's twenty-seven contemporary counties and carry the state by 28.55 percentage points, which even in the largest landslide since the beginning of widespread popular voting for presidential electors made Utah 9.73 percentage points more Republican than the nation at-large. Another was that Parker himself was hostile to Mormon polygamy, still another was the popularity in the West of Roosevelt's conservation and trust-busting policies.

Roosevelt's percentage of the popular vote and margin would not be bested by any Republican in Utah until Dwight D. Eisenhower’s re-election in 1956.

== Results ==
General Election Results
Party	Pledged to	Elector	Votes
Republican Party	Theodore Roosevelt	E. W. Wade	62,446
Republican Party	Theodore Roosevelt	James A. Miner	62,403
Republican Party	Theodore Roosevelt	H. P. Myton	62,208
Democratic Party	Alton B. Parker	Fred J. Kiesel	33,413
Democratic Party	Alton B. Parker	Edward H. Snow	33,379
Democratic Party	Alton B. Parker	Samuel Newhouse	33,342
Socialist Party	Eugene V. Debs	J. H. Zenger	5,767
Socialist Party	Eugene V. Debs	J. W. McCann	5,752
Socialist Party	Eugene V. Debs	A. C. Jacobson	5,749
Write-in		Scattering	46
Votes cast (Note: Based on highest elector on each ticket)			101,672

=== Results by county ===
County	Theodore Roosevelt Republican		Alton B. Parker Democratic		Eugene V. Debs Socialist		Margin		Total votes cast
County	#	%	#	%	#	%	#	%	Total votes cast
Beaver	869	58.17%	593	39.69%	32	2.14%	276	18.48%	1,494
Box Elder	2,400	66.76%	1,151	32.02%	44	1.22%	1,249	34.74%	3,595
Cache	4,008	56.89%	2,948	41.85%	89	1.26%	1,060	15.04%	7,045
Carbon	1,224	65.38%	508	27.14%	140	7.48%	716	38.24%	1,872
Davis	1,657	56.19%	1,255	42.56%	25	0.85%	402	13.63%	2,949 (Note: Includes 12 Scattering votes)
Emery	905	56.67%	583	36.51%	109	6.83%	322	20.16%	1,597
Garfield	679	70.14%	252	26.03%	37	3.82%	427	44.11%	968
Grand	262	57.21%	165	36.03%	31	6.77%	97	21.18%	458
Iron	741	58.72%	442	35.02%	79	6.26%	299	23.70%	1,262
Juab	1,493	48.32%	1,206	39.03%	391	12.65%	287	9.29%	3,090
Kane	399	79.64%	102	20.36%	0	0.00%	297	59.28%	501
Millard	1,001	59.23%	683	40.41%	6	0.36%	318	18.82%	1,690
Morgan	492	57.28%	315	36.67%	52	6.05%	177	20.61%	859
Piute	358	48.12%	228	30.65%	158	21.24%	130	17.47%	744
Rich	439	64.65%	240	35.35%	0	0.00%	199	29.30%	679
Salt Lake	20,665	65.10%	8,389	26.43%	2,691	8.48%	12,276	38.67%	31,745
San Juan	135	78.49%	36	20.93%	1	0.58%	99	57.56%	172
Sanpete	3,829	66.65%	1,741	30.30%	175	3.05%	2,088	36.35%	5,745
Sevier	1,725	59.10%	930	31.86%	264	9.04%	795	27.24%	2,919
Summit	2,232	57.87%	1,358	35.21%	267	6.92%	874	22.66%	3,857
Tooele	1,289	63.44%	639	31.45%	104	5.12%	650	31.99%	2,032
Uintah	753	50.40%	630	42.17%	111	7.43%	123	8.23%	1,494
Utah	6,490	59.15%	4,243	38.67%	239	2.18%	2,247	20.48%	10,972
Wasatch	1,042	60.79%	656	38.27%	16	0.93%	386	22.52%	1,714
Washington	718	48.38%	761	51.28%	5	0.34%	-43	-2.90%	1,484
Wayne	310	53.26%	251	43.13%	21	3.61%	59	10.13%	582
Weber	6,331	62.36%	3,108	30.61%	680	6.70%	3,223	31.74%	10,153 (Note: Includes 34 Scattering votes)
Totals	62,446	61.42%	33,413	32.86%	5,767	5.67%	29,033	28.56%	101,672

==== Counties that flipped from Democratic to Republican ====
- Cache
- Davis
- Emery
- Grand
- Iron
- Juab
- Summit
- Uintah
- Wasatch

== See also ==
- United States presidential elections in Utah
