= 1908 United States presidential election in Utah =

- November 3, 1908

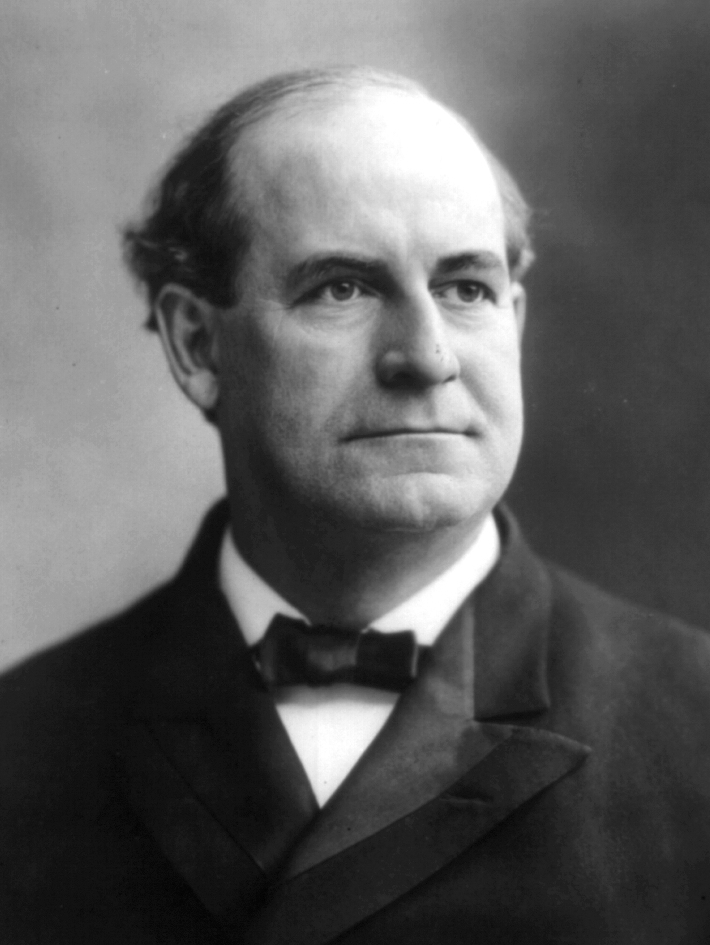
Nominee	William Howard Taft	William Jennings Bryan
Party	Republican	Democratic
Home state	Ohio	Nebraska
Running mate	James S. Sherman	John W. Kern
Electoral vote	3	0
Popular vote	61,028	42,601
Percentage	56.19%	39.22%
County results
Taft
40–50%
50–60%
60–70%
70–80%
Bryan
50–60%
President before election
Theodore Roosevelt
Republican
Elected President
William Howard Taft
Republican

The 1908 United States presidential election in Utah was held on November 3, 1908, throughout all forty-six contemporary states as part of the 1908 United States presidential election. State voters chose three representatives, or electors to the Electoral College, who voted for president and vice president. This was the last election when Utah had the minimum three electoral votes as it would gain a second congressional district after the 1910 Census.

Although Democrat/Populist Bryan had carried Utah in its debut presidential election by a five-to-one margin, the Republican Party – ditching ancestral hostility to the state's dominant Mormon religion – was soon able to take control of the state, despite a threat from the anti-Mormon "American Party" in urban areas with sizeable non-Mormon ("Gentile") populations. In its third election of 1904, Utah had given a virtual two-to-one majority for Theodore Roosevelt against New York Democrat Alton B. Parker, who carried only Dixie's Washington County.

Believing that the election could only be won in the West and Midwest, Bryan – who had had no trouble winning a third Democratic nomination – chose Indiana's John Worth Kern as his running mate. However, although many in the media supported the election of Bryan and praised his policies, the rapid recovery from the "Panic of 1907" meant that Bryan struggled severely in the Progressive-minded Western States once campaigning began.

The antagonism towards Bryan of business meant that Taft had little trouble repeating Theodore Roosevelt's triumph of 1904, although Bryan was able to cut Alton Parker's losing margin from 29 to 17 percentage points. Taft would win Utah by a margin of 17.04%. A powerful socialist movement in mining districts failed to equal Debs' support from the 1904 election as his policies were not considered feasible or were co-opted by the two major parties. Taft was further helped by the unseating of delegates for Bryan as a result of conflict between pro- and anti-Mormon factions.

Four years later, Utah would become one of the only two states that Taft would carry in his attempt for reelection, the other being Vermont.

== Results ==
General Election Results
Party	Pledged to	Elector	Votes
Republican Party	William Howard Taft	Lafayette Holbrook	61,028
Republican Party	William Howard Taft	Thomas Sevy	61,015
Republican Party	William Howard Taft	Henry Cohn	60,968
Democratic Party	William Jennings Bryan	Frank B. Stephens	42,601
Democratic Party	William Jennings Bryan	Aquilla Nebeker	42,554
Democratic Party	William Jennings Bryan	James Andrus	42,400
Socialist Party	Eugene V. Debs	R. Leggett	4,895
Socialist Party	Eugene V. Debs	M. M. Johnson	4,875
Socialist Party	Eugene V. Debs	J. C. Edgar	4,822
Independence Party	Thomas L. Hisgen	Abner N. Thompson	87
Independence Party	Thomas L. Hisgen	Frank J. Tierney	81
Independence Party	Thomas L. Hisgen	D. D. Crawford	80
Write-in		Scattering	2
Votes cast (Note: Based on highest elector on each ticket)			108,613

=== Results by county ===
County	William Howard Taft Republican		William Jennings Bryan Democratic		Eugene V. Debs Socialist		Thomas L. Hisgen Independence		Margin		Total votes cast
County	#	%	#	%	#	%	#	%	#	%	Total votes cast
Beaver	945	56.02%	714	42.32%	27	1.60%	1	0.06%	231	13.69%	1,687
Box Elder	2,396	62.15%	1,417	36.76%	40	1.04%	2	0.05%	979	25.40%	3,855
Cache	3,787	52.81%	3,317	46.26%	64	0.89%	3	0.04%	470	6.55%	7,171
Carbon	1,023	59.82%	581	33.98%	106	6.20%	0	0.00%	442	25.85%	1,710
Davis	1,736	55.89%	1,331	42.85%	34	1.09%	5	0.16%	405	13.04%	3,106
Emery	1,097	54.74%	749	37.38%	158	7.88%	0	0.00%	348	17.37%	2,004
Garfield	722	68.50%	290	27.51%	42	3.98%	0	0.00%	432	40.99%	1,054
Grand	232	48.74%	215	45.17%	24	5.04%	5	1.05%	17	3.57%	476
Iron	712	55.80%	488	38.24%	76	5.86%	0	0.00%	224	17.55%	1,276
Juab	1,615	48.40%	1,421	42.58%	300	8.99%	1	0.03%	194	5.81%	3,337
Kane	415	79.81%	102	19.62%	3	0.58%	0	0.00%	313	60.19%	520
Millard	1,011	55.73%	765	42.17%	38	2.09%	0	0.00%	246	13.56%	1,814
Morgan	494	58.19%	306	36.04%	49	5.77%	0	0.00%	188	22.14%	849
Piute	333	56.54%	157	26.66%	98	16.64%	1	0.17%	176	29.88%	589
Rich	425	59.44%	285	39.86%	5	0.70%	0	0.00%	140	19.58%	715
Salt Lake	20,805	58.02%	12,954	36.12%	2,059	5.74%	41	0.11%	7,851	21.89%	35,859
San Juan	130	53.06%	109	44.49%	3	1.22%	3	1.22%	21	8.57%	245
Sanpete	3,334	57.76%	2,307	39.97%	128	2.22%	1	0.02%	1,027	17.79%	5,772 (Note: Includes 2 Scattering votes)
Sevier	1,780	54.94%	1,272	39.26%	187	5.77%	1	0.03%	508	15.68%	3,240
Summit	1,614	50.87%	1,402	44.19%	148	4.66%	9	0.28%	212	6.68%	3,173
Tooele	1,106	56.03%	808	40.93%	59	2.99%	1	0.05%	298	15.10%	1,974
Uintah	778	48.44%	683	42.53%	145	9.03%	0	0.00%	95	5.92%	1,606
Utah	6,373	54.82%	4,984	42.87%	267	2.30%	2	0.02%	1,389	11.95%	11,626
Wasatch	1,265	53.83%	985	41.91%	98	4.17%	2	0.09%	280	11.91%	2,350
Washington	740	47.56%	810	52.06%	5	0.32%	1	0.06%	-70	-4.50%	1,556
Wayne	279	49.91%	184	32.92%	96	17.17%	0	0.00%	95	16.99%	559
Weber	5,881	56.06%	3,965	37.80%	636	6.06%	8	0.08%	1,916	18.27%	10,490
Total	61,028	56.19%	42,601	39.22%	4,895	4.51%	87	0.08%	18,427	16.97%	108,613

== See also ==
- United States presidential elections in Utah
