= United States presidential elections in Utah =

Presidential elections in Utah
- Number of elections: 33
- Voted Democratic: 8
- Voted Republican: 25
- Voted other: 0
- Voted for winning candidate: 24
- Voted for losing candidate: 9

Utah is a state in the Mountain West sub-region of the Western United States. Since its admission to the Union in January 1896, it has participated in 32 United States presidential elections. In the 1896 presidential election, the first presidential election in which the state participated, Utah was won in a landslide by Democrat William Jennings Bryan, who received almost 83 percent of the state's vote. 1896 was the only election in which Utah voted for a losing Democratic candidate. The state would quickly swing towards the Republican Party in the years that followed, although it would remain a swing state at the presidential level well into the 1940s. In the 1912 election, Utah was one of only two states won by incumbent Republican President William Howard Taft. However, the state would vote for the Democratic nominee by a large margin in 1916, 1932, 1936, 1940, and 1944, and by a narrow margin in 1948. However, since the latter election, the state has become very heavily Republican and has only voted for a Democratic presidential nominee once (in 1964, amidst a national Democratic landslide).

In the 1992 presidential election, Utah was one of only two states in which independent Ross Perot finished second, placing ahead of Democrat Bill Clinton. In the 2016 presidential election, independent Evan McMullin ran as an independent and won almost 21.5% of the vote in the state, his strongest performance in the nation. As of 2020, the Republican Party has won Utah in 17 of the last 18 presidential elections. Recent national surveys show Utah to be one of the most Republican states in the nation.

== Presidential elections ==
Key for parties
American Independent Party – (AI)
American Party – (A)
Constitution Party – (CP)
Democratic Party – (D)
Farmer-Labor Party – (FL)
Green Party – (G)
Independent candidate – (I)
Libertarian Party – (LI)
Progressive Party (1912) – (PR-1912)
Progressive Party (1924) – (PR-1924)
Progressive Party (1948) – (PR-1948)
Reform Party – (RE)
Republican Party – (R)
Socialist Party of America – (S)
Socialist Workers Party – (SW)
Union Party – (U)
Note – A double dagger (‡) indicates the national winner.

Presidential elections in Utah from 1896 to present
Year	Winner			Runner-up			Other candidate (Note: For the purpose of this list, other candidates are defined as those who finished in third place in the state.)			EV	Ref.
Year	Candidate	Votes	%	Candidate	Votes	%	Candidate	Votes	%	EV	Ref.
1896	William Jennings Bryan (D)	64,607	82.73%	William McKinley (R) ‡	13,491	17.27%	–	–	–	3	
1900	William McKinley (R) ‡	47,089	50.59%	William Jennings Bryan (D)	44,949	48.3%	Eugene V. Debs (S)	717	0.77%	3	
1904	Theodore Roosevelt (R)‡	62,446	61.45%	Alton B. Parker (D)	33,413	32.88%	Eugene V. Debs (S)	5,767	5.67%	3	
1908	William Howard Taft (R)‡	61,165	56.24%	William Jennings Bryan (D)	42,610	39.18%	Eugene V. Debs (S)	4,890	4.5%	3	
1912	William Howard Taft (R)	42,013	37.42%	Woodrow Wilson (D)‡	36,576	32.58%	Theodore Roosevelt (PR-1912)	24,174	21.53%	4	(Note: The American Socialist Party's candidate Eugene Debs received 8,999 votes (8.02%).)
1916	Woodrow Wilson (D)‡	84,145	58.78%	Charles Evans Hughes (R)	54,137	37.82%	Allan L. Benson (S)	4,460	3.12%	4	
1920	Warren G. Harding (R) ‡	81,555	55.93%	James M. Cox (D)	56,639	38.84%	Parley P. Christensen (FL)	4,475	3.07%	4	
1924	Calvin Coolidge (R) ‡	77,327	49.26%	John W. Davis (D)	47,001	29.94%	Robert M. La Follette (PR-1924)	32,662	20.81%	4	
1928	Herbert Hoover (R)‡	94,618	53.58%	Al Smith (D)	80,985	45.86%	Norman Thomas (S)	954	0.54%	4	
1932	Franklin D. Roosevelt (D)‡	116,750	56.52%	Herbert Hoover (R)	84,795	41.05%	Norman Thomas (S)	4,087	1.98%	4	
1936	Franklin D. Roosevelt (D)‡	150,246	69.34%	Alf Landon (R)	64,555	29.79%	William Lemke (U)	1,121	0.52%	4	
1940	Franklin D. Roosevelt (D)‡	154,277	62.25%	Wendell Willkie (R)	93,151	37.59%	Norman Thomas (S)	200	0.08%	4	
1944	Franklin D. Roosevelt (D)‡	150,088	60.44%	Thomas E. Dewey (R)	97,891	39.42%	Norman Thomas (S)	340	0.14%	4	
1948	Harry S. Truman (D) ‡	149,151	53.98%	Thomas E. Dewey (R)	124,402	45.02%	Henry A. Wallace (PR-1948)	2,679	0.97%	4	
1952	Dwight D. Eisenhower (R) ‡	194,190	58.93%	Adlai Stevenson (D)	135,364	41.07%	–	–	–	4	
1956	Dwight D. Eisenhower (R) ‡	215,631	64.56%	Adlai Stevenson (D)	118,364	35.44%	–	–	–	4	
1960	Richard Nixon (R)	205,361	54.81%	John F. Kennedy (D) ‡	169,248	45.17%	Farrell Dobbs (SW)	100	0.03%	4	
1964	Lyndon B. Johnson (D) ‡	219,628	54.71%	Barry Goldwater (R)	180,682	45.01%	–	–	–	4	
1968	Richard Nixon (R) ‡	238,728	56.49%	Hubert Humphrey (D)	156,665	37.07%	George Wallace (AI)	26,906	6.37%	4	
1972	Richard Nixon (R) ‡	323,643	67.64%	George McGovern (D)	126,284	26.39%	John G. Schmitz (AI)	28,549	5.97%	4	
1976	Gerald Ford (R)	337,908	62.44%	Jimmy Carter (D) ‡	182,110	33.65%	Thomas J. Anderson (A)	13,284	2.45%	4	
1980	Ronald Reagan (R) ‡	439,687	72.77%	Jimmy Carter (D)	124,266	20.57%	John B. Anderson (I)	30,284	5.01%	5	
1984	Ronald Reagan (R) ‡	469,105	74.5%	Walter Mondale (D)	155,369	24.68%	David Bergland (LI)	2,447	0.39%	5	
1988	George H. W. Bush (R) ‡	428,442	66.22%	Michael Dukakis (D)	207,343	32.05%	Ron Paul (LI)	7,473	1.16%	5	
1992	George H. W. Bush (R)	322,632	43.36%	Ross Perot (I)	203,400	27.34%	Bill Clinton (D) ‡	183,429	24.65%	5	
1996	Bob Dole (R)	361,911	54.37%	Bill Clinton (D) ‡	221,633	33.3%	Ross Perot (RE)	66,461	9.98%	5	
2000	George W. Bush (R) ‡	515,096	66.83%	Al Gore (D)	203,053	26.34%	Ralph Nader (G)	35,850	4.65%	5	
2004	George W. Bush (R)‡	663,742	71.54%	John Kerry (D)	241,199	26%	Ralph Nader (I)	11,305	1.22%	5	
2008	John McCain (R)	596,030	62.58%	Barack Obama (D)‡	327,670	34.41%	Chuck Baldwin (CP)	12,012	1.26%	5	
2012	Mitt Romney (R)	740,600	72.79%	Barack Obama (D)‡	251,813	24.75%	Gary Johnson (LI)	12,572	1.24%	6	
2016	Donald Trump (R)‡	515,231	45.54%	Hillary Clinton (D)	310,676	27.46%	Evan McMullin (I)	243,690	21.54%	6	
2020	Donald Trump (R)	865,140	58.13%	Joe Biden (D)‡	560,282	37.65%	Jo Jorgensen (LI)	38,447	2.58%	6	
2024	Donald Trump (R)‡	883,818	59.38%	Kamala Harris (D)	562,566	37.79%	Chase Oliver (LI)	16,902	1.14%	6	

=== Graph ===
View source data.

== See also ==
- Elections in Utah
- List of United States presidential election results by state

== Works cited ==
- Guide to U.S. Elections. SAGE Publications. 2010. ISBN 978-1-60426-536-1.
- Presidential elections, 1789–1996. Congressional Quarterly. 1997. ISBN 978-1-56802-065-5. LCCN 97019084. OL 673017M.
