= 1900 United States presidential election in Utah =

- November 6, 1900
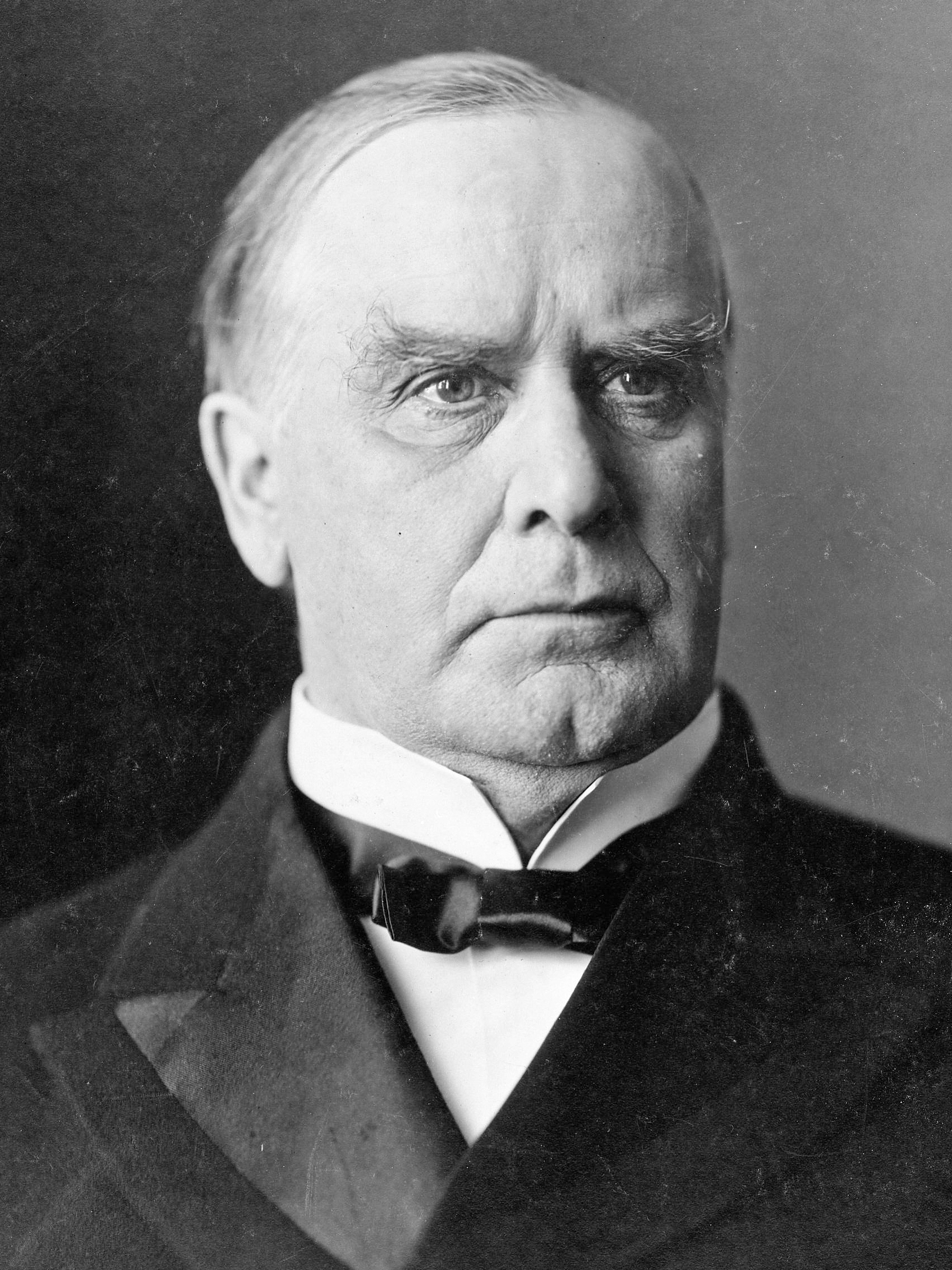

Nominee	William McKinley	William Jennings Bryan
Party	Republican	Democratic
Home state	Ohio	Nebraska
Running mate	Theodore Roosevelt	Adlai E. Stevenson
Electoral vote	3	0
Popular vote	47,139	45,006
Percentage	50.65%	48.36%
County results
McKinley
50–60%
60–70%
70–80%
Bryan
50–60%
70–80%
President before election
William McKinley
Republican
Elected President
William McKinley
Republican

The 1900 United States presidential election in Utah took place on November 6, 1900, as part of the 1900 United States presidential election held in each of the forty-five contemporary states. State voters chose three representatives, or electors to the Electoral College, who voted for president and vice president.

During its years as a territory the Republican Party's ancestral hostility to the polygamy of the Church of Jesus Christ of Latter-day Saints (LDS Church), whose members settled Utah and have dominated the region ever since, meant that Utah territorial politics until 1891 was dominated by the Mormon-hierarchy-controlled "People's Party" and the anti-Mormon "Liberal Party". Those Mormons who did affiliate with national parties generally were Democrats, who lacked moral qualms associated with polygamy and slavery – although the Liberal Party did have allies within the GOP.

In order to achieve statehood, however, the LDS Church disbanded the "People's Party" in 1891 and most LDS members moved towards the Democratic Party. In Utah's statehood year – 1896 – Democrat/Populist William Jennings Bryan, whose "free silver" platform was immensely attractive to a state with large silver reserves, won the Mormon State by a five-to-one margin. However, by Bryan's 1900 rematch with incumbent Republican President McKinley, the Republican Party's ancestral hostility to Mormonism was beginning to dissipate, and Republican National Committee Chairman Mark Hanna was able to persuade the Mormon hierarchy that Bryan's policies – financial and otherwise – were unsound.

Consequently, although the LDS Church had not established the links to the GOP that they were after the Utah legislature elected Reed Smoot, those Utah voters who had supported Bryan overwhelmingly in 1896 deserted him to a degree that narrowly proved sufficient to give the state's three electoral votes to McKinley. Apart from Washington County in the Dixie region, McKinley was competitive everywhere and in Kane County – later a famous Republican bastion – he received over seventy percent. McKinley would win Utah by a narrow margin of 2.29% and this remains easily the closest presidential election in Utah history, and with the state voting essentially as the nation did, it was decisive in placing the Mormon State in the mainstream of US politics, where Utah remained until becoming a Republican bastion in the 1950s and 1960s.

Bryan would later lose Utah again, this time to William Howard Taft in 1908.

== Results ==
General Election Results
Party	Pledged to	Elector	Votes
Republican Party	William McKinley	John R. Murdock	47,139
Republican Party	William McKinley	Wesley K. Walton	47,089
Republican Party	William McKinley	C. Edward Loose	47,071
Democratic Party	William Jennings Bryan	Orlando W. Powers	45,006
Democratic Party	William Jennings Bryan	Alexander H. Tarbet	44,949
Democratic Party	William Jennings Bryan	I. C. Thoresen	44,878
Social Democratic Party	Eugene V. Debs	G. H. Hobbs	720
Social Democratic Party	Eugene V. Debs	Joseph Ward	716
Social Democratic Party	Eugene V. Debs	W. D. Clays	715
Prohibition Party	John G. Woolley	Lulu L. Shepard	209
Prohibition Party	John G. Woolley	George Denton	204
Prohibition Party	John G. Woolley	Richard Wake	204
Socialist Labor Party	Joseph F. Maloney	James P. Erskine	106
Socialist Labor Party	Joseph F. Maloney	E. J. Smith	101
Socialist Labor Party	Joseph F. Maloney	S. R. Wheadon	100
Write-in		Scattering	9
Votes cast (Note: Based on highest elector on each ticket)			93,189

=== Results by county ===
County	William McKinley Republican		William Jennings Bryan Democratic		Eugene V. Debs Socialist		John G. Woolley Prohibition		Joseph F. Malloney Socialist Labor		Margin		Total votes cast
County	#	%	#	%	#	%	#	%	#	%	#	%	Total votes cast
Beaver	682	51.90%	629	47.87%	3	0.23%	0	0.00%	0	0.00%	53	4.03%	1,314
Box Elder	1,635	52.72%	1,460	47.08%	5	0.16%	1	0.03%	0	0.00%	175	5.64%	3,101
Cache	2,820	47.59%	3,082	52.02%	19	0.32%	4	0.07%	0	0.00%	-262	-4.42%	5,925
Carbon	748	54.01%	621	44.84%	10	0.72%	2	0.14%	2	0.14%	127	9.17%	1,385 (Note: Includes 2 Scattering votes)
Davis	1,238	47.02%	1,380	52.41%	8	0.30%	5	0.19%	2	0.08%	-142	-5.39%	2,633
Emery	666	45.34%	798	54.32%	3	0.20%	0	0.00%	0	0.00%	-132	-8.99%	1,469
Garfield	649	62.16%	395	37.84%	0	0.00%	0	0.00%	0	0.00%	254	24.33%	1,044
Grand	178	46.11%	204	52.85%	3	0.78%	1	0.26%	0	0.00%	-26	-6.74%	386
Iron	628	46.94%	708	52.91%	1	0.07%	1	0.07%	0	0.00%	-80	-5.98%	1,338
Juab	1,532	42.46%	1,986	55.04%	83	2.30%	2	0.06%	5	0.14%	-454	-12.58%	3,608
Kane	392	70.89%	161	29.11%	0	0.00%	0	0.00%	0	0.00%	231	41.77%	553
Millard	938	52.55%	844	47.28%	3	0.17%	0	0.00%	0	0.00%	94	5.27%	1,785
Morgan	391	51.72%	363	48.02%	2	0.26%	0	0.00%	0	0.00%	28	3.70%	756
Piute	330	53.75%	280	45.60%	1	0.16%	1	0.16%	2	0.33%	50	8.14%	614
Rich	387	57.76%	282	42.09%	1	0.15%	0	0.00%	0	0.00%	105	15.67%	670
Salt Lake	13,496	50.15%	12,840	47.72%	383	1.42%	110	0.41%	80	0.30%	656	2.44%	26,909
San Juan	81	51.92%	72	46.15%	0	0.00%	3	1.92%	0	0.00%	9	5.77%	156
Sanpete	3,575	59.12%	2,441	40.37%	21	0.35%	7	0.12%	3	0.05%	1,134	18.75%	6,047
Sevier	1,581	54.82%	1,261	43.72%	37	1.28%	2	0.07%	3	0.10%	320	11.10%	2,884
Summit	1,555	46.64%	1,763	52.88%	12	0.36%	2	0.06%	2	0.06%	-208	-6.24%	3,334
Tooele	1,259	52.70%	1,114	46.63%	15	0.63%	1	0.04%	0	0.00%	145	6.07%	2,389
Uintah	639	45.13%	773	54.59%	3	0.21%	1	0.07%	0	0.00%	-134	-9.46%	1,416
Utah	5,698	50.97%	5,391	48.22%	64	0.57%	23	0.21%	3	0.03%	307	2.75%	11,179
Wasatch	723	47.91%	781	51.76%	2	0.13%	2	0.13%	1	0.07%	-58	-3.84%	1,509
Washington	409	28.93%	1,003	70.93%	2	0.14%	0	0.00%	0	0.00%	-594	-42.01%	1,414
Wayne	324	52.94%	282	46.08%	1	0.16%	0	0.00%	0	0.00%	42	6.86%	612 (Note: Includes 5 Scattering votes)
Weber	4,585	52.35%	4,092	46.72%	38	0.43%	41	0.47%	3	0.03%	493	5.63%	8,759
Totals	47,139	50.58%	45,006	48.30%	720	0.77%	209	0.22%	106	0.11%	2,133	2.29%	93,189

==== Counties that flipped from Democratic to Republican ====
- Beaver
- Box Elder
- Carbon
- Garfield
- Millard
- Morgan
- Piute
- Rich
- Salt Lake
- San Juan
- Sanpete
- Sevier
- Tooele
- Utah
- Wayne
- Weber

== See also ==
- United States presidential elections in Utah
