= 1916 United States presidential election in Utah =

- November 7, 1916

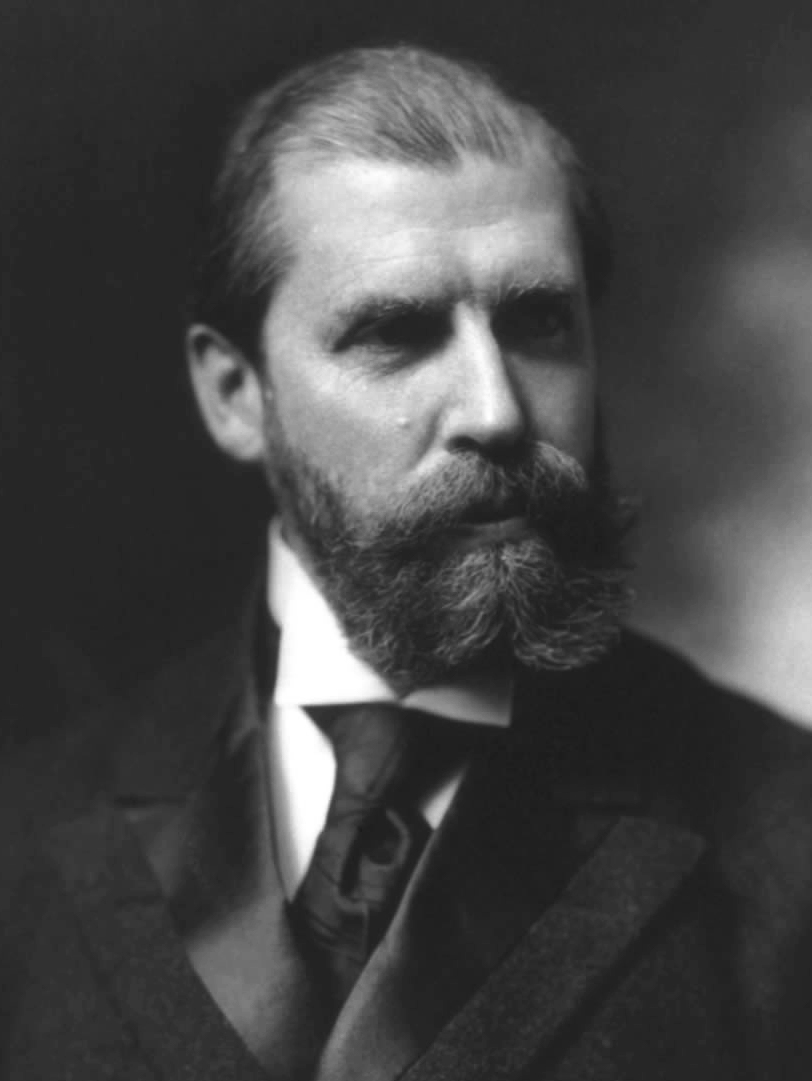
Nominee	Woodrow Wilson	Charles Evans Hughes
Party	Democratic	Republican
Alliance	Progressive
Home state	New Jersey	New York
Running mate	Thomas R. Marshall	Charles W. Fairbanks
Electoral vote	4	0
Popular vote	84,256	54,137
Percentage	58.86%	37.82%
County results
Wilson
50–60%
60–70%
President before election
Woodrow Wilson
Democratic
Elected President
Woodrow Wilson
Democratic

The 1916 United States presidential election in Utah took place on November 7, 1916. All contemporary forty-eight states were part of the 1916 United States presidential election. State voters chose four electors to the Electoral College, who voted for president and vice president. This was the first election featuring as a distinct voting unit Duchesne County, which had been split from Wasatch County in 1915.

In the preceding 1912 presidential election, Utah had been one of only two states (the other being strongly Republican Vermont) to give a plurality to incumbent President William Howard Taft. However, in contrast to the East where supporters of Theodore Roosevelt's "Bull Moose" Party rapidly returned to the Republicans, in the Mountain States many if not most of these supporters turned to the Democratic Party not only in presidential elections, but also in state and federal legislative ones. Another factor helping Wilson was a powerful "peace vote" in the Western states due to opposition to participation in World War I, and a third was that a considerable part of the substantial vote for Socialist candidate Eugene Debs from the previous election was turned over to Wilson owing to such progressive reforms as the Sixteenth and Seventeenth Amendments. A fourth factor was that Taft had support from the Mormon hierarchy that commanded the loyalty of most of Utah's population – which caused Utah to remain largely loyal to him amidst the GOP split – but the LDS Church did not maintain support with Hughes.

The combined result was that Wilson was able to make Utah his second-strongest victory outside of the "Solid South" – in a state that four years previously had given him his seventh-lowest popular vote proportion. Utah was his eleventh-best state overall and voted 17.83 percentage points more Democratic than the nation at-large. Wilson swept every county in the state, including rock-ribbed Republican Kane County, which had been Taft's third-strongest county nationwide in 1912, which has never otherwise supported a Democrat for president, and where otherwise only William Jennings Bryan in 1896 and Franklin D. Roosevelt in 1936 have as Democrats received so much as one-third of the vote. This is the only time a Democrat swept every county in the state.

== Results ==
General Election Results (Note: The Progressive Party had a separate ballot line in Utah in 1916 but its nominees were the Democratic nominees for all offices.)
Party	Pledged to	Elector	Votes
Democratic Party	Woodrow Wilson	Jesse Knight	84,145
Democratic Party	Woodrow Wilson	Robert N. Baskin	84,025
Democratic Party	Woodrow Wilson	Anthon Anderson	83,962
Democratic Party	Woodrow Wilson	John Seaman	83,872
Republican Party	Charles Evans Hughes	Orange Seely	54,137
Republican Party	Charles Evans Hughes	Asa R. Hawley	54,136
Republican Party	Charles Evans Hughes	Thomas Smart	54,089
Republican Party	Charles Evans Hughes	David Jenson	53,993
Socialist Party	Allan L. Benson	Charles E. Robinson	4,460
Socialist Party	Allan L. Benson	Albert V. Wallis	4,458
Socialist Party	Allan L. Benson	Francis J. Mallet	4,454
Socialist Party	Allan L. Benson	Morton Alexander	4,451
Prohibition Party	Frank Hanly	Rachel E. Waite	149
Prohibition Party	Frank Hanly	James H. Worrall	147
Prohibition Party	Frank Hanly	Louis Page	145
Socialist Labor Party	Arthur E. Reimer	Eugene A. Battell	144
Socialist Labor Party	Arthur E. Reimer	James P. Erskine	143
Socialist Labor Party	Arthur E. Reimer	Howard Hall	143
Socialist Labor Party	Arthur E. Reimer	Theodore Petersen	142
Progressive Party	Woodrow Wilson	Jesse Knight	111
Progressive Party	Woodrow Wilson	Anthon Anderson	111
Progressive Party	Woodrow Wilson	John Seaman	111
Progressive Party	Woodrow Wilson	Robert N. Baskin	110
Votes cast (Note: Based on highest elector on each ticket)			143,146

=== Results by county ===
County	Woodrow Wilson Democratic		Charles Evans Hughes Republican		Allan L. Benson Socialist		Frank Hanly Prohibition		Arthur E. Reimer Socialist Labor		Margin		Total votes cast
County	#	%	#	%	#	%	#	%	#	%	#	%	Total votes cast
Beaver	1,291	58.84%	842	38.38%	61	2.78%	0	0.00%	0	0.00%	449	20.46%	2,194
Box Elder	2,958 (Note: Includes 1 vote on the Progressive ticket)	54.70%	2,416	44.67%	34	0.63%	0	0.00%	0	0.00%	542	10.02%	5,408
Cache	5,305	58.03%	3,756	41.09%	75	0.82%	2	0.02%	4	0.04%	1,549	16.94%	9,142
Carbon	1,478	50.43%	1,301	44.39%	147	5.02%	4	0.14%	1	0.03%	177	6.04%	2,931
Davis	2,134 (Note: Includes 3 votes on the Progressive ticket)	56.16%	1,641	43.18%	22	0.58%	2	0.05%	1	0.03%	493	12.97%	3,800
Duchesne	1,443	56.61%	687	26.95%	410	16.08%	0	0.00%	9	0.35%	756	29.66%	2,549
Emery	1,407	58.72%	896	37.40%	88	3.67%	0	0.00%	5	0.21%	511	21.33%	2,396
Garfield	843	61.26%	516	37.50%	16	1.16%	1	0.07%	0	0.00%	327	23.76%	1,376
Grand	306	56.77%	213	39.52%	19	3.53%	0	0.00%	1	0.19%	93	17.25%	539
Iron	1,156	56.09%	825	40.03%	76	3.69%	0	0.00%	4	0.19%	331	16.06%	2,061
Juab	2,221	61.30%	1,248	34.45%	151	4.17%	0	0.00%	3	0.08%	973	26.86%	3,623
Kane	329	50.85%	304	46.99%	14	2.16%	0	0.00%	0	0.00%	25	3.86%	647
Millard	1,804	56.23%	1,293	40.31%	94	2.93%	6	0.19%	11	0.34%	511	15.93%	3,208
Morgan	484	50.63%	464	48.54%	8	0.84%	0	0.00%	0	0.00%	20	2.09%	956
Piute	417	56.20%	269	36.25%	55	7.41%	0	0.00%	1	0.13%	148	19.95%	742
Rich	454	58.28%	325	41.72%	0	0.00%	0	0.00%	0	0.00%	129	16.56%	779
Salt Lake	30,707	61.18%	17,593	35.05%	1,778	3.54%	70	0.14%	41	0.08%	13,114	26.13%	50,189
San Juan	448	66.27%	213	31.51%	15	2.22%	0	0.00%	0	0.00%	235	34.76%	676
Sanpete	3,457 (Note: Includes 75 votes on the Progressive ticket)	53.50%	2,918	45.16%	78	1.21%	1	0.02%	8	0.12%	539	8.34%	6,462
Sevier	2,052	53.44%	1,720	44.79%	67	1.74%	0	0.00%	1	0.03%	332	8.65%	3,840
Summit	1,498	51.00%	1,195	40.69%	240	8.17%	1	0.03%	3	0.10%	303	10.32%	2,937
Tooele	1,528	55.20%	1,124	40.61%	113	4.08%	1	0.04%	2	0.07%	404	14.60%	2,768
Uintah	1,465 (Note: Includes 6 votes on the Progressive ticket)	64.37%	712	31.28%	94	4.13%	4	0.18%	1	0.04%	753	33.08%	2,276
Utah	8,248 (Note: Includes 13 votes on the Progressive ticket)	59.39%	5,201	37.45%	410	2.95%	11	0.08%	17	0.12%	3,047	21.94%	13,887
Wasatch	885	51.57%	817	47.61%	14	0.82%	0	0.00%	0	0.00%	68	3.96%	1,716
Washington	1,397	66.40%	703	33.41%	4	0.19%	0	0.00%	0	0.00%	694	32.98%	2,104
Wayne	393	62.68%	225	35.89%	9	1.44%	0	0.00%	0	0.00%	168	26.79%	627
Weber	8,148 (Note: Includes 9 votes on the Progressive ticket)	61.20%	4,720	35.45%	368	2.76%	46	0.35%	31	0.23%	3,428	25.75%	13,313
Total	84,256	58.86%	54,137	37.82%	4,460	3.12%	149	0.10%	144	0.10%	30,119	21.04%	143,146

==== Counties that flipped from Republican to Democratic ====
- Beaver
- Box Elder
- Carbon
- Davis
- Emery
- Garfield
- Iron
- Juab
- Kane
- Millard
- Morgan
- Piute
- Rich
- Salt Lake
- San Juan
- Sanpete
- Sevier
- Summit
- Tooele
- Wasatch
- Wayne

==== Counties that flipped from Progressive to Democratic ====
- Uintah
- Weber

== See also ==
- United States presidential elections in Utah
