= 1964 United States presidential election in Utah =

- November 3, 1964

Nominee	Lyndon B. Johnson	Barry Goldwater
Party	Democratic	Republican
Home state	Texas	Arizona
Running mate	Hubert Humphrey	William E. Miller
Electoral vote	4	0
Popular vote	219,628	181,785 (Note: The commonly cited total for Goldwater is 180,682 but this was a mistake caused by accidentally excluding Goldwater's votes in Emery County. On the original handwritten abstract, this erroneous total is scratched out and corrected to 181,785.)
Percentage	54.71%	45.29%
County results
Johnson
50–60%
60–70%
70–80%
Goldwater
50–60%
60–70%
President before election
Lyndon B. Johnson
Democratic
Elected President
Lyndon B. Johnson
Democratic

The 1964 United States presidential election in Utah took place on November 3, 1964, as part of the 1964 United States presidential election. State voters chose four representatives, or electors, to the Electoral College, who voted for president and vice president.

Utah was won by incumbent President Lyndon B. Johnson (D–Texas), with 54.71 percent of the popular vote, against Senator Barry Goldwater (R–Arizona), with 45.29 percent of the popular vote.

As of the 2024 presidential election, this is the only presidential race since 1948 where Utah voted Democrat, and the last time a Democratic presidential candidate has exceeded 40% of the state's vote. It also marks the most recent time that Utah, Weber, Wasatch, Duchesne, Juab, Morgan, Beaver, Wayne, and Daggett Counties have voted Democratic, as well as the last time Democrats carried any congressional district in the state.

== Results ==
1964 United States presidential election in Utah
Party	Candidate	Votes	%
Democratic	Lyndon B. Johnson (inc.)	219,628	54.71%
Republican	Barry Goldwater	181,785	45.29%
Total votes		401,413	100.00%

=== Results by county ===
County	Lyndon B. Johnson Democratic		Barry Goldwater Republican		Margin		Total votes cast
County	#	%	#	%	#	%	Total votes cast
Beaver	1,189	60.02%	792	39.98%	397	20.04%	1,981
Box Elder	5,113	42.74%	6,851	57.26%	−1,738	−14.52%	11,964
Cache	6,627	41.54%	9,326	58.46%	−2,699	−16.92%	15,953
Carbon	5,672	72.70%	2,130	27.30%	3,542	45.40%	7,802
Daggett	170	60.28%	112	39.72%	58	20.56%	282
Davis	14,177	49.48%	14,477	50.52%	−300	−1.04%	28,654
Duchesne	1,320	51.34%	1,251	48.66%	69	2.68%	2,571
Emery	1,434	56.52%	1,103	43.48%	331	13.04%	2,537
Garfield	658	44.49%	821	55.51%	−163	−11.02%	1,479
Grand	1,145	50.33%	1,130	49.67%	15	0.66%	2,275
Iron	2,053	44.87%	2,522	55.13%	−469	−10.26%	4,575
Juab	1,319	58.75%	926	41.25%	393	17.50%	2,245
Kane	340	30.25%	784	69.75%	−444	−39.50%	1,124
Millard	1,462	42.56%	1,973	57.44%	−511	−14.88%	3,435
Morgan	835	59.35%	572	40.65%	263	18.70%	1,407
Piute	273	43.06%	361	56.94%	−88	−13.88%	634
Rich	326	42.84%	435	57.16%	−109	−14.32%	761
Salt Lake	103,926	57.09%	78,118	42.91%	25,808	14.18%	182,044
San Juan	993	42.01%	1,371	57.99%	−378	−15.98%	2,364
Sanpete	2,547	49.29%	2,620	50.71%	−73	−1.42%	5,167
Sevier	1,948	42.67%	2,617	57.33%	−669	−14.66%	4,565
Summit	1,497	52.86%	1,335	47.14%	162	5.72%	2,832
Tooele	5,239	67.60%	2,511	32.40%	2,728	35.20%	7,750
Uintah	2,142	46.78%	2,437	53.22%	−295	−6.44%	4,579
Utah	23,936	53.37%	20,912	46.63%	3,024	6.74%	44,848
Wasatch	1,420	55.08%	1,158	44.92%	262	10.16%	2,578
Washington	1,789	41.38%	2,534	58.62%	−745	−17.24%	4,323
Wayne	412	50.74%	400	49.26%	12	1.48%	812
Weber	29,666	59.48%	20,206	40.52%	9,460	18.96%	49,872
Totals	219,628	54.71%	181,785	45.29%	37,843	9.43%	401,413

==== Counties that flipped from Republican to Democratic ====
- Duchesne
- Emery
- Grand
- Juab
- Morgan
- Salt Lake
- Summit
- Utah
- Wayne
- Wasatch

== See also ==
- United States presidential elections in Utah
