= 1960 United States presidential election in Utah =

- November 8, 1960

Nominee	Richard Nixon	John F. Kennedy
Party	Republican	Democratic
Home state	California	Massachusetts
Running mate	Henry Cabot Lodge Jr.	Lyndon B. Johnson
Electoral vote	4	0
Popular vote	205,361	169,248
Percentage	54.81%	45.17%
County results
Nixon
50–60%
60–70%
80–90%
Kennedy
50–60%
60–70%
President before election
Dwight D. Eisenhower
Republican
Elected President
John F. Kennedy
Democratic

The 1960 United States presidential election in Utah took place on November 8, 1960, as part of the 1960 United States presidential election. State voters chose four representatives, or electors, to the Electoral College, who voted for president and vice president.

Utah was won by incumbent Vice President Richard Nixon (R–California), running with United States Ambassador to the United Nations Henry Cabot Lodge Jr., with 54.81 percent of the popular vote, against Senator John F. Kennedy (D–Massachusetts), running with Senator Lyndon B. Johnson, with 45.17 percent of the popular vote. This was the first election since 1912 where Utah voted for the losing candidate.

== Results ==
1960 United States presidential election in Utah
Party	Candidate	Votes	%
Republican	Richard Nixon	205,361	54.81%
Democratic	John F. Kennedy	169,248	45.17%
Socialist Workers	Farrell Dobbs	100	0.03%
Total votes		374,709	100.00%

=== Results by county ===
County	Richard Nixon Republican		John F. Kennedy Democratic		Farrell Dobbs Socialist Workers		Margin		Total votes cast
County	#	%	#	%	#	%	#	%	Total votes cast
Beaver	971	45.65%	1,156	54.35%	0	0.00%	-185	-8.70%	2,127
Box Elder	6,594	63.23%	3,831	36.74%	3	0.03%	2,763	26.49%	10,428
Cache	10,281	67.65%	4,917	32.35%	0	0.00%	5,364	35.30%	15,198
Carbon	2,953	32.79%	6,039	67.06%	14	0.16%	-3,086	-34.27%	9,006
Daggett	196	44.95%	239	54.82%	1	0.23%	-43	-9.87%	436
Davis	13,782	57.34%	10,244	42.62%	8	0.03%	3,538	14.72%	24,034
Duchesne	1,546	56.98%	1,166	42.98%	1	0.04%	380	14.00%	2,713
Emery	1,283	50.89%	1,238	49.11%	0	0.00%	45	1.78%	2,521
Garfield	1,083	69.69%	471	30.31%	0	0.00%	612	39.38%	1,554
Grand	1,130	58.40%	805	41.60%	0	0.00%	325	16.80%	1,935
Iron	3,079	63.91%	1,738	36.07%	1	0.02%	1,341	27.84%	4,818
Juab	1,202 (Note: The printed abstract contains a typo in this county. The correct value is 1,202 and can be found on both the original handwritten state abstract and the county return which gives the votes by precincts. Both of those documents are located at the state archives in Salt Lake City. Scammon's compilation also has the correct figure of 1,202.)	50.95%	1,158	49.05%	0	0.00%	44	1.90%	2,360
Kane	876	80.44%	213	19.56%	0	0.00%	663	60.88%	1,089
Millard	2,248	61.15%	1,425	38.76%	3	0.08%	823	22.39%	3,676
Morgan	775	55.44%	622	44.49%	1	0.07%	153	10.95%	1,398
Piute	453	64.71%	247	35.29%	0	0.00%	206	29.42%	700
Rich	511	63.72%	291	36.28%	0	0.00%	220	27.44%	802
Salt Lake	90,845	54.49%	75,868	45.51%	0	0.00%	14,977	8.98%	166,713
San Juan	1,408	62.72%	837	37.28%	0	0.00%	571	25.44%	2,245
Sanpete	3,322	60.35%	2,180	39.60%	3	0.05%	1,142	20.75%	5,505
Sevier	3,166	65.18%	1,690	34.80%	1	0.02%	1,476	30.38%	4,857
Summit	1,607	56.91%	1,217	43.09%	0	0.00%	390	13.82%	2,824
Tooele	3,016	45.10%	3,665	54.80%	7	0.10%	-649	-9.70%	6,688
Uintah	2,882	67.62%	1,380	32.38%	0	0.00%	1,502	35.24%	4,262
Utah	23,057	53.99%	19,626	45.95%	25	0.06%	3,431	8.04%	42,708
Wasatch	1,480	58.11%	1,066	41.85%	1	0.04%	414	16.26%	2,547
Washington	2,876	68.90%	1,298	31.10%	0	0.00%	1,578	37.80%	4,174
Wayne	446	53.86%	382	46.14%	0	0.00%	64	7.72%	828
Weber	22,293	47.88%	24,239	52.06%	31	0.07%	-1,946	-4.18%	46,563
Totals	205,361	54.81%	169,248	45.17%	100	0.03%	36,113	9.64%	374,709

==== Counties that flipped from Republican to Democratic ====
- Beaver
- Daggett
- Carbon
- Tooele
- Weber

== See also ==
- United States presidential elections in Utah
