= 1948 United States presidential election in Utah =

- November 2, 1948

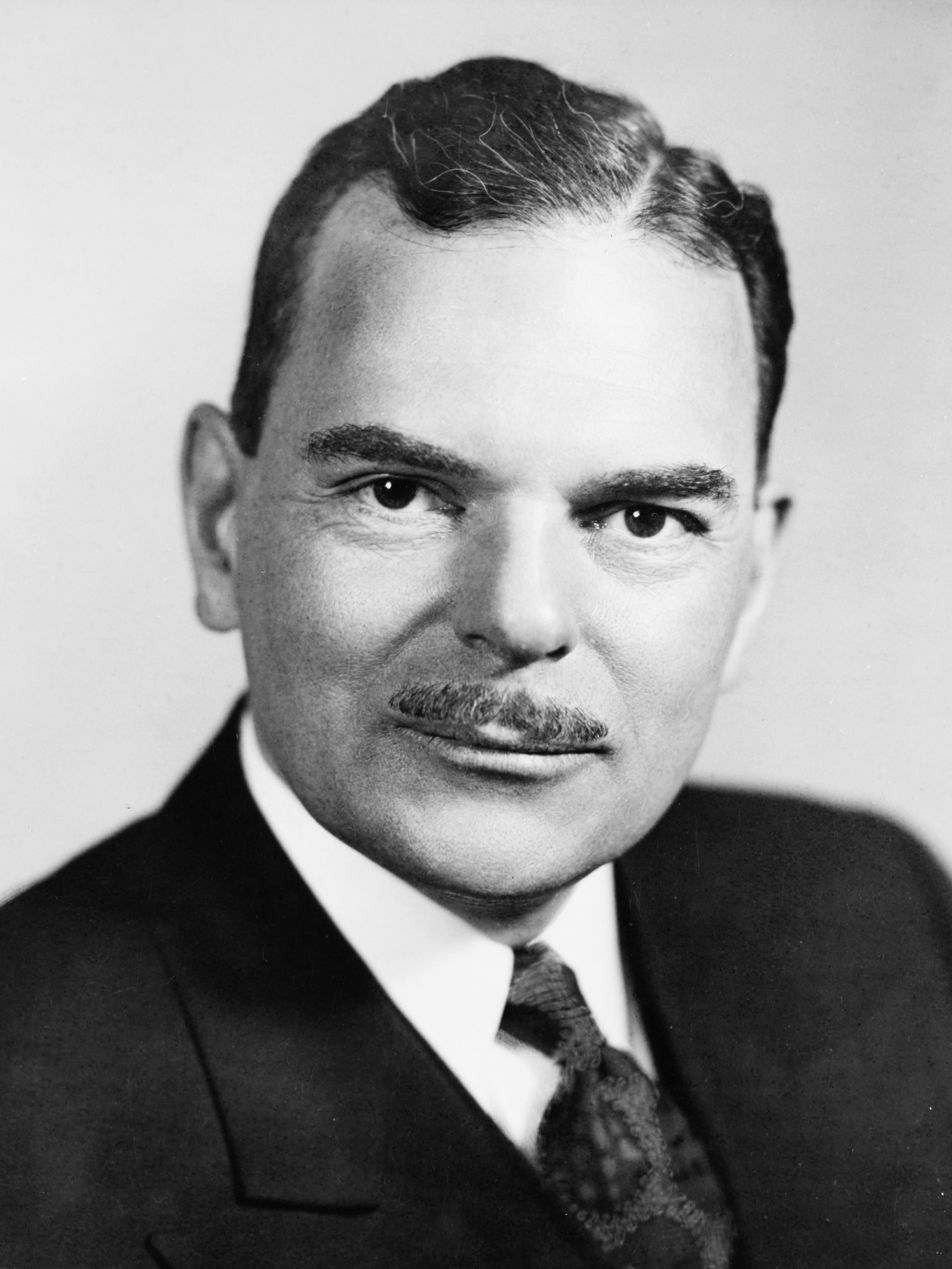
Nominee	Harry S. Truman	Thomas E. Dewey
Party	Democratic	Republican
Home state	Missouri	New York
Running mate	Alben W. Barkley	Earl Warren
Electoral vote	4	0
Popular vote	149,151	124,402
Percentage	53.98%	45.02%
County results
Truman
50–60%
60–70%
Dewey
50–60%
70–80%
President before election
Harry S. Truman
Democratic
Elected President
Harry S. Truman
Democratic

The 1948 United States presidential election in Utah was held on November 2, 1948, as part of the 1948 United States presidential election. State voters chose four electors to the Electoral College, who voted for president and vice president.

Utah was won by Democratic Party candidate Harry S. Truman, who carried the state with 53.98 percent of the popular vote and winning its four electoral votes. As of the 2024 presidential election, this is the last election in which Davis County and Uintah County voted for a Democratic presidential candidate.

This was the last election in which Utah voted more Democratic than the nation. After 1948, the state would shift strongly toward the Republican Party, only backing the Democratic presidential nominee once more, during Lyndon B. Johnson's 1964 landslide, and in many election cycles afterward being the most Republican state in the nation. As of 2024 this is also the last time that Utah voted more Democratic than Illinois.

This was the first election in which Utah utilized the short ballot for presidential electors rather than voting for electors directly.

== Results ==
1948 United States presidential election in Utah
Party	Candidate	Votes	%
Democratic	Harry S. Truman (inc.)	149,151	53.98%
Republican	Thomas E. Dewey	124,402	45.02%
Progressive	Henry A. Wallace	2,679	0.97%
Socialist Workers	Farrell Dobbs	73	0.03%
Total votes		276,305	100.00%

=== Results by county ===
County	Harry S. Truman Democratic		Thomas E. Dewey Republican		Henry A. Wallace Progressive		Farrell Dobbs Socialist Workers		Margin		Total votes cast
County	#	%	#	%	#	%	#	%	#	%	Total votes cast
Beaver	1,190	52.56%	1,057	46.69%	17	0.75%	0	0.00%	133	5.87%	2,264
Box Elder	3,667	49.06%	3,790	50.70%	18	0.24%	0	0.00%	-123	-1.65%	7,475
Cache	6,383	49.30%	6,514	50.32%	46	0.36%	3	0.02%	-131	-1.01%	12,946
Carbon	6,397	68.34%	2,704	28.89%	254	2.71%	5	0.05%	3,693	39.46%	9,360
Daggett	95	57.58%	69	41.82%	1	0.61%	0	0.00%	26	15.76%	165
Davis	6,147	56.21%	4,718	43.14%	71	0.65%	0	0.00%	1,429	13.07%	10,936
Duchesne	1,588	55.33%	1,266	44.11%	16	0.56%	0	0.00%	322	11.22%	2,870
Emery	1,511	56.53%	1,147	42.91%	14	0.52%	1	0.04%	364	13.62%	2,673
Garfield	642	40.97%	924	58.97%	1	0.06%	0	0.00%	-282	-18.00%	1,567
Grand	400	48.37%	418	50.54%	9	1.09%	0	0.00%	-18	-2.18%	827
Iron	1,596	40.81%	2,289	58.53%	24	0.61%	2	0.05%	-693	-17.72%	3,911
Juab	1,501	51.55%	1,396	47.94%	13	0.45%	2	0.07%	105	3.61%	2,912
Kane	220	22.24%	769	77.76%	0	0.00%	0	0.00%	-549	-55.51%	989
Millard	1,817	45.10%	2,184	54.21%	26	0.65%	2	0.05%	-367	-9.11%	4,029
Morgan	670	52.96%	587	46.40%	7	0.55%	1	0.08%	83	6.56%	1,265
Piute	315	41.28%	440	57.67%	8	1.05%	0	0.00%	-125	-16.38%	763
Rich	366	47.78%	399	52.09%	1	0.13%	0	0.00%	-33	-4.31%	766
Salt Lake	62,957	53.85%	52,479	44.89%	1,453	1.24%	28	0.02%	10,478	8.96%	116,917
San Juan	418	42.52%	558	56.77%	5	0.51%	2	0.20%	-140	-14.24%	983
Sanpete	3,041	47.43%	3,336	52.03%	32	0.50%	3 (Note: The printed statewide abstract, which is cited by Scammon, Leip, et al. contains a typo for Dobbs in this county. The correct figure is 3 and can be found on both the original handwritten state abstract and the county return which contains the results by precinct. Both of those documents are located at the state archives in Salt Lake City.)	0.05%	-295	-4.60%	6,412
Sevier	1,943	40.91%	2,791	58.76%	15	0.32%	1	0.02%	-848	-17.85%	4,750
Summit	1,556	48.53%	1,617	50.44%	33	1.03%	0	0.00%	-61	-1.90%	3,206
Tooele	2,798	57.29%	2,036	41.69%	48	0.98%	2	0.04%	762	15.60%	4,884
Uintah	1,622	51.44%	1,513	47.99%	17	0.54%	1	0.03%	109	3.46%	3,153
Utah	16,191	54.18%	13,395	44.82%	296	0.99%	4	0.01%	2,796	9.36%	29,886
Wasatch	1,219	51.03%	1,165	48.77%	5	0.21%	0	0.00%	54	2.26%	2,389
Washington	1,580	43.68%	2,029	56.10%	6	0.17%	2	0.06%	-449	-12.41%	3,617
Wayne	460	55.35%	367	44.16%	4	0.48%	0	0.00%	93	11.19%	831
Weber	20,861	62.16%	12,445	37.08%	239	0.71%	14	0.04%	8,416	25.08%	33,559
Totals	149,151	53.98%	124,402	45.02%	2,679	0.97%	73	0.03%	24,749	8.96%	276,305

==== Counties that flipped from Democratic to Republican ====
- Box Elder
- Cache
- Millard
- Rich
- Summit
- Washington

== See also ==
- United States presidential elections in Utah
