= Douglas Bischoff =

American politician

Douglas G. Bischoff (1926 – May 12, 1991) was a professional optometrist, Republican politician and party worker in Utah. He served as Deputy Chief of Staff to Utah Governor Norman H. Bangerter, after serving as a state senator. He was a leader in the Utah Republican Party, serving as Republican Party Chairman and chairing Ronald Reagan's presidential campaigns in the state. He was elected to the Utah State Senate three times between 1969 and 1976.

== Personal life ==
Bischoff received his bachelor's degree from the University of Utah. He later received his Doctor of Optometry from Columbia University.

Bischoff was a member of the Church of Jesus Christ of Latter-day Saints (LDS Church), where he served as a member of the high council in the Mt. Olympus North Stake. He served as an LDS missionary in West Germany. He was the president of the Switzerland Zurich Mission from 1980 to 1983.

Bischoff and his wife, Cohleen Jensen, are the parents of two children.
