= 1896 United States presidential election in Utah =

- November 3, 1896

Nominee	William Jennings Bryan	William McKinley
Party	Democratic	Republican
Alliance	Populist	-
Home state	Nebraska	Ohio
Running mate	Arthur Sewall (Democratic) (Note: Two of the three electors voted for Arthur Sewall of Maine as Vice-President.); Thomas E. Watson (Populist) (Note: One of the three electors voted for Thomas E. Watson of Georgia as Vice-President.)	Garret Hobart
Electoral vote	3	0
Popular vote	64,607	13,491
Percentage	82.70%	17.27%
County results
Bryan
60–70%
70–80%
80–90%
90–100%
McKinley
50–60%
President before election
Grover Cleveland
Democratic
Elected President
William McKinley
Republican

The 1896 United States presidential election in Utah was held on November 3, 1896, as part of the 1896 United States presidential election. Voters chose three representatives, or electors to the Electoral College, who voted for president and vice president. This was the first time Utah participated in a presidential election, having been admitted as the 45th state on January 4 of that year.

Democrat William Jennings Bryan carried Utah by a margin of 65.43% over Republican William McKinley—the strongest ever performance by any presidential nominee in the state—despite narrowly losing the national election. As such, this is the only time a Republican has won the presidency without winning Utah, starkly contrasting with the state's subsequent status as one of the most staunchly Republican states in the nation.

Utah had been established as a territory within five years of the earliest settlement by the Church of Jesus Christ of Latter-Day Saints, but opposition by the Republican Party – dominant from 1860 – to Mormon polygamy meant that Utah was consistently refused statehood. Consequently, Utah territorial politics until 1891 was dominated by the Mormon-hierarchy-controlled "People's Party" and the anti-Mormon "Liberal Party". Those Mormons who did affiliate with national parties generally were Democrats, who lacked moral qualms associated with polygamy and slavery – although the Liberal Party did have allies within the GOP. In order to achieve statehood, however, the LDS Church disbanded the "People's Party" in 1891 and most LDS members moved towards the Democratic Party.

The 1896 election in Utah was dominated by the influence of silver mine owners, who overwhelmingly supported Democrat/Populist William Jennings Bryan because he advocated coinage of free silver at a ratio of 16-to-1 with gold. As a consequence, Utah voted overwhelmingly for Bryan, who won the state by 65.43 percentage points, in what remains by far the strongest-ever performance by any presidential nominee in the state. Even with Republicans overwhelmingly dominating Utah politics since the 1960s, this margin has not been approached by any party or candidate since. Bryan carried every county except Kane in the far south – where his margin of defeat remains the second-best ever by a Democrat, behind Woodrow Wilson's narrow 1916 victory – with greater than sixty-five percent of the vote, and exceeded seventy percent in all but one.

With 82.7% of the popular vote, Utah would prove to be Bryan's fourth strongest state in the 1896 presidential election after Mississippi, South Carolina and Colorado.

Bryan would later lose Utah to William McKinley four years later and would lose the state again to Republican William Howard Taft in 1908. Bryan's support for many Populist goals resulted in him being nominated by both the Democratic Party and the People's Party (Populists), though with different running mates. One electoral vote from Utah was cast for the Populist Bryan-Watson ticket with Thomas E. Watson as vice-president and two votes were cast for the Bryan-Sewall ticket.

== Results ==
General Election Results
Party	Pledged to	Elector	Votes
Fusion (Note: Democratic, People's, and Independent Republican)	William Jennings Bryan	Henry W. Lawrence	64,607
Fusion	William Jennings Bryan	Robert C. Lund	64,522
Fusion (Note: Democratic & Independent Republican but not People's)	William Jennings Bryan	John J. Daly	64,173
Republican Party	William McKinley	Charles W. Bennett	13,491
Republican Party	William McKinley	Joseph A. Smith	13,369
Republican Party	William McKinley	J. D. Page	13,484
Write-in		Scattering	21 (Note: Some sources assign these votes to Palmer, but there is no evidence on the original documents at the state archives that these votes were intended for National Democratic electors. All of these votes were recorded in Salt Lake County; both the statewide and county canvass sheets simply list these votes as "Scattering" rather than for specific candidates whose names were written in.)
Votes cast (Note: Based on highest elector on each ticket)			78,119

=== Results by county ===
County	William Jennings Bryan Fusion		William McKinley Republican		Margin		Total votes cast
County	#	%	#	%	#	%	Total votes cast
Beaver	1,057	83.76%	205	16.24%	852	67.51%	1,262
Box Elder	1,879	71.88%	735	28.12%	1,144	43.76%	2,614
Cache	4,395	83.97%	839	16.03%	3,556	67.94%	5,234
Carbon	663	88.64%	85	11.36%	578	77.27%	748
Davis	1,753	79.57%	450	20.43%	1,303	59.15%	2,203
Emery	985	81.00%	231	19.00%	754	62.01%	1,216
Garfield	615	71.18%	249	28.82%	366	42.36%	864
Grand	264	90.41%	28	9.59%	236	80.82%	292
Iron	806	79.72%	205	20.28%	601	59.45%	1,011
Juab	2,360	84.32%	439	15.67%	1,921	68.63%	2,799
Kane	230	44.40%	288	55.60%	-58	-11.20%	518
Millard	1,384	89.29%	166	10.71%	1,218	78.58%	1,550
Morgan	582	80.83%	138	19.17%	444	61.67%	720
Piute	555	94.23%	34	5.77%	521	88.46%	589
Rich	408	71.58%	162	28.42%	246	43.16%	570
Salt Lake	18,617	87.75%	2,577	12.15%	16,040	75.61%	21,215 (Note: Includes 21 Scattering votes)
San Juan	167	95.43%	8	4.57%	159	90.86%	175
Sanpete	3,387	65.13%	1,813	34.87%	1,574	30.27%	5,200
Sevier	1,858	78.90%	497	21.10%	1,361	57.79%	2,355
Summit	3,402	93.28%	245	6.72%	3,157	86.56%	3,647
Tooele	1,684	86.01%	274	13.99%	1,410	72.01%	1,958
Uintah	890	88.82%	112	11.18%	778	77.64%	1,002
Utah	7,375	78.34%	2,039	21.66%	5,336	56.68%	9,414
Wasatch	1,333	96.32%	51	3.68%	1,282	92.63%	1,384
Washington	1,210	87.68%	170	12.32%	1,040	75.36%	1,380
Wayne	405	83.85%	78	16.15%	327	67.70%	483
Weber	6,343	82.21%	1,373	17.79%	4,970	64.41%	7,716
Totals	64,607	82.70%	13,491	17.27%	51,116	65.43%	78,119

== See also ==
- United States presidential elections in Utah
