= List of ghost towns in Utah =

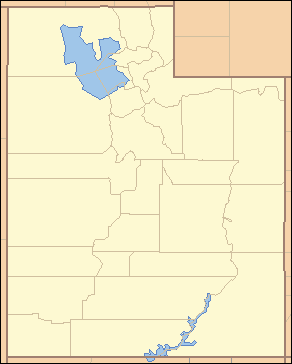
A state map of Utah with each of the counties labeled

This is an incomplete list of ghost towns in Utah, a state of the United States.

== Classification ==
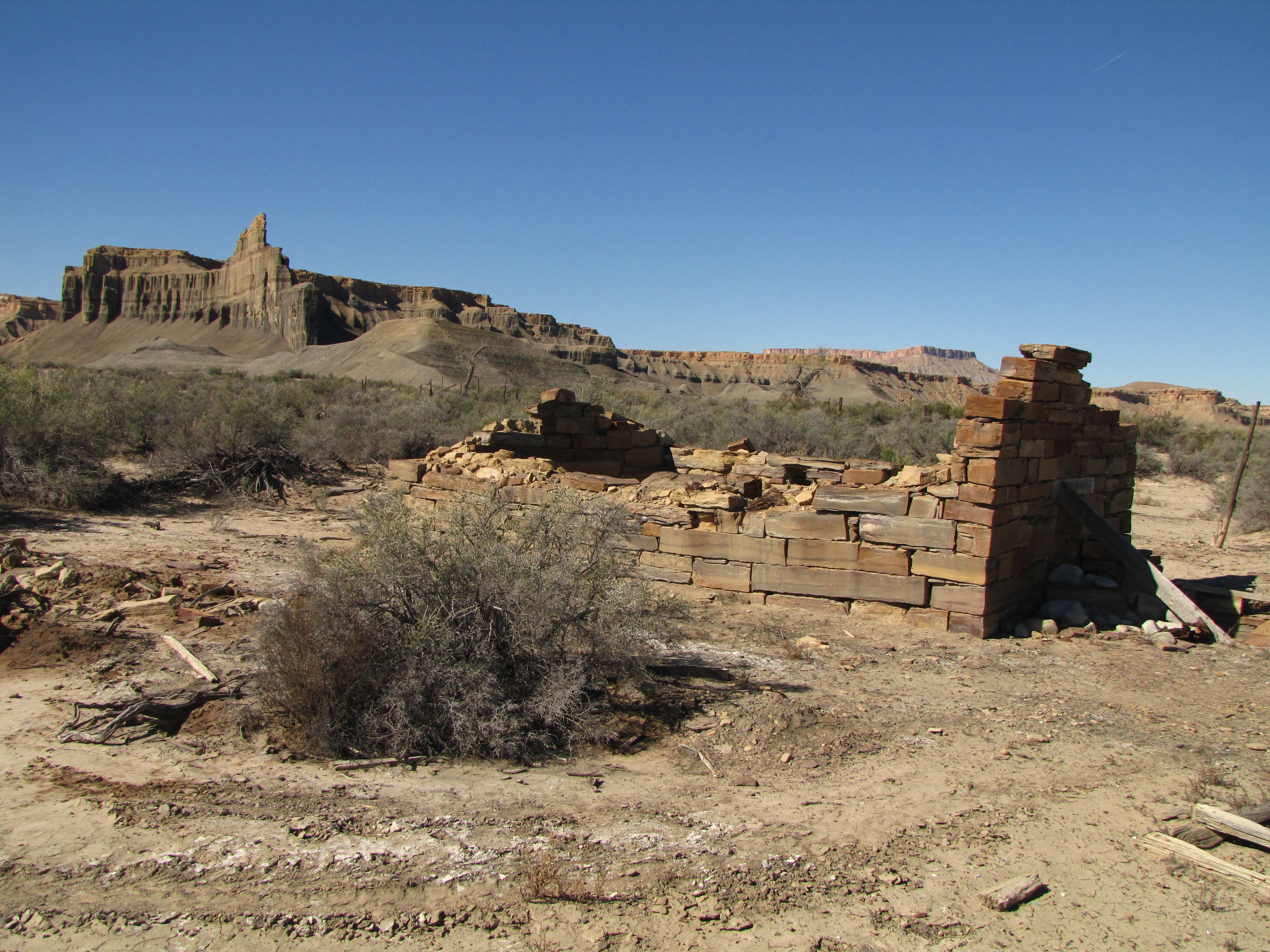
Foundation left in Giles

=== Barren site ===
- Sites no longer in existence
- Sites that have been destroyed
- Covered with water
- Reverted to pasture
- May have a few difficult to find foundations/footings at most

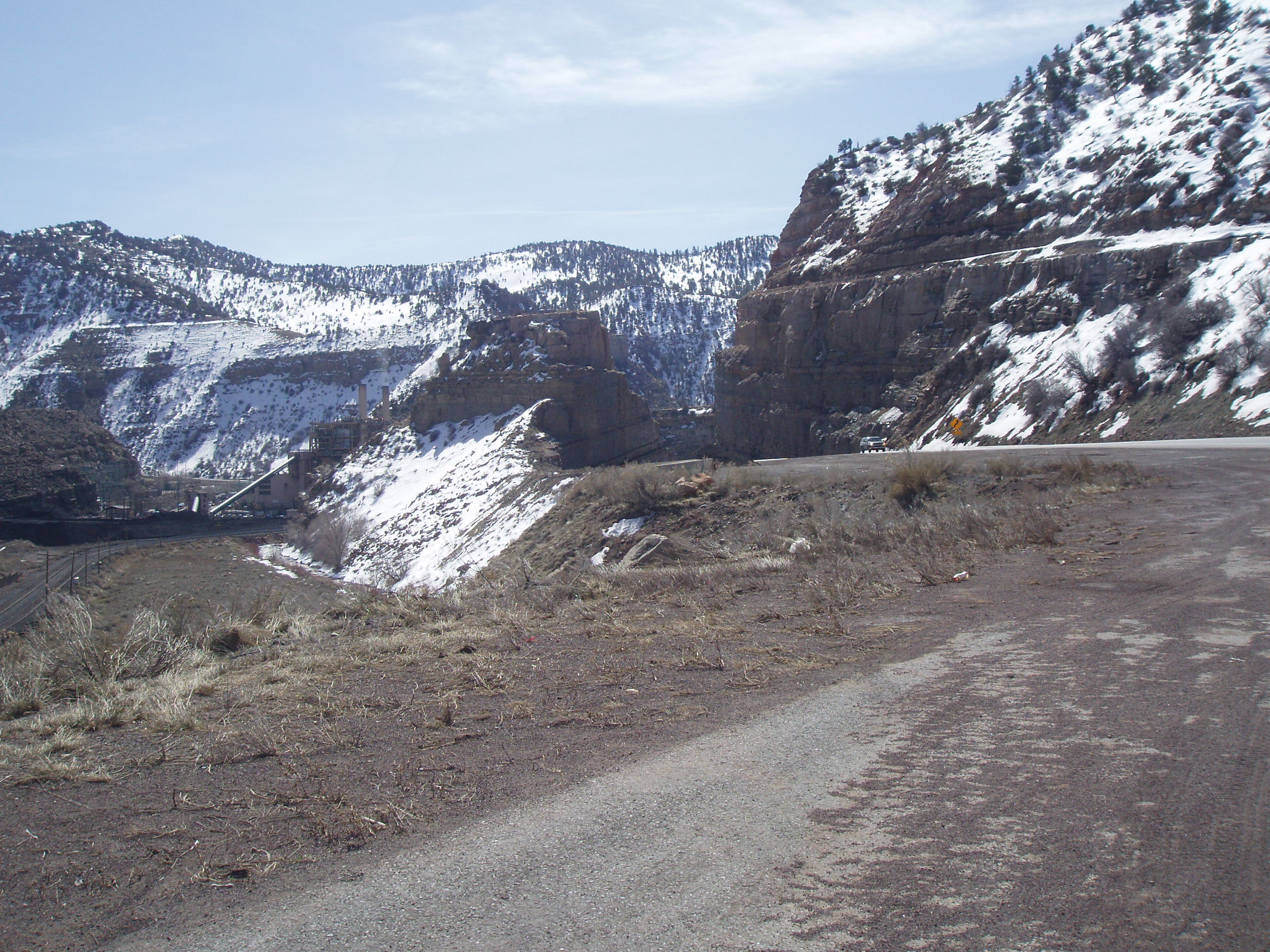
The neglected ruins of Castle Gate are visible in the left of the picture

=== Neglected site ===
- Only rubble left
- All buildings uninhabited
- Roofless building ruins
- Some buildings or houses still standing, but majority are roofless

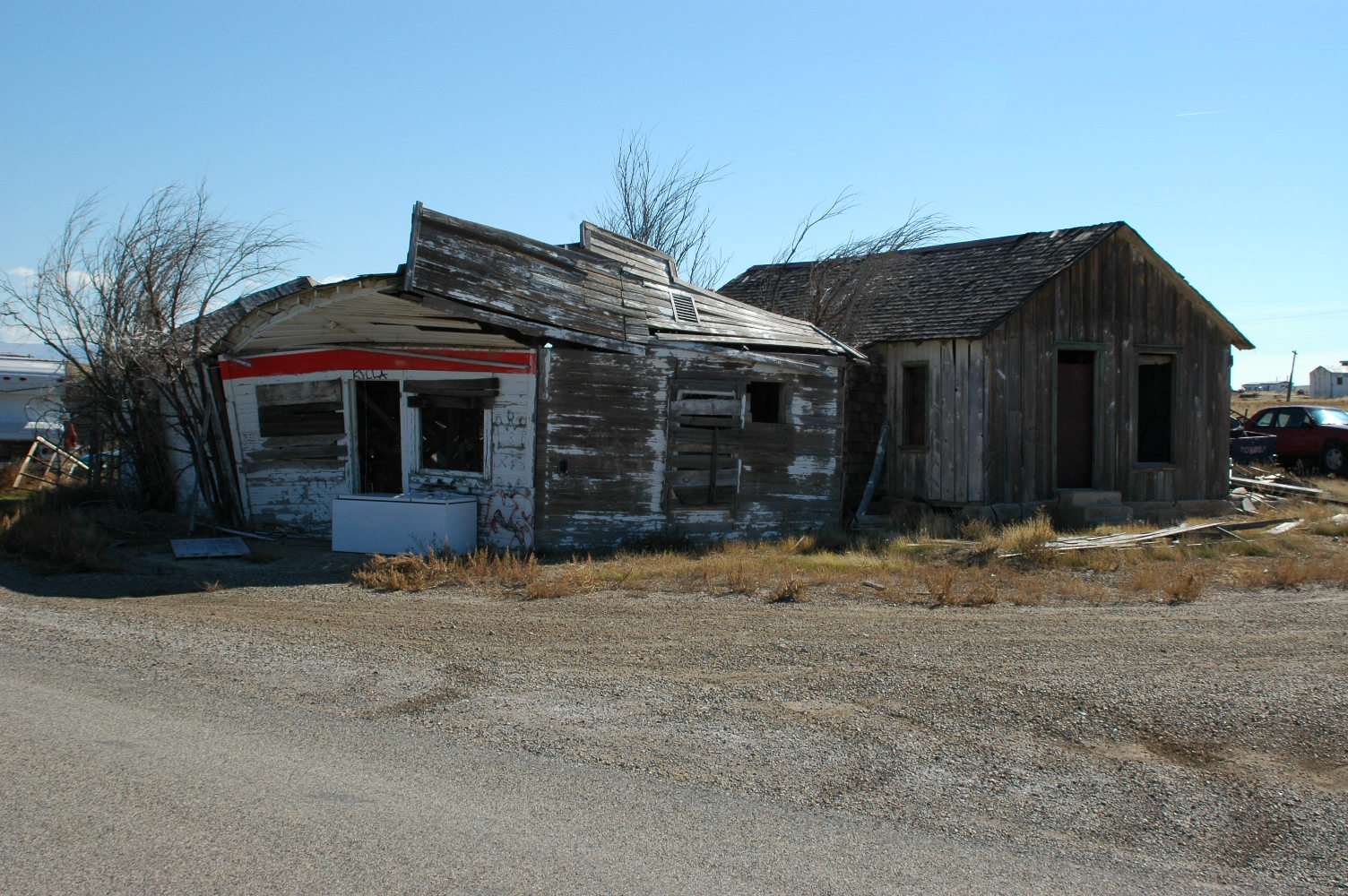
Cisco is abandoned now, but received a ZIP code in the 20th century

=== Abandoned site ===
- Building or houses still standing
- Buildings and houses all abandoned
- No population, except caretaker
- Site no longer in existence except for one or two buildings, for example old church, grocery store

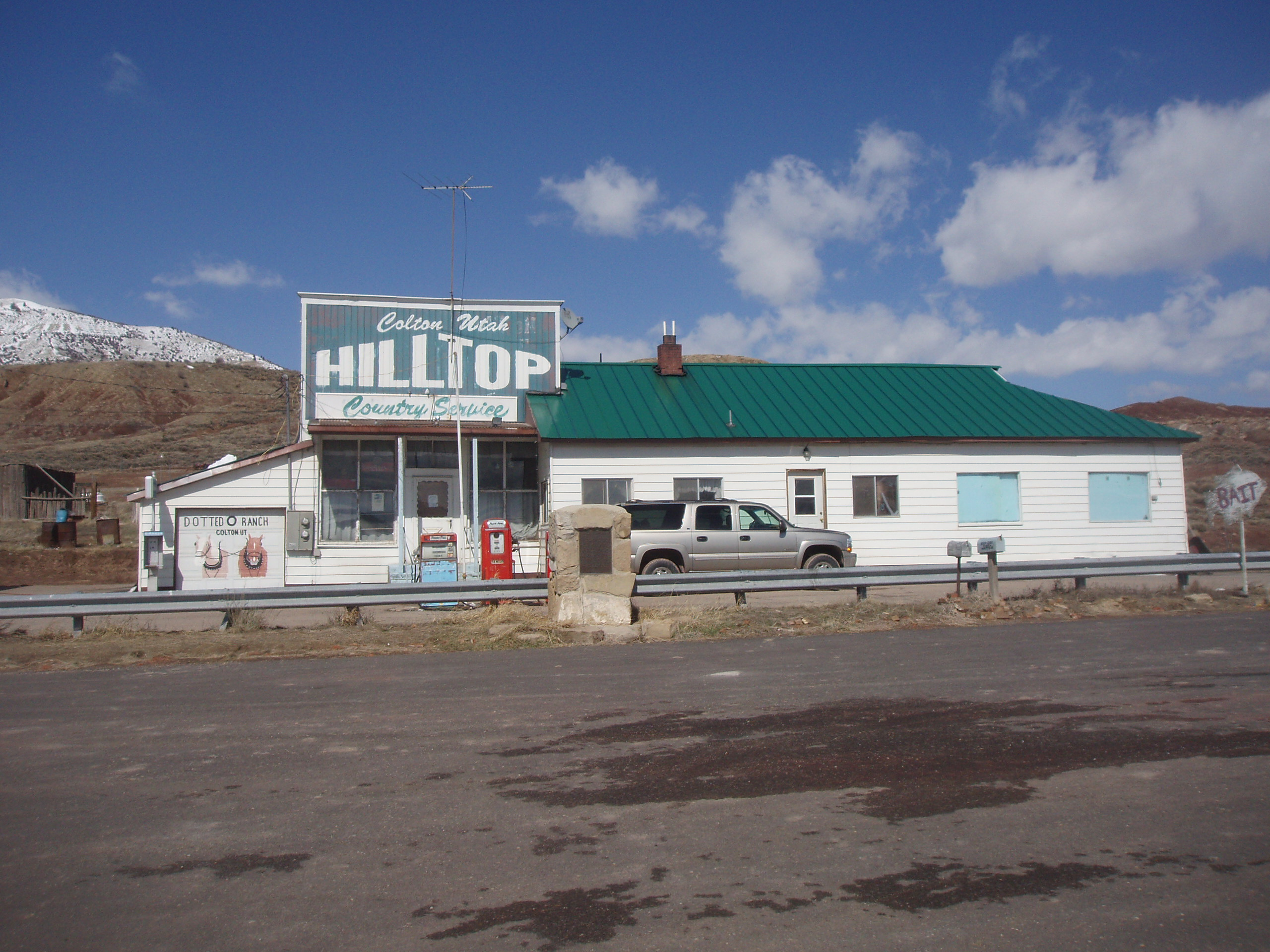
A store is one of the few buildings still in use at Colton

=== Semi abandoned site ===
- Building or houses still standing
- Buildings and houses largely abandoned
- Few residents
- Many abandoned buildings
- Small population

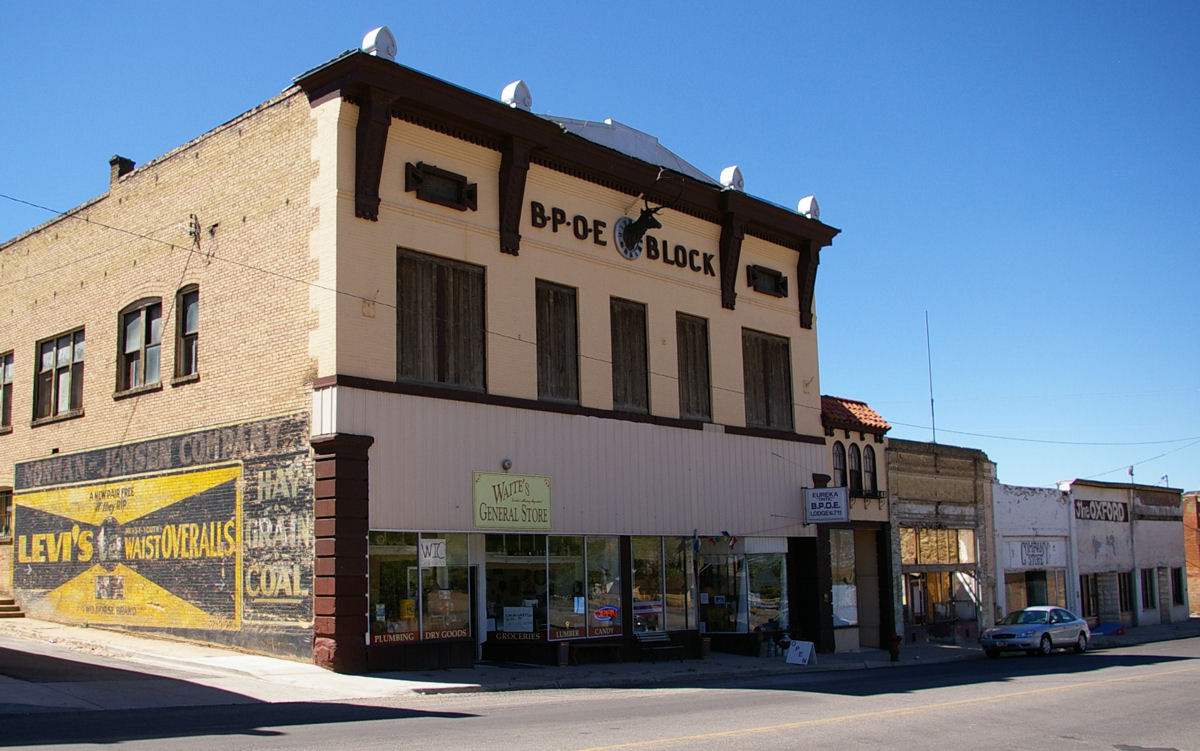
Eureka has significantly declined in population but is historically significant

=== Historic community ===
- Building or houses still standing
- Still a busy community
- Smaller than its boom years
- Population has decreased dramatically, to one fifth or less.

== List ==
Name	Other names	County	Location	Settled	Abandoned	Current status	Remarks
Adventure		Washington	Along the Virgin River east of Grafton	1860	1862		
Ajax		Tooele		1869	1900	Demolished	After becoming a hobo camp in the 1920s, a fire burnt the remaining structures down.
Alunite		Piute		c. 1915	c. 1930	Neglected/barren	Important mining town during World War I
Aragonite		Tooele		the early 1900s		Neglected/restricted	The historic townsite is part of the restricted West Desert Hazardous Industries District.
Argyle		Rich		c. 1875	c. 1915		
Asay		Garfield					
Bacchus		Salt Lake		1915			
Benmore		Tooele		1863	1918		
Bingham Canyon		Salt Lake		February 29, 1904	1972		
Black Rock		Millard		1876	1959	Semi-abandoned	
Blacks Fork		Summit		1870	1930		
Blue Creek		Box Elder		1869	1900s		
Bridgeport		Daggett		1902	1940		
Bullion		Piute					
Bullionville		Uintah					
Caineville		Wayne		1882			
Castle Gate		Carbon		1888	1974		
Castle Rock	Frenchies	Summit		1860			
Castleton		Grand		1880	1967		
Cedar Creek		Box Elder		the 1860s	1925		
Chicken Creek		Juab		1860	1876		
Cisco		Grand		the 1880s			
Clarion		Sanpete		1911	1916		An experiment in Jewish homesteading.
Clear Lake		Millard		early March of 1880			
Coal City		Carbon		1885			
Colton		Utah		1874			
Connellsville		Emery		1874			
Consumers		Carbon		1921			
Delle		Tooele		1880			
Desert Lake		Emery		1885	c. 1910		
Dewey		Grand		1880s	1916		
Diamond		Juab		1870			
Dividend		Utah		1907			
Dover		Sanpete		1877	1930s		
Dragon		Uintah		c. 1888			
Duncan's Retreat		Washington		c. 1861	c. 1895		
Eagle City		Garfield		c. 1890			
Elgin		Grand		1905			
Eureka	Ruby Hollow	Juab		1869	-		
Fish Springs		Juab		1959			
Forest City		Utah		1871			
Fort Harmony		Washington		1852	1862		
Frisco		Beaver		1879	1929		
Fruita		Wayne		1880			
Fry Canyon		San Juan		1950s	1950s		
Garfield		Salt Lake		1882			
Georgetown		Kane		1789			
Giles		Wayne		c. 1883	c. 1919		
Gold Hill		Tooele		1892			
Golden		Box Elder					
Goshute		Juab					
Grafton		Washington		1859	c. 1944		Restored and preserved as a filming location.
Grass Creek		Summit		c. 1860	c. 1940		
Greendale		Daggett		Early 1900s	1960s		
Hailstone		Wasatch		1864			
Hale		Carbon					
Hamblin		Washington		1856	1905		
Hardup		Box Elder					
Harper		Duchesne/Carbon		1886			
Harrisburg	Harrisville	Washington		1859	1895		
Hatton	Petersburg	Millard		1867	1869		
Hebron		Washington		1862	1902		
Hiawatha		Carbon		1911	November 20, 1992	Few Families Live there.	
Hillsdale		Garfield		1871			
Hite		Garfield		1881		Submerged	
Homansville		Utah		1872			
Home of Truth		San Juan		1933			
Iosepa		Tooele		1889	1917		
Iron City	Old Irontown, Old Iron Town, Irontown	Iron		1868	1876	Semi-abandoned	
Jackson		Box Elder					
Johnson		Kane	12 miles east of Kanab	1871			
Jordanelle		Wasatch					
Joy		Juab					
Keetley		Wasatch		March 1942			
Kelton		Box Elder		1869	1942		
Kimberly		Piute		1890s	1910		
Kiz		Carbon		c. 1906	c. 1940		
Knight		Juab					
Knightsville		Juab		1896	1940		
Kyune		Utah	between the Soldier Summit and Helper				
La Plata		Cache		the 1890s.			
Lark		Salt Lake					Copper mining town
Latuda		Carbon					
Linwood		Daggett	5 miles east of Manila				
Loseeville		Garfield					
Low		Tooele					
Lucin		Box Elder			1936		
Mammoth		Juab					
Matlin		Box Elder		1919	c. 1930		Failed housing project
McCornick		Millard					
Mercur		Tooele					
Mill Fork		Utah					
Miners Basin	Basin	Grand		1898	1908		
Mohrland		Carbon					
Mosida		Utah					
Mountain Dell		Salt Lake					
Mutual		Carbon					
National		Carbon					
Newhouse		Beaver					
Notom		Wayne					
Northrop		Washington		1861	1862		
Paria	Pahreah	Kane					
Peerless		Carbon	3 miles west of Helper				
Prattville		Sevier					
Price City	Heberville	Washington		1858	c. 1908		
Rainbow		Uintah					
Rains		Carbon					
Richardson		Grand					
Rockport		Summit		1860	1953		
Round Valley		Rich					
Royal	Bear Canyon, Cameron, Rolapp	Carbon					
Russian Settlement		Box Elder		1914			
Sage Creek		Rich					
Salduro		Tooele					
Scranton		Tooele					
Sego		Grand		c. 1910	1955		
Shunesburg		Washington		1861	1902		
Silver City		Juab					
Silver Reef		Washington		1875	c. 1900		
Soldier Summit		Wasatch					
Spring Canyon	Storrs	Carbon		1912			
Standardville		Carbon		1912			
Stateline		Iron					
Stewart		Carbon					
Sulphurdale		Beaver		1870			
Sunshine		Tooele					
Sweet		Carbon					
Terrace		Box Elder					
Thistle		Utah			1983	Submerged	
Tonaquint		Washington		c. 1855-1856	1862		
Tucker		Utah					
Upper Kanab		Kane					
Valley City		Grand					
Verdure		San Juan					
Victor		Emery					
Vipont		Box Elder					
Wahsatch		Summit					
Washakie		Box Elder		1880			
Watson		Uintah					
Wattis		Carbon					
Westwater		Grand					
Widtsoe		Garfield		1908	Declined in 1936	Semi-abandoned	
Winter Quarters		Carbon			1922		
Woodrow		Millard					
Woodside		Emery					
