= Russian Settlement, Utah =

Ghost town in Box Elder County, Utah, United States

Russian Settlement
- Ghost town
- Location within Utah Location within the United States
- Coordinates: 41°43′N 113°21′W
- Country: United States
- State: Utah
- County: Box Elder
- Established: April 1914
- Abandoned: 1917
- Elevation: 4,850 ft (1,480 m)

Russian Settlement is a ghost town in the Park Valley area of Box Elder County, Utah, United States. It is not known what name, if any, the settlers from Russia gave to their community; it has been called "Box Elder County's ghost town with no name." The settlement, which lasted about 1914–1917, was formed by a group of Molokan Spiritual Christians from Russia of mixed faiths and ethnicities. The colony failed quickly because the company who sold them the land exaggerated its quality and never provided promised facilities to make the land livable. The most noticeable remnant of Russian Settlement is a cemetery with two graves.

== History ==
Between 1910 and 1914, the Salt Lake City-based Pacific Land and Water Company acquired about 180,000 acres (73,000 ha) (280 sq.mi.) of property in Box Elder County to resell. This land consisted of former railroad land, the property of another company absorbed by Pacific Land and Water, and tracts purchased from ranchers. Pacific Land and Water misrepresented this arid land in advertising, describing it as "amongst the richest in the state of Utah" that "only awaits the plow to yield up its vast treasures." Advertising described the local climate as "energizing," and it was claimed that the heavy growth of sagebrush indicated that the land was fertile for farming. Land was sold for US$17.50 per acre, financed at 7 percent interest, with 20 percent down and the remainder paid annually over five years.

In March 1914, a group of 20 Spiritual Christian men from Russia purchased 4 square miles (10 km^{2}) of land. These Spiritual Christians were Protestant-like Christians, mostly pryguny (Jumpers, Leapers). They had been living in Los Angeles, California for about a decade, and the older members of the group were becoming concerned about the effects of American urban culture on their youth, and feared that their tradition of arranged marriages was being threatened. They fled during a series of "bride-selling" cases held in Los Angeles Superior Court. The immigrants wanted to raise their children in a rural area immersed in their own language, culture, and traditions. The families, totaling approximately 100 to 125 people, traveled by train from Los Angeles to Kelton, Utah. A Pacific Land and Water employee brought them by wagon from Kelton to their new town site in April 1914.

=== Village ===
The settlement was laid out in a similar fashion to row villages in the Russian Empire. A main street running east to west centered the town. Each lot consisted of a 3-acre (1.2 ha) strip of land, with 200 feet (61 m) of frontage on the main road. Houses, barns, outbuildings, wells, and root cellars were constructed. The lumber used came from a Pacific Land and Water sawmill located in the nearby Raft River Mountains. Livestock was purchased from local ranchers, and crops were planted. Other small villages were founded by Spiritual Christian Molokane near Rosette and Dove Creek.

By August 1914, the number of school-age children had reached 40, prompting Box Elder County to establish a one-room school and provide a teacher. A portable school house was built on the west end of the main street, and the teacher, one of the settlers, was paid by Pacific Land and Water. The establishment of the school was perhaps premature; by November 1915, the school superintendent announced that the student population did not justify a school, and that the children would be sent by bus to Rosette for school.

=== Farming ===
The original land purchase by the immigrants consisted of 2,600 acres (1,100 ha), with each family receiving 80 acres (32 ha) outside of town for farming. This land, however, was used by only one settler. Most families farmed on their house lot and grew only gardens and small plots of hay and grain. Irrigation wells and pumps promised by Pacific Land and Water were never delivered, so most families irrigated with their domestic wells.

=== Decline ===
Repeated crop failures led to the abandonment of the town, beginning in 1915. In August 1916, the stove from the schoolhouse was sent to the Lucin school, and in September the entire school was disassembled and shipped to Promontory. By the end of 1917, Russian Settlement was a ghost town. Most of the settlers returned to the Los Angeles area. Box Elder County residents removed the buildings, moving some to new locations and salvaging the rest for materials.

== Remnants ==
No one has lived in the area since the Russians left. Some buildings stayed standing for many years, and the pattern of town lots was visible into the 1960s. Today, the main feature that remains is a weathered white picket fence surrounding two graves. Both headstones are in Russian. One grave is of Anna Kalpakoff, who was accidentally shot by her husband. The other is of her sister-in-law, Mary Kalpakoff, who died during childbirth. The current headstones were placed in 1966 by Mary's son and grandson who resided near Fresno, California. There are also clearly defined foundations, caved-in wells, and various artifacts. A cowboy on horseback fell into an old well here in 1937, barely escaping with his life. A hill just to the northwest is known as Russian Knoll, in honor of the immigrants who once lived in the area.

== See also ==
- List of ghost towns in Utah
