= 2004 United States presidential election in Utah =

- November 2, 2004
- Turnout: 72.6% (of registered voters); 57.7% (of voting age population)

Nominee	George W. Bush	John Kerry
Party	Republican	Democratic
Home state	Texas	Massachusetts
Running mate	Dick Cheney	John Edwards
Electoral vote	5	0
Popular vote	663,742	241,199
Percentage	71.54%	26.00%

Bush
50–60%
60–70%
70–80%
80–90%
President before election
George W. Bush
Republican
Elected President
George W. Bush
Republican

The 2004 United States presidential election in Utah took place on November 2, 2004. It was part of the 2004 United States presidential election. Voters chose five representatives, or electors to the Electoral College, who voted for president and vice president.

Utah was won by incumbent President George W. Bush by a 45.5% margin of victory. Prior to the election, all leading news organizations considered this a state Bush would win, or otherwise considered as a safe red state. It is a strongly Republican state and has supported the party's nominee in every presidential election since 1968. With 71.54 percent of the popular vote, Utah was Bush's strongest state in the 2004 election.

This was the first of five instances in which a presidential candidate gained over 70% of a state's vote after Ronald Reagan's 1984 landslide. The others are Mitt Romney in Utah in 2012, Barack Obama in Hawaii in 2008 and 2012 and Donald Trump in Wyoming in 2024. Three of these involved a candidate with a close tie to the state: Barack Obama was born in Hawaii, and Mitt Romney, as the first Mormon on a major-party presidential ticket, was popular in Mormon-majority Utah and would later represent the state in the United States Senate.

== Primaries ==
- 2004 Utah Democratic presidential primary

== Campaign ==
=== Predictions ===
There were 12 news organizations who made state-by-state predictions of the election. Here are their last predictions before election day.

Source	Ranking
D.C. Political Report	Solid R
Cook Political Report	Solid R
Research 2000	Solid R
Zogby International	Likely R
Washington Post	Likely R
Washington Dispatch	Likely R
Washington Times	Solid R
The New York Times	Solid R
CNN	Likely R
Newsweek	Solid R
Associated Press	Solid R
Rasmussen Reports	Likely R

=== Polling ===
The final three polls averaged Bush with 67 percent to Kerry with 25 percent.

=== Fundraising ===
Bush raised $561,645. Kerry raised $262,031.

=== Advertising and visits ===
Neither campaign advertised or visited this state during the fall election.

== Analysis ==
Republicans dominate Utah state politics because of the very high Mormon population that accounts for almost seventy percent of the residents throughout the state. Mormons have been known for having very conservative values. While every county voted for Bush, areas such as Summit County (ski resort), Moab (becoming an outpost for environmental activists), Carbon County (largely blue collar), Salt Lake City (urban area with some diversity) and San Juan County (economically distressed and mostly Native American) did give a somewhat greater proportion of their votes to Kerry. However, other areas were uniformly Republican in voting. Utah County's (home of Provo and Brigham Young University) Republican vote (86%) was by far the largest percentage of any county its size in America.

== Results ==
2004 United States presidential election in Utah
Party	Candidate	Votes	Percentage	Electoral votes
Republican	George W. Bush (incumbent)	663,742	71.54%	5
Democratic	John Kerry	241,199	26.00%	0
Unaffiliated	Ralph Nader	11,305	1.22%	0
Constitution Party	Michael Peroutka	6,841	0.74%	0
Libertarian Party	Michael Badnarik	3,375	0.36%	0
Personal Choice Party	Charles Jay	946	0.10%	0
Socialist Workers Party	Roger Calero	393	0.04%	0
Green Party	David Cobb	39	0.00%	0
Write Ins		4	0.00%	0
Totals		927,844	100.00%	5
Voter turnout (Voting age population)				57.7%

=== Results by county ===
County	George W. Bush Republican		John Kerry Democratic		Ralph Nader Unaffiliated		Michael Peroutka Constitution		Various candidates Other parties		Margin		Total votes cast
County	#	%	#	%	#	%	#	%	#	%	#	%	Total votes cast
Beaver	2,023	79.52%	493	19.38%	12	0.47%	9	0.35%	7	0.28%	1,530	60.14%	2,544
Box Elder	15,751	85.75%	2,244	12.22%	145	0.79%	144	0.78%	84	0.46%	13,507	73.53%	18,368
Cache	32,486	81.76%	6,375	16.05%	413	1.04%	274	0.69%	183	0.46%	26,111	65.71%	39,731
Carbon	4,950	58.18%	3,415	40.14%	83	0.98%	22	0.26%	38	0.45%	1,535	18.04%	8,508
Daggett	380	76.15%	108	21.64%	6	1.20%	3	0.60%	2	0.20%	272	54.51%	499
Davis	86,187	78.88%	20,893	19.12%	1,055	0.97%	695	0.64%	438	0.41%	65,294	59.76%	109,268
Duchesne	4,742	85.35%	738	13.28%	27	0.49%	32	0.58%	17	0.31%	4,004	72.07%	5,556
Emery	3,781	80.83%	831	17.76%	23	0.49%	29	0.62%	14	0.30%	2,950	63.07%	4,678
Garfield	1,848	85.48%	264	12.21%	22	1.02%	16	0.74%	12	0.56%	1,584	73.27%	2,162
Grand	2,130	51.14%	1,858	44.61%	118	2.83%	20	0.48%	39	0.94%	272	6.53%	4,165
Iron	12,815	82.97%	2,267	14.68%	111	0.72%	169	1.09%	84	0.54%	10,548	68.29%	15,446
Juab	2,681	78.46%	605	17.71%	20	0.59%	98	2.87%	13	0.38%	2,076	60.75%	3,417
Kane	2,414	79.12%	576	18.88%	25	0.82%	19	0.62%	17	0.55%	1,838	60.24%	3,051
Millard	4,084	83.74%	626	12.84%	28	0.57%	118	2.42%	21	0.43%	3,458	70.90%	4,877
Morgan	3,301	85.94%	472	12.29%	25	0.65%	24	0.62%	19	0.49%	2,829	73.65%	3,841
Piute	646	83.57%	123	15.91%	3	0.39%	1	0.13%	0	0.00%	523	67.66%	773
Rich	922	88.91%	109	10.51%	5	0.48%	1	0.10%	0	0.00%	813	78.40%	1,037
Salt Lake	215,728	59.57%	135,949	37.54%	6,025	1.66%	2,199	0.61%	2,237	0.62%	79,779	22.03%	362,138
San Juan	2,971	60.02%	1,906	38.51%	30	0.61%	24	0.48%	19	0.38%	1,065	21.51%	4,950
Sanpete	7,004	82.33%	1,189	13.98%	58	0.68%	217	2.55%	39	0.46%	5,815	68.35%	8,507
Sevier	6,597	86.34%	920	12.04%	37	0.48%	60	0.79%	27	0.35%	5,677	74.30%	7,641
Summit	7,936	51.83%	6,977	45.57%	265	1.73%	36	0.24%	98	0.64%	959	6.26%	15,312
Tooele	12,181	73.10%	4,130	24.78%	150	0.90%	111	0.67%	92	0.55%	8,051	48.32%	16,664
Uintah	8,518	85.55%	1,266	12.71%	42	0.42%	99	0.99%	32	0.32%	7,252	72.84%	9,957
Utah	128,269	85.99%	17,357	11.64%	1,289	0.86%	1,621	1.09%	637	0.43%	110,912	74.35%	149,173
Wasatch	5,503	73.26%	1,854	24.68%	60	0.80%	65	0.87%	30	0.40%	3,649	48.58%	7,512
Washington	35,633	80.95%	7,513	17.07%	301	0.68%	362	0.82%	209	0.47%	28,120	63.88%	44,018
Wayne	1,062	78.09%	279	20.51%	10	0.74%	5	0.37%	4	0.29%	783	57.58%	1,360
Weber	51,199	70.43%	19,862	27.32%	917	1.26%	368	0.51%	345	0.47%	31,337	43.11%	72,691
Totals	663,742	71.54%	241,199	26.00%	11,305	1.22%	6,841	0.74%	4,757	0.51%	422,543	45.54%	927,844

=== Results by congressional district ===
Bush won all three congressional districts, including one held by a Democrat.

District	Bush	Kerry	Representative
1st	73%	25%	Rob Bishop
2nd	66%	31%	Jim Matheson
3rd	77%	20%	Chris Cannon

== Electors ==
Technically the voters of Utah cast their ballots for electors: representatives to the Electoral College. Utah is allocated five electors because it has three congressional districts and two senators. All candidates who appear on the ballot or qualify to receive write-in votes must submit a list of five electors, who pledge to vote for their candidate and his or her running mate. Whoever wins a plurality of votes in the state is awarded all five electoral votes. Their chosen electors then vote for president and vice president. Although electors are pledged to their candidate and running mate, they are not obligated to vote for them. An elector who votes for someone other than his or her candidate is known as a faithless elector.

The electors of each state and the District of Columbia met on December 13, 2004, to cast their votes for president and vice president. The Electoral College itself never meets as one body. Instead the electors from each state and the District of Columbia met in their respective capitols.

The following were the members of the Electoral College from the state. All 5 were pledged to Bush/Cheney:

1. Olene S. Walker
2. Gayle McKeachnie
3. Lewis K. Billings
4. Joseph A. Cannon
5. Scott F. Simpson

== See also ==
- United States presidential elections in Utah
- Presidency of George W. Bush
