= Golden, Utah =

- Ghost town
- Interactive map of Golden, Utah
- Coordinates: 41.8237°N 113.4422°W
- Country: United States
- State: Utah
- County: Box Elder
- Founded: c. 1900
- Abandoned: 1907
- Named for: Area gold mines

Golden is a ghost town in Box Elder County, Utah, United States. It is located 6 miles (9.7 km) west of Park Valley, near the southern base of the Raft River Mountains.

== History ==
In 1899 and 1900, several gold ore-rich strikes were made in the Raft River Mountains, and the principal camp that grew around them was named Golden. As the mining progressed, the ore changed from gold to silver, with quantities of up to 1,000 ounces (28 kg) per ton. The population of Golden grew to an estimated 500 residents.

=== Decline ===
An American financial crisis, the panic of 1907, damaged the mining industry severely. Legal tender currency was replaced with nearly worthless scrip, so the miners left. The general store moved its wares to Park Valley and Rosette, and the town was abandoned.

=== Resurgence ===
In 1910, several mines reopened, and the town had a short resurgence, then a boom in 1920, when a silver-rich ore was struck in Vipont. A tramway was built from the Vipont Mine to a concentrating mill, and 300 well-paid workers were hired. Ore was shipped from the area into the 1940s.

== See also ==
- List of ghost towns in Utah
