= Blacks Fork, Utah =

Blacks Fork
- Ghost town
- Location within Utah Location within the United States
- Coordinates: 40°58′17″N 110°35′14″W
- Country: United States
- State: Utah
- County: Summit
- Founded: 1870
- Abandoned: 1930
- Named for: Blacks Fork
- Elevation: 8,848 ft (2,697 m)
- GNIS feature ID: 1444064

Blacks Fork, also known as Blacks Fork Commissary, is a ghost town in Summit County, Utah, United States. Named for the Blacks Fork River, it was a logging town that operated from 1870 to 1930.

== History ==
Blacks Fork was established in 1870 as a logging camp that supplied lumber to the railroad and mining industries. A large barn was erected near the center of the town, and several businesses and homes were built around the barn. Tradition says that the town also served as a military commissary during the early part of its history, but Utah ghost towns researcher Stephen Carr concluded that "...this suggestion is very unlikely," citing the camp's remote location and harsh climate, as well as the fact that an army post called "Blacks Fork" already existed near Bryan, Wyoming. The population peaked at about 100, but the town was soon abandoned. Remaining are the barn, a post office, and a few homes.

== Climate ==
Climate data for Blacks Fork Jct, Utah, 2011–2020 normals: 8870ft (2704m)
Month	Jan	Feb	Mar	Apr	May	Jun	Jul	Aug	Sep	Oct	Nov	Dec	Year
Record high °F (°C)	61 (16)	58 (14)	65 (18)	67 (19)	72 (22)	80 (27)	80 (27)	84 (29)	79 (26)	71 (22)	63 (17)	54 (12)	84 (29)
Mean maximum °F (°C)	52.3 (11.3)	50.1 (10.1)	55.8 (13.2)	61.4 (16.3)	67.5 (19.7)	76.6 (24.8)	78.5 (25.8)	78.2 (25.7)	74.0 (23.3)	64.6 (18.1)	57.2 (14.0)	50.9 (10.5)	77.6 (25.3)
Mean daily maximum °F (°C)	36.6 (2.6)	35.7 (2.1)	43.2 (6.2)	46.6 (8.1)	54.2 (12.3)	66.4 (19.1)	72.1 (22.3)	70.9 (21.6)	63.3 (17.4)	51.4 (10.8)	42.1 (5.6)	34.3 (1.3)	51.4 (10.8)
Daily mean °F (°C)	19.8 (−6.8)	18.9 (−7.3)	27.2 (−2.7)	32.4 (0.2)	41.1 (5.1)	49.9 (9.9)	55.9 (13.3)	54.5 (12.5)	47.7 (8.7)	37.4 (3.0)	27.3 (−2.6)	18.4 (−7.6)	35.9 (2.1)
Mean daily minimum °F (°C)	2.9 (−16.2)	2.6 (−16.3)	11.2 (−11.6)	18.2 (−7.7)	27.9 (−2.3)	33.4 (0.8)	39.7 (4.3)	38.0 (3.3)	32.2 (0.1)	23.4 (−4.8)	12.5 (−10.8)	2.6 (−16.3)	20.4 (−6.5)
Mean minimum °F (°C)	−22.2 (−30.1)	−24.3 (−31.3)	−12.2 (−24.6)	−3.2 (−19.6)	12.6 (−10.8)	24.5 (−4.2)	31.0 (−0.6)	30.6 (−0.8)	20.9 (−6.2)	2.9 (−16.2)	−11.7 (−24.3)	−23.1 (−30.6)	−29.6 (−34.2)
Record low °F (°C)	−36 (−38)	−41 (−41)	−24 (−31)	−12 (−24)	−4 (−20)	19 (−7)	27 (−3)	28 (−2)	16 (−9)	−20 (−29)	−21 (−29)	−32 (−36)	−41 (−41)
Average precipitation inches (mm)	1.91 (49)	1.91 (49)	2.23 (57)	2.85 (72)	2.67 (68)	1.37 (35)	1.41 (36)	1.83 (46)	1.85 (47)	2.11 (54)	2.10 (53)	1.88 (48)	24.12 (614)
Source 1: XMACIS2
Source 2: NOAA (Precipitation)

== See also ==
- List of ghost towns in Utah
