= Upton, Utah =

Unincorporated community in the state of Utah, United States

- Unincorporated community
- Location within Utah Location within the United States
- Coordinates: 40°57′49″N 111°14′08″W
- Country: United States
- State: Utah
- County: Summit
- Elevation: 6,165 ft (1,879 m)
- Time zone: UTC-7 (Mountain (MST))
  - Summer (DST): UTC-6 (MDT)
- Area code: 435
- GNIS feature ID: 1437709

Upton is an unincorporated community in Summit County, Utah, United States. The community is on Chalk Creek Road 9.1 miles (14.6 km) east-northeast of Coalville.
