= Asay, Utah =

Ghost town in Utah

Coordinates: 37°35′08″N 112°28′55″W

Asay is an abandoned town located in Garfield County, Utah. It started as a farming community in the late 19th century, but the high altitude climate produced low crop yields thereby, making the lands unworkable. A cabin and some farm structures still stand, but it sits on private land and not easily accessible.

== See also ==
- List of ghost towns in Utah
