= Plymouth, Utah =

- Town
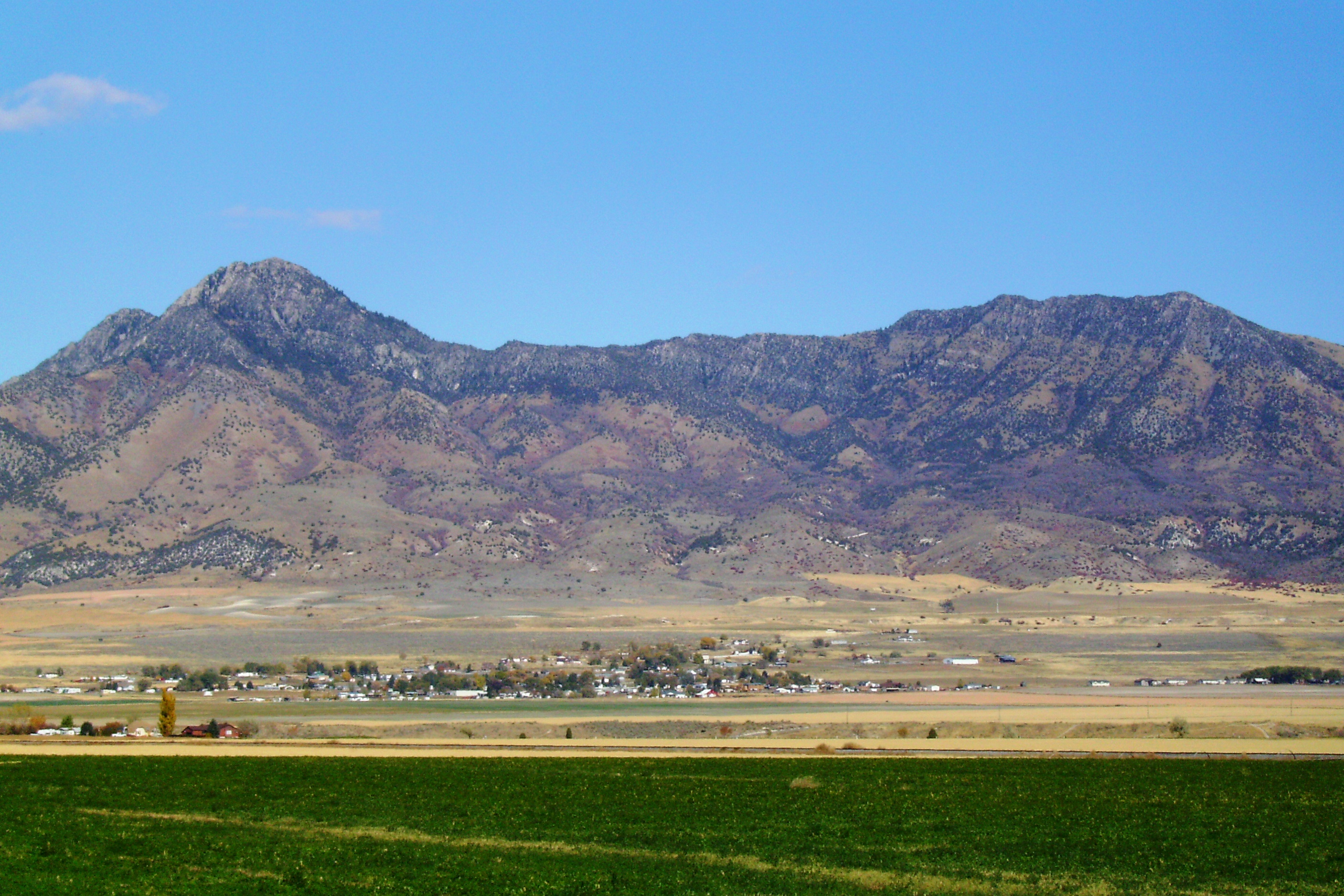
- Plymouth, Utah, with Gunsight Peak in background

- Location in Box Elder County and the state of Utah.

- Location of Utah in the United States
- Coordinates: 41°52′30″N 112°08′51″W
- Country: United States
- State: Utah
- County: Box Elder
- Founded: 1869
- Incorporated: 1933
- Named for: Plymouth Rock

Area
  - Total: 0.83 sq mi (2.14 km^{2})
  - Land: 0.83 sq mi (2.14 km^{2})
  - Water: 0 sq mi (0.00 km^{2})
- Elevation: 4,469 ft (1,362 m)

Population (2020)
  - Total: 427
  - Density: 556.3/sq mi (214.79/km^{2})
- Time zone: UTC-7 (Mountain (MST))
  - Summer (DST): UTC-6 (MDT)
- ZIP code: 84330
- Area code: 435
- FIPS code: 49-61260
- GNIS feature ID: 2412492

Plymouth is a town in Box Elder County, Utah, United States. The population was 427 at the 2020 census.

== Geography ==
According to the United States Census Bureau, the town has a total area of 0.5 square mile (1.4 km^{2}), all land.

== Demographics ==
Historical population
Census	Pop.	Note	%±
1880	300		—
1890	319		6.3%
1900	549		72.1%
1910	263		−52.1%
1920	319		21.3%
1930	340		6.6%
1940	292		−14.1%
1950	228		−21.9%
1960	231		1.3%
1970	203		−12.1%
1980	238		17.2%
1990	267		12.2%
2000	328		22.8%
2010	414		26.2%
2020	427		3.1%
U.S. Decennial Census

As of the census of 2000, there were 328 people, 105 households, and 89 families residing in the town. The population density was 607.0 people per square mile (234.5/km^{2}). There were 114 housing units at an average density of 211.0 per square mile (81.5/km^{2}). The racial makeup of the town was 99.09% White, 0.30% Native American, and 0.61% from two or more races. Hispanic or Latino of any race were 1.52% of the population.

There were 105 households, out of which 51.4% had children under the age of 18 living with them, 70.5% were married couples living together, 10.5% had a female householder with no husband present, and 15.2% were non-families. 15.2% of all households were made up of individuals, and 7.6% had someone living alone who was 65 years of age or older. The average household size was 3.12 and the average family size was 3.45.

In the town, the population was spread out, with 36.0% under the age of 18, 12.8% from 18 to 24, 24.1% from 25 to 44, 18.3% from 45 to 64, and 8.8% who were 65 years of age or older. The median age was 27 years. For every 100 females, there were 91.8 males. For every 100 females age 18 and over, there were 85.8 males.

The median income for a household in the town was $41,250, and the median income for a family was $48,750. Males had a median income of $39,250 versus $16,607 for females. The per capita income for the town was $15,377. About 7.1% of families and 9.0% of the population were below the poverty line, including 12.3% of those under age 18 and 9.1% of those age 65 or over.

== Notable people ==
- Jardee Steed Rancher
