= 2000 United States presidential election in Utah =

- November 7, 2000
- Turnout: 69.85% (of registered voters)

Nominee	George W. Bush	Al Gore
Party	Republican	Democratic
Home state	Texas	Tennessee
Running mate	Dick Cheney	Joe Lieberman
Electoral vote	5	0
Popular vote	515,096	203,053
Percentage	66.83%	26.34%
County results
Bush
50–60%
60–70%
70–80%
80–90%
President before election
Bill Clinton
Democratic
Elected President
George W. Bush
Republican

The 2000 United States presidential election in Utah took place on November 7, 2000, as part of the 2000 United States presidential election. Voters chose five representatives, or electors to the Electoral College, who voted for president and vice president.

Utah was won by Texas Governor George W. Bush by a 40.49 percent margin of victory. With 66.83 percent of the popular vote, the state proved to be Bush's third strongest state in the 2000 election after neighboring Wyoming and Idaho. In contrast, Gore performed worse in Utah than in any other state, receiving barely a quarter of the vote.

== Primary elections ==
Utah held direct presidential primary elections for the first time in 2000. The date of the presidential primary was March 10, 2000.

=== Republican primary ===
2000 Republican presidential primary election in Utah
Party	Candidate	Votes	%
Republican	George W. Bush	57,617	63.28%
Republican	Alan Keyes	19,367	21.27%
Republican	John McCain	12,784	14.04%
Republican	Steve Forbes	859	0.94%
Republican	Gary Bauer	426	0.47%
Total votes		91,053	100.00%

=== Democratic primary ===
2000 Democratic presidential primary election in Utah
Party	Candidate	Votes	%
Democratic	Al Gore	12,527	79.86%
Democratic	Bill Bradley	3,160	20.14%
Total votes		15,687	100.00%

=== Independent American primary ===
2000 Independent American presidential primary election in Utah
Party	Candidate	Votes	%
Independent American	Howard Phillips	630	56.76%
Independent American	Earl Dodge	480	43.24%
Total votes		1,110	100.00%

== General election ==
=== Polling ===
Poll source	Date(s)	Sample size	Margin of error	George W. Bush (R)	Al Gore (D)	Ralph Nader (G)	Other / undecided (Note: Calculated by taking the difference of 100% and all other listed candidates combined. For polls that do not report a figure for Nader, this includes his support.)
Harris Insights & Analytics	November 3, 2000	1,641	—	65%	25%	6%	4%
Valley Research	November 3, 2000	1,300	—	60%	24%	4%	12%
Rasmussen Reports	October 24, 2000	918	—	62%	24%	—	14%

=== Results ===
2000 United States presidential election in Utah
Party	Candidate	Votes	%
Republican	George W. Bush	515,096	66.83%
Democratic	Al Gore	203,053	26.34%
Green	Ralph Nader	35,850	4.65%
Reform	Patrick Buchanan	9,319	1.21%
Libertarian	Harry Browne	3,616	0.47%
Independent American	Howard Phillips	2,709	0.35%
Natural Law	John Hagelin	763	0.10%
Socialist Workers	James Harris	186	0.02%
Independent	Louie G. Youngkeit	161	0.02%
Write-in	Keith Lewis Kunzler	1	0.00%
Total votes		770,754	100.00%

==== Results by county ====
County	George W. Bush Republican		Al Gore Democratic		Ralph Nader Green		Various candidates Other parties		Margin		Total votes cast
County	#	%	#	%	#	%	#	%	#	%	Total votes cast
Beaver	1,653	73.40%	541	24.02%	38	1.69%	20	0.89%	1,112	49.38%	2,252
Box Elder	12,288	79.36%	2,555	16.50%	326	2.11%	314	2.03%	9,733	62.86%	15,483
Cache	25,920	78.21%	5,170	15.60%	1,511	4.56%	541	1.63%	20,750	62.61%	33,142
Carbon	3,758	50.89%	3,298	44.66%	213	2.88%	115	1.56%	460	6.23%	7,384
Daggett	317	72.87%	104	23.91%	9	2.07%	5	1.15%	213	48.96%	435
Davis	64,375	73.27%	18,845	21.45%	2,891	3.29%	1,744	1.99%	45,530	51.82%	87,855
Duchesne	3,622	79.67%	779	17.14%	76	1.67%	69	1.52%	2,843	62.53%	4,546
Emery	3,243	73.74%	958	21.78%	81	1.84%	116	2.64%	2,285	51.96%	4,398
Garfield	1,719	87.35%	178	9.04%	43	2.18%	28	1.42%	1,541	78.31%	1,968
Grand	1,822	50.42%	1,158	32.04%	540	14.94%	94	2.60%	664	18.38%	3,614
Iron	10,106	80.24%	1,789	14.21%	341	2.71%	358	2.84%	8,317	66.03%	12,594
Juab	2,023	72.64%	619	22.23%	60	2.15%	83	2.98%	1,404	50.41%	2,785
Kane	2,254	80.44%	387	13.81%	102	3.64%	59	2.11%	1,867	66.63%	2,802
Millard	3,850	80.63%	696	14.58%	73	1.53%	156	3.27%	3,154	66.05%	4,775
Morgan	2,464	77.70%	553	17.44%	80	2.52%	74	2.33%	1,911	60.26%	3,171
Piute	626	80.15%	133	17.03%	10	1.28%	12	1.54%	493	63.12%	781
Rich	736	81.51%	152	16.83%	10	1.11%	5	0.55%	584	64.68%	903
Salt Lake	171,585	55.84%	107,576	35.01%	21,252	6.92%	6,845	2.23%	64,009	20.83%	307,258
San Juan	2,721	57.36%	1,838	38.74%	107	2.26%	78	1.64%	883	18.62%	4,744
Sanpete	5,781	77.81%	1,211	16.30%	153	2.06%	285	3.84%	4,570	61.51%	7,430
Sevier	5,763	81.43%	1,046	14.78%	125	1.77%	143	2.02%	4,717	66.65%	7,077
Summit	6,168	50.89%	4,601	37.96%	1,156	9.54%	196	1.62%	1,567	12.93%	12,121
Tooele	7,807	62.56%	4,001	32.06%	387	3.10%	285	2.28%	3,806	30.50%	12,480
Uintah	6,733	80.18%	1,387	16.52%	132	1.57%	145	1.73%	5,346	63.66%	8,397
Utah	98,255	81.70%	16,445	13.67%	2,732	2.27%	2,824	2.35%	81,810	68.03%	120,256
Wasatch	3,819	67.30%	1,476	26.01%	259	4.56%	121	2.13%	2,343	41.29%	5,675
Washington	25,481	78.50%	5,465	16.84%	714	2.20%	801	2.47%	20,016	61.66%	32,461
Wayne	953	77.80%	202	16.49%	58	4.73%	12	0.98%	751	61.31%	1,225
Weber	39,254	62.56%	19,890	31.70%	2,371	3.78%	1,227	1.96%	19,364	30.86%	62,742
Totals	515,096	66.83%	203,053	26.34%	35,850	4.65%	16,755	2.17%	312,043	40.49%	770,754

===== Counties that flipped from Democratic to Republican =====
- Carbon (Largest city: Price)
- Summit (Largest city: Park City)
- Tooele (Largest city: Tooele)

==== By congressional district ====
Bush won all three congressional districts, including one held by a Democrat.

District	Bush	Gore	Representative
1st	72%	22%	James V. Hansen
2nd	57%	34%	Merrill Cook
2nd	57%	34%	Jim Matheson
3rd	72%	23%	Chris Cannon

== Electors ==
Technically the voters of Utah cast their ballots for electors: representatives to the Electoral College. Utah is allocated five electors because it has three congressional districts and two senators. All candidates who appear on the ballot or qualify to receive write-in votes must submit a list of five electors, who pledge to vote for their candidate and their running mate. Whoever wins the majority of votes in the state is awarded all five electoral votes. Their chosen electors then vote for president and vice president. Although electors are pledged to their candidate and running mate, they are not obligated to vote for them. An elector who votes for someone other than their candidate is known as a faithless elector.

The electors of each state and the District of Columbia met on December 18, 2000 to cast their votes for president and vice president. The Electoral College itself never meets as one body. Instead the electors from each state and the District of Columbia met in their respective capitols.

The following were the members of the Electoral College from the state. All were pledged to and voted for George W. Bush and Dick Cheney:

1. Michael Leavitt
2. Olene Walker
3. Lewis Billings
4. Arlene Ellis
5. Ron Fox

== See also ==
- United States presidential elections in Utah
- Presidency of George W. Bush
