= Castle Rock, Utah =

Castle Rock
- Ghost town
- Location within Utah Location within the United States
- Coordinates: 41°07′28″N 111°11′15″W
- Country: United States
- State: Utah
- County: Summit
- Founded: 1860

Castle Rock, also known as "Frenchies", is a ghost town in Summit County, Utah, United States. The location is currently the site of an automotive junk yard. Some buildings, such as the town's gas station, still stand.

== History ==
The area was first used as a campsite in 1847 by Brigham Young and his followers emigrating during the Mormon Trail from Nauvoo, Illinois.

Castle Rock was founded in 1860 when Head of Echo Canyon, also known as "Frenchies", a Pony Express station was built in what is now Summit County. The town of Castle Rock grew around the station as families settled there, hoping to trade with travelers and in 1872, a school was built and functioned until 1937. The original log structure of the station closed in 1867 and was purchased by a French trapper, who moved it a mile away from its current site. Nothing remains of the original Head of Echo Canyon station. In 1872, it became a stop for the Union Pacific Railroad, and was temporarily inhabited by the David Rees and David Moore families. The site of Castle Rock is now home to an automobile junk yard and is private property.
