= Jackson, Utah =

- Ghost town
- Location within the state of Utah Jackson (the United States)
- Coordinates: 41°19′00″N 113°38′34″W
- Country: United States
- State: Utah
- County: Box Elder
- Time zone: UTC-7 (Mountain (MST))
  - Summer (DST): UTC-6 (MDT)
- GNIS feature ID: 1437987

Jackson is a ghost town in the western desert of Box Elder County, Utah, United States. It lies on the western end of the Lucin Cutoff, just west of the Great Salt Lake. Jackson was never much more than a railroad siding, named by the railroad for a prospector who operated a mine in the area. On February 19, 1904, during a collision between two Southern Pacific trains, a carload of dynamite exploded, wrecking everything within an 0.5 miles (0.80 km) radius, including the majority of lives within the town of 45. The effects are credited to concussion, although officials at the time were surprised by the disaster's magnitude.
