= Grass Creek, Utah =

Grass Creek
- Ghost town
- Location within Utah Location within the United States
- Coordinates: 40°59′25″N 111°18′55″W
- Country: United States
- State: Utah
- County: Summit
- Established: 1860
- Abandoned: 1940
- Elevation: 6,348 ft (1,935 m)
- GNIS feature ID: 1428345

Grass Creek is a ghost town in Summit County, Utah, United States. Lying some 8 miles (13 km) northeast of Coalville, it was once an important coal mining town. Grass Creek was inhabited circa 1860–1940.

== History ==
After coal was discovered along the Weber River and the town of Coalville founded in 1859, Brigham Young sent more searchers in 1860 to explore further. They discovered other coal beds 10 feet (3.0 m) thick just north over the hill, in Grass Valley Canyon. The Church of Jesus Christ of Latter-day Saints soon opened a coal mine in the canyon. A few miners' families settled around the mine, calling their settlement Grass Creek.

The silver mining boom in the Park City area in the 1870s created a sudden demand for coal. Non-Mormon investors quickly moved in to develop the canyon's mines. The Grass Creek Fuel Company established its own company town at Grass Creek. The company built homes on the north side of the canyon, with the business district on the south. As the population grew, Grass Creek added numerous buildings, from miners' shacks to fine stone homes for mine owners. There was even a Chinatown.

Until 1873 the coal was hauled by ox teams through Parley's Canyon into Salt Lake City. In that year a narrow gauge railway called the Summit County Railroad was built from the Union Pacific Railroad line at Echo through Coalville to Grass Creek. Despite high Union Pacific freight charges, the railroad was still a more efficient way to ship the coal. Then in 1881 the Union Pacific built the standard gauge Echo and Park City Railroad, which paralleled the Summit County Railroad between Echo and Coalville. The branch line from Coalville to Grass Creek became dual gauge, with three rails to carry trains of both gauges. The Union Pacific even operated its own Grass Creek coal mine from 1880–1887. The increasing involvement of the Union Pacific Railroad in the area was troubling to many residents, who saw the company as a predatory monopoly. Grass Creek was completely dependent on its coal mines, which were at the mercy of the railroad. It was commonly believed that the Union Pacific deliberately raised shipping rates and limited the number of coal cars leaving Coalville, in favor of the company's own coal mines in Rock Springs, Wyoming.

Despite its precarious dependence on a single industry, Grass Creek continued to grow through the end of the 19th century. The canyon's activity peaked about 1881–1910. By 1904 there was a school and post office in town, and in 1907 Ogden millionaire David Eccles bought up more than 1,000 acres (4.0 km^{2}; 1.6 sq mi) of the Grass Creek Coal Company's coal fields and established the Union Fuel Company. The population of Grass Creek was recorded as 190 in the 1910 United States census, after which it dropped off considerably.

=== Decline ===
Grass Creek's coal was found in soft clay, and the mines began to fill with water, causing dangerous cave-ins. The cost and risk of mining coal here made it hard to compete with safer mines that yielded better quality coal. By 1921 only two mines remained in operation, but they were still producing about 200 short tons (180 t) per day. By 1931 the only remaining buyer of Grass Creek coal was the cement plant at Croydon. That year the cement plant shut down, and in 1932 the Union Pacific asked permission to abandon the Grass Creek spur line. The coal mines continued a few more years when the cement plant won a contract to supply the construction of Boulder Dam, but the Grass Creek mines and railroad were permanently closed by 1940.

All of Grass Valley Canyon is now privately owned and closed to the public.

== See also ==
- List of ghost towns in Utah
