= Terrace, Utah =

- Ghost town
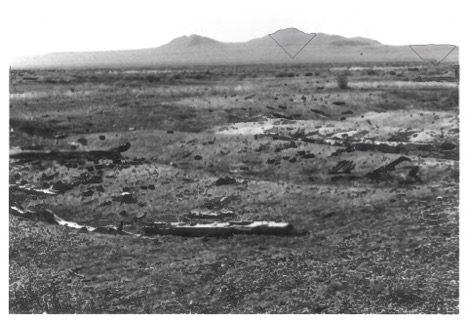
- Looking south at the site of the former Terrance Roundhouse, with Terrace Mountain in the distance, c1980 photograph

- Location within Utah Location within the United States
- Coordinates: 41°30′13″N 113°31′01″W
- Country: United States
- State: Utah
- County: Box Elder
- Founded: 1869
- Abandoned: 1904
- Elevation: 4,551 ft (1,387 m)
- GNIS feature ID: 1438027

Terrace is a ghost town in the Great Salt Lake Desert in west-central Box Elder County, Utah, United States.

== Description ==
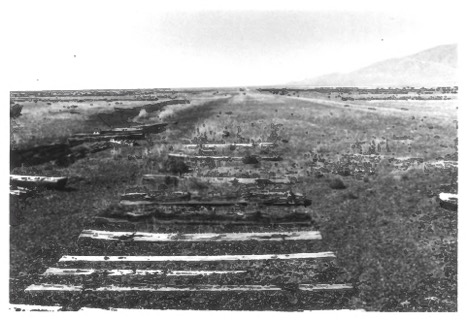
Looking west at the site of the former Terrace Switchyard, c1980 photograph

The town was established April 1, 1869, as a Central Pacific Railroad "division point" (operations base), on the route of the First transcontinental railroad and included a 16-stall roundhouse and an eight-track switchyard. Terrace was dependent on the railroad throughout its history. The town may have had 1,000 people at peak, including a sizeable population of Chinese railway construction workers.

The former town (as well as the nearby Terrace Mountain) was named for the shoreline terraces of the former Lake Bonneville in the area.

== History ==
In 1904 the Southern Pacific Railroad, successor to the Central Pacific, completed the Lucin Cutoff across the Great Salt Lake. The new route bypassed Terrace, and the tracks through town became a little-used branchline. The railroad closed its facilities at Terrace, moving the division point to Montello, Nevada, about 40 miles (64 km) to the west–southwest. The railroad line through Terrace was finally abandoned in 1942. Many of Terrace's houses and buildings were moved to Montello. The cemetery still remains with only three headstones, and only a pile of red bricks and the outline of the turntable is next to the old railroad bed.

The tracks along the grade were removed in 1942. The grade was added to the National Register of Historic Places in 1987, as part of the Central Pacific Railroad Grade Historic District. In 1993 the Bureau of Land Management designated the grade as part of the Transcontinental Railroad Back Country Byway.

== See also ==
- List of ghost towns in Utah

== Additional reading ==
- Carr, Stephen L. (1974). The Historical Guide to Utah Ghost Towns. Salt Lake City: Western Epics. p. 12.
- Hall, Shawn (2002). Connecting The West: Historic Railroad Stops And Stage Stations In Elko County, Nevada. Reno, Nevada: University of Nevada Press. pp. 74–76. ISBN 978-0-87417-499-1.
- Raymond, Anan S.; Fike, Richard E. (1994). Rails East to Promontory: The Utah Stations (The Promontory Branch Stations). Utah Cultural Resource Series No. 8. US Bureau of Land Management.
