= Benmore, Utah =

Ghost town in Utah, United States

Coordinates: 40°00′45″N 112°25′18″W

Benmore is a ghost town in Tooele County, in the U.S. state of Utah.

== History ==
The area was first settled area in 1863. Later, in 1873 the area was known as Petersburg, after Peter Jorgensen, a homesteader in the area.

In 1895, a local resident, Israel Bennion recommended the settlers move closer to Harker Creek. His recommendation was met with rebuttals, but Bennion moved to the new area despite this.

In August 1911, it was found that the Vernon area needed another school, and eventually, the decision was made to build one at the Bennion settlement and, in 1914, the school opened. A post office was established in 1915 and remained in operation until 1935.

In 1914 the Church of Jesus Christ of Later Day Saints organized a branch in the area. A house of worship was set to be constructed but was never completed. The church was the entity that wanted to change the name of the village.

The community's name is an amalgamation of Bennion and Skidmore, the surnames of the families of early settlers.

In 1918, an economic recession hit the community due to poor farming conditions, and many townsfolk moved to Vernon. Later, one of Franklin D. Roosevelt’s New Deal agencies purchased the Benmore land, and in 1954 it was handed over to the Forest Service.

== See also ==
- List of ghost towns in Utah
