= Cedar Creek, Utah =

- Ghost town
- Location within Utah Location within the United States
- Coordinates: 41°57′52″N 113°09′23″W
- Country: United States
- State: Utah
- County: Box Elder
- Founded: 1860s
- Abandoned: 1925
- Named for: Cedar Creek
- Elevation: 5,161 ft (1,573 m)
- GNIS feature ID: 1437519

Cedar Creek is a ghost town in Box Elder County, Utah, United States. Founded in the 1860s, Cedar Creek was a farming town. Businesses included a school, an inn, and a store. The interstate highway system built through Cedar Creek and the nearby communities of Snowville and Park Valley. Cedar Creek was abandoned when weather conditions made farming difficult.

== History ==
Cedar Creek was established in the 1860s as a farming community and was named after a creek that ran north of the town. By the early 20th century, about 20 families lived in Cedar Creek. A school that also served as a church was constructed in town, as was an inn, a service station, and a store. Some activities, including dances, theater performances, and talent shows, were held in the school. The town's mail was delivered to a home rather than to a post office.

When the interstate highway system was developed, it ran from Snowville to Cedar Creek, then to nearby Park Valley. Native Americans were often seen near town, collecting nuts and hunting rabbits. The town's school teacher was considered one of the smartest people in town, and the residents of Cedar Creek often came to her for farming advice. In the 1920s, dry summers and cold winters made farming difficult. People then left town, and by the end of the decade, Cedar Creek was abandoned. Only a few buildings remain today.

== See also ==
- List of ghost towns in Utah
