= 1996 United States presidential election in Utah =

- November 5, 1996
- Turnout: 65.78% (of registered voters)

Nominee	Bob Dole	Bill Clinton	Ross Perot
Party	Republican	Democratic	Reform
Home state	Kansas	Arkansas	Texas
Running mate	Jack Kemp	Al Gore	Pat Choate
Electoral vote	5	0	0
Popular vote	361,911	221,633	66,461
Percentage	54.37%	33.30%	9.98%
County results
Dole
40–50%
50–60%
60–70%
70–80%
Clinton
40–50%
50–60%
President before election
Bill Clinton
Democratic
Elected President
Bill Clinton
Democratic

The 1996 United States presidential election in Utah took place on November 7, 1996, as part of the 1996 United States presidential election. Voters chose five representatives, or electors to the Electoral College, who voted for president and vice president.

Utah was won by Republican nominee Bob Dole, who obtained 54.37 percent of the vote - his highest total in any state - and won by a 21.07 point margin, his highest margin of victory nationwide.

As of the 2024 presidential election, this is the last election in which Tooele and Carbon Counties voted for a Democratic presidential candidate. This also marked the first time since statehood that a president won two terms without ever carrying Utah.

This is the only presidential election in Utah in which fewer votes were cast than in the previous election.

== Results ==
1996 United States presidential election in Utah
Party	Candidate	Votes	%
Republican	Bob Dole	361,911	54.37%
Democratic	Bill Clinton	221,633	33.30%
Reform	Ross Perot	66,461	9.98%
Green	Ralph Nader	4,615	0.69%
Libertarian	Harry Browne	4,129	0.62%
U.S. Taxpayers	Howard Phillips	2,601	0.39%
Independent American	Diane Templin	1,290	0.19%
Independent	A. Peter Crane	1,101	0.17%
Natural Law	John Hagelin	1,085	0.16%
Workers World	Monica Moorehead	298	0.04%
Socialist Workers	James Harris	235	0.04%
Prohibition	Earl Dodge	111	0.02%
Write-in	Mary Cal Hollis	53	0.01%
Write-in	Charles E. Collins	8	0.00%
Write-in	All Others	98	0.01%
Total votes		665,629	100.00%

=== Results by county ===
County	Bob Dole Republican		Bill Clinton Democratic		Ross Perot Reform		Various candidates Other parties		Margin		Total votes cast
County	#	%	#	%	#	%	#	%	#	%	Total votes cast
Beaver	1,164	55.59%	687	32.81%	217	10.36%	26	1.24%	477	22.78%	2,094
Box Elder	8,373	62.65%	3,170	23.72%	1,578	11.81%	244	1.83%	5,203	38.93%	13,365
Cache	16,832	63.77%	6,595	24.99%	2,399	9.09%	568	2.15%	10,237	38.78%	26,394
Carbon	2,343	30.90%	4,172	55.03%	952	12.56%	115	1.52%	-1,829	-24.13%	7,582
Daggett	237	55.63%	131	30.75%	55	12.91%	3	0.70%	106	24.88%	426
Davis	42,768	60.25%	19,301	27.19%	7,495	10.56%	1,417	2.00%	23,467	33.06%	70,981
Duchesne	2,648	63.67%	892	21.45%	566	13.61%	53	1.27%	1,756	42.22%	4,159
Emery	2,033	49.32%	1,371	33.26%	663	16.08%	55	1.33%	662	16.06%	4,122
Garfield	1,330	72.01%	283	15.32%	222	12.02%	12	0.65%	1,047	56.69%	1,847
Grand	1,384	42.57%	1,199	36.88%	432	13.29%	236	7.26%	185	5.69%	3,251
Iron	6,550	69.75%	1,887	20.09%	716	7.62%	238	2.53%	4,663	49.66%	9,391
Juab	1,290	49.12%	928	35.34%	353	13.44%	55	2.09%	362	13.78%	2,626
Kane	1,682	72.63%	304	13.13%	290	12.52%	40	1.73%	1,378	59.50%	2,316
Millard	2,681	63.29%	945	22.31%	505	11.92%	105	2.48%	1,736	40.98%	4,236
Morgan	1,659	57.05%	859	29.54%	337	11.59%	53	1.82%	800	27.51%	2,908
Piute	475	66.25%	176	24.55%	59	8.23%	7	0.98%	299	41.70%	717
Rich	523	65.70%	179	22.49%	88	11.06%	6	0.75%	344	43.21%	796
Salt Lake	127,951	45.51%	117,951	41.95%	27,620	9.82%	7,655	2.72%	10,000	3.56%	281,177
San Juan	2,139	51.36%	1,675	40.22%	271	6.51%	80	1.92%	464	11.14%	4,165
Sanpete	3,631	58.78%	1,568	25.38%	801	12.97%	177	2.87%	2,063	33.40%	6,177
Sevier	4,031	65.79%	1,327	21.66%	670	10.94%	99	1.62%	2,704	44.13%	6,127
Summit	3,867	41.50%	4,177	44.82%	971	10.42%	304	3.26%	-310	-3.32%	9,319
Tooele	3,881	41.68%	3,992	42.87%	1,244	13.36%	195	2.09%	-111	-1.19%	9,312
Uintah	4,743	63.55%	1,714	22.96%	899	12.04%	108	1.45%	3,029	40.59%	7,464
Utah	69,653	71.05%	18,291	18.66%	8,106	8.27%	1,981	2.02%	51,362	52.39%	98,031
Wasatch	2,222	52.38%	1,374	32.39%	558	13.15%	88	2.07%	848	19.99%	4,242
Washington	17,637	70.49%	4,816	19.25%	2,069	8.27%	498	1.99%	12,821	51.24%	25,020
Wayne	741	64.89%	265	23.20%	121	10.60%	15	1.31%	476	41.69%	1,142
Weber	27,443	48.79%	21,404	38.06%	6,204	11.03%	1,191	2.12%	6,039	10.73%	56,242
Totals	361,911	54.37%	221,633	33.30%	66,461	9.98%	15,624	2.35%	140,278	21.07%	665,629

==== Counties that flipped from Democratic to Republican ====
- Grand

==== Counties that flipped from Republican to Democratic ====
- Summit
- Tooele

== Electors ==
Technically the voters of Utah cast their ballots for electors: representatives to the Electoral College. Utah is allocated five electors because it has three congressional districts and two senators. All candidates who appear on the ballot or qualify to receive write-in votes must submit a list of five electors, who pledge to vote for their candidate and their running mate. Whoever wins the majority of votes in the state is awarded all five electoral votes. Their chosen electors then vote for president and vice president. Although electors are pledged to their candidate and running mate, they are not obligated to vote for them. An elector who votes for someone other than their candidate is known as a faithless elector.

The electors of each state and the District of Columbia met in December 1996 to cast their votes for president and vice president. The Electoral College itself never meets as one body. Instead the electors from each state and the District of Columbia met in their respective capitols.

All electors from Utah were pledged to and voted for Bob Dole and Jack Kemp.

== See also ==
- United States presidential elections in Utah
- Presidency of Bill Clinton
