= Matlin, Utah =

- Ghost town
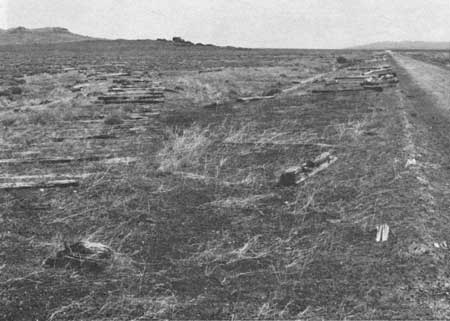
- Looking east at the Matlin siding with the wye in the foreground, unknown date

- Location within Utah Location within the United States
- Coordinates: 41°33′34″N 113°21′32″W
- Country: United States
- State: Utah
- County: Box Elder
- Founded: 1869
- Abandoned: 1904
- Elevation: 4,603 ft (1,403 m)
- GNIS feature ID: 1437996

Matlin is a ghost town in the northeastern end of the Great Salt Lake Desert in western Box Elder County, Utah, United States.

== Description ==
Historical population
Year	Pop.	±%
1870	15	—
1876	25	+66.7%
Source: Source: Rails East to Promontory

The former town was established by the Central Pacific Railroad (CPRR) on April 5, 1869. Chinese railroad workers built a small community and facilities to support the track section. The town relied on the railroad through its entire history. In 1904 the site was abandoned when the Lucin Cutoff was finished. Records indicate that the population was 15 people in 1870 and 25 in 1876. These numbers most likely did not include Chinese residents.

All that is left of the town is the profile in the rail grade of a wye built in 1900.

In June 2020, the Matlin Fire (a lightning caused wildfire, which started June 4) eventually burned about 8,000 acres (3,200 ha) in the area surrounding Matlin. The fire damaged some, and destroyed many other, significant artifacts that had previously remained at the site. In describing the area after the fire, Chris Merritt (a historic preservation officer for the Utah Division of State History) stated, "It just looked like this giant shadow across the land, like driving into Mordor."

== See also ==
- List of ghost towns in Utah
- Central Pacific Railroad Grade Historic District
