= Scranton, Utah =

Scranton
- Ghost town
- Location within Utah Location within the United States
- Coordinates: 40°2′56″N 112°12′3″W
- Country: United States
- State: Utah
- County: Tooele
- Established: 1908
- Abandoned: c. 1918
- Named for: Scranton, Pennsylvania

Scranton is a ghost town in Tooele County, Utah, United States. Located in Barlow Canyon near the Juab County line, it was a short-lived mining town. Scranton has been uninhabited for over a century, but some of its structures have survived relatively intact.

== History ==
Scranton was founded in 1908 around the New Bullion Mine, a lead and zinc mine. It was part of the North Tintic Mining District, organized in 1902 for the area's silver, lead, and zinc mines. The new town became the home of the Scranton Mining and Smelting Company, the owners naming it after Scranton, Pennsylvania, their home town.

Some 90 miners lived in Scranton, a few with families. The town included homes, a boarding house, general store/post office, and assay office. The large pocket of good ore at the New Bullion lasted only about two years, and the town began to dwindle. Then in October 1914 a new company called the South Scranton was organized, and miners dug a long tunnel in search of other mineral resources. During World War I Scranton produced tungsten, sending it by insured parcel post due to its scarcity. After the war the town quickly emptied.

Four old buildings remained in fine condition as late as 1971, when a brush fire ignited by a National Guard exercise burned two of them to the ground. The other two buildings have since collapsed or burned. Some old mine equipment and several adits continue to mark the site of old Scranton.

== See also ==
- List of ghost towns in Utah
- Tintic Standard Reduction Mill
