= Hardup, Utah =

- Ghost town
- Location within Utah Location within the United States
- Coordinates: 41°53′44″N 113°09′06″W
- Country: United States
- State: Utah
- County: Box Elder
- Elevation: 5,046 ft (1,538 m)
- GNIS feature ID: 1437582

Hardup is a ghost town in Box Elder County, Utah, United States.

A Utah cartoonist has joked that the settlement "was apparently named by some cowboy without a girlfriend".
