= Bullion, Utah =

Ghost town in Utah

- Unincorporated community
- Location within Utah Location within the United States
- Coordinates: 38°24′34″N 112°20′18″W
- Country: United States
- State: Utah
- County: Piute
- Elevation: 5,919 ft (1,804 m)
- Time zone: UTC-7 (Mountain (MST))
  - Summer (DST): UTC-6 (MDT)
- GNIS feature ID: 1439306

Bullion is a ghost town in Piute County, Utah, United States. This town produced gold and silver.

== History ==
In 1868, the Ohio Mining District was established.

At its peak, the town had more than 1,600 residents, about 500 active miners, 13 saloons, nine gambling houses, five warehouses, and a school.

In 1880, Bullion has 1,651 residents.

== See also ==
- List of ghost towns in Utah
