= Zaqistan =

Micronation in North America

Coordinates: 41.440230°N 113.42721°W

Republic of Zaqistan
- Micronation (unrecognized entity)
- Claimed by: Zaq Landsberg
- Dates claimed: November 19, 2005–present
- Website www.zaqart.com/zaqistan/zaqistan.shtml

Zaqistan, officially the Republic of Zaqistan, is a micronation in Box Elder County, Utah, created in 2005 by self-declared president Zaq Landsberg. The land has no residents or buildings on it, although Landsberg and volunteers have installed monuments and a border patrol gate, and he refers to the money sent yearly to the State of Utah for the property not as taxes but instead a "tribute" which he pays to maintain peaceful foreign relations. Its state department does not accept applications for citizenship, though previously it was granted for free to anyone who asked, with the option of a passport for a suggested fee of US$50.

Landsberg, a sculptor who lives in Brooklyn, won the land in an eBay auction for the minimum bid of $610 in July 2005. Its size has been variously described as 2 acres (8,090 m^{2}) and 4 acres. The nearest town is Montello, Nevada, about 60 miles (100 km) away.

== See also ==
- List of micronations
