= Summit County, Utah =

County in Utah, United States

- County
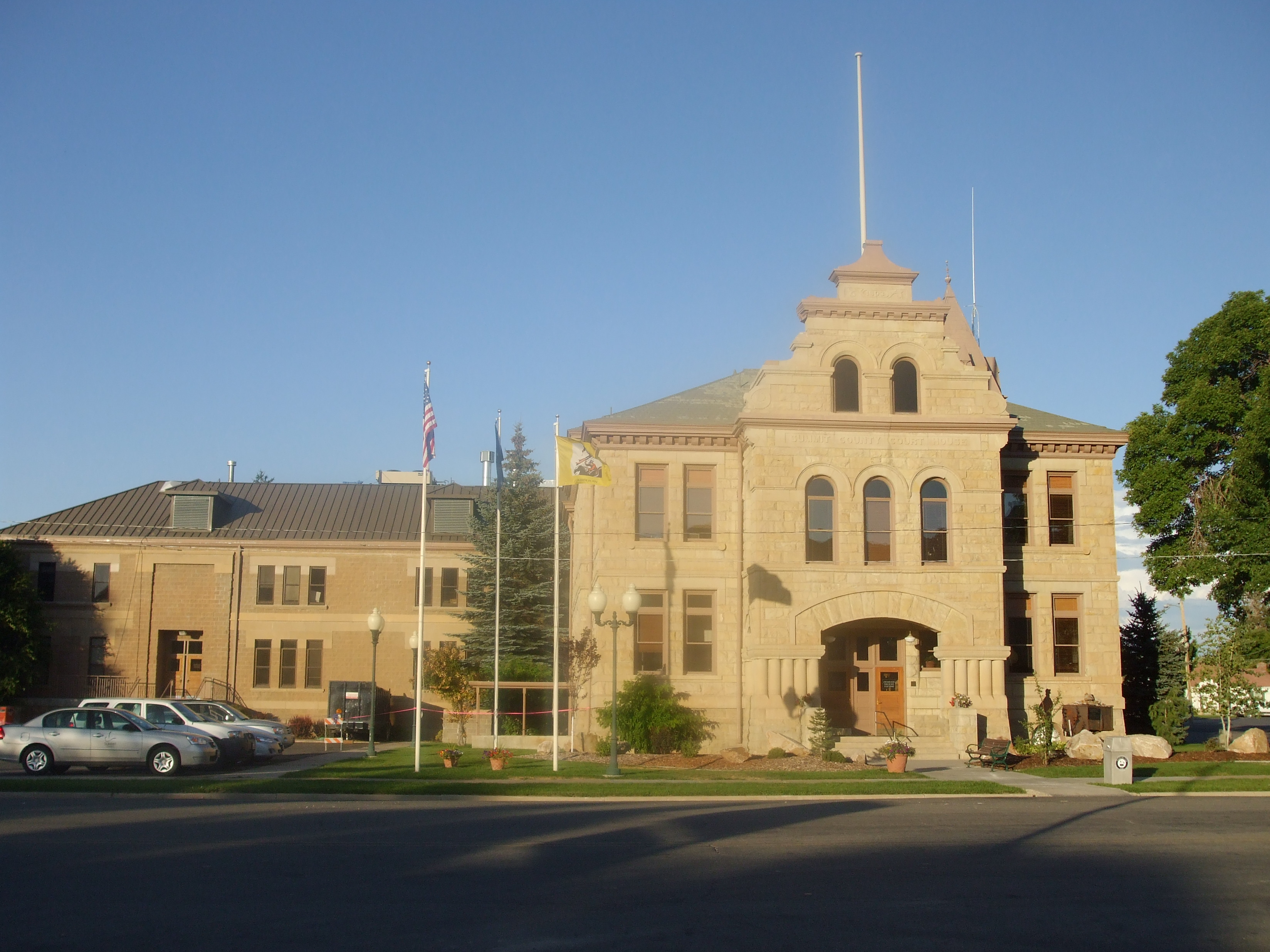
- Summit County Courthouse in Coalville

- Location within the U.S. state of Utah
- Coordinates: 40.88°N 110.97°W
- Country: United States
- State: Utah
- Founded: 1854 (created); 1861 (organized)
- Named for: The summits of the mountains
- Seat: Coalville
- Largest city: Park City

Area
  - Total: 1,882 sq mi (4,870 km^{2})
  - Land: 1,872 sq mi (4,850 km^{2})
  - Water: 10 sq mi (26 km^{2}) 0.5%

Population (2020)
  - Total: 42,357
  - Estimate (2025): 43,141 ▲
  - Density: 22.63/sq mi (8.736/km^{2})
- Time zone: UTC−7 (Mountain)
  - Summer (DST): UTC−6 (MDT)
- Congressional districts: 1st, 3rd
- Website: www.summitcountyutah.gov

Summit County is a county in the U.S. state of Utah, occupying a rugged and mountainous area. As of the 2020 United States census, the population was 42,357. Its county seat is Coalville, and the largest city is Park City.

== History ==
The county was created by the Utah Territory legislature on January 13, 1854, with its description containing a portion of the future state of Wyoming. It was not organized then but was attached to Great Salt Lake County for administrative and judicial purposes. The county government was completed by March 4, 1861, so its attachment to the other county was terminated. The county boundaries were altered in 1856 and in 1862. In 1868 the Wyoming Territory was created by the US government, effectively de-annexing all Summit County areas falling within the new territory. The boundaries were further altered in 1872 and 1880. Its final alteration occurred on January 7, 1918, when Daggett's creation took a portion of its eastern territory. Its boundary has remained unchanged since that creation. It is so named because it includes 39 of the highest mountain peaks in Utah.

The county's mean elevation is 8,388 feet (2,557 m) above sea level, which is the second-highest (after Taos County, New Mexico) of any county outside Colorado. Owing to its proximity to Salt Lake City, Park City has acquired a reputation as an upscale getaway, bringing new development to the area.

Summit County is part of the Heber, UT Micropolitan Statistical Area, which is also included in the Salt Lake City-Provo-Orem, UT Combined Statistical Area.

== Geography ==
Summit County lies on the upper east side of Utah. Its northeast borders abut Wyoming's southern and western borders. Its central and eastern portion consists largely of the east–west oriented Uinta Mountains, while its western portion runs to the east slopes of the north–south oriented Wasatch Mountains. The county's highest point is Gilbert Peak, on the border with Duchesne County, at 13,448 ft (4,099 m) ASL. The county has an area of 1,882 square miles (4,870 km^{2}), of which 1,872 square miles (4,850 km^{2}) is land and 10 square miles (26 km^{2}) (0.5%) is water.

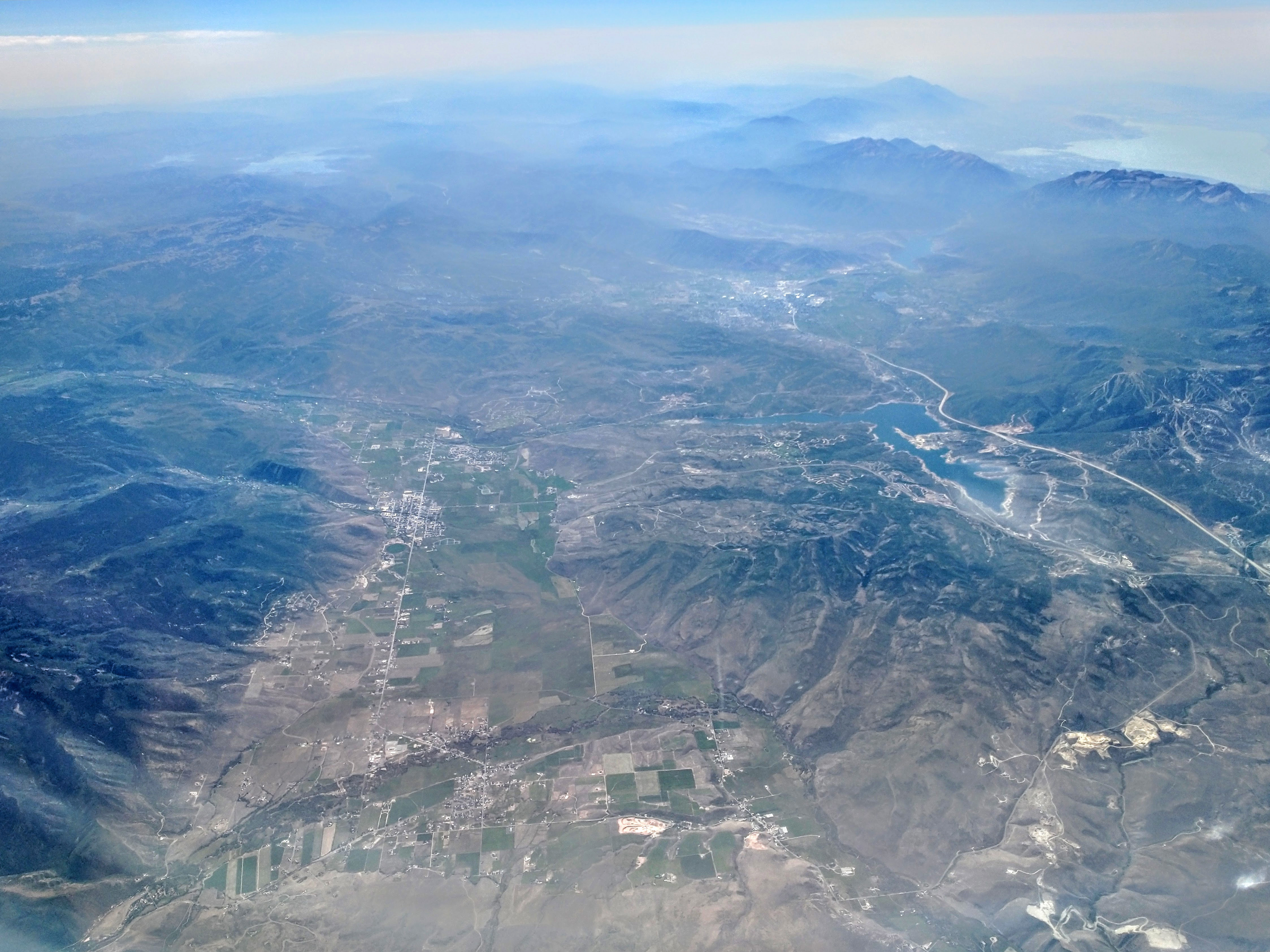
View looking south of Oakley, Kamas, and Francis. Park City and the Jordanelle Reservoir are towards the upper right

=== Major highways ===
- Interstate 80
- Interstate 84
- U.S. Route 40
- U.S. Route 189
- Utah State Route 32
- Utah State Route 150
- Utah State Route 224
- Utah State Route 248

=== Adjacent counties ===
- Rich County - north
- Uinta County, Wyoming - northeast
- Sweetwater County, Wyoming - northeast
- Daggett County - east
- Duchesne County - southeast
- Wasatch County - south
- Salt Lake County - southwest
- Morgan County - northwest
- Salt Lake County - west

=== Protected areas ===
- Ashley National Forest (part)
- Henefer-Echo Wildlife Management Area
- Rockport State Park
- Wasatch National Forest (part)

=== Lakes ===
- Abes Lake
- Adax Lake
- Alexander Lake
- Alligator Lake
- Allsop Lake
- Amethyst Lake
- Anchor Lake
- Azure Lake
- Baker Lake
- Bald Lake
- Ball and Moore Reservoir
- Barker Reservoir
- Bear Lake
- Beaver Lake (near Coffin Lake)
- Beaver Lake (near Duck Lake)
- Beaver Lake (near Whitney Reservoir)
- Beaver Meadow Reservoir
- Bench Lake
- Bennion Lake
- Beth Lake
- Big Elk Lake
- Blue Lake (near Boyer Lake)
- Blue Lake (near Haystack Lake)
- Bobs Lake
- Bourbon Lake
- Boyer Lake
- Bridger Lake
- Buckeye Lake
- Burnt Fork Lake
- Castle Lake (near Lake Blanchard)
- Castle Lake (near Shingle Creek Lakes)
- Chappell Lake
- China Lake
- Clegg Lake
- Cliff Lake (near Lake Blanchard)
- Cliff Lake (near Trial Lake)
- Clyde Lake
- Coffin Lake
- Crystal Lake
- Cuberant Lake
- Cutthroat Lake (near Island Lake)
- Cutthroat Lake (near Teal Lake)
- Dead Horse Lake
- Dean Lake
- Diamond Lake
- Dine Lake
- Dollar Lake
- Duck Lake (near Bald Lake)
- Duck Lake (near Fire Lake)
- East Red Castle Lake
- Echo Reservoir
- Elizabeth Lake
- Elkhorn Reservoir
- Erickson Lakes
  - North Erickson Lake
  - South Erickson Lake
- Fir Lake
- Fire Lake
- Fish Lake (near Burnt Fork Lake)
- Fish Lake (near Lyman Lake)
- Fish Lake (near Sand Lake)
- Gendy Lake
- Gilbert Lake
- Grahams Reservoir (part)
- Grass Lake
- Grassy Lakes
- Hayden Lake
- Haystack Lake
- Hell Hole Lake
- Henrys Fork Lake
- Hidden Lake (near Dine Lake)
- Hidden Lake (near Peter Lake)
- Hidden Lake (near Pot Reservoir)
- Hidden Lake (near Spirit Lake)
- Hidden Lake (near Tamarack Lake)
- Hidden Lake (near Smith and Morehouse Reservoir)
- Hoop Lake
- Hope Lake
- Hourglass Lake
- Ibantik Lake
- Island Lake (near Bennion Lake)
- Island Lake (near Grass Lake)
- Island Lake (near Ramona Lake)
- James Lake
- Jean Lake
- Jerry Lake
- Jessen Lake
- Jewel Lake
- John Lake
- Joyce Lake
- Kabell Lakes
- Kamas Lake
- Kermsuh Lake
- Lake Blanchard
- Lake Ejod
- Lake Hessie
- Lake Lorena
- Lake Marion
- Liberty Lake
- Lilly Lake
- Lily Lake
- Lily Lakes (aka Montgomery Lakes)
- Lily Pad Lake
- Linear Lake
- Little Elk Lake
- Little Lyman Lake
- Lofty Lake
- Long Lake
- Lost Lake (near Lilly Lake)
- Lost Lake (near Tamarack Lake)
- Lovenia Lake
- Lower Red Castle Lake
- Lower Yellow Pine Lake
- Lym Lake
- Lyman Lake
- Marjorie Lake
- Marsh Lake
- McPheters Lake
- Meadow Lake
- Meeks Cabin Reservoir (part)
- Moslander Reservoir
- Naomi Lake
- Norice Lake
- Notch Lake (Cliff Lake)
- Olsen Lake
- Ostler Lake
- Peter Lake
- Petit Lake
- Picturesque Lake
- Ponds Lake
- Porcupine Reservoir
- Pot Reservoir
- Priord Lake
- Quarter Corner Lake
- Ramona Lake
- Red Castle Lake
- Red Pine Lake
- Reids Lake
- Rhoads Lake
- Rock Lake
- Rockport Reservoir
- Round Lake
- Ruth Lake
- Ryder Lake
- Salamander Lake
- Salt Fish Lake
- Sand Lake
- Sargent Lake
- Sargent Lakes
  - Sargent Number One Reservoir
- Sawmill Lake
- Scow Lake
- Shadow Lake (near Park City)
- Shadow Lake (near Tail Lake)
- Shallow Lake
- Shingle Creek Lakes
  - East Shingle Creek Lake
  - Lower Shingle Creek Lake
  - West Shingle Creek Lake
- Shingle Mill Lake
- Shoestring Lake
- Smith and Morehouse Reservoir
- Smiths Fork Pass Lake
- Spectacle Lake
- Spirit Lake (part)
- Star Lake
- Stateline Reservoir
- Tail Lake
- Tamarack Lake
- Teal Lake
- Teapot Lake (aka Lost Lake Number 2)
- Three Divide Lakes
  - Booker Lake
  - Divide Lake 1
  - Divide Lake 2
- Toomset Lake
- Trial Lake
- Trident Lake
- Twin Lakes
  - North Twin Lake
  - South Twin Lake
- Upper Red Castle Lake
- Upper Yellow Pine Lake
- Wall Lake
- Washington Lake
- Watson Lake
- Weir Reservoir
- Whiskey Island Lake
- White Pine Lake
- Whitney Reservoir

== Demographics ==
Historical population
Census	Pop.	Note	%±
1860	198		—
1870	2,512		1,168.7%
1880	4,921		95.9%
1890	7,733		57.1%
1900	9,439		22.1%
1910	8,200		−13.1%
1920	7,862		−4.1%
1930	9,527		21.2%
1940	8,714		−8.5%
1950	6,745		−22.6%
1960	5,673		−15.9%
1970	5,879		3.6%
1980	10,198		73.5%
1990	15,518		52.2%
2000	29,736		91.6%
2010	36,324		22.2%
2020	42,357		16.6%
2025 (est.)	43,141	▲	1.9%
US Decennial Census; 1790–1960 1900–1990; 1990–2000 2010–2020

=== 2020 census ===
According to the 2020 United States census and 2020 American Community Survey, there were 42,357 people in Summit County with a population density of 22.6 people per square mile (8.7/km^{2}). Among non-Hispanic or Latino people, the racial makeup was 35,108 (82.9%) White, 163 (0.4%) African American, 67 (0.2%) Native American, 723 (1.7%) Asian, 42 (0.1%) Pacific Islander, 155 (0.4%) from other races, and 1,362 (3.2%) from two or more races. 4,737 (11.2%) people were Hispanic or Latino.

Summit County, Utah – Racial and ethnic composition Note: the US Census treats Hispanic/Latino as an ethnic category. This table excludes Latinos from the racial categories and assigns them to a separate category. Hispanics/Latinos may be of any race.
Race / Ethnicity (NH = Non-Hispanic)	Pop 2000	Pop 2010	Pop 2020	% 2000	% 2010	% 2020
White alone (NH)	26,608	31,012	35,108	89.48%	85.38%	82.89%
Black or African American alone (NH)	54	110	163	0.18%	0.30%	0.38%
Native American or Alaska Native alone (NH)	76	89	67	0.26%	0.25%	0.16%
Asian alone (NH)	283	440	723	0.95%	1.21%	1.71%
Pacific Islander alone (NH)	13	31	42	0.04%	0.09%	0.10%
Other race alone (NH)	28	60	155	0.09%	0.17%	0.37%
Mixed race or Multiracial (NH)	268	392	1,362	0.90%	1.08%	3.22%
Hispanic or Latino (any race)	2,406	4,190	4,737	8.09%	11.54%	11.18%
Total	29,736	36,324	42,357	100.00%	100.00%	100.00%

There were 21,578 (50.94%) males and 20,779 (49.06%) females, and the population distribution by age was 10,351 (24.4%) under the age of 18, 26,149 (61.7%) from 18 to 64, and 5,857 (13.8%) who were at least 65 years old. The median age was 40.8 years.

There were 15,688 households in Summit County with an average size of 2.70 of which 11,419 (72.8%) were families and 4,269 (27.2%) were non-families. Among all families, 9,553 (60.9%) were married couples, 671 (4.3%) were male householders with no spouse, and 1,195 (7.6%) were female householders with no spouse. Among all non-families, 3,171 (20.2%) were a single person living alone and 1,098 (7.0%) were two or more people living together. 5,424 (34.6%) of all households had children under the age of 18. 12,186 (77.7%) of households were owner-occupied while 3,502 (22.3%) were renter-occupied.

The median income for a Summit County household was $106,973 and the median family income was $119,592, with a per-capita income of $57,308. The median income for males that were full-time employees was $69,357 and for females $50,147. 4.5% of the population and 2.7% of families were below the poverty line.

In terms of education attainment, out of the 27,924 people in Summit County 25 years or older, 1,332 (4.8%) had not completed high school, 4,476 (16.0%) had a high school diploma or equivalency, 6,446 (23.1%) had some college or associate degree, 9,841 (35.2%) had a bachelor's degree, and 5,829 (20.9%) had a graduate or professional degree.

=== Religion ===
According to a 2000 survey by the Association of Statisticians of American Religious Bodies, Summit County is more religiously diverse than the rest of Utah. Roughly two-in-five people (44.2%) of the population claim no religion at all. 36.8% are members of the Church of Jesus Christ of Latter-day Saints (LDS Church) (compared with some 66% statewide) and 10.6% are Catholic.

== Politics and government ==
Summit County was a Republican stronghold in the decades following World War II. Beginning in the 1990s, it became more competitive due to the influence of Democratic-leaning Park City, with Democrats sometimes winning a plurality or majority of the countywide vote. In 1996, Bill Clinton became the first Democratic presidential nominee to win the county since Lyndon Johnson's 44-state landslide in 1964 and only the second Democrat to carry it since Franklin D. Roosevelt. George W. Bush carried the county in 2000 and 2004, but his performance there was worst in the state. In the 2006 Senate race, Summit County was the only county carried by Democrat Pete Ashdown even as the Republican incumbent Orrin Hatch carried the state as a whole by a 2 to 1 margin. Likewise, in the 2008 U.S. presidential election, Barack Obama carried the county by a 15.3% margin over John McCain, while McCain carried Utah by 28.1%. In the 2012 presidential election, Republican Mitt Romney defeated Obama in the county, 50% to 46%. In 2016, Democrat Hillary Clinton defeated Republican Donald Trump, 50% to 35%, and Joe Biden increased her margin by 3% in 2020, solidifying the county as a safe Democratic region.

State elected offices
Position	District	Name	Affiliation	First elected
Senate	19	John D. Johnson	Republican	2020
Senate	26	Ronald Winterton	Republican	2018
House of Representatives	28	Brian King	Democrat	2008
House of Representatives	53	Kera Birkeland	Republican	2020
House of Representatives	54	Mike Kohler	Republican	2020
Board of Education	7	Carol Lear	Democrat	2016
Board of Education	12	James Moss Jr.	Republican	2020

United States presidential election results for Summit County, Utah
Year	Republican		Democratic		Third party(ies)	
Year	No.	%	No.	%	No.	%
1896	245	6.72%	3,402	93.28%	0	0.00%
1900	1,555	46.64%	1,763	52.88%	16	0.48%
1904	2,232	57.87%	1,358	35.21%	267	6.92%
1908	1,614	50.87%	1,402	44.19%	157	4.95%
1912	1,290	44.06%	983	33.57%	655	22.37%
1916	1,195	40.69%	1,495	50.90%	247	8.41%
1920	1,503	59.79%	874	34.77%	137	5.45%
1924	1,597	57.16%	825	29.53%	372	13.31%
1928	1,748	57.65%	1,260	41.56%	24	0.79%
1932	1,434	40.55%	2,028	57.35%	74	2.09%
1936	1,422	37.58%	2,344	61.95%	18	0.48%
1940	1,730	43.82%	2,215	56.10%	3	0.08%
1944	1,479	45.62%	1,761	54.32%	2	0.06%
1948	1,617	50.44%	1,556	48.53%	33	1.03%
1952	1,955	60.75%	1,263	39.25%	0	0.00%
1956	2,031	69.77%	880	30.23%	0	0.00%
1960	1,607	56.91%	1,217	43.09%	0	0.00%
1964	1,335	47.14%	1,497	52.86%	0	0.00%
1968	1,782	62.37%	961	33.64%	114	3.99%
1972	2,209	69.95%	836	26.47%	113	3.58%
1976	2,316	61.55%	1,282	34.07%	165	4.38%
1980	3,330	65.38%	1,184	23.25%	579	11.37%
1984	4,093	71.79%	1,539	27.00%	69	1.21%
1988	3,881	59.68%	2,536	39.00%	86	1.32%
1992	3,133	33.33%	3,013	32.06%	3,253	34.61%
1996	3,867	41.50%	4,177	44.82%	1,275	13.68%
2000	6,168	50.89%	4,601	37.96%	1,352	11.15%
2004	7,936	51.83%	6,977	45.57%	399	2.61%
2008	6,956	41.11%	9,532	56.34%	432	2.55%
2012	8,884	50.49%	8,072	45.87%	641	3.64%
2016	7,333	35.11%	10,503	50.29%	3,049	14.60%
2020	10,252	39.30%	15,244	58.43%	592	2.27%
2024	10,783	41.67%	14,612	56.47%	481	1.86%

In the 2016 Senate race, Summit County was the only county in Utah where a plurality voted for Democratic nominee Misty Snow against Republican incumbent Mike Lee. Snow was the first major-party transgender Senate candidate in United States history, making the county the first in the nation to vote for a transgender candidate for the Senate.

On the county level, most of the elected offices are held by Democrats, including four of the five seats on the newly created Summit County Council. John Hanrahan, D; Claudia McMullin, D; Sally Elliott, D; Chris Robinson, D; David Ure, R.

Summit County was one of only two counties (along with Grand County) to vote against Utah's same-sex marriage ban in 2004. In June 2010, Summit County became the sixth local government of Utah to prohibit discrimination in employment or housing based on a person's sexual orientation or gender identity.

== Communities ==
=== Cities ===
- Coalville (county seat)
- Francis
- Kamas
- Oakley
- Park City

=== Towns ===
- Henefer

=== Census-designated places ===
- East Basin
- Echo
- Hoytsville
- Marion
- Peoa
- Samak
- Silver Summit
- Snyderville
- Summit Park
- Wanship
- Woodland

=== Unincorporated communities ===
- Alpine Acres
- Bountiful Peak Summer Home Area
- Castle Rock
- Christmas Meadows Summer Home Area
- Emory
- Grass Creek
- Holiday Park
- Monviso
- Rockport
- Uintalands
- Upton
- Weber Canyon
- West Hills

=== Former communities ===
- Atkinson
- Blacks Fork
- Mill City
- Wahsatch

== Education ==
There are three school districts covering sections of the county:

- North Summit School District
- Park City School District
- South Summit School District

Summit County also includes a local campus of Utah State University in Park City.

== See also ==
- List of counties in Utah
- National Register of Historic Places listings in Summit County, Utah
- Utah Transfer of Public Lands Act
