= Lucin, Utah =

- Ghost town
- Location within Utah Location within the United States
- Coordinates: 41°20′54″N 113°54′18″W
- Country: United States
- State: Utah
- County: Box Elder
- Founded: Late 19th century
- Abandoned: 1990s
- Named for: Lucina subanta
- Elevation: 4,478 ft (1,365 m)
- GNIS feature ID: 1437627

Lucin (also known as Umbria Junction) is a small railroad community in Box Elder County, Utah, United States, located along the western side of the Great Salt Lake, 162 miles (261 km) northwest of Salt Lake City. Abandoned in 1936 by its original occupants, the community was resettled by four retired railroad workers and their families from 1937 until 1972, and again by four owner-residents in the 1990s.

== History ==
Lucin was founded in the late 19th century, about 1 mile (1.6 km) north of its current location, to provide a water stop for railroads to replenish their steam locomotives. It is considered an "oasis in the desert", and is an important stop for songbirds migrating to and from places such as Canada, Mexico, and South America.

The town was moved in 1903 to serve as a stop for the Lucin Cutoff. Historically, the town's population consisted mainly of employees of the Central and Southern Pacific Railroads. In 1936 the town was abandoned, and then resettled by a group of four retired railroad workers and their children from 1937–1972.

For a while, no one lived in Lucin, until 1997 when Ivo Zdarsky, an aviation entrepreneur and manufacturer of the Ivoprop, a plane propeller, bought it and moved there.

The area is managed for migrating songbirds and other wildlife by the Utah Division of Wildlife Resources.

The town was named for a local fossil, the bivalve Lucina subanta.

== Lucin today ==
As of 2016, except for the intermittent (more permanent since 2008) presence of Zdarsky, one of the four property owners and avid solitary explorer, and his IVOPROP Corp research and development activities, Lucin is a ghost town. As of 2016, the most prominent town features were a recent airplane hangar doubling as a residence and a workshop, an adjacent unpaved landing strip, along with several smaller, separate utility buildings (water, fuel, telecommunications, power).

The Lucin area is a popular stop for rockhounds looking for an apple-green, chert-like phosphate mineral variscite, also known as utahlite and lucinite.

Nearby is a large artwork called the Sun Tunnels, which was created by artist Nancy Holt in 1976.

== Climate ==
According to the Köppen Climate Classification system, Lucin has a semi-arid climate, abbreviated "BSk" on climate maps.

== See also ==
- List of ghost towns in Utah
