= Homansville, Utah =

Ghost town in Utah County, Utah, United States

Homansville
- Ghost town
- Location within Utah Location within the United States
- Coordinates: 39°58′29.82″N 112°5′2.80″W
- Country: United States
- State: Utah
- County: Utah
- GNIS feature ID: 1437590

Homansville is a ghost town in Utah County, Utah, United States. It's was settled in 1872.

The town was abandoned before 1900.

A post office operated from 1873 to 1887.

== Name ==
The town was named after Sheppard Homans.

== Population ==
The town had nearly 300 residents. Today, no one lives here.

== Geography ==
It is situated two miles northeast of Eureka.
