= Rosette, Utah =

Unincorporated community in the state of Utah, United States

- Unincorporated community
- Location of Rosette within the State of Utah Rosette (the United States)
- Coordinates: 41°49′07″N 113°24′47″W
- Country: United States
- State: Utah
- County: Box Elder
- Named for: Wild roses
- Elevation: 5,686 ft (1,733 m)
- Time zone: UTC-7 (Mountain (MST))
  - Summer (DST): UTC-6 (MDT)
- ZIP codes: 84329
- Area code: 435
- GNIS feature ID: 1445146

Rosette is an unincorporated ranching community in northwestern Box Elder County, Utah, United States.

Historical population
Census	Pop.	Note	%±
1920	100		—
1930	77		−23.0%
1940	86		11.7%
1950	68		−20.9%
Source: U.S. Census Bureau

== Description ==
Rosette is located about 4 miles (6.4 km) west of Park Valley, south of the Raft River Mountains.

The community was named by the town's first postmaster, Jonathan Campbell, in 1871. The name refers to the wild roses in the area.

== Climate ==
According to the Köppen Climate Classification system, Rosette has a semi-arid climate, abbreviated "BSk" on climate maps.

Climate data for Rosette, Utah, 1991–2020 normals, extremes 1929–present
Month	Jan	Feb	Mar	Apr	May	Jun	Jul	Aug	Sep	Oct	Nov	Dec	Year
Record high °F (°C)	55 (13)	62 (17)	77 (25)	85 (29)	90 (32)	100 (38)	102 (39)	100 (38)	97 (36)	92 (33)	70 (21)	63 (17)	102 (39)
Mean maximum °F (°C)	46.5 (8.1)	52.3 (11.3)	62.9 (17.2)	73.0 (22.8)	80.8 (27.1)	89.1 (31.7)	95.1 (35.1)	93.5 (34.2)	88.6 (31.4)	76.0 (24.4)	61.6 (16.4)	50.3 (10.2)	95.9 (35.5)
Mean daily maximum °F (°C)	34.6 (1.4)	39.0 (3.9)	47.9 (8.8)	55.0 (12.8)	64.8 (18.2)	75.2 (24.0)	85.7 (29.8)	84.6 (29.2)	74.4 (23.6)	60.3 (15.7)	45.3 (7.4)	34.7 (1.5)	58.5 (14.7)
Daily mean °F (°C)	25.1 (−3.8)	29.2 (−1.6)	37.5 (3.1)	43.9 (6.6)	53.1 (11.7)	62.4 (16.9)	72.3 (22.4)	70.9 (21.6)	61.0 (16.1)	47.8 (8.8)	34.9 (1.6)	25.8 (−3.4)	47.0 (8.3)
Mean daily minimum °F (°C)	15.7 (−9.1)	19.3 (−7.1)	27.0 (−2.8)	32.9 (0.5)	41.4 (5.2)	49.6 (9.8)	58.9 (14.9)	57.3 (14.1)	47.6 (8.7)	35.4 (1.9)	24.5 (−4.2)	16.8 (−8.4)	35.5 (1.9)
Mean minimum °F (°C)	0.9 (−17.3)	4.9 (−15.1)	13.2 (−10.4)	19.4 (−7.0)	25.7 (−3.5)	34.3 (1.3)	46.8 (8.2)	44.2 (6.8)	31.3 (−0.4)	19.9 (−6.7)	8.3 (−13.2)	−0.2 (−17.9)	−4.2 (−20.1)
Record low °F (°C)	−26 (−32)	−21 (−29)	2 (−17)	5 (−15)	14 (−10)	27 (−3)	35 (2)	31 (−1)	20 (−7)	2 (−17)	−11 (−24)	−24 (−31)	−26 (−32)
Average precipitation inches (mm)	1.18 (30)	0.92 (23)	0.84 (21)	1.10 (28)	1.50 (38)	0.99 (25)	0.82 (21)	0.75 (19)	1.06 (27)	0.87 (22)	0.60 (15)	1.26 (32)	11.89 (302)
Average precipitation days (≥ 0.01 in)	8.1	6.8	6.2	6.9	9.8	5.8	5.4	5.4	5.3	5.1	5.3	8.7	78.8
Source: NOAA
