= 1968 United States presidential election in Utah =

- November 5, 1968
- Turnout: 76.7% (voting age)

| Nominee | Richard Nixon | Hubert Humphrey | George Wallace |
| Party | Republican | Democratic | American Independent |
| Home state | New York (Note: Although he was born in California and he served as a U.S. senator from California, in 1968 Richard Nixon’s official state of residence was New York, because he moved there to practice law after his defeat in the 1962 California gubernatorial election. During his first term as president, Nixon re-established his residency in California. Consequently, most reliable reference books list Nixon's home state as New York in the 1968 election and his home state as California in the 1972 (and 1960) election.) | Minnesota | Alabama |
| Running mate | Spiro Agnew | Edmund Muskie | Curtis LeMay |
| Electoral vote | 4 | 0 | 0 |
| Popular vote | 238,728 | 156,665 | 26,906 |
| Percentage | 56.49% | 37.07% | 6.37% |
County results
Nixon
50–60%
60–70%
70–80%
Humphrey
50–60%
60–70%
President before election
Lyndon B. Johnson
Democratic
Elected President
Richard Nixon
Republican

The 1968 United States presidential election in Utah took place on November 5, 1968, as part of the 1968 United States presidential election. State voters chose four representatives, or electors, to the Electoral College, who voted for president and vice president.

Utah was won by former Vice President Richard Nixon (R–California), with 56.49 percent of the popular vote, against Vice President Hubert Humphrey (D–Minnesota), with 37.07 percent of the popular vote. American Independent Party candidate George Wallace performed decently, finishing with 6.37 percent of the popular vote. By outpolling Humphrey in arch-Republican Kane County, Wallace became the first third-party candidate to finish even second in any non-Southern county since 1936 when William Lemke finished ahead of Alf Landon in the North Dakota counties of Bottineau, Burke, Divide, Mountrail, Towner and Williams.

With 56.49 percent of the popular vote, Utah would prove to be Nixon's third strongest state in the 1968 election after Nebraska and Idaho.

Utah had the highest voter turnout in terms of the voting age population out of any state in the 1968 presidential election.

== Results ==
1968 United States presidential election in Utah
| Party | Candidate | Votes | % |
|---|---|---|---|
| Republican | Richard Nixon | 238,728 | 56.49% |
| Democratic | Hubert Humphrey | 156,665 | 37.07% |
| American Independent | George Wallace | 26,906 | 6.37% |
| Peace and Freedom | Eldridge Cleaver | 180 | 0.04% |
| Socialist Workers | Fred Halstead | 89 | 0.02% |
| Total votes | | 422,568 | 100.00% |

=== Results by county ===
| County | Richard Nixon Republican | | Hubert Humphrey Democratic | | George Wallace American Independent | | Eldridge Cleaver Peace and Freedom | | Fred Halstead Socialist Workers | | Margin | | Total votes cast |
| County | # | % | # | % | # | % | # | % | # | % | # | % | Total votes cast |
|---|---|---|---|---|---|---|---|---|---|---|---|---|---|
| Beaver | 989 | 50.87% | 795 | 40.90% | 158 | 8.13% | 2 | 0.10% | 0 | 0.00% | 194 | 9.97% | 1,944 |
| Box Elder | 7,680 | 65.71% | 3,093 | 26.46% | 907 | 7.76% | 6 | 0.05% | 2 | 0.02% | 4,587 | 39.25% | 11,688 |
| Cache | 11,906 | 68.81% | 4,327 | 25.01% | 1,050 | 6.07% | 17 | 0.10% | 3 | 0.02% | 7,579 | 43.80% | 17,303 |
| Carbon | 2,618 | 36.17% | 4,344 | 60.01% | 271 | 3.74% | 2 | 0.03% | 4 | 0.06% | -1,726 | -23.84% | 7,239 |
| Daggett | 152 | 52.23% | 97 | 33.33% | 42 | 14.43% | 0 | 0.00% | 0 | 0.00% | 55 | 18.90% | 291 |
| Davis | 20,658 | 60.60% | 10,624 | 31.17% | 2,787 | 8.18% | 18 | 0.05% | 0 | 0.00% | 10,034 | 29.43% | 34,087 |
| Duchesne | 1,733 | 61.15% | 858 | 30.28% | 243 | 8.57% | 0 | 0.00% | 0 | 0.00% | 875 | 30.87% | 2,834 |
| Emery | 1,223 | 50.89% | 1,019 | 42.41% | 161 | 6.70% | 0 | 0.00% | 0 | 0.00% | 204 | 8.48% | 2,403 |
| Garfield | 1,033 | 69.47% | 314 | 21.12% | 139 | 9.35% | 0 | 0.00% | 1 | 0.07% | 719 | 48.35% | 1,487 |
| Grand | 1,435 | 60.88% | 707 | 30.00% | 215 | 9.12% | 0 | 0.00% | 0 | 0.00% | 728 | 30.88% | 2,357 |
| Iron | 3,337 | 66.59% | 1,157 | 23.09% | 514 | 10.26% | 2 | 0.04% | 1 | 0.02% | 2,180 | 43.50% | 5,011 |
| Juab | 1,201 | 53.95% | 907 | 40.75% | 118 | 5.30% | 0 | 0.00% | 0 | 0.00% | 294 | 13.20% | 2,226 |
| Kane | 814 | 71.72% | 147 | 12.95% | 174 | 15.33% | 0 | 0.00% | 0 | 0.00% | 640 (Note: In this county where Wallace ran second ahead of Humphrey, the margin given is that between Nixon and Wallace.) | 56.39% | 1,135 |
| Millard | 2,318 | 66.06% | 971 | 27.67% | 220 | 6.27% | 0 | 0.00% | 0 | 0.00% | 1,347 | 38.39% | 3,509 |
| Morgan | 1,020 | 59.89% | 551 | 32.35% | 130 | 7.63% | 1 | 0.06% | 1 | 0.06% | 469 | 27.54% | 1,703 |
| Piute | 411 | 64.42% | 167 | 26.18% | 60 | 9.40% | 0 | 0.00% | 0 | 0.00% | 244 | 38.24% | 638 |
| Rich | 525 | 70.28% | 183 | 24.50% | 39 | 5.22% | 0 | 0.00% | 0 | 0.00% | 342 | 45.78% | 747 |
| Salt Lake | 101,942 | 54.03% | 77,247 | 40.94% | 9,323 | 4.94% | 97 | 0.05% | 54 (Note: These votes were mistakenly assigned to San Juan County in the state's abstract.) | 0.03% | 24,695 | 13.09% | 188,663 |
| San Juan | 1,393 | 59.66% | 680 | 29.12% | 262 | 11.22% | 0 | 0.00% | 0 | 0.00% | 713 | 30.54% | 2,335 |
| Sanpete | 3,304 | 62.20% | 1,696 | 31.93% | 307 | 5.78% | 5 | 0.09% | 0 | 0.00% | 1,608 | 30.27% | 5,312 |
| Sevier | 3,190 | 67.24% | 1,167 | 24.60% | 384 | 8.09% | 1 | 0.02% | 2 | 0.04% | 2,023 | 42.64% | 4,744 |
| Summit | 1,782 | 62.37% | 961 | 33.64% | 113 | 3.96% | 0 | 0.00% | 1 | 0.04% | 821 | 28.73% | 2,857 |
| Tooele | 3,422 | 41.39% | 4,250 | 51.41% | 592 | 7.16% | 3 | 0.04% | 0 | 0.00% | -828 | -10.02% | 8,267 |
| Uintah | 3,034 | 65.64% | 1,145 | 24.77% | 437 | 9.45% | 5 | 0.11% | 1 | 0.02% | 1,889 | 40.87% | 4,622 |
| Utah | 29,226 | 59.01% | 16,629 | 33.57% | 3,666 | 7.40% | 5 | 0.01% | 2 | 0.00% | 12,597 | 25.44% | 49,528 |
| Wasatch | 1,611 | 60.95% | 941 | 35.60% | 86 | 3.25% | 1 | 0.04% | 4 | 0.15% | 670 | 25.35% | 2,643 |
| Washington | 3,226 | 64.52% | 975 | 19.50% | 796 | 15.92% | 1 | 0.02% | 2 | 0.04% | 2,251 | 45.02% | 5,000 |
| Wayne | 511 | 62.85% | 248 | 30.50% | 54 | 6.64% | 0 | 0.00% | 0 | 0.00% | 263 | 32.35% | 813 |
| Weber | 27,034 | 52.82% | 20,465 | 39.98% | 3,658 | 7.15% | 14 | 0.03% | 11 | 0.02% | 6,569 | 12.84% | 51,182 |
| Totals | 238,728 | 56.49% | 156,665 | 37.07% | 26,906 | 6.37% | 180 | 0.04% | 89 | 0.02% | 82,063 | 19.42% | 422,568 |

==== Counties that flipped from Democratic to Republican ====
- Beaver
- Daggett
- Duchesne
- Emery
- Grand
- Juab
- Morgan
- Salt Lake
- Summit
- Utah
- Wayne
- Wasatch
- Weber

=== Results by congressional district ===
This table shows the results by congressional district. The candidate who won the largest amount of the vote nationally is shown first. Nixon won both of the Utah's 2 congressional districts.

| District | Nixon | | Humphrey | | Wallace | |
| District | # | % | # | % | # | % |
|---|---|---|---|---|---|---|
| 1st | 122,293 | 58.81% | 70,363 | 33.84% | 15,185 | 7.30% |
| 2nd | 116,435 | 54.25% | 86,302 | 40.21% | 11,721 | 5.46% |

== See also ==
- United States presidential elections in Utah
