= Box Elder County, Utah =

County in Utah, United States

- County
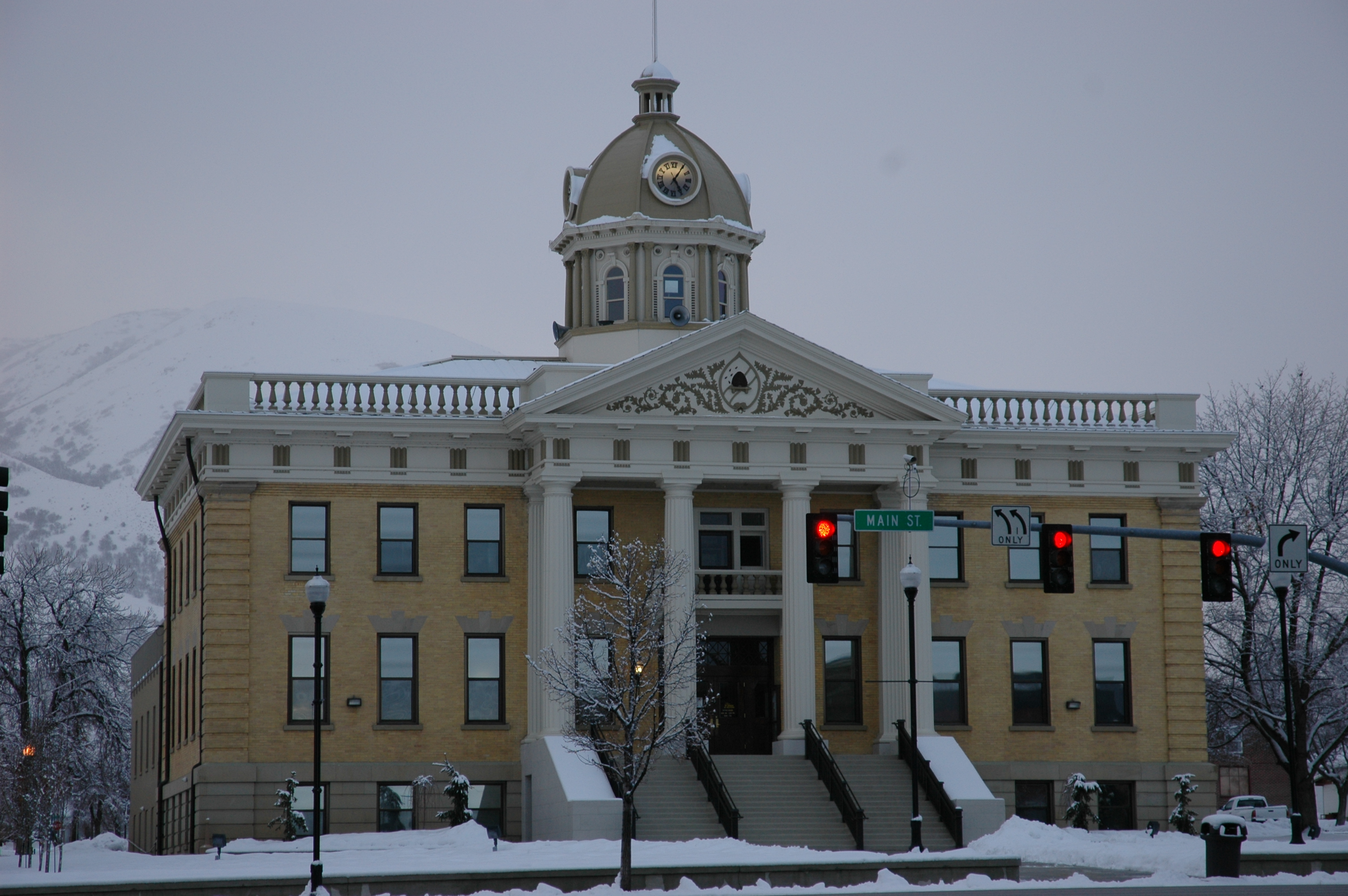
- Box Elder County Courthouse, January 2010

- Logo

- Location within the U.S. state of Utah
- Coordinates: 41.51°N 113.10°W
- Country: United States
- State: Utah
- Founded: January 5, 1856
- Named for: Box elder tree
- Seat: Brigham City
- Largest city: Brigham City

Area
  - Total: 6,729 sq mi (17,430 km^{2})
  - Land: 5,746 sq mi (14,880 km^{2})
  - Water: 934 sq mi (2,420 km^{2}) 15%

Population (2020)
  - Total: 57,666
  - Estimate (2025): 65,320 ▲
  - Density: 10.04/sq mi (3.875/km^{2})
- Time zone: UTC−7 (Mountain)
  - Summer (DST): UTC−6 (MDT)
- Congressional district: 1st
- Website: www.boxeldercountyut.gov

Box Elder County is a county at the northwestern corner of Utah, United States. At the 2020 United States census, the population was 57,666, up from the 2010 figure of 49,975. Its county seat and largest city is Brigham City. The county was named for the box elder trees that abound in the region.

Box Elder County is part of the Ogden–Clearfield metropolitan area, which is also included in the Salt Lake City-Ogden-Clearfield Combined Statistical Area.

Box Elder County is home to two regional campuses of Utah State University (located in Brigham City and Tremonton).

== History ==
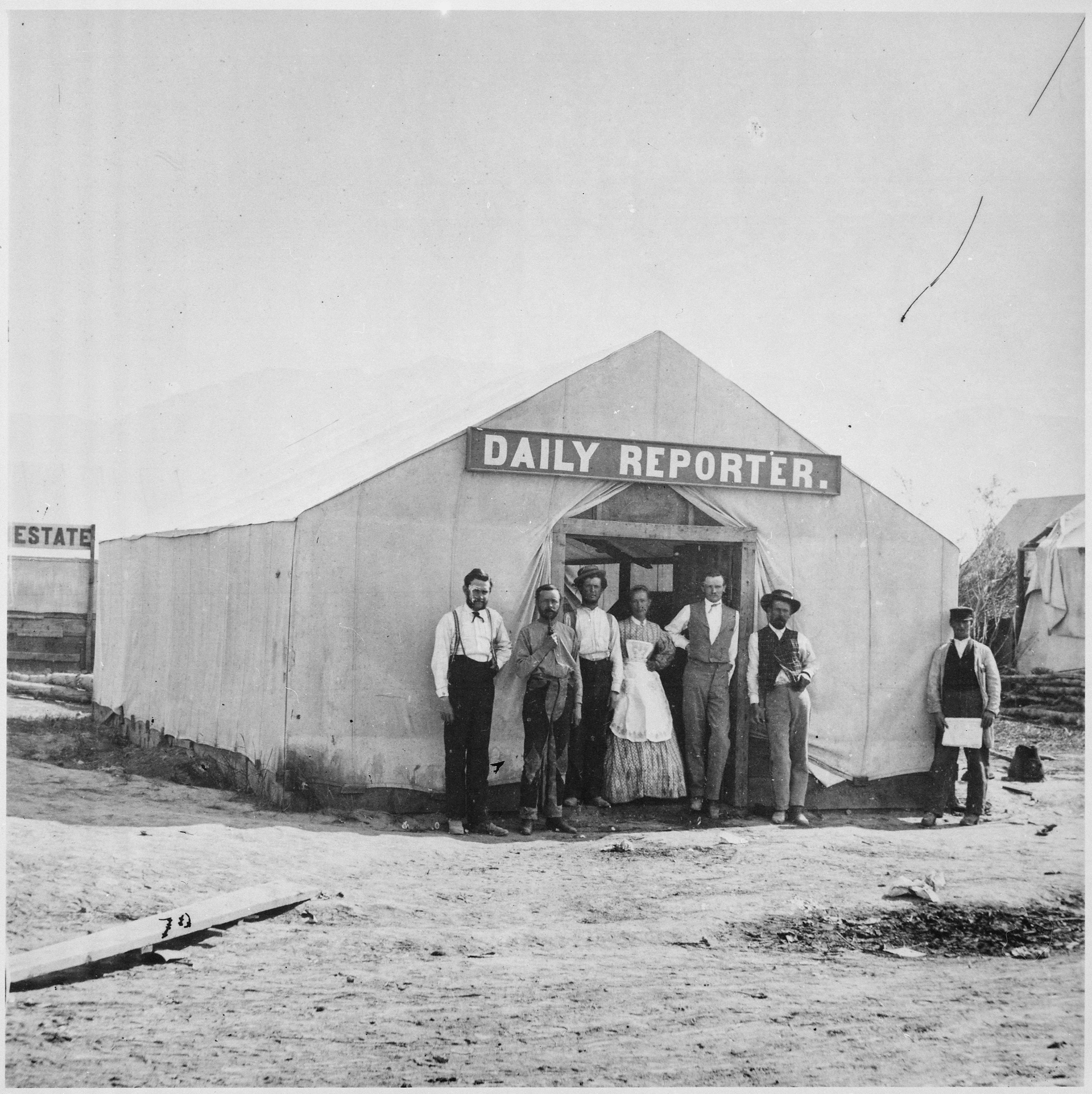
Corinne. Staff of the Daily Reporter. Box Elder County, Utah., 1869 - 1878

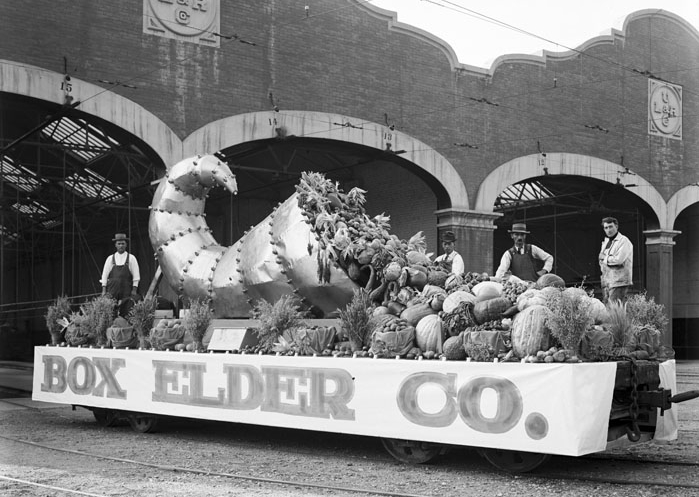
Box Elder County float, 1912

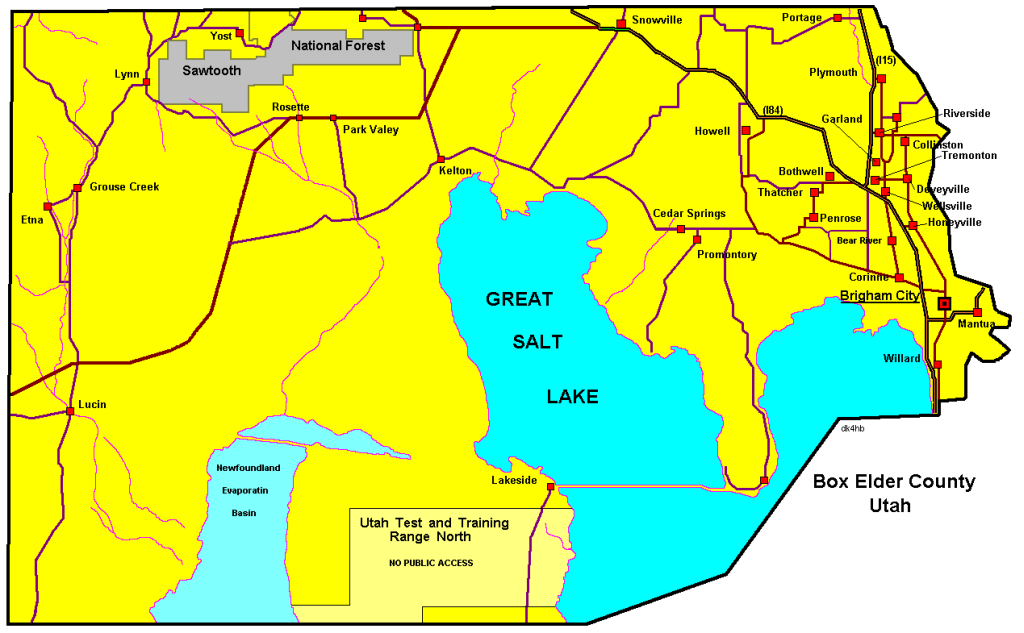
Box Elder County (details)

The county was created by the Utah Territory legislature on January 5, 1856, with the territory partitioned from Weber County. Its boundaries were altered in 1862 by adjustments between counties and in 1866 when all its area in the now-existent state of Nevada (which had gained territorial status in 1861 and statehood in 1864) was formally partitioned. The county boundaries were finally altered in 1880 by adjustments between Salt Lake and Weber counties. Its boundary has remained unchanged since 1880.

The California Trail followed Goose Creek from a point just north of the Idaho/Utah border southwest across northwestern Box Elder County to Little Goose Creek in northeastern Elko County, Nevada. The link-up of the first transcontinental railroad occurred at Promontory Summit, Utah in 1869.

The Spiral Jetty, an earthwork sculpture by Robert Smithson, was built on the north shore of the Great Salt Lake in Box Elder County in 1970.

On November 19, 2005, sculptor Zaq Landsberg declared his plot to be independent from the United States, creating the Republic of Zaqistan.

== Geography ==
Box Elder County lies at the northwest corner of Utah. Its west border abuts the east border of the state of Nevada and its north border abuts the south border of the state of Idaho. Its territory includes large tracts of barren desert, contrasted by high, forested mountains. The Wasatch Front lies along the south-eastern border, where the main cities are found. The terrain generally slopes to the south (toward the Great Salt Lake), although the NW corner of the county slopes to the north, allowing runoff from that area to flow to the Snake River drainage. The county's highest point is a mountain ridge near the NW corner, at 9,180 ft (2,800 m) ASL. The county has a total area of 6,729 square miles (17,430 km^{2}), of which 5,746 square miles (14,880 km^{2}) is land and 984 square miles (2,550 km^{2}) (15%) is water. It is the fourth-largest county in Utah by area.

In the east lie the Wellsville Mountains, a branch of the Wasatch Range. In the west is a large, mostly uninhabited desert area. The Great Salt Lake lies in the southeastern corner of the county. The combined Interstate 15/Interstate 84 runs northward in the eastern part of the county. The two routes diverge at Tremonton, with I-84 heading northwest past Snowville into central and western Idaho and I-15 heading north past Plymouth and Portage into eastern Idaho.

=== Major highways ===
- I-15
- I-15 BL (Brigham City)
- I-15 BL (Tremonton)
- I-84
- I-84 BL (Brigham City)
- I-84 BL (Tremonton)
- US 89
- US 91
- SR-13
- SR-30
- SR-38
- SR-42
- SR-82
- SR-83
- SR-102

=== Adjacent counties ===
- Cache County - northeast
- Weber County - east
- Davis County - southeast (across Great Salt Lake)
- Tooele County - south
- Elko County, Nevada - west
- Cassia County, Idaho - northwest
- Oneida County, Idaho - north

=== National protected areas ===
- Bear River Migratory Bird Refuge
- Caribou-Targhee National Forest (part)
- Golden Spike National Historic Site
- Sawtooth National Forest (part)
- Wasatch-Cache National Forest (part)

== Demographics ==
Historical population
Census	Pop.	Note	%±
1860	1,608		—
1870	4,855		201.9%
1880	6,761		39.3%
1890	7,642		13.0%
1900	10,009		31.0%
1910	13,894		38.8%
1920	18,788		35.2%
1930	17,810		−5.2%
1940	18,832		5.7%
1950	19,734		4.8%
1960	25,061		27.0%
1970	28,129		12.2%
1980	33,222		18.1%
1990	36,485		9.8%
2000	42,745		17.2%
2010	49,975		16.9%
2020	57,666		15.4%
2025 (est.)	65,320	▲	13.3%
US Decennial Census; 1790–1960 1900–1990; 1990–2000 2010–2018 2019 2020

=== 2020 census ===
According to the 2020 United States census and 2020 American Community Survey, there were 57,666 people in Box Elder County with a population density of 10.0 people per square mile (3.9/km^{2}). Among non-Hispanic or Latino people, the racial makeup was 49,361 (85.6%) White, 161 (0.3%) African American, 383 (0.7%) Native American, 438 (0.8%) Asian, 98 (0.2%) Pacific Islander, 102 (0.2%) from other races, and 1,586 (2.8%) from two or more races. 5,537 (9.6%) people were Hispanic or Latino.

Box Elder County, Utah – Racial and ethnic composition Note: the US Census treats Hispanic/Latino as an ethnic category. This table excludes Latinos from the racial categories and assigns them to a separate category. Hispanics/Latinos may be of any race.
Race / Ethnicity (NH = Non-Hispanic)	Pop 2000	Pop 2010	Pop 2020	% 2000	% 2010	% 2020
White alone (NH)	38,717	44,109	49,361	90.58%	88.26%	85.60%
Black or African American alone (NH)	66	139	161	0.15%	0.28%	0.28%
Native American or Alaska Native alone (NH)	329	329	383	0.77%	0.66%	0.66%
Asian alone (NH)	400	430	438	0.94%	0.86%	0.76%
Pacific Islander alone (NH)	33	78	98	0.08%	0.16%	0.17%
Other race alone (NH)	13	44	102	0.03%	0.09%	0.18%
Mixed race or Multiracial (NH)	396	694	1,586	0.93%	1.39%	2.75%
Hispanic or Latino (any race)	2,791	4,152	5,537	6.53%	8.31%	9.60%
Total	42,745	49,975	57,666	100.00%	100.00%	100.00%

There were 29,190 (50.62%) males and 28,476 (49.38%) females, and the population distribution by age was 18,255 (31.7%) under the age of 18, 31,620 (54.8%) from 18 to 64, and 7,791 (13.5%) who were at least 65 years old. The median age was 33.0 years.

There were 18,678 households in Box Elder County with an average size of 3.09 of which 14,609 (78.2%) were families and 4,069 (21.8%) were non-families. Among all families, 11,985 (64.2%) were married couples, 969 (5.2%) were male householders with no spouse, and 1,655 (8.9%) were female householders with no spouse. Among all non-families, 3,482 (18.6%) were a single person living alone and 587 (3.1%) were two or more people living together. 7,722 (41.3%) of all households had children under the age of 18. 14,543 (77.9%) of households were owner-occupied while 4,135 (22.1%) were renter-occupied.

The median income for a Box Elder County household was $63,573 and the median family income was $73,446, with a per-capita income of $25,835. The median income for males that were full-time employees was $52,960 and for females $36,673. 7.9% of the population and 6.4% of families were below the poverty line.

In terms of education attainment, out of the 32,717 people in Box Elder County 25 years or older, 2,325 (7.1%) had not completed high school, 9,937 (30.4%) had a high school diploma or equivalency, 12,701 (38.8%) had some college or associate degree, 5,656 (17.3%) had a bachelor's degree, and 2,098 (6.4%) had a graduate or professional degree.

=== 2010 census ===
As of the 2010 census, there were 49,975 people, 16,058 households, and 12,891 families in the county. The population density was 8.70 people per square mile (3.36 people/km^{2}). There were 17,326 housing units at an average density of 3.02 units per square mile (1.17 units/km^{2}). The racial makeup of the county was 91.77% White, 0.34% Black or African American, 0.82% Native American, 0.89% Asian, 0.17% Pacific Islander, 3.77% from other races, and 2.24% from two or more races. 8.31% of the population were Hispanic or Latino of any race.

There were 16,058 households, out of which 41.32% had children under 18 living with them, 67.44% were married couples living together, 8.69% had a female householder with no husband present, and 19.72% were non-families. 17.16% of all households were made up of individuals, and 7.39% had someone living alone who was 65 years of age or older. The average household size was 3.09, and the average family size was 3.50.

The county population contained 36.60% under the age of 20, 5.55% from 20 to 24, 25.37% from 25 to 44, 21.35% from 45 to 64, and 11.13% who were 65 years of age or older. The median age was 30.6 years. For every 100 females, there were 101.59 males. For every 100 females aged 18 and over, there were 96.61 males.

=== Ancestry ===
As of 2015, the largest self-reported ancestry groups in Box Elder County were:

- 26.0% were of English ancestry
- 12.7% were of German ancestry
- 9.3% were of American ancestry
- 8.4% were of Danish ancestry
- 5.5% were of Irish ancestry
- 4.5% were of Scottish ancestry

== Education ==
=== Elementary ===
- Century
- Discovery
- Fielding
- Garland
- Golden Spike
- Grouse Creek
- Lake View
- McKinley
- North Park
- Park Valley
- Snowville
- Three Mile Creek
- Willard

=== Intermediate ===
- Alice C. Harris
- Adele C. Young

=== Middle ===
- Bear River
- Box Elder

=== High ===
- Bear River High School – Garland
- Box Elder High School – Brigham City
- Sunrise High School – Brigham City

=== Speciality schools ===
- Independent Life Skills Center

=== Post secondary ===
- Utah State University-Brigham City
- Utah State University-Tremonton
- Bridgerland Technical College – Brigham City

== Government ==
Box Elder voters are overwhelmingly Republican. In no national election since 1944 has the county selected the Democratic Party candidate, and the last Democrat to obtain one-quarter of the county's vote was Hubert Humphrey in 1968.

United States presidential election results for Box Elder County, Utah
Year	Republican		Democratic		Third party(ies)	
Year	No.	%	No.	%	No.	%
1896	735	28.12%	1,879	71.88%	0	0.00%
1900	1,635	52.72%	1,460	47.08%	6	0.19%
1904	2,400	66.76%	1,151	32.02%	44	1.22%
1908	2,396	62.15%	1,417	36.76%	42	1.09%
1912	1,650	40.61%	1,402	34.51%	1,011	24.88%
1916	2,416	44.67%	2,957	54.68%	35	0.65%
1920	3,421	58.86%	2,330	40.09%	61	1.05%
1924	3,086	56.18%	1,841	33.52%	566	10.30%
1928	3,317	56.94%	2,488	42.71%	20	0.34%
1932	3,048	44.65%	3,695	54.12%	84	1.23%
1936	2,180	30.15%	5,001	69.16%	50	0.69%
1940	3,248	40.67%	4,736	59.30%	2	0.03%
1944	3,058	42.47%	4,138	57.46%	5	0.07%
1948	3,790	50.70%	3,667	49.06%	18	0.24%
1952	5,850	66.22%	2,984	33.78%	0	0.00%
1956	5,804	68.34%	2,689	31.66%	0	0.00%
1960	6,594	63.23%	3,831	36.74%	3	0.03%
1964	6,851	57.26%	5,113	42.74%	0	0.00%
1968	7,680	65.71%	3,093	26.46%	915	7.83%
1972	9,880	77.22%	2,134	16.68%	780	6.10%
1976	9,319	69.02%	3,353	24.84%	829	6.14%
1980	12,500	82.72%	2,142	14.18%	469	3.10%
1984	13,243	86.65%	1,983	12.98%	57	0.37%
1988	12,585	81.40%	2,736	17.70%	140	0.91%
1992	7,712	49.58%	2,186	14.05%	5,657	36.37%
1996	8,373	62.65%	3,170	23.72%	1,822	13.63%
2000	12,288	79.36%	2,555	16.50%	640	4.13%
2004	15,751	85.75%	2,244	12.22%	373	2.03%
2008	15,228	79.24%	3,311	17.23%	678	3.53%
2012	17,101	88.11%	1,984	10.22%	323	1.66%
2016	12,230	61.53%	2,282	11.48%	5,366	26.99%
2020	21,548	79.73%	4,473	16.55%	1,006	3.72%
2024	22,853	79.02%	5,274	18.24%	793	2.74%

State elected offices
Position	District	Name	Affiliation	First elected
Senate	17	Scott Sandall	Republican	2018
House of Representatives	1	Joel Ferry	Republican	2018
House of Representatives	29	Matthew Gwynn	Republican	2020
Board of Education	1	Jennie Earl	Nonpartisan	2018

== Communities ==
Map of Box Elder County municipalities and CDPs

=== Cities ===
- Bear River City
- Brigham City (county seat)
- Corinne
- Garland
- Honeyville
- Perry
- Tremonton
- Willard

=== Towns ===
- Deweyville
- Elwood
- Fielding
- Howell
- Mantua
- Plymouth
- Portage
- Snowville

=== Census designated places ===
- Riverside
- South Willard
- Thatcher

=== Unincorporated communities ===
- Bothwell
- Collinston
- Grouse Creek
- Harper Ward
- Lynn
- Park Valley
- Penrose
- Promontory
- Yost

=== Ghost towns ===
- Blue Creek
- Cedar Creek
- Golden
- Hardup
- Jackson
- Kelton
- Kosmo
- Lucin
- Matlin
- Promontory Point
- Russian Settlement
- Terrace
- Washakie

== The Stratos Project ==
The Stratos Project is a proposed data center that will be located across Box Elder County. It was proposed to the Box Elder County Commission on April 24, 2026. The Box Elder County Commission reviewed and approved the proposal on May 4, 2026. When, proposed it was a 40,000-acre development in Hansel Valley. Following environmental and legislative negotiations, the footprint was reduced to roughly 10,000 acres. The power usage expected to require up to 9 gigawatts (GW)

The Box Elder County Commission who unanimously voted on May 4, 2026, to approve the Stratos data center project consisted of three members: Lee Perry, Boyd Bingham, and Tyler Vincent. The public controversy surrounding the project, both Commissioners Perry and Bingham lost their Republican primary bids in June 2026 to challengers Nathan Tueller and Vance Smith.

== See also ==
- List of counties in Utah
- National Register of Historic Places listings in Box Elder County, Utah
