= Salt Lake County, Utah =

County in Utah, United States

- County
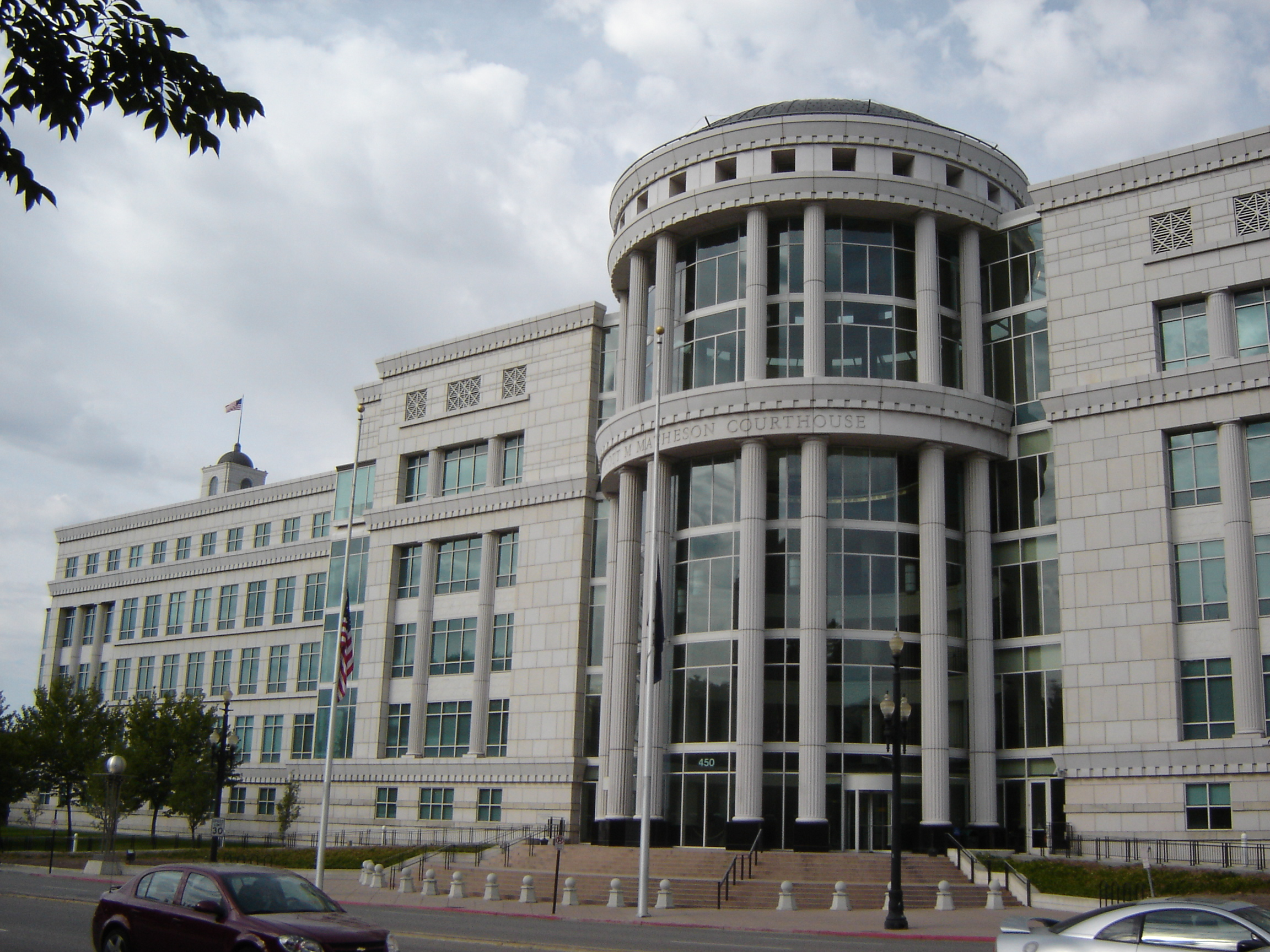
- The Utah Supreme Court meets at Scott M. Matheson Court House in Salt Lake City

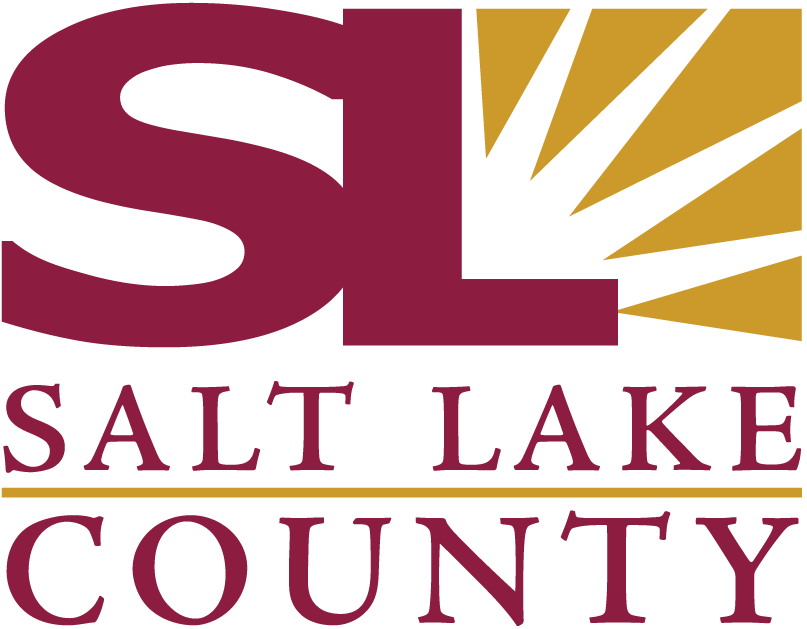
- Logo

- Location within the U.S. state of Utah
- Coordinates: 40°40′N 111°56′W
- Country: United States
- State: Utah
- Founded: January 31, 1850
- Named for: Great Salt Lake
- Seat: Salt Lake City
- Largest city: Salt Lake City

Area
  - Total: 807 sq mi (2,090 km^{2})
  - Land: 742 sq mi (1,920 km^{2})
  - Water: 65 sq mi (170 km^{2}) 8.1%

Population (2020)
  - Total: 1,185,238
  - Estimate (2025): 1,220,916 ▲
  - Density: 1,598/sq mi (617/km^{2})

GDP
  - Total: $153.846 billion (2024)
- Time zone: UTC−7 (Mountain)
  - Summer (DST): UTC−6 (MDT)
- Congressional districts: 1st, 2nd, 3rd, 4th
- Website: www.saltlakecounty.gov

Salt Lake County is located in the U.S. state of Utah. As of the 2020 United States census, the population was 1,185,238, making it the most populous county in Utah. Its county seat and largest city is Salt Lake City, the state capital. The county was created in 1850. Salt Lake County is the 37th most populated county in the United States and is one of four counties in the Intermountain West to make it into the top 100 (others being Denver and El Paso counties, Colorado and Clark County, Nevada.) Salt Lake County has been the only county of the first class in Utah. Under the Utah Code (Title 17, Chapter 50, Part 5) a county of the first class is a county with a population of 1,000,000 or greater.

Salt Lake County occupies the Salt Lake Valley, as well as parts of the surrounding mountains, the Oquirrh Mountains to the west and the Wasatch Range to the east (essentially the entire Jordan River watershed north of the Traverse Mountains). In addition, the northwestern section of the county includes part of the Great Salt Lake. The county is noted for its ski resorts; Salt Lake City hosted the 2002 Winter Olympics. Salt Lake County is the central county of the Salt Lake City metropolitan area.

== History ==
This area was occupied for thousands of years by cultures of indigenous peoples.

=== 19th century ===
The future Salt Lake County area was settled by European Americans in 1847 when Mormon pioneers of the Church of Jesus Christ of Latter-day Saints fled religious persecution in the East. They arrived in the Salt Lake Valley after descending what settlers later called Emigration Canyon. Brigham Young, their leader, declared "This is the place" after seeing the valley. Compared to eastern regions, it seemed arid and unpromising to some of the migrants. Settlers used irrigation to develop agriculture and the flourishing, self-sufficient city known then as Great Salt Lake City. Thousands of Mormons joined them in the next several decades.

Settlers buried thirty-six Native Americans in one grave after an outbreak of measles occurred during the winter of 1847.

The initial territorial settlement was in Great Salt Lake City proper, but Brigham Young desired to secure a substantial population base across the then-uninhabited Great Basin, so he soon asked members to resettle farther out from the central point. They declared themselves a state (State of Deseret) in hopes of gaining admittance to the Union, and to assure the nascent state would grow uniformly, they named an as-yet-unbuilt settlement in mid-state as the state's capital (Fillmore).

The county was officially organized on January 31, 1850, with slightly more than 11,000 residents recorded. In 1850, 26 slaves were counted in Salt Lake County. In 1852, the territorial legislature passed the Act in Relation to Service and the Act for the relief of Indian Slaves and Prisoners formally legalizing slavery in the territory.

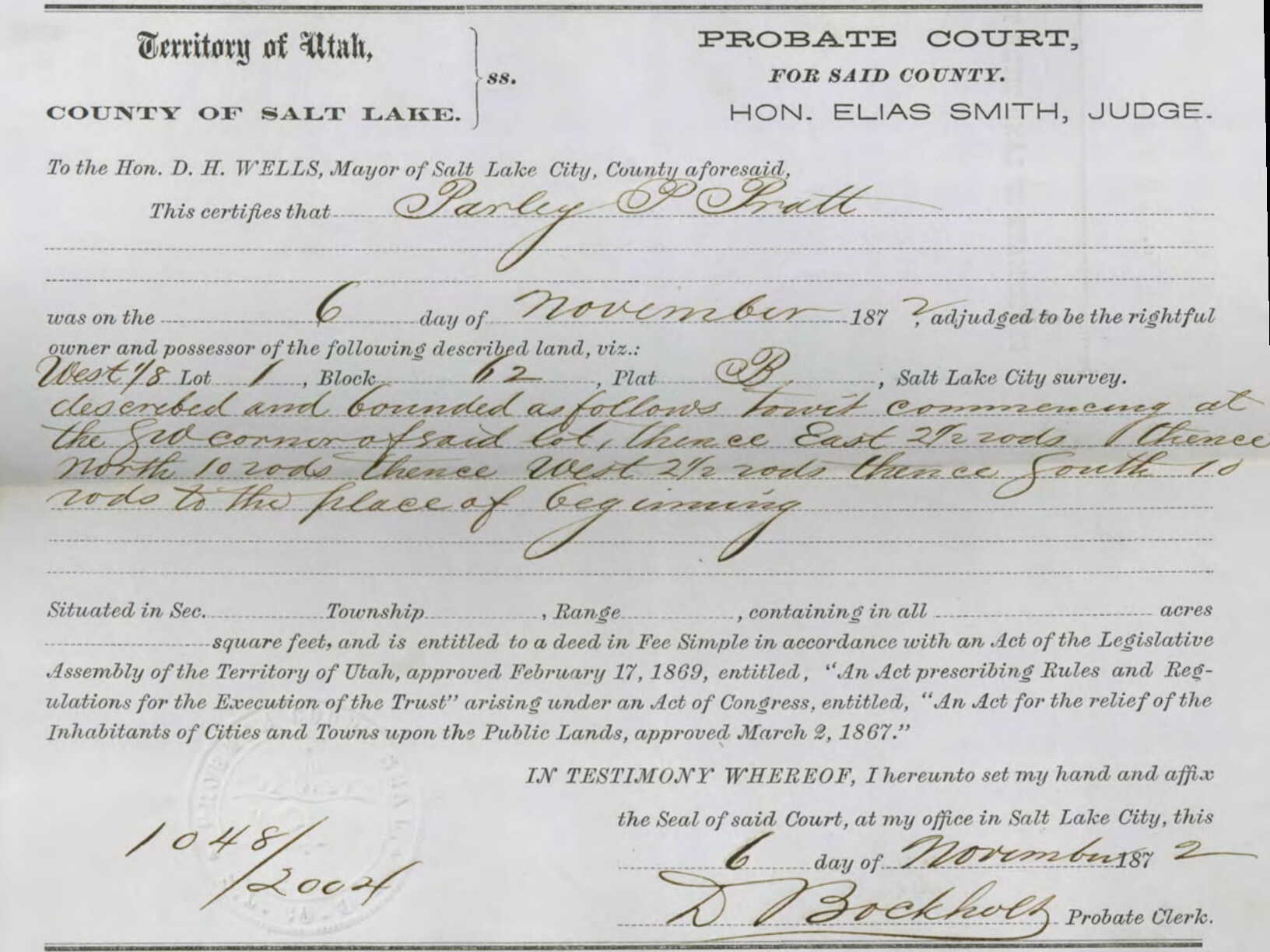
Parley P. Pratt's Land Title Certificate, No. 1048, 1872

Due to Utah Territory's conflicts with the federal government, the federal surveyor abandoned his post in 1857, two years after he arrived. The surveyor's duty was to officially plat the territory in order to bring the area onto the market, to make homesteading possible. The intermediate years between 1857 and 1869 passed with no federal surveyors, the LDS Pioneers completed plats, deeds, and surveys of the county in order to homestead and collect taxes. Since the deeds and titles handed out during the twelve-year period were not federally recognized homestead certificates, the Utah Territory agreed to reconcile the unrecognized deeds and titles in order to fold the Utah Territory into the federal homestead system, calling them (instead of homestead certificates) Land Title Certificates. The process to adjudicate the certificates took place over several years in 1871–1873, through the county Probate Court, overseen by judge Elias Smith. Settlers were required to file land claims, make declaratory statements, attend their adjudication hearings, provide testimony if counter claims on a parcel of land were filed, and wait for final judgement from the probate judge, who issued a final Land Title Certificate which declared a person the rightful owner. These certificates are retroactive backwards to 1852.

The idea of statehood for the new area was quickly tossed aside by the federal government, and the area was declared a territory in September 1850 – the Utah Territory. Construction of the capitol building in Fillmore was completed in 1855, so the territorial legislature traveled to the small community for their first session there. It was to be their last, as they chose to meet in Great Salt Lake City the following year and, in 1857, formally voted to make the city the capital of the Territory. In 1858, when the Utah Territory was declared in rebellion, the federal government sent troops to install a new governor and keep watch over the area. The government transition was made peacefully, then the troops set up Camp Floyd to the south in Utah County. In 1862, Fort Douglas was established on the eastern bench, near the current site of the University of Utah, as the federal government wanted to ensure the loyalty of the territory during the American Civil War. On January 29, 1868, "Great" was dropped from both the county and city names, giving them their modern names.

Patrick Edward Connor, the leader of the garrison at Fort Douglas, was openly anti-Mormon. He sent out parties to scout for mineral resources in the nearby mountains, hoping to encourage non-Mormons to settle in the territory. During the late 19th century, mines were established in the Wasatch mountains, most notably around Alta (and nearby Park City in Summit County). Exploiting the mineral wealth was difficult until the Utah Central Railroad was constructed and reached this area in 1870.

In the Oquirrh Mountains, the Bingham Canyon Mine, which contains vast deposits of copper and silver, was developed as the most productive of the county's mines. The mine, located in the southwest portion of the county, attracted thousands of workers to the narrow canyon. At its peak, the city of Bingham Canyon contained 20,000 residents, all crowded along the steep walls of the canyon, and natural disasters were a frequent occurrence. By the early 20th century, most of the mines in the county had closed. However, the Bingham Canyon Mine kept on expanding. In the early 21st century, it is among the largest open-pit mines in the world.

=== 20th century ===
After the railroad came to the county, the population began to expand more rapidly, and non-Mormons began to settle in Salt Lake City. During the early 20th century, the heavy industry came to the valley as well, diversifying its economy. Local and interurban trolley systems were built covering the more urban northeastern quarter of the valley. The city dismantled the trolley system by 1945, favoring the use of individual cars. Throughout the late 19th and early 20th centuries, the east side of the valley began to be more densely settled.

In 1942, Kearns Army Air Base, a large military installation developed for World War II, was located in what is now Kearns on the western side of the valley. After the camp was closed in 1946, the land was sold for private development. Rapid postwar residential settlement of the area began. The federal government established other major defensive installations along the Wasatch Front and in the Great Salt Lake Desert during World War II, which stimulated the economy and brought more people to the area, establishing Utah as a major military center that benefited from federal investment. In the nationwide suburban boom of the late 1940s, 1950s, and early 1960s, such cities as South Salt Lake, Murray, Midvale, and much of the east side of the valley grew rapidly.

In common with other industrialized cities, Salt Lake City faced inner-city decay in the 1960s, when residents moved to newer housing in the suburbs. Cities such as Sandy, West Jordan, and what would become West Valley City grew at boomtown rates in the 1970s and 1980s. Huge residential tracts were developed through the center of the valley, and within ten years, the entire area had been converted from farmland into sprawling bedroom communities in Salt Lake City. West Valley City was created from the merger of the three unincorporated cities of Granger, Hunter and Redwood (including Chesterfield) in 1980.

But not every area of the county saw growth. The former mining towns related to Bingham Canyon were abandoned in the 1960s and 1970s to make way for the expansion of the open-pit mine. The city of Bingham Canyon was completely torn down and swallowed up in the mine by 1972, and the dismantling of Lark in 1980 completed the process. The only remaining mining town in the county is Copperton, located southwest of West Jordan, with approximately 800 residents. Magna has workers who continue to be associated with the mine's smelting operations in Garfield and at Arthur Mill.

In the 1990s, the county's areas of rapid growth shifted further south and west. Farm and pasturelands were developed as suburbs. The cities of West Jordan, South Jordan, Riverton, Herriman, and Draper are some of the fastest-growing cities in the state. During the 1990s, Salt Lake City gained population for the first time in 40 years.

=== 21st century ===
Salt Lake City's selection as the host of the 2002 Winter Olympics spurred a construction boom in the city that continued after the Olympics, slowing only in 2008 recession. As the county's population has surpassed 1 million, it has significantly urbanized, leaving only a few rural areas in the far west of the valley. Issues facing the county today include congested transportation and related air pollution.

== Geography ==
The Salt Lake Valley is fed by seven streams from the surrounding mountains. All the runoff water eventually ends in the Great Salt Lake, which has no outlet. The mountains rise precipitously from the relatively flat valley surfaces, indicating their comparatively youthful formation. The county has a total area of 807 square miles (2,090 km^{2}), of which 742 square miles (1,920 km^{2}) is land and 65 square miles (170 km^{2}) (8.1%) is water. It is the fifth-smallest county in Utah by area. The county borders on the Great Salt Lake and is traversed by the northward flowing Jordan River.

The western portion of the county descends toward the valley of the lake, but perhaps the most dominating physical feature in Salt Lake County is the Wasatch Mountains in the eastern portion of the county, famous for both summer and winter activities. The mountains are administered as part of the Wasatch-Cache National Forest. The mountains' snow is touted in state-sponsored publicity as 'Greatest Snow on Earth' for its soft, powdery texture, and led to Salt Lake City's winning the bid for the 2002 Winter Olympics. Salt Lake County has four ski resorts: Snowbird and Alta in Little Cottonwood Canyon and Solitude and Brighton in Big Cottonwood Canyon. Hiking and camping are popular summer activities. The Oquirrh Mountains border the western part of the county. These two mountain ranges, together with the much smaller Traverse Mountains at the south of the valley, delimit Salt Lake Valley, which is also flanked on the northwest by the Great Salt Lake, and on the north by the Salt Lake Anticline (including Ensign Peak).

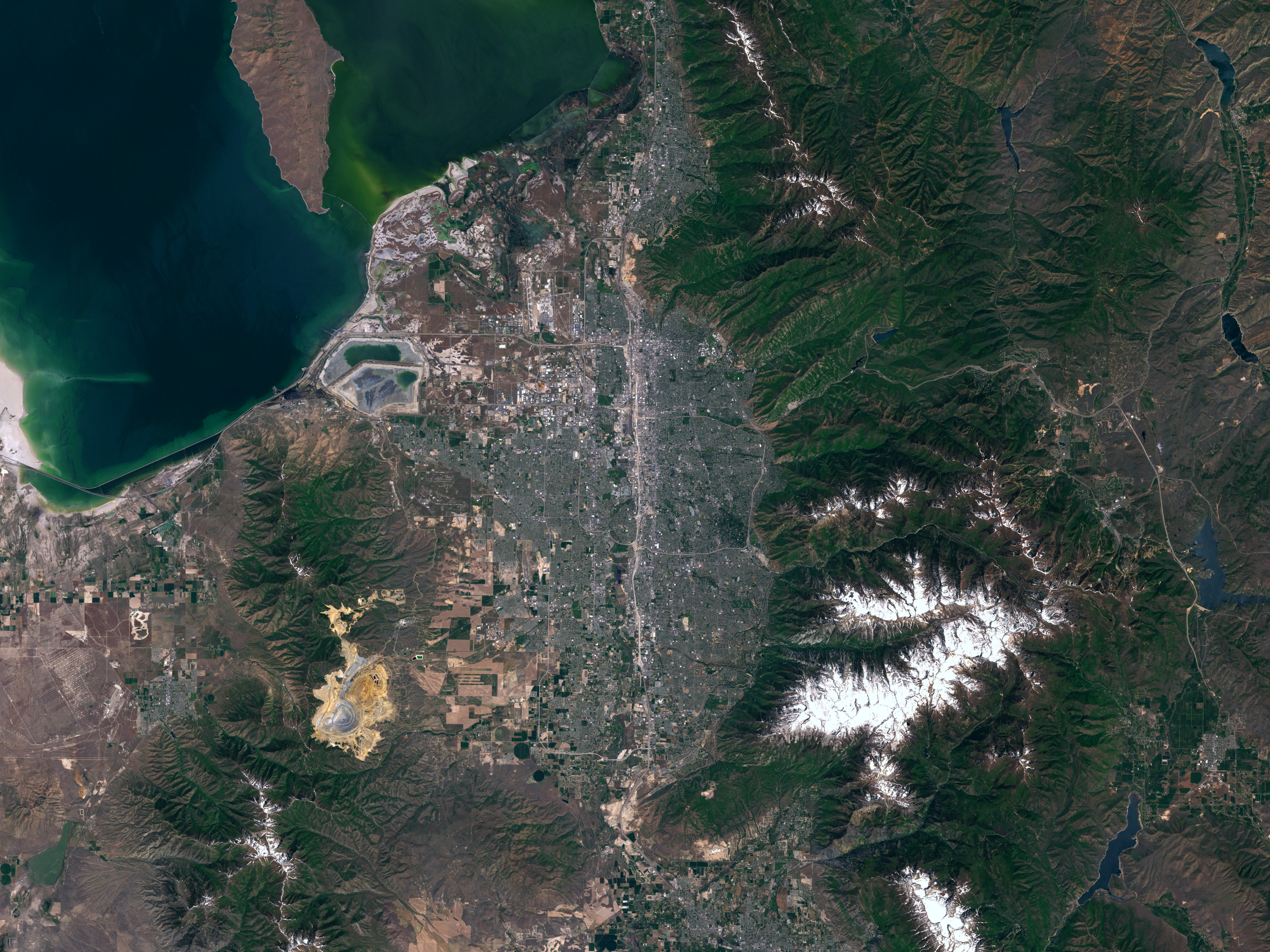
Salt Lake County and surrounding area as seen from above

On the north and east benches, houses have been built halfway up the mountain to the boundary of the national forest, assuming greater risk from wildfires. New communities are also being constructed on the southern and western slopes. Rapid residential construction continues in the west-central, southwest, and southern portions of the valley. In the far west, southwest, and northwest, rural areas still exist, but rapid growth threatens what remains of the natural environment in the valley. The County government operates several large parks in the valley (including some with incorporated cities), including Big Cottonwood Park, Crestwood Park, and an Equestrian Center.

=== Access ===
Traffic into the Salt Lake Valley passes through four narrow geographic features: Parley's Canyon to the east; the space between the Salt Lake Anticline and the Great Salt Lake leading into Davis County to the north; the Point of the Mountain and adjacent Jordan Narrows leading to Utah County to the south; and a space (known as Garfield) between the Oquirrh Mountains and the Great Salt Lake leading to Tooele County to the west. Of these, only the connection to Davis County to the north is wide enough and flat enough to accommodate transportation routes without reliance on earthworks.

=== Adjacent counties ===
- Davis County – north
- Morgan County – northeast
- Summit County – east
- Wasatch County – southeast
- Utah County – south
- Tooele County – west

=== Climate ===
Annual precipitation for the Salt Lake Valley is around 15 inches (380 mm), usually with more on the east side and less on the west side, as most storms come from the Pacific Ocean and the west side is in the rain shadow of the Oquirrh Mountains. Up to 19 inches (480 mm) is received on the east benches. Most of this precipitation is received in spring. The summer is dry, with the majority of precipitation arriving from the monsoon that rises from the south. Short, localized, and often dry thunderstorms are usually associated with the monsoon. However, some can be very intense. These storms can cause contrasting emergencies of flash floods and wildfires (due to dry lightning and powerful winds). Precipitation is heaviest in late fall/early winter and in spring, while early summer is the driest season.

Annual snowfall in the valley is 55 inches (140 cm), with up to 100 inches (250 cm) on the benches. The most snow falls between mid-November and late March. The mountains receive up to 500 inches (1,300 cm) of light, dry snow and up to 55 inches (140 cm) of precipitation annually. The dry snow is often considered good for skiing, contributing to the four ski resorts in the county. Snow usually falls from October through May. The heavy snow totals across the county can be attributed to the lake-effect, where precipitation is intensified by the warm waters of the Great Salt Lake, which never entirely freezes due to the lake's high salinity. The lake effect can affect any area of the county, depending on wind conditions. The dry snow is attributed to the low humidity of the region.

During winter, temperature inversions are common, causing air pollution in the valley. They trap pollutants, moisture, and cold temperatures in the valley while the surrounding mountains enjoy warm temperatures and clear skies. This can cause some melting snow in the mountains and unhealthy air quality, and low visibility in the valley. This weather event lasts from a few days to a month in extreme cases and is caused when an area of high pressure forms over the Great Basin.

== Demographics ==
Historical population
| Census | Pop. | Note | %± |
|---|---|---|---|
| 1850 | 6,157 | | — |
| 1860 | 11,295 | | 83.4% |
| 1870 | 18,337 | | 62.3% |
| 1880 | 31,977 | | 74.4% |
| 1890 | 58,457 | | 82.8% |
| 1900 | 77,725 | | 33.0% |
| 1910 | 131,426 | | 69.1% |
| 1920 | 159,282 | | 21.2% |
| 1930 | 194,102 | | 21.9% |
| 1940 | 211,623 | | 9.0% |
| 1950 | 274,895 | | 29.9% |
| 1960 | 383,035 | | 39.3% |
| 1970 | 458,607 | | 19.7% |
| 1980 | 619,066 | | 35.0% |
| 1990 | 725,956 | | 17.3% |
| 2000 | 898,387 | | 23.8% |
| 2010 | 1,029,655 | | 14.6% |
| 2020 | 1,185,238 | | 15.1% |
| 2025 (est.) | 1,220,916 | ▲ | 3.0% |
US Decennial Census; 1790–1960 1900–1990; 1990–2000 2010–2020

Salt Lake County racial composition
| Race or Ethnicity | 2020 | 2010 | 2000 | 1990 | 1950 | 1900 |
|---|---|---|---|---|---|---|
| White | 71.5% | 81.2% | 92.0% | 93.1% | 98.6% | 99.2% |
| —Non-Hispanic | 67.6% | 73.9% | 78.1% | 89.9% | n/a | n/a |
| Black or African American | 2.0% | 1.6% | 1.3% | 0.8% | 0.4% | 0.4% |
| Hispanic or Latino (of any race) | 19.6% | 17.1% | 14.7% | 5.9% | 3.1% | n/a |
| Asian | 4.3% | 3.3% | 2.9% | 2.0% | 0.7% | n/a |
| Hawaiian & Pacific Islander | 1.8% | 1.5% | 1.3% | 0.7% | n/a | n/a |
| Native American | 1.1% | 0.9% | 0.9% | 0.9% | 0.7% | 0.01% |
| Multiracial | 9.9% | 3.1% | 1.5%^{[1]} | n/a | n/a | n/a |

^{1} The 2000 census was the first to allow residents to select multiple race categories. Prior to 2000, the census used the category 'Other Race' as a catch-all identifier. For county-level census data in 1950 and 1900, Utah counted all non-White and non-Black residents using this category. Asian and Hispanic Americans were counted by national origin (i.e. Mexican).

=== 2020 census ===
According to the 2020 United States census and 2020 American Community Survey, there were 1,185,238 people in Salt Lake County with a population density of 1,574.3 people per square mile (607.9/km^{2}). Among non-Hispanic or Latino people, the racial makeup was 800,914 (67.6%) White, 21,976 (1.9%) African American, 7,205 (0.6%) Native American, 50,241 (4.2%) Asian, 21,194 (1.8%) Pacific Islander, 5,537 (0.5%) from other races, and 46,083 (3.9%) from two or more races. 232,088 (19.6%) people were Hispanic or Latino.

There were 595,608 (50.25%) males and 589,630 (49.75%) females, and the population distribution by age was 310,343 (26.2%) under the age of 18, 740,417 (62.5%) from 18 to 64, and 134,478 (11.3%) who were at least 65 years old. The median age was 32.9 years.

There were 405,229 households in Salt Lake County with an average size of 2.92 of which 276,809 (68.3%) were families and 128,420 (31.7%) were non-families. Among all families, 207,859 (51.3%) were married couples, 23,928 (5.9%) were male householders with no spouse, and 45,022 (11.1%) were female householders with no spouse. Among all non-families, 93,149 (23.0%) were a single person living alone and 35,271 (8.7%) were two or more people living together. 145,748 (36.0%) of all households had children under the age of 18. 259,912 (64.1%) of households were owner-occupied while 145,317 (35.9%) were renter-occupied.

The median income for a Salt Lake County household was $77,128 and the median family income was $90,815, with a per-capita income of $34,640. The median income for males that were full-time employees was $55,514 and for females $42,479. 8.6% of the population and 5.6% of families were below the poverty line.

In terms of education attainment, out of the 726,907 people in Salt Lake County 25 years or older, 61,635 (8.5%) had not completed high school, 162,491 (22.4%) had a high school diploma or equivalency, 237,252 (32.6%) had some college or associate degree, 170,110 (23.4%) had a bachelor's degree, and 95,419 (13.1%) had a graduate or professional degree.

=== Previous enumerations ===
The US Census Bureau estimate for 2019 lists 1,160,437 people in Salt Lake County. The racial makeup of the county was 70.3% non-Hispanic White, 2.2% Black, 1.4% Native American, 4.6% Asian, 1.8% Pacific Islander, and 2.9% from two or more races. 18.8% of the population were Hispanic or Latino of any race.

As of the 2010 United States census, there were 1,029,655 people, 343,218 households, and 291,686 families in the county. The population density was 1,388 per square mile (536/km^{2}). There were 364,031 housing units at an average density of 491 per square mile (190/km^{2}). The racial makeup of the county was 81.2% White, 1.59% Black or African American, 0.89% Native American, 3.3% Asian, 1.53% Pacific Islander, 8.35% from other races, and 3.14% from two or more races. 17.09% of the population were Hispanic or Latino of any race.

In 2010 there were 343,218 households, out of which 40.10% had children under the age of 18 living with them, 57.80% were married couples living together, 10.40% had a female householder with no husband present, and 27.50% were non-families. 20.80% of all households were made up of individuals, and 6.20% had someone living alone who was 65 years of age or older. The average household size was 3.00 and the average family size was 3.53.

In terms of age, 30.5% of the county's population was under the age of 18, 12.90% from 18 to 24, 30.60% from 25 to 44, 18.00% from 45 to 64, and 8.10% was 65 years of age or older. The median age was 29 years. For every 100 females, there were 101.70 males. For every 100 females age 18 and over, there were 99.70 males.

The median income for a household in the county was $48,373, and the median income for a family was $54,470. Males had a median income of $36,953 versus $26,105 for females. The per capita income for the county was $20,190. About 5.70% of families and 8.00% of the population were below the poverty threshold, including 9.00% of those under age 18 and 5.50% of those age 65 or over.

The 2005 American Community Survey indicated that 11.4% of Salt Lake County's population living in households (as opposed to group arrangements such as college dormitories) spoke Spanish at home.

=== Religion ===
According to data from the LDS Church and the State of Utah, Salt Lake County's population was 50.6% LDS (Mormon) in 2008, as reported in the Deseret News. By 2013, this had increased to 51.41%. However, by 2020, the share of LDS members had decreased to 46.89%.

== Government and politics ==
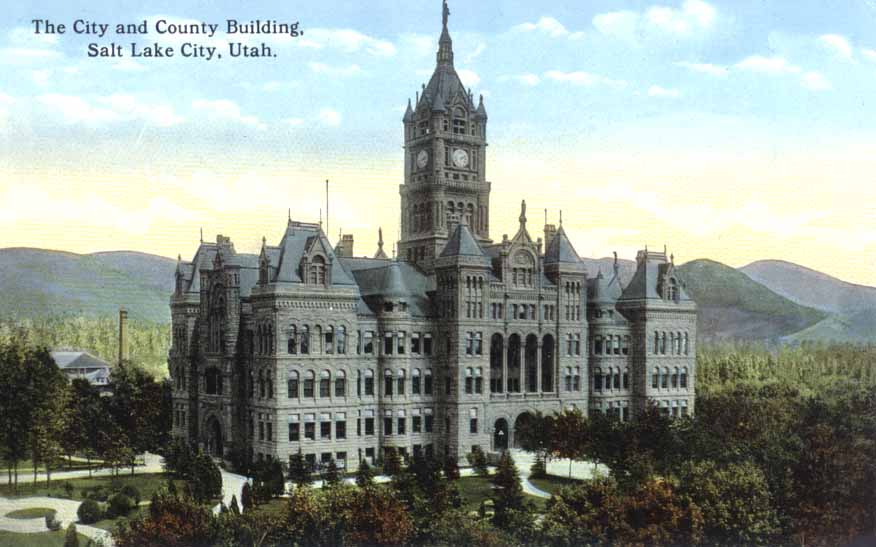
Salt Lake City and County Building circa 1923

=== County Court, March 15, 1852 – June 8, 1896 ===
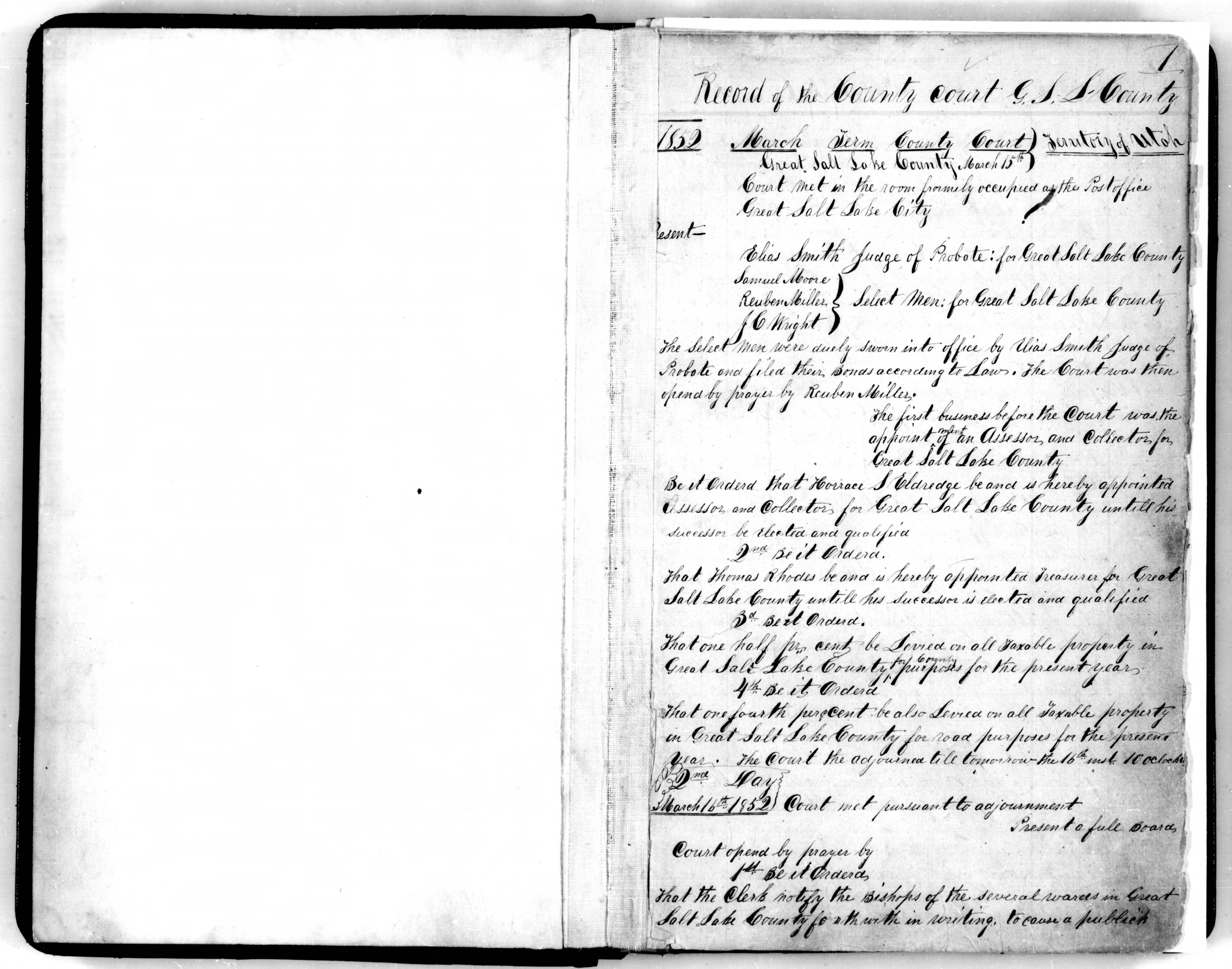
Salt Lake County Court Minutes, Book A, page 1, March 15, 1852

The first governing administrative body of the county was made up of the probate court and judge, Elias Smith, and three selectmen: Samuel Moore, Reuben Miller, and J.C. Wright. The first order of business on March 15 was to appoint a county Assessor/Collector, S. Eldridge. Second order was the appointment of a county Treasurer, Thomas Rhodes, and the third and fourth orders of business for the day was setting the rate of taxation on taxable property, at .5% of $0.01, and .25% of $0.01, as a road tax. The Court (probate section) adjudicated in civil and criminal cases in the county.

=== Commission, June 8, 1896 – January 1, 2001 ===
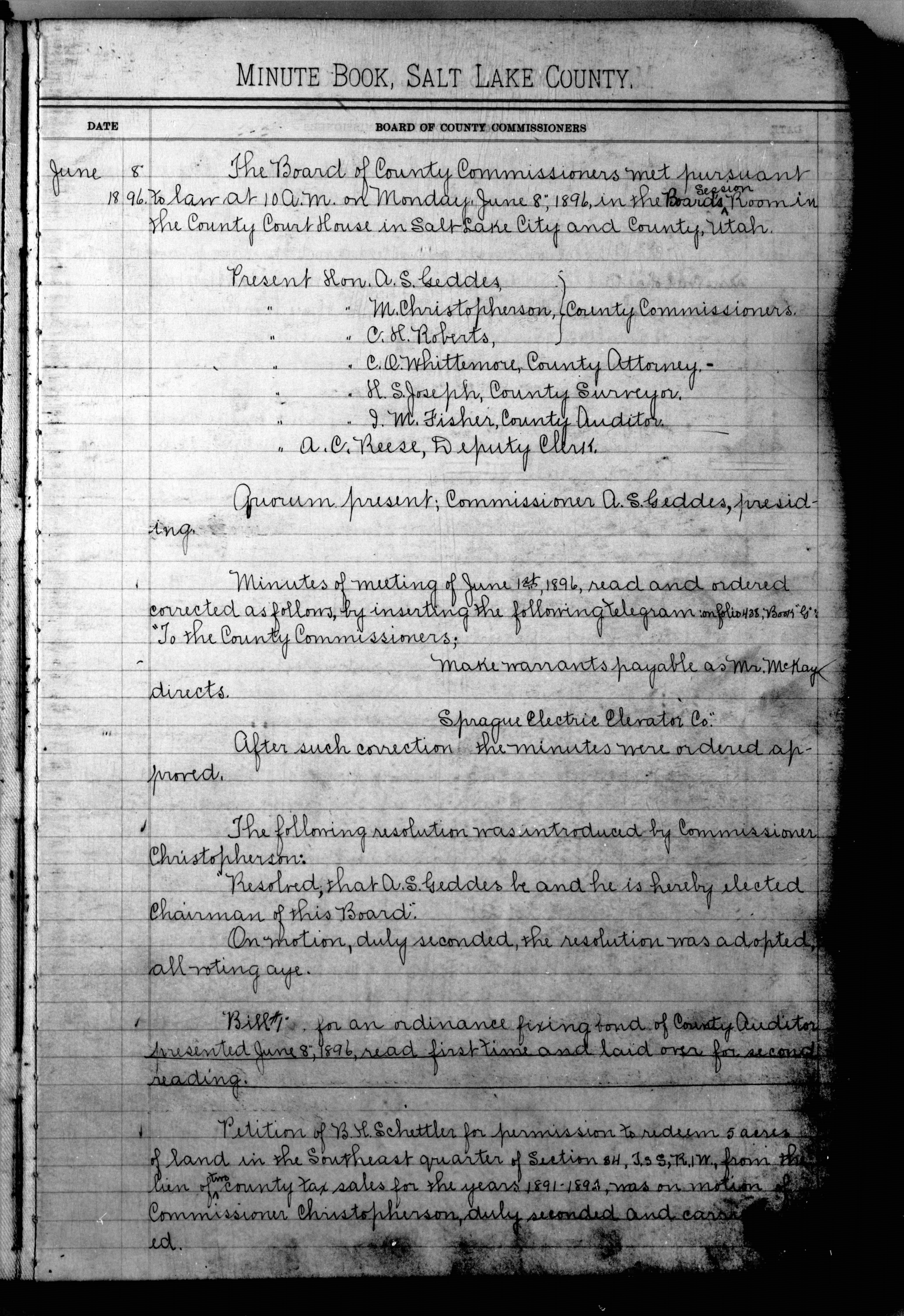
Salt Lake County, Board of County Commissioners Meeting Minutes, First Meeting, Book H, page 2697, June 8, 1896

The Board of County Commissioners began its duties on June 8, 1896, with Utah's statehood. Though the judge was removed when the court was abolished upon statehood, the Selectmen stayed on in their offices until elections to fill the new commission seats were held. The first commissioners elected were: A.S. Geddes, M. Christopherson, and C.H. Roberts. The Commission took over all duties the Court and Selectmen performed. The County Court house was demolished after the completion of the Salt Lake City and County Building in Downtown Salt Lake City in the mid-1890s. The new County Commission governed at the City and County Building until 1986 when the county government moved its offices to the newly built the Salt Lake County Government Center at State Street and 2100 South, formerly the location of the County Hospital, which was demolished in early the 1980s to build the County Government Center.

=== Council and mayor, January 1, 2001 ===
The county has a mayor–council form of government. The position of mayor is decided in partisan elections; the current mayor (since January 2019) is Jenny Wilson, a Democrat. Former county mayors include Peter Corroon, Nancy Workman and Alan Dayton (Workman's deputy mayor; sworn in as acting mayor in September 2004 when Nancy Workman was placed on paid administrative leave). The County Council is composed of three seats elected at-large and six elected by district. District-elected councilors are elected to staggered four-year terms; the at-large councilors are elected to six-year terms. See district maps

=== At-large council members ===
- Laurie Stringham (R) — Bio
- Suzanne Harrison (D) — Bio
- Natalie Pinkney (D) — Bio

=== District council members ===
- 1st District — Jiro Johnson (D) (minority leader) — Bio
- 2nd District — Carlos Moreno (R) — Bio
- 3rd District — Aimee Winder Newton (R) (Chair) — Bio
- 4th District — Ross Romero (D) — Bio
- 5th District — Sheldon Stewart (R) (Vice Chair) — Bio
- 6th District — Dea Theodore (R) (Chair pro tempore) — Bio

=== Politics ===
Like most of Utah, Salt Lake County has traditionally favored candidates from the Republican Party. However, while it is relatively conservative for an urban county, it has been friendlier to Democratic candidates than the rest of the state. All but one Democrat in the state House of Representatives, and all six Democrats in the state Senate, represent districts based in the county. Democratic presidential candidates managed to carry the county four times between 2008 and 2024, despite losing the state by large margins.

In 2004, Republican President George W. Bush won the county over Democratic John Kerry 59% to 37%. In 2008, however, Democrat Barack Obama won Salt Lake County by an extremely narrow margin, 48.17% to 48.09%, over Republican John McCain—a difference of 296 votes. It was the first time since 1964, when Lyndon B. Johnson was the Democratic candidate, that Salt Lake County had voted for a Democrat in a presidential race. In 2012, the Republicans recaptured the county, as Mitt Romney received 58% of the vote to Obama's 38%. In 2016, Democrat Hillary Clinton won the county with 41.5% of the vote, to Republican Donald Trump's 32.6% and Independent and Utah-native Evan McMullin's 25.9%—a much wider margin of over 35,000 votes. In 2020, Salt Lake County saw a strong Democratic trend when Joe Biden carried it with 53% of the vote. He was the first Democratic presidential candidate to win a majority of the county's vote since Johnson.

In 2004, the Constitutional Amendment 3 that defined marriage as between one man and one woman passed the county with 54.4% of the vote, only neighboring Summit County and Grand County in the eastern part of the state voting no on the amendment that passed statewide with 66% of the vote. Salt Lake County was the only county to vote in favor of the amendment where it did not receive more than 55% of the vote.

Democratic strength in the county is mainly concentrated in Salt Lake City and closer inner ring suburbs like South Salt Lake and Millcreek. Other inner ring suburbs in the I-215 corridor such as West Valley City tend to be swing towns. Sandy and West Jordan tend to lean more Republican, and the other outer-ring suburbs in the southern part of the county like South Jordan are strongly Republican.

The bulk of the county was for a long time located in the 2nd congressional district. However, after Utah gained a seat following the 2010 census redistricting, the Republican-controlled state legislature split the county into three districts – 2nd, 3rd and 4th. Despite that, from 2000 to 2020 Republicans controlled most of the county in Congress only for four years – from 2015 to 2019, after Jim Matheson, who survived two redistricting cycles following the 2000 and 2010 censuses, retired and was replaced by Mia Love, who in turn, was defeated by former county mayor Ben McAdams in the 2018 election. McAdams lost to Republican Burgess Owens in 2020, giving Republicans full control of the county’s districts. Salt Lake County was divided between all four of the state's districts after the 2020 census, and Republicans have held all of them since.

Only one Republican (Workman) has ever been elected county mayor. Since its inception, the county council has mostly been Republican-controlled, save for two years in 2009–2011, when Democrats had a narrow 5–4 majority following the 2008 election.

The county last voted for the Democratic candidate for governor in 2004, and for a Democratic Senate candidate in 1974, although, it voted for independent candidate Evan McMullin in 2022.

State elected offices
| Position | District | Name | Affiliation | First elected |
|---|---|---|---|---|
| Senate | 1 | Luz Escamilla | Democratic | 2008 |
| Senate | 2 | Derek Kitchen | Democratic | 2018 |
| Senate | 3 | Gene Davis | Democratic | 1998 |
| Senate | 4 | Jani Iwamoto | Democratic | 2014 |
| Senate | 5 | Karen Mayne | Democratic | 2008 |
| Senate | 6 | Wayne Harper | Republican | 2012 |
| Senate | 8 | Kathleen Riebe | Democratic | 2018 |
| Senate | 9 | Kirk Cullimore Jr. | Republican | 2018 |
| Senate | 10 | Lincoln Fillmore | Republican | 2015 |
| Senate | 11 | Daniel McCay | Republican | 2018 |
| Senate | 12 | Emily Buss | Forward | 2025 (Note: Appointed to replace Republican-turned-Forward Daniel Thatcher, who resigned in 2025.) |
| Senate | 13 | Jake Anderegg | Republican | 2016 |
| Senate | 23 | Todd Weiler | Republican | 2012 |
| House of Representatives | 22 | Clare Collard | Democratic | 2020 |
| House of Representatives | 21 | Sandra Hollins | Democratic | 2014 |
| House of Representatives | 24 | Jennifer Dailey-Provost | Democratic | 2018 |
| House of Representatives | 25 | Joel Briscoe | Democratic | 2010 |
| House of Representatives | 26 | Angela Romero | Democratic | 2012 |
| House of Representatives | 28 | Brian King | Democratic | 2008 |
| House of Representatives | 30 | Mike Winder | Republican | 2016 |
| House of Representatives | 31 | Elizabeth Weight | Democratic | 2016 |
| House of Representatives | 32 | Suzanne Harrison | Democratic | 2018 |
| House of Representatives | 33 | Judy Weeks Rohner | Republican | 2021 |
| House of Representatives | 34 | Karen Kwan | Democratic | 2016 |
| House of Representatives | 35 | Mark Wheatley | Democratic | 2004 |
| House of Representatives | 36 | Doug Owens | Democratic | 2020 |
| House of Representatives | 37 | Carol Spackman Moss | Democratic | 2000 |
| House of Representatives | 38 | Ashlee Matthews | Democratic | 2020 |
| House of Representatives | 39 | James Dunnigan | Republican | 2002 |
| House of Representatives | 40 | Stephanie Pitcher | Democratic | 2018 |
| House of Representatives | 41 | Mark Strong | Republican | 2018 |
| House of Representatives | 42 | Jordan Teuscher | Republican | 2020 |
| House of Representatives | 43 | Cheryl Acton | Republican | 2017 |
| House of Representatives | 44 | Andrew Stoddard | Democratic | 2018 |
| House of Representatives | 45 | Steve Eliason | Republican | 2010 |
| House of Representatives | 46 | Gay Lynn Bennion | Democratic | 2020 |
| House of Representatives | 47 | Vacant | N/A | TBA |
| House of Representatives | 49 | Robert Spendlove | Republican | 2014 |
| House of Representatives | 50 | Susan Pulsipher | Republican | 2016 |
| House of Representatives | 51 | Jeff Stenquist | Republican | 2018 |
| House of Representatives | 52 | Candice Pierucci | Republican | 2019 |
| Board of Education | 3 | Matt Hymas | Republican | 2020 |
| Board of Education | 5 | Laura Belnap | Nonpartisan | 2014 |
| Board of Education | 6 | Stacey Hutchings | Nonpartisan | 2021 |
| Board of Education | 7 | Carol Lear | Democratic | 2016 |
| Board of Education | 8 | Janet Cannon | Republican | 2020 |
| Board of Education | 10 | Molly Hart | Republican | 2020 |
| Board of Education | 11 | Natalie Cline | Republican | 2020 |

United States presidential election results for Salt Lake County, Utah
| Year | Republican | | Democratic | | Third party(ies) | |
| Year | No. | % | No. | % | No. | % |
|---|---|---|---|---|---|---|
| 1896 | 2,577 | 12.15% | 18,617 | 87.75% | 21 | 0.10% |
| 1900 | 13,496 | 50.15% | 12,840 | 47.72% | 573 | 2.13% |
| 1904 | 20,665 | 65.10% | 8,389 | 26.43% | 2,691 | 8.48% |
| 1908 | 20,805 | 58.02% | 12,954 | 36.12% | 2,100 | 5.86% |
| 1912 | 12,719 | 35.14% | 10,468 | 28.92% | 13,005 | 35.93% |
| 1916 | 17,593 | 35.05% | 30,707 | 61.18% | 1,889 | 3.76% |
| 1920 | 27,841 | 54.73% | 19,249 | 37.84% | 3,783 | 7.44% |
| 1924 | 27,215 | 46.44% | 14,853 | 25.35% | 16,534 | 28.21% |
| 1928 | 34,393 | 49.89% | 34,127 | 49.50% | 420 | 0.61% |
| 1932 | 32,224 | 39.16% | 48,012 | 58.34% | 2,056 | 2.50% |
| 1936 | 23,819 | 27.40% | 62,386 | 71.77% | 724 | 0.83% |
| 1940 | 35,427 | 34.42% | 67,318 | 65.40% | 181 | 0.18% |
| 1944 | 39,327 | 37.24% | 66,114 | 62.61% | 157 | 0.15% |
| 1948 | 52,479 | 44.89% | 62,957 | 53.85% | 1,481 | 1.27% |
| 1952 | 84,176 | 58.60% | 59,470 | 41.40% | 0 | 0.00% |
| 1956 | 95,179 | 64.22% | 53,038 | 35.78% | 0 | 0.00% |
| 1960 | 90,845 | 54.49% | 75,868 | 45.51% | 0 | 0.00% |
| 1964 | 78,118 | 42.91% | 103,926 | 57.09% | 0 | 0.00% |
| 1968 | 101,942 | 54.03% | 77,247 | 40.94% | 9,474 | 5.02% |
| 1972 | 132,066 | 62.99% | 68,489 | 32.67% | 9,111 | 4.35% |
| 1976 | 144,100 | 60.35% | 86,659 | 36.29% | 8,018 | 3.36% |
| 1980 | 169,411 | 67.00% | 58,472 | 23.13% | 24,952 | 9.87% |
| 1984 | 183,536 | 69.28% | 78,488 | 29.63% | 2,902 | 1.10% |
| 1988 | 163,557 | 59.07% | 107,453 | 38.81% | 5,893 | 2.13% |
| 1992 | 117,247 | 36.79% | 100,082 | 31.40% | 101,402 | 31.81% |
| 1996 | 127,951 | 45.51% | 117,951 | 41.95% | 35,275 | 12.55% |
| 2000 | 171,585 | 55.84% | 107,576 | 35.01% | 28,097 | 9.14% |
| 2004 | 215,728 | 59.57% | 135,949 | 37.54% | 10,461 | 2.89% |
| 2008 | 176,692 | 48.09% | 176,988 | 48.17% | 13,764 | 3.75% |
| 2012 | 223,811 | 58.26% | 146,147 | 38.04% | 14,216 | 3.70% |
| 2016 | 138,043 | 32.58% | 175,863 | 41.50% | 109,837 | 25.92% |
| 2020 | 230,174 | 42.53% | 289,906 | 53.57% | 21,095 | 3.90% |
| 2024 | 221,555 | 43.47% | 273,658 | 53.70% | 14,424 | 2.83% |

=== List of mayors of Salt Lake County ===
| # | Name | Took office | Left office | Party |
|---|---|---|---|---|
| 1 | Nancy Workman | 2000 | 2004 | Republican |
| 2 | Peter Corroon | 2004 | 2013 | Democratic |
| 3 | Ben McAdams | 2013 | 2019 | Democratic |
| 4 | Jenny Wilson | 2019 | | Democratic |

=== Other elected officials ===
In addition to a mayor and council, Salt Lake County has eight other officials elected to four-year terms. Current officeholders:

- Assessor — Chris Stavros (R)
- Auditor — Chris Harding (R)
- Clerk — Lannie Chapman (D)
- District Attorney — Sim Gill (D)
- Recorder — Rashelle Hobbs (D)
- Sheriff — Rosie Rivera (D)
- Surveyor — Reid J. Demman (R)
- Treasurer — K. Wayne Cushing (R)

== Economy ==
The region's economy traditionally revolved around LDS services and mining. While both are still important to the economy, each has greatly declined in significance since the 19th century. Since World War II, defense industries in the region have also played a very important role in the economy due to its strategic central location in the Western United States, as well as the largely uninhabited and desolate Great Salt Lake Desert to the west (used for training, weapons testing, and storage of hazardous materials).

Beginning in 1939, with the opening of Alta Ski Area, skiing and other winter sports (as well as summer sports), have become a major force in the economy. In 1995, Salt Lake City won the bid to host the 2002 Winter Olympics. The 2002 Olympics boosted tourism and the economy, and helped to dramatically improve transportation throughout the county. Transportation has been a major focus, as the county continues to rapidly grow in population. It was drastically improved beginning in the late 80s and through the 90s, and continues to this day. Beginning in the 1960s, a more service-oriented economy began to develop, and information technologies began to arrive in the 80s and 90s. Although this business has waned in recent years, information and computer companies, such as iBAHN, InContact, Mstar, Opengear, and Overstock.com are still thriving businesses here.

Northrop Grumman is building solid rocket motors in Magna.

== Education ==
The county has one major research university, the University of Utah. Westminster College and Salt Lake Community College also have large, well defined campuses in the county. Colleges with smaller, non-traditional campuses in the county include Roseman University of Health Sciences, Broadview University, Eagle Gate College, Ensign College, Midwives College of Utah, Neumont University, and Stevens-Henager College.

Salt Lake County includes five separate public school districts: Salt Lake City, Canyon, Granite, Jordan, and Murray.

Salt Lake City and Murray operate their own school districts (although a recent annexation by Murray leaves a part of the city within the Granite School District). The Granite School District, the third largest in the state, is a broad district that covers a swath from Magna , Kearns, and Taylorsville through West Valley City and eastward to South Salt Lake and Millcreek. The Jordan School District, with approximately 48,000 students, covers the southwest part of the county, including most of West Jordan, South Jordan, Riverton, Herriman, Bluffdale, and Copperton.

On November 6, 2007, the east side residents of the Jordan School District in Sandy, Draper, Midvale, Cottonwood Heights, Alta, and nearby unincorporated areas voted to split from the Jordan District, creating the Canyons School District. A similar vote to make West Jordan its own district, however, failed.

Public high schools in Salt Lake County
| School | District | Location |
|---|---|---|
| Alta High School | Canyons | Sandy |
| Bingham High School | Jordan | South Jordan |
| Brighton High School | Canyons | Cottonwood Heights |
| Copper Hills High School | Jordan | West Jordan |
| Corner Canyon High School | Canyons | Draper |
| Cottonwood High School | Granite | Murray |
| Cyprus High School | Granite | Magna |
| East High School | Salt Lake City | Salt Lake City |
| Granger High School | Granite | West Valley City |
| Herriman High School | Jordan | Herriman |
| Highland High School | Salt Lake City | Salt Lake City |
| Hillcrest High School | Canyons | Midvale |
| Hunter High School | Granite | West Valley City |
| Jordan High School | Canyons | Sandy |
| Kearns High School | Granite | Kearns |
| Mountain Ridge High School | Jordan | Herriman |
| Murray High School | Murray | Murray |
| Olympus High School | Granite | Holladay |
| Riverton High School | Jordan | Riverton |
| Skyline High School | Granite | Millcreek |
| Taylorsville High School | Granite | Taylorsville |
| West High School | Salt Lake City | Salt Lake City |
| West Jordan High School | Jordan | West Jordan |

Two high schools have closed:

- South High School in Salt Lake City closed in 1988; it is now occupied by the City Campus of the Salt Lake Community College (SLCC).
- Granite High School in South Salt Lake was reformed into an alternative school in 2006, although it remained a public school. However, this venture was not a financial success and the school closed in 2009. The school building was demolished in 2018 in preparation for the site to be redeveloped. The site is now the location of Salt Lake County Library's Granite branch.

Non-traditional public high schools also include Horizonte and Valley, which was at one time located in the historic Crescent Elementary School building.

In addition, the Roman Catholic Diocese of Salt Lake City operates eight elementary schools, one middle school, two high schools, and two preschools in Salt Lake County. Judge Memorial Catholic High School in Salt Lake City is the largest Catholic high school in Utah. The Catholic Church also operates Juan Diego High School in Draper.

Intermountain Christian School is the only PS-12 independent Christian School in Salt Lake County.

Salt Lake County also has several independent schools including:

- Rowland Hall
- Waterford School
- Intermountain Christian School

Salt Lake County is home to the Bastian Agricultural and Equestrian Center, which also serves as an extension and distance education location for Utah State University.

== Infrastructure ==
=== Transportation ===
Because the restricted geography permits only four major entrances to the Salt Lake Valley, routes for long-distance travel through the valley are mainly confined to an east–west strip through Salt Lake City and South Salt Lake and a north–south strip near the Jordan River. These corridors cross in the area between South Salt Lake and Downtown Salt Lake City and together form a latin cross of transportation infrastructure that is almost perfectly oriented north-to-south.

==== Air transportation ====
Salt Lake City International Airport is the only airport with scheduled passenger service in the county, and South Valley Regional Airport is the only other public airport. Another small airport, Skypark Airport, is just to the north of Salt Lake County. Salt Lake City International Airport is the 24th-busiest airport in the United States and a hub of Delta Air Lines and SkyWest Airlines. In 2014, construction began on a major renovation and expansion project. The initial phase was completed in 2020, with expansion phases completing periodically between then and 2026.

==== Railroads ====
Union Pacific controls all long-distance freight tracks into the county, though the Utah Railway, BNSF, and Salt Lake, Garfield, and Western have long-standing trackage rights. The Salt Lake City Southern and Savage Bingham and Garfield railroads operate totally within the county. All four major entrances to the Salt Lake Valley once carried rail traffic, but only railroads at the north, south, and west entrances to the valley exist today as the line in Parley's Canyon was never built to high standards and was covered by Interstate 80 in the mid-20th century. All three of these entrances carry passenger trains as well as freight.

Amtrak's California Zephyr runs daily in both directions between Garfield and Point of the Mountain via Salt Lake City Station (on its route between Emeryville, California and Chicago, Illinois).

==== Rail mass transit ====
The Utah Transit Authority's (UTA) FrontRunner commuter rail line provides all-day service to Ogden (with select peak hour trips going to Pleasant View) to the north (via Davis County) and Provo to the south.

A light rail system, known as TRAX, is operated by the Utah Transit Authority (UTA) and currently has three lines. The Blue Line runs from Downtown Salt Lake City to Draper), the Red Line from South Jordan to the University of Utah, and the Green Line from West Valley City to the Salt Lake City International Airport (via Downtown Salt Lake City). There are currently 50 stops in the system. The original line opened in 1999 from downtown to Sandy, with the line to the University of Utah completed in 2001, and to West Valley City and South Jordan in 2011. In April 2013 the extension to the airport (Airport Station) on the Green Line opened and the extension to Draper (Draper Town Center Station) on the Blue Line opened in August 2013.

An historic streetcar was proposed along 2100 South from the TRAX station to the historic business district in the Sugar House neighborhood. The proposal was refined and in December 2013, a modern (S Line) light rail track was completed and is operated by UTA. A future extension is planned to run north along Highland Drive and 1100 East to 1700 South.

==== Roads ====
The county is traversed by three Interstate Highways and one U.S. Highway, as well as an additional freeway and one major expressway. US-89 enters from Davis County to the north and traverses the county arrow-straight until merging with I-15 in north Draper. It is known as State Street along most of the route and is the primary surface road in the valley. I-15 and I-80 intersect just west of Downtown Salt Lake City, merging for approximately 3 miles (4.8 km) north-to-south. I-80 continues west past the Salt Lake City International Airport and east through Parley's Canyon and into the Wasatch Range. I-15 traverses the valley north-to-south, providing access to the entire urban corridor. The freeway is 10–12 lanes wide after a major expansion project from 1998 to 2001 undertaken in preparation for the 2002 Winter Olympics. I-215 directly serves many of the suburbs of Salt Lake City in the western, central, and eastern portions of the valley in a 270° loop. SR-201, alternatively known as the "21st South Freeway", provides access to West Valley City and the west side of the valley. Bangerter Highway (SR-154) is an expressway that traverses the entire western end of the valley from the airport, ending at I-15 in southern Draper. SR-68, or Redwood Road, is the only surface street that traverses the entire valley from north-to-south. The Legacy Parkway opened in 2008 to connect with I-215 at the north end of the valley, providing an alternative route into Davis County to alleviate congestion. The Mountain View Corridor is a limited-access highway across the southwestern part of the county; construction began in 2010 and it was put into operation in stages.

The Utah Transit Authority operates bus routes throughout the valley and along the Wasatch Front, to Park City and Tooele, and to the ski resorts in winter.

==== Pedestrian and bicycle trails ====
The Jordan River Parkway trail (and its northern extension, the Legacy Parkway trail) runs north–south in the center of the valley from Utah County to Davis County (though it has a few gaps), and the planned Crosstown and Parley's trails will together form the primary east–west route from Parley's Canyon to Garfield. The Bonneville Shoreline Trail runs along the face of the Wasatch mountains, skirting the edge of the built up areas of the east bench, though there are large gaps in the central part of the county. A large number of more remote trails provide access throughout the Wasatch-Cache National Forest.

=== Health care ===
The largest health care providers in the county are Intermountain Health Care and University of Utah Healthcare, though three major hospitals (St Mark's, Pioneer Valley, and the Veterans Affairs Hospital) are run by other organizations. Hospitals in the county include:

- Alta View Hospital
- George E. Wahlen VA Medical Center
- Huntsman Cancer Hospital
- Intermountain Medical Center
- Holy Cross Hospital - Salt Lake (Formerly Salt Lake Regional Medical Center)
- Holy Cross Hospital - Jordan Valley West (Formerly known as Jordan Valley Hospital)
- LDS Hospital
- Pioneer Valley Hospital
- Primary Children's Medical Center
- Shriners Hospital
- St Mark's Hospital
- The Orthopedic Specialty Hospital
- University of Utah Hospital

== Communities ==
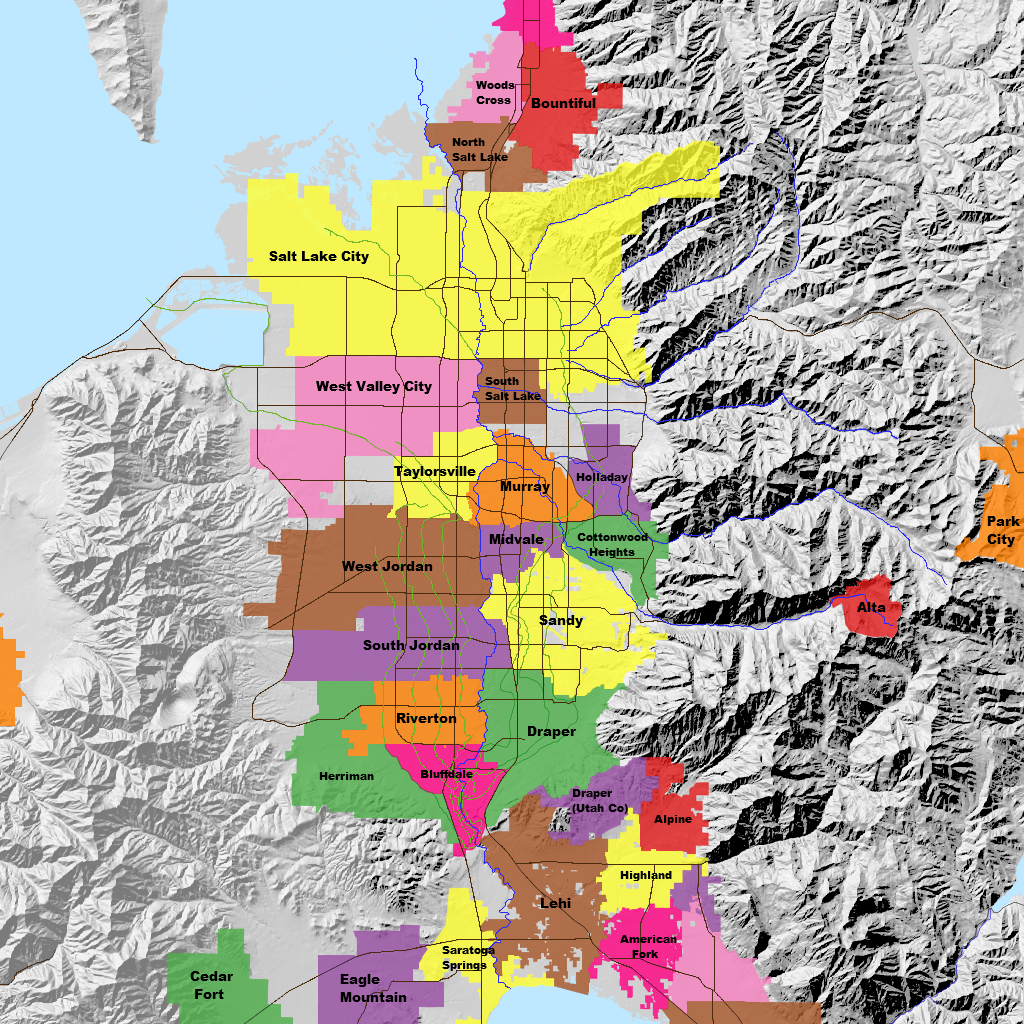
Map of Salt Lake Valley, Utah with cities as of 2010. Rivers and creeks are in blue. Canals are in green

Map of Salt Lake County municipalities and CDPs

=== Cities ===
- Bluffdale
- Cottonwood Heights
- Draper
- Emigration Canyon
- Herriman
- Holladay
- Kearns
- Magna
- Midvale
- Millcreek
- Murray
- Riverton
- Salt Lake City (county seat)
- Sandy
- South Jordan
- South Salt Lake
- Taylorsville
- West Jordan
- West Valley City
- White City

=== Towns ===
- Alta
- Brighton
- Copperton

=== Unincorporated communities ===
- Mount Aire

==== Community councils ====
- Big Cottonwood Canyon
- Granite (also a CDP)
- Parley's Canyon
- Sandy Hills and Willow Canyon (enclaves of Sandy)
- Southwest (area south of Copperton and South Jordan and west of Herriman)

=== Former communities ===
- Arthur
- Bacchus
- Bingham Canyon, incorporated 1904, disincorporated 1971. The last buildings were razed in 1972 as the Bingham Canyon Mine absorbed the town. At its peak the population was around 15,000.
- Emmaville
- Forest Dale, incorporated 1902, disincorporated 1912 and subsequently annexed by Salt Lake City.
- Garfield
- Lark was a small town on the southwest side of the valley that was dismantled in 1978 to make way for overburden from the Bingham Canyon Mine. At its peak the population was around 800.
- Mountain Dell
- Riter started out as a station on the San Pedro, Los Angeles, and Salt Lake Railroad in 1905 and a town formed in its vicinity. In 1918, the town and station were buried by an expansion of one of Kennecott's tailings ponds west of Magna. The station was moved north but in 1996 the location was again buried by another expansion of the tailings pond although by that time Riter was only a siding and there were no buildings there.
- Welby

== Notable people ==
- Parley Parker Christensen, Utah and California politician, county attorney
- John Paul Kennedy, retired Third Judicial District court judge

== See also ==
- National Register of Historic Places listings in Salt Lake County, Utah
- Unified Police Department of Greater Salt Lake, police department for unincorporated Salt Lake County
- Salt Lake County Sheriff's Office

== Other sources ==
- Murphy, Miriam B. (1994), "Salt Lake County", Utah History Encyclopedia, University of Utah Press, ISBN 9780874804256, archived from the original on March 21, 2024
- Sillitoe, Linda (1996). A History of Salt Lake County. Salt Lake City: Utah Historical Society. ISBN 0-913738-04-2
- Utah Catholic Schools
