= Canyons School District =

Public school district in Utah, United States

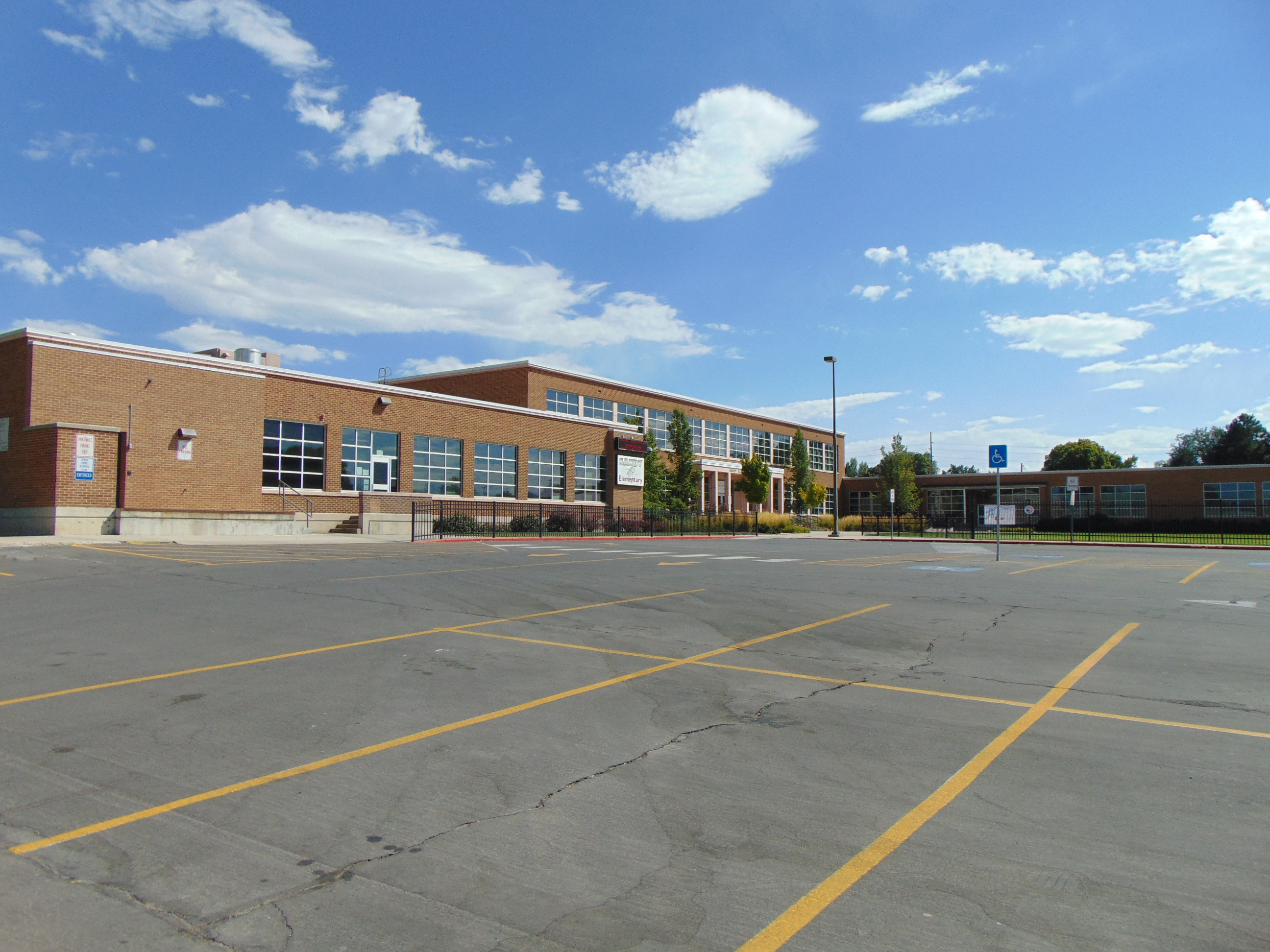
- Sandy Elementary School

Address
- 9361 South 300 East Sandy, Salt Lake County, Utah, 84070; United States

District information
- Type: Public
- Grades: PreK–12
- Superintendent: Rick L. Robins
- NCES District ID: 4900142

Students and staff
- Students: 34,383

Other information
- Website: www.canyonsdistrict.org

Canyons School District is a school district in the southeastern portion of Salt Lake County in Utah, United States.

The district includes the municipalities of Alta, Brighton, White City, Cottonwood Heights, Midvale and Sandy; as well as the portions of Draper that are within Salt Lake County. Portions of Draper within Utah County are part of the Alpine School District.

Residents of those communities voted to create the district in 2007, in a split from the Jordan School District, making Canyons the first school district to be formed in the state in almost a century. Canyons has approximately 34,000 students in 50 schools as of 2014. There are 29 elementary schools, eight middle schools, five traditional high schools, and eight special programs schools, including one technical school, a special education school and a high school for adults in prison. The district covers 192 square miles and employs 6,000 people.

The district officially started operating on July 1, 2009, with students attending Canyons schools for the first time that fall.

== History ==
Canyons District was created after residents voted in 2007 to leave the Jordan School District, which was the largest district in Utah at the time. David Doty, a former high school Spanish teacher and assistant commissioner and director of policy studies for the Utah System of Higher Education, was chosen by the new board of education to be the district's first superintendent.

In June 2013, Doty resigned his position to join an education consulting firm. Deputy superintendent Ginger Rhode was appointed as interim superintendent. After a national search, James Briscoe became superintendent on July 1, 2014. In July 2020, Rick Robins was appointed as CSD's new superintendent, replacing Briscoe, who retired. Robins came to Canyons from Juab School District, where he was superintendent for six years.

The Canyons Board of Education includes Ann Shill - District 2, Kristine Millerberg - District 1, Amanda Oaks - District 6, Nancy Tingey - District 3, Andrew Edtl - District 4, Karen Pedersen - District 5, Holly Neibar, District 7.

== Boundary ==
Canyons includes Alta, Brighton, Cottonwood Heights, Midvale, Sandy, White City, and the portion of Draper in Salt Lake County.

== Assets, bonds and debt ==
Canyons School District and Jordan School District entered an arbitration process to divide assets between the two districts after Canyons' creation. As a result of that process, Canyons School District received 41 percent of the overall assets, based on student population. Canyons also agreed to pay 58 percent of a $281 million bond debt — incurred in 2003 by the formerly combined district — until 2022. Voters approved tax-rate-neutral bonds of $250 million in 2010 and $283 million in 2017 for repairs, rebuilds and upgrades to facilities throughout the district.

== Schools ==
=== High schools ===
- Alta High School (Sandy)
- Brighton High School (Cottonwood Heights)
- Corner Canyon High School (Draper)
- Hillcrest High School (Midvale)
- Diamond Ridge High School
- Jordan High School (Sandy)

=== Middle schools ===
- Albion Middle School (Sandy)
- Butler Middle School (Cottonwood Heights)
- Draper Park Middle School (Draper)
- Eastmont Middle School (Sandy)
- Indian Hills Middle School (Sandy)
- Midvale Middle School (Midvale)
- Mount Jordan Middle School (Sandy)
- Union Middle School (Sandy)

=== Elementary schools ===
- Alta View Elementary School (White City)
- Altara Elementary School (Sandy)
- Bella Vista Elementary School (Cottonwood Heights)
- Brookwood Elementary School (Sandy)
- Butler Elementary School (Cottonwood Heights)
- Canyon View Elementary School (Cottonwood Heights)
- Copperview Elementary School (Midvale)
- Crescent Elementary School (Sandy)
- Draper Elementary School (Draper)
- East Midvale Elementary School (Midvale)
- East Sandy Elementary School (Sandy)
- Glacier Hills Elementary School (Sandy)
- Granite Elementary School (Sandy)
- Lone Peak Elementary School (Sandy)
- Midvale Elementary School (Midvale)
- Midvalley Elementary School (Midvale)
- Oak Hollow Elementary School (Draper)
- Oakdale Elementary School (Sandy)
- Park Lane Elementary School (Sandy)
- Peruvian Park Elementary School (Sandy)
- Quail Hollow Elementary School (Sandy)
- Ridgecrest Elementary School (Cottonwood Heights)
- Sandy Elementary School (Sandy)
- Silver Mesa Elementary School (Sandy)
- Sprucewood Elementary School (Sandy)
- Sunrise Elementary School (Sandy)
- Willow Canyon Elementary School (Sandy)
- Willow Springs Elementary School (Draper)
- Goldminer's Daughter Lodge (satellite school in Alta Township)

=== Specialty schools ===
- Canyons Online
- Canyons Technical Education Center (CTEC)
- Canyons Transition Academy
- Canyons Virtual Academy
- Entrada Adult High School
- Jordan Valley School
