= Crescent Elementary School =

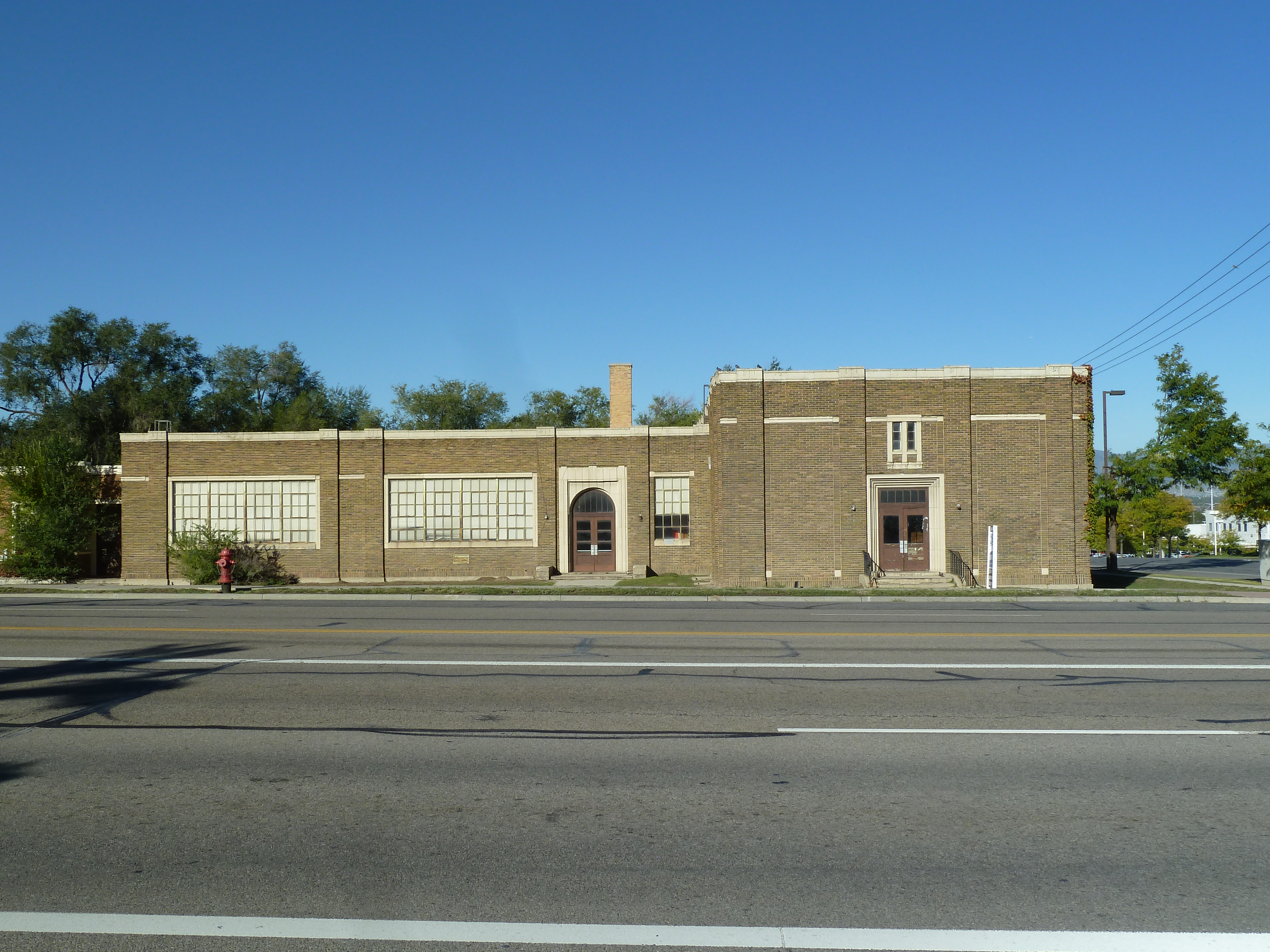

Location
- 11100 S 230 E Sandy, Utah; Sandy, Salt Lake, Utah 84070; United States
- Coordinates: 40.549511°N 111.885651°W

Information
- Established: 1930
- School district: Canyons School District
- Colours: Blue, white
- Nickname: Cubs
- Website: http://crescent.canyonsdistrict.org/

Crescent Elementary School is a public school located in the Crescent neighborhood of Sandy, Utah. It is included on the National Register of Historic Places.

== History ==
Crescent Elementary School was built in 1930 and was originally located at the corner of 11000 S and State Street in Sandy, Utah. Due to its large auditorium, it also functioned as a community center in the early days of the community. It functioned as an elementary school until 1976 when a new school was built at 11100 South 230 East and named Crescent Elementary School. The building became Valley High School, an alternative high school for the Jordan School District. Sometime later, Valley High School was moved to a new building 325 W 11000 S and the building is currently the centerpiece of the Schoolyard development by the Woodbury Group. The 1950s addition was demolished while the historic portions were developed into a Shake Shack (Utah's first) which opened in August 2019 and office space. A Mo Bettah's Hawaiian restaurant, GOAT haircuts, and Vessel Kitchen also make up part of the development in a separate building mirroring the appearance of the school which opened in late 2019 and early 2020.

In 2021, the auditorium portion of this historic building was renovated into a popular event venue named Crescent Hall (named after the original Crescent Elementary School). Special attention was given to restore and preserve the original architecture & charm of the building.
