= Midwives College of Utah =

College in Salt Lake County, Utah

Coordinates: 40°42′44″N 111°51′25″W

The Midwives College of Utah, formerly the Utah School of Midwifery, is an institution of direct-entry midwifery training that is headquartered in Salt Lake City, Utah but offers all programs completely online.

Founded in 1980, it is one of the largest and longest-standing direct-entry (out-of-hospital) midwifery programs in the nation. It has been accredited through the Midwifery Education Accreditation Council (MEAC) since 1996, which is approved by the U.S. Secretary of Education as a nationally recognized accrediting agency. The school is also accepted by the California Medical Board for state licensure.

The college offers a Bachelor of Science in Midwifery and a Master of Science in Midwifery. Students are eligible to take the North American Registry of Midwives (NARM) exam upon graduation and receive the designation of Certified Professional Midwife (CPM).
