= Holy Cross Hospital - Jordan Valley West =

Holy Cross Hospital- West Valley
- CommonSpirit Health

Geography
- Location: 3460 South Pioneer Parkway (4155 West); West Valley City, Utah, United States
- Coordinates: 40°41′52″N 111°59′27″W

Services
- Beds: 102

History
- Founded: 1963; 63 years ago

Links
- Website: www.jordanwestvalley.org

Holy Cross Hospital - West Valley, formerly Jordan Valley Medical Center West Valley Campus is a community hospital located in West Valley City, Utah, United States.

The hospital offers general medical and surgical care, general intensive care, cardiac intensive care, a cardiology department, pediatric medical and surgical care, obstetrics, an orthopedics department, and a 25-bed emergency department.

Holy Cross Hospital- West Valley has 102 licensed beds. Opened in 1964 under the name Valley West Hospital, the medical center was purchased by Iasis Healthcare in 1999.

In May 2023, CommonSpirit Health acquired the hospital and four other Utah hospitals previously controlled by Steward Health Care. Now managed by the Catholic health system maintained by CommonSpirit Health, the facility has come to be known as Holy Cross Hospital - West Valley.

Holy Cross Hospital- West Valley is recognized by CMS with a 4-star rating. The Leapfrog group has awarded the hospital with a Letter A score for their quality metrics. They are a stroke center, STEMI center (Heart attacks), and serve the community as a Level 3 Trauma Center. They have a state of the art Cardiac Catheterization Suite and expert clinicians to serve the community needs.

== See also ==
- List of hospitals in Utah
