= White City, Utah =

- City
- Location in Salt Lake County and the state of Utah.
- Coordinates: 40°34′16″N 111°51′47″W
- Country: United States
- State: Utah
- County: Salt Lake
- Founded: 1955
- Granted Township Status: September 26, 2006
- Incorporated as a Metro Township: January 1, 2017
- Incorporated as a City: May 1, 2024
- Founder: M. Kenneth White
- Named for: M. Kenneth White

Area
  - Total: 0.87 sq mi (2.26 km^{2})
  - Land: 0.87 sq mi (2.26 km^{2})
  - Water: 0 sq mi (0.00 km^{2})
- Elevation: 4,564 ft (1,391 m)

Population (2020)
  - Total: 5,522
  - Density: 6,330/sq mi (2,440/km^{2})
- Time zone: UTC-7 (Mountain (MST))
  - Summer (DST): UTC-6 (MDT)
- ZIP code: 84070
- Area codes: 385, 801
- FIPS code: 49-84050
- GNIS feature ID: 2409582
- Website: whitecity.utah.gov

White City is a city in Salt Lake County, Utah, United States. The city is an enclave of Sandy. The population was 5,522 at the 2020 census, a modest increase from the 2010 population of 5,407.

== Geography ==
According to the United States Census Bureau, the city has a total area of 0.9 square miles (2.3 km^{2}), all land.

== Demographics ==
Historical population
Census	Pop.	Note	%±
1980	7,188		—
1990	6,506		−9.5%
2000	5,988		−8.0%
2010	5,407		−9.7%
2020	5,522		2.1%

As of the census of 2000, there were 5,988 people, 1,796 households, and 1,549 families residing in the township. The population density was 6,912.5 people per square mile (2,668.9 people/km^{2}). There were 1,834 housing units at an average density of 2,117.2 units per square mile (817.5 units/km^{2}). The racial makeup of the township was 92.30% White, 0.47% African American, 0.67% Native American, 0.82% Asian, 0.82% Pacific Islander, 2.94% from other races, and 1.99% from two or more races. Hispanic or Latino of any race were 7.35% of the population.

There were 1,796 households, out of which 41.3% had children under the age of 18 living with them, 69.8% were married couples living together, 11.5% had a female householder with no husband present, and 13.7% were non-families. 10.2% of all households were made up of individuals, and 2.8% had someone living alone who was 65 years of age or older. The average household size was 3.33 and the average family size was 3.55.

In the township the population was spread out, with 30.9% under the age of 18, 11.2% from 18 to 24, 29.2% from 25 to 44, 19.9% from 45 to 64, and 8.8% who were 65 years of age or older. The median age was 30 years. For every 100 females, there were 102.4 males. For every 100 females age 18 and over, there were 99.2 males.

The median income for a household in the township was $49,103, and the median income for a family was $50,156. Males had a median income of $34,871 versus $25,743 for females. The per capita income for the township was $17,148. About 3.1% of families and 3.3% of the population were below the poverty line, including 1.9% of those under age 18 and 4.9% of those age 65 or over.

== See also ==
- List of census-designated places in Utah
