= Salt Lake, Garfield and Western Railway =

Railways in Salt Lake City

Salt Lake, Garfield & Western
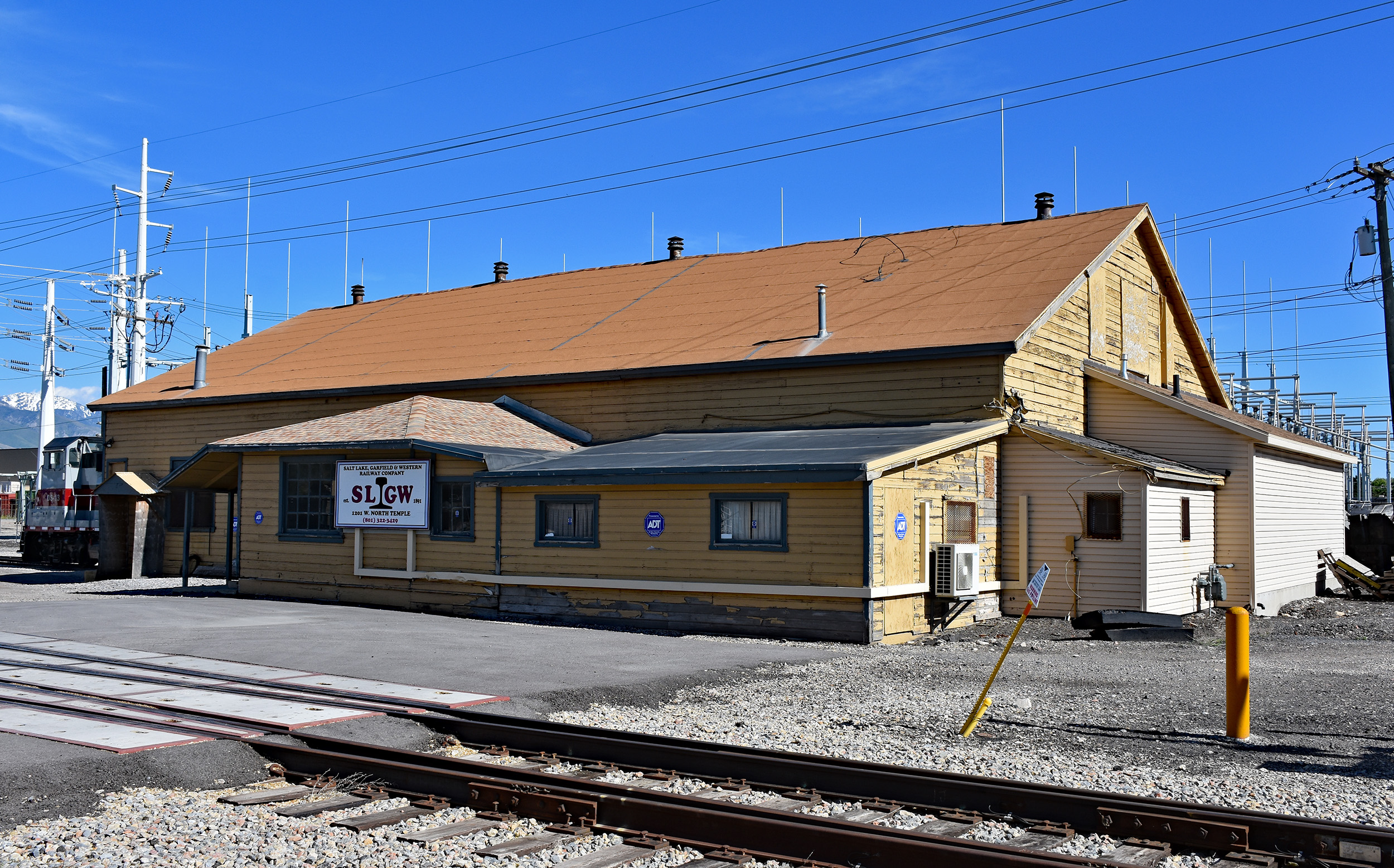
- The railroad's maintenance facility and offices

Overview
- Headquarters: 1201 West North Temple Salt Lake City, UT
- Reporting mark: SLGW
- Locale: Salt Lake City, Utah
- Dates of operation: 1891–Present

Technical
- Track gauge: 4 ft 8 1/2 in (1,435 mm) standard gauge
- Length: 10 miles, plus 6 miles secondary track

The Salt Lake, Garfield & Western Railway (reporting mark SLGW), nicknamed through most of its history as The Saltair Route, is a shortline railroad located in Salt Lake City, Utah. Originally incorporated as a dual passenger and freight railroad, it now provides freight-only railcar switching services to industries in Salt Lake City along its sixteen miles of track.

== History ==
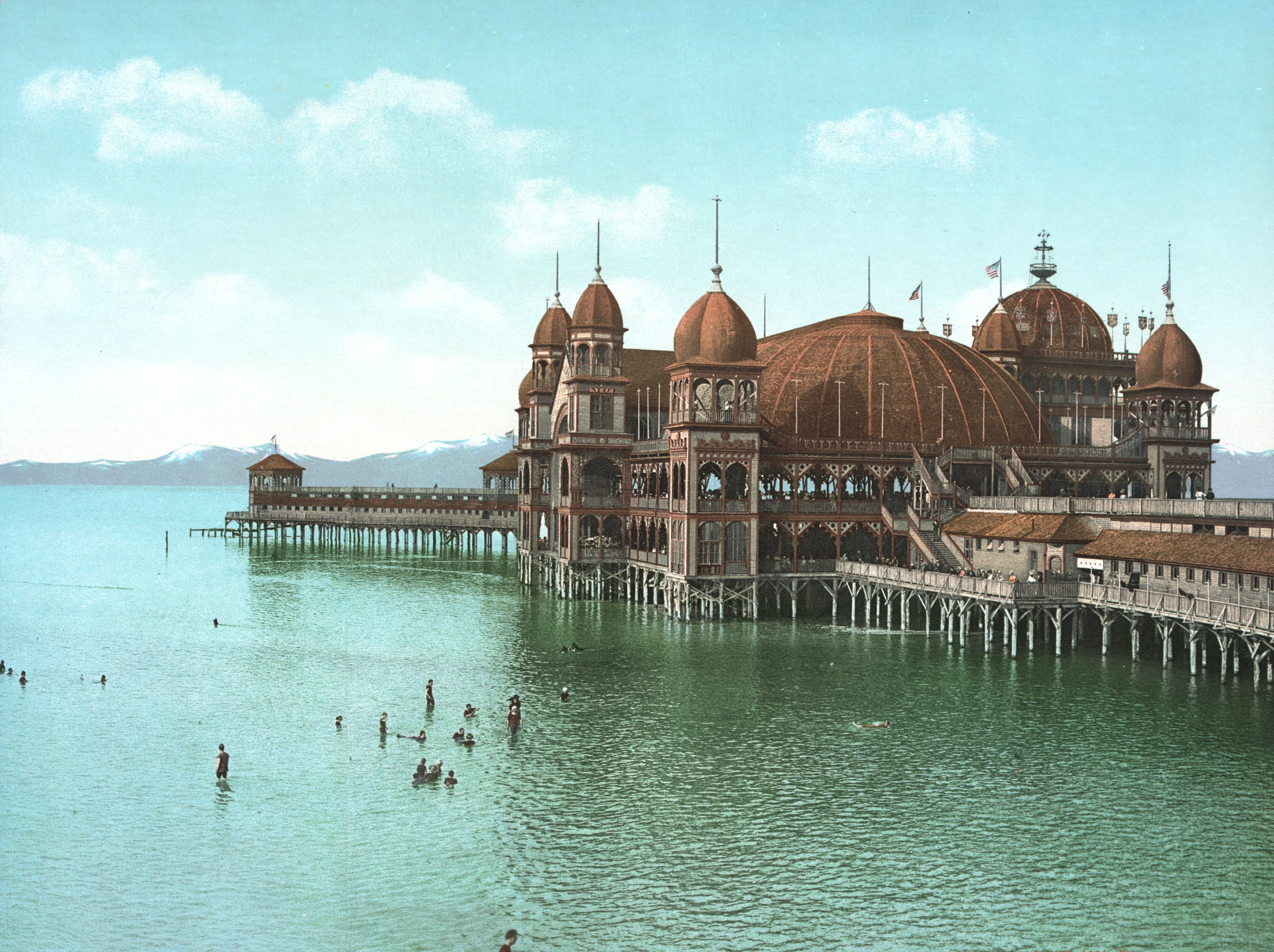
The Saltair Resort in 1900

The SLGW was incorporated on September 6, 1891, as the Saltair Railway, with the express purpose of tapping the tourist market visiting the Saltair Beach Resort on the shores of the Great Salt Lake. It was reorganized as the Salt Lake & Los Angeles Railroad in April 1892, and renamed soon after the Salt Lake, Garfield & Western Railway. The line carried passengers to Saltair and freight to the mining area of Garfield, Utah including Morton Salt located on the shores of the Great Salt Lake. On June 8, 1893, the Saltair Resort was officially opened. Saltair was founded and owned originally by The Church of Jesus Christ of Latter-day Saints, but was later transferred to the railroad under the ownership of the Snow Family, and the railroad was sold to the Hogle family in the early 1960s. For many years passenger traffic to the Saltair Resort was the line's biggest source of revenue. The line was electrified in 1916, a project that was completed in 1919. The Garfield Station was built approximately one mile from the Garfield town itself. Service to the Garfield station smelter industry ended in 1930, but continued to Morton Salt and other rail freight customers from Salt Lake City to the shores of the Great Salt Lake. The railroad provided significant passenger tourist traffic, with trains of 12-16 passenger cars leaving to and from Saltair every 45 minutes. in 1933, the Great Salt Lake reached its lowest recorded levels, stranding the Saltair Beach Resort from the waterline. To make up for the loss of patronage due to the low water levels, a roller coaster was constructed, as well as a short railroad from the pavilion to the water using gasoline-powered speeders to carry patrons across the brine flat. in 1955, a fire consumed the bath houses; and in 1957 the roller coaster burned as well. The resort finally closed permanently in 1959, and the Salt Lake, Garfield & Western ceased passenger operations. The first diesel locomotive on the line was purchased in 1951, and was a GE 44-tonner. In July 1954 the railroad leased a GE centercab diesel from U.S. Steel, and this marked the end of electric operations on the Salt Lake, Garfield & Western. The SLGW continues to haul freight to this day along its 16 miles of track with additional sidings for railcar storage, transloading, railcar cleaning, rail served warehousing and other rail-related services.

On October 13, 2017, Stadler Rail broke ground for a new manufacturing shop alongside the SLGW. The factory will be used to build commuter rail units such as the Stadler FLIRT for use in the United States. In 2021 the railroad was purchased by Patriot Rail Company. In 2025, BNSF opened a new intermodal terminal on the SLGW, following a brief trackage rights dispute with Union Pacific.

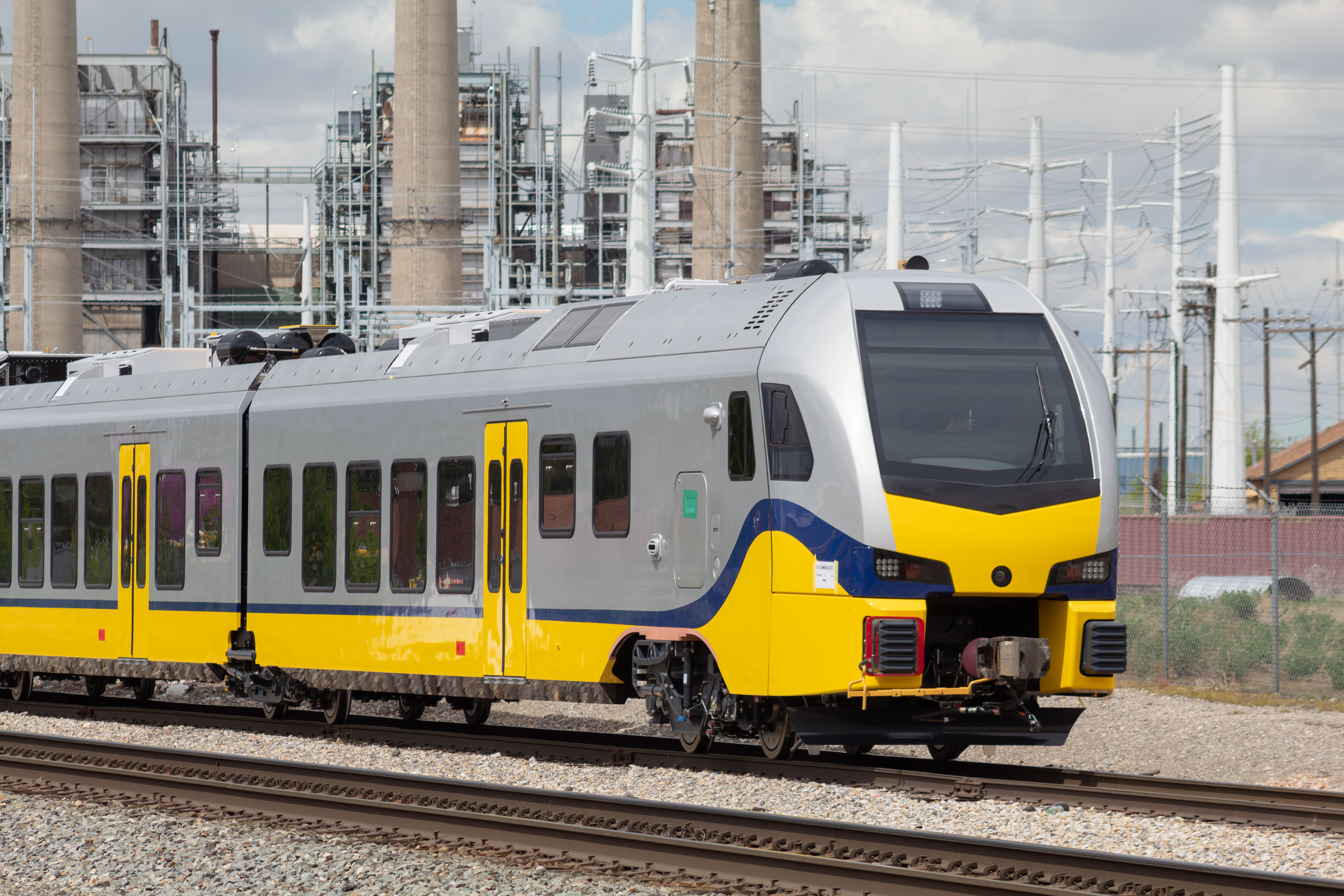
A Stadler FLIRT DMU, painted in DART Silver Line colors at rest on the Salt Lake Garfield & Western Railway.

== Current operations ==
The SLGW is dual-served by the two major mainline U.S. railroads, Union Pacific and BNSF. SLGW receives freight cars at its main switching yard at 1200 West and North Temple Street in Salt Lake City, near the Utah State Fairgrounds. Commodities vary and include lumber, cement, plastics, petroleum products, paper, frozen juices, canned goods, furniture, waste oil and others. Occasionally, the line will pull a passenger special car owned by the Promontory Chapter of the National Railway Historical Society, who use a section of SLGW track to store or rehab historic rail cars.

== Motive power ==
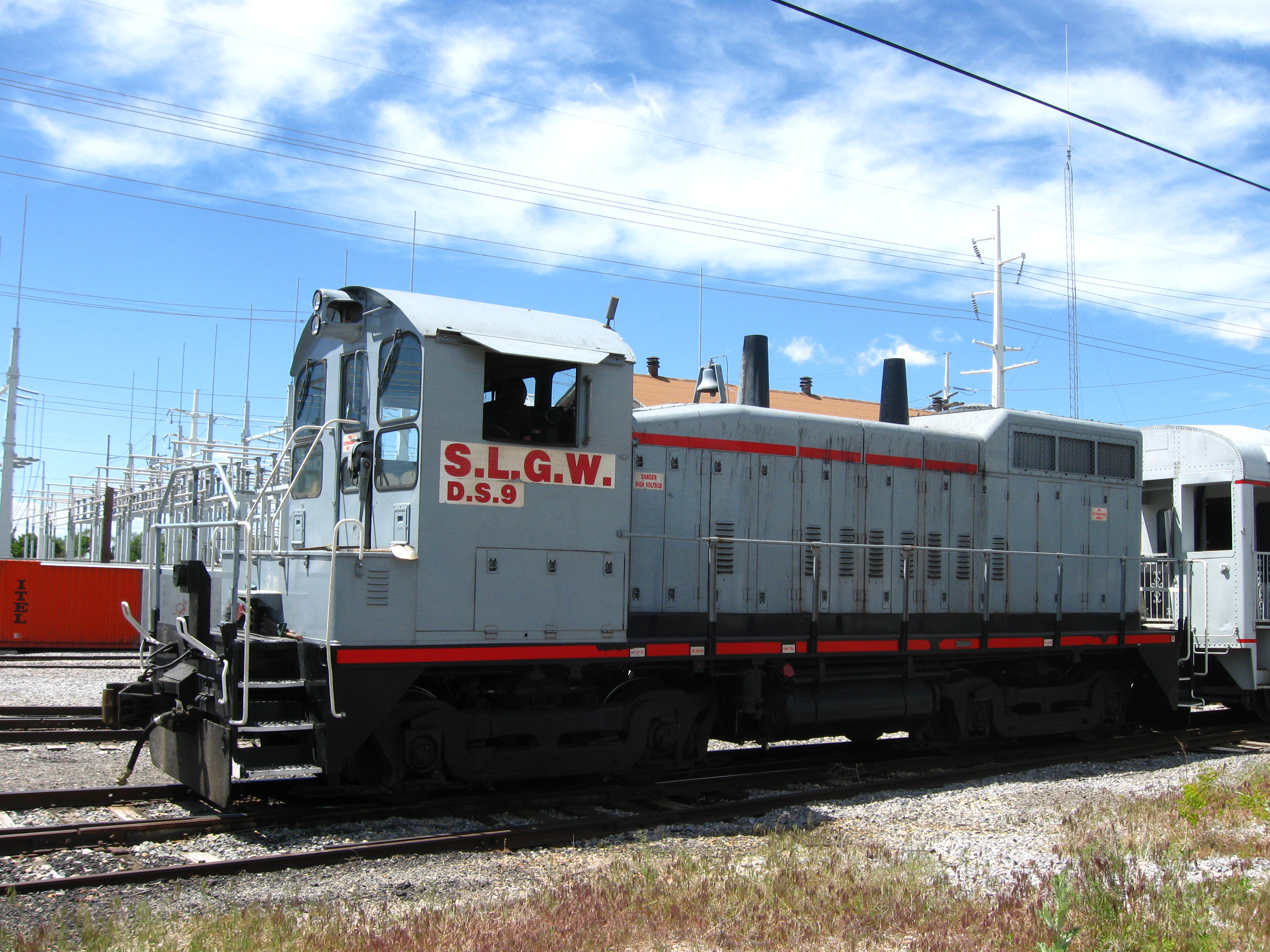
SLG&W D.S.9, an ex-Union Pacific SW10

The first SLGW locomotive, a steam-driven Rhode Island Locomotive Works 4-4-0, was delivered on May 24, 1892, and was tested by the Rio Grande Western before being placed into revenue service. Numbered 1, it weighed 45 tons, had 17X24-inch cylinders, and 62-inch drivers. A second identical locomotive, numbered 2, was received in April of the following year. A third locomotive, also a 4-4-0 but built by the Pittsburgh Locomotive Works, was delivered in 1906. No. 1 was retired in 1919, and Nos. 2 and 3 were retired in 1921. Until electrification, the SL&LA owned only these three locomotives. During times of peak business, the SLGW leased passenger locomotives from the Rio Grande Western and the Oregon Short Line to facilitate the operation of extra trains.

The only electric freight locomotive was No. 401, former Salt Lake & Utah 104, purchased in 1946. A total of six powered McGuire-Cummings interurban cars were delivered in 1918, which were also used to haul freight. Two of the MucGuire-Cummings cars, when operated in Multiple Unit, could pull 40 fully loaded boxcars. The electric equipment ran on a charge of 1500 volts, delivered via single-suspension double-line poles.

A total of thirteen diesel locomotives were owned and operated by the SLG&W during its independent years, starting with D.S. 1 purchased in December 1951. In addition, motor car MC-3, built by American Car & Foundry and purchased by the SLG&W in 1951, was used to supplement the diesel-powered passenger trains. This car was later sold to the California Western and is still in operation as M-300. From 2017 until 2019 the line operated three locomotives, D.S. 9 and 10, both ex-Union Pacific SW10 diesel-electric locomotives; and D.S. 11 an ex-Southern Pacific EMD MP15AC locomotive which arrived on the railroad June 14, 2017. In late 2019 the railroad acquired an ex-Kennecott Copper GP39-2 locomotive (D.S. 13), and acquired an EMD MP15DC locomotive (D.S. 12), retiring the two SW10 locomotives by the end of the year.

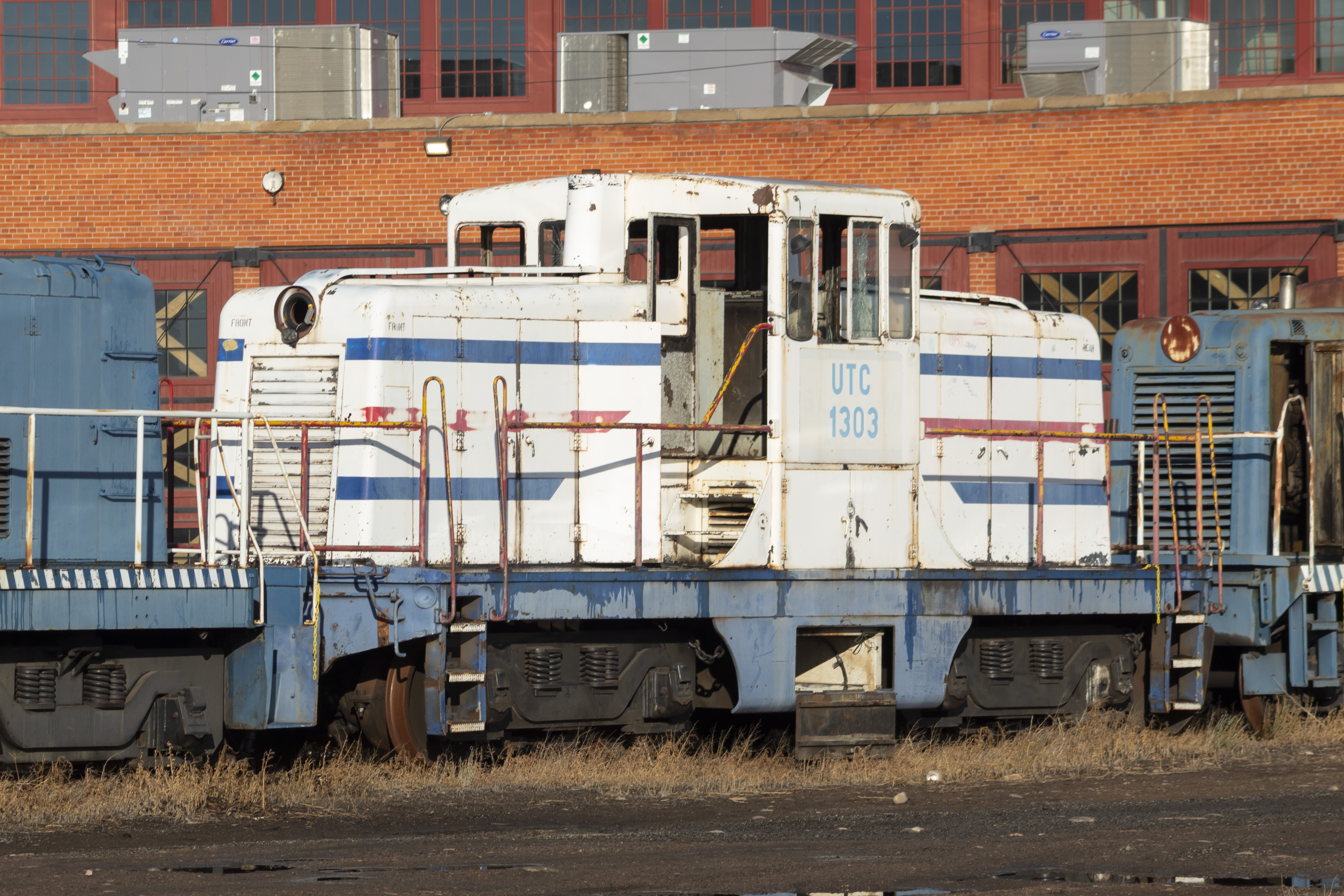
Union Tank Car 1303, formerly SLG&W DS.5; on display at the Evanston Roundhouse.

After the railroad's purchase by Patriot Rail, D.S. 11 was retired and two EMD GP9 locomotives, 8201 and 8223 were added to the roster.

== Surviving equipment ==
- MC-3 survives on the California Western Railroad as M300.
- DS-2, a GE 44-tonner, is on display at the Western Railway Museum in California.
- Two open-air excursion cars are owned by the Utah State Railroad Museum in Ogden, Utah.
- One SLGW open-air passenger car is on display at the Heber Valley Railroad.
- Boxcar 100, originally used to store animal hides, resides at the Heber Valley Railroad.
- The last SLGW caboose is now a coffee station located in Mount Pleasant Utah.

== See also ==
- Saltair, Utah
