= Philip Henry Barkdull =

American painter and educator

- Born: March 22, 1888; Hatton, Utah, U.S.
- Died: November 5, 1968 (aged 80); Logan, Utah, U.S.
- Resting place: Logan City Cemetery
- Education: Brigham Young High School; Brigham Young University; Art Institute of Chicago
- Occupations: Painter, educator
- Spouse: Evelyn Woodbury
- Children: 2 sons, 1 daughter

Philip Henry Barkdull (March 22, 1888 – November 5, 1968) was an American modernist painter and educator.

== Life ==
Barkdull was born on March 22, 1888, in Hatton, Utah. He attended Brigham Young High School, and Brigham Young University in 1928. He attended the Art Institute of Chicago, and he was trained by Birger Sandzén in 1927–1928.

Barkdull taught at Dixie College in St. George in 1917, and he later taught in public schools in Logan, Millard, and Provo. Barkdull was also a modernist painter. According to Utah Art, Utah Artists: 150 Year Survey, "His formal structure, fauvist colors, and thick impasto imbue his painting with textual richness. His distorted forms and lack of perspective put his oil works squarely with the modernists."

Barkdull was a member of the Church of Jesus Christ of Latter-day Saints, and he married Evelyn Woodbury in the St. George Utah Temple in 1919. They had two sons and a daughter. Barkdull died on November 5, 1968, in Logan, Utah, and he was buried in the Logan City Cemetery.
