= Corn Creek =

Corn Creek may refer to:

- Corn Creek (Millard County, Utah), a creek in Utah, United States
  - Corn Creek Indian Farm, a farm in Millard County, Utah
- Corn Creek, Nevada, United States, an unincorporated community
  - Corn Creek Campsite, a field station in the Desert National Wildlife Refuge
- Corn Creek, South Dakota, United States, an unincorporated community
- Corn Creek, Kentucky, the post office serving Wises Landing, Kentucky, and the creek for which it was named
