= Sutherland, Utah =

Sutherland
- CDP
- Location in Millard County and the state of Utah.
- Coordinates: 39°23′22″N 112°38′24″W
- Country: United States
- State: Utah
- County: Millard
- Founded: 1909
- Founder: Myron Abbott
- Named for: George Sutherland

Area
  - Total: 2.2 sq mi (5.7 km^{2})
  - Land: 2.2 sq mi (5.7 km^{2})
  - Water: 0.0 sq mi (0 km^{2})
- Elevation: 4,626 ft (1,410 m)

Population (2020)
  - Total: 147
  - Density: 67/sq mi (26/km^{2})
- Time zone: UTC-7 (Mountain (MST))
  - Summer (DST): UTC-6 (MDT)
- ZIP codes: 84624
- Area code: 435
- GNIS feature ID: 2584778

Sutherland is a census-designated place in northeastern Millard County, Utah, United States. The population was 147 at the 2020 census.

== Geography ==
Sutherland is located in the north central part of Millard County, some 4 miles (6.4 km) northwest of the city of Delta across the Sevier River. Hinckley lies about 6 miles (9.7 km) to the southwest, and Gunnison Bend Reservoir is 5 miles (8.0 km) south. Sutherland is one of a number of small farming communities in the area, including Woodrow and Sugarville just to the north. About 9 miles (14 km) to the west is the site of the historic Topaz War Relocation Center.

== History ==
In 1909, a tract of thousands of acres of land northwest of the new city of Delta became available for agricultural settlement, under the terms of the Carey Act. Settlers began to cluster around the property of Myron Abbott, regarded as founder of the community, which was known early on as North Tract or West Delta. By 1912, there were 80 families with 121 children of school age in the area. Tired of waiting for county officials, private citizens built a public schoolhouse in 1913. Then residents petitioned for the creation of a voting precinct and school district. The name Sutherland was chosen in honor of Utah political figure George Sutherland, who was serving as a United States senator at the time. The Sutherland elementary school remained open until the 1970s.

== Demographics ==
Historical population
Census	Pop.	Note	%±
1920	446		—
1930	438		−1.8%
1940	507		15.8%
1950	428		−15.6%
2010	165		—
2020	147		−10.9%
Source: U.S. Census Bureau

As of the census of 2010, there were 165 people living in the CDP. There were 53 housing units. The racial makeup was 95.8% White, 3.0% from some other race, and 1.2% from two or more races. Hispanic or Latino of any race were 6.1% of the population.

== Notable person ==
- Carlos E. Asay—Member of the First Quorum of the Seventy of the LDS Church, born in Sutherland

== See also ==
- List of census-designated places in Utah
