= Meadow Creek (Millard County) =

Creek in Millard County, Utah

Meadow Creek is a stream in Millard County, Utah. It was originally known as 4th Creek south of Sevier River to the early travelers on the Mormon Road. Its mouth is located at an elevation of 4,842 feet or 1,476 meters. Its source is located an elevation of 9,760 feet, at 38°51′50″N 112°14′16″W near the summit of White Pine Peak in the Pahvant Range. Meadow is located north of the mouth of the stream.

== See also ==
- List of rivers of Utah
