= Corn Creek (Millard County, Utah) =

Stream in Utah, United States

- Location within Utah

Physical characteristics
- Source
  - location: Confluence of East Fork Corn Creek and West Fork Corn Creek
  - coordinates: 38°45′40″N 112°15′05″W
  - elevation: 7,313 ft (2,229 m)
- Mouth
  - location: Kanosh
  - coordinates: 38°49′13.88″N 112°26′22.78″W
  - elevation: 4,918 ft (1,499 m)

Corn Creek, also called Kanosh Creek, is a stream in Millard County, Utah. Its mouth is located in the Pahvant Valley. Its source is at the confluence of East Fork Corn Creek and West Fork Corn Creek in the Pahvant Range.

== History ==
The location near the mouth of Corn Creek was originally a stopping place known as Willow Flats for the early travelers on the Mormon Road. On January 17, 1851, George A. Smith, leader of Mormon colonists who were on their way to establish the colony at Parowan, wrote about Willow Flat to Brigham Young, that the area was, "... a prospect for a colony not to be slighted... Corn Creek sinks and forms a large meadow. The grazing is extensive; the range very good... the soil had the appearance of being very good... it seemed to suit many farmers of our camp, who would have been perfectly satisfied to have remained at that point."

From 1851, Corn Creek was where Brigham Young, as territorial superintendent of Indian affairs for Utah, established an Indian farm for the Pahvant Indians, one of a three such farms in Utah Territory. Settlers from Fillmore grew potatoes, wheat, and corn to supplement the beans, corn, potatoes, pumpkins and squash that the Corn Creek band of Pahvants had grown at their village farther up the creek for years under their chief Kanosh. Here at Kanosh's request they were to be taught the Mormon's farming methods under the direction of a local Indian agent. The Corn Creek Indian Farm on Corn Creek existed there from 1855 to 1867, when most of its native inhabitants took down their farms and moved to the new Ute reservation, leaving the land for the new settlement of Kanosh.

In 1859, settlers from Fillmore, settled where the Mormon Road crossed the creek northwest of the Corn Creek village and farm. It was named for Peter Robison, its first post master, Petersburg (1859-1877). Petersburg was one of the larger stations and rest stops on the Gilmer and Salisbury Stage Company line from the Utah Central Railroad and Utah Southern Railroad rail head to the mining boom town of Pioche, Nevada from 1864 to 1871. From 1877 to 1940, an agricultural settlement there had a post office called Hatton. This settlement is now a ghost town, with little to see of its past existence among the irrigated fields.

== See also ==
- List of rivers of Utah
