= Flowell, Utah =

Unincorporated community in the state of Utah, United States

Flowell
- Unincorporated community
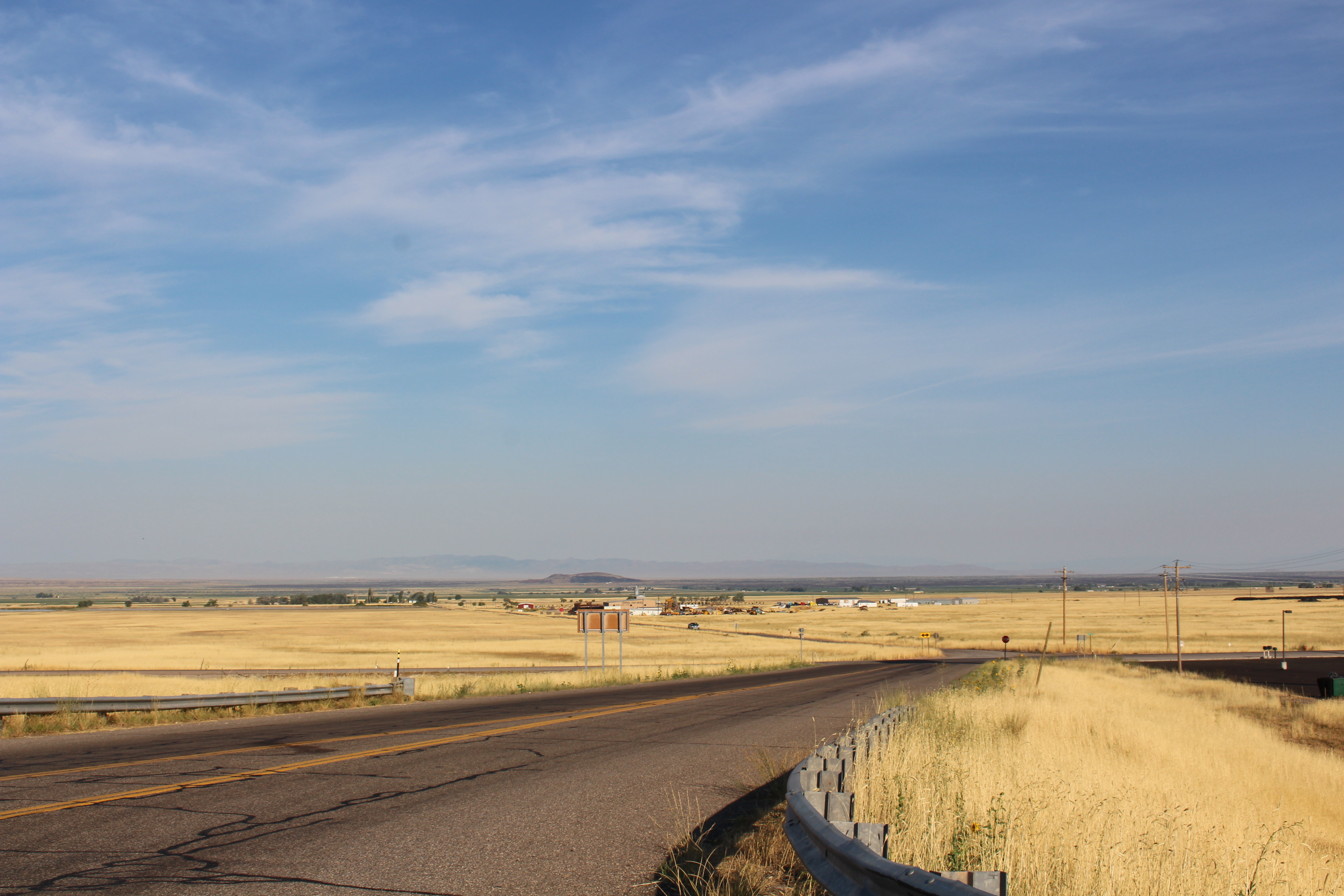
- Looking east towards Flowell

- Location within Utah Location within the United States
- Coordinates: 38°58′44″N 112°25′42″W
- Country: United States
- State: Utah
- County: Millard
- Settled: July 1915
- Founder: Brigham Tomkinson
- Named for: Flowing artesian wells
- Elevation: 4,708 ft (1,435 m)
- Time zone: UTC-7 (Mountain (MST))
  - Summer (DST): UTC-6 (MDT)
- ZIP code: 84631
- Area code: 435
- GNIS feature ID: 1454595

Flowell is an unincorporated community in Millard County, Utah, United States.

== Geography ==
Flowell is a small farming village in the Pavant Valley, approximately 6 miles (9.7 km) west of Fillmore, the county seat. The town of Meadow is about 8 miles (13 km) to the south, across I-15. Utah State Route 100 connects Flowell with Fillmore to the east, and with U.S. Route 50 to the north. Just west of Flowell is the Ice Springs lava flow, part of the Black Rock Desert volcanic field, and a location that had an eruption less than 1,000 years ago.

== History ==
Historical population
Census	Pop.	Note	%±
1930	185		—
1940	206		11.4%
1950	237		15.0%
Source: U.S. Census Bureau

In July 1915, Brigham Tomkinson drilled the first successful artesian well west of Fillmore, turning worthless desert into rich farmland and setting off a wave of well drilling in eastern Millard County. The center of this activity was first named Crystal, then Flowell after the freely-flowing wells. A school was built in 1919, and a post office in 1922. In the 1930s, Flowell built a community recreation hall with federal assistance from the Works Progress Administration.
