= Utah State Route 99 =

State highway in Utah, United States

State Route 99
- I-15 Business Loop, Fillmore
- SR-99 highlighted in red

Route information
- Maintained by UDOT
- Length: 4.193 mi (6.748 km)
- Existed: 1969–present

Major junctions
- South end: I-15 near Fillmore
- SR-100 in Fillmore
- North end: I-15 in Fillmore

Location
- Country: United States
- State: Utah

Highway system
- Interstate Highway System; Main; Auxiliary; Suffixed; Business; Future; Utah State Highway System; Interstate; US; State; Minor; Scenic
| ← SR-97 | → SR-100 |

State Route 99 (SR-99) is a state highway in the US state of Utah providing a business loop around I-15 for the town of Fillmore in the central portion of the state. The route is the main street for the town and spans 4.19 miles (6.74 km). The highway was established in 1969 as I-15 was constructed through the area, replacing US-91.

== Route description ==
The highway begins at a diamond interchange on I-15 at exit 163 heading southeast. Immediately past the interchange, the road turns northeast outside of Fillmore. Approaching the south city limits, the route turns east and becomes 500 South. In the south-central part of town, the road turns north onto Main Street and widens to four lanes at this point. Before intersecting at SR-100, the road loses two lanes at 300 North. The highway passes Paradise Resort Golf Course before turning northwest and terminating at another diamond interchange at I-15, exit 167.

== Photo Gallery ==
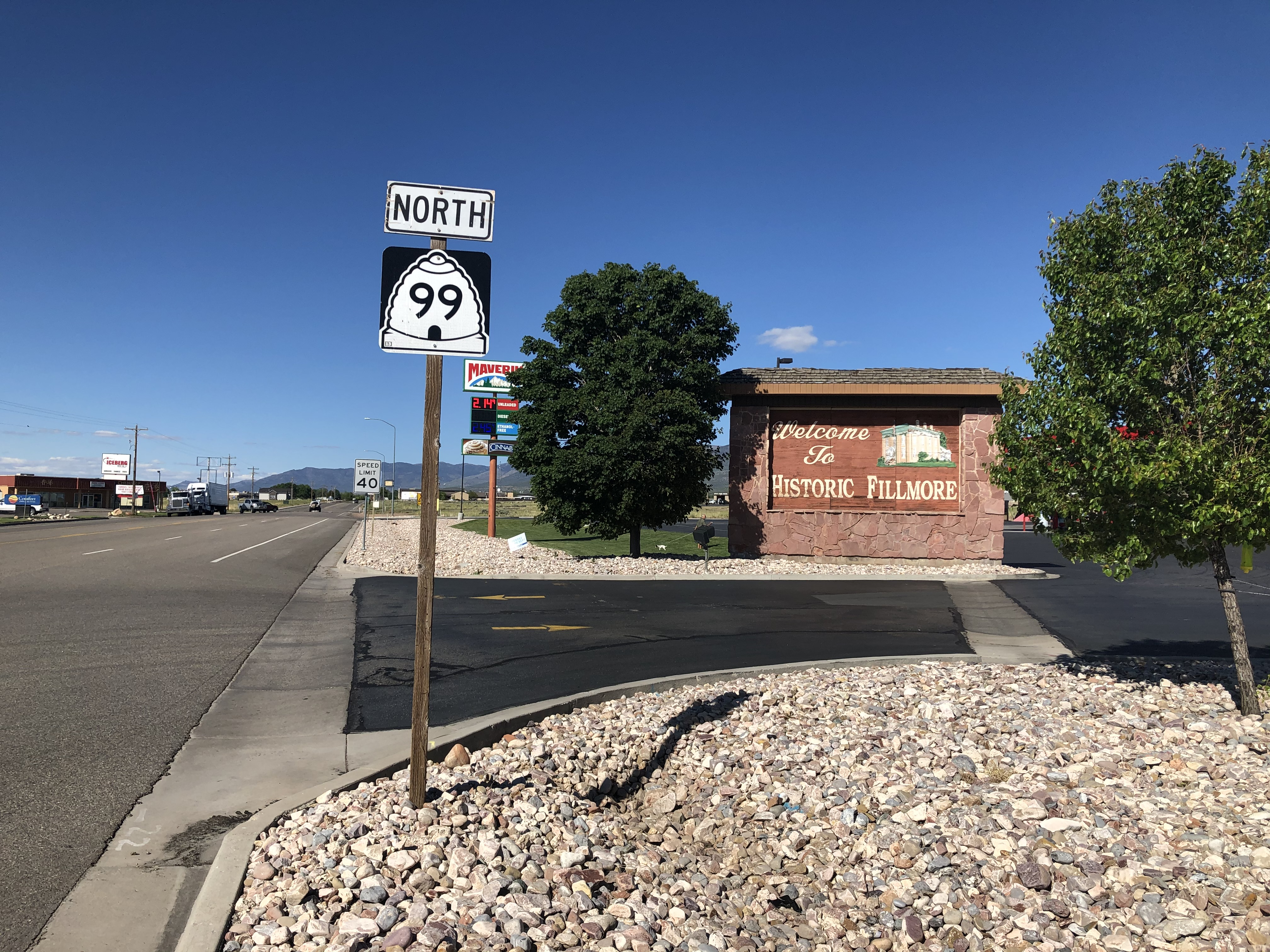
First northbound trailblazer on SR-99 at the south end of Fillmore (May 2020)

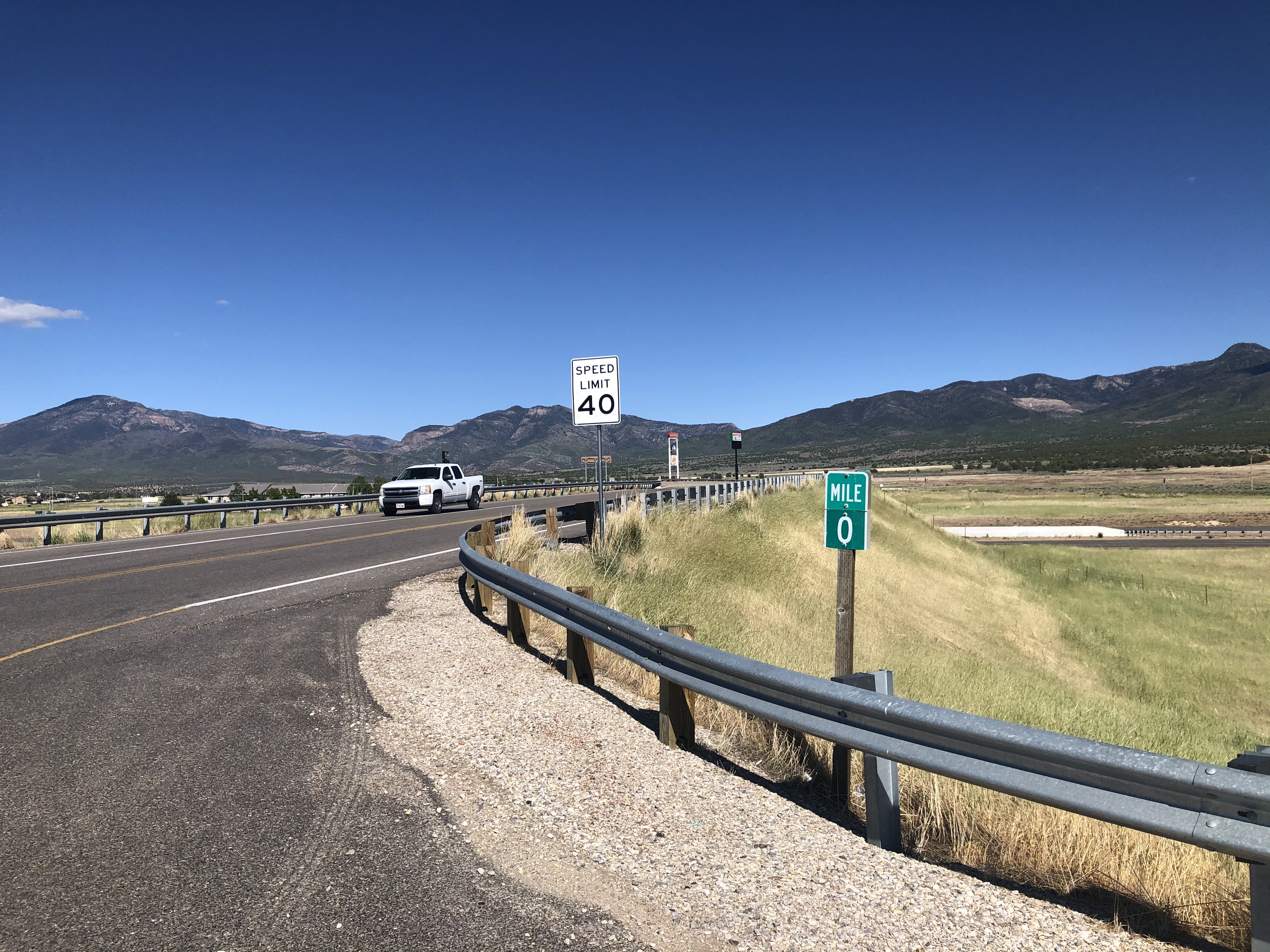
The southern end of SR-99 at I-15 exit 163 (May 2020)

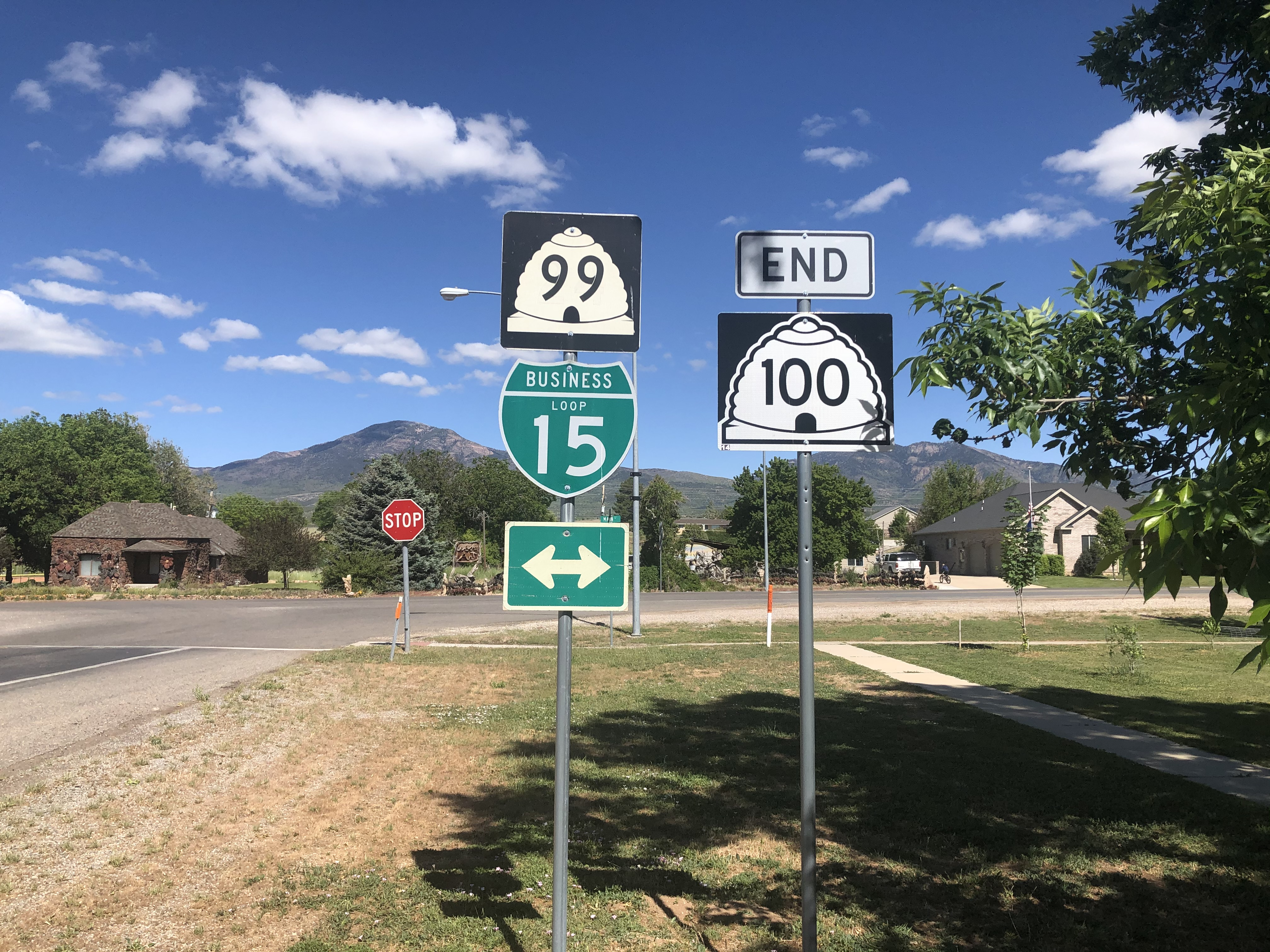
One of Utah's intersections of consecutively-numbered routes (May 2020)

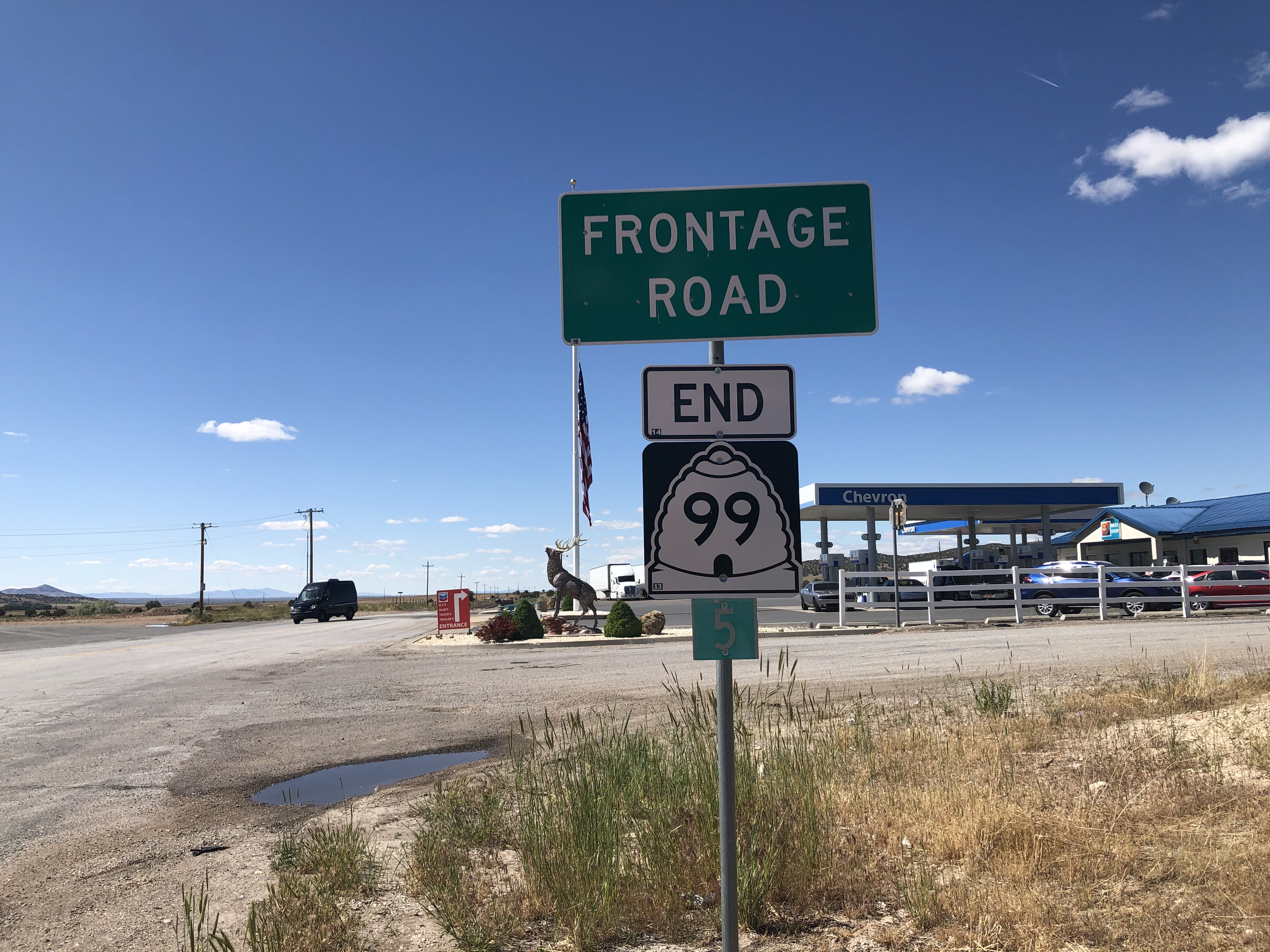
The north end of Route 99 (May 2020)

== History ==
State Route 99 was established in 1969 coinciding with the construction of I-15 in Millard County, providing a connection from two exits north and south of Fillmore. US-91 was routed along this road but as I-15 was replacing US-91, the state assumed maintenance of the road. Previously, State Route 99 was assigned to a road also in Millard County that linked the Topaz War Relocation Center used in World War II.

== Major intersections ==
The entire route is in Fillmore, Millard County.

| mi | km | Destinations | Notes |
|---|---|---|---|
| 0.000– 0.193 | 0.000– 0.311 | I-15 – Beaver | Southern terminus, also Exit 163 on I-15 |
| 3.094 | 4.979 | SR-100 west (400 North) | This is one of about a dozen places in Utah where two consecutively numbered routes meet. |
| 3.979– 4.193 | 6.404– 6.748 | I-15 – Salt Lake City | Northern terminus, also Exit 167 on I-15 |
1.000 mi = 1.609 km; 1.000 km = 0.621 mi
