= Meadow Hot Springs =

Thermal spring

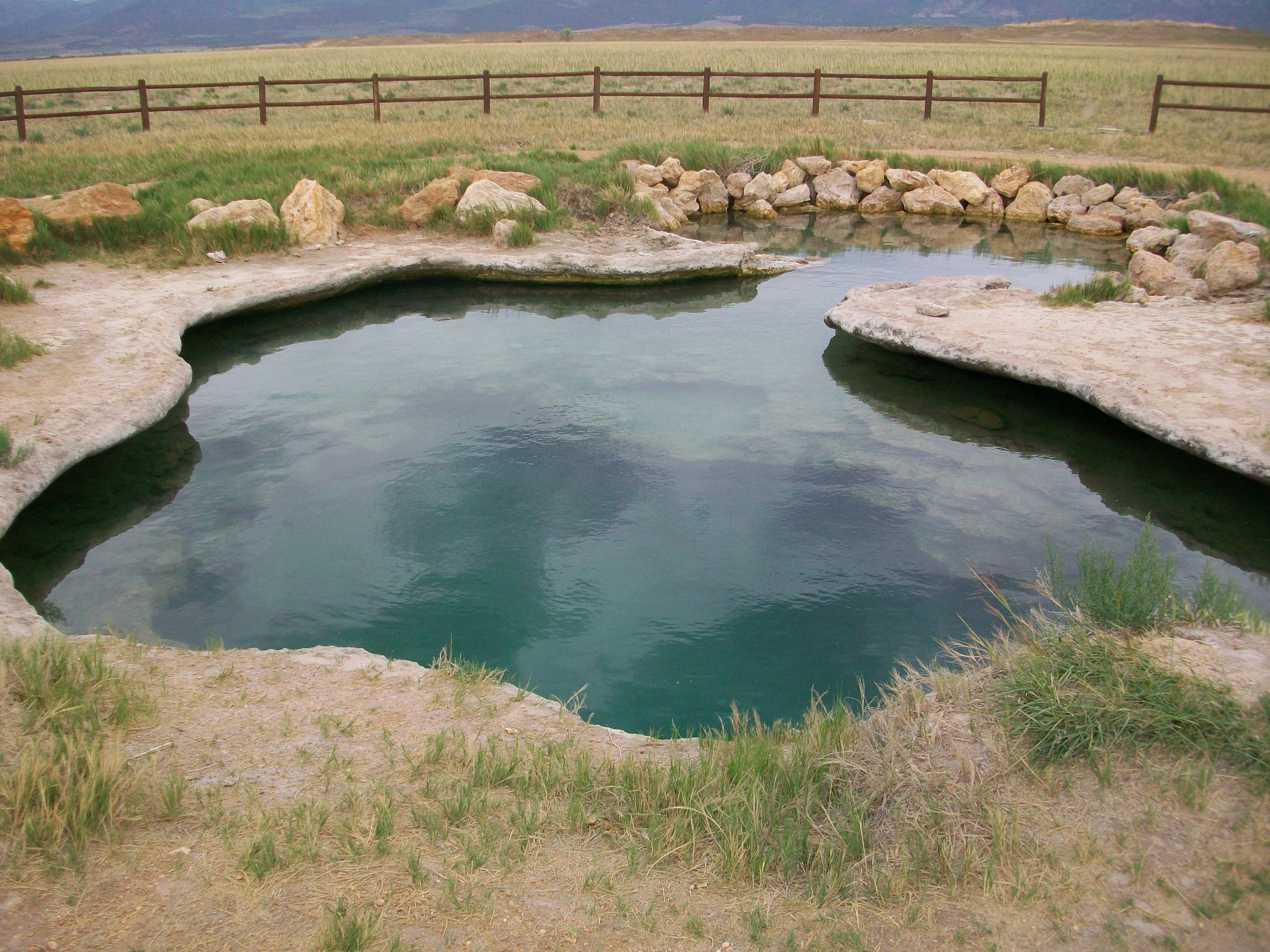
- Interactive map of Meadow Hot Springs
- Location: near Meadow, Utah
- Coordinates: 38°51′53″N 112°30′12″W
- Elevation: 5,200 ft (1,600 m)
- Type: geothermal
- Temperature: 106 °F (41 °C)

Meadow Hot Springs are a system of geothermal springs South of Fillmore, Utah, near the town of Meadow.

== Description ==
Three large soaking pools with ledges for sitting have been formed by travertine deposits. The travertine pools are more than 20 feet deep.

In 2019 a Utah man drowned in one of the hot springs after fully submerging himself under the water. His body was found underneath a rock ledge in the spring. He had sustained head injuries. His was one of four such drownings at the springs in 10 years.

== Water profile ==
The hot mineral water emerges from an underwater cave in the travertine formation at a temperature of 106 °F / 41 °C. The water is very clear, and blue in color.

== See also ==
- List of hot springs in the United States
- List of hot springs in the world
