= USS LST-987 =

LST-542-class tank landing ship

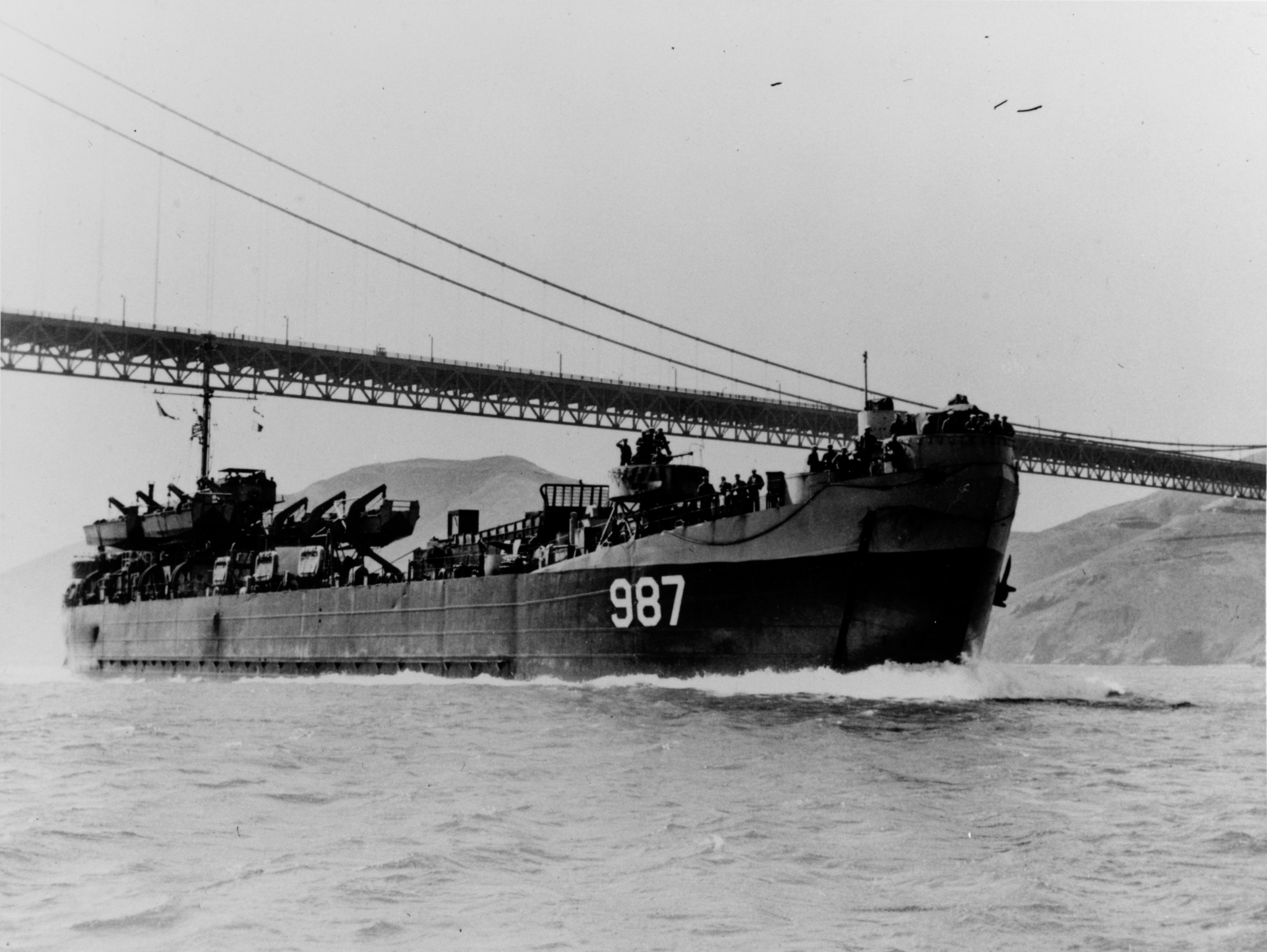
- USS Millard County (LST-987)

History

United States
- Name: USS LST-987
- Builder: Boston Navy Yard
- Laid down: 2 February 1944
- Launched: 5 March 1944
- Commissioned: 19 April 1944
- Decommissioned: 3 September 1946
- Renamed: USS Millard County (LST-987), 1 July 1955
- Stricken: 1 June 1960
- Fate: Sold into commercial service, August 1961, Scrapped in 2022
- Name: Columbia
- Identification: IMO number: 7428263; MMSI number: 366880220; Callsign: WTM3497
- Fate: Scrapped 2022
- Notes: Converted to hopper dredge in 1970s

General characteristics
- Class & type: LST-542-class tank landing ship
- Displacement: 1,625 long tons (1,651 t) light; 3,640 long tons (3,698 t) full
- Length: 328 ft (100 m)
- Beam: 50 ft (15 m)
- Draft: Unloaded : 2 ft 4 in (0.71 m) forward; 7 ft 6 in (2.29 m) aft; Loaded : 8 ft 2 in (2.49 m) forward; 14 ft 1 in (4.29 m) aft
- Propulsion: 2 × General Motors 12-567 diesel engines, two shafts, twin rudders
- Speed: 12 knots (22 km/h; 14 mph)
- Boats & landing craft carried: 2 × LCVPs
- Troops: Approximately 130 officers and enlisted men
- Complement: 8-10 officers, 89-100 enlisted men
- Armament: 8 × 40 mm guns; 12 × 20 mm guns

USS Millard County (LST-987) was an LST-542-class tank landing ship built for the United States Navy during World War II. Named after Millard County, Utah, it was the only U.S. Naval vessel to bear the name.

Originally laid down as LST-987 on 2 February 1944 at the Boston Navy Yard; launched on 5 March 1944; and commissioned on 19 April 1944.

== Service history ==
=== World War II, 1944-1945 ===
After shakedown along the east coast, LST-987 began duty under Commander, Amphibious Training Command, Atlantic Fleet. Assigned to LST Group 25, she operated out of Little Creek, Virginia during the next year as an underway training ship in Chesapeake Bay. She trained LST officers and crews in procedures of beaching, gunnery, ship handling, and tactics. In addition, she trained with Army tanks and equipment and carried out pontoon beaching exercises. During this period, she completed three cruises for officers and 23 cruises for crews.

On 19 April 1945, LST-987 entered Portsmouth Navy Yard for a two-week overhaul; thence, after loading rolling stock and LCT-523, she sailed on 16 May for the Pacific. Arriving Pearl Harbor on 13 June, she unloaded equipment and embarked soldiers of the 545th Field Artillery. The LST then sailed for the western Pacific on 21 June. Steaming via the Marshalls and Marianas, she reached Leyte Gulf, Philippines on 15 July, debarked troops, and on the 16th reported for duty with ServRon 10. Between 26 and 29 July, LST-987 steamed into Subic Bay, Luzon. There she embarked units of the 479th Air Service Squadron with rolling stock and cargo, and on 1 August she sailed for Okinawa. She reached Hagushi on 6 August and, after discharging men and equipment at Ie Shima from 12 to 16 August, she sailed for the Philippines the 21st. Steaming via Subic Bay, she reached Leyte Gulf on 30 August.

=== Post-war activities, 1945-1949 ===
Assigned to occupation operations, LST-987 steamed to Panay, Philippines on 6 September where she embarked troops of the 40th Infantry. Between 17 and 27 September, she steamed to Inchon where she off-loaded equipment, thence she sailed to Pusan on 2 to 4 October and debarked troops. She returned to Inchon on 8 October, embarked 1,000 Japanese POWs, and sailed for Japan on 11 October. Arriving on 14 October, she debarked the Japanese, and three days later, got underway for the Philippines. She lost her port propeller on 18 October, but with assistance from LST-841, reached Subic on 23 October. LST-987 continued to support the lifting of occupation forces in the Far East during the remainder of the year and runs carried her from the Sea of Japan to the East China Sea. Early in 1946, she returned to the United States from the western Pacific, and in May she was assigned duty as a Naval Reserve training ship. She decommissioned on 3 September 1946, but continued service training Naval Reserves; and for over three years operated under command of the Potomac Naval River Command.

=== Decommissioning ===
LST-987 entered the Atlantic Reserve Fleet at Green Cove Springs, Florida in May 1950. Named USS Millard County (LST-987) on 1 July 1955, she remained in her Florida berthing area until mid-1960. Her name was struck from the Naval Vessel Register on 1 June 1960.

== In commercial service ==
In August 1961, she was sold to the German Navy for conversion into a battle damage repair ship (ARB). However, this conversion was never undertaken and she never saw commissioned service in the Bundesmarine. Struck from the German Naval List in early 1968, she was sold for scrap in November of that year.

Sold again in 1972 to Zandzuig & Transportbedrijf H.G. & G.D. Blomberg B. V. of Berkel en Rodenrijs, The Netherlands, flagged Panamanian. On 22 September 1972, she was docked on the railway at "de Merwede" shipyard in The Netherlands and conversion to trailing suction hopper dredge commenced. She was renamed Esperance III and subsequently dredged gravel in the North Sea. Resold in 1978 to Cdeco Maritime Construction Inc. of Wilmington, Delaware, she was reflagged U.S. Sold again in 1980 to American International Dredge Corporation. The vessel was resold in 1986 to B & B Dredging Corporation of Crystal River, Florida and renamed Columbus. She was sold again in 1996 to Proteus Co., Chicago, Illinois and was operated by B+B Dredging Company of Chicago, Illinois. She primarily performed maintenance dredging of federal navigation channels for the United States Army Corps of Engineers. Renamed Columbia in 2002. Sold to The Dutra Group of San Rafael, California in December 2009. She was listed as scrapped as of 2022.
