= Abraham, Utah =

American unincorporated community

Coordinates: 39°23′48″N 112°43′05″W

Abraham is an unincorporated community in Millard County, in the U.S. state of Utah.

== History ==
The first settlement at Abraham was made in 1890. A post office called Abraham was established in 1899, and remained in operation until 1954. The community was named after Abraham H. Cannon, a Mormon leader.
