= Carlos E. Asay =

American Mormon leader (1926–1999)

First Quorum of the Seventy
- April 3, 1976 – October 5, 1996
- Called by: Spencer W. Kimball
- End reason: Granted general authority emeritus status

Presidency of the First Quorum of the Seventy
- February 22, 1980 – August 15, 1986
- Called by: Spencer W. Kimball
- End reason: Honorably released

Presidency of the Seventy
- October 1, 1989 – August 15, 1996
- Called by: Ezra Taft Benson
- End reason: Honorably released

Emeritus General Authority
- October 5, 1996 – April 10, 1999
- Called by: Gordon B. Hinckley

Personal details
- Born: Carlos Egan Asay; June 12, 1926; Sutherland, Utah, United States
- Died: April 10, 1999 (aged 72); Salt Lake City, Utah, United States
- Resting place: Monroe City Cemetery; 38.6428°N 112.1114°W
- Spouse(s): Colleen Webb
- Children: 7
- Parents: Aaron Elias Asay; Elsie Egan

Carlos Egan Asay (June 12, 1926 – April 10, 1999) was a general authority of the Church of Jesus Christ of Latter-day Saints (LDS Church) from 1976 until his death.

== Early life ==
Asay was born in Sutherland, Utah, and raised in Monroe, Utah. In 1947, just prior to leaving on his mission, Asay married Colleen Webb.

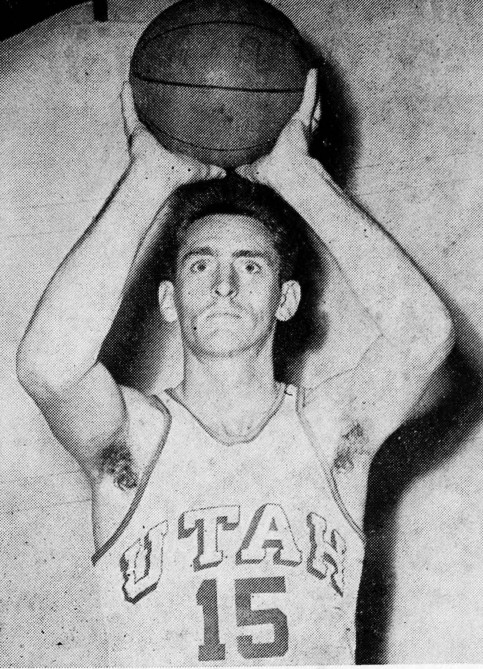
Asay as a member of the University of Utah men's basketball team, circa 1953.

From 1947 to 1950, he served as an LDS Church missionary in Palestine, Syria and Lebanon. When he first arrived in the mission, Asay had a hard time finding his mission president, Badwagan Piranian, who was also arriving from Switzerland. Asay and his mission companion eventually managed to locate Piranian and his wife in Beirut, Lebanon. Asay gained publicity for the church by joining the Lebanese national basketball team.

Asay had a bachelor's degree from the University of Utah, a master's degree from California State University, Long Beach and a doctorate from the University of Utah. Asay was a member of the University of Utah basketball team that won the NIT championship in 1947.

== LDS Church service ==
Asay served in a variety of callings in the LDS Church, including bishop, regional representative, and member of the general board of the Sunday School. He was president of the church's Texas North Mission from 1970 to 1973 and later was the president of the church's International Mission.

In 1976, Asay became a general authority and a member of the First Quorum of the Seventy; his first assignment was to head the church's missionary department. Allegations of sexual abuse by a Missionary Training Center president during his tenure have been raised; however, there is no evidence that Asay was aware of these allegations.

He was a member of the seven-man Presidency of the Seventy twice, from 1980 to 1986 and from 1989 to 1996; in 1985–86 and 1995–96, he was the senior member of the presidency. In 1986, Asay served as the executive director of the church's curriculum department. In October 1996, Asay was designated as an emeritus general authority and appointed president of the Salt Lake Temple. He died of a heart attack while serving in that calling. His funeral was held in the Salt Lake Assembly Hall on Temple Square in Salt Lake City, Utah.

== Selected speeches ==
- "A Cloud of Witnesses" – October 10, 1993
- "A Joyous Obligation" – March 8, 1992
- "Heavenly Powers" – January 29, 1984
- "For a Saint to Live Right" – March 6, 1983
- "Flaxen Threads" – October 10, 1982
- "Would You Sell the Book of Mormon?" – February 1, 1981
- "Memory" – November 4, 1979
- "Spiritual Checkups" – July 13, 1976
- "It Might Have Been" – February 3, 1976

== See also ==
- Gerry Avant, "Elder Asay eulogized for lifetime of service", Church News, 1999-04-17
- "Elder Carlos E. Asay of the First Quorum of the Seventy," Ensign, May 1976, p. 134
