= Utah State Route 100 =

State highway in Utah, United States

State Route 100

Route information
- Maintained by UDOT
- Length: 16.934 mi (27.253 km)
- Existed: 1935–present

Major junctions
- South end: SR-99 in Fillmore
- North end: US 50 near Holden

Location
- Country: United States
- State: Utah

Highway system
- Utah State Highway System; Interstate; US; State; Minor; Scenic
← SR-99	→ SR-101

Utah State Route 100 (SR-100) is a state highway in the U.S. state of Utah. Located entirely in Millard County, it connects the city of Fillmore with Flowell and the ghost town of McCornick over a distance of 16.9 miles (27.2 km).

== Route description ==
The route begins as 400 North at SR-99 (Main Street) in Fillmore. From here, it travels west out of town, crosses over I-15. After 4.6 miles (7.4 km), the route turns north and continues through rural Millard County for about 12.3 miles (19.8 km) until it ends at US-50.

The course of this route trends generally from southeast to northwest. Although there is not an abundance of directional banner signage on the route, what few banners that exist indicate that SR-100 is an east-west route. Despite this, the route description and mileposts begin in Fillmore as they would if this were a north-south route.

== Photo Gallery ==
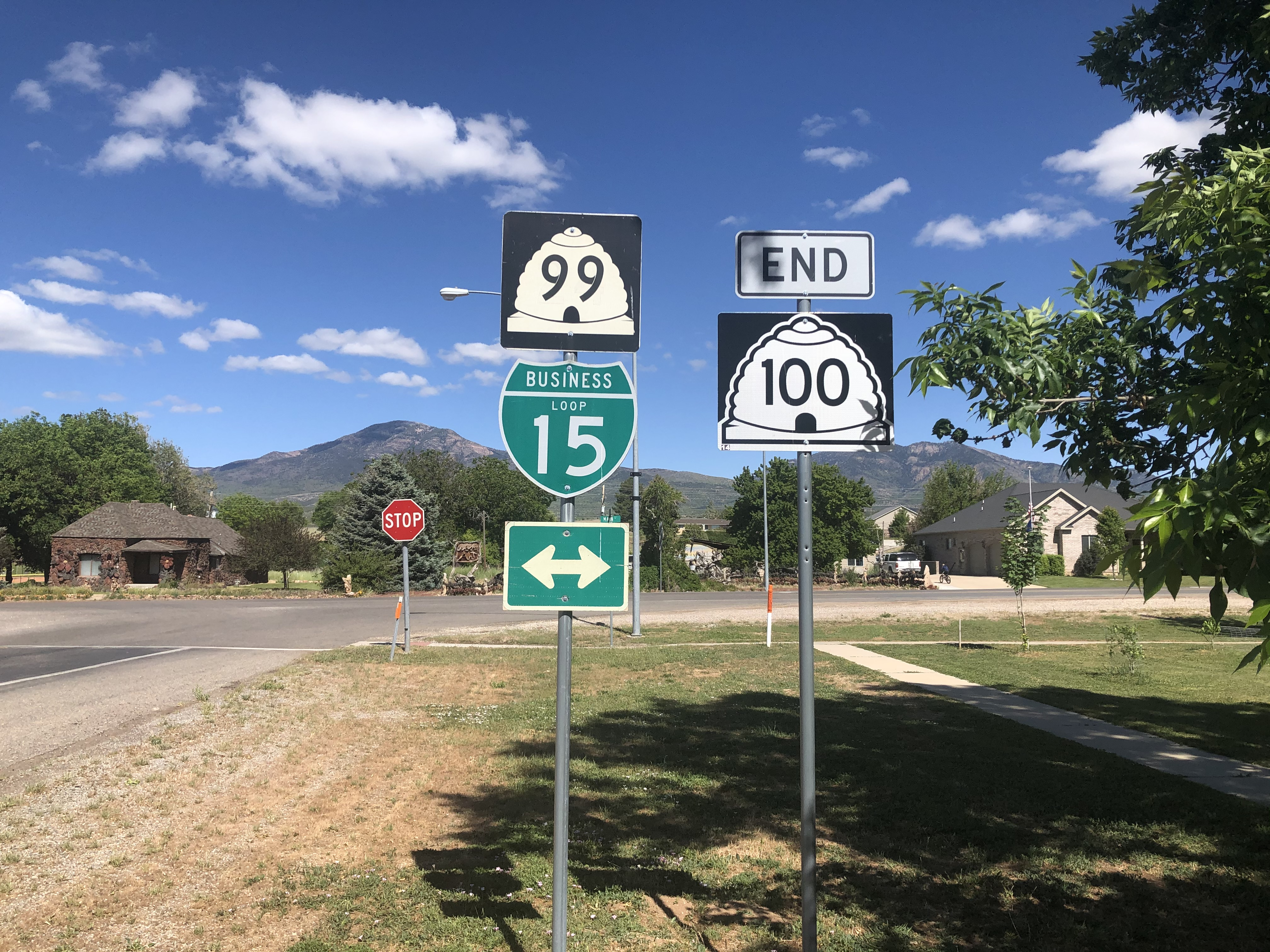
One of Utah's intersections of consecutively-numbered routes (May 2020)

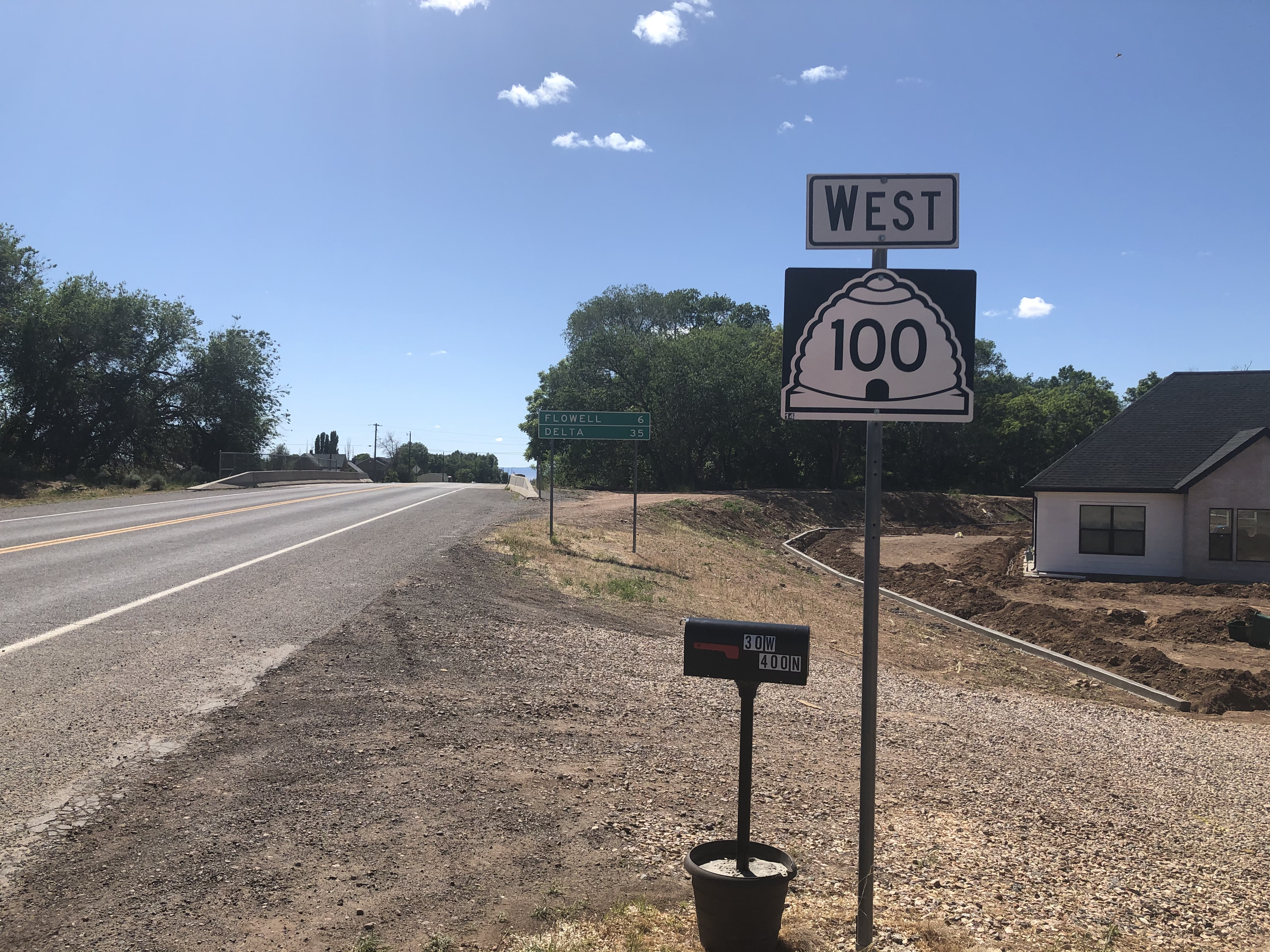
The eastern beginning of SR-100 at SR-99 in Fillmore (May 2020)

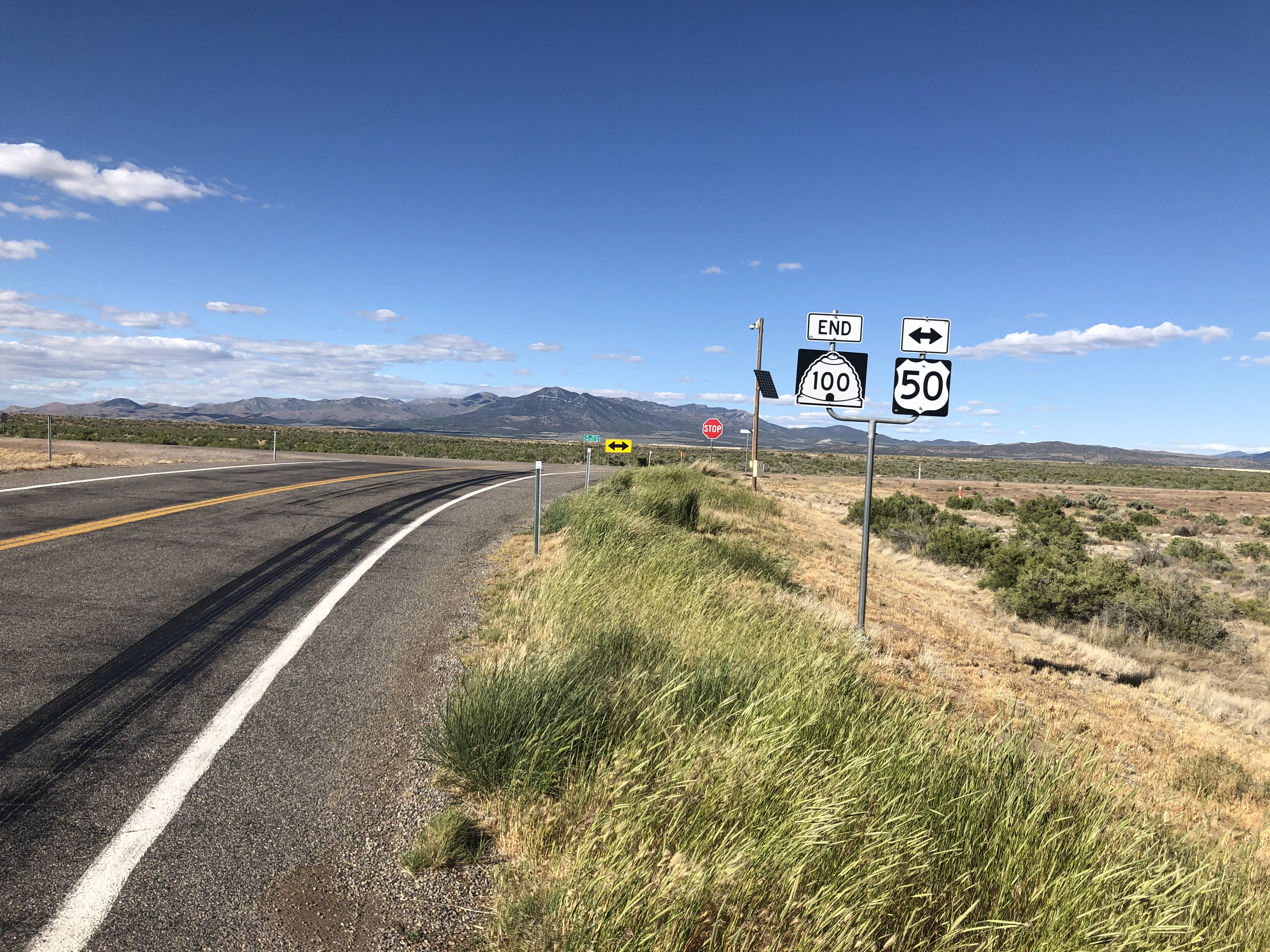
The western end of SR-100 (May 2020)

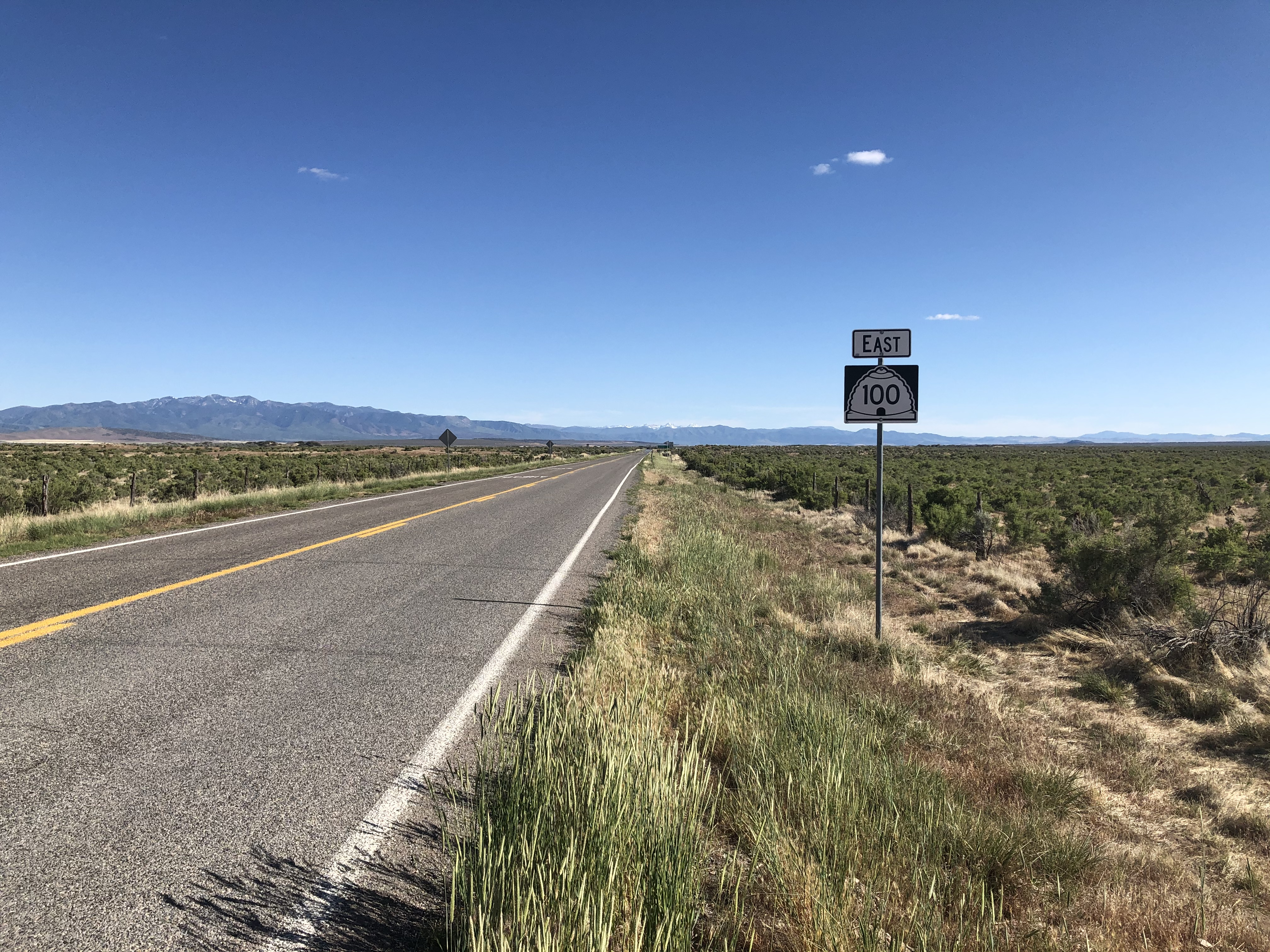
The western beginning of SR-100 (May 2020)

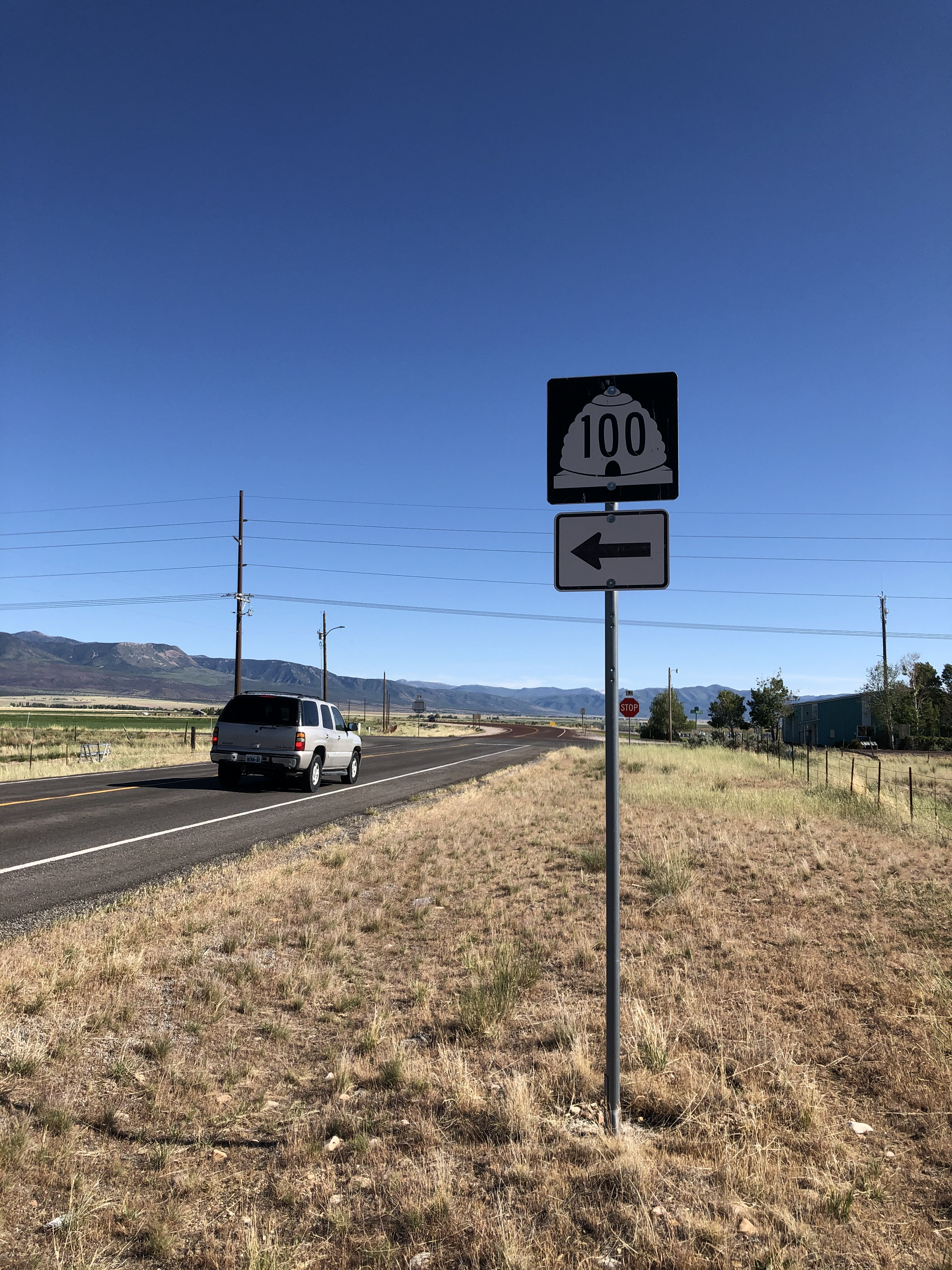
SR-100 right-angle turn near Flowell. The road turns from south to head east into Fillmore (May 2020)

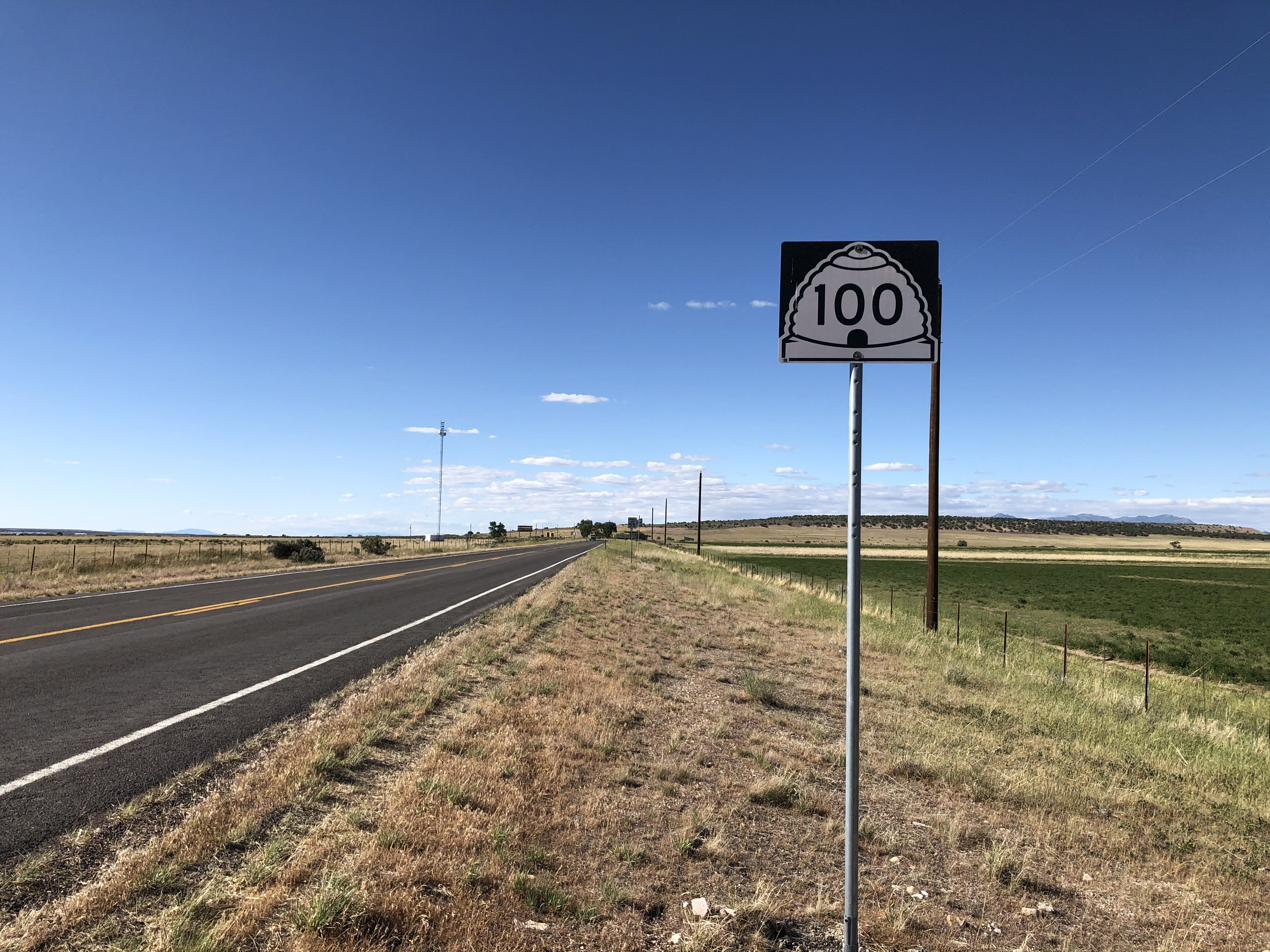
SR-100 midroute reassurance without directional banner, just beyond the 90° turn near Flowell. This one is facing northbound (westbound) traffic (May 2020)

== History ==
SR-100 was originally established in 1935 as connecting Fillmore at SR-1 (Main Street) and Flowell. The construction of I-15 through the area resulted in the old alignment of the route along 100 North to be severed in two by the interstate, so in 1965, the route was moved north three blocks to its current alignment along 400 North because of the proposed underpass on that street.

In 1969, the 12.6 miles (20.3 km) from near Flowell northward to US-50 was transferred to the route, resulting in its current length and alignment.

== Major intersections ==
The entire route is in Millard County.

Location	mi	km	Destinations	Notes
Fillmore	0.000	0.000	SR-99 (Main Street)	Southern terminus. This is one of about a dozen places in Utah where two consecutively numbered routes meet.
Fillmore	0.768– 0.817	1.236– 1.315	Bridge over I-15	No connection to freeway here
	16.934	27.253	US 50 – Holden, Delta	Northern terminus
1.000 mi = 1.609 km; 1.000 km = 0.621 mi
