= Hatton, Utah =

Settlement in Millard County, Utah, USA

Coordinates: 38°50′20″N 112°27′24″W

Hatton, formerly Petersburg, is an unincorporated community and near-ghost town in Millard County, Utah, United States. It lies at an elevation of 4,826 feet (1,471 meters).

== History ==
In 1859, Peter Robison and Peter Boyce from Fillmore and other settlers from nearby settled where the Mormon Road crossed Corn Creek, three miles northwest of Kanosh's Pahvant village on the creek and downstream from the Corn Creek Indian Farm. The settlement was sometimes called Lower Corn Creek but was named Petersburg for Peter Robison, later its first postmaster. Boyce succeeded Anson Call as Indian agent at Corn Creek, appointed by Brigham Young. Petersburg was one of the larger stations and rest stops on the Gilmer and Salisbury Stage Company line from the Utah Southern Railroad rail-head in Juab County to the mining boom town of Pioche, Nevada from 1864 to 1871. Between 1867 and 1869, most of its inhabitants moved upstream to build the town of Kanosh at the original Pahvant village site. In 1869, the Petersburg schoolhouse was moved and reconstructed at Kanosh. From 1877 to 1940, Petersburg, now a small agricultural settlement, was renamed and had a post office called Hatton.

== The Site today ==
This settlement is now almost a ghost town, with little to see of its past existence among the irrigated fields along Hatton Lane. There are however several occupied homes at the town site.

== See also ==
- List of ghost towns in Utah
