= Woodrow, Utah =

Unincorporated community in the state of Utah, United States

Coordinates: 39°25′58″N 112°38′00″W

Woodrow is an unincorporated community in Millard County, in the U.S. state of Utah.

== History ==
A post office called Woodrow was established in 1913, and remained in operation until 1915. The community was named after Woodrow Wilson, 28th President of the United States.
