= Sugarville, Utah =

Unincorporated community in the state of Utah, United States

- Unincorporated community
- Location within Utah Location within the United States
- Coordinates: 39°27′55″N 112°38′58″W
- Country: United States
- State: Utah
- County: Millard
- Elevation: 4,583 ft (1,397 m)
- Time zone: UTC-7 (Mountain (MST))
  - Summer (DST): UTC-6 (MDT)
- Area code: 435
- GNIS feature ID: 1437696

Sugarville is an unincorporated community in Millard County, Utah, United States. The community is 8.7 miles (14.0 km) north-northwest of Delta.
