= Corn Creek Indian Farm =

Farm in Millard County, Utah, US

Corn Creek Indian Farm was a farm established in 1855 for the Pahvant Utes on Corn Creek in Millard County, Utah. It was located just downstream from the Pahvant village of Kanosh. It was abandoned in 1867.

== History ==
The Pahvants were already farming at their village on Corn Creek before the Mormons began settling in the Pahvant Valley. As early as 1851 when Fillmore was established 12 miles north of his village, Kanosh expressed a desire to learn the Mormon's methods of farming.

Governor Brigham Young, as ex-official Superintendent of Indian Affairs for the Utah Territory, and Garland Hurt the federal Indian Agent for Utah, established three of these farms in Utah including the one at Corn Creek as early as 1854. The other two were at Sanpete and Spanish Fork. 30 tribesmen worked on them under the supervision of an American farmer, sometimes helped by Mormon neighbors to plow the fields, however despite all the work done they had little success due to the ravages of insects and the necessity for the farm workers to leave to hunt for food so they would not starve. In 1854, Kanosh had a letter written to Brigham Young asking for oxen, plows and other farm implements to be sent as had been promised the year before. The 1856 report to the Office of Indian Affairs from Governor Young reported that:

"Farming is being successfully conducted on three of the Indian reservations, made by agent Garland Hunt, viz.: on Corn creek in Millard county, on Twelve-mile creek, in San Pete county, and near the mouth of Spanish Fork, in Utah county, besides the work of government farmers, and the voluntary assistance of various individuals."

In 1856, the Corn Creek Farm was reported to have nineteen draft animals with accompanying harness and implements. In 1858, Superintendent of Indian Affairs, Jacob Forney reported on the state of the farm:

"A farm was commenced several years ago for a small tribe called the Pah-vants, on Corn creek, in Millard county, under the direction of Agent Hurt. Ranosh(Kanosh), the chief of this tribe, visited me, and expressed a desire that some good white man might be placed upon the farm to direct them, assuring me that the Indians would do all the work. His request was not as Indians' generally are, for paint, beads, &c, but for agricultural implements. I employed a Mr. Boyce to take charge of this farm, at fifty dollars a month. No other white labor will be employed. Eighty acres of wheat were raised upon this farm this year. I will visit in January and define a reservation."

In 1859 A. Humphries, Indian Agent for Utah reported that a grasshopper plague had destroyed the crops of the farm, and operations there were suspended there by order of the Superintendent.

Due to the removal of Superintendent Jacob Forney in 1859, that office of the Utah Indian Agency was left vacant for over a year and in debt. The farms fell into neglect. Humphries, put in charge provisionally, was forced to dispense with the Government farmers services, and sell off the stock and farming implements on the Indian Farms to help pay the debt and with what was left attempt to cloth and feed the impoverished Utah Indians dependent on the agency in the winter of 1861. Nevertheless, the Pahvants managed to grow crops with one team and a plow they had managed to retain.

In April 1866, the Pahvants began taking apart their village and farm at Corn Creek, burning their corrals and fences around their fields, in preparation for their move to the Uintah Basin Reservation, agreed to in the 1865 Spanish Fork Treaty with the Ute's. They lived at a temporary camp up stream but were dependent on the Indian Agency for food which was not forthcoming, so they looked for help from the local Mormons. To help themselves they moved to some land with springs 3 miles north of Corn Creek at 38°49′19″N 112°23′24″W, where they could farm to feed themselves with some help from the local Mormons. Between 1866 and 1870 most of the Pahvants moved to the Uintah Reservation, only about 100 remained at their new settlement at the springs. Kanosh and some of his people continued at Corn Creek until a grasshopper invasion in 1868 destroyed most of their crops. Kanosh and his people did not always remain in the Uintah Basin; they returned often to Corn Creek to farm, forage, and beg from Mormon settlers.
