= Kanosh, Utah =

Town in the state of Utah, United States

- Town
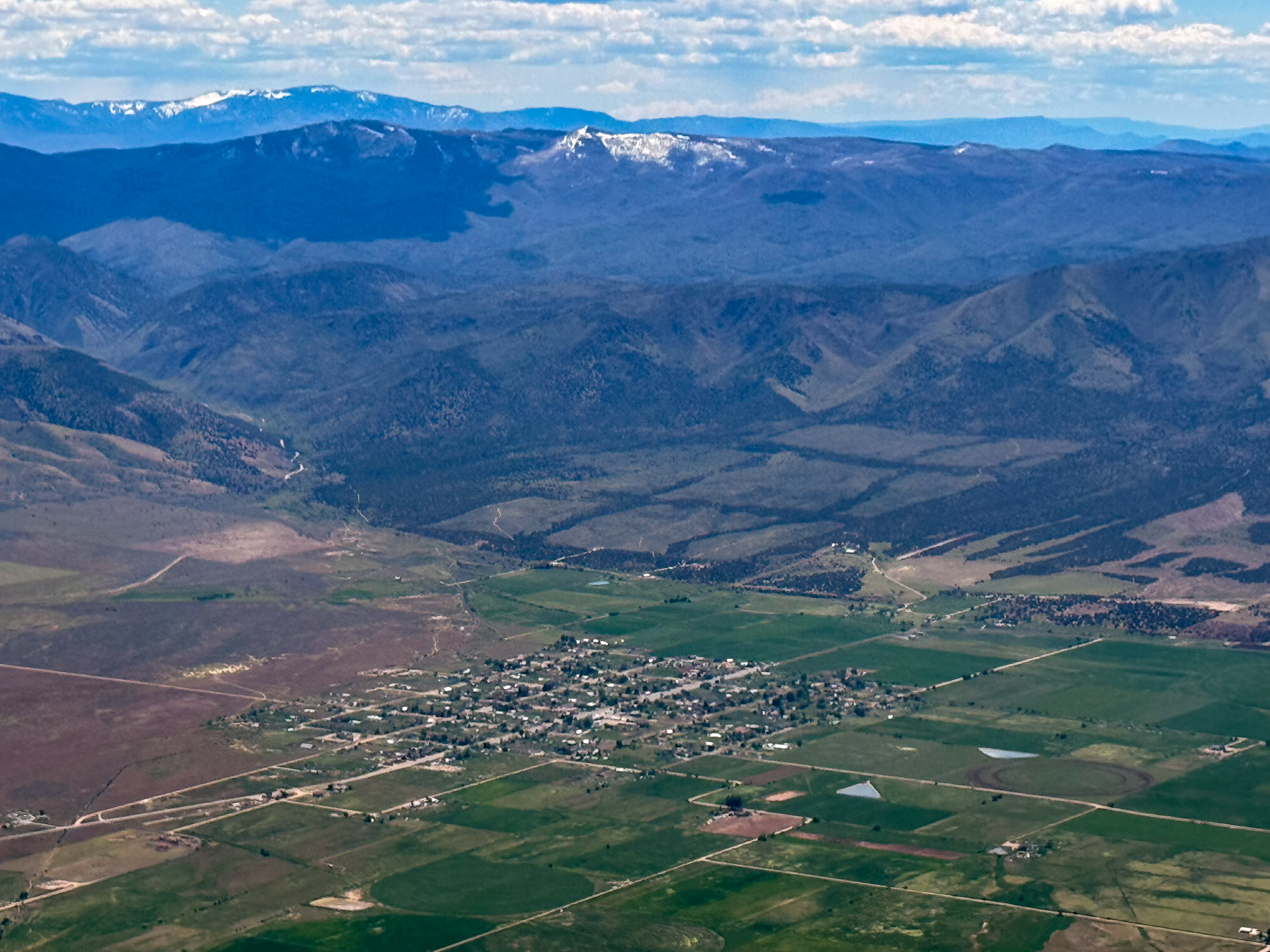
- Kanosh and mountains

- Location in Millard County and the state of Utah.
- Coordinates: 38°48′05″N 112°26′15″W
- Country: United States
- State: Utah
- County: Millard
- Settled: 1854
- Incorporated: 1901
- Named for: Chief Kanosh

Area
  - Total: 0.77 sq mi (2.00 km^{2})
  - Land: 0.77 sq mi (2.00 km^{2})
  - Water: 0 sq mi (0.00 km^{2})
- Elevation: 5,020 ft (1,530 m)

Population (2020)
  - Total: 508
  - Density: 628.5/sq mi (242.68/km^{2})
- Time zone: UTC-7 (Mountain (MST))
  - Summer (DST): UTC-6 (MDT)
- ZIP code: 84637
- Area code: 435
- FIPS code: 49-40250
- GNIS feature ID: 2412815
- Website: www.kanoshtown.com

Kanosh (/kəˈnɒʃ/ kə-NOSH) is a town in Millard County, Utah, United States. The population was 508 at the 2020 census.

== Geography ==
According to the United States Census Bureau, the town has a total area of 0.9 square miles (2.2 km^{2}), all land.

=== Climate ===
This climatic region is typified by large seasonal temperature differences, with warm to hot (and often humid) summers and cold (sometimes severely cold) winters.

Climate data for Kanosh, Utah (1991–2020)
Month	Jan	Feb	Mar	Apr	May	Jun	Jul	Aug	Sep	Oct	Nov	Dec	Year
Mean daily maximum °F (°C)	40.7 (4.8)	46.9 (8.3)	56.0 (13.3)	64.1 (17.8)	74.2 (23.4)	85.1 (29.5)	92.4 (33.6)	90.4 (32.4)	82.4 (28.0)	67.5 (19.7)	52.5 (11.4)	41.2 (5.1)	66.1 (18.9)
Daily mean °F (°C)	31.1 (−0.5)	36.1 (2.3)	44.5 (6.9)	50.5 (10.3)	60.2 (15.7)	71.1 (21.7)	78.8 (26.0)	77.0 (25.0)	68.0 (20.0)	54.5 (12.5)	41.0 (5.0)	31.0 (−0.6)	53.7 (12.0)
Mean daily minimum °F (°C)	21.6 (−5.8)	25.3 (−3.7)	33.0 (0.6)	36.8 (2.7)	46.2 (7.9)	57.2 (14.0)	65.3 (18.5)	63.6 (17.6)	53.5 (11.9)	41.5 (5.3)	29.5 (−1.4)	20.7 (−6.3)	41.2 (5.1)
Average precipitation inches (mm)	1.36 (35)	1.29 (33)	1.57 (40)	1.75 (44)	1.58 (40)	0.62 (16)	0.84 (21)	0.94 (24)	0.97 (25)	1.50 (38)	1.57 (40)	1.52 (39)	15.51 (395)
Average snowfall inches (cm)	15.5 (39)	12.8 (33)	11.5 (29)	7.6 (19)	0.2 (0.51)	0.0 (0.0)	0.0 (0.0)	0.0 (0.0)	0.0 (0.0)	3.2 (8.1)	9.6 (24)	19.3 (49)	79.7 (201.61)
Source: NOAA

== Demographics ==
Historical population
Census	Pop.	Note	%±
1890	536		—
1900	665		24.1%
1910	618		−7.1%
1920	573		−7.3%
1930	570		−0.5%
1940	526		−7.7%
1950	476		−9.5%
1960	499		4.8%
1970	319		−36.1%
1980	435		36.4%
1990	386		−11.3%
2000	485		25.6%
2010	474		−2.3%
2020	508		7.2%
U.S. Decennial Census

As of the census of 2000, there were 485 people, 165 households, and 130 families residing in the town. The population density was 569.8 people per square mile (220.3/km^{2}). There were 214 housing units at an average density of 251.4 per square mile (97.2/km^{2}). The racial makeup of the town was 95.88% White, 1.03% Native American, 2.68% from other races, and 0.41% from two or more races. Hispanic or Latino of any race were 3.71% of the population.

There were 165 households, of which 35.2% had children under the age of 18 living with them, 73.9% were married couples living together, 4.8% had a female householder with no husband present, and 21.2% were non-families. 20.6% of all households were made up of individuals, and 15.2% had someone living alone who was 65 years of age or older. The average household size was 2.94, and the average family size was 3.43.

In the town, the population was spread out, with 32.4% under the age of 18, 7.4% from 18 to 24, 17.1% from 25 to 44, 24.3% from 45 to 64, and 18.8% who were 65 years of age or older. The median age was 38 years. For every 100 females, there were 102.1 males. For every 100 females age 18 and over, there were 100.0 males.

The median income for a household in the town was $32,411, and the median income for a family was $36,583. Males had a median income of $30,556 versus $21,500 for females. The per capita income for the town was $11,346. About 9.6% of families and 17.2% of the population were below the poverty line, including 30.5% of those under age 18 and 3.3% of those age 65 or over.

== History ==
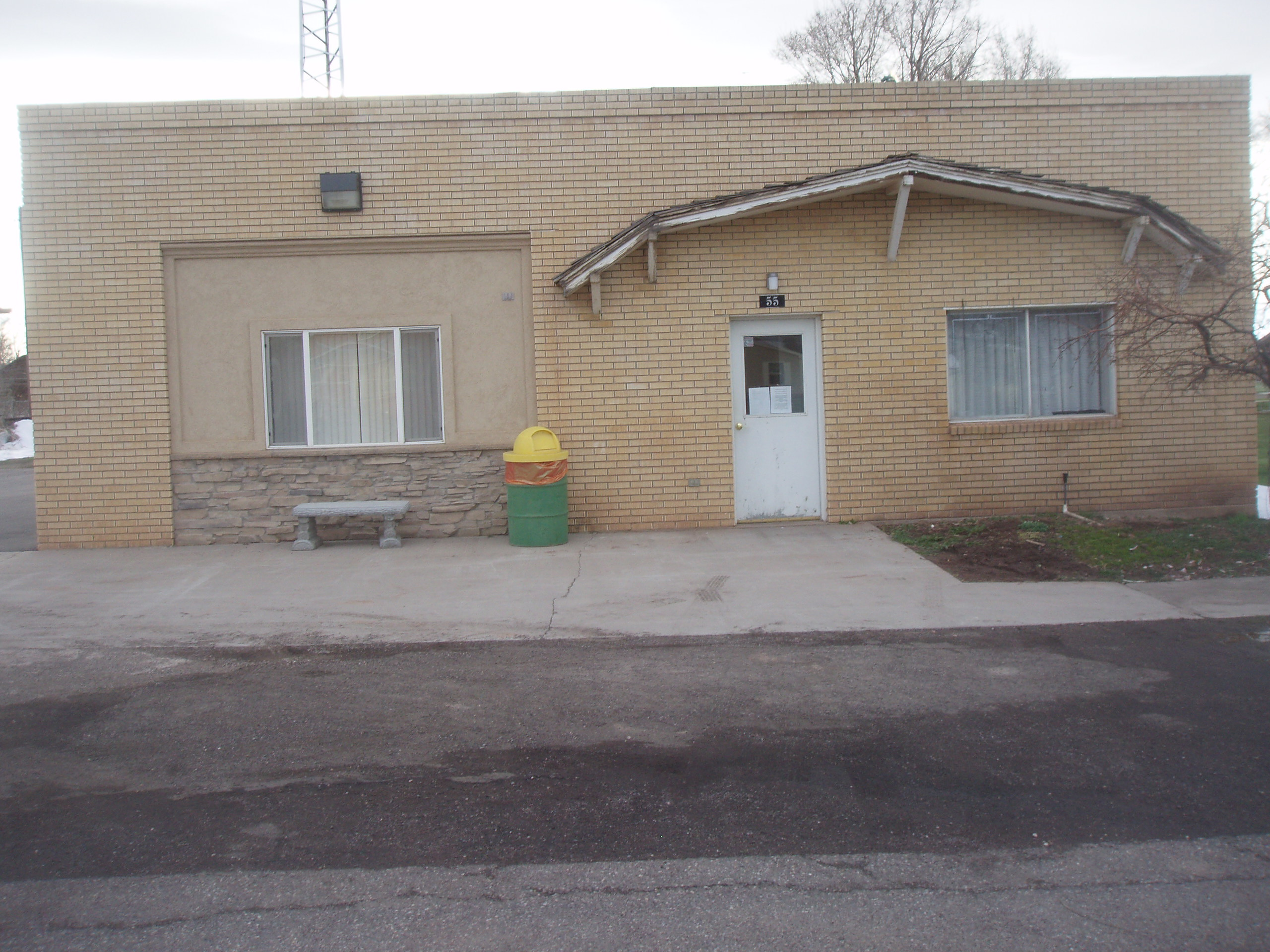
Kanosh town hall

Chief Kanosh began a small farm in this area before the arrival of the Mormons in Utah. His band of the Pahvants were based in this vicinity.

In 1859, Peter Robison and Peter Boyce began the aptly named settlement of Petersburg. This was not far from the current site of Kanosh.

The town of Kanosh dates back to April 28, 1867, when Brigham Young, with the approval of Chief Kanosh, advised the pioneers to move from Petersburg (later Hatton, Utah) to the area then known as the campground of the Pahvant band of the Ute Tribe. When this move took place (1867–68) there were approximately 100 pioneers and 500 Native Americans living here.

At that time the Chief Kanosh and many of his tribe were baptized members of the Church of Jesus Christ of Latter-day Saints. Mortimer Wilson Warner, a local pioneer, is credited with having suggested that the town be named Kanosh in honor of the wise tribal chief.

Chief Kanosh (1812?–1884), was the leader of the Pahvant Utes from the 1850s until the time of his death. According to Mormon records, he was the son of Kashe Bats and Wah Goots. The Pahvant band ranged the deserts surrounding Sevier Lake. With the intrusion of whites into this area, Kanosh struggled to insure the hegemony and survival of his people through negotiation rather than conflict.

Kanosh was settled by Mormon pioneers and Chief Kanosh himself became an early convert to the faith. It is thought that Kanosh's willingness to work with non-Utes came out of his experiences working in the Spanish missions in California. Whether that work was voluntary or part of the long-standing slave trade of Indians into the Spanish settlements is not known. Certainly, the physical characteristics of Kanosh and others of the "Bearded Utes", as Silvestre Vélez de Escalante had called the Pahvants in the 1770s, suggest generations of contact with the Spaniards. Kanosh spoke Spanish and seems to have had a facility for languages, as he also easily picked up English.

Over time, the Kanosh tribe dwindled both due to difficulty in adapting to a farming culture from a hunter-gathering culture and in intermarriage with the local settlers. Even though many of the natives were deeded farmland, most chose to abandon the lifestyle and accept a government offer to move into the Uinta reservation where they would receive economic assistance.

However, the Pahvants at Corn Creek, a settlement established near Kanosh, continued to farm. Surrounding Mormon settlers gave them some assistance. And although Kanosh was involved in the negotiations of the 1865 Spanish Fork treaty in which Utes agreed to move to the Uinta Basin, Kanosh and his group continued at Corn Creek until a grasshopper invasion in 1868 destroyed most of their crops. Even then, Kanosh and his people did not always remain in the Uinta Basin; they returned often to Corn Creek to farm, forage, and beg from Mormon settlers.

Though Chief Kanosh still has a headstone in an honored location of the city cemetery, it was not until 1929 that the U.S. Government granted official recognition of the tribe and deeded them a small reserve near their ancestral lands at Corn Creek. (The actual location of Kanosh's remains is still unknown but is rumored to be in the foothills surrounding Kanosh.) Those few tribal members that remain today have now been almost fully assimilated into the local culture shaped by agriculture, ranching and the Mormon faith. The Kanosh surname is quite common in the area, including among female descendants who retain it as a middle name. Some of Kanosh's descendants have earned university degrees and returned from successful careers elsewhere to contribute to a comeback in the local economy.

The town of Kanosh was organized as a ward of the Fillmore Stake in 1877.

The population of the Kanosh precinct was 565 in 1930.

Kanosh was adversely affected by atomic testing in the Nevada desert in the late 1950s and early 1960s, with many residents and former residents developing cancerous symptoms years later. In response and after years of effort by Utah's congressional delegation, the U.S. Congress passed amendments to the Radiation Exposure Compensation Act in 2000 to provide minimal compensation for those thus affected.

The government has taken positive steps to clean up the area so that many former residents have begun to return, adding or refurbishing businesses such as a motel, service station and eating places which were once closed or barely surviving. New homes have been or are being constructed on the north side of town. The south side of town has a stone "Welcome to Kanosh" monument at the junction of the new state highway which connects to I-15 southbound and the old highway which leads to the town cemetery. Thus, the once new interstate which once hastened the town's exodus has breathed new life into the town since the new state road connects to either the northbound or southbound I-15 interchanges within a few miles in either direction and also greatly reduces the driving time to Fillmore, Utah, county seat and one-time territorial capitol.

On the evening of July 25, 2021, a sandstorm led to a series of crashes near here on Interstate 15 involving 20 vehicles, that killed 8 people, including four children, and injured at least ten others, three critically.

== See also ==
- List of ghost towns in Utah
