= Meadow, Utah =

Town in the state of Utah, United States

- Town
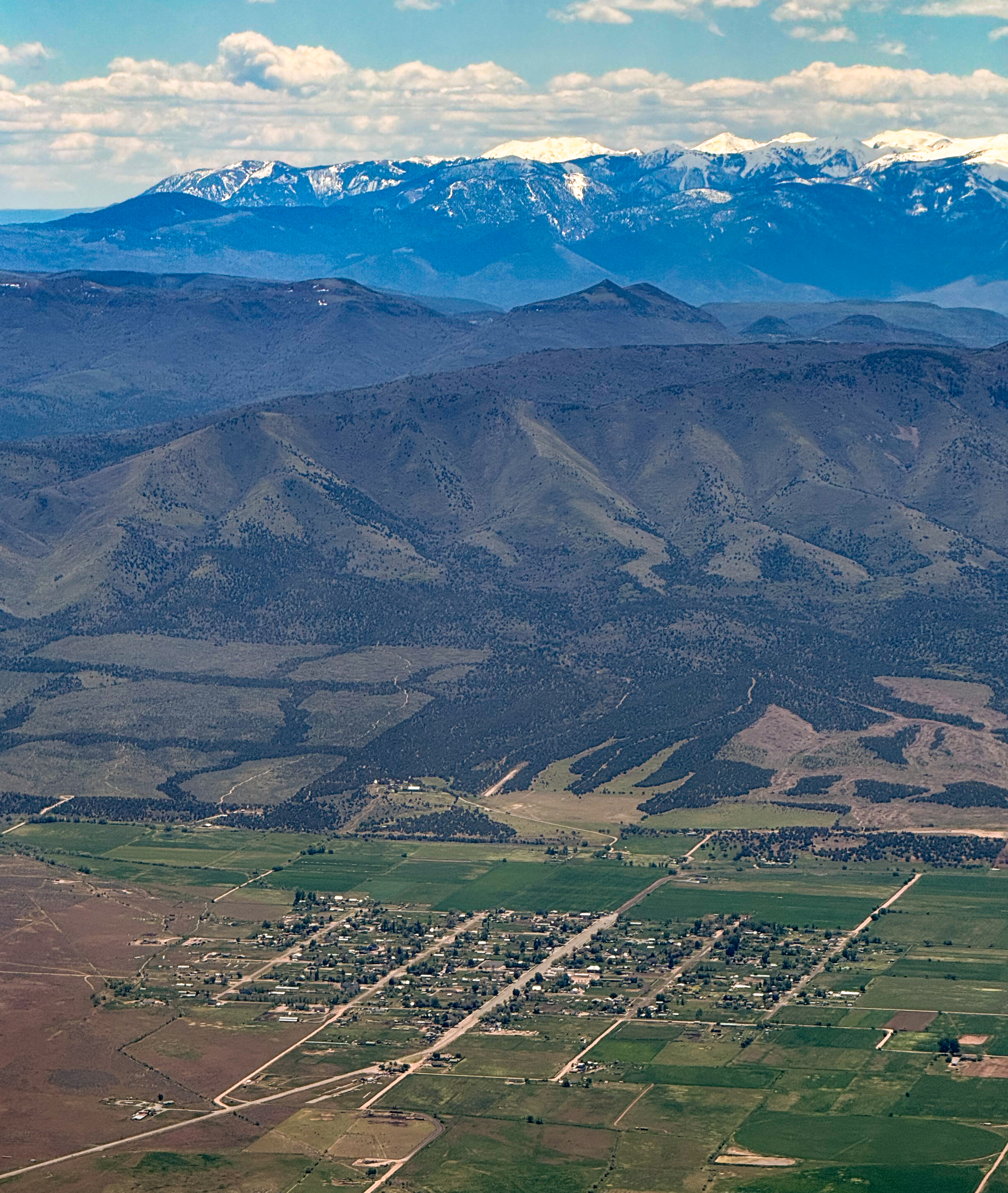
- Meadow and mountains

- Location in Millard County and the state of Utah.
- Coordinates: 38°53′10″N 112°24′26″W
- Country: United States
- State: Utah
- County: Millard
- Settled: 1857

Area
  - Total: 0.51 sq mi (1.31 km^{2})
  - Land: 0.51 sq mi (1.31 km^{2})
  - Water: 0 sq mi (0.00 km^{2})
- Elevation: 4,856 ft (1,480 m)

Population (2020)
  - Total: 320
  - Density: 647.4/sq mi (249.98/km^{2})
- Time zone: UTC-7 (Mountain (MST))
  - Summer (DST): UTC-6 (MDT)
- ZIP code: 84644
- Area code: 435
- FIPS code: 49-48830
- GNIS feature ID: 2412973

Meadow is a town in Millard County, Utah, United States. The population was 320 at the 2020 census. Originally called Meadow Creek, the town is located about eight miles south of Fillmore.

== History ==
From 1847, Meadow Creek was considered a good camp site on the Mormon Road to Southern California. Meadow Creek was the site where Walkara died in 1855. The town of Meadow Creek was settled in 1857 by ten Latter-day Saint families from Fillmore, Utah. The name of the town was changed to Meadow when it acquired its post office in 1864.

== Geography ==
According to the United States Census Bureau, the town has a total area of 0.5 square miles (1.3 km^{2}), all land.

=== Climate ===
This climatic region is typified by large seasonal temperature differences, with warm to hot (and often humid) summers and cold (sometimes severely cold) winters. According to the Köppen Climate Classification system, Meadow has a humid continental climate, abbreviated "Dfb" on climate maps.

Historical population
Census	Pop.	Note	%±
1870	193		—
1880	212		9.8%
1890	344		62.3%
1900	343		−0.3%
1910	331		−3.5%
1920	405		22.4%
1930	395		−2.5%
1940	422		6.8%
1950	378		−10.4%
1960	244		−35.4%
1970	238		−2.5%
1980	265		11.3%
1990	250		−5.7%
2000	254		1.6%
2010	310		22.0%
2020	320		3.2%
U.S. Decennial Census

== Demographics ==
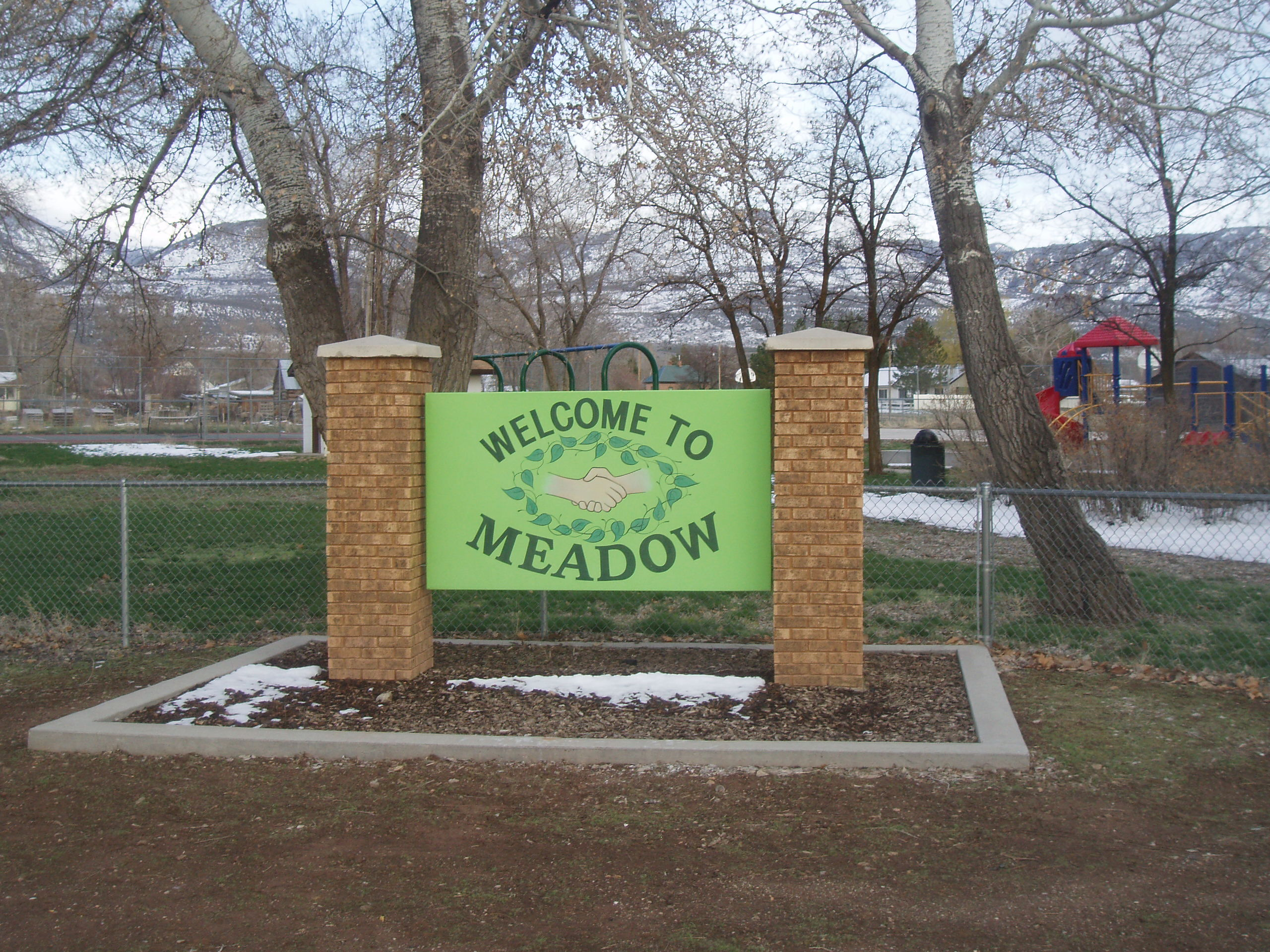
Meadow welcome sign

As of the census of 2000, there were 254 people, 94 households, and 72 families residing in the town. The population density was 513.1 people per square mile (196.1/km^{2}). There were 124 housing units at an average density of 250.5 per square mile (95.8/km^{2}). The racial makeup of the town was 97.64% White, 0.79% Native American, 1.57% from other races. Hispanic or Latino of any race were 1.57% of the population.

There were 94 households, out of which 34.0% had children under the age of 18 living with them, 67.0% were married couples living together, 7.4% had a female householder with no husband present, and 23.4% were non-families. 23.4% of all households were made up of individuals, and 17.0% had someone living alone who was 65 years of age or older. The average household size was 2.70 and the average family size was 3.22.

In the town, the population was spread out, with 32.3% under the age of 18, 7.1% from 18 to 24, 22.8% from 25 to 44, 16.5% from 45 to 64, and 21.3% who were 65 years of age or older. The median age was 36 years. For every 100 females, there were 92.4 males. For every 100 females age 18 and over, there were 100.0 males.

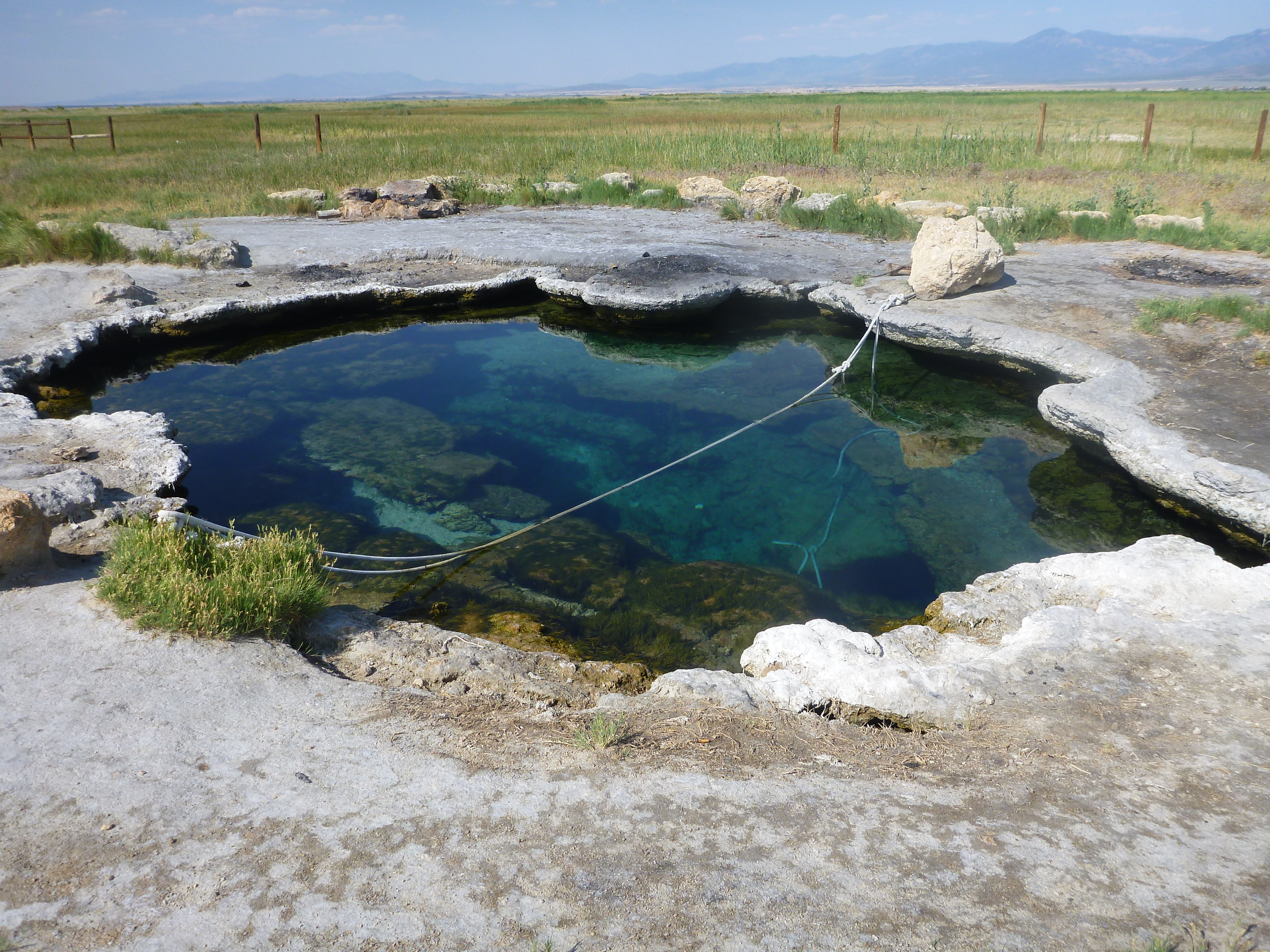
Meadow Hot Springs

The median income for a household in the town was $26,250, and the median income for a family was $34,375. Males had a median income of $26,000 versus $26,250 for females. The per capita income for the town was $13,378. About 6.6% of families and 8.4% of the population were below the poverty line, including 13.4% of those under the age of eighteen and 3.8% of those 65 or over.

== Hot springs ==
A system of hot springs, Meadow Hot Springs are located 1.6 miles from the center of town. The water emerges from an underwater cave in a travertine formation at 106 °F.

== See also ==
- List of cities and towns in Utah
