= Millard County, Utah =

County in Utah, United States

- County
- Old Millard County courthouse

- Location within the U.S. state of Utah
- Coordinates: 39°03′N 113°06′W
- Country: United States
- State: Utah
- Founded: October 4, 1851
- Named for: Millard Fillmore
- Seat: Fillmore
- Largest city: Delta

Area
  - Total: 6,828 sq mi (17,680 km^{2})
  - Land: 6,572 sq mi (17,020 km^{2})
  - Water: 255 sq mi (660 km^{2}) 3.7%

Population (2020)
  - Total: 12,975
  - Estimate (2025): 14,057 ▲
  - Density: 1.974/sq mi (0.7623/km^{2})
- Time zone: UTC−7 (Mountain)
  - Summer (DST): UTC−6 (MDT)
- Congressional district: 2nd
- Website: millardcounty.gov

Millard County (/ˈmɪlərd/ MIL-ərd) is a county in the U.S. state of Utah. As of the 2020 United States census, the population was 12,975. Its county seat is Fillmore, and the largest city is Delta.

== History ==
The Utah Territory legislature created the county on October 4, 1851, with territory not previously covered by county creations and including some area in the future state of Nevada. It was named for the thirteenth US President Millard Fillmore, who was in office then. Fillmore was designated as the county seat. The county boundaries were altered in 1852 and again in 1854. On March 2, 1861, the US government created the Nevada Territory, which effectively de-annexed the described portion of Millard County falling in that Territorial Proclamation. The county boundary was further altered in 1862, 1866, 1888, and in 1919. In 1921 a boundary adjustment with Sevier brought Millard to its present configuration.

Fillmore, located near the geographic center of the territory, was originally built as the capital of Utah Territory. The Utah Territorial Legislature approved a plan to locate the capital in the Pahvant Valley. On October 28, 1851, Utah Governor Brigham Young traveled to the valley and chose the specific site for Fillmore. The town was surveyed that same day. A colonizing company soon followed; they built houses, a grist mill, and a sawmill. Construction of the Territorial Statehouse was initiated in 1852. The Territorial legislature met in Fillmore for the first (and only time) in 1855. The following year they voted to keep the capital in Great Salt Lake City.

== Geography ==
Millard County lies on the west side of Utah. Its west border abuts the east border of the state of Nevada. The county terrain consists of arid, rough undulating flatlands interrupted by numerous hills and mountain ridges. The highest point in the county is Mine Camp Peak in the Central Utah Plateaus, at 10,222 feet (3,116 m) ASL. The county has a total area of 6,828 square miles (17,680 km^{2}), of which 6,572 square miles (17,020 km^{2}) is land and 255 square miles (660 km^{2}) (3.7%) is water. It is the third-largest county in Utah by area.

The Sevier Desert covers much of Millard County, being the seafloor of ancient Lake Bonneville. Sevier Lake, a mostly dry remnant of Lake Bonneville, is in central Millard County. The Pahvant Mountains form the county's eastern boundary. Fillmore and other farming communities lie at the base of the Pahvant Mountains. Delta sits several miles from the banks of the Sevier River in the middle of the basin.

=== Major highways ===
- Interstate 15
- Interstate 70
- US-6
- US-50
- SR-21
- SR-100
- SR-125
- SR-132
- SR-133
- SR-136
- SR-257

=== Adjacent counties ===
- Juab County - north
- Sanpete County - northeast
- Sevier County - southeast
- Beaver County - south
- Lincoln County, Nevada - southwest
- White Pine County, Nevada - west

=== Protected areas ===
- Circus Hollow Wildlife Management Area
- Clear Lake Waterfowl Management Area
- Fishlake National Forest (part)
- Halfway Hill Wildlife Management Area

=== Lakes ===
- Abraham Reservoir
- Alexander Lake
- Antelope Spring (along Cove Creek)
- Antelope Spring Reservoir
- AT T Road Reservoir
- Beaver River Reservoir
- Big Drum Reservoir
- Big Sage Reservoir
- Bitterweed Lake
- Black Point Reservoir
- Black Spring
- Bloom Trail Reservoir
- Borden Basin Reservoir
- Burnt Tree Pond
- Carr Lake
- Cat Canyon Reservoir
- Cedar Pass Reservoir
- Chokecherry Reservoir
- Clay Knoll Reservoir
- Clear Lake
- Clear Spot Reservoirs
- Coates Reservoir
- Cockleburr Lake
- Confusion Hills Reservoir
- Conger Reservoir
- Construction Reservoir
- Coyote Spring (near Beaver River)
- Coyote Spring (Tule Valley)
- Crafts Lake
- Crater Reservoir
- Cricket Reservoir
- Cricket Reservoir Number 2
- D M A D Reservoir
- Danish Reservoir
- Deadman Reservoir
- Deep Lake
- Deseret Reservoirs
- Devils Kitchen Reservoir
- East Antelope Reservoir
- East Hardpan Reservoir
- East Tule Bench Reservoir
- Ecks Knoll Reservoir
- Fillmore Wash Reservoir
- Fool Creek Number Two Reservoir
- Fool Creek Reservoir Number 1
- Foote Reservoir
- Georges Reservoir
- Greener Reservoir
- Gunnison Bend Reservoir
- Halls Double Reservoir
- Hardpan Reservoir
- Headquarters Reservoir
- Highway Reservoir
- Hinckley Trail Reservoir
- Hodgsen Pond
- Hole-in-the-Rock Reservoir
- Horsetrap Reservoir
- Indian Queen Reservoir
- Indian Ranch
- Jackson Pond
- Jensen Spring
- Johnson Pond
- Lakeview Reservoir
- Lawson Cove Reservoir
- Little Drum Reservoir
- Long Ridge Reservoir
- Lower Clay Spring
- Madsen Reservoir
- Miller Canyon Reservoir
- Mormon Gap Reservoir
- Mud Flat Reservoir
- Mud Lake Spring
- Mud Springs
- Needle Hardpan Reservoir
- Needle Reservoir
- Neels Reservoir Number 2
- Nelson Reservoir Number 2
- Nielson Pond
- North Clay Knoll Reservoir
- North Knoll Spring
- Pine Pass Reservoir
- Pony Express Reservoir
- Preuss Lake
- Probst Pond
- Rain Lakes
- Red Rock Number 1 Reservoir
- Red Rock Number 2 Reservoir
- Robins Lake
- Ruths Pond
- Salt Lake
- Salt Marsh Lake
- Scipio Lake
- Sevier Lake
- Sevier Lake Reservoir
- Sevier Lake Reservoir Number 1
- Sevier Lake Reservoir Number 4
- Sevier Lake Reservoir Number 5
- Sevier Lake Reservoir Number 6
- Smelter Knolls Reservoir
- Snake Pass Reservoir
- Soap Hollow Reservoir
- Soap Wash Reservoir
- South Cedar Wash Reservoir
- South Horse Hollow Reservoir
- South Tule Spring
- Spring Lake
- Squidike Spring
- Stage Road Reservoir
- Steamboat Pass Reservoir
- Styler Reservoir
- Swan Lake
- Swan Lake Salt Marsh
- Swasey Hardpan Reservoir
- Swasey Reservoir Number 2
- Swasey Reservoir Number 3
- Swasey Reservoir Number 4
- Swasey Wash Reservoir
- Tamarack Reservoir
- The Lakes
- Thompson Knoll Reservoir
- Topaz Slough
- Tule Spring
- Twin Springs
- Warm Springs
- Watsons Cow Pond
- West Clay Knoll Reservoir
- West Marshall Tract Reservoir
- West Neels Reservoir
- Whirlwind Reservoir
- Willow Spring (near Tule Spring)

=== Great Stone Face ===
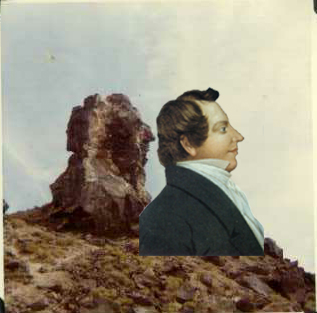
The Great Stone Face and a portrait of Joseph Smith Jr.

Pahvant Valley in Millard County has several ancient lava flows and extinct volcanoes, known as the Black Rock Desert volcanic field, including the "Black Rock" lava flow. About 17 miles (27 km) southwest of Delta, near Black Rock's northwest perimeter is a feature named the "Great Stone Face", which protrudes about four stories above the general elevation. Locals claim that this rock formation, when viewed at the correct angle, appears similar to a profile of Joseph Smith. At ground level, within view of the "Great Stone Face", is a large, smooth-faced rock covered in Native American petroglyphs.

=== Notch Peak ===
Notch Peak is 50 miles (80 km) west of Delta. The skyline appears to have a notch taken out of it when viewed from Delta.

=== Little Sahara Sand Dunes ===
Little Sahara Recreation Area, 25 miles (40 km) north of Delta, is a popular area for ATV riders.

== Demographics ==
Historical population
Census	Pop.	Note	%±
1860	715		—
1870	2,753		285.0%
1880	3,727		35.4%
1890	4,033		8.2%
1900	5,678		40.8%
1910	6,118		7.7%
1920	9,659		57.9%
1930	9,945		3.0%
1940	9,613		−3.3%
1950	9,387		−2.4%
1960	7,866		−16.2%
1970	6,988		−11.2%
1980	8,970		28.4%
1990	11,333		26.3%
2000	12,405		9.5%
2010	12,503		0.8%
2020	12,975		3.8%
2025 (est.)	14,057	▲	8.3%
US Decennial Census; 1790–1960 1900–1990; 1990–2000 2010 2020

=== 2020 census ===
According to the 2020 United States census and 2020 American Community Survey, there were 12,975 people in Millard County with a population density of 1.9 people per square mile (0.7/km^{2}). Among non-Hispanic or Latino people, the racial makeup was 10,636 (82.0%) White, 15 (0.1%) African American, 100 (0.8%) Native American, 141 (1.1%) Asian, 13 (0.1%) Pacific Islander, 27 (0.2%) from other races, and 269 (2.1%) from two or more races. 1,774 (13.7%) people were Hispanic or Latino.

Millard County, Utah – Racial and ethnic composition Note: the US Census treats Hispanic/Latino as an ethnic category. This table excludes Latinos from the racial categories and assigns them to a separate category. Hispanics/Latinos may be of any race.
Race / Ethnicity (NH = Non-Hispanic)	Pop 2000	Pop 2010	Pop 2020	% 2000	% 2010	% 2020
White alone (NH)	11,168	10,589	10,636	90.03%	84.69%	81.97%
Black or African American alone (NH)	13	10	15	0.10%	0.08%	0.12%
Native American or Alaska Native alone (NH)	144	100	100	1.16%	0.80%	0.77%
Asian alone (NH)	59	76	141	0.48%	0.61%	1.09%
Pacific Islander alone (NH)	25	15	13	0.20%	0.12%	0.10%
Other race alone (NH)	7	7	27	0.06%	0.06%	0.21%
Mixed race or Multiracial (NH)	98	103	269	0.79%	0.82%	2.07%
Hispanic or Latino (any race)	891	1,603	1,774	7.18%	12.82%	13.67%
Total	12,405	12,503	12,975	100.00%	100.00%	100.00%

There were 6,581 (50.72%) males and 6,394 (49.28%) females, and the population distribution by age was 4,040 (31.1%) under the age of 18, 6,659 (51.3%) from 18 to 64, and 2,276 (17.5%) who were at least 65 years old. The median age was 36.1 years.

There were 4,299 households in Millard County with an average size of 3.02 of which 3,316 (77.1%) were families and 983 (22.9%) were non-families. Among all families, 2,801 (65.2%) were married couples, 196 (4.6%) were male householders with no spouse, and 319 (7.4%) were female householders with no spouse. Among all non-families, 848 (19.7%) were a single person living alone and 135 (3.1%) were two or more people living together. 1,665 (38.7%) of all households had children under the age of 18. 3,385 (78.7%) of households were owner-occupied while 914 (21.3%) were renter-occupied.

The median income for a Millard County household was $63,221 and the median family income was $67,981, with a per-capita income of $25,479. The median income for males that were full-time employees was $50,906 and for females $34,875. 12.3% of the population and 10.9% of families were below the poverty line.

In terms of education attainment, out of the 7,920 people in Millard County 25 years or older, 820 (10.4%) had not completed high school, 2,565 (32.4%) had a high school diploma or equivalency, 2,763 (34.9%) had some college or associate degree, 1,374 (17.3%) had a bachelor's degree, and 398 (5.0%) had a graduate or professional degree.

== Economy ==
Millard County is working hard to make it easier to build Earthships, straw bale homes, and other ecological and sustainable housing.

Millard County is the home of the Telescope Array Project ultra-high-energy cosmic ray observatory. The Lon and Mary Watson Millard County Cosmic Ray Center was dedicated on March 20, 2006.

== Japanese internment camp ==
The Topaz War Relocation Center was a World War II Japanese internment camp located in Millard County 15 miles (24 km) west of Delta. The location is open to the public, with a memorial at the northwest corner.

== Politics and government ==
Millard County has traditionally voted Republican. In no national election since 1944 has the county selected the Democratic Party candidate (as of 2024).

State elected offices
Position	District	Name	Affiliation	First elected
Senate	24	Derrin Owens	Republican	2020
House of Representatives	68	Merrill Nelson	Republican	2012
Board of Education	14	Mark Huntsman	Nonpartisan	2014

United States presidential election results for Millard County, Utah
Year	Republican		Democratic		Third party(ies)	
Year	No.	%	No.	%	No.	%
1896	166	10.71%	1,384	89.29%	0	0.00%
1900	938	52.55%	844	47.28%	3	0.17%
1904	1,001	59.23%	683	40.41%	6	0.36%
1908	1,011	55.73%	765	42.17%	38	2.09%
1912	970	41.10%	865	36.65%	525	22.25%
1916	1,293	40.31%	1,804	56.23%	111	3.46%
1920	2,199	62.56%	1,167	33.20%	149	4.24%
1924	1,917	55.74%	1,025	29.81%	497	14.45%
1928	2,263	60.83%	1,440	38.71%	17	0.46%
1932	1,916	49.70%	1,881	48.79%	58	1.50%
1936	1,466	38.25%	2,313	60.34%	54	1.41%
1940	1,943	45.66%	2,302	54.10%	10	0.24%
1944	1,889	49.67%	1,909	50.20%	5	0.13%
1948	2,184	54.21%	1,817	45.10%	28	0.69%
1952	2,994	69.74%	1,299	30.26%	0	0.00%
1956	2,667	69.09%	1,193	30.91%	0	0.00%
1960	2,248	61.15%	1,425	38.76%	3	0.08%
1964	1,973	57.44%	1,462	42.56%	0	0.00%
1968	2,318	66.06%	971	27.67%	220	6.27%
1972	2,689	70.48%	777	20.37%	349	9.15%
1976	2,484	62.68%	1,224	30.89%	255	6.43%
1980	3,620	79.79%	795	17.52%	122	2.69%
1984	4,345	78.11%	1,192	21.43%	26	0.47%
1988	3,515	74.63%	1,124	23.86%	71	1.51%
1992	2,496	52.33%	742	15.56%	1,532	32.12%
1996	2,681	63.29%	945	22.31%	610	14.40%
2000	3,850	80.63%	696	14.58%	229	4.80%
2004	4,084	83.74%	626	12.84%	167	3.42%
2008	3,653	77.08%	758	15.99%	328	6.92%
2012	4,478	88.59%	431	8.53%	146	2.89%
2016	3,860	73.26%	431	8.18%	978	18.56%
2020	5,404	87.73%	624	10.13%	132	2.14%
2024	5,558	87.02%	713	11.16%	116	1.82%

== Communities ==
Map of Millard County communities

=== Cities ===
- Delta
- Fillmore (county seat)

=== Towns ===
- Hinckley
- Holden
- Kanosh
- Leamington
- Lynndyl
- Meadow
- Oak City
- Scipio

=== Census-designated places ===
- Deseret
- Oasis
- Sutherland

=== Unincorporated communities ===
- Abraham
- Black Rock
- Border
- Burbank
- Cove Fort
- EskDale
- Flowell
- Fool Creek
- Gandy
- Garrison
- Hatton
- McCornick
- Sugarville
- Woodrow

=== Former communities ===
- Bloom
- Borden
- Clear Lake
- Greenwood
- Ibex
- Sunflower
- Topaz
- Van

== Education ==
The school district is Millard School District.

== Gallery ==
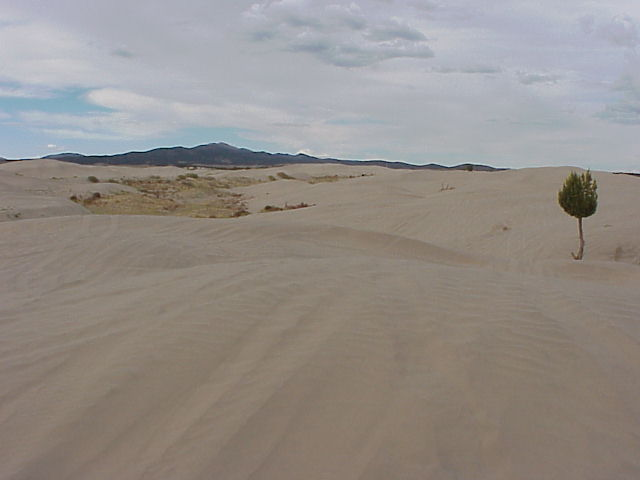
Little Sahara Sand Dunes

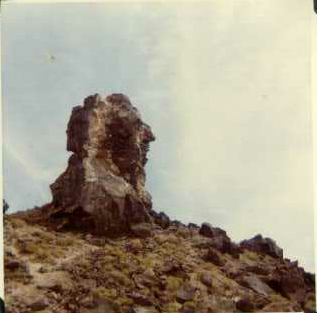
The Great Stone Face

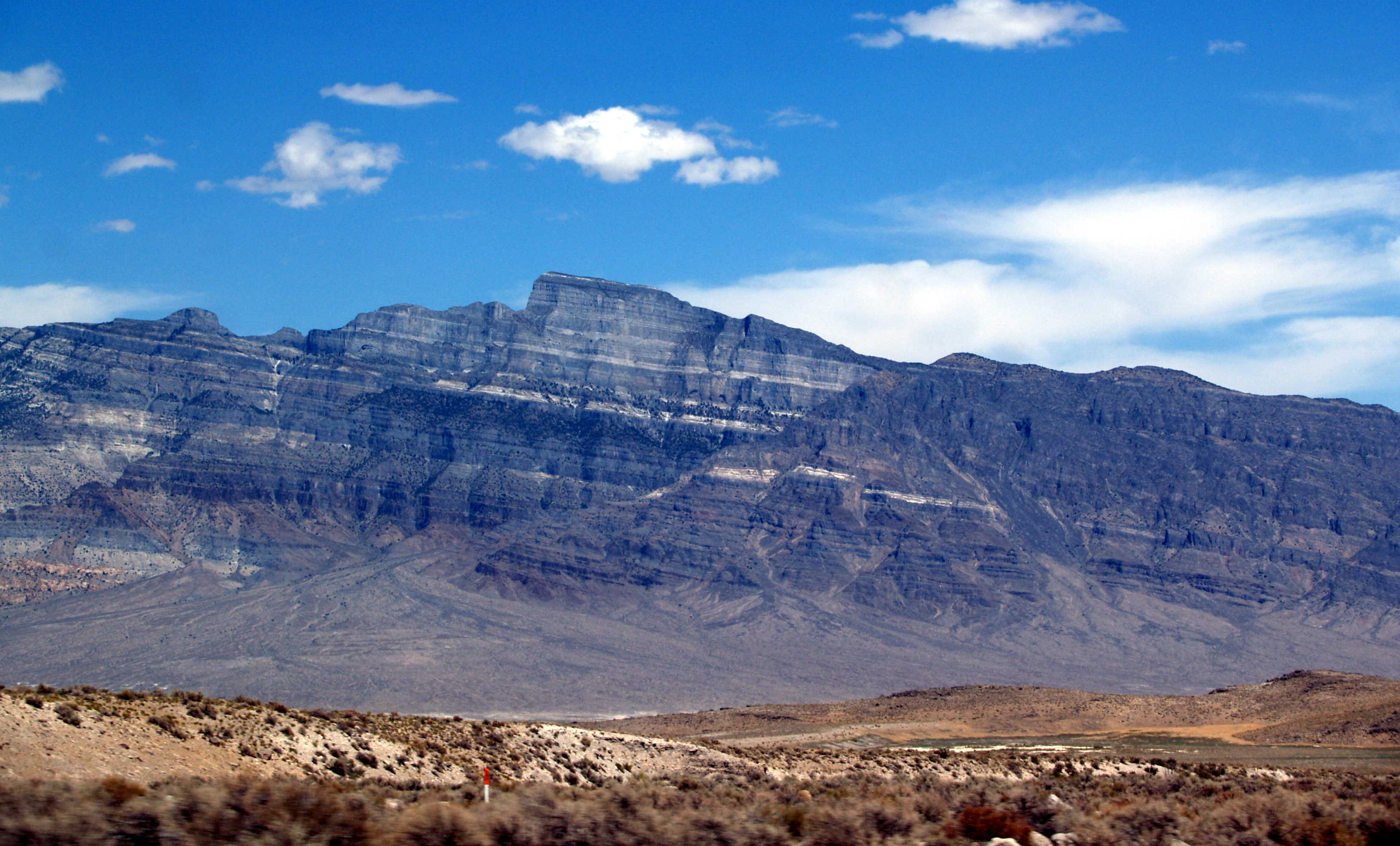
Notch Peak as seen from the south on the valley floor

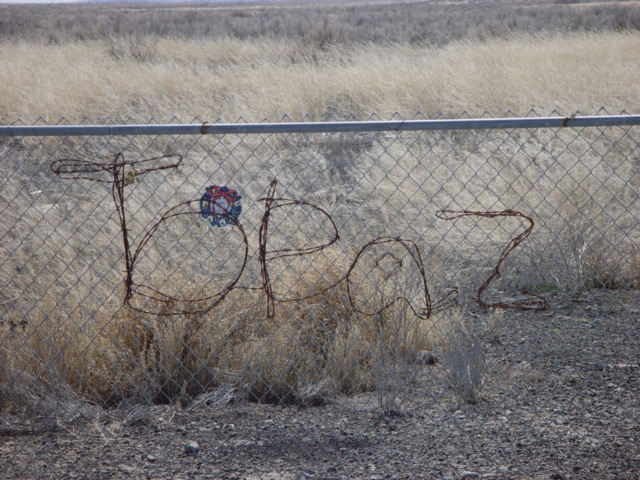
Topaz Internment Camp

== See also ==
- Cove Fort, Utah
- National Register of Historic Places listings in Millard County, Utah
- USS Millard County (LST-987)
- Willden Fort
