= Utah State Route 32 =

State highway in Wasatch and Summit counties in Utah, United States

State Route 32

Route information
- Maintained by UDOT
- Length: 29.053 mi (46.756 km)
- Existed: 1989–present

Major junctions
- South end: US 40 / US 189 near Heber City
- SR-35 in Francis; SR-248 in Kamas; SR-150 in Kamas
- North end: I-80 / US 189 in Wanship

Location
- Country: United States
- State: Utah
- Counties: Wasatch, Summit

Highway system
- Utah State Highway System; Interstate; US; State; Minor; Scenic
← SR-31	→ SR-34

State Route 32 (SR-32) is a state highway in Wasatch and Summit Counties in the U.S. state of Utah. Most of the highway is an old routing of U.S. Route 189 that became disconnected from the rest of US-189 during the construction of the Jordanelle Reservoir. SR-32 runs for 29.053 miles (46.756 km) from US-40 and US-189 north of Heber City to I-80 near Wanship. Although signed US-189 or US-189 Alternate for most of its history, the highway pre-dates the creation of U.S. Highways and has had several numerical designations and route changes through the years.

== Route description ==
The modern SR-32 begins running north from the US-40/US-189 junction north of Heber City. It curves east to run along the southern edge of the Jordanelle Reservoir and provides access to Jordanelle State Park. It continues east to cross into Summit County and meets the western terminus of SR-35 in Francis. In Francis, SR-32 turns more northerly and meets SR-248 and SR-150 at Kamas. SR-32 runs through Marion and runs parallel to the Weber River between Oakley and Peoa. The route then travels along the western side of Rockport Lake and Rockport State Park before ending about one mile (1.6 km) past an interchange with I-80 in Wanship.

== History ==
The road from Kamas to Wanship was added to the state highway system in 1910, as part of the main highway from Salt Lake City to Echo. A branch from Kamas south to Francis and then southeast through Woodland was added in 1914, and in 1927, the state legislature designated SR-35 along the highway south and southeast from Wanship, which then stretched to Tabiona. State Route 151 was made in 1933 as a connection from US-40 at Hailstone (now under the Jordanelle Reservoir) to SR-35 at Woodland, and in 1935, a short spur of SR-151 to SR-35 in Francis became State Route 89. SR-151's east end was moved to Francis in 1953, absorbing SR-89.

When US-189 was created in 1938, it overlapped US-40 between Heber and Kimball Junction, but it was soon modified to leave US-40 at Hailstone and follow what is now all SR-32 through Kamas to Wanship. For a time, US-189 was moved back to the 1938 routing, with US-189 Alternate on the Kamas route, but by the 1977 renumbering it was back in Kamas, eliminating SR-151 and truncating SR-35.

The Utah Department of Transportation (UDOT) built a relocation of US-40 in the late 1980s to bypass the valley that would be filled by the Jordanelle Reservoir. UDOT had intended to keep what is now SR-32 as US-189 via building a new connection along the north shore of the reservoir. Part of the route south of the connection to the new road would be designated an extension to SR-35 and the rest would be given to the county. However, Summit and Wasatch Counties did not wish to maintain the roadway west from Francis, and the Federal Highway Administration pointed out that the realignment of US-189 would take it out of the way by more than 15 miles (24 km). In 1990, UDOT ceded to these requests; the new route built for US-189 was instead signed as an extension of SR-248. A new iteration of State Route 32 was designated to replace the non-contiguous portion of former US-189. US-189 was moved to overlap US-40 and I-80 through the area. As part of a mileage swap, SR-32 was extended along former county routes to reconnect to US-189 and connect to US-40 via the southern shore of the reservoir. At the same time, portions of SR-190, SR-220, and SR-224 were given to Wasatch County to maintain.

== Major intersections ==
County	Location	mi	km	Destinations	Notes
Wasatch	Heber City	0.000	0.000	US 40 / US 189 – Heber, Provo, Vernal	Southern terminus
Summit	Francis	10.404	16.744	SR-35 east – Duchesne	
Summit	Kamas	12.429	20.003	SR-248 west (200 South) – Park City	
Summit	Kamas	12.655	20.366	SR-150 east (Center Street) – Mirror Lake	
Summit	Wanship	28.193– 28.478	45.372– 45.831	I-80 / US 189 – Salt Lake City, Cheyenne	I-80 exit 155
Summit	Wanship	29.053	46.756	End Maintenance sign	Northern terminus
1.000 mi = 1.609 km; 1.000 km = 0.621 mi
