= Utah State Route 248 =

State highway in Summit and Wasatch Counties, Utah, United States

State Route 248
- Kearns Boulevard

Route information
- Maintained by UDOT
- Length: 14.481 mi (23.305 km)
- Existed: 1953–present

Major junctions
- West end: SR-224 in Park City
- US 40 / US 189 near Park City
- East end: SR-32 in Kamas

Location
- Country: United States
- State: Utah

Highway system
- Utah State Highway System; Interstate; US; State; Minor; Scenic
← SR-243	→ SR-252

State Route 248 is a highway in northern Utah, connecting Park City with Kamas. In Park City it is known as Kearns Boulevard.

== Route description ==
From its western terminus in Park City, SR-248 begins at State Route 224 and heads east on Kearns Boulevard as a four-lane road with a center turn lane. After approximately 0.5 miles (0.80 km), the route narrows to two lanes before passing by Park City High School and leaving the city limits. Soon afterwards, it crosses US-40/US-189 at a diamond interchange. SR-248 then turns to the southeast, crossing into Wasatch County, passing the areas of Deer Mountain and Hideout located above Jordanelle Reservoir. The route then turns back to the east, re-entering Summit County. It soon enters Kamas as 200 South and terminates at SR-32 (Main Street). This terminus is located two blocks south of the western terminus of SR-150.

The portion of the route between SR-224 and US-40 is included in the National Highway System.

== History ==
The first state roads in the Park City area were designated in 1910, and met at Kamas Junction, a three-way intersection at 40°39′18″N 111°24′50″W, now located between the Jordanelle Reservoir and the present alignment of SR-248 in Jordanelle State Park. One of these highways headed west to Park City Junction, north to Kimball Junction, and west to Salt Lake City, generally following the present SR-248, SR-224, and I-80. Another went east to Kamas and then north via Wanship to Echo near the present SR-248, SR-32, and I-80, and the third went south to Heber City through the valley now flooded by the reservoir and along US-40. A cutoff from Kimball Junction east to Wanship, added in 1917, shortened the distance between Salt Lake City and Echo. The State Road Commission assigned route numbers in the 1920s, with SR-4 (later US-530 east of Kimball Junction) running via Salt Lake City, Kimball Junction, Wanship, and Echo, and SR-6 (later US-40) splitting at Kimball Junction and running via Park City Junction, Kamas Junction, and Heber City. The roadway from Kamas Junction to Wanship via Kamas did not receive a number until 1927, when the state legislature labeled the Kamas Junction-Kamas portion as State Route 34 and the remainder as part of SR-35, which continued southeast from Kamas to Tabiona. At that time, the present extent of SR-248 - Park City Junction to Kamas — was part of SR-6 (US-40) and all of SR-34.

With the addition of two other connections between SR-6 and SR-35 - SR-196 (Browns Canyon) in 1931 and SR-151 (now part of SR-32) in 1933 - SR-34 was no longer necessary, and was removed from the state highway system in 1953. To the west, SR-6 was moved to a shorter alignment between SR-4 at Silver Creek Junction and the former route northeast of Park City in 1953, and the old route via Park City Junction became SR-248, initially signed as US-40 Alternate. In 1969, the portion north of Park City Junction was transferred to SR-224, which continued south from the junction into downtown Park City. Now SR-248 was a short connection between SR-224 and SR-6 (US-40).

The Utah Department of Transportation built a relocation of US-40 in the late 1980s to get it out of the valley that would be filled by the Jordanelle Reservoir. At the time, US-189 overlapped US-40 from Heber City north to Hailstone (now covered by the lake), where it turned east and north along the present SR-32 to Wanship. Because US-189 east of Hailstone would be covered by the lake, UDOT built a new alignment, roughly following the pre-1953 SR-34, going west from Kamas to existing US-40 near the north end of the lake, where it would head northwest along existing US-40 to that route's new alignment, and then turn south for a longer overlap. What would remain of the old US-189 between Hailstone and Francis would become a county road, along with a new connection to US-40 south of the reservoir; the short piece from Francis to Kamas would be part of a new SR-32 that would also replace SR-35. This was all carried out in 1989, but Summit and Wasatch Counties did not wish to maintain the roadway west from Francis, and the Federal Highway Administration pointed out that the realignment of US-189 would take it out of the way by more than 15 miles (24 km), so in 1990 the change was partially reversed and modified. SR-35 was restored east of Francis, US-189 was moved to overlap US-40 all the way to Silver Creek Junction, and SR-32 replaced former US-189 north of Kamas, as well as the county road to US-40 south of the reservoir. The road that had been built as a realignment of US-189, from US-40 north of the reservoir to Kamas, instead became an extension of SR-248. At the same time, portions of SR-190 and SR-224, and all of SR-220, were given to Wasatch County to maintain, resulting in an approximately equal mileage swap.

== Major intersections ==
County	Location	mi	km	Destinations	Notes
Summit	Park City	0.000	0.000	SR-224 (Park Avenue)	Western terminus
Summit		3.118	5.018	US 40 / US 189 – Heber City	Grade-separated interchange, US-40 exit 4
Wasatch	No major junctions				
Summit	Kamas	14.481	23.305	SR-32 (Main Street) – Jordanelle Reservoir, Oakley	Eastern terminus
1.000 mi = 1.609 km; 1.000 km = 0.621 mi
