= National Register of Historic Places listings in Duchesne County, Utah =

Location of Duchesne County in Utah

This is a list of the National Register of Historic Places listings in Duchesne County, Utah.

This is intended to be a complete list of the properties and districts on the National Register of Historic Places in Duchesne County, Utah, United States. Latitude and longitude coordinates are provided for many National Register properties and districts; these locations may be seen together in a map.

There are 37 properties and districts listed on the National Register in the county. 34 of these properties are archaeological sites in Nine Mile Canyon, and little is publicly made available about those sites beyond their names, almost all of which are given as Smithsonian trinomial codes. Another two properties were once listed but have been removed.

This National Park Service list is complete through NPS recent listings posted March 21, 2025.

== Current listings ==
	Name on the Register	Image	Date listed	Location	City or town	Description
1	42Dc306		November 30, 2009 (#09001040)	Address Restricted	Wellington	Archaeological site in Nine Mile Canyon
2	42Dc0331		September 12, 2012 (#12000772)	Address Restricted	Wellington	Archaeological site in Nine Mile Canyon
3	42Dc0530		September 12, 2012 (#12000773)	Address Restricted	Wellington	Archaeological site in Nine Mile Canyon, a scattering of stone artifacts
4	42Dc638		November 30, 2009 (#09001039)	Address Restricted	Wellington	Archaeological site in Nine Mile Canyon, including a storage cist, rock alignment, and stone artifacts
5	42Dc0645		September 12, 2012 (#12000774)	Address Restricted	Wellington	Archaeological site in Nine Mile Canyon, a prehistoric cairn
6	42Dc682		November 30, 2009 (#09001026)	Address Restricted	Wellington	Archaeological site in Nine Mile Canyon, a historical-era campsite consisting of a campfire ring and artifact
7	42Dc683		November 30, 2009 (#09001027)	Address Restricted	Wellington	Archaeological site in Nine Mile Canyon, a rock shelter containing evidence of maize agriculture
8	42Dc684		November 30, 2009 (#09001038)	Address Restricted	Wellington	Archaeological site in Nine Mile Canyon, a storage cist
9	42Dc685		November 30, 2009 (#09001037)	Address Restricted	Wellington	Archaeological site in Nine Mile Canyon, a rock alignment
10	42Dc686		November 30, 2009 (#09001036)	Address Restricted	Wellington	Archaeological site in Nine Mile Canyon, including two granaries
11	42Dc687		November 30, 2009 (#09001035)	Address Restricted	Wellington	Archaeological site in Nine Mile Canyon, a rock alignment
12	42Dc688		November 30, 2009 (#09001034)	Address Restricted	Wellington	Archaeological site in Nine Mile Canyon
13	42Dc696		November 30, 2009 (#09001025)	Address Restricted	Wellington	Archaeological site in Nine Mile Canyon, an improved trail through a breach in the north canyon face, lined with a stone wall and wooden cross beams
14	42Dc700		November 30, 2009 (#09001022)	Address Restricted	Wellington	Archaeological site in Nine Mile Canyon
15	42Dc702		November 30, 2009 (#09001033)	Address Restricted	Wellington	Archaeological site in Nine Mile Canyon, a single pithouse with rock alignment and petroglyphs
16	42Dc703		November 30, 2009 (#09001031)	Address Restricted	Wellington	Archaeological site in Nine Mile Canyon, a rock shelter
17	42Dc704		November 30, 2009 (#09001030)	Address Restricted	Wellington	Archaeological site in Nine Mile Canyon, a walled structure built on a cliff, with two granaries and some artifacts
18	42Dc705		November 30, 2009 (#09001023)	Address Restricted	Wellington	Archaeological site in Nine Mile Canyon
19	42Dc708		November 30, 2009 (#09001029)	Address Restricted	Wellington	Archaeological site in Nine Mile Canyon, a single pithouse with some ceramic and stone artifacts
20	42Dc709		November 30, 2009 (#09001028)	Address Restricted	Wellington	Archaeological site in Nine Mile Canyon, a granary
21	42Dc710		November 30, 2009 (#09001024)	Address Restricted	Wellington	Archaeological site in Nine Mile Canyon
22	42Dc712		November 30, 2009 (#09001032)	Address Restricted	Wellington	Archaeological site in Nine Mile Canyon, a pithouse
23	42Dc1302		September 12, 2012 (#12000775)	Address Restricted	Wellington	Archaeological site in Nine Mile Canyon, including a fence and wall with petroglyphs
24	42Dc1618		September 12, 2012 (#12000776)	Address Restricted	Wellington	Archaeological site in Nine Mile Canyon, a granary
25	42Dc1619		September 12, 2012 (#12000758)	Address Restricted	Wellington	Archaeological site in Nine Mile Canyon, including petroglyphs
26	42Dc1620		September 12, 2012 (#12000837)	Address Restricted	Wellington	Archaeological site in Nine Mile Canyon, including petroglyphs
27	Centennial House		November 30, 2009 (#09001042)	Address Restricted	Wellington	Archaeological site in Nine Mile Canyon
28	Fool's Pinnacle		November 30, 2009 (#09001041)	Address Restricted	Wellington	Archaeological site in Nine Mile Canyon, a circular stone structure with a small square window atop a high pinnacle, very difficult to access
29	Indian Canyon Ranger Station		October 28, 1999 (#99001294)	State Route 33 in the Duchesne Ranger District; 39°55′37″N 110°40′34″W	Duchesne	
30	Karen's Cist		November 30, 2009 (#09001043)	Address Restricted	Wellington	Archaeological site in Nine Mile Canyon
31	Maxies Pad		November 30, 2009 (#09001044)	Address Restricted	Wellington	Archaeological site in Nine Mile Canyon
32	Myton Presbyterian Church	Myton Presbyterian Church	September 18, 2017 (#100001638)	225 E 100 S 40°11′36″N 110°03′35″W	Myton	
33	Nordell's Fort		November 30, 2009 (#09001045)	Address Restricted	Wellington	Archaeological site in Nine Mile Canyon, a coursed masonry structure, 7 feet (2.1 m) high, located on a narrow rock outcropping
34	Redman Village	Redman Village	November 30, 2009 (#09001047)	Address Restricted	Wellington	Archaeological site in Nine Mile Canyon, a cluster of stone shelters on a terrace overlooking the canyon, named for a red anthropomorphic pictograph on the adjacent cliff
35	Stockmore Ranger Station	Stockmore Ranger Station	November 12, 1999 (#99001293)	State Route 35 in the Duchesne Ranger District; 40°28′11″N 110°50′24″W	Tabiona	
36	Sunstone Village		November 30, 2009 (#09001046)	Address Restricted	Wellington	Archaeological site in Nine Mile Canyon, a group of rock shelters on a narrow mesa with precipitous drops on all but one side
37	Taylor's City		November 30, 2009 (#09001048)	Address Restricted	Wellington	Archaeological site in Nine Mile Canyon

== Former listing ==
	Name on the Register	Image	Date listed	Date removed	Location	City or town	Description
1	Simmons Ranch		August 18, 1992 (#92000463)	June 21, 2024	8 miles (13 km) south of U.S. Route 40; 40°07′27″N 110°46′36″W	Fruitland	
2	Toyack Future Farmers of America Chapter House		May 18, 1984 (#84002175)	April 28, 2005	340 North 300 West	Roosevelt	Demolished in July 2003.

== See also ==
- List of National Historic Landmarks in Utah
- National Register of Historic Places listings in Utah
