= Utah State Route 35 =

State highway in Summit, Wasatch, and Duchesne counties in Utah, United States

State Route 35

Route information
- Maintained by UDOT
- Length: 62.012 mi (99.799 km)
- Existed: 1910 as a state highway; 1927 as SR-35–present
- Restrictions: Closed in winter from mile 12 to 27

Major junctions
- West end: SR-32 in Francis
- SR-208 near Tabiona
- East end: SR-87 near Duchesne

Location
- Country: United States
- State: Utah

Highway system
- Utah State Highway System; Interstate; US; State; Minor; Scenic
← SR-34	→ SR-36

State Route 35 is a highway in northern Utah connecting SR-32 in Francis to SR-87 in Duchesne in a span of sixty-two miles.

== Route description ==
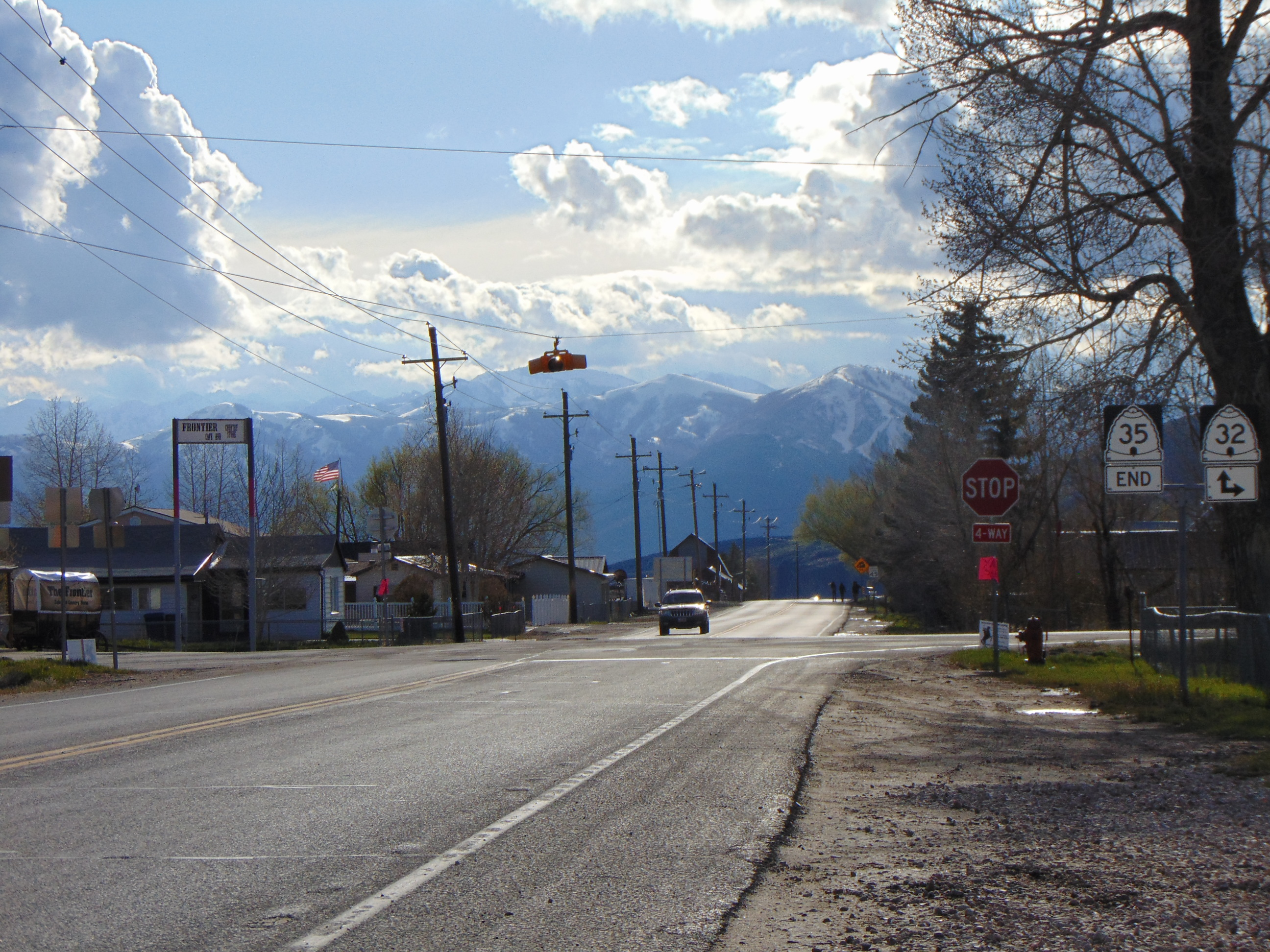
Western terminus in Francis

From its western terminus in Francis, the highway runs southeast to the junction of Soapstone Basin Road, where it turns south. Afterwards it heads in an easterly direction to Hanna, where it turns southeast and then east to the eastern terminus near Duchesne. Located less than an hour from Downtown Salt Lake City, this route is a favorite day ride for many Wasatch Front locals.

== History ==
The road from Wanship south to Kamas was added to the state highway system in 1910 as part of the route from Salt Lake City to Echo via Park City Junction. In 1914, a branch was added from Kamas southeast to Stewart's Ranch (beyond Woodland); it was extended to Stockmore in 1918. The legislature extended it farther to Tabiona in 1927 and assigned the SR-35 designation to the entire route from (US-530, eventually US-189, now I-80) at Wanship to Tabiona. In 1931, it was extended to US-40 in Duchesne, where it would end for many years. A regional renumbering in 1964 saw the east end cut back to the junction with SR-87 north of Duchesne, as SR-87 was extended south to that city.

State Route 241 was a loop along Bench Creek Road east of Woodland. It was created in 1947 and existed until 1969.

When US-189 was created in 1938, it overlapped US-40 between Heber and Kimball Junction, but it was soon modified to leave US-40 at Hailstone (now under the Jordanelle Reservoir) and mostly follow the present SR-32 through Kamas to Wanship (including what was then SR-35 north of Francis). For a time, US-189 was moved back to the 1938 routing, with US-189 Alternate on the Kamas route, but by the 1977 renumbering it was back in Kamas, and SR-35 was removed from the Francis-Wanship roadway (where it had not been signed for many years). In 1989, SR-35 became part of a new SR-32 as one of many changes caused by the flooding of the Jordanelle Reservoir, but the changes were partially reverted in 1990, and SR-35 was restored to its 1977 alignment.

== Major intersections ==
County	Location	mi	km	Destinations	Notes
Summit	Francis	0.000	0.000	SR-32 – Jordanelle, Kamas	Western terminus
Duchesne	Tabiona	44.939	72.322	SR-208 south (36000 West)	
Duchesne	Talmage	62.012	99.799	SR-87 – Duchesne	Eastern terminus
1.000 mi = 1.609 km; 1.000 km = 0.621 mi
