= Abraham Marchant =

Mormon pioneer

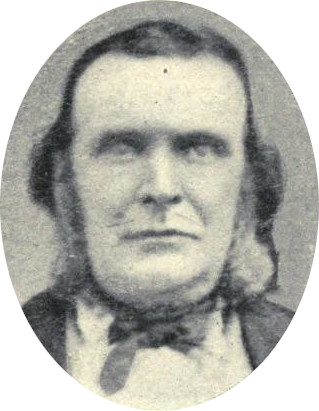
- Born: March 17, 1816; Bath, England
- Died: October 6, 1881 (aged 65); Peoa, Utah
- Spouse: Lydia Johnson

Abraham Marchant (March 17, 1816 – October 6, 1881) was an early Mormon leader and one of the founders of Peoa, Utah.

== Biography ==
Marchant was born on March 17, 1816, in Bath, England, where he was baptized into the Church of Jesus Christ of Latter Day Saints in 1844 and became the leader of the Latter Day Saints in Bath and Birmingham.

Marchant's father was a firefighter in Bath who died trying to rescue a servant girl from a fire. He died months before his son's birth.

After an apprenticeship he became a successful merchant tailor in Bath. He grew into a tall man with a full build. He fell in love with a young milliner, Lydia Johnson and they secretly married February 17, 1837, before his apprenticeship was up.

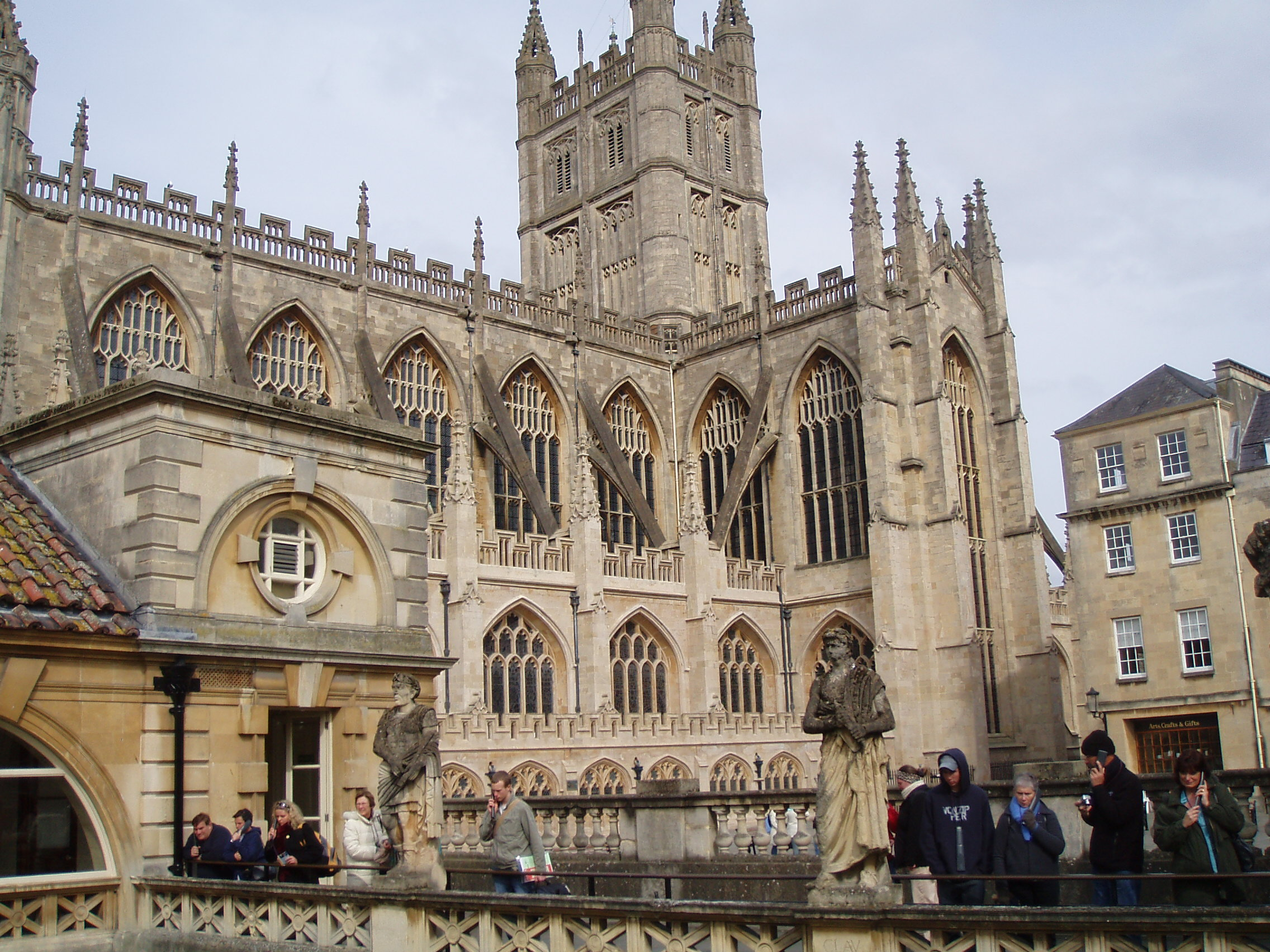
Bath Abbey in Bath, England

Mormon missionaries began preaching in Bath in 1843, and in early 1844 Lydia became interested in the religion. Abraham discouraged her participation, and when he found out she was to be baptized, he set out to stop her. However, on the way he was delayed by a mad bull, and by the time he made it to the place where baptisms were being performed, he was too late. However, he later changed his mind about this new religion and within a month he was also baptized.

Some of the Marchant acquaintances accepted their decision to join the Mormons, while others belittled them. One group of influential people were able to assign a young man with mental impairment as Abraham's apprentice, whom they encouraged to be as belligerent as possible. The young man reportedly hit Lydia several times and once threatened her with a butcher knife.

Abraham invested four pounds five shillings (about 250 pounds as of 2005) in a joint stock company set up to move Mormon emigrants to the United States. However, the individuals put in charge of the company mismanaged the funds, and investors lost most of their capital. Those in charge were disfellowshipped from the church and church leaders faced the task of consoling members who had lost their savings. John Taylor came to Bath for this purpose. After dispelling whatever bitterness the Marchants may have felt, Taylor returned to their home often and became a lifelong friend.

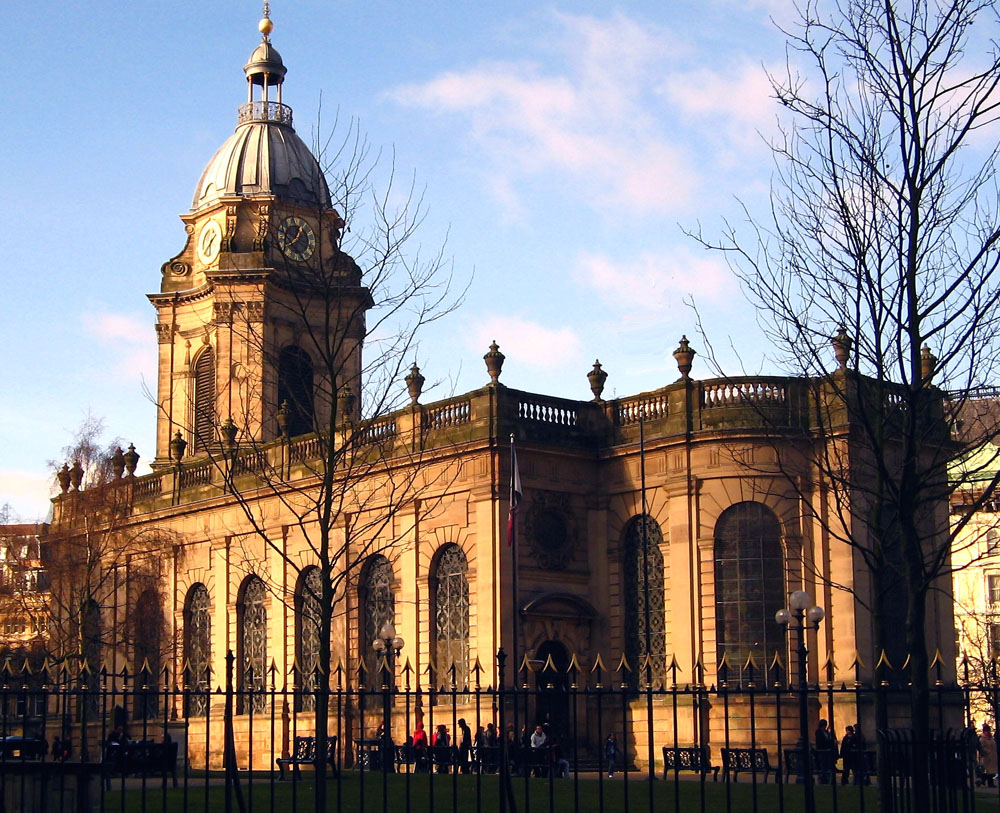
St. Philip's Cathedral, Birmingham, England

The Marchants longed to immigrate to the United States, but waited until they had the money. In need of accumulating eight pounds per family member (about GBP 550 in modern money) for passage to the United States, in late 1851 the Marchants moved to Birmingham, a bustling industrial city where tailor services were in demand and customers were less likely to bother about Abraham's religion. His reputation in the church preceded him and he was immediately appointed to the Birmingham Conference presidency.

Despite the staid Victorian environment in England at the time, when the church announced the doctrine of plural marriage, Abraham reported that "a great spirit of inquiry respecting the Patriarchal order of Marriage was manifested" among church members in Birmingham.

By February 1854, Abraham had saved the money to emigrate and booked ordinary passage for himself, Lydia, and their eight children on the Windermere. He paid for the tickets himself rather than relying on the Perpetual Emigration Fund (PEF). The ship sailed on February 22 and arrived in New Orleans on April 20. However, when they arrived in St. Louis, the cost of equipment and provisions for crossing the plains had recently doubled, forcing them to turn to the PEF for help.

Marchant arrived with other settlers in the area now known as Peoa in 1862 and was soon named "First Elder" and then Bishop of the settlement. As more settlements sprang up within Summit County, he acted as the Bishop of over the entire southern half of the county, including Peoa, Rockport, Wanship, and Kamas. He served in that capacity until his death.

Marchant was the first postmaster in the town. He also led the company that converted Abes Lake in the Uintas into a reservoir. The lake is named after him.

Marchant died on October 6, 1881, at age 65 of heart disease.
