= Rockport =

Rockport may refer to:

== Locations ==
=== Canada ===
- Rockport, New Brunswick
- Rockport, Ontario

=== United States ===
- Rockport, Arkansas
- Rockport, California
- Rockport, Illinois
- Rockport, Indiana
  - Rockport Generating Station
- Rockport, Kansas
- Rockport, Kentucky
- Rockport, Maine
- Rockport, Massachusetts, a New England town
  - Rockport (CDP), Massachusetts, the main village in the town
  - Rockport (MBTA station), a railroad station in the town
- Rockport, Michigan
- Rockport, Mississippi
- Rock Port, Missouri
- Rockport, Ohio
- Rockport Township, a defunct township of Cuyahoga County, Ohio
- Rockport, Texas
- Rockport, Washington
  - Rockport, Wetzel County, West Virginia
  - Rockport, Wood County, West Virginia
- Rockport Colony, South Dakota
- Rockport Lake, a reservoir behind Wanship Dam in Utah
  - Rockport, Utah, a ghost town now under Rockport Lake
- Rockport State Park (Washington)
- Rockport State Recreation Area, Michigan

== Others ==
- Rockport (company), a manufacturer of footwear
- Rockport Publishers, a producer of books for the graphic design, architecture, and interior design industries
- Rockport School, an independent school in County Down, Northern Ireland
- Rockport, the fictional setting of Need for Speed: Most Wanted (2005)
