= Utah State Route 208 =

State highway in Duchesne County, Utah, United States

State Route 208

Route information
- Maintained by UDOT
- Length: 10.205 mi (16.423 km)
- Existed: 1941–present
- Restrictions: Restrictions for oversized vehicles are the same as for all Utah State Routes (Note: The Utah Department of Transportation (UDOT) defines oversized vehicles as any vehicle exceeding any of the following: 10 feet (3.0 m) in width, 105 feet (32 m) in overall length, or 14 feet (4.3 m) in height. Oversized vehicles are prohibited on all state highways in Utah (unless otherwise permitted) during designated and defined major holidays periods (holiday periods exceed the actual day of the holiday). In addition, travel by oversized vehicles, plus any with an overhang of more than 10 feet (3.0 m), is restricted to daylight hours.)

Major junctions
- South end: US 40 east of Fruitland
- North end: SR-35 southeast of Tabiona

Location
- Country: United States
- State: Utah
- Counties: Duchesne

Highway system
- Utah State Highway System; Interstate; US; State; Minor; Scenic
← SR-204	→ SR-209

State Route 208 (SR-208) is a 10.205-mile (16.423 km), north–south state highway on the Uintah and Ouray Indian Reservation in the Uinta Basin in eastern Duchesne County, Utah, United States, that connects U.S. Route 40 (US-40) with Utah State Route 35 (SR-35).

== Route description ==
SR-208 runs through a very rural area as a two-lane road, not passing near any communities and not intersecting with any significant side roads along its course. Though fairly lightly traveled, it functions as a somewhat important western connection between US-40 and SR-35 that can reduce travel distances by over 31 miles (50 km) by bypassing Duchesne.

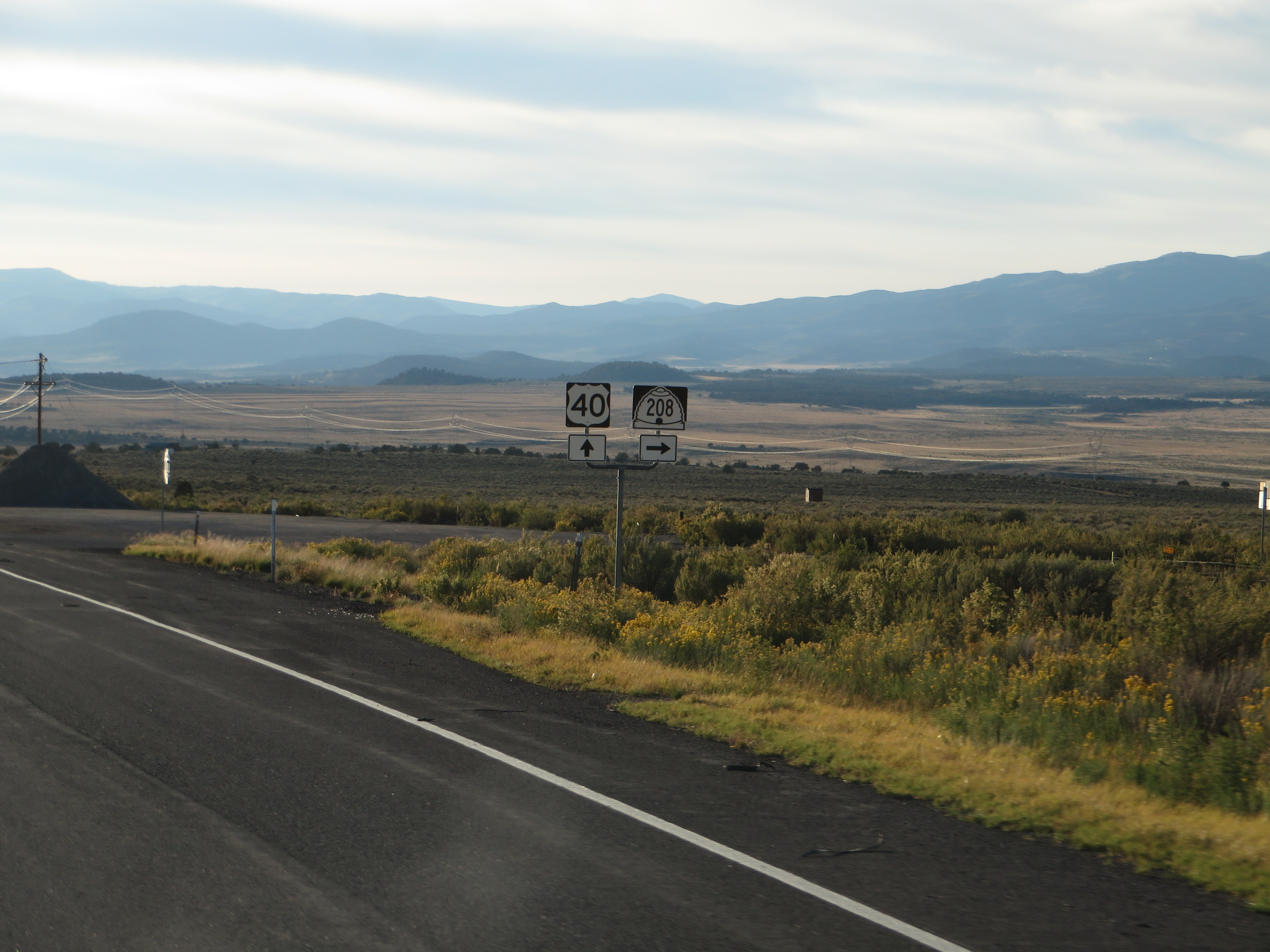
The southern terminus of SR-208, at its junction with US-40, September 2016

The highway begins at an intersection with US-40, about one mile (1.6 km) west of the Pinion Rest Area on US-40, about 6.3 miles (10.1 km) east of Fruitland, and about 18.2 miles (29.3 km) west of Duchesne. (From the intersection, US-40 heads east toward Duchesne, Roosevelt, and Vernal and west toward Heber City, Provo, and Salt Lake City. Hatch Knife Road [39300 West] heads southerly from the intersection as a dirt road into the foothills of Cedar Mountain.)

From its southern terminus, SR-208 heads north–northeast for about 2 miles (3.2 km) before reaching a T intersection with 4 C's Ranch Road (the only named side road along the highway), connecting with several unnamed side dirt roads along the way. (4 C's Ranch Road heads southeasterly into the 4 C's Ranch.) After continuing north–northeast for about another mile (1.6 km) and just after going over a very low mountain pass, SR-208 curves slightly west. The highway then continues on a nearly northward course for about another mile (1.6 km) as it crosses the Santaquin Draw. For the next 3.9 miles (6.3 km) the highway traverses a series of gradual curves through the lowest of the southeast foothills of Tabby Mountain.

Just after an S-curve to the east, SR-208 begins a 1.5-mile (2.4 km) east–northeast descent down Golden Stairs Canyon. At the mouth of that canyon, SR-208 crosses the Duchesne River as it curves to head north for its last half mile (0.8 km). Immediately after crossing over the Hicken Ditch irrigation canal, SR-208 reaches its northern terminus at a T intersection with SR-35, about 2.7 miles (4.3 km) southeast of Tabiona. (SR-35 heads southeasterly to its own [eastern] terminus at Utah State Route 87, which in turn, proceeds south to Duchesne. SR-35 heads northwesterly to Tabiona, Hanna, Heber City, and Park City.)

== Legal definition ==
The legal definition of State Route 208 is as follows:

72-4-126. State highways—SR-201 to SR-204, SR-208 to SR-211.
(5) SR-208. From Route 40 east of Fruitland northerly to Route 35 near Tabiona.[9]

== Traffic ==
Annual average daily traffic history

Annual average daily traffic
Year	AADT
2019	424
2018	419
2017	403
2016	393
2015	375
2014	355
2013	350
2012	335
2011	345
2010	345
2009	340
2008	335
2007	340
2006	340
2005	310
2004	300
2003	285
2002	235
2001	220
2000	215
1999	255
1998	245
1997	239
1996	230
1995	220
1994	205
1993	240
1992	235
1991	215
1990	175
1989	165
1988	160
1987	265
1986	275
1985	285
1984	285
1983	275
1982	270
1981	270

The Utah Department of Transportation (UDOT) collects data for the State Highways and Local Federal-Aid roads. Traffic is measured in both directions and reported Annual Average Daily Traffic (AADT). AADT is collected for major intersections and "sections where traffic volumes show a substantial increase or decrease". Reported traffic data for the entire length of SR-208. As of 2019, SR-208 had an AADT of 424. Since 1981, traffic along the highway has increased by nearly 93 percent.

Travel restrictions along SR-208 only apply to oversized vehicles and are the same as those which UDOT has established that apply to all state highways in within the state.

== History ==
SR-208 was designated in 1941 by the Utah State Road Commission as running "from a point on route 6 [US-40] approximately six miles east of Fruitland in Duchesne County, thence northerly to route 35 at a point near Tabiona". The route has remained unchanged since then.

== Major intersections ==
The entire route is in Duchesne County.

Location	mi	km	Destinations	Notes
	0.000	0.000	39300 West (Hatch Knife Road) south	Road continuing south from southern terminus
	0.000	0.000	US 40 east – Duchesne, Roosevelt, Vernal US 40 west – Heber City, Provo, Salt Lake City	Southern terminus
	9.688– 9.704	15.591– 15.617	Bridge over the Duchesne River	
	10.192	16.402	Hicken Ditch canal crossing	
	10.205	16.423	SR-35 east – Duchesne SR-35 west – Tabiona, Hanna, Heber City, Park City	Northern terminus; T intersection
1.000 mi = 1.609 km; 1.000 km = 0.621 mi

== See also ==
- List of state highways in Utah
