= Utah State Route 319 =

Highway in Utah

State Route 319

Route information
- Maintained by UDOT
- Length: 1.203 mi (1.936 km)
- Existed: 1989–present

Major junctions
- West end: US 40 / US 189 near Keetley
- East end: Jordanelle State Park fee station

Location
- Country: United States
- State: Utah
- Counties: Wasatch

Highway system
- Utah State Highway System; Interstate; US; State; Minor; Scenic
← SR-318	→ SR-320

State Route 319 (SR-319) is a state highway in the U.S. state of Utah. Located entirely within Wasatch County, it connects US-40/US-189 to Jordanelle State Park.

== Route description ==
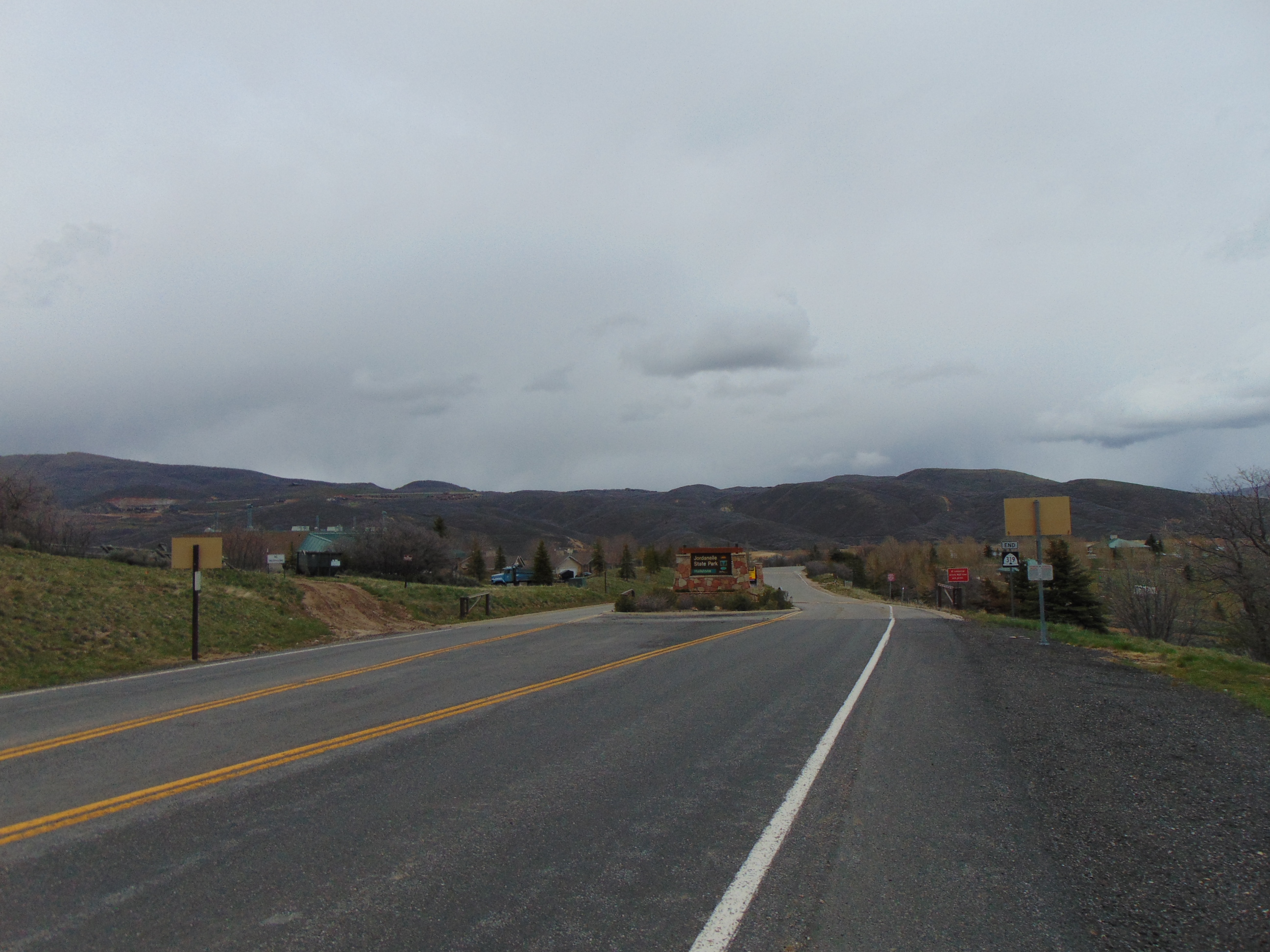
Eastern terminus at the entrance to Jordanelle State Park

SR-319 begins at US-40/US-189 at the Mayflower interchange (exit 8 on that highway) and proceeds to the east as a two-lane roadway with a center turn lane. The route passes a large hotel complex before veering to the southeast, towards the Jordanelle Reservoir. After entering the boundaries of Jordanelle State Park, it turns to the south and terminates at the state park fee booth.

== History ==
In conjunction with the construction of the Jordanelle Reservoir in the late 1980s, a new state park was proposed on its western shore, with an access road connecting it to the new alignment of US-40/189. UDOT recommended this connection be added to the state highway system. Since the purpose of the new route would be to serve a state park, it was given a number greater than 280.

On November 3, 1989, the Utah Transportation Commission approved the designation, which initially extended from US-40/189 east to the proposed boat ramp, a distance of 0.99 miles (1.59 km); however, the eastern 0.55 miles (0.89 km) had not been constructed at the time. The route was slightly modified in 2001, when the legislature moved the east end to the state park fee station.

== Major intersections ==
The entire route is in Wasatch County.

Location	mi	km	Destinations	Notes
	0.000	0.000	Cattle guard	Western terminus
	0.015– 0.129	0.024– 0.208	US 40 / US 189 – Park City, Heber City	Grade-separated interchange, US-40 exit 8
Jordanelle State Park	0.902	1.452	Seasonal gate	
Jordanelle State Park	1.203	1.936	Fee station	Eastern terminus
1.000 mi = 1.609 km; 1.000 km = 0.621 mi
