= Stockmore Ranger Station =

- U.S. National Register of Historic Places
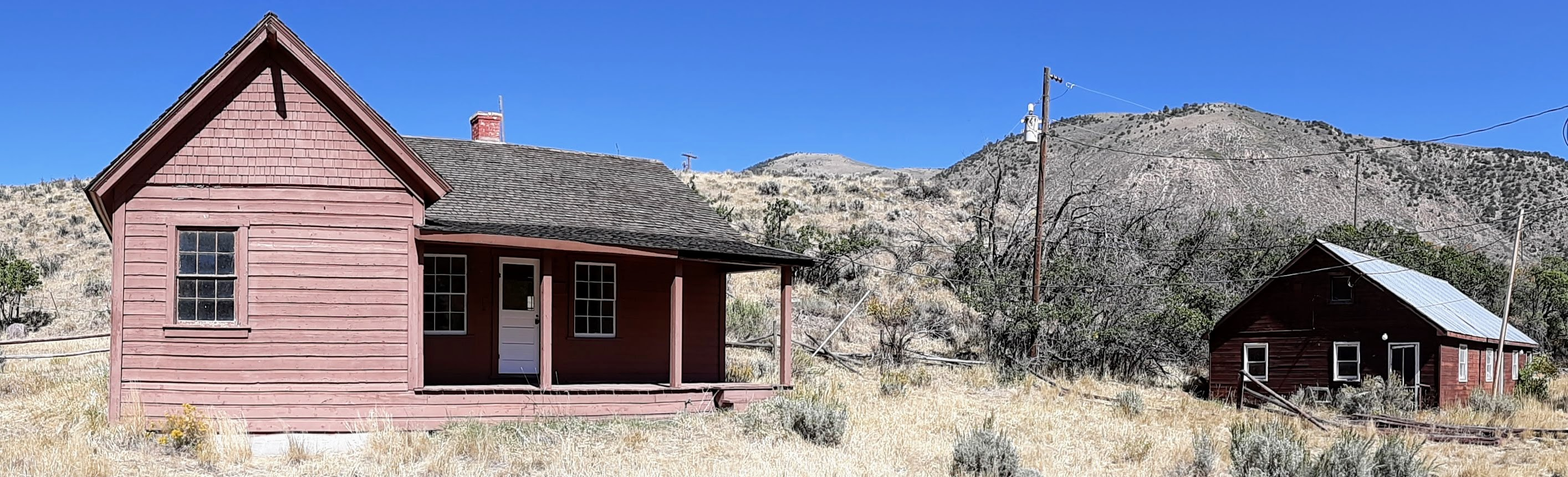
- Station and bunkhouse, September 2018

- Location within Utah Location within the United States
- Nearest city: Tabiona, Utah
- Coordinates: 40°28′11″N 110°50′24″W
- Area: 1 acre (0.40 ha)
- Built: c. 1914
- Built by: U.S. Forest Service
- Architect: U.S. Forest Service architects
- NRHP reference No.: 99001293
- Added to NRHP: November 12, 1999

The Stockmore Ranger Station, is a ranger station in Ashley National Forest in Duchesne County, Utah, United States, near Tabiona, that is listed on the National Register of Historic Places (NRHP).

== Description ==
The station was built in c.1914 and is located off State Route 35, about 40 miles (64 km) northwest of Duchesne. It was a work of U.S. Forest Service architects. It was listed on the NRHP in 1999; the listing included five contributing buildings and five non-contributing buildings and structures, built from c.1914 to 1985.

It is significant as a memento of the early days of the U.S. Forest Service, which had been established in 1905. The station established a Federal presence and its main building is one of the "earliest remaining structures on the Ashley National Forest built specifically by the Forest Service to house a ranger." It is named for the former town of Stockmore, about 1/4 mile to the east, which had been abandoned around 1906 after it was discovered that supposed gold strike in the area had been a fraud.

== See also ==
- National Register of Historic Places listings in Duchesne County, Utah
- Indian Canyon Ranger Station, also NRHP-listed in Duchesne County
