= Lost Josephine Mine =

Legendary Spanish gold mine on Hoyt's Peak, Utah

The Lost Josephine Mine, also known as the Josephine de Martinique, is a legendary gold and silver mine purportedly located on Hoyt's Peak in Summit County, Utah. Situated approximately 10 miles east of Kamas, Utah, the mine is a prominent fixture of Utah folklore. While treasure hunters and modern prospectors have claimed to find evidence of its existence, the site is classified by state and federal records as a calcite quarry rather than a precious metal mine, and no archaeological evidence of colonial Spanish mining has been verified at the location.

== Historical context and folklore ==
The legend of the Josephine mine suggests that Spanish explorers or priests operated a high-yield mine on Hoyt's Peak as early as the late 18th century. Regional lore is often based on "waybills"—cryptic maps allegedly left behind by Spaniards. One such legend claims the mine was abandoned following conflicts with the Ute people, with the entrance sealed to protect "bar silver and bar gold."

Proponents of the mine's existence point to "prayer trees"—ancient pines deformed into specific shapes—and rock carvings as trail markers left by miners. However, archaeologists from the U.S. Forest Service have noted that the "Jesuit" origin story is historically inconsistent, as the Jesuit order was expelled from Spanish territories in 1767, years before the purported date of the mine's operation in 1782.

== Modern activity and "Goldcite" ==
In 2013, local resident Gary Holt gained significant attention by claiming he had located the Josephine shaft on Hoyt's Peak. Holt did not find gold veins, but he extracted a mineral he branded as "Goldcite"—a form of orange, fibrous calcite. While Holt claimed the mineral was a sign of nearby gold deposits, the Utah Geological Survey and the Forest Service identified the material as common calcite. Holt was granted a "Small Mining Operation" permit, but officials clarified the permit was for "decorative stone" rather than precious metals.

== Skepticism and geological reality ==
Archaeologists and geologists maintain a skeptical view of the Lost Josephine Mine. Tom Flanagan, a retired Forest Service archaeologist, has categorized the search as "treasure-hunting fantasies," explaining that "symbols" carved in trees or rocks are often natural marks or modern additions. Geologically, Hoyt's Peak is composed of sedimentary rock (limestone) and quartzite, which do not typically host the type of volcanic intrusions required for large gold and silver deposits. To date, no Spanish-era artifacts such as smelting furnaces, tools, or pottery have been recovered from the site.

== See also ==
- Lost Rhoades Mine
- Dream Mine
- Summit County, Utah
