= Rockport, Utah =

Rockport
- Ghost town
- Location within Utah Location within the United States
- Coordinates: 40°45′40″N 111°23′17″W
- Country: United States
- State: Utah
- County: Summit
- Established: 1860
- Abandoned: 1953

Rockport is a ghost town in a narrow part of Weber Valley at the mouth of Three Mile Canyon in Summit County, Utah, United States. Located 4 miles (6.4 km) south of Wanship, it was inhabited for nearly a century before the creation of Rockport Reservoir, which covered almost the whole townsite.

Today, the area is home to the Lake Rockport Estates subdivision/development.

== History ==
Historical population
Census	Pop.	Note	%±
1870	113		—
1880	127		12.4%
1890	133		4.7%
1900	147		10.5%
1910	116		−21.1%
1920	101		−12.9%
1930	109		7.9%
1940	91		−16.5%
1950	83		−8.8%

The first European American settlers came to the area in 1860. They named their settlement Crandall, renaming it Enoch City the next year. Freezing winter temperatures and deep snow made life difficult, but the pioneers stayed, building their own gristmill in 1863. In 1866, however, when the outbreak of the Black Hawk War caused widespread fear of Ute attacks, the colony was completely evacuated to Wanship. The next year they moved back, but built a rock wall around the entire settlement for defense. This wall, 2 feet (0.61 m) thick and 8 feet (2.4 m) high, changed Enoch City's name again, to Rock Fort. Once the Ute troubles had passed, the wall was torn down and used to construct other buildings. No longer a fort, the town received its permanent name, Rockport.

In 1872 a concrete building, made with Portland cement produced in nearby Hoytsville, was erected to house the first store in town, a general store which doubled as the post office. A rock quarry was developed, producing stone for many area buildings. A good source of fuller's earth was found in Rockport, and there was also a sawmill.

For many years the population of Rockport stayed over 100, but it finally declined in the 1940s. The post office and school were closed, but there were still 27 families living here in the 1950s when the government decided to construct the Wanship Dam. Despite the protests of these families and the majority of Summit County voters in a 1952 special election, the government purchased the entire valley in preparation for the construction of the dam. The lake it created, Rockport Reservoir, flooded the town. When the water level is low, old foundations and streets can sometimes be seen, but the only remnant of Rockport above the water is its little cemetery, sitting on a ridge above the lake. Some of Rockport's historic buildings were moved to Pioneer Village, at Lagoon Amusement Park in Farmington.

== See also ==
- List of ghost towns in Utah
