= Peoa, Utah =

- Census-designated place
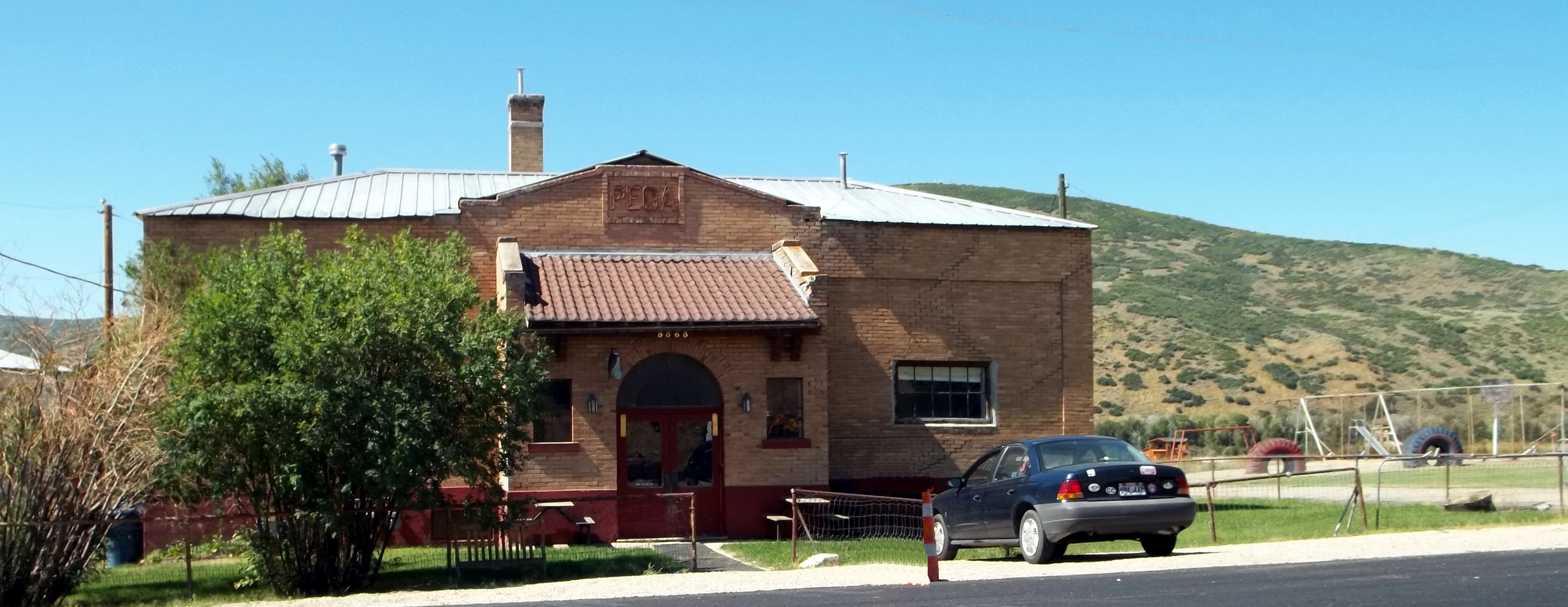
- Building in Peoa, Utah

- Location in Summit County and the state of Utah
- Coordinates: 40°44′34″N 111°21′25″W
- Country: United States
- State: Utah
- County: Summit
- Settled: 1857
- Elevation: 6,234 ft (1,900 m)

Population (2020)
  - Total: 249
- Time zone: UTC-7 (Mountain (MST))
  - Summer (DST): UTC-6 (MDT)
- ZIP code: 84061
- Area code: 435
- GNIS feature ID: 2584774

Peoa ( /piːˈoʊə/ pee-OH-ə) is an unincorporated census-designated place in southwestern Summit County, Utah, United States, between Jordanelle and Rockport State Parks. It lies along State Route 32, south of the city of Coalville, the county seat of Summit County. The population was 249 at the 2020 census. Peoa is unincorporated with the ZIP code of 84061.

Peoa was first settled in 1857 by William W. Phelps and others.

== Demographics ==
Historical population
Census	Pop.	Note	%±
2010	253		—
2020	249		−1.6%

As of the census of 2010, there were 253 people living in the CDP. There were 109 housing units. The racial makeup of the town was 93.3% White, 0.8% Asian, 5.1% from some other race, and 0.8% from two or more races. Hispanic or Latino of any race were 9.9% of the population.

== Climate ==
This climatic region is typified by large seasonal temperature differences, with warm to hot (and often humid) summers and cold (sometimes severely cold) winters. According to the Köppen Climate Classification system, Peoa has a humid continental climate, abbreviated "Dfb" on climate maps.

== Economy ==
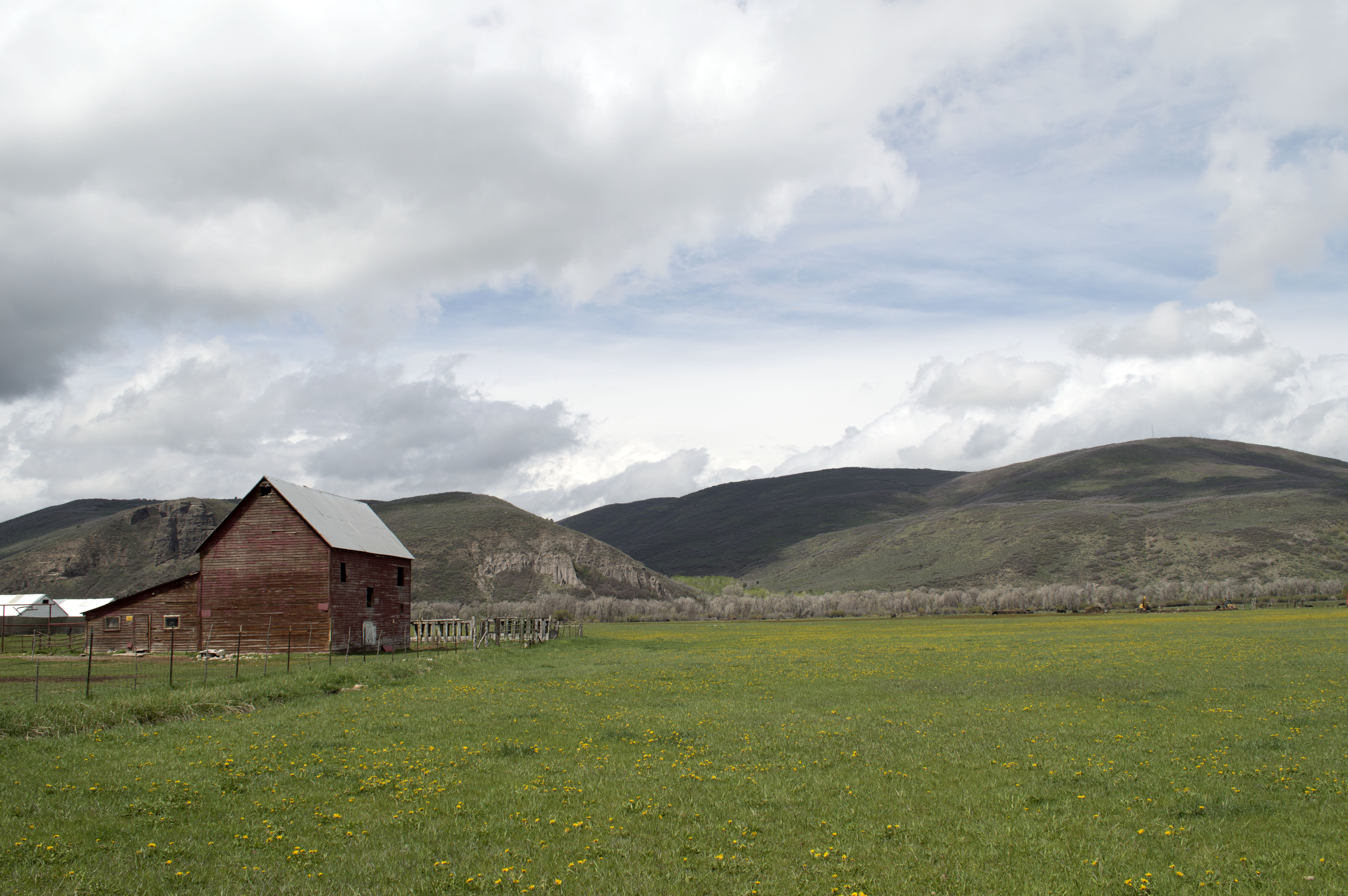
Looking west from Woodenshoe Lane in Peoa, May 2016

Mink farming was previously one of the town's major industries but has since declined. Other industries that contribute to the economy of Peoa are a large rock quarry, the birthing and first-year raising of beef/cattle and growing hay. Horses, goats, alpaca and buffalo are among the other animals raised and or boarded in this area.

Peoa has basically two roads, one of which is called "Wooden Shoe Road." The name was given to the road in part by the number of Dutch and Scandinavian settlers that lived in the area who wore wooden clogs or wooden shoes. There may have been an old shop that at one point sold wooden shoes. The other road is SR-32.

== Education ==
It is in the South Summit School District.

== See also ==
- List of census-designated places in Utah
