= Hanna, Utah =

Unincorporated community in the state of Utah, United States

- Unincorporated community
- Location of Hanna within the State of Utah Hanna (the United States)
- Coordinates: 40°24′15″N 110°45′55″W
- Country: United States
- State: Utah
- County: Duchesne
- Named for: William P. Hanna
- Elevation: 6,765 ft (2,062 m)
- Time zone: UTC-7 (Mountain (MST))
  - Summer (DST): UTC-6 (MDT)
- ZIP codes: 84031
- GNIS feature ID: 1428509

Hanna is an unincorporated community in western Duchesne County, Utah, United States, on the Uintah and Ouray Indian Reservation.

== Description ==
Historical population
Census	Pop.	Note	%±
1920	263		—
1930	190		−27.8%
1940	220		15.8%
1950	193		−12.3%
Source: U.S. Census Bureau

The community lies along State Route 35 (SR‑35) and the Duchesne River, approximately 5 miles (8.0 km) northwest of the town of Tabiona and 25 miles (40 km) northwest of the city of Duchesne, the county seat of Duchesne County. Its elevation is 6,765 feet (2,062 m). Although Hanna is unincorporated, it has its own ZIP code of 84031 and, for many years, even had its own post office.

Hanna was named for its original postmaster, William P. Hanna. Historically, the name Defas Park (a former resort in Hanna, with a dance hall and cabins) often appeared on maps at the location of the community, with the name Hanna appearing at a location further west. However, the former post office was located along SR-‑35, but about 3.5 miles (5.6 km) northwest of the main community.

== Climate ==
This climatic region is typified by large seasonal temperature differences, with warm to hot (and often humid) summers and cold (sometimes severely cold) winters. According to the Köppen Climate Classification system, Hanna has a humid continental climate, abbreviated "Dfb" on climate maps.

Climate data for Hanna, Utah, 1953–present normals and extremes
Month	Jan	Feb	Mar	Apr	May	Jun	Jul	Aug	Sep	Oct	Nov	Dec	Year
Record high °F (°C)	58 (14)	61 (16)	68 (20)	80 (27)	88 (31)	94 (34)	96 (36)	96 (36)	93 (34)	84 (29)	69 (21)	60 (16)	96 (36)
Mean maximum °F (°C)	48.3 (9.1)	51.0 (10.6)	59.8 (15.4)	69.7 (20.9)	78.5 (25.8)	86.9 (30.5)	90.9 (32.7)	88.8 (31.6)	84.3 (29.1)	75.3 (24.1)	60.5 (15.8)	49.9 (9.9)	91.9 (33.3)
Mean daily maximum °F (°C)	34.6 (1.4)	38.5 (3.6)	45.2 (7.3)	54.2 (12.3)	64.5 (18.1)	75.7 (24.3)	82.8 (28.2)	80.2 (26.8)	72.3 (22.4)	61.0 (16.1)	45.4 (7.4)	36.0 (2.2)	57.5 (14.2)
Daily mean °F (°C)	21.5 (−5.8)	25.8 (−3.4)	32.1 (0.1)	40.5 (4.7)	49.4 (9.7)	58.7 (14.8)	65.7 (18.7)	63.4 (17.4)	55.5 (13.1)	45.6 (7.6)	31.9 (−0.1)	23.1 (−4.9)	42.8 (6.0)
Mean daily minimum °F (°C)	8.5 (−13.1)	13.1 (−10.5)	18.9 (−7.3)	26.8 (−2.9)	34.3 (1.3)	41.8 (5.4)	48.7 (9.3)	46.6 (8.1)	38.8 (3.8)	30.1 (−1.1)	18.4 (−7.6)	10.1 (−12.2)	28.0 (−2.2)
Mean minimum °F (°C)	−10.7 (−23.7)	−5.0 (−20.6)	3.7 (−15.7)	14.2 (−9.9)	23.2 (−4.9)	31.2 (−0.4)	39.6 (4.2)	36.7 (2.6)	26.8 (−2.9)	17.5 (−8.1)	2.2 (−16.6)	−8.6 (−22.6)	−14.4 (−25.8)
Record low °F (°C)	−27 (−33)	−27 (−33)	−13 (−25)	−4 (−20)	12 (−11)	25 (−4)	33 (1)	24 (−4)	8 (−13)	5 (−15)	−14 (−26)	−32 (−36)	−32 (−36)
Average precipitation inches (mm)	0.92 (23)	0.91 (23)	0.82 (21)	0.79 (20)	1.12 (28)	0.94 (24)	0.99 (25)	1.37 (35)	1.16 (29)	1.06 (27)	0.78 (20)	0.97 (25)	11.83 (300)
Average snowfall inches (cm)	13.1 (33)	11.2 (28)	4.6 (12)	1.7 (4.3)	0.3 (0.76)	0.0 (0.0)	0.0 (0.0)	0.0 (0.0)	0.4 (1.0)	0.6 (1.5)	5.5 (14)	11.4 (29)	48.8 (123.56)
Average extreme snow depth inches (cm)	11.2 (28)	11.4 (29)	6.3 (16)	0.5 (1.3)	0.0 (0.0)	0.0 (0.0)	0.0 (0.0)	0.0 (0.0)	0.2 (0.51)	0.3 (0.76)	2.4 (6.1)	7.4 (19)	15.4 (39)
Average precipitation days (≥ 0.01 in)	5.2	4.9	5.2	5.5	6.9	5.5	6.6	7.7	5.5	4.8	4.8	5.1	67.7
Average snowy days (≥ 0.1 in)	4.7	3.8	1.9	0.8	0.1	0.0	0.0	0.0	0.1	0.3	1.8	3.5	17
Source: NOAA (precip/precip days 1952–2001, snow/snow days/snow depth 1952–1994)
