= Thomas Rhoads =

American Mormon pioneer, prospector, and early LDS Church member

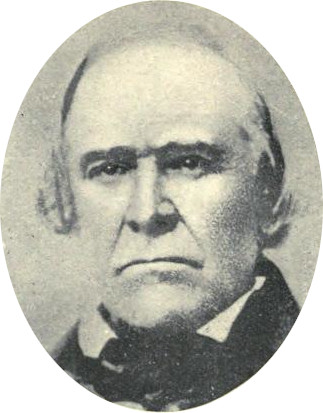
- Born: July 13, 1796; Muhlenberg County, Kentucky
- Died: February 20, 1869 (aged 72); Minersville, Utah
- Known for: Mining pioneer in California and Utah

Thomas Foster Rhoads (also spelled Rhoades; July 13, 1796 – February 20, 1869) was an American trail blazer, frontiersman, prospector, and early member of The Church of Jesus Christ of Latter-day Saints (LDS Church). He is noted for his leadership during the Mormon Pioneers' migration west, his role in the early California Gold Rush, his association with the Lost Rhoades Mine, and as one of the first settlers of Oakley, Utah.

== Early life and family ==
Rhoads was born in Muhlenberg County, Kentucky, on July 13, 1796. He served in the War of 1812, then settled in Edgar County, Illinois in 1820, where he worked as a surveyor and road builder. Rhoads married Elizabeth Forster in 1817, with whom he had twenty children, including multiple sets of twins. After Elizabeth's death in California in 1847, he entered into plural marriages as practiced by some early Latter-day Saints, fathering a total of thirty-six children.

== Conversion to Mormonism ==
Rhoads encountered members of Zion's Camp, a Mormon expedition led by Joseph Smith, in 1834 and was baptized into the LDS Church in 1835. He moved to Ray County, Missouri, where he acquired land and was ordained an elder in the church in December 1837.

== Migration West ==
=== The 1846 Journey ===
In May 1846, Rhoads led a family group with 12 wagons from St. Joseph, Missouri across the Missouri River, joining other westbound parties such as the Donner-Reed Party and the company led by former Missouri Governor Lilburn W. Boggs. Rhoads was responsible for scouting routes and helping lead the train to California, arriving before the ill-fated Donner Party, which suffered severe losses in the Sierra Nevada.

=== Life in California ===
Upon arrival, Rhoads worked at Sutter's Fort during the California Gold Rush. After the death of his wife Elizabeth, he continued his westward work and was later involved in transporting gold back to the Utah Territory to support the church's economy, specifically the Deseret Mint.

=== Return to Utah ===
In 1849, Rhoads led a company of nearly fifty people from Sacramento to the Salt Lake Valley, returning with gold to aid the LDS Church's finances. In 1853, he became the first white man to winter in the valley that would become Oakley, Utah, where he is commemorated by a local monument.

== The Lost Rhoades Mine ==
Rhoads is closely associated with the Lost Rhoades Mine legend. In 1852, Brigham Young reportedly commissioned Rhoads to retrieve gold from mines whose location was shared with him by Ute leaders, particularly Chief Walkara, under the promise that it would only benefit the church. Rhoads made multiple secret trips into the Uinta Mountains, and stories of lost Spanish mines and treasure have surrounded his name ever since, though the mine's existence remains unproven.

== Chicken Creek Massacre ==
Brigham Young sent Thomas as a Lieutenant of the Mormon Battalion to investigate the reported massacre of Spanish Miners by the Ute Indians at Chicken Creek (Levan, UT). Maps of mines in the Uintahs were discovered in the saddle bags. Although, it's not known whether Thomas had mined any of these mines. It's accepted that his Son, Caleb B. Rhoades did throughout his life.

== Later life and death ==
By the 1860s, Rhoads moved with two of his wives to the Minersville area west of Beaver, Utah, a region known for early mining development. He may have also worked to establish Mormon mining claims in the Pahranagat Valley, just west of the Utah-Nevada border. Rhoads also served as a missionary among the Yaqui people along the Colorado River.

Thomas Rhoads died on February 20, 1869, in Minersville, Beaver County, Utah. His obituary was never published, likely due to LDS Church concerns over publicity surrounding mining activities at the time.

== Legacy ==
Rhoads's story remains a part of Utah pioneer folklore, especially due to the ongoing legend of the Lost Rhoades Mine. A monument in Oakley, Utah, commemorates his role in the settlement of the area.

== See also ==
- Mormon pioneers
- Donner Party
- California Gold Rush
- Lost Rhoades Mine
