= Clark E. Bronson =

American sculptor (born 1939)

- Born: 1939 (age 86–87); Kamas, Utah, U.S.
- Education: University of Utah
- Occupation: Sculptor

Clark E. Bronson (born 1939) is an American sculptor.

== Biography ==
Bronson was born in Kamas, Utah, in 1939. He attended the University of Utah, where he studied under Arnold Friberg. In 1960, he started working for the Utah Fish and Game Department, illustrating wildlife and big game. In about 1970, he abandoned painting for sculpting. Later in the 1990s, he began making films of wildlife.

== Collections ==
- Springville Museum of Art - The Big Boys, bronze, 1984
- Fairview Museum of History & Art

== Awards ==
- 1974 - Silver Medal, Prix de West Award, National Cowboy & Western Heritage Museum
- 1975 - Silver Medal, Prix de West Award, National Cowboy & Western Heritage Museum
- 1977 - Silver Medal, Prix de West Award, National Cowboy & Western Heritage Museum
