= Jordanelle, Utah =

Coordinates: 40°36′30″N 111°24′40″W

Location of the former community of Jordanelle within the State of Utah

Jordanelle was a community in northern Wasatch County, Utah, United States.

== Description ==
Jordanelle was located along the former routing of US-40 and US-189, south of the former town of Hailstone and north of Heber City, in the approximate current site of the Jordanelle Dam. Almost all of the former town was submerged in 1995 by the waters of Jordanelle Reservoir, along with Hailstone and Keetley. About the only remains of the former community is an RV park.

== See also ==
- List of ghost towns in Utah
