= Kamas, Utah =

- City
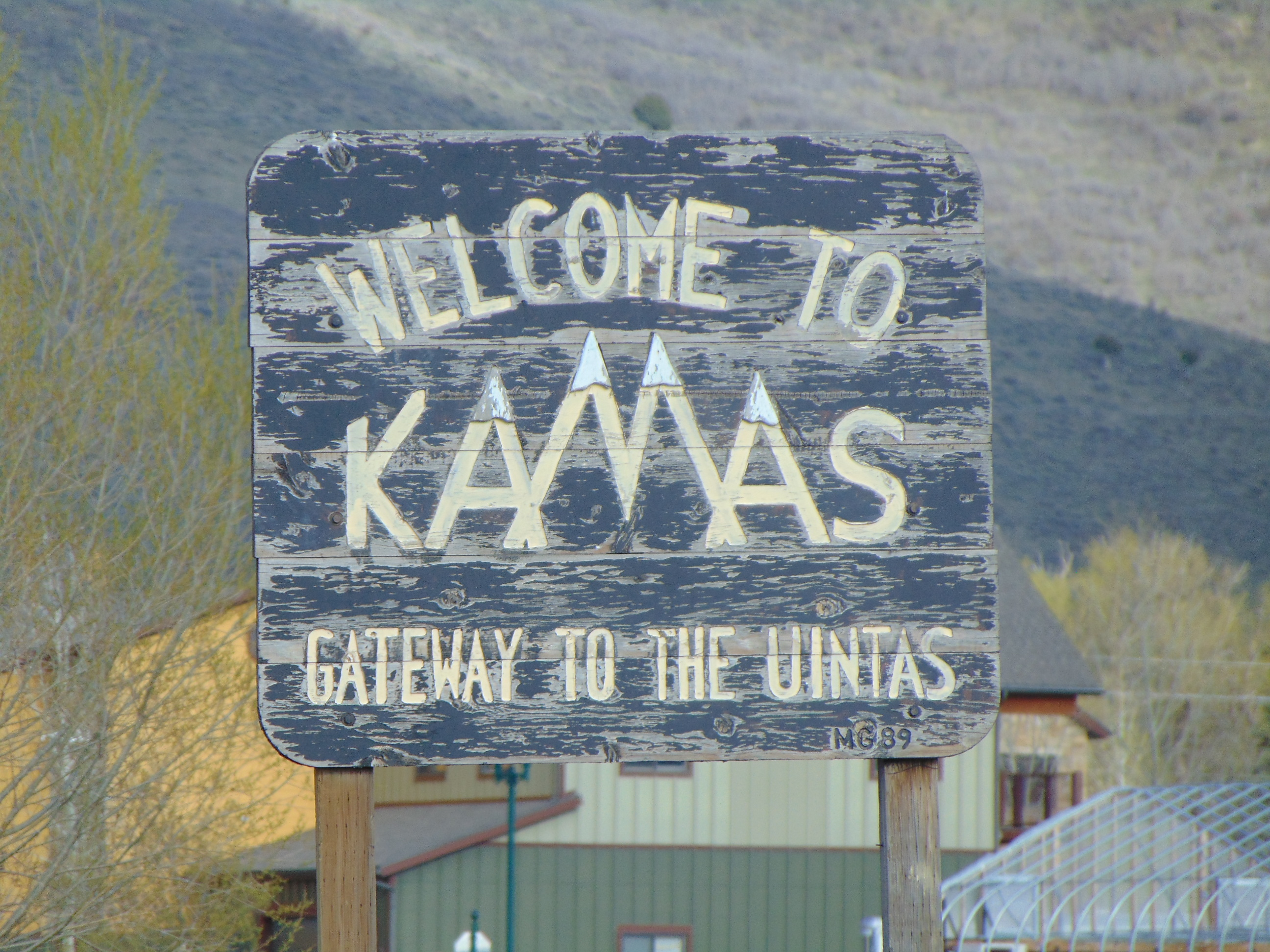

- Location in Summit County and the state of Utah
- Coordinates: 40°39′12″N 111°15′39″W
- Country: United States
- State: Utah
- County: Summit
- Settled: 1859
- Named for: Camassia quamash

Area
  - Total: 3.90 sq mi (10.10 km^{2})
  - Land: 3.90 sq mi (10.10 km^{2})
  - Water: 0 sq mi (0.00 km^{2})
- Elevation: 6,690 ft (2,040 m)

Population (2020)
  - Total: 2,092
  - Density: 568.0/sq mi (219.29/km^{2})
- Time zone: UTC-7 (Mountain (MST))
  - Summer (DST): UTC-6 (MDT)
- ZIP code: 84036
- Area code: 435
- FIPS code: 49-39810
- GNIS feature ID: 2410162
- Website: kamascityut.gov

Kamas (/ˈkæməs/ KAM-əs) is a city in southwestern Summit County, Utah, United States. The population was 2,092 at the 2020 census. It is 42 miles (68 km) east of downtown Salt Lake City. Its main industries are cattle ranching and lumber. The town is known as "The Gateway to the Uinta Mountains".

== History ==
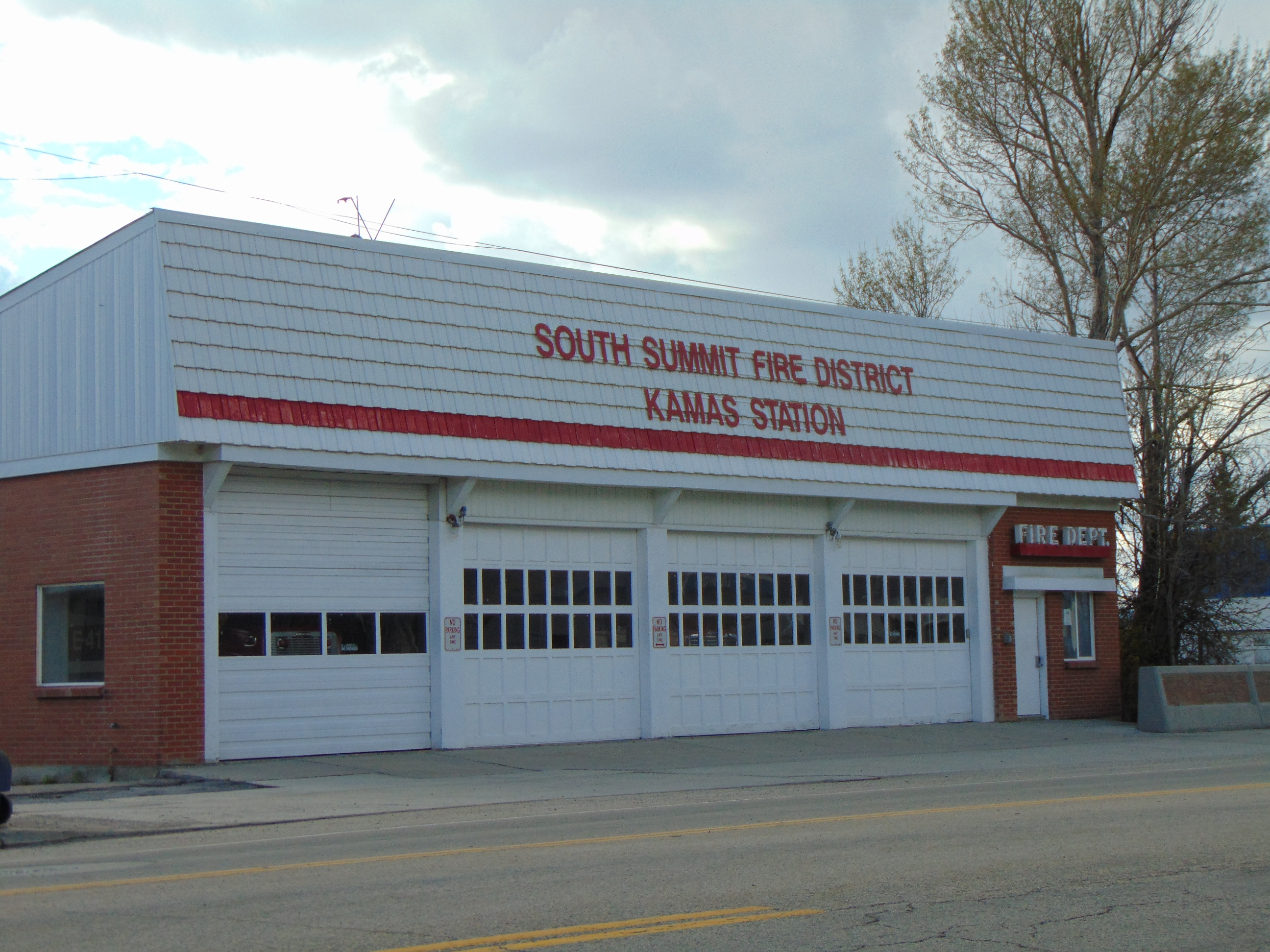
South Summit Fire District Kamas Station in Kamas (2016)

Kamas derives its name from Camassia quamash, a flowering plant that grows in the region and was a source of food for Native Americans.

Kamas was inhabited intermittently by several Native American ethnic groups, including members of the Ute, Shoshone, and Snake tribes. The first permanent settlements in the valley are believed to have been built by Mormon pioneers, including Abraham Marchant, John Lambert, and John Pack, who settled under the direction of Brigham Young.

One prominent figure in Kamas folklore history is Thomas Rhoads. According to legend, guides from a local Ute Tribe revealed to Rhoads the location of a gold mine from which he was allowed to take gold to assist in the construction of the Salt Lake Temple. The only condition the Ute guides gave for revealing the mine's location was that Rhoads not reveal it to anyone else. He adhered to the terms of this agreement until his death. Historical records cited by professor Leonard Arrington indicate the Rhoads family did in fact supply substantial amounts of gold to the LDS Church who built the temple, but Arrington also approaches the topic with caution and does not necessarily support the idea of a gold mine in Utah due to limited evidence. However, the "Rhoads Mine" is now considered lost, but its legend survives in several books on the topic.

== Geography ==
According to the United States Census Bureau, the city has an area of 1.6 square miles (4.1 km^{2}), all land.

=== Climate ===
According to the Köppen Climate Classification system, Kamas has a warm-summer humid continental climate, abbreviated "Dfb" on climate maps. The hottest temperature recorded in Kamas is 101 °F (38.3 °C), on July 13, 2002, and the coldest is −31 °F (−35.0 °C), on December 21, 1990.

Climate data for Kamas, Utah, 1991–2020 normals, extremes 1949–present
Month	Jan	Feb	Mar	Apr	May	Jun	Jul	Aug	Sep	Oct	Nov	Dec	Year
Record high °F (°C)	59 (15)	62 (17)	76 (24)	84 (29)	92 (33)	97 (36)	101 (38)	98 (37)	95 (35)	85 (29)	75 (24)	62 (17)	101 (38)
Mean maximum °F (°C)	50.0 (10.0)	53.2 (11.8)	63.6 (17.6)	73.3 (22.9)	81.7 (27.6)	88.9 (31.6)	93.8 (34.3)	92.3 (33.5)	86.6 (30.3)	76.6 (24.8)	63.6 (17.6)	52.0 (11.1)	94.7 (34.8)
Mean daily maximum °F (°C)	34.8 (1.6)	38.2 (3.4)	47.2 (8.4)	55.4 (13.0)	65.3 (18.5)	76.2 (24.6)	84.5 (29.2)	82.9 (28.3)	73.6 (23.1)	59.2 (15.1)	44.7 (7.1)	34.4 (1.3)	58.0 (14.5)
Daily mean °F (°C)	25.0 (−3.9)	27.8 (−2.3)	35.9 (2.2)	42.6 (5.9)	50.8 (10.4)	59.4 (15.2)	67.1 (19.5)	65.8 (18.8)	57.2 (14.0)	45.2 (7.3)	33.7 (0.9)	25.0 (−3.9)	44.6 (7.0)
Mean daily minimum °F (°C)	15.2 (−9.3)	17.4 (−8.1)	24.7 (−4.1)	29.8 (−1.2)	36.3 (2.4)	42.7 (5.9)	49.8 (9.9)	48.7 (9.3)	40.7 (4.8)	31.2 (−0.4)	22.8 (−5.1)	15.6 (−9.1)	31.2 (−0.4)
Mean minimum °F (°C)	−6.6 (−21.4)	−3.3 (−19.6)	6.3 (−14.3)	15.4 (−9.2)	23.5 (−4.7)	30.6 (−0.8)	38.9 (3.8)	37.5 (3.1)	26.2 (−3.2)	14.9 (−9.5)	2.0 (−16.7)	−5.8 (−21.0)	−10.8 (−23.8)
Record low °F (°C)	−26 (−32)	−30 (−34)	−11 (−24)	4 (−16)	13 (−11)	22 (−6)	29 (−2)	24 (−4)	16 (−9)	−5 (−21)	−18 (−28)	−31 (−35)	−31 (−35)
Average precipitation inches (mm)	1.79 (45)	1.34 (34)	1.46 (37)	1.55 (39)	1.66 (42)	0.95 (24)	0.82 (21)	1.08 (27)	1.52 (39)	1.60 (41)	1.38 (35)	1.49 (38)	16.64 (422)
Average snowfall inches (cm)	22.1 (56)	17.9 (45)	12.3 (31)	7.4 (19)	2.2 (5.6)	0.3 (0.76)	0.0 (0.0)	0.0 (0.0)	0.5 (1.3)	2.3 (5.8)	13.4 (34)	18.5 (47)	96.9 (245.46)
Average extreme snow depth inches (cm)	15.8 (40)	15.8 (40)	10.0 (25)	2.1 (5.3)	0.3 (0.76)	0.0 (0.0)	0.0 (0.0)	0.0 (0.0)	0.3 (0.76)	1.4 (3.6)	6.3 (16)	9.8 (25)	17.5 (44)
Average precipitation days (≥ 0.01 in)	9.6	8.6	8.5	8.9	8.3	5.2	5.3	6.0	6.2	7.5	7.3	7.9	89.3
Average snowy days (≥ 0.1 in)	8.7	7.5	4.8	3.7	0.9	0.0	0.0	0.0	0.1	1.1	4.5	7.2	38.5
Source 1: NOAA
Source 2: National Weather Service

== Demographics ==
Historical population
Census	Pop.	Note	%±
1900	440		—
1910	418		−5.0%
1920	563		34.7%
1930	558		−0.9%
1940	729		30.6%
1950	721		−1.1%
1960	749		3.9%
1970	806		7.6%
1980	1,064		32.0%
1990	1,061		−0.3%
2000	1,274		20.1%
2010	1,811		42.2%
2020	2,092		15.5%
U.S. Decennial Census

Kamas is part of the Salt Lake City, Utah Metropolitan Statistical Area.

=== 2020 census ===
As of the 2020 census, Kamas had a population of 2,092. The median age was 35.2 years. 28.4% of residents were under the age of 18 and 11.2% of residents were 65 years of age or older. For every 100 females there were 105.9 males, and for every 100 females age 18 and over there were 102.3 males age 18 and over.

0.0% of residents lived in urban areas, while 100.0% lived in rural areas.

There were 713 households in Kamas, of which 43.5% had children under the age of 18 living in them. Of all households, 58.8% were married-couple households, 15.4% were households with a male householder and no spouse or partner present, and 19.9% were households with a female householder and no spouse or partner present. About 18.1% of all households were made up of individuals and 8.2% had someone living alone who was 65 years of age or older.

There were 764 housing units, of which 6.7% were vacant. The homeowner vacancy rate was 1.9% and the rental vacancy rate was 2.8%.

Racial composition as of the 2020 census
Race	Number	Percent
White	1,666	79.6%
Black or African American	4	0.2%
American Indian and Alaska Native	13	0.6%
Asian	9	0.4%
Native Hawaiian and Other Pacific Islander	3	0.1%
Some other race	260	12.4%
Two or more races	137	6.5%
Hispanic or Latino (of any race)	401	19.2%

=== 2000 census ===
As of the 2000 census, there were 1,274 people, 445 households, and 327 families residing in the city. The population density was 796.3 people per square mile (307.4/km^{2}). There were 482 housing units at an average density of 303.4 per square mile (117.1/km^{2}). The racial makeup of the city was 96.31% White, 0.39% African American, 0.16% Native American, 0.31% Asian, 0.08% Pacific Islander, 2.04% from other races, and 0.71% from two or more races. Hispanic or Latino of any race were 5.89% of the population.

There were 445 households, out of which 41.8% had children under the age of 18 living with them, 58.2% were married couples living together, 11.5% had a female householder with no husband present, and 26.5% were non-families. 21.1% of all households were made up of individuals, and 8.3% had someone living alone who was 65 years of age or older. The average household size was 2.86 and the average family size was 3.37.

In the city, the population was spread out, with 33.0% under the age of 18, 9.6% from 18 to 24, 29.9% from 25 to 44, 18.4% from 45 to 64, and 9.1% who were 65 years of age or older. The median age was 30 years. For every 100 females, there were 99.1 males. For every 100 females age 18 and over, there were 95.0 males.

The median income for a household in the city was $41,667, and the median income for a family was $46,750. Males had a median income of $30,703 versus $22,434 for females. The per capita income for the city was $16,761. About 3.6% of families and 7.3% of the population were below the poverty line, including 7.1% of those under age 18 and 4.5% of those age 65 or over.

=== Religion ===
The predominant religion of the area, as with most rural towns of Utah, is the Church of Jesus Christ of Latter-day Saints. Further, the Kamas Bible Church is also located in Kamas. There is also a small Catholic minority, many of whom attend church either in Heber City or Park City.

== Education ==
Kamas is in the South Summit School District. It is home to the South Summit school district's facilities, and has a high school, a middle school, and an elementary school (all called South Summit). Nearby towns Peoa, Oakley, Marion, Francis, and Woodland all send students to these schools. Students in nearby Weber Canyon and Mirror Lake Canyon also reside in the school district.

== Events ==
Kamas is the starting point for the High Uintas Classic, a two-day bicycle race that takes place every summer, usually in mid-June. The race features a mountain stage that takes participants on the Mirror Lake Highway from downtown Kamas over Bald Mountain Pass and into Evanston, Wyoming. Part of the route for the final two stages of the 2012 Tour of Utah cycling race went through downtown Kamas. The Tour of Utah returned in 2013 and cyclists went through Kamas again during the sixth and final stage.

Kamas hosts Fiesta Days, a community celebration on and around July 24, Utah's Pioneer Day holiday. Fiesta Days includes rodeos, a demolition derby, a parade, and the Miss Fiesta Days beauty/scholarship pageant.

Kamas hosts the High Country Classic wrestling tournament every January.

== Transportation ==
High Valley Transit provides service to Kamas on the 102 to Park City, with three round trips in the morning and three in the afternoon.

== Notable people ==
- Clark E. Bronson (b. 1939) - sculptor
- Steve Schmidt (b. 1970) - political and corporate strategist
- Hannah Neeleman - social media personality

== See also ==
- List of cities and towns in Utah
- High Uintas Wilderness
