= Keetley, Utah =

Ghost town in Wasatch County, Utah, United States

Coordinates: 40°38′08″N 111°24′53″W

Location of Keetley within Utah

Keetley is a ghost town located in northeastern Wasatch County, Utah, United States.

== Description ==
The town was located along the former routing of U.S. Route 40 (US‑40), north of the former town of Hailstone and east of Keetley Station. (Keetley Junction was further north along US‑40, at its junction with Utah State Route 248.)

== History ==
The town began as a mining community, with a spur of the Union Pacific Railroad increasing the economic interest in the community for a short time. The village was submerged by the waters of Jordanelle Reservoir in 1995 along with Hailstone and Jordanelle.

The town began as a mining camp. Its first name was Camp Florence, for the first "lady" to visit the camp. It became a Pony Express station and a center for the area's mining and lumber industries. As it grew into a town, it was renamed for Jack Keetley, a Pony Express rider and local mining supervisor.

=== Keetley Agricultural Colony ===
During World War II Keetley was used as a 'voluntary' relocation camp for many Japanese-Americans. Fred Isamu Wada approached the mayor of Keetley, George Fisher, with the idea of leasing the land with the promise of bringing Japanese farm labor. While initial reaction was unfavorable, the fears were quickly allayed as it was shown that those relocating were not going to be a burden on the locals.

A large, 150-acre (61 ha) farm was established after much intense labor to clear the land of the ubiquitous rocks. While the women and children tended to chickens, pigs, and goats, the men went to work farming sugar beets.

The settlement lasted until the end of World War II when two-thirds returned to their homes in California and the rest scattered to other communities in Utah.

=== Modern development ===
Because of its proximity to Park City and the Jordanelle Reservoir, while the site of Keetley itself (along with the former towns of Hailstone and Jordanelle) is now completely submerged by the reservoir, the surrounding area is today the site of new construction, bringing in large resort-style home developments such as Hideout Canyon, Todd Hollow and Deer Mountain. In 2008 the town of Hideout was incorporated in this area.

== See also ==
- List of ghost towns in Utah
