= Myton Presbyterian Church =

Historic church in Utah, United States

- U.S. National Register of Historic Places
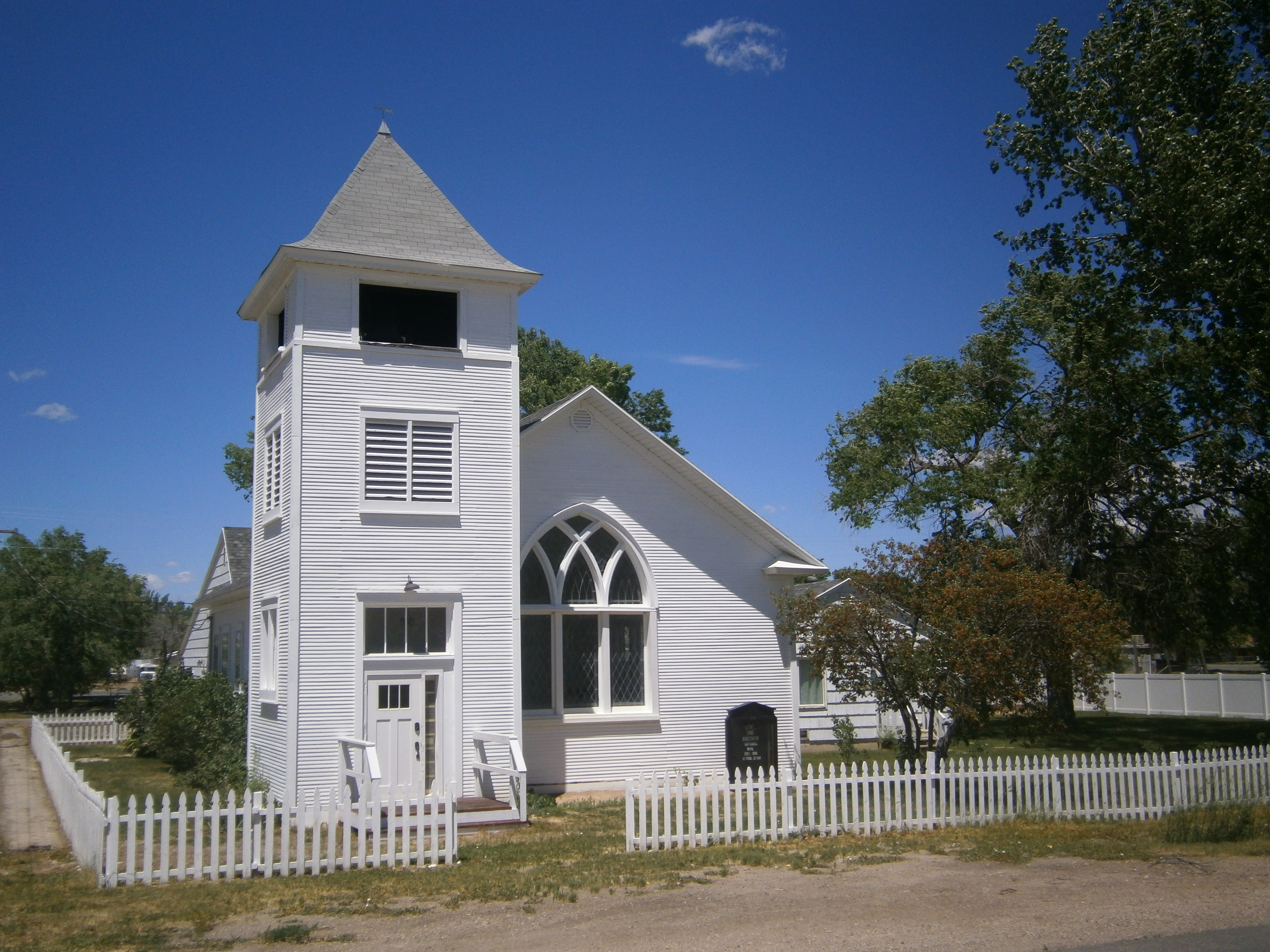

- Location within Utah Location within the United States
- Location: 225 E. 100 S., Myton, Utah
- Coordinates: 40°11′36″N 110°03′35″W
- NRHP reference No.: 100001638
- Added to NRHP: September 18, 2017

The Myton Presbyterian Church, in Myton, Utah, was built in 1915 and served as a church until 2015. It was listed on the National Register of Historic Places in 2017.

According to Utah State preservation specialist Mardita Murphy, it is "the oldest surviving building in Duschesne County".

After the church was closed it was put up for sale, and journalist Reed Cowan purchased it intending to use it as a second home. However he came to understand the local community importance of the church and chose to keep it open to the public instead.

It is open for use for weddings and other events.
