= Simmons Ranch =

- Formerly listed on the U.S. National Register of Historic Places
- U.S. Historic district
- Nearest city: Fruitland, Utah
- Area: 10 acres (4.0 ha)
- Built: 1913
- Built by: Simmons, Charles
- Architectural style: Log cabin
- NRHP reference No.: 92000463

Significant dates
- Added to NRHP: August 18, 1992
- Removed from NRHP: June 21, 2024

The Simmons Ranch near Fruitland, Utah dates from 1913. It has also been known as Remund Ranch. It was listed on the National Register of Historic Places in 1992, and was delisted in 2024. The listing included four log cabin-style contributing buildings and four other contributing structures.

The ranch is within a canyon of the Strawberry River. It was deemed significant as the oldest surviving homestead—and unusual as a successful one—in this area of Duchesne County, Utah, out of "European/American" settlers. Ownership for the property was filed in 1913, after the area, formerly part of the Uintah Reservation of the Ute tribe, was opened for non-Indian settlers. Charles Simmons did not finalize the patent until 1928 however.
