= Indian Canyon Ranger Station =

- U.S. National Register of Historic Places
- Location within Utah Location within the United States
- Location: Off Utah State Route 33
- Nearest city: Duchesne, Utah
- Coordinates: 39°55′37″N 110°40′34″W
- Area: 1 acre (0.40 ha)
- Built: 1914
- Built by: U.S. Forest Service
- Architectural style: Wood framed guard station
- NRHP reference No.: 99001294
- Added to NRHP: October 28, 1999

The Indian Canyon Ranger Station in the Duchesne Ranger District, Ashley National Forest in Duchesne County, Utah near Duchesne was built in 1914. It was a work of the U.S. Forest Service and is a wood-framed guard station. It was listed on the National Register of Historic Places (NRHP) in 1999; the listing included two contributing buildings and two contributing structures.

It was deemed significant as "an extant reminder of the early days of the Forest Service in Utah", when rangers were needed to monitor the remote lands. The station is the oldest surviving from the original Uinta National Forest (which included its area until 1954), and one of the oldest surviving in the Ashley National Forest that was "built specifically by the Forest Service to house a ranger."

It was built before standardized architectural plans were developed for U.S. Forest Service buildings, and is "unique in its architecture, with no other similar Forest Service buildings existing in Northern Utah."

== See also ==
- Stockmore Ranger Station, also NRHP-listed in 1999 in Duchesne County
