= Woodland, Utah =

- CDP
- Location in Summit County and the state of Utah

- Location in Utah Location in the United States
- Coordinates: 40°35′12″N 111°14′50″W
- Country: United States
- State: Utah
- County: Summit
- Settled: 1874
- Founder: Hans Larsen

Area
  - Total: 2.3 sq mi (6.0 km^{2})
  - Land: 2.3 sq mi (6.0 km^{2})
  - Water: 0 sq mi (0.0 km^{2})
- Elevation: 6,749 ft (2,057 m)

Population (2020)
  - Total: 375
  - Density: 160/sq mi (62/km^{2})
- Time zone: UTC-7 (Mountain (MST))
  - Summer (DST): UTC-6 (MDT)
- ZIP code: 84036
- Area code: 435
- FIPS code: 49-85040
- GNIS feature ID: 2409623

Woodland is a census-designated place (CDP) in Summit County, Utah, United States. The population was 335 at the 2000 census and 375 at 2020 census.

Woodland was first settled along the Provo River by Hans Larsen(1861). In 1864, Larsen donated a portion of land to the LDS Church in order to build a meeting house, which he would construct. Larsen chose the name Woodland in recognition of the large timbers and railroad ties harvested from the area. Woodland was officially recognized as a Utah Territory settlement in 1867.

Since 2000, there has been attempts to incorporate the CDP. When the proposal to incorporate as its own town stalled, there was another proposal for the CDP to be at least partially annexed into the neighboring town of Francis.

== Geography ==
According to the United States Census Bureau, the CDP has a total area of 2.3 square miles (6.0 km^{2}), all land. The town is at the southernmost point of the Kamas Valley. Much of the town is dominated by the Provo River's natural floodplain. However, a levee keeps most of the river from reaching its northern branches. The Provo River has steep, prominent benches as it passes through Woodland.

== Demographics ==
Historical population
Census	Pop.	Note	%±
1890	348		—
1900	461		32.5%
1910	127		−72.5%
1920	164		29.1%
1930	193		17.7%
1940	235		21.8%
1950	200		−14.9%
2000	335		—
2010	343		2.4%
2020	375		9.3%
Source: U.S. Census Bureau

As of the census of 2000, there were 335 people, 98 households, and 83 families residing in the CDP. The population density was 144.0 people per square mile (55.6/km^{2}). There were 115 housing units at an average density of 49.4/sq mi (19.1/km^{2}). The racial makeup of the CDP was 98.51% White, and 1.49% from two or more races. Hispanic or Latino of any race were 3.28% of the population.

There were 98 households, out of which 51.0% had children under the age of 18 living with them, 73.5% were married couples living together, 7.1% had a female householder with no husband present, and 15.3% were non-families. 11.2% of all households were made up of individuals, and 5.1% had someone living alone who was 65 years of age or older. The average household size was 3.42 and the average family size was 3.75.

In the CDP, the population was spread out, with 37.0% under the age of 18, 8.4% from 18 to 24, 23.6% from 25 to 44, 24.8% from 45 to 64, and 6.3% who were 65 years of age or older. The median age was 32 years. For every 100 females, there were 97.1 males. For every 100 females age 18 and over, there were 104.9 males.

The median income for a household in the CDP was $53,750, and the median income for a family was $54,000. Males had a median income of $36,250 versus $30,000 for females. The per capita income for the CDP was $25,392. None of the families and 1.0% of the population were living below the poverty line, including no under eighteens and none of those over 64.

== Education ==
It is in the South Summit School District.

== See also ==
- List of census-designated places in Utah
