= Wanship, Utah =

Wanship
- CDP
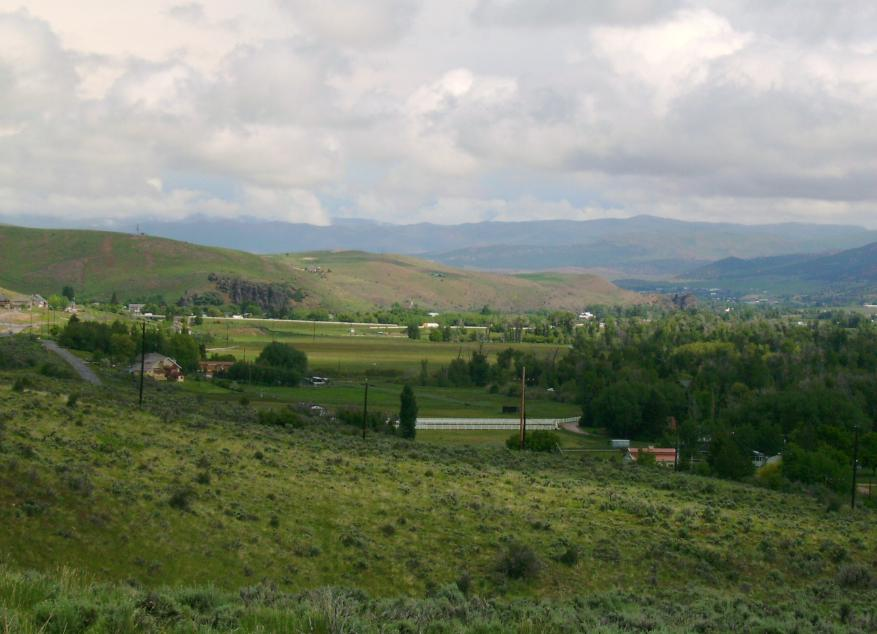
- View of Wanship, Utah, from Wanship Dam

- Location in Summit County and the state of Utah
- Coordinates: 40°49′00″N 111°24′54″W
- Country: United States
- State: Utah
- County: Summit
- Settled: 1859
- Founder: Stephen Nixon and Henry Roper
- Named for: Chief Wanship
- Elevation: 6,093 ft (1,857 m)

Population (2020)
  - Total: 423
- Time zone: UTC-7 (Mountain (MST))
  - Summer (DST): UTC-6 (MDT)
- ZIP code: 84017
- Area code: 435
- GNIS feature ID: 2584781

Wanship (/ˈwɑːnʃɪp/ WAHN-ship) is a census-designated place in Summit County, Utah, United States. The population was 423 at the 2020 census.

== History ==
Wanship was founded in 1859 by Stephen Nixon and Henry Roper, who were joined by other settlers over the next two years. In 1861, 300 Native Americans settled in the area. The sudden population increase made attempting to gather food in the area difficult. A friendly Ute, Chief Wanship, helped the non-native settlers to find game, locate edible plants, and trade with the Indians. In return, the town was named for him. Farming in the area included rye, barley, wheat, and alfalfa. The town also served as a local commodity hub, as coal from Coalville, silver from Park City, and lumber from Kamas passed through. In 1862 an overland stage stop, called the Kimballs Stage Station, opened in Wanship. Due to its central location, Wanship became the first county seat of Summit County, from the formation of the county government in 1866 until Coalville became county seat in 1872.

The first two-story home built by Thomas Albert Smith, in Summit County was built in Wanship, and has since been relocated to Pioneer Village in Lagoon Amusement Park.

== Wanship today ==
Today, Wanship exists as a small, unincorporated community. There is one currently operating business: a Sinclair filling station adjacent to the Northbound I-80 Wanship exit. There was also a (now defunct) museum in an old barn that contained a collection of antique carriages and other western memorabilia, which was destroyed during a fire in 2023. The Wanship Dam, creating the Rockport Reservoir, was built south of the town in the mid-1950s.

== Geography ==
Wanship is located at the intersection of Interstate 80 and Utah State Route 32, at the junction of Silver Creek and the Weber River. It is 37 miles (60 km) from Salt Lake City, and 8 miles (13 km) from Coalville.

=== Climate ===
Climate data for Wanship Dam, Utah, 1991–2020 normals, 1955-2020 extremes: 5940ft (1811m)
Month	Jan	Feb	Mar	Apr	May	Jun	Jul	Aug	Sep	Oct	Nov	Dec	Year
Record high °F (°C)	59 (15)	66 (19)	78 (26)	85 (29)	94 (34)	99 (37)	101 (38)	99 (37)	94 (34)	87 (31)	72 (22)	65 (18)	101 (38)
Mean maximum °F (°C)	49.1 (9.5)	53.2 (11.8)	65.3 (18.5)	74.9 (23.8)	82.9 (28.3)	91.0 (32.8)	96.1 (35.6)	94.0 (34.4)	89.0 (31.7)	78.9 (26.1)	65.0 (18.3)	52.5 (11.4)	96.4 (35.8)
Mean daily maximum °F (°C)	35.4 (1.9)	39.3 (4.1)	49.1 (9.5)	57.1 (13.9)	67.2 (19.6)	78.6 (25.9)	87.4 (30.8)	85.6 (29.8)	76.4 (24.7)	62.1 (16.7)	46.9 (8.3)	35.5 (1.9)	60.0 (15.6)
Daily mean °F (°C)	24.2 (−4.3)	27.8 (−2.3)	36.6 (2.6)	43.5 (6.4)	51.7 (10.9)	60.4 (15.8)	68.3 (20.2)	66.6 (19.2)	58.1 (14.5)	46.2 (7.9)	34.3 (1.3)	24.9 (−3.9)	45.2 (7.4)
Mean daily minimum °F (°C)	13.0 (−10.6)	16.4 (−8.7)	24.2 (−4.3)	29.9 (−1.2)	36.3 (2.4)	42.3 (5.7)	49.2 (9.6)	47.7 (8.7)	39.8 (4.3)	30.3 (−0.9)	21.7 (−5.7)	14.3 (−9.8)	30.4 (−0.9)
Mean minimum °F (°C)	−9.0 (−22.8)	−5.8 (−21.0)	6.3 (−14.3)	15.8 (−9.0)	22.7 (−5.2)	30.1 (−1.1)	37.6 (3.1)	36.1 (2.3)	25.4 (−3.7)	14.8 (−9.6)	1.6 (−16.9)	−6.3 (−21.3)	−14.4 (−25.8)
Record low °F (°C)	−35 (−37)	−37 (−38)	−25 (−32)	1 (−17)	15 (−9)	21 (−6)	26 (−3)	22 (−6)	12 (−11)	−7 (−22)	−16 (−27)	−28 (−33)	−37 (−38)
Average precipitation inches (mm)	1.21 (31)	1.09 (28)	1.41 (36)	1.93 (49)	2.01 (51)	1.05 (27)	0.86 (22)	1.08 (27)	1.50 (38)	1.63 (41)	1.35 (34)	1.24 (31)	16.36 (415)
Average snowfall inches (cm)	14.90 (37.8)	13.10 (33.3)	10.00 (25.4)	6.20 (15.7)	1.10 (2.8)	0.10 (0.25)	0.00 (0.00)	0.00 (0.00)	0.30 (0.76)	2.70 (6.9)	10.50 (26.7)	13.30 (33.8)	72.2 (183.41)
Source 1: NOAA
Source 2: XMACIS2 (records & monthly max/mins)

== Demographics ==
Historical population
Census	Pop.	Note	%±
2010	400		—
2020	423		5.8%

As of the census of 2010, there were 400 people living in the CDP. There were 164 housing units. The racial makeup of the town was 91.5% White, 0.3% American Indian and Alaska Native, 6.0% from some other race, and 2.3% from two or more races. Hispanic or Latino of any race were 8.8% of the population.

== Education ==
It is in the North Summit School District.

== See also ==
- List of census-designated places in Utah
