= Lost Rhoades Mine =

Legendary 19th-century gold mine in the Uinta Mountains

The Lost Rhoads Mine (also spelled Rhoades) is a legendary gold mine believed to be located in the Uinta Mountains of Utah. The accounts are a central element of Mormon folklore, involving 19th-century pioneers, leaders of the Church of Jesus Christ of Latter-day Saints (LDS Church), and the Ute people. Records cited by historian Leonard Arrington confirm the Rhoads family provided substantial quantities of gold to the LDS Church during the mid-19th century, but Arrington also stress this does not necessarily support claims the gold was mined in Utah.

== Historical background ==
The legend centers on Thomas Rhoads (1794–1869), a Kentucky convert to the LDS Church who worked at Sutter's Mill during the California Gold Rush before returning to the Salt Lake Valley in 1849. On July 13, 1852, records from the Deseret Mint document that Rhoads deposited gold dust valued at $3,414, equivalent to 165.17 ounces, or approximately $445,959 in 2026 gold value. While some historians argue this gold was accumulated in California, contemporary accounts by associates suggested Rhoads was making frequent, short trips into the nearby mountains to retrieve ore.

== The Caleb Rhoades era ==
Following Thomas Rhoads's death in 1869, his son Caleb Rhoades (1836–1905) reportedly continued the expeditions. According to oral tradition, the mine was the subject of a secret treaty between Brigham Young and Ute leaders, including Chief Walkara or Chief Tabby-To-Kwanah. This agreement allegedly permitted the family to mine gold on tribal lands provided it was used for the church's benefit. Caleb Rhoades became a well-known figure in the Uintah Basin, filing numerous mining claims in the 1870s and 1880s, though none officially reported gold yields. He is believed to have taken the location of the family's supposed gold source to his grave in 1905.

== Geography and geology ==
Treasure hunters have historically focused on the Rock Creek, Blind Stream, and Rhoades Canyon areas of the Uinta Mountains. However, the Utah Geological Survey notes that the Uinta range is primarily composed of Precambrian quartzite and sedimentary rock, which typically lack the igneous rock activity necessary for significant gold-bearing quartz veins.

== See also ==
- Lost mines
- Ute people
- Dream Mine
- Lost Josephine Mine
