= Pioneer Village (Utah) =

Museum in Farmington, Utah

Coordinates: 40°59′03″N 111°53′29″W

Pioneer Village is a themed section of Lagoon Amusement Park in Farmington, Utah. Intended to be a "living museum," Pioneer Village includes artifacts and mementos housed in over two dozen structures which illustrate the history of Utah. It was founded in 1938 near Salt Lake City by Horace and Ethel Sorensen. Lagoon bought the collection from the Sons of Utah Pioneers in April 1975, and it opened at the park in 1976.

Exhibits

Historic Rock Building, furniture exhibit with collection of antique furniture including a couch and chair made in 1860

Print shop

Shoe shop with cobbler tools and machines

Coop store

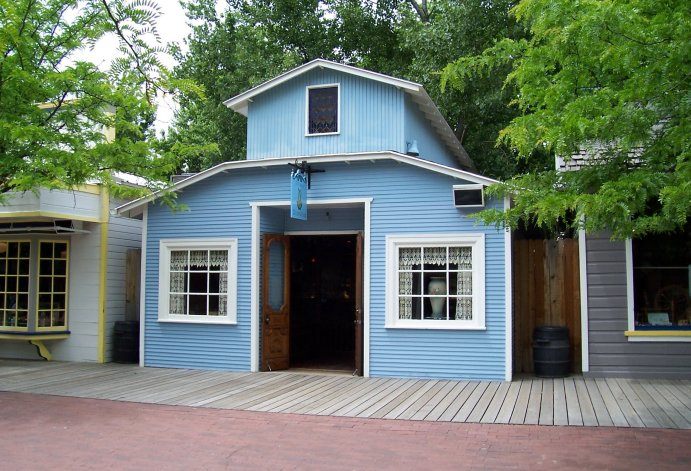
China shop with pieces made from the 1830s to the 1910s

Hardware museum

Pioneer stove

An original post office which operated from 1905 to 1955

Bakery with a soda fountain from 1855

Antique model train museum

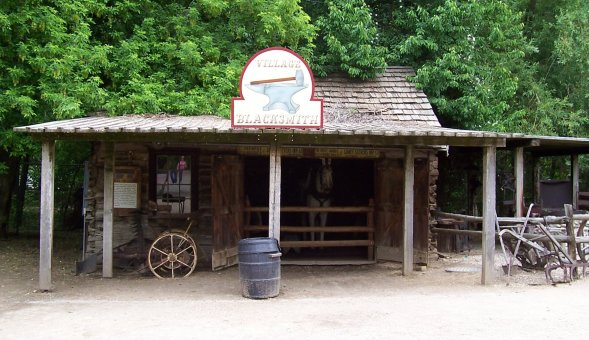
Blacksmith shop built in 1858 with original tools

Other exhibits include:

- A barber store from the 1890s
- Bigler Cabin, a cabin built by an early settler of Utah
- Erastus Bingham Cabin, a cabin constructed in 1853
- Gingerbread House, a house built in 1904
- A collection of antique firearms, including guns used in the American Revolution and American Civil War
- Little Rock Chapel, a building constructed in 1863 which has served as a fort, a courthouse, a schoolhouse, and a church
- Rockport Schoolhouse, dates back to 1870
- Wabship Cabin, a two-story home with many pioneer-era furniture pieces
- Carriage Hall, a museum featuring many antique carriages, including: a buckboard, a Berlin coach, a Victoria carriage, a Rockaway, a Brougham, a Studebaker light delivery wagon, the Peter Schuttler Wagon (heavy weight at 1600 pounds and could haul three tons), a Mormon handcart, and a Surrey sleigh.

== See also ==
- This Is the Place Heritage Park

== Sources ==
- Lagoon Corp.
