= Rockport Reservoir =

Reservoir in Summit County, Utah, United States

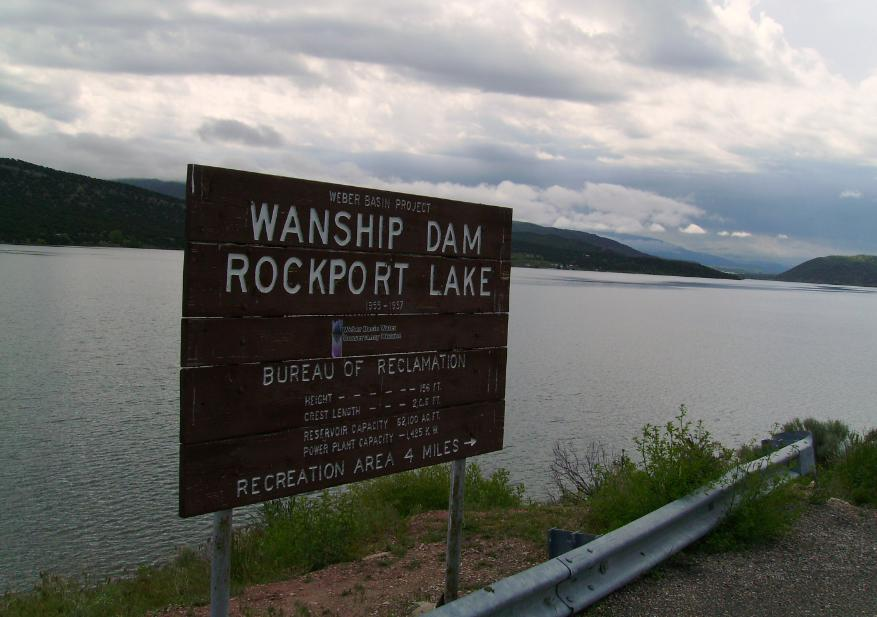
- Rockport Lake, June 2009

- Location within Utah Location within the United States
- Location: Summit County, Utah, United States
- Coordinates: 40°47′24″N 111°24′15″W
- Type: reservoir
- Primary inflows: Weber River
- Primary outflows: Weber River
- Basin countries: United States
- Surface area: 1,080 acres (440 ha)
- Water volume: 2.4 square miles (6.2 km^{2})
- Surface elevation: 5,955 feet (1,815 m)
- Website: Official website

Rockport Reservoir, also called Wanship Reservoir, is a reservoir along the Weber River within the Rockport State Park in southwestern Summit County, Utah, United States.

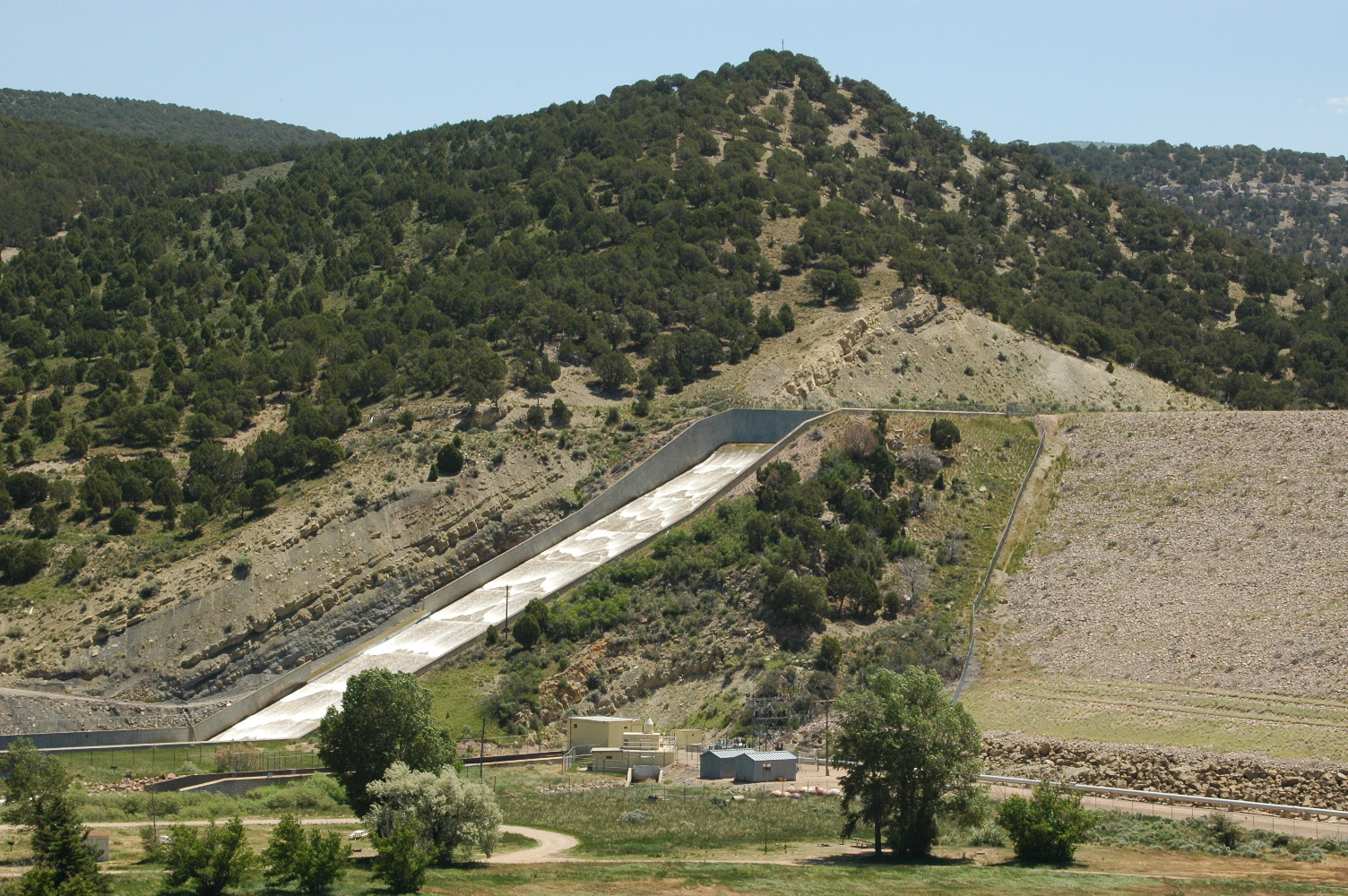
The Wanship Dam and spillway, June 2006

== Description ==
Rockport Reservoir is located just south of the town of Wanship on Utah State Route 32. It is an impoundment on the Weber River, created by the Wanship Dam.

The reservoir was named for the former town of Rockport, which it almost completely submerged in the 1950s.

== Wanship Dam ==
Wanship Dam is a 175 feet (53 m) high embankment dam. It has a crest length of 2,015 feet (614 m). It was built as part of the Weber Basin project between 1954 and 1957.

=== Climate ===
Climate data for Wanship Dam, Utah, 1991–2020 normals, 1955-2020 extremes: 5940ft (1811m)
Month	Jan	Feb	Mar	Apr	May	Jun	Jul	Aug	Sep	Oct	Nov	Dec	Year
Record high °F (°C)	59 (15)	66 (19)	78 (26)	85 (29)	94 (34)	99 (37)	101 (38)	99 (37)	94 (34)	87 (31)	72 (22)	65 (18)	101 (38)
Mean maximum °F (°C)	49.1 (9.5)	53.2 (11.8)	65.3 (18.5)	74.9 (23.8)	82.9 (28.3)	91.0 (32.8)	96.1 (35.6)	94.0 (34.4)	89.0 (31.7)	78.9 (26.1)	65.0 (18.3)	52.5 (11.4)	96.4 (35.8)
Mean daily maximum °F (°C)	35.4 (1.9)	39.3 (4.1)	49.1 (9.5)	57.1 (13.9)	67.2 (19.6)	78.6 (25.9)	87.4 (30.8)	85.6 (29.8)	76.4 (24.7)	62.1 (16.7)	46.9 (8.3)	35.5 (1.9)	60.0 (15.6)
Daily mean °F (°C)	24.2 (−4.3)	27.8 (−2.3)	36.6 (2.6)	43.5 (6.4)	51.7 (10.9)	60.4 (15.8)	68.3 (20.2)	66.6 (19.2)	58.1 (14.5)	46.2 (7.9)	34.3 (1.3)	24.9 (−3.9)	45.2 (7.4)
Mean daily minimum °F (°C)	13.0 (−10.6)	16.4 (−8.7)	24.2 (−4.3)	29.9 (−1.2)	36.3 (2.4)	42.3 (5.7)	49.2 (9.6)	47.7 (8.7)	39.8 (4.3)	30.3 (−0.9)	21.7 (−5.7)	14.3 (−9.8)	30.4 (−0.9)
Mean minimum °F (°C)	−9.0 (−22.8)	−5.8 (−21.0)	6.3 (−14.3)	15.8 (−9.0)	22.7 (−5.2)	30.1 (−1.1)	37.6 (3.1)	36.1 (2.3)	25.4 (−3.7)	14.8 (−9.6)	1.6 (−16.9)	−6.3 (−21.3)	−14.4 (−25.8)
Record low °F (°C)	−35 (−37)	−37 (−38)	−25 (−32)	1 (−17)	15 (−9)	21 (−6)	26 (−3)	22 (−6)	12 (−11)	−7 (−22)	−16 (−27)	−28 (−33)	−37 (−38)
Average precipitation inches (mm)	1.21 (31)	1.09 (28)	1.41 (36)	1.93 (49)	2.01 (51)	1.05 (27)	0.86 (22)	1.08 (27)	1.50 (38)	1.63 (41)	1.35 (34)	1.24 (31)	16.36 (415)
Average snowfall inches (cm)	14.90 (37.8)	13.10 (33.3)	10.00 (25.4)	6.20 (15.7)	1.10 (2.8)	0.10 (0.25)	0.00 (0.00)	0.00 (0.00)	0.30 (0.76)	2.70 (6.9)	10.50 (26.7)	13.30 (33.8)	72.2 (183.41)
Source 1: NOAA
Source 2: XMACIS2 (records & monthly max/mins)

== State Park ==
Rockport State Park is a 550-acre (2.2 km^{2}) state park. The park is used for fishing, waterskiing, swimming, and boating on Rockport Reservoir. There are eight campgrounds, featuring a total of 36 RV sites and 86 tent sites. A cross-country skiing trail is available during the winter.

== See also ==
- List of dams and reservoirs in Utah
- List of Utah State Parks
