= Hailstone, Utah =

Coordinates: 40°36′30″N 111°24′40″W

Location of the former town of Hailstone within the State of Utah

Hailstone was a town in northern Wasatch County, Utah, United States.

== Description ==
Hailstone was located at the junction on the former routing of US-40 and US-189, 7 miles (11 km) north of Heber City. It was submerged in 1995 by the waters of Jordanelle Reservoir along with Jordanelle and Keetley.

Originally known as Elkhorn, Hailstone was homesteaded in 1864 by William Paret Hailstone, Ann Davis Hailstone, and others. The town was a base for mining, ranching, and logging.

== See also ==
- List of ghost towns in Utah
