= Jordanelle Reservoir =

Reservoir in the state of Utah, United States

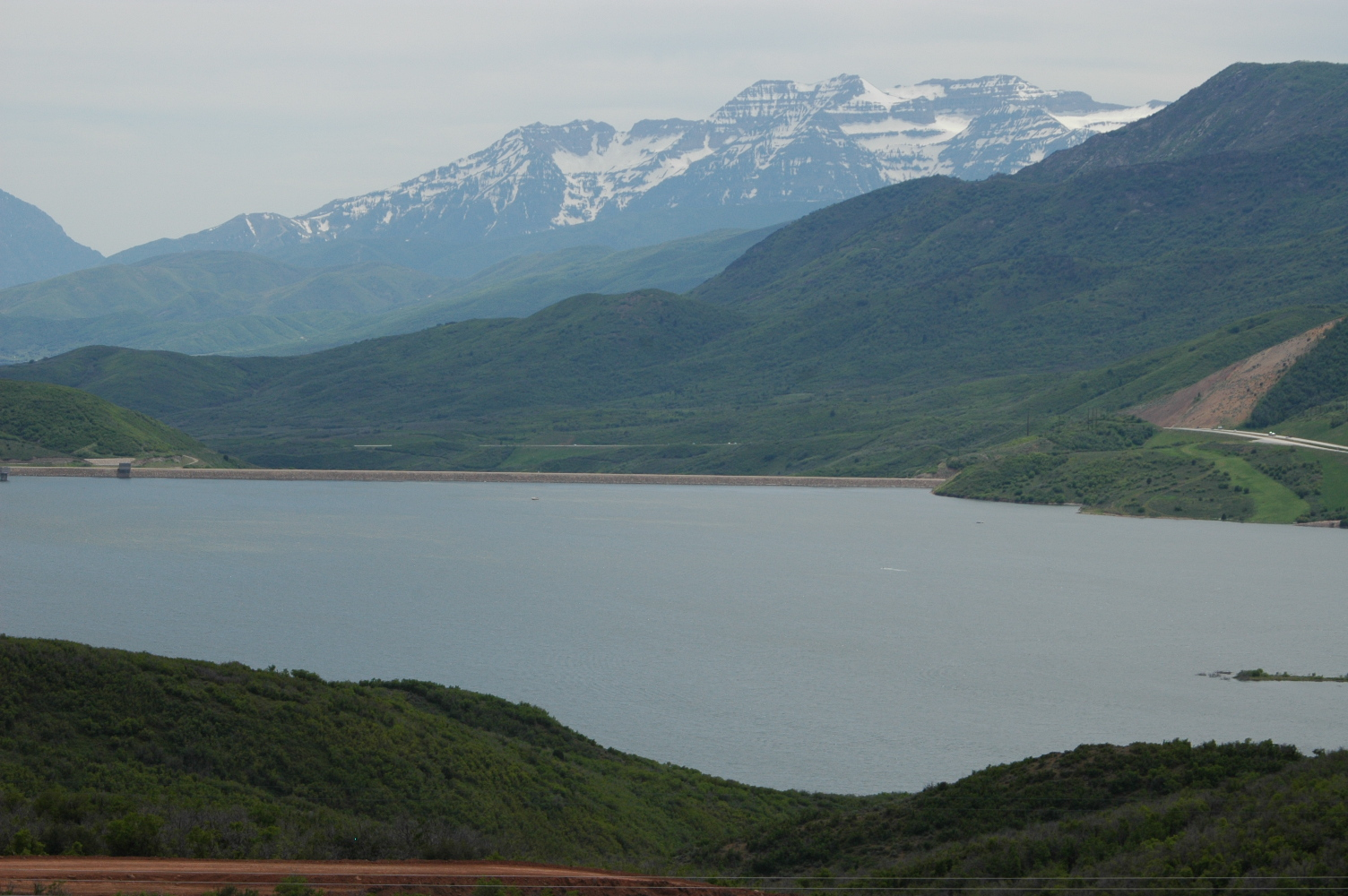
- Looking southwest across the Jordanelle Reservoir, with Mount Timpanogos in the distance and the US-40/US-189 road cut on the right, June 2006

- Location within Utah Location within the United States
- Location: Wasatch County, Utah; United States
- Coordinates: 40°37′0″N 111°24′30″W
- Type: reservoir
- Primary inflows: Provo River
- Primary outflows: Provo River
- Basin countries: United States
- Surface elevation: 6,188 feet (1,886 m)
- Settlements: Hideout
- Website: Official website

Jordanelle Reservoir is a reservoir in Wasatch County, Utah, United States, just north of Heber City.

Jordanelle Reservoir is fed and drained primarily by the Provo River, and is impounded by the Jordanelle Dam, an earthen dam. The construction of the dam resulted in the reroutings of both U.S. Route 40 and U.S. Route 189 (which now run concurrently over the summit of nearby mountains) and the submergence of the towns of Keetley, Hailstone, and Jordanelle.

While Jordanelle Reservoir is popular for water sports, anglers also frequent Jordanelle. Jordanelle has a more broad range of fish species than other local lakes. Anglers visit the lake to target rainbow trout, kokanee salmon, smallmouth bass, perch, wipers, and tiger muskie.

== Jordanelle State Park ==
Construction of the dam started on June 27, 1987, and was completed on April 12, 1993. Jordanelle State Park opened on June 29, 1995. Construction of the dam was challenged by several groups. Conservationists wanted to maintain the natural state of the Provo River. Because of this, a large area at the foot of the dam was converted into an artificial wetland. Other groups were concerned that the site was geologically flawed, citing the catastrophic failure of the Teton Dam in Idaho in 1976. Mining interests in nearby Park City were also concerned, fearing that the reservoir would flood sections of the Ontario silver mine.

During the summer months, Jordanelle is a destination for triathletes and runners alike. Because of the State Park's rugged terrain on the Rock Cliff side, sponsors host sprint triathlons in addition to 10-kilometre (6.2 mi) races and ultra marathons.

== See also ==
- List of dams and reservoirs in Utah
- List of Utah State Parks
