= Francis, Utah =

Town in the state of Utah, United States

- Town
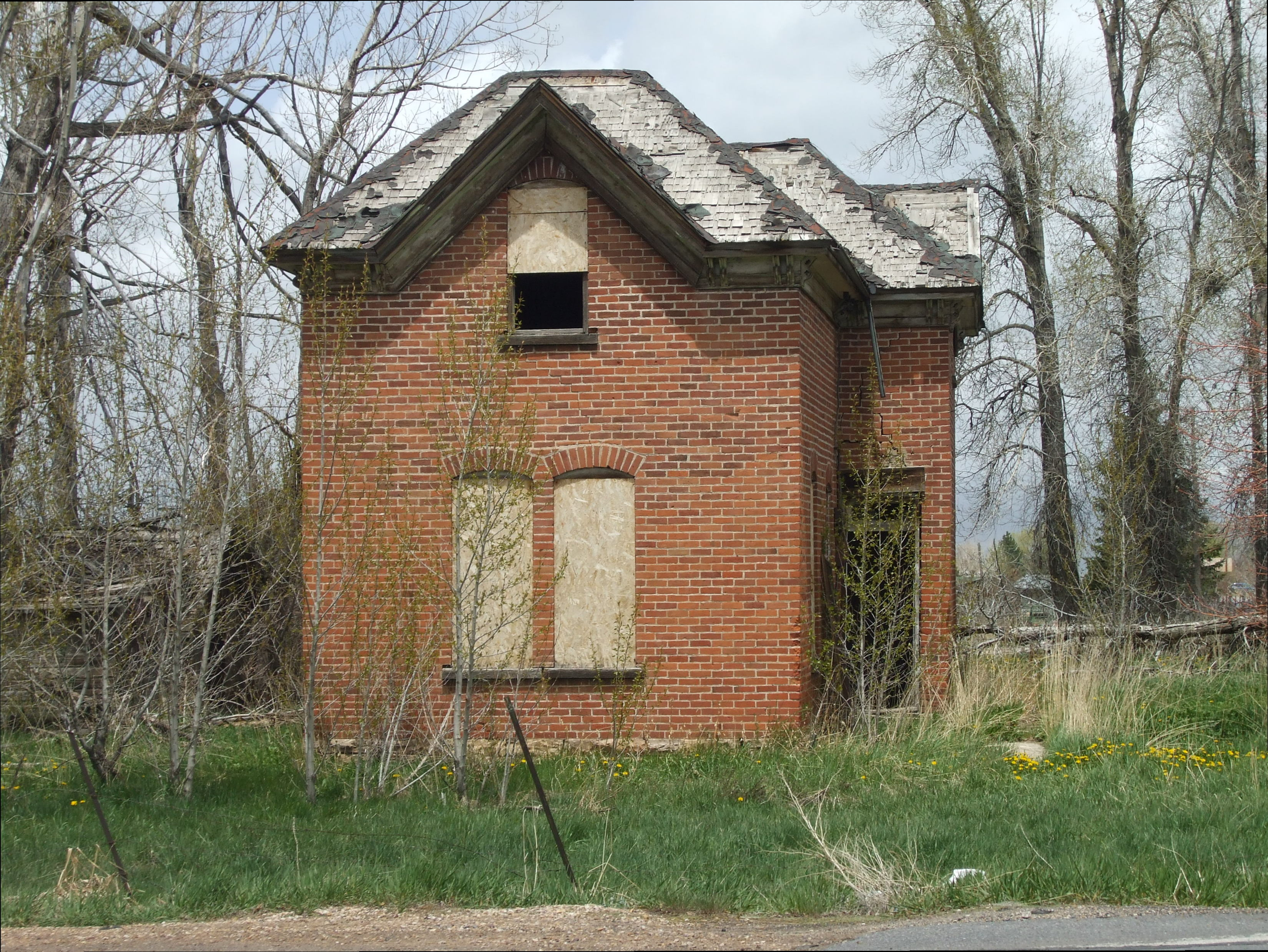
- The Byron T. Mitchell House is listed on the National Register of Historic Places.

- Location in Summit County and the state of Utah
- Coordinates: 40°36′45″N 111°16′56″W
- Country: United States
- State: Utah
- County: Summit
- Settled: 1869
- Incorporated: 1939
- Founder: John Williams
- Named for: Francis M. Lyman

Area
  - Total: 2.98 sq mi (7.72 km^{2})
  - Land: 2.98 sq mi (7.72 km^{2})
  - Water: 0 sq mi (0.00 km^{2})
- Elevation: 6,552 ft (1,997 m)

Population (2020)
  - Total: 1,564
  - Estimate (2019): 1,574
  - Density: 528.0/sq mi (203.87/km^{2})
- Time zone: UTC-7 (Mountain (MST))
  - Summer (DST): UTC-6 (MDT)
- ZIP code: 84036
- Area code: 435
- FIPS code: 49-26940
- GNIS feature ID: 2412652
- Website: francisutah.gov

Francis is a town in the western edge of Summit County, Utah, United States. It is part of the Salt Lake City metropolitan area. The population was 1,564 at the 2020 census.

== Geography ==
According to the United States Census Bureau, the town has a total area of 1.8 square miles (4.7 km^{2}), all land.

== Demographics ==
Historical population
Census	Pop.	Note	%±
1910	184		—
1920	234		27.2%
1930	226		−3.4%
1940	345		52.7%
1950	276		−20.0%
1960	252		−8.7%
1970	268		6.3%
1980	371		38.4%
1990	381		2.7%
2000	698		83.2%
2010	1,077		54.3%
2020	1,564		45.2%
U.S. Decennial Census

=== 2020 census ===
As of the 2020 census, Francis had a population of 1,564. The median age was 34.3 years. 31.5% of residents were under the age of 18 and 9.2% of residents were 65 years of age or older. For every 100 females there were 106.3 males, and for every 100 females age 18 and over there were 103.4 males age 18 and over.

0.0% of residents lived in urban areas, while 100.0% lived in rural areas.

There were 491 households in Francis, of which 49.3% had children under the age of 18 living in them. Of all households, 70.1% were married-couple households, 12.0% were households with a male householder and no spouse or partner present, and 13.8% were households with a female householder and no spouse or partner present. About 12.6% of all households were made up of individuals and 4.9% had someone living alone who was 65 years of age or older.

There were 518 housing units, of which 5.2% were vacant. The homeowner vacancy rate was 0.2% and the rental vacancy rate was 1.8%.

Racial composition as of the 2020 census
Race	Number	Percent
White	1,431	91.5%
Black or African American	3	0.2%
American Indian and Alaska Native	1	0.1%
Asian	4	0.3%
Native Hawaiian and Other Pacific Islander	1	0.1%
Some other race	42	2.7%
Two or more races	82	5.2%
Hispanic or Latino (of any race)	112	7.2%

=== 2000 census ===
As of the census of 2000, there were 698 people, 217 households, and 187 families residing in the town. The population density was 390.2 people per square mile (150.7/km^{2}). There were 233 housing units at an average density of 130.3 per square mile (50.3/km^{2}). The racial makeup of the town was 97.42% White, 0.29% African American, 0.29% Native American, 1.29% from other races, and 0.72% from two or more races. Hispanic or Latino of any race were 1.86% of the population.

There were 217 households, out of which 47.9% had children under the age of 18 living with them, 75.1% were married couples living together, 10.1% had a female householder with no husband present, and 13.4% were non-families. 11.1% of all households were made up of individuals, and 5.5% had someone living alone who was 65 years of age or older. The average household size was 3.22, and the average family size was 3.46.

In the town, the population was spread out, with 33.0% under the age of 18, 8.5% from 18 to 24, 31.8% from 25 to 44, 18.6% from 45 to 64, and 8.2% who were 65 years of age or older. The median age was 31 years. For every 100 females, there were 96.6 males. For every 100 females aged 18 and over, there were 95.0 males.

The median income for a household in the town was $55,536, and the median income for a family was $59,464. Males had a median income of $39,375 versus $26,354 for females. The per capita income for the town was $18,097. About 3.6% of families and 5.6% of the population were below the poverty line, including 8.3% of those under age 18 and 6.5% of those aged 65 or over.

== Education ==
It is in the South Summit School District.

== Transportation ==
High Valley Transit provides service to Francis on the 102 bus, with 3 round-trips in the morning, and 3 round-trips in the afternoon.

== See also ==
- List of cities and towns in Utah
