= Tabiona, Utah =

Town in Duchesne County, Utah, United States

- Town
- Nickname: Tabby
- Location in Duchesne County and the state of Utah
- Coordinates: 40°21′15″N 110°42′34″W
- Country: United States
- State: Utah
- County: Duchesne
- Settled: 1860
- Incorporated: 1935

Area
  - Total: 0.10 sq mi (0.27 km^{2})
  - Land: 0.10 sq mi (0.27 km^{2})
  - Water: 0 sq mi (0.00 km^{2})
- Elevation: 6,526 ft (1,989 m)

Population (2020)
  - Total: 143
  - Density: 1,553.3/sq mi (599.73/km^{2})
- Time zone: UTC-7 (Mountain (MST))
  - Summer (DST): UTC-6 (MDT)
- ZIP code: 84072
- Area code: 435
- FIPS code: 49-74920
- GNIS feature ID: 2413360
- Website: tabionatownut.gov

Tabiona (/tæbiˈoʊnə/ TAB-ee-OH-nə) is a town in Duchesne County, Utah, United States. Located southwest of Tabby Mountain on the Duchesne River. It is eighty-six miles southeast of the Salt Lake City metropolitan area. The population was 143 at the 2020 United States Census.

== History ==
Tabiona is named after Chief Tabby of the Shoshone-Timpanogos Nation of Utah, Formally known as Chief Tabby-To-Kwanah.

== Education ==
Because of its small population, Tabiona houses all 12 grades in the same building. Classrooms serve students from kindergarten through 12th grade, though grade school students attend classes in a separate wing of the school building. Tabiona High competes as a 1A school in athletics and the school mascot is the Tiger. The school colors are purple and white. Tabiona has a rich tradition in basketball. Both the boys' and girls' teams have enjoyed success under coach Lee Gines winning region and state titles. Tabiona was crowned 1A champion in girls basketball in 2007 and won its most recent 1A titles in boys basketball in 1997 and 1999. Tabiona also competes in sports such as girls volleyball and baseball. Student numbers are too low to field teams in other popular sports such as football and soccer.

== Religion ==
The dominant religion in Tabiona is the Church of Jesus Christ of Latter-day Saints. On July 24, 1910, the Tabbyville LDS Branch was established. Shortly after a year the branch changed its name to Tabiona and was organized as a ward. The local church building is about half a block from the high school.

== Geography ==
According to the United States Census Bureau, the town has a total area of 0.1 square miles (0.26 km^{2}), all land.

Historical population
Census	Pop.	Note	%±
1920	308		—
1930	277		−10.1%
1940	211		−23.8%
1950	160		−24.2%
1960	167		4.4%
1970	125		−25.1%
1980	152		21.6%
1990	120		−21.1%
2000	149		24.2%
2010	171		14.8%
2019 (est.)	159		−7.0%
U.S. Decennial Census

== Demographics ==
As of the census of 2020, there were 143 people, 56 households, and 44 families residing in the town. The population density was 1,300.4 people per square mile (442.5/km^{2}). There were 68 housing units at an average density of 524.2 per square mile (202.0/km^{2}). The racial makeup of the town was 97.99% White, 0.67% Native American, 0.67% Pacific Islander, and 0.67% from two or more races. Hispanic or Latino of any race were 2.01% of the population.

There were 50 households, out of which 42.0% had children under the age of 18 living with them, 64.0% were married couples living together, 10.0% had a female householder with no husband present, and 24.0% were non-families. 24.0% of all households were made up of individuals, and 18.0% had someone living alone who was 65 years of age or older. The average household size was 2.98 and the average family size was 3.53.

In the town, the population was spread out, with 37.6% under the age of 18, 7.4% from 18 to 24, 20.8% from 25 to 44, 19.5% from 45 to 64, and 14.8% who were 65 years of age or older. The median age was 34 years. For every 100 females, there were 106.9 males. For every 100 females age 18 and over, there were 89.8 males.

The median income for a household in the town was $66,429. Males had a median income of $60,938 versus $33,750 for females. The per capita income for the town was $25,138. There were 27.7% of families and 10.1% of the population living below the poverty line, including 58.8% of under eighteens and 45.5% of those over 64.

== See also ==
- List of cities and towns in Utah
