= Heber micropolitan area, Utah =

Heber City, UT Micropolitan Statistical Area
- Micropolitan Statistical Area
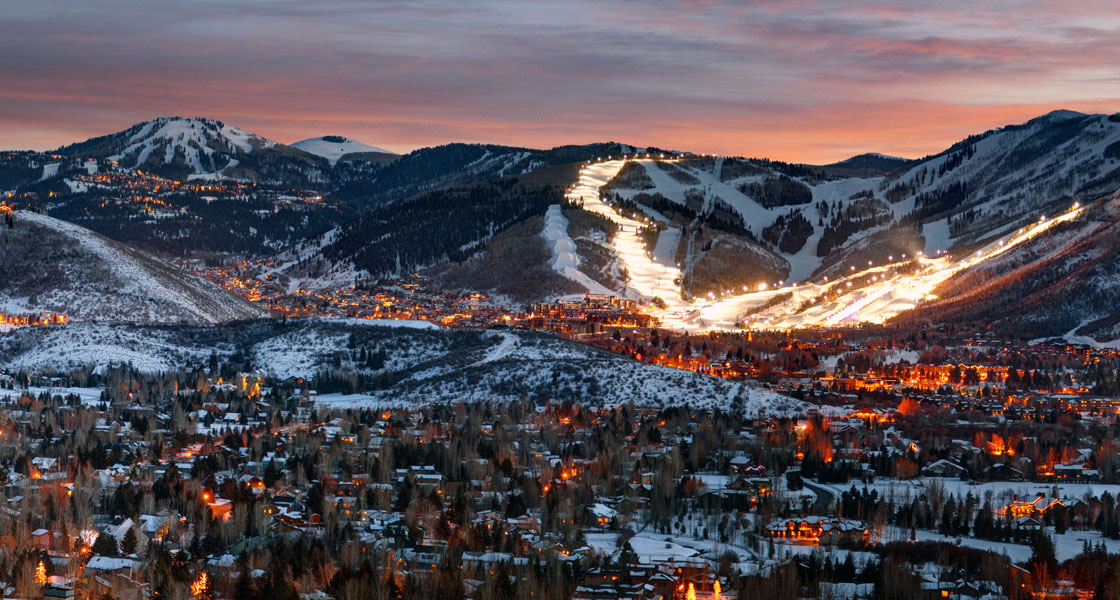
- Overlooking Park City in November 2013
Salt Lake City–Provo–Orem, UT–ID CSA
Salt Lake City–Murray, UT MSA
Provo–Orem–Lehi, UT MSA
Ogden, UT MSA
Heber, UT μSA
Brigham City, UT-ID μSA
- Country: United States
- State: Utah; Idaho
- Largest city: Salt Lake City
- Other principal cities: - West Valley City; - West Jordan; - Provo; - Orem; - Sandy; - Ogden; - Layton; - South Jordan; - Lehi; - Murray; - Clearfield; - Brigham City; - Heber City; - Park City

Area
  - Total: 9,977 sq mi (25,840 km^{2})

Population (2020 census)
  - Total: ▲1,257,936
  - Density: 126/sq mi (49/km^{2})

GDP
  - MSA: $135.4 billion (2022)
- Time zone: UTC−7 (MST)
  - Summer (DST): UTC−6 (MDT)

The Heber Micropolitan Statistical Area, as defined by the United States Office of Management and Budget, is an area consisting of two counties in Utah. It is part of the Salt Lake City–Provo–Orem combined statistical area, along with the Salt Lake City metropolitan area, Ogden–Clearfield metropolitan area, and Provo–Orem metropolitan area.

Previously, Summit County was part of the separate Summit Park micropolitan area, and the Heber micropolitan area consisted of only Wasatch County. However, Summit County has now been absorbed into the Heber micropolitan area.

== Counties ==
- Summit
- Wasatch

== Communities ==
- Charleston
- Coalville
- Daniel
- Echo (unincorporated)
- Francis
- Heber City
- Henefer
- Hideout
- Hoytsville (unincorporated)
- Independence
- Interlaken
- Kamas
- Marion (unincorporated)
- Midway
- Oakley
- Park City
- Peoa (unincorporated)
- Samak (unincorporated)
- Silver Summit (unincorporated)
- Snyderville (unincorporated)
- Summit Park (unincorporated)
- Timber Lakes (unincorporated)
- Wallsburg
- Wanship (unincorporated)
- Woodland (unincorporated)

== See also ==
- Utah census statistical areas
