= Wasatch Back =

Region of northern Utah, United States

Coordinates: 40°30′N 111°30′W

The Wasatch Back is a region in the Rocky Mountains in northern Utah, United States, on the east side of the Wasatch Mountains range. The name Wasatch Back differentiates it from the Wasatch Front, which is the region on the western side of the Wasatch Mountains. The terms are commonly used in local media, and also in scholarly and scientific discussions of the region.

While the Wasatch Front includes most of Utah's more populous cities (such as Salt Lake City, Ogden, Layton, and Provo), the Wasatch Back has a lower population, and the landscape is generally more rural and mountainous with smaller communities such as Park City, Heber City, and Morgan. Summit County (home to Park City) has one of the highest household income levels in the United States.

Originally a mining and agricultural region, the Wasatch Back has experienced rapid residential growth through the 1990s and continuing into the 2000s. Local recreational activities include skiing, snowboarding, snowmobiling, hiking, boating, and horseback riding. Park City is the site of numerous concerts and festivals. It was the home of the Sundance Film Festival from 1979 to 2026.

== Communities ==
=== Morgan County ===
==== Cities ====
- Morgan (county seat)

==== Census-designated places ====
- Enterprise
- Mountain Green

==== Unincorporated places ====
- Croydon
- Littleton
- Milton
- Peterson
- Porterville
- Richville
- Stoddard
- Taggarts
- Whites Crossing

=== Summit County ===
==== Cities ====
- Coalville (county seat)
- Kamas
- Oakley
- Park City

==== Towns ====
- Francis
- Henefer

==== Census-designated places ====
- East Basin
- Echo
- Hoytsville
- Marion
- Peoa
- Samak
- Silver Summit
- Snyderville
- Summit Park
- Wanship
- Woodland

==== Unincorporated communities ====
- Bountiful Peak Summer Home Area
- Castle Rock
- Christmas Meadow Summer Home Area
- Emory
- Grass Creek
- Monviso
- Rockport
- Uintalands
- Upton

=== Wasatch County ===
==== Cities ====
- Heber City (county seat)
- Midway

==== Towns ====
- Charleston
- Daniel
- Hideout
- Independence
- Interlaken
- Wallsburg

==== Census-designated places ====
- Timber Lakes

==== Unincorporated communities ====
- Center Creek
- Deer Mountain
- Mayflower
- Soldier Creek Estates
- Soldier Summit
- Wildwood (part)
