= Wasatch Front =

Coordinates: 40.6°N 111.9°W

- Region
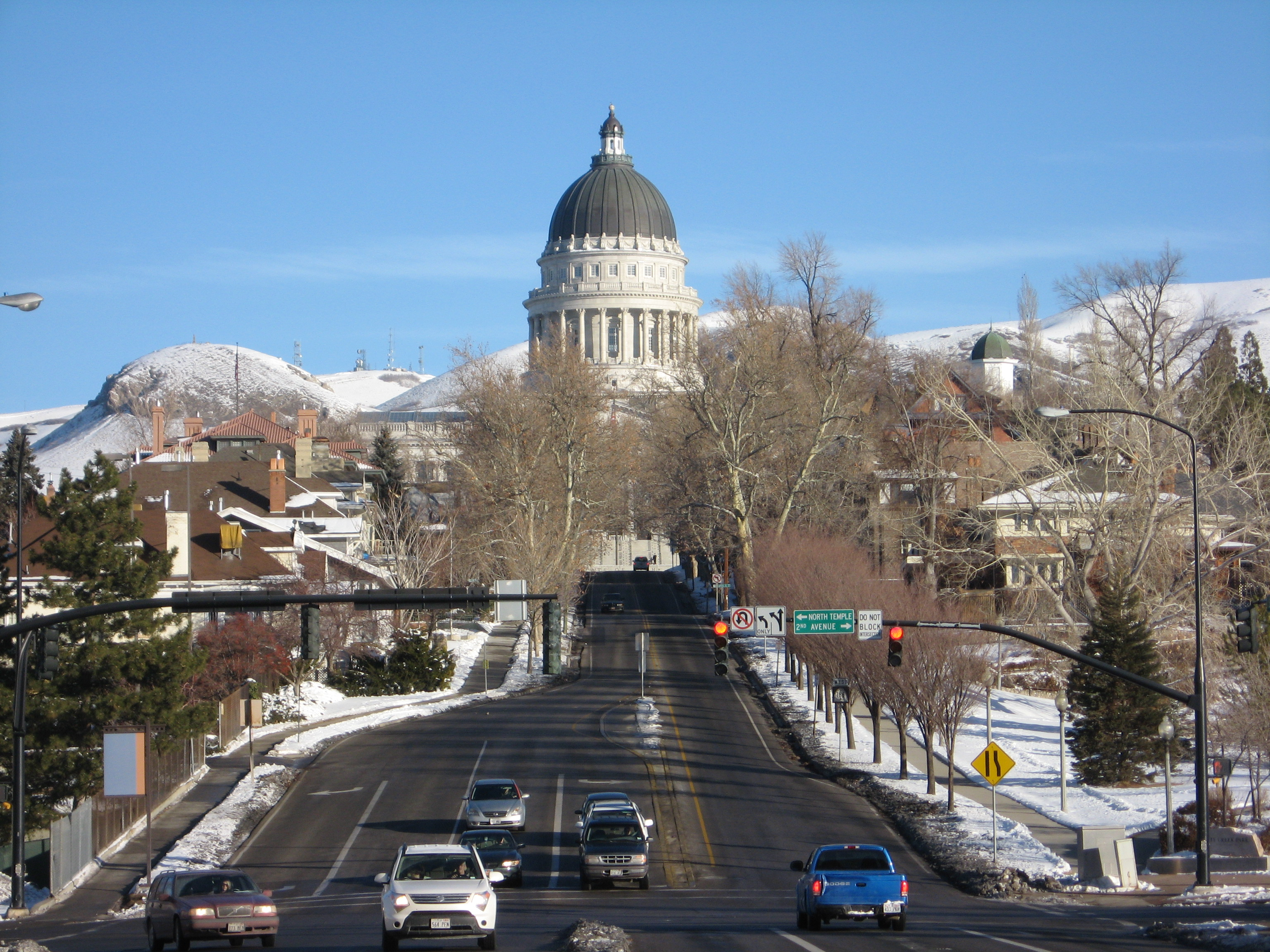
- Utah State Capitol, Salt Lake City

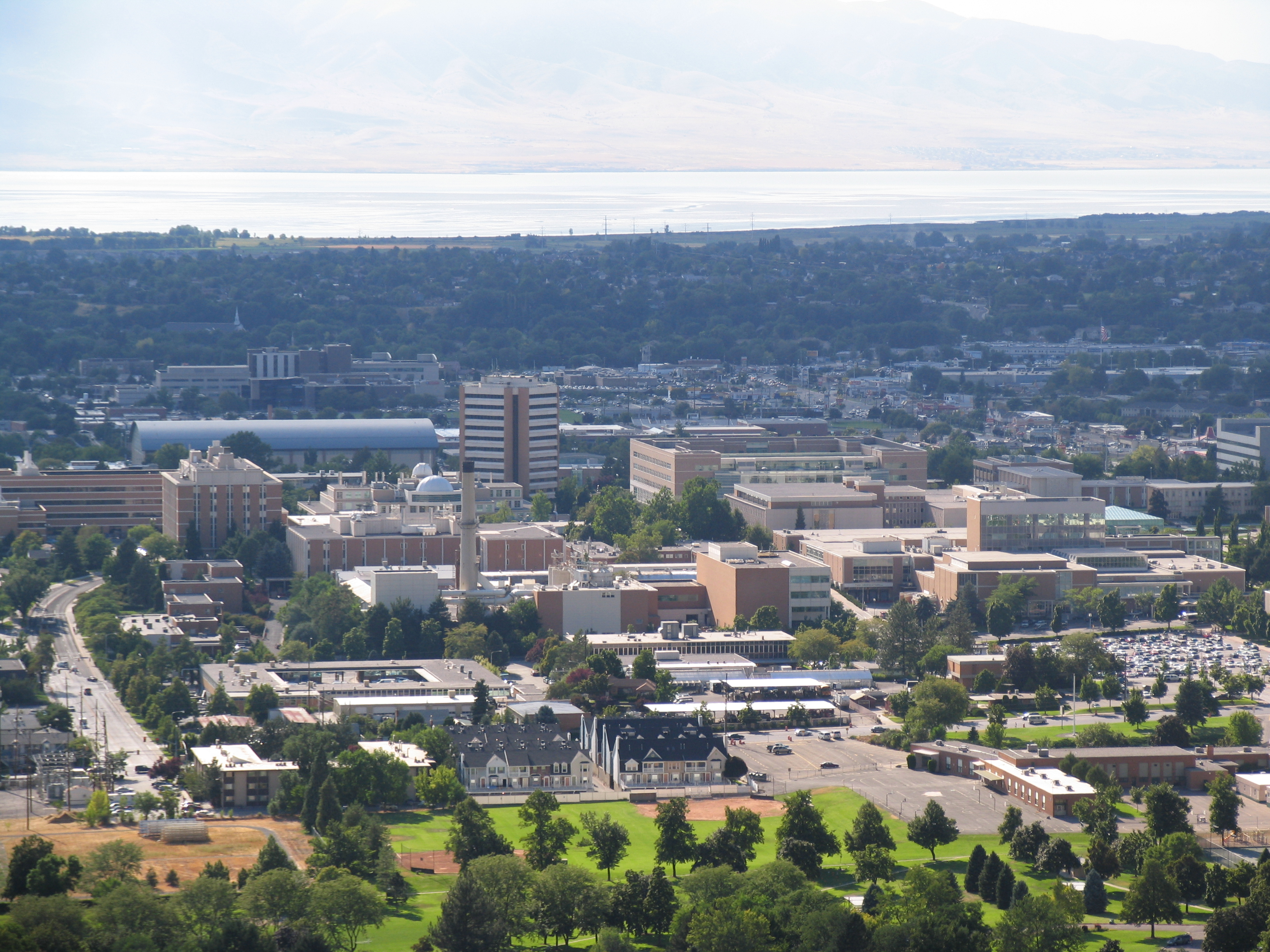
- Brigham Young University, Provo

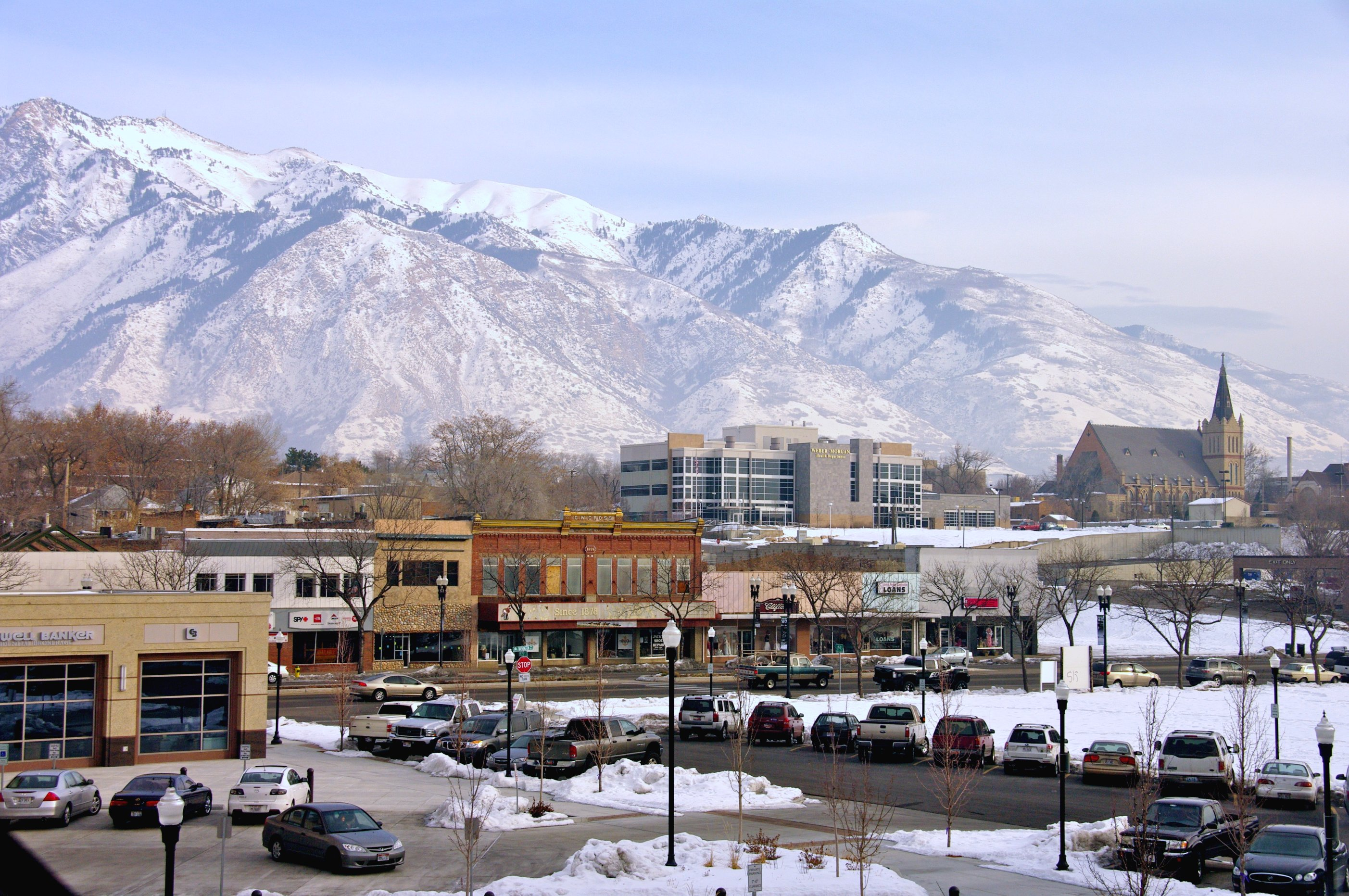
- Downtown Ogden
- Country: United States
- State: Utah

Population (2020)
  - Total: 2,527,205

The Wasatch Front /ˈwɑːsætʃ/ is a major metropolitan region in the north-central part of the U.S. state of Utah. It consists of a chain of contiguous cities and towns stretched along the western side of the Wasatch Range from Santaquin in the south to Pleasant View in the north, and containing the major cities of Salt Lake City, Provo, Orem, Bountiful, Layton, and Ogden along with many smaller communities. The Wasatch Front is contrasted with the Wasatch Back region on the east side of the mountain range.

== Geography ==
The Wasatch Front is a long and relatively narrow strip of land, measuring about 110 miles (177 kilometers) north to south and 30 miles (48 km) east to west at the widest points. To the east, the Wasatch Mountains rise abruptly several thousand feet above the valley floors, climbing to their highest elevation of 11,928 feet (3,636 m) at Mount Nebo (bordering southern Utah Valley). The area's western boundary is formed by Utah Lake in Utah County, the Oquirrh Mountains in Salt Lake County, and the Great Salt Lake in northwestern Salt Lake, Davis, Weber, and southeastern Box Elder county.

Most of the area's residents live between Ogden and Provo (a distance of 80 miles [130 km]), which includes Salt Lake City proper, roughly at the Front's midpoint, but the fullest built-out extent of the Wasatch Front is 120 miles (190 km) long and on average 5 miles (8 km) wide. Along its length, the Wasatch Front never exceeds a width of approximately 18 miles (29 km) because of the natural barriers of lakes and mountains.

Sustained drought in Utah has more recently strained the region's water security, causing the Great Salt Lake to drop to record low levels, and affecting the state's economy, of which the Wasatch Front constitutes 80%.

== Climate ==
The Wasatch Front is a semi-arid region at the eastern edge of the Great Basin. The urban corridor mainly lies in zone 7 with minimum average winter temperatures ranging between 0 and 20 °F (−18 and −7 °C) and daytime high temperatures ranging from the mid-30 °F to mid-40 °F range (-1 and 4 °C). Snowfall is common during winter but often melts rapidly. Inversions commonly occur along the Wasatch Front during mid-winter making for very cold temperatures and gloomy conditions lasting for several weeks at times in the valleys, while the higher mountain elevations will experience clear and warmer conditions. Localized lake-effect snowfall from the Great Salt Lake is common in the late Fall and early winter. The first freeze usually occurs in early October in the outlying areas but can occur as late as early November in the inner urban areas. The last freeze can occur broadly between early April and late May.

Summers are generally hot and dry, with the exception of the summer thunderstorm seasonal pattern which usually runs from early July through early September, when often intense thunderstorms occur due to mid-latitude weather patterns including the Pacific storm track. Daytime high temperatures are around 95 °F (35 °C), with higher temperatures often created by the urban heat island effect.

== Population centers ==
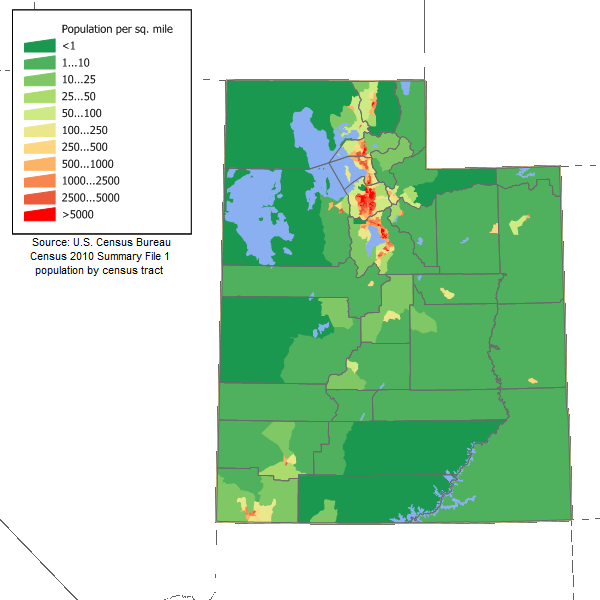
A map of the population density in Utah's counties, showing the Wasatch Front as the most populous region

Several downtown and commercial districts encompass the Wasatch Front, including the Salt Lake City metropolitan area, the Provo–Orem metropolitan area (south of Salt Lake), and the Ogden-Clearfield metropolitan area (north of Salt Lake). Nearly all of the cities within the region are connected by continuous suburban development.

Rank	County	2010 census	2020 census	Growth %
1	Salt Lake	1,029,655	1,185,238	+15.11%
2	Utah	516,564	659,399	+27.65%
3	Davis	306,479	362,679	+18.34%
4	Weber	231,236	262,223	+13.40%
8	Box Elder	49,975	57,666	+15.39%
Total		2,133,909	2,527,205	+18.43%

== Transportation ==
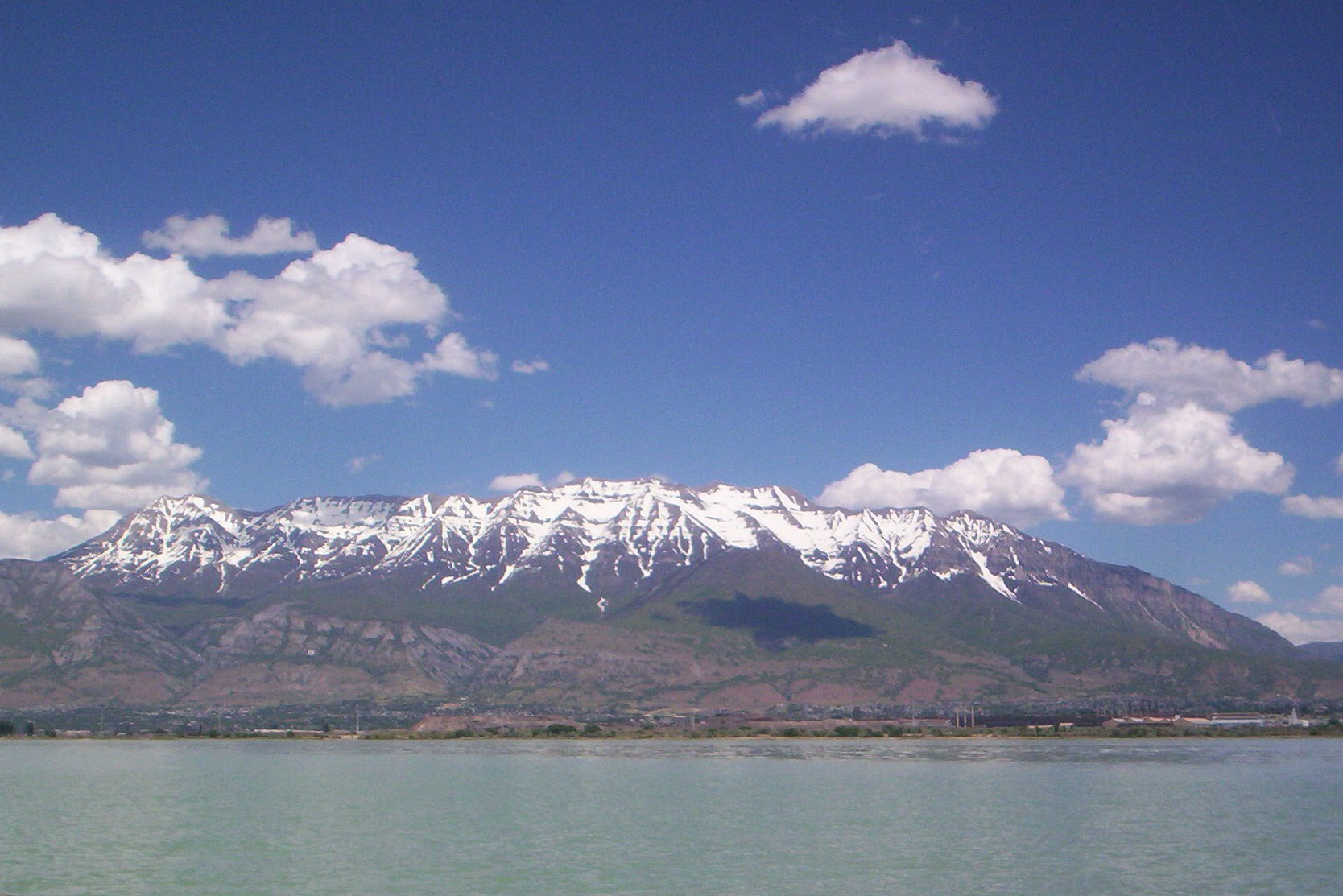
Mount Timpanogos, in the Wasatch Range, viewed from Utah Lake. Several Wasatch Front cities lie between these natural features.

Ogden has served as a major railway hub through much of its history. The First transcontinental railroad was constructed between 1863 and 1869, with the tracks reaching Ogden on March 27, 1869. Trains heading east from Ogden must negotiate the highest reaches of eastern Utah, travelling through Weber and Echo Canyons and over the Wasatch Pass at an elevation of 6,792 feet.

Union Pacific has operated the world's most powerful locomotives to haul freight over the Wasatch Mountains between Cheyenne and Ogden, including American Locomotive Company's famous "Big Boys", with one preserved example (No. 4014) being the world's largest and most powerful operating steam locomotive; GE's Gas Turbines known as the "Big Blows" (because of their distinctive sound), the world's most powerful internal combustion locomotive; and GM's "Big Jacks", the most powerful single-unit diesel locomotive type ever built.

Transportation issues within the metropolitan area have been complicated by the narrow north–south orientation of the valley, constrained by the natural barriers on both sides, and the rapid growth of the region.

The primary modes of transport for the area are Interstate 15 (I‑15) and U.S. Route 89 (US‑89), both of which run down its center from north to south for the full length of about 120 miles (190 km). Other interstates and highways provide transportation routes to local areas within the Wasatch Front. Such transportation routes include Interstate 84 in the Ogden area; the Legacy Parkway (State Route 67) running north–south through western Davis County; Interstate 80 running east–west through Salt Lake City; Interstate 215 (I‑215) circling the inner Salt Lake Valley; the Mountain View Corridor (State Route 85), Bangerter Highway (State Route 154), and State Route 201 to the west of Salt Lake City; U.S. Route 189 through Provo, and U.S. Route 6 in southern Utah County.

The Utah Transit Authority provides bus and light rail (TRAX) service to most of the urban areas within the Wasatch Front. Additionally, a double-decker commuter rail line FrontRunner, running from North Ogden to Provo, is in full operation.

The California Zephyr of Amtrak is the primary rail transport leading in and out of the Wasatch Front, having a station in Salt Lake City and Provo.

Salt Lake City International Airport serves as the primary airport for the region. Ogden-Hinckley Airport and Provo Municipal Airport also provide scheduled commercial air service.

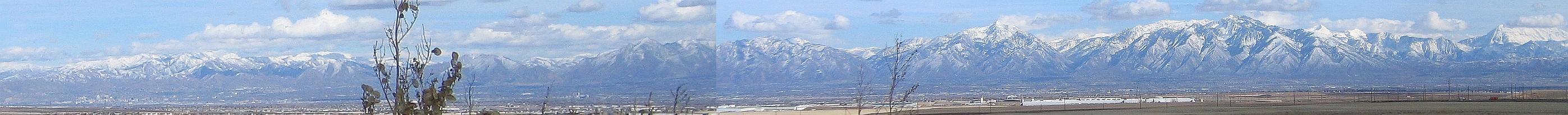
The Salt Lake Valley urban area, part of the Wasatch Front. The Wasatch Range prevents the Wasatch Front from expanding further eastward.

== Growth and land use ==
Because of the geographical barriers to the east and west, much of the land along the Wasatch Front has been developed. The region has experienced considerable growth since the 1950s, with its population increasing 308% from 492,374 to 2,051,330. Much of the remaining undeveloped land is rapidly being developed, and local governments have grappled with problems of urban sprawl and other land-use concerns.

The region on the other side of the Wasatch Range, including cities such as Park City, Morgan, Heber City, and Midway, is sometimes referred to as the Wasatch Back and has recently shared in the rapid growth of the region.

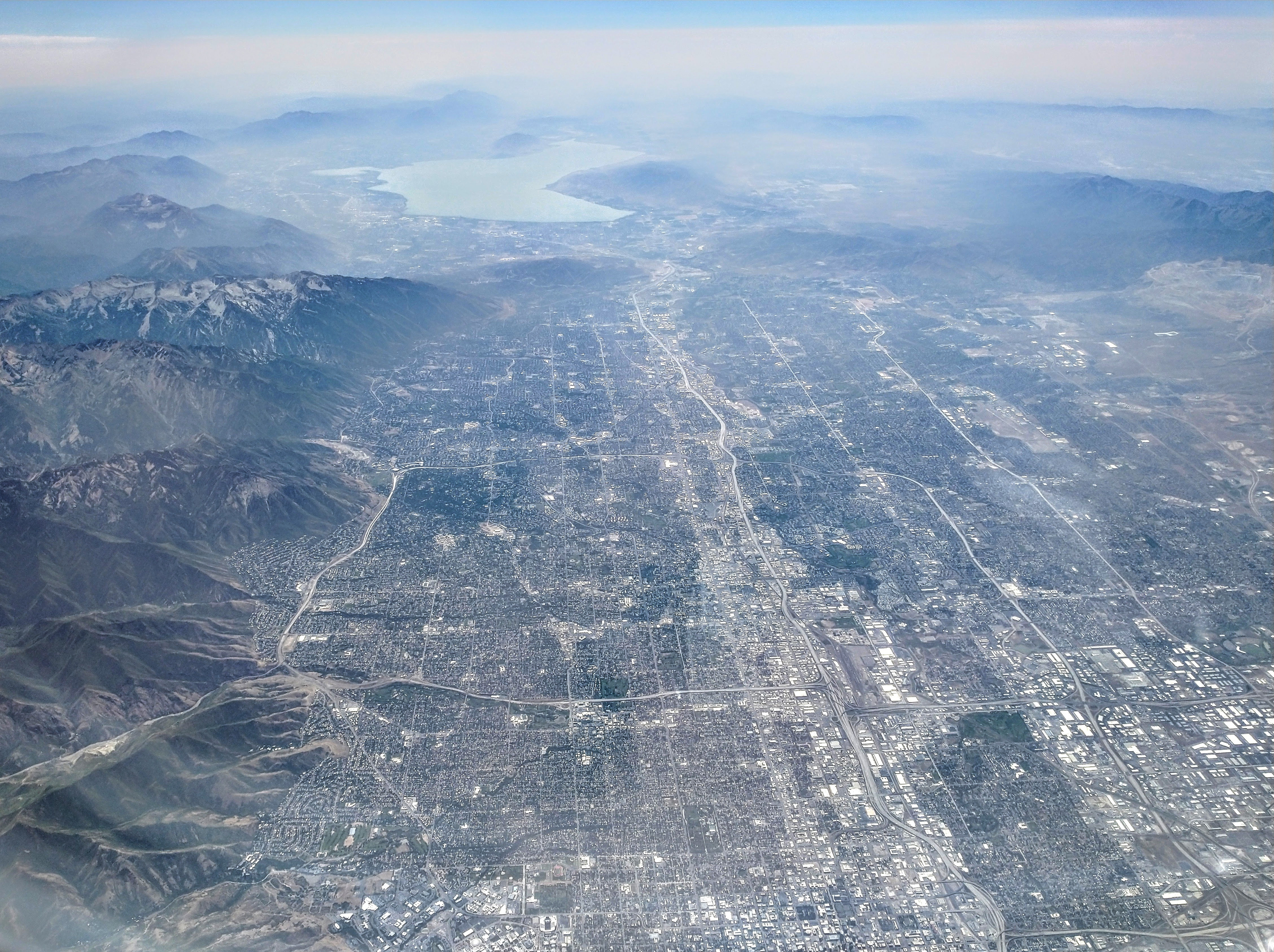
An aerial view looking south along the Wasatch Front, in 2021.

== See also ==
- Salt Lake City metropolitan area
- Wasatch Back
- Wasatch Fault
- 2003 Utah snowstorm
