= Utah statistical areas =

Coordinates: 39.3055°N 111.6703°W

The U.S. State of Utah currently has 12 statistical areas that have been delineated by the Office of Management and Budget (OMB). On July 21, 2023, the OMB delineated one combined statistical area, five metropolitan statistical areas, and six micropolitan statistical areas in Utah. As of 2023, the largest of these is the Salt Lake City-Provo-Orem, UT-ID CSA, anchored by Utah's capital and largest city, Salt Lake City.

== Statistical areas ==
The Office of Management and Budget (OMB) has designated more than 1,000 statistical areas for the United States and Puerto Rico. These statistical areas are important geographic delineations of population clusters used by the OMB, the United States Census Bureau, planning organizations, and federal, state, and local government entities.

The OMB defines a core-based statistical area (commonly referred to as a CBSA) as the county or counties (or county-equivalents) surrounding at least one densely-settled core of at least 10,000 population, "plus adjacent counties having a high degree of social and economic integration with the core as measured through commuting ties with the counties containing the core". The OMB further divides core-based statistical areas based on population into metropolitan statistical areas (MSAs) for those with at least 50,000 and micropolitan statistical areas (μSAs) for those with 10,000 to 49,999 people.

The OMB defines a combined statistical area (CSA) as two or more adjacent core-based statistical areas where the employment interchange rate (% commuting from A to B plus % commuting from B to A) is at least 15%. The primary statistical areas (PSAs) include all combined statistical areas and any core-based statistical area that is not a constituent of a combined statistical area.

The 12 United States statistical areas and 29 counties of the State of Utah (Note: An out-of-state area and its population are displayed in green. An area that extends into more than one state is displayed in purple. A purple population number over a black population number show the total population versus the in-state population. The state's abbreviation is also shown next to the in-state total.)
Combined statistical area	2025 population (est.)	Core-based statistical area	2025 population (est.)	County	2025 population (est.)
Salt Lake City–Provo–Orem, UT-ID CSA	2,906,647; 2,901,562 (UT)	Salt Lake City-Murray, UT MSA	1,308,377	Salt Lake County, Utah	1,220,916
Salt Lake City–Provo–Orem, UT-ID CSA	2,906,647; 2,901,562 (UT)	Salt Lake City-Murray, UT MSA	1,308,377	Tooele County, Utah	87,461
Salt Lake City–Provo–Orem, UT-ID CSA	2,906,647; 2,901,562 (UT)	Provo-Orem-Lehi, UT MSA	773,426	Utah County, Utah	759,859
Salt Lake City–Provo–Orem, UT-ID CSA	2,906,647; 2,901,562 (UT)	Provo-Orem-Lehi, UT MSA	773,426	Juab County, Utah	13,567
Salt Lake City–Provo–Orem, UT-ID CSA	2,906,647; 2,901,562 (UT)	Ogden, UT MSA	672,784	Davis County, Utah	381,227
Salt Lake City–Provo–Orem, UT-ID CSA	2,906,647; 2,901,562 (UT)	Ogden, UT MSA	672,784	Weber County, Utah	278,174
Salt Lake City–Provo–Orem, UT-ID CSA	2,906,647; 2,901,562 (UT)	Ogden, UT MSA	672,784	Morgan County, Utah	13,383
Salt Lake City–Provo–Orem, UT-ID CSA	2,906,647; 2,901,562 (UT)	Heber, UT μSA	81,655	Summit County, Utah	43,141
Salt Lake City–Provo–Orem, UT-ID CSA	2,906,647; 2,901,562 (UT)	Heber, UT μSA	81,655	Wasatch County, Utah	38,514
Salt Lake City–Provo–Orem, UT-ID CSA	2,906,647; 2,901,562 (UT)	Brigham City, UT-ID μSA	70,405; 65,320 (UT)	Box Elder County, Utah	65,320
Salt Lake City–Provo–Orem, UT-ID CSA	2,906,647; 2,901,562 (UT)	Brigham City, UT-ID μSA	70,405; 65,320 (UT)	Oneida County, ID	5,085
none		St. George, UT MSA	213,670	Washington County, Utah	213,670
none		Logan, UT-ID MSA	160,889; 145,000 (UT)	Cache County, Utah	145,000
none		Logan, UT-ID MSA	160,889; 145,000 (UT)	Franklin County, Idaho	15,494
none		Cedar City, UT μSA	67,141	Iron County, Utah	67,141
none		Vernal, UT μSA	38,278	Uintah County, Utah	38,278
none		Price, UT μSA	20,680	Carbon County, Utah	20,680
none		Evanston, WY-UT μSA	38,305; 2,687	Uinta County, WY	38,305
none		Evanston, WY-UT μSA	38,305; 2,687	Rich County, Utah	2,687
none		none		Sanpete County, Utah	31,453
none		none		Sevier County, Utah	22,827
none		none		Duchesne County, Utah	20,856
none		none		San Juan County, Utah	14,542
none		none		Millard County, Utah	14,057
none		none		Emery County, Utah	10,177
none		none		Grand County, Utah	9,790
none		none		Kane County, Utah	8,597
none		none		Beaver County, Utah	7,301
none		none		Garfield County, Utah	5,256
none		none		Wayne County, Utah	2,587
none		none		Piute County, Utah	1,509
none		none		Daggett County, Utah	934
State of Utah					3,538,904

The 11 core-based statistical areas of the State of Utah (Note: For CBSAs comprising populations from multiple states, they are listed twice to show both their intrastate population within that CBSA as well as the CBSA's total population. Only the intrastate population is ranked.)
2025 rank	Core-based statistical area	Population				
2025 rank	Core-based statistical area	2025 estimate	Change	2020 Census	Change	2010 Census
1	Salt Lake City-Murray, UT MSA	1,308,377	+4.01%	1,257,936	+15.63%	1,087,873
2	Provo-Orem-Lehi, UT MSA	773,426	+15.23%	671,185	+27.41%	526,810
3	Ogden-Clearfield, UT MSA	672,784	+5.58%	637,197	+16.45%	547,184
4	St. George, UT MSA	213,670	+18.52%	180,279	+30.53%	138,115
5	Logan, UT-ID MSA (UT)	145,000	+8.90%	133,154	+18.20%	112,656
6	Heber, UT μSA	81,655	+5.85%	77,145	+28.89%	59,854
7	Cedar City, UT μSA	67,141	+17.20%	57,289	+24.10%	46,163
8	Brigham City, UT-ID μSA (UT)	65,320	+13.27%	57,666	+15.39%	49,975
9	Vernal, UT μSA	38,278	+7.46%	35,620	+9.30%	32,588
10	Price, UT μSA	20,680	+1.31%	20,412	−4.63%	21,403
11	Evanston, WY-UT μSA (UT)	2,687	+7.05%	2,510	+10.87%	2,264
	Brigham City, UT-ID μSA	70,405	+13.14%	62,230	+14.69%	54,261
	Evanston, WY-UT μSA	38,305	+66.83%	22,960	−1.80%	23,382
	Logan, UT-ID MSA	160,889	+9.19%	147,348	+17.46%	125,442

The one combined statistical area of the State of Utah (Note: For CSAs comprising populations from multiple states, they are listed twice to show both their intrastate population within that CSA as well as the CSA's total population. Only the intrastate population is ranked.)
2025 rank	Combined statistical area	Population				
2025 rank	Combined statistical area	2025 estimate	Change	2020 Census	Change	2010 Census
1	Salt Lake City-Provo-Orem, UT-ID CSA (UT)	2,901,562	+7.42%	2,701,129	+18.90%	2,271,696
	Salt Lake City-Provo-Orem, UT-ID CSA	2,906,647	+7.43%	2,705,693	+18.88%	2,275,982

== See also ==
- Geography of Utah
  - Demographics of Utah
