= Climate of Salt Lake City =

Salt Lake City

Climate chart (precipitation, max. and min. temperature)
J	F	M	A	M	J	J	A	S	O	N	D
1.4 39 24	1.3 45 29	1.8 55 36	2.2 62 42	1.8 73 50	1 84 59	0.5 94 68	0.6 92 67	1.1 81 56	1.3 66 44	1.3 51 33	1.4 39 25
- █ Average max. and min. temperatures in °F
- █ Precipitation totals in inches
- Source: NCDC
Metric conversion
J	F	M	A	M	J	J	A	S	O	N	D
36 4 −4	33 7 −2	44 13 2	55 17 5	46 23 10	24 29 15	12 34 20	15 33 19	27 27 14	32 19 6	34 10 0	36 4 −4
- █ Average max. and min. temperatures in °C
- █ Precipitation totals in mm

The climate of Salt Lake City, Utah features cold and snowy winters, hot and dry summers, and modest to light seasonal rainfall. Lying in the Salt Lake Valley, the city is surrounded by mountains and the Great Salt Lake. Under the Köppen climate classification, Salt Lake City has either a Mediterranean climate (Csa) or dry-summer continental climate (Dsa) depending on which variant of the system is used, though it borders on a cold semi-arid climate (BSk) due to the city's relatively low precipitation.

The city has four distinct seasons: a cold, snowy winter; a hot, dry summer; and two relatively wet transition periods. The Pacific Ocean is the primary influence on the weather, contributing storms from about October to May, with spring being the wettest season. Snow falls frequently during the winter, contributed largely by the lake-effect from the Great Salt Lake. The only source of precipitation in the summer is monsoon moisture moving north from the Gulf of California. Summers are hot, frequently reaching above 100 °F (38 °C), while winters are cold and snowy. The Rocky Mountains to the east and north usually block powerful polar highs from affecting the state during the winter. Temperatures rarely fall below 0 °F (−18 °C), but frequently stay below freezing. Temperature inversions during winter can lead to thick overnight fog and daytime haze in the valley as cool air, moisture, and pollutants are trapped in the valley by surrounding mountains.

== Overview ==
Climate data for Salt Lake City International Airport (1991–2020 normals, (Note: Mean monthly maxima and minima (i.e. the expected highest and lowest temperature readings at any point during the year or given month) calculated based on data at said location from 1991 to 2020.) extremes 1874–present) (Note: The official Salt Lake City climatology station was located in downtown from March 1874 to April 30, 1928 and at Salt Lake City Int'l since May 1, 1928. For further information, see ThreadEx.)
Month	Jan	Feb	Mar	Apr	May	Jun	Jul	Aug	Sep	Oct	Nov	Dec	Year
Record high °F (°C)	63 (17)	69 (21)	84 (29)	89 (32)	99 (37)	107 (42)	109 (43)	106 (41)	107 (42)	92 (33)	75 (24)	69 (21)	109 (43)
Mean maximum °F (°C)	51.8 (11.0)	58.8 (14.9)	70.4 (21.3)	80.2 (26.8)	88.9 (31.6)	97.9 (36.6)	101.9 (38.8)	99.6 (37.6)	93.9 (34.4)	82.0 (27.8)	67.1 (19.5)	54.3 (12.4)	102.3 (39.1)
Mean daily maximum °F (°C)	38.6 (3.7)	44.7 (7.1)	55.3 (12.9)	61.9 (16.6)	72.6 (22.6)	84.1 (28.9)	94.0 (34.4)	91.7 (33.2)	80.6 (27.0)	65.5 (18.6)	50.7 (10.4)	39.0 (3.9)	64.9 (18.3)
Daily mean °F (°C)	31.4 (−0.3)	36.6 (2.6)	45.8 (7.7)	51.8 (11.0)	61.5 (16.4)	71.6 (22.0)	81.1 (27.3)	79.1 (26.2)	68.4 (20.2)	54.6 (12.6)	41.7 (5.4)	32.2 (0.1)	54.7 (12.6)
Mean daily minimum °F (°C)	24.2 (−4.3)	28.6 (−1.9)	36.3 (2.4)	41.8 (5.4)	50.4 (10.2)	59.1 (15.1)	68.2 (20.1)	66.6 (19.2)	56.3 (13.5)	43.6 (6.4)	32.8 (0.4)	25.3 (−3.7)	44.4 (6.9)
Mean minimum °F (°C)	6.5 (−14.2)	9.2 (−12.7)	21.0 (−6.1)	28.7 (−1.8)	34.8 (1.6)	43.5 (6.4)	54.9 (12.7)	52.4 (11.3)	39.7 (4.3)	29.5 (−1.4)	16.9 (−8.4)	7.3 (−13.7)	0.9 (−17.3)
Record low °F (°C)	−22 (−30)	−30 (−34)	0 (−18)	14 (−10)	25 (−4)	32 (0)	40 (4)	37 (3)	27 (−3)	14 (−10)	−14 (−26)	−21 (−29)	−30 (−34)
Average precipitation inches (mm)	1.43 (36)	1.30 (33)	1.75 (44)	2.16 (55)	1.82 (46)	0.95 (24)	0.49 (12)	0.58 (15)	1.06 (27)	1.26 (32)	1.32 (34)	1.40 (36)	15.52 (394)
Average snowfall inches (cm)	12.7 (32)	10.7 (27)	5.9 (15)	2.9 (7.4)	0.1 (0.25)	0.0 (0.0)	0.0 (0.0)	0.0 (0.0)	0.0 (0.0)	0.5 (1.3)	7.0 (18)	12.1 (31)	51.9 (132)
Average precipitation days (≥ 0.01 in)	10.3	9.5	9.2	10.4	8.9	4.8	3.9	4.9	5.2	6.5	8.3	9.6	91.5
Average snowy days (≥ 0.1 in)	7.6	6.0	4.0	2.2	0.2	0.0	0.0	0.0	0.0	0.7	3.6	7.1	31.4
Average relative humidity (%)	74.0	69.8	60.2	53.2	48.7	41.4	35.9	38.5	45.6	55.7	66.3	74.3	55.3
Average dew point °F (°C)	19.9 (−6.7)	24.1 (−4.4)	27.1 (−2.7)	31.1 (−0.5)	36.9 (2.7)	41.4 (5.2)	45.7 (7.6)	45.1 (7.3)	39.9 (4.4)	34.5 (1.4)	28.4 (−2.0)	21.7 (−5.7)	33.0 (0.5)
Mean monthly sunshine hours	127.4	163.1	241.9	269.1	321.7	360.5	380.5	352.5	301.1	248.1	150.4	113.1	3,029.4
Percentage possible sunshine	43	55	65	67	72	80	83	83	81	72	50	39	68
Average ultraviolet index	1.7	2.7	4.6	6.6	8.4	9.8	10.4	9.0	6.6	4.0	2.2	1.4	5.6
Source 1: NOAA (relative humidity and sun 1961–1990)
Source 2: UV Index Today (1995 to 2022)

See or edit raw graph data.

== Temperatures ==
Winter temperatures are not as extreme as might be expected, given the elevation 4,300 feet (1,310 m) and latitude (40°45'N) of the city. The Rocky Mountains to the east and northeast of the state block most cold waves from polar highs positioned in the Great Plains from reaching the city. The frigidly cold air that does affect the city must come directly from the north or north-northwest from western Canada through fewer and lower intervening mountains. Temperatures seldom fall below 0 °F (−17.8 °C); Salt Lake City has experienced sub-zero temperatures during only 4 storm cycles in the last 10 years. However, the average sub-zero days in a year is 2. Salt Lake City averages 26 days with high temperatures at or below freezing. In winter, warm air from the surrounding Desert Southwest is usually only drawn up to the city in advance of a cold front arriving from the northwest.

January is the coldest month with an average temperature of 29.2 °F (−1.6 °C). Salt Lake City's record low maximum temperature is 2 °F (−16.7 °C), set on December 22, 1990, during an extended period of frigid Arctic air, and its overall record low temperature is −30 °F (−34.4 °C), set on February 9, 1933 during a historic cold air surge from the north. During spring, temperatures warm steadily and rapidly. Wintry weather is usually last experienced in April. Summery weather first arrives in May; the earliest 90 °F (32.2 °C) temperature on record was on May 2. Major cold fronts typically stop arriving in May or June.

Summer temperatures are hot, although are moderated somewhat by the cool breezes from the Great Salt Lake and by the city's elevation. The lack of cold fronts in summer allows the temperatures to become consistently hot due to powerful, long-lasting high pressure . Occasional thunderstorms give almost the only relief in temperatures. In an average year, 5 days hotter than 100 °F (37.8 °C), 23 days greater than 95 °F (35.0 °C), and 56 days greater than 90 °F (32.2 °C) can be expected. However, such days also have very low humidity. The low humidity and the altitude create ideal conditions for radiational cooling, and hence, large swings in temperature. Summer nights are rather cool; the record low even in July is 40 °F (4.4 °C). July is the warmest month, with an average temperature of 77 °F (25.0 °C). Salt Lake City's record high minimum temperature is 81 °F (27.2 °C), set on July 18, 2016, and its record high temperature is 109 °F (43 °C), set on July 12, 2026. The last summer-like weather is typically experienced in September; the latest 90 °F (32 °C) temperature was recorded on September 30. Temperatures cool down rapidly in fall. The first major cold fronts typically arrive anytime from September to October. The first winter-like weather is usually experienced in November.

Salt Lake City's average yearly temperature is 52.1 °F (11.2 °C), and the freeze-free period lasts an average of 167 days, from April 30 to October 15, although it has lasted anywhere from 124 to 236 days. Freezing temperatures have occurred as early as September 13 (in 1928), and as late as May 28 (in 1954).

== Precipitation ==
Both precipitation and humidity are highest from March through May and lowest from June through mid-September. Major sources of precipitation are winter snow storms originating in the Gulf of Alaska, late winter and spring rains from the Pineapple Express created in Hawaiian waters, and summer monsoons from the Gulf of California. The airport averages 16.5 inches (419 mm) of precipitation per year, with bench areas receiving up to 20 inches (508 mm), mainly due to increased snowfall. April is the wettest month, averaging 2.16 inches (54.9 mm) of precipitation. Average year-round humidity is 55%.

The summer monsoon rising from Mexico and Arizona passes through the region beginning in mid-July and continuing into September, bringing intense but short-lived thunderstorm activity. Tornadoes have been known to occur during this time period, the most notable recent example being in 1999 when an F2 tornado struck downtown Salt Lake City, causing extensive damage and resulting in one death. Many of these thunderstorms consist of dry lightning, which occurs when humidity is too low to support rainfall and the rain evaporates before reaching the ground. This is the main cause of wildfires in Utah during summer. Smoke from such fires in nearby areas sometimes make their way into the valley. Despite the intensity of the thunderstorms, the low humidity, short duration, and isolationism of the thunderstorms all play a part in making this the driest season. July is the driest month, with only 0.72 inches (18 mm) of precipitation on average. In late fall, the Pacific Ocean usually begins to kick in again, and starting in late September precipitation begins to increase. During late summer and fall, remnants of tropical cyclones from the East Pacific occasionally reach Utah, resulting in heavy tropical rains. Weather events such as hail, freezing rain, and sleet are uncommon in Salt Lake City. When they do occur, they are of short duration and rarely accumulate. The record precipitation for a single month occurred in September 1982, with 7.04 inches (179 mm), largely due to the remnants of Hurricane Olivia. The record 24‑hour precipitation occurred from April 22–23, 1957, when 2.41 inches (61.2 mm) fell.

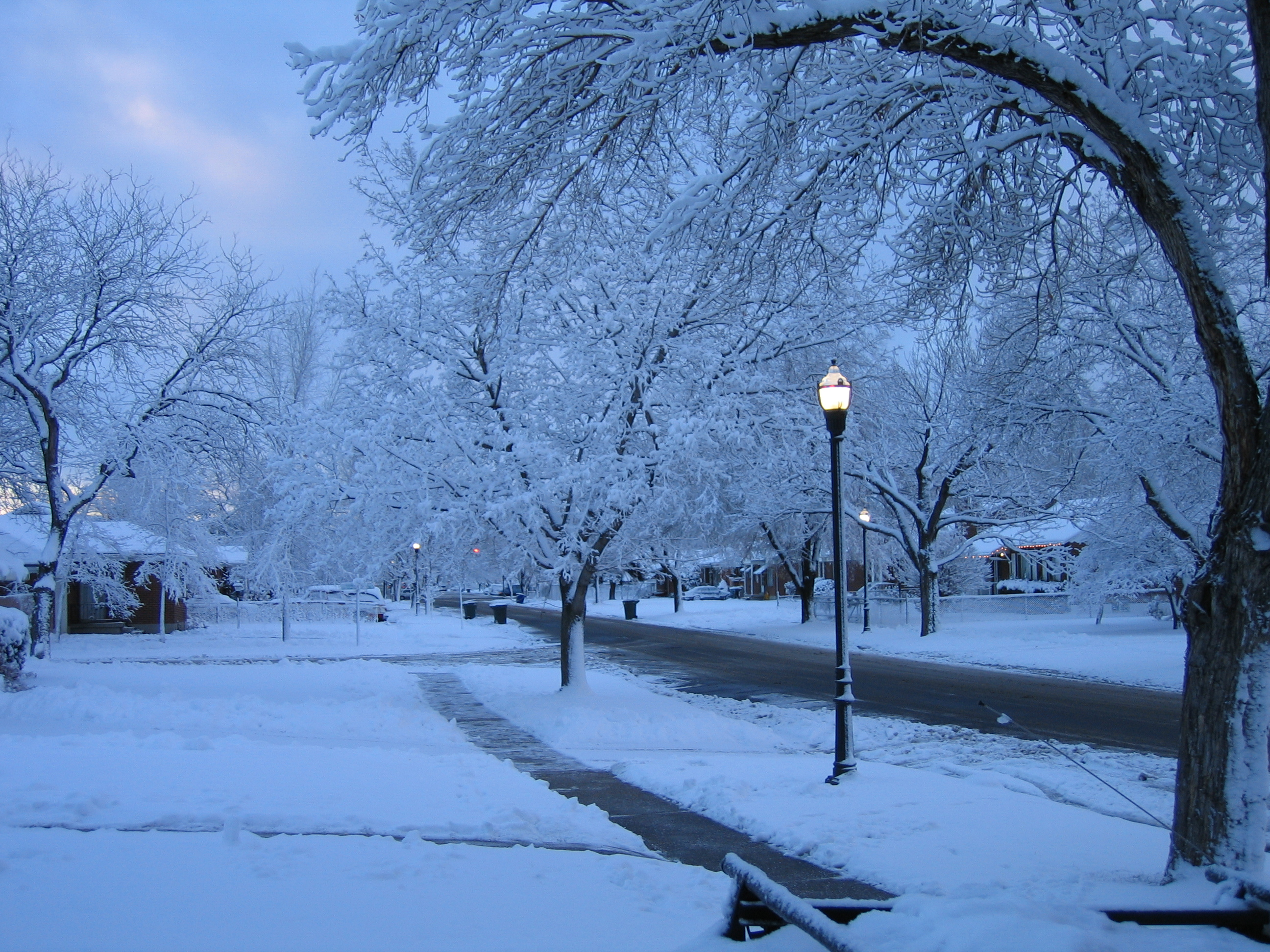
Tree-lined streets after snowfall in Rose Park, 2004.

The first snowfall of the season is usually recorded in October, although significant snowfall usually does not occur until mid-to-late November. However, snow has been recorded in every month of the year in the mountains. Snow fell in the valley as early as September 17 (in 1965). January averages the most snowfall of any month, with 13.6 inches (34.5 cm). Snowfall is common through mid-March, but the last snowfall of the season usually occurs in early or mid-April, although measurable snow has been recorded on the valley floor as late as May 18 (in 1977). However, significant snow can fall in March and in rare cases even April. Measurable snow falls on average from November 6 through April 18.

The airport also averages 61 inches (155 cm) of snow in a year, however, bench locations near the mountains receive substantially more, reaching 80 to 100 in (200 to 255 cm) annually. The four major ski resorts located in canyons surrounding the city regularly average more than 1,300 centimetres (500 in) of snow per year. These high snowfall totals can be credited to the lake effect, in which snow storms passing over the Great Salt Lake are amplified by the warm waters of the lake. The lake effect is usually strongest from mid-fall through mid-winter, when lake waters are warmer and land temperatures are cold enough to support snow.

Blizzards are very rare in the Salt Lake City valley due to a rarity of extreme winds. Although average snowfall is relatively high, large snowstorms of more than about 12 inches (30 cm) are rare in the valley. In addition, average winter temperatures in the city are usually not cold enough to support snow cover all winter long. The maximum snow depth recorded in the city was 26 inches (66 cm) on January 11, 1993. January 1993 was the snowiest month on record, with 50.3 inches (128 cm). The record 24 hour snowfall occurred from February 24–25, 1998, when 18.9 inches (48 cm) fell, while the record single storm snowfall occurred from January 6–10, 1993, with 23.3 inches (59 cm). The snowiest season on record was 1951-1952, when 117.3 inches (298 cm) fell, while the least snowy winter on record was 1939-1940, with 18.5 inches (47.0 cm).

The airport averages around 37 and 97 days of snow and precipitation, respectively, each year. Daily sunshine hours range from a low of 3.6 in December to a high of 12.3 in July, all for a bountiful total of nearly 3030 hours per year.

		Jan	Feb	Mar	Apr	May	Jun	Jul	Aug	Sep	Oct	Nov	Dec
Average Precipitation	in.	1.37	1.33	1.91	2.02	2.09	0.77	0.72	0.76	1.33	1.57	1.40	1.23
Record Precipitation	in.	3.23	4.89	3.97	4.90	4.76	3.84	2.57	3.66	7.04	3.91	3.34	4.37
Average Snowfall	in.	13.6	9.9	9.1	4.9	0.6	0.0	0.0	0.0	0.1	1.3	7.0	12.0
Record Snowfall	in.	50.3	32.1	41.9	26.4	7.5	0.0	0.0	0.0	4.0	20.4	33.3	35.2
Data is for Salt Lake International Airport

== Other weather events ==
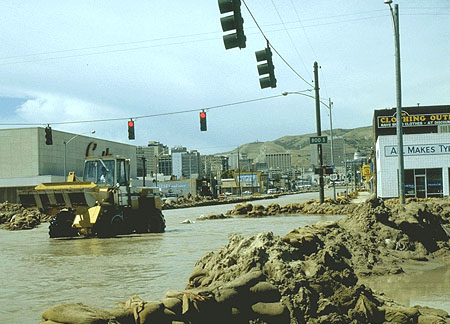
Flood of City Creek, 1983.

The phenomena El Niño and La Niña also affect precipitation along the Great Basin, bringing occasional cycles of drought and flooding. The largest recent flood in Salt Lake City occurred in 1983. Triggered by a powerful El Niño, an exceptionally large snowpack caused flooding and massive damage. City Creek burst from its underground diversion and flooded the city. Some streets, such as State Street and 1300 South, were converted into makeshift rivers to accommodate the overflowing creek. Some flooding also occurred in 1987, when the Great Salt Lake reached its all-time maximum water level. A 2010 study indicates that this record event occurred during an overlapping period of three prominent climate cycles that are unique in the region.

Significant mid-winter temperature inversions often occur in the Salt Lake Valley. These inversions, which often last for days and weeks, are most pronounced in mid-winter, although milder inversions sometimes occur during other seasons. Winter temperature inversions cause cold, foggy and hazy valley conditions, with sunny and somewhat warmer conditions prevailing in the surrounding mountains. Temperature inversions trap valley air pollutants, which often rise to unhealthy levels. Humidity is only high enough and temperatures cold enough for fog to occur during mid-winter, although haze and smog can be found year-round. Inversions occur when strong areas of high pressure remain parked over the Great Basin. It usually takes a cold front to force out or break down the high pressure. Consequently, inversions are rare in spring and fall, when the weather takes on a more progressive pattern, with frequent fronts moving through. Such recurring and persistent patterns of inversions follow a unique timescale of about 30 days, providing a means for long-range weather prediction. Such prediction of persistent inversion up to 30 days has been made operational.

Tornadoes are also relatively uncommon. However, there has been at least one damaging tornado in the city. The Salt Lake City Tornado of August 11, 1999, which killed one person and injured 60, resulted in only the second ever fatality from a tornado in Utah, and caused about $500 million in damage. As a result of extended drought patterns, Salt Lake City constructed several reservoirs to hold excess water during flood periods and provide water during drought conditions. Additionally, artesian wells and water siphoned from Utah Lake miles to the south act as alternate water sources for the city.

== Recent weather events ==
Utah was in a consistent drought from late 1998 through 2004, although experts warn that the drought-breaking conditions experienced in 2004 and 2005 could actually just be a break in a more extended drought pattern. July 2003 set the record for the warmest month ever in Salt Lake City. 2003 overall was the second warmest year on record, and recorded the second-warmest January, August, and October on record, but with the warmest month ever (July). January 2003 saw a record high January temperature of 63 °F (17 °C) and record low January snowfall (a trace). That winter was the sixth warmest and third least snowy on record. May 2003 also set a record high May temperature of 99 °F (37 °C) on two consecutive days. July 2002 also saw a record-tying high temperature of 107 °F (42 °C), while July 2003 saw a record high minimum temperature (80 °F (27 °C)) and a record streak of 100 degree weather (July contributed 10 of that summer's 24 days over 100 degrees).

In late December 2003, a large snowstorm dumped more than 18 inches (46 cm) of snow across the valley, with up to 40 inches (100 cm) in high bench areas and up to 100 inches (250 cm) in the Wasatch Range. From December 25–29, the official station saw 21.9 inches (56 cm). This snowstorm also caused widespread power outages. Accompanied by subsequent snowstorms and a very cold January and February, snow from this storm remained on the ground for the remainder of the winter. From January 3–26, Salt Lake City spent a record amount of time below freezing. January and February were both very cold, but this was followed by the fourth-warmest March on record, which also saw a record-tying March high.

Before 2005, 1998 was the last year to see above-average precipitation. Near record-setting snowpack in the mountains during the 2004 to 2005 season, as well as heavy spring rains, ended the drought nearly statewide. Heavy winter and spring rains caused flooding throughout the state. In late January, heavy rains overflowed the Santa Clara River in Washington County in the southwest corner of the state, destroying several homes in Ivins, Santa Clara, and Saint George, and essentially cutting off the small town of Gunlock. Heavy spring rains in late April caused widespread but minor flooding in northern Utah.

Heat returned in the summer of 2006, with July 2006 becoming the second-hottest July on record. Summer 2006 (June–August) closed as the 4th-hottest on record, tempered only by a near-average August. January 2007 became the coldest month since December 1990, and the coldest January since 1978. April 29, 2007, saw a record April high temperature of 89 °F (32 °C). Snow levels in the ski resorts were near record lows. It became one of the driest springs on record in Salt Lake City.

Heat returned again in the summer of 2007, with July 2007 breaking the aforementioned July 2003 record. July 2007 also set the record for the highest average monthly minimum temperature. December 2007 became the third-wettest on record. Snowfall was also abnormally high throughout the winter of 2007-2008 as snow came at an unusually frequent pace. Snow totals ended only slightly under the totals of 2003-2004 without a major snowstorm to boost the totals. Spring 2008 was once again dry but was very cool. Heat returned that summer once again and July 2008 became the fifth-warmest month on record.
