= List of killings by law enforcement officers in the United States, September 2021 =

This is a list of people reported killed by non-military law enforcement officers in the United States in September 2021, whether in the line of duty or not, and regardless of reason or method. The listing documents the occurrence of a death, making no implications regarding wrongdoing or justification on the part of the person killed or officer involved. Killings are arranged by date of the incident that caused death. Different death dates, if known, are noted in the description. The table below lists 98 people.

== September 2021 ==
Date	Name (age) of deceased	Race	Location	Description
2021-09-30	William Casselman (69)	White	Ogden, Utah	Casselman was struck and killed by a Weber State University police vehicle as he crossed the street.
2021-09-30	Chaz Nathan McGowen (28)	White	Niles Charter Township, Michigan	
2021-09-30	Nicholas Norris (38)	White	San Antonio, Texas	
2021-09-29	Kyle Anthony Veyon (26)	Black	Columbus, Ohio	
2021-09-29	Stephen Phil Franco (37)	Unknown race	Tempe, Arizona	
2021-09-29	Daniel Ledford (41)	White	Middlesboro, Kentucky	
2021-09-28	Brandon Lopez (34)	Hispanic	Santa Ana, California	Police responded to a report Lopez had taken his girlfriend's car without her permission. When Lopez exited the car holding a water bottle in a black bag, police shot him. Police stated officers believed Lopez had a gun.
2021-09-28	Patrick Chin (43)	Asian	Hillsborough, New Jersey	Police were called to Chin's home for a welfare check. An officer shot Chin, who was allegedly holding a three-foot-long sword.
2021-09-28	Leonel Tony Chavez (24)	Hispanic	Los Angeles, California	
2021-09-27	Gloria Marie Strong (27)	Black	Allen, Texas	
2021-09-27	Joseph Arbour (36)	White	Auburn, Maine	
2021-09-27	Nathan Thomas Honeycutt (26)	White	Happy Valley, Oregon	
2021-09-25	Sandra Barajas (32)	Hispanic	Delano, California	
2021-09-25	Christian Smith (33)	Unknown race	Decatur, Georgia	
2021-09-25	Ronnie Andrew Garcia (43)	Hispanic	Huntington Beach, California	
2021-09-25	Luke J. Longeretta (32)	White	Coshocton, Ohio	
2021-09-24	Jessie Leonard (36)	White	Indianapolis, Indiana	
2021-09-24	Cedric "C.J." Lofton (17)	Black	Wichita, Kansas	Police were called by Lofton's foster father to transport him to a mental hospital. After Lofton refused to go with them, officers took Lofton to a juvenile facility. At the facility Lofton struggled with corrections workers, who restrained him, with Lofton falling unconscious and dying. An autopsy declared Lofton's death a homicide due to being restrained.
2021-09-23	Barry Ross (34)	Unknown race	Lancaster, California	
2021-09-23	Paul Bryan Stone (40)	White	McKinney, Texas	
2021-09-23	Barry Heckard (39)	White	Newberry, Florida	
2021-09-23	Desmond Damond Louis (20)	Black	Lake Charles, Louisiana	
2021-09-23	Keith Cole (50)	Black	Senatobia, Mississippi	
2021-09-22	Daisha Vood Reynolds (19)	White	Daniel, Utah	
2021-09-22	Irlin Paz (40)	Hispanic	Chamblee, Georgia	
2021-09-22	Troy Allen Engstrom (48)	White	Mounds View, Minnesota	Engstrom was suspected of firing a gun at someone in a hotel room and then fleeing. Police located him nearby, and when Engstrom fired his handgun at approaching police cars, he was run over and killed by a police SUV "to stop the threat", according to police.
2021-09-21	Brandi Rene Baida (30)	Unknown race	Auburn, New York	
2021-09-21	Trent Leach (30)	White	Las Vegas, Nevada	
2021-09-21	Jose Oyuela-Palma (49)	Hispanic	Henderson, Nevada	
2021-09-21	Brandi Baida (30)	Unknown race	Auburn, New York	
2021-09-20	Phillip Lopez (42)	Hispanic	Signal Hill, California	
2021-09-20	Deon Ledet (30)	Black	Houston, Texas	
2021-09-19	Turell Brown (28)	Black	Chicago, Illinois	
2021-09-18	Jason Husted (47)	White	West Ashley, South Carolina	
2021-09-18	Christopher E. Rush (34)	White	Mahoning Township, Lawrence County, Pennsylvania	
2021-09-18	Joshua Cooper (31)	Black	New York City, New York	
2021-09-18	Unsfored Lewis Thurmond (27)	Black	Smyrna, Georgia	
2021-09-18	Adrian Cameron (47)	Black	Nashville, Tennessee	
2021-09-18	Name Withheld	Unknown race	Ghent, Kentucky	
2021-09-18	Dishawn Sanders	Black	Jackson, Mississippi	
2021-09-17	Jonathan Carroll (38)	White	Escondido, California	
2021-09-17	Matthew Joseph Wilbanks (41)	White	Marietta, Georgia	
2021-09-17	Joshua Castellano (35)	White	Las Vegas, Nevada	
2021-09-16	Andrew Brandon Christian (34)	Unknown race	Memphis, Tennessee	
2021-09-16	Shaine Marie Selph (21)	White	Hawkins, Texas	
2021-09-16	Gabriel Michael Varela (17)	Hispanic	Wichita Falls, Texas	
2021-09-16	Dan Ross Boyd (38)	White	Huntsville, Texas	
2021-09-16	Timothy Grayson (54)	Unknown race	Yazoo City, Mississippi	
2021-09-15	Christopher George (25)	White	Davis, Oklahoma	
2021-09-15	Cody Levi Harrison (33)	White	Independence, Missouri	
2021-09-15	Kenzie Keyes (30)	White	Phoenix, Arizona	Police attempted to arrest a man, Jacob Hernandez, when he and Keyes ran from a pair of officers. After Hernandez shot himself in the head, Keyes allegedly picked up the gun and was shot by police.
2021-09-14	Paul J. Bruner (58)	White	Waukesha, Wisconsin	
2021-09-14	Charles Sharp III (49)	White	Mantua Township, New Jersey	
2021-09-13	Tedman Werito (44)	Native American	Farmington, New Mexico	
2021-09-13	Michael Jonathan Cortez (30)	Hispanic	Oakland, California	
2021-09-13	Robert Parks (39)	Black	Smyrna, Georgia	
2021-09-12	Rodolfo Gonzales (46)	Hispanic	San Antonio, Texas	
2021-09-11	James Anderson (48)	Unknown race	Thompson, Iowa	
2021-09-11	William Frank Hull (31)	White	San Antonio, Texas	
2021-09-11	Desmond Lewis (30)	Black	Shreveport, Louisiana	
2021-09-11	Tristan Vereen (33)	Black	Longs, South Carolina	
2021-09-10	Nicholas Ouellette (16)	White	Bow, New Hampshire	An off-duty officer crashed his car into the rear-end of a truck on Interstate 89, killing his two sons.
2021-09-10	Gavin Thomas Ouellette (6)	White	Bow, New Hampshire	An off-duty officer crashed his car into the rear-end of a truck on Interstate 89, killing his two sons.
2021-09-10	Le'den Boykins (12)	Black	Douglasville, Georgia	Boykins was a passenger in a car driven by a family friend, along with the family friend's son. Police attempted to pull over the vehicle for speeding, which started a chase. The chase ended when police performed a PIT maneuver, causing a crash that killed Boykins. The driver of the car was charged with murder and driving under the influence.
2021-09-10	Jesse B. Lees (33)	White	Topeka, Kansas	
2021-09-10	Cedric Williams (29)	Black	Oxon Hill, Maryland	
2021-09-10	Jessee Rickman (28)	White	Phoenix, Arizona	
2021-09-10	Joseph Manhard (31)	White	Farmington, Utah	
2021-09-09	David Ray Williams (37)	White	Diggins, Missouri	
2021-09-09	Eric H. Liao (30)	Asian	Omaha, Nebraska	
2021-09-09	Christopher Thomas Vaughan (35)	White	Roxboro, North Carolina	
2021-09-09	Charles David Chivrell (35)	White	Arcata, California	
2021-09-08	David Lopez (40)	Hispanic	Gilroy, California	
2021-09-07	Derek Scott Pearson (53)	White	Sacramento, California	
2021-09-07	Name Withheld (31)	Unknown race	Sioux Falls, South Dakota	
2021-09-07	Anthony Cravo (52)	White	Lufkin, Texas	While investigating a report of an armed robbery, an officer asked for one of the alleged victims to come outside of a trailer home and speak. Cravo emerged brandishing a rifle and was shot by the officer.
2021-09-07	Cimmeron Christy (46)	White	Moriarty, New Mexico	
2021-09-07	Craig Allen Knutson (45)	White	New Salem, North Dakota	
2021-09-07	Richard Dee Woods (43)	White	Lufkin, Texas	Officers from the Lufkin Police Department, along with county deputies, attempted to execute a felony arrest warrant. Richard Woods produced a pistol and was shot by police.
2021-09-07	Josue Arias (32)	Black	Clearwater, Florida	
2021-09-06	Robert Gutierrez (59)	Hispanic	Springfield, Oregon	
2021-09-06	Christopher C. Zenittini (35)	Unknown race	Old Fields, West Virginia	
2021-09-05	Frederick Thomas (41)	Black	Miamisburg, Ohio	
2021-09-04	Spencer Allan Clayborn (25)	White	Lakewood, Washington	
2021-09-04	Jorge Calleres (39)	Hispanic	Fresno, California	
2021-09-03	Jose Angel Francisco Baca (28)	Hispanic	Los Lunas, New Mexico	
2021-09-03	Cedric Baxter (60)	Black	Buena Park, California	
2021-09-03	Mark Edward Danley (52)	White	Weston, West Virginia	
2021-09-03	Adam Nickolas Alvarez (37)	Hispanic	Las Cruces, New Mexico	
2021-09-03	David Marshall (31)	White	Franklin, Milwaukee County, Wisconsin	
2021-09-03	Drew Lucero (37)	Unknown race	Denver, Colorado	
2021-09-03	Estevan Ramirez (18)	Hispanic	Fort Worth, Texas	
2021-09-03	Lisa Bernadette Garcia (52)	Hispanic	Denver, Colorado	
2021-09-02	Christopher Derby (33)	White	Arvada, Colorado	
2021-09-01	James Williams (33)	Black	Indianapolis, Indiana	
2021-09-01	Anne Marie Schilly (65)	White	Metairie, Louisiana	
2021-09-01	Omar Hernandez (39)	Hispanic	Houston, Texas	
2021-09-01	Conor Riley McDaniel (26)	White	Peyton, Colorado	

== See also ==
- Death in custody § United States
- Henry A. Wallace Police Crime Public Database
- List of cases of police brutality
- List of countries with annual rates and counts for killings by law enforcement officers
- List of law enforcement officers killed in the line of duty in the United States
- List of law enforcement officers convicted for an on-duty killing in the United States
- List of shootings by US immigration agents
- List of police reforms related to the George Floyd protests
- List of unarmed African Americans killed by law enforcement officers in the United States
- Lists of killings by law enforcement officers
- Police brutality in the United States
- Police misconduct § United States
- Police riot § United States
- Police use of deadly force in the United States
