= Center Creek, Utah =

Unincorporated community in the state of Utah, United States

- Unincorporated community
- Location within Utah Location within the United States
- Coordinates: 40°28′41″N 111°21′26″W
- Country: United States
- State: Utah
- County: Wasatch
- Elevation: 5,932 ft (1,808 m)
- Time zone: UTC-7 (Mountain (MST))
  - Summer (DST): UTC-6 (MDT)
- Area code: 435
- GNIS feature ID: 1439607

Center Creek is an unincorporated community in Wasatch County, Utah, United States. The community is 3.5 miles (5.6 km) southeast of Heber City.
