= 2003 Utah snowstorm =

Weather event in Utah, United States

Meteorological history
- Formed: December 25, 2003
- Dissipated: December 31, 2003

Overall effects
- Fatalities: 5
- Damage: $1,820,000
- Areas affected: Utah

The 2003 Utah snowstorm was a major snowstorm that affected the U.S. state of Utah during December 25–31, 2003. Many areas of Utah were paralyzed by up to 4 feet (1.2 m) of snow. The Wasatch Front from the Salt Lake Valley northward saw generally 1–3 feet of snow (30–90 cm), with up to four feet on the benches, while the surrounding mountains generally saw 5–7 feet of snow (1.5–2 m), with up to nine feet in some areas. The storm even reached southern Utah with moderate snow amounts, with a few inches in some low-lying valley locations. At least five deaths were attributed to the heavy snow.

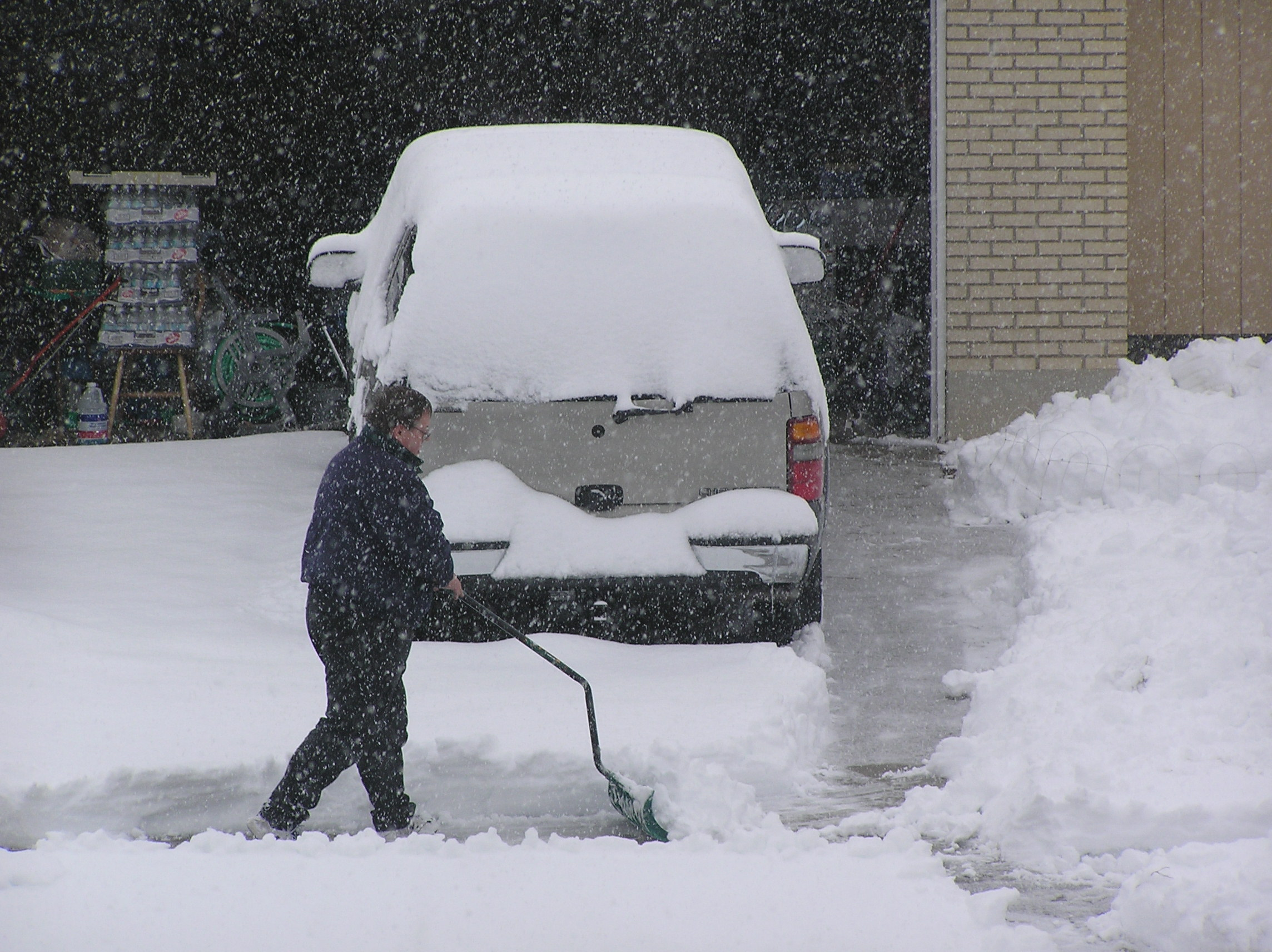
Clearing a driveway during the storm.

The Salt Lake City airport saw 21.9 inches (56 cm) of snow. The 19.4 inches (49 cm) of snow that fell during December 25–28, in the first wave of the storm, ranks as the 5th-largest storm in Salt Lake City history. The most snow along the Wasatch Front was recorded on the Layton bench in Davis County, which saw 51 inches (130 cm). Davis and Weber Counties were perhaps the hardest-hit areas, with even valley locations recording over 2 and as much as 3 feet (60–90 cm) in places. Bountiful, typically one of the areas hardest hit by lake-effect snows, saw 32 inches (81 cm), Clearfield 28 in (71 cm), and Ogden 36 in (91 cm). The storm also affected areas further north, including Brigham City with 19 inches (48 cm) and Logan with 18 inches. Areas along the southern Wasatch Front saw less snow, with just six inches (15 cm) in Provo, although Spanish Fork saw 17 inches (43 cm), due to lake effect snows from Utah Lake, which Spanish Fork is frequently in the path of. The Wasatch Back also saw significant amounts of snow, with 50 inches (130 cm) in Summit Park, near the summit of Parley's Canyon and just a few miles northwest of Park City.

The Wasatch Mountains saw near-record amounts of snow. Farmington Canyon in Davis County saw the most snow of any place in the storm, with 103 inches (260 cm) of snow. The ski resorts of Salt Lake County saw several feet of snow as well, with some skiers reporting "epic ski conditions." Alta saw 87 inches (220 cm) of snow, Snowbird had 82 inches (210 cm), Brighton 66 inches (170 cm), and Nordic Valley 51 inches (130 cm).

Unusual for such a storm, this massive snowstorm even penetrated into southern Utah, dropping moderate amounts across the south. The Brian Head ski resort saw 40 inches (100 cm) to top off mountain locations, while even low valley locations saw snow, including Kanab with seven inches (18 cm), and Hurricane with two inches (5.1 cm), just a few hundred feet (~100 m) higher and a few miles east of Saint George.

Of the five people killed in the storm, an avalanche on the east side of Mount Timpanogos killed three snowboarders on December 26, while traffic accidents killed two people on December 28. In addition, at least one million people along the Wasatch Front lost power just on the first day of the storm, and at least 2,000 traffic accidents were reported (most of them along the Wasatch Front). In total, the storm caused at least $3.82 million in damage. Utah Power (now Rocky Mountain Power) faced criticism from residents and even the Salt Lake City council on the speed and effectiveness of electricity restoration to the area after more than 300 customers were still without power 20 days after the storm.
