= Independence, Utah =

Town in Wasatch County, Utah, United States

Independence
- Town
- Location in Wasatch County and the State of Utah
- Coordinates: 40°23′37″N 111°17′32″W
- Country: United States
- State: Utah
- County: Wasatch
- Incorporated: June 5, 2008
- Founder: Melvin McQuarrie

Area
  - Total: 30.55 sq mi (79.12 km^{2})
  - Land: 30.55 sq mi (79.12 km^{2})
  - Water: 0 sq mi (0.00 km^{2})
- Elevation: 7,943 ft (2,421 m)

Population (2020)
  - Total: 121
  - Density: 6.5/sq mi (2.5/km^{2})
- Time zone: UTC-7 (Mountain (MST))
  - Summer (DST): UTC-6 (MDT)
- ZIP code: 84032
- Area code: 435
- GNIS feature ID: 2547778
- Website: www.independenceut.gov

Independence is a town in Wasatch County, Utah, United States. Lying just east of U.S. Route 40 southeast of Heber City, Independence was incorporated in 2008 under a controversial, short-lived state law. The population was 121 at the 2020 census.

== Geography ==
Independence is a sparsely populated rural community in Daniel's Canyon in the Wasatch Mountains. It consists of farmland and wooded mountain slopes. Just to the southeast of the young town of Daniel, Independence lies on a popular recreational corridor between Heber City and Strawberry Reservoir.

== History ==
In 2007, the Utah State Legislature unanimously passed H.B. 466, a bill that amended the state law on petitions to incorporate a town. The new provisions allowed a petition for a new town with 100–999 residents to be filed with just the signatures of the owners of a majority of the land area, even a single majority landowner. If the petition met the conditions of state law and its signers owned the majority of the land by value, the new law required the county government to grant the petition and appoint a mayor and town council from a list of individuals approved by the petitioners. In July 2007 Ruby's Inn, in Garfield County, became the first to take advantage of the law, incorporating as Bryce Canyon City.

A group of Wasatch County landowners led by developer Mel McQuarrie filed the first petition to incorporate Independence on October 12, 2007, but county officials denied it for an incomplete land survey. Some residents who would have been included in the original boundaries of the proposed town petitioned to be annexed into nearby Daniel, rather than be included in Independence. The incorporation petitioners re-filed on December 17, 2007.

In its review of the second petition, the Wasatch County Council allowed some potential Independence residents to opt out of the proposal on February 6, 2008, then denied incorporation again on February 13, 2008, this time for insufficient population.

By March 2008, the legislature had amended the law again, unanimously passing H.B. 164, which required a petition for incorporation to have the support of half the residents, and provided for an elected mayor and town council. There must also be at least five petition sponsors, who were not allowed themselves to own more than 40 percent of the land. An effort to make the new law retroactive failed, and petitions filed under H.B. 466 went forward. Among those grandfathered in were the third Independence petition, which had been filed just before the repeal, as well as pending requests for the town of Hideout, also in Wasatch County, and Powder Mountain in Weber County.

The Wasatch County Council finally granted the petition to incorporate Independence on April 2, 2008.

== Demographics ==
Historical population
Census	Pop.	Note	%±
2010	164		—
2020	121		−26.2%
U.S. Decennial Census

At Independence's incorporation, the Utah Population Estimates Committee produced an official population estimate of 117. Many of the residents live on land that has been in their families for generations.

As of the census of 2010, there were 164 people living in the town. There were 66 housing units. The racial makeup of the town was 98.2% White, 0.6% Asian, 0.6% from some other race, and 0.6% from two or more races. Hispanic or Latino of any race were 9.8% of the population.

== See also ==
- List of municipalities in Utah
