= Timber Lakes, Utah =

- CDP
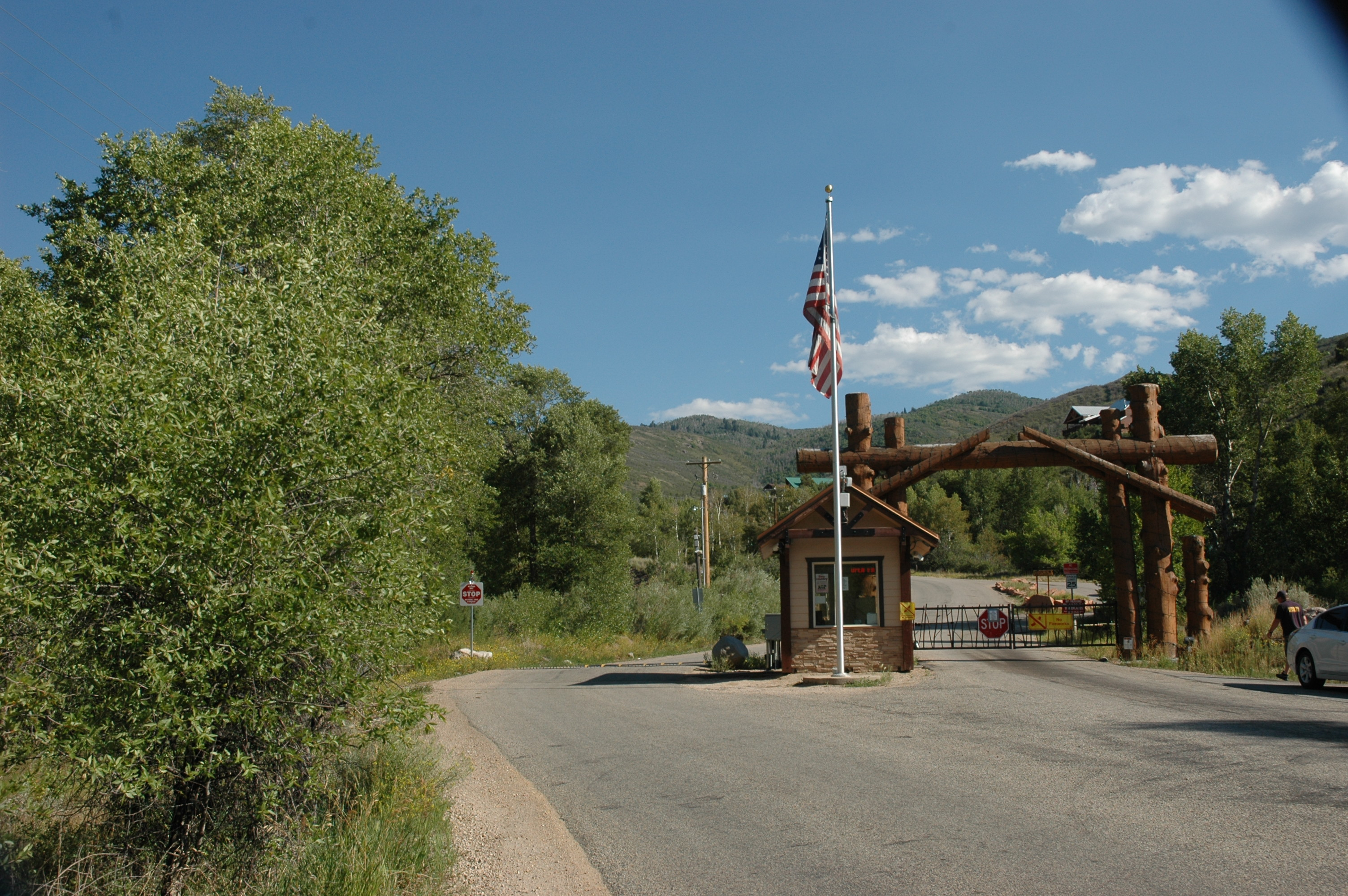
- Entrance gate

- Location in Wasatch County and the state of Utah
- Coordinates: 40°28′05″N 111°14′48″W
- Country: United States
- State: Utah
- County: Wasatch

Area
  - Total: 2.8 sq mi (7.2 km^{2})
  - Land: 2.7 sq mi (7.0 km^{2})
  - Water: 0.077 sq mi (0.2 km^{2})
- Elevation: 7,763 ft (2,366 m)

Population (2020)
  - Total: 866
  - Density: 320/sq mi (120/km^{2})
- Time zone: UTC-7 (Mountain (MST))
  - Summer (DST): UTC-6 (MDT)
- ZIP code: 84032
- Area code: 435
- FIPS code: 49-76280
- GNIS feature ID: 2409322

Timber Lakes is a census-designated place (CDP) in Wasatch County, Utah, United States. The population was 866 at the 2020 census, up from 607 in 2010.

== Geography ==
According to the United States Census Bureau, the CDP has a total area of 2.8 square miles (7.3 km^{2}), of which 2.7 square miles (7.0 km^{2}) is land and 0.1 square miles (0.26 km^{2}) (3.58%) is water. Timber Lakes is a private gated community in the mountains east of Heber City.

== Demographics ==
Historical population
Census	Pop.	Note	%±
2000	289		—
2010	607		110.0%
2020	866		42.7%

As of the census of 2000, there were 289 people, 108 households, and 81 families residing in the CDP. The population density was 107.2 people per square mile (41.4/km^{2}). There were 485 housing units at an average density of 179.8/sq mi (69.4/km^{2}). The racial makeup of the CDP was 97.92% White, 1.04% African American, 0.69% Native American and 0.35% Asian. Hispanic or Latino of any race were 4.50% of the population.

There were 108 households, out of which 33.3% had children under the age of 18 living with them, 71.3% were married couples living together, 2.8% had a female householder with no husband present, and 24.1% were non-families. 14.8% of all households were made up of individuals, and 0.9% had someone living alone who was 65 years of age or older. The average household size was 2.68 and the average family size was 3.06.

In the CDP, the population was spread out, with 27.7% under the age of 18, 3.8% from 18 to 24, 40.1% from 25 to 44, 23.5% from 45 to 64, and 4.8% who were 65 years of age or older. The median age was 34 years. For every 100 females, there were 118.9 males. For every 100 females age 18 and over, there were 117.7 males.

The median income for a household in the CDP was $55,208, and the median income for a family was $60,395. Males had a median income of $44,286 versus $30,625 for females. The per capita income for the CDP was $22,214. None of the families and 3.0% of the population were living below the poverty line, including no under eighteens and 42.9% of those over 64.

== See also ==
- List of census-designated places in Utah
