= Charleston, Utah =

- Town
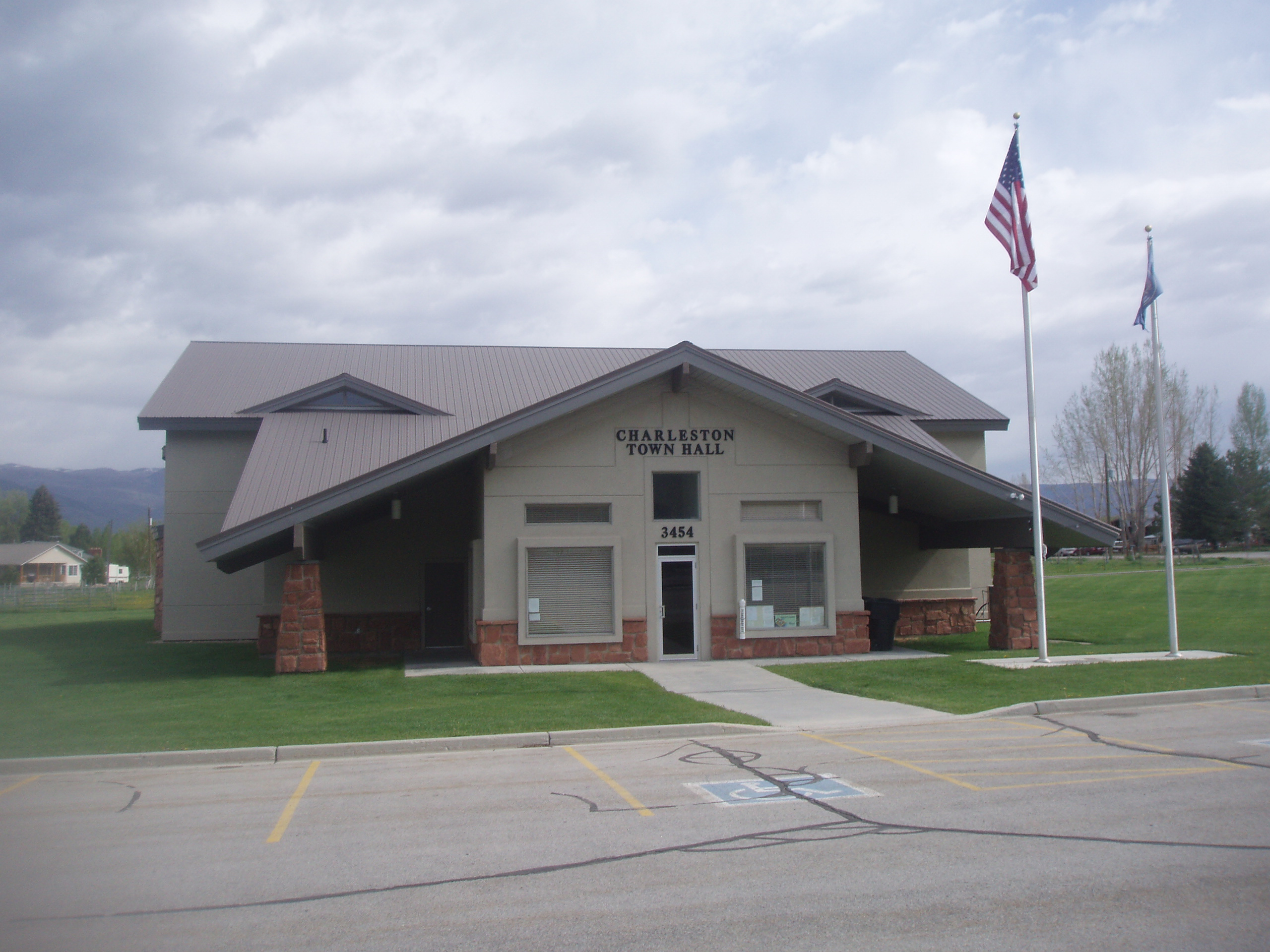
- Charleston Town Hall

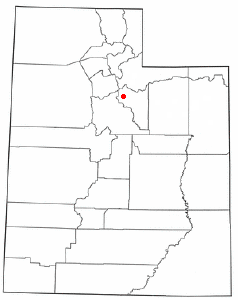
- Location of Charleston, Utah
- Coordinates: 40°27′58″N 111°27′36″W
- Country: United States
- State: Utah
- County: Wasatch
- Settled: 1858
- Founder: Aaron Daniels
- Named for: Charles Shelton

Area
  - Total: 3.07 sq mi (7.95 km^{2})
  - Land: 2.86 sq mi (7.41 km^{2})
  - Water: 0.21 sq mi (0.54 km^{2})
- Elevation: 5,489 ft (1,673 m)

Population (2020)
  - Total: 436
  - Density: 170.1/sq mi (65.68/km^{2})
- Time zone: UTC-7 (Mountain (MST))
  - Summer (DST): UTC-6 (MDT)
- ZIP code: 84032
- Area code: 435
- FIPS code: 49-12420
- GNIS feature ID: 2413190
- Website: charlestontown.utah.gov

Charleston is a town in Wasatch County, Utah, United States. The population was 436 at the 2020 census.

The community was named after Charles Shelton, a first settler.

== Geography ==
According to the United States Census Bureau, the town has a total area of 1.9 square miles (4.9 km^{2}), of which 1.7 square miles (4.4 km^{2}) is land, and 0.2 square miles (0.52 km^{2}), or 10.16%, is water.

== History ==
In 1858, trapper Aaron Daniels moved to a place on the Provo River just north of where Charleston is today.

The first farmers put in crops at Charleston in 1859, and the first houses were built by George Noakes and William Manning late that year near Noakes springs. Manning and George Noakes were the only residents until 1863 when a few others moved in. In 1866, there were about a dozen families, and after that, the population began to grow even faster.

Noakes was the first Presiding elder in Charleston. Until 1877, the branch was part of the Heber Ward. The Charleston Ward was formed in July 1877, with Nymphus C. Murdock as bishop. The ward had 397 members in 1930, with 467 people living within the ward boundaries.

== Demographics ==
Historical population
Census	Pop.	Note	%±
1880	246		—
1890	501		103.7%
1900	490		−2.2%
1910	524		6.9%
1920	361		−31.1%
1930	343		−5.0%
1940	323		−5.8%
1950	201		−37.8%
1960	223		10.9%
1970	196		−12.1%
1980	320		63.3%
1990	336		5.0%
2000	378		12.5%
2010	415		9.8%
2020	436		5.1%
U.S. Decennial Census

As of the census of 2000, there were 378 people, 120 households, and 101 families residing in the town. The population density was 225.5 people per square mile (87.1/km^{2}). There were 131 housing units at an average density of 78.2 per square mile (30.2/km^{2}). The racial makeup of the town was 97.88% White, 0.26% African American, and 1.85% from two or more races. Hispanic or Latino of any race were 5.03% of the population.

There were 120 households, out of which 48.3% had children under the age of 18 living with them, 75.0% were married couples living together, 7.5% had a female householder with no husband present, and 15.8% were non-families. Of all households 12.5% were made up of individuals, and 4.2% had someone living alone who was 65 years of age or older. The average household size was 3.15 and the average family size was 3.49.

In the town, the population was spread out, with 33.9% under the age of 18, 7.7% from 18 to 24, 23.5% from 25 to 44, 24.1% from 45 to 64, and 10.8% who were 65 years of age or older. The median age was 37 years. For every 100 females, there were 98.9 males. For every 100 females age 18 and over, there were 96.9 males.

The median income for a household in the town was $42,813, and the median income for a family was $44,063. Males had a median income of $40,125 versus $24,167 for females. The per capita income for the town was $21,836. About 2.2% of families and 3.1% of the population were below the poverty line, including 4.2% of those under age 18 and 3.6% of those age 65 or over.
