= Hideout, Utah =

Town in the state of Utah, United States

Hideout
- Town
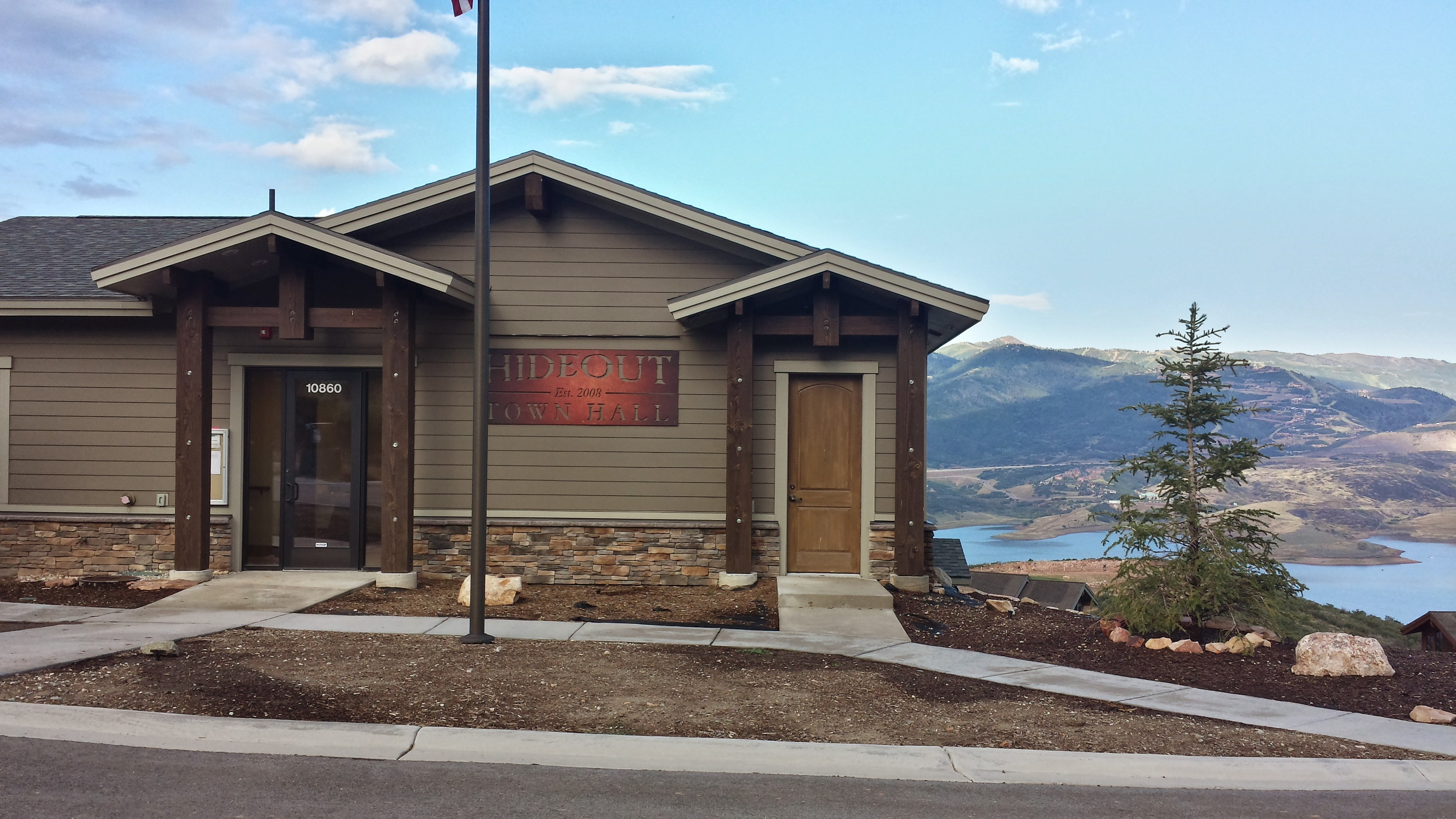
- Hideout Town Hall, August 2014

- Location in Wasatch County and the state of Utah
- Coordinates: 40°38′20″N 111°24′27″W
- Country: United States
- State: Utah
- County: Wasatch
- Incorporated: July 22, 2008
- Founder: Richard Sprung
- Named for: Hideout Canyon

Government

Area
  - Total: 4.06 sq mi (10.52 km^{2})
  - Land: 3.48 sq mi (9.02 km^{2})
  - Water: 0.58 sq mi (1.50 km^{2})
- Elevation: 6,378 ft (1,944 m)

Population (2020)
  - Total: 922
  - Density: 286.5/sq mi (110.61/km^{2})
- Time zone: UTC-7 (Mountain (MST))
  - Summer (DST): UTC-6 (MDT)
- ZIP code: 84036
- Area code: 435
- GNIS feature ID: 2519168

Hideout is a town in the northwestern corner of Wasatch County, Utah, United States, in the northern part of the state. Lying just to the north and east of Jordanelle Reservoir along Utah State Route 248 (SR-248), the town was incorporated in 2008 under short-lived state law. The population was 922 at the 2020 census.

== Geography ==
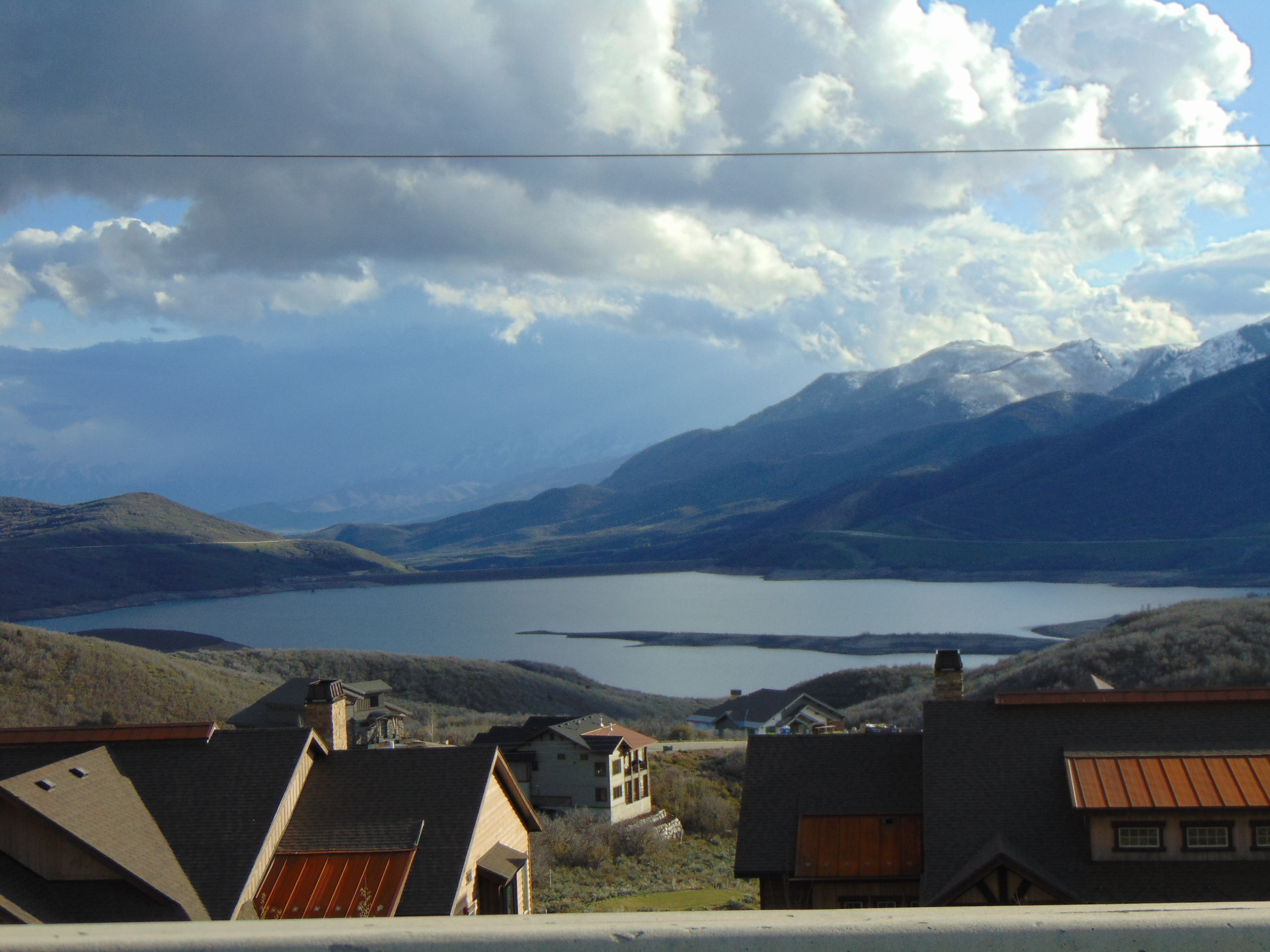
Looking south at the Jordanelle Reservoir from Utah State Route 248 in Hideout, April 2016

Hideout lies about 6 miles (9.7 km) east-southeast of Park City, in an area of the Wasatch Mountains known for its ski resorts and other upscale recreation. The Hideout town boundaries extend from the Todd Hollow Apartments, at the northernmost point of Jordanelle Reservoir, south and east along SR-248, running past the submerged ruins of the ghost town of Keetley. It stops just at the Summit County line, some 4 miles (6.4 km) west-southwest of Kamas. The town includes the luxury planned communities of Hideout Canyon and Soaring Hawk, both still under development.

=== Climate ===
Large seasonal temperature differences typify this climatic region, with warm to hot summers and cold (sometimes severely cold) winters. According to Weather.com, Hideout experiences an average daytime high temperature of 87 degrees in July. The highest recorded temperature was 101 °F in 2002. December is the average coolest month. The lowest recorded temperature was -31 °F in 1990. October is the average wettest month, with 1.76 inches of precipitation.

== History ==
In 2005, Mustang Development Company and Wasatch County entered into a development agreement to develop Hideout Canyon. In 2007, Mustang successfully lobbied the Utah State Legislature to pass H.B. 466. This bill, backed by the Utah League of Cities and Towns and passed unanimously by the legislature, amended the state law on petitions to incorporate a town. The new provisions allowed a petition for a new town with 100–999 residents to be filed with just the signatures of the owners of a majority of the land area, even a single majority landowner. There was no requirement to ask the residents' consent. If the petition met the conditions of state law and its signers owned the majority of the land by value, the new law required the county government to grant the petition and appoint a mayor and town council from a list of individuals approved by the petitioners. In July 2007, Ruby's Inn, in Garfield County, became the first to take advantage of the new law, incorporating as Bryce Canyon City. A petition to incorporate Hideout was filed in November 2007 by Richard Sprung, a real estate agent for Hideout Canyon. By then two other such petitions were pending in Wasatch County: Aspen (ultimately unsuccessful) and Independence.

In February 2008, the Wasatch County Council voted to allow the Todd Hollow Apartments, home to the vast majority of the proposed town's population, to opt-out of the incorporation plan, citing a state law permitting "non-urban" properties to opt-out. The council then denied the petition for insufficient population. By March 2008, the legislature had amended the law again, unanimously passing H.B. 164, which required a petition for incorporation to have the support of half the residents, and provided for an elected mayor and town council. There must also be at least five petition sponsors who were not allowed to own more than 40 percent of the land. An effort to make the new law retroactive failed, and petitions filed under H.B. 466 went forward. Sprung sued in state court, insisting that Todd Hollow was urban. The court ruled in Sprung's favor, ordering the county to grant the petition. The County Council voted to grant Hideout incorporation in June 2008.

== Demographics ==
Historical population
Census	Pop.	Note	%±
2010	656		—
2020	922		40.5%
U.S. Decennial Census

At Hideout's incorporation, the Utah Population Estimates Committee produced an official population estimate of 820. Most of the town's residents live in the Todd Hollow Apartments, with luxury homes scattered between Todd Hollow and the Hideout Canyon development.

As of the census of 2010, 656 people were living in the town. The racial makeup of the town was 46.0% White, 1.1% Black or African American, 0.2% American Indian and Alaska Native, 0.5% Asian, 51.5% from some other race, and 0.8% from two or more races. Hispanic or Latino of any race were 77.0% of the population, making Hideout one of two Utah municipalities (along with Wendover) that are "majority minority". There were 217 housing units, of which 191 were occupied. Only six units, with 16 residents, or 2.4% of the population, were owner-occupied.

In the 2017 election for Hideout town council, 177 votes were cast.

== See also ==
- List of cities and towns in Utah
