= Interlaken, Utah =

Town in Wasatch County, Utah, United States

- Town
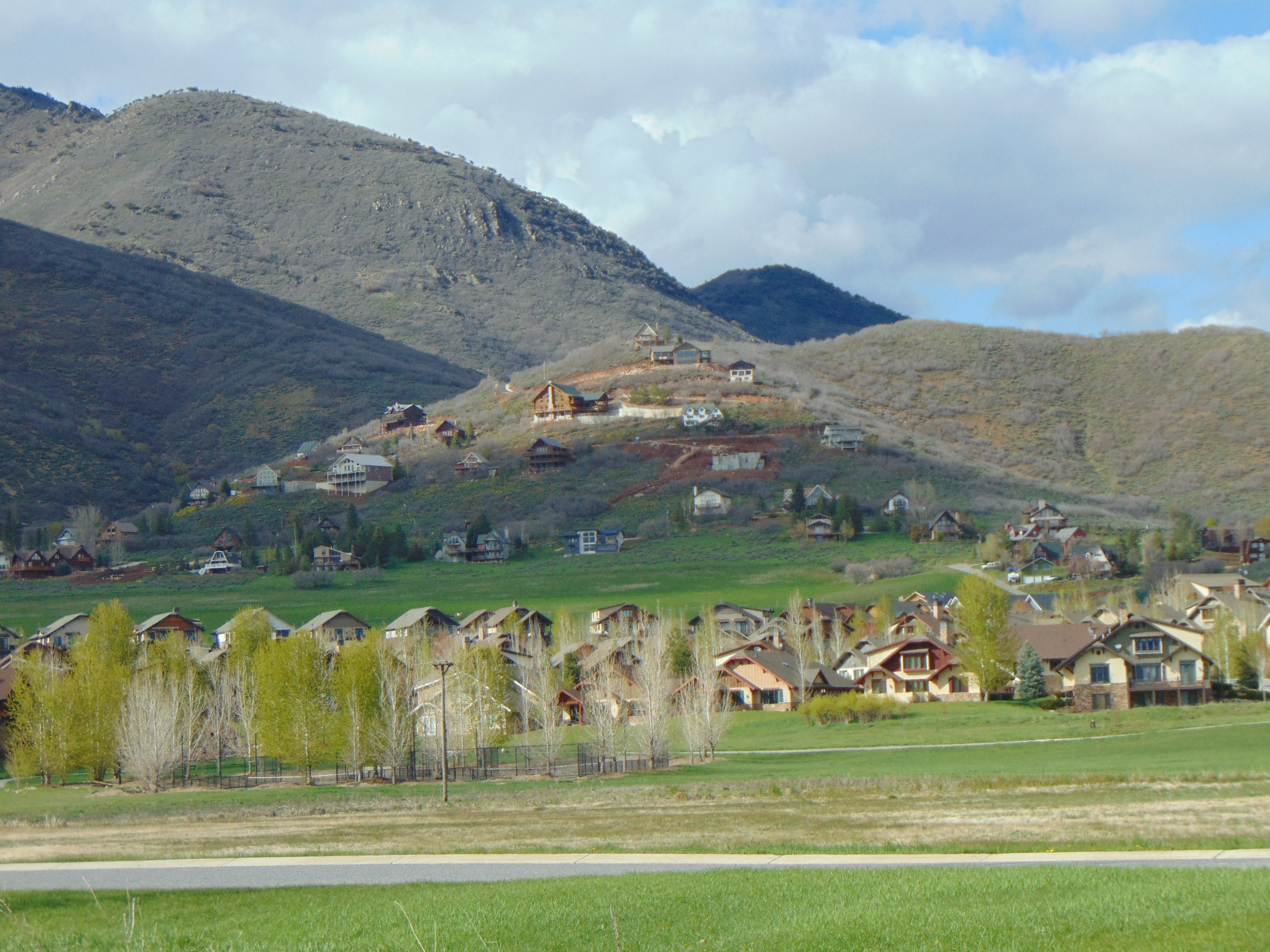
- North from Midway at Donkey Ridge in Interlaken, April 2015

- Town logo

- Location within Utah Location within the United States
- Coordinates: 40°32′28″N 111°28′31″W
- Country: United States
- State: Utah
- County: Wasatch
- Incorporated: May 20, 2015

Government
  - Type: Mayor–council
  - Mayor: Greg Harrigan

Area
  - Total: 0.22 sq mi (0.58 km^{2})
  - Land: 0.22 sq mi (0.58 km^{2})
  - Water: 0 sq mi (0.00 km^{2})
- Elevation: 5,925 ft (1,806 m)

Population (2020)
  - Total: 179
  - Density: 1,051.8/sq mi (406.12/km^{2})
- Time zone: UTC-7 (Mountain [MST])
  - Summer (DST): UTC-6 (MDT)
- ZIP code: 84049
- Area code: 435
- FIPS code: 49-37924
- GNIS feature ID: 2783907
- Website: www.interlakenut.gov

Interlaken is a town in northwestern Wasatch County, Utah, United States. The population was 179 at the 2020 census.

== Geography ==
The entire town is situated on the foothills in northwestern Heber Valley. It is surrounded on three sides (west, north, and east) by the Wasatch Mountain State Park. On the south is the city of Midway, which provides the only access to the town via either Canyon View Road (North 220 West) or Interlaken Drive (the latter of which was originally the only access road to Interlaken). According to the United States Census Bureau, the town has a total area of 0.223 square miles (0.58 km^{2}), all land.

== History ==
The community began as a housing development in unincorporated Wasatch County that was known as Interlaken Estates. The town was officially incorporated on May 20, 2015.

== Demographics ==
Historical population
Census	Pop.	Note	%±
2020	179		—
U.S. Decennial Census

== See also ==
- List of municipalities in Utah
