= Wasatch County, Utah =

County in Utah, United States

- County
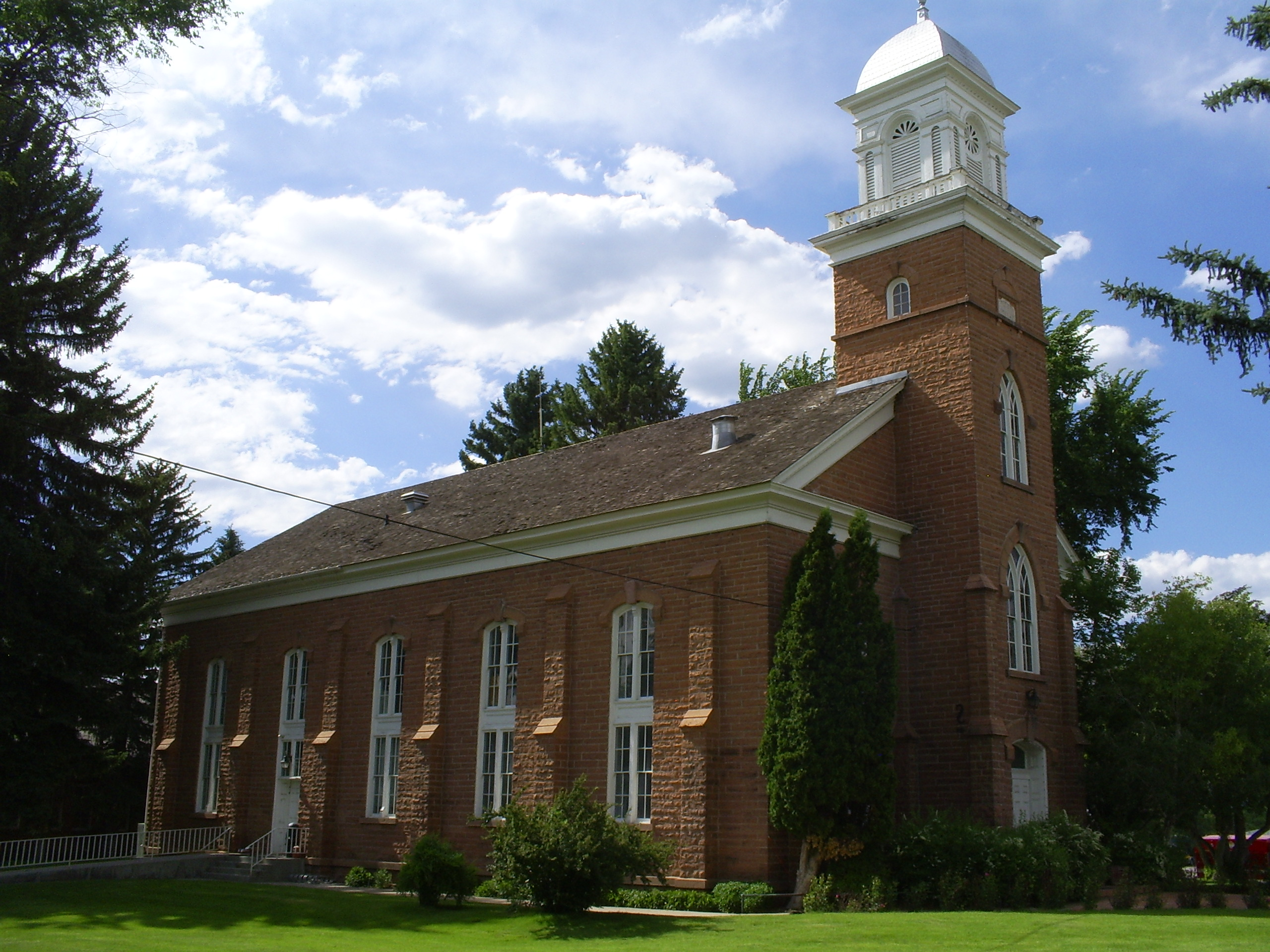
- Wasatch Stake Tabernacle in Heber City.

- Seal Logo

- Location within the U.S. state of Utah
- Coordinates: 40°20′N 111°10′W
- Country: United States
- State: Utah
- Founded: 1862
- Named for: Ute word for mountain pass
- Seat: Heber City
- Largest city: Heber City

Area
  - Total: 1,206 sq mi (3,120 km^{2})
  - Land: 1,176 sq mi (3,050 km^{2})
  - Water: 30 sq mi (78 km^{2}) 2.5%

Population (2020)
  - Total: 34,788
  - Estimate (2025): 38,514 ▲
  - Density: 29.58/sq mi (11.42/km^{2})
- Time zone: UTC−7 (Mountain)
  - Summer (DST): UTC−6 (MDT)
- Congressional district: 3rd
- Website: www.wasatchcounty.gov

Wasatch County (/ˈwɑːsætʃ/ WAH-satch) is a county in the U.S. state of Utah. As of the 2020 United States census, the population was 34,788. Its county seat and largest city is Heber City. The county was named for a Ute word meaning "mountain pass" or "low place in the high mountains".

Wasatch County is part of the Heber, UT Micropolitan Statistical Area as well as the Salt Lake City–Provo–Orem, UT Combined Statistical Area.

== History ==
The first settlers were Mormon pioneers, in 1859, settling near present Heber City, Midway, and Charleston. On January 17, 1862, the Utah Territory legislature created the county, annexing areas from Great Salt Lake, Green River, Sanpete, Summit, and Utah counties. Heber was selected as the county seat. Wasatch in Ute means "mountain pass" or "low pass over high range". Heber City was named for Mormon Apostle Heber C. Kimball. The county boundaries were altered in 1880 and 1884, and then on January 4, 1915, the eastern portion was partitioned off to become Duchesne County. The Wasatch County boundaries have remained unchanged since 1915.

== Geography ==
Heber Valley has a relatively cool climate since it is mountain-ringed, and over half the land is 7,500 feet (2,300 metres) above sea level. The average annual precipitation is about 16 inches (410 millimetres). The county is divided into two watersheds—the Colorado and the Great Basin drainage systems. Flowing from the East are Daniels, Lake Fork, and Center creeks. From the north and northeast is the Provo River. Flowing from the west is Snake Creek. The county's highest point is the west slope of Murdock Mountain in the Uinta Mountains, at 10,840 ft (3,300 m) ASL.

Wasatch County has a total area of 1,206 square miles (3,120 km^{2}), of which 1,176 square miles (3,050 km^{2}) is land and 30 square miles (78 km^{2}) (2.5%) is water.

=== Major highways ===
- U.S. Route 6
- U.S. Route 40
- U.S. Route 189
- Utah State Route 32
- Utah State Route 35
- Utah State Route 113
- Utah State Route 248
- Utah State Route 319

=== Adjacent counties ===
- Salt Lake County - northwest
- Summit County - north
- Duchesne County - east
- Utah County - southwest

=== Protected areas ===
- Ashley National Forest (part)
- Currant Creek Campground (USFS)
- Currant Creek Wildlife Management Area (part)
- Deer Creek State Park
- Rock Cliff Campground (Utah State Park)
- Soldier Creek Recreational Area
- Uinta National Forest (part)
- Wasatch Mountain State Park
- Wasatch National Forest (part)
- Wildcat Mountain Wildlife Management Area

=== Lakes ===
- Currant Creek Reservoir
- Deer Creek Reservoir
- Jordanelle Reservoir
- Strawberry Reservoir
- Witts Lake

== Demographics ==
Historical population
Census	Pop.	Note	%±
1870	1,244		—
1880	2,927		135.3%
1890	3,595		22.8%
1900	4,786		33.1%
1910	8,920		86.4%
1920	4,625		−48.2%
1930	5,636		21.9%
1940	5,754		2.1%
1950	5,574		−3.1%
1960	5,308		−4.8%
1970	5,863		10.5%
1980	8,523		45.4%
1990	10,089		18.4%
2000	15,215		50.8%
2010	23,530		54.7%
2020	34,788		47.8%
2025 (est.)	38,514	▲	10.7%
US Decennial Census; 1790–1960 1900–1990; 1990–2000 2010 2020

=== 2020 census ===
According to the 2020 United States census and 2020 American Community Survey, there were 34,788 people in Wasatch County with a population density of 29.6 people per square mile (11.4/km^{2}). Among non-Hispanic or Latino people, the racial makeup was 28,168 (81.0%) White, 141 (0.4%) African American, 67 (0.2%) Native American, 347 (1.0%) Asian, 41 (0.1%) Pacific Islander, 65 (0.2%) from other races, and 913 (2.6%) from two or more races. 5,046 (14.5%) people were Hispanic or Latino.

Wasatch County, Utah – Racial and ethnic composition Note: the US Census treats Hispanic/Latino as an ethnic category. This table excludes Latinos from the racial categories and assigns them to a separate category. Hispanics/Latinos may be of any race.
Race / Ethnicity (NH = Non-Hispanic)	Pop 2000	Pop 2010	Pop 2020	% 2000	% 2010	% 2020
White alone (NH)	14,188	19,818	28,168	93.25%	84.22%	80.97%
Black or African American alone (NH)	32	49	141	0.21%	0.21%	0.41%
Native American or Alaska Native alone (NH)	59	52	67	0.39%	0.22%	0.19%
Asian alone (NH)	44	168	347	0.29%	0.71%	1.00%
Pacific Islander alone (NH)	15	24	41	0.10%	0.10%	0.12%
Other race alone (NH)	2	14	65	0.01%	0.06%	0.19%
Mixed race or Multiracial (NH)	100	221	913	0.66%	0.94%	2.62%
Hispanic or Latino (any race)	775	3,184	5,046	5.09%	13.53%	14.51%
Total	15,215	23,530	34,788	100.00%	100.00%	100.00%

There were 17,665 (50.78%) males and 17,123 (49.22%) females, and the population distribution by age was 10,578 (30.4%) under the age of 18, 19,617 (56.4%) from 18 to 64, and 4,593 (13.2%) who were at least 65 years old. The median age was 35.3 years.

There were 11,040 households in Wasatch County with an average size of 3.15 of which 8,770 (79.4%) were families and 2,270 (20.6%) were non-families. Among all families, 7,325 (66.3%) were married couples, 543 (4.9%) were male householders with no spouse, and 902 (8.2%) were female householders with no spouse. Among all non-families, 1,772 (16.1%) were a single person living alone and 498 (4.5%) were two or more people living together. 4,578 (41.5%) of all households had children under the age of 18. 8,421 (76.3%) of households were owner-occupied while 2,619 (23.7%) were renter-occupied.

The median income for a Wasatch County household was $85,807 and the median family income was $99,014, with a per-capita income of $38,622. The median income for males that were full-time employees was $62,837 and for females $37,394. 4.8% of the population and 3.4% of families were below the poverty line.

In terms of education attainment, out of the 19,926 people in Wasatch County 25 years or older, 920 (4.6%) had not completed high school, 4,099 (20.6%) had a high school diploma or equivalency, 6,207 (31.2%) had some college or associate degree, 5,742 (28.8%) had a bachelor's degree, and 2,958 (14.8%) had a graduate or professional degree.

=== 2010 census ===
As of the 2010 United States census, there were 23,530 people, 4,743 households, and 3,870 families in the county. The population density was 20.0 people per square mile (7.7 people/km^{2}). There were 9,840 (2009) housing units at an average density of 8.37 units per square mile (3.23 units/km^{2}). The racial makeup of the county was 90.4% White, 0.3% Black or African American, 0.5% Native American, 0.8% Asian, 0.1% Pacific Islander, and 1.4% from two or more races. 13.5% of the population were Hispanic or Latino of any race.

There were 7,287 households, out of which 43.1% had children under the age of 18 living with them, 68.70% were married couples living together, 7.4% had a female householder with no husband present, 3.8% had a male householder with no wife present, and 20.1% were non-families. 15.5% of all households were made up of individuals, and 4.8% had someone living alone who was 65 years of age or older. The average household size was 3.18 and the average family size was 3.19.

The county population contained 36.3% under the age of 20, 5.2% from 20 to 24, 28.1% from 25 to 44, 21.9% from 45 to 64, and 8.6% who were 65 years of age or older. The median age was 31.6 years. For every 100 females there were 103.40 males. For every 100 females age 18 and over, there were 101.5 males.

== Communities ==
=== Cities ===
- Heber City (county seat)
- Midway
- Park City (part)

=== Towns ===
- Charleston
- Daniel
- Hideout
- Independence
- Interlaken
- Wallsburg

=== Census-designated places ===
- Timber Lakes

=== Unincorporated communities ===
- Center Creek
- Deer Mountain
- Mayflower Mountain
- Soldier Creek Estates
- Soldier Summit
- Wildwood (part)

=== Former communities ===
- Hailstone
- Jordanelle
- Keetley

== Politics and government ==
The county is governed by a seven-member county council with an appointed county manager.

Wasatch County has traditionally voted Republican. In no national election since 1964 has the county selected the Democratic Party candidate (as of 2024).

State elected offices
Position	District	Name	Affiliation	First elected
Senate	16	Curt Bramble	Republican	2000
Senate	26	Ronald Winterton	Republican	2018
Senate	27	David Hinkins	Republican	2008
House of Representatives	54	Mike Kohler	Republican	2020
Board of Education	12	James Moss Jr.	Republican	2020

United States presidential election results for Wasatch County, Utah
Year	Republican		Democratic		Third party(ies)	
Year	No.	%	No.	%	No.	%
1896	51	3.68%	1,333	96.32%	0	0.00%
1900	723	47.91%	781	51.76%	5	0.33%
1904	1,042	60.79%	656	38.27%	16	0.93%
1908	1,265	53.83%	985	41.91%	100	4.26%
1912	1,210	41.71%	957	32.99%	734	25.30%
1916	817	47.61%	885	51.57%	14	0.82%
1920	1,061	61.05%	665	38.26%	12	0.69%
1924	1,105	52.39%	727	34.47%	277	13.13%
1928	1,340	57.83%	973	41.99%	4	0.17%
1932	1,042	48.17%	1,103	50.99%	18	0.83%
1936	1,029	44.09%	1,299	55.66%	6	0.26%
1940	1,199	44.37%	1,502	55.59%	1	0.04%
1944	1,058	45.82%	1,249	54.09%	2	0.09%
1948	1,165	48.77%	1,219	51.03%	5	0.21%
1952	1,677	63.40%	968	36.60%	0	0.00%
1956	1,738	66.79%	864	33.21%	0	0.00%
1960	1,480	58.11%	1,066	41.85%	1	0.04%
1964	1,158	44.92%	1,420	55.08%	0	0.00%
1968	1,611	60.95%	941	35.60%	91	3.44%
1972	2,046	70.21%	693	23.78%	175	6.01%
1976	1,940	61.59%	1,092	34.67%	118	3.75%
1980	2,799	70.93%	994	25.19%	153	3.88%
1984	2,789	72.93%	1,015	26.54%	20	0.52%
1988	2,487	62.22%	1,451	36.30%	59	1.48%
1992	1,822	42.02%	1,042	24.03%	1,472	33.95%
1996	2,222	52.38%	1,374	32.39%	646	15.23%
2000	3,819	67.30%	1,476	26.01%	380	6.70%
2004	5,503	73.26%	1,854	24.68%	155	2.06%
2008	5,430	62.96%	2,892	33.53%	303	3.51%
2012	7,220	74.90%	2,191	22.73%	229	2.38%
2016	6,115	49.85%	3,063	24.97%	3,088	25.18%
2020	10,795	61.40%	6,187	35.19%	599	3.41%
2024	11,495	62.63%	6,459	35.19%	400	2.18%

== Education ==
All areas of the county are in the Wasatch County School District.

== See also ==
- National Register of Historic Places listings in Wasatch County, Utah
