= Heber City, Utah =

City in Utah, United States

- City
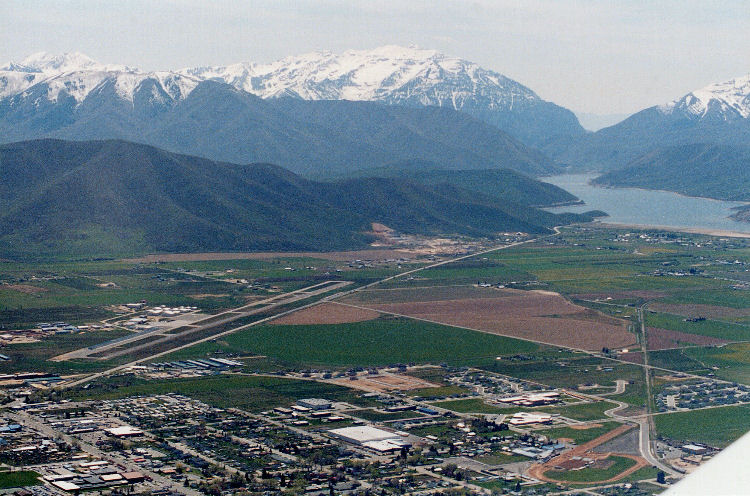
- Heber Valley looking southwest toward Deer Creek Reservoir

- Location of Heber City in Utah (left) and in Wasatch County (right)
- Coordinates: 40°30′25″N 111°24′48″W
- Country: United States
- State: Utah
- County: Wasatch
- Settled: 1859
- Named for: Heber C. Kimball

Area
  - Total: 8.99 sq mi (23.29 km^{2})
  - Land: 8.99 sq mi (23.29 km^{2})
  - Water: 0 sq mi (0.00 km^{2})
- Elevation: 5,601 ft (1,707 m)

Population (2020)
  - Total: 16,856
  - Density: 1,899.3/sq mi (733.33/km^{2})
- Time zone: UTC-7 (Mountain (MST))
  - Summer (DST): UTC-6 (MDT)
- ZIP Code: 84032
- Area code: 435
- FIPS code: 49-34200
- GNIS feature ID: 1455878
- Website: heberut.gov

Heber City is a city and county seat of Wasatch County, Utah. The population was 16,856 as of the 2020 United States census. The city is located 43 miles (69 km) southeast of Salt Lake City.

== History ==
Heber City was first settled in 1859 by Robert Broadhead, James Davis, and James Gurr. John W. Witt built the first house in the area. The area was under the direction of Bishop Silas Smith, who was in Provo. In 1860, Joseph S. Murdock became the bishop of The Church of Jesus Christ of Latter-day Saints in Heber City and its vicinity.

During the Second World War, a group of Japanese-Americans formed a voluntary relocation camp in nearby Keetley. Some Japanese-Americans also resided in Heber City.

== Geography ==
The region in which Heber City is located is known as the Wasatch Back.

According to the United States Census Bureau, the city has a total area of 3.5 square miles (8.9 km^{2}), all land.

Heber City is located near three large reservoirs, Jordanelle, Deer Creek, and Strawberry.

=== Climate ===
Large seasonal temperature differences typify this climatic region, with warm to hot (and often humid) summers and cold (sometimes severely cold) winters. According to the Köppen climate classification system, Heber City has a warm-summer humid continental climate, abbreviated ‘’Dfb’’ on climate maps.

Climate data for Heber City, Utah (1991–2020 normals, extremes 1893–2013)
Month	Jan	Feb	Mar	Apr	May	Jun	Jul	Aug	Sep	Oct	Nov	Dec	Year
Record high °F (°C)	60 (16)	68 (20)	79 (26)	86 (30)	92 (33)	100 (38)	105 (41)	102 (39)	99 (37)	88 (31)	78 (26)	68 (20)	105 (41)
Mean maximum °F (°C)	50.4 (10.2)	53.9 (12.2)	68.3 (20.2)	77.0 (25.0)	85.3 (29.6)	91.8 (33.2)	97.6 (36.4)	95.4 (35.2)	89.1 (31.7)	81.5 (27.5)	65.7 (18.7)	53.8 (12.1)	97.3 (36.3)
Mean daily maximum °F (°C)	36.5 (2.5)	41.3 (5.2)	52.7 (11.5)	61.4 (16.3)	71.2 (21.8)	81.6 (27.6)	89.5 (31.9)	87.5 (30.8)	78.6 (25.9)	65.5 (18.6)	49.6 (9.8)	37.0 (2.8)	62.7 (17.1)
Daily mean °F (°C)	24.5 (−4.2)	28.5 (−1.9)	38.2 (3.4)	45.6 (7.6)	53.7 (12.1)	61.9 (16.6)	69.5 (20.8)	68.0 (20.0)	59.3 (15.2)	48.1 (8.9)	35.7 (2.1)	25.6 (−3.6)	46.6 (8.1)
Mean daily minimum °F (°C)	12.5 (−10.8)	15.8 (−9.0)	23.8 (−4.6)	29.9 (−1.2)	36.2 (2.3)	42.1 (5.6)	49.6 (9.8)	48.5 (9.2)	40.1 (4.5)	30.7 (−0.7)	21.8 (−5.7)	14.1 (−9.9)	30.4 (−0.9)
Mean minimum °F (°C)	−5.4 (−20.8)	−1.2 (−18.4)	10.0 (−12.2)	19.0 (−7.2)	26.4 (−3.1)	33.4 (0.8)	42.0 (5.6)	40.2 (4.6)	29.8 (−1.2)	20.3 (−6.5)	5.5 (−14.7)	−2.0 (−18.9)	−10.4 (−23.6)
Record low °F (°C)	−35 (−37)	−38 (−39)	−17 (−27)	0 (−18)	15 (−9)	25 (−4)	27 (−3)	24 (−4)	12 (−11)	6 (−14)	−23 (−31)	−36 (−38)	−38 (−39)
Average precipitation inches (mm)	1.86 (47)	1.72 (44)	1.17 (30)	1.39 (35)	1.40 (36)	0.87 (22)	0.53 (13)	0.84 (21)	1.24 (31)	1.30 (33)	1.13 (29)	1.62 (41)	15.07 (382)
Average snowfall inches (cm)	21.5 (55)	13.9 (35)	6.7 (17)	4.0 (10)	0.8 (2.0)	0.0 (0.0)	0.0 (0.0)	0.0 (0.0)	0.0 (0.0)	1.7 (4.3)	8.6 (22)	17.8 (45)	75.0 (191)
Average precipitation days (≥ 0.01 in)	9.3	8.2	7.9	8.7	8.4	5.9	4.8	6.2	6.2	7.2	7.3	8.1	88.2
Average snowy days (≥ 0.1 in)	7.0	6.0	3.7	2.1	0.3	0.0	0.0	0.0	0.0	0.9	3.5	5.6	29.1
Source: NOAA

== Demographics ==
Historical population
Census	Pop.	Note	%±
1870	658		—
1880	1,291		96.2%
1890	1,538		19.1%
1900	1,725		12.2%
1910	2,214		28.3%
1920	2,071		−6.5%
1930	2,477		19.6%
1940	2,748		10.9%
1950	2,936		6.8%
1960	2,936		0.0%
1970	3,245		10.5%
1980	4,362		34.4%
1990	4,782		9.6%
2000	7,291		52.5%
2010	11,362		55.8%
2020	16,856		48.4%
U.S. Decennial Census

As of the census of 2010, there were 11,362 people and 3,637 households residing in the city. The population density was 2,113.5 people per square mile (816/km^{2}). There were 3,637 housing units at an average density of 710.5 per square mile (274.3/km^{2}). The racial makeup of the city was 87.7% White, 0.4% African American, 0.8% Native American, 1.1% Asian, 0.1% Pacific Islander. Hispanic or Latino of any race were 18.4% of the population.

There were 3,362 households, out of which 50.2% had children under the age of 18 living with them, 66% were married couples living together, 9.4% had a female householder with no husband present, and 20.6% were non-families. Of all households, 15.9% were individuals, and 6.4% had someone living alone who was 65 years or older. The average household size was 3.35, and the average family size was 3.78. The median age was 28.5 years.

The median income for a household in the city was $45,394, and the median income for a family was $47,481. Males had a median income of $33,816 versus $21,524 for females. The per capita income was $17,358. About 4.8% of families and 6.1% of the population were below the poverty line, including 6.7% of those under age 18 and 1.9% of those age 65 or older.

== Economy ==
Heber City has one of the lowest unemployment rates in Utah. Local developers and business leaders cite that there are not enough jobs in the city itself (as 27% of residents commute to Park City or Salt Lake City for work) and wish to improve the city's self-reliance. Average home prices in the valley doubled from 2002 to 2008, and the population has grown by 25% in that same time period.

Tourism is a year-round industry in the Heber Valley. The winter season features cross-country and downhill skiing, snowboarding, and snowmobiling on several trails and the nearby ski resorts of Park City. In the summer and fall, golfing, off-roading, hunting, fishing, and other outdoor recreational activities are abundant. Heber is also home to the Heber Valley Historic Railroad (HVRR), known to Utah residents by its nickname, the Heber Creeper.

Heber City's youth are employed largely in the surrounding golf courses, restaurants, and specialty shops in Heber City and the surrounding area. Local contractors and farmers are also a major source of employment for the youth. The adult population work mostly in Park City, Salt Lake City, Provo, and Orem. Skiing and Snowboarding are very popular among Heber City's youth, and many people go to Park City mountain resort, Canyons, or Deer Valley, all of which are in Park City. Farming and ranching are a large economic force, but this has diminished slightly. The largest local employer is the Wasatch County School District.

== Education ==
Within the city limits are Heber Valley, Old Mill, Daniels Canyon, and J.R. Smith Elementary Schools, Timpanogos Middle School, Rocky Mountain Middle School, Wasatch High School, and Wasatch Alternative High School. An additional school in the Heber Valley is Midway Elementary School. All of these schools are part of the Wasatch County School District.

Utah Valley University maintains a satellite campus just north of Heber City along the US-40 corridor.

== Transportation ==
U.S. Route 40 and U.S. Route 189 both cross the city. Interstate 80 is located approximately eighteen miles north of the city and can be accessed via Highway 40, while Interstate 15 can be accessed via Highway 189 through Provo Canyon and is approximately twenty-five miles away. A typical drive to downtown Salt Lake City is 45 to 60 minutes.

Heber City was connected to Provo by a 32-mile-long (51 km) railroad line. The line, completed in 1899, was used by Denver & Rio Grande Western until 1967. Today, a portion of the line is used by the famous Heber Valley Railroad, a heritage railroad open to the public.

The Heber City Municipal Airport, or Russ McDonald Field, FAA identifier HCR, is located two miles south of the city, near the junction of U.S. Route 40 and U.S. Route 189, and is capable of handling aircraft up to large corporate jets, including Gulfstreams and Global Express. Approximately 85 aircraft are based at the airport. The airport is served by a GPS instrument approach procedure, allowing aircraft to arrive at the airport in adverse weather. During the winter ski season, and particularly the Sundance Film Festival, the airport is crowded with corporate jets as it is the closest airport to Park City. The nearest airports with commercial airline service are Provo Municipal Airport (35 miles) and Salt Lake City International Airport (49 miles).

High Valley Transit provides free local transit in Heber City, with the 106 providing service to Park City, where connections are available to Kamas Valley, Kimball Junction and Salt Lake City. There is also a microtransit zone within Heber City.

Intercity transportation is provided by two round-trips operated by Salt Lake Express on its Vernal - Salt Lake City route.

== Notable people ==
- Tyson Apostol (born 1979), winner of reality TV competition Survivor: Blood vs. Water
- J. Reuben Clark (1871–1961), attorney, author, LDS apostle
- Ernie Lively (1947–2021), actor
- Jason Lively (born 1968), actor and entrepreneur
- Cael Sanderson (born 1979), college wrestling champion and current wrestling coach at Penn State
- Sofía Gómez Villafañe (born 1994), cross-country mountain biker and cyclo-cross cyclist

== See also ==
- Heber, Utah micropolitan area
- List of cities and towns in Utah
