= Daniel, Utah =

- Town
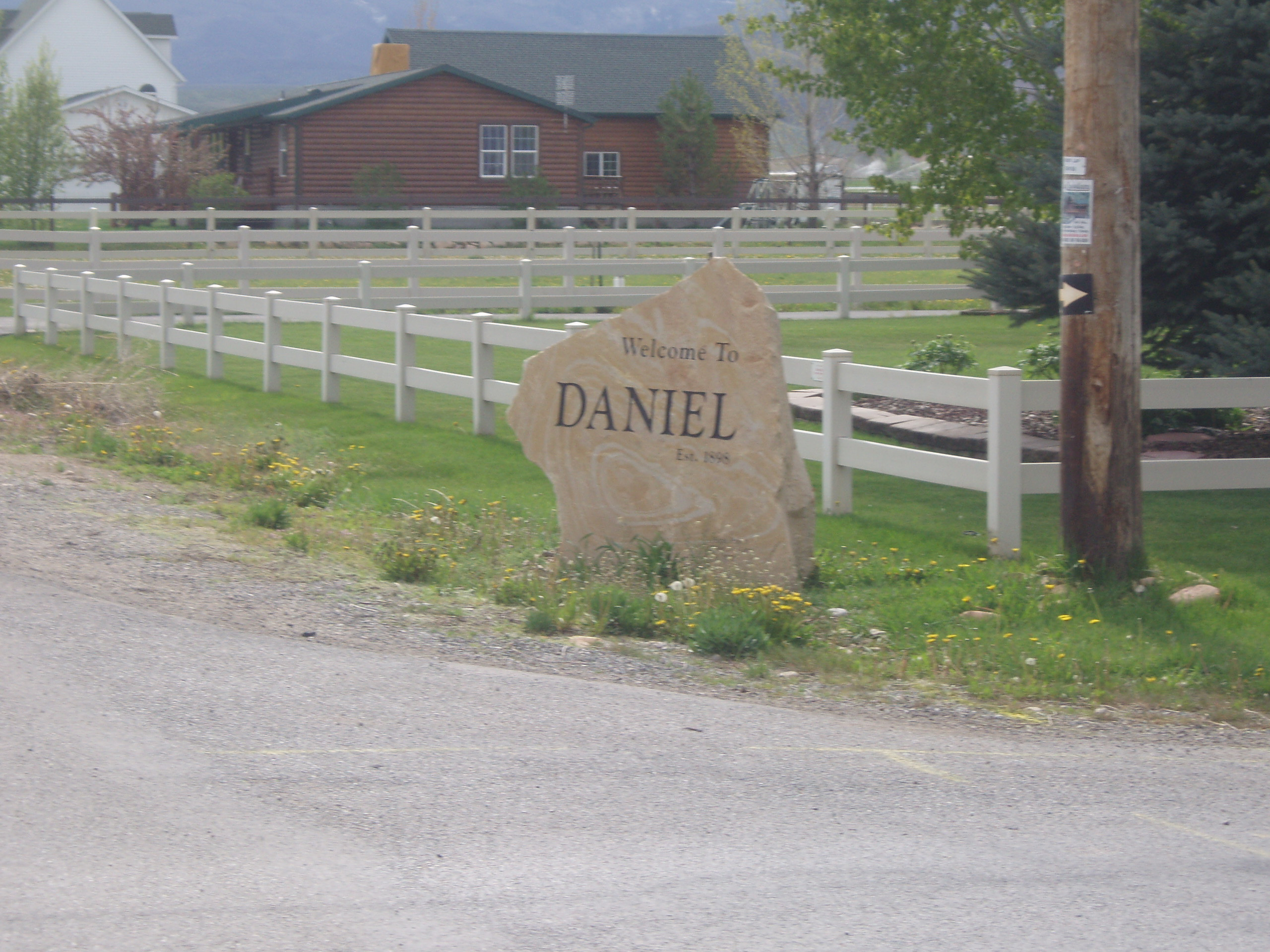
- Daniel welcome sign, May 2010

- Location in Wasatch County and the state of Utah
- Coordinates: 40°27′35″N 111°23′20″W
- Country: United States
- State: Utah
- County: Wasatch
- Settled: 1874
- Given Township Status: 1997
- Incorporated: February 28, 2006

Area
  - Total: 3.29 sq mi (8.53 km^{2})
  - Land: 3.29 sq mi (8.53 km^{2})
  - Water: 0 sq mi (0.00 km^{2})
- Elevation: 5,748 ft (1,752 m)

Population (2020)
  - Total: 916
  - Density: 327.2/sq mi (126.32/km^{2})
- Time zone: UTC-7 (Mountain (MST))
  - Summer (DST): UTC-6 (MDT)
- FIPS code: 49-18140
- GNIS feature ID: 2412402
- Website: danielutah.gov

Daniel is a town in Wasatch County, Utah, United States. The population was 916 at the 2020 census. Daniel incorporated as a town in February 2006. Daniel was first settled in 1874.

== Geography ==
According to the United States Census Bureau, the CDP had a total area of 3.8 square miles (9.8 km^{2}), all land.

== Demographics ==
Historical population
Census	Pop.	Note	%±
2000	770		—
2010	938		21.8%
2020	916		−2.3%
U.S. Decennial Census

As of the census of 2000, there were 770 people, 238 households, and 209 families residing in the CDP. The population density was 205.3 people per square mile (79.3/km^{2}). There were 259 housing units at an average density of 69.1 per square mile (26.7/km^{2}). The racial makeup of the CDP was 97.14% White, 0.26% African American, 0.52% Native American, 0.52% Asian, 0.13% from other races, and 1.43% from two or more races. Hispanic or Latino of any race were 3.51% of the population.

There were 238 households, out of which 42.0% had children under the age of 18 living with them, 79.8% were married couples living together, 5.5% had a female householder with no husband present, and 11.8% were non-families. 9.2% of all households were made up of individuals, and 2.9% had someone living alone who was 65 years of age or older. The average household size was 3.23, and the average family size was 3.45.

In the CDP, the population was spread out, with 29.5% under 18, 10.8% from 18 to 24, 24.8% from 25 to 44, 25.7% from 45 to 64, and 9.2% who were 65 years of age or older. The median age was 35 years. For every 100 females, there were 107.0 males. For every 100 females aged 18 and over, there were 112.9 males.

The median income for a household in the CDP was $60,000, and the median income for a family was $59,773. Males had a median income of $43,542 versus $16,667 for females. The per capita income for the CDP was $21,764. About 4.0% of families and 5.1% of the population were below the poverty line, including 5.0% of those under age 18 and none aged 65 or over.

At the time of Daniel's incorporation, the Utah Population Estimates Committee produced an official estimate of the town's population of 696.

== See also ==
- List of cities and towns in Utah
