= Utah State Route 113 =

State highway in Utah, United States

State Route 113
- Provo Canyon Scenic Byway

Route information
- Maintained by UDOT
- Length: 7.141 mi (11.492 km)
- Existed: 1931–present

Major junctions
- South end: US 189 in Charleston
- SR-222 in Midway
- North end: US 40 / US 189 in Heber City

Location
- Country: United States
- State: Utah
- Counties: Wasatch

Highway system
- Utah State Highway System; Interstate; US; State; Minor; Scenic
← SR-112	→ SR-114

State Route 113 (SR‑113) is a 7.1 miles (11.4 km) state highway in the Heber Valley in northern Wasatch County, Utah, United States, that connects U.S. Route 189 (US‑189) in Charleston with U.S. Route 40 (US‑40)/US‑189 in Heber City and forms a northern loop off of US‑189 by way of Midway. The entire length has been designated as part of the Provo Canyon Scenic Byway.

== Route description ==
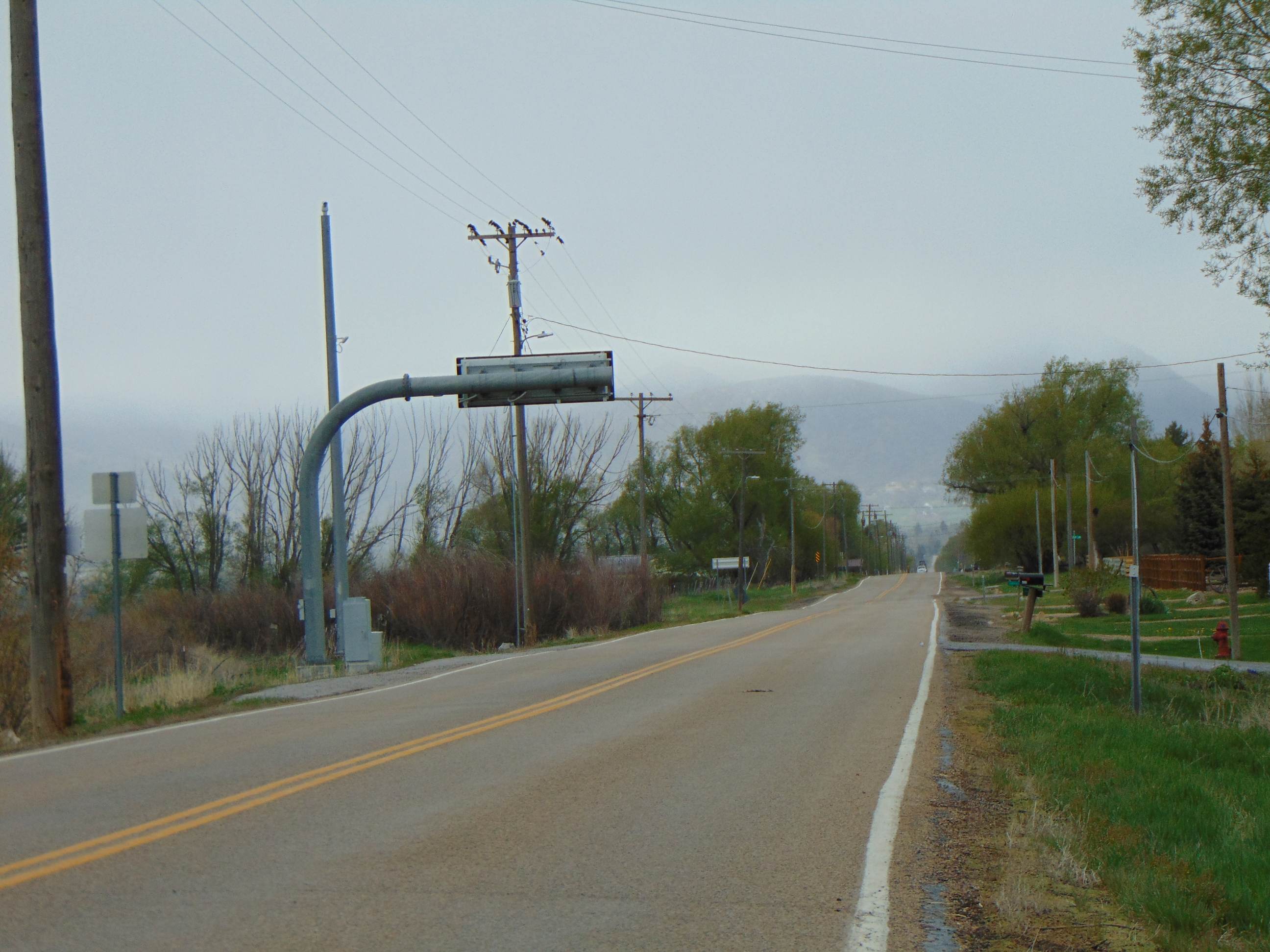
Looking north along SR-113 from near its southern terminus at US-189, April 2016

SR‑113 begins at the intersection of South 3600 West/Charleston Road and US‑189 on the northeast shore of Deer Creek Reservoir on the southwestern corner of Charleston. From its southern terminus, the route heads north as a two-lane road along South 3600 West/Charleston Road to pass through the length of the west side of Charleston. Along the way it connects with the west end of West 3600 South before passing by the west side of the Charleston City Park. On the north edge of the park, the route connects with the west end of West 3400 South, and then the west ends of West 3300 South, West 3150 South, and West 3000 South. The route then connects with a gravel road that heads west to the Deer Creek State Park Charleston Day Use Area, followed by a connection with the west end of West 2400 South on the northwest edge of town.

Immediately after leaving Charleston, the route enters the northeastern part of Deer Creek State Park and makes its first crossing over the Provo River. The route then connects with a Rest Area (on the east side of the road) before a level crossing over the single set of tracks for the Heber Valley Railroad (formerly known as the Heber Creeper), just west of the Charleston station. Immediately after crossing the tracks, the route connects with the east end of Tate Lane (formerly Utah State Route 220), the road to the Soldier Hollow area of the Wasatch Mountain State Park. (Tate Lane also provides access to the Cascade Springs area in the Uinta National Forest.) The route also begins running along the border of Midway (to the east), until it fully enters the city, about 1,500 feet (460 m) north of the railroad tracks.

Just after entering Midway, SR‑113 crosses over the small Snake Creek, as it passes by some recently constructed residential developments to the west. Continuing north (again along the border of Midway, but with the city now to the west) the route connects with the east end of West 970 South and the west end of East 850 South (which leads to the Midway Fish Hatchery). Passing briefly back into an unincorporated area of Wasatch County, the route connects with the southeast end of South Appenzell Lane, before re-entering Midway.

Continuing north through Midway, SR‑113 (signed as South Center Street) connects with the west end of East 500 South, the west end of East 450 South, and the east end of West 350 South. After crossing 300 South and 100 South (passing through a residential area), the route reaches Main Street at a junction with the southern end of Utah State Route 222 (SR‑222). At this intersection, the route turns east along East Main Street, while North Center Street continues north, and West Main Street continues west as SR‑222 towards the Homestead Resort, the Zermatt Resort, and the main part of Wasatch Mountain State Park.

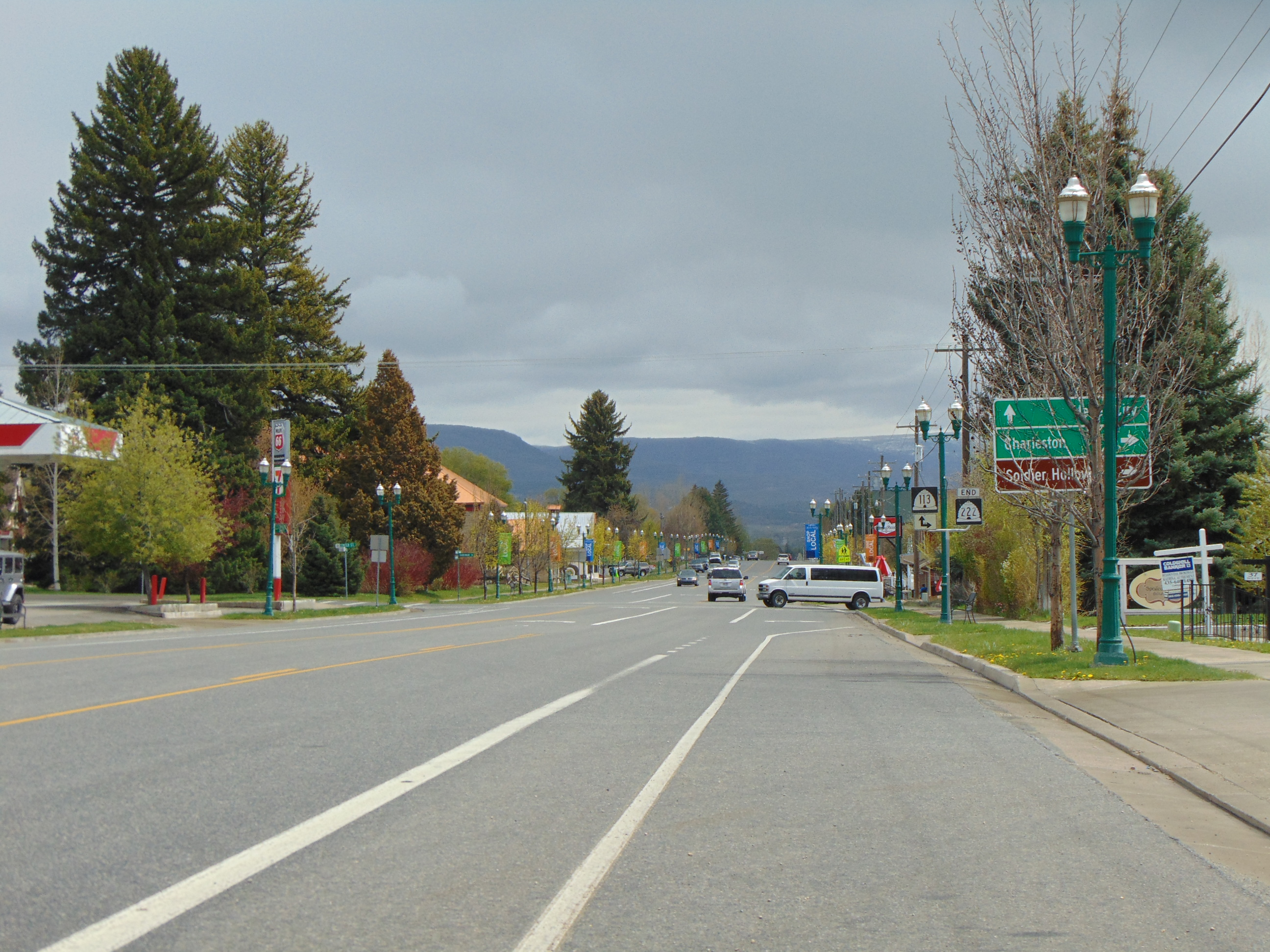
Looking east along Main Street toward the junction of SR-113 and Utah State Route 222, April 2016

Heading east along the three-lane East Main Street, SR‑113 passes through the east end of Midway's business district. (In addition to the center turn lane, Main Street has bicycle lanes on both sides of the road between 200 West and 300 East.) After crossing 100 East, the area becomes mix of residences and businesses as it crosses 200 East and connects with the south end of North 300 East and reaching 400 East/River Road. (While South 400 East only continues south to just beyond East 100 South, North 400 East continues north as North River Road to East 1050 North, before heading northeasterly to Midway Junction, where it connects with US‑40/US‑189 and the southern end of Utah State Route 32.) Shortly after connecting with the northern ends of South 500 East (Fox Den Lane), South 580 East, and South 700, SR‑113 curves southeast (becoming West Midway Lane) and runs along the eastern border of Midway (connecting with the south end of Johnson Mill Road) until it reaches its connection with the north end of South 950 East (Michie Lane).

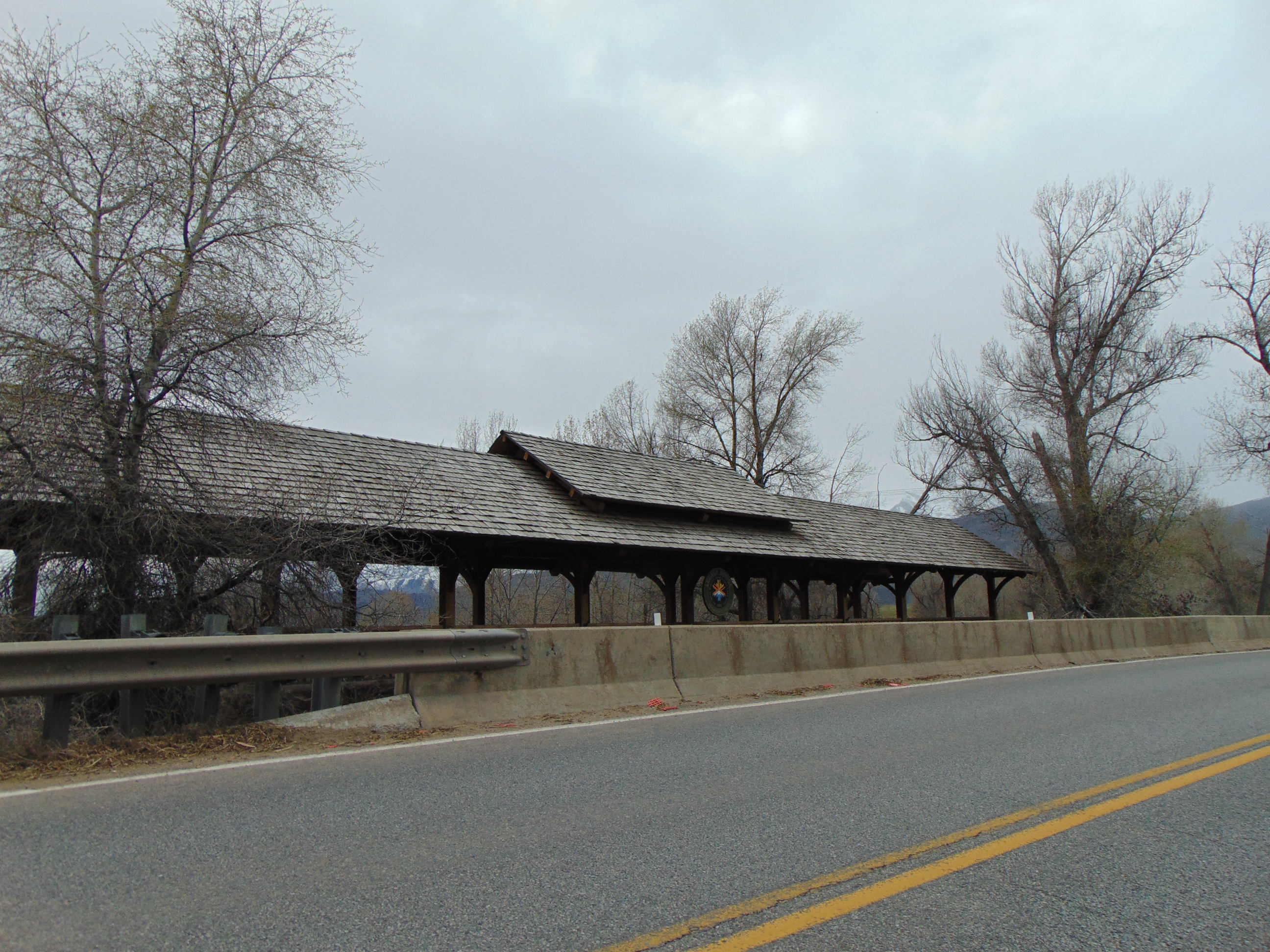
Looking southwest across SR-113 at the Legacy Bridge over the Provo River, April 2016

The route then leaves Midway, and begins curving back to an eastern direction, before reaching the north end of South 1000. The route then promptly makes its second crossing over the Provo River. Just south of the bridge over the Provo River is the Legacy Bridge. (An urban jogging/biking trail that runs along the south side of SR‑113 from South 700 East in Midway to South 600 East in Heber City crosses that bridge.) East of the river, the route completes its curve to the east and connects with the south end of South Ryan Lane. Heading east, SR‑113 connects with the south end of South 1750 West before crossing over Spring Creek and then (through open fields) continues east to connect with the north end of South 1140 West (Southfield Road).

East of South 1140 West SR‑113 runs along the border of Heber City (with city and its Southfield Park to the south) until it crosses the Sagebrush and Spring Creek Canal. East of the canal the route fully enters Heber City and runs along East 100 South for the remainder of its course. Shortly after connecting with the north end of South 780 West, the route begins a slight jog to the south and then crosses South 600 East. (Prior to being removed in the 1970s, the rail tracks that were part of what is now the Heber Valley Railroad crossed the route, immediately west of South 600 East, and continued north to the Heber Depot. The former depot is still located at the east end of West Center Street. The current depot building for, and northern terminus for, the historic railroad is located south on South 600 East at 450 South.)

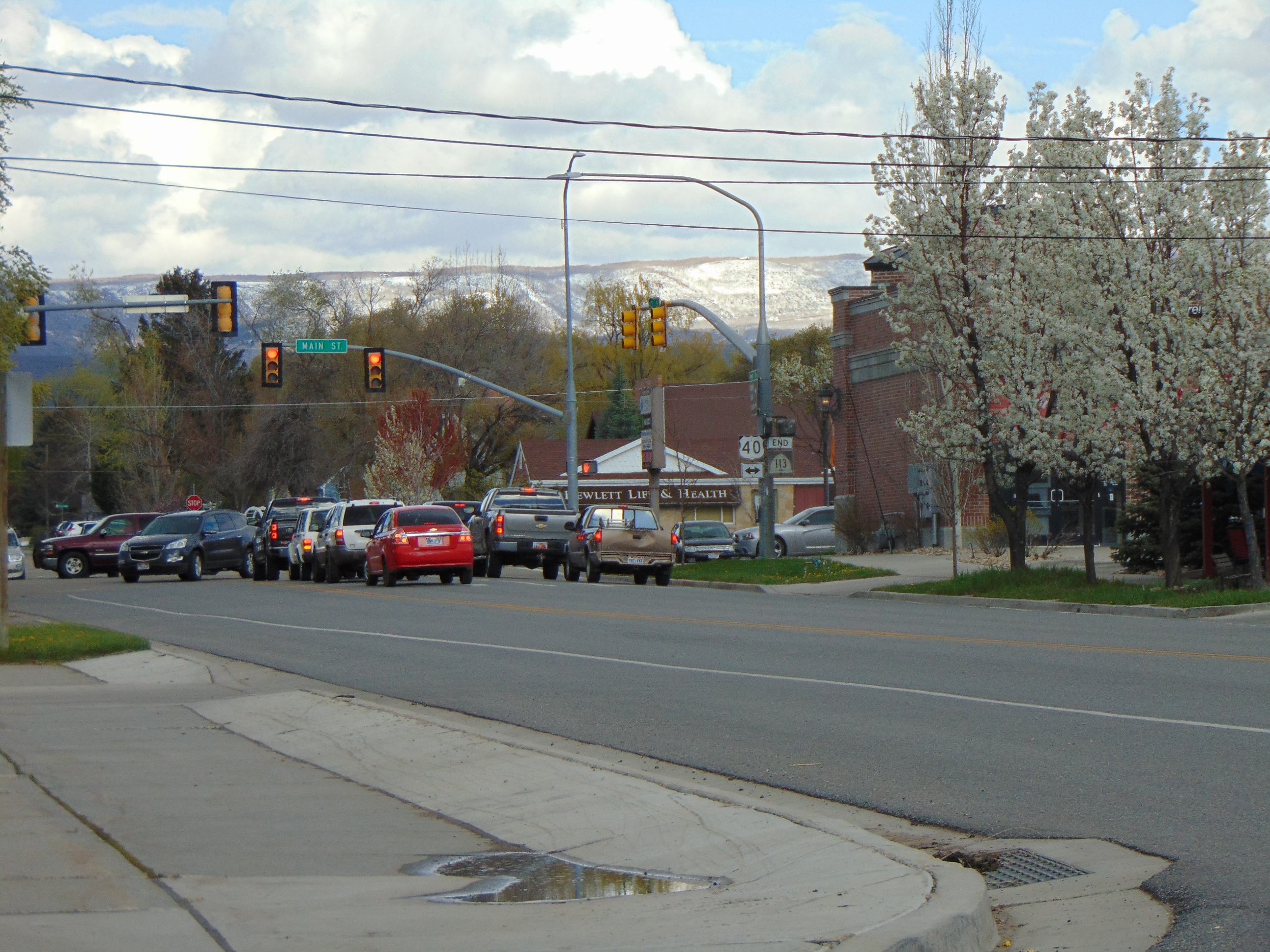
Northern terminus in Heber City

Just after crossing South 500 East, the route completes its slight jog to the south, crosses South 400 East, and begins passing through three blocks of residential areas. After crossing South 300 East, South 200 East, and South 100 East, the route passes through a block of the business district before reaching its northern terminus at South Main Street (US‑40/US‑189). East 100 South continues east to end at South 5000 East, while South Main Street continues south to the Provo Canyon Junction on the south end of town and north past the east side of the Jordanelle Reservoir to Silver Creek Junction, where it connects with Interstate 80.

== History ==
The route was first defined by the Utah State Legislature in 1931 and has not seen any significant changes since then.

In 1935, the legislature designated State Route 169, which began on US-40 one block north of the eastern terminus of SR-113. From there, that route ran east along Center Street and Lake Creek Road to Lake Creek. It was decommissioned in 1953.

== Major intersections ==
The entire route is in Wasatch County.

Location	mi	km	Destinations	Notes
Charleston	0.000	0.000	US 189 – Heber City, Orem, Provo	Southern terminus; On the east shore of Deer Creek Reservoir
Charleston	1.313	2.113	Road west to Deer Creek State Park Charleston Day Use Area	
Deer Creek State Park	1.471– 1.498	2.367– 2.411		
Deer Creek State Park	1.883	3.030	Rest area east	
	2.125	3.420	Heber Valley Railroad (formerly known as the Heber Creeper) track	Level crossing just east of the Charleston station
	2.143	3.449	Tate Lane west – Wasatch Mountain State Park (including Soldier Hollow), Cascade Springs	Formerly SR-220
Midway	3.908	6.289	SR-222 north (West Main Street) – Wasatch Mountain State Park	
Midway	4.356	7.010	North River Road (North 400 East) north – US-40/US-189/SR-32	The River Road junction with US-40/US-189/SR-32 is at Midway Junction
	5.211– 5.232	8.386– 8.420	Bridge over the Provo River	
Heber City	7.141	11.492	US 40 / US 189 (South Main Street) – I-80, Duchesne	Northern terminus
1.000 mi = 1.609 km; 1.000 km = 0.621 mi

== See also ==
- List of state highways in Utah
- List of highways numbered 113
