= Utah State Route 224 =

State highway in Summit County, Utah, United States

State Route 224
- Map of SR-224 (delineated in red)

Route information
- Maintained by UDOT
- Length: 11.597 mi (18.664 km)
- Existed: 1941–present
- Restrictions: Closed in winter over Empire Pass

Major junctions
- South end: Summit County/Wasatch County border near Midway
- SR-248 in Park City
- North end: I-80 at Kimball Junction

Location
- Country: United States
- State: Utah

Highway system
- Utah State Highway System; Interstate; US; State; Minor; Scenic
← SR-222	→ SR-225

State Route 224 (SR-224) is a north–south state highway in the U.S. state of Utah. The route connects Interstate 80 and Kimball Junction in the north to Park City in the south. Ski resorts line the mostly four-lane highway, including Park City Resort and Deer Valley. The highway has changed paths many times since its formation in 1941, at one point connecting to Big Cottonwood Canyon and Salt Lake County. However, realignments brought the route to its present path by 1990.

== Route description ==
The route begins at a single-point urban interchange with I-80 at exit 145 (which is referred to as Kimball Junction) and heads south on a four-lane undivided highway, passing through commercial development. An access road intersects the road that connects SR-224 to the Utah Olympic Park. As the highway approaches Snyderville, the commercial buildings turn into residential homes and the road briefly turns southwest before turning southeast and then south again. Residential development disappears when the highway turns southeast and hills appear on either side of the road. Homes appear yet again on either side of the road with a country club on the eastern side of the road and a golf course on the west. The route intersects with SR-248 and enters Park City as Park Avenue. The route turns off of Park Avenue and onto Deer Valley Drive. The road turns southeast and bypasses the center of town. A roundabout appears and the road turns onto Marsac Avenue, a two-lane road. As the route exits Park City and heads into rural Summit County, a runaway truck ramp appears on the east side of the road, serving northbound traffic. As the highway enters more forested and elevated terrain, it turns southwest and continues in a general southerly direction through Ontario Canyon before terminating at the Wasatch County line.

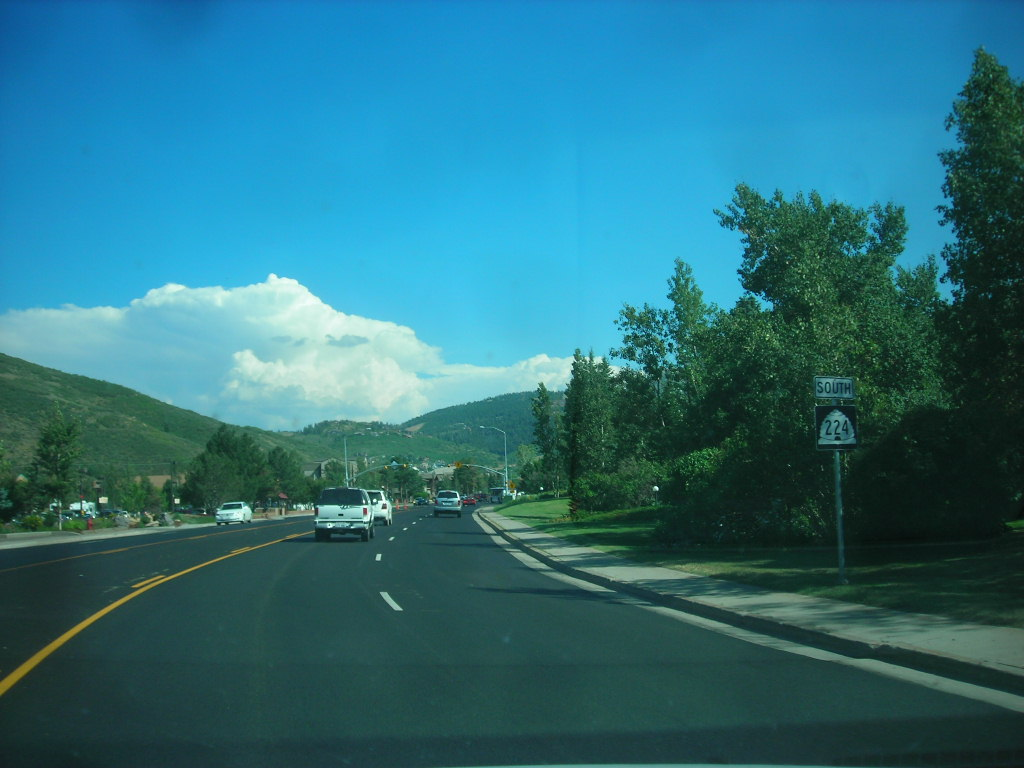
SR-224 southbound

The entire route between the I-80 interchange and the seasonal closure point near the Empire Lodge of Deer Valley Resort is included in the National Highway System.

== History ==
The road from Park City north to US-530 (eventually US-40, now I-80) at Kimball Junction was part of the first state road connecting Salt Lake City and Echo, added to the system in 1910. It was numbered US-40 in the 1920s, and in 1927 the short spur connecting Park City Junction (now Kearns Boulevard) to southern Park City was included in the legal definition of US-40, only to be split off in 1945 as State Route 97.

The initial designation of SR-224 was made in 1941 as a short spur from SR-113 in Midway to Schneitter's Hot Pots, now the Homestead Resort. In 1963, the state legislature extended the route northwest from the resort to the border of the new Wasatch Mountain State Park, and that same year the State Road Commission extended it farther in order to better serve the park. The new definition of SR-224 continued through the park, past a junction with SR-152 (now SR-190), itself extended to meet SR-224, and into Park City; there it replaced the entirety of SR-97 to end at SR-248. This extension also provided an alternate connection to Salt Lake County. In 1969, SR-248 north of Kearns Boulevard became SR-224, giving the latter route its present northern terminus at Kimball's Junction.

Meanwhile, in 1966, the state transportation commission added State Route 220 to the state highway system to serve Wasatch Mountain State Park. This route began at SR-113 north of Deer Creek Reservoir and ran southwest to Cascade Springs, north to Snake Creek (with a gap in the route where it passed through the Uinta National Forest), and southeast along the creek to SR-224 north of Midway.

In 1990, the state and Wasatch County executed a trade, wherein SR-32 around the south side of the Jordanelle Reservoir was restored to the state highway system (it had carried US-189 until the reservoir forced its relocation), and portions of SR-190, SR-220, and SR-224 became county roads. In particular, all of SR-220 was decommissioned, while SR-224 was removed from the state highway system between the Pine Creek Campground (near the state park boundary) and the Wasatch-Summit County line. The unconnected southern portion between SR-113 and the campground, however, remained part of SR-224 until 2004, when it was redesignated as SR-222 to eliminate confusion. This brought SR-224 to its current extent, lying entirely within Summit County; what had been SR-224 until 1963 is now entirely SR-222.

In May 2010, a woman sued Google for $100,000 plus punitive damages after Google Maps told her to walk down the Deer Valley Drive portion of SR-224 and she was struck by a car.

== Major intersections ==
The entire route is in Summit County.

Location	mi	km	Destinations	Notes
	0.000	0.000	Summit County/Wasatch County border	Southern terminus
Park City	6.040	9.720	SR-248 east (Kearns Boulevard)	
Snyderville	11.524	18.546	I-80 – Salt Lake City, Cheyenne	
Snyderville	11.597	18.664	Bitner Road west/Rasmussen Road east	Northern terminus
1.000 mi = 1.609 km; 1.000 km = 0.621 mi
