= Soldier Hollow (disambiguation) =

Soldier Hollow may refer to:

- Soldier Hollow (Oklahoma), a small canyon located on the south shore of Lake Eucha in Delaware County, Oklahoma, United States
- Soldier Hollow (Utah), a small canyon in the Wasatch Range within the Wasatch Mountain State Park in northwestern Wasatch County, Utah, United States
  - Soldier Hollow, a sports venue (primarily for winter sports, such as cross-country, biathlon, etc.) located within the Wasatch Mountain State Park at the mouth of Soldier Hollow (Utah) that was established for the 2002 Winter Olympics
    - Soldier Hollow station, a train station for the Heber Valley Railroad near the sports venue (in a narrow area between the Wasatch Mountain and Deer Creek state parks) that was established to facilitate transportation the Olympic venue in 2002
- Soldier Hollow (horse), a full-blooded English thoroughbred that raced in Germany in the 2000s
