= Utah State Route 190 =

State highway in Utah, United States

State Route 190
- Big Cottonwood Canyon Scenic Byway

Route information
- Maintained by UDOT
- Length: 19.934 mi (32.081 km)
- Existed: 1987–present
- Restrictions: Closed in winter over Guardsman Pass

Major junctions
- West end: East 6200 South in Holladay
- I-215 in Holladay; SR-210 in Cottonwood Heights
- East end: Salt Lake County/Wasatch County line

Location
- Country: United States
- State: Utah
- Counties: Salt Lake

Highway system
- Utah State Highway System; Interstate; US; State; Minor; Scenic
← SR-186	→ US 191

State Route 190 (SR-190) or the Big Cottonwood Canyon Scenic Byway is primarily an east and west state highway and scenic highway in eastern Salt Lake County, Utah, United States, that begins at Interstate 215 (I-215), runs through Big Cottonwood Canyon (including the Brighton Loop), and ends at the Salt Lake and Wasatch county line.

== Route description ==
=== Holladay and Cottonwood Heights ===
SR-190 begins at a single point urban interchange with I-215 (though the rightmost lane of the eastbound off-ramp actually leads to 3000 East instead of SR-190) and the road curves to the south as it climbs from the Knudsen's Corner lowlands near Big Cottonwood Creek to run first along the bottom of the south-facing mountainside leading up to Mount Olympus to the north and then along the west-facing mountainside just north of Big Cottonwood Canyon's mouth. The border between the cities of Holladay and Cottonwood Heights loosely follows the route until the intersection with Wasatch Boulevard. North of Wasatch Boulevard, the route passes several office buildings, the Old Mill Golf Course, and a Utah Transit Authority park-and-ride lot. South of Wasatch Boulevard (where SR-190 actually takes on the Wasatch Boulevard name) there is only a quarry to the east and the view to the valley below to the west; at the base of the cliff, but out of sight, is the old paper mill building with which the area is often identified.

The route continues south over a bridge spanning Big Cottonwood Creek and the planned final phase of the Big Cottonwood Creek multi-use trail at the mouth of the canyon, then intersects with SR-210, which continues south as Wasatch Boulevard, and Fort Union Boulevard, which heads west. Traffic following SR-190 east must turn left at this intersection. Beyond the intersection, park-and-ride lots used only for ski buses (or otherwise for the benefit of canyon visitors) and a water treatment plant are visible to the north and residential development within Cottonwood Heights city occupies the slope to the south.

=== Big Cottonwood Canyon ===
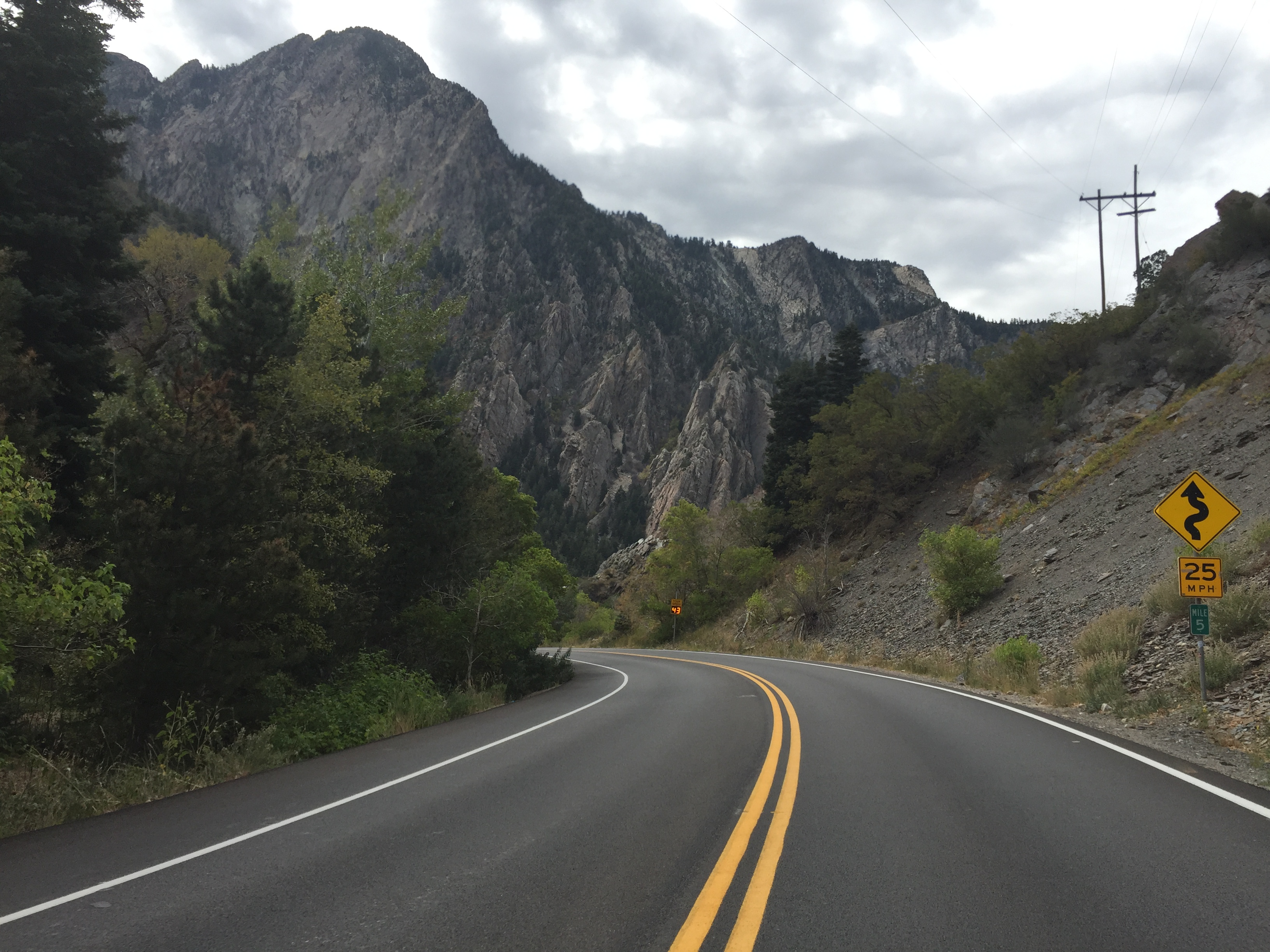
Westbound SR-190 through Big Cottonwood Canyon, September 2015

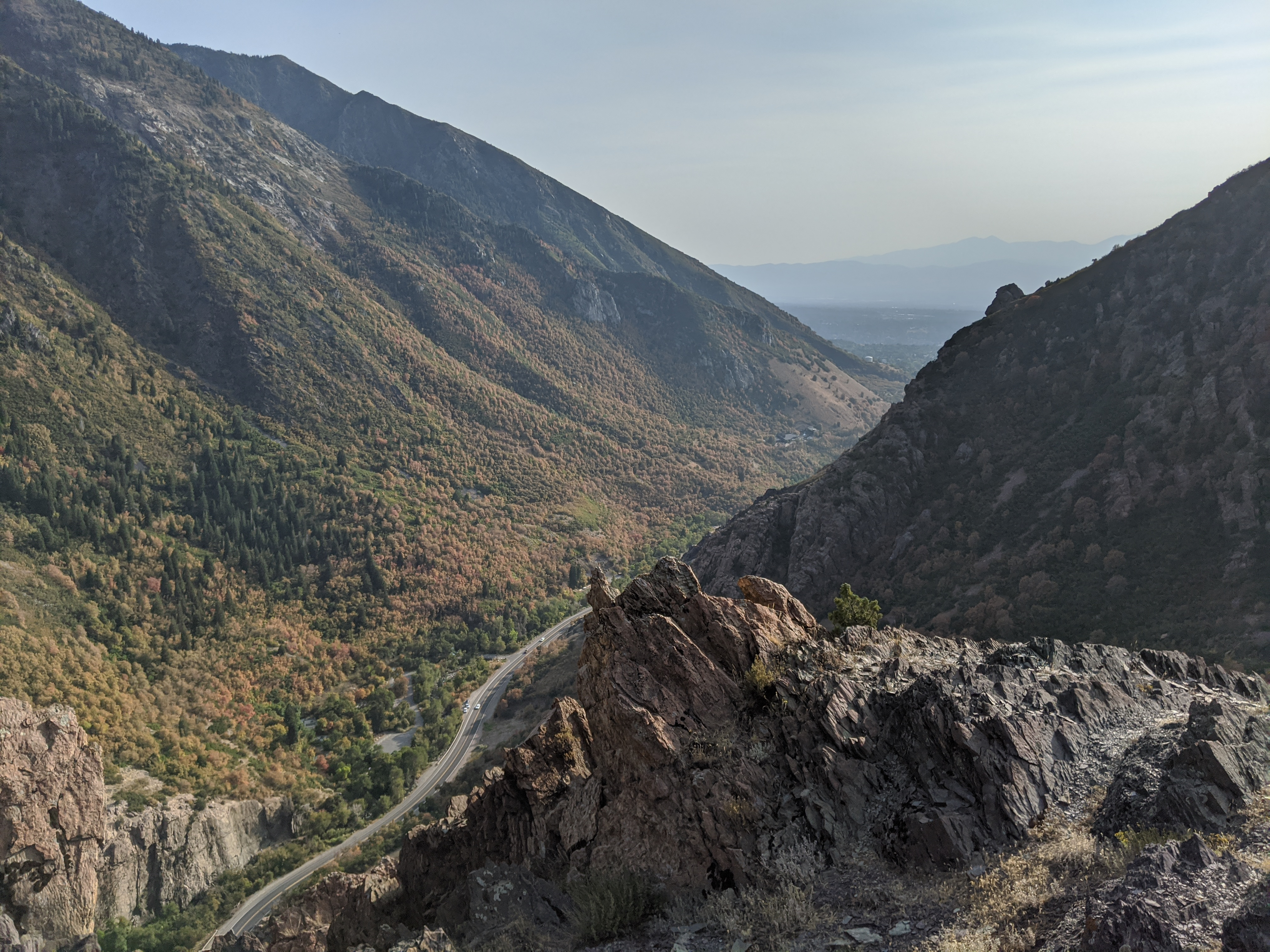
Eastbound SR-190 through Big Cottonwood Canyon, seen from the north, September 2020

Signs of urban development quickly disappear as the canyon walls get closer together. The route passes many trailheads and picnic areas within the canyon, as well as historic water- and mining-related infrastructure and a few areas of cabins, before passing Solitude Mountain Resort and looping through Brighton.

=== Guardsman Pass ===
After looping through Brighton, the route connects (with some backtracking) to a narrower mountain road across Guardsman Pass, terminating (with a non-state-maintained connection through to Park City via Utah State Route 224 (SR-224)and Midway/Heber City via SR-222) at the top of the pass as it enters Wasatch County. This part of the road is normally closed all winter.

== Legal definition ==
The legal definition of State Route 190 is as follows:

72-4-124. State highways—SR-186, SR-189, SR-190.
(3) SR-190. From Route 215 at Knudsen's Corner southeasterly to Route 210 at the mouth of Big Cottonwood Canyon; then easterly through Big Cottonwood Canyon to Brighton, including Brighton Loop; then easterly through Guardsman Pass to the Salt Lake-Wasatch County line.[3]

== History ==
The first piece of present SR-190 was added to the state highway system in 1933 as part of Utah State Route 152 (SR-152), which followed Highland Drive, 6200 South, and Big Cottonwood Canyon Road from Salt Lake City to the Uinta-Wasatch-Cache National Forest boundary in Big Cottonwood Canyon. In 1941, SR-152 was extended east in the forest to Brighton, and in 1945 the connection from Highland Drive to the canyon was moved south to Fort Union Boulevard. In order to provide access to the new Wasatch Mountain State Park, SR-152 was extended east from Brighton in 1963, following an existing county road over Guardsman Pass to end at SR-224. Finally, in 1987, a piece in the middle of SR-152, from I-215 south and east to Wasatch Boulevard (Utah State Route 210 [SR-210]), was removed from the state highway system. In its place was a proposed limited access road, extending 6200 South past I-215 and along Wasatch Boulevard to Big Cottonwood Canyon Road. To avoid an overlap of SR-152 on I-215, the new roadway became an extension of SR-210, and former SR-152 from Wasatch Boulevard to SR-224 became a new State Route 190. To avoid the necessity of remileposting SR-210, the new connection instead became part of SR-190 in 1988, bringing that route to its maximum extent: I-215 to SR-224. As part of a trade with Wasatch County in which the state took back what is now Utah State Route 32, and had been U.S. Route 189, from U.S. Route 40 south of the Jordanelle Reservoir to Francis, the east end of SR-190 was cut back to the Salt Lake–Wasatch County line in 1990.

== Major intersections ==
The entire route is in Salt Lake County.

Location	mi	km	Destinations	Notes
Holladay	0.000	0.000	East 6200 South (Big Cottonwood Road) east – SR-152 (Van Winkle/South Highland Drive)	Continuation west from western terminus
Holladay	0.000	0.000	East 6200 South (Big Cottonwood Road)	Western terminus: 40°38′18″N 111°48′37″W (at overhead direction sign at Knudsen's Corner)
Holladay	0.021– 0.182	0.034– 0.293	I-215 north – Millcreek, I-80 & SR-186 I-215 west – Murray, I-15, Salt Lake City, I-80, I-15	Single point urban interchange
Cottonwood Heights	1.830	2.945	SR-210 east (Wasatch Boulevard) – Granite, SR-209, Alta	Road heading west from intersection is Fort Union Boulevard
	19.934	32.081	Salt Lake–Wasatch county line	Eastern terminus: 40°36′24″N 111°33′18″W
	19.934	32.081	Guardsman Pass Road east – SR-224, Park City, Midway	Continuation east from eastern terminus
1.000 mi = 1.609 km; 1.000 km = 0.621 mi

== See also ==
- List of state highways in Utah
- List of named highway junctions in Utah
