= Guardsman (disambiguation) =

Guardsman is a military rank.

(The) Guardsman may also refer to:

== Films ==
- The Guardsman (1925 film), a 1925 Austrian film
- The Guardsman, a 1931 American film

== Other uses ==
- The Grenadier, a pub in London originally known as The Guardsman
- Guardsman, a soldier of the Guards Division of the British Army
- Guardsman, a tugboat originally named Empire Nina, renamed in 1947
- Guardsman (character), a character in Marvel Comics
- Vic Richardson (1894–1969), Australian cricketer nicknamed "The Guardsman"

== See also ==
- Guardsman Pass, a mountain pass in Utah, United States
- Panfilov's Twenty-Eight Guardsmen, a war memorial in Dubosekovo, Russia
- Son of the Guardsman, 1946 American film serial
