= Guardsman Pass =

Mountain pass in Utah, US

- Location within Utah
- Elevation: 9,717 feet (2,962 m)
- Traversed by: SR-190

Third Approach
- Location: Salt Lake / Wasatch counties, Utah, United States
- Range: Wasatch Mountains
- Coordinates: 40°36′23″N 111°33′18″W

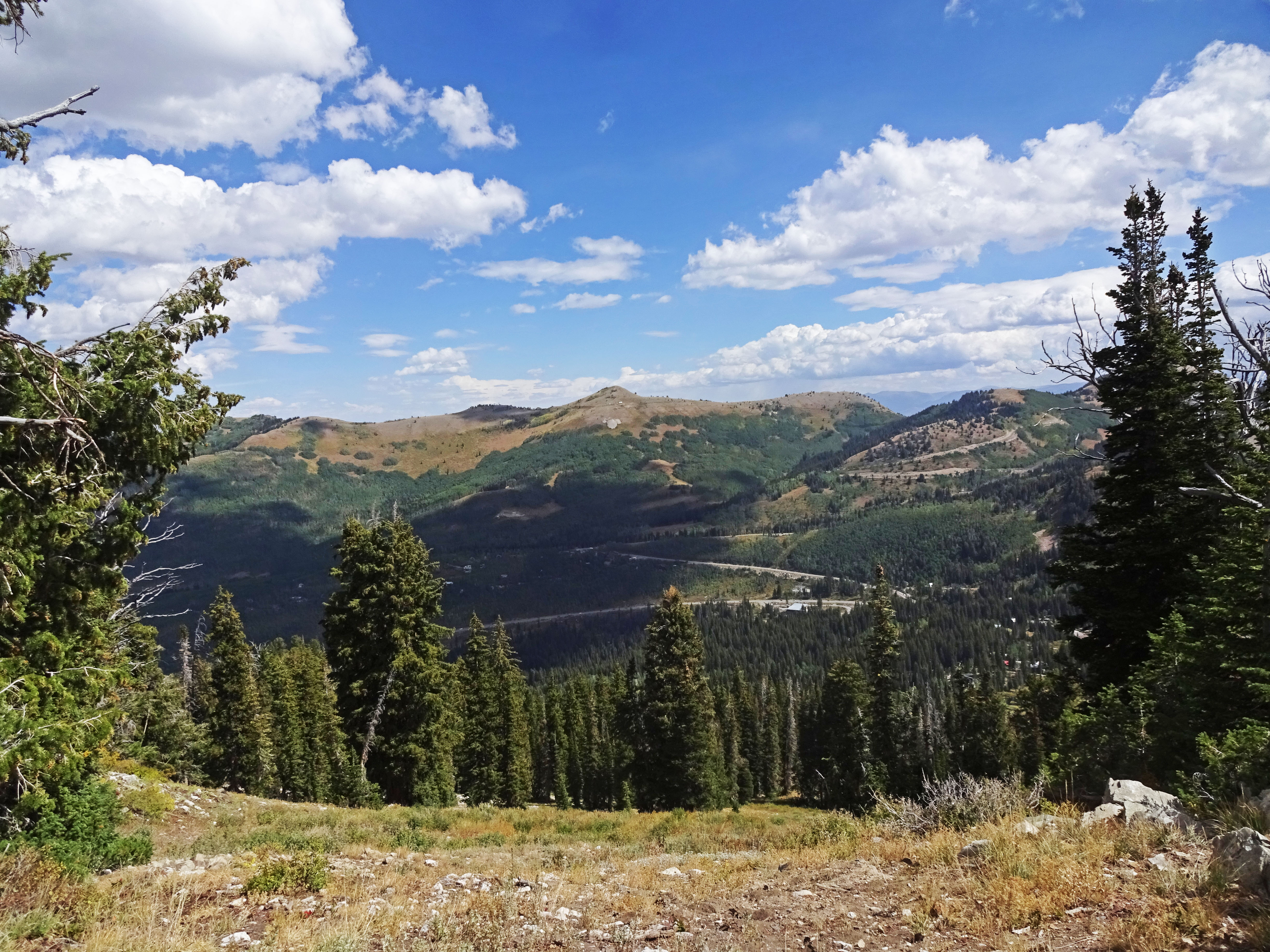
View of the Scott Hill and the Guardsman Pass on the right from Mount Evergreen

Guardsman Pass (elevation 9,717 feet (2,962 m) is a high mountain pass in the Wasatch Mountains of Utah. The pass is located on the boundaries of the Uinta-Wasatch-Cache National Forest (specifically the portion known as the Wasatch National Forest) to the west, and the Bonanza Flats backcountry area to the east.

It is located just south of Tri-County Peak, where Summit, Wasatch, and Salt Lake counties meet, and also provides summer hiking and winter snowmobiling access to Clayton Peak at the top of Brighton Ski Resort. It is also a trailhead for other trails in the area, though some are being moved due to the lack of space for parking and the limited sight distance for vehicles pulling out onto the roadway.

== Access ==
Guardsman Pass is traversed by Guardsman Pass Road, which is also designated as Utah 190 west (and formerly east) of the pass. Due to heavy amounts of snow at the high elevation of the pass, this road is closed in winter, generally from November to May but depending on actual conditions each year.

This road connects to Big Cottonwood Canyon on the west side of the pass. On the east side, it connects to Midway via Pine Canyon Road and Utah 222, and to Park City via Utah 224 over nearby Empire Pass.

Wasatch county paved the last unpaved section of the road over just a few days in late September 2018, also installing around 4,000 feet (1,200 m) of guard rail. This section from the pass to 224 is immediately below Pinyon Ridge (including Jupiter Hill) which divides Wasatch and Summit counties, and is the southern boundary for Park City Mountain Resort and part of Deer Valley Resort.
