= Étienne Provost =

Canadian fur trader active in central Utah

- Born: December 21, 1785; Chambly, Quebec
- Died: July 3, 1850 (aged 64); St. Louis, Missouri, U.S.
- Other names: Proveau, Provot
- Occupations: Frontiersman, explorer, trapper, guide
- Employer: American Fur Company
- Known for: Namesake of the Provo River, Provo Canyon, and Provo, Utah

Étienne Provost (December 21 1785 – July 3 1850) was a French-Canadian fur trader whose trapping and trading activities in the American southwest preceded Mexican independence. He was also known as Proveau and Provot. Leading a company headquartered in Taos, in what is today New Mexico, he was active in the Green River drainage and the central portion of modern Utah. He was one of the first people of European descent to see the Great Salt Lake, purportedly reaching its shores around 1824–25. However, Jim Bridger also reached the lake at about the same time, in late 1824, and maps from the 1600s may show the Great Salt Lake, possibly indicating European explorers reached the area over a century before Provost or Bridger.

== Early life ==
Provost was born December 21, 1785, in Chambly, Quebec, son of Albert Provost and Marie Anne Menard. He was baptized on December 21, 1785, at Saint-Joseph-de-Chambly Church, Chambly County, Quebec, but little is known about his early life. He made his home in St. Louis, Missouri for 10 years marveling at the Arkansas River as late 1814 with Joseph Philibert. He left there with Auguste Chouteau and Jules deMun. He was imprisoned at Santa Fe, New Mexico twice.

== Santa Fe trade ==
About 1822, he returned to New Mexico as one of the early traders. He formed a partnership with a certain Leclerc to trap in the Uinta Basin.

His party was attacked by Snake Indians in October 1824 at the Jordan River near its mouth at the Great Salt Lake. Eight men were lost, but Provost survived and established trading posts on the banks of both Utah Lake and the Great Salt Lake. The Jordan River was historically named Proveau's Fork.

Provost's company of trappers preceded the men of the Rocky Mountain Fur Company in the central Rocky Mountains. In May 1825, he met Peter Skene Ogden of the Hudson's Bay Company in Weber Canyon. After returning to St. Louis in 1826, he became an employee of John Jacob Astor's American Fur Company. He continued his trapping ventures, as well as leading AFC men on ventures on the upper Missouri River.

He married in 1829 but continued escorting AFC caravans to the annual rendezvous until 1838.

From 1839 until he died in 1850, he continued to recruit and escort the employees of the fur company and various private expeditions, including John Audubon's natural history expedition of 1843.

== Legacy ==
Provost's activities and explorations were well known among traders and settlers in the American Southwest. The Provo River and Provo Canyon in central Utah are named for the fur trader, as is the adjacent city of Provo.

St. Louis, Missouri was home to Provost for many years before his death on July 3, 1850. His funeral services and burial occurred at the Old Cathedral in St. Louis.

Provost is memorialized on the This Is the Place Monument in Salt Lake City.
