= Granite Hydroelectric Power Plant Historic District =

Historic district in Utah, United States

- U.S. National Register of Historic Places
- U.S. Historic district
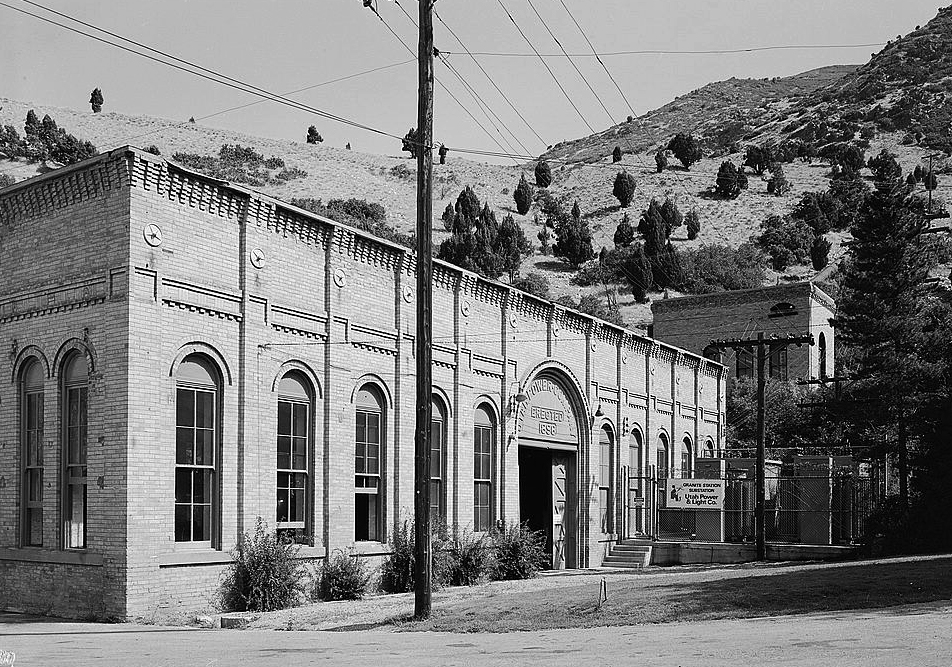
- Granite Power Station in 1971

- Location within Utah Location within the United States
- Location: Cottonwood Heights, Utah; United States
- Coordinates: 40°37′9″N 111°46′53″W
- Area: 1.6 acres (0.65 ha)
- Built: 1896
- Architectural style: Late Victorian, Renaissance
- MPS: Electric Power Plants of Utah MPS
- NRHP reference No.: 89000283
- Added to NRHP: April 20, 1989

The Granite Hydroelectric Power Station was built in 1896–1897 at the mouth of Big Cottonwood Canyon, about 6 miles (9.7 km) southeast of Salt Lake City, Utah, United States(in what is now eastern Cottonwood Heights. The plant comprises the powerhouse, transformer house, a wooden conduit, penstocks, and a small dam. Like the Stairs Station upstream, it represents an intact high-head generating plant from the late 19th century.

== Description ==
The powerhouse is a rectangular brick building on a concrete foundation, with extensive corbeling. The interior is a single room with two Pelton wheels flanking a generator, which replaced two older turbine-generator units. A work area in the station was powered by a 16 inches (41 cm) Pelton wheel driving a belt, an unusual feature. The ceiling is a peaked assembly of steel beams with an arched brick infill. Water is supplied through a steel conduit and penstock system with a 450-foot (140 m) head from the Stairs Station upstream. The dam, built in 1945, is part of neither historic district.

The transformer house is a plainer version of the power house. The operator's residence is nearby, built using the same sand-colored brick with extensive corbeling and a hipped roof. Two other residences of wood frame construction stand nearby, added in the 1920s. The present operator's residence is outside the historic district.

== History ==
The Granite Power Station was built beginning in 1896 by the Utah Power Company, owned by the Salt Lake City Railroad Company to provide power to the company's streetcar system. The station did not live up to expectations and was frequently out of service. After several changes of ownership, the plant passed into the hands of Utah Power and Light in 1912. PacifiCorp later took ownership in 1989 operating the site under its own name as well as the name Rocky Mountain Power.

The Granite Power Station was placed on the National Register of Historic Places on April 20, 1989.

== See also ==
- National Register of Historic Places listings in Salt Lake County, Utah
- Stairs Station Hydroelectric Power Plant Historic District
