= Soldier Hollow (Utah) =

Hollow in Wasatch County, Utah

- Location within Utah Location within the United States
- Floor elevation: 5,640 ft (1,720 m)

Geography
- Location: Wasatch Mountain State Park; Wasatch County, Utah; United States
- Coordinates: 40°28′32″N 111°30′04″W
- Interactive map of Soldier Hollow

Soldier Hollow is a small hollow in the Wasatch Range that is located within the Wasatch Mountain State Park in northwestern Wasatch County, Utah, United States.

The hollow was formerly a Native American encampment and was later used by a group of Army surveyors in the 1850s. While the hollow is fairly small, it is most notable for the Soldier Hollow winter sports venue that is located at the mouth of the hollow (and that was named after the hollow). The venue was created for the 2002 Winter Olympics and hosted the biathlon, cross-country skiing, and the cross country skiing portion of the Nordic combined events and is still in use.

== See also ==
- List of canyons and gorges in Utah
- Soldier Hollow station
