= Utah State Route 222 =

State highway in Utah, United States

State Route 222
- SR-222 highlighted in red

Route information
- Maintained by UDOT
- Length: 3.361 mi (5.409 km)
- Existed: (1941 – 2004 as part of SR-224); 2004–present

Major junctions
- South end: SR-113 in Midway
- North end: Gate past Pine Creek Campground

Location
- Country: United States
- State: Utah
- Counties: Wasatch

Highway system
- Utah State Highway System; Interstate; US; State; Minor; Scenic
← SR-219	→ SR-224

State Route 222 (SR-222) is a state highway in the U.S. state of Utah. Spanning 3.3 miles (5.3 km), it connects the city of Midway on Utah 113 with Wasatch Mountain State Park, and non-state-maintained connections to Park City and Brighton via Empire Pass and Guardsman Pass.

== Route description ==
The route begins in the Heber Valley - part of the Wasatch Back - at the intersection of Main Street and Center Street in the city of Midway and heads west along Main Street through from the center of town through shops and homes. After two blocks, the route turns north on 200 West Street and turns west again two blocks later onto 200 North street. After travelling west for 0.6 miles (0.97 km) through residential communities, the route turns again to the north along Homestead Drive, passing by the Homestead Resort, Homestead caldera and the Utah Golf Resort and leaving the city limits. Just outside Midway, Homestead Drive curves to the west at the entrance of Wasatch Mountain State Park. At this point, State Route 222 turns right onto Warm Springs Road to continue north, taking a jog to the east to skirt the east edge of the golf course on the state park (staying on Homestead westward is the route of former SR-220). As it passes the golf course, the route merges with Pine Canyon Road and resumes its northward direction, passing the Wasatch Mountain State Park Campground as it begins to climb out of the valley and follow Pine Creek into the foothills of the eastern Wasatch Range. Just after passing the campgrounds, the route ends at the pavement change coincident with a gate.

The remainder of the road, which is closed in the winter and not designated as part of the state route, continues north to meet with other roads that provide access to Park City in Summit County via SR-224 to the north over Empire Pass, and Brighton in Salt Lake County via SR-190 to the west via Guardsman Pass.

== History ==
The southern portion of SR-222 was initially designated as Utah State Route 224 in 1941, running from SR-113 in Midway north to Schneitter's Hot Pots, now the Homestead Resort. In 1953, the route was extended north to the boundary of Wasatch Mountain State Park. This extent of SR-224 is what now comprises SR-222. Incidentally, SR-224 was extended again in 1963 farther north over Empire Pass to Park City, and yet again in 1969 north all the way to I-80 at Kimball Junction.

In 1990, the state and Wasatch County executed a trade, wherein SR-32 around the south side of the Jordanelle Reservoir was restored to the state highway system (it had carried U.S. 189 until the reservoir forced its relocation), and portions of SR-190, SR-220, and SR-224 became county roads. In particular, SR-224 was removed from the state highway system between the Pine Creek Campground (near the state park boundary) and the Wasatch/Summit county line. The unconnected southern portion between SR-113 and the campground, however, remained part of SR-224 until 2004, when it was redesignated as SR-222 to eliminate confusion.

== Major intersections ==
The entire route is in Wasatch County.

Location	mi	km	Destinations	Notes
Midway	0.000	0.000	SR-113 (Center Street)	Southern terminus
	2.301	3.703	Warm Springs Road	Former SR-220
	3.361	5.409	Gate and pavement change	Northern terminus
1.000 mi = 1.609 km; 1.000 km = 0.621 mi
