= Stairs Station Hydroelectric Power Plant Historic District =

Historic district in Utah, United States

- U.S. National Register of Historic Places
- U.S. Historic district
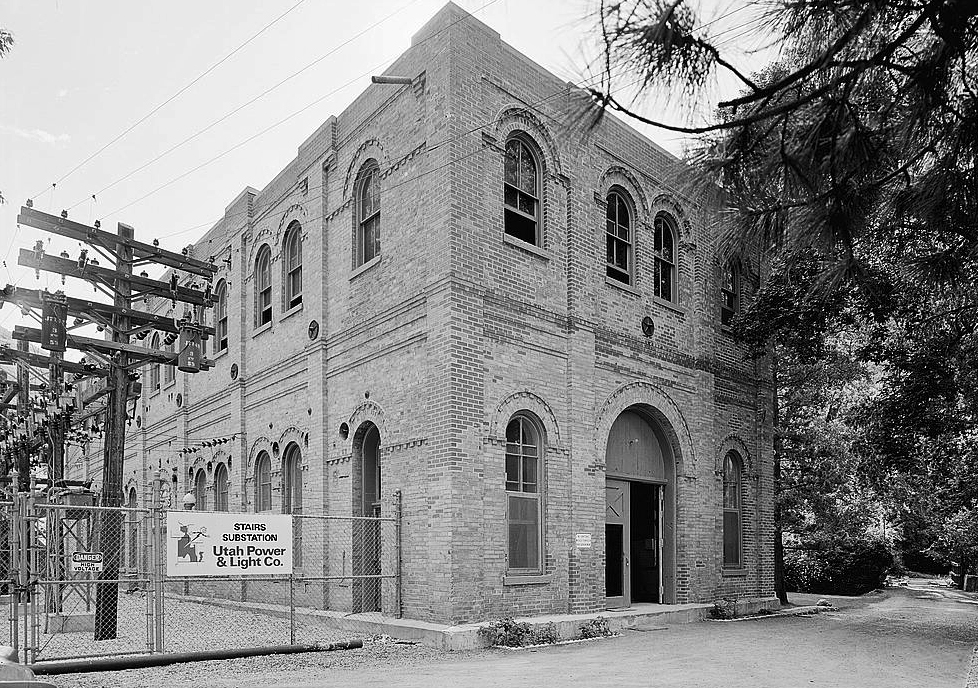
- Stairs Power Station in 1971

- Location within Utah Location within the United States
- Location: Big Cottonwood Canyon; Salt Lake County, Utah; United States
- Nearest city: Cottonwood Heights
- Coordinates: 40°37′30.6″N 111°44′38.9″W
- Area: 6.4 acres (2.6 ha)
- Built: 1896
- Built by: Big Cottonwood Power Company
- Architect: Jones, R.M.
- Architectural style: Renaissance style
- MPS: Electric Power Plants of Utah MPS
- NRHP reference No.: 89000284
- Added to NRHP: April 20, 1989

The Stairs Station Hydroelectric Power Plant was built in 1894-1895 in Big Cottonwood Canyon, about 8 miles (13 km) southeast of Salt Lake City, Utah. The plant comprises the powerhouse, switchyard, penstocks, and a pipeline. A dam next to the site is associated with the Granite Power Plant farther downstream, and is part of neither historic district. The powerhouse is the only remaining building associated with the plant. It is an example of an intact high-head generating plant from the late 19th century.

== Description ==
The power plant was originally built with four Pelton wheels, since replaced by a single Francis turbine capable of generating 1.2 megawatts. The station was designed in the Second Renaissance Revival style with two levels, the lower housing the generating equipment, the upper formerly housing switchgear.

Until the late 1950s water was impounded behind the Storm Mountain Dam, built in 1921 to replace an earlier dam about 2,500 feet (760 m) above the station horizontally and 200 feet (61 m) vertically. The dam is a low earthfill structure, about 10 feet (3.0 m) to 20 feet (6.1 m) high and 500 feet (150 m) long, concrete faced on the upstream side. A 1,200-foot (370 m) steel pipeline, now abandoned, connected the dam to a penstock that made the fall to the power plant. The penstock is about 1,750 feet (530 m) long, made of .5-inch (1.3 cm) steel, with a non-contributing standpipe at its head

== History ==
The station was designed by Robert M. Jones for his Big Cottonwood Power Company at a cost of $325,000. In 1895 the company contracted to provide power to the Salt Lake and Ogden Gas and Electric Company, In 1897 the Big Cottonwood company was absorbed into the Union Light and Power Company in 1899. An operator's house was demolished on the site at an unknown date.

The Stairs Station was placed on the National Register of Historic Places on April 20, 1989.

== See also ==
- National Register of Historic Places listings in Salt Lake County, Utah
- Granite Hydroelectric Power Plant Historic District
