= Deer Creek State Park (Utah) =

State park in Utah, United States

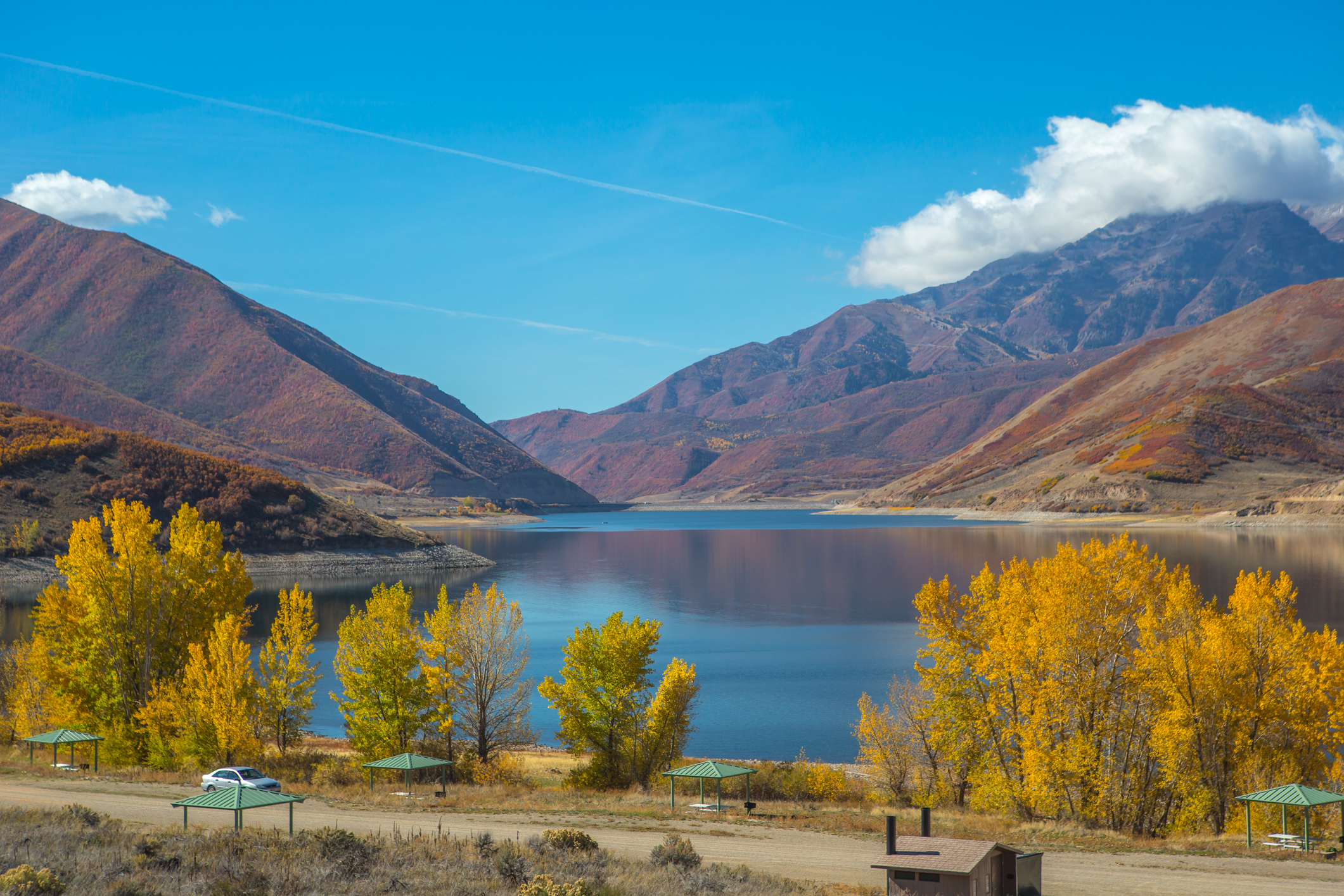
- The Rainbow Bay day use area with the Deer Creek Reservoir and Mount Timpanogos in the background

- Location within Utah Location within the United States
- Interactive map of Deer Creek State Park
- Location: Wasatch County, Utah, United States
- Coordinates: 40°24′50″N 111°30′20″W
- Area: 3,260 acres (1,320 ha)
- Elevation: 5,400 ft (1,600 m)
- Opened: 1971
- Operator: Utah State Parks
- Visitors: 659,116 (in 2025)
- Website: Official website
- Utah State Parks

Deer Creek State Park is a state park in south western Wasatch County, Utah, United States, featuring large Deer Creek Dam and Reservoir. The park is located near the town of Charleston in the southwest corner of the Heber Valley.

== Description ==
Established as a state park in 1971, the 3,260-acre (1,320 ha) park features the large Deer Creek Reservoir, which is popular for fishing and sun tanning, along with other surface water sports such as boating, sailing, swimming, and windsurfing. The park is at an elevation of 5,400 feet (1,600 m).

Park facilities include two concrete ramps for boat-launching, a summer-only 75-unit campground (58 sites for RVs and the remainder for tents), rest rooms, showers, and sewage-disposal, two group-use areas, picnic areas, and fish cleaning stations. There is also a restaurant and gas station, and boat rentals are available.

Most of the multiple areas of the park are accessible directly from U.S. Route 189 (US-189), which runs near the eastern and southern shores of the reservoir. However, Utah State Route 314 provides additional access from US-189 to the facilities on the southern shore.

== History ==
In the 1930s the Salt Lake City area and surrounding farmland were suffering from water shortages. Creation of a reservoir was approved by the United States Congress in 1935 to help alleviate this problem, and Deer Creek Reservoir became a significant part of the Provo River Project.

The Bureau of Reclamation (BOR) began construction of the reservoir in the spring of 1938. Water was available for use in 1941, and the project was completed in 1955. The Provo River Water Users Association, under contract with the BOR, repaid construction costs, and operated and maintained the facilities until the area became a state park in 1971. During this time, fishing was the chief recreational activity, as other water sports were prohibited.

The Division of Parks and Recreation became responsible for the administration, development, and operation of the park in January 1971.

== See also ==
- List of Utah State Parks
