= Wasatch Mountain State Park =

State park in Utah, USA

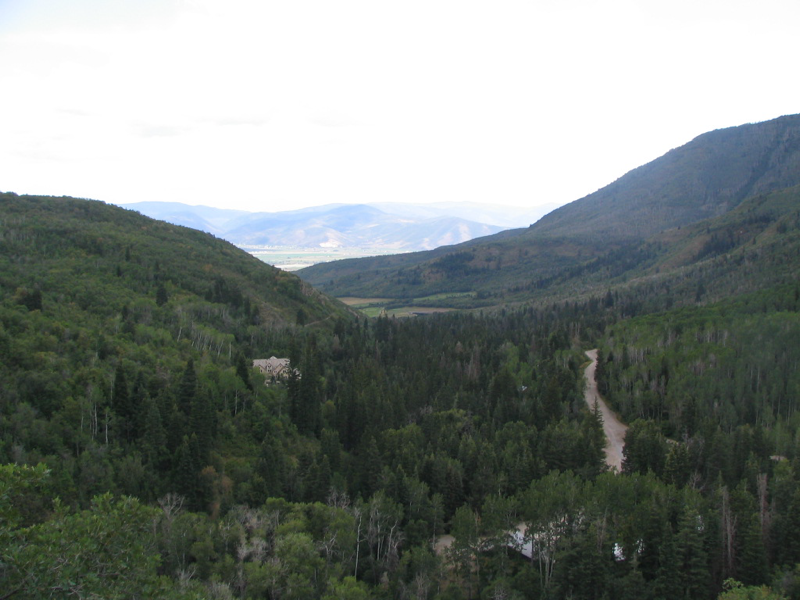

- Location within Utah Location within the United States
- Interactive map of Wasatch Mountain State Park
- Location: Wasatch County, Utah, United States
- Coordinates: 40°30′10″N 111°32′14″W
- Area: 21,592 acres (8,738 ha)
- Elevation: 5,900 ft (1,800 m)
- Established: 1961
- Opened: 1968
- Administrator: Utah State Parks
- Visitors: 778,842 (in 2025)
- Named for: The Wasatch Range
- Website: Official website
- Utah State Parks

Wasatch Mountain State Park is a state park of Utah, United States, in the northern part of the state within the Wasatch Back area on the north and west edges of the Heber Valley, in Wasatch County, near the city of Midway.

== Description ==
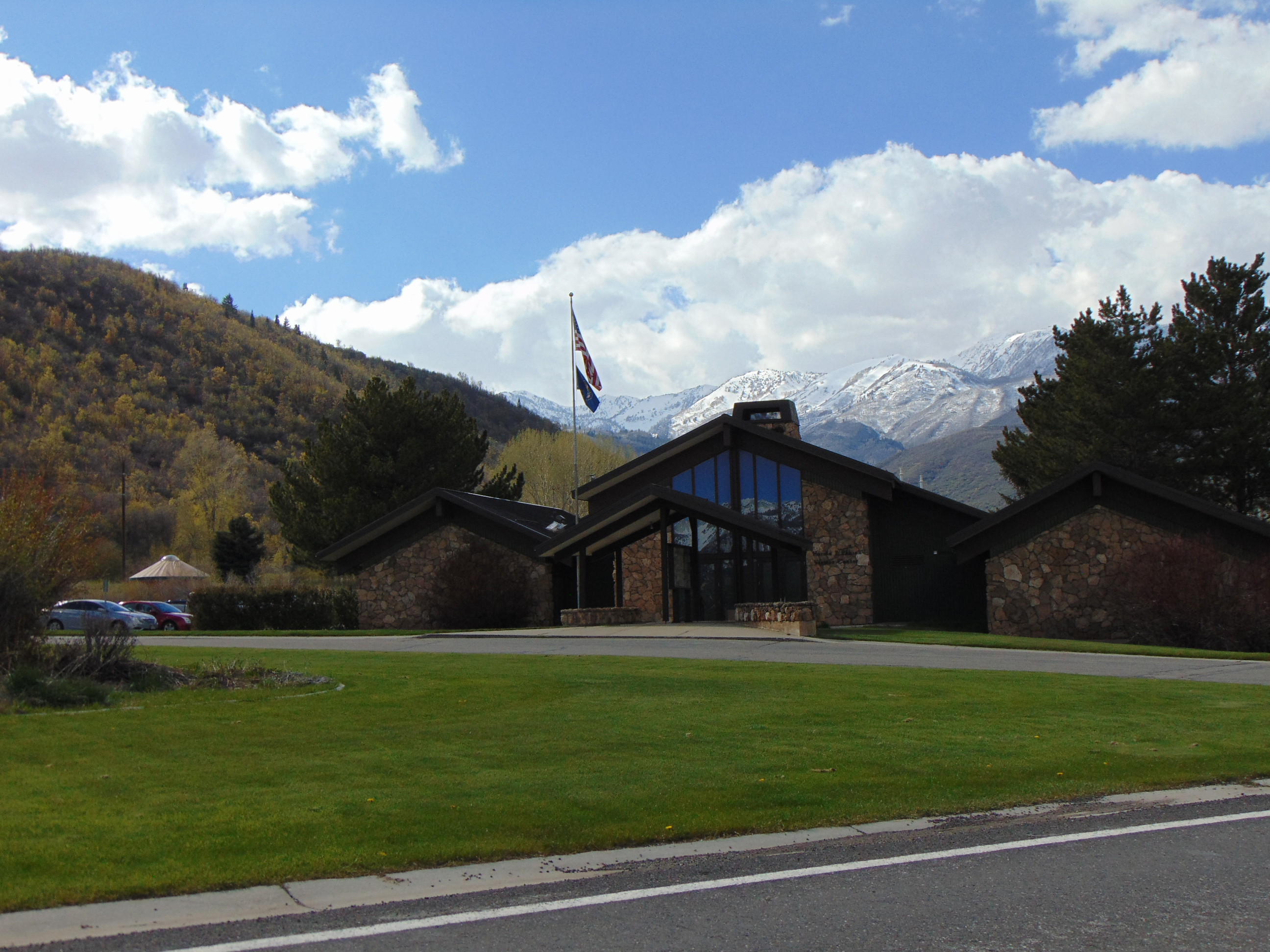
Wasatch Mountain State Park Visitors Center, April 2016

Established in 1961, Wasatch Mountain State Park is Utah's most developed state park. Named for the Wasatch Mountains, (Note: Although the wording of the name of the Wasatch Mountain State Park may seem to imply it is named after or related to the "Wasatch Mountain", the only mountain so named is located over 300 miles (480 km) to the southeast in San Miguel County in southwest Colorado. Therefore, it is a "mountain state park" that is given the specific name of "Wasatch", after the Wasatch Range, in general.) the park consists of 21,592 acres (8,738 ha) and sits at an elevation of 5,900 feet (1,800 m). Wildlife in the park includes deer, elk, wild turkeys, and moose. Although the southern part of Wasatch Mountain State Park is adjacent to the northeast part of Deer Creek State Park, the two share only a short border.

=== Park facilities ===
Wasatch Mountain State Park is used for mountain activities such as camping, picnicking, hiking, off-road vehicle use, horseback riding, Nordic skiing, snow tubing, and snowmobiling. It is also home to Wasatch Mountain and Soldier Hollow golf courses. Unlike most of Utah's state parks, it is not related to a body of water (reservoir, lake, etc.).

There are 139 campsites at the park, two pavilions for group use, restrooms, showers, and utility hookups.

Soldier Hollow hosted some of the events of the 2002 Winter Olympics. The venue remains open to the public, offering Nordic skiing, tubing, snowshoeing, a summer and winter biathlon, and in-line skating facilities.

=== Access ===
The park has three sections, each with a different access route. (Note: In addition to the access routes indicated, U.S. Route 40/U.S. Route 189 very briefly passes through the northeastern edge of the park, but there is no direct access to any part of the park from that highway.) The main part of the park, including the headquarters/visitors' center, campgrounds, and Wasatch Golf Course, is most easily reached by Utah State Route 222 (east Main Street) from Midway. It may also be accessed (except during the winter and early spring) by way of Pine Canyon Road from Guardsman Pass Road (from Big Cottonwood Canyon) or Utah State Route 224 (from Park City). The Soldier Hollow portion, which includes the cross-country ski resort and Soldier Hallow Golf Course, is most easily accessed by taking Tate Road (from Utah State Route 113 in Charleston) and turning south on Stringtown Road. (Until 1990, this route was designated as Utah State Route 220.) Dutch Hollow, the least visited area, which includes a hiking trail, is reached via Dutch Canyon Road from River Road on Midway's eastern edge.

== Climate ==
Climate data for Snake Creek Powerhouse, Utah, 1991–2020 normals, 1913-2020 extremes: 6010ft (1832m)
Month	Jan	Feb	Mar	Apr	May	Jun	Jul	Aug	Sep	Oct	Nov	Dec	Year
Record high °F (°C)	56 (13)	63 (17)	73 (23)	83 (28)	100 (38)	97 (36)	102 (39)	100 (38)	94 (34)	85 (29)	71 (22)	65 (18)	102 (39)
Mean maximum °F (°C)	48.9 (9.4)	52.7 (11.5)	63.9 (17.7)	74.4 (23.6)	83.3 (28.5)	90.4 (32.4)	95.8 (35.4)	93.7 (34.3)	87.8 (31.0)	76.9 (24.9)	61.7 (16.5)	50.7 (10.4)	94.8 (34.9)
Mean daily maximum °F (°C)	35.6 (2.0)	39.7 (4.3)	48.9 (9.4)	56.7 (13.7)	66.4 (19.1)	78.4 (25.8)	88.2 (31.2)	84.6 (29.2)	75.0 (23.9)	61.5 (16.4)	45.7 (7.6)	35.0 (1.7)	59.6 (15.4)
Daily mean °F (°C)	24.8 (−4.0)	27.1 (−2.7)	36.5 (2.5)	42.8 (6.0)	51.8 (11.0)	61.1 (16.2)	67.6 (19.8)	64.5 (18.1)	56.9 (13.8)	46.4 (8.0)	34.0 (1.1)	24.8 (−4.0)	44.9 (7.2)
Mean daily minimum °F (°C)	14.0 (−10.0)	14.6 (−9.7)	24.1 (−4.4)	29.0 (−1.7)	37.3 (2.9)	43.8 (6.6)	47.0 (8.3)	44.5 (6.9)	38.9 (3.8)	31.4 (−0.3)	22.3 (−5.4)	14.6 (−9.7)	30.1 (−1.1)
Mean minimum °F (°C)	−4.1 (−20.1)	−2.9 (−19.4)	7.0 (−13.9)	16.0 (−8.9)	24.0 (−4.4)	30.1 (−1.1)	38.3 (3.5)	37.2 (2.9)	26.6 (−3.0)	17.1 (−8.3)	3.0 (−16.1)	−3.5 (−19.7)	−8.3 (−22.4)
Record low °F (°C)	−28 (−33)	−34 (−37)	−15 (−26)	−4 (−20)	14 (−10)	21 (−6)	26 (−3)	26 (−3)	14 (−10)	0 (−18)	−14 (−26)	−29 (−34)	−34 (−37)
Average precipitation inches (mm)	2.79 (71)	2.41 (61)	2.02 (51)	1.56 (40)	2.00 (51)	1.13 (29)	0.74 (19)	1.23 (31)	1.56 (40)	1.99 (51)	1.99 (51)	2.33 (59)	21.75 (554)
Average snowfall inches (cm)	23.30 (59.2)	22.70 (57.7)	9.10 (23.1)	2.30 (5.8)	0.60 (1.5)	0.00 (0.00)	0.00 (0.00)	0.00 (0.00)	0.20 (0.51)	0.70 (1.8)	16.10 (40.9)	27.30 (69.3)	102.3 (259.81)
Source 1: NOAA (1981-2010 snowfall)
Source 2: XMACIS2 (records & monthly max/mins)

== History ==
Wasatch Mountain State Park has three historic features. The restored Tate Barn, at the park's southern end, is a recognized landmark and Heber Valley symbol. It is a classic wooden barn built in the 1890s. Huber Grove, a 100-year-old apple orchard, features the Huber Farmhouse and Creamery. The third feature is the Snake Creek Hydroelectric Power Plant Historic District, but most of the district is not directly accessible to the public.

== See also ==
- List of Utah State Parks
