= Soldier Hollow =

Cross-country skiing park in Wasatch Mountain State Park, Utah

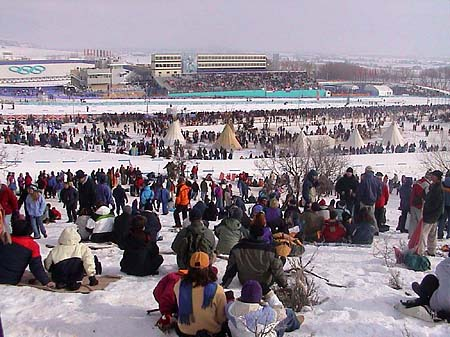
- The venue during the 2002 Winter Olympics, February 2002
- Interactive map of Soldier Hollow
- Location: Wasatch Mountain State Park; Wasatch County, Utah; United States
- Nearest city: Midway, Utah
- Coordinates: 40°28′45″N 111°29′50″W
- Vertical: 419 ft (128 m)
- Top elevation: 5,882 ft (1,793 m)
- Base elevation: 5,463 ft (1,665 m)
- Skiable area: 134 acres (54 ha)
- Trails: 14
- Longest run: Olympic 3.1 mi (5.0 km)
- Total length: 19 mi (31 km)
- Lift system: 1 (surface tow tubing hill)
- Terrain parks: No
- Snowmaking: Yes (along 3.1 mi (5.0 km) of trails)
- Night skiing: No
- Website: www.soldierhollow.com

Soldier Hollow is a cross-country ski venue located at the mouth of a hollow of the same name about 53 miles (85 km) southeast of Salt Lake City in Wasatch Mountain State Park in northwestern Wasatch County, Utah, United States. The venue was created for the 2002 Winter Olympics and hosted the biathlon, cross-country skiing, and the cross country skiing portion of the Nordic combined events, a role it is expected to reprise for the 2034 Winter Olympics.

Since hosting the Olympics, it has been developed as a cross-country skiing, tubing, and snowshoeing venue, while featuring mountain biking and golfing in the summer. On May 1, 2016, the venue operation contract transferred from the Soldier Hollow Legacy Foundation to the Utah Olympic Legacy Foundation, which owns and operates several Olympic and Paralympic legacy venues elsewhere in the state.

== History ==
=== Pre-Olympics ===
Soldier Hollow is located in the southeasternmost part of Wasatch Mountain State Park, a 21,592 acres (8,738 ha) nature preserve created in 1961, which became a state park in 1968.

The venue received its name from the hollow at the mouth of which it is located. (Note: Some sources have asserted that the Soldier Hollow area was not identified as such until it was so named by the 2002 Olympic organizers. Furthermore, such sources claim, the name was chosen because of its proximity to Soldier Springs, a summer campsite used by Ute Indians, U.S. Army surveyors of the 1850s, and others. However, while site was used by Native Americans and Army surveyors, the Solder Springs referred to are located in Wasatch County, Utah, they are situated on south-central Wasatch County on the northeastern edge of the Strawberry Valley, about 32 miles (51 km) southwest of Soldier Hollow. In addition, the United States Geological Survey (USGS) indicates that the hollow was named as such at least decades before, with the name appearing on USGS maps at least as early as 1948.) Prior to becoming a state park, certain locations within the park were used for farming and cattle grazing, while much of the remainder was used recreationally by locals. In the last quarter of the 20th century, the state park service had been approached by private developers hoping to build luxury hotels, golf courses, and other attractions within the park, but none of these plans (except the golf course) ever came to fruition. The 36-hole Soldier Hollow Golf Course, built just north of the sports venue (on the north side of West Soldier Hollow Lane), was completed in July 2004 and supplemented the exiting 36-hole Wasatch Mountain Golf Course (located farther north in the state park).

=== Venue development ===
The Soldier Hollow venue was one of only three which were built and designed by the Salt Lake Organizing Committee (SLOC) specifically for the 2002 Winter Olympics; with the others being the Utah Olympic Park and Utah Olympic Oval. The Soldier Hollow location was chosen by SLOC as an Olympic venue in October 1997, over several other possible locations including Sherwood Hills near Logan, Utah. Preliminary work began soon after the venue site was chosen, but major construction didn't start until 1999. Work at the venue had been completed enough (80% complete) to host its first major event, U.S. Cross Country Skiing Championships, on January 8, 2000. Construction on the venue's day lodge began with a groundbreaking ceremony on July 5, 2000. The lodge was completed in December 2000 and dedicated on January 5, 2001. The venue cost SLOC $22 million USD (equivalent to $39.3 million in 2025) to construct.

=== 2002 Winter Olympics & Paralympics ===
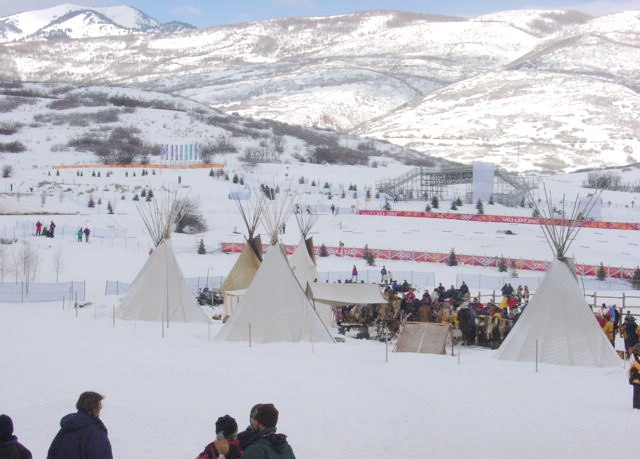
Part of the venue's Western Experience during the 2002 Olympics, February 2002

During the 2002 games Soldier Hollow hosted the biathlon, cross-country skiing, and Nordic combined events. The venue itself hosted 64,160 biathlon spectators, 99,320 cross-country spectators, and 1,794 Nordic combined spectators during these events. During the 2002 Winter Paralympics the venue hosted the biathlon and cross-country events.

Soldier Hollow was the furthest venue from Salt Lake City with an estimated drive time of 2-2.5 hours from downtown during the games. Because of this distance from any large population centers, a special Western Experience was created at the venue's spectator plaza to give visitors activities to do between competitions. The Western Experience included music and entertainment, a mountain rendezvous, pioneer reenactments, cowboy camps, wild mustang exhibit and American Indian displays, along with concession stands.

In order to help cut down on vehicle traffic in the local canyons during the games, and to give spectators a unique experience, SLOC reached an agreement with the historic Heber Valley Railroad to transport spectators to the Soldier Hollow venue. A special station was constructed along the railroad tracks near the venue which would allow for two to four trains, carrying 200 passengers each, per day. The Heber Valley Railroad's numbers 618 and 75 steam-engines, were joined by the Nevada Northern Railway Museum's number 93 steam-engine, in pulling eight-car trains full of passengers, to the Soldier Hollow depot where they disembarked and continued to the venue entrance on a horse-drawn sleigh.

=== 2034 Winter Olympics & Paralympics ===
Soldier Hollow is slated to again host hosted the biathlon, cross-country skiing, and the cross country skiing portion of the Nordic combined events during the 2034 Winter Olympics.

== The venue today ==
The site has been developed as a cross-country skiing, tubing, and snowshoeing venue with nearby horse-pulled sleigh riding during the winter months, while featuring mountain biking, golfing, a popular music festival and an international sheepdog competition in the summer. It is owned by the State of Utah and part of Wasatch Mountain State Park. The Division of State Parks and Recreation contracted management of the venue to a non-profit foundation.

=== Music festival ===
The Wasatch Mountain Music Festival was held at Soldier Hollow on July 14–16, 2017. Under the direction and management of Vibrant America and the Utah Olympic Legacy Foundation, this festival of Americana music - bluegrass, country, Texas swing, folk, gypsy jazz - has an ideal setting within a Wasatch Mountain cove. The large grassy staging area had two stages for non-stop music with a talented and diverse lineup of national recording artists and favorite local performers.

There were overnight camping spaces, vendor booths and food court, family hiking or biking trails, and nearby horseback riding or covered wagon rides, along with a pioneer living history encampment with children activities. The Heber Valley Railroad scheduled a special "music train" to bring patrons to the event. With a mission to educate as well as entertain, the Wasatch Mountain Music Festival offered workshops from professionals, singer/songwriter showcases, music activities for children and opportunities for all musicians to jam and build relationships.

In 2018, the music festival was held at the Zermatt Resort in nearby Midway.

=== Sheepdog competition ===
The site is also home to the Soldier Hollow Classic Sheepdog Championship and Festival. From its inception until 2022 the invite-only sheep herding competition was held on Labor Day weekend each year to coincide with the Swiss Festival held in nearby Midway, Utah. Due to facility construction for the upcoming winter Olympics, the event was not held in 2023. When it returned in 2024 the event was moved to Memorial Day weekend when the weather is usually cooler. Called the "world's foremost sheepdog trial" with some 28,000 people in attendance. While the event is not sanctioned by the United States Border Collie Handlers Association, it is well supported by the regional community and considered one of the premier sheep herding events in North America alongside the Bluegrass Classic in Lexington, KY and the Meeker Classic in Meeker, CO.
