= Provo River =

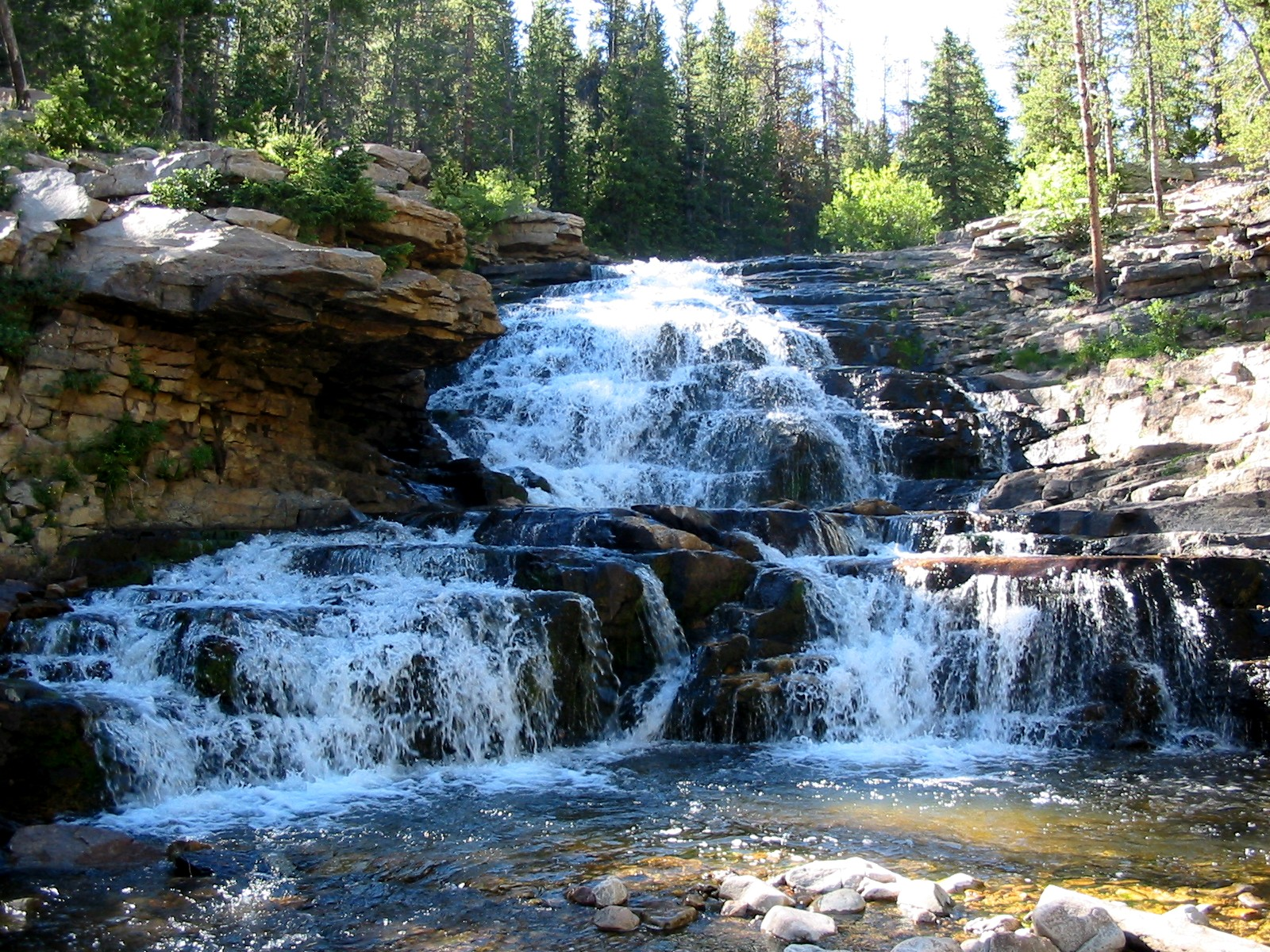
- Upper Provo River

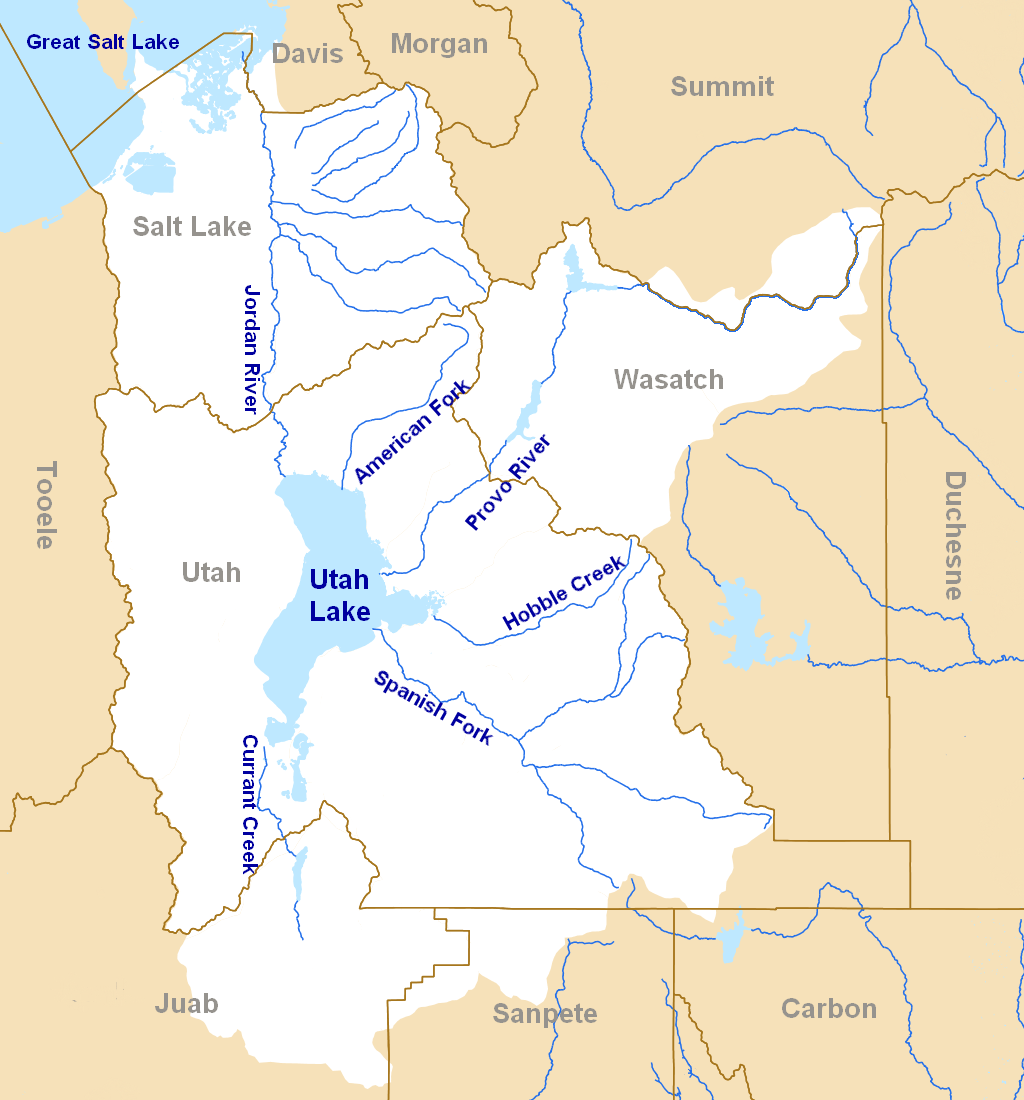

- Location of the mouth of the Provo River in Utah

Location
- Country: United States
- State: Utah
- County: Utah, Wasatch, and Summit

Physical characteristics
- Source: Uinta Mountains
  - location: near Mount Watson, Summit County, Utah
  - coordinates: 40°41′39″N 110°57′38″W
  - elevation: 10,448 ft (3,185 m)
- Mouth: Utah Lake
  - location: Provo, Utah County, Utah
  - coordinates: 40°14′12″N 111°44′20″W
  - elevation: 4,485 ft (1,367 m)
- Length: 80 miles (130 km)
- Basin size: 673 sq mi (1,740 km^{2})
- Discharge
  - location: near Provo, 2.1 miles (3.4 km) from the mouth
  - average: 200 cu ft/s (5.7 m^{3}/s)
  - minimum: 0 cu ft/s (0 m^{3}/s)
  - maximum: 2,520 cu ft/s (71 m^{3}/s)

The Provo River (Ute: Timpanoquint, “Rock River) is located in Utah County and Wasatch County, Utah, in the United States. It rises in the Uinta Mountains at Wall Lake and flows about 71 miles (114 km) southwest to Utah Lake at the city of Provo, Utah.

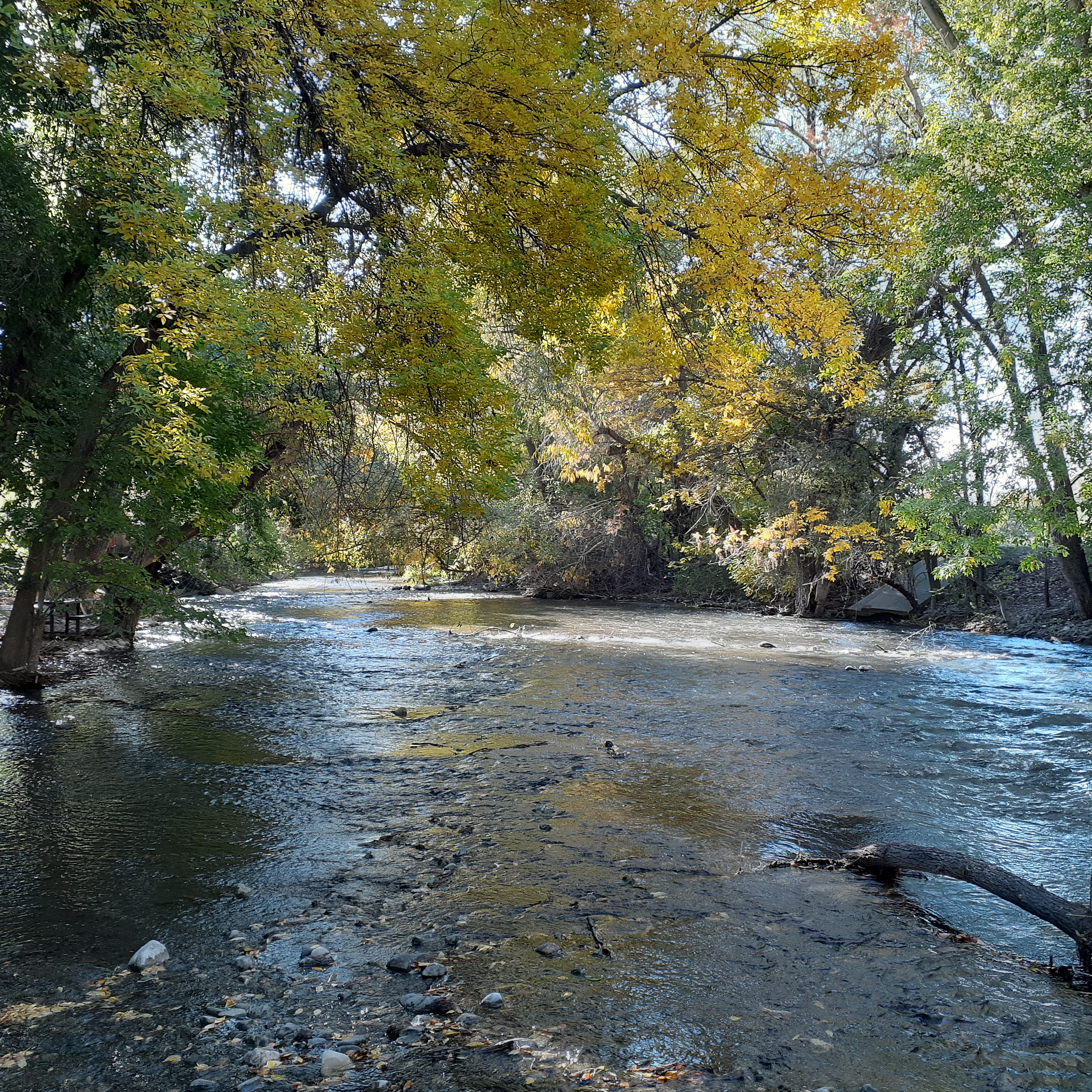
Looking downstream on the lower Provo River in the fall.

== Course ==
The two main branches of Provo River are the North Fork Provo River and the South Fork Provo River. The river is impounded by Jordanelle Reservoir at the north end of the Heber Valley. Deer Creek Dam further impounds the Provo River with Deer Creek Reservoir, built-in 1941. The two branches of Provo are split into upper, middle, and lower sections. The upper Provo originates in the high Uintas and flows into Jordanelle Reservoir. Below the dam of Jordanelle to Deer Creek Reservoir is known as the Middle Provo River. The Middle Provo is joined on the right by Snake Creek, which includes the Midway Fish Hatchery. The lower section of the Provo River flows out of Deer Creek Reservoir through Provo Canyon and into Utah Lake.

== History ==
Before European-American colonization, Ute Indians called the river Timpanoquint, meaning "water running over rocks." Early settlers changed the name to Provo, after trapper Etienne Provost, for whom the city of Provo, Utah is also named. In addition to Provost, the Quebec-born fur trapper was known as Proveau, and Provot (and the pronunciation was "Provo"). The old name for the river was instead given to the mountain to the north, which later became known as Mount Timpanogos.

In February 1850 the river was the site of what is sometimes called the Provo River Massacre, a siege and massacre by Latter-day Saint (LDS) militiamen of an encampment of Timpanogos families. Between 40 and 100 Native American people were killed in the attack or executed as prisoners, and over 40 Timpanogos children, women, and a few men were taken and sold as slaves to Mormon pioneers in the Salt Lake Valley.

In the 1930s, irrigation usage and drought had shrunk Utah Lake from 850,000 acre-feet down to 20,000, prompting a reworking of irrigation systems and the creation of the Provo River Project, later called the Provo River Water Users Association. Through the Project, river management features were added, including the Deer Creek Dam and Reservoir—with a reservoir capacity of 152,864 acre-feet—and Duchesne Diversion tunnel allowing water from the Duchesne River to be diverted into the Provo River at certain times. The Association today maintains and operates these control and irrigation systems and monitors water flows.

According to the United States Geological Survey (USGS), variant names for Provo River include Tim-pan-o-gos River and Upper Provo River.

== Activities ==
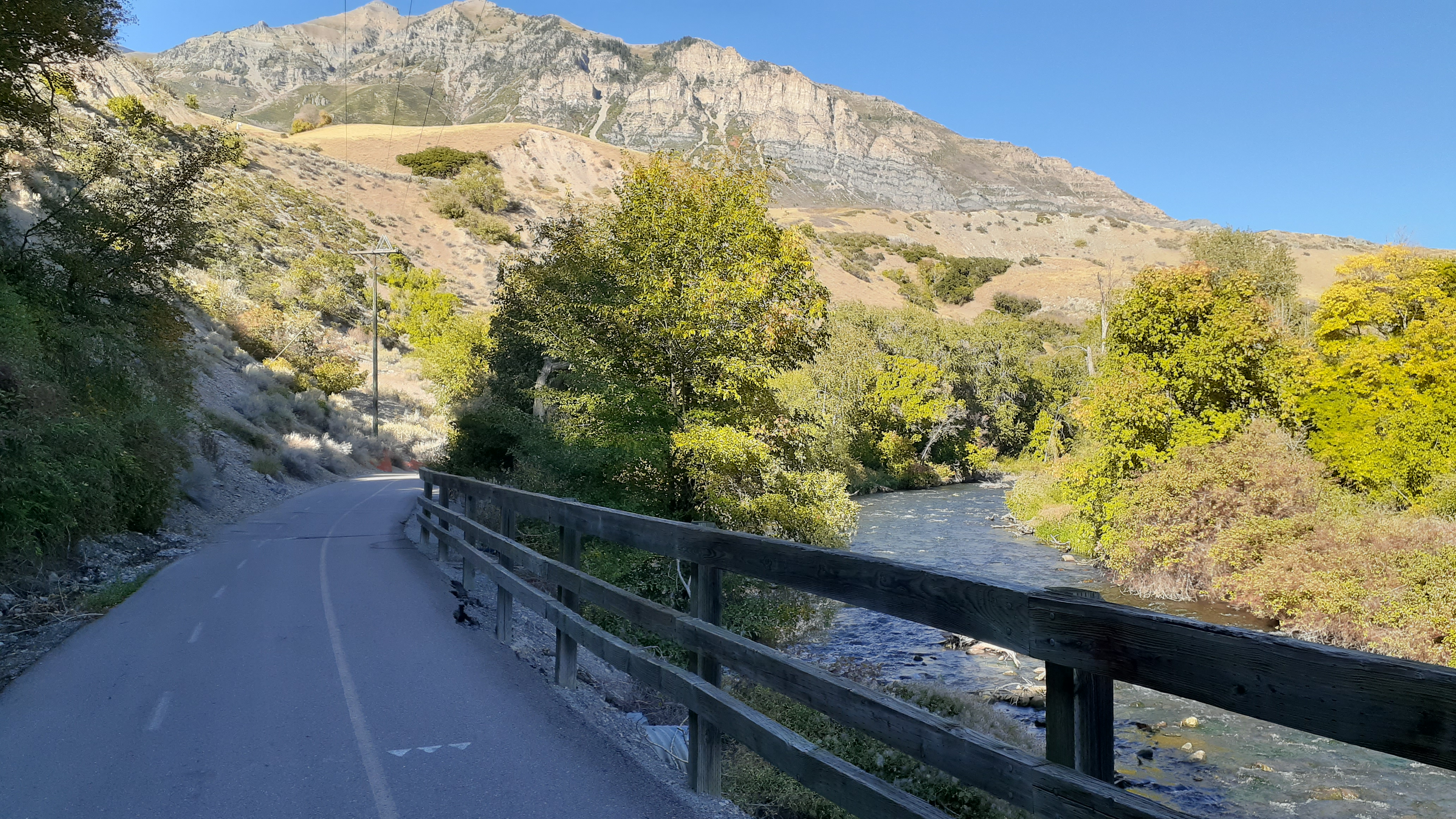
A section of the Provo River Parkway Trail along the Provo River.

The Provo river is an excellent place for outdoor enthusiasts. Fishing is a popular activity along all stretches of the river, with brown and rainbow trout commonly found in the river. Running and biking are common on the Provo River Parkway, a 15-mile trail along the river from Utah Lake to Vivian Park in Provo Canyon; and floating the river in inner tubes is popular during the summer.

== Flora and Fauna ==
Many native species of riparian, wetland, highland, and aquatic vegetation live in and on the river. Several key species such as the Warbling Vireo, bald eagle, spotted frog, stonefly, and brown trout inhabit the river ecosystem.

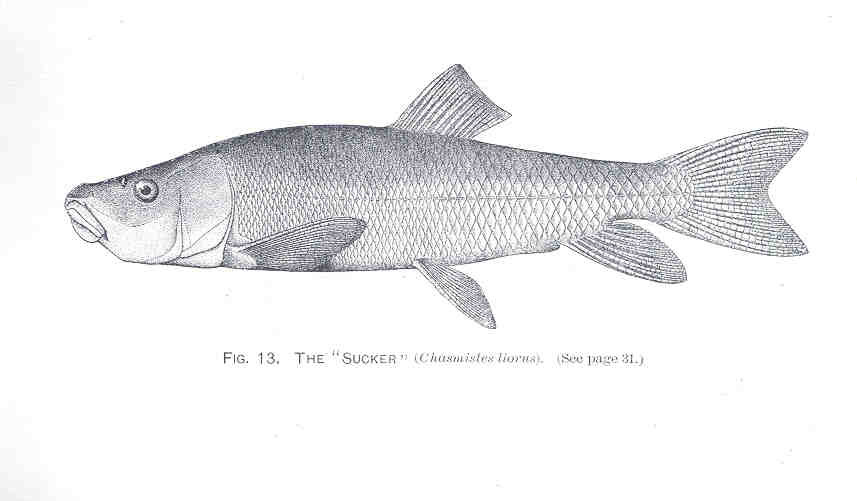
June Sucker Fish

Endangered species: The June Sucker, endemic to the Utah Lake watershed, was abundant when first documented in the 19th century. Due to overfishing, the species population declined. Non-native species, including common carp, white bass, walleye, and black bullhead, were introduced to Utah Lake to provide a food source. Between overfishing, competition, and predation of non-native species, the native June Sucker population has been reduced from over a million to under 1,000. As of 1979, the common carp made up 90% of fish by mass in Utah Lake, and the June Sucker was less than 1%.

== Soils ==
There is a wide variety of soil taxonomic classes present on the banks of the Provo River and beneath its flowing waters. As the river moves underneath Lakeshore Drive, the soil underneath the water transitions from cobbly alluvial land as the main soil to mixed alluvial materials. Where the Provo River passes through Utah Lake State Park to enter Utah Lake, the below-water soils are primarily mixed with alluvial materials. Close to the mouth of the river, the banks are primarily composed of McBeth silt loam. Chipman loam and Chipman silt loam are also present towards the mouth of the river but in significantly smaller quantities. There are also isolated pockets of Peteetneet and the presence of the Provo-Sunset complex along the bank within a 16,000 feet (4,900 m) latitudinal range of the river mouth.

In addition to the variety of soil taxonomic classes, there is a range of hydrologic soil groups. The portion of mixed alluvial land soils underneath the water has a D rating which is typical of soils with very slow infiltration rates and high runoff potential. The cobbly alluvial land has a rating in this area of B, which has a moderate infiltration rate when wet. The available water capacity of the soils within a 16,000 feet (4,900 m) latitudinal range of the river mouth varies from 0.06 to 0.23 centimeters per centimeter.

== Restoration Efforts ==
The Provo River Restoration Project (PRRP) began in 1999 and ended in 2008, and focused on the area of the Provo River between the Jordanelle Dam and Deer Creek Reservoir in order to restore the middle Provo River's pattern and ecological function to a more natural condition. The PRRP consisted of restoring the straightened river channel to a meandering channel mimicking historic conditions, reconnecting the river to existing remnants of historic secondary channels, and constructing small side channels to recreate aquatic features. The project provided a protected 800 to 2,200 feet (240 to 670 m) wide corridor along the entire reach of the restored middle Provo River for angler access and wildlife habitat. Existing levees were set back to create a near natural flood plain and allowed the river to change course naturally. Planting and fostering streamside vegetation provided necessary environment for healthy fisheries.

The Provo River Delta Project began in June 2020 to help with the recovery of the June sucker and the restoration of the area's ecosystem. To accomplish this, the water in the Provo River was diverted through a new series of artificial channels before entering Utah Lake. The Provo River Delta officially opened on October 26, 2024. Other fish species have benefitted from the Provo River Delta Project's inclusion of off-channel habitats such as ponds and old channel cutoffs that provide fish refuge protection from high winter flows and may offer rich invertebrate food sources. Fish species that benefitted include: mottled sculpin, mountain whitefish, longnose dace, speckled dace, mountain sucker, redside shiner, and Utah sucker.

This restoration has enhanced public recreation by creating new trails, restrooms, fishing platforms, kayaking opportunities, interpretive features, and a viewing tower for public use. Helping citizens of Utah Valley appreciate the Provo River will increase their willingness to invest resources in conservation efforts.

== Environmental Concerns ==
The urban expansion in the counties surrounding the Provo River has seriously affected it. A study conducted between 1999 and 2002 examined the changes in the macroinvertebrate communities. The study concluded that there had been a loss in the diversity and abundance of the macroinvertebrate communities. It found that changes increased as time and urbanization increased.

There are also concerns about the effect of the Jordanelle Dam on the hydrology of the river. The initial purpose of the dam was to regulate flow into Deer Creek Reservoir as well as provide water storage during drought. However, with the implementation of the dam, studies show there is a decrease in flow downstream, which affects sediment size by decreasing mobilization of larger gravel-sized particles, which can eventually lead to a depletion of fine sediments in the bed over time. This can negatively affect the habitat and spawning ground environments for certain fish species.

== See also ==
- List of rivers of Utah
