= Deer Creek Dam and Reservoir =

Reservoir in the state of Utah, United States

Deer Creek Reservoir
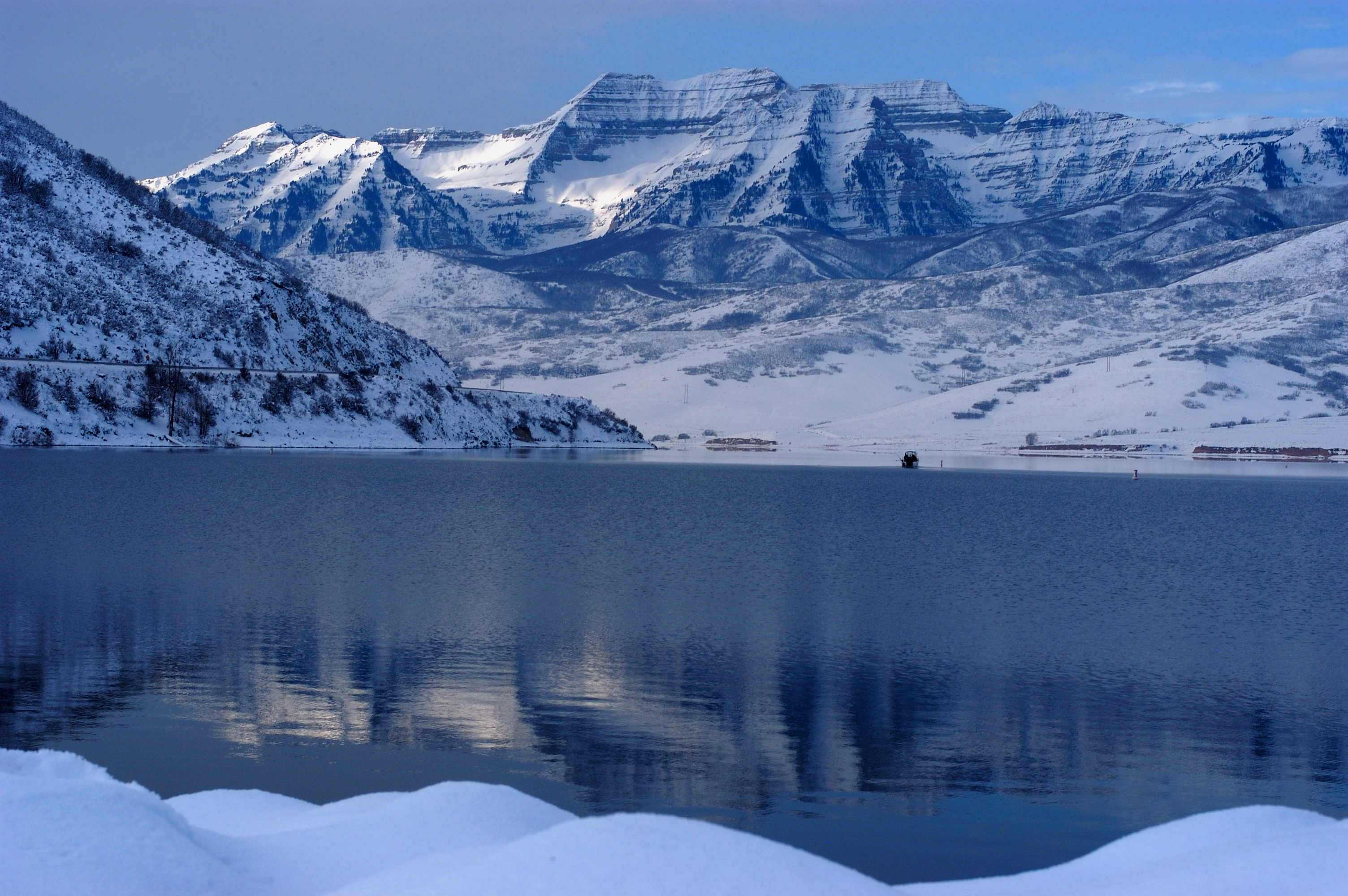

- Location within Utah Location within the United States
- Location: Wasatch County, Utah
- Coordinates: 40°24′24″N 111°31′37″W
- Type: reservoir
- Primary inflows: Provo River
- Primary outflows: Provo River
- Catchment area: 1,870 km^{2} (720 sq mi)
- Basin countries: United States
- Max. length: 9.1 km (5.7 mi)
- Max. width: 1.8 km (1.1 mi)
- Surface area: 12 km^{2} (4.6 sq mi)
- Water volume: 1 km (0.62 mi)
- Residence time: 1.3 year
- Shore length^{1}: 1 km (0.62 mi)
- Surface elevation: 1,651 m (5,417 ft)
- Islands: 1
- Settlements: 1
- ^{1} Shore length is not a well-defined measure.

The Deer Creek Dam and Reservoir hydroelectric facilities are on the Provo River in western Wasatch County, Utah, United States, about 16 miles (26 km) northeast of Provo. The dam is a zoned earthfill structure 235 feet (72 m) high with a crest length of 1,304 ft (397 m). The dam contains 2,810,000 cubic yards (2,150,000 m³) of material and forms a reservoir of 152,570 acre-foot (188,190,000 m^{3}) capacity. Construction began in May 1938 and was completed in 1941. The reservoir supplies water for agricultural, municipal, and industrial use. Recreational activities on and around the reservoir include boating, fishing, camping, swimming and water skiing.

The Deer Creek Dam is the key structure of the Provo River Project managed by the U.S. Department of the Interior Bureau of Reclamation.

Deer Creek Reservoir is the main feature of Deer Creek State Park.

Deer Creek is home to several fish species, including Largemouth and Smallmouth Bass, Rainbow Trout, Brown Trout, Yellow Perch, Walleye and Common Carp. Some anglers have also reported catching kokanee salmon at the reservoir as well, likely from the healthy population at Jordanelle Reservoir that made their way down stream. State biologists don't see Deer Creek as sustaining, or having the capacity to sustain a healthy kokanee salmon population.

== Climate ==
Climate data for Deer Creek Dam, Utah, 1991–2020 normals, 1939-2020 extremes: 5270ft (1606m)
| Month | Jan | Feb | Mar | Apr | May | Jun | Jul | Aug | Sep | Oct | Nov | Dec | Year |
|---|---|---|---|---|---|---|---|---|---|---|---|---|---|
| Record high °F (°C) | 58 (14) | 67 (19) | 74 (23) | 81 (27) | 90 (32) | 100 (38) | 100 (38) | 99 (37) | 96 (36) | 90 (32) | 72 (22) | 65 (18) | 100 (38) |
| Mean maximum °F (°C) | 49.4 (9.7) | 53.9 (12.2) | 65.6 (18.7) | 74.1 (23.4) | 81.1 (27.3) | 88.8 (31.6) | 94.0 (34.4) | 91.4 (33.0) | 86.7 (30.4) | 77.7 (25.4) | 64.9 (18.3) | 52.5 (11.4) | 94.5 (34.7) |
| Mean daily maximum °F (°C) | 34.7 (1.5) | 39.3 (4.1) | 49.5 (9.7) | 57.2 (14.0) | 66.5 (19.2) | 77.2 (25.1) | 85.9 (29.9) | 84.4 (29.1) | 75.4 (24.1) | 62.6 (17.0) | 48.2 (9.0) | 36.3 (2.4) | 59.8 (15.4) |
| Daily mean °F (°C) | 23.7 (−4.6) | 27.4 (−2.6) | 36.5 (2.5) | 43.4 (6.3) | 51.5 (10.8) | 59.9 (15.5) | 67.5 (19.7) | 66.5 (19.2) | 57.9 (14.4) | 46.7 (8.2) | 35.6 (2.0) | 25.7 (−3.5) | 45.2 (7.3) |
| Mean daily minimum °F (°C) | 12.6 (−10.8) | 15.4 (−9.2) | 23.5 (−4.7) | 29.7 (−1.3) | 36.5 (2.5) | 42.6 (5.9) | 49.2 (9.6) | 48.6 (9.2) | 40.4 (4.7) | 30.9 (−0.6) | 22.9 (−5.1) | 15.1 (−9.4) | 30.6 (−0.8) |
| Mean minimum °F (°C) | −4.7 (−20.4) | −2.6 (−19.2) | 8.1 (−13.3) | 18.6 (−7.4) | 25.2 (−3.8) | 33.1 (0.6) | 39.8 (4.3) | 39.6 (4.2) | 29.3 (−1.5) | 19.5 (−6.9) | 7.9 (−13.4) | −0.7 (−18.2) | −9.6 (−23.1) |
| Record low °F (°C) | −33 (−36) | −39 (−39) | −23 (−31) | 4 (−16) | 11 (−12) | 22 (−6) | 29 (−2) | 28 (−2) | 19 (−7) | 2 (−17) | −11 (−24) | −30 (−34) | −39 (−39) |
| Average precipitation inches (mm) | 3.08 (78) | 2.29 (58) | 1.83 (46) | 1.60 (41) | 2.06 (52) | 1.06 (27) | 0.66 (17) | 1.08 (27) | 1.40 (36) | 2.03 (52) | 1.79 (45) | 2.79 (71) | 21.67 (550) |
| Average snowfall inches (cm) | 26.20 (66.5) | 12.20 (31.0) | 4.00 (10.2) | 1.90 (4.8) | 0.00 (0.00) | 0.00 (0.00) | 0.00 (0.00) | 0.00 (0.00) | 0.00 (0.00) | 0.30 (0.76) | 6.50 (16.5) | 22.80 (57.9) | 73.9 (187.66) |
Source 1: NOAA
Source 2: XMACIS2 (records & monthly max/mins)

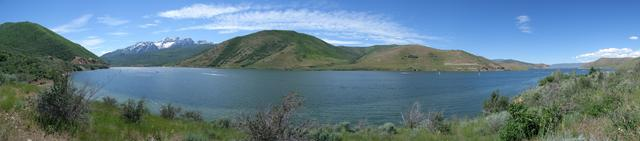
Deer Creek Reservoir panorama

== See also ==
- List of dams and reservoirs in Utah
