= Big Cottonwood Canyon =

Canyon in Salt Lake County, Utah, United States

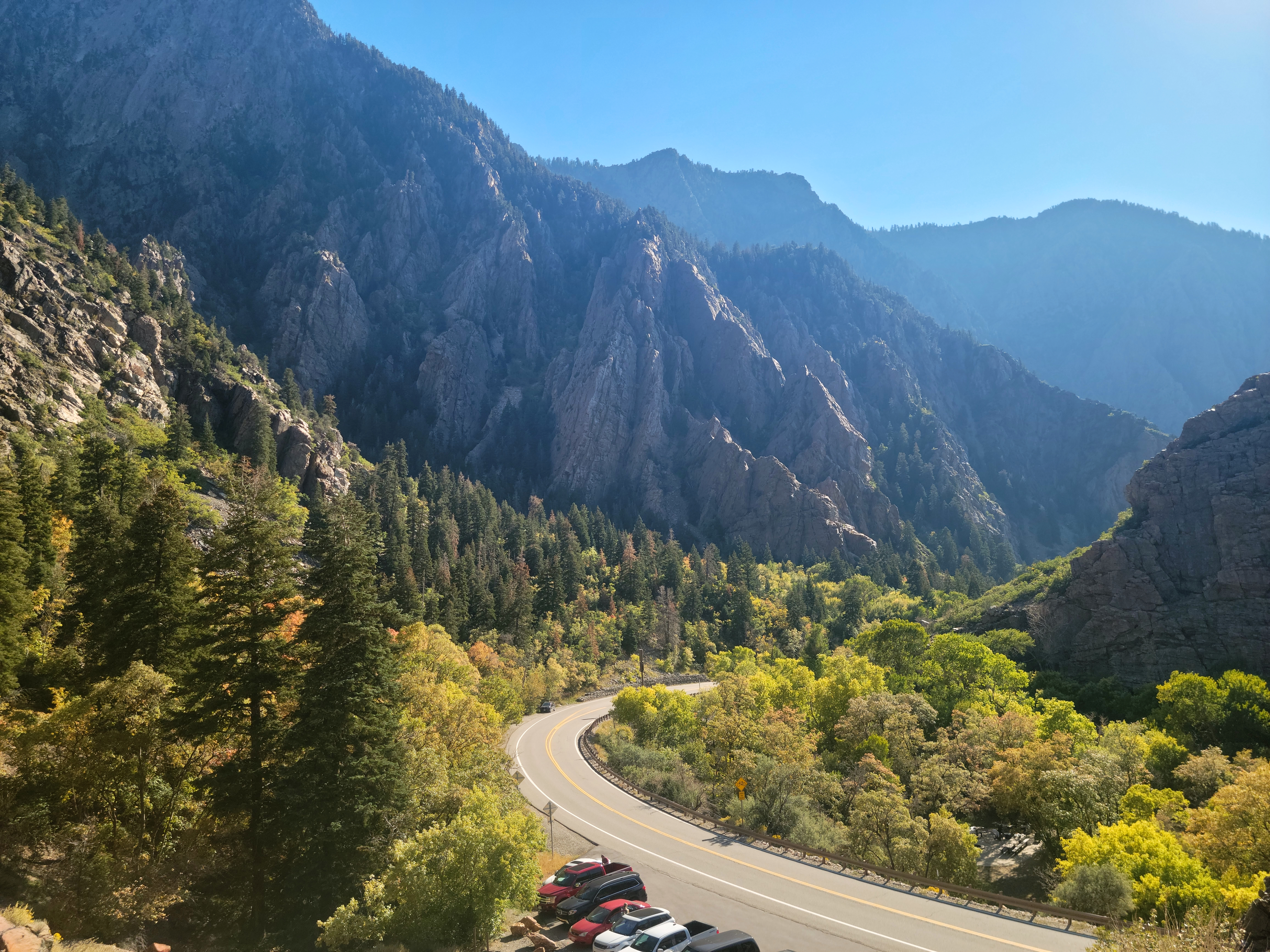

- Location within Utah Location within the United States
- Length: 15 miles (24 km) East-West

Geography
- Location: Salt Lake County
- Coordinates: 40°37′11″N 111°46′32″W
- Traversed by: Utah State Route 190
- Interactive map of Big Cottonwood Canyon

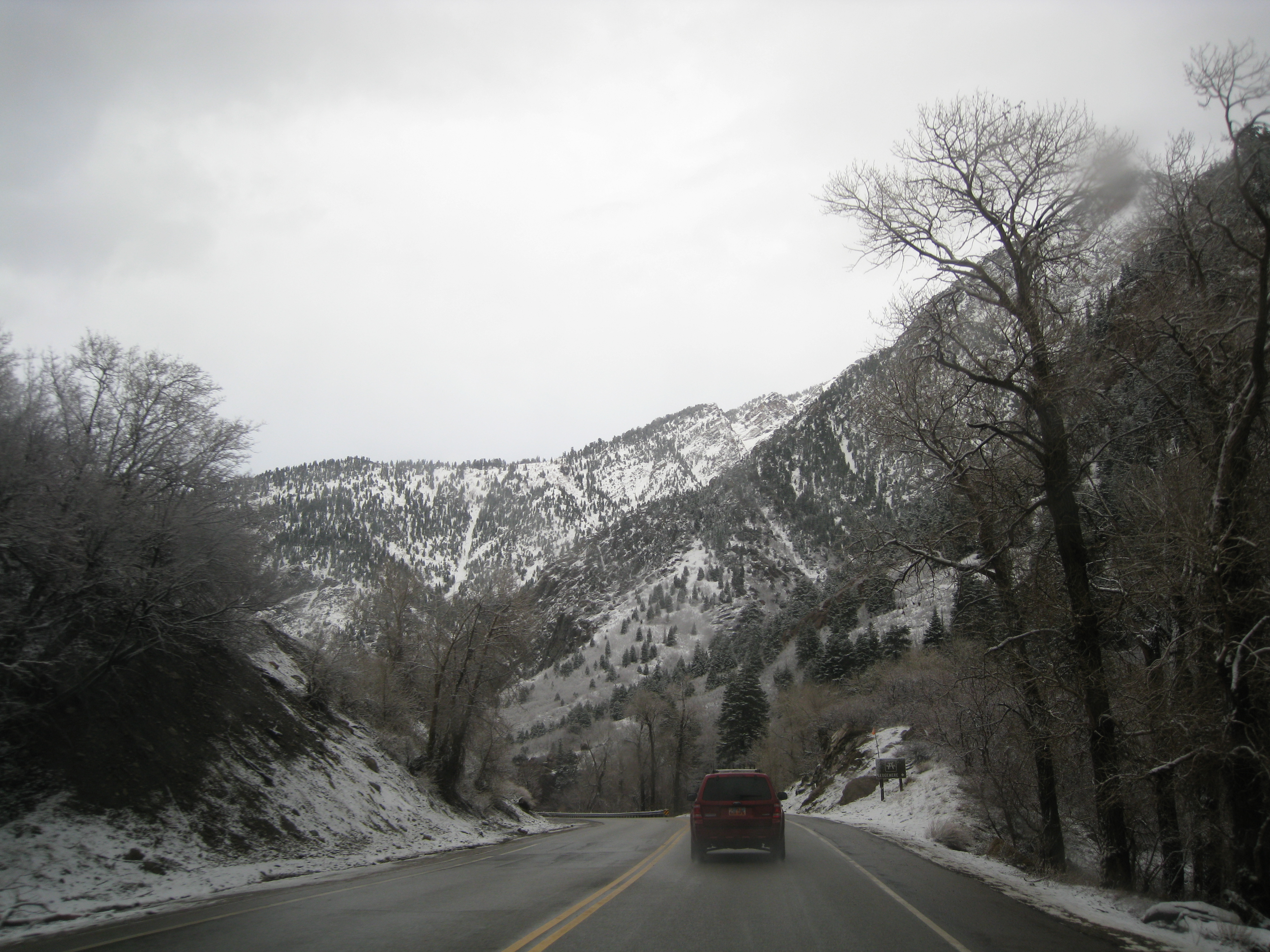
A snowy winter view of the canyon

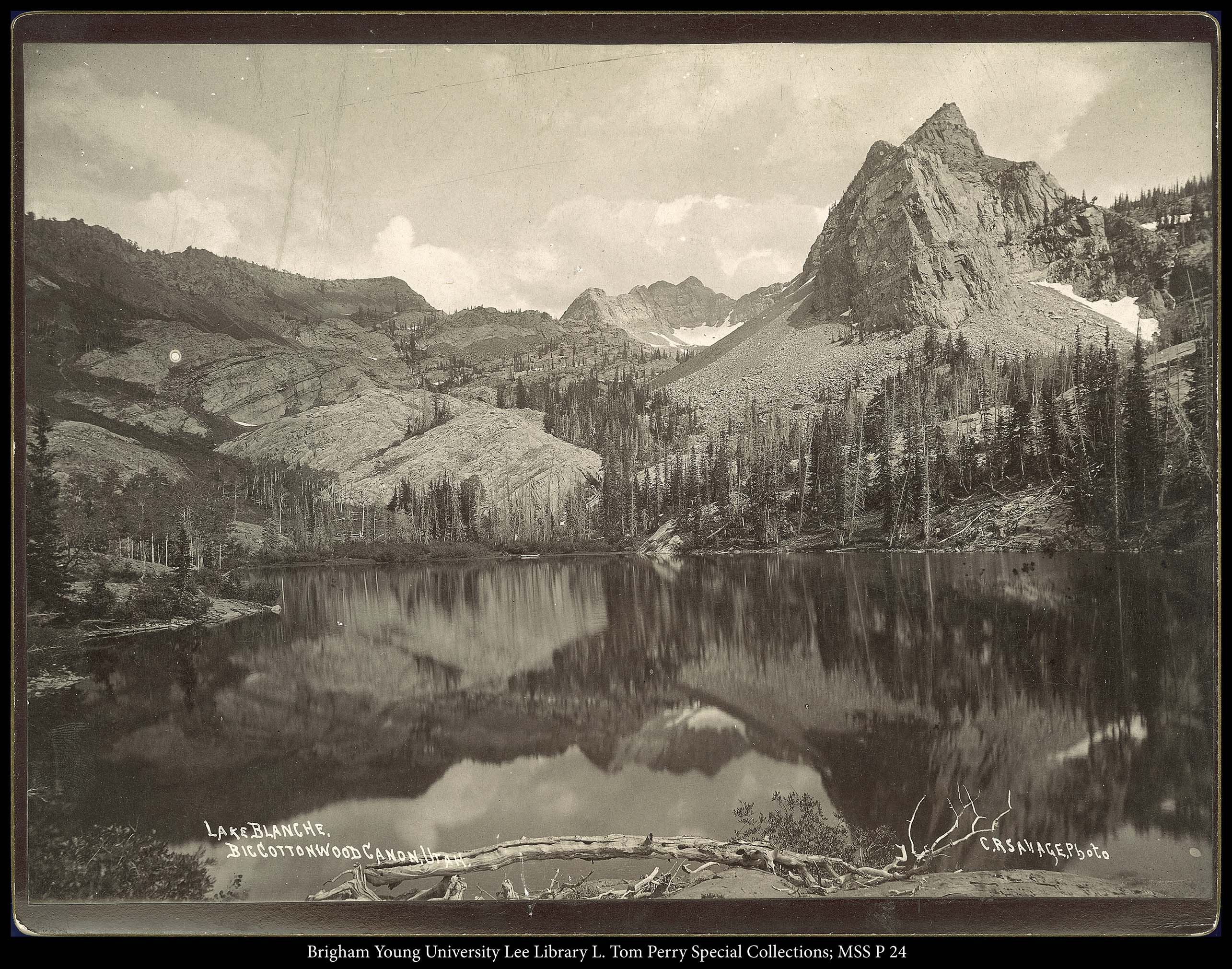
Lake Blanche in Big Cottonwood Canyon, c. 1869

Big Cottonwood Canyon is a canyon in the Wasatch Range 12 miles (19 km) southeast of Salt Lake City in the U.S. state of Utah. The 15-mile (24 km)-long canyon provides hiking, biking, picnicking, rock-climbing, camping, and fishing in the summer. Its two ski resorts, Brighton and Solitude, are popular among skiers and snowboarders. The canyon is accessed by The Big Cottonwood Canyon Scenic Byway (SR-190), which runs its length to Guardsman Pass at the top of the canyon, allowing travel to Park City in the summer months.

Hiking to the canyon's mountain lakes is popular, with many trails leading to lakes such as Mary, Martha, and Katherine. The canyon's most popular hiking trail leads to Lakes Blanche, Florence and Lillian. The trail is 3.1 miles (5.0 km) long and a strenuous hike. Since the canyon was formed by Big Cottonwood Creek, the V-shaped canyon has many impressive rock forms.

The canyon is also a frequent destination for Utah Native Plant Society wildflower walks and for University of Utah botanical field trips. The canyon and the adjoining Little Cottonwood Canyon contain significant biodiversity and are home to a number of rare and endemic plant species. One example is the Wasatch shooting star, Dodecatheon dentatum var. utahense which is only known from Big Cottonwood Canyon.

Big Cottonwood Canyon is a watershed canyon that supplies drinking water to the Wasatch Front, therefore, pets and other domesticated animals are not allowed. In November 2011, a proposal to construct a gondola linking Solitude Ski Resort through Big Cottonwood Canyon to the Canyons Resort in Summit County drew criticism over concerns about its potential effect on sensitive terrain and watershed impacts.

== Storm Mountain ==
Storm Mountain is a popular picnic site. Over one hundred years ago, R.D. Maxfield Jr. carved out a home for himself and his family here. It soon became a relaxing place for picnics. In the 1930s, the Civilian Conservation Corps built a small stage area for public events.

The Storm Mountain area is also notable geologically for its rhythmites (a sea-level sedimentary deposit that records the cycle of the tides or periodic floods) and cross-bedded sandstones.

== S-Curve Area ==
S-Curve Area is a popular rock climbing area in Big Cottonwood Canyon. Most of the routes are bolted and offer a variety of grades. Most distinctive about this climbing area is the impressive overhangs that exist on many of the routes. The S-Curve Area is located just 4.25 miles (6.84 km) from the mouth of the canyon.

== Gallery ==
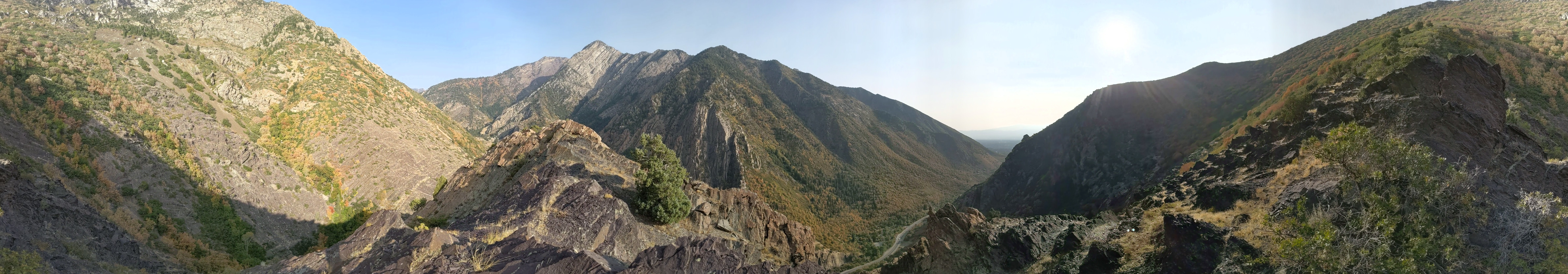
Panorama from the summit above Granite Flume

== See also ==
- Big Cottonwood Creek
- Stairs Station Hydroelectric Power Plant Historic District and Granite Hydroelectric Power Plant Historic District, both in the canyon
