= Wendover Cut-off =

Highway in Utah

Route information
- Maintained by Tooele County Road Department
- Length: 40.3 mi (64.9 km)
- Existed: June 13, 1925–present

Major junctions
- West end: I-80 BL / SR-58 in Wendover
- East end: I-80 in Knolls

Location
- Country: United States
- State: Utah
- Counties: Tooele

Highway system
- Utah State Highway System; Interstate; US; State; Minor; Scenic

The Wendover Cut-off, also called the Wendover Road or Wendover Route, is a two-lane highway in the western part of Tooele County in the U.S. state of Utah. Stretching 40.3 miles (64.9 km) from Wendover to Knolls across the Bonneville Salt Flats, a part of the Great Salt Lake Desert, the cut-off was once part of the primary link between the Nevada state line and Salt Lake City. In 2012, between 240 and 250 vehicles used the cut-off near its western terminus in Wendover on an average day.

The first roadway across the Great Salt Lake Desert was completed in 1917 as a single-lane highway. It was added to the Utah state highway system in 1919, and replacement plans had begun to arise as soon as 1921. In 1923, the current cut-off was approved for construction and was opened to the traveling public in 1925. The United States Numbered Highway System brought the arrival of the U.S. Route 40 (US-40) designation to the highway, on the same day the Lincoln Highway Association agreed to abandon their southerly route to Ely, and route the Lincoln Highway along the cut-off. Later, the cut-off was also designated as part of US-50 and US-50 Alternate (US-50 Alt). Upon the completion of the parallel Interstate 80 (I-80), the previous U.S. Route designations were deleted from the United States Numbered Highway System, and the cut-off was turned over to the county.

== Route description ==
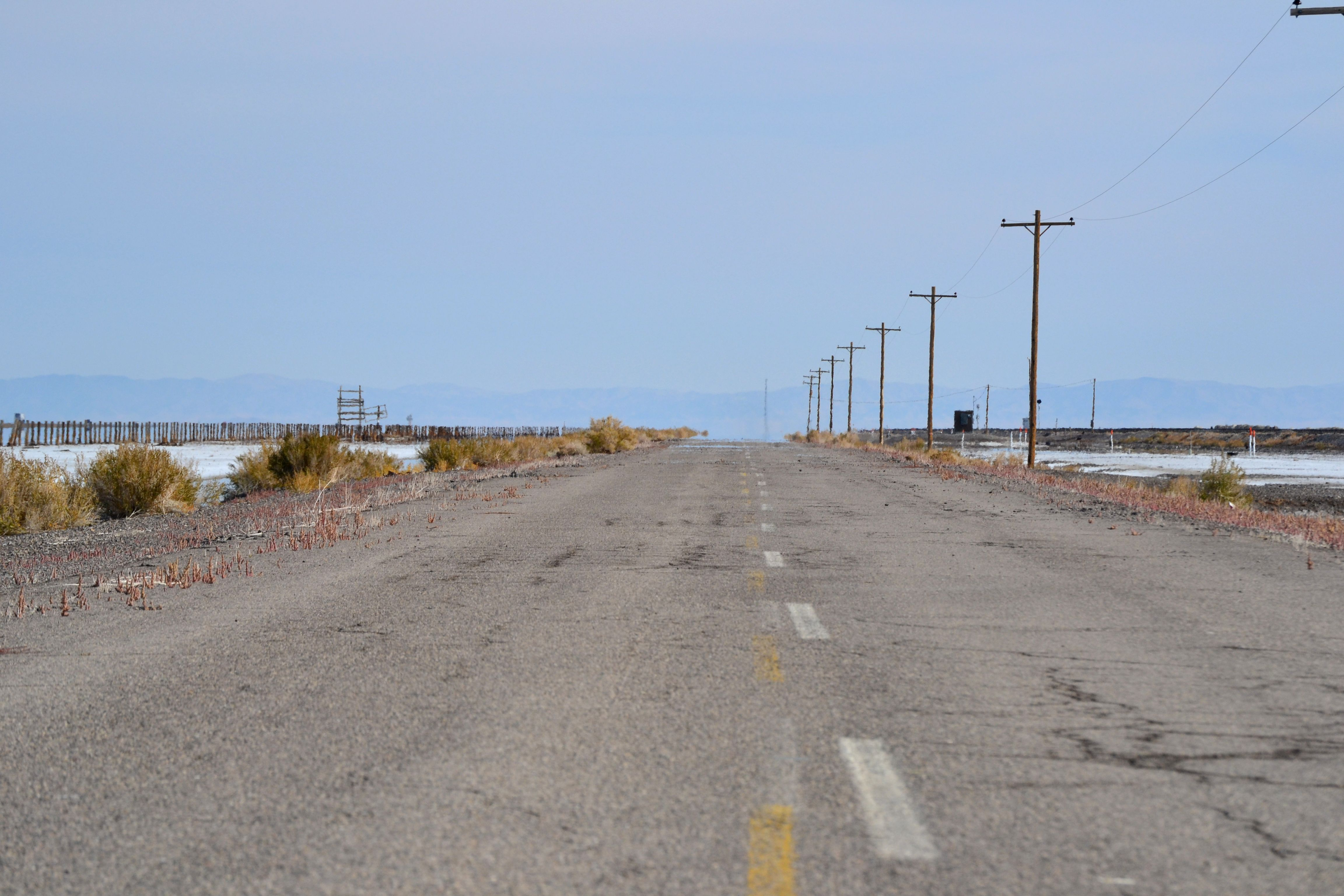
Near the eastern terminus in 2011

The Wendover Cut-off begins at a T-intersection with concurrent Utah State Route 58 (SR-58) and I-80 Business in the eastern portion of Wendover, south of Danger Cave. The cut-off travels due east by I-80 to the north and the now Union Pacific Central Corridor railroad tracks to the south. Leppy Pass Road, exit 4 on I-80, provides access to the Bonneville Speedway north of the Interstate. Between SR-58 and Leppy Pass Road, the highway is designated Federal Aid Route 2654. Further south, a rest area was built along the southern side of I-80, however no road access was provided between the rest area and the cut-off. Metaphor: The Tree of Utah was built on the northern side of I-80 in the middle of the salt flats further east from the rest area. Before terminating at I-80 the highway veers north and forms a diamond interchange in the unincorporated community of Knolls. A frontage road continues on the northern side of I-80 after this interchange. The land that the cut-off was built upon was once compared to as being "as flat as a billiard table." Unlike more traditional steel or iron culverts, the cut-off uses all timber culverts, as the salt erodes the metal ones too quickly.

Although maintained as part of the Tooele County road network, the portion of the cut-off designated Federal Aid Route 2654 is surveyed by the Utah Department of Transportation (UDOT) to measure traffic volumes. This is expressed in terms of average annual daily traffic (AADT), a measure of traffic volume for any average day of the year. In 2012, UDOT calculated between 240 and 250 vehicles used the cut-off near its western terminus. By comparison, traffic on the parallel I-80 between the Nevada state line and Leppy Pass Road (the Bonneville Speedway exit, and the end of Federal Aid Route 2654 on the cut-off) ranges between 6,765 and 7,345 vehicles per day.

== History ==
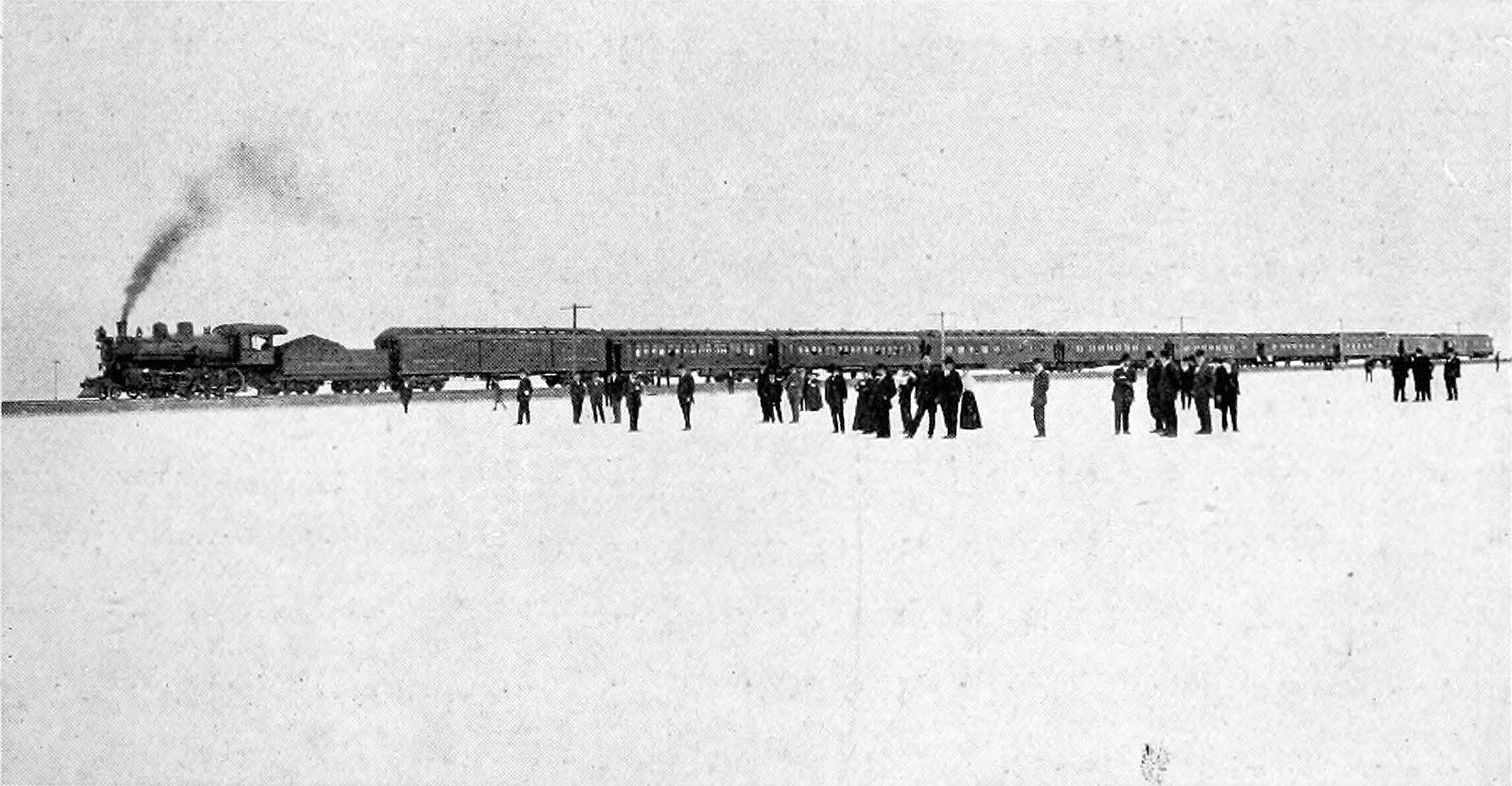
Western Pacific Railroad in Salduro (1911)

The Western Pacific Railroad line, part of the Feather River Route, that parallels the cut-off was built between 1906 and 1907, filling a causeway with rock and gravel at a great cost. Along the route across the Great Salt Lake Desert, the railroad served the communities of Arinosa, Barro, and Salduro, which were also served by the new road. The Union Pacific Railroad merged with the Missouri Pacific Railroad and the Western Pacific in December 1982.

=== First roads ===
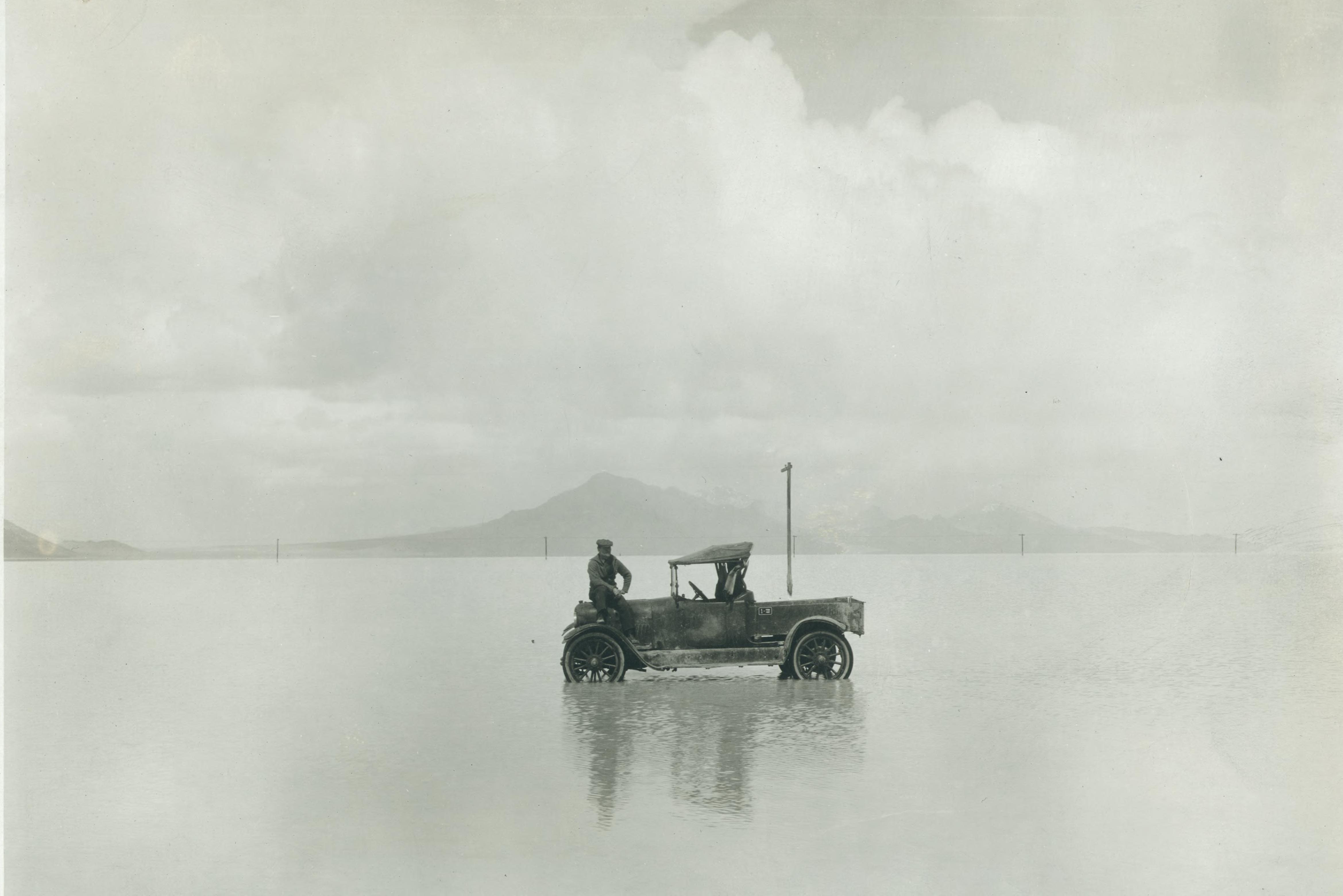
Along the cut-off during the 1922 wet season

The Lincoln Highway was the first transcontinental auto route completed across the Great Salt Lake Desert. However, after some controversy, the route across western Utah was later succeeded by the Victory Highway. The original alignment of the Lincoln Highway was about 40 miles (64 km) south of the Victory Highway and present-day I-80, and is now partially inaccessible because it lies inside the Dugway Proving Ground. The original route west of Dugway was part of the Pony Express Trail, used between 1860 and 1861 by the Pony Express. Early Lincoln Highway guides advised that travelers whose vehicles became disabled near Fish Springs could set fire to tumbleweed, as it could be seen by rescuers up to 20 miles (32 km) away. The original alignment was then routed through various ranches and mining towns such as Callao, Gold Hill, and Ibapah to Ely, and not through Wendover. The "Goodyear Cutoff" was partially constructed in 1919 as a more direct route between Gold Hill and Dugway.

In December 1919, the Utah State Legislature approved the newly constructed single-lane Victory Highway as part of the state's highway system. The Victory Highway was a 3,271-mile-long (5,264 km) interstate highway linking New York City to San Francisco, named in honor of those who served during World War I. The road was constructed after $30 thousand (equivalent to $700,000 in 2023) was approved by the legislature, and another $10 thousand (equivalent to $200,000 in 2023) was approved by the Salt Lake City Council in September 1914. Heavy equipment from the nearby Utah-Salduro Company, a potash company, were used during the construction of the single-lane roadway. Tooele County had originally proposed a new gravel road along the salt flats to replace the single-lane highway in 1921; however this was met with resistance from county residents, citing the lack of need.

=== Current road ===
Secretary of Agriculture Henry C. Wallace approved construction of the current two-lane Wendover Cut-Off in 1923, and the Western Pacific Railroad provided a discounted freight rate to bring in the construction materials to construct the cut-off. Sodium chloride was used as a binder in the road which was under construction by October 1924, and the $380,000 (equivalent to $5.3 million in 2023) road was opened by Secretary of Agriculture William M. Jardine and Bureau of Public Roads commissioner Thomas MacDonald on June 13, 1925. The cost of the road was part of an estimated $1.07 billion (equivalent to $14.8 billion in 2023) 57,063-mile-long (91,834 km) road network across the contiguous United States. The opening ceremony of the highway was held in Salduro. The Engineering News-Record called the road "a remarkable piece of construction."

The Lincoln Highway Association lobbied the U.S. Government to get the Lincoln Highway route to Ely added to the United States Numbered Highway System after the passage of the Federal Aid Highway Act of 1921, however the Wendover Cut-off along the Victory Highway was selected instead. The Victory Highway Association called the cut-off the "shortest and most feasible route across the Great Salt Lake Desert". The US-40 designation was applied to the Wendover Cut-off on October 20, 1926, the same day the Lincoln Highway Association conceded and approved the routing of the Lincoln Highway along the cut-off, abandoning their southerly route to Ely. The US-50 designation had been applied to the cut-off by 1939, and by 1957 the US-50 designation had given way to US-50 Alt.

In 1959, radiation clouds crossed the cut-off, spreading radiation between Knolls and Wendover from nuclear tests being conducted at the nearby Dugway Proving Ground. Estimates by the Deseret News put the exposure at 215.5 curies (7.97 TBq); by comparison the Three Mile Island accident only released 15 curies (0.56 TBq) of radiation.

During the construction of I-80, the cut-off was identified as a frontage road for the new controlled-access highway. 160 thousand dollars (equivalent to $1.2 million in 2023) was spent to repave the cut-off during construction of I-80. The US-40 designation was deleted by the American Association of State Highway and Transportation Officials (AASHTO), in concurrence with UDOT, on August 18, 1974, and the US-50 Alt designation was deleted by AASHTO, also in concurrence with UDOT, on August 27, 1976, in effect turning the cut-off over to Tooele County as a county road.

== Major intersections ==
The entire route is in Tooele County.

Location	mi	km	Destinations	Notes
Wendover	0.0	0.0	I-80 BL / SR-58 (Wendover Boulevard) – Wendover, West Wendover, NV	Western terminus; to US 93 Alt. and I-80
	2.6	4.2	Leppy Pass Road	Access to I-80 and Bonneville Speedway
Knolls	40.3	64.9	I-80 – Wendover, Tooele, Salt Lake City	Eastern terminus; roadway continues as Frontage Road
1.000 mi = 1.609 km; 1.000 km = 0.621 mi
