= Arinosa, Utah =

- ghost town
- Location within Utah Location within the United States
- Coordinates: 40°43′52″N 113°40′18″W
- Country: United States
- State: Utah
- County: Tooele
- Elevation: 4,220 ft (1,290 m)
- Time zone: UTC-7 (Mountain (MST))
  - Summer (DST): UTC-6 (MDT)
- Area code: 435

Arinosa is a ghost town located in Tooele County, Utah, United States. Arinosa is 19 miles east of Wendover and 100 miles west of Salt Lake City, in the middle of the Great Salt Lake Desert. Although it lies along the route of the current Interstate 80, there is no exit providing access to the area.

Arinosa began in the early 1880s as a rail maintenance community, and was on the route of the Western Pacific in the early twentieth century, between the stops of Salduro and Barro. The town also lay along the historic route of U.S. 40, which paralleled the Western Pacific line through western Utah. In the 1920s, a chlorine production company built processing facilities there. In the 1950s the settlement was abandoned due to dearth of available water and shifting transportation patterns.

No buildings survive the settlement, although Metaphor: The Tree of Utah is only a few miles east of the former site of Arinosa.
