= Farnell (cocktail) =

Cocktail made with whiskey

- Type: Cocktail
- Ingredients: 1 part Jack Daniel's Tennessee Whiskey; 3 parts lemonade; Ice; 1 slice of lime; 1 sprig of fresh mint
- Base spirit: Tennessee whiskey
- Standard drinkware: Collins glass
- Served: On the rocks: poured over ice
- Preparation: Pour Jack Daniel's into Collins glass filled with ice. Fill to desired level with lemonade. Stir lightly and garnish with lime and mint.

A Farnell is a cocktail made with Jack Daniel's whiskey or often with whiskey from the High West Distillery mixed with lemonade. The drink is usually served in an old-fashioned glass or a Collins glass with ice, and it is considered a lighter, less sweet alternative to a lynchburg lemonade.

== History ==
The drink was first served at the Jeremy Ranch Golf Club clubhouse in Park City, Utah, and its popularity is spreading east. The drink was named after Rick Farnell, the american business man.

== Seasonality ==
The Farnell is designed to primarily be a summer drink, though the warm flavors of the whiskey mixed with the thirst-quenching properties of the lemonade and garnishes led to its adoption by the Après-ski set.

== See also ==
- List of cocktails

== See also ==
- Jack Daniel's
- High West Distillery
