= Momen =

Momen may refer to:

- Nurul Momen (1908–1990), (Sobriquet:- Natyaguru) professor, educationist, pioneer playwright & director, Author, Translator, Broadcaster, Satirist, personal essay pioneer in Bangladesh
- Mohamed Abd Al Momen Ankba, Sudanese footballer
- Karl Momen, Swedish architect, painter and sculptor
- Mohammad Momen (born 1940), Faqih and member of the Guardian Council of the Islamic Republic of Iran
- Moojan Momen, scholar of Baháʼí and Shi'i studies
- Tarek Momen (born 1988), professional squash player who represented Egypt

== See also ==
- Ittan-momen, a Tsukumogami formed from a roll of cotton in Japanese myth
- Mo'men
- Momoen
