= Metaphor: The Tree of Utah =

Sculpture by Karl Momen in Utah, US

Coordinates: 40.73322°N 113.55086°W

- Artist: Karl Momen
- Year: 1986
- Type: Sculpture
- Medium: concrete
- Dimensions: 27 m (87 ft)
- Location: Bonneville Salt Flats between Arinosa and Barro
- Owner: State of Utah

Metaphor: The Tree of Utah, sometimes called the Tree of Life, is an 87-foot-tall (27 m) sculpture that was created by the Swedish artist Karl Momen in the 1980s and dedicated in 1986. It is located in the desolate Great Salt Lake Desert of Utah on the west bound side of Interstate 80, about 25 miles (40 km) east of Wendover and midway between the former railroad communities of Arinosa and Barro. The sculpture, which is constructed mainly of concrete, consists of a squarish "trunk" holding up six spheres that are coated with natural rock and minerals native to Utah. There are also several hollow sphere segments on the ground around the base. The sculpture currently has a fence surrounding the base to protect people from falling tiles.

Inscribed on the plaque are the words from Ode to Joy by Friedrich Schiller, also used as the chorus of Beethoven's Ninth Symphony. It has been said that Momen was moved to create the 87-foot-tall (27 m) tree after having a vision of a tree while driving across the desolate Bonneville Salt Flats.

Following the dedication of this work of art, Momen donated the sculpture to the State of Utah and returned to Sweden. However, in 2011 he proposed creating a visitors center at the location with construction costs being paid for by donations.

== See also ==
- Sun Tunnels
- Spiral Jetty
- Utah monolith
