= Karl Momen =

Iranian-Swedish architect, painter and sculptor (1934–2024)

- Born: April 3, 1934; Mashad, Iran
- Died: April 9, 2024 (aged 90)
- Education: Kunst Academy, Stuttgart
- Occupations: Architect, painter, sculptor
- Known for: Metaphor: The Tree of Utah

Karl Momen (3 April 1934 – 9 April 2024) was a Swedish architect, painter and sculptor.

== Life and career ==
Momen was born in the city of Mashad, Iran on 3 April 1934. He was the creator of the Metaphor: The Tree of Utah, an 87-foot (27 m) sculpture resembling a tree in the Bonneville Salt Flats off of Interstate 80. Apparently, while driving along the highway to California, Momen had a vision of a tree in the desert. The Tree of Utah symbolically represents the tree of life discussed in the Book of Mormon. It was created as a metaphor for the desert blossoming as a rose. He financed the project himself and built it from 1982 to 1986, afterwards donating the sculpture to the state of Utah.

The Iranian-born Momen, who painted portraits of Stalin and the Shah of Iran early in his career, later studied with the surrealist painter Max Ernst, and studied architecture at the Kunst Academy in Stuttgart, Germany. It has been said that he was moved to create the 87-foot-tall (27 m) tree by the "vastness and relative emptiness" of the Bonneville Salt Flats, and that the tree "brings space, nature, myth and technology together". The tree's six spheres are all coated with natural rock and minerals found within the state of Utah, and the pods below symbolize the changing of the seasons, when trees naturally transform themselves. The tree is the property of the State of Utah.

Momen died on 9 April 2024, at the age of 90.
