= Barro, Utah =

Barro
- Ghost town
- Location within Utah Location within the United States
- Coordinates: 40°43′37″N 113°29′20″W
- Country: United States
- State: Utah
- County: Tooele
- Elevation: 4,222 ft (1,287 m)

Population (2021)
  - Total: 0
- Time zone: UTC-7 (Mountain (MST))
  - Summer (DST): UTC-6 (MDT)
- GNIS feature ID: 1437497

Barro is a ghost town and railroad siding in Tooele County, Utah, United States. It is located along the Central Corridor Union Pacific Railroad rail line and the Wendover Cut-off (Old U.S. Route 40) and south of Interstate 80 in the Great Salt Lake Desert.

The Metaphor: The Tree of Utah artwork is located nearby and is about 3.5 mi (5.6 km) west of Barro.

== See also ==
- List of ghost towns in Utah
