= Jeremy Ranch, Utah =

Jeremy Ranch Formerly known as Gorgoza
- Community
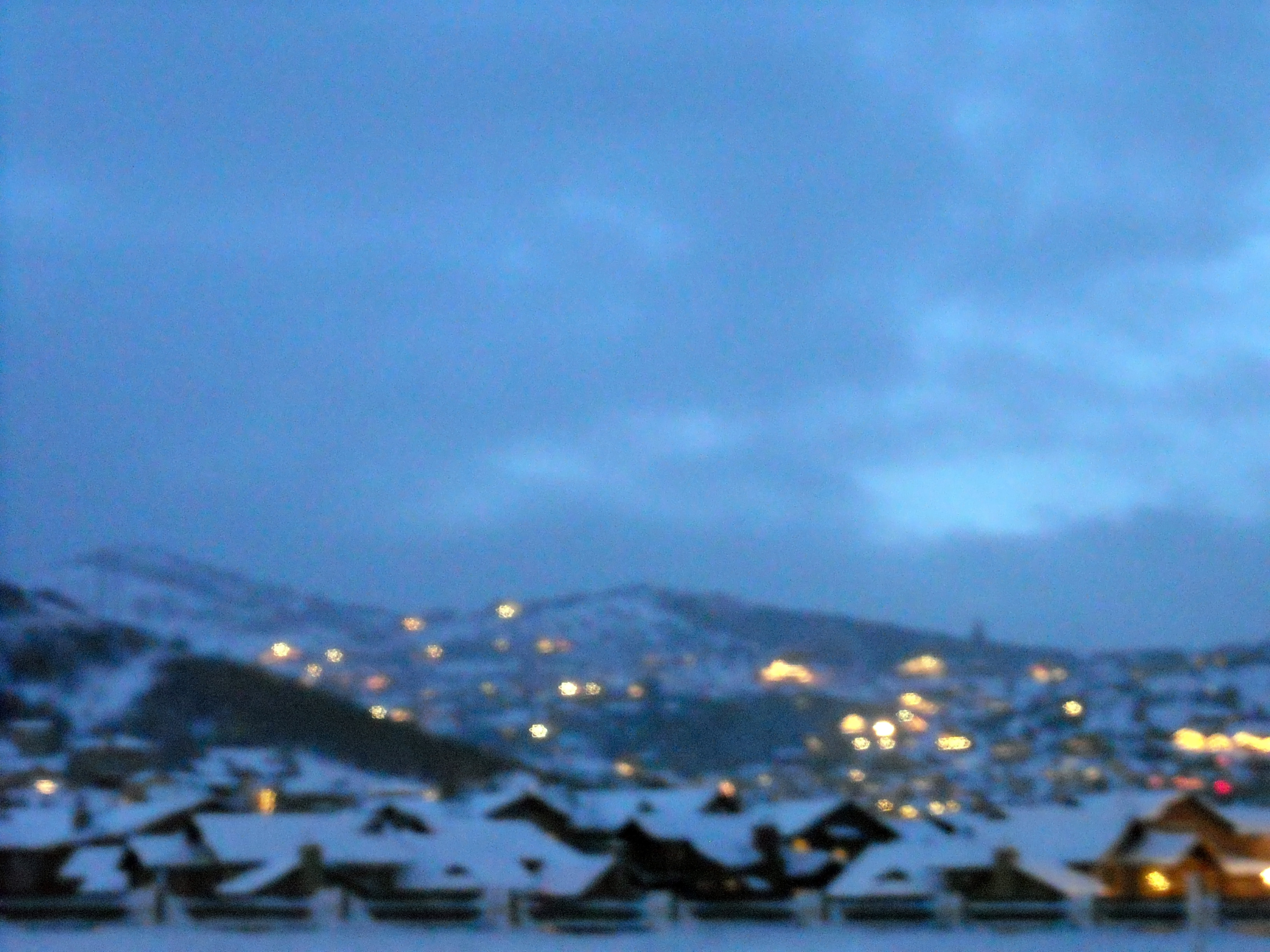
- Jeremy Ranch on a winter evening in December 2006

- Location of Jeremy Ranch within the State of Utah Jeremy Ranch (the United States)
- Coordinates: 40.75417°N 111.55861°W
- Country: United States
- State: Utah
- County: Summit
- Census-designated place: Summit Park
- Elevation: 6,434 ft (1,961 m)
- ZIP code: 84098
- GNIS feature ID: 1435770

Jeremy Ranch is a community within the Summit Park census-designated place in Summit County, Utah, United States.

== Description ==
The community is located in Toll Canyon (at the head of East Canyon) on Interstate 80 about 9 miles (14 km) northwest of Park City and about 15 miles (24 km) east of Salt Lake City in an area previously known as Gorgoza. East Canyon Creek flows northwest through the community and on through East Canyon.

The community has the well known Jeremy Ranch Golf Course, which was designed by Arnold Palmer. The community sits at an elevation of 6,400 feet (2,000 m) in the Wasatch Range of the Rocky Mountains. The Jeremy Ranch Elementary School (of the Park City School District) is located within the community.
