= High West Distillery =

Producer of spirits in Park City, Utah, USA

Coordinates: 40°38′48″N 111°29′55″W

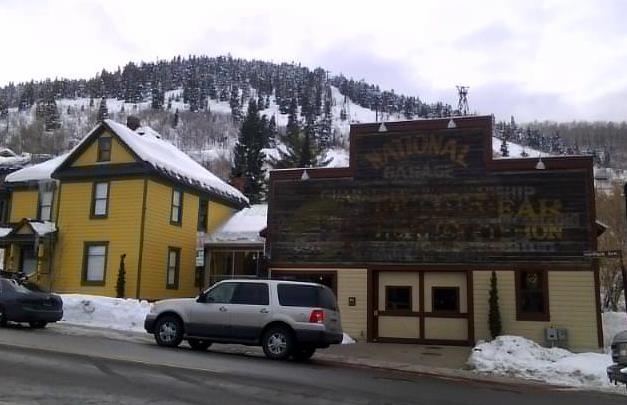
- The High West Distillery & Saloon in Park City, Utah
- Company type: Private
- Founded: 2007
- Headquarters: Park City, Utah, United States
- Products: Bourbon whiskey Rye whiskey Vodka
- Website: highwest.com

High West Distillery is a manufacturer of distilled spirits located in Park City, Utah, United States. It is the first legally licensed distillery in Utah since the end of the American Prohibition.

== Distillery, restaurant, and saloon ==
The distillery operates, along with a saloon and restaurant, in an old livery stable dubbed "The National Garage", and in the adjacent historic Ellsworth J Beggs house, a two-story box house that was built in 1907. The house is on the National Register of Historic Places.

== Distillation ==
High West makes its spirits in small batches in a 250-gallon copper pot still. High West uses a combination still, which allows for both use as either a continuous/reflux still or separately a pot still; this allows for a variety of unique distillates to be produced. In a July 28, 2014 article, it was revealed that many High West products, sold as "craft whiskeys" or "artisanal spirits", are actually modified from products purchased from MGP Distillery of Lawrenceburg, Indiana.

== Products ==
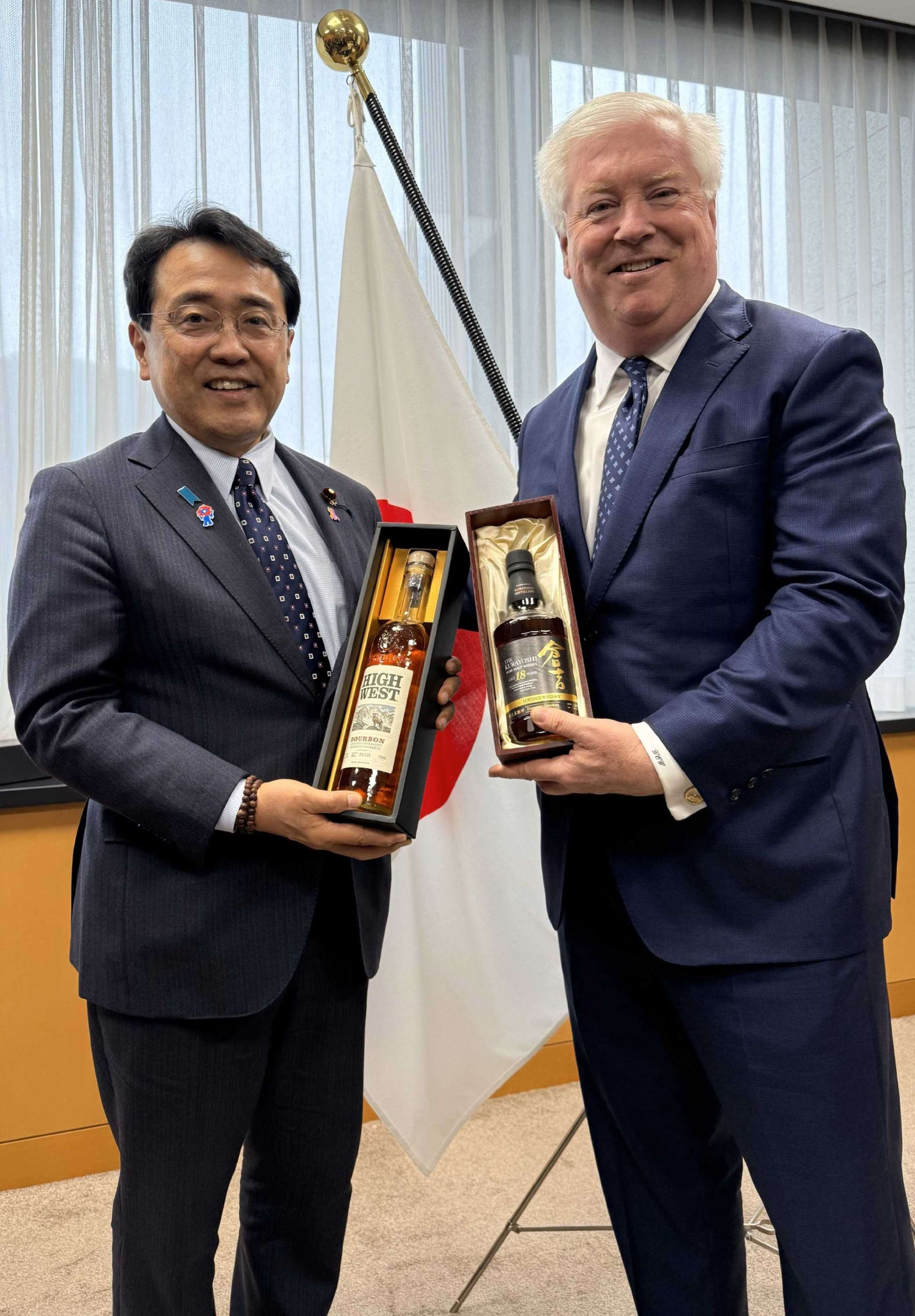
George Edward Glass presented High West to Ryōsei Akazawa in Japan on April 23, 2025. Akazawa presented Kurayoshi to Glass.

Rendezvous Rye Whiskey was the first commercial offering from High West Distillery. Originally, Rendezvous Rye was not distilled in Utah, but instead a blend of a 6-year-old 95% rye whiskey and 16-year-old 80% rye whiskey sourced from MGP (Indiana) and Barton (Kentucky) respectively. The whiskey was blended in Utah by High West using water from local sources. Rendezvous Rye was a 2008 Winner of a Double Gold Medal at San Francisco Spirits competition. It received a Malt Advocate Rating of 95 in the September 2008 issue, Batch #10, and was one of Malt Advocate Magazine's "Top 10 New Whiskies of 2008."

High West does distill and age its own whiskey, and over time has blended it into their existing products. Today, the previously award winning Rendezvous Rye carries a much younger age statement (4–7 years). High West has received some criticism for selling its own younger distillate under the same brand equity as the original sourced, much older, product.

Other regularly released products include their American Prairie Bourbon, which is still sourced from MGP and other undisclosed distilleries, aged 2–13 years; Double Rye!, a blend of 2-7 year old rye whiskeys sourced from MGP and using High West's own distillate; and Campfire, a 4-8 year old blend of MGP and High West rye whiskeys, MGP bourbon, and an undisclosed source of blended Malt Scotch whiskey.

Limited releases include BOURYE: Limited Sighting, which is a blend of a straight rye whiskey and two straight bourbon whiskeys - all sourced from MGP (non-age stated), and A Midwinter's Night Dram, a non-age stated blend of MGP and High West rye whiskeys. Both are released annually in limited amounts.

Discontinued releases include Yippee Ki-Yay, a blend of 2 year old High West rye whiskey and 16 year old sourced rye whiskey finished in used vermouth and syrah French oak barrels. Launched in 2015, only less than 30,000 bottles were ever produced. High West announced its discontinuation in July 2020.

== See also ==
- Farnell (cocktail)
