= GAPA Launch Site and Blockhouse =

Historic NRHP launch site

- U.S. National Register of Historic Places
- Location within Utah Location within the United States
- Nearest city: Knolls, Utah
- Coordinates: 40°49′40″N 113°12′4″W
- Area: 5 acres (2.0 ha)
- Built: 1946
- Built by: Boeing Airplane Co. Facilities Dept.
- NRHP reference No.: 80003972
- Added to NRHP: August 26, 1980

The GAPA Launch Site and Blockhouse near Knolls in Tooele County, Utah dates from 1946. It is a work of the Boeing Airplane Co. Facilities Dept.

It was listed on the National Register of Historic Places in 1980. The listing included one contributing structure and one contributing site.

It is significant as the first launch site for the Ground-to-Air Pilotless Aircraft (GAPA) program of the U.S. Air Force, which was a supersonic guided missile system that preceded the Bomarc air defense missile.

According to its NRHP nomination, the site was "the birthplace of the United States Air Force supersonic missile flight test program."
