= Interstate 80 Business (West Wendover, Nevada–Wendover, Utah) =

Interstate Highway business loop in Nevada and Utah in the United States

Interstate 80 Business
- A map of I-80 Bus through the two cities and their location on the interstate border

Route information
- Business route of I-80
- Maintained by the city of West Wendover and UDOT
- Length: 2.26 mi (3.64 km) 0.9 mi (1.4 km) in Nevada; 1.363 mi (2.194 km) in Utah
- History: Established: 1925 (Victory Highway), 1926 (US 40), 1969 (SR-58), 1976 (SR 224), 1980s (BL-80)

Major junctions
- West end: I-80 / US 93 Alt. in West Wendover, Nevada
- US 93 Alt. in West Wendover, Nevada
- East end: I-80 near Wendover, Utah

Location
- Country: United States
- States: Nevada, Utah
- Counties: Nevada: Elko; Utah: Tooele

Highway system
- Interstate Highway System; Main; Auxiliary; Suffixed; Business; Future
- Nevada State Highway System; Interstate; US; State; Pre‑1976; Scenic
- Utah State Highway System; Interstate; US; State; Minor; Scenic
← SR 223	SR 224 (NV)	→ SR 225
← SR-57	SR-58 (UT)	→ SR-59

Interstate 80 Business (I-80 Bus.) is an unofficial business loop of Interstate 80 (I-80) that is 2.26 miles (3.64 km) long and serves as the main street for the US cities of West Wendover, Nevada, and Wendover, Utah, along a roadway named Wendover Boulevard. Wendover Boulevard was originally part of US Route 40 (US 40), which connected California to New Jersey via Nevada and Utah. A portion of the Nevada segment runs concurrently with US 93 Alternate (US 93 Alt.), and the entire portion in Utah is coterminous with State Route 58 (SR-58). The Nevada Department of Transportation (NDOT) applied for the business loop designation in the early 1980s, but the designation has never been approved; nevertheless, signs are posted in both states. Between July 1976 and 1993, I-80 Bus was concurrent with State Route 224 (SR 224) in Nevada.

== Route description ==
Starting at the easternmost Nevada exit of I-80, I-80 Bus. heads south along Florence Way, concurrent with US 93 Alt. until it intersects with, and turns east onto Wendover Boulevard. Just west of the intersection, the highway passes the West Wendover City Hall, which houses the West Wendover Municipal Court and Eastline Justice Court. Traveling east along Wendover Boulevard, I-80 Bus. passes by the Peppermill Wendover casino, the West Wendover Visitors Center, and Scobie Park. US 93 Alt. turns south toward Ely, while I-80 Bus. continues east until it reaches the Montego Bay Resort and Wendover Nugget casinos. The casinos are connected via a skybridge that allows pedestrian access between the hotels without crossing the highway. A line painted on the street marks the Nevada–Utah border. At the border, I-80 Bus. becomes coterminous with SR-58 for the final stretch through Wendover, Utah.

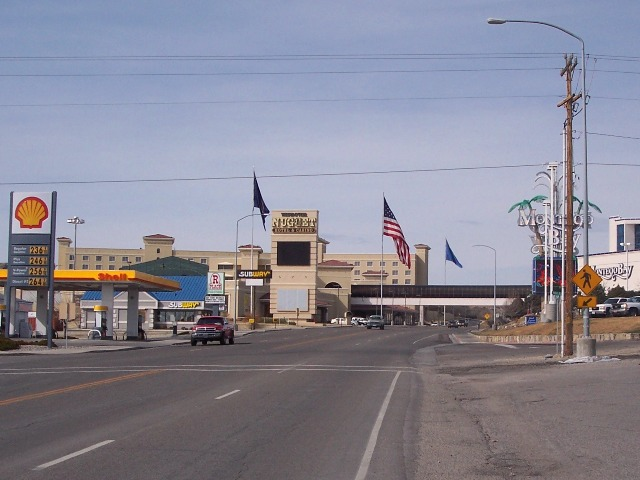
I-80 Bus. in Wendover, Utah, looking west

I-80 Bus. continues to the east past Aria Boulevard, which to the north connects to I-80 and to the south leads to the historic Wendover Air Force Base, where the 509th Composite Group was stationed while it prepared to conduct atomic bomb attacks against Japan during 1944 and 1945. The highway briefly parallels the Shafter Subdivision of the Union Pacific Railroad's Central Corridor, which was formerly part of the Feather River Route of the Western Pacific Railroad. As the highway travels east toward a half trumpet interchange with I-80, the number of lanes drops from five to two. Traffic from I-80 Bus. can access eastbound I-80 or turn off onto Frontage Road; however, to access westbound I-80, travelers must continue eastbound until the next exit and turn around. Traffic into Wendover can access I-80 Bus. from both directions of I-80, and from Frontage Road.

The Utah segment of I-80 Bus. is codified into Utah law as Utah Code §72-4-111. Every year, the Utah Department of Transportation (UDOT) conducts a series of surveys on its highways to measure traffic volume. In 2009, UDOT calculated that an average of 2,370 vehicles per day traveled on I-80 Bus. at the state line. This is a significant decrease from the traffic counts earlier in the decade, which measured 11,205 vehicles in 2006, 10,345 in 2005, and 13,840 in 2004. Of this traffic, 21 percent consists of trucks.

== History ==
A roadway, now named Wendover Boulevard, has existed since June 23, 1925, when the Victory Highway was completed through Wendover. Then governors George Dern of Utah and James G. Scrugham of Nevada, as well as the Secretary of Agriculture William Marion Jardine were present to open the highway. Bill Smith and Herman Eckstein opened a filling station at the present location of Wendover Nugget at a cost of $500 early in 1926 (equivalent to $7,073 in 2024). To welcome travelers to his station, he installed a light bulb at the top of a tall pole, which served as the only light in the desert. The earlier Lincoln Highway was rerouted to follow the Victory Highway through the region by an order of the Lincoln Highway Association executive committee on October 18, 1926.

Wendover Boulevard was numbered US 40 through what are now the cities of West Wendover and Wendover beginning in 1926. US 40 was the major thoroughfare between San Francisco, in the west, and Atlantic City, New Jersey, in the east. US 40 was routed along the Wendover Cut-off, now known as Frontage Road, which was retained as a service road after the completion of the I-80. The US 40 designation was removed by 1976 or 1977, when I-80 was completed through the area. The designation of roadway now numbered US 93 Alt. has changed twice in the past. Between 1932 and 1953, it was designated US 50, and, between 1954 and either 1978 or 1979, it was designated US 50 Alt.

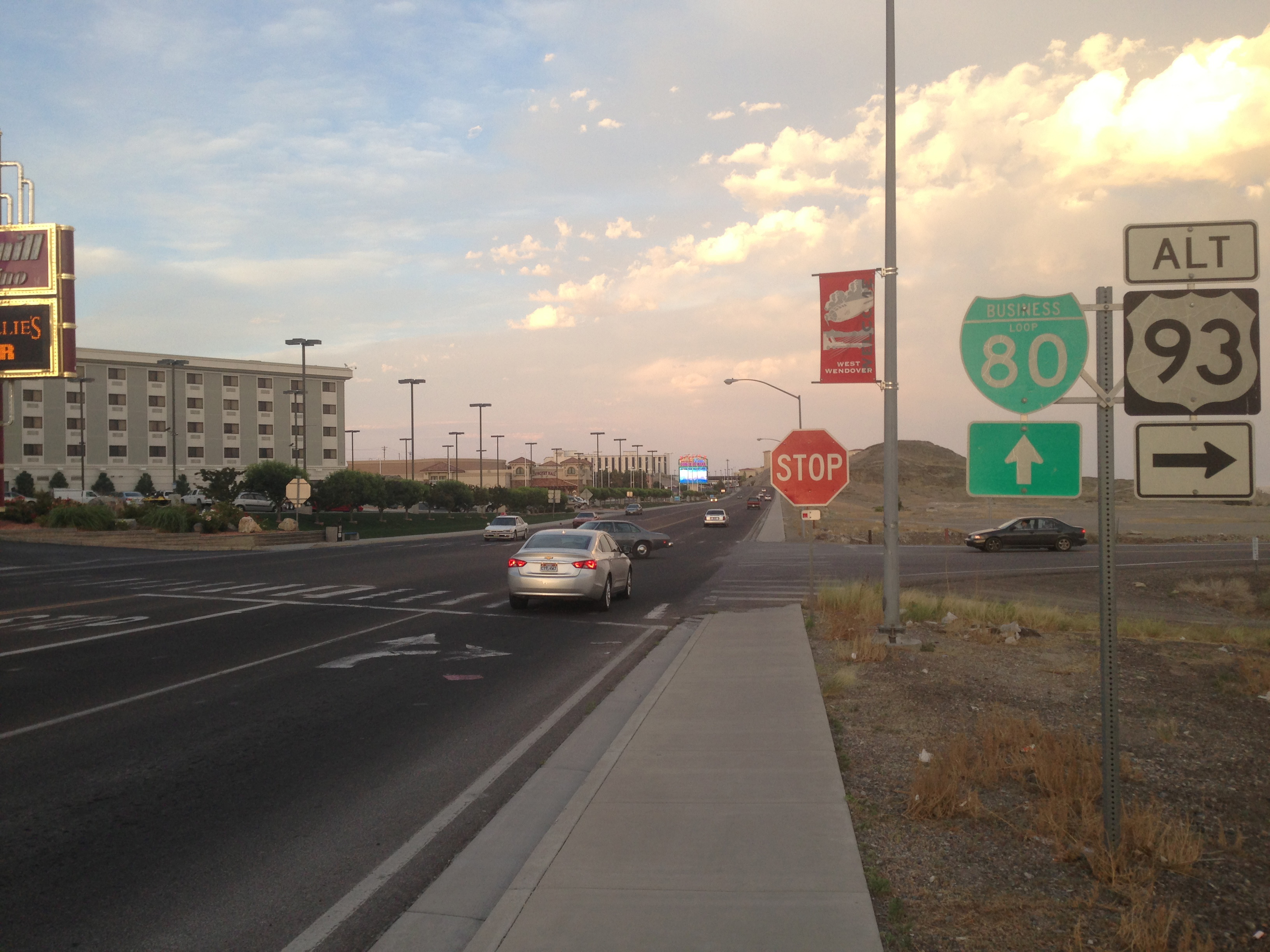
I-80 Bus. in West Wendover, Nevada, traveling east approaching the Utah state line

Two other roads have been numbered SR-58 in the past. The first route designated SR-58 was formed in 1945 between SR-36 and Clover, but was decommissioned in 1953. The second road to use the designation was formed in 1965 between I-15 in New Harmony back to I-15 via Kanarraville, but that road was decommissioned in 1969. The current SR-58 was codified into Utah law in 1969 between the state line and the junction with Frontage Road, which was formerly US 40. Wendover Boulevard between US 93 Alt and the state line was designated SR 224 between July 1, 1976, and April 28, 1993, when the highway was transferred to Elko County.

Even though I-80 Bus. is signed in both Nevada and Utah, the route has never been officially designated a business loop by the American Association of State Highway and Transportation Officials (AASHTO) or by the Utah State Legislature. NDOT applied for the designation, but, in July 1982, the application was deferred by AASHTO until Utah submitted a request for a business loop. No such request has ever been submitted.

Prior to 2007, I-80 Bus. was the only connection to the city of Wendover from Utah. However, a new partial diamond interchange, which allows traffic from I-80 to exit going westbound and for traffic to enter I-80 eastbound, at Aria Boulevard was constructed. The Aria Boulevard interchange was first planned in 2005.

In 2007, the city of West Wendover had two historical markers installed along I-80 Bus., one at the state line and the other at the intersection of US 93 Alt. to commemorate the Victory Highway and US 40.

== Major intersections ==
State	County	Location	mi (Note: Mileage resets at state line)	km	Destinations	Notes
Nevada	Elko	West Wendover	0.00	0.00	US 93 Alt. north / I-80 – Elko	Western end of US 93 Alt. concurrency; western terminus of I-80 Bus.; former western terminus of SR 224; I-80 exit 410
Nevada	Elko	West Wendover	0.28	0.45	US 93 Alt. south – Ely	Eastern end of US 93 Alt. concurrency
Nevada–Utah line	Elko–Tooele county line	West Wendover–Wendover line	0.90 0.000	1.45 0.000	SR-58 east	Western end of SR-58 concurrency; western terminus of SR-58; former eastern terminus of SR 224
Utah	Tooele	Wendover	1.280	2.060	Wendover Cut-off (Frontage Road)	Former US-40
Utah	Tooele	Wendover	1.363	2.194	I-80 east – Salt Lake, Bonneville Speedway	Eastern end of SR-58 concurrency; eastern terminus of I-80 Bus. and SR-58; no access to I-80 west; I-80 exit 2
1.000 mi = 1.609 km; 1.000 km = 0.621 mi: Concurrency terminus

== See also ==
- Interstate 80 Business (Nevada) for other business routes of I-80 in Nevada
