= Street suffix =

Name suffix

A street suffix is the part of a street or road name that describes what type of road it is. Examples include "street", "avenue", "boulevard", "lane", "highway", and "drive". As they are commonly repeated between roads, they are often abbreviated; for example, "St." instead of "Street". The way street suffixes are used varies around the world.

== United Kingdom ==
In the United Kingdom, some councils maintain lists of locally approved suffixes for new roads.

=== Example ===
For example, Haringey Council in London provides this guidance:

==== Allowed ====
- Road for any thoroughfare
- Street for any thoroughfare
- Way for major roads
- Avenue for residential roads, typically tree-lined
- Drive for residential roads
- Lane for residential roads
- Grove for residential roads, usually a cul-de-sac
- Gardens subject to there being no confusion with any local open space
- Place subject to there being no confusion with any local open space
- Circus for a Circus or for a large roundabout
- Crescent for a crescent-shaped road
- Bypass for a dual carriageway or motorway that bypasses a nearby village, city or town
- Close for a cul-de-sac only
- Square for a square only
- Hill for a hillside road only
- Mews provided it does not repeat the name of the road from which access is gained
- Vale for residential roads (only for exceptional circumstances)
- Rise/Row for residential roads (only for exceptional circumstances)
- Mead/Wharf for residential roads (only for exceptional circumstances)

==== Disallowed (but common in other parts of the UK) ====
- End
- Court
- Cross
- Side
- View
- Walk
- Park
- Meadow
- Green
- Quadrant
- Gate
- Gait

However other suffixes may be used elsewhere in the UK (for example "Terrace" and "Green" are common), and it is by no means unusual for a street to be called by a name alone, without any suffix. It is also common for different streets in the same immediate area to have the same name but to be distinguished by different suffixes. It is also common for a street to have more than one suffix (e.g. "Park Gardens" or "Meadow Road". In Wales it is common to use Welsh-language suffixes (which actually usually precede the name) such as Ffordd, Heol, Stryd, Cae.

Some of the limitations used by Haringey are not relevant elsewhere, for example "lane" is often used for a minor rural road between fields, perhaps with no houses, and "way" is sometimes used for minor residential roads.

==== Regional variations ====
- Brow, in Cumbria
- Brae, in Scotland
- Shute, on the Isle of Wight
- Wynd in Scotland and Northern England

== Mainland Europe ==
A few points of note on street suffixes in mainland Europe:

- In some languages the "street suffix" precedes the name and is thus a "street prefix" (rue Pasteur)
- In some languages the street suffix is not a separate word but is included in the same word as the rest of the name (Marktstraße). This can sometimes be confusing to the uninitiated, especially if the main part of the name has more than one word, e.g. Frederik Hendriklaan
- In some countries, occasionally a phrase is used instead of a suffix, e.g. Auf dem Hügel for Hill Street
- In some bilingual countries, multiple-language suffixes might appear at the same time in one street name phrase, to avoid repeating the main name, e.g. in Belgium rue Van der Schrickstraat (instead of being double billed as rue Van der Schrick / Van der Schrickstraat)

== United States ==
Many local governments now require a street-name suffix to comply with emergency telephone rules intended to avoid spoken confusion, e.g. spoken Broadway could be misidentified as Broad Way. Notwithstanding this, some street names historically and linguistically do not carry a suffix, e.g. Broadway, Rampart, Embarcadero. This list below has examples of suffix forms that are primary street suffix names, common street suffixes or suffix abbreviations, recommended by the United States Postal Service. Commonly used street abbreviations are within parentheses.

- Alley (Allee, Ally, or Aly)
- Annex (Anex, Annx, or Anx)
- Arcade (Arc)
- Avenida
- Avenue (Av, Ave, Aven, Avenu, Avn, or Avnue)
- Bayou (Bayoo or Byu)
- Beach (Bch)
- Bend (Bnd)
- Bluff (Bluf or Blf)
- Bluffs (Blfs)
- Bottom (Bot, Bottm, or Btm)
- Boulevard (Boul, Boulv, Bld, Blv, or Blvd)
- Branch (Brnch or Br)
- Bridge (Brdge or Brg)
- Brook (Brk)
- Brooks (Brks)
- Burg (Bg)
- Burgs (Bgs)
- Bypass (Bypa, Bypas, Byps, or Byp)
- Calle
- Camino
- Camp (Cmp or Cp)
- Canyon (Canyn, Cnyn, or Cyn)
- Cape (Cpe)
- Causeway (Causwa or Cswy)
- Center (Cen, Cent, Centr, Centre, Cnter, Cntr, or Ctr)
- Centers (Ctrs)
- Circle (Circ, Circl, Crcl, Crcle, or Cir)
- Circles (Cirs)
- Cliff (Clf)
- Cliffs (Clfs)
- Club (Clb)
- Common (Cmn)
- Commons (Cmns)
- Corner (Cor)
- Corners (Cors)
- Course (Crse)
- Court (Ct)
- Courts (Cts)
- Cove (Cv)
- Coves (Cvs)
- Creek (Crk)
- Crescent (Crsent, Crsnt, or Cres)
- Crest (Crst)
- Crossing (Crssng or Xing)
- Crossroad (Xrd)
- Curve (Curv)
- Dale (Dl)
- Dam (Dm)
- Divide (Div, Dvd, or Dv)
- Drive (Driv, Drv, or Dr)
- Drives (Drs)
- Estate (Est)
- Estates (Ests)
- Expressway (Exp, Expr, Express, Expw, Expwy, or Expy)
- Extension (Extn, Extnsn, or Ext)
- Extensions (Exts)
- Fall
- Falls (Fls)
- Ferry (Frry or Fry)
- Field (Fld)
- Fields (Flds)
- Flat (Flt)
- Flats (Flts)
- Ford (Frd)
- Fords (Frds)
- Forest (Frst)
- Forge (Forg or Frg)
- Forges (Frgs)
- Fork (Frk)
- Forks (Frks)
- Fort (Frt or Ft)
- Freeway (Freewy, Frway, Frwy, or Fwy)
- Garden (Gardn, Grden, Grdn, or Gdn)
- Gardens (Gdns)
- Gateway (Gatewy, Gatway, Gtway, Gtwy)
- Glen (Gln)
- Glens (Glns)
- Green (Grn)
- Greens (Grns)
- Grove (Grov or Grv)
- Groves (Grvs)
- Harbor (Harb, Harbr, Hrbor, or Hbr)
- Harbors (Hbrs)
- Haven (Hvn)
- Heights (Hts)
- Highway (Highwy, Hiway, Hiwy, Hway, or Hwy)
- Hill (Hl)
- Hills (Hls)
- Hollow (Hllw, Holw, or Holws)
- Inlet (Inlt)
- Island (Is)
- Islands (Iss)
- Isle
- Junction (Jction, Jctn, Junctn, Juncton, or Jct)
- Junctions (Jcts)
- Key (Ky)
- Keys (Kys)
- Knoll (Knol or Knl)
- Knolls (Knls)
- Lake (Lk)
- Lakes (Lks)
- Land
- Landing (Lndng or Lndg)
- Lane (La or Ln)
- Light (Lgt)
- Lights (Lgts)
- Loaf (Lf)
- Lock (Lck)
- Locks (Lcks)
- Lodge (Ldge, Lodg, or Ldg)
- Loop (Lp)
- Mall
- Manor (Mnr)
- Manors (Mnrs)
- Meadow (Mdw)
- Meadows (Medows or Mdws)
- Mews
- Mill (Ml)
- Mills (Mls)
- Mission (Msn)
- Motorway (Mtwy)
- Mount (Mt)
- Mountain (Mtn)
- Mountains (Mtns)
- Neck (Nck)
- Orchard (Orchrd or Orch)
- Oval (Ovl)
- Overlook (Ovlk)
- Overpass (Opas)
- Park (Prk)
- Parks (Park)
- Parkway (Parkwy, Pkway, Pky, or Pkwy)
- Parkways (Pkwys)
- Pass
- Passage (Psge)
- Path
- Pike (Pk)
- Pine (Pne)
- Pines (Pnes)
- Place (Pl)
- Plain (Pln)
- Plains (Plns)
- Plaza (Plza or Plz)
- Point (Pt)
- Points (Pts)
- Port (Prt)
- Ports (Prts)
- Prairie (Prr or Pr)
- Radial (Rad, Radiel, or Radl)
- Ramp (Rmp)
- Ranch (Rnch or Rnchs)
- Rapid (Rpd)
- Rapids (Rpds)
- Rest (Rst)
- Ridge (Rdge or Rdg)
- Ridges (Rdgs)
- River (Rvr, Rivr, or Riv)
- Road (Rd)
- Roads (Rds)
- Route (Rte)
- Row
- Rue
- Run
- Shoal (Shl)
- Shoals (Shls)
- Shore (Shr)
- Shores (Shrs)
- Skyway (Skwy)
- Spring (Spng, Sprng, or Spg)
- Springs (Spgs)
- Spur
- Square (Sqr, Sqre, Squ, or Sq)
- Squares (Sqs)
- Station (Statn, Stn, or Sta)
- Strasse (the German word for street, used in Summit Park, Utah and one road in Niederwald, Texas)
- Stravenue (Strav, Straven, Stravn, Strvn, Strvnue, or Stra; unique to Tucson, Arizona)
- Stream (Streme or Strm)
- Street (Str, Strt, or St)
- Streets (Sts)
- Summit (Sumit, Sumitt, or Smt)
- Terrace (Terr or Ter)
- Throughway (Trwy)
- Trace (Trce)
- Track (Trak, Trk, or Trks)
- Trafficway (Trfy)
- Trail (Trl)
- Trailer (Trlr)
- Tunnel (Tunl)
- Turnpike (Trnpk, Turnpk, or Tpke)
- Underpass (Upas)
- Union (Un)
- Unions (Uns)
- Valley (Vally, Vlly, or Vly)
- Valleys (Vlys)
- Via
- Viaduct (Vdct, Viadct, or Via)
- View (Vw)
- Views (Vws)
- Village (Vill, Villag, Villg, or Vlg)
- Villages (Vlgs)
- Ville (Vl)
- Vista (Vist, Vst, Vsta, or Vis)
- Walk
- Wall
- Way (Wy)
- Well (Wl)
- Wells (Wls)

== Australia ==
This list has examples of suffix forms suitable for use in Australia with clear connotations of the class and type of road, recommended by Standards Australia.

- Alley (Ally) Usually narrow roadway in cities or towns, often through city block or squares.
- Approach (App) Roadway leading to an area of community interest (e.g. public open space, commercial area, beach etc.)
- Arcade (Arc) Passage having an arched roof, or any covered passageway, especially one with shops along the sides.
- Avenue (Av or Ave) Broad roadway, usually planted on each side with trees.
- Boardwalk (Bwlk) Promenade or path, especially of wooden planks, for pedestrians and sometimes vehicles, along or overlooking a beach or waterfront.
- Boulevard (Bvd or Blvd) Wide roadway, well paved, usually ornamented with trees and grass plots.
- Break (Brk) Vehicular access on a formed or unformed surface, which was originally prepared as a firebreak.
- Bypass (Bypa) Alternative roadway constructed to enable through traffic to avoid congested areas or other obstructions to movement.
- Chase (Ch) Roadway leading down to a valley.
- Circuit (Cct) Roadway enclosing an area.
- Close (Cl) Short, enclosed roadway.
- Concourse (Con) Roadway that runs around a central area (e.g. public open space or commercial area).
- Court (Ct or Crt) Short, enclosed roadway.
- Crescent (Cr or Cres) Crescent-shaped thoroughfare, especially where both ends join the same thoroughfare.
- Crest (Crst) Roadway running along the top or summit of a hill.
- Drive (Dr) Winding thoroughfare allowing a steady flow of traffic without many cross-streets.
- Entrance (Ent) Roadway connecting other roads.
- Esplanade (Esp) Level roadway, often along the seaside, lake or a river.
- Firetrail (Ftrl) Vehicular access on a formed or unformed surface, which was originally prepared as a firebreak.
- Freeway (Fwy) Express, multi-lane highway, with limited or controlled access.
- Garden (Grdn) Often a short, enclosed roadway.
- Gardens (Grdns) Often a short, enclosed roadway.
- Glade (Glde) Roadway usually in a valley of trees.
- Grange (Gra) Roadway leading to a country estate, or focal point, public open space, shopping area etc.
- Grove (Gr) Roadway that features a group of trees standing together.
- Highway (Hwy) Main road or thoroughfare, a main route. Specifically reserved for roads associated with state arterial road networks, restricted to roads of strategic importance constructed to a high standard.
- Lane (La, Ln or L) Narrow way between walls, buildings or a narrow country or city roadway.
- Loop Roadway that diverges from and re-joins the main thoroughfare.
- Mall Sheltered walk, promenade or shopping precinct.
- Mews Roadway in a group of houses.
- Parade (Pde) Public promenade or roadway that has good pedestrian facilities along the side.
- Parkway (Pwy or Pkwy) Roadway through parklands or an open grassland area.
- Passage (Psge) Narrow street for pedestrians.
- Path Roadway used only for pedestrian traffic.
- Place (Pl) Short, sometimes narrow, enclosed roadway.
- Plaza (Plza) Roadway enclosing the four sides of an area forming a market place or open space.
- Promenade (Prom) Roadway like an avenue with plenty of facilities for the public to take a leisurely walk, a public place for walking.
- Quays (Qys) Roadway leading to a landing place alongside or projecting into water.
- Ramp Access road to and from highways and freeways.
- Retreat (Rtt) Roadway forming a place of seclusion.
- Ridge (Rdge) Roadway along the top of a hill.
- Rise Roadway going to a higher place or position.
- Road (Rd) Open way or public passage primarily for vehicles.
- Square (Sq) Roadway bounding the four sides of an area to be used as an open space or a group of buildings.
- Steps (Stps) Route consisting mainly of steps.
- Street (St) Public roadway in a town, city or urban area, especially a paved thoroughfare with footpaths and buildings along one or both sides.
- Subway (Sbwy) Underground passage or tunnel that pedestrians use for crossing under a road, railway, river etc.
- Terrace (Tce) Roadway usually with houses on either side raised above the road level.
- Track (Trk) Roadway with a single carriageway. A roadway through a natural bushland region. The interpretation for both Track and Trail is limited to roadways, whereas in many areas (e.g. Tasmania) these are often associated with walking rather than vehicular movement.
- Trail (Trl) See ‘Track’.
- View Roadway commanding a wide panoramic view across surrounding areas.
- Vista (Vsta) Roadway with a view or outlook.
- Walk (Wk) Thoroughfare with restricted access used mainly by pedestrians.
- Way (Wy) Roadway affording passage from one place to another. Usually not as straight as an avenue or street.
- Wharf (Whrf) A roadway on a wharf or pier.

== Hong Kong ==
Hong Kong does not have regulations on the road and street names, but currently has some guidelines on a few suffixes, namely Road, Street, Path and Lane. There are about 50 English suffixes recorded in the street list of Lands Department in 2023.

Usually each street in Hong Kong comes with an English name and a Chinese name. While English street names follow British convention, they usually occasionally show local and international influences. Some private housing developers name roads with French and Italian names. A handful of names have prefixes rather than suffixes; for simplicity these are included with suffixes in this section.

English and Chinese terms do not necessarily correspond one-to-one. See also List of streets and roads in Hong Kong.

=== Guideline ===
- Road, a main road in a region or urban area
- Street, a primary or secondary road in a district, usually surrounding with buildings
- Path, a footpath or narrow road
- Lane, a passage or narrow road between buildings

=== Suffixes, including some prefixes ===
In order of frequency:

- Street
- Road
- Lane
- Path
- Avenue
- Drive
- Terrace
- Square
- Interchange
- Boulevard
- Circuit
- Highway
- Crescent
- Close
- Fong, Cantonese 坊
- Flyover
- Link
- Tunnel
- Bridge
- Court
- Rise
- Rue, a French word meaning Street
- Way
- Bypass
- Corridor
- Place
- Row
- Viale, an Italian word meaning Avenue
- Bazaar, see Bazaar
- Crossing
- Embankment
- Praya, see Praya
- Promenade
- Ride
- Steps
- Strand
- Wai, Cantonese 圍
- Walk
- Alley
- Approach
- Circle
- Field
- Gate
- Incline
- Junction
- Mall
- Pathway
- Quadrant
- Route
- Toi, Cantonese 臺, also simplified form 台
- View
- Yard
