= Summit Park, Utah =

- CDP
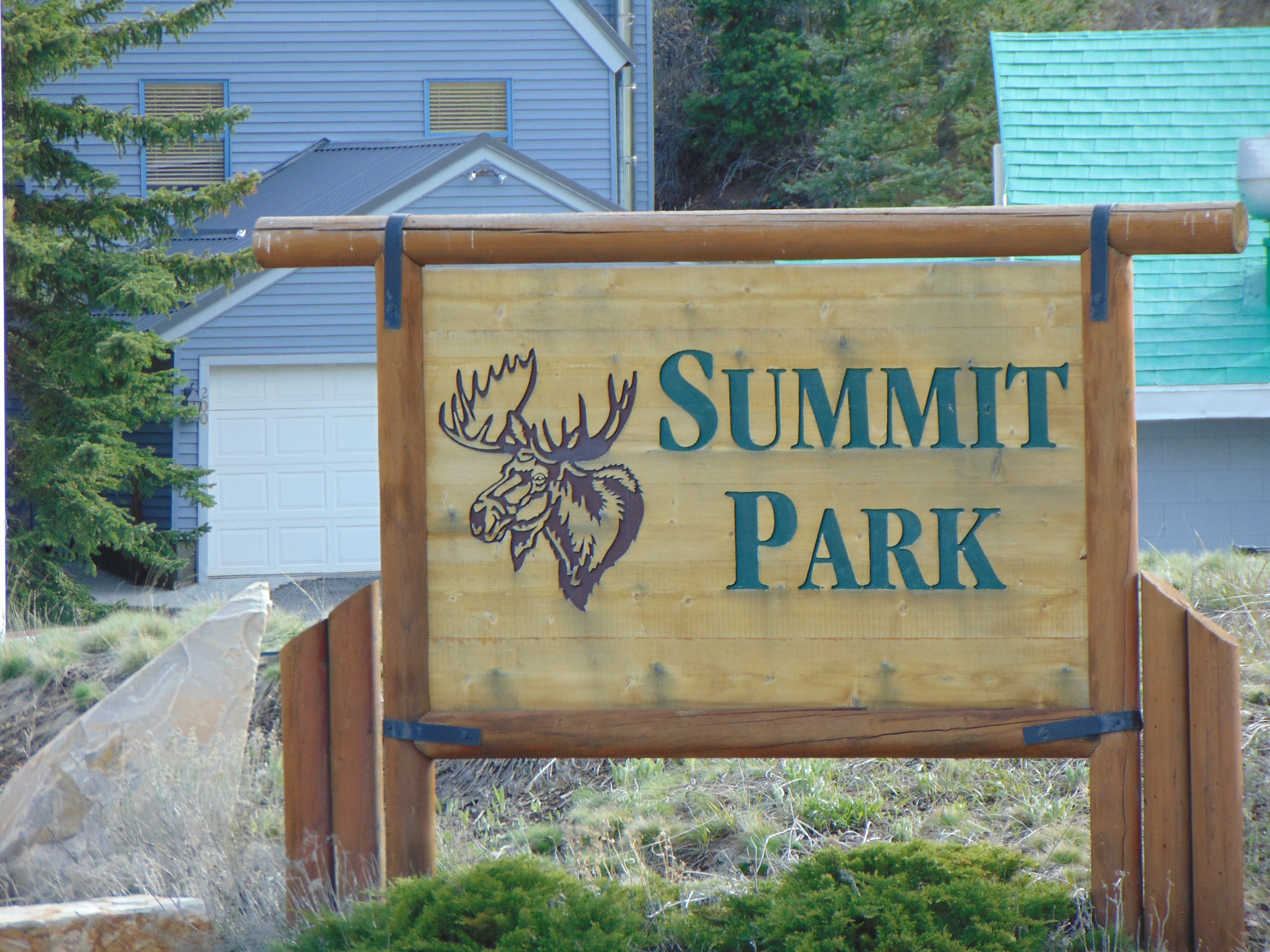
- A sign for Summit Park, just off Interstate 80, April 2016

- Location in Summit County and the state of Utah
- Coordinates: 40°45′15″N 111°35′05″W
- Country: United States
- State: Utah
- County: Summit

Area
  - Total: 21.7 sq mi (56.2 km^{2})
  - Land: 21.7 sq mi (56.2 km^{2})
  - Water: 0 sq mi (0.0 km^{2})
- Elevation: 6,782 ft (2,067 m)

Population (2020)
  - Total: 8,820
  - Density: 406/sq mi (157/km^{2})
- Time zone: UTC-7 (Mountain (MST))
  - Summer (DST): UTC-6 (MDT)
- ZIP code: 84098
- Area code: 435
- FIPS code: 49-74095
- GNIS feature ID: 2410020

Summit Park is a census-designated place (CDP) on the western edge of Summit County, Utah, United States. The population was 8,820 at the 2020 census.

== Geography ==
According to the United States Census Bureau, the CDP has a total area of 21.7 square miles (56 km^{2}), all land.

Summit Park is served by Interstate 80. As a nod to the alpine surroundings, the community hosts the rare use (in the United States) of the German street suffix Strasse: Innsbruck Strasse, Saint Moritz Strasse and Zermat Strasse.

== Demographics ==
As of the census of 2000, there were 6,597 people, 2,241 households, and 1,747 families residing in the CDP. The population density was 304.0 people per square mile (117.4/km^{2}). There were 2,508 housing units at an average density of 115.6/sq mi (44.6/km^{2}). The racial makeup of the CDP was 95.38% White, 0.27% African American, 0.33% Native American, 0.88% Asian, 0.05% Pacific Islander, 1.36% from other races, and 1.73% from two or more races. Hispanic or Latino of any race were 3.87% of the population.

There were 2,241 households, out of which 47.1% had children under the age of 18 living with them, 70.2% were married couples living together, 4.4% had a female householder with no husband present, and 22.0% were non-families. 15.3% of all households were made up of individuals, and 0.8% had someone living alone who was 65 years of age or older. The average household size was 2.94 and the average family size was 3.33.

In the CDP, the population was spread out, with 32.4% under the age of 18, 5.6% from 18 to 24, 36.7% from 25 to 44, 23.1% from 45 to 64, and 2.2% who were 65 years of age or older. The median age was 35 years. For every 100 females, there were 106.7 males. For every 100 females age 18 and over, there were 106.2 males.

The median income for a household in the CDP was $88,477, and the median income for a family was $96,194. Males had a median income of $70,527 versus $35,403 for females. The per capita income for the CDP was $37,941. About 0.4% of families and 1.3% of the population were below the poverty line, including 0.3% of those under age 18 and none of those age 65 or over.

It was listed in 2017 as the richest small town in America.

== Education ==
It is within the Park City School District. Park City High School is the district's comprehensive high school.

== Notable person ==
- James "Gerbs" Bauer, astronomer

== See also ==
- List of census-designated places in Utah
