= Wendover, Utah =

City in Utah, United States

- City
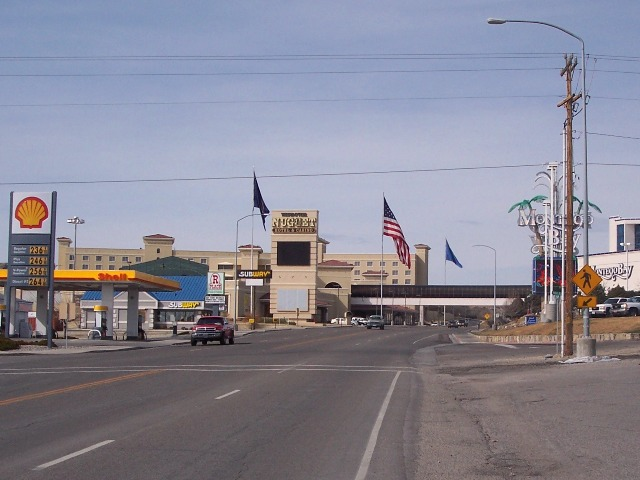
- Border between Wendover, Utah and West Wendover, Nevada, March 2006
- Interactive map of Wendover
- Location within Utah Location within the United States
- Coordinates: 40°44′25″N 114°01′29″W
- Country: United States
- State: Utah
- County: Tooele County
- Founded: 1908
- Incorporated: October 25, 1950
- Named for: "Wending over" the desert

Area
  - Total: 8.93 sq mi (23.12 km^{2})
  - Land: 8.93 sq mi (23.12 km^{2})
  - Water: 0 sq mi (0.00 km^{2})
- Elevation: 4,226 ft (1,288 m)

Population (2020)
  - Total: 1,115
  - Density: 167/sq mi (64.4/km^{2})
- Time zone: UTC−7 (Mountain (MST))
  - Summer (DST): UTC-6 (MDT)
- ZIP Code: 84083
- Area code: 435
- FIPS code: 49-82730
- GNIS feature ID: 2412214
- Website: Official website

Wendover is a city on the western edge of Tooele County, Utah, United States. The population was 1,115 at the 2020 census.

== Description ==
Wendover is on the western border of Utah and is contiguous with West Wendover, Nevada. Interstate 80 runs just north of both cities, while Interstate 80 Business (Wendover Boulevard) runs through the two cities. The Wendover Cut-off was the former path of the Victory Highway as well as U.S. Route 40 to Wendover. Today it serves as a frontage road between Wendover and Knolls just to the south of the Interstate.

== History ==
The town was established in 1908 as a station stop on the Western Pacific Railroad, then under construction. The town's name comes from either railroad surveyor Charles Wendover or from "wending over" the desert.

The transcontinental telephone line was completed as workers raised the final pole at Wendover, Utah on June 27, 1914, after construction of 3,400 miles (5,500 km) of telephone line. However, the line was not utilized until January 25, 1915, when the first transcontinental telephone call was made to coincide with the opening of the Panama Pacific Exposition.

From 1917 to 1939, a Western Pacific subsidiary known as the Deep Creek Railroad also operated into Wendover. The Western Pacific became part of the larger Union Pacific Railroad in 1983.

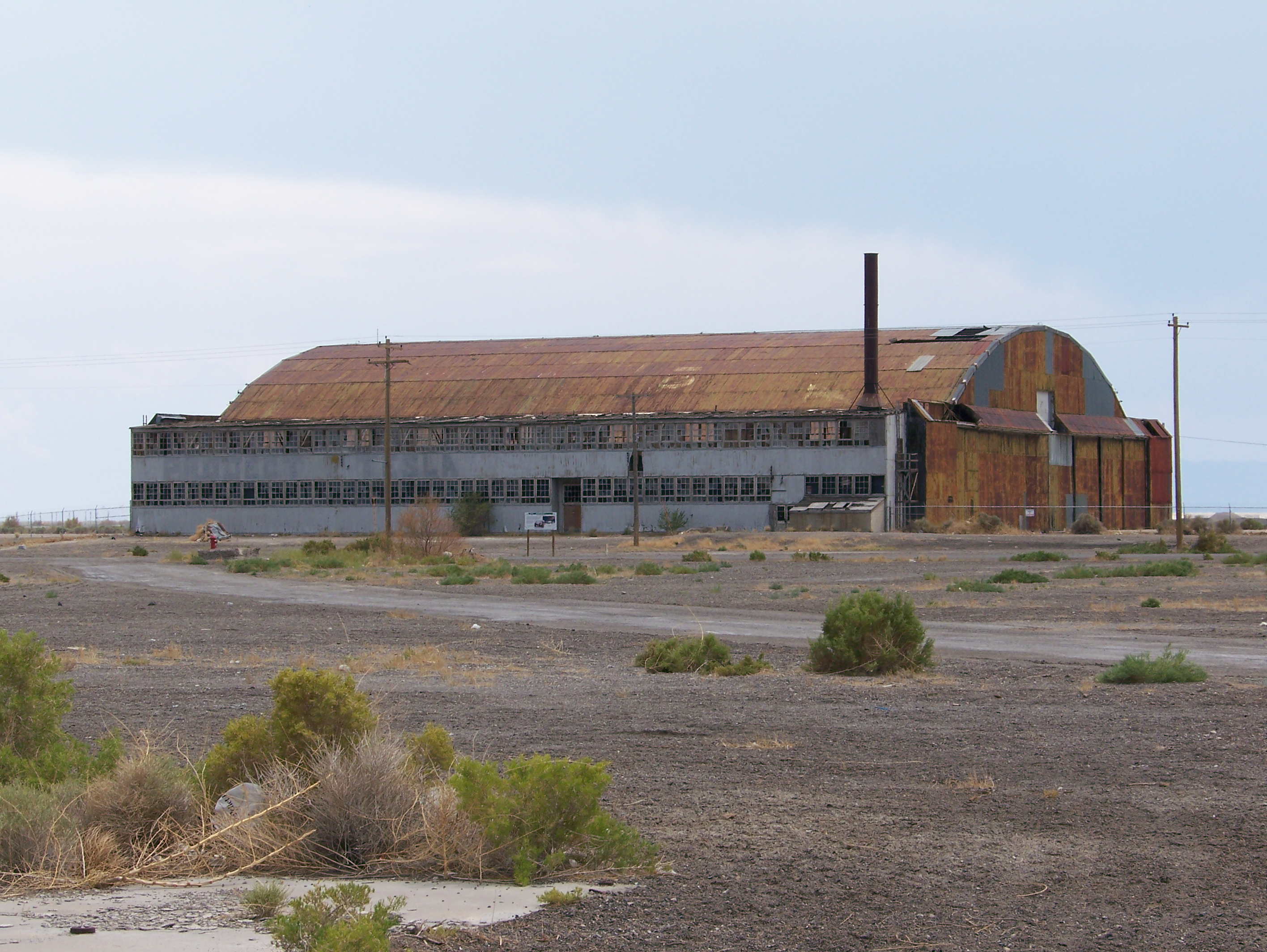
Hangar of the Enola Gay on the former Wendover Army Air Field, January 2006

During World War II, the nearby Wendover Army Air Field (later known as the Wendover Air Force Base) was a training base for bomber pilots, including the crew of the Enola Gay. The Enola Gay was stationed here until June 1945.

In 2008, the Utah Department of Transportation completed an interchange at Aria Boulevard on Interstate 80. Investment is also underway to restore the Wendover Airport (located at the former Wendover Air Force Base) which is currently managed by Tooele County.

Movements to unite Wendover with West Wendover, which is located across the border in Nevada and allows gambling operations, have taken place, but require the approval of both the U.S. Congress and the Nevada and Utah legislatures. The U.S. House of Representatives passed a resolution permitting Wendover to leave Utah and join Nevada in 2002, but the bill was stalled in the U.S. Senate and did not become law.

== Demographics ==
Historical population
Census	Pop.	Note	%±
1920	180		—
1930	205		13.9%
1940	272		32.7%
1950	814		199.3%
1960	609		−25.2%
1970	781		28.2%
1980	1,099		40.7%
1990	1,127		2.5%
2000	1,537		36.4%
2010	1,400		−8.9%
2020	1,115		−20.4%
U.S. Decennial Census

=== 2020 census ===
As of the 2020 census, Wendover had a population of 1,115; the median age was 39.0 years, 24.8% of residents were under the age of 18, and 13.4% were 65 years of age or older. For every 100 females there were 110.4 males, and for every 100 females age 18 and over there were 109.5 males age 18 and over.

94.0% of residents lived in urban areas, while 6.0% lived in rural areas.

There were 464 households in Wendover, of which 34.1% had children under the age of 18 living in them. Of all households, 39.2% were married-couple households, 32.5% were households with a male householder and no spouse or partner present, and 22.8% were households with a female householder and no spouse or partner present. About 37.7% of all households were made up of individuals and 11.6% had someone living alone who was 65 years of age or older. There were 515 housing units, of which 9.9% were vacant. The homeowner vacancy rate was 0.8% and the rental vacancy rate was 10.4%.

Racial composition as of the 2020 census
Race	Number	Percent
White	449	40.3%
Black or African American	9	0.8%
American Indian and Alaska Native	30	2.7%
Asian	4	0.4%
Native Hawaiian and Other Pacific Islander	2	0.2%
Some other race	376	33.7%
Two or more races	245	22.0%
Hispanic or Latino (of any race)	797	71.5%

=== 2000 census ===
As of the 2000 census, there were 1,537 people, 432 households, and 327 families residing in the city. The population density was 238.9 people per square mile (92.3/km^{2}). There were 510 housing units at an average density of 79.3 per square mile (30.6/km^{2}). The racial makeup of the city is 68.64% Hispanic or Latino, 43.98% White, 1.17% African American, 1.76% Native American, 0.85% Asian, 0.13% Pacific Islander, 43.59% from other races, and 8.52% from two or more races.

There were 432 households, out of which 54.9% had children under the age of 18 living with them, 56.9% were married couples living together, 11.6% had a female householder with no husband present, and 24.1% were non-families. Of all households, 16.7% were made up of individuals, and 3.5% had someone living alone who was 65 years of age or older. The average household size was 3.56 and the average family size was 4.10.

In the city, the population was spread out, with 39.9% under the age of 18, 13.0% from 18 to 24, 30.0% from 25 to 44, 13.2% from 45 to 64, and 3.9% who were 65 years of age or older. The median age was 24 years. For every 100 females, there were 106.3 males. For every 100 females age 18 and over, there were 106.7 males.

The median income for a household in the city was $31,196, and the median income for a family was $29,722. Males had a median income of $18,417 versus $20,682 for females. The per capita income for the city was $10,794. About 24.7% of families and 26.1% of the population were below the poverty line, including 29.1% of those under age 18 and 16.1% of those age 65 or over.

== Government ==
Wendover uses a city council with five council members that meet on the first and third Thursday of every month. The mayor of Wendover is Adam Palafox.

== Geography ==
According to the United States Census Bureau, the city has a total area of 6.4 square miles (16.7 km^{2}), all land.

The hillside letter W can be seen in the north. (40.7454°N 114.0297°W)

=== Climate ===
Wendover and West Wendover have a cool arid climate (Köppen BWk) with hot summers, freezing winters, and substantial diurnal temperature ranges. The cities' location east of the Ruby Mountains makes them the driest in the Great Basin, averaging only 4.58 inches or 116 millimetres of precipitation per year, or about half that of nearby Ely or Elko. It affects snowfall even more dramatically: Wendover and West Wendover average only 5.5 inches or 0.14 metres of snow, one-eighth to one-tenth the snowfall of the two nearby county seats.

Climate data for Wendover Air Force Base (1991–2020 normals, extremes 1911–2017, 2025–present)
Month	Jan	Feb	Mar	Apr	May	Jun	Jul	Aug	Sep	Oct	Nov	Dec	Year
Record high °F (°C)	64 (18)	80 (27)	81 (27)	92 (33)	103 (39)	105 (41)	112 (44)	109 (43)	103 (39)	90 (32)	78 (26)	69 (21)	112 (44)
Mean daily maximum °F (°C)	35.1 (1.7)	42.5 (5.8)	54.0 (12.2)	61.5 (16.4)	71.8 (22.1)	83.1 (28.4)	92.5 (33.6)	90.3 (32.4)	78.2 (25.7)	62.4 (16.9)	46.5 (8.1)	35.5 (1.9)	62.8 (17.1)
Daily mean °F (°C)	27.3 (−2.6)	33.9 (1.1)	43.4 (6.3)	51.0 (10.6)	60.9 (16.1)	71.1 (21.7)	79.9 (26.6)	77.4 (25.2)	66.2 (19.0)	51.7 (10.9)	37.4 (3.0)	27.6 (−2.4)	52.3 (11.3)
Mean daily minimum °F (°C)	19.6 (−6.9)	25.3 (−3.7)	32.9 (0.5)	40.5 (4.7)	50.0 (10.0)	59.2 (15.1)	67.4 (19.7)	64.6 (18.1)	54.1 (12.3)	40.9 (4.9)	28.4 (−2.0)	19.8 (−6.8)	41.9 (5.5)
Record low °F (°C)	−16 (−27)	−12 (−24)	8 (−13)	18 (−8)	26 (−3)	31 (−1)	43 (6)	34 (1)	28 (−2)	18 (−8)	5 (−15)	−18 (−28)	−18 (−28)
Average precipitation inches (mm)	0.25 (6.4)	0.17 (4.3)	0.33 (8.4)	0.36 (9.1)	0.58 (15)	0.28 (7.1)	0.22 (5.6)	0.16 (4.1)	0.50 (13)	0.34 (8.6)	0.22 (5.6)	0.19 (4.8)	3.60 (91)
Average precipitation days (≥ 0.01 in)	3.5	3.0	2.7	4.1	4.1	3.1	2.3	2.2	3.3	2.9	2.5	2.3	36.0
Source: NOAA

== Education ==
Tooele County School District's Anna Smith Elementary School serves the Wendover area.

Circa 1996, when there were talks about moving Wendover into Nevada, some area people were concerned that this would encourage the school district to stop spending funds on proposals for schools in Wendover. At the time Wendover did not have an elementary school and residents wished to have one.

== See also ==
- List of cities in Utah
