= Knolls, Utah =

Unincorporated community in the state of Utah, United States

Knolls
- Unincorporated community
- Location within Utah Location within the United States
- Coordinates: 40°43′23″N 113°17′23″W
- Country: United States
- State: Utah
- County: Tooele
- Elevation: 4,229 ft (1,289 m)
- Time zone: UTC-7 (Mountain (MST))
  - Summer (DST): UTC-6 (MDT)
- Area code: 435
- GNIS feature ID: 1437607

Knolls is an unincorporated community in north-central Tooele County, Utah, United States.

== Description ==
The community is located in Great Salt Lake Desert in the western portion of the state, close to the Utah Test and Training Range. Exit 41 on Interstate 80 (I‑80) provides access to Knolls.

Prior to the building of I‑80, Knolls was serviced by U.S. Route 40 and was the eastern terminus of the Wendover Cut-off.

During the 1970s and up until 1985 (possibly longer) one family owned and operated the entire town, consisting of a towing service, a small convenience store, a gas station, and a small motel. There was no water on site, and water had to be trucked in by a small tank truck. The town was for sale for a relatively small amount in 1985. There is photo evidence of a small tavern at one time. There is little visible evidence that there was ever any town, buildings, or gas station left.

Knolls is located in a nearly uninhabited desert area, approximately 40 miles (64 km) east of the Bonneville Salt Flats and 80 miles (130 km) west of Salt Lake City. The landscape contains mud flats, salt flats, and gypsum sand dunes. Much of the surrounding land is owned by the Bureau of Land Management and is maintained as an off highway vehicle park, known as the Knolls Recreation Area.

Knolls is the site of one place listed on the National Register of Historic Places: the GAPA Launch Site and Blockhouse, which is a concrete bunker and missile launch pad where the first Ground-to-Air Pilotless Aircraft missile was successfully tested in 1946. The site is marked by a placard installed by the Utah State History division.

Knolls is also the site of a hazardous waste dump site known as Grassy Mountain.

The community is named for the many knolls in the area.

== Climate ==
The Great Salt Lake Desert experiences a desert climate with hot summers and cold winters. The desert is an excellent example of a cold desert climate, rare outside of North America. The desert's elevation, 4,250 feet (1,300 m) above sea level, makes temperatures cooler than lower elevation deserts, such as the Mojave. Due to the high elevation and aridity, temperatures drop sharply after sunset. Summer nights are comfortably cool. Winter highs are generally above freezing, and winter nights are bitterly cold, with temperatures often dropping close to zero.

Climate data for Knolls, Great Salt Lake Desert, Utah (Elevation 4,250ft)
Month	Jan	Feb	Mar	Apr	May	Jun	Jul	Aug	Sep	Oct	Nov	Dec	Year
Record high °F (°C)	63 (17)	63 (17)	79 (26)	87 (31)	98 (37)	104 (40)	106 (41)	103 (39)	99 (37)	89 (32)	71 (22)	66 (19)	106 (41)
Mean daily maximum °F (°C)	36.5 (2.5)	41.4 (5.2)	54.4 (12.4)	62.3 (16.8)	72.3 (22.4)	83.5 (28.6)	92.8 (33.8)	90.9 (32.7)	80.0 (26.7)	64.3 (17.9)	46.5 (8.1)	36.5 (2.5)	63.4 (17.4)
Mean daily minimum °F (°C)	16.9 (−8.4)	19.3 (−7.1)	29.1 (−1.6)	36.6 (2.6)	44.9 (7.2)	54.7 (12.6)	62.1 (16.7)	59.5 (15.3)	48.0 (8.9)	34.4 (1.3)	23.3 (−4.8)	14.5 (−9.7)	37.0 (2.8)
Record low °F (°C)	−16 (−27)	−17 (−27)	−1 (−18)	14 (−10)	24 (−4)	35 (2)	43 (6)	39 (4)	25 (−4)	8 (−13)	−3 (−19)	−25 (−32)	−25 (−32)
Average precipitation inches (mm)	0.61 (15)	0.46 (12)	0.91 (23)	1.01 (26)	1.23 (31)	0.68 (17)	0.36 (9.1)	0.31 (7.9)	0.56 (14)	0.77 (20)	0.61 (15)	0.38 (9.7)	7.88 (200)
Average snowfall inches (cm)	0.3 (0.76)	0.1 (0.25)	0 (0)	0 (0)	0 (0)	0 (0)	0 (0)	0 (0)	0 (0)	0 (0)	0 (0)	0.1 (0.25)	0.5 (1.3)
Source: The Western Regional Climate Center
