= Interstate 80 in Utah =

Section of Interstate highway in Utah, United States

Interstate 80
- Dwight D. Eisenhower Highway; Purple Heart Trail
- I-80 highlighted in red for Utah section

Route information
- Maintained by UDOT
- Length: 197.51 mi (317.86 km)
- Existed: June 29, 1956–present
- History: Completed August 22, 1986
- Tourist routes: Lincoln Highway; Victory Highway
- NHS: Entire route

Major junctions
- West end: I-80 at the Nevada state line in Wendover
- SR-201 near Magna; SR-154 in Salt Lake City; I-215 in Salt Lake City; I-15 in Salt Lake City; SR-201 in Salt Lake City; I-15 in South Salt Lake; US 89 in South Salt Lake; I-215 in Millcreek; US 40 / US 189 near Park City; I-84 in Echo
- East end: I-80 / US 189 at the Wyoming state line in Evanston, WY

Location
- Country: United States
- State: Utah
- Counties: Tooele, Salt Lake, Summit

Highway system
- Interstate Highway System; Main; Auxiliary; Suffixed; Business; Future; Utah State Highway System; Interstate; US; State; Minor; Scenic
← SR-79	→ SR-81

Interstate 80 (I-80) is a part of the Interstate Highway System that runs from San Francisco, California, to Teaneck, New Jersey. The portion of the highway in the US state of Utah is 197.51 miles (317.86 km) long through the northern part of the state. From west to east, I-80 crosses the state line from Nevada in Tooele County and traverses the Bonneville Salt Flats—which are a part of the larger Great Salt Lake Desert. It continues alongside the Wendover Cut-off—the corridor of the former Victory Highway—US Route 40 (US-40) and the Western Pacific Railroad Feather River Route. After passing the Oquirrh Mountains, I-80 enters the Salt Lake Valley and Salt Lake County. A short portion of the freeway is concurrent with I-15 through Downtown Salt Lake City. At the Spaghetti Bowl, I-80 turns east again into the mouth of Parleys Canyon and Summit County, travels through the mountain range, and intersects the eastern end of I-84 near Echo Reservoir before turning northeast toward the Wyoming border near Evanston. I-80 was built along the corridor of the Lincoln Highway and the Mormon Trail through the Wasatch Range. The easternmost section also follows the historical routes of the first transcontinental railroad and US-30S.

Construction of the controlled-access highway began in the 1950s, and, by the late 1970s, most of the freeway across the state of Utah had been completed. The 4.5-mile-long (7.2 km) section of I-80 between State Route 68 (SR-68, Redwood Road) and Salt Lake City International Airport was the last piece of the nearly 2,900-mile-long (4,700 km) freeway to be completed. It was opened on August 22, 1986, and was about 50 miles (80 km) from the site of another cross-country milestone in Utah, the driving of the golden spike of the first transcontinental railroad at Promontory Summit. Average daily traffic volumes in 2012 ranged between 6,765 vehicles using the freeway at SR-58 and 121,205 vehicles using the freeway at the Spaghetti Bowl in Downtown Salt Lake City. Throughout the state, the highway is also known as the Purple Heart Trail.

== Route description ==
Out of the 11 states which I-80 passes through, the 197.51-mile-long (317.86 km) segment in Utah is the fourth shortest. As part of the Interstate Highway System, the entire route is listed on the National Highway System, a system of roads that are important to the nation's economy, defense, and mobility.

Every year, the Utah Department of Transportation (UDOT) conducts a series of surveys on its highways to measure traffic volumes. This measure is expressed in terms of annual average daily traffic (AADT), a measure of traffic volume for any average day of the year. In 2012, UDOT calculated that as few as 6,765 vehicles traveled I-80 at the interchange with SR-58 in Wendover, and as many as 121,205 vehicles used the highway at the Spaghetti Bowl in Downtown Salt Lake City. Between 7 and 58 percent of the traffic recorded consisted of trucks. These counts are for the portion of the freeway in Utah.

=== Tooele County ===
The freeway enters Utah from Nevada in the city of Wendover on the edge of the Bonneville Salt Flats. The cities of West Wendover, Nevada, and Wendover are accessible by I-80's only business loop in Utah, whose interchange is just south of Danger Cave. The highway closely follows the historical routes of the Wendover Cut-off, Victory Highway, and formerly Western Pacific Railroad's Feather River Route (now part of the Union Pacific Railroad Central Corridor) across the salt flats and the larger Great Salt Lake Desert. Bonneville Speedway, home to many land speed records, is accessible from I-80. In the middle of the salt flats is a concrete sculpture, Metaphor: The Tree of Utah, which stands just off the westbound carriageway of I-80, 30 miles (48 km) east of Wendover.

Bounded on each sides by military training grounds, the I-80 corridor is overflown by commercial airliners traveling west from Salt Lake City International Airport. The freeway veers north around the Cedar Mountains in a small gap between them and the Lakeside Mountains. Further east, the highway passes the Stansbury Mountains, which are located in the Wasatch–Cache National Forest. After the mountain ranges, the freeway arrives at the southern shore of the Great Salt Lake and closely follows the shore toward the western suburbs of Salt Lake City. However, the historical routes from which the route of I-80 was derived were routed further from the lake, passing through the towns of Grantsville and Tooele; these communities are now served by SR-138 and SR-36, respectively. It is in this section that I-80 reaches its lowest elevation in Utah, 4,203 feet (1,281 m) above sea level. After an interchange with SR-36 at Lake Point, the highway crosses a bottleneck between the Oquirrh Mountains and the Great Salt Lake.

=== Salt Lake County ===
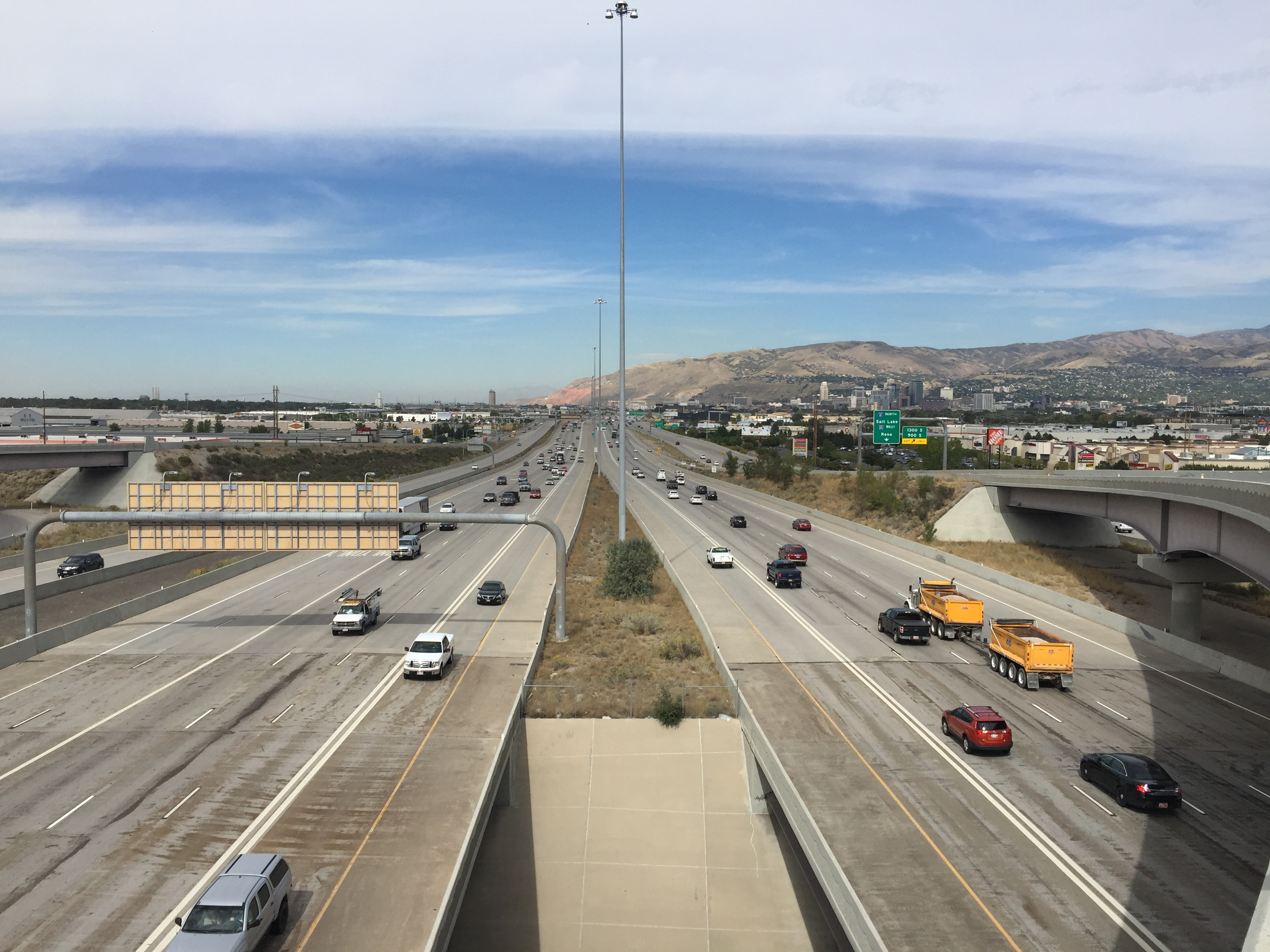
View west along I-80 at the eastern junction with I-15 and SR-201 in Salt Lake County

While traversing the neck, views can be had from I-80 of the lake and Antelope Island. After passing the neck, the road forks, with I-80 proceeding toward the north end of Salt Lake City and SR-201 proceeding toward the south end. Historically, this intersection was the separation of US-40 and US-50. After the intersection, the freeway corridor is again bottlenecked with the Great Salt Lake to the north and the Kennecott Utah Copper smelter and tailings pond to the south. The Kennecott Utah Copper's Bingham Canyon Mine, which was once considered to be the largest open-pit copper mine, can be seen in the distance. The 1,215-foot-tall (370 m) Kennecott Garfield Smelter Stack is one of the tallest freestanding structures in the United States. Along this portion, the freeway passes the historical site of Saltair.

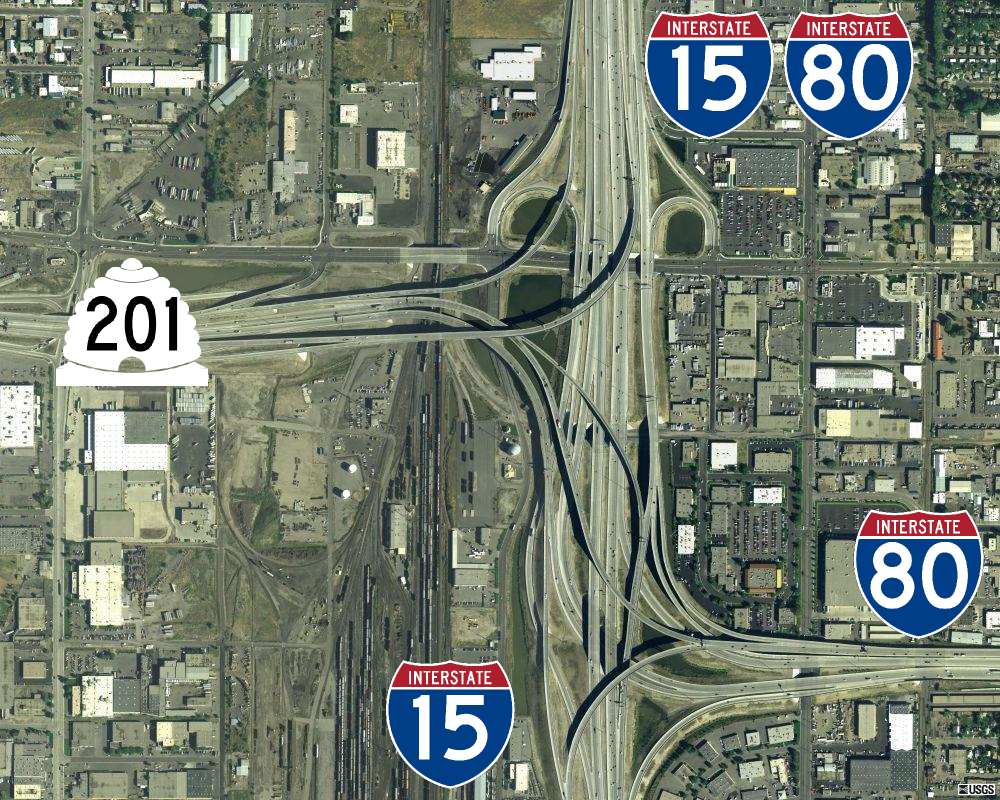
The Spaghetti Bowl in South Salt Lake

The freeway enters the Salt Lake Valley on the former alignment of North Temple Street until it passes Salt Lake City International Airport, where the freeway veers slightly south and leaves the North Temple Street corridor which leads to Temple Square in Downtown Salt Lake City. The Green Line of the Utah Transit Authority (UTA) TRAX system briefly parallels I-80 before traveling down the center of North Temple Street. I-80 becomes concurrent with I-15 after interchanges with SR-68 and 600 South and continues south for about three miles (4.8 km), passing along the western and southern edges of Downtown Salt Lake City. The southern interchange with I-15, which also includes SR-201 (21st South Freeway) and marks the end of the concurrency, is known as the Spaghetti Bowl. In the southwestern corner of the Spaghetti Bowl is another portion of the UTA TRAX Green Line as it travels towards West Valley City. After separating from I-15, the freeway continues easterly through South Salt Lake, loosely following an alignment just south of 2100 South and the UTA S Line streetcar through the Sugar House neighborhood and past Sugar House Park—once the home of the Sugar House Prison—toward the clockwise terminus of the I-215 270-degree beltway around Salt Lake City. It continues through Parleys Canyon, where the freeway joins the historical route of the Lincoln Highway. Between the mouth of the canyon and the Summit County line, the route reenters the Wasatch National Forest.

=== Summit County ===
Parleys Canyon carries I-80 up the eastern slope of the Wasatch Front as a six-lane freeway, cresting the mountains at an elevation of 7,016 feet (2,138 m) at Parleys Summit, the highest point on I-80 within the state of Utah. Both the canyon and summit were named for Parley P. Pratt, an early settler to the Salt Lake Valley and an early Mormon leader who was asked to survey a new route across the mountains to replace the route through Emigration Canyon. Between 1848 and 1851, Pratt surveyed, completed, and operated the Golden Pass toll road through the canyon that today bears his name. Pratt had unsuccessfully solicited for $800 (equivalent to $23,400 in 2024) to build the road and sold it for $1,500 (equivalent to $44,814 in 2024). On- and offramps for the Wyoming port-of-entry are located just within Utah. In January 2014, UDOT introduced variable speed limits to I-80 in Parleys Canyon, allowing a speed limit between 35 mph (56 km/h) up to the normal 65 mph (105 km/h) depending on weather or traffic conditions.

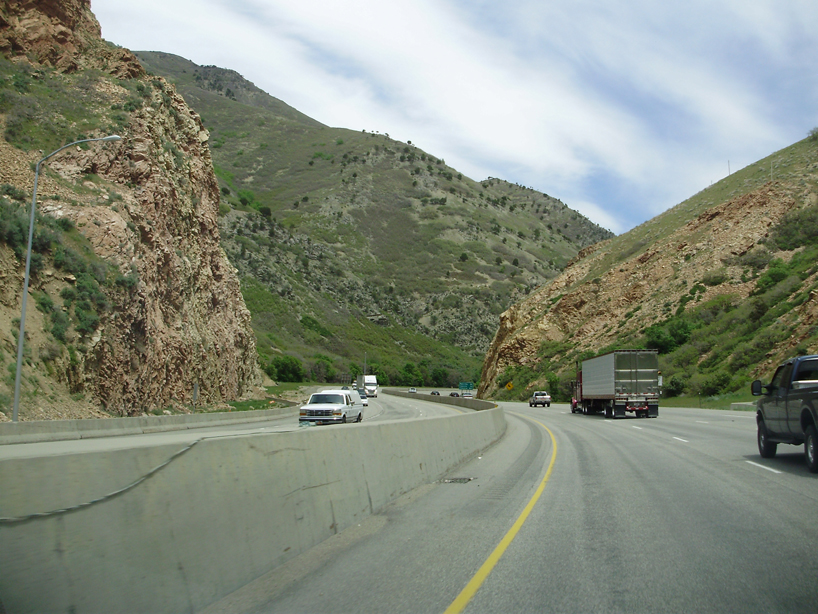
View along I-80 eastbound in Parleys Canyon

Beyond Parleys Summit lies Park City, a mining town today better known for its many ski resorts. The Historic Union Pacific Rail Trail State Park travels in the median between carriageways of I-80 before paralleling the highway until the southern end of Echo Reservoir. The freeway turns north upon reaching the Rockport Reservoir at Wanship following the tributaries of the Weber River toward Echo Reservoir and Dam. Upon reaching Echo Canyon and the junction with the eastern terminus of the western section of I-84, the freeway follows the canyon east until it reaches the Wyoming state line near Evanston. I-80 forms the northeastern border between Rich and Summit counties.

The portion through Echo Canyon follows the historical routes of the Mormon Trail, US-30S, and the first transcontinental railroad. A rest area in the canyon just east of the junction with I-84 features signs pointing out features that were obstacles for both the Mormon pioneers and the railroad construction workers, including Pulpit Rock, which was partially demolished when the I-80 was built through the canyon.

== History ==
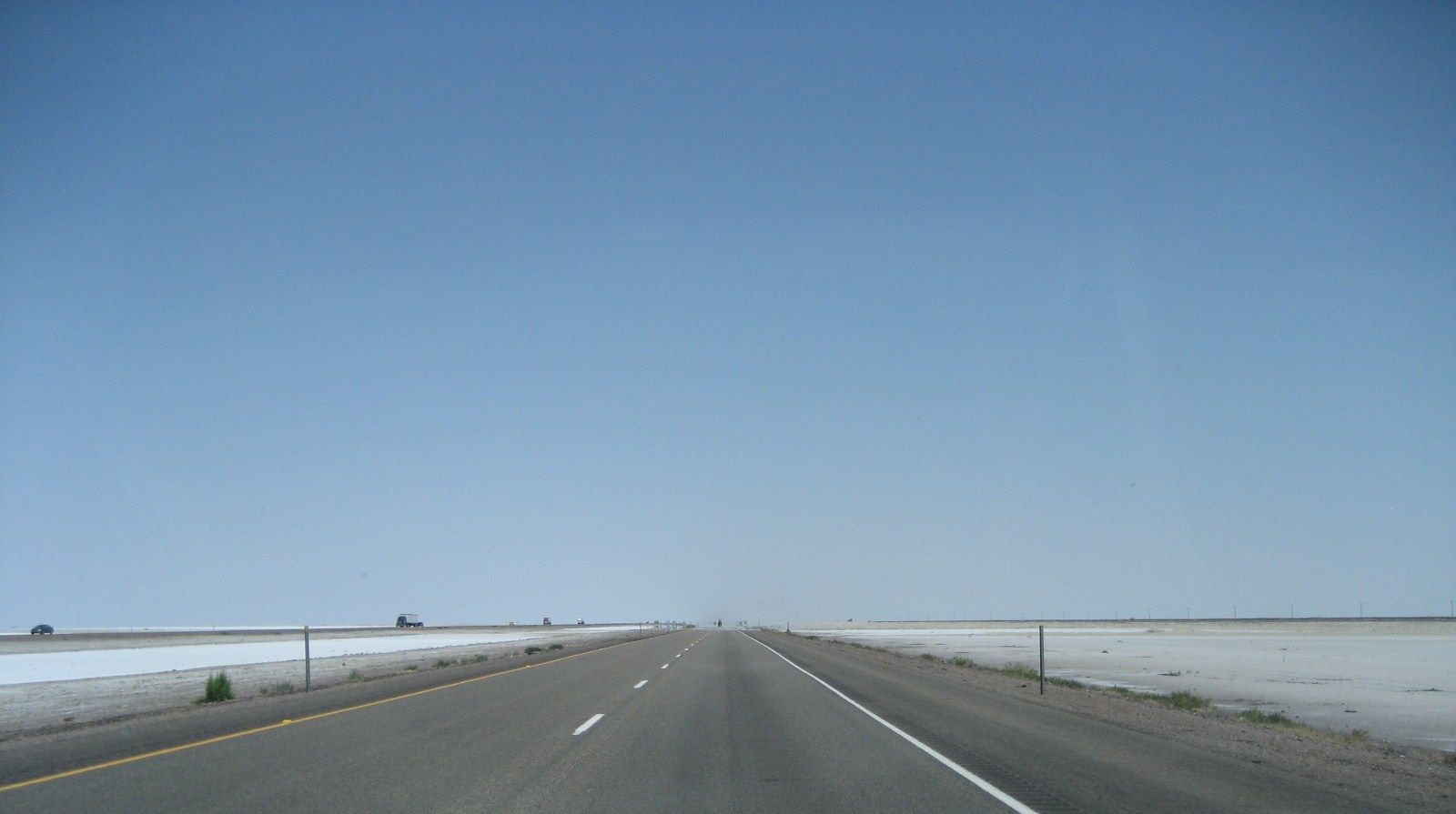
I-80 eastbound across the Bonneville Salt Flats.

=== Earlier roads ===
I-80 follows the routes of two major auto trails through the state. In western Utah, I-80 follows the historical route of the Victory Highway from Wendover at the Nevada state line to the junction of US-40 near Park City. Throughout Utah, I-80 is signed as the modern route of the Lincoln Highway—except through Salt Lake City, where the Lincoln Highway is routed along SR-201 and Parley's Way. The route of the Lincoln Highway across Utah was generally derived from the route of the Pony Express and Central Overland Route. However, much of the original route of the Lincoln Highway west of Salt Lake City is inaccessible. The original route of the Lincoln Highway proceeded southwest from Tooele toward Ely, Nevada. This area is now used for military bases, such as the Dugway Proving Ground and Tooele Army Depot. The area was closed to the public when these bases were established. I-80 and US-93 are the modern signing of the Lincoln Highway between those two cities. East of Salt Lake City, I-80 closely parallels the original route of the Lincoln Highway.

In 1926, much of the route covered by I-80, including Pratt's former toll road from the Nevada state line into Salt Lake City, was signed as US-40 then as US-30 to the Wyoming state line. It was also part of the Victory Highway west of Salt Lake and the Lincoln Highway east of Salt Lake at this time. Most of the route had been improved but some stretches of graded road remained. In 1937, parts of the route near Wanship were numbered US-530. In 1950, the highway near Echo was designated US-30S and US-189. By 1959, US-50 Alternate (US-50 Alt) was also routed along the western portion of I-80.

=== Current road ===
The first Utah state route to have the number 80 is now known as SR-92, which was originally numbered SR-80 until the 1977 Utah state route renumbering. Previously, the freeway's legislative designation was SR-2.

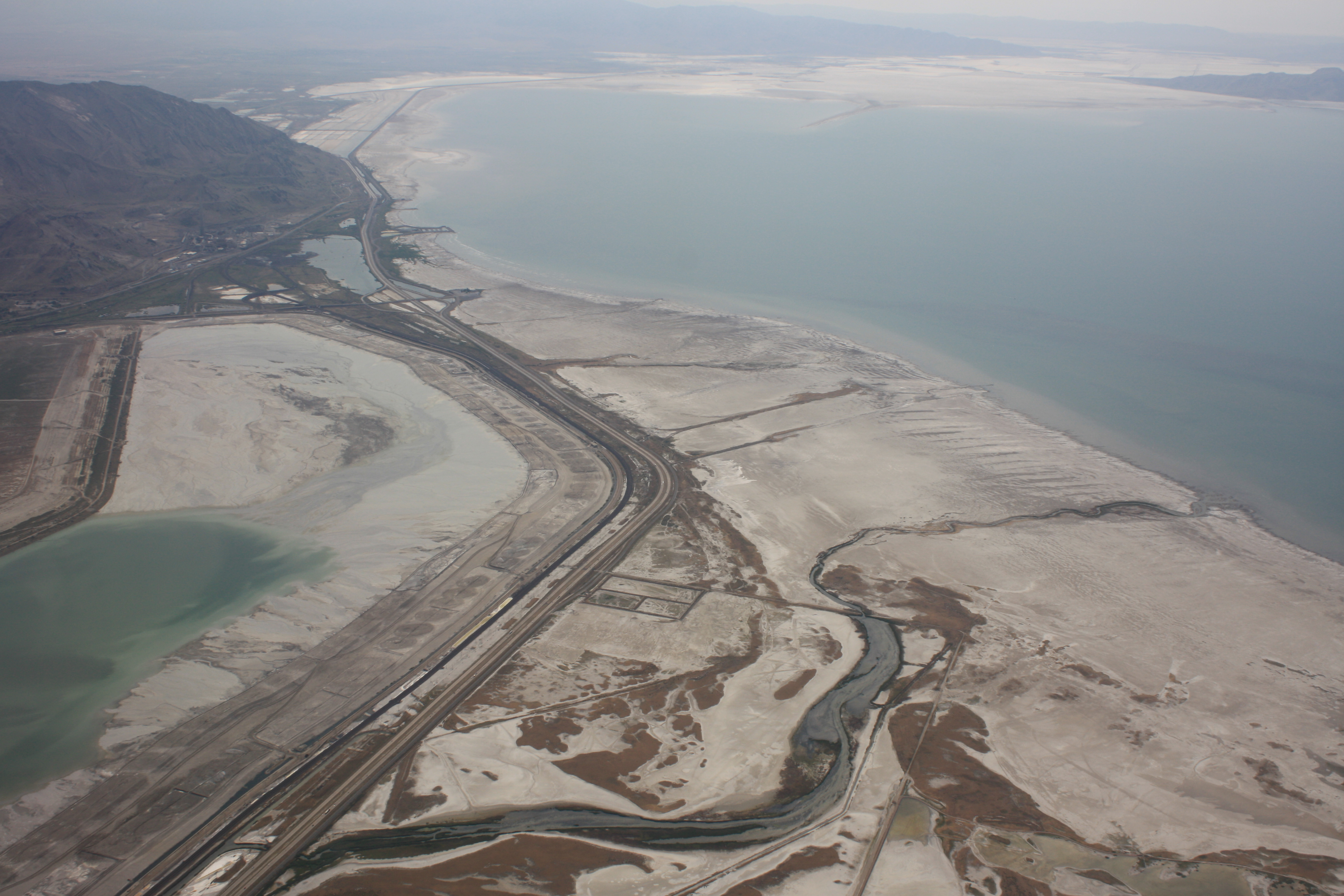
I-80 passing the Oquirrh Mountains westbound along the shores of the Great Salt Lake

Passage of the Federal-Aid Highway Act of 1956 formed the Interstate Highway System, and the I-80 number was first designated to a then-unconstructed controlled-access highway across the state by 1957. I-80 was constructed in segments, starting in the late 1950s. By the late 1970s, the Utah portion of I-80—except for a gap on the western edge of Salt Lake City—was largely complete. A 4.5-mile-long (7.2 km) section between Redwood Road and Salt Lake City International Airport is the final link of the transcontinental freeway to be completed. As an Interstate Highway, design specifications require a controlled-access highway with no at-grade intersections. This section was dedicated on August 22, 1986, and was the last to be completed to Interstate Highway specifications along the almost 2,900-mile-long (4,700 km) route of I-80 between San Francisco, California, and Teaneck, New Jersey. The section was completed close to the 30th anniversary of the Interstate Highway System, which was noted at the dedication and considered to be a milestone in the history of highway construction in the United States. It was also noted at the dedication that this was only 50 miles (80 km) south of Promontory Summit, where the golden spike of the US's first transcontinental railroad was laid.

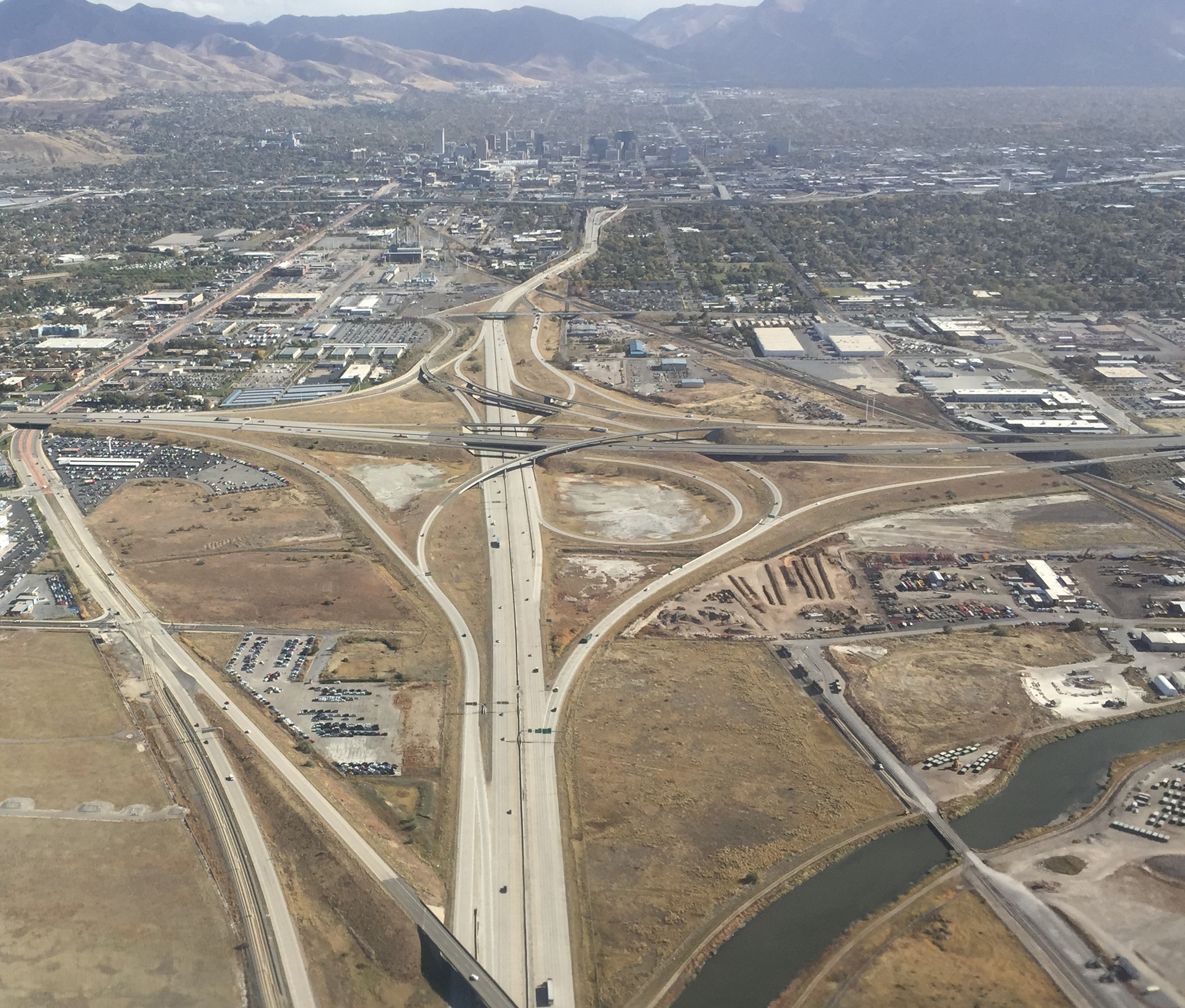
View east along I-80 toward the eastern I-215 interchange (foreground) and Downtown Salt Lake City (background)

The original designation of I-84, which begins at an interchange with I-80 in Echo, was I-80N. This designation was changed to I-84 in 1977 by the American Association of State Highway and Transportation Officials (AASHTO) despite objections from the Washington State Department of Transportation (WSDOT) and the Idaho Transportation Department (ITD) and with the support of UDOT and the Oregon Department of Transportation (ODOT). The legislative designation for this highway was SR-3 until the 1977 renumbering.

Rebuilding of the first portions of I-80 began in October 1990 with a 1.4-mile-long (2.3 km) stretch near Redwood Road in Salt Lake City. By 1991, UDOT estimated that the reconstruction of all federally funded highways in the state would cost up to $4.3 billion (equivalent to $8.8 billion in 2024).

Plans for the Spaghetti Bowl were announced in 1996. It was needed to accommodate traffic for the 2002 Winter Olympics being held in the city. Most of the Spaghetti Bowl was open by November 2000; the remainder opened in early 2001.

In 2002, the Utah State Legislature named the highway the Purple Heart trail, in honor of wounded war veterans.

Additional reconstruction work—which involved the replacement of most of the bridges along the route and the resurfacing and installation of sound barriers—was done on I-80 between the Spaghetti Bowl and Parleys Canyon from 2007 to 2008.

== Exit list ==
County	Location	mi (Note: I-80 has its own mileposts and exits except for the concurrency with I-15, which uses the mileposts and exits from I-15.)	km	Exit	Destinations	Notes
Tooele	Wendover	0.000	0.000		I-80 west – Reno	Continuation into Nevada
Tooele	Wendover	0.043	0.069	1	Wendover	Westbound exit and eastbound entrance
Tooele	Wendover	1.484	2.388	2	I-80 BL / SR-58 west – Wendover	No westbound entrance; I-80 Bus. not signed eastbound
Tooele		3.000	4.828	3	Port of Entry	
Tooele		3.993	6.426	4	Bonneville Speedway	Rest and View Area off exit
Tooele		9.816	15.797	Rest Area		
Tooele		41.278	66.431	41	Knolls (Wendover Cut-off)	Eastern terminus of the Wendover Cut-off
Tooele		48.940	78.761	49	Clive	
Tooele		53.996	86.898	Grassy Mountain Rest Area		
Tooele		56.195	90.437	56	Aragonite	
Tooele		61.837	99.517	62	Military Area, Lakeside	
Tooele		69.521	111.883	70	Delle	
Tooele	Rowley Junction	76.402	122.957	77	SR-196 – Rowley, Dugway	
Tooele		83.358	134.152	84	SR-138 – Grantsville, Tooele	
Tooele		88.395	142.258	88	Grantsville	
Tooele		94.4	151.9	94	SR-179 south (Midvalley Highway)	New interchange opened on October 30, 2021
Tooele	Lake Point	98.619	158.712	99	SR-36 – Stansbury, Tooele	
Salt Lake		101.544	163.419	102	SR-201 east (2100 South) – Magna, West Valley City	Eastbound exit and westbound entrance
Salt Lake		104.273	167.811	104	SR-202 / Saltair Drive	Access to Great Salt Lake State Park
Salt Lake	Salt Lake City	111.287	179.099	111	7200 West	
Salt Lake	Salt Lake City	113.276	182.300	113	SR-172 south (5600 West)	
Salt Lake	Salt Lake City	114.336	184.006	114	Wright Brothers Drive	Westbound exit and eastbound entrance
Salt Lake	Salt Lake City	115.374	185.676	115	SR-154 (Bangerter Highway); Salt Lake City International Airport	Signed as exits 115A (SR-154) and 115B (airport)
Salt Lake	Salt Lake City	116.488	187.469	115C	North Temple – Downtown Salt Lake City, Temple Square	Eastbound exit and westbound entrance; former SR-186
Salt Lake	Salt Lake City	117.262	188.715	117	I-215 – Ogden, Provo	I-215 exit 22 northbound, 22A-B southbound
Salt Lake	Salt Lake City	117.862	189.681	118	SR-68 (Redwood Road)	
Salt Lake	Salt Lake City	119.591	192.463	120	I-15 north (Veteran's Memorial Highway) – Ogden	Eastbound exit and westbound entrance; I-15 exit 308
Salt Lake	Salt Lake City	119.591	192.463	121	SR-269 (600 South)	Eastbound exit and westbound entrance
Salt Lake	Salt Lake City	119.591	192.463	—	I-15 north (Veteran's Memorial Highway) – Ogden	West end of I-15 overlap; westbound left exit and eastbound left entrance; I-15 exit 308
Salt Lake	Salt Lake City			306	600 South	Westbound exit and eastbound entrance; exit numbers follow I-15
Salt Lake	Salt Lake City			305C	1300 South	Eastbound exit and westbound entrance; C/D lanes provide access to 2100 South/SR-201
Salt Lake	Salt Lake City			305B	2100 South	Eastbound exit accessible from C/D lanes
Salt Lake	Salt Lake City–South Salt Lake line			305A	SR-201 west – West Valley	Part of the Spaghetti Bowl interchange; eastbound exit and westbound entrance; accessible from C/D lanes eastbound; westbound entrance includes direct entrance ramp from 900 West and direct entrance ramp to 1300 South/900 South
Salt Lake	Salt Lake City–South Salt Lake line			—	I-15 south (Veteran's Memorial Highway) – Las Vegas	East end of I-15 overlap; eastbound left exit and westbound left entrance; I-15 exit 304
Salt Lake	Salt Lake City–South Salt Lake line			122	2100 South / 1300 South / 900 South	Westbound exit and eastbound entrance; part of the "Spaghetti Bowl" interchange; exit numbers follow I-80
Salt Lake	South Salt Lake	122.028	196.385	123A-B	I-15 south (Veteran's Memorial Highway) / SR-201 west – Las Vegas, West Valley	Westbound exit and eastbound entrance; signed as exits 123A (SR-201) and 123B (I-15) westbound; part of the "Spaghetti Bowl" interchange; I-15 exit 304
Salt Lake	South Salt Lake	123.231	198.321	124	US 89 (State Street)	
Salt Lake	Salt Lake City	124.125	199.760	125	SR-71 (700 East)	
Salt Lake	Salt Lake City	125.072	201.284	126	1300 East – Sugar House	Former SR-181
Salt Lake	Salt Lake City	126.785	204.041	127	2300 East – Holladay, Millcreek	Eastbound exit and westbound entrance; former SR-195
Salt Lake	Salt Lake City	127.039	204.449	128	I-215 south (Belt Route)	Eastbound exit and westbound entrance
Salt Lake	Millcreek	127.685	205.489	129	SR-186 west (Foothill Drive) / Parleys Way	Former US-40 Alternate
Salt Lake	Millcreek	128.619	206.992	130	I-215	Westbound exit and eastbound entrance; I-215 exit 2 northbound
Salt Lake		129.888	209.034	131	Quarry Service Road	No eastbound exit; signed as "Quarry"
Salt Lake		130.399	209.857	131	Rock Quarry Road	Signed as "Quarry"
Salt Lake		131.869	212.223	132	Mt. Aire Canyon Road	Signed as "Ranch Exit"
Salt Lake		132.477	213.201	133	Utility Exit	Eastbound exit and westbound entrance
Salt Lake		133.665	215.113	134	SR-65 north – East Canyon	
Salt Lake		136.113	219.053	137	Lambs Canyon	
Parleys Summit		139.413	224.363	140	Parleys Summit	Salt Lake–Summit county line
Summit	Summit Park	141.815	228.229	141	Jeremy Ranch	
Summit	Summit Park	142.847	229.890	View Area (eastbound); exit 144		
Summit	Kimball Junction	144.198	232.064	145	SR-224 south – Park City	
Summit	Silver Creek Junction	146.876	236.374	146	US 40 east (US-189 south) – Heber City, Vernal	West end of US-189 overlap; western terminus of US 40
Summit		150.724	242.567	150	Tollgate Promontory	
Summit	Wanship	154.972	249.403	155	SR-32 south – Wanship, Kamas	
Summit	Coalville	162.592	261.666	162	SR-280 – Coalville	
Summit		165.005	265.550	View Area		
Summit		167.324	269.282	168	I-84 west – Ogden	Eastern terminus of I-84; exits 120A-B on I-84
Summit		167.781	270.017	169	Echo	Access to California / Mormon Pioneer / Pony Express National Historic Trails
Summit		169.505	272.792	Rest Area		
Summit		178.703	287.595	178	Emory	Westbound exit and eastbound entrance
Summit		180	290	—	Port of Entry	Westbound exit and entrance
Summit		184.126	296.322	185	Castle Rock	
Summit		187.767	302.182	187	Fawcett	Formerly signed as "Ranch Exit"
Summit		191.690	308.495	191	Wahsatch	
Utah–Wyoming line		196.548– 196.680	316.313– 316.526	197	Port of Entry	Eastbound exit and entrance
Utah–Wyoming line		196.548– 196.680	316.313– 316.526		I-80 east / US 189 north – Cheyenne	Continuation into Wyoming
1.000 mi = 1.609 km; 1.000 km = 0.621 mi: Concurrency terminus; Incomplete access

== See also ==
- Interstate 80 Business (West Wendover, Nevada–Wendover, Utah)

== Notes ==
Interstate 80
Previous state: Nevada	Utah	Next state: Wyoming
