= Harper, Utah =

Ghost town in Carbon and Duchesne counties in Utah, United States

- Ghost town
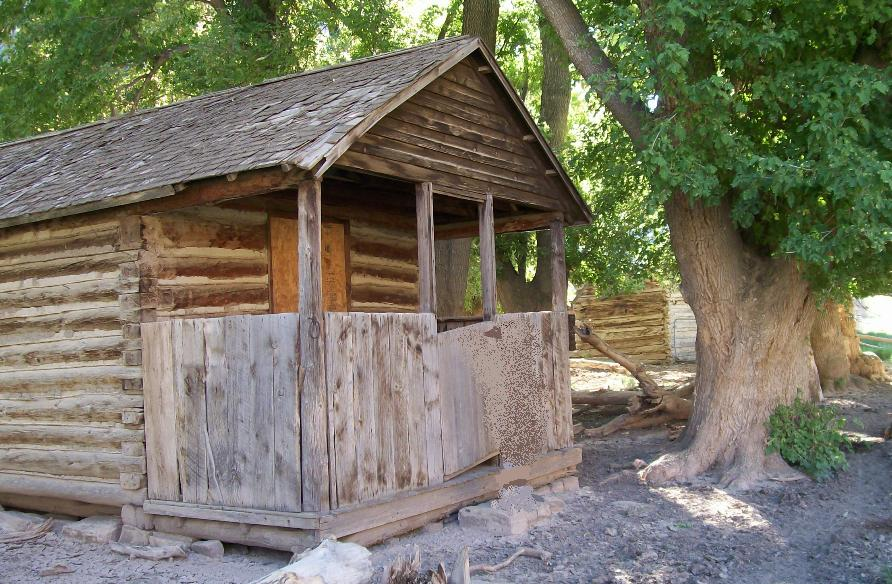
- Stagecoach stop in Harper

- Location within Utah Location within the United States
- Coordinates: 39°48′10″N 110°21′15″W
- Country: United States
- State: Utah
- County: Carbon & Duchesne
- Established: 1866
- Abandoned: 1930s

Harper is a ghost town located in Ninemile Canyon (at the mouth of Argyle Canyon) in Carbon and Duchesne counties in Utah, United States. This stagecoach town came into existence in 1886. The nearest inhabited town is Wellington. The remaining buildings are located mostly on private property and permission must be granted before accessing them.

== History ==
Alfred Lund came from Nephi in the spring of 1885 with his cattle and was the first homesteader in Argyle Canyon. Mr. Lund's first home, a log cabin, stands in ruins on the south side of the creek. Tom Taylor also homesteaded this ground before the Army built the road through to Fort Duchesne and the Uintah Basin in 1886.

In the 1890s, the government was freighting to Fort Duchesne over a road which passed through Nine Mile Canyon. This road is the lowest in elevation of any road between Price and the Uintah Basin. During the years 1888 to 1895 there were 600 soldiers at Fort Duchesne who hauled their supplies over this route. As nothing of any consequence was raised at the Post everything had to be shipped in: hay, grain, and other produce. Ed Lee purchased Taylor's homestead and it became known as "Lee Station", a stagecoach stop. A large barn housed the recuperating horses for the stage line and was noted for having a "real" sink. The army installed steel telegraph poles in the Canyon around 1886, that were American Civil War surplus. This telegraph line became the telephone line into the Basin in 1907 and remained until 1917. The poles have since served a local line until the 1990s.

According to government maps in the 1890s the name of the settlement is "Nine Mile", but some traditional accounts called it "Minnie-Maud", named for two girls who lived there. A creek that feeds Nine Mile Canyon is still called Minnie Maud. When the post office was established the town was named Harper. The greatest number of votes ever cast in the voting precinct was 72 in 1900.

Starting sometime before 1895, residents of Nine Mile Canyon struggled to keep a school district going. The first school house, built of logs by residents, sat in the mouth of Argyle Canyon. Until 1916 there were two schools, one in Carbon County and one in the Duchesne district. From 1916 to 1924, one school was maintained. This was closed for good in 1931 and moved to Wellington in the 1930s; it later burned.

Today, only a few structures remain, including the old stagecoach stop and some other log dwellings. The two-story Harper Hotel burned to the ground in the late 1980s or early 1990s; only the stone foundation remains now. Most of the town site is on private property, so permission is required to explore the area.

== See also ==
- List of ghost towns in Utah
