= National Register of Historic Places listings in Carbon County, Utah =

Location of Carbon County in Utah

This is a list of the National Register of Historic Places listings in Carbon County, Utah.

This is intended to be a complete list of the properties and districts on the National Register of Historic Places in Carbon County, Utah, United States. Latitude and longitude coordinates are provided for many National Register properties and districts; these locations may be seen together in a map.

There are 317 properties and districts listed on the National Register in the county, including 1 National Historic Landmark. Of these, almost 300 are archaeological sites in Nine Mile Canyon, and little is publicly made available about those sites beyond their names, almost all of which are given as Smithsonian trinomial codes. One other property in the county was once listed on the Register, but has since been removed.

This National Park Service list is complete through NPS recent listings posted October 2, 2026.

== Current listings ==
| | Name on the Register | Image | Date listed | Location | City or town | Description |
|---|---|---|---|---|---|---|
| 1 | 42Cb23 | | September 22, 2014 (#14000629) | Address Restricted | Wellington | Archaeological site in Nine Mile Canyon |
| 2 | 42Cb31 | | November 30, 2009 (#09001021) | Address Restricted | Wellington | Archaeological site in Nine Mile Canyon, including petroglyphs |
| 3 | 42Cb33 | | November 30, 2009 (#09000994) | Address Restricted | Wellington | Archaeological site in Nine Mile Canyon, including a granary |
| 4 | 42Cb34 | | September 22, 2014 (#14000630) | Address Restricted | Wellington | Archaeological site in Nine Mile Canyon |
| 5 | 42Cb36 | | November 30, 2009 (#09000999) | Address Restricted | Wellington | Archaeological site in Nine Mile Canyon, comprising a single-room residential structure with a Fremont granary and petroglyph |
| 6 | 42Cb44 | | September 22, 2014 (#14000632) | Address Restricted | Wellington | Archaeological site in Nine Mile Canyon |
| 7 | 42Cb46 | | November 30, 2009 (#09000998) | Address Restricted | Wellington | Archaeological site in Nine Mile Canyon, a rock shelter with a Fremont granary |
| 8 | 42Cb48 | | November 30, 2009 (#09000997) | Address Restricted | Wellington | Archaeological site in Nine Mile Canyon, comprising two granaries |
| 9 | 42Cb50 | | November 30, 2009 (#09000993) | Address Restricted | Wellington | Archaeological site in Nine Mile Canyon, including petroglyphs |
| 10 | 42Cb51 | | November 30, 2009 (#09001000) | Address Restricted | Wellington | Archaeological site in Nine Mile Canyon, a rock shelter with Fremont material |
| 11 | 42Cb52 | | November 30, 2009 (#09001020) | Address Restricted | Wellington | Archaeological site in Nine Mile Canyon, including petroglyphs |
| 12 | 42Cb78 | | September 22, 2014 (#14000633) | Address Restricted | Wellington | Archaeological site in Nine Mile Canyon |
| 13 | 42Cb143 | | September 22, 2014 (#14000634) | Address Restricted | Wellington | Archaeological site in Nine Mile Canyon |
| 14 | 42Cb0144 | | September 12, 2012 (#12000639) | Address Restricted | Wellington | Archaeological site in Nine Mile Canyon, including petroglyphs |
| 15 | 42Cb145 | | November 30, 2009 (#09001019) | Address Restricted | Wellington | Archaeological site in Nine Mile Canyon, including petroglyphs |
| 16 | 42Cb0146 | | September 12, 2012 (#12000612) | Address Restricted | Wellington | Archaeological site in Nine Mile Canyon, including petroglyphs |
| 17 | 42Cb0230 | | September 12, 2012 (#12000638) | Address Restricted | Wellington | Archaeological site in Nine Mile Canyon, including petroglyphs and pictographs |
| 18 | 42Cb0240 | | September 12, 2012 (#12000613) | Address Restricted | Wellington | Archaeological site in Nine Mile Canyon, a group of five rock art panels near the mouth of Cottonwood Canyon |
| 19 | 42Cb242 | | November 30, 2009 (#09000991) | Address Restricted | Wellington | Archaeological site in Nine Mile Canyon, including historic-era rock structures |
| 20 | 42Cb259 | | September 22, 2014 (#14000636) | Address Restricted | Wellington | Archaeological site in Nine Mile Canyon |
| 21 | 42Cb261 | | September 22, 2014 (#14000638) | Address Restricted | Wellington | Archaeological site in Nine Mile Canyon |
| 22 | 42C262 | | September 22, 2014 (#14000639) | Address Restricted | Wellington | Archaeological site in Nine Mile Canyon |
| 23 | 42Cb0264 | | September 12, 2012 (#12000614) | Address Restricted | Wellington | Archaeological site in Nine Mile Canyon, a rock shelter with petroglyphs |
| 24 | 42Cb404 | | September 22, 2014 (#14000640) | Address Restricted | Wellington | Archaeological site in Nine Mile Canyon |
| 25 | 42Cb0593 | | September 12, 2012 (#12000615) | Address Restricted | Wellington | Archaeological site in Nine Mile Canyon, a single-room structure with petroglyphs |
| 26 | 42Cb0594 | | September 12, 2012 (#12000616) | Address Restricted | Wellington | Archaeological site in Nine Mile Canyon, including petroglyphs and historic inscriptions associated with Nine Mile Road |
| 27 | 42Cb627 | | September 22, 2014 (#14000641) | Address Restricted | Wellington | Archaeological site in Nine Mile Canyon |
| 28 | 42Cb0628 | | September 12, 2012 (#12000617) | Address Restricted | Wellington | Archaeological site in Nine Mile Canyon, including petroglyphs |
| 29 | 42Cb0629 | | September 12, 2012 (#12000619) | Address Restricted | Wellington | Archaeological site in Nine Mile Canyon, including petroglyphs |
| 30 | 42Cb0630 | | September 12, 2012 (#12000620) | Address Restricted | Wellington | Archaeological site in Nine Mile Canyon, including pictographs |
| 31 | 42Cb0632 | | September 12, 2012 (#12000621) | Address Restricted | Wellington | Archaeological site in Nine Mile Canyon, including petroglyphs |
| 32 | 42Cb0637 | | September 12, 2012 (#12000637) | Address Restricted | Wellington | Archaeological site in Nine Mile Canyon, a single-family dwelling with a stone circle and storage cist |
| 33 | 42Cb0641 | | September 12, 2012 (#12000622) | Address Restricted | Wellington | Archaeological site in Nine Mile Canyon, including petroglyphs |
| 34 | 42Cb0668 | | September 12, 2012 (#12000618) | Address Restricted | Wellington | Archaeological site in Nine Mile Canyon, a one-room residential structure |
| 35 | 42Cb675 | | September 22, 2014 (#14000642) | Address Restricted | Wellington | Archaeological site in Nine Mile Canyon |
| 36 | 42Cb0676 | | September 12, 2012 (#12000623) | Address Restricted | Wellington | Archaeological site in Nine Mile Canyon, including petroglyphs and historic inscriptions associated with Nine Mile Road |
| 37 | 42Cb0678 | | September 12, 2012 (#12000624) | Address Restricted | Wellington | Archaeological site in Nine Mile Canyon, including petroglyphs |
| 38 | 42Cb0680 | | September 12, 2012 (#12000636) | Address Restricted | Wellington | Archaeological site in Nine Mile Canyon, including petroglyphs |
| 39 | 42Cb690 | | November 30, 2009 (#09001002) | Address Restricted | Wellington | Archaeological site in Nine Mile Canyon, including a granary |
| 40 | 42Cb0693 | | September 12, 2012 (#12000625) | Address Restricted | Wellington | Archaeological site in Nine Mile Canyon, including petroglyphs |
| 41 | 42Cb0695 | | September 12, 2012 (#12000626) | Address Restricted | Wellington | Archaeological site in Nine Mile Canyon, including petroglyphs |
| 42 | 42Cb0696 | | September 12, 2012 (#12000627) | Address Restricted | Wellington | Archaeological site in Nine Mile Canyon, including a depression, petroglyphs, and historic inscriptions associated with Nine Mile Road |
| 43 | 42Cb697 | | November 30, 2009 (#09001003) | Address Restricted | Wellington | Archaeological site in Nine Mile Canyon, including a granary |
| 44 | 42Cb0698 | | September 12, 2012 (#12000628) | Address Restricted | Wellington | Archaeological site in Nine Mile Canyon, including a depression, petroglyphs, and artifacts |
| 45 | 42Cb0700 | | September 12, 2012 (#12000635) | Address Restricted | Wellington | Archaeological site in Nine Mile Canyon, including petroglyphs |
| 46 | 42Cb0701 | | September 12, 2012 (#12000629) | Address Restricted | Wellington | Archaeological site in Nine Mile Canyon, a rock shelter with petroglyphs |
| 47 | 42Cb0702 | | September 12, 2012 (#12000630) | Address Restricted | Wellington | Archaeological site in Nine Mile Canyon, including petroglyphs |
| 48 | 42Cb0703 | | September 12, 2012 (#12000631) | Address Restricted | Wellington | Archaeological site in Nine Mile Canyon, including petroglyphs |
| 49 | 42Cb0704 | | September 12, 2012 (#12000632) | Address Restricted | Wellington | Archaeological site in Nine Mile Canyon, including petroglyphs |
| 50 | 42Cb0705 | | September 12, 2012 (#12000633) | Address Restricted | Wellington | Archaeological site in Nine Mile Canyon, including petroglyphs |
| 51 | 42Cb0707 | | September 12, 2012 (#12000634) | Address Restricted | Wellington | Archaeological site in Nine Mile Canyon, including petroglyphs |
| 52 | 42Cb0708 | | September 12, 2012 (#12000640) | Address Restricted | Wellington | Archaeological site in Nine Mile Canyon, including petroglyphs |
| 53 | 42Cb0709 | | September 12, 2012 (#12000641) | Address Restricted | Wellington | Archaeological site in Nine Mile Canyon, including petroglyphs |
| 54 | 42Cb710 | | September 22, 2014 (#14000643) | Address Restricted | Wellington | Archaeological site in Nine Mile Canyon |
| 55 | 42Cb0712 | | September 12, 2012 (#12000642) | Address Restricted | Wellington | Archaeological site in Nine Mile Canyon, including a depression and Fremont petroglyphs |
| 56 | 42Cb0713 | | September 12, 2012 (#12000643) | Address Restricted | Wellington | Archaeological site in Nine Mile Canyon, including pictographs |
| 57 | 42Cb0714 | | September 12, 2012 (#12000644) | Address Restricted | Wellington | Archaeological site in Nine Mile Canyon, including petroglyphs |
| 58 | 42Cb0715 | | September 12, 2012 (#12000645) | Address Restricted | Wellington | Archaeological site in Nine Mile Canyon |
| 59 | 42Cb716 | | September 22, 2014 (#14000644) | Address Restricted | Wellington | Archaeological site in Nine Mile Canyon |
| 60 | 42Cb717 | | September 22, 2014 (#14000645) | Address Restricted | Wellington | Archaeological site in Nine Mile Canyon |
| 61 | 42Cb0718 | | September 12, 2012 (#12000646) | Address Restricted | Wellington | Archaeological site in Nine Mile Canyon, including petroglyphs |
| 62 | 42Cb719 | | September 22, 2014 (#14000646) | Address Restricted | Wellington | Archaeological site in Nine Mile Canyon |
| 63 | 42Cb720 | | September 22, 2014 (#14000647) | Address Restricted | Wellington | Archaeological site in Nine Mile Canyon |
| 64 | 42Cb721 | | September 22, 2014 (#14000648) | Address Restricted | Wellington | Archaeological site in Nine Mile Canyon |
| 65 | 42Cb722 | | September 22, 2014 (#14000649) | Address Restricted | Wellington | Archaeological site in Nine Mile Canyon |
| 66 | 42Cb727 | | September 22, 2014 (#14000650) | Address Restricted | Wellington | Archaeological site in Nine Mile Canyon |
| 67 | 42Cb728 | | September 22, 2014 (#14000651) | Address Restricted | Wellington | Archaeological site in Nine Mile Canyon |
| 68 | 42Cb729 | | November 30, 2009 (#09001005) | Address Restricted | Wellington | Archaeological site in Nine Mile Canyon, a masonry granary, crushed by a rock fall, that contained two wooden shovels. About 650 m above the canyon floor. |
| 69 | 42Cb730 | | November 30, 2009 (#09001011) | Address Restricted | Wellington | Archaeological site in Nine Mile Canyon, a single pit-house that yielded ceramic and stone artifacts |
| 70 | 42Cb731 | | November 30, 2009 (#09001004) | Address Restricted | Wellington | Archaeological site in Nine Mile Canyon, a stone and adobe granary that contained two digging sticks |
| 71 | 42Cb732 | | September 22, 2014 (#14000652) | Address Restricted | Wellington | Archaeological site in Nine Mile Canyon |
| 72 | 42Cb0734 | | September 12, 2012 (#12000647) | Address Restricted | Wellington | Archaeological site in Nine Mile Canyon, a one-room structure with pictographs |
| 73 | 42Cb0735 | | September 12, 2012 (#12000648) | Address Restricted | Wellington | Archaeological site in Nine Mile Canyon, including petroglyphs |
| 74 | 42Cb736 | | November 30, 2009 (#09001008) | Address Restricted | Wellington | Archaeological site in Nine Mile Canyon |
| 75 | 42Cb0742 | | September 12, 2012 (#12000649) | Address Restricted | Wellington | Archaeological site in Nine Mile Canyon, including a granary with petroglyphs and pictographs |
| 76 | 42Cb743 | | November 30, 2009 (#09001007) | Address Restricted | Wellington | Archaeological site in Nine Mile Canyon, including a cist, petroglyphs, and pictographs |
| 77 | 42Cb744 | | November 30, 2009 (#09001018) | Address Restricted | Wellington | Archaeological site in Nine Mile Canyon, including petroglyphs |
| 78 | 42Cb745 | | November 30, 2009 (#09001017) | Address Restricted | Wellington | Archaeological site in Nine Mile Canyon, including a cist and a petroglyph panel with a depiction of two adult Bighorn Sheep nose-to-nose |
| 79 | 42Cb746 | | November 30, 2009 (#09000996) | Address Restricted | Wellington | Archaeological site in Nine Mile Canyon, including petroglyphs |
| 80 | 42Cb0747 | | September 12, 2012 (#12000650) | Address Restricted | Wellington | Archaeological site in Nine Mile Canyon, including petroglyphs |
| 81 | 42Cb0749 | | September 12, 2012 (#12000651) | Address Restricted | Wellington | Archaeological site in Nine Mile Canyon, a one-room rock shelter structure |
| 82 | 42Cb0750 | | September 12, 2012 (#12000652) | Address Restricted | Wellington | Archaeological site in Nine Mile Canyon, including petroglyphs |
| 83 | 42Cb0751 | | September 12, 2012 (#12000653) | Address Restricted | Wellington | Archaeological site in Nine Mile Canyon, including a cist |
| 84 | 42Cb0752 | | September 12, 2012 (#12000654) | Address Restricted | Wellington | Archaeological site in Nine Mile Canyon, including pictographs |
| 85 | 42Cb0753 | | September 12, 2012 (#12000655) | Address Restricted | Wellington | Archaeological site in Nine Mile Canyon, including petroglyphs |
| 86 | 42Cb0754 | | September 12, 2012 (#12000656) | Address Restricted | Wellington | Archaeological site in Nine Mile Canyon, including pictographs |
| 87 | 42Cb0755 | | September 12, 2012 (#12000657) | Address Restricted | Wellington | Archaeological site in Nine Mile Canyon, including petroglyphs |
| 88 | 42Cb0756 | | September 12, 2012 (#12000658) | Address Restricted | Wellington | Archaeological site in Nine Mile Canyon, including petroglyphs and pictographs |
| 89 | 42Cb0757 | | September 12, 2012 (#12000659) | Address Restricted | Wellington | Archaeological site in Nine Mile Canyon, including a rock shelter with a rock alignment, petroglyphs, and stone artifacts |
| 90 | 42Cb0758 | | September 12, 2012 (#12000660) | Address Restricted | Wellington | Archaeological site in Nine Mile Canyon, including petroglyphs |
| 91 | 42Cb0759 | | September 12, 2012 (#12000661) | Address Restricted | Wellington | Archaeological site in Nine Mile Canyon, including petroglyphs and stone artifacts |
| 92 | 42Cb0760 | | September 12, 2012 (#12000662) | Address Restricted | Wellington | Archaeological site in Nine Mile Canyon, including petroglyphs |
| 93 | 42Cb0761 | | September 12, 2012 (#12000663) | Address Restricted | Wellington | Archaeological site in Nine Mile Canyon, a rock shelter residence with a rubble mound |
| 94 | 42Cb0766 | | September 12, 2012 (#12000666) | Address Restricted | Wellington | Archaeological site in Nine Mile Canyon, including petroglyphs |
| 95 | 42Cb0767 | | September 12, 2012 (#12000664) | Address Restricted | Wellington | Archaeological site in Nine Mile Canyon, including petroglyphs |
| 96 | 42Cb0769 | | September 12, 2012 (#12000665) | Address Restricted | Wellington | Archaeological site in Nine Mile Canyon, a granary with petroglyphs and pictographs |
| 97 | 42Cb0771 | | September 12, 2012 (#12000667) | Address Restricted | Wellington | Archaeological site in Nine Mile Canyon, a rock shelter with a rock alignment, wall, and Fremont ceramics |
| 98 | 42Cb0775 | | September 12, 2012 (#12000668) | Address Restricted | Wellington | Archaeological site in Nine Mile Canyon, including a wall |
| 99 | 42Cb0776 | | September 12, 2012 (#12000669) | Address Restricted | Wellington | Archaeological site in Nine Mile Canyon, a slabstone and masonry structure in a narrow crevice in a cliff face 15 m above the floor of South Franks Canyon, very hard to get to. Includes a granary, organic material dated to A.D. 1293, a few potsherds, and a row of red pictographs |
| 100 | 42Cb0777 | | September 12, 2012 (#12000670) | Address Restricted | Wellington | Archaeological site in Nine Mile Canyon, including a granary |
| 101 | 42Cb0778 | | September 12, 2012 (#12000671) | Address Restricted | Wellington | Archaeological site in Nine Mile Canyon, a one-room structure and wall |
| 102 | 42Cb0779 | | September 12, 2012 (#12000672) | Address Restricted | Wellington | Archaeological site in Nine Mile Canyon, including a Ute storage cist |
| 103 | 42Cb0780 | | September 12, 2012 (#12000673) | Address Restricted | Wellington | Archaeological site in Nine Mile Canyon, a historic-era survey cairn on a cliff ledge |
| 104 | 42Cb0781 | | September 12, 2012 (#12000674) | Address Restricted | Wellington | Archaeological site in Nine Mile Canyon, a collapsed historic-era survey cairn on a cliff ledge |
| 105 | 42Cb0783 | | September 12, 2012 (#12000675) | Address Restricted | Wellington | Archaeological site in Nine Mile Canyon, including petroglyphs |
| 106 | 42Cb0787 | | September 12, 2012 (#12000676) | Address Restricted | Wellington | Archaeological site in Nine Mile Canyon, including petroglyphs and pictographs |
| 107 | 42Cb0788 | | September 12, 2012 (#12000677) | Address Restricted | Wellington | Archaeological site in Nine Mile Canyon, including petroglyphs |
| 108 | 42Cb0790 | | September 12, 2012 (#12000678) | Address Restricted | Wellington | Archaeological site in Nine Mile Canyon, including petroglyphs |
| 109 | 42Cb0791 | | September 12, 2012 (#12000679) | Address Restricted | Wellington | Archaeological site in Nine Mile Canyon, including petroglyphs and three cists |
| 110 | 42Cb0792 | | September 12, 2012 (#12000680) | Address Restricted | Wellington | Archaeological site in Nine Mile Canyon, including petroglyphs |
| 111 | 42Cb0794 | | September 12, 2012 (#12000681) | Address Restricted | Wellington | Archaeological site in Nine Mile Canyon, including petroglyphs |
| 112 | 42Cb0802 | | September 12, 2012 (#12000682) | Address Restricted | Wellington | Archaeological site in Nine Mile Canyon, has yielded some ceramics |
| 113 | 42Cb0803 | | September 12, 2012 (#12000683) | Address Restricted | Wellington | Archaeological site in Nine Mile Canyon |
| 114 | 42Cb804 | | November 30, 2009 (#09001006) | Address Restricted | Wellington | Archaeological site in Nine Mile Canyon, a rock shelter with rock alignment and petroglyphs |
| 115 | 42Cb805 | | September 22, 2014 (#14000654) | Address Restricted | Wellington | Archaeological site in Nine Mile Canyon |
| 116 | 42Cb0806 | | September 12, 2012 (#12000684) | Address Restricted | Wellington | Archaeological site in Nine Mile Canyon, a Fremont site with petroglyphs, ceramic and stone artifacts |
| 117 | 42Cb0807 | | September 12, 2012 (#12000685) | Address Restricted | Wellington | Archaeological site in Nine Mile Canyon, including petroglyphs |
| 118 | 42Cb0808 | | September 12, 2012 (#12000686) | Address Restricted | Wellington | Archaeological site in Nine Mile Canyon, including petroglyphs |
| 119 | 42Cb809 | | November 30, 2009 (#09000995) | Address Restricted | Wellington | Archaeological site in Nine Mile Canyon, including petroglyphs |
| 120 | 42Cb0810 | | September 12, 2012 (#12000687) | Address Restricted | Wellington | Archaeological site in Nine Mile Canyon, including petroglyphs |
| 121 | 42Cb811 | | November 30, 2009 (#09001010) | Address Restricted | Wellington | Archaeological site in Nine Mile Canyon, a Fremont site with petroglyphs, ceramic and stone artifacts |
| 122 | 42Cb0812 | | September 12, 2012 (#12000688) | Address Restricted | Wellington | Archaeological site in Nine Mile Canyon, including petroglyphs |
| 123 | 42Cb0813 | | September 12, 2012 (#12000689) | Address Restricted | Wellington | Archaeological site in Nine Mile Canyon, including petroglyphs |
| 124 | 42Cb0814 | | September 12, 2012 (#12000690) | Address Restricted | Wellington | Archaeological site in Nine Mile Canyon, including petroglyphs |
| 125 | 42Cb815 | | September 22, 2014 (#14000655) | Address Restricted | Wellington | Archaeological site in Nine Mile Canyon |
| 126 | 42Cb0825 | | September 12, 2012 (#12000691) | Address Restricted | Wellington | Archaeological site in Nine Mile Canyon, including petroglyphs and historic inscriptions associated with Nine Mile Road |
| 127 | 42Cb0829 | | September 12, 2012 (#12000692) | Address Restricted | Wellington | Archaeological site in Nine Mile Canyon, including petroglyphs and pictographs |
| 128 | 42Cb0831 | | September 12, 2012 (#12000693) | Address Restricted | Wellington | Archaeological site in Nine Mile Canyon, including petroglyphs |
| 129 | 42Cb0832 | | September 12, 2012 (#12000695) | Address Restricted | Wellington | Archaeological site in Nine Mile Canyon, including petroglyphs |
| 130 | 42Cb0834 | | September 12, 2012 (#12000694) | Address Restricted | Wellington | Archaeological site in Nine Mile Canyon, including petroglyphs |
| 131 | 42Cb839 | | September 22, 2014 (#14000656) | Address Restricted | Wellington | Archaeological site in Nine Mile Canyon |
| 132 | 42Cb851 | | November 30, 2009 (#09000986) | Address Restricted | Wellington | Archaeological site in Nine Mile Canyon, including petroglyphs |
| 133 | 42Cb852 | | September 22, 2014 (#14000657) | Address Restricted | Wellington | Archaeological site in Nine Mile Canyon |
| 134 | 42Cb853 | | September 22, 2014 (#14000658) | Address Restricted | Wellington | Archaeological site in Nine Mile Canyon |
| 135 | 42Cb857 | | September 22, 2014 (#14000659) | Address Restricted | Wellington | Archaeological site in Nine Mile Canyon |
| 136 | 42Cb858 | | September 22, 2014 (#14000660) | Address Restricted | Wellington | Archaeological site in Nine Mile Canyon |
| 137 | 42Cb0859 | | September 12, 2012 (#12000696) | Address Restricted | Wellington | Archaeological site in Nine Mile Canyon, including petroglyphs |
| 138 | 42Cb861 | | September 22, 2014 (#14000667) | Address Restricted | Wellington | Archaeological site in Nine Mile Canyon |
| 139 | 42Cb0863 | | September 12, 2012 (#12000697) | Address Restricted | Wellington | Archaeological site in Nine Mile Canyon, including petroglyphs |
| 140 | 42Cb864 | | September 22, 2014 (#14000670) | Address Restricted | Wellington | Archaeological site in Nine Mile Canyon |
| 141 | 42Cb0866 | | September 12, 2012 (#12000698) | Address Restricted | Wellington | Archaeological site in Nine Mile Canyon, including a prehistoric cairn with rock alignment |
| 142 | 42Cb0867 | | September 12, 2012 (#12000699) | Address Restricted | Wellington | Archaeological site in Nine Mile Canyon, including a granary |
| 143 | 42Cb0868 | | September 12, 2012 (#12000700) | Address Restricted | Wellington | Archaeological site in Nine Mile Canyon, including petroglyphs |
| 144 | 42Cb0869 | | September 12, 2012 (#12000701) | Address Restricted | Wellington | Archaeological site in Nine Mile Canyon, including a rock alignment |
| 145 | 42Cb0870 | | September 12, 2012 (#12000702) | Address Restricted | Wellington | Archaeological site in Nine Mile Canyon, a group of six rock art panels in Cottonwood Canyon, with petroglyphs and red and white pictographs, and a rock wall |
| 146 | 42Cb0872 | | September 12, 2012 (#12000703) | Address Restricted | Wellington | Archaeological site in Nine Mile Canyon, a small, very eroded pictograph panel in a rock shelter in Cottonwood Canyon |
| 147 | 42Cb0875 | | September 12, 2012 (#12000706) | Address Restricted | Wellington | Archaeological site in Nine Mile Canyon, a one-room structure |
| 148 | 42Cb0877 | | September 12, 2012 (#12000704) | Address Restricted | Wellington | Archaeological site in Nine Mile Canyon, including petroglyphs, pictographs, and stone artifacts |
| 149 | 42Cb0880 | | September 12, 2012 (#12000707) | Address Restricted | Wellington | Archaeological site in Nine Mile Canyon, including petroglyphs |
| 150 | 42Cb0881 | | September 12, 2012 (#12000708) | Address Restricted | Wellington | Archaeological site in Nine Mile Canyon, including petroglyphs |
| 151 | 42Cb0882 | | September 12, 2012 (#12000709) | Address Restricted | Wellington | Archaeological site in Nine Mile Canyon, including a cist, petroglyphs, and ceramics |
| 152 | 42Cb0883 | | September 12, 2012 (#12000710) | Address Restricted | Wellington | Archaeological site in Nine Mile Canyon, including petroglyphs and pictographs |
| 153 | 42Cb0884 | | September 12, 2012 (#12000711) | Address Restricted | Wellington | Archaeological site in Nine Mile Canyon, including petroglyphs |
| 154 | 42Cb0885 | | September 12, 2012 (#12000712) | Address Restricted | Wellington | Archaeological site in Nine Mile Canyon, including pictographs |
| 155 | 42Cb0886 | | September 12, 2012 (#12000713) | Address Restricted | Wellington | Archaeological site in Nine Mile Canyon, including petroglyphs and pictographs |
| 156 | 42Cb887 | | September 22, 2014 (#14000671) | Address Restricted | Wellington | Archaeological site in Nine Mile Canyon |
| 157 | 42Cb0888 | | September 12, 2012 (#12000714) | Address Restricted | Wellington | Archaeological site in Nine Mile Canyon, including pictographs |
| 158 | 42Cb0889 | | September 12, 2012 (#12000715) | Address Restricted | Wellington | Archaeological site in Nine Mile Canyon, a rock shelter with a depression, wall, and petroglyphs |
| 159 | 42Cb0890 | | September 12, 2012 (#12000716) | Address Restricted | Wellington | Archaeological site in Nine Mile Canyon that has yielded stone artifacts |
| 160 | 42Cb0891 | | September 12, 2012 (#12000717) | Address Restricted | Wellington | Archaeological site in Nine Mile Canyon, comprising a single pit-house with a wall, rock alignment, petroglyphs, and ceramics |
| 161 | 42Cb0892 | | September 12, 2012 (#12000718) | Address Restricted | Wellington | Archaeological site in Nine Mile Canyon, including petroglyphs |
| 162 | 42Cb893 | | November 30, 2009 (#09001009) | Address Restricted | Wellington | Archaeological site in Nine Mile Canyon, including a cist |
| 163 | 42Cb0894 | | September 12, 2012 (#12000719) | Address Restricted | Wellington | Archaeological site in Nine Mile Canyon, including petroglyphs and historic inscriptions associated with Nine Mile Road |
| 164 | 42Cb0895 | | September 12, 2012 (#12000720) | Address Restricted | Wellington | Archaeological site in Nine Mile Canyon, including petroglyphs |
| 165 | 42Cb0896 | | September 12, 2012 (#12000721) | Address Restricted | Wellington | Archaeological site in Nine Mile Canyon, including pictographs |
| 166 | 42Cb0898 | | September 12, 2012 (#12000722) | Address Restricted | Wellington | Archaeological site in Nine Mile Canyon, including petroglyphs, pictographs, and historic inscriptions associated with Nine Mile Road |
| 167 | 42Cb0899 | | September 12, 2012 (#12000723) | Address Restricted | Wellington | Archaeological site in Nine Mile Canyon, including historic inscriptions associated with Nine Mile Road |
| 168 | 42Cb0900 | | September 12, 2012 (#12000724) | Address Restricted | Wellington | Archaeological site in Nine Mile Canyon, including petroglyphs |
| 169 | 42Cb905 | | September 22, 2014 (#14000672) | Address Restricted | Wellington | Archaeological site in Nine Mile Canyon |
| 170 | 42Cb0911 | | September 12, 2012 (#12000725) | Address Restricted | Wellington | Archaeological site in Nine Mile Canyon, including petroglyphs |
| 171 | 42Cb0912 | | September 12, 2012 (#12000726) | Address Restricted | Wellington | Archaeological site in Nine Mile Canyon, including petroglyphs |
| 172 | 42Cb0919 | | September 12, 2012 (#12000727) | Address Restricted | Wellington | Archaeological site in Nine Mile Canyon, including a cist, petroglyphs, and ceramics |
| 173 | 42Cb0920 | | September 12, 2012 (#12000728) | Address Restricted | Wellington | Archaeological site in Nine Mile Canyon, including petroglyphs and pictographs |
| 174 | 42Cb0921 | | September 12, 2012 (#12000729) | Address Restricted | Wellington | Archaeological site in Nine Mile Canyon, including a rock alignment |
| 175 | 42Cb0922 | | September 12, 2012 (#12000730) | Address Restricted | Wellington | Archaeological site in Nine Mile Canyon, including petroglyphs |
| 176 | 42Cb0923 | | September 12, 2012 (#12000731) | Address Restricted | Wellington | Archaeological site in Nine Mile Canyon, including a granary |
| 177 | 42Cb0924 | | September 12, 2012 (#12000732) | Address Restricted | Wellington | Archaeological site in Nine Mile Canyon, including petroglyphs and pictographs |
| 178 | 42Cb0955 | | September 12, 2012 (#12000733) | Address Restricted | Wellington | Archaeological site in Nine Mile Canyon, a single petroglyph panel in Cottonwood Canyon, showing two bighorn sheep and a third figure |
| 179 | 42Cb0956 | | September 12, 2012 (#12000734) | Address Restricted | Wellington | Archaeological site in Nine Mile Canyon, with scattered artifacts and remnants of a stone and adobe wall in Cottonwood Canyon |
| 180 | 42Cb969 | | November 30, 2009 (#09000985) | Address Restricted | Wellington | Archaeological site in Nine Mile Canyon, a petroglyph panel in Cottonwood Canyon depicting three quadrupeds with antlers |
| 181 | 42Cb0970 | | September 12, 2012 (#12000735) | Address Restricted | Wellington | Archaeological site in Nine Mile Canyon, two nearly inaccessible petroglyph panels in Cottonwood Canyon |
| 182 | 42Cb0971 | | September 12, 2012 (#12000736) | Address Restricted | Wellington | Archaeological site in Nine Mile Canyon, a masonry wall and large amounts of burned stone in Cottonwood Canyon |
| 183 | 42Cb0972 | | September 12, 2012 (#12000737) | Address Restricted | Wellington | Archaeological site in Nine Mile Canyon, including a rock alignment |
| 184 | 42Cb0973 | | September 12, 2012 (#12000738) | Address Restricted | Wellington | Archaeological site in Nine Mile Canyon, two rock alignments in Cottonwood Canyon with a dense concentration of artifacts |
| 185 | 42Cb974 | 42Cb974 | November 30, 2009 (#09000987) | Address Restricted | Wellington | Archaeological site in Nine Mile Canyon, a tall rock art panel in Cottonwood Canyon with petroglyphs and pictographs from several prehistoric and historic periods, known as the "Pregnant Buffalo" |
| 186 | 42Cb0975 | | September 12, 2012 (#12000739) | Address Restricted | Wellington | Archaeological site in Nine Mile Canyon, a single large panel of 40 to 50 petroglyphs in Cottonwood Canyon |
| 187 | 42Cb0976 | | September 12, 2012 (#12000740) | Address Restricted | Wellington | Archaeological site in Nine Mile Canyon, a single small petroglyph panel on a boulder in Cottonwood Canyon |
| 188 | 42Cb0977 | | September 12, 2012 (#12000741) | Address Restricted | Wellington | Archaeological site in Nine Mile Canyon, including a cist |
| 189 | 42Cb0981 | | September 12, 2012 (#12000742) | Address Restricted | Wellington | Archaeological site in Nine Mile Canyon, a single petroglyph panel in Cottonwood Canyon, including a prominent bullseye pattern |
| 190 | 42Cb0982 | | September 12, 2012 (#12000743) | Address Restricted | Wellington | Archaeological site in Nine Mile Canyon, a single rock art panel in Cottonwood Canyon, including a red and white semicircle pictograph |
| 191 | 42Cb0983 | | September 12, 2012 (#12000744) | Address Restricted | Wellington | Archaeological site in Nine Mile Canyon, including pictographs |
| 192 | 42Cb0984 | | September 12, 2012 (#12000745) | Address Restricted | Wellington | Archaeological site in Nine Mile Canyon, including petroglyphs |
| 193 | 42Cb0985 | | September 12, 2012 (#12000746) | Address Restricted | Wellington | Archaeological site in Nine Mile Canyon, a group of five rock art panels adjacent to the "Pregnant Buffalo" site in Cottonwood Canyon |
| 194 | 42Cb0986 | | September 12, 2012 (#12000747) | Address Restricted | Wellington | Archaeological site in Nine Mile Canyon, two rock art panels in Cottonwood Canyon |
| 195 | 42Cb0994 | | September 12, 2012 (#12000748) | Address Restricted | Wellington | Archaeological site in Nine Mile Canyon, a small petroglyph panel at the base of a cliff in Cottonwood Canyon |
| 196 | 42Cb996 | | September 22, 2014 (#14000674) | Address Restricted | Wellington | Archaeological site in Nine Mile Canyon |
| 197 | 42Cb1045 | | September 12, 2012 (#12000749) | Address Restricted | Wellington | Archaeological site in Nine Mile Canyon, including two panels of petroglyphs in the "Dinwoody Tradition" |
| 198 | 42Cb1046 | | September 12, 2012 (#12000750) | Address Restricted | Wellington | Archaeological site in Nine Mile Canyon, including petroglyphs |
| 199 | 42Cb1047 | | September 12, 2012 (#12000751) | Address Restricted | Wellington | Archaeological site in Nine Mile Canyon, including petroglyphs |
| 200 | 42Cb1048 | | September 12, 2012 (#12000752) | Address Restricted | Wellington | Archaeological site in Nine Mile Canyon, including a rock alignment |
| 201 | 42Cb1049 | | September 12, 2012 (#12000753) | Address Restricted | Wellington | Archaeological site in Nine Mile Canyon, a one-room structure with stone artifacts |
| 202 | 42Cb1050 | | September 12, 2012 (#12000754) | Address Restricted | Wellington | Archaeological site in Nine Mile Canyon, a multi-room structure with petroglyphs |
| 203 | 42Cb1051 | | September 12, 2012 (#12000755) | Address Restricted | Wellington | Archaeological site in Nine Mile Canyon, including a granary |
| 204 | 42Cb1252 | | November 30, 2009 (#09000988) | Address Restricted | Wellington | Archaeological site in Nine Mile Canyon, consisting of a single pictograph on the underside of a rock overhang |
| 205 | 42Cb1378 | | September 22, 2014 (#14000675) | Address Restricted | Wellington | Archaeological site in Nine Mile Canyon |
| 206 | 42Cb1379 | | September 12, 2012 (#12000756) | Address Restricted | Wellington | Archaeological site in Nine Mile Canyon, including petroglyphs and pictographs |
| 207 | 42Cb1466 | | September 12, 2012 (#12000757) | Address Restricted | Wellington | Archaeological site in Nine Mile Canyon, a one-room structure |
| 208 | 42Cb1711 | | September 22, 2014 (#14000676) | Address Restricted | Wellington | Archaeological site in Nine Mile Canyon |
| 209 | 42Cb1716 | | September 22, 2014 (#14000677) | Address Restricted | Wellington | Archaeological site in Nine Mile Canyon |
| 210 | 42Cb1727 | | September 22, 2014 (#14000678) | Address Restricted | Wellington | Archaeological site in Nine Mile Canyon |
| 211 | 42Cb1735 | | September 22, 2014 (#14000680) | Address Restricted | Wellington | Archaeological site in Nine Mile Canyon |
| 212 | 42Cb1736 | | September 22, 2014 (#14000681) | Address Restricted | Wellington | Archaeological site in Nine Mile Canyon |
| 213 | 42Cb1738 | | September 22, 2014 (#14000682) | Address Restricted | Wellington | Archaeological site in Nine Mile Canyon |
| 214 | 42Cb1740 | | September 22, 2014 (#14000683) | Address Restricted | Wellington | Archaeological site in Nine Mile Canyon |
| 215 | 42Cb1744 | | September 22, 2014 (#14000684) | Address Restricted | Wellington | Archaeological site in Nine Mile Canyon |
| 216 | 42Cb1748 | | September 22, 2014 (#14000685) | Address Restricted | Wellington | Archaeological site in Nine Mile Canyon |
| 217 | 42Cb1749 | | September 22, 2014 (#14000686) | Address Restricted | Wellington | Archaeological site in Nine Mile Canyon |
| 218 | 42Cb1750 | | September 22, 2014 (#14000687) | Address Restricted | Wellington | Archaeological site in Nine Mile Canyon |
| 219 | 42Cb1750 | | September 22, 2014 (#14000688) | Address Restricted | Wellington | Archaeological site in Nine Mile Canyon |
| 220 | 42Cb1753 | | September 22, 2014 (#14000689) | Address Restricted | Wellington | Archaeological site in Nine Mile Canyon |
| 221 | 42Cb1754 | | September 22, 2014 (#14000691) | Address Restricted | Wellington | Archaeological site in Nine Mile Canyon |
| 222 | 42Cb1756 | | September 12, 2012 (#12000759) | Address Restricted | Wellington | Archaeological site in Nine Mile Canyon, including pictographs |
| 223 | 42Cb1757 | | September 12, 2012 (#12000760) | Address Restricted | Wellington | Archaeological site in Nine Mile Canyon, a one-room Fremont structure |
| 224 | 42Cb1758 | | November 30, 2009 (#09000992) | Address Restricted | Wellington | Archaeological site in Nine Mile Canyon, a complex consisting of an agricultural terrace, a pictograph, and a historical-era lambing pen. Documented in 2002 by the Moab Fire Center in an inventory for the Dry Canyon Fuels Treatment Project. |
| 225 | 42Cb1862 | | September 22, 2014 (#14000695) | Address Restricted | Wellington | Archaeological site in Nine Mile Canyon |
| 226 | 42Cb1910 | | September 22, 2014 (#14000697) | Address Restricted | Wellington | Archaeological site in Nine Mile Canyon |
| 227 | 42Cb2006 | | September 12, 2012 (#12000761) | Address Restricted | Wellington | Archaeological site in Nine Mile Canyon, including petroglyphs |
| 228 | 42Cb2007 | | September 12, 2012 (#12000762) | Address Restricted | Wellington | Archaeological site in Nine Mile Canyon, six panels of elaborate petroglyphs in Gate Canyon |
| 229 | 42Cb2008 | | September 12, 2012 (#12000763) | Address Restricted | Wellington | Archaeological site in Nine Mile Canyon, including petroglyphs, pictographs, and stone artifacts |
| 230 | 42Cb2009 | | September 12, 2012 (#12000764) | Address Restricted | Wellington | Archaeological site in Nine Mile Canyon, including petroglyphs, pictographs, and stone artifacts |
| 231 | 42Cb2018 | | September 12, 2012 (#12000765) | Address Restricted | Wellington | Archaeological site in Nine Mile Canyon, including a one-room structure, rock alignment, wall, ceramic and stone artifacts |
| 232 | 42Cb2019 | | September 12, 2012 (#12000766) | Address Restricted | Wellington | Archaeological site in Nine Mile Canyon, including petroglyphs |
| 233 | 42Cb2023 | | September 12, 2012 (#12000767) | Address Restricted | Wellington | Archaeological site in Nine Mile Canyon, including petroglyphs |
| 234 | 42Cb2024 | | November 30, 2009 (#09000989) | Address Restricted | Wellington | Archaeological site in Nine Mile Canyon, including petroglyphs |
| 235 | 42Cb2025 | | September 12, 2012 (#12000768) | Address Restricted | Wellington | Archaeological site in Nine Mile Canyon, including petroglyphs |
| 236 | 42Cb2028 | | September 12, 2012 (#12000769) | Address Restricted | Wellington | Archaeological site in Nine Mile Canyon, a campsite along the Nine Mile Road, with petroglyphs, historic inscriptions, a hearth, and historic refuse |
| 237 | 42Cb2031 | | September 12, 2012 (#12000770) | Address Restricted | Wellington | Archaeological site in Nine Mile Canyon |
| 238 | 42Cb2043 | | November 30, 2009 (#09001012) | Address Restricted | Wellington | Archaeological site in Nine Mile Canyon, including three granaries, one-room and multi-room structures, a wall, pictographs, petroglyphs, and artifacts |
| 239 | 42Cb2049 | | September 22, 2014 (#14000699) | Address Restricted | Wellington | Archaeological site in Nine Mile Canyon |
| 240 | 42Cb2051 | | September 22, 2014 (#14000700) | Address Restricted | Wellington | Archaeological site in Nine Mile Canyon |
| 241 | 42Cb2052 | | September 22, 2014 (#14000705) | Address Restricted | Wellington | Archaeological site in Nine Mile Canyon |
| 242 | 42Cb2053 | | September 22, 2014 (#14000707) | Address Restricted | Wellington | Archaeological site in Nine Mile Canyon |
| 243 | 42Cb2054 | | September 22, 2014 (#14000711) | Address Restricted | Wellington | Archaeological site in Nine Mile Canyon |
| 244 | 42Cb2055 | | September 22, 2014 (#14000712) | Address Restricted | Wellington | Archaeological site in Nine Mile Canyon |
| 245 | 42Cb2056 | | September 22, 2014 (#14000713) | Address Restricted | Wellington | Archaeological site in Nine Mile Canyon |
| 246 | 42Cb2058 | | September 22, 2014 (#14000714) | Address Restricted | Wellington | Archaeological site in Nine Mile Canyon |
| 247 | 42Cb2059 | | September 22, 2014 (#14000715) | Address Restricted | Wellington | Archaeological site in Nine Mile Canyon |
| 248 | 42Cb2060 | | September 22, 2014 (#14000716) | Address Restricted | Wellington | Archaeological site in Nine Mile Canyon |
| 249 | 42Cb2061 | | September 22, 2014 (#14000717) | Address Restricted | Wellington | Archaeological site in Nine Mile Canyon |
| 250 | 42Cb2062 | | September 22, 2014 (#14000718) | Address Restricted | Wellington | Archaeological site in Nine Mile Canyon |
| 251 | 42Cb2069 | | September 22, 2014 (#14000719) | Address Restricted | Wellington | Archaeological site in Nine Mile Canyon |
| 252 | 42Cb2075 | | September 22, 2014 (#14000720) | Address Restricted | Wellington | Archaeological site in Nine Mile Canyon |
| 253 | 42Cb2080 | | September 22, 2014 (#14000721) | Address Restricted | Wellington | Archaeological site in Nine Mile Canyon |
| 254 | 42Cb2082 | | September 22, 2014 (#14000722) | Address Restricted | Wellington | Archaeological site in Nine Mile Canyon |
| 255 | 42Cb2167 | | September 22, 2014 (#14000723) | Address Restricted | Wellington | Archaeological site in Nine Mile Canyon |
| 256 | 42Cb2171 | | September 22, 2014 (#14000724) | Address Restricted | Wellington | Archaeological site in Nine Mile Canyon |
| 257 | 42Cb2173 | | September 22, 2014 (#14000725) | Address Restricted | Wellington | Archaeological site in Nine Mile Canyon |
| 258 | 42Cb2174 | | September 22, 2014 (#14000726) | Address Restricted | Wellington | Archaeological site in Nine Mile Canyon |
| 259 | 42Cb2192 | | September 22, 2014 (#14000727) | Address Restricted | Wellington | Archaeological site in Nine Mile Canyon |
| 260 | 42Cb2193 | | September 22, 2014 (#14000728) | Address Restricted | Wellington | Archaeological site in Nine Mile Canyon |
| 261 | 42Cb2194 | | September 22, 2014 (#14000729) | Address Restricted | Wellington | Archaeological site in Nine Mile Canyon |
| 262 | 42Cb2196 | | September 22, 2014 (#14000730) | Address Restricted | Wellington | Archaeological site in Nine Mile Canyon |
| 263 | 42Cb2198 | | September 22, 2014 (#14000731) | Address Restricted | Wellington | Archaeological site in Nine Mile Canyon |
| 264 | 42Cb2199 | | September 22, 2014 (#14000732) | Address Restricted | Wellington | Archaeological site in Nine Mile Canyon |
| 265 | 42Cb2204 | | September 22, 2014 (#14000733) | Address Restricted | Wellington | Archaeological site in Nine Mile Canyon |
| 266 | 42Cb2207 | | September 22, 2014 (#14000734) | Address Restricted | Wellington | Archaeological site in Nine Mile Canyon |
| 267 | 42Cb2209 | | September 22, 2014 (#14000740) | Address Restricted | Wellington | Archaeological site in Nine Mile Canyon |
| 268 | 42Cb2214 | | September 22, 2014 (#14000735) | Address Restricted | Wellington | Archaeological site in Nine Mile Canyon |
| 269 | 42Cb2215 | | September 22, 2014 (#14000736) | Address Restricted | Wellington | Archaeological site in Nine Mile Canyon |
| 270 | 42Cb2216 | | September 22, 2014 (#14000737) | Address Restricted | Wellington | Archaeological site in Nine Mile Canyon |
| 271 | 42Cb2218 | | November 30, 2009 (#09000990) | Address Restricted | Wellington | Archaeological site in Nine Mile Canyon, a rock shelter site with pictographs |
| 272 | 42Cb2223 | | September 22, 2014 (#14000738) | Address Restricted | Wellington | Archaeological site in Nine Mile Canyon |
| 273 | 42Cb2234 | | September 22, 2014 (#14000739) | Address Restricted | Wellington | Archaeological site in Nine Mile Canyon |
| 274 | 42Cb2458 | | September 22, 2014 (#14000741) | Address Restricted | Wellington | Archaeological site in Nine Mile Canyon |
| 275 | 42Cb2486 | | September 22, 2014 (#14000742) | Address Restricted | Wellington | Archaeological site in Nine Mile Canyon |
| 276 | 42Cb2487 | | September 22, 2014 (#14000743) | Address Restricted | Wellington | Archaeological site in Nine Mile Canyon |
| 277 | 42Cb2491 | | September 22, 2014 (#14000744) | Address Restricted | Wellington | Archaeological site in Nine Mile Canyon |
| 278 | 42Cb2528 | | September 22, 2014 (#14000745) | Address Restricted | Wellington | Archaeological site in Nine Mile Canyon |
| 279 | 42Cb2531 | | September 22, 2014 (#14000746) | Address Restricted | Wellington | Archaeological site in Nine Mile Canyon |
| 280 | 42Cb2547 | | September 22, 2014 (#14000747) | Address Restricted | Wellington | Archaeological site in Nine Mile Canyon |
| 281 | 42Cb2550 | | September 22, 2014 (#14000748) | Address Restricted | Wellington | Archaeological site in Nine Mile Canyon |
| 282 | 42Cb2557 | | September 22, 2014 (#14000750) | Address Restricted | Wellington | Archaeological site in Nine Mile Canyon |
| 283 | 42Cb2558 | | September 22, 2014 (#14000751) | Address Restricted | Wellington | Archaeological site in Nine Mile Canyon |
| 284 | 42Cb2566 | | September 22, 2014 (#14000752) | Address Restricted | Wellington | Archaeological site in Nine Mile Canyon |
| 285 | 42Cb2736 | | September 22, 2014 (#14000753) | Address Restricted | Wellington | Archaeological site in Nine Mile Canyon |
| 286 | 42Cb2766 | | September 12, 2012 (#12000771) | Address Restricted | Wellington | Archaeological site in Nine Mile Canyon, a small panel of petroglyphs on an irregular surface in Gate Canyon |
| 287 | 42Cb2833 | | September 22, 2014 (#14000755) | Address Restricted | Wellington | Archaeological site in Nine Mile Canyon |
| 288 | 42Cb2845 | | September 22, 2014 (#14000756) | Address Restricted | Wellington | Archaeological site in Nine Mile Canyon |
| 289 | 42Cb2846 | | September 22, 2014 (#14000757) | Address Restricted | Wellington | Archaeological site in Nine Mile Canyon |
| 290 | 42Dc706 | | November 30, 2009 (#09001016) | Address Restricted | Wellington | Archaeological site in Nine Mile Canyon, including petroglyphs |
| 291 | The Alcove | | September 22, 2014 (#14000631) | Address Restricted | Wellington | Archaeological site in Nine Mile Canyon |
| 292 | Albert and Mariah Bryner House | Albert and Mariah Bryner House | September 12, 2008 (#08000858) | 68 S. 100 East; 39°35′55″N 110°48′33″W | Price | |
| 293 | Clerico Commercial Building | Clerico Commercial Building | May 20, 1999 (#99000619) | 4985 N. Spring Glen Rd. 39°40′25″N 110°51′33″W | Spring Glen | |
| 294 | Cottonwood Village | Cottonwood Village | November 30, 2009 (#09001015) | Address Restricted; 39°47′03″N 110°08′17″W | Wellington | Archaeological site in Nine Mile Canyon, a group of Fremont pit-houses on a hill overlooking Nine Mile Creek at the mouth of Cottonwood Canyon |
| 295 | Desolation Canyon | Desolation Canyon | November 24, 1968 (#68000057) | Along the Green River in eastern Carbon County between Ouray and Green River; 39°30′01″N 110°01′19″W | Green River | Split between Emery, Grand, Carbon, and Uintah counties |
| 296 | Drop-Dead Ruin | | November 30, 2009 (#09001014) | Address Restricted | Wellington | Archaeological site in Nine Mile Canyon |
| 297 | First Canyon Site | First Canyon Site | November 30, 2009 (#09001013) | Address Restricted; 39°46′48″N 110°25′28″W | Wellington | Archaeological site in Nine Mile Canyon, the first prominent rock art panel visible from the road on entering the canyon. Includes a hearth, and petroglyphs and pictographs in Archaic, Fremont, and Ute styles |
| 298 | Flat Canyon Archeological District | | December 12, 1978 (#78002654) | Address Restricted | Price | A 320-acre (1.3 km^{2}) site located in Desolation Canyon, at the confluence of Flat Canyon and the Green River. Includes 5 contributing properties: 3 panels of Fremont petroglyphs and 2 sets of masonry structures |
| 299 | The Great Hunt Panel | The Great Hunt Panel | January 18, 2018 (#100001978) | Nine Mile Canyon Rd. 39°46′50″N 110°08′06″W | Wellington | |
| 300 | Oliver John Harmon House | Oliver John Harmon House | August 18, 1992 (#92001058) | 211 S. 200 East; 39°35′47″N 110°48′23″W | Price | |
| 301 | Hellenic Orthodox Church of the Assumption | Hellenic Orthodox Church of the Assumption | April 11, 1973 (#73001861) | 61 S. 2nd East; 39°35′55″N 110°48′26″W | Price | |
| 302 | Helper Historic District | Helper Historic District | July 24, 1979 (#79002491) | Bounded by railroad tracks and Janet, 1st West, and Locust Sts.; also roughly bounded by Maple (400 South), Bryner (600 West), Ridgeway (500 East), and E (450 North) Sts. 39°41′07″N 110°51′13″W | Helper | Boundary increase approved October 31, 2022, along with name change from "Helper Commercial District". |
| 303 | James W. and Mary K. Loofbourow House | James W. and Mary K. Loofbourow House | April 10, 1986 (#86000722) | 187 N. 100 East; 39°36′08″N 110°48′31″W | Price | |
| 304 | Camillo Manina House | | May 20, 1999 (#99000618) | Approximately 1756 W. 4000 North; 39°39′34″N 110°50′52″W | Spring Glen | |
| 305 | Martin Millarich Hall | Martin Millarich Hall | October 31, 1980 (#80003894) | Main St. 39°39′48″N 110°51′12″W | Spring Glen | |
| 306 | Notre Dame de Lourdes Catholic Church | Notre Dame de Lourdes Catholic Church | January 9, 1978 (#78002651) | 200 N. Carbon Ave. 39°36′10″N 110°48′37″W | Price | |
| 307 | Parker and Weeter Block | Parker and Weeter Block | March 9, 1982 (#82004115) | 85 W. Main St. 39°35′58″N 110°48′44″W | Price | |
| 308 | Patti's Place | | September 22, 2014 (#14000653) | Address Restricted | Wellington | Archaeological site in Nine Mile Canyon |
| 309 | Price Main Street | Price Main Street | May 2, 2008 (#08000383) | 100 West to approximately 215 E. Main St. 39°35′58″N 110°48′40″W | Price | |
| 310 | Price Municipal Building | Price Municipal Building | February 17, 1978 (#78002652) | 200 East and Main St. 39°36′00″N 110°48′26″W | Price | |
| 311 | Price Tavern/Braffet Block | Price Tavern/Braffet Block | August 11, 1978 (#78002653) | E. 100 South and Carbon Ave. 39°35′52″N 110°48′36″W | Price | |
| 312 | Star Theatre | Star Theatre | August 9, 1982 (#82004116) | 20 E. Main St. 39°35′59″N 110°48′34″W | Price | |
| 313 | Toovuhsuhvooch Archaeological District | | July 21, 2025 (#100012021) | Address Restricted | Wellington vicinity | In Nine Mile Canyon. |
| 314 | Topolovec Farmstead | | August 9, 1982 (#82004117) | Main St. 39°39′27″N 110°51′09″W | Spring Glen | |
| 315 | US Post Office-Helper Main | US Post Office-Helper Main | November 27, 1989 (#89001995) | 45 S. Main; 39°41′12″N 110°51′13″W | Helper | |
| 316 | US Post Office-Price Main | US Post Office-Price Main | November 27, 1989 (#89001998) | 95 S. Carbon Ave. 39°35′54″N 110°48′37″W | Price | |
| 317 | Verde Homestead | Verde Homestead | February 14, 2007 (#07000079) | 233 S. 200 East; 39°41′05″N 110°51′02″W | Helper | |

== Former listing ==
| | Name on the Register | Image | Date listed | Date removed | Location | City or town | Description |
|---|---|---|---|---|---|---|---|
| 1 | Giacomo and Maria Bruno House and Farmstead | | May 16, 2002 (#02000506) | February 21, 2007 | 524 N. Main St. | Helper | Demolished |

== See also ==
- List of National Historic Landmarks in Utah
- National Register of Historic Places listings in Utah
