= Ninemile Canyon (Utah) =

Canyon in Utah

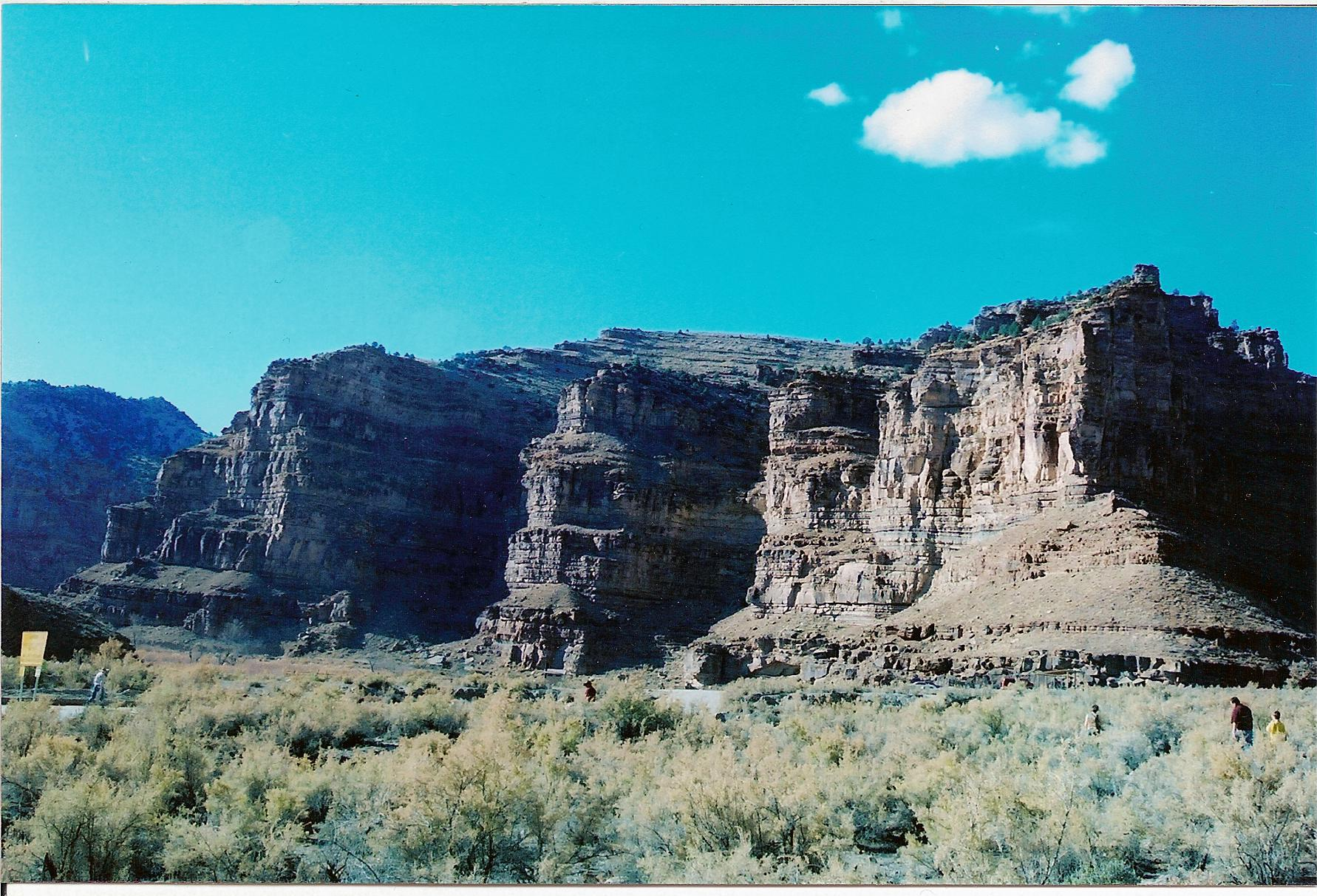
- The Daddy Canyon area of Ninemile Canyon, November 2007

- Location within Utah Location within the United States
- Length: 40 miles (64 km)

Geography
- Location: Carbon and Duchesne counties, Utah, United States
- Coordinates: 39°46′35″N 110°30′0″W
- Traversed by: Utah State Route 53
- River: Nine Mile Creek
- Interactive map of Ninemile Canyon

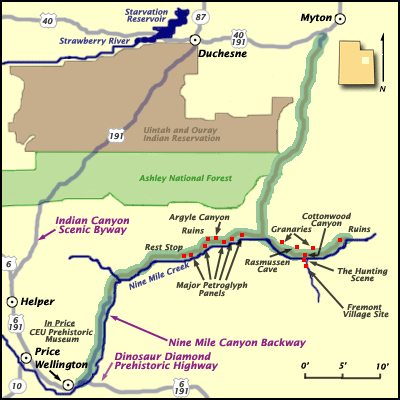
Map of Ninemile Canyon, from National Scenic Byways Program

Ninemile Canyon (also Nine Mile Canyon) is a canyon, approximately 40 miles (60 km) long, located in Carbon and Duchesne counties in eastern Utah, United States. Promoted as "the world's longest art gallery", the canyon is known for its extensive rock art, most of it created by the Fremont culture and the Ute people. The rock art, shelters, and granaries left behind by the Fremont make Ninemile Canyon a destination for archaeologists and tourists alike.

The canyon became a main transport corridor in the region during the 1880s. Settlers established a number of ranches in Ninemile Canyon, and even a short-lived town named Harper. No longer heavily traveled, the rugged canyon road was used mostly for recreation and tourism through the end of the 20th century. The discovery of rich deposits of natural gas deep beneath the West Tavaputs Plateau has brought an influx of industrial truck traffic since 2002. The large amounts of fugitive dust produced by the trucks' passage may be damaging the rock art. Public debate is ongoing about how best to balance energy development in the canyon against the preservation of its cultural resources.

== Geography ==
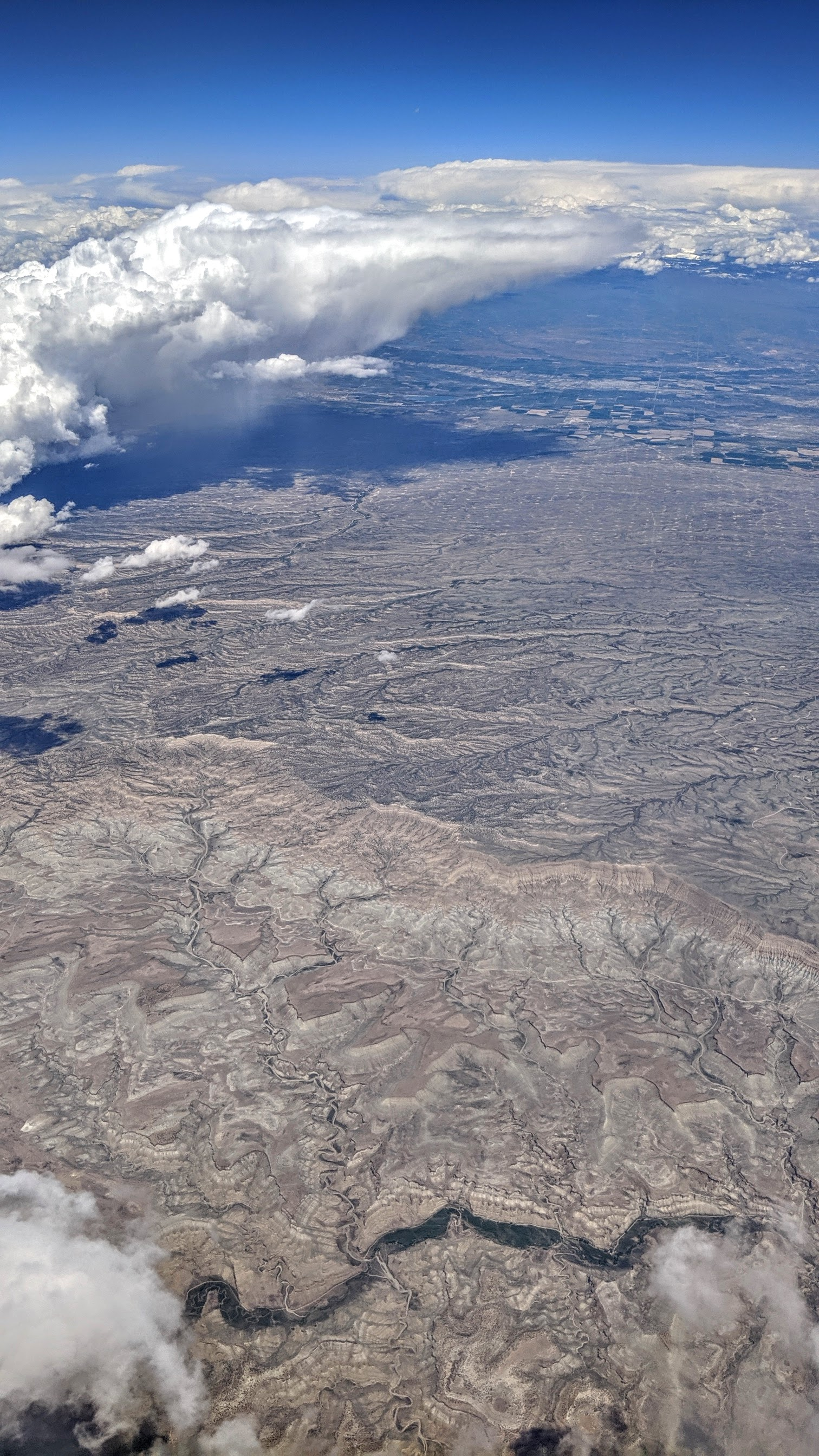
Ninemile Canyon (the dark green area at the bottom) at North Franks Canyon. An array of natural gas wells is visible in the distance, May 2019.

Ninemile Canyon runs roughly southwest to northeast, with numerous winding turns, just to the north of the Book Cliffs, and south and east of Ashley National Forest. The full 78-mile (126 km) canyon route, formerly SR-53 through Gate Canyon, connects the towns of Wellington and Myton. Nine Mile Creek, the stream that formed the canyon, is by no means a major body of water. Its importance lies in the fact that it is one of the few water sources in the region that are reliable year-round, and it has been so since prehistoric times. Nine Mile Creek is actually a minor tributary of the Green River, emptying into Desolation Canyon on the east. A number of tributary canyons branch off Ninemile Cayon itself, including Argyle Canyon, Cottonwood Canyon, Minnie Maud, and Dry Canyon. Significant rock art sites are frequently located near the junctions where they meet the main canyon.

== Archaeology ==
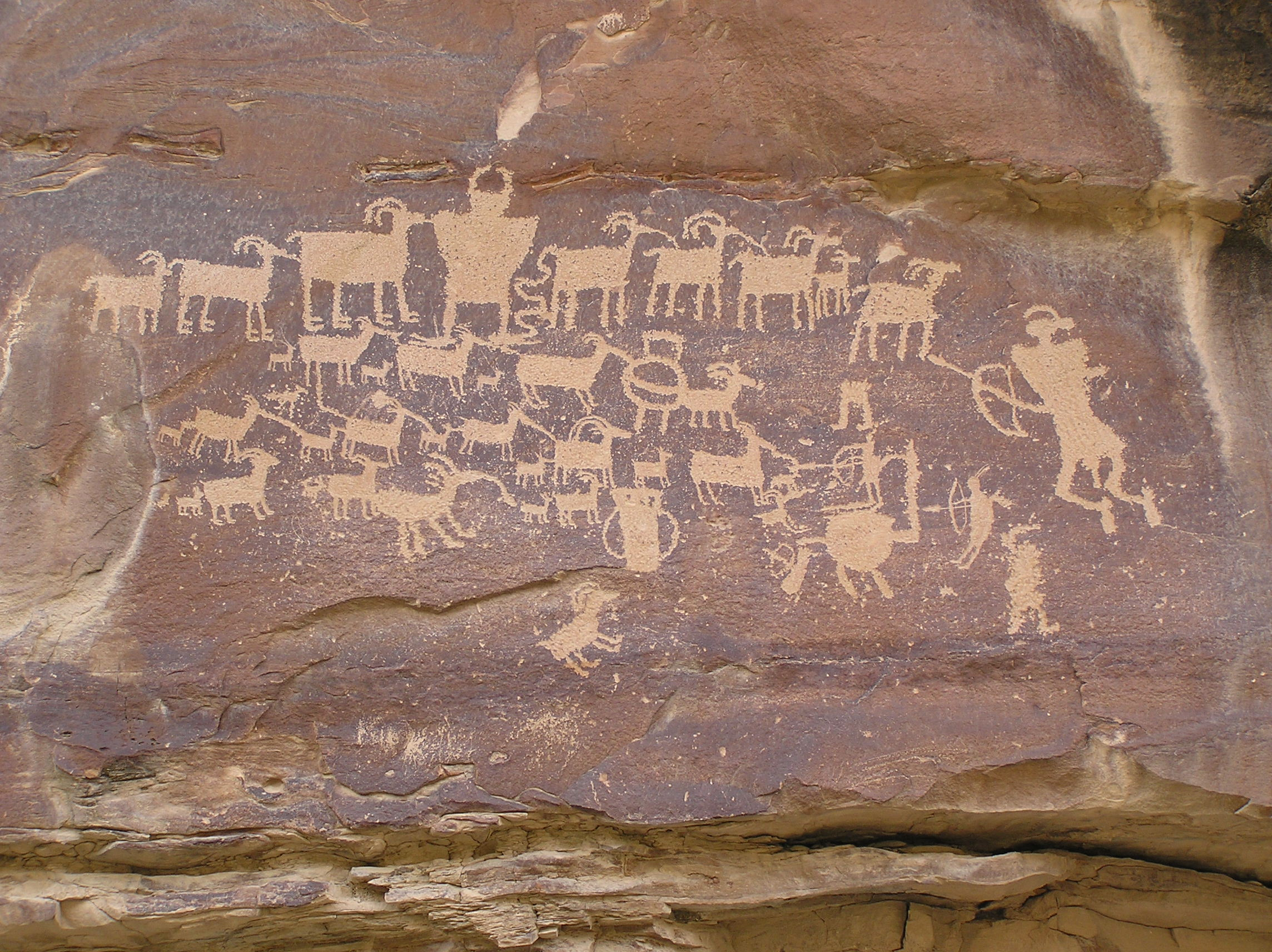
The famous Cottonwood Panel, also called The Great Hunt, May 2006

There are at least an estimated 1,000 rock art sites in the canyon, with more than 10,000 individual images. The true figures may be ten times as high, but there is no question that rock art is more concentrated here than anywhere else in North America. Much is in the form of pecked petroglyphs, and there are many painted pictographs as well. Researchers have also identified hundreds of pit-houses, rock shelters, and granaries, although only a limited amount of excavation has been carried out. Many of these structures are located high above the canyon floor on cliff ledges, pinnacles, and mesas. They were built by the Fremont, whose presence in Ninemile Canyon has been dated at AD 950–1250. Indeed, Ninemile Canyon was one of the locations most heavily occupied by the Fremont. In contrast to the purely hunter-gatherer cultures that surrounded them, the Fremont practiced agriculture, growing corn and squash along the canyon bottom. Compared to other Fremont areas, relatively little pottery is found in Nine Mile, suggesting that beans, which must be boiled for hours to become edible, were not an important part of the local diet. The Fremont left irrigation ditches and earthen lodges on the canyon floor that could be seen as late as the 1930s, but are no longer visible after generations of modern cultivation.

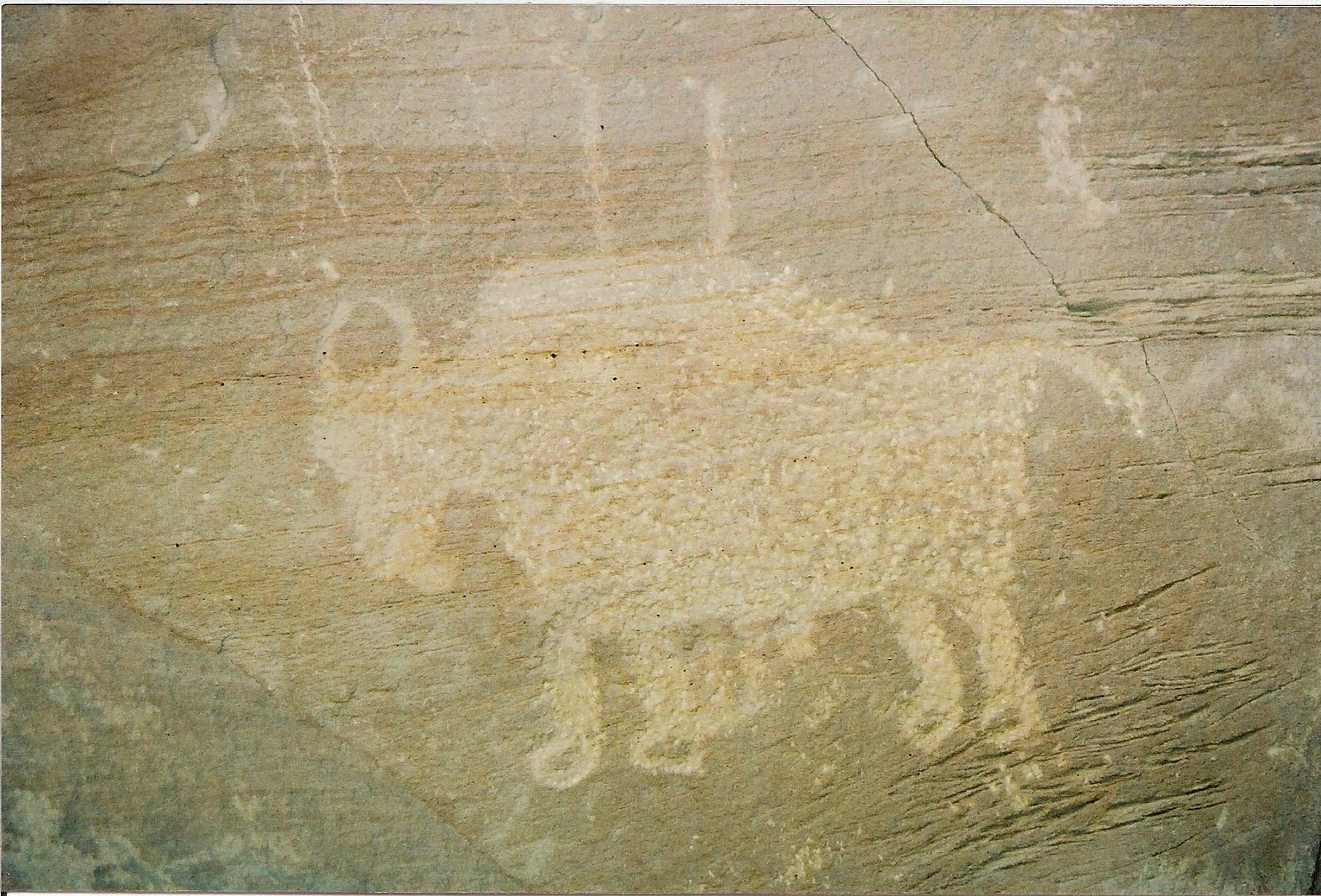
The prints under this bison's hooves indicate Ute origin, November 2007.

By the 16th century the ancestral Utes were in the canyon. They added to the rock art already on the walls, but in styles of their own. Many scenes, for example, depict Ute hunters on horseback and date to the 1800s. Despite the number of Ute artifacts found in Nine Mile, there is no archaeological evidence of any Ute camps or residences.

=== Archaeological sites ===
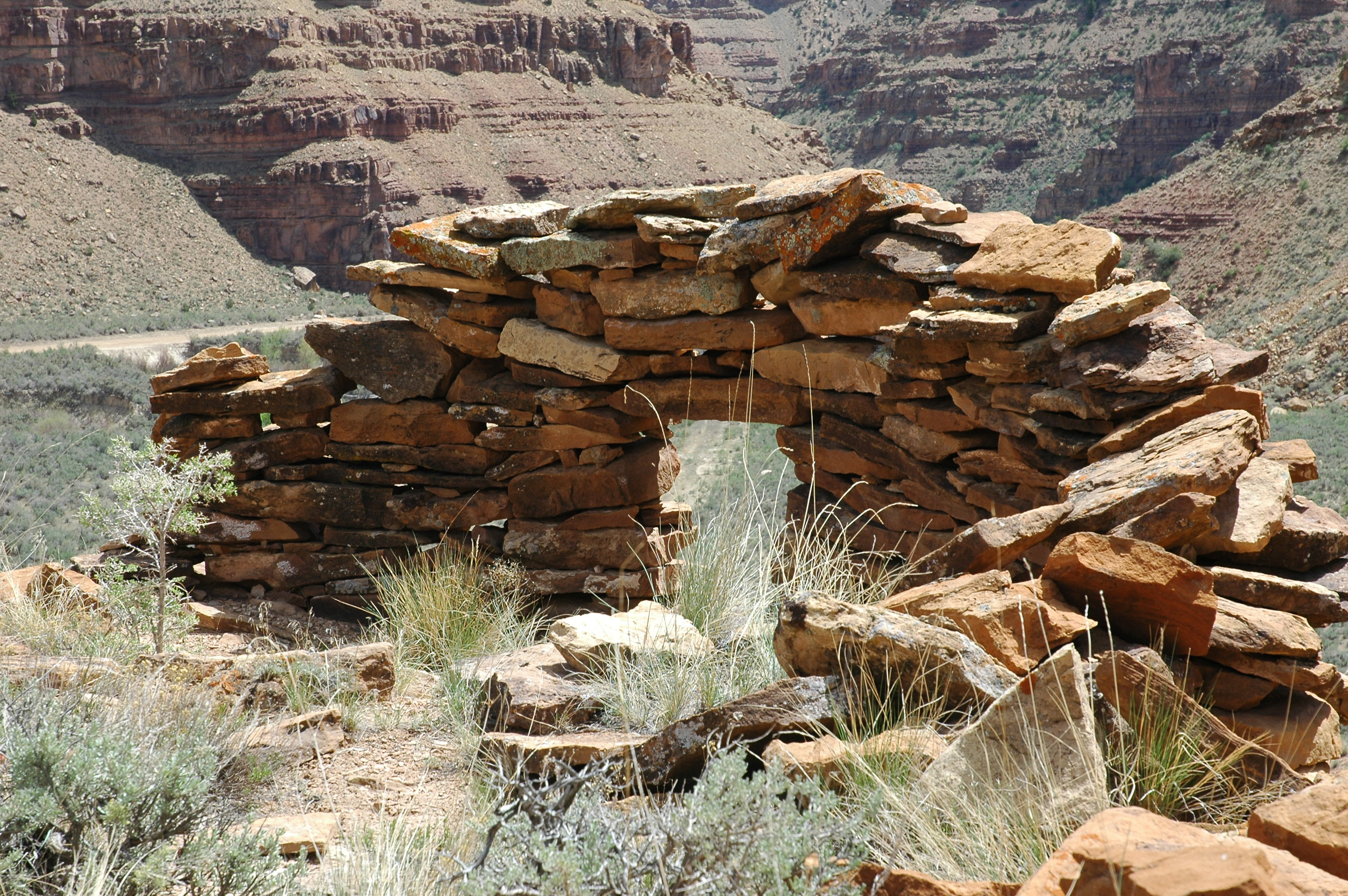
Stone shelter at Redman Village, April 2007

In 2009, 63 archaeological sites in the canyon were listed on the U.S. National Register of Historic Places, 36 in Carbon County and 27 in Duchesne County. Most are named in the National Register listing only by their Smithsonian trinomial codes, but there were three named sites in Carbon County: Cottonwood Village, Drop-Dead Ruin, and First Canyon Site. The named ones in Duchesne County are Centennial House, Fool's Pinnacle, Karen's Cist, Maxies Pad, Nordell's Fort, Redman Village, Sunstone Village, and Taylor's City. The locations and details of these sites are not disclosed by the National Register. The 63 sites include 40 Fremont constructions, 19 rock art sites, and 4 sets of historical-era dwellings. A further 165 sites were added on September 12, 2012, all of them designated by codes only. Of these additional listings, 158 are in Carbon County and 7 in Duchesne County. On September 22, 2014, 101 more sites were added, all in Carbon County.

== History ==
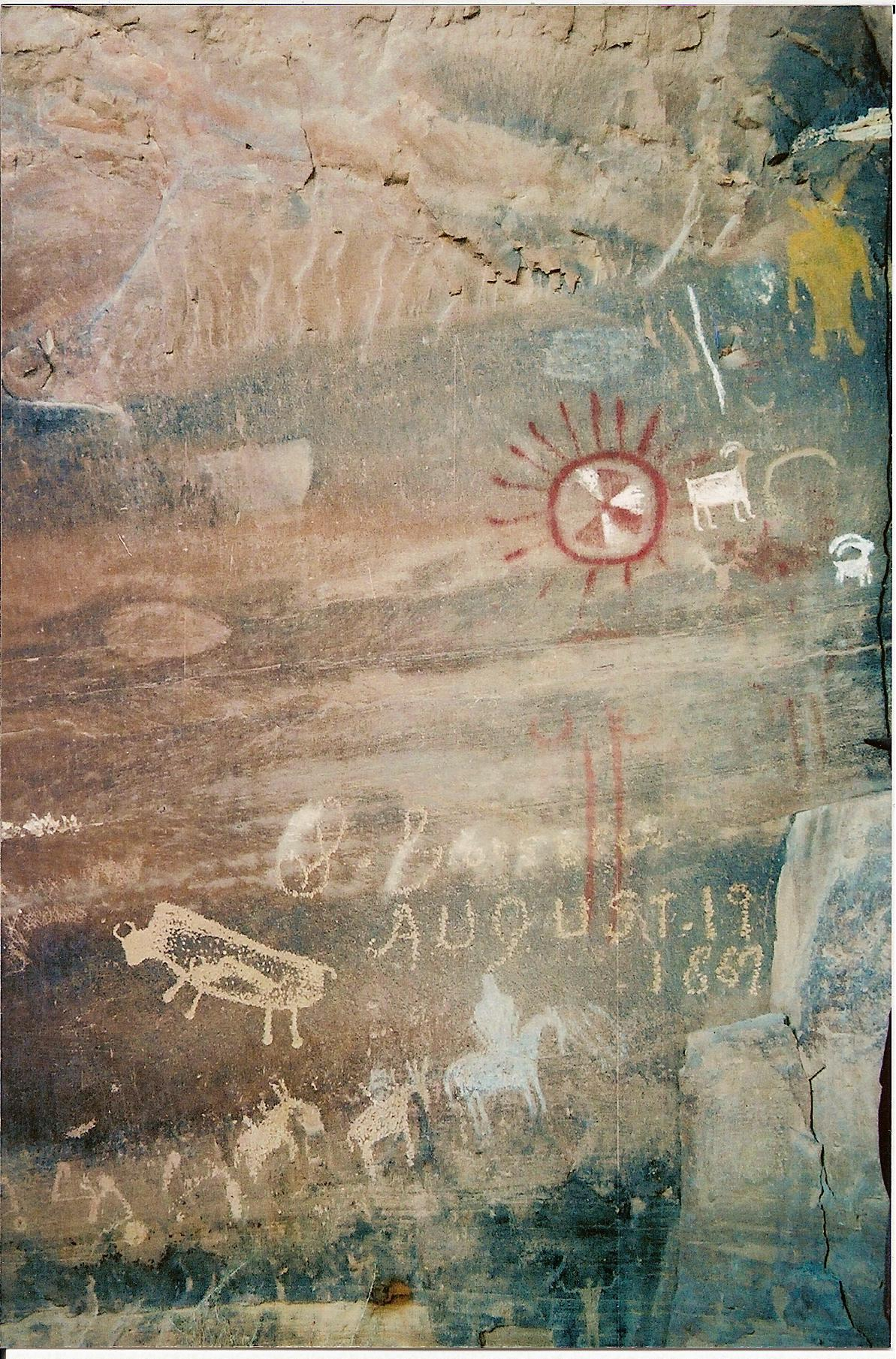
Rock art from Archaic to modern, November 2007

There is some evidence that American fur trappers may have entered the canyon in the early 19th century, but the first unequivocal sign of a white presence is an inscription on the canyon wall reading "S. Groesbeck August 19, 1867". John Wesley Powell's second Colorado River expedition camped at the mouth of the canyon in 1871, and the earliest appearance of the name Nine Mile Canyon is in records of the expedition.

Nine Mile Canyon Road (also 9 Mile Canyon Road) was constructed through the canyon in 1886 by the Buffalo Soldiers of the 9th Cavalry Regiment, linking Fort Duchesne to the railroad through the city of Price. Use of the road surged in 1889 after the discovery of Gilsonite in the Uinta Basin. This was the main transportation route in eastern Utah until well into the 20th century. Most of the stagecoach, mail, freight, and telegraph traffic into the Uinta Basin passed through Ninemile Canyon until after the arrival of the Uintah Railway around 1905.

The freight trade led to the settlement of the canyon itself. One of the main stagecoach stops developed into a town of sorts. Called Harper, it included a hotel, store, school, and an unofficial post office. It lacked a formal town site, simply taking in a long stretch of scattered ranches and buildings. The community grew gradually from the 1880s until it was officially established as the town of Harper in 1905. The Harper precinct as a whole had a population of 130 at its peak in 1910, but in the early 1920s Harper became a ghost town.

== Current issues ==
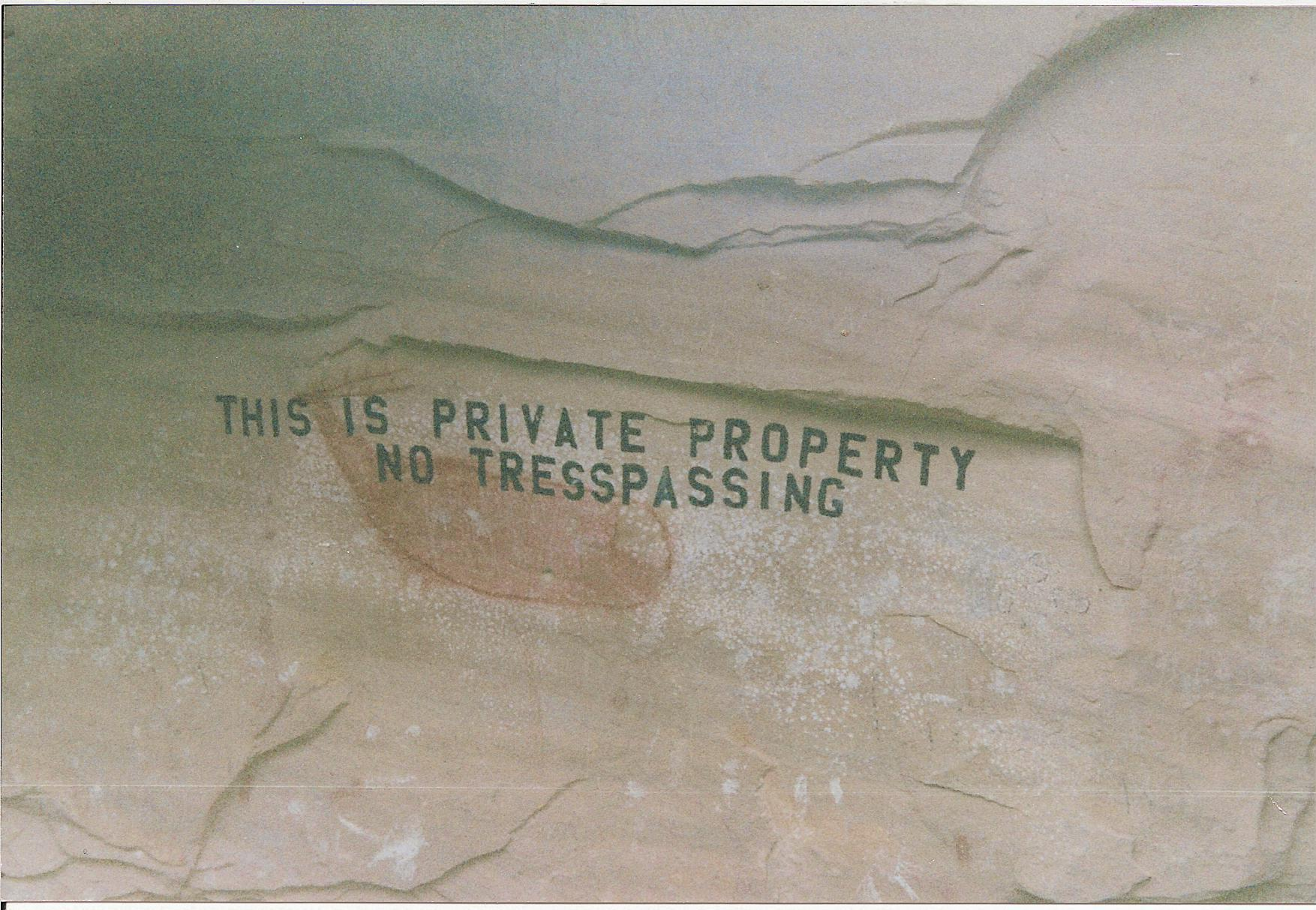
Defaced rock art in Rasmussen Cave, April 2007

Rock art and other ancient artifacts are now protected by law and, although enforcement is difficult, outright looting and malicious vandalism are largely a thing of the past. Ninemile Canyon's rock art, however, is still at risk. Carved and painted mainly on weathered sandstone panels, the images are susceptible to erosion, which is accelerated by touching and airborne dust. The dust is a special concern as heavy industrial traffic in the canyon increases.

Nine Mile Canyon Road, once such an important route, was almost completely unpaved until 2013. In fact, it was considered the poorest of the four old military roads in Duchesne County. In 1990, the U.S. Bureau of Land Management (BLM) designated it as a Scenic Backcountry Byway. The Ninemile Canyon Paving project was completed in October of 2014, with a total of 34 miles (55 km) of paved roadway constructed.

=== Natural gas development ===
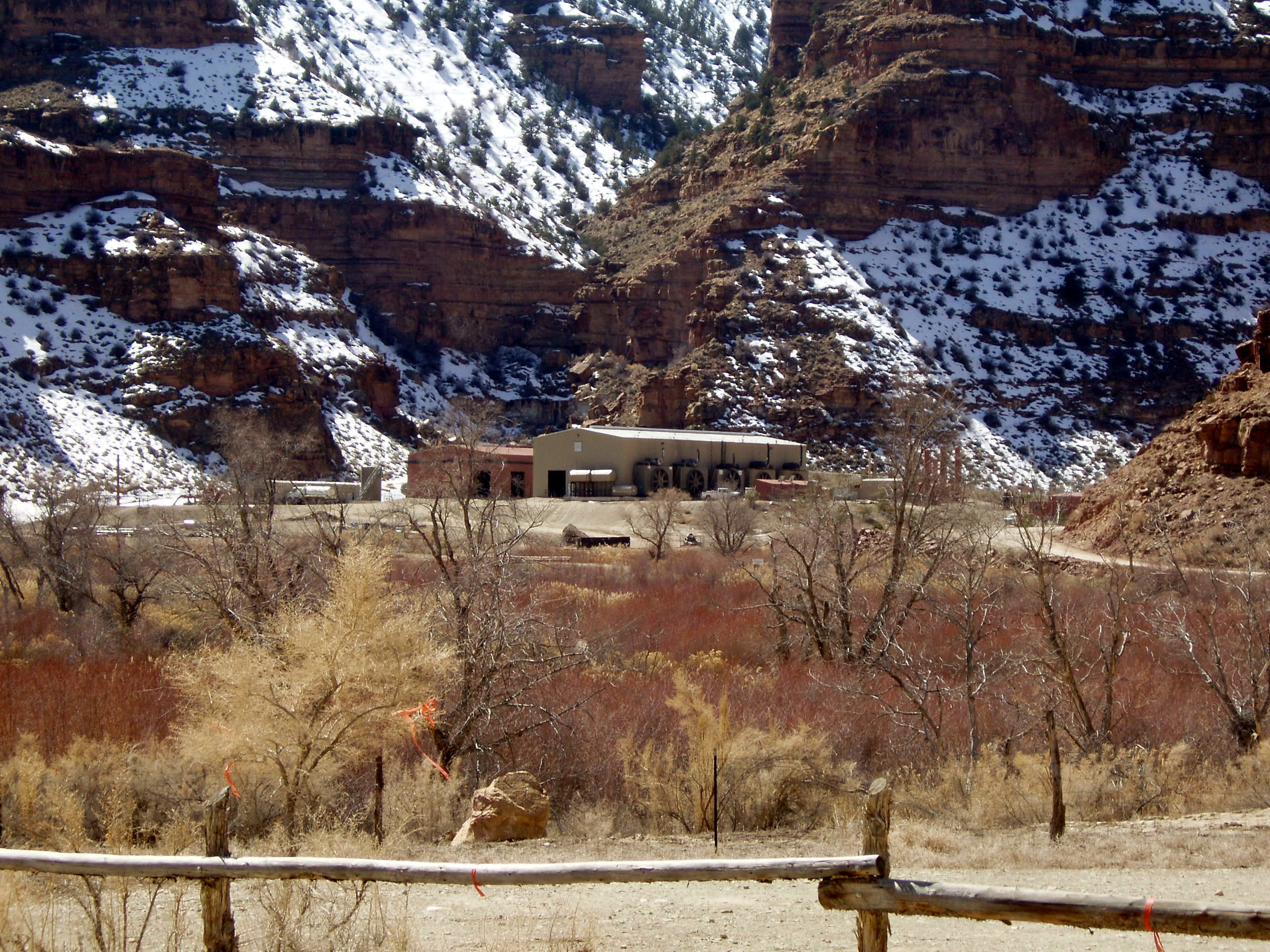
Bill Barrett Corporation's natural gas compressor station, at the Dry Canyon junction, March 2008

Nine Mile's unique archaeological resources have led to intense debate over land use. As in many rural areas of the Western United States, land in the canyon is a patchwork of public and private property. Archaeological sites are found on both. Commercially important deposits of minerals and other geological resources have also been discovered, further complicating the issues. Since 2002, the Bill Barrett Corporation, in cooperation with the BLM and private landowners, has been pursuing a natural gas exploration project on the West Tavaputs Plateau in and around the canyon. The company estimates the available natural gas reserves at approximately 1 trillion cubic feet (2.8×10^{10} m^{3}). Bill Barrett Corporation has spent some $2 million on improving area roads, and the complete project, if approved as planned, could create as many as 1000 jobs. Government involvement in the project has been controversial, drawing complaints from conservation groups that not enough is being done to protect natural and cultural resources.

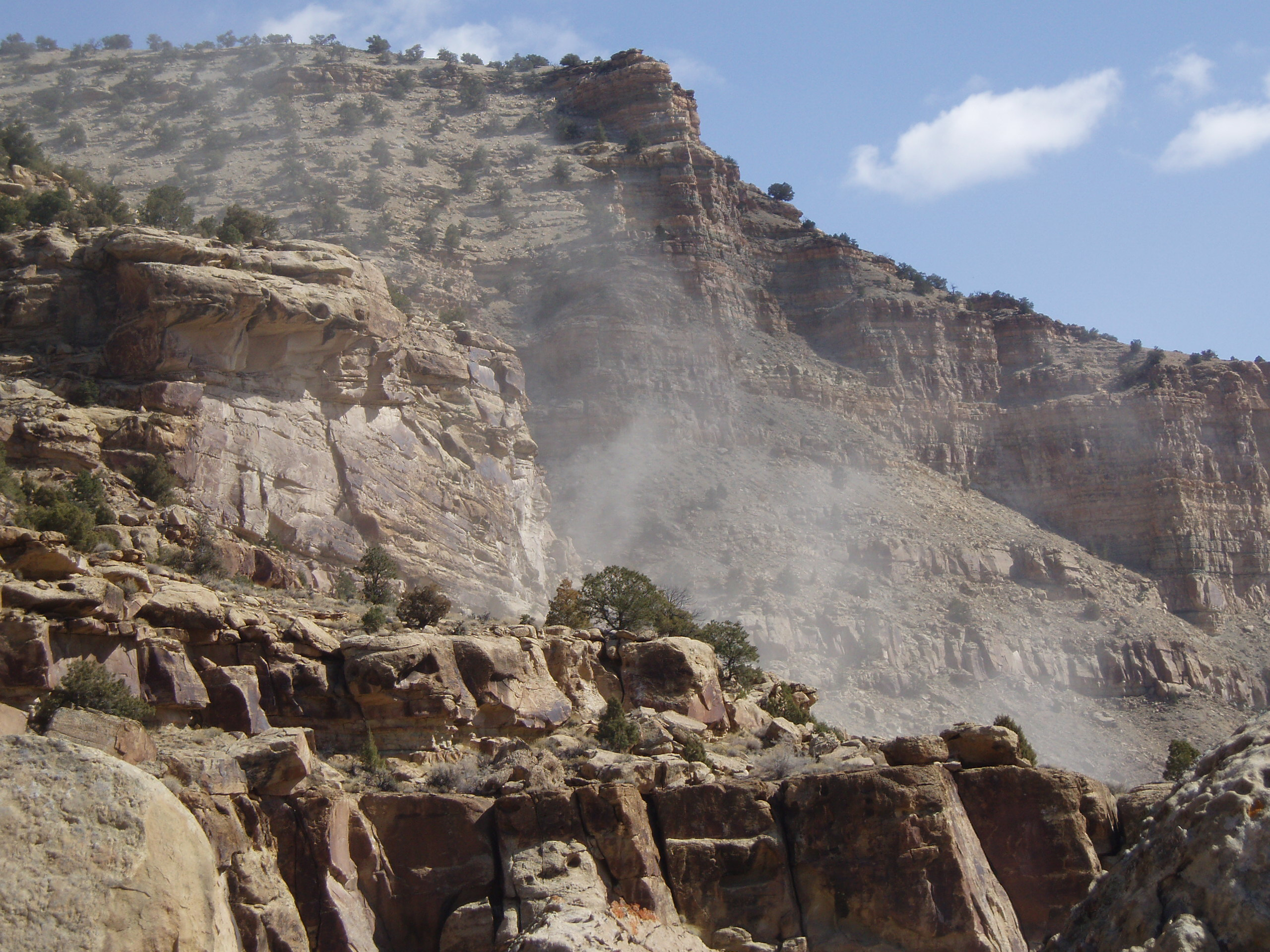
Road dust drifts up the canyon, March 2008.

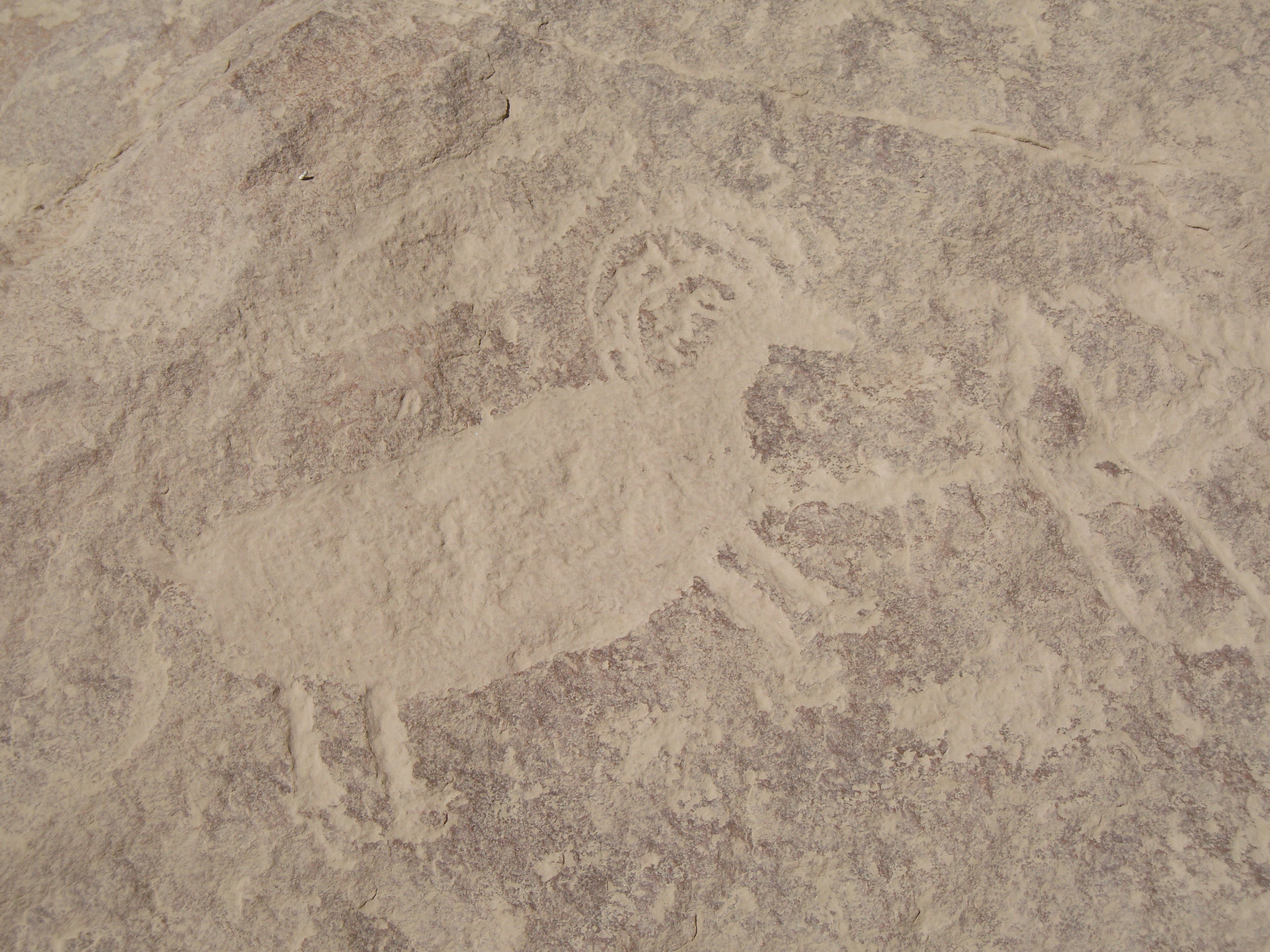
Dust-covered petroglyphs, March 2008

Previous to 2013, industrial truck traffic on Nine Mile's main road were producing clouds of dust. Prior to paving, the dirt road was not maintained for heavy traffic. The dust reduced visibility on the road and settled on the rock art. Carbon County, which supervises the use of the road, approved the application of magnesium chloride on the road as a dust abatement measure. The compound pulled moisture from the air to dampen dust, but it may have done more harm than good as the magnesium chloride dust may have drifted on to the rock walls. A 2007 study, commissioned by the BLM and paid for by Bill Barrett Corporation, found that the dust that lands on a rock art panel created "a very serious conservation problem."

In 2004, due to concerns about energy development and increasing recreational and tourist traffic, Ninemile Canyon was named on the National Trust for Historic Preservation's list of America's Most Endangered Places. In 2009, 63 sites in the canyon were added to the National Register of Historic Places, with another 164 added in 2012 and 101 in 2014, and the BLM has announced plans to nominate some 600 more in years to come.

== See also ==
- National Register of Historic Places listings in Carbon County, Utah
- National Register of Historic Places listings in Duchesne County, Utah
