= Parker and Weeter Block =

- U.S. National Register of Historic Places
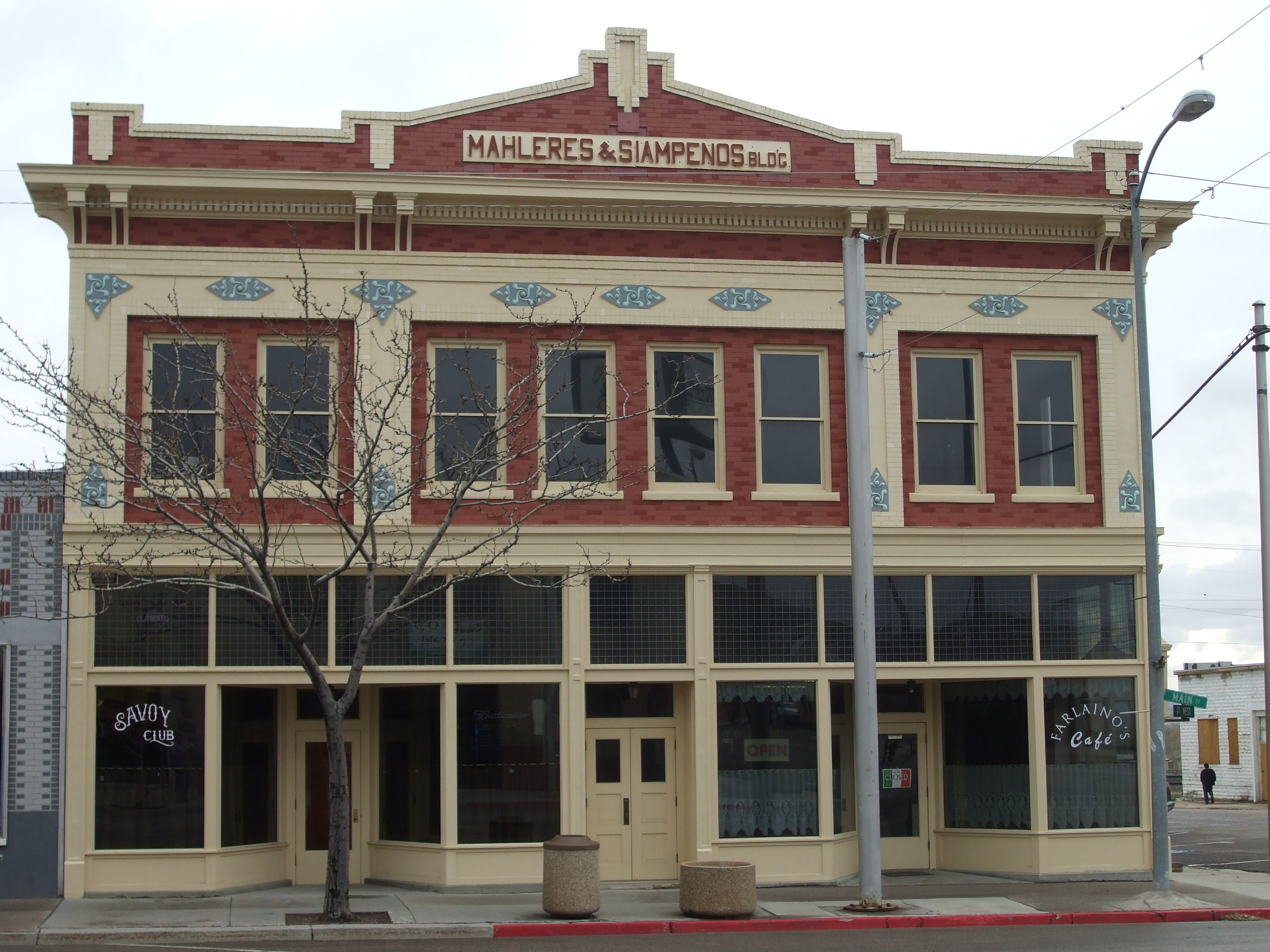
- The building in 2009

- Location within Utah Location within the United States
- Location: 85 West Main Street, Price, Utah
- Coordinates: 39°35′58″N 110°48′44″W
- Area: less than one acre
- Built: 1913
- Architectural style: Prairie School
- NRHP reference No.: 82004115
- Added to NRHP: March 9, 1982

The Parker and Weeter Block is a historic two-story building in Price, Utah. It was built in 1913 by John C. Weeter, Frank L. Parker and James W. Loofbourow. Its design has elements of Prairie School style including paired brackets and dentils at its cornice, and horizontal lines. It was acquired by Harry Mahleres and Sam Sampenos in 1938–1939, two immigrants from Greece who were brothers-in-law. It has been listed on the National Register of Historic Places since March 9, 1982.
