= Minnie Maud =

Coordinates: 39°46′30″N 110°30′36″W

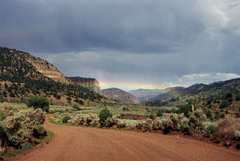
Confluence of Minnie Maud and Nine Mile Creeks

Minnie Maud is the name of a creek and canyon in eastern Utah that is noted as the western starting point of the Ninemile Canyon petroglyphs section. Minnie Maud Creek is a stream whose headwaters begin where the West Tavaputs Plateau and Wasatch Plateau meet the Uinta Mountains.

The creek flows through a comparatively narrow valley and has limited irrigation possibilities. It has a general easterly course and merges with Nine Mile Creek. Minnie Maud Creek drains into Nine Mile Creek which reaches the Green River in Desolation Canyon.

Minnie Maud Canyon which is formed by Minnie Maud Creek is relatively narrow and lacks Fremont Cultural ruins and writings that are abundant in Nine Mile Canyon. Due to its narrow nature, Minnie Maud Canyon was never permanently settled, although a school district that served residents in Nine Mile Canyon was briefly opened in the canyon in 1896 and took the name Minnie Maud. Minnie Maud School District lacked the necessary funds and closed in 1898 with only 43 students.

John Wesley Powell named the creek for his niece, the pioneering American violin virtuoso (Minnie) Maud Powell (1867-1920). Maud Powell was the daughter of John Wesley Powell's brother Bramwell.

== See also ==
- List of canyons and gorges in Utah
- List of rivers of Utah
