= Bill Barrett Corporation =

- Type: Public
- Industry: oil exploration
- Founded: 2002
- Founder: William J. "Bill" Barrett
- Defunct: 2017
- Fate: Merged with HighPoint Resources
- Headquarters: Denver, Colorado
- Key people: Bill Barrett, Founder; Fredrick J. Barrett, CEO and chairman
- Revenue: ▲US$698M (FY 2010)
- Operating income: ▲US$183M (FY 2010)
- Net income: ▲US$80.5M (FY 2010)
- Total assets: ▲US$2.04B (FY 2010)
- Total equity: ▲US$1.14B (FY 2010)
- Number of employees: 280
- Website: www.billbarrettcorp.com

Bill Barrett Corporation was an energy company based in Denver, Colorado. Its core business is natural gas and oil exploration and development in the Rocky Mountains region of the United States.

== History ==
William J. "Bill" Barrett founded the company in January 2002 after his previous company, Barrett Resources, was acquired by the Williams Companies in August 2001. Bill Barrett Corporation went public in December 2004. Barrett stepped down as chairman and CEO in 2006, and was succeeded by his son Fredrick J. Barrett.

One company project that has drawn press coverage and public debate is the development of natural gas reserves in the West Tavaputs Plateau, in and around Nine Mile Canyon, in Utah's Uinta Basin. This find won the trade publication Oil and Gas Investor's 2005 Excellence Award for Best Discovery.

Bill Barrett Corporation merged into HighPoint Resources Corp in 2017, which subsequently merged with Bonanza Creek Energy, Inc.
