= John Alfred Headlund =

American architect

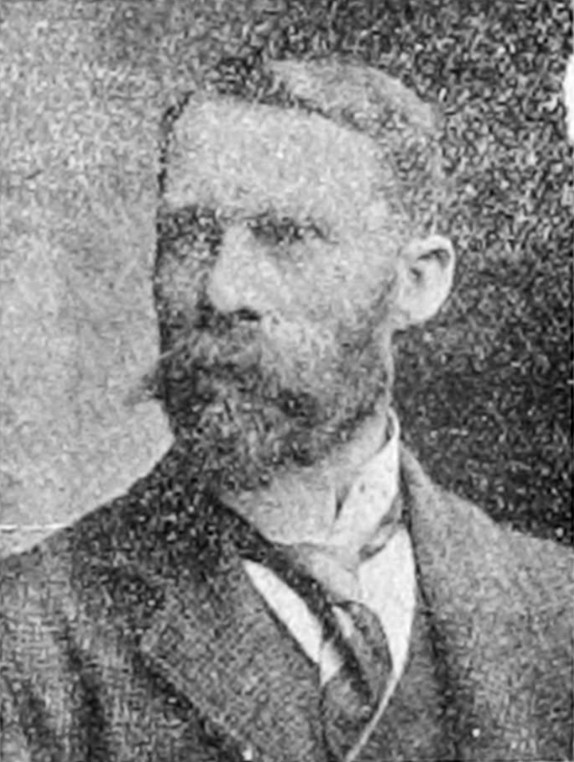
- Born: May 30, 1863; Ängelholm, Skåne, Sweden
- Died: January 2, 1943 (aged 79); Salt Lake City, Utah, U.S.
- Occupation: Architect
- Spouse: Annie Miller (1862–1929)

John Alfred Headlund (May 30, 1863 - January 2, 1943) was an American architect.

In 1891, he went into the profession of architecture in Salt Lake City. He became a member of the Utah Association of Architect in 1910.

He designed many buildings in the state of Utah, including the NRHP-listed Star Theatre, the J. G. McDonald Chocolate Company Building, and the George M. Cannon House.
