= J. G. McDonald Chocolate Company Building =

Historic building in Salt Lake City, Utah, U.S.

- J.G. McDonald Chocolate Company Building
- U.S. National Register of Historic Places
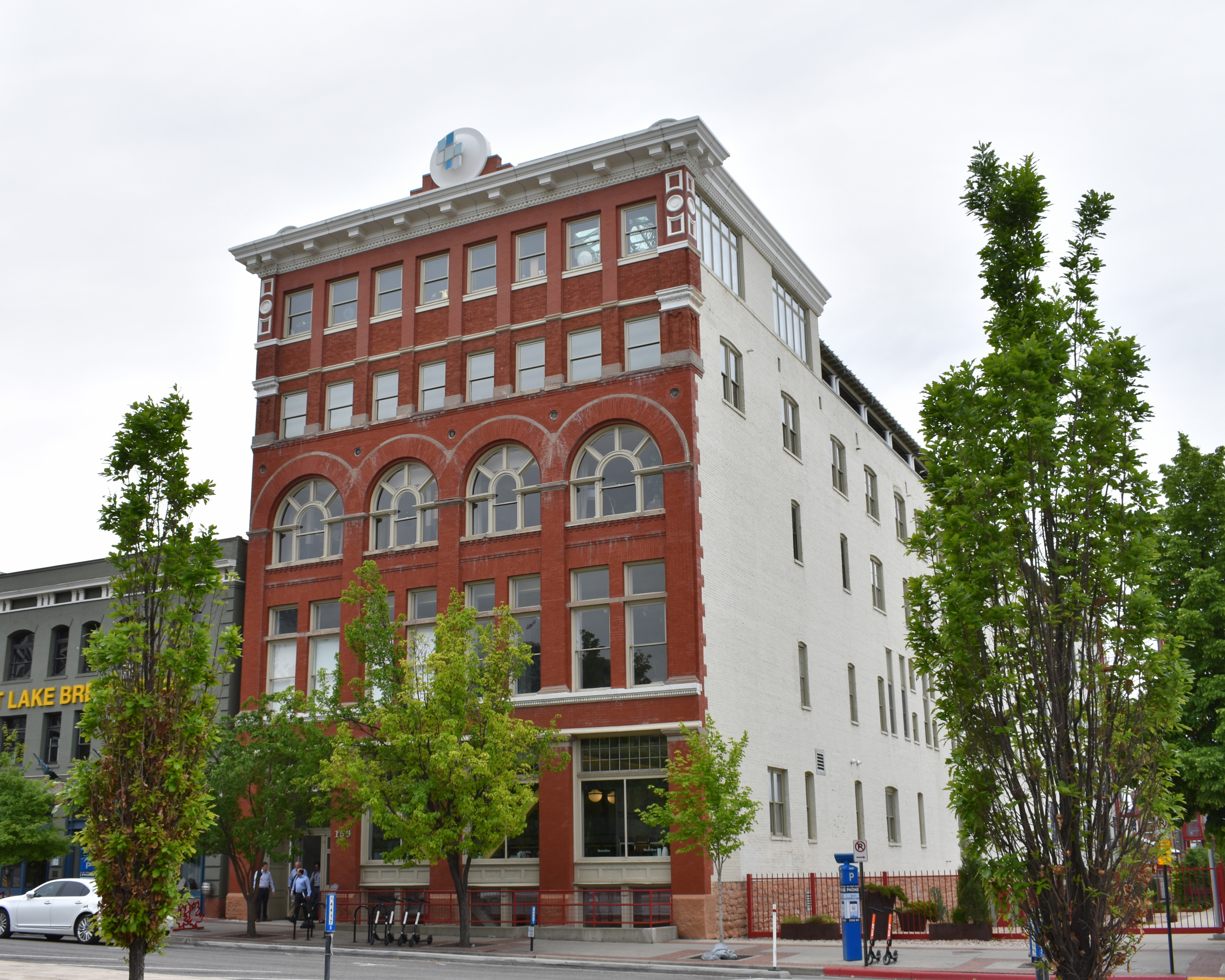
- The J.G. McDonald Chocolate Co. Building in 2019

- Location within Utah Location within the United States
- Location: 155--159 West 300 South, Salt Lake City, Utah; United States
- Coordinates: 40°45′45″N 111°53′44″W
- Area: less than one acre
- Built: 1901
- Architect: Headlund, John A.
- Architectural style: Early Commercial, Late 19th And Early 20th Century American Movements, Sullivanesque
- NRHP reference No.: 78002676
- Added to NRHP: March 29, 1978

The J.G. McDonald Chocolate Company Building in Salt Lake City, Utah, United States, is a 4-story commercial structure designed by John A. Headlund and completed in 1901. The original 3-story brick and stone building was expanded to four stories soon after construction, and it continued to expand as the company grew. The building was added to the National Register of Historic Places in 1978, and it is now included in the Warehouse District.

== History ==
McDonald Brothers was founded by John T. McDonald, a wholesale grocer and confectioner, in 1863. In 1883 his son, James G. McDonald, became president. By 1890 the company specialized in candy and operated under the name James G. McDonald & Co., and in 1899 the firm employed 126 workers. In 1900 the firm incorporated as the J.G. McDonald Candy Co., and in 1912 the company name changed to J.G. McDonald Chocolate Company. The J.G. McDonald Chocolate Company Building was constructed in 1901, and at the new site the company increased employment to 400 workers.

Major expansions at the building occurred in 1912 and in 1920. After the 1920 expansion, the building was large enough to contain four factory operations, including manufacture of cardboard and wicker-basket candy boxes.

== See also ==
- National Register of Historic Places listings in Salt Lake City
