= Star Theatre (Price, Utah) =

- U.S. National Register of Historic Places
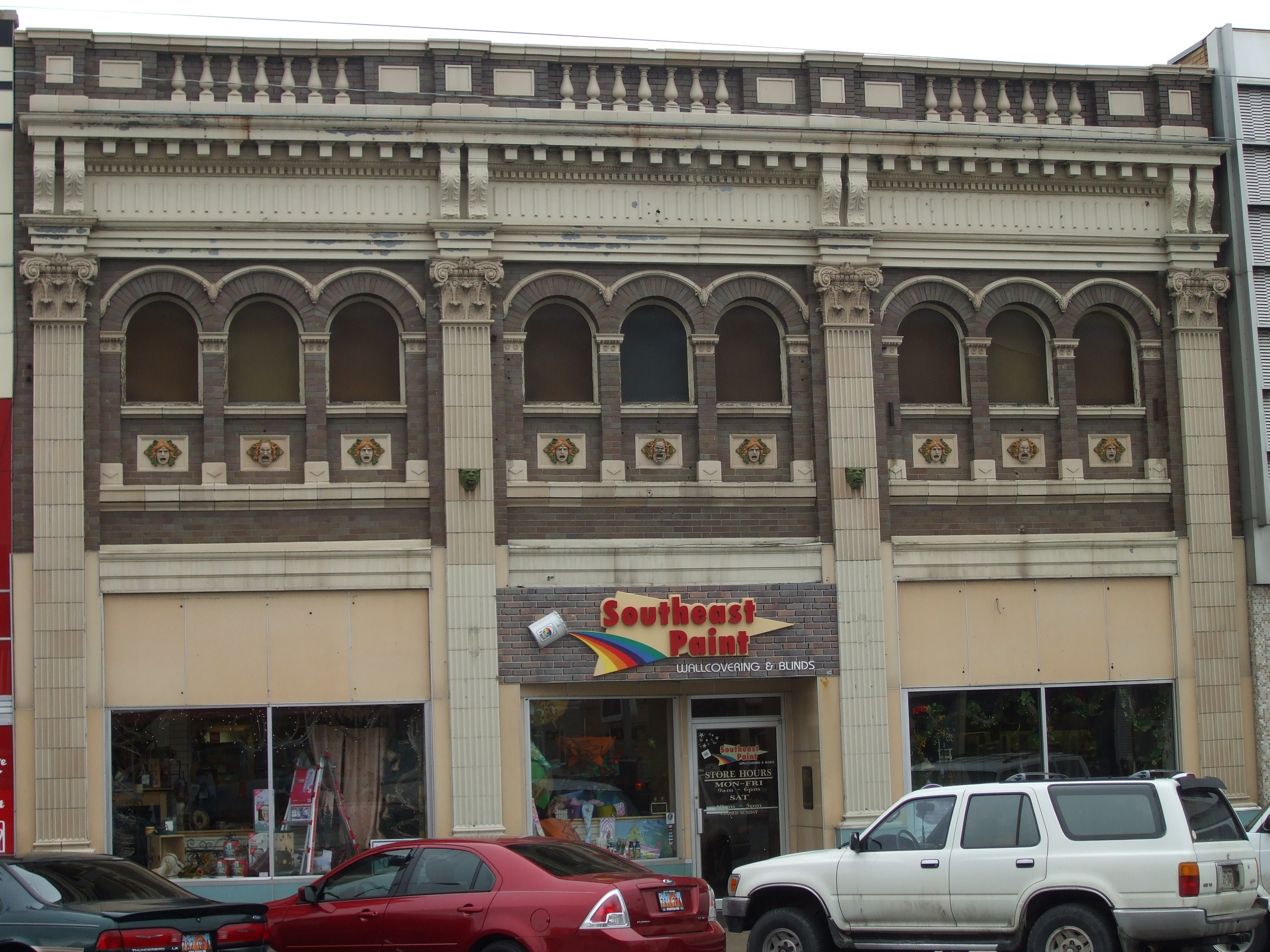
- The building in 2009

- Location within Utah Location within the United States
- Location: 20 East Main Street, Price, Utah
- Coordinates: 39°35′59″N 110°48′34″W
- Area: less than one acre
- Built: 1923
- Architect: John Alfred Headlund
- Architectural style: Classical Revival
- NRHP reference No.: 82004116
- Added to NRHP: August 9, 1982

The Star Theatre is a historic two-story building in Price, Utah. It was built in 1923-1924 for five brothers who were immigrants from Greece: Pete, Angelo, Charlie, George and Harry Georgedes. The building was designed in the Classical Revival style by architect J.A. Headlund, an immigrant from Sweden, with "fluted pilasters with Corinthian capitals; bands of round arch windows; an elaborate entablature with modillions on the cornice; egg and dart molding and dentils on the frieze and an architrave; and a parapet.". It has been listed on the National Register of Historic Places since August 9, 1982.
