= Helper Historic District =

Historic district in Helper, Utah, United States

- U.S. National Register of Historic Places
- U.S. Historic district
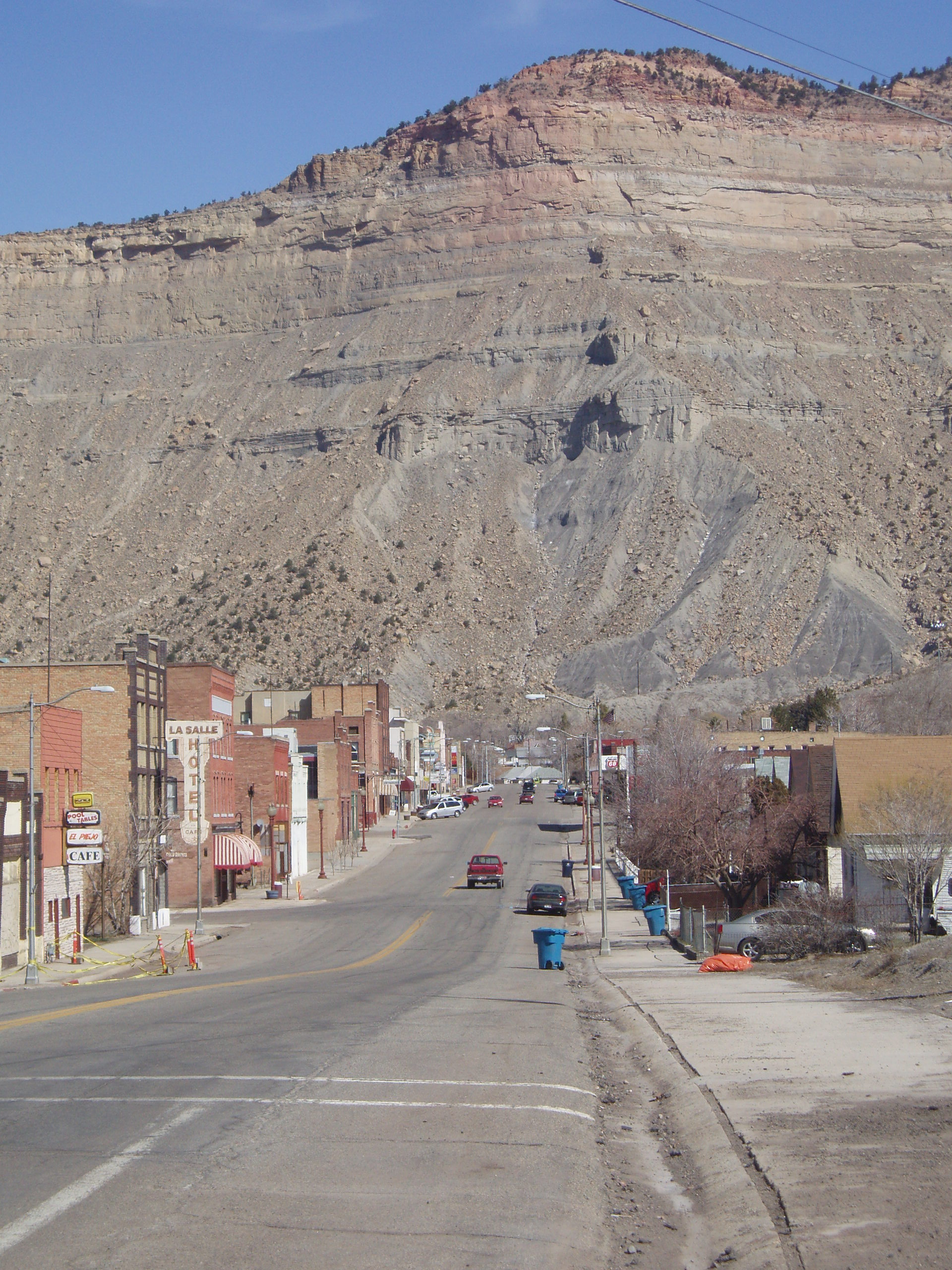
- North along Main Street (US 6 Bus.) within the Helper Historic District, March 2008

- Location within Utah Location within the United States
- Location: Bounded by RR tracks and Janet, 1st, West, and Locust Streets; Helper, Utah; United States
- Coordinates: 39°41′06.09″N 110°51′16.34″W
- Area: 30 acres (12 ha)
- Built: 1913
- Architectural style: Company Town Style
- NRHP reference No.: 79002491 (original); 100008303 (increase)

Significant dates
- Added to NRHP: July 24, 1979
- Boundary increase: October 31, 2022

The Helper Historic District is a historic district comprising the center of Helper, Utah, United States, that is listed on the National Register of Historic Places (NRHP).

== Description ==
When originally listed on the NRHP in 1979, the district was called the Helper Commercial District. It was bounded by Janet Street to the north and Locust Street to the south, and by First West Street to the west and the Denver and Rio Grande Western Railroad (D&RGW) yards to the east. It comprised 110 buildings, 98 of which are considered contributing structures. Typical buildings are one to two stories tall in a variety of styles, mostly built in red brick. The district included a number of modest one-story residences, built by the railroad and mining companies in the manner of a company town. The district represented Helper's development as the commercial center of the local coal-mining industry, and as a railroad service center.

The most significant structures in the district are the Helper City Hall and the Civic Auditorium. Other important contributing structures include the Railroad Chapel and the Catholic church. Several sites are associated with Japanese, Greek, South Slav, and northern Italian immigration to the area. Many structures are associated with the Denver and Rio Grande Western Railroad (D&RGW), including the train station. During the 1930s the town center was extensively altered by Works Progress Administration forces, who built retaining walls and channelized the Price River, filling in the bed in the area that is now the northern part of the district.

The Helper Commercial District was listed on the NRHP on July 24, 1979. The Helper Post Office is individually listed on the National Register within the district. The district underwent a significant expansion and renaming in 2022.

== See also ==
- National Register of Historic Places listings in Carbon County, Utah
