= United States Post Office-Helper Main =

- U.S. Post Office-Helper Main
- U.S. National Register of Historic Places
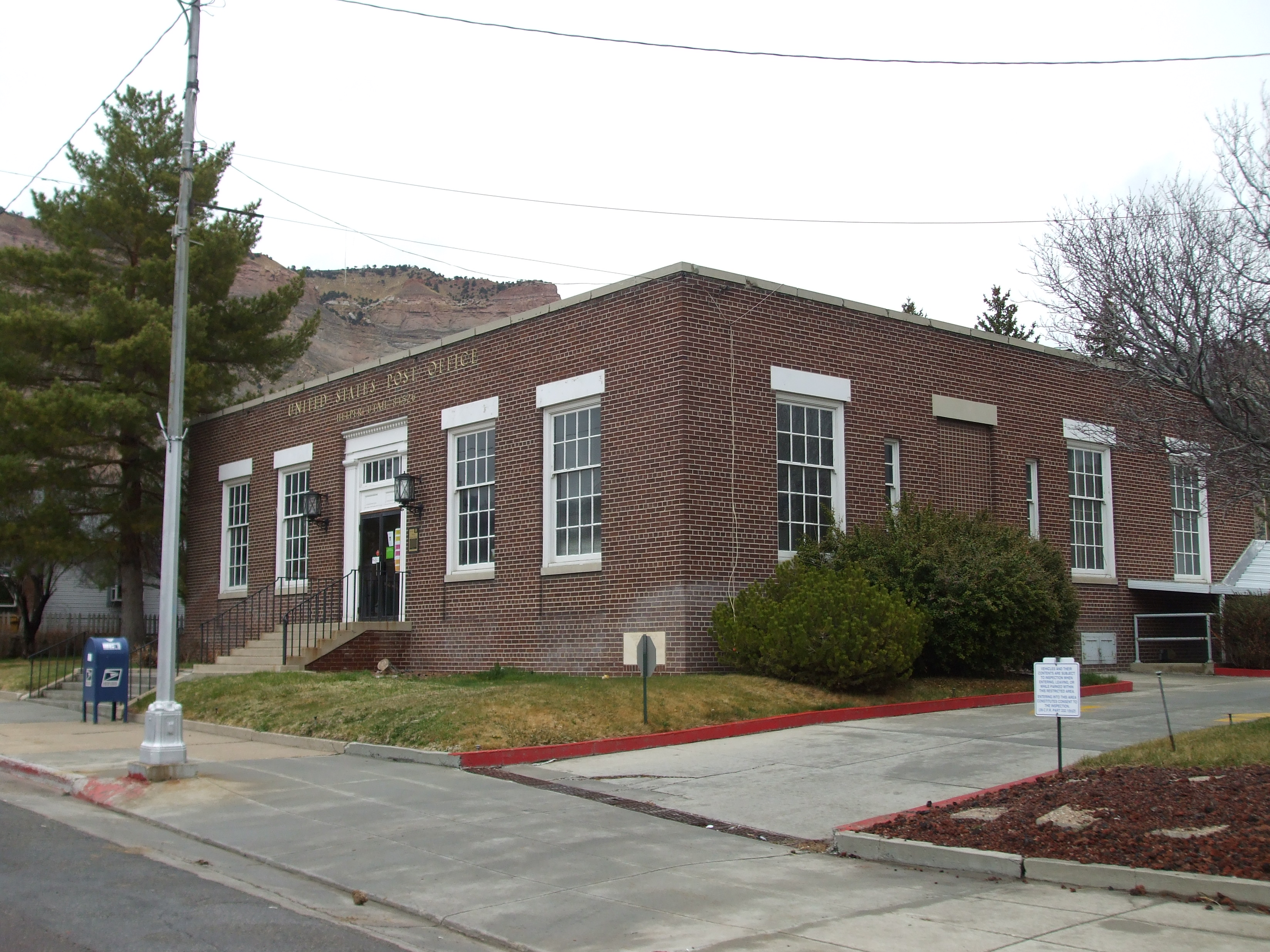

- Location within Utah Location within the United States
- Location: 45 S. Main, Helper, Utah
- Coordinates: 39°41′12″N 110°51′13″W
- Area: 0.6 acres (0.24 ha)
- Built: 1938
- Built by: Magafan, Jenne
- Architect: Simon, Louis A.
- Architectural style: Classical Revival
- MPS: US Post Offices in Utah MPS
- NRHP reference No.: 89001995
- Added to NRHP: November 27, 1989

The U.S. Post Office-Helper Main at 45 S. Main in Helper, Utah was built in 1938. It has also been known as Helper Main Post Office. In 1989, it was listed as part of the National Register of Historic Places. The post office is located in the Helper Commercial District.

The office features a mural by an artist named Jenne Magafan.
