= Desolation Canyon =

Canyon in Utah, United States

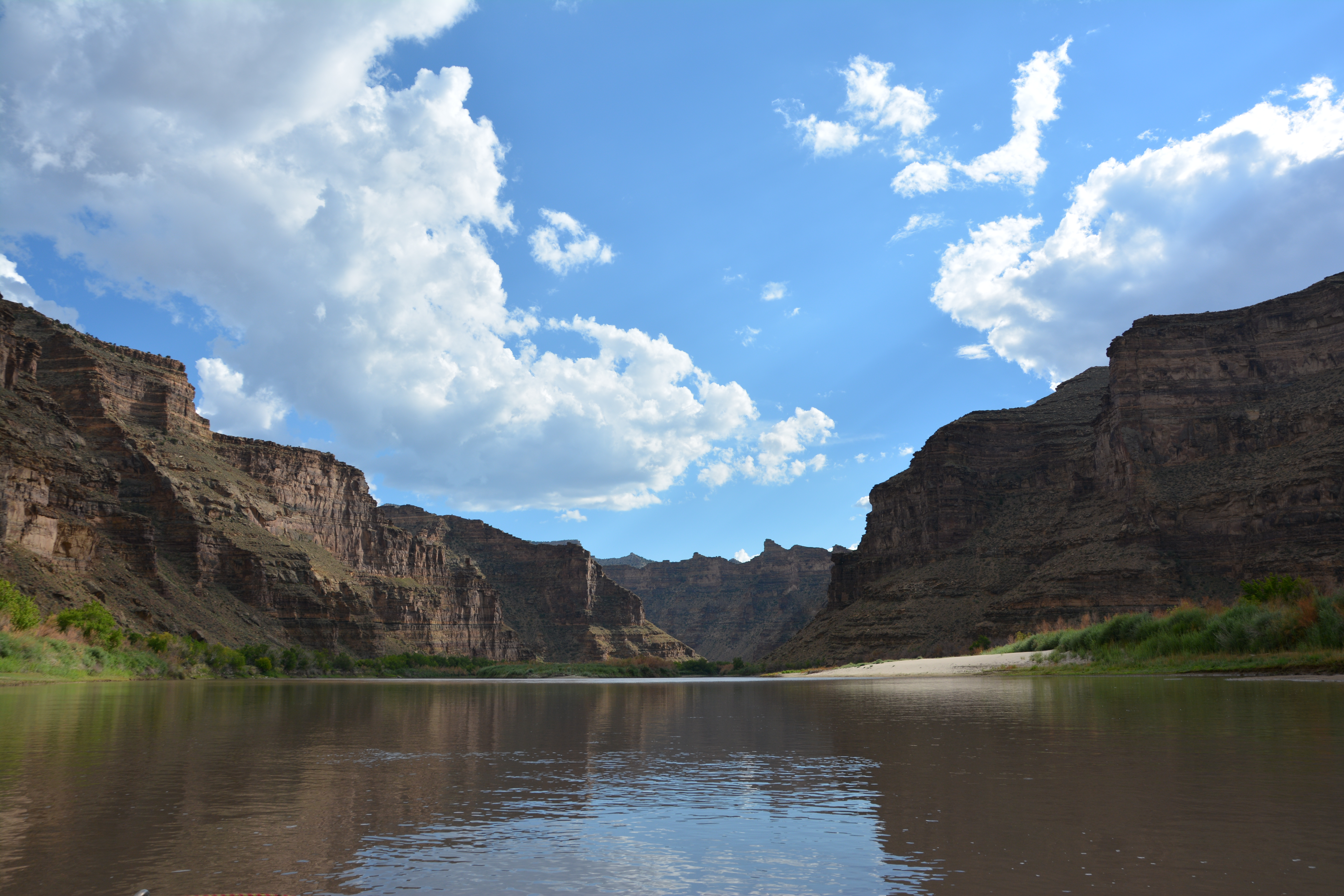
- Desolation Canyon and the Green River, August 2013
- Floor elevation: 4,318 feet (1,316 m)
- Long-axis direction: North-South

Geology
- Type: River valley

Geography
- Location: Green River in Carbon, Emery, Grand, and Uintah counties in Eastern Utah, United States
- Population centers: None (hence the name)
- Borders on: East Tavaputs Plateau (eastern); West Tavaputs Plateau (western)
- Coordinates: 39°25′00″N 110°00′40″W
- Traversed by: None
- Rivers: Green River
- Interactive map of Desolation Canyon
- Desolation Canyon
- U.S. National Register of Historic Places
- U.S. National Historic Landmark
- Location within Utah Location within the United States
- Location: Green River in Carbon, Emery, Grand, and Uintah counties in Eastern Utah, United States
- Nearest city: East Carbon, Utah
- Coordinates: 39°25′00″N 110°00′40″W
- NRHP reference No.: 68000057

Significant dates
- Added to NRHP: November 24, 1968
- Designated NHL: November 24, 1968

Desolation Canyon is a remote canyon on the Green River in eastern Utah, United States that is listed on the National Register of Historic Places (NRHP). It is said to be one of the most remote areas in the contiguous United States.

== Description ==
The canyon begins in southwestern Uintah County and then meanders roughly south along (and becomes) the county line between Uintah and Carbon counties (including the entire eastern border of Carbon County). Continuing its southerly meander, it then becomes the county line between Emery and Grand counties, until it reaches its mouth in the Roan Cliffs. (The Green River continues flowing south through Gray Canyon.) Desolation Canyon is situated between the West Tavaputs Plateau on the west and the East Tavaputs Plateau on the east. At its deepest point, a relief of over 5,000 feet (1,500 m) exists from river level to the unseen rim of the Tavaputs Plateau.

== History ==
Over the last few thousand years, different groups of humans have occupied the area and left their traces behind. Fremont and Ute pictographs and petroglyphs are abundant in Desolation Canyon and its numerous tributary canyons, such as Nine Mile and Range Creek. Fremont granaries, as well as several abandoned homesteaders' ranches, testify to the agricultural potential of riparian alluvial fans, which are larger in Desolation Canyon than in any other canyon of the Colorado - Green river system.

The canyon was traversed by John Wesley Powell in 1869 as part of an expedition that was sponsored by the Smithsonian Institution. Originally homesteaded by the Seamount family in 1914, Rock Creek Ranch is still used as a horse pasture by the ranches' contemporary owners, which makes it the last property in the canyon still commercially in use. Desolation Canyon was added to the NRHP and declared a National Historic Landmark in 1968 as part of the centennial celebration of the Powell expedition.

== Recreation ==
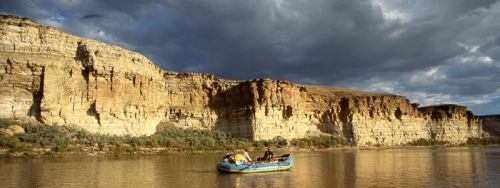
An undated BLM photograph of a boat on the Green River within Desolation Canyon

Each year during the spring, summer, and fall months, many boaters make the 83-mile (134 km) trip through Desolation and Gray canyons from Sand Wash to Swasey's Rapid, just upstream of the city of Green River. This section is managed by the Price office of the Bureau of Land Management, which issues permits. An additional permit must be obtained to camp or hike on the eastern side of the river, which is part of the Uintah and Ouray Indian Reservation for most of the canyon's length. As of spring 2015, the Utes are no longer offering permits to non-tribal members. Over 60 named class two and three rapids challenge boaters, and the gradual increase in size and difficulty of rapids make it an ideal place for beginner to intermediate boaters to develop their skills. At high water (over 20,000 cubic feet per second [570 m^{3}/s]), Joe Hutch Canyon Rapid (Cow Swim) approaches a class IV difficulty. Rapids in the canyon are big enough to swamp an open canoe at any water level.

== See also ==
- List of canyons and gorges in Utah
- List of National Historic Landmarks in Utah
- National Register of Historic Places listings in Carbon County, Utah
- National Register of Historic Places listings in Emery County, Utah
- National Register of Historic Places listings in Grand County, Utah
- National Register of Historic Places listings in Uintah County, Utah
