= Wellington, Utah =

City in Utah, United States

- City
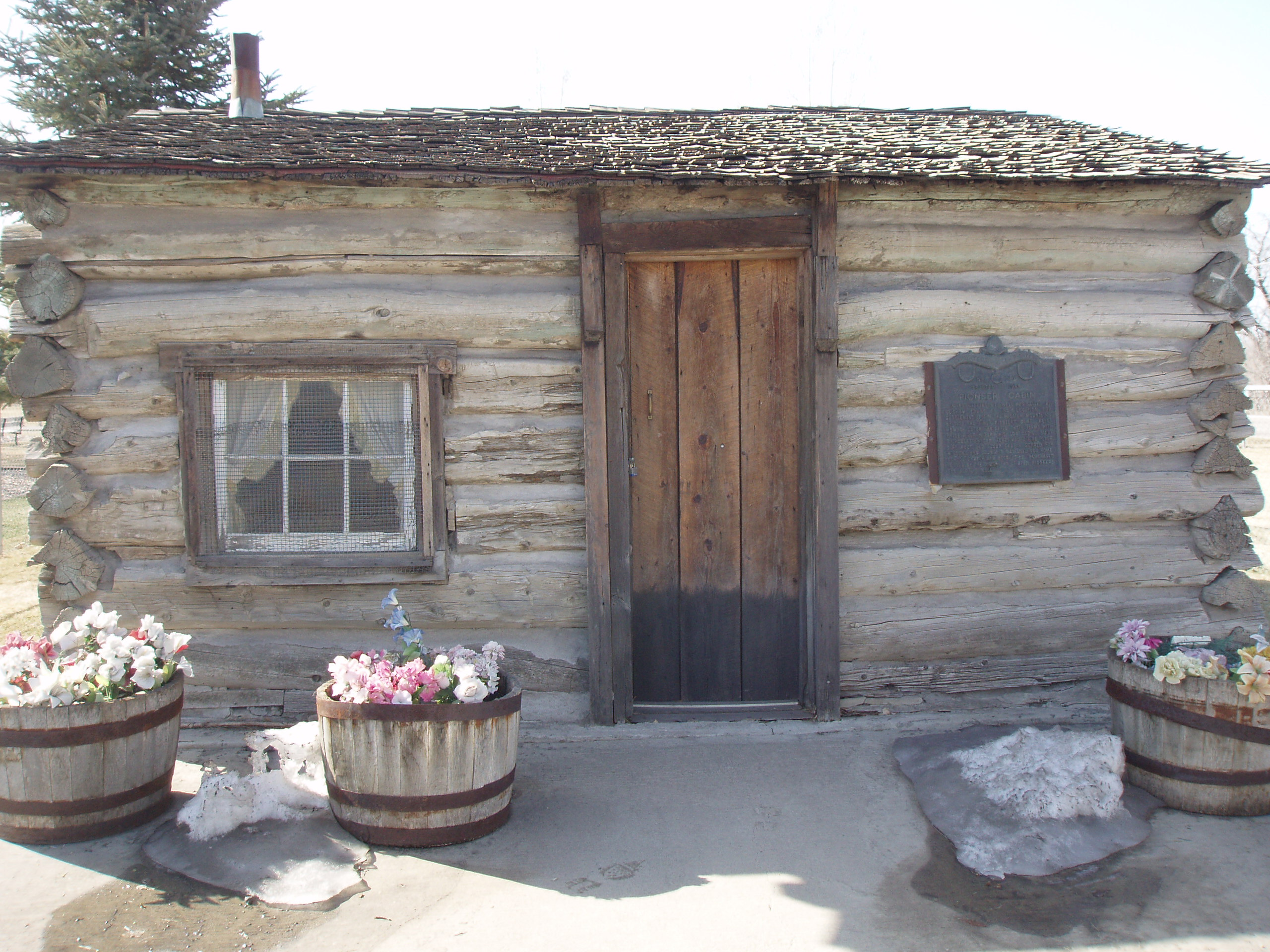
- Historical cabin in Wellington City Park, built 1882

- Location in Carbon County and the state of Utah

- Location of Utah in the United States
- Coordinates: 39°31′50″N 110°44′47″W
- Country: United States
- State: Utah
- County: Carbon
- Settled: 1878
- Founder: Jefferson Tidwell
- Named for: Justus Wellington Seeley, Jr.

Area
  - Total: 5.12 sq mi (13.25 km^{2})
  - Land: 5.12 sq mi (13.25 km^{2})
  - Water: 0 sq mi (0.00 km^{2})
- Elevation: 5,387 ft (1,642 m)

Population (2020)
  - Total: 1,605
  - Density: 316.8/sq mi (122.31/km^{2})
- Time zone: UTC-7 (Mountain (MST))
  - Summer (DST): UTC-6 (MDT)
- ZIP code: 84542
- Area code: 435
- FIPS code: 49-82510
- GNIS feature ID: 2412208
- Website: www.wellingtonutah.gov

Wellington is a city in Carbon County, Utah, United States. The population was 1,605 at the 2020 census. The community was settled in 1878 by a band of thirteen Mormons led by Jefferson Tidwell. The town was named for Justus Wellington Seeley, Jr., of the Emery County Court. Many residents commute to nearby Price for their jobs, or work in one of the various coal mines in the area.

== Geography ==
Wellington is located southwest of the center of Carbon County along U.S. routes 6/191, which leads northwest 6 miles (10 km) to Price, the county seat, and southeast 57 miles (92 km) to Green River.

According to the United States Census Bureau, the city has a total area of 5.1 square miles (13.3 km^{2}), all land. It is just north of the Price River, a southeast-flowing tributary of the Green River.

=== Climate ===
This climatic region is typified by large seasonal temperature differences, with warm to hot (and often humid) summers and cold (sometimes severely cold) winters. According to the Köppen Climate Classification system, Wellington has a humid continental climate, abbreviated "Dfb" on climate maps.

== Demographics ==
Historical population
Census	Pop.	Note	%±
1900	311		—
1910	358		15.1%
1920	361		0.8%
1930	348		−3.6%
1940	674		93.7%
1950	845		25.4%
1960	1,066		26.2%
1970	922		−13.5%
1980	1,406		52.5%
1990	1,632		16.1%
2000	1,666		2.1%
2010	1,676		0.6%
2020	1,605		−4.2%
U.S. Decennial Census

=== 2020 census ===
As of the 2020 census, Wellington had a population of 1,605. The median age was 36.1 years. 25.5% of residents were under the age of 18 and 16.6% of residents were 65 years of age or older. For every 100 females there were 97.9 males, and for every 100 females age 18 and over there were 90.4 males age 18 and over.

0.0% of residents lived in urban areas, while 100.0% lived in rural areas.

There were 621 households in Wellington, of which 35.6% had children under the age of 18 living in them. Of all households, 53.0% were married-couple households, 16.6% were households with a male householder and no spouse or partner present, and 23.8% were households with a female householder and no spouse or partner present. About 23.9% of all households were made up of individuals and 9.5% had someone living alone who was 65 years of age or older.

There were 698 housing units, of which 11.0% were vacant. The homeowner vacancy rate was 1.8% and the rental vacancy rate was 12.8%.

Racial composition as of the 2020 census
Race	Number	Percent
White	1,383	86.2%
Black or African American	7	0.4%
American Indian and Alaska Native	19	1.2%
Asian	5	0.3%
Native Hawaiian and Other Pacific Islander	0	0.0%
Some other race	88	5.5%
Two or more races	103	6.4%
Hispanic or Latino (of any race)	206	12.8%

=== 2000 census ===
As of the census of 2000, there were 1,666 people, 576 households, and 459 families residing in the city. The population density was 473.9 people per square mile (182.7/km^{2}). There were 661 housing units at an average density of 188.0 per square mile (72.5/km^{2}). The racial makeup of the city was 94.72% White, 0.12% African American, 1.08% Native American, 0.18% Asian, 0.12% Pacific Islander, 2.04% from other races, and 1.74% from two or more races. Hispanic or Latino of any race were 4.92% of the population.

There were 576 households, out of which 47.2% had children under the age of 18 living with them, 62.3% were married couples living together, 13.0% had a female householder with no husband present, and 20.3% were non-families. 17.9% of all households were made up of individuals, and 6.9% had someone living alone who was 65 years of age or older. The average household size was 2.89 and the average family size was 3.27.

In the city, the population was spread out, with 33.3% under the age of 18, 13.1% from 18 to 24, 25.1% from 25 to 44, 19.9% from 45 to 64, and 8.7% who were 65 years of age or older. The median age was 28 years. For every 100 females, there were 96.2 males. For every 100 females age 18 and over, there were 91.4 males.

The median income for a household in the city was $36,979, and the median income for a family was $40,521. Males had a median income of $41,053 versus $17,167 for females. The per capita income for the city was $14,721. About 10.7% of families and 14.7% of the population were below the poverty line, including 20.6% of those under age 18 and 4.7% of those age 65 or over.

== Education ==
Wellington is located in the Carbon School District and is home to an elementary school. Students attend middle school and Carbon High School in Price.

== See also ==
- List of cities and towns in Utah
