= List of Denver and Rio Grande Western Railroad lines =

The following rail lines have been owned or operated by the Denver and Rio Grande Western Railroad or its predecessors.

Denver-Pueblo Joint Line: Denver (Union Station) to Pueblo

- Fort Logan Branch: Englewood (Military Junction) to Fort Logan
- Lehigh Branch: Louviers (Lehigh Junction) to Lehigh Mine
- Castle Rock Branch: Castle Rock to Hathaway
  - O'Brien's Quarry Spur: Hathaway to O'Brien's Quarry
- Douglas Quarry Spur: Douglas to Madge Quarry
- Manitou Branch: Colorado Springs (Manitou Junction) to Manitou

Royal Gorge Line: Pueblo to Salida via Royal Gorge

- Coal Creek Branch: Florence to Coal Creek
- Oak Creek Branch: Florence (Oak Creek Junction) to Oak Creek
- Chandler Creek Branch: Chandler Junction to Chandler Mine
  - Fremont Branch: Fremont Junction to Fremont Mine
- Grape Creek Branch: Cañon City (Grape Creek Junction) to Westcliffe
- Westcliffe Branch: Texas Creek to Westcliffe
- Howard Branch: Howard's Quarry Junction to Calcite

Tennessee Pass Line: Salida to Grand Junction via Tennessee Pass

- Calumet Branch: Brown Canon (Hecla Junction) to Calumet
- Leadville Branch: Malta to Leadville
  - California Gulch Branch: Oro Junction to Rowe Mill
  - Ibex Branch: Leadville to Ibex
    - Graham Park Branch: Graham Park Junction to Tucson
  - Blue River Branch: Leadville to Dillon
- Ryan Cut-Off: Leadville Junction to Leadville (Leadville Branch)
- Aspen Branch: Glenwood Springs to Aspen

Gunnison Line: Salida to Grand Junction via Marshall Pass and Black Canyon

- Monarch Branch: Poncha Junction to Monarch
- Mears Junction-Alamosa Line: Mears Junction to Alamosa
  - Orient Branch: Villa Grove to Orient
  - Crestone Branch: Moffat to Cottonwood
- Pitkin Branch: Parlin to Quartz
- Crested Butte Branch: Gunnison to Anthracite
  - Ruby-Anthracite Branch: Crested Butte to Floresta
- Baldwin Branch: Gunnison to Baldwin
  - Kubler Branch: Castleton to Kubler
- Aberdeen Branch: Gunnison (Aberdeen Junction) to Aberdeen Quarry
- Lake City Branch: Sapinero to Lake City
- Ouray Branch: Montrose to Ouray
- North Fork Branch: Delta (North Fork Junction) to Oliver

Utah Division: Grand Junction to Ogden

- Ballard and Thompson Railroad: Thompson to Sego
- Cane Creek Branch: Brendel to Potash
- Sunnyside Branch: Mounds to Sunnyside
- Spring Canyon Branch: Helper (Spring Canyon Junction) to Mutual
- Kenilworth Branch: Helper (Kenilworth Junction) to Kenilworth
- Jennings and Potter's Quarry Branch: Kyune (Jennings Junction) to quarries
- Pleasant Valley Branch: Colton to Clear Creek
  - Winter Quarters Spur: Scofield to Winter Quarters
- Marysvale Branch: Thistle to Marysvale
  - San Pete Valley Branch: Ephraim to Nephi
    - Morrison Branch: Ephraim to Morrison
    - Castle Valley Branch: Salina to Nioche
- Tintic Branch: Springville to Silver City
  - Goshen Valley Branch: Pearl to Dividend and Iron King
  - Mammoth Spur: Mammoth Junction to Mammoth Mill
- Provo Canyon Branch: Provo to Heber City
- Orem Branch: Provo (Provo Junction) to Orem
- Bingham Branch: Midvale to Bingham
  - Garfield Beach Extension: Welby to Garfield
  - Dalton and Lark Spur: Dalton to Lark
  - Bingham Branch Extension: Loline Junction to Cuprum
    - Copper Belt Branch: Bingham (Copper Belt Junction) to Montana-Bingham
      - Copper Belt-Carr Fork Branch: Yampa Mine Connection to Yampa Mine
- Little Cottonwood Branch: Midvale to Wasatch
- Park City Branch: Roper Junction to Park City
- Lake Park Branch: Farmington (Lake Park Junction) to Lake Park
- Hooper Branch: Roy to Cox

Pueblo–Alamosa line: Pueblo to Alamosa

- Old Main Line: Minnequa (Sonora Junction) to Trinidad; branch from Cuchara Junction to Walsenburg (Walsenburg Junction)
  - Rouse Branch: Rouse Junction to Rouse (later began at Mayne and then Monson on the C&S trackage rights)
    - Old Rouse Branch: Old Rouse Junction to Old Rouse Mines
  - Engleville Branch: Engleville Junction to Engleville
- Zinc Smelter Spur: Minnequa (Zinc Junction) to Blende
- Capers Branch: Mustang to Capers (including part of the Old Main Line near Capers)
- Colorado and Southern Railway trackage rights: Walsenburg to Longsdale Junction
  - Reilly Canon Branch: Longsdale Junction to Boncarbo
- Loma Branch: Walsenburg (Loma Junction) to Alamo
  - New Pacific Mine Spur: Pictou (New Pacific Junction) to New Pacific Mine
- Reliance Branch: La Veta (Reliance Junction) to Ojo
- Tropic Spur: La Veta (Tropic Junction) to Tropic
- Creede Branch: Alamosa to Creede

Alamosa–Durango line (San Juan Extension): Alamosa to Durango

- Santa Fe Branch: Antonito to Santa Fe
  - La Madera Branch: Taos Junction to La Madera
- Chama Lumber Spur: Chama (Biggs Junction) to Tierra Amarilla
- Pagosa Springs Branch: Gato (Pagosa Junction) to Pagosa Springs
- Rio Grande and Southwestern Railroad: Lumberton to Gallinas
- Farmington Branch: Carbon Junction to Farmington
- Silverton Branch: Durango to Silverton

Moffat Line: Denver (Union Station) to Dotsero (Tennessee Pass Line) via Moffat Tunnel

- Corona Line: Newcomb to Vasquez (old line over Corona Pass; abandoned when Moffat Tunnel opened)
- Craig Branch: Bond (Orestod) to Craig
  - Energy Spur: Hitchens to Energy

Rio Grande Southern Railroad: Ridgway (Ouray Branch) to Durango

- Telluride Branch: Vance Junction to Pandora
