= Helen Z. Papanikolas =

American novelist

- Born: June 29, 1917; Cameron, Utah, U.S.
- Died: October 31, 2004 (aged 87)
- Education: University of Utah (BA)
- Occupations: Novelist and folklorist
- Known for: Documenting Greek-American and immigrant life in Utah and the American West
- Notable work: Toil and Rage in a New Land: The Greek Immigrants of Utah; The Peoples of Utah; The Time of the Little Black Bird
- Board member of: Founder and first president of The Peoples of Utah Institute; Advisory Board, Utah Historical Quarterly; Board of State History; Utah Endowment for the Humanities State Committee
- Spouse: Nick E. Papanikolas
- Children: 2 (Zeese and Thalia)
- Awards: Utah Fiction Prize; 2000 The Time of the Little Black Bird

Helen Zeese Papanikolas (June 29, 1917 – October 31, 2004) was a Greek-American ethnic historian, novelist and folklorist who documented the immigrant experience in Utah and the American West through histories, memoirs, fiction, and poetry. Her ethnographic themes drew upon her experience as a Greek-American in a small western community.

== Biography ==
Helen Zeese was born in the mining community of Cameron (near Castle Gate) in Carbon County, Utah, to Greek immigrant parents George and Emily Zeese (originally Yiorgis and Emilia Zisimopoulos). The family moved to nearby Helper and, in 1933, to Salt Lake City, Utah where they established a chain of grocery stores. In her youth, Zeese attended Helper Central School and Carbon High School while living in Carbon County, and East High School in Salt Lake City.

While attending the University of Utah, Zeese served as editor of the campus literary magazine Pen and associated with several other students who would become prominent in the field of western history. These included historian and archivist Dale Morgan. She graduated with a Bachelor of Arts from the university in 1939. She married Nick E. Papanikolas and the couple had two children, Zeese and Thalia.

In 1984, the University of Utah awarded Papanikolas an honorary doctorate. She and her husband established scholarship programs for minority students at the University of Utah and the College of Eastern Utah. Papanikolas died in November 2004.

== Career and cultural contributions ==
In 1950, Papanikolas was asked to write about Greek communities for the Utah Historical Quarterly. The subsequent 1954 article The Greeks of Carbon County broadened the scope of published Utah history, which had previously focused on settlement and progress of the administration and membership of the Church of Jesus Christ of Latter-day Saints. The article contributed to a fuller understanding of Utah's cultural and ethnic heritage and served as a lasting example for local ethnic historians. For fifty years, her works on ethnic history were published in the Utah Historical Quarterly and Western Humanities Review. She wrote seven books, both fiction and non-fiction. Publications also include historical monographs and anthologies such as Toil and Rage in a New Land: The Greek Immigrants of Utah (1970) and The Peoples of Utah (1976). Papanikolas' skill as a novelist and storyteller was demonstrated in The Time of the Little Black Bird, which won the Utah Fiction Prize for 2000.

During her research, Papanikolas collected numerous primary documents and conducted extensive interviews with immigrants and historians. She was instrumental in organizing and contributing to an ethnic archive at the Oral History Archives, Marriott Library, University of Utah. Selected papers are also held in The Helen Z. Papanikolas Oral Histories Collection, 1969–1974, Utah State Historical Society, in Salt Lake City and in the Immigration History Research Center, College of Liberal Arts, at the University of Minnesota. Her years of fieldwork and extensive archival work on Greek America led to Papanikolas’ reputation as a leading authority on Greek immigrant life in the United States. She presented papers at national and international conferences and served as a consultant for television documentaries and other projects.

In 1977, Papanikolas was a founder and first president of The Peoples of Utah Institute. As president, she located and identified artifacts associated with ethnic life, produced a major museum exhibit, and sponsored lectures and other programs. Her efforts at the institute led to the establishment of the Hellenic Cultural Museum in Salt Lake City. She also served on the Children's Service Society Board (1962–69); Advisory Board of Editors, Utah Historical Quarterly (1969–73); Board of State History (1973–85); and Utah Endowment for the Humanities State Committee (1973–79).

== Awards ==
Awards for her contribution to cultural history include: :

- Archbishop of the Americas Iakovos Saint Paul Medal (1972);
- Fellow of the Utah State Historical Society (1975);
- Japanese-American Citizens League Award (1976);
- Brotherhood Award, National Conference of Christians and Jews, Utah Chapter (1978);
- Distinguished Alumna Award, University of Utah (1983); and
- Honorary Doctor of Humane Letters, University of Utah (1984).

== Bibliography ==
- Helen Papanikolas (1974). Toil and Rage in a New Land: The Greek Immigrants in Utah. Utah State Historical Society.
- Helen Papanikolas (1996). The Apple Falls From the Apple Tree: stories. Swallow Press. ISBN 978-0-8040-0993-5.
- Helen Papanikolas (1997). A Greek Odyssey in the American West. University of Nebraska Press. ISBN 978-0-8032-8747-1.
- Helen Papanikolas (2002). An Amulet of Greek Earth: generations of immigrant folk culture. Swallow Press. ISBN 978-0-8040-1037-5.
- Helen Papanikolas (2005). Rain in the Valley: A Novel. Utah State University Press. ISBN 978-0-87421-630-1.
