= Spring Canyon, Utah =

Spring Canyon
- Ghost town
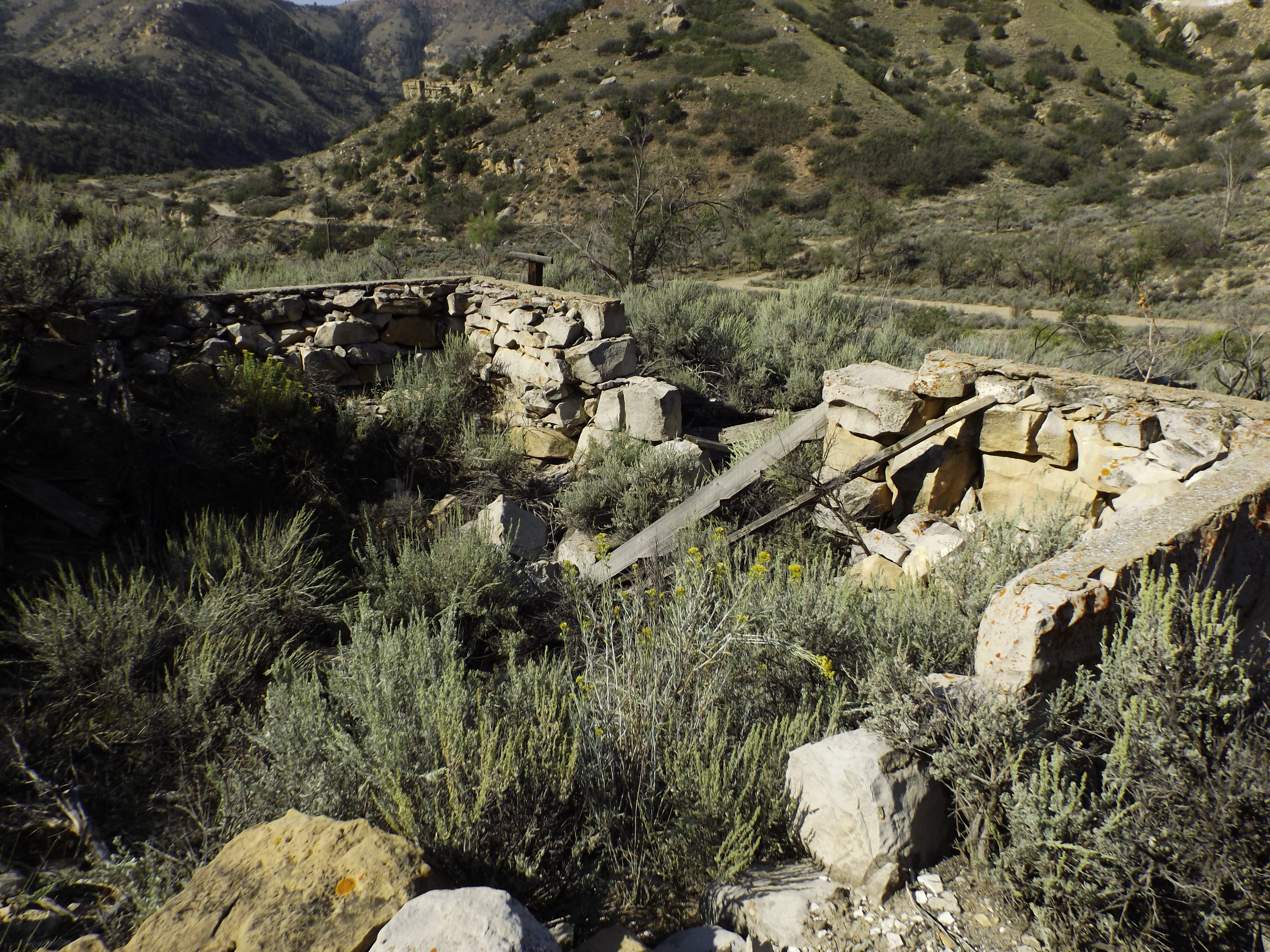
- Ruin in Spring Canyon

- Location within Utah Location within the United States
- Coordinates: 39°42′14″N 110°55′11″W
- Country: United States
- State: Utah
- County: Carbon
- Founded: 1912
- Abandoned: 1969
- Named for: The canyon of the same name
- Elevation: 6,634 ft (2,022 m)
- GNIS feature ID: 1437694

Spring Canyon, also called Storrs, is a ghost town in Carbon County, Utah, United States. In 1912, Jesse Knight purchased 1,600 acres of coal land and began developing a mine and a company town. Knight named the town Storrs, after the mine superintendent. The name of the town was changed to Spring Canyon in 1924. 1,000 tons of coal per day were mined from 1924 to 1943, and during World War II, coal production peaked at 2,000 tons of coal per day. By 1946, the need for coal diminished, and people began to leave. By 1969, Spring Canyon was abandoned.

== History ==
Prior to the establishment of Spring Canyon, residents in Helper mined coal from a small opening on the side of the mountain. In 1895, Teancum Pratt constructed a wagon road in order to make coal transportation easier. In 1912, Jesse Knight purchased 1,600 acres of land west of Helper, organized the Spring Canyon Coal Company, and constructed sixty homes. Knight also constructed a railroad in 1913 to the Denver and Rio Grande Western Railroad line in Helper. Knight named the new town Storrs, after the mine superintendent George Storrs. Because Knight was a Mormon, he banned saloons and gambling houses from being constructed in the town. In 1914, a schoolhouse and a church were constructed for the townspeople, who were mostly members of the LDS Church. By the end of 1914, 1,000 tons of coal per day were being shipped.

By 1924, Storrs had 1,000 residents, a hotel, a heated swimming pool, and well-built houses, offices, and stores. At this time, George Storrs was charged with mail fraud, and the town's name was officially changed to Spring Canyon. From 1924 to 1943, 1,000 tons of coal per day were mined, and in 1940, the Spring Canyon mine was ranked as the fourth largest coal producer in Utah. During World War II, 2,000 tons of coal per day were being mined. By 1946, the Spring Canyon mine had transported and mined eleven million tons of coal, and by 1948, the Spring Canyon Coal Company was also operating the mines in Standardville and Royal. However, the need for coal began to diminish, and by 1954, only a small group of miners remained in Spring Canyon. The mine closed in 1969 due to low production and increasingly high costs. Only three families were living in Spring Canyon in 1969, and by the end of the year, Spring Canyon was abandoned. When the mine first closed in 1969 and the town's residents relocated, few buildings were removed. The Spring Canyon Hotel, most of the homes, and the mine offices were left. However, in 1975, every building in Spring Canyon's business district was demolished. The railroad trestle and the ruins of the residential section of town are the only remnants of the former coal mining town.

== See also ==
- Coal mining in the United States
- List of ghost towns in Utah
