= Latuda, Utah =

- Unincorporated community
- Location within Utah Location within the United States
- Coordinates: 39°42′13.87″N 110°56′45.59″W
- Country: United States
- State: Utah
- County: Carbon
- Time zone: UTC-7 (Mountain (MST))
  - Summer (DST): UTC-6 (MDT)
- GNIS feature ID: 1437619

Latuda is a ghost town in Carbon County, Utah, United States.

== History ==
The settlement began when Francisco Latuda and Charles Picco purchased approximately 326 acres of coal-bearing land on 1 August 1917. They then began to develop the Liberty mine and to set up the Liberty Fuel Company.

The first shipment of coal took place in 1918.

By the mid-1940s, production had begun to decline, and by 1954, the company had already wound up most of its operations.

== Geography ==
Latuda was situated about seven miles from the mouth of Spring Canyon, in Helper.

A post office operated from 1920 to 1958.

== Demography ==
The town had nearly 400 residents, but by 1967, there was no one left.

== See also ==
- List of ghost towns in Utah
