= Hale, Utah =

Ghost town in Carbon County, Utah, US

Coordinates: 39°47′14″N 111°06′29″W

Location of Hale in Utah

Hale is a ghost town in Carbon County, Utah. The site lies just to the east of Scofield Reservoir, at an elevation of 7,598 feet (2,316 meters). The reservoir covers the upper part of town. Like the other nearby towns of Scofield and Winter Quarters, Utah, Hale was a coal mining camp.
