= Eureka Lilly Headframe =

- U.S. National Register of Historic Places
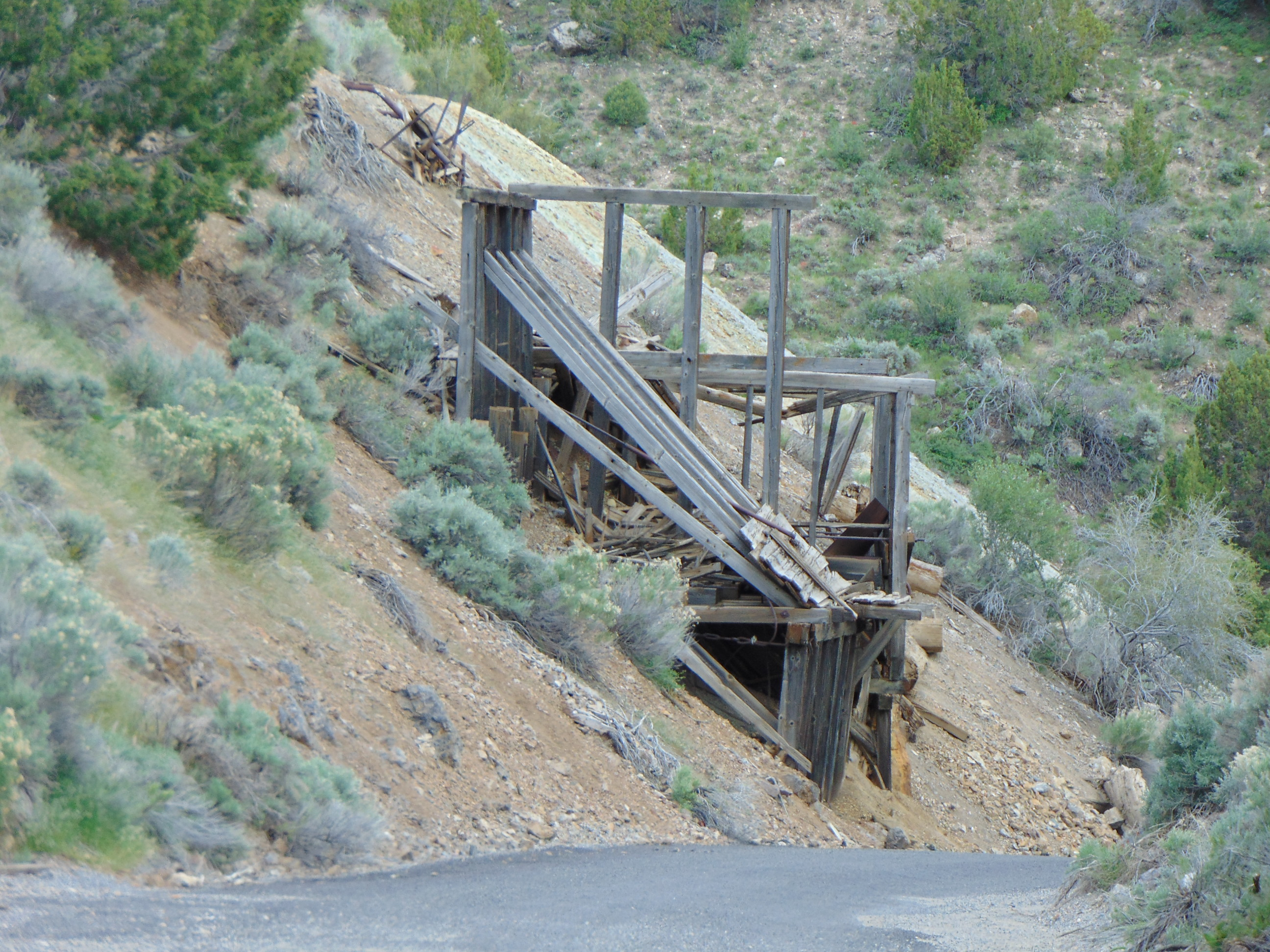
- Looking south along Dividend Road (formerly SR-159) at the Eureka Lilly Headframe, May 2016

- Location within Utah Location within the United States
- Location: Dividend, Utah; United States
- Nearest city: Eureka
- Coordinates: 39°57′09″N 112°04′07″W
- Area: less than one acre
- MPS: Tintic Mining District MRA
- NRHP reference No.: 79003487
- Added to NRHP: March 14, 1979

The Eureka Lilly Headframe is the surviving headframe at the Eureka Lilly mine in the Tintic Mining District in Dividend, Utah, United States, and is listed on the National Register of Historic Places.

== Description ==
The headframe is a "wood four-post type headframe with one sheave instead of two. . . and stands twenty-five feet [7.6 m] high. . . ." It is the only four post headframe of its type within the Tintic Mining District. The headframe is located just east of Dividend Road (formerly Utah State Route 159), about 3 miles (4.8 km) east of Eureka. (Some of the additional framework of the mine extends down the slope and west to the edge of Dividend Road.)

From 1909 to 1949 the mine produced primarily gold, lead, silver, and zinc, but also copper and bismuth and even some manganese and arsenic.

The headframe was listed on the National Register of Historic Places on March 14, 1979. At the time of NRHP listing it was owned by Kennecott Copper Corporation.

== See also ==
- National Register of Historic Places listings in Utah County, Utah
