= Winter Quarters =

Winter Quarters may refer to:

- Winter Quarters (North Omaha, Nebraska), an 1846-1847 Latter-day Saints encampment
  - Winter Quarters Nebraska Temple, an LDS Church temple operating since 2001 at the encampment site
- Winter Quarters, Utah, a former mining town (1875–1930)
- Winter Quarters State Historic Site, an antebellum plantation in Louisiana
- Wallace Circus and American Circus Corporation Winter Quarters, Peru, Indiana, listed on the NRHP in Indiana
- Cantonment, the establishment of temporary military encampments during winter
