= Western Mining and Railroad Museum =

Museum in Utah

Coordinates: 39°41′07″N 110°51′18″W

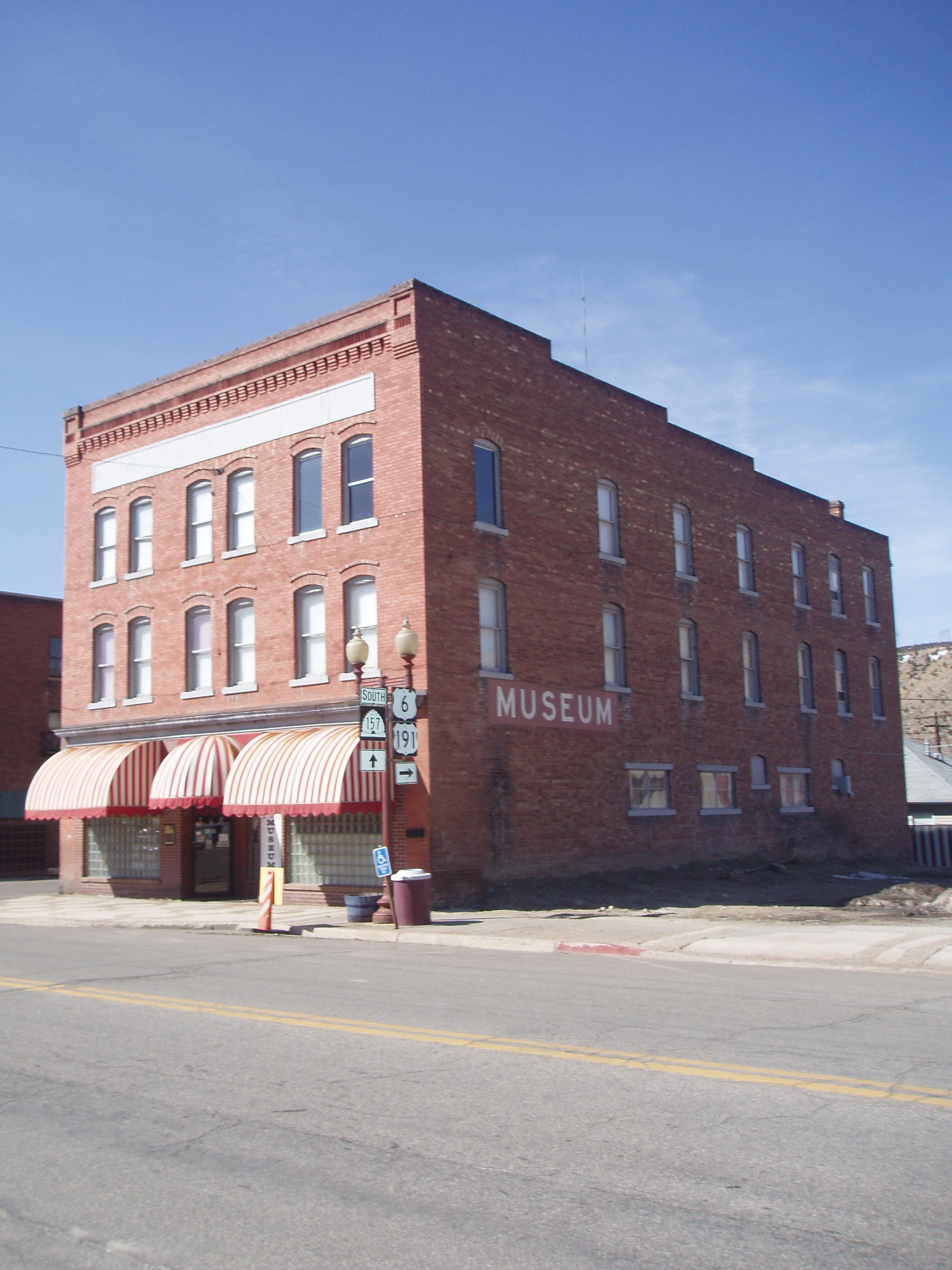
The old Helper Hotel building, current home of the museum (prior to the addition of the northern wing), March 2008

The Western Mining and Railroad Museum is a railroad museum and mining museum located in Helper, Utah, United States, 120 miles (190 km) southeast of Salt Lake City.

The museum is housed in the Old Helper Hotel building, built in 1913–1914. The museum was started in 1964. Teancum Pratt was Helper's initial settler in the 1800s. After the Denver and Rio Grande Western Railway arrived in Helper, it began to become a popular town in the 1880s. Helper later became the eastern and western union station. Because of this, Helper grew bigger by adding hotels and other buildings for those passing through. As Helper continued to grow, the town gained saloons, a grocery store, a clothing store, and a school. Helper also grew in ethnic diversity in 1890. Mining and railroad work brought the need of unskilled labor. As a result, many people of different races and backgrounds came to work in Helper. Chinese, Italian and Austrians were the most common immigrants that worked in Helper. Because the town had neutral stance on labor, more and more immigrants came and populated the area. It was a place of safety for union organizers and strikers. The Western Mining and Railroad Museum contains tools and equipment that were used by the workers in the mines and on the railroads.
