= Carbon County, Utah =

County in Utah, United States

- County
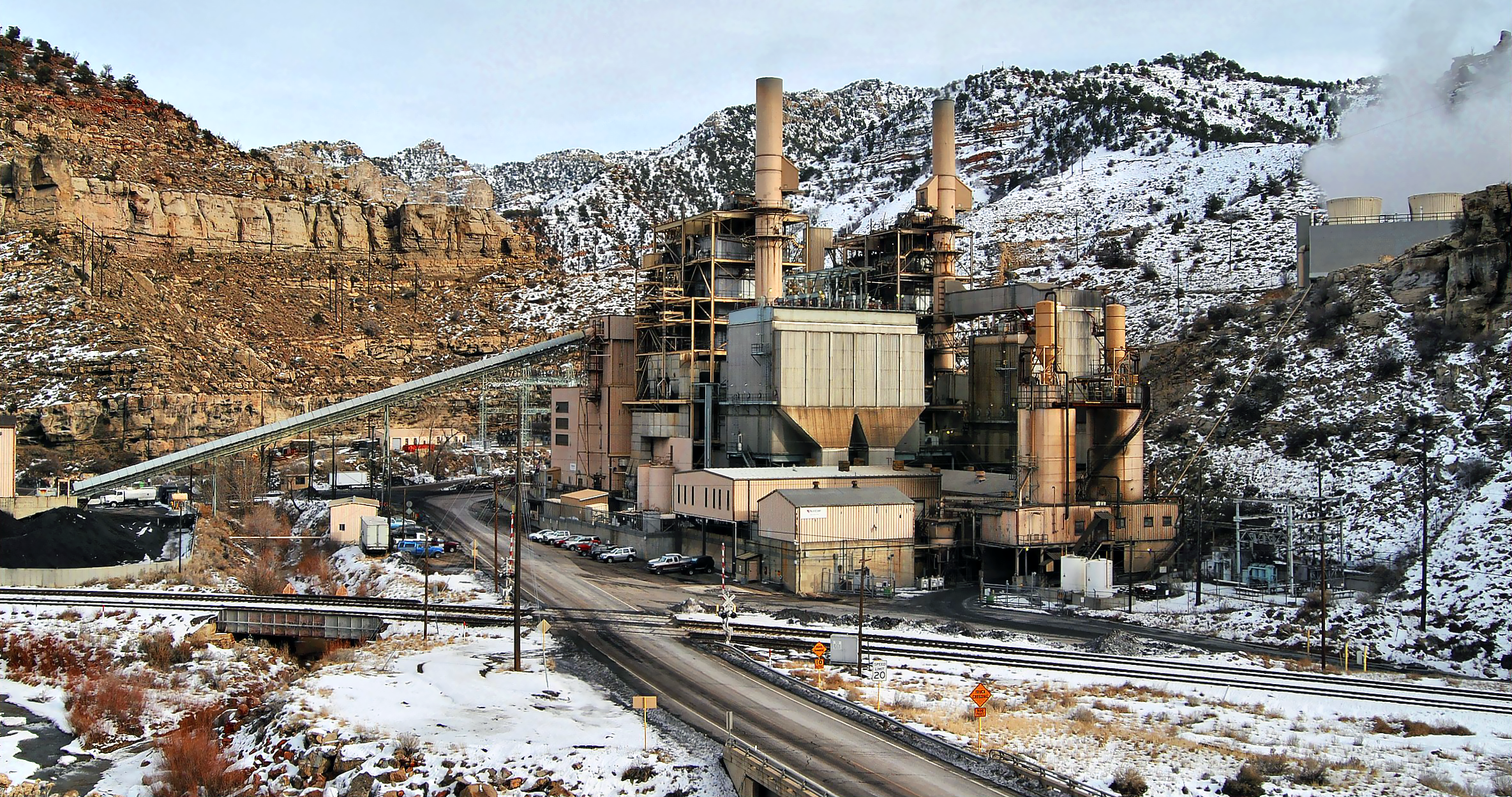
- Carbon Power Plant at Castle Gate, Utah demolished in 2016

- Location within the U.S. state of Utah
- Coordinates: 39.64°N 110.58°W
- Country: United States
- State: Utah
- Founded: March 8, 1894
- Named for: Abundant coal deposits
- Seat: Price
- Largest city: Price

Area
  - Total: 1,485 sq mi (3,850 km^{2})
  - Land: 1,478 sq mi (3,830 km^{2})
  - Water: 6.1 sq mi (16 km^{2}) 0.4%

Population (2020)
  - Total: 20,412
  - Estimate (2025): 20,680 ▲
  - Density: 13.81/sq mi (5.332/km^{2})
- Time zone: UTC−7 (Mountain)
  - Summer (DST): UTC−6 (MDT)
- Congressional district: 3rd
- Website: www.carbon.utah.gov

Carbon County is a county in the U.S. state of Utah. As of the 2020 United States census, the population was 20,412. Its county seat and largest city is Price.

The Price, UT Micropolitan Statistical Area includes all of Carbon County.

== History ==
Carbon County was part of Emery County, founded in 1880. The demographics along the Price River changed with the construction of the Denver and Rio Grande Western Railroad in 1883 and the development of coal mines, largely in upper Emery, to fuel the railroad. The Utah Territory Legislature was petitioned to split off the north part, and thus it established Carbon County effective March 8, 1894. It was named for the element Carbon, to emphasize the industrial nature of the area.

Carbon County is the second-largest natural gas producer in Utah (after Uintah County), with 94 billion cubic feet produced in 2008.

== Geography ==
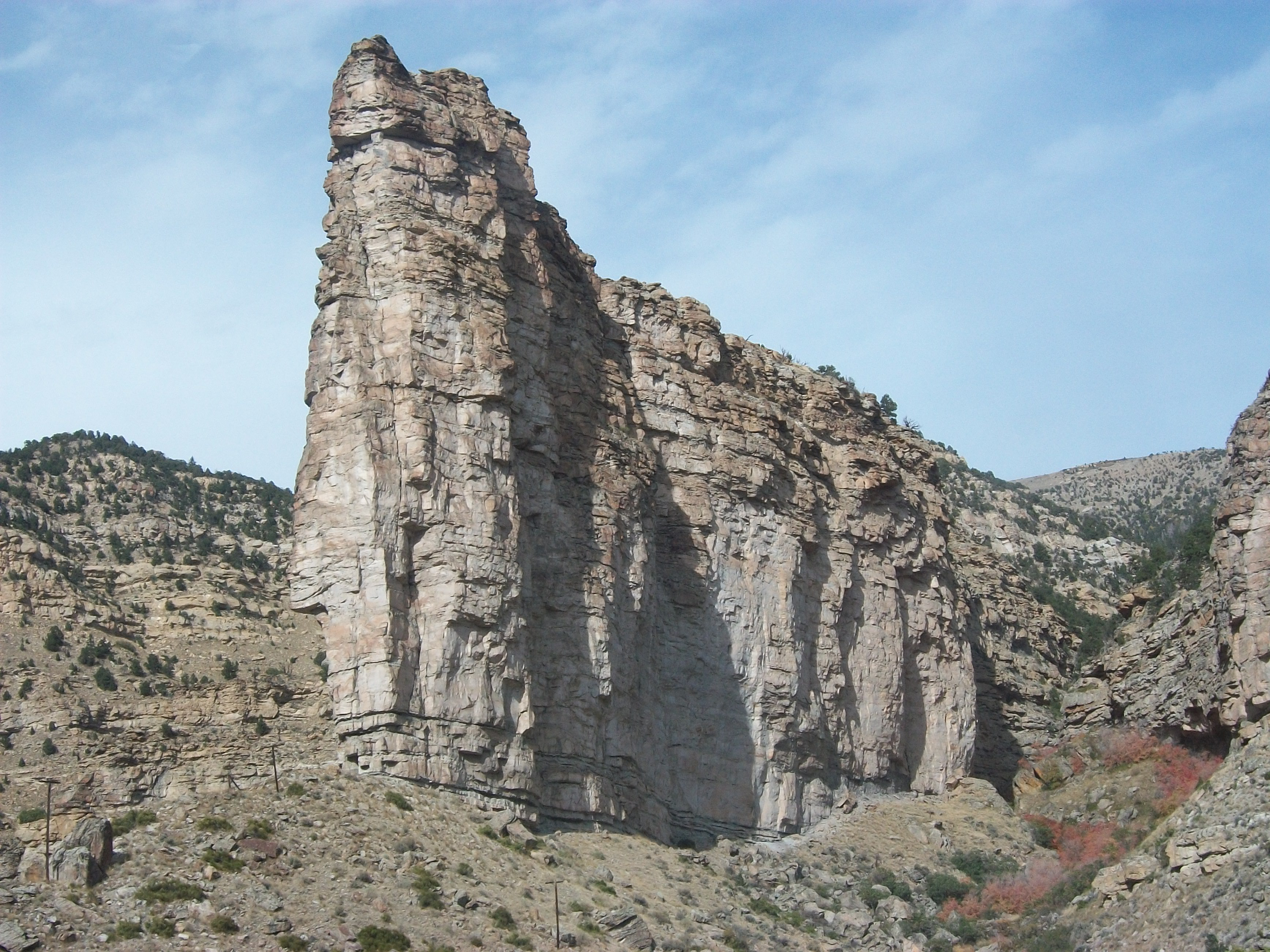
Castle Gate rock formation in Carbon County

The Green River flows south-southeastward along the county's eastern border. The lower central part of Carbon County is a continuation of Castle Valley in Emery County, but in Carbon, the valley is ringed with mountains - the Wasatch Range to the west and northwest, and the Book Cliffs to the north and northeast. The county generally slopes to the south and east; its highest point is Monument Peak on the crest of the Wasatch Mountains near the midpoint of the county's western border, at 10,452 ft (3,186 m) ASL. The county has a total area of 1,485 square miles (3,850 km^{2}), of which 1,478 square miles (3,830 km^{2}) is land and 6.1 square miles (16 km^{2}) (0.4%) is water.

=== Airports ===
- Carbon County Regional Airport (PUC) - Price

=== Major highways ===
- U.S. Routes 6/191
- Utah State Route 10
- Utah State Route 96
- Utah State Route 122
- Utah State Route 123
- Utah State Route 124
- Utah State Route 139
- Utah State Route 157

=== Adjacent counties ===
- Utah County - northwest
- Duchesne County - north
- Uintah County - east
- Emery County - south
- Sanpete County - west

=== Protected areas ===
- Gordon Creek Wildlife Management Area
- Manti National Forest (part)
- Price Canyon Recreation Area
- Scofield State Park

=== Lakes ===
- Grassy Trail Reservoir
- Scofield Lake

== Demographics ==
Historical population
Census	Pop.	Note	%±
1900	5,004		—
1910	8,624		72.3%
1920	15,489		79.6%
1930	17,798		14.9%
1940	18,459		3.7%
1950	24,901		34.9%
1960	21,135		−15.1%
1970	15,647		−26.0%
1980	22,179		41.7%
1990	20,228		−8.8%
2000	20,422		1.0%
2010	21,403		4.8%
2020	20,412		−4.6%
2025 (est.)	20,680	▲	1.3%
US Decennial Census; 1790–1960 1900–1990; 1990–2000 2010 2020

=== 2020 census ===
According to the 2020 United States census and 2020 American Community Survey, there were 20,412 people in Carbon County with a population density of 13.8 people per square mile (5.3/km^{2}). Among non-Hispanic or Latino people, the racial makeup was 16,645 (81.5%) White, 50 (0.2%) African American, 199 (1.0%) Native American, 63 (0.3%) Asian, 29 (0.1%) Pacific Islander, 58 (0.3%) from other races, and 691 (3.4%) from two or more races. 2,677 (13.1%) people were Hispanic or Latino.

Carbon County, Utah – Racial and ethnic composition Note: the US Census treats Hispanic/Latino as an ethnic category. This table excludes Latinos from the racial categories and assigns them to a separate category. Hispanics/Latinos may be of any race.
Race / Ethnicity (NH = Non-Hispanic)	Pop 2000	Pop 2010	Pop 2020	% 2000	% 2010	% 2020
White alone (NH)	17,671	18,007	16,645	86.53%	84.13%	81.54%
Black or African American alone (NH)	52	84	50	0.25%	0.39%	0.24%
Native American or Alaska Native alone (NH)	190	186	199	0.93%	0.87%	0.97%
Asian alone (NH)	70	122	63	0.34%	0.57%	0.31%
Pacific Islander alone (NH)	6	20	29	0.03%	0.09%	0.14%
Other race alone (NH)	24	17	58	0.12%	0.08%	0.28%
Mixed race or Multiracial (NH)	312	308	691	1.53%	1.44%	3.39%
Hispanic or Latino (any race)	2,097	2,659	2,677	10.27%	12.42%	13.11%
Total	20,422	21,403	20,412	100.00%	100.00%	100.00%

There were 10,228 (50.11%) males and 10,184 (49.89%) females, and the population distribution by age was 5,227 (25.6%) under the age of 18, 11,372 (55.7%) from 18 to 64, and 3,813 (18.7%) who were at least 65 years old. The median age was 38.6 years.

There were 7,950 households in Carbon County with an average size of 2.57 of which 5,279 (66.4%) were families and 2,671 (33.6%) were non-families. Among all families, 3,994 (50.2%) were married couples, 433 (5.4%) were male householders with no spouse, and 852 (10.7%) were female householders with no spouse. Among all non-families, 2,231 (28.1%) were a single person living alone and 440 (5.5%) were two or more people living together. 2,500 (31.4%) of all households had children under the age of 18. 5,665 (71.3%) of households were owner-occupied while 2,285 (28.7%) were renter-occupied.

The median income for a Carbon County household was $50,328 and the median family income was $63,902, with a per-capita income of $23,613. The median income for males that were full-time employees was $54,063 and for females $32,545. 15.9% of the population and 13.1% of families were below the poverty line.

In terms of education attainment, out of the 13,262 people in Carbon County 25 years or older, 1,040 (7.8%) had not completed high school, 3,897 (29.4%) had a high school diploma or equivalency, 6,102 (46.0%) had some college or associate degree, 1,471 (11.1%) had a bachelor's degree, and 752 (5.7%) had a graduate or professional degree.

=== 2010 census ===
As of the 2010 United States census, there were 21,403 people, 7,978 households, and 5,587 families in the county. The population density was 14.48 people per square mile (5.59 people/km^{2}). There were 9,551 housing units, with an average density of 6.46 per square mile (2.49/km^{2}). The racial makeup of the county was 92.31% White, 0.43% Black or African American, 1.18% Native American, 0.58% Asian, 0.01% Pacific Islander, 3.03% from other races, and 2.36% from two or more races. 12.42% of the population were Hispanic or Latino of any race.

There were 7,978 households, of which 30.16% had children under 18. 54.50% were married couples living together, 10.65% had a female householder with no husband present, and 29.97% were non-families. 25.50% of all households were made up of individuals (one person), and 11.07% had someone living alone who was 65 years of age or older. The average household size was 2.61, and the average family size was 3.14.

The population contained 30.41% under the age of 20, 6.82% aged 20 to 24, 23.73% aged 25 to 44, 25.48% aged 45 to 64, and 13.56% who were 65 years of age or older. The median age was 34.4. For every 100 females, there were 98.40 males. For every 100 females aged 18 and over, there were 96.88 males.

=== Ancestry ===
As of 2015 the largest self-reported ancestry groups in Carbon County, Utah are:

Largest ancestries (2015)	Percent
English	22.7%
German	11.9%
Italian	11.1%
Irish	6.6%
Danish	5.9%
Scottish	4.1%
Swedish	3.3%
Welsh	1.9%
Dutch	1.9%
Polish	1.4%
Norwegian	1.4%

== Politics and government ==
Carbon County historically was the base of Democratic Party support in strongly Republican Utah with its sizable unionized mining population. In 1964, Lyndon Johnson carried 72.7% of votes in the county. Notably, however, Ronald Reagan won just three votes more than did Jimmy Carter in 1980. Nonetheless, it voted for Bill Clinton in 1992 and 1996 by wide margins. At the state level, it was no less Democratic; in the 1992 gubernatorial election, it was one of two counties (the other being Summit County) that voted for Democrat Stewart Hanson over Republican Michael Leavitt.

Since the turn of the millennium, however, Carbon County has trended Republican. It voted for George W. Bush in 2000 and 2004 while voting for the Democratic gubernatorial candidates. In 2008, John McCain won Carbon County with 52.60% of the vote, versus 44.59% for Barack Obama, making him the last Democratic nominee to win more than forty percent of the county's vote. In 2012, the county's Democratic vote fell further as Mitt Romney carried 67.3% over Obama's 30.1%. In 2016, despite Utah's strong swing against the Republicans due to the presence of conservative independent Evan McMullin, Carbon County was the only county in the state to swing more Republican, as Donald Trump won 66% to Hillary Clinton's 21.5% percent. In 2020, Trump again carried the county with the largest percentage (71.4%) of any Republican to date. Despite its rightward shift, Carbon County supported 2018 Utah Proposition 4, a ballot measure to create an independent redistricting commission in the state.

State elected offices
Position	District	Name	Affiliation	First elected
Senate	27	David Hinkins	Republican	2008
House of Representatives	69	Christine Watkins	Republican	2016
Board of Education	14	Mark Huntsman	Nonpartisan	2014

United States presidential election results for Carbon County, Utah
Year	Republican		Democratic		Third party(ies)	
Year	No.	%	No.	%	No.	%
1896	85	11.36%	663	88.64%	0	0.00%
1900	748	54.01%	621	44.84%	16	1.16%
1904	1,224	65.38%	508	27.14%	140	7.48%
1908	1,023	59.82%	581	33.98%	106	6.20%
1912	771	35.42%	514	23.61%	892	40.97%
1916	1,301	44.39%	1,478	50.43%	152	5.19%
1920	1,675	47.05%	1,559	43.79%	326	9.16%
1924	1,878	37.59%	1,528	30.58%	1,590	31.83%
1928	2,184	42.10%	2,954	56.94%	50	0.96%
1932	1,655	27.04%	4,239	69.26%	226	3.69%
1936	1,348	20.71%	5,040	77.42%	122	1.87%
1940	2,242	30.07%	5,180	69.47%	34	0.46%
1944	2,318	30.12%	5,364	69.70%	14	0.18%
1948	2,704	28.89%	6,397	68.34%	259	2.77%
1952	3,770	39.44%	5,790	60.56%	0	0.00%
1956	4,507	50.26%	4,460	49.74%	0	0.00%
1960	2,953	32.79%	6,039	67.06%	14	0.16%
1964	2,130	27.30%	5,672	72.70%	0	0.00%
1968	2,618	36.17%	4,344	60.01%	277	3.83%
1972	3,956	53.19%	3,335	44.84%	147	1.98%
1976	3,360	38.70%	5,157	59.39%	166	1.91%
1980	4,320	47.67%	4,317	47.63%	426	4.70%
1984	4,393	49.82%	4,357	49.41%	68	0.77%
1988	3,019	35.09%	5,521	64.18%	63	0.73%
1992	2,038	23.11%	4,480	50.81%	2,299	26.07%
1996	2,343	30.90%	4,172	55.03%	1,067	14.07%
2000	3,758	50.89%	3,298	44.66%	328	4.44%
2004	4,950	58.18%	3,415	40.14%	143	1.68%
2008	4,091	52.30%	3,468	44.34%	263	3.36%
2012	5,090	67.27%	2,275	30.06%	202	2.67%
2016	5,275	65.95%	1,717	21.47%	1,007	12.59%
2020	6,693	71.44%	2,392	25.53%	284	3.03%
2024	6,719	71.14%	2,525	26.73%	201	2.13%

Notes:

Map of Carbon County municipalities and CDPs

== Communities ==
=== Cities ===
- East Carbon
- Helper
- Price (county seat)
- Wellington

=== Town ===
- Scofield

=== Census-designated places ===
- Carbonville
- Clear Creek
- Kenilworth
- Spring Glen
- West Wood

=== Unincorporated community ===
- Hiawatha

=== Ghost towns ===
- Castle Gate
- Coal City
- Consumers
- Hale
- Heiner
- Kiz
- Latuda
- Mutual
- National
- Peerless
- Rains
- Royal
- Spring Canyon
- Standardville
- Sweets (or Sweet)
- Wattis
- Winter Quarters

== Education ==
There are five public elementary schools in Carbon County (Bruin Point, Castle Heights, Creekview, Sally Mauro, and Wellington); two middle schools (Helper and Mont Harmon); one high school (Carbon High School). It is also the location of the charter Pinnacle Canyon Academy, which serves grades K-12, as well as the Castle Valley Center for disabled children.

Price is the location of Utah State University Eastern, which has an enrollment of approximately 1,525.

== See also ==
- National Register of Historic Places listings in Carbon County, Utah
