= Kiz, Utah =

Kiz
- Ghost town
- Location within Utah Location within the United States
- Coordinates: 39°36′17″N 110°33′18″W
- Country: United States
- State: Utah
- County: Carbon
- Established: 1906
- Abandoned: 1940
- Named for: Kiziah Dimick

Kiz is a ghost town located in arid Clark Valley, in the sparsely populated eastern part of Carbon County, Utah, United States. This agricultural settlement existed between approximately 1906 and 1940. The nearest currently inhabited town is East Carbon.

== History ==
The area was first settled in the 1890s by two successive ranchers—the first, by the name of Clark, giving his name to the valley. Each of them in turn soon abandoned his ranch, most likely due to drought conditions. In 1906 the first of the more permanent settlers arrived, Orson Dimick and John Higginson, later to be joined by Nephi Perkins and Dimick's parents, Ephraim and Kiziah. Most of the homesteaders came in the period 1910–1916, including a successful Basque sheepherder named Gratien Etchebarne who filed the first legal claim to the land in 1916. By then there were some two dozen families living in what became Kiz.

The settlers were aware of the valley's forbidding desert climate. They set about the difficult task of dry farming. Trying to save all the available water, residents dug numerous wells, and although there was no stream nearby, they built a large reservoir for irrigation.

In 1921 the American Legion promoted Clark Valley as a home for World War I veterans to establish themselves, making claims of available irrigation water that never actually arrived. It is not known how many people this advertisement brought, but by 1924 there were enough children to establish a school, in a building provided by Etchebarne. The population reached its peak in 1925, and a post office was established in 1926 in George Mead's general store. He suggested the name Kiz in honor of the first woman settler in the valley, his sister Kiziah "Aunt Kiz" Dimick.

Kiz did experience successful harvests some years, but water was always in short supply. In 1930 there was another severe drought, and most of the residents moved away. The school burned down in 1932, and the students started attending school in Sunnyside. By 1940 Kiz was a ghost town. The town's cemetery and a few empty foundations are still visible.
