= Peerless, Utah =

Peerless
- Ghost town
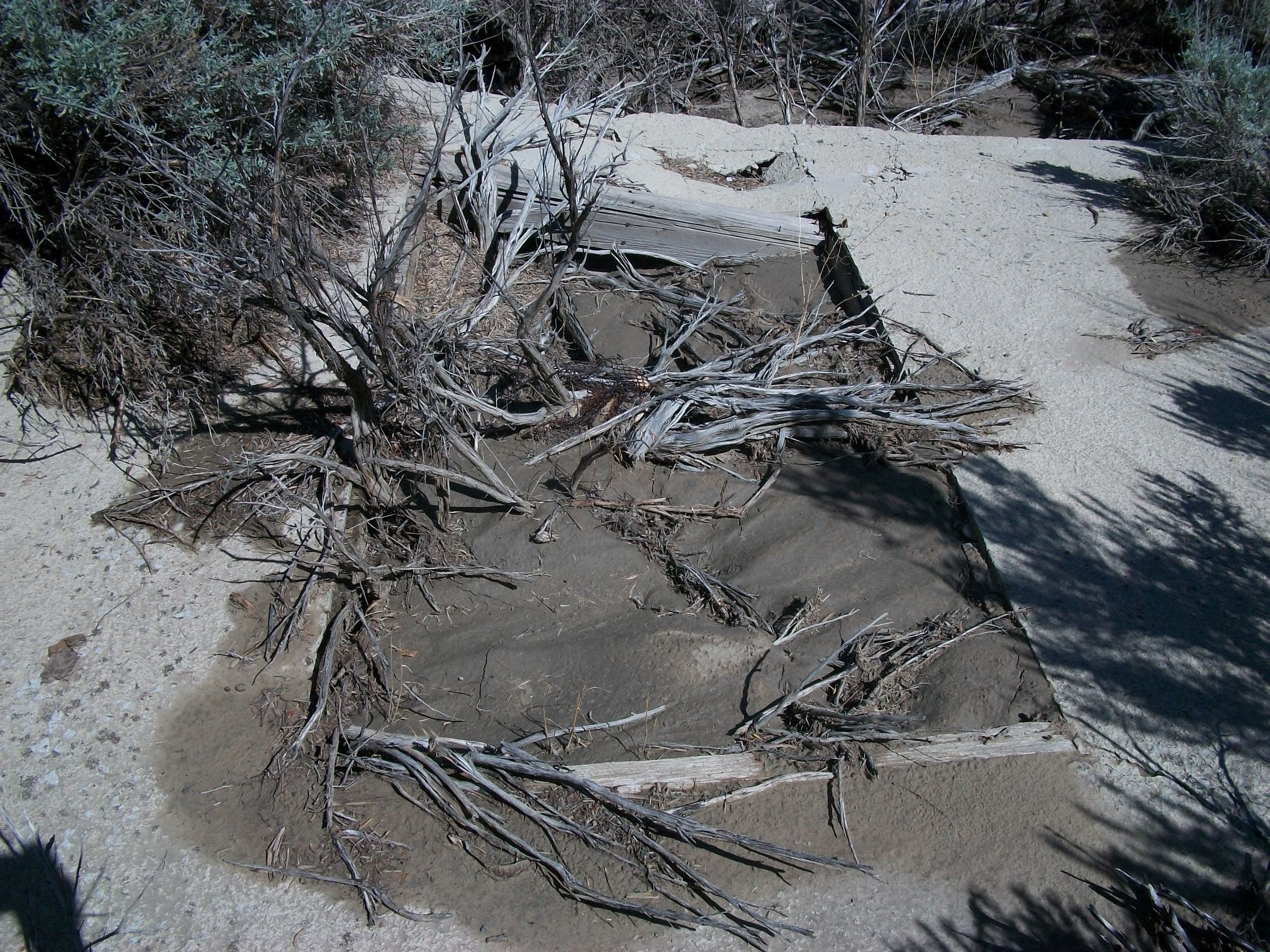
- Filled-in mine shaft at Peerless, August 2010

- Location within Utah Location within the United States
- Coordinates: 39°41′39″N 110°54′40″W
- Country: United States
- State: Utah
- County: Carbon
- Founded: 1916
- Abandoned: 1953
- Elevation: 6,447 ft (1,965 m)
- GNIS feature ID: 1437655

Peerless is a ghost town in Carbon County, Utah, United States. It is located just 3 miles (4.8 km) west of Helper.

== History ==
In 1916, 440 acres (1.8 km^{2}) of land were purchased by William and Charles Sweet. They immediately began to develop coal mining operations. In 1917, the Sweets sold the property to the Peerless Coal Company. Coal shipments began over the Denver and Rio Grande Western Railroad in 1918. As the mining continued, the population grew. At its peak, the town's population was about 300, half of which worked in the mines. The community included thirty homes, a store, a school, the mine office, a post office, and a poolhall. Coal production peaked in World War I, when 2,000 tons of coal was mined daily. In 1938, coal mining activity began to decline and people began to leave. By World War II, the mine was operating very little, and only a few people remained. The mine closed in 1954, and the rest of the residents left. A few foundations and filled-in mine shafts remain.

== See also ==
- List of ghost towns in Utah
- Coal mining in the United States
