= Pat Boyack =

American songwriter

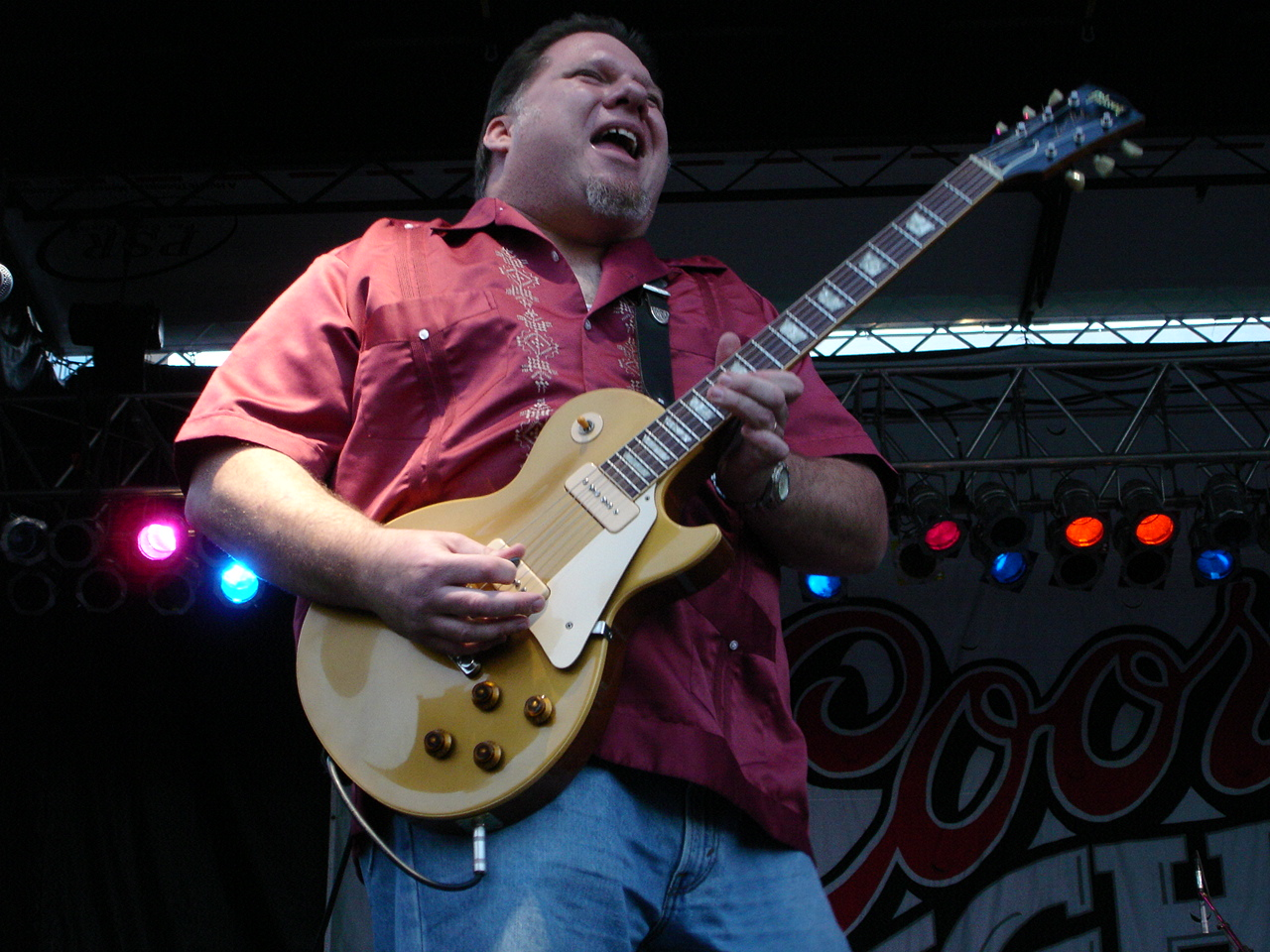
- Pat Boyack, 2008

Background information
- Born: June 26, 1967 (age 58); Price, Utah, United States
- Genres: Electric blues
- Occupation(s): Guitarist, songwriter
- Instrument: Guitar
- Years active: 1990s–present
- Labels: Bullseye Blues, Doc Blues
- Website: patboyack.com

Pat Boyack (born June 26, 1967, Price, Utah, United States) is an American electric blues guitarist and songwriter. Boyack performs modern electric blues and blues rock. He has released four albums since 1994, for both the Bullseye Blues and Doc Blues record labels.

== Biography ==
Boyack was born in Price, but grew up in Helper, Utah. At the age of fifteen he had his first guitar, and listened to a college friend's Stevie Ray Vaughan album. Inspired by contemporary Texas blues, Boyack moved to Dallas, Texas, in 1991, and played in a number of bar bands, including Rocket 88s. In 1993, Boyack formed the Prowlers with John Garza (bass) and Doug Swancy (drums). The Prowlers added Jimmy Morello (singer/harmonica) and secured a recording contract with Bullseye Blues Records (part of Rounder Records).

Pat Boyack & the Prowlers debut album Breakin' In (1994), was followed by On the Prowl (1996). By the time the third album, Super Blue & Funky, was released in 1997, a new backing band had been assembled, which took far less prominent billing. Boyack left the music industry for two years to support his wife and first child, then in 2000 Boyack's former label mate, Marcia Ball, recruited him to her backing band.

Following a change in record label, Boyack's fourth album, Voices from the Street was released in May 2004.

== Discography ==
=== Albums ===
Album title	Record label	Year of release
Breakin' In	Bullseye Blues Records	1994
On the Prowl	Bullseye Blues Records	1996
Super Blue & Funky	Bullseye Blues Records	1997
Voices from the Street	Doc Blues Records	2004

== See also ==
- List of electric blues musicians
