= Carbon Power Plant =

Coal-fired power station in Utah, US

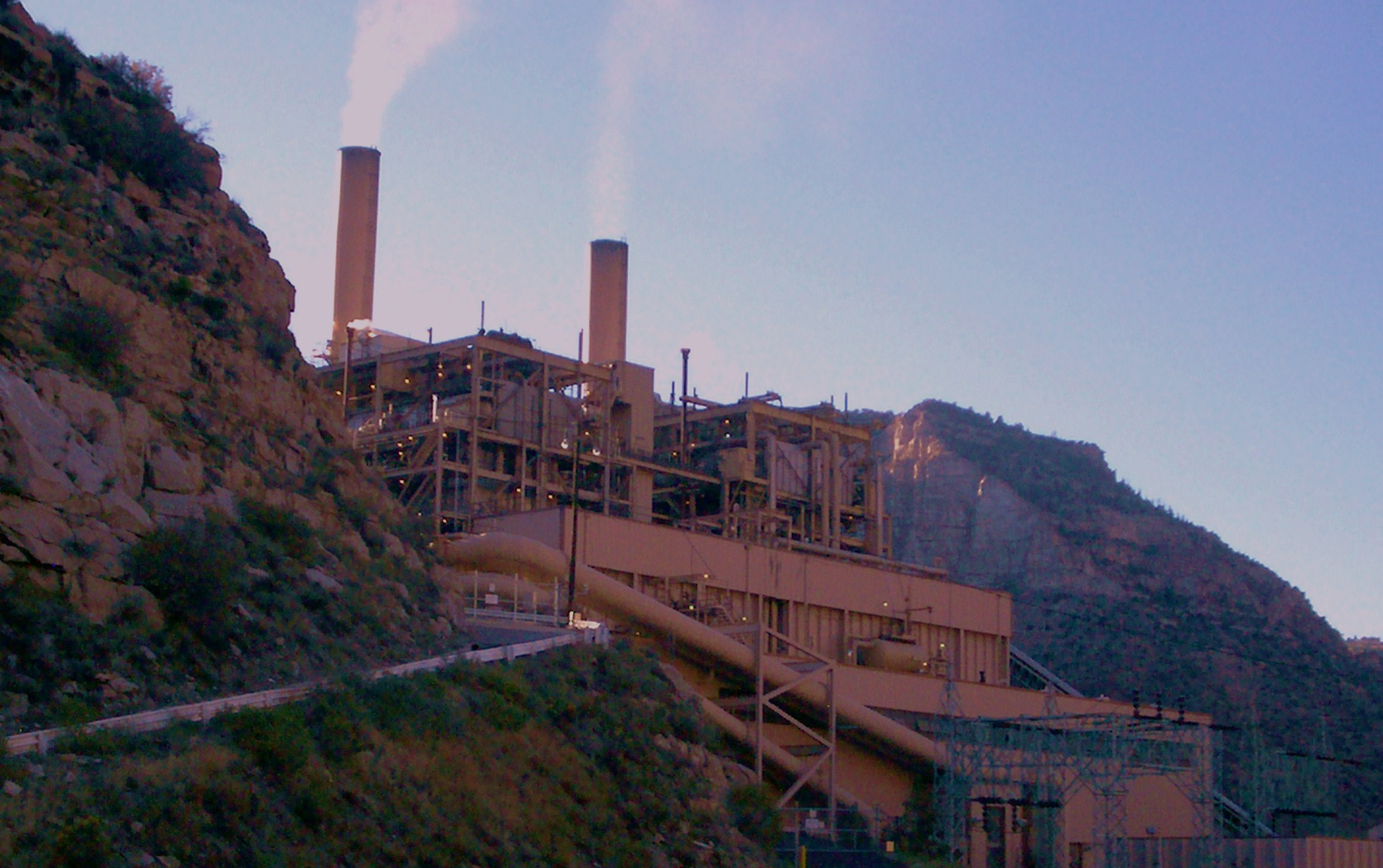
The Carbon Plant near Helper, Utah

Carbon Power Plant, also known as Castle Gate Power Plant, was a relatively small, 190-MWe coal-fired power station in Utah, US, operated by PacifiCorp. Utah Power & Light constructed its Carbon Steam Generating Plant at Castle Gate in the mid 1950s. Its units 1 and 2, rated at 75 and 113.6 MWe, were placed in service in 1954 and 1957. The plant was located at 39°43′38″N 110°51′51″W, about 3 km (2 mi) north of Helper, Utah, on the east bank of Price River.

The plant, at the time the oldest operational in Utah, was shut down on April 16, 2015, due to new restrictions on emissions of mercury compounds and was demolished in 2016.

== Environmental impact ==
=== Summary ===
Toxic release inventory (in pounds) for 2010–2011.
Pollutants released into:	Air	Water (Price River)	Land	Total on-site releases
2011
Barium compounds	660	99	108,000	108,759
Lead compounds	63.2	0	3,361.3	3,424.5
Mercury compounds	16.5	0	42.2	58.7
Hydrochloric acid	322,000	0	0	322,000
Hydrogen fluoride	91,700	0	0	91,700
2010
Barium compounds	614	74	122,000	122,688
Lead compounds	69	0	4109.7	4178.7
Mercury compounds	11.2	0	21.9	33.1
Hydrochloric acid	336,000	0	0	336,000
Hydrogen fluoride	86,500	0	0	86,500
