= Mutual, Utah =

- Unincorporated community
- Location within Utah Location within the United States
- Coordinates: 40°26′46.83″N 111°38′38.72″W
- Country: United States
- State: Utah
- County: Carbon
- Time zone: UTC-7 (Mountain (MST))
  - Summer (DST): UTC-6 (MDT)
- GNIS feature ID: 1443752

Mutual is a ghost town in Carbon County, Utah, United States.

== History ==
The Mutual coal mine was opened in February 1921 until it was shut down in 1938 after the mine was closed. The mine had already produced 63,076 tons of coal.

Th production at the mine began to decline sharply with the onset of the Great Depression.

The land was acquired under a lease agreement with the State and the government.

The Mutual Store remained in business until 1954.

== Geography ==
Is located about a half-mile northwest of Rains.

== See also ==
- List of ghost towns in Utah
