= Dividend, Utah =

Ghost town in Utah, United States

Coordinates: 39°57′17″N 112°03′41″W

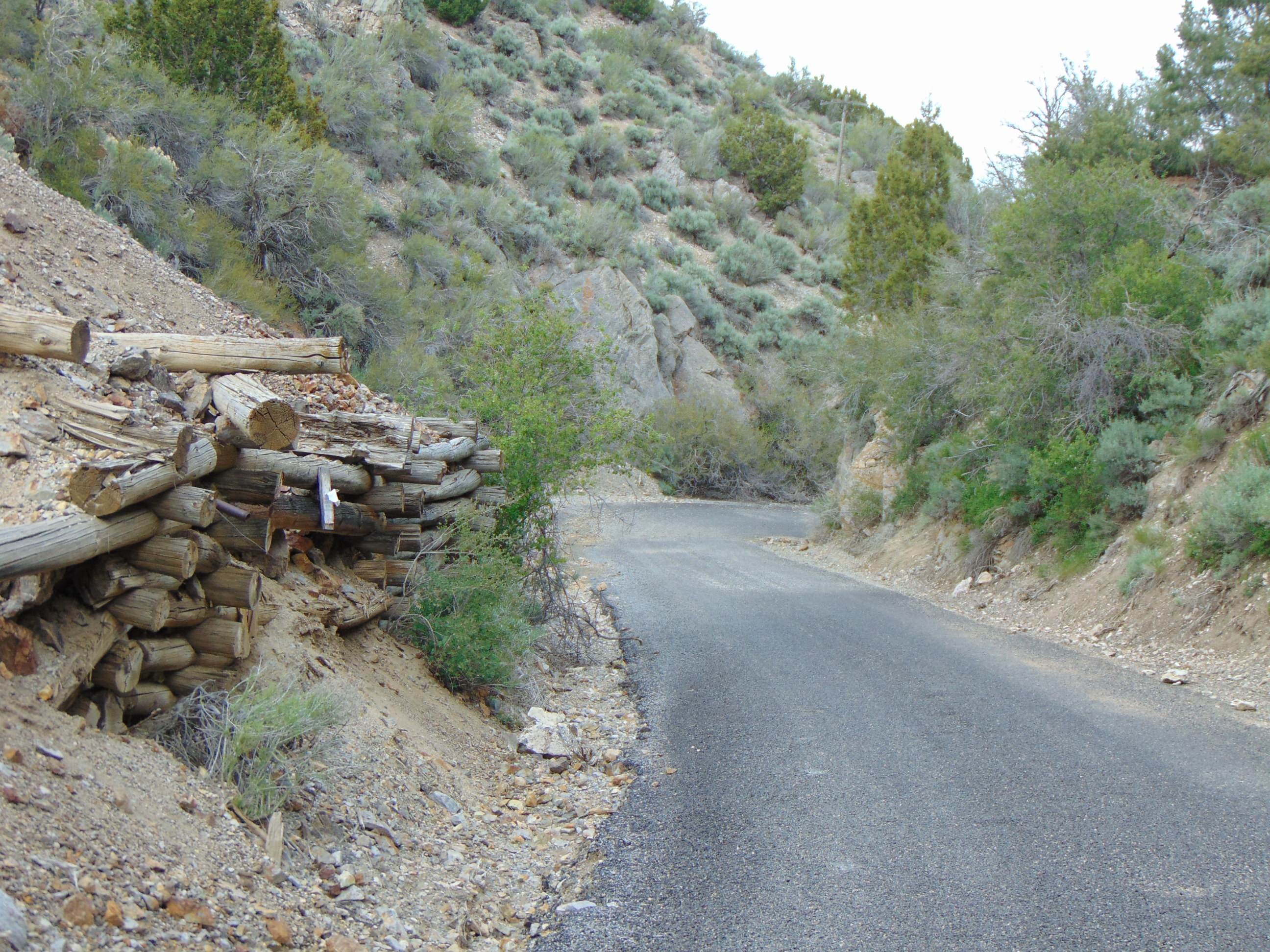
Northeast along Dividend Road, May 2016

Dividend is an extinct town in southwest Utah County, Utah, United States. The GNIS classifies it as a populated place.

Dividend first appeared as a camp for the Tintic Standard Mine in 1907. The name for the camp initially was to be Standard, but the post office rejected it for being too similar to Standardville.

A post office called Dividend was established in 1922, and remained in operation until 1951. The community was so named in the expectation a nearby mine would pay dividends. By 1922, over one million dollars had been paid in dividends.

The Tintic Standard mine reported the presence of Halotrichite, Argentojarosite, Kornelite, and Szomolnokite, plumbojarosite crystals in Dividend, Utah mines between 1914 and 1937. The Eureka Standard Consolidated Mining Co. is also reported operating in Dividend "in the Tintic mining district" and managed by the neighboring Tintic Standard Mining Co. In 1933, over 100 men were reported working for the Eureka mining company.

== See also ==
- List of ghost towns in Utah
