= Royal, Utah =

Ghost town in Carbon County, Utah, United States

Coordinates: 39°44′46″N 110°52′49″W

Royal, Utah circa 1910

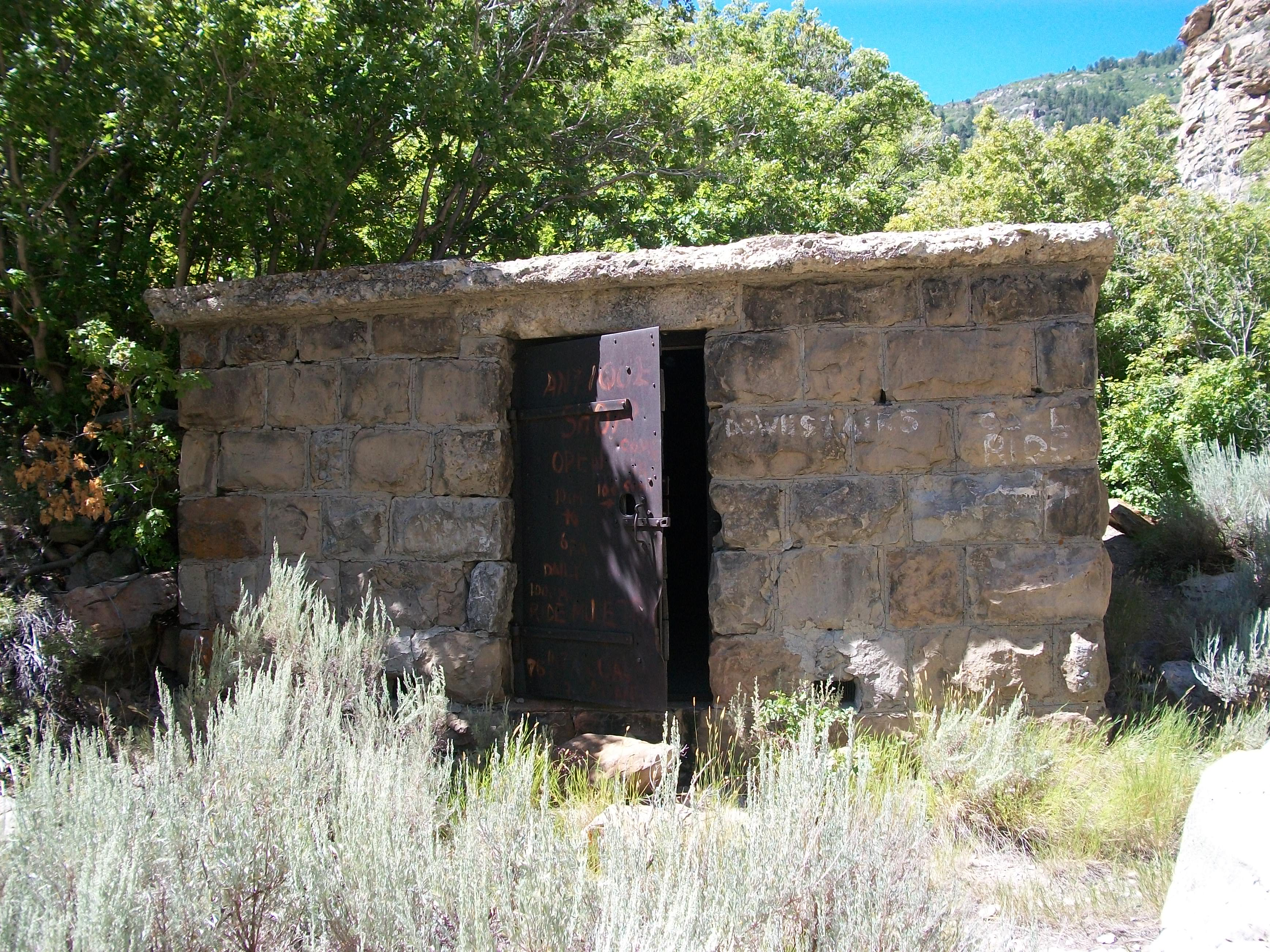
A miner's dwelling in Royal, 2010

Royal is a ghost town that existed in the early 1900s as a small coal mining town in Carbon County, Utah, United States. Originally called Bear Canyon, the town was renamed Cameron, Rolapp, and finally Royal when the Royal Coal Company purchased it, changing names each time a new owner took over. All that remains of Royal today are some stone walls, a couple of the mines, and a miner's dwelling. These remnants can be seen in Price Canyon.

The historian and author Helen Z. Papanikolas was born here in 1917, during which time the town was known as Cameron.

== See also ==
- List of ghost towns in Utah
