= Castle Gate, Utah =

Castle Gate
- Ghost town
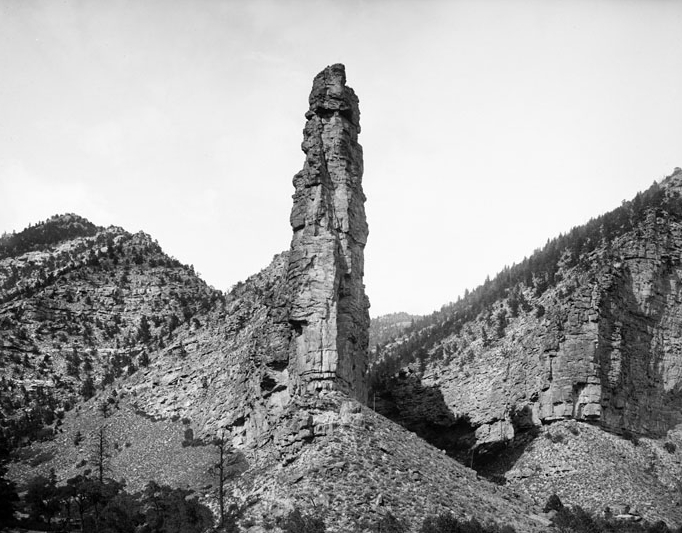
- Castle Gate spires, near old townsite

- Location within the United States Location within Utah
- Coordinates: 39°43′40″N 110°52′03″W
- Country: United States
- State: Utah
- County: Carbon
- Founded: 1886
- Abandoned: 1974; 52 years ago
- Named for: Rock formation resembling the gate of a castle
- Elevation: 6,152 ft (1,875 m)
- GNIS feature ID: 1426382

Castle Gate is a ghost town in the western United States, located in Carbon County in eastern Utah. A mining town approximately ninety miles (140 km) southeast of Salt Lake City, its name was derived from a rock formation near the mouth of Price Canyon. This formation features two sheer sandstone walls on either side of the Price River, which appear to open like a giant gate as travelers approach this narrow section of the canyon.

== Coal mining origins ==
The first coal mine, named the Castle Gate Mine #1, opened around 1886, after the Denver and Rio Grande Western Railroad constructed its Utah Division over the Wasatch Plateau, from the town of Springville. The mine produced high-quality coal for the steam trains. Castle Gate Mine #2 opened in 1912, and was found to have the finest coal in the region. In 1914, Castle Gate was incorporated as a town, which was owned and tightly controlled by the Utah Fuel Company and the D&RGW; a third mine opened in 1922.

== Historic events ==
The town is most famous for two historic events. On April 21, 1897, Butch Cassidy and Elzy Lay held up an employee of the Pleasant Valley Coal Company in a daylight robbery at the busy railroad station in Castle Gate, making off with $7,000 in gold.

On March 8, 1924, the Utah Fuel Company's Castle Gate Mine #2 exploded, killing 172 miners. Fatalities included 49 Greeks, 22 Italians, 8 Japanese, 7 English, 6 Austrians (Yugoslavs), 2 Scots, 1 Belgian, and 76 Americans, including 2 African-Americans. It was the third-deadliest disaster in the history of coal mining in the United States at that time.

At least 24 out of the mine's 25 mules died in the explosion, along with an unknown number of horses and canaries. Additionally, rescuers commandeered about 20 of the community's pet birds to use as poison gas level detectors during the rescue and recovery efforts. They had an additional 30 canaries shipped in overnight. About 16 canaries died in the process.

On August 1, 2000, the mine exploded again, killing two men. The German coal company RAG AG owned the mine at the time. The mine was renamed Willow Creek Mine.

In 2025, the now-abandoned mine caught fire. Workers of the Abandoned Mine Reclamation Program, part of Utah's Department of Natural Resources Division of Oil, Gas & Mining (DOGM), sealed the mine. However, the fire still burns underground as of March 8, 2026.

== Deconstruction of the town ==
Castle Gate was dismantled in the summer of 1974, and residents were relocated to a new subdivision at the mouth of Spring Canyon, west of Helper. The former townsite was cleared and replaced with coal-loading facilities neighboring the railroad line.

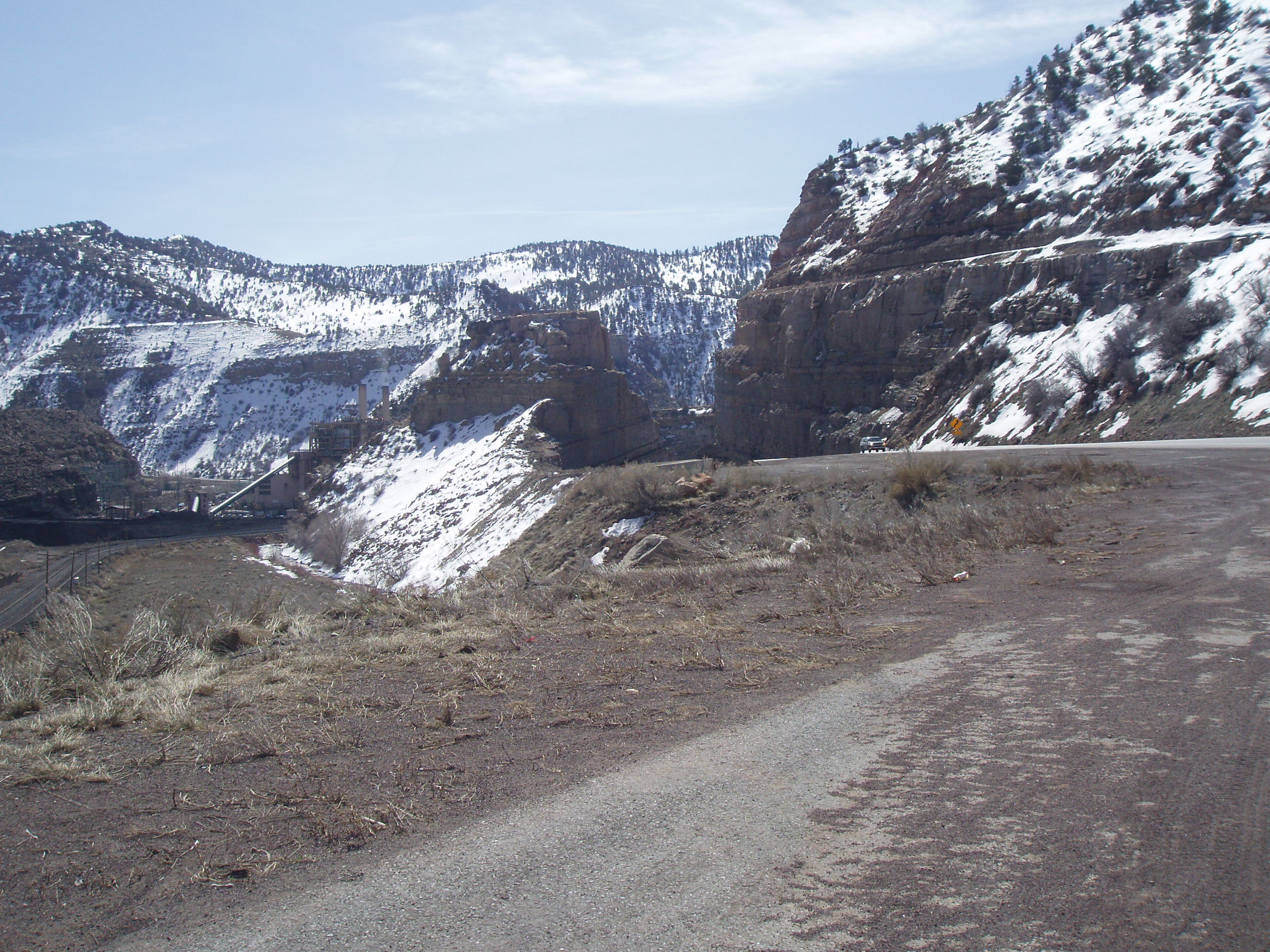
Castle Gate, with the former townsite to the left

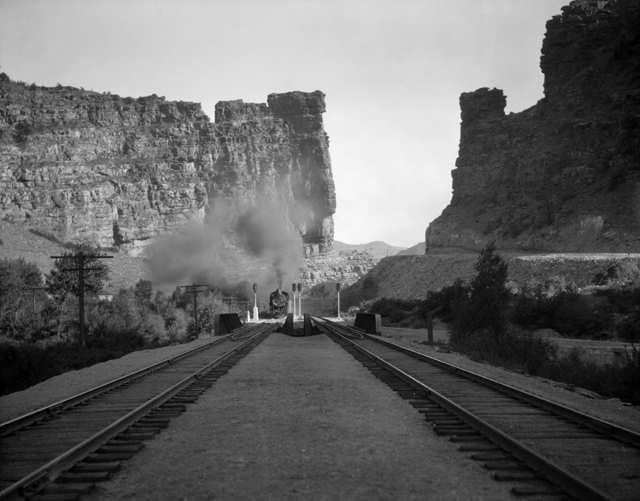
Denver and Rio Grande Western Railroad locomotive at Castle Gate (circa 1929)

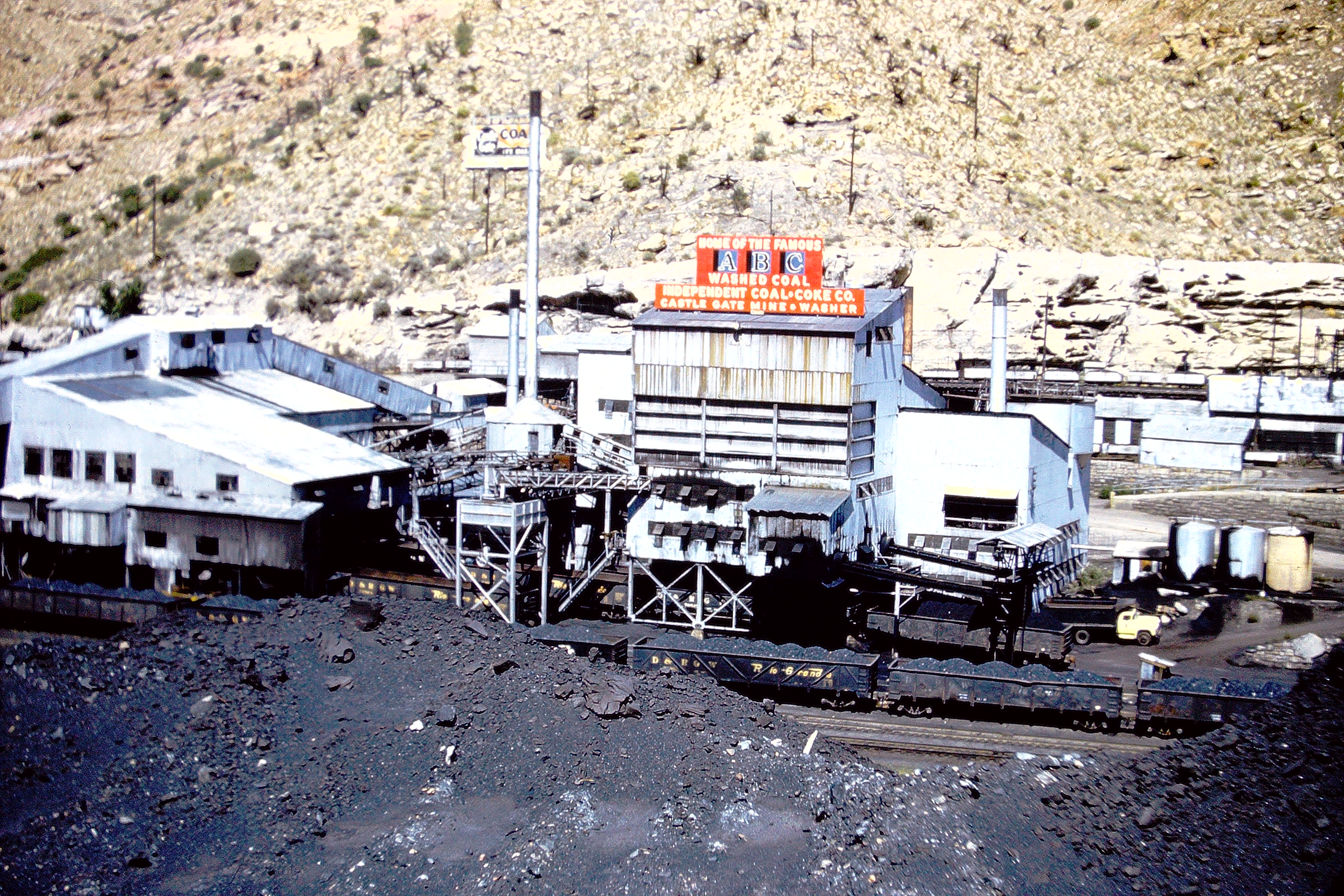
Castle Gate Coal Mine, circa 1959

== See also ==
- List of ghost towns in Utah
