= Winter Quarters, Utah =

Winter Quarters
- Ghost town
- Location within Utah Location within the United States
- Coordinates: 39°43′14″N 111°11′16″W
- Country: United States
- State: Utah
- County: Carbon
- Founded: 1879
- Abandoned: 1930
- Elevation: 8,084 ft (2,464 m)
- GNIS feature ID: 1447486

Winter Quarters is a ghost town in Carbon County, Utah, United States. Coal was discovered in the area in 1875, and later that year, the Pleasant Valley Coal Company began coal mining operations. A group of coal miners was delayed during an early winter storm in 1877, which led to the town's name of Winter Quarters. On May 1, 1900, an explosion in the Winter Quarters Number Four mine killed 200 miners. Despite the mine explosion, the coal mining operations remained active until 1922, when the opening of a new mine in Castle Gate caused many people to relocate there. By 1930, Winter Quarters was abandoned.

== Geography ==
Winter Quarters is located west of Scofield, near Winter Quarters Canyon. Lower Gooseberry Reservoir is located west of Winter Quarters. Clear Creek and Electric Lake are south of Winter Quarters.

== History ==
Prior to the discovery of coal in 1875, several pioneers had settled in Pleasant Valley, where Winter Quarters was located. In late 1875, the Pleasant Valley Coal Company began coal mining operations. In the winter of 1877, a group of fourteen coal miners led by Peter Morgan was traveling from Fairview to Sanpete County. They became trapped in snow for several months, which led to the camp's name of Winter Quarters. As the Winter Quarters mine developed, miners began to move into the area. As the town grew, the need for a railroad increased. In response to the town's high demand for a railroad, in 1879, Milan Packard, a merchant from Springville, financed the construction of a railroad from Springville to Winter Quarters and Scofield. The railroad was named the Utah and Pleasant Valley Railroad until it was purchased by the Denver and Rio Grande Western Railroad in 1883. Approximately 1,800 people were living in Winter Quarters by 1900, and the mine was considered the safest in the state. The town's Main Street was over a mile long, and it had many businesses, most of which were made of stone.

On May 1, 1900, an explosion occurred in the Winter Quarters Number Four mine. Immediately following the explosion, miners working in the Winter Quarters Number One mine, which was connected to the Number Four mine, were killed by the carbon monoxide gas that was a product of the mine explosion. Rescue crews consisting of men from Clear Creek, Castle Gate, and Sunnyside, along with locals from the valley, worked for almost a week recovering bodies. The final death count reported by the Pleasant Valley Coal Company was 200, though other reports reported 246 deaths. 62 of the deceased were Finns. The state inspector's report concluded that the cause of the explosion was an accidental ignition of black powder, which ignited the coal dust in the air. The Pleasant Valley Coal Company supplied each deceased miner with a coffin and burial clothes. The company also provided $500 to each family affected by the mine explosion.

Following the mine disaster, mining operations in Winter Quarters continued until a new mine was opened at Castle Gate in 1922. Miners from Winter Quarters and Scofield relocated to the new mine, and as a result, coal production in Pleasant Valley began to decrease. In 1930, the last few residents of Winter Quarters relocated to a more productive area.

== Remnants ==
The walls of the Wasatch Store can be seen from the road leading into Winter Quarters. Several foundations and the remains of the blacksmith shop also remain. The railroad bed is now a dirt road leading to Tucker. Winter Quarters is located on private property, and is posted to trespassing.

== See also ==
- Coal mining in the United States
- List of ghost towns in Utah
