= Helper, Utah =

City in Utah, United States

- City
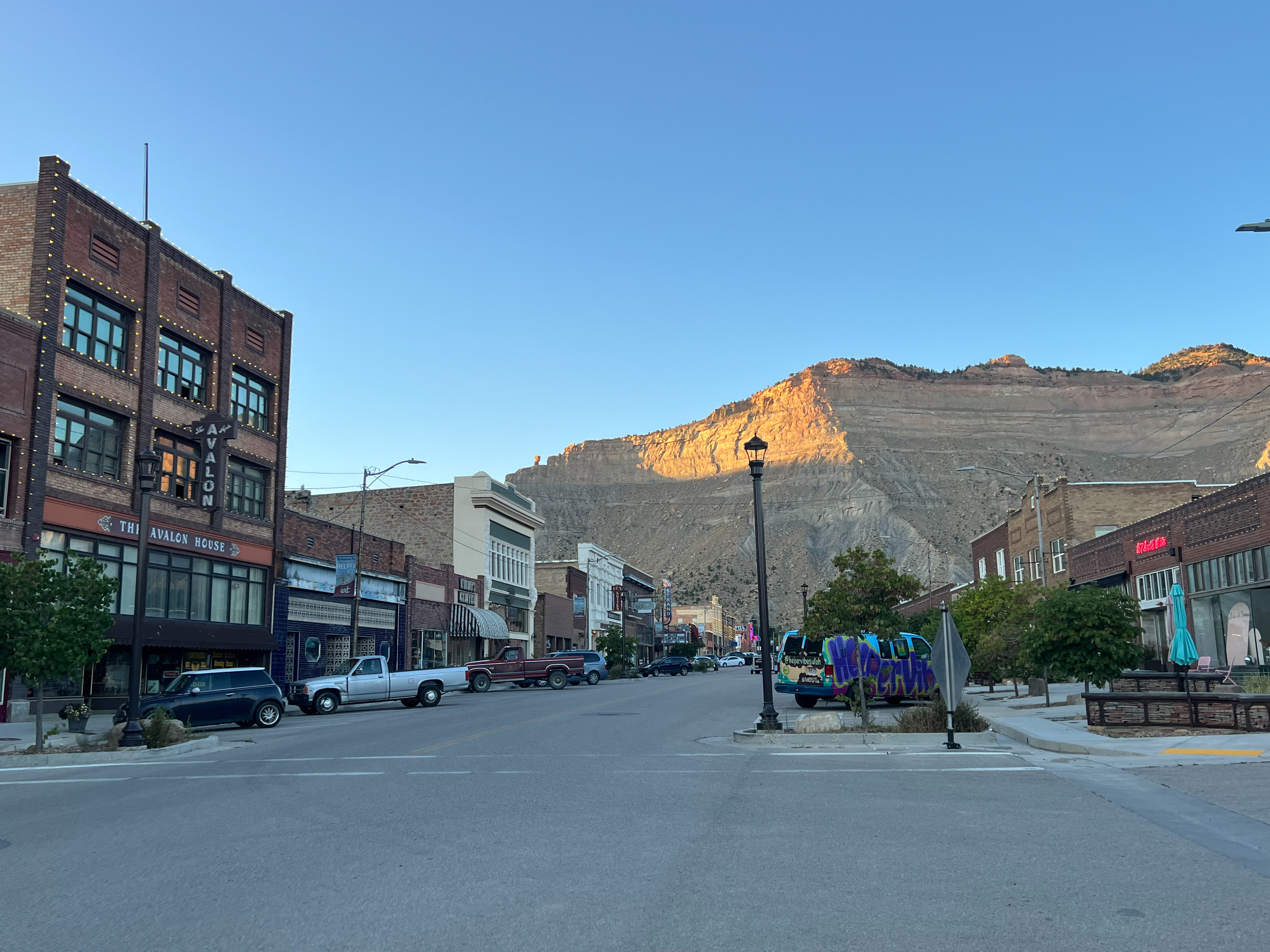
- North along Main Street, September 2023

- Location within Carbon County and the State of Utah

- Location of Utah in the United States
- Coordinates: 39°41′15″N 110°51′54″W
- Country: United States
- State: Utah
- County: Carbon
- Settled: c. 1881
- Incorporated: 1907
- Became a city: October 9, 1915
- Founder: Teancum Pratt
- Named for: Helper engines

Area
  - Total: 1.81 sq mi (4.68 km^{2})
  - Land: 1.81 sq mi (4.68 km^{2})
  - Water: 0 sq mi (0.00 km^{2})
- Elevation: 5,909 ft (1,801 m)

Population (2020)
  - Total: 2,112
  - Density: 1,165.2/sq mi (449.87/km^{2})
- Time zone: UTC-7 (Mountain (MST))
  - Summer (DST): UTC-6 (MDT)
- ZIP code: 84526
- Area code: 435
- FIPS code: 49-34530
- GNIS feature ID: 2410737
- Website: www.helpercity.gov

Helper is a city in Carbon County, Utah, United States, approximately 110 miles (180 km) southeast of Salt Lake City and 7 miles (11 km) northwest of the city of Price. The population was 2,112 at the 2020 census.

The city is located along the Price River and U.S. Route 6/U.S. Route 191, a shortcut between Provo and Interstate 70, on the way from Salt Lake City to Grand Junction, Colorado. It is the location of the Western Mining and Railroad Museum, a tourist attraction that also contains household and commercial artifacts illustrating late 19th and early 20th-century living conditions.. Helper is at the western end of the Book Cliffs, the longest continuous escarpment in the world.

== History ==
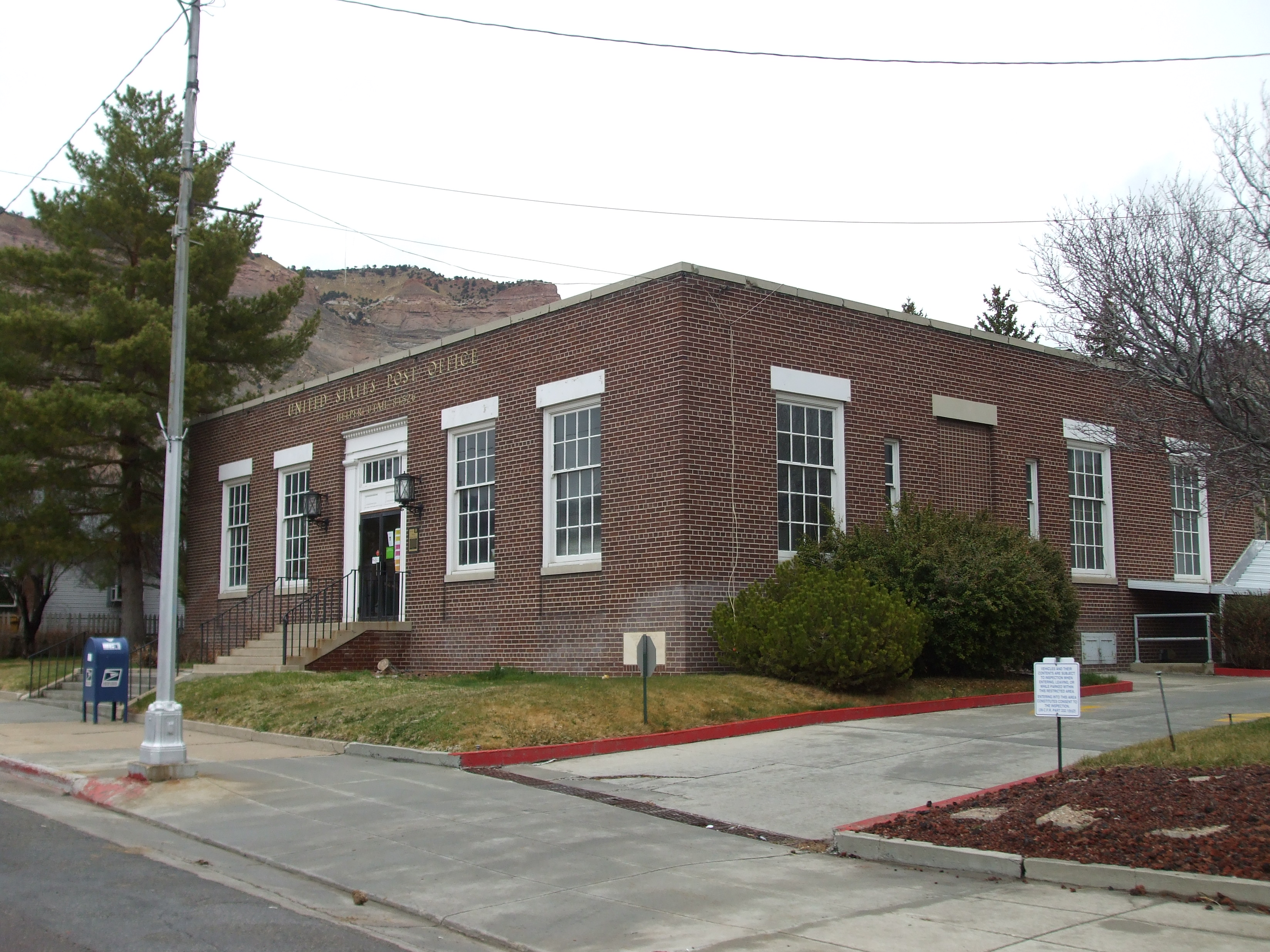
Helper's post office is one of three sites listed on the National Register of Historic Places

With the arrival of the Denver and Rio Grande Western Railroad (D&RGW) in 1881–82, Helper began to develop as a population center. By 1887 the D&RGW had erected some twenty-seven frame residences, with more built later in the year. The railroad planned to make Helper a freight terminal after the rail lines were changed from narrow to standard gauge. The changeover process began in 1889 and was completed in 1891. In 1892, Helper designated the division point between the eastern and western D&RGW terminals in Grand Junction, Colorado, and Ogden, Utah, respectively, and a new depot, hotel, and other buildings were constructed.

On April 21, 1897, Butch Cassidy and Elzy Lay robbed the Pleasant Valley Coal Company in nearby Castle Gate; they stayed in Helper the day before. It was said that Butch Cassidy later came back to Helper for occasional visits.

Adjacent to Helper is Spring Glen. It was first established in 1880, with Teancum Pratt being one of the first settlers. A Branch of the Church of Jesus Christ of Latter-day Saints was organized there in 1885 with Francis Marion Ewell as president. It was made a ward in 1889. As of 1930, less than 20% of the population in Spring Glen were members of the Church of Jesus Christ of Latter-day Saints.

Helper's growth proceeded in a slow but deliberate fashion bearing little resemblance to booming metal-mining towns. The first amenities offered to the few settlers and numerous railroad workers included three saloons, one grocery store, and one clothing establishment. A school was built in 1891. By 1895 the D&RGW buildings and shops at Helper were lighted by electricity, and two reservoirs for water had been constructed.

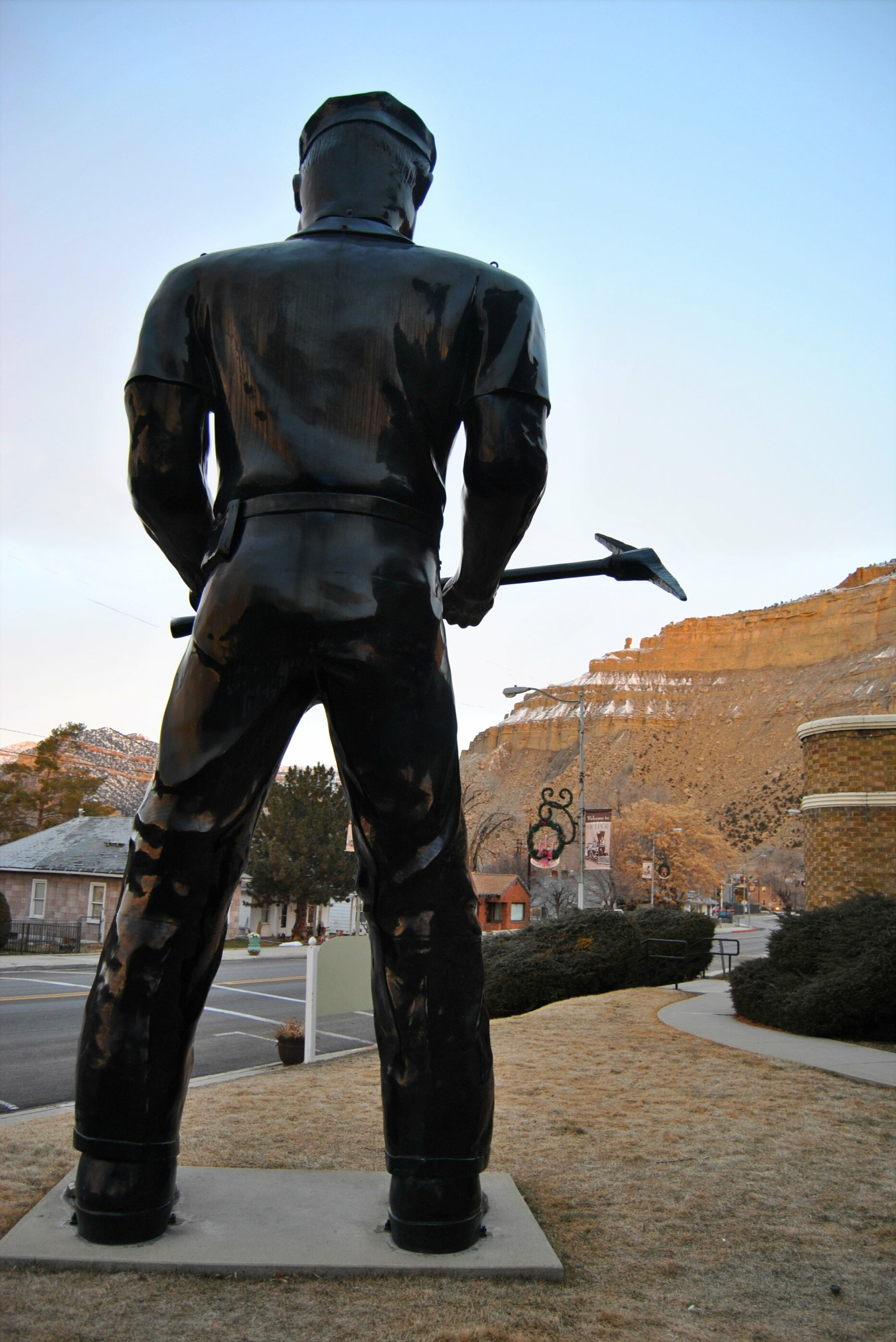
"Big John" Muffler Man in Helper, December 2010

Ethnic diversity was destined to become a chief characteristic of Helper. Industrial expansion, coal mining, and railroading required a great amount of unskilled labor. In 1894 the railroad's passenger department established an immigration bureau to advertise Utah Territory. This move coincided with the influx of numerous immigrants from southern and eastern Europe and Asia.

Chinese laborers were brought in early to work the Carbon County mines and railroads. By the late 1890s, Italians and Austrians (primarily Slovenians, Croatians, and Serbians) began to arrive. In 1900 Helper's population was listed at 385 people. Sixteen different nationality groups were represented. "Merchant" and "laborer" comprised most of the occupations for these early immigrants.

After the unsuccessful coal miners' strike of 1903–04, Italians, blacklisted from the mines at nearby Castle Gate, ventured into Helper to establish businesses and farms along the Price River. The influx of strikers into Helper accelerated its growth, with the newly established farms offering needed agricultural products.

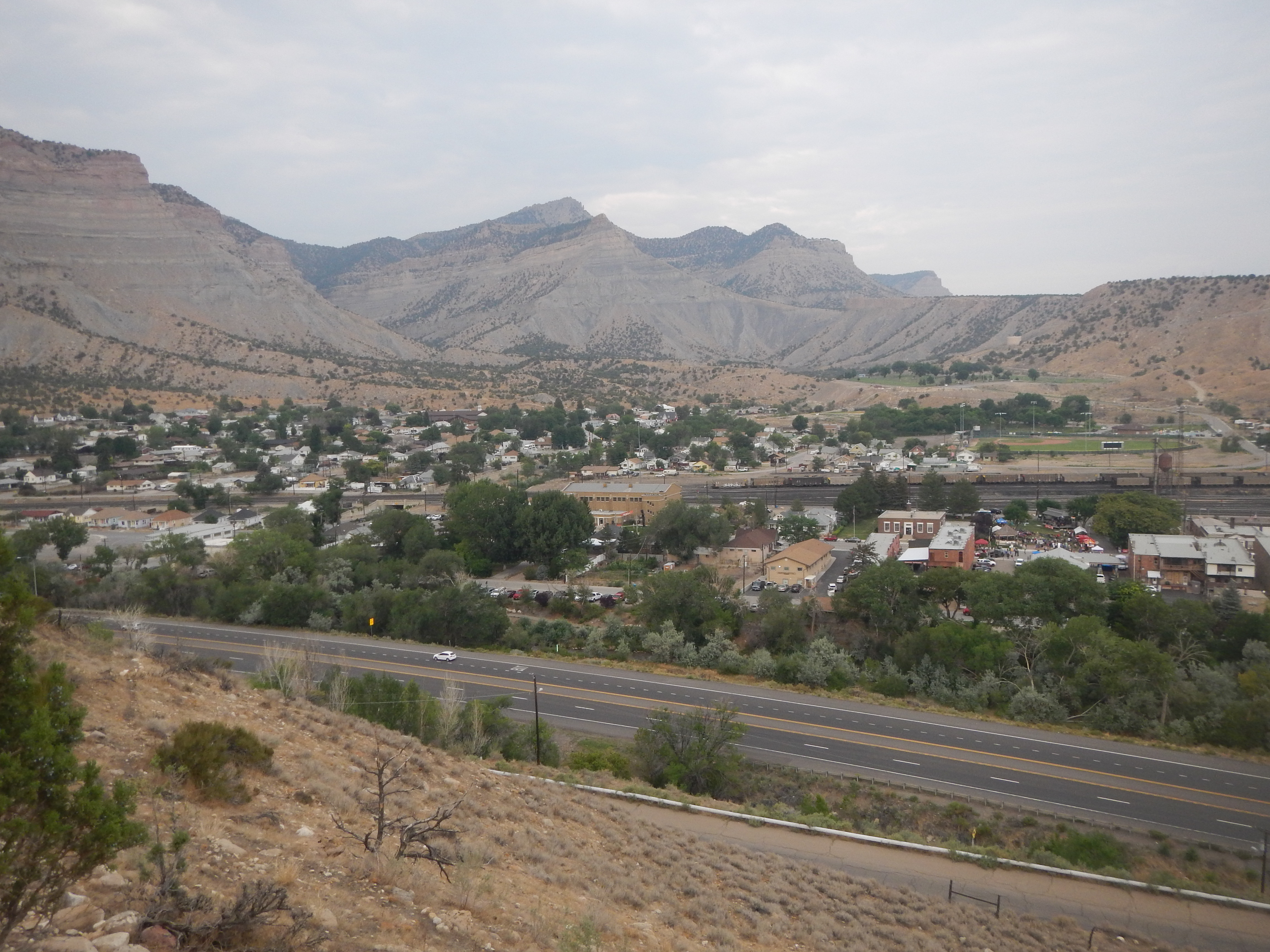
Helper from Reservoir St

The twentieth century was launched in Carbon County (which had been formed in 1894 from Emery County) in a shroud of uncertainty, largely due to the strike situation. Greek and Japanese immigrants were brought in to break the strike, and thus new ethnic groups came onto the scene. Helper, along with Price, was fast becoming the center of the Carbon County coalfields, providing service functions to the outlying camps. A 1903–04 business directory listed sixteen separate businesses in Helper; by 1912–13, the number had grown to twenty-nine, with a population of about 850. Helper townsite was regularly organized and incorporated in 1907 with a president of the town board and members of the board serving the community.

By 1914–15 there were 71 businesses listed for Helper, with 84 in 1918–19 and 157 in 1924–25. Many of Helper's business enterprises were associated with specific ethnic groups, but this fact illustrated the business opportunities available in the town, enabling immigrants to "break the ranks of labor." Italian and Chinese-owned businesses were joined in the 1910s and 1920s by Slavic, Greek, and Japanese establishments. Specialty shops, cafes, coffeehouses, saloons, theaters, general mercantile, and various service-oriented businesses formed Helper's commercial district. Some ventures, such as the Mutual Mercantile Company, were joint operations between ethnic groups.

Ethnic identities, inter- and intra-group rivalries, new waves of immigration, and Helper's position as a neutral ground for labor influenced the town's social landscape. Helper became known as the area "hub" because it was nestled among various mining camps, and it served as a city of refuge where strikers and union organizers, as well as national guardsmen, could congregate during tense times. Customs and lifestyles associated with various ethnic groups continued; however, through interaction, many eventually were changed and modified in the Helper environment.

While the Great Depression hit the entire county, Helper's position as a railroad center provided some stability. Helper's city hall was built in 1927, and a civic auditorium was constructed in 1936. The D&RGW developed "bridge traffic," acquiring trade from other major roads that wanted transcontinental connections.

Coal production increased during World War II and continued strong through the 1960s, with significant periods of uncertainty and temporary decline. Not all of the communities surrounding Helper were able to weather these difficult periods of economic instability, and the town is within a few miles of a large number of former coal mining settlements that were abandoned between the 1930s and 1970s and are now ghost towns. These towns include Castle Gate, Coal City, Consumers, National, Peerless, Rains, Royal, and Standardville, as well as Mutual.

Helper was named the top western town for 2006 by the True West Magazine, in the January/February 2007 issue.

=== Power plant closure ===
The approach of the compliance date of April 16, 2015, for enhanced EPA controls on the emission of mercury resulted in a decision by Rocky Mountain Power, a subsidiary of PacifiCorp, to close down the Carbon power plant in Helper on April 15, 2015. It had been in operation since 1954.

=== Name ===
Helper is situated at the mouth of Price Canyon, alongside the Price River, on the eastern side of the Wasatch Plateau in Central Utah. Trains traveling westward from the Price side to the Salt Lake City side of the plateau required additional "helper" engines in order to make the steep (2.4% grade) 15-mile (24 km) climb up Price Canyon to the town of Soldier Summit. The town was named after these helper engines, which the Denver and Rio Grande Western Railroad stationed in the city.

== Geography ==
According to the United States Census Bureau, the city has a total area of 1.8 square miles (4.7 km^{2}), all land, along the Price River.

=== Climate ===
Helper has a hot-summer humid continental climate (Köppen Dfa).

Climate data for Helper, Utah
Month	Jan	Feb	Mar	Apr	May	Jun	Jul	Aug	Sep	Oct	Nov	Dec	Year
Record high °F (°C)	57 (14)	64 (18)	80 (27)	80 (27)	93 (34)	98 (37)	105 (41)	102 (39)	90 (32)	86 (30)	78 (26)	55 (13)	105 (41)
Mean daily maximum °F (°C)	36 (2)	41 (5)	50 (10)	58 (14)	69 (21)	80 (27)	87 (31)	84 (29)	74 (23)	60 (16)	46 (8)	36 (2)	60 (16)
Mean daily minimum °F (°C)	18 (−8)	21 (−6)	29 (−2)	34 (1)	42 (6)	52 (11)	58 (14)	57 (14)	48 (9)	37 (3)	26 (−3)	18 (−8)	37 (3)
Record low °F (°C)	−9 (−23)	−9 (−23)	2 (−17)	11 (−12)	20 (−7)	29 (−2)	36 (2)	35 (2)	26 (−3)	12 (−11)	0 (−18)	−14 (−26)	−14 (−26)
Average rainfall inches (mm)	1.03 (26)	1.09 (28)	0.96 (24)	1.24 (31)	1.25 (32)	1.03 (26)	1.22 (31)	1.27 (32)	1.89 (48)	1.70 (43)	0.67 (17)	0.81 (21)	14.16 (359)
Source: Weather.com

== Demographics ==
Historical population
Census	Pop.	Note	%±
1900	402		—
1910	905		125.1%
1920	1,606		77.5%
1930	2,707		68.6%
1940	2,843		5.0%
1950	2,850		0.2%
1960	2,459		−13.7%
1970	1,964		−20.1%
1980	2,724		38.7%
1990	2,148		−21.1%
2000	2,025		−5.7%
2010	2,201		8.7%
2020	2,112		−4.0%
U.S. Decennial Census

=== 2020 census ===
As of the 2020 census, Helper had a population of 2,112. The median age was 39.9 years. 24.4% of residents were under the age of 18 and 18.4% of residents were 65 years of age or older. For every 100 females there were 99.6 males, and for every 100 females age 18 and over there were 96.9 males age 18 and over.

98.3% of residents lived in urban areas, while 1.7% lived in rural areas.

There were 894 households in Helper, of which 30.9% had children under the age of 18 living in them. Of all households, 45.5% were married-couple households, 21.5% were households with a male householder and no spouse or partner present, and 24.8% were households with a female householder and no spouse or partner present. About 28.7% of all households were made up of individuals and 13.1% had someone living alone who was 65 years of age or older.

There were 1,082 housing units, of which 17.4% were vacant. The homeowner vacancy rate was 2.1% and the rental vacancy rate was 16.7%.

Racial composition as of the 2020 census
Race	Number	Percent
White	1,811	85.7%
Black or African American	1	0.0%
American Indian and Alaska Native	18	0.9%
Asian	4	0.2%
Native Hawaiian and Other Pacific Islander	2	0.1%
Some other race	66	3.1%
Two or more races	210	9.9%
Hispanic or Latino (of any race)	295	14.0%

=== 2000 census ===
As of the 2000 census, there were 2,025 people, 814 households, and 559 families residing in the city. The population density was 1,132.7 people per square mile (437.3 people/km^{2}). There were 925 housing units at an average density of 517.4 per square mile (199.8/km^{2}). The racial makeup of the city was 92.59% White, 0.44% African American, 1.58% Native American, 0.25% Asian, 0.10% Pacific Islander, 3.90% from other races, and 1.14% from two or more races. Hispanic or Latino of any race were 11.31% of the population.

There were 814 households, out of which 31.8% had children under the age of 18 living with them, 51.8% were married couples living together, 11.2% had a female householder with no husband present, and 31.3% were non-families. 27.6% of all households were made up of individuals, and 13.9% had someone living alone who was 65 years of age or older. The average household size was 2.44, and the average family size was 2.97.

In the city, the population was spread out, with 25.5% under 18, 9.1% from 18 to 24, 26.1% from 25 to 44, 20.9% from 45 to 64, and 18.4% aged 65 years of age or older. The median age was 39 years. For every 100 females, there were 98.5 males. For every 100 females aged 18 and over, there were 93.8 males.

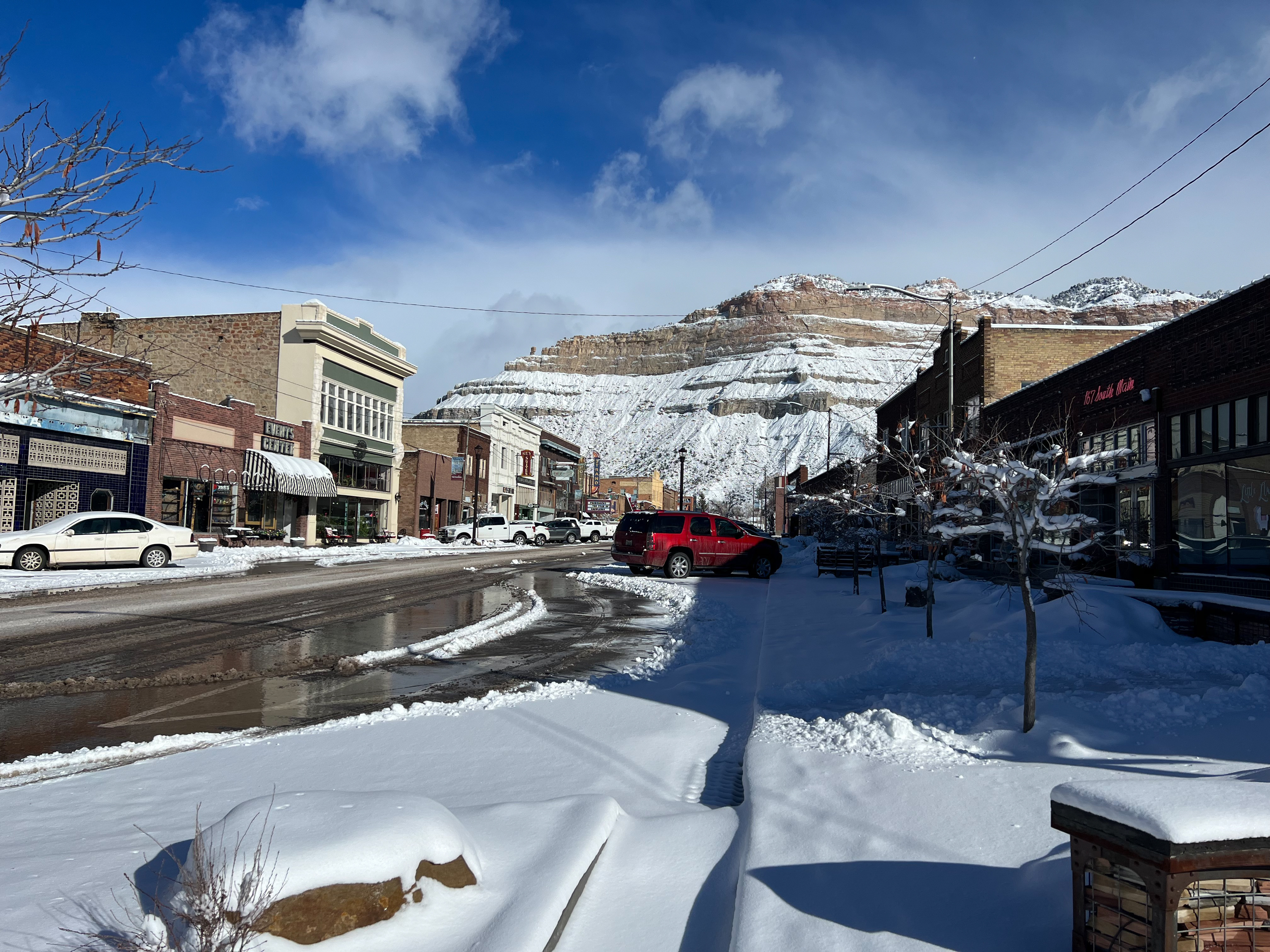
Helper after a snowstorm, February 2023

The median income for a household in the city was $30,052, and the median income for a family was $37,266. Males had a median income of $32,708 versus $22,500 for females. The per capita income was $15,762. About 11.1% of families and 12.7% of the population were below the poverty line, including 13.3% of those under age 18 and 13.7% of those age 65 or over.

== Education ==
Helper has two schools that belong to the Carbon School District (Carbon County, Utah). Located in western Helper is its lone elementary school, Sally Mauro Elementary, and located about a half mile east of the elementary school is Helper Middle School.

== Transportation ==
Amtrak (the National Passenger Rail Corporation) provides service to Helper station, operating its California Zephyr daily in both directions between Chicago and Emeryville, California, across the bay from San Francisco. The now-defunct Rio Grande Zephyr also stopped at Helper. It also lies along U.S. Route 6/191, which split just north of the city – U.S. 191 heads northeast to Duchesne, while U.S. 6 heads northwest to Spanish Fork. Both continue together southeast to I-70 just west of Green River.

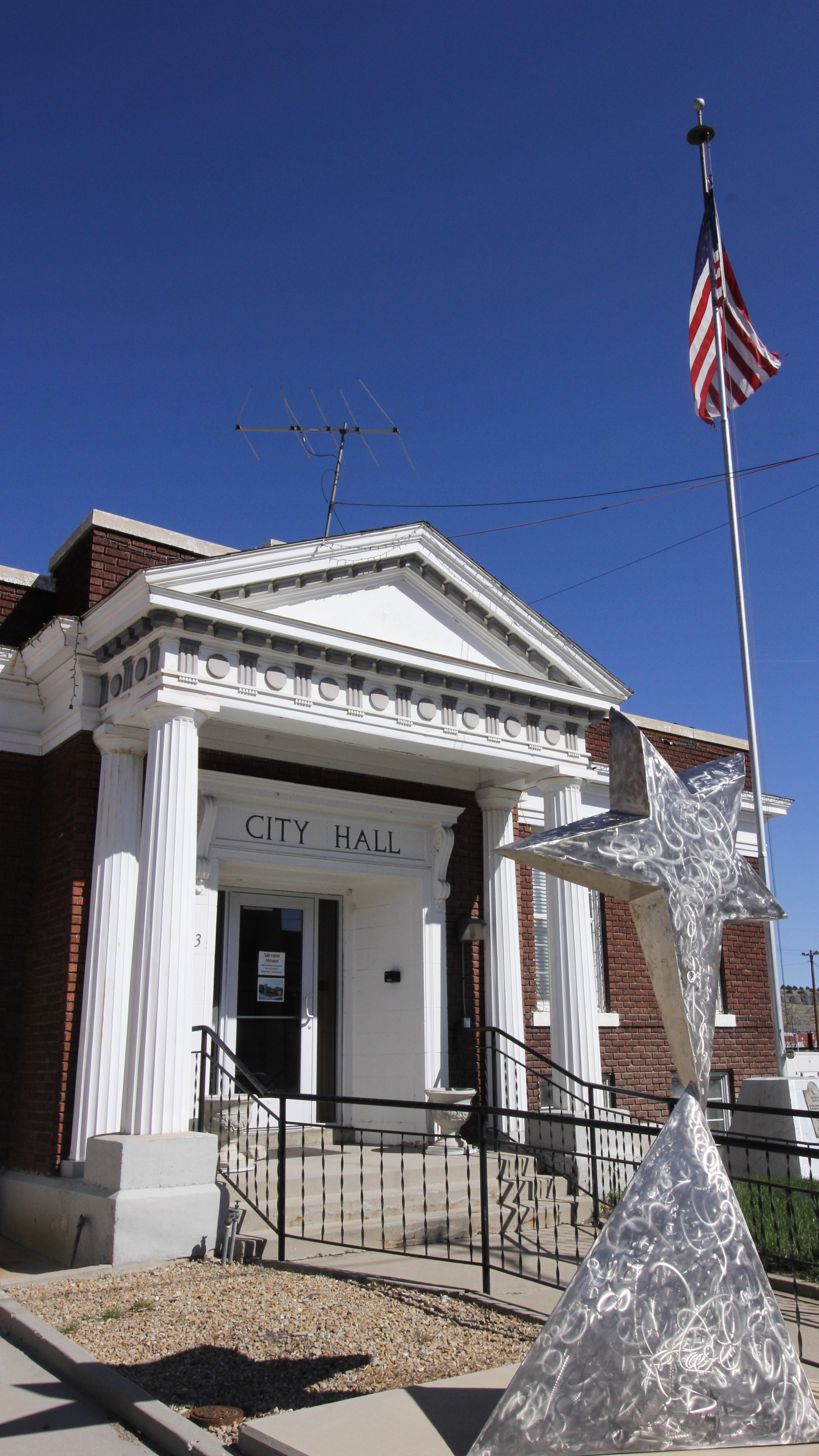
Helper, Utah, City Hall 2019

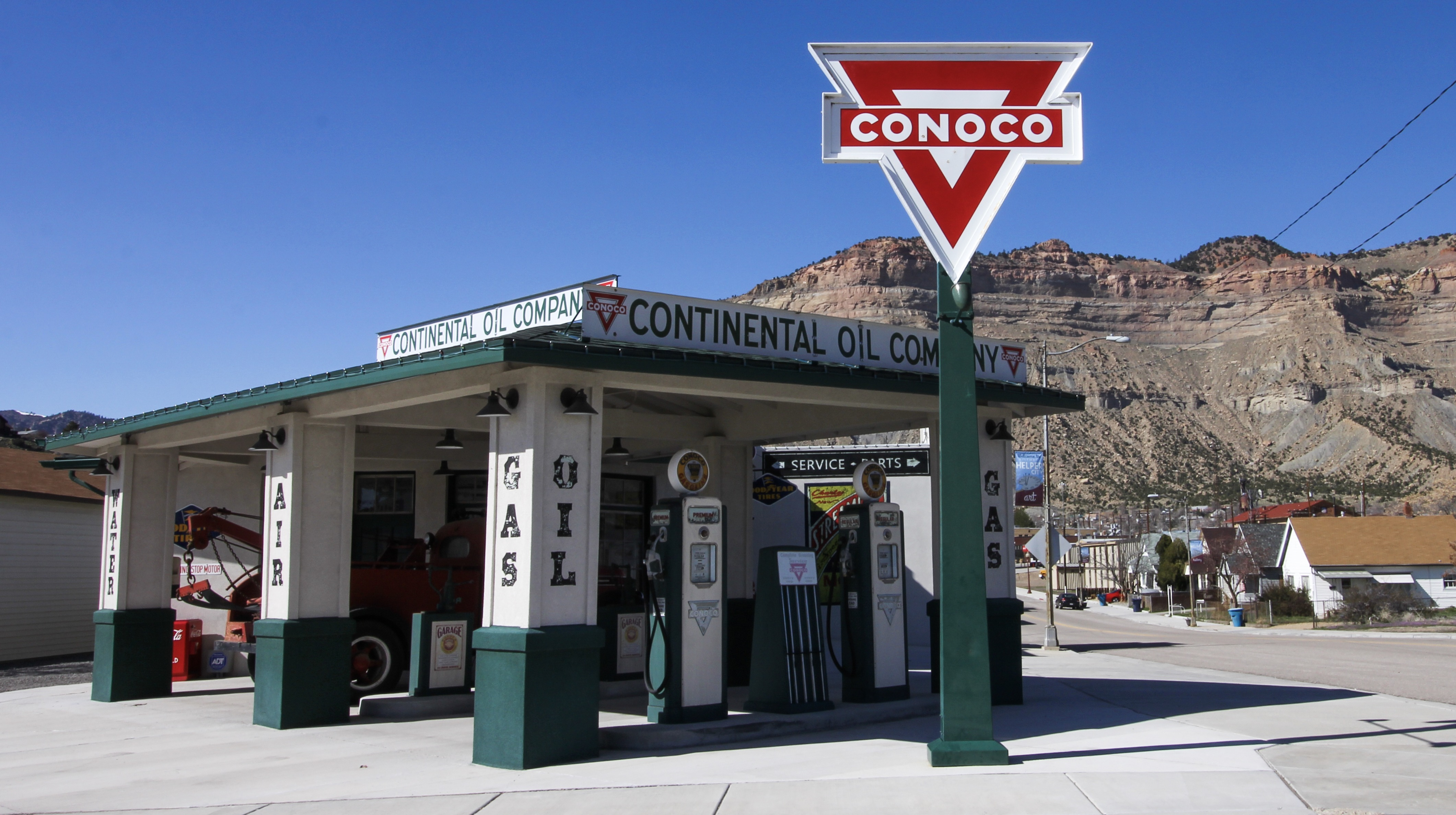
Helper, Utah, Restored Conoco gas station 2019

== Notable people ==
- Tom M. Apostol, mathematician born in Helper
- Pat Boyack, musician, grew up in Helper
- Jay Lambert, Olympic boxer, born in Helper
- Helen Z. Papanikolas, historian and writer, grew up in Helper

== See also ==
- Helper Historic District
- List of cities and towns in Utah
