= Standardville, Utah =

Standardville
- Ghost town
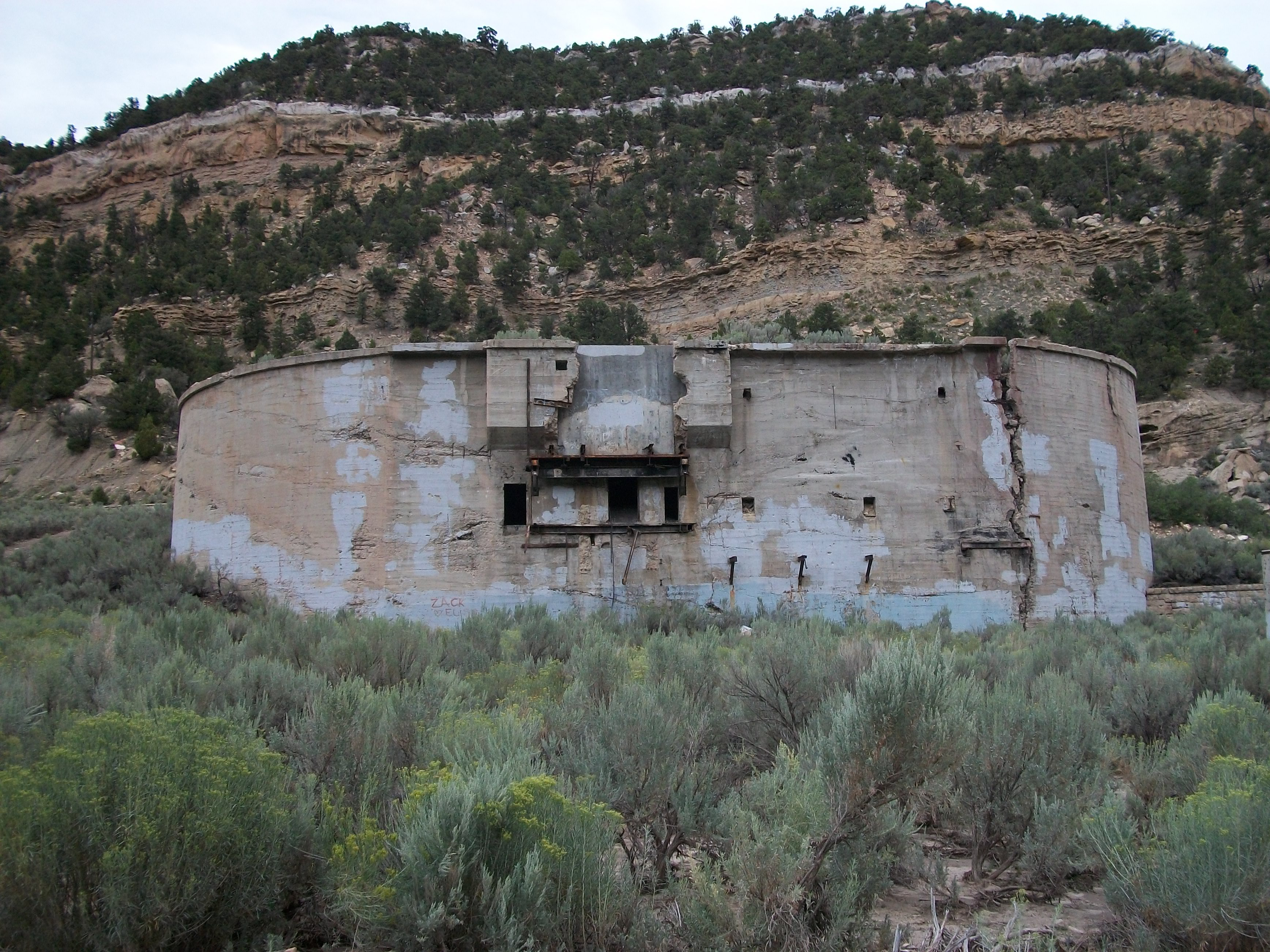
- The coal storage unit in Standardville

- Location within Utah Location within the United States
- Coordinates: 39°42′00″N 110°56′01″W
- Country: United States
- State: Utah
- County: Carbon
- Founded: 1912
- Abandoned: 1970s
- Named for: The "standard" for all mining towns to follow
- Elevation: 6,739 ft (2,054 m)
- GNIS feature ID: 1437692

Standardville is a ghost town in Carbon County, Utah, United States. Standardville was established after coal was discovered in the area in 1912. The layout of the town was so well-planned, it became the "standard" for all mining towns to follow, which resulted in the town name of Standardville. In 1922, a group of striking miners killed a mine guard and wounded two miners before escaping. In 1930, 20 miners were killed in a mine explosion caused by carbon monoxide gas. In 1950, the mine shut down and people began to relocate elsewhere. A couple of families remained until the 1970s, after which Standardville was abandoned.

== History ==
The town was established after coal was discovered in Spring Canyon in 1912. The town layout was planned with well maintained lawns, bushes, and poplar trees. This became the "standard" for coal mining towns in Spring Canyon, and the town was named Standardville. As Standardville's population increased, a company store, several apartments, a butcher shop, a barber shop, a hospital, a recreation hall, tennis courts, and an elementary school were constructed. At its peak, the population was about 550. Although it was considered the standard for mining towns, Standardville still had problems with crime. On June 14, 1922, several miners went on strike and attacked a train carrying several new miners from both sides. The striking miners then fled and were pursued by mine guards. The shooting that occurred killed a mine guard and wounded two others.

On February 6, 1930, an explosion caused by firedamp gas occurred in the Standard mine. Of the 29 miners that were working in the mine, 20 were immediately killed by the explosion. Rescue workers attempted to rescue the nine survivors, and while they were searching, a cave-in killed three of them. The nine survivors were able to escape. The explosion had a large impact on the mine and community; however, the town continued to grow.

When World War II ended, the demand for coal decreased, and the mine was unable to meet its payroll as a result. In an attempt to save the mine, miners worked only for food. This attempt was unsuccessful, and the mine went bankrupt and was foreclosed on. Another coal mining company bought it, and shipments continued a couple months later. By 1948, the mine was being operated by the Spring Canyon Coal Company; however, in 1950, the mine was closed. As miners moved away, shops, the hospital, and the school were closed. Despite this, two families continued to live in the town until the 1970s.

== Remnants ==
The coal tipple has deteriorated, leaving behind the coal storage unit. Numerous foundations can be found. At the top of the hill lies the bath house, where miners bathed and changed clothes. Remains of the Standard Mine can be found beyond the bath house. Railroad tracks that were once the property of the Denver and Rio Grande Western Railroad end in town. Due to its proximity to the road, many of the remnants have graffiti. The town is now fenced off and posted as private property, but most of the ruins can be seen from the road.

== Demographics ==
Historical population
Census	Pop.	Note	%±
1930	506		—
1940	532		5.1%

Standardville was included in the United States Census twice. The Census of 1930 showed 506 people living in town. By 1940, Standardville's population had increased to 532. By 1950, Standardville's population had dropped considerably enough to not be included in that year's census.

== Gallery ==
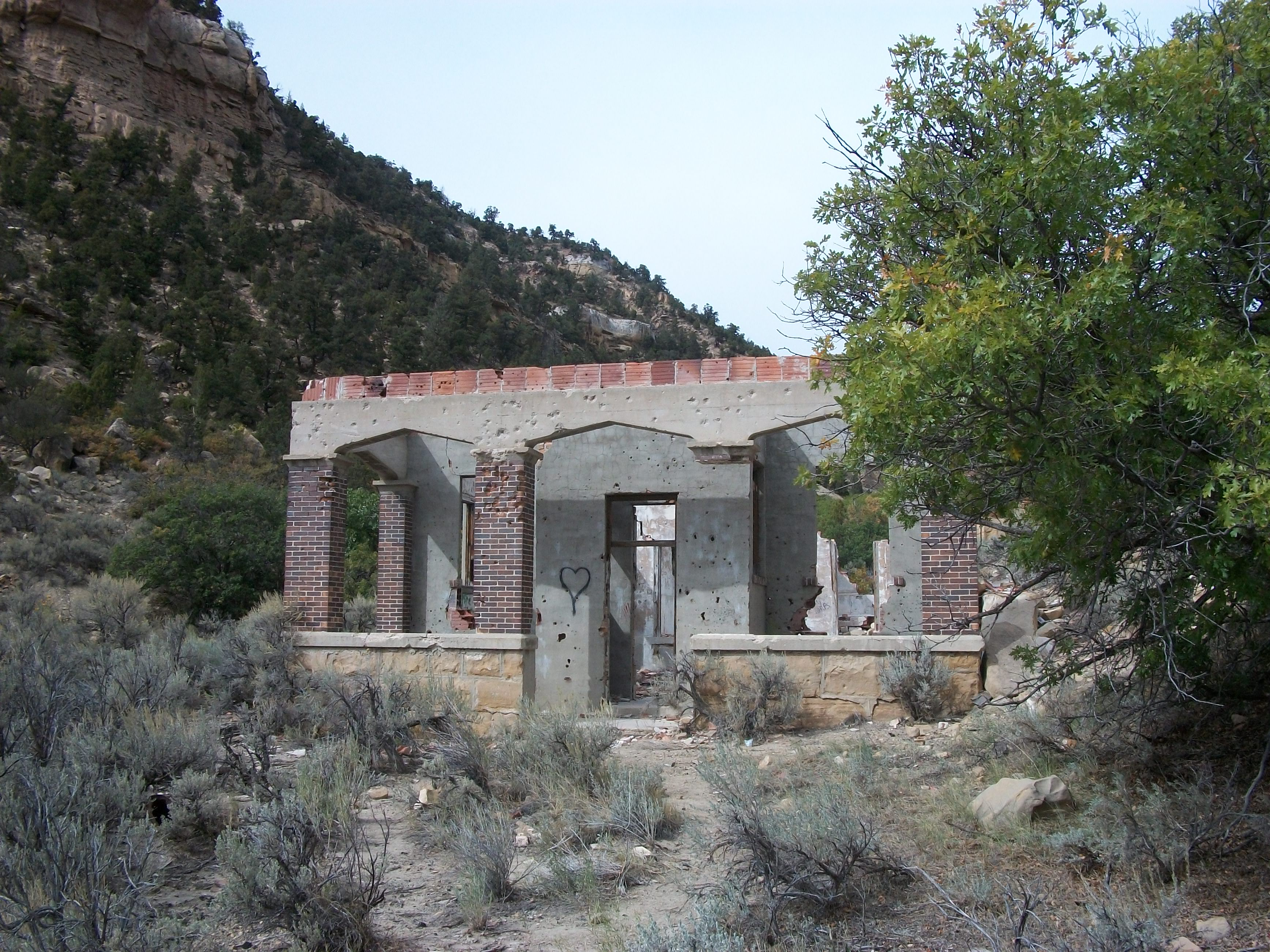
Miners bath house

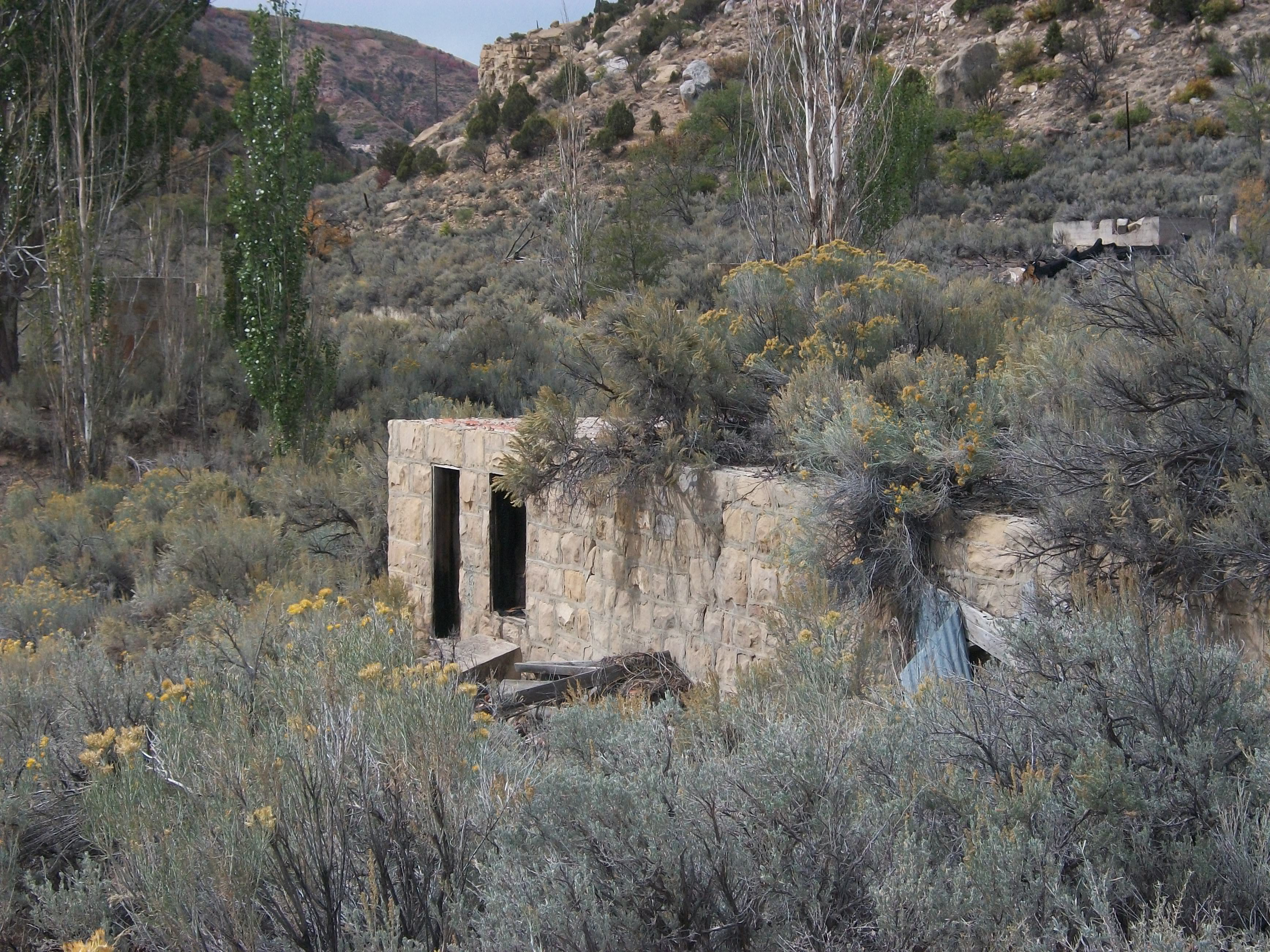
a mining truck shop

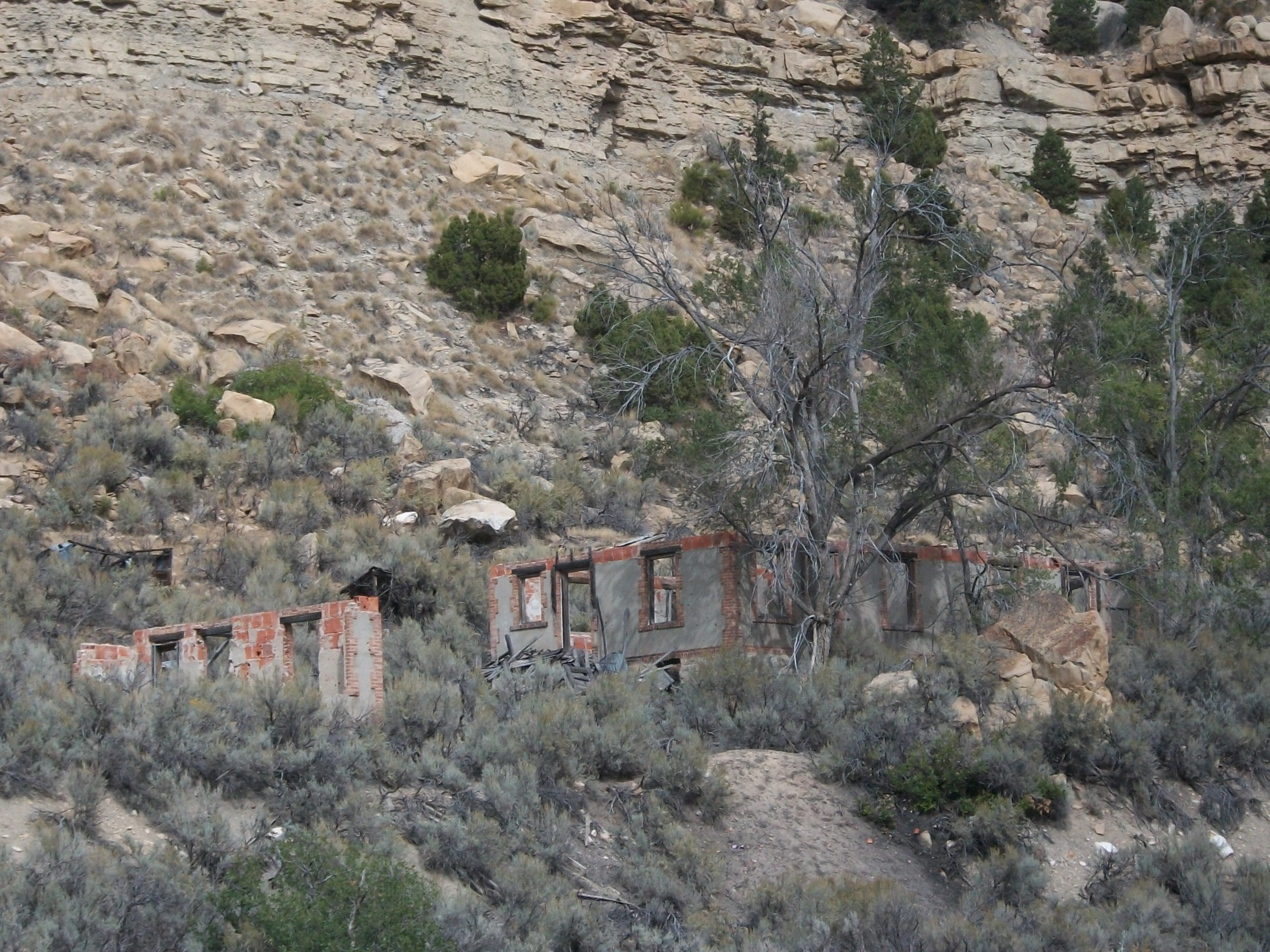
A couple buildings

== See also ==
- Coal mining in the United States
- List of ghost towns in Utah
