= West Wood, Utah =

- Census-designated place
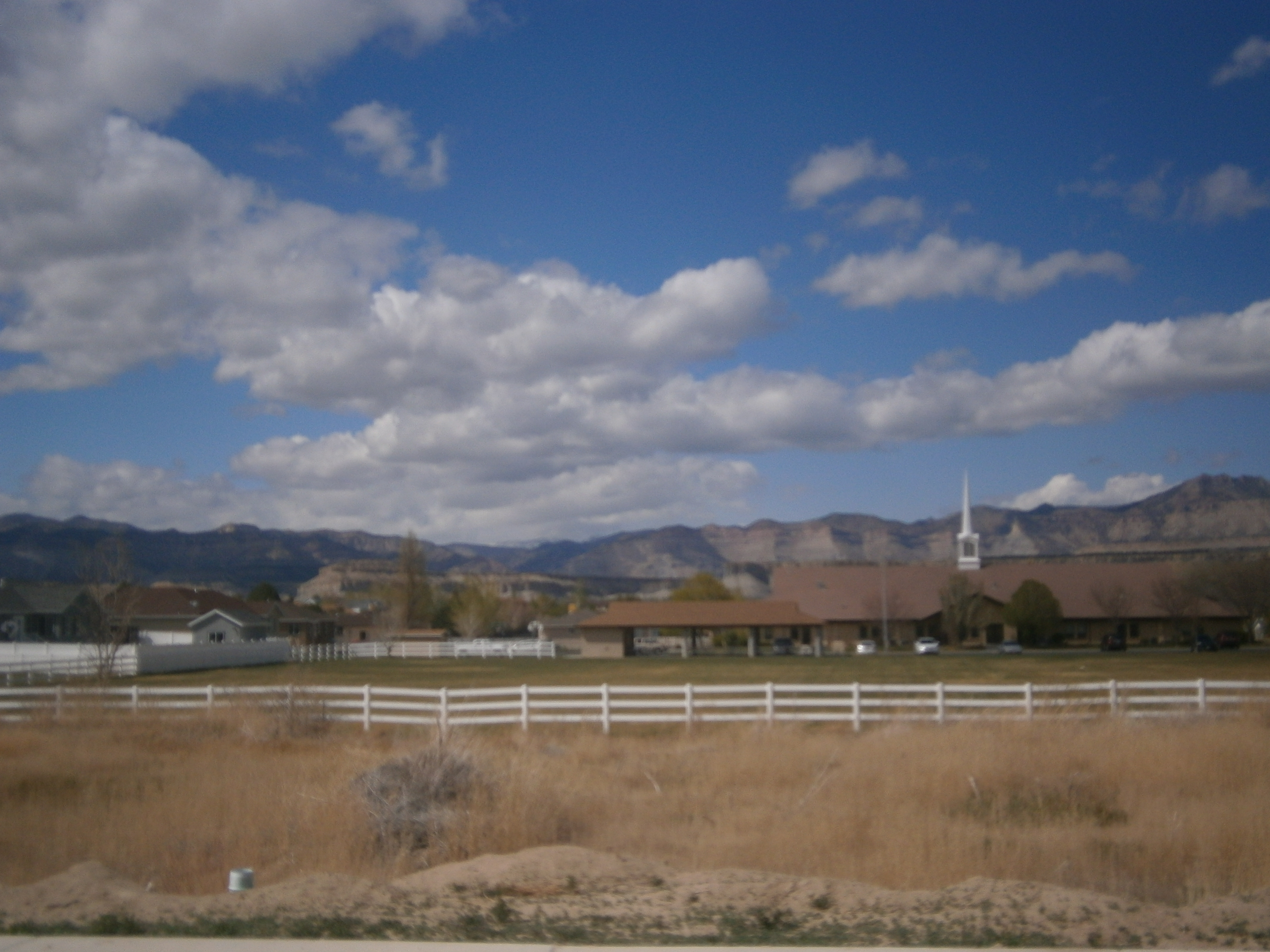
- The local meetinghouse of the Church of Jesus Christ of Latter-day Saints, a landmark in central West Wood.

- Location in Carbon County and the State of Utah
- Coordinates: 39°36′19″N 110°50′33″W
- Country: United States
- State: Utah
- County: Carbon
- Developed: 1975

Area
  - Total: 1.0 sq mi (2.7 km^{2})
  - Land: 1.0 sq mi (2.7 km^{2})
  - Water: 0 sq mi (0.0 km^{2})
- Elevation: 5,617 ft (1,712 m)

Population (2020)
  - Total: 1,066
  - Density: 800/sq mi (307/km^{2})
- Time zone: UTC-7 (Mountain (MST))
  - Summer (DST): UTC-6 (MDT)
- ZIP code: 84501
- Area code: 435
- GNIS feature ID: 2584782

West Wood is a census-designated place (CDP) in Carbon County, Utah, United States. The population was 1,066 at the 2020 census.

== Geography ==
The CDP is just west of Price, the county seat. To the north and northeast, across U.S. Route 6, is Carbonville. The Carbon County Fairgrounds are to the south. To the west are Pinnacle Canyon and Porphyry Bench, part of the Wasatch Plateau. The CDP is named for the Westwood subdivision, a neighborhood to the west of Castleview Hospital. Main streets include Fairgrounds Road and Westwood Boulevard, which passes eastward under the highway to become Utah State Route 55 and 100 North in Price.

Streams flowing through the CDP include Pinnacle Creek and the privately owned Carbon Canal. This is a naturally swampy area with a high water table, and residents have periodic problems with flooding.

According to the United States Census Bureau, the West Wood CDP has a total area of 1.0 square mile (2.7 km^{2}), all land.

== History ==
The land west of Price was a sparsely populated rural area until the Westwood subdivision was developed beginning in 1975.

The opening of Castleview Hospital in 1980 brought more people to West Wood. Additional neighborhoods have been built over the years, and planning for West Wood's future is an important issue in Carbon County government.

== Demographics ==
Historical population
Census	Pop.	Note	%±
2010	844		—
2020	1,066		26.3%

As of the census of 2010, there were 844 people, 258 households, and 225 families residing in the CDP. There were 269 housing units, of which 258 were occupied. The racial makeup of the population was 96.7% White, 0.4% American Indian and Alaska Native, 0.2% Asian, 0.5% Native Hawaiian and Other Pacific Islander, 1.1% from some other race, and 1.2% from two or more races. Hispanic or Latino of any race were 6.3% of the population.

There were 258 households, out of which 48.1% had children under the age of 18 living with them, and 78.7% had married couples living together. 12.8% of all households were made up of individuals, and 5.8% had someone living alone who was 65 years of age or older. The average household size was 3.27, and the average family size was 3.58.

The population was 53.1% male, and the median age was 33.7 years.

== See also ==
- List of census-designated places in Utah
