= List of census-designated places in Utah =

This article lists census-designated places (CDPs) in the U.S. state of Utah. At the 2010 census, there were 81 CDPs in Utah. That number dropped to 79 in 2016 when first Dutch John then Millcreek incorporated, and to 74 when five in Salt Lake County became metro townships. As of the 2020 census, Utah has 77 CDPs.

== Census-designated places ==
CDP	Population	County
Aneth	427	San Juan
Avon	390	Cache
Benjamin	1,196	Utah
Benson	1,492	Cache
Beryl Junction	161	Iron
Bluebell	278	Duchesne
Bonanza	0	Uintah
Cache	38	Cache
Carbonville	1,383	Carbon
Central	656	Washington
Clear Creek	12	Carbon
Cove	494	Cache
Dammeron Valley	871	Washington
Deseret	327	Millard
Dugway	342	Tooele
East Basin	3,023	Summit
Echo	60	Summit
Eden	690	Weber
Elberta	180	Utah
Enterprise	575	Morgan
Flaming Gorge	72	Daggett
Fort Duchesne	546	Uintah
Fremont	167	Wayne
Garden	240	Rich
Granite	1,076	Salt Lake
Halchita	273	San Juan
Halls Crossing	4	San Juan
Hobble Creek	169	Utah
Hoytsville	702	Summit
Jensen	372	Uintah
Kenilworth	200	Carbon
La Sal	348	San Juan
Lake Shore	802	Utah
Lapoint	170	Uintah
Liberty	1,522	Weber
Maeser	4,081	Uintah
Marion	676	Summit
Mexican Hat	21	San Juan
Modena	15	Iron
Montezuma Creek	284	San Juan
Mountain Green	4,231	Morgan
Navajo Mountain	379	San Juan
Neola	491	Duchesne
Newcastle	330	Iron
Oasis	58	Millard
Oquirrh	10,390	Salt Lake County
Oljato–Monument Valley	682	San Juan
Ophir	24	Tooele
Palmyra	443	Utah
Peoa	249	Summit
Peter	623	Cache
Pine Valley	249	Washington
Randlett	184	Uintah
Riverside	971	Box Elder
Samak	93	Summit
Silver Summit	1,694	Summit
Snyderville	6,744	Summit
South Willard	1,840	Box Elder
Spanish Valley	529	San Juan
Spring Glen	1,054	Carbon
Spring Lake	528	Utah
Stansbury Park	9,851	Tooele
Summit	170	Iron
Summit Park	8,820	Summit
Sundance	113	Utah
Sutherland	147	Millard
Teasdale	140	Wayne
Thatcher	807	Box Elder
Thompson Springs	34	Grand
Timber Lakes	866	Wasatch
Tselakai Dezza	95	San Juan
Veyo	586	Washington
Wanship	423	Summit
West Mountain	1,250	Utah
West Wood	1,066	Carbon
White Mesa	178	San Juan
Whiterocks	221	Uintah
Wolf Creek	1,645	Weber
Woodland	375	Summit

== See also ==
- List of municipalities in Utah
