= Carbon Canal =

Irrigation canal in Utah, United States

Coordinates: 39°32′55″N 110°48′11″W

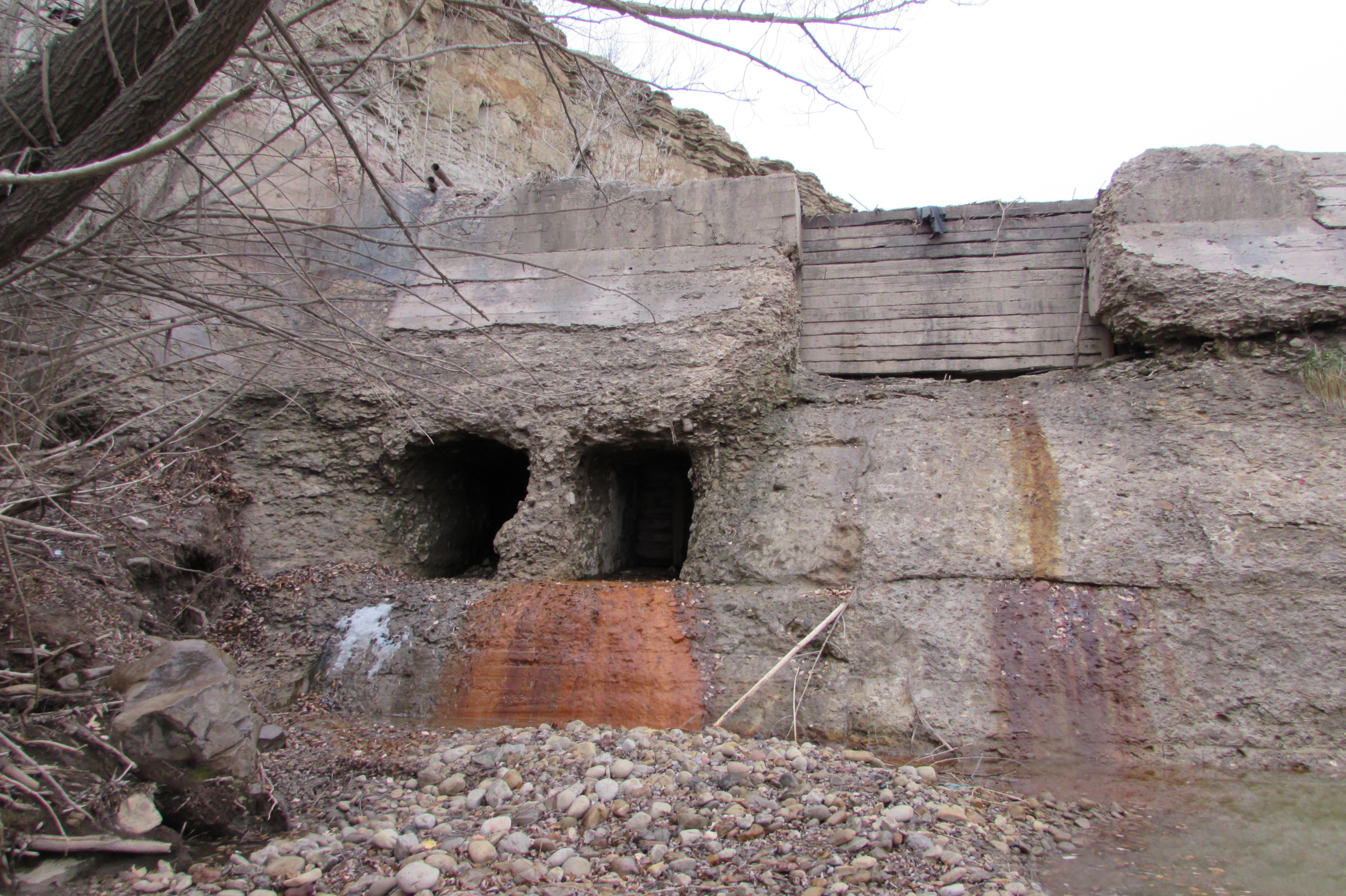
Diversion weir on the Price River, 2016. The two holes at lower left are the original water bypass holes used during construction of the diversion ca. 1908.

The Carbon Canal is an irrigation canal in the central portion of Utah, United States. The canal was constructed by the Carbon Canal Company between 1907 and 1909 to provide water to agricultural fields west and south of the Price River.

== Description ==
The Carbon Canal is a 28-mile long canal containing lined and unlined (i.e., earthen) sections. It begins at a weir on the Price River near the Spring Glen turn-off on U.S. Highway 6 and extends through Carbonville and the community of Price into Emery County to a point northeast of Elmo. It contains numerous flumes that carry the canal over rolling terrain.

== History ==
From the beginning of Euro-American settlement in Carbon County, the Price River was one of a few perennial freshwater sources on which pioneers could rely. The river’s drainage was first permanently settled by Mormon pioneers in the late 1870s at Spring Glen. Within three years, other small settlements appeared at Carbonville, Price, Wellington, and Helper. With the exception of Helper, which was established to support trains making the climb over Soldier Summit, these communities depended on agriculture for basic subsistence. Thus, their dependence on freshwater sources—particularly the Price River—for more than culinary water was strong and deep. Crop production on the dry uplands was limited by a lack of facilities to carry water from the river. The first settlers reportedly carried water from the river in wooden barrels and tanks to their fields. This lasted until the settlers dug a series of small ditches to convey irrigation water to their fields.

The ditches proved generally sufficient to serve the needs of the limited settler population until 1883, when the Denver & Rio Grande Western (D&RGW) Railroad was completed through Utah. The railroad passed through the Price River communities on its way north through Spanish Fork Canyon and on to the Wasatch Front. The completion of the railroad transformed the communities from isolated farm towns to a booming railroad region almost overnight. The arrival of the railroad coincided with the discovery of vast coal reserves in the area, and within a few years, the communities of the Price River bustled with hundreds of miners, railroad men, and entrepreneurs, forever changing the sleepy Mormon bergs into Utah’s mecca of ethnic and religious diversity.

The arrival of the railroad and mining industries saw a concurrent increase in the general settler population of the area as the economy grew sufficiently to allow for a community of supporting commercial enterprises. Most settlers not directly involved in the mining and railroading industries as laborers at least supplemented their household economy with agricultural pursuits if not relying entirely upon them. As the population grew and the demand for irrigation water increased, early ditches reached the limits of their capacity. It soon became clear to area farmers that a more extensive system was needed.

The first large-scale effort to develop an irrigation system occurred in the late 1880s, when the newly formed Price Water Company completed what became known as the Price Canal. The canal, which was fed by a diversion on the Price River near the Spring Glen turn-off on SR-6, was completed in 1888. The canal—still in use today—carries water east and north of the Price River, skirting the northern and eastern parts of the Price community and ending several miles east of Wellington.

=== Initial construction ===
As the new century of the 1900s dawned, area farmers had reached a tipping point—either acquire more water or forever limit agricultural production. By 1906, several representatives of the community joined together to incorporate the Carbon Canal Company (known over the years by other names). In August of that year, the company, represented by R. W. Crocket, applied to the State of Utah for water rights on the Price River for the purpose of constructing a canal that would carry irrigation water to lands west and south of Price and lands south of Wellington and the river. The water right was granted on August 30, 1906 and received final approval in March 1907.

The Certificate of Water Rights allocated 125 cubic feet per second (cfs) of Price River water to the Carbon Canal Company. According to the certificate, the diverting works on the river were to comprise “a concrete diversion dam … and a canal measuring 149,737 ft. long, 5 to 18 ft. wide on top, 4 to 12 ft. wide in the bottom, having an effective depth from 2 to 6 ft.” The length of the canal would carry it through the southern part of Carbon County and into the now-abandoned northern Emery County town of Victor. The diversion dam was to be located roughly 4 miles north of Price. The water right granted to the Carbon Canal Company provided for agricultural water use through the system between April 1 and September 30 each year “to irrigate 7,973.46 acres of land…” The certificate also allowed the company to divert up to 25 cfs from October 1 and March 31 each year for “domestic and culinary purposes” as well as the winter watering of domestic livestock.

Work on the Carbon Canal began shortly after the granting of the water right. By January 1908, the Emery County Progress newspaper reported that work on the canal was “well under way” by the firm of Snow, Waterman and Williams of Spanish Fork, Utah. The newspaper noted that numerous construction camps had been established along the proposed route of the canal and 100 men and 60 livestock teams were on-site. Lumber and cement were reportedly being brought in by rail to Helper and then transported to the work sites, presumably by wagon teams or truck teams. No other information could be found regarding the initial construction of the canal. The canal was completed in 1909 and included six wooden flumes—Gordon Creek, Garley Wash, Pinnacle Wash, Drunkard’s Wash, Miller Creek, and Olsen’s Wash—and a 280-foot tunnel. The flume at Olsen’s Wash was later replaced with an undershoot.

=== Expanding the irrigation network ===
Farmers in the area then constructed a network of smaller ditches to carry water from the canal to their agricultural lands, including fields south of the Price River. The completion of the canal, with its weir upstream of the community of Price and its lack of diversions south of Wellington, finally provided a relatively reliable supply of irrigation water to farmlands south of the Price River. The irrigation water supply to Wellington was supplemented by water from the Price Canal, a 5.5-mile extension of which was completed into Wellington the same year as the completion of the Carbon Canal and irrigated lands north of the river. Because the Price Canal had many diversions and water users along its route to Wellington, the water supply was often lower than anticipated—upstream users having used more water than their allocated water right.

The first major effort to impound water on the Price River drainage had started in 1896 with the forming of the Mammoth Reservoir Company. The company was specifically organized to develop water storage facilities in the mountains northwest of Price, at the site of present-day Scofield Reservoir. Shortly thereafter, several farmers in Sanpete County acquired the reservoir company’s water rights to allow them to divert water to their lands. In 1902, they sold their water rights to the Irrigated Lands Company, which began construction of the Mammoth Dam in 1907. In 1911, the Irrigated Lands Company reorganized as Price River Irrigation Company. On June 25, 1917, the partially completed dam collapsed, releasing 11,000 acre-feet of water downstream and causing an estimated $1 million in flood damage throughout the drainage. Shortly thereafter, the Price River Irrigation Company abandoned the project altogether. Still needing water storage in the region, the Price River Water Conservation District (PRWCD) formed in 1921. The PRWCD oversaw the construction of the Scofield Dam between 1925 and 1926, funding it through a bonding effort. The PRWCD contracted with a number of ditch companies to deliver reservoir water through their canals.

=== Reconstructing the flumes ===
As the Carbon Canal continued to provide irrigation water to southern Carbon County and northern Emery County, the canal structure began to degrade from the use. Lacking deep financial reserves, the canal company applied for a loan from the state land board (part of the present-day Department of Natural Resources) to complete much needed repairs. In 1926, the land board authorized a loan of $20,000 to the canal company, with $5,000 of the funding to be used to replace the wooden sidehill flume at Drunkard’s Wash (i.e., Drunkard’s Creek) with a concrete-lined canal resting on newly placed earthen fill. Additional work to be conducted under the loan included “tearing out the sluice gate at what is known as Sand wash” and replacing it with a series of dykes and iron pipes. Work at the flume commenced in September 1926, after the end of the irrigation season.

One caveat of the loan from the state land board was that all work conducted with the funding had to be overseen by the Utah State Engineer, George M. Bacon, and according to his repair plan. It appears, however, that such oversight and adherence to a plan not of their making did not sit well with the board of the canal company, despite their signing off on the requirement in the loan agreement. Within a few days of starting the repair work at Drunkard’s Wash, the canal company (known at that time as the Carbon County Land and Water Company), sent a telegraph message to the state engineer’s office protesting the plan of repair outlined by Bacon and stating that they would not allow any further expenditure of loan funds on the work until such time as they had been granted a meeting with the state land board to discuss their objections to the repair plans.

The dispute between the canal company, the state land board, and the state engineer roiled for nearly two months, as the canal company proceeded with repairs according to their own plans—ignoring those of the state engineer—and the state engineer condemning the work. State Engineer Bacon contended the work done by the canal company violated the terms of the loan agreement and jeopardized the ability of the canal to provide irrigators with reliable water in the upcoming irrigation season. The dispute went so far as to result in Bacon withholding “the last payroll for work done” until the state land board had resolved the issue and provided him with written direction to approve the expenditure. The land board appears to have attempted to resolve the dispute by asking Bacon to adopt the canal company’s repair plan over the one he himself had developed, but Bacon had declined, presumably due to specific engineering concerns though Bacon himself would note that the work at Drunkard’s Wash “looks like a first class job.”

As the impasse continued, the canal company had reached a point of no return in terms of physical changes to the canal. By early November, the entire original flume at Drunkard’s Wash had been demolished and the earthen embankment upon which the new concrete-lined canal would rest had been constructed. The cost for that work had already reached $7,000, two-thousand dollars more than the original allocation under the loan. Bacon noted that no one involved on the canal company’s side could provide an estimate of the final cost to complete the canal section in question. Elsewhere, the canal company had commenced on the construction of a new concrete flume at Gordon Creek. Roughly one week later, on November 11, 1926, the News Advocate newspaper reported that a resolution of the dispute was reached. Ultimately, the newspaper stated, the canal company board would accept the repair plan outlined by Bacon and the loan requirement that all work be approved by him. The canal company board agreed not to interfere with Bacon as the work progressed, and all foremen of work crews were directed to take “orders only from the state engineer.” As a final component of the resolution, Bacon was absolved on any responsibility or liability for the work done on the Drunkard’s Wash flume. The canal company board did request, however, that Bacon review, and depending on his findings, approve the work on the flume. They agreed that if Bacon did not approve the work, they would not use funding from the state land board loan to cover the cost but would, instead, raise funds with a special assessment (a fee) on the water users. Two weeks later, on November 25, 1926, the News Advocate reported that water had been turned into the Drunkard’s Wash section of the canal and initial indications were that the work completed there was satisfactory.

Financial challenges continued to plague the canal company. Flooding in August 1927 caused severe damage to many of the flumes and other structures along the canal. Lacking sufficient in-house funds for the repair work, the company sought another loan from the state land board—this time for $51,000. The Salt Lake Telegram reported that the state was willing to authorize the loan, adding it to an existing $67,000 debt owed by the canal company on prior loans so long as an existing second mortgage held by the Utah Savings and Trust Company was paid first. A bonding group associated with the canal company paid Utah Savings and Trust the sum of $18,000, clearing the way for the $51,000 loan from the state land board. The loan reportedly brought the total debt owed to the land board by the canal company to $118,000 (the equivalent of approximately $1.65 million in 2017). Repairs commenced shortly after the authorization of the loan with the Whitney-Reynolds Company selected as the contractor. The work, which included cleaning out the entire canal channel, was essentially complete by April 30, 1928, when water was turned into the newly built flumes.

=== Great Depression and World War II development ===
The Great Depression started the year after the flood repairs, and a severe drought gripped Utah beginning in 1931. Across the state, low crop yields, coupled with weak markets, led many water users to default on their payments to canal companies. The Carbon Canal Company appears to have struggled with their continued financial woes, and the State of Utah assumed ownership of the Carbon Canal assets in early 1932 due to the outstanding debt of the canal company. A 1934 Salt Lake Telegram article refers to the canal as the “state controlled Carbon canal (sic)” and notes that the canal company still owes the state $65,000. Despite the challenges, the canal company soldiered on, attempting in 1937 to raise money through an additional assessment on its water users to complete what was referred to as “the Miller Creek flume project.” The project was expected to cost $6,000, but the contribution of labor by the Soil Conservation Service (the modern predecessor to the Natural Resources Conservation Service) reduced the anticipated cost to users to approximately half that amount.

In 1937, the Utah legislature passed a bill to address ownership of the canal. The state proposed that the Price River Water Conservation District (PRWCD), which was formed in 1921 to develop water storage along the Price River, would assume control of the assets from the state. In the same session, the legislature also voted to cancel the reported $140,000 debt owed by the canal company as part of transferring the canal to the PRWCD. It appears from historical meeting minutes that the canal company recovered its ownership of the canal during the 1940s.

Financial difficulties weren’t the only challenge faced by Price River water users during the years of the Great Depression. By the late 1920s, the dam at Scofield was beginning to fail, threatening a catastrophic flood and damage or destruction of extensive mining operations, the D&RGW railroad, and other facilities. Also during this time, the U.S. Bureau of Reclamation (BOR) began planning the Gooseberry Project—which would replace the Scofield Dam and reservoir—to irrigate lands in Carbon County and Sanpete County. The announcement of these plans kicked off decades of litigation that continued for more than 80 years. The project has yet to be constructed.

Company records indicate the 1940s were largely spent repairing or replacing components of the canal system. This included repair or replacement of the Drunkard’s Wash flume around 1944 or 1945. Additional improvements during the period appear from company records to have included construction of a drop structure known as the Marsing Drop, changes to the Gordon Creek flume, and consideration was given to the installation of 153 Parshall flumes along the canal.

Upstream from the canal, much activity was underway during the 1940s to address the challenges at the Scofield Dam. As noted above, the dam had started to deteriorate significantly during the late 1920s. The outlet tunnel had failed numerous times, and an embankment was eroding away. On May 21, 1928, a beaver tunneling into the dam nearly caused the entire dam to fail. In an emergency effort to decrease the pressure on the dam, the spillway was lowered several feet; it was lowered another 7.5 feet a few years later and then again in 1942.

The looming failure of the Scofield Dam posed a national threat as the U.S. entered World War II. Wartime demand for the mineral resources of Carbon County and the transport power of the D&RGW railroad placed these resources in the national spotlight. The potential loss or temporary shut-down of the mines and railroad created an unacceptable risk to the U.S. war effort at home, prompting the federal government to get involved. The complicated web of water rights to the existing reservoir and Price River watershed created numerous challenges to addressing the issues as the Scofield Dam. The situation ultimately prompted then-President Franklin Roosevelt to authorize construction of a new Scofield Dam project on June 24, 1943 under the provisions of the Water Conservation and Utilization Act of 1939. Construction of the new dam began September 13, 1943 and was sufficiently advanced by November 1945 for water to be impounded in the reservoir. Final construction was completed in October 1947. On April 1, 1949, the Carbon Water Conservancy District, which was formed in 1943 and which signed a repayment contract with the BOR for $216,000, assumed responsibility for the maintenance and operation of the Scofield Dam.

=== The Post-War Period ===
No major system upgrades appear to have been carried out on the Carbon Canal during the remainder of the historical period (i.e., up to ca. 1970). Routine maintenance and flood prevention projects were carried out, including revetment work done in 1953 at Gibbs Cut, south of the Carbon Country Club, to protect the Carbon Canal from damage. The revetments consisted of 65-pound steel rails and cedar timbers. In 1957, the canal company borrowed $4,000 (at 7% interest) from the Carbon Emery Bank of Price to pay for raising the flume and replacing the abutments where the Carbon Canal crosses Pinnacle Wash. The debt was to be repaid by November 1 of the following year. In 1966, the canal company board introduced a resolution to borrow additional funds to partner with the Carbon Country Club to enlarge and re-align the course of the Price River directly below the diversion point of the Price Canal to address anticipated flood damage to the Carbon Canal diverting works a short distance downstream. It is unclear if that work was ever completed. Two years later, in 1968, the flume at Drunkard’s Wash was lined with fiberglass to prevent water leakage and address other damage, some of which was apparently caused by the use of the flume as a swimming location by local youth.

Operations during the 1950s included at least two water use agreements entered into by the Carbon Canal Company to supply a portion of its allocated water rights in the Price River to other parties. Specifically, in 1956, the canal company entered into a water use agreement with Utah Power & Light (UP&L) to furnish water to UP&L’s power plant at Castle Gate (i.e., the Carbon Plant). The canal company was to provide up to 1600 acre feet of “direct flow of water” to the plant. The water was to be furnished via the canal company’s existing water rights on the Price River and not from the Carbon Canal itself. UP&L paid an initial sum of $10,000 for use of the water and an annual fee based on the specific amount of water used that year. The price per acre foot of water used by UP&L was set at $4.00. In December of the following year, 1957, the canal company entered into a short-term agreement with the Shell Oil Company to provide water from their canal to the oil company’s drilling operations in the “Miller Creek Area” until the start of the 1958 irrigation season. The oil company was to receive 1 acre foot of water per day for the daily rate of $20.00.

The 1960s saw the Carbon Canal Company in the throes of a series of lawsuits over individual water rights, company water rights, and water rights priorities with a number of different parties. Much of the litigation centered around the proposed Gooseberry Project and the potential diversion of water from the Price River drainage to Sanpete County. Lawsuits over the proposed Gooseberry Project began almost as soon as the project was proposed by the Bureau of Reclamation in the 1930s. Over the ensuing decades, various water users, including the Carbon Canal Company, had filed suits over the distribution and priority of water rights in the Price River. The lawsuits filed by the canal company appear, at least in part from available documents, to have focused on procedural failings in the granting of water rights to users in Sanpete County, particularly the Sanpete Water Users Association (SPWUA). In 1960, the Utah Supreme Court upheld an earlier district court decision, which had been challenged by the Carbon Canal Company, allowing additional time for potential Sanpete County water users of the proposed Gooseberry Project to develop plans for storage facilities and water tunnels to carry irrigation water from the Price River drainage into the Sanpitch River drainage. A few years later, in 1965, the Carbon Canal Company filed a lawsuit against the Cottonwood–Gooseberry Irrigation Company and others over water rights to the Price River drainage. This case, as with the 1960 court decision, did not turn out in favor of the canal company. In a 1967 Utah Supreme Court decision on cases of the Carbon Canal Company and the Price River Water Improvement District (PRWID) against the SPWUA, the court found in favor of the canal company that their water right claim of 1937 had priority over a 1924 claim by the SPWUA because the SPWUA had missed deadlines for filing their claim and making subsequent filings. Unfortunately for the Carbon Canal Company, the litigation over the Gooseberry Project continued well into the modern era.

Throughout its history, the Carbon Canal has been a vital component of rural agricultural life in Carbon County. To some, the canal is nothing more than a simple ditch in the ground. But to many, its trenches and dugways, its flumes and diversions, are a constant reminder of tremendous effort of the settlers of the early 1900s to bring water to the dry lands of the area and sustain an agricultural way of life for generations to come. The canal remains in use today, continuing its more than 100-year-old job of delivering water to a parched land.

=== Modern era ===
Over its long history, the Carbon Canal has quietly and consistently done its job with the help of Carbon Canal Company, which maintains and repairs the aging infrastructure. Periodic flood events, particularly flash floods, have taken their toll on the canal and often overwhelm the diversion structure on the Price River. To address this issue, the canal company, in cooperation with the Natural Resources Conservation Service, is embarking upon an effort to repair and replace the diversion dam and intake structure at the headwaters of the Carbon Canal. This effort, which should be completed in 2018, will leave portions of the original dam in place. These remains will stand as a reminder to future generations of the efforts of early pioneers to harness the water of the Price River and create an agricultural industry in their Carbon County settlements.
