= Utah State Route 157 =

State highway in Utah, United States

State Route 157
- SR-157 highlighted in red

Route information
- Maintained by UDOT
- Length: 5.189 mi (8.351 km)
- Existed: 1933–present

Major junctions
- West end: US 6 / US 191 in Helper
- East end: 1st Avenue in Kenilworth

Location
- Country: United States
- State: Utah

Highway system
- Utah State Highway System; Interstate; US; State; Minor; Scenic
← SR-156	→ SR-158

Utah State Route 157 (SR-157) is a state highway in Carbon County in the U.S. state of Utah. Spanning just over 5 miles (8.0 km), it connects Helper and Spring Glen with Kenilworth to the northeast.

== Route description ==
State Route 157 begins on US-6/US-191 at the Poplar Street/Hill Street interchange in the city of Helper. From there the route travels east 0.2 miles (0.32 km) along Poplar Street before turning south onto South Main Street. The route then continues south 1.2 miles (1.9 km) along South Main Street (which becomes North Spring Glen Road) toward Spring Glen, parallel to US-6/US-191, before turning east onto Kenilworth Road (initially 4500 North). The route then travels east-northeast along Kenilworth Road about 3.3 miles (5.3 km) to Kenilworth, turning north onto Main Street for about 0.2 miles (0.32 km), which then turns back to the west for the last 0.2 miles (0.32 km), ending at Main Street and 1st Avenue.

== History ==
State Route 157 was established in 1933 as connecting what was then SR-8 (now US-6) between Helper and Spring Glen with Kenilworth. In 1953, the state legislature designated State Route 244 in 1953 as a loop off US-6 (then also US-50) in Helper, running along Poplar Street and Main Street. The west end of SR-157 was extended north to SR-244 in Helper in 1961. In 2013, SR-244 was removed from the State Highway System, but the section of the former state route along Poplar Street (from US-6/US-191 to South Main Street) was added to SR-157. The result is the current alignment of SR-157 (south from Helper to Kenilworth road, thence northeast to Kenilworth).

The entirety of the former SR-244 designation, which includes the Poplar Street segment of modern SR-157, remains signed as U.S. Route 6 Business.

== Major intersections ==
The entire route is in Carbon County.

Location	mi	km	Destinations	Notes
Helper	0.000	0.000	US 6 / US 191	Western terminus; west end of US-6 Business concurrency
Helper	0.183	0.295	US 6 Bus. (South Main Street)	Former SR-244; east end of US-6 Business concurrency
Spring Glen	1.443	2.322	SR-139 (North Spring Glen Road)	
Kenilworth	5.189	8.351	1st Avenue	Eastern terminus
1.000 mi = 1.609 km; 1.000 km = 0.621 mi: Concurrency terminus
