= Park City High School =

Public school in Utah, United States

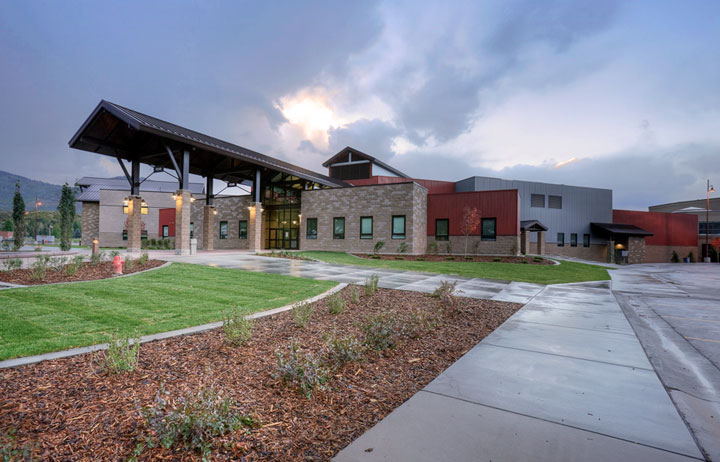
- Park City High School, July 2012

Location
- 1750 Kearns Boulevard; Park City, Summit County, Utah 84060; United States; 40.66711°N 111.4970°W

Information
- Type: Public high school
- Established: February 1928
- Principal: Caleb Fine
- Teaching staff: 65.49 (FTE)
- Enrollment: 1,222 (2023–2024)
- Student to teacher ratio: 18.66
- Campus: Urban; 35 acres (0.14 km^{2})
- Colors: Red, white & black
- Sports: 4A, Region X
- Nickname: Miners
- Website: pchs.pcschools.us

Park City High School is a public high school located at 1750 Kearns Boulevard in Park City, Utah, United States. It is one of eight public schools in the Park City School District and serves ninth, tenth, eleventh, and twelfth graders.

The district's service area, and therefore the high school's attendance boundary, includes the portion of Park City in Summit County (almost all of Park City), the census designated places of Summit Park and Snyderville, the vast majority of the Silver Summit CDP, and a portion of the East Basin CDP.

== History ==
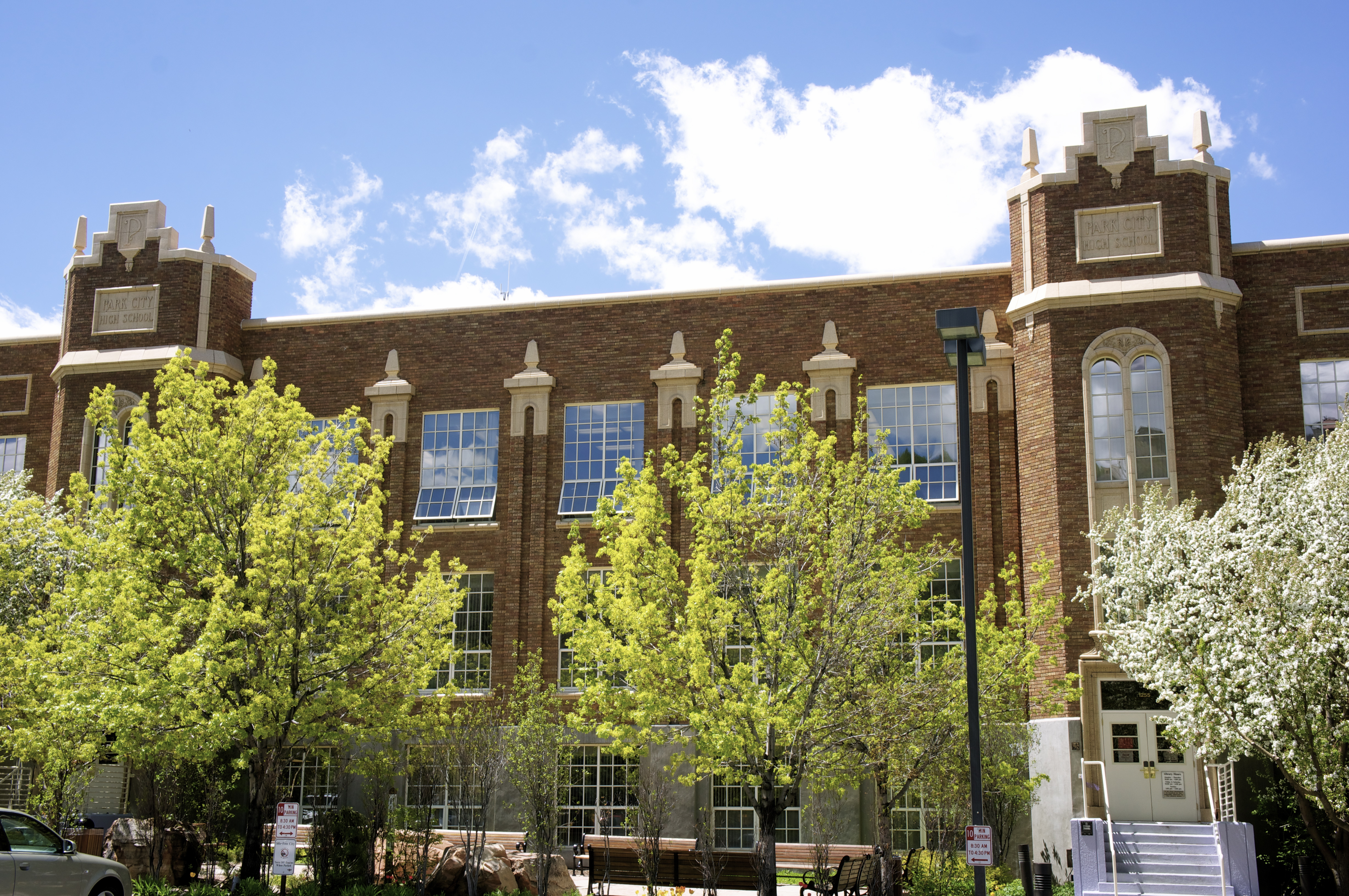
The original high school was restored in 1993 and is currently the Park City Library and Education center.

Park City High School was originally located at 1255 Park Avenue in Park City. It was constructed in February 1928 at a cost of $200,000 (equivalent to $3.75 million in 2025) and was a modified Collegiate Gothic style brick building with three levels. The building was abandoned in 1981, when a new high school was constructed on Kearns Boulevard. The original building has since been restored and serves as the Park City Library and the Jim Santy auditorium, which hosts screenings during annual Sundance Film Festival and the Park City Film Series. The 1981 Kearns complex remains in service and has been partially updated by Salt Lake City based architectural firm VCBO. The current high school stands on a site of 35 acres (14 ha) and consists of three levels.

== Academics ==
=== Recognition ===
In 2011, Park City High School was named one of the best 200 high schools in the United States by The Daily Beast, a website published by Newsweek magazine, Park City's Academic Decathlon team has consistently won State and had many individual medalists since the 1980s.

=== Electronic integration ===
In 2012, Park City High School adopted a one-to-one personal computer program. Teachers and students use the learning management system Canvas for information and assignments. Canvas is provided by Instructure, a Utah-based software company.

== Building ==
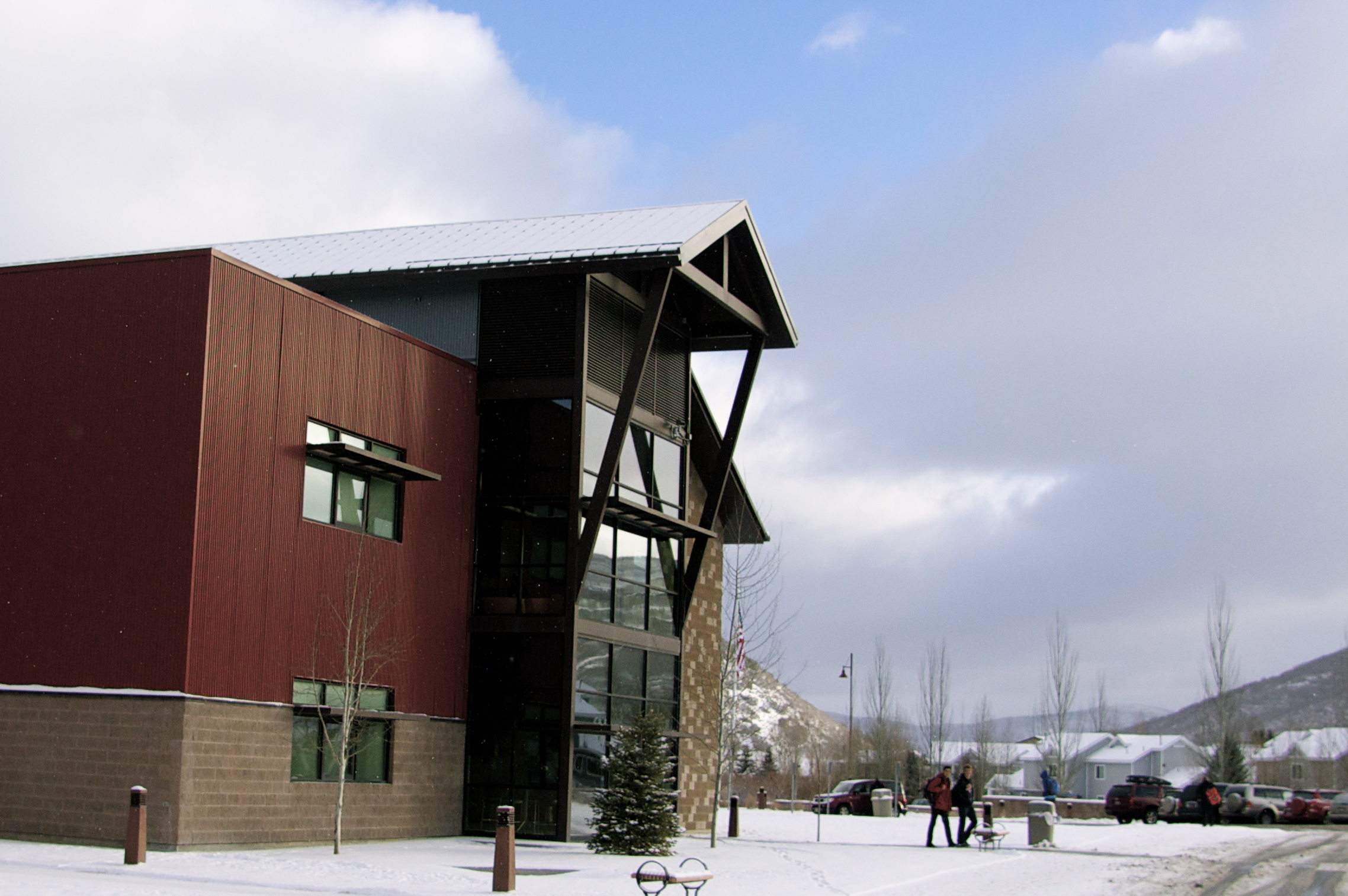
Some of Park City High School's architectural cues are reminiscent of the region's historic silver mines.

Park City High School is a multi-level contemporary style complex. Since its renovation in 2008, the school has over 260,000 square feet (24,000 m^{2}) of total floor area. The building was primarily amended along at its front, including the school lunchroom, the primary classroom wings, and the administrative offices. The reconstruction resulted in improvements such as a more spacious floor plan and updated building specifications.

The classrooms mirror other Utah schools with large glass windows and integrated multimedia systems. According to VCBO, the renovation "results in the entire complex appearing as one cohesive facility." The building holds a Silver Rating by the Leadership in Energy and Environmental Design standards.

It has won four awards for its design, including the 2010 Outstanding Project Award for Green School Building Design by Leading By Design.

== Sports ==
PCHS won their third straight Utah high school state championship of Boys' Hockey (January 29, 2026, 7–1 win over Brighton).

PCHS were state champions in Boys Hockey in 2024, 2022, 2021 and 2020.

They were Boys Basketball state champions in class 1A in 1980.

PCHS were state champions in Boys Cross Country in class 2A in 1989 and 1990, and in class 3A in 2008. Mike James was individual state champion in 1990 and 1991. Ben Saarel was individual state champion in 2010, 2011, and 2012.

PCHS were state champions in Girls Cross Country in class 2A in 1992 and in class 3A in 2002, 2003, 2004, 2005,2006, 2008, 2009, 2010, 2011, 2012, 2013, and 2014. Cara Weiser was individual state champion in 1993 and 1994.The team currently holds the two best combined team times in class 3A history.

PCHS were state champions in Boys Golf in class 2A in 1991 and 1992; class 3A in 1997, 2004, 2008, 2009, 2010, 2011, 2012, 2013, 2014, 2015, and 2016; and in class 4A in 2017 and 2018. They have had ten individual medalists in the state championships as well.

PCHS has had one individual medalist in two Girls Golf state championships (Sami Crouch in 2009 and 2010).

PCHS were state champions in Gymnastics in class 1A in 1980.

PCHS were state champions in Girls Lacrosse in its first year as a UHSAA sport in 2021 (in Division A).

PCHS were state champions in Boys Soccer in class 3A in 1994, 1995, 2001, 2004, 2006, 2008, and 2009.

PCHS were state champions in Girls Soccer in class 3A in 1997, 1999, 2000, 2004, and 2005.

PCHS were state champions in Boys Swimming in class 3A in 2001, 2010, 2012, 2014, 2015, 2016, and 2017. Dusty Ragland is currently tied for the state 3A record in the 50-yard freestyle. Lucas Hess currently holds the state 3A record in the 200-yard freestyle. Jinwon Bailar currently holds the state 3A record for the 100-yard backstroke. The relay team of Vincent Hess, Lucas Hess, Alex Yokubison, Jinwon Bailar currently holds the state 3A record in the 200-yard freestyle relay. PCHS are the current state champions in both Girls and Boys Swimming in Class 4A (2024–25).

PCHS were state champions in Girls Swimming in class 3A in 1996, 1997,1998, 2002, 2008, 2014, 2015, 2016, and 2017, and in class 4A in 2018. The relay team of Emma Strong-Conklin, Joelle Hess, Katie Hale, Rozie Selznick currently holds the state 3A record in the 200-yard medley relay. The relay team of Siena Senn, Elise Beller, Katie Hale, Rozie Selznick currently holds the state 3A record in the 200-yard freestyle relay.

PCHS were state champions in Boys Tennis in class 1A in 1981, 1982, 1984, and 1985; class 2A in 1987 and 1988; class 3A in 1996, 2000, 2003, 2004, 2005, 2006, and 2012; and class 4A in 2019. Fred Birch was No. 1 singles state champion in 1987 and 1987. Rudy Stankovic was No. 1 singles champion in 1990 and 1991. John Birch was No. 1 singles state champion in 1994 and 1995.

PCHS were state champions in Girls Tennis in class 2A in 1989, 1990, 1991, and 1992; class 3A in 2013, 2015, and 2016; and class 4A in 2017. C. Bettis and P. Rogers were No. 1 doubles state champions in 1991 and 1992. Jenny Vance was No. 1 singles champion in 1990 and 1991.

PCHS were state champions in Boys Track & Field in class 2A in 1991 and 1992. Ben Saarel currently holds state 3A records in the 800m, 1,600m, and 3,200m runs.

PCHS were state champions in Girls Track & Field in class 3A in 2005, 2010, 2013, and 2014. The 4 × 800 m relay team of Klaire Kovar, Kaylee Hale, Chloe Shewell, Leah Yaeger, currently holds the 5A state record. Chrissy Glasmann currently holds the 3A state record in the New Javelin discipline.

PCHS were state champions in Volleyball in class 4A in 2017.

== Notable alumni ==
- Ashley Farquharson, Olympic Luge athlete
- Josh Chin, Wall Street Journal reporter and deputy chief of China bureau. Co-author "Surveillance State: Inside China’s Quest to Launch a New Era of Social Control"
- Roberto Linck, former player of Major League Soccer and executive producer of the film Buddy.
- Parker Morin, professional baseball player and coach
- Joe Pack, freestyle skier, 2002 Winter Olympics silver medalist
- Ryan Seaman, former drummer of I Dont Know How but They Found Me and former tenured drummer of Falling in Reverse
- Lionel Williams, multimedia artist and musician under the name Vinyl Williams
- Michael Self, racing driver
- Barry Sims, football player
- Lindsey Van, female ski jumper, brought female ski jumping to the Olympics
- Haley Batten, an American cross-country mountain biker, who won silver in the Olympics
- Grant Sanderson, author of mathematics YouTube channel 3Blue1Brown with over 7 million subscribers as of 2025.
- Jonathan Ruiz, Vocalist of Pastel Faces

== Notable show appearances ==
- The Amazing Race, Season 8
- Cloud 9, 2014 movie

== See also ==
- List of high schools in Utah
- Northeastern Utah Educational Services
