= East Basin, Utah =

- Census-designated place
- Location within Utah Location within the United States
- Coordinates: 40°44′10″N 111°28′15″W
- Country: United States
- State: Utah
- County: Summit

Area
  - Total: 9.01 sq mi (23.33 km^{2})
  - Land: 9.00 sq mi (23.31 km^{2})
  - Water: 0.0077 sq mi (0.02 km^{2})
- Elevation: 6,513 ft (1,985 m)

Population (2020)
  - Total: 3,023
- Time zone: UTC-7 (Mountain (MST))
  - Summer (DST): UTC-6 (MDT)
- ZIP Code: 84098 (Park City)
- Area code: 435
- FIPS code: 49-20850
- GNIS feature ID: 2807121

East Basin is an unincorporated area and census-designated place (CDP) in Summit County, Utah, United States. It was first listed as a CDP prior to the 2020 census, of which the population was 3,023.

It is in the southwest part of the county, bordered to the northwest by Silver Summit and to the southwest by Snyderville. It is 8 miles (13 km) northeast of Park City. Interstate 80 forms the northwest border of the CDP; the highway leads northeast 15 miles (24 km) to Coalville and west 26 miles (42 km) to Salt Lake City. U.S. Routes 40 and U.S. Route 189 turn south from I-80 at Silver Creek Junction along the northwest edge of the CDP; the U.S. highways lead south 16 miles (26 km) to Heber City.

East Basin is drained by Silver Creek, which flows north to the Weber River, carving a canyon followed by Interstate 80.

== Demographics ==
=== 2020 census ===
As of the 2020 census, East Basin had a population of 3,023. The median age was 41.7 years. 25.3% of residents were under the age of 18 and 10.9% of residents were 65 years of age or older. For every 100 females there were 107.5 males, and for every 100 females age 18 and over there were 107.1 males age 18 and over.

71.8% of residents lived in urban areas, while 28.2% lived in rural areas.

There were 979 households in East Basin, of which 45.3% had children under the age of 18 living in them. Of all households, 72.9% were married-couple households, 9.4% were households with a male householder and no spouse or partner present, and 12.4% were households with a female householder and no spouse or partner present. About 10.5% of all households were made up of individuals and 2.8% had someone living alone who was 65 years of age or older.

There were 1,382 housing units, of which 29.2% were vacant. The homeowner vacancy rate was 0.8% and the rental vacancy rate was 6.3%.

Racial composition as of the 2020 census
Race	Number	Percent
White	2,645	87.5%
Black or African American	13	0.4%
American Indian and Alaska Native	15	0.5%
Asian	39	1.3%
Native Hawaiian and Other Pacific Islander	5	0.2%
Some other race	101	3.3%
Two or more races	205	6.8%
Hispanic or Latino (of any race)	212	7.0%

== Education ==
Different portions of the CDP are in the North Summit School District, the Park City School District, and the South Summit School District. Park City High School is the Park City district's comprehensive high school.
