= Civil township =

Common form of local government

A civil township is a widely used unit of local government in the United States that is subordinate to a county, most often in the northern and midwestern parts of the country. The term town is used in New England, New York, as well as Wisconsin to refer to the equivalent of the civil township in these states; Minnesota uses "town" officially but often uses it and "township" interchangeably. Specific responsibilities and the degree of autonomy vary in each state. Civil townships are distinct from survey townships, but in states that have both, the boundaries often coincide, especially in Indiana, Ohio, and Illinois, and may completely geographically subdivide a county. The U.S. Census Bureau classifies civil townships as minor civil divisions. Currently, there are 20 states with civil townships, including Indiana, Ohio, Illinois, Michigan, Iowa, Minnesota, Wisconsin, Missouri, Kansas, Nebraska, South Dakota, North Dakota, Pennsylvania, and West Virginia (in certain areas).

Township functions are generally overseen by a governing board (the name varies from state to state) and a clerk, trustee, or mayor (in New Jersey and the metro townships of Utah). Township officers frequently include justice of the peace, road commissioner, assessor, and constable, in addition to surveyor. In the 20th century, many townships also added a township administrator or supervisor to the officers as an executive for the board. In some cases, townships run local libraries, senior citizen services, youth services, disabled citizen services, and cemetery services, besides emergency assistance. In some states, a township and a municipality that is coterminous with that township may wholly or partially consolidate their operations.

== Midwestern States ==
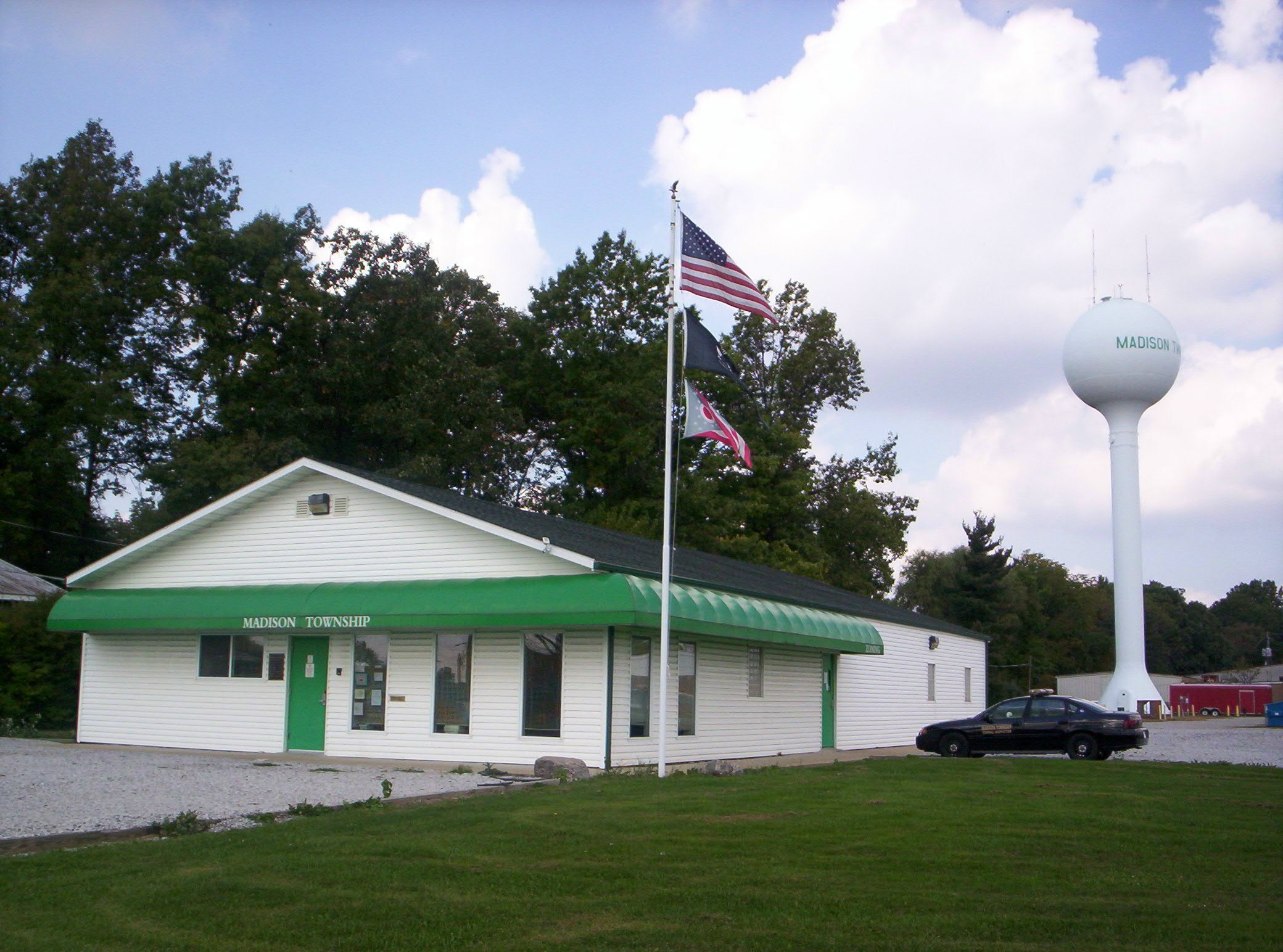
Madison Township Hall in Madison Township, Richland County, Ohio

Depending on the state, the township government has varying degrees of authority.

In the Upper Midwestern states near the Great Lakes, civil townships (known in Michigan as general law townships and in Wisconsin as towns), are often, but not always, overlaid on survey townships. The degree to which these townships are functioning governmental entities varies from state to state and in some cases even within a state. For example, townships in the northern part of Illinois are active in providing public services—such as road maintenance, after-school care, and senior services—whereas townships in southern Illinois frequently delegate these services to the county. Most townships in Illinois also provide services such as snow removal, senior transportation, and emergency services to households residing in unincorporated parts of the county. The townships in Illinois each have a township board, whose board members were formerly called township trustees, and a single township supervisor. In contrast, civil townships in Indiana are operated in a relatively consistent manner statewide and tend to be well organized, with each served by a single township trustee and a three-member board.

Civil townships in these states are generally not incorporated, and nearby cities may annex land in adjoining townships with relative ease. In Michigan, however, general law townships are corporate entities (e.g. they can be the subject of lawsuits), and some can become reformulated as charter townships, a status intended to protect against annexation from nearby municipalities and which grants the township some home rule powers similar to cities. In Wisconsin, civil townships are known as "towns" rather than townships, but they function essentially the same as in neighboring states. In Minnesota, state statute refers to such entities as towns yet requires them to have a name in the form "Name Township". In both documents and conversation, "town" and "township" are used interchangeably. Minnesota townships can be either Non-Urban or Urban (giving the township government greater power), but this is not reflected in the township's name. Similarly, in Ohio, some townships qualify for urban township status, affording limited home rule government. A city or village is overlaid onto a township unless it withdraws by establishing a paper township. Where the paper township does not extend to the city limits, property owners pay taxes for both the township and municipality, though these overlaps are sometimes overlooked by mistake. Ten other states also allow townships and municipalities to overlap.

In Kansas, some civil townships provide services such as road maintenance and fire protection services not provided by the county.

== Northeastern States ==
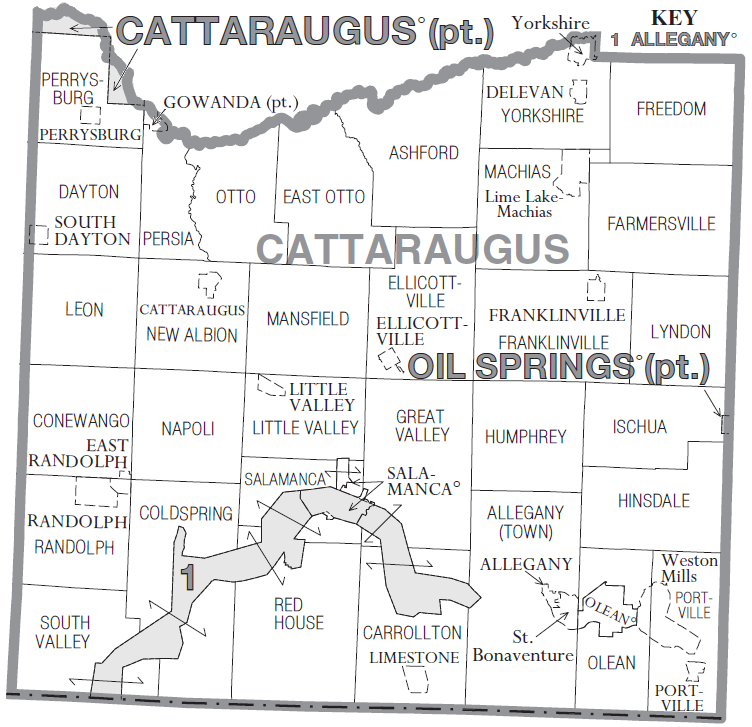
Map of Cattaraugus County, New York showing municipal and town organization

=== New England and New York ===
In New England and New York, states are generally subdivided into towns and cities, which are municipalities that provide most local services. With the exception of a few remote areas of New Hampshire and Vermont and about half of Maine, all of New England lies within the borders of an incorporated municipality. New England has counties, though in southern New England, they are strictly used as dividing lines for judicial systems and statistical purposes, while in northern New England, they often handle other limited functions, such as law enforcement, education and some public facilities in addition to judicial systems. New England also has cities, most of which are towns whose residents have voted to replace the town meeting form of government with a city form. Maine has a third type of township called a plantation, which previously existed in other New England states, that has more limited self-governance than other New England towns.

In portions of Maine, New Hampshire, and Vermont, county subdivisions that are not incorporated are occasionally called townships, or by other terms such as "gore", "grant", "location", or "purchase".

The State of New York is subdivided into counties, which are subdivided into cities and towns—except for New York City, whose five coextensive counties for state government purposes are municipal boroughs for city government purposes (Bronx County/The Bronx, Kings County/Brooklyn, New York County/Manhattan, Queens County/Queens, and Richmond County/Staten Island). As in New England, the term "town" equates to "township" in most other states. Additionally, New Yorkers colloquially use the term "township" to mean "town". Townships and hamlets are unincorporated areas within a town or towns. Because towns are administrative divisions of a county, town boundaries cannot cross county lines. In addition to administrative subdivisions, New York State also has cities. Cities in New York are fully autonomous municipal corporations and, thus, are able to cross county lines and whose governments fully independent of county control.

Finally, New York and Vermont also have villages, which are smaller communities lying within the boundaries of a town that provide additional government services not provided by their parent town, such as sewage, fire, law enforcement, garbage collection, public facilities, water and building code enforcement. In Vermont, most current cities were actually former villages that broke off from their parent town. Connecticut has boroughs and non-consolidated cities, although these communities are not as autonomous as villages in New York and Vermont, and today there are only eight non-consolidated boroughs (plus the community of Groton Long Point) and one non-consolidated city.

=== Pennsylvania and New Jersey ===
A Pennsylvania township is a unit of local government, responsible for services such as police departments, local road and street maintenance. It acts the same as a city or borough. Townships were established based on convenient geographical boundaries and vary in size from six to fifty-two square miles (10–135 km^{2}).

A New Jersey township is similar, in that it is a form of municipal government equal in status to a village, town, borough, or city, and provides similar services to a Pennsylvania township, and varies in size from one-tenth (Shrewsbury Twp.) to one hundred (Jackson Twp.) square miles.

== Southern States ==
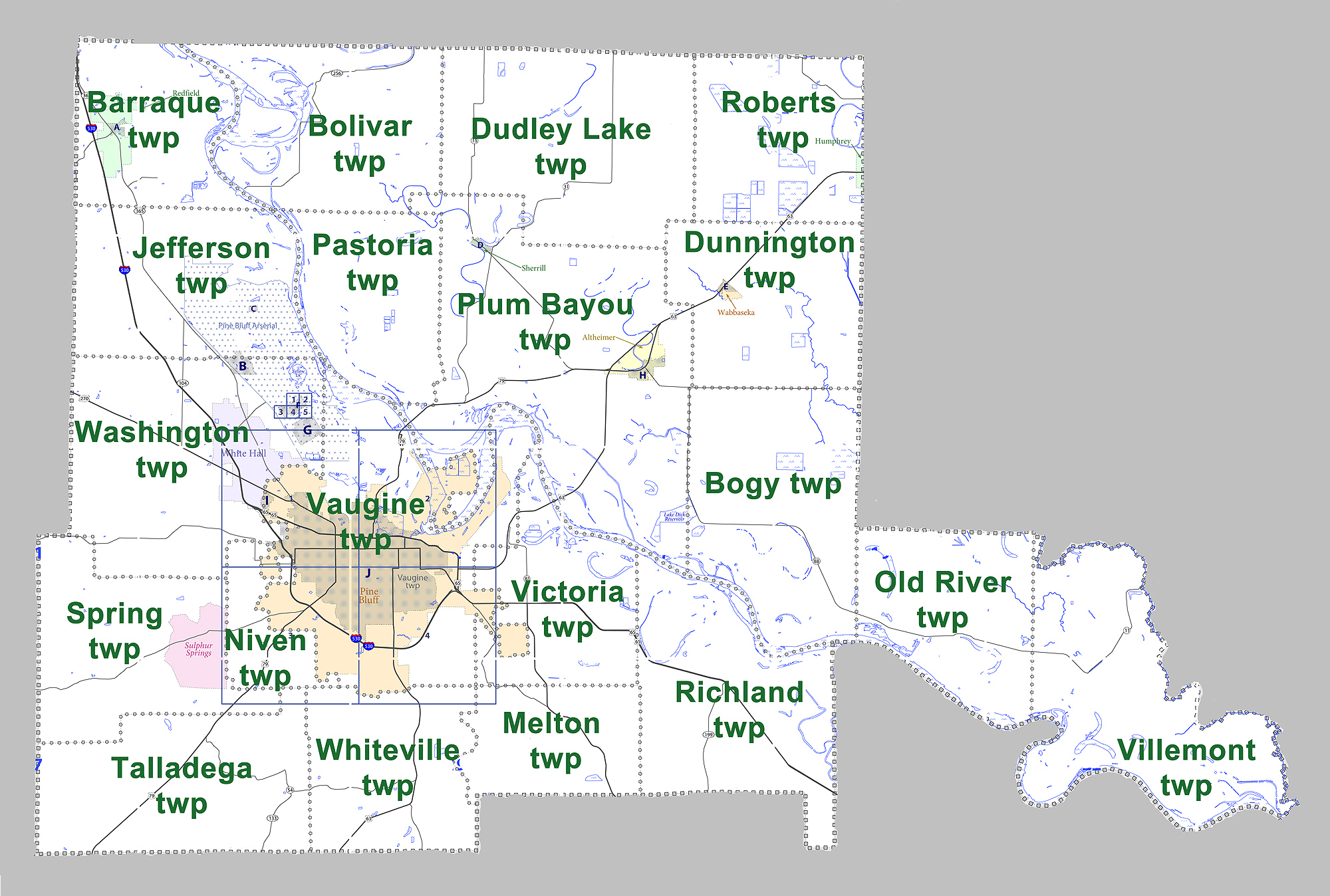
Townships in Jefferson County, Arkansas as of the 2010 U.S. census

In the Southern U.S., outside cities and towns there is generally no local government other than the county. However, certain states subdivide counties into minor divisions for certain historic, ceremonial, electoral, or land record purposes. Township is sometimes the term used for such minor divisions, along with related terms such a magisterial district, electoral district, precinct and others.

=== Arkansas and North Carolina ===
Arkansas townships are the divisions of a county. Each township includes unincorporated areas; some may have incorporated cities or towns within part of their boundaries. Arkansas townships have limited purposes in modern times. However, the U.S. census does list Arkansas population based on townships (sometimes referred to as "county subdivisions" or "minor civil divisions"). Townships are also of value for historical purposes in terms of genealogical research. Each town or city is within one or more townships in an Arkansas county based on census maps and publications.

North Carolina is no exception to that rule, but it does have townships as minor geographical subdivisions of counties, including both unincorporated territory and also land within the bounds of incorporated cities and towns (as well as the extraterritorial jurisdiction of municipalities). Every county is divided into townships as mandated since the North Carolina Constitution of 1868. Some urbanized counties such as Mecklenburg County (Charlotte) now number their townships (e.g. "Township 12") rather than using names. Townships all over the state used to have some official organization and duties but now are only considered ceremonial divisions of each county. Township names are still used quite extensively at the county government level in North Carolina as a way of determining and dividing up areas for administrative purposes; primarily for collecting county taxes, determining fire districts (e.g. Lebanon Township in Durham County gives its name to the Lebanon Volunteer Fire Department), for real estate purposes such as categorizing land deeds, land surveys and other real estate documents, and for voter registration purposes. In most areas of North Carolina that are outside any municipal limit (outside cities or towns), townships are used to determine voter polling places, and in most instances county election boards divide up their voter precincts by township. However, there is no government per se at the township level in North Carolina, and there are no elected or appointed offices associated with townships.

== States with civil towns or townships ==
States that have subdivided counties completely or partially into towns or townships. Currently uses towns Currently uses townships Formerly used townships Formerly varied

As of 2012, there were 16,360 organized town or township governments in the following 21 states:

- Connecticut
- Illinois
- Indiana
- Kansas
- Maine
- Massachusetts
- Michigan
- Minnesota
- Missouri
- Nebraska
- New Hampshire
- New Jersey
- New York
- North Dakota
- Ohio
- Pennsylvania
- Rhode Island
- South Dakota
- Utah
- Vermont
- Wisconsin

== States without civil townships ==
There were 29 states without organized town or township governments as of 2012:

- Alabama
- Alaska
- Arizona
- Arkansas
- California
- Colorado
- Delaware
- Florida
- Georgia
- Hawaii
- Idaho
- Iowa
- Kentucky
- Louisiana
- Maryland
- Mississippi
- Montana
- Nevada
- New Mexico
- North Carolina
- Oklahoma
- Oregon
- South Carolina
- Tennessee
- Texas
- Virginia
- Washington
- West Virginia
- Wyoming

== States which once had but no longer have civil townships ==
- California had townships at statehood. County boards of supervisors had the authority to create, consolidate, or abolish townships as late as the 1920s. A system of township assessors was established in some counties, but under the 1879 Constitution, townships were limited to judicial and law enforcement districts rather than administrative ones. As of 1967, every county was divided into townships for electoral purposes, but this was no longer the case by 1977. San Joaquin County's legal code continues to define that county's townships, although it does not delegate any powers or responsibilities to them.
- Iowa had 1,608 townships in 1942. By 1952, their responsibilities and functions had essentially been absorbed by their counties, were considered "vestigial", and were no longer counted. Townships exist in Iowa, but are counted as administrative divisions of their counties and are not counted as having separate governments by the United States Census Bureau.
- Oklahoma had civil townships statewide upon statehood. On August 5, 1913, Oklahoma voters passed the Oklahoma Township Amendment, also known as State Question 58. This allowed the creation or abolishment of townships on a county by county basis. By the mid-1930s, all counties had voted to abolish them. Their former names and boundaries were used for United States census counting purposes and census documentation through 1960, after which Census Counting Divisions (CCDs) were used.
- South Carolina had 2 townships in 1952, those of Folly Island and Sullivan's Island.
- Utah had a form of civil township called a metro township between 2015 and 2024. Each metro township had a mayor, council, and a budget, and could not be annexed without its permission. Its powers of taxation were limited, and it had to contract with other municipalities or municipal shared-service districts for most municipal services like police. In May 2024 the five metro townships, all located in Salt Lake County, were incorporated as cities or towns as a result of Utah's House Bill 35.
- The 1870 Constitution of Virginia required the division of counties into townships, but an amendment in 1874 converted those townships into magisterial districts.
- Washington had 70 townships in 1952, in only Spokane and Whatcom counties, for administration of local roads.

== Canada ==
The provinces of Eastern Canada have, or have had, divisions that are analogous to the townships of the United States.

Ontario and Quebec continue to have townships that subdivide their respective counties.

Local government was introduced into Nova Scotia (which at the time also included the maritime provinces of New Brunswick and Prince Edward Island) in 1749 in the form of townships controlled by a court of quarter sessions, a system that had characterized local government in Britain and Virginia. This court had both administrative and judicial functions, and took over most responsibilities of local government, including the appointment of necessary officers. A form of direct democracy was introduced into the townships by settlers from New England in 1760 with the help of a provincial statute. However, the statute was disallowed by the King in 1761, and direct democracy was replaced in the townships that had adopted it by the quarter sessions. Acts in 1855 and 1856 provided for the incorporation of self-governing townships, but only Yarmouth partook in incorporating, and abandoned the prospect after three years. These acts were repealed in 1879, and townships were replaced in the third quarter of the 19th century by self-governing municipalities.

== See also ==
- Township (United States)
- Survey township
- Charter township
- Metro township
- County (United States)
- Political divisions of the United States
- Minor civil division
- Hundred (county subdivision)
- Barony (county subdivision)
- Township for other divisions called "township"
- Unorganized territory
- List of subnational entities
