= Lebanon Township, Durham County, North Carolina =

Township in Durham County, North Carolina, U.S.

Coordinates: 36°05′32″N 78°55′33″W

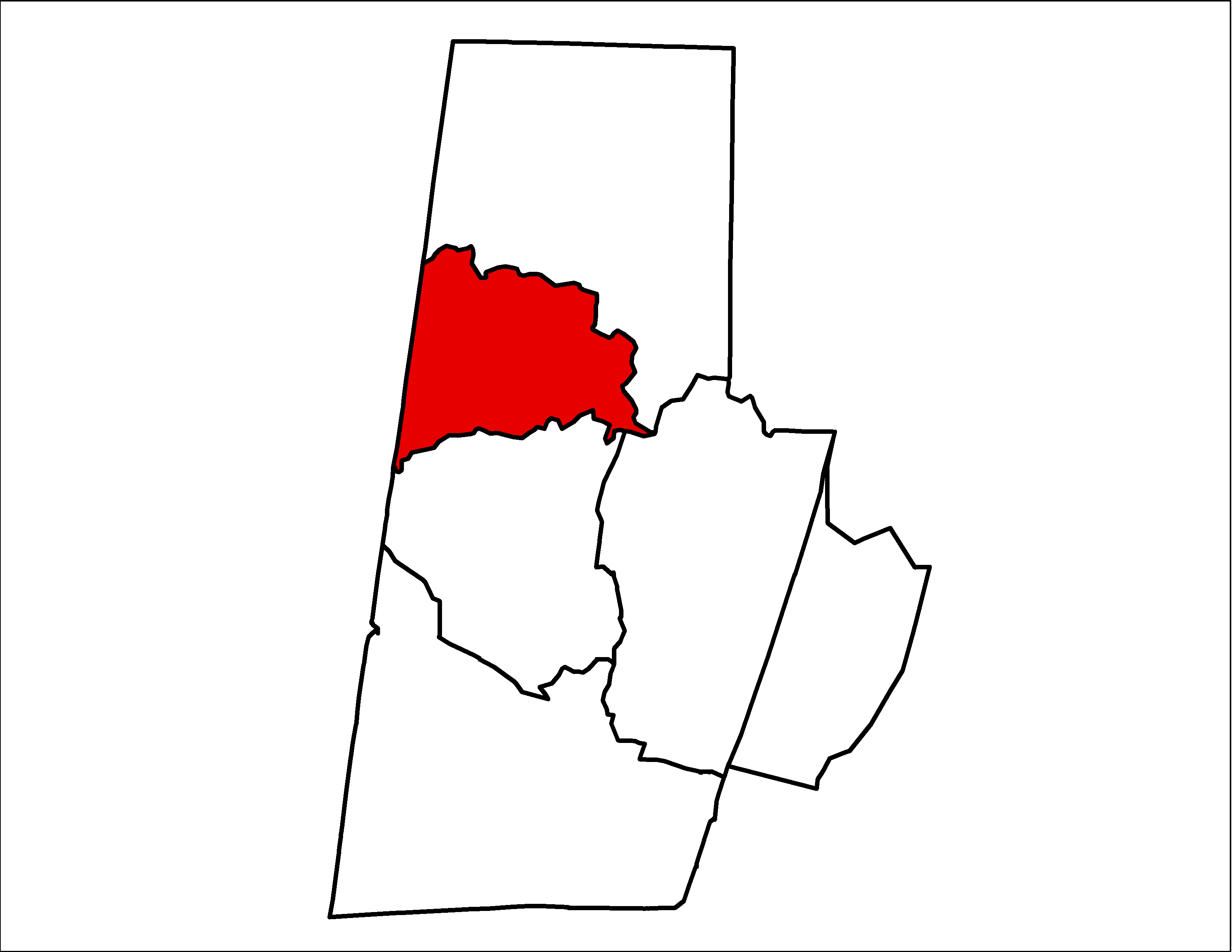
Location of Lebanon Township in Durham County, N.C.

Lebanon Township is one of six townships in Durham County, North Carolina, United States. The township had a population of 19,327 according to the 2023 American Community Survey.

Geographically, Lebanon Township occupies 29.7 square miles (77 km^{2}) in northwestern Durham County. The township is occupied by small portions of the city of Durham.

Popular roads in Lebanon include Russell and Guess. Three country clubs are located in Lebanon.
