= Park City School District =

School district in Utah, United States

- 2700 Kearns Blvd, Park City, UT 84060 Park City, Summit County, Utah

District information
- Motto: Inspiring and supporting all students equitably to achieve academic and social potential.
- Superintendent: Jill Gildea

Other information
- Website: pcschools.us

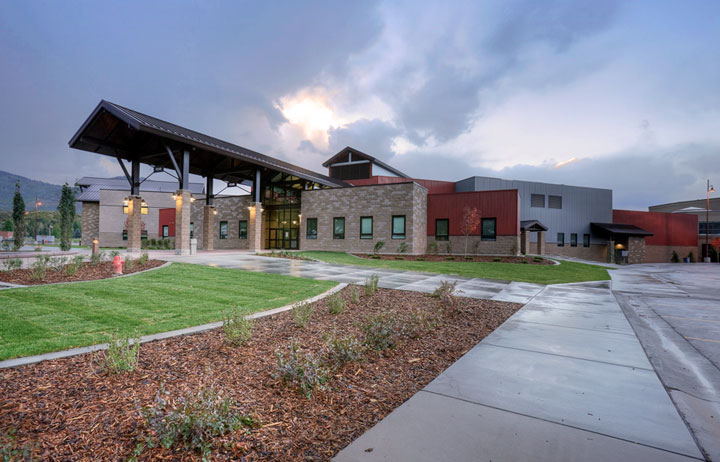
Park City High School

Park City School District (PCSD) is a school district headquartered in Park City, Utah that serves over 4,500 students.

The district's service area includes the portion of Park City in Summit County (almost all of Park City), the census designated places of Summit Park and Snyderville, the vast majority of the Silver Summit CDP, and a portion of the East Basin CDP.

== History ==
Jill Gildea became the superintendent in 2018.

In 2018 the school district bought a house that would be used as the residence of its superintendent.

In 2022 the board of trustees set 2024 as the new expiration date for the contract of Gildea.

In late 2022, Park City School District committed to plans that would demolish Treasure Mountain Junior High School, moving Eighth graders to Ecker Hill Middle and Ninth graders to Park City High. Park City School District has broken ground on such projects.

In 2023, Treasure Mountain Junior High School's campus had toxic soil piles as a result of the Park City School District using such dirt piles as a dumping ground for construction projects. The soil piles have since been removed.

== Schools ==
The Park City School District controls 4 elementary schools, 1 middle school, 1 junior high, and 1 high school.

=== Elementary Schools ===
- Jeremy Ranch Elementary
- McPolin Elementary
- Parley's Park Elementary
- Trailside Elementary

=== Middle and Junior High schools ===
==== Ecker Hill Middle School ====
Ecker Hill Middle School is the primary middle school in the Park City School District, serving sixth and seventh graders.

==== Treasure Mountain Junior High School ====
Treasure Mountain Junior High School served eighth and ninth graders. Being built in 1982, it was one of the oldest schools in the district and was demolished in 2025. According to U.S. News & World Report, in 2022 Treasure Mountain enrolled 780 students. Students scored 15% proficient in math and 41% in reading at the school.

===== Controversies =====
====== Soil Piles ======
In 2023, the PCSD was found to have broken an agreement with the United States Environmental Protection Agency where the school district moved soil laced with lead and arsenic behind Treasure Mountain.. The school district then removed the dust under governmental regulation during the following 2023-2024 school year.

====== Demolition ======
In November 2025, an anonymous tip led to Utah Water Regulators to investigate the PCSD for improperly dumping contaminated water into a nearby creek during the demolition of Treasure Mountain Junior High.. The district also received a compliance notice from the Utah Department of Environmental Quality related to their handing of asbestos near the demolition site.

=== High Schools ===
Park City High School is the only high school in the Park City School District, serving 10th, 11th, and 12th graders.
