= Oquirrh, Utah =

- CDP
- Interactive map of Oquirrh, Utah
- Coordinates: 40°37′48″N 112°0′56″W
- Country: United States
- State: Utah
- County: Salt Lake

Area
  - Total: 1.7 sq mi (4.5 km^{2})
  - Land: 1.7 sq mi (4.5 km^{2})
  - Water: 0 sq mi (0.0 km^{2})
- Elevation: 4,900 ft (1,500 m)

Population (2000)
  - Total: 10,390
  - Density: 5,950/sq mi (2,297.4/km^{2})
- Time zone: UTC-7 (Mountain (MST))
  - Summer (DST): UTC-6 (MDT)
- FIPS code: 49-56800
- GNIS feature ID: 1867581

Oquirrh is a census-designated place (CDP) in Salt Lake County, Utah. Oquirrh was once part of Kearns, UT. Through annexation in 2000, the city of West Jordan cut Oquirrh off from Kearns, making Oquirrh a CDP. As of the 2000 census, the CDP population was 10,390, a modest increase over the 1990 figure of 7,593.

== Geography ==
Oquirrh is located at 40°37′48″N 112°0′56″W (40.630046, -112.015675).

According to the United States Census Bureau, the CDP has a total area of 4.5 km^{2} (1.7 sq mi), all land.

== Demographics ==
Historical population
Census	Pop.	Note	%±
1990	7,593		—
2000	10,390		36.8%

As of the census of 2000, there were 10,390 people, 2,683 households, and 2,428 families residing in the CDP. The population density was 2,292.3 people /km^{2} (5,937 people/mi^{2}). There were 2,728 housing units at an average density of 601.9 units /km^{2} (1,559 units/mi^{2}). The racial makeup of the CDP was 87.60% White, 0.69% African American, 0.41% Native American, 1.36% Asian, 1.62% Pacific Islander, 6.18% from other races, and 2.14% from two or more races. Hispanic or Latino of any race were 12.58% of the population.

There were 2,683 households, out of which 69.3% had children under the age of 18 living with them, 75.0% were married couples living together, 11.2% had a female householder with no husband present, and 9.5% were non-families. 6.7% of all households were made up of individuals, and 0.7% had someone living alone who was 65 years of age or older. The average household size was 3.87 and the average family size was 4.03.

In the CDP, the population was spread out, with 43.0% under the age of 18, 10.1% from 18 to 24, 37.0% from 25 to 44, 8.6% from 45 to 64, and 1.3% who were 65 years of age or older. The median age was 23 years. For every 100 females, there were 99.9 males. For every 100 females age 18 and over, there were 95.2 males.

The median income for a household in the CDP was $51,199, and the median income for a family was $51,156. Males had a median income of $36,229 versus $24,270 for females. The per capita income for the CDP was $14,617. About 3.8% of families and 5.1% of the population were below the poverty line, including 5.1% of those under age 18 and 13.3% of those age 65 or over.

== See also ==
- List of census-designated places in Utah
