= Wolf Creek, Utah =

- Census-designated place
- Location within Utah
- Coordinates: 41°19′31″N 111°49′44″W
- Country: United States
- State: Utah
- County: Weber

Area
  - Total: 3.158 sq mi (8.18 km^{2})
  - Land: 3.158 sq mi (8.18 km^{2})
  - Water: 0 sq mi (0 km^{2})
- Elevation: 5,200 ft (1,600 m)

Population (2020)
  - Total: 1,645
  - Density: 520.9/sq mi (201.1/km^{2})
- Time zone: UTC-7 (Mountain (MST))
  - Summer (DST): UTC-6 (MDT)
- Area codes: 801 & 385
- GNIS feature ID: 2584783

Wolf Creek is a census-designated place in Weber County, Utah, United States. Its population was 1,645 as of the 2020 census.

== Geography ==
According to the U.S. Census Bureau, the community has an area of 3.158 square miles (8.18 km^{2}), all land.

== Demographics ==
=== 2020 census ===
As of the 2020 census, Wolf Creek had a population of 1,645. The median age was 48.0 years. 20.4% of residents were under the age of 18 and 19.1% of residents were 65 years of age or older. For every 100 females there were 100.6 males, and for every 100 females age 18 and over there were 101.2 males age 18 and over.

0.0% of residents lived in urban areas, while 100.0% lived in rural areas.

There were 612 households in Wolf Creek, of which 26.5% had children under the age of 18 living in them. Of all households, 70.1% were married-couple households, 13.4% were households with a male householder and no spouse or partner present, and 11.9% were households with a female householder and no spouse or partner present. About 19.4% of all households were made up of individuals and 9.8% had someone living alone who was 65 years of age or older.

There were 1,290 housing units, of which 52.6% were vacant. The homeowner vacancy rate was 1.1% and the rental vacancy rate was 11.5%.

Racial composition as of the 2020 census
Race	Number	Percent
White	1,508	91.7%
Black or African American	13	0.8%
American Indian and Alaska Native	10	0.6%
Asian	11	0.7%
Native Hawaiian and Other Pacific Islander	1	0.1%
Some other race	23	1.4%
Two or more races	79	4.8%
Hispanic or Latino (of any race)	58	3.5%

=== 2010 census ===
As of the 2010 census, the population was 1,336.

== See also ==
- List of census-designated places in Utah
