= Utah State Route 139 =

State highway in Utah, United States

State Route 139
- SR-139 highlighted in red

Route information
- Maintained by UDOT
- Length: 1.408 mi (2.266 km)
- Existed: 1933–present

Major junctions
- South end: US 6 in Spring Glen
- North end: SR-157 in Spring Glen

Location
- Country: United States
- State: Utah

Highway system
- Utah State Highway System; Interstate; US; State; Minor; Scenic
← SR-138	→ SR-140

Utah State Route 139 (SR-139) is a 1.408-mile-long (2.266 km) state highway in the state of Utah that connects U.S. Route 6 (US-6) to SR-157 in Carbon County.

== Route description ==
The route begins at US-6 south of Helper in Spring Glen as Spring Glen Road. Classified as a rural major collector, it crosses Spring Glen Creek as it heads north toward its northern terminus at SR-157, spanning a distance of 1.4 miles (2.3 km).

== History ==
State Route 139 was originally established in 1933 as the road from former Route 8 (now US-6) west to Consumers, a distance of about 13.3 miles (21.4 km). In 1969, SR-139 was extended east past US-6 and north through Spring Glen to meet State Route 157, eight years after SR-157 had been extended north from Spring Glen to Helper. The route was significantly shortened in 1975, with the 13.3 miles (21.4 km) west of US-6 being deleted from the state highway system, leaving SR-139 as a short connector between US-6 and SR-157. In 1978, SR-139 was lengthened by 0.1 miles (0.16 km) when reconstruction of US-6 in the area necessitated moving its intersection with SR-139 southward, resulting in the current alignment.

== Major intersections ==
The entire route is in Spring Glen, Carbon County.

mi	km	Destinations	Notes
0.000	0.000	US 6	Southern terminus
1.408	2.266	SR-157	Northern terminus
1.000 mi = 1.609 km; 1.000 km = 0.621 mi
