= White River (Price River tributary) =

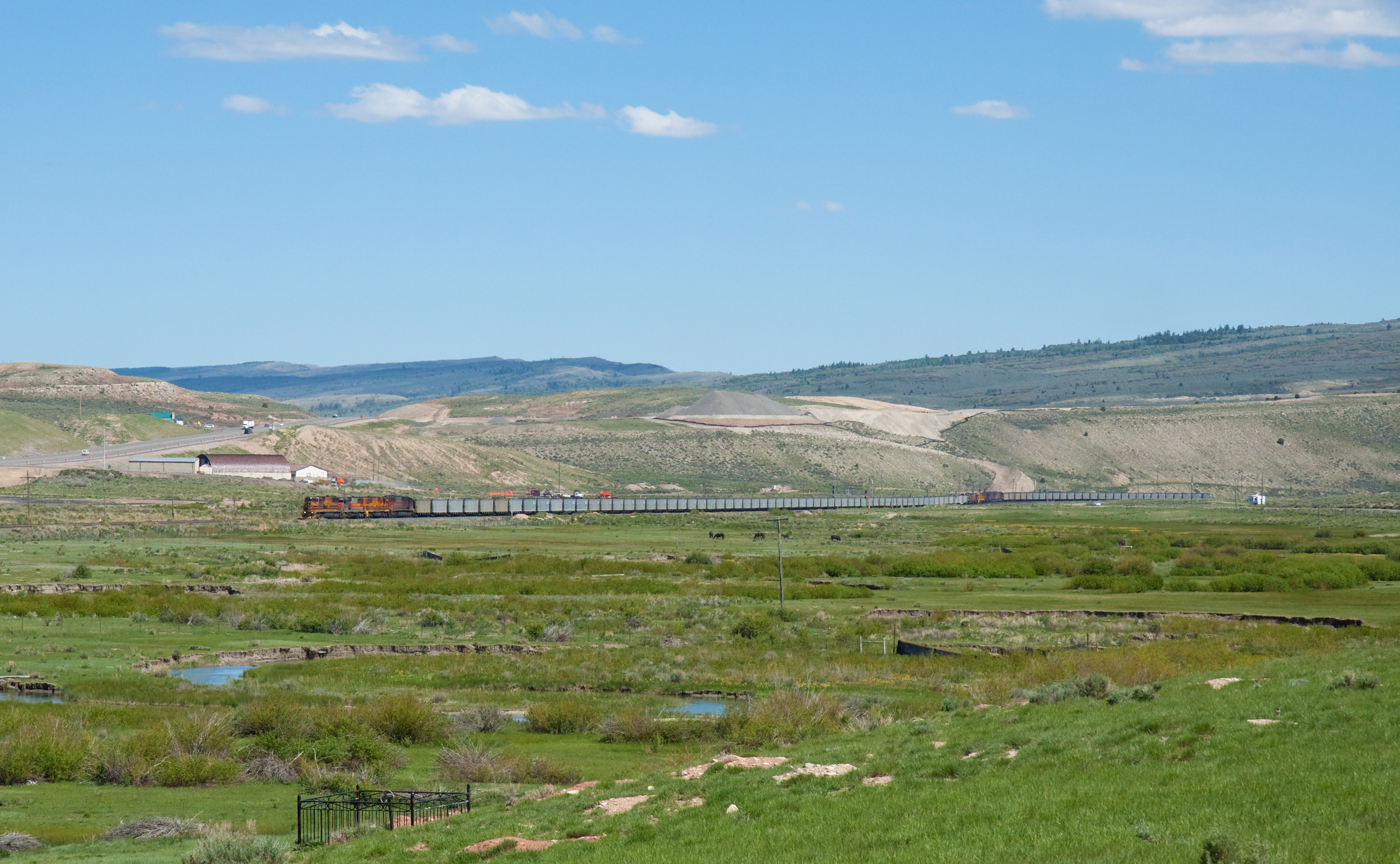

- Location of mouth of the White River

Location
- Country: United States
- State: Utah
- Region: Wasatch County, Utah and Utah County, Utah Counties
- Cities: Soldier Summit, Colton

Physical characteristics
- Source
  - location: Confluence of Left Fork White River and Right Fork White River, east of Soldier Summit, Utah
  - coordinates: 39°55′25″N 111°03′25″W
  - elevation: 7,362 ft (2,244 m)
- Mouth: Confluence with the Price River
  - location: Colton, Utah
  - coordinates: 39°50′19″N 111°00′24″W
  - elevation: 7,162 ft (2,183 m)

Basin features
- Tributaries
  - left: Tabbyune Creek
  - right: Left Fork White River

The White River is a 8-mile-long (13 km) southeastward flowing river in Wasatch and Utah Counties in eastern Utah. The White River is a tributary to the Price River, which is, in turn, a tributary to the Green River, and then to the Colorado River.

== History ==
In pioneer times, northbound travelers from the Castle or Price River Valleys ascended along the White River to the Emma and Whitmore Park area east of Soldier Summit and then descended northeast through the Soldier Creek canyon to reach the cities of the Utah and Salt Lake Valleys.

== Watershed and Course ==
About 6 miles (9.7 km) northeast of Soldier Summit, the White River mainstem is formed by the confluence of the Left Fork White River, which begins on the south flank of Willow Creek Ridge, and the Right Fork White River which drains Reservation Ridge. Most of the upper watershed is in Wasatch County in the Uinta National Forest, now part of the Wasatch-Cache National Forest. The Left Fork also has a Middle Fork White River tributary. As the White River heads southeast along U.S. Route 6, it is joined by Tabbyune Creek, before ending at the confluence with the Price River in Colton in Utah County.

== Ecology ==
The White River, and other headwater streams of the Price River, harbor Colorado River cutthroat trout ((Oncorhynchus clarki pleuriticus). The distribution and abundance of this cutthroat trout subspecies are now limited to small populations in less than 1% of its historic range in the upper tributaries of the Colorado River watershed. The chief vulnerability of Colorado River cutthroat trout is hybridization with non-native rainbow trout and competitive replacement by non-native brown trout (Salmo trutta) and brook trout (Salvelinus fontinalis). Other fish found in the White River watershed include mottled sculpin (Cottus bairdii), speckled dace (Rhinichthys osculus), and mountain sucker (Catostomus platyrhynchus).

== See also ==
- List of Utah rivers
