= Price River =

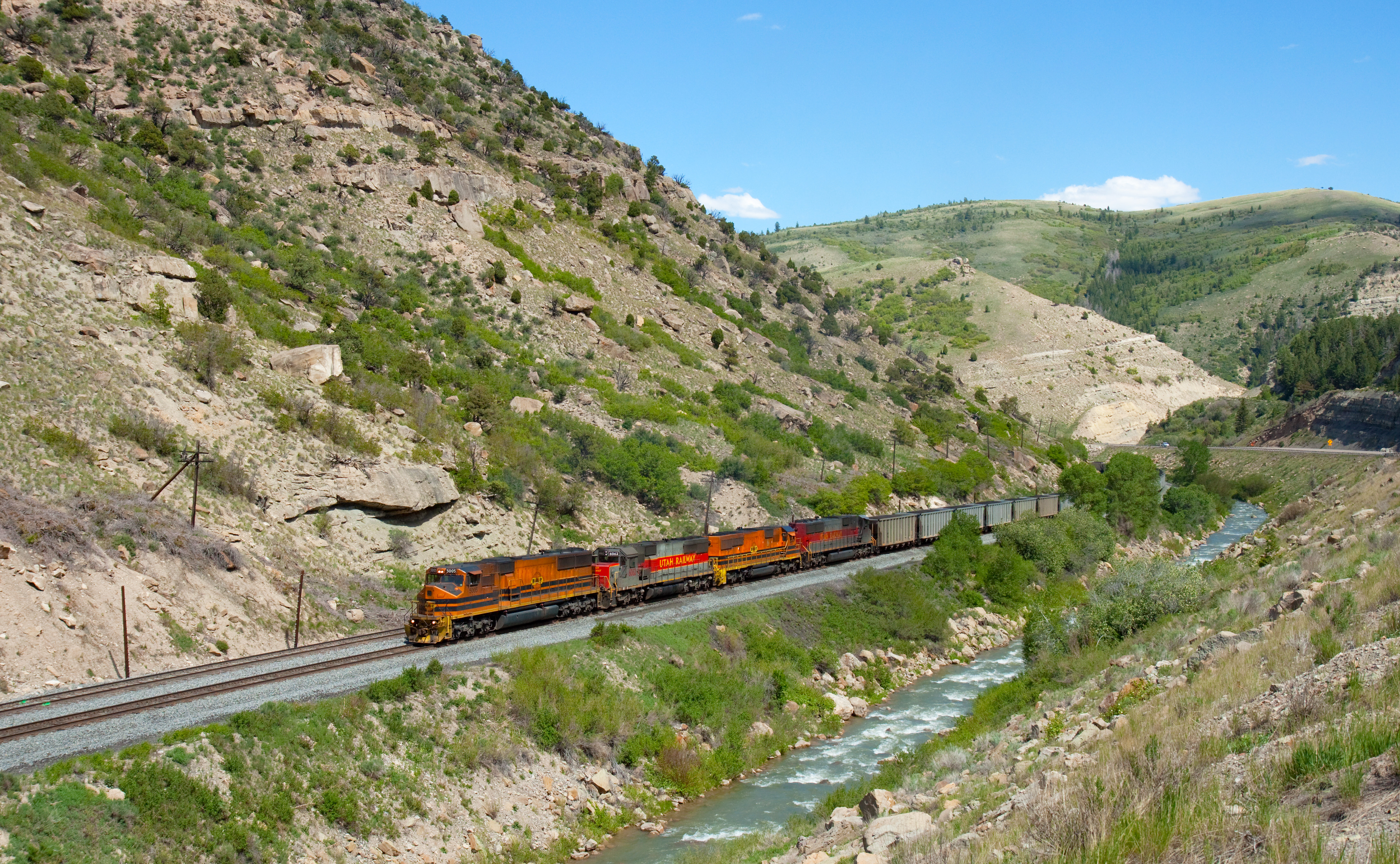
- The Price River in Price Canyon, June 2010

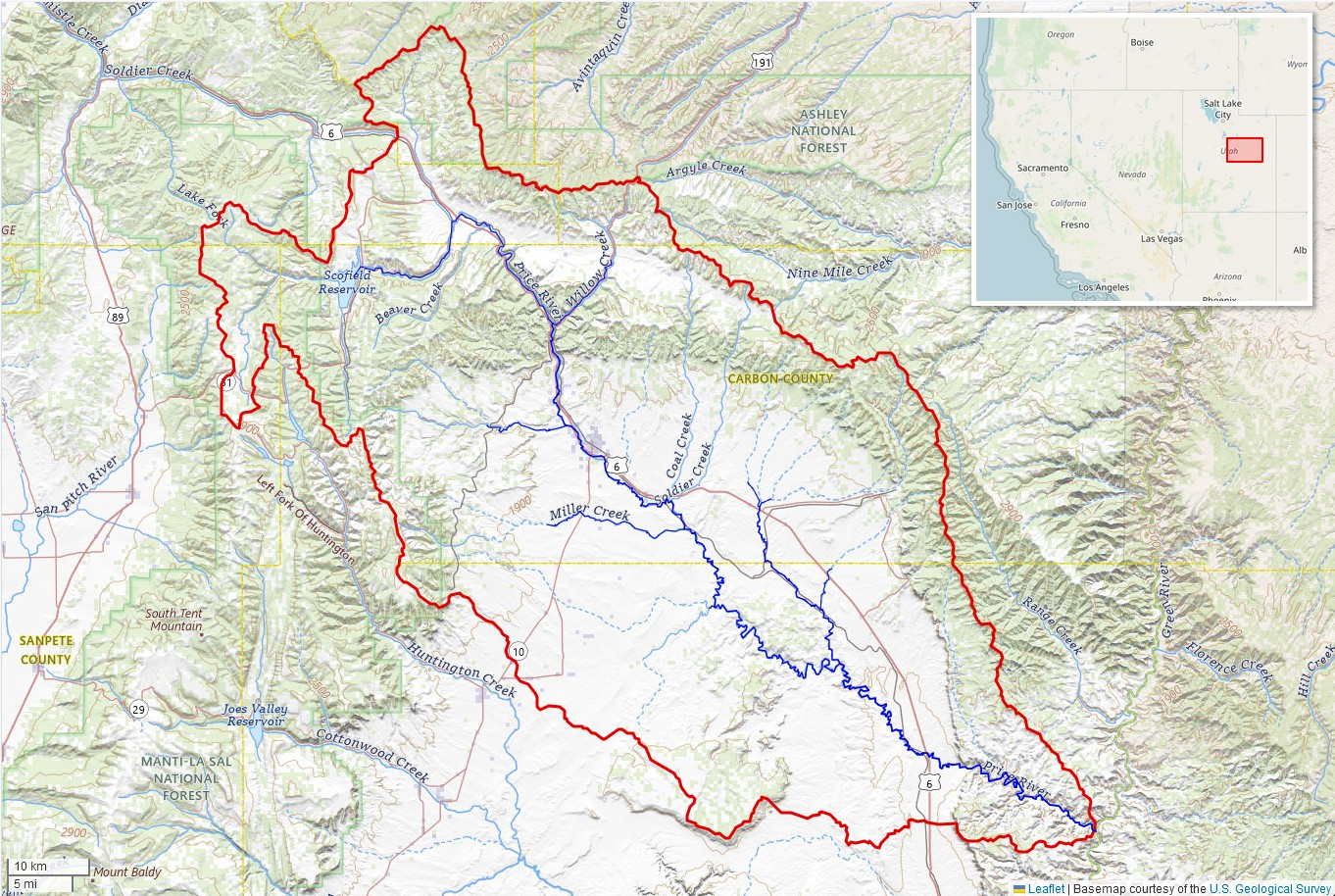
- Price River watershed (Interactive map)

Location
- Country: United States
- State: Utah
- Region: Carbon, Utah, and Emery Counties
- Cities: Colton, Royal, Castle Gate, Helper, Spring Glen, Carbonville, Price, Wellington, Woodside

Physical characteristics
- Source: Scofield Reservoir
  - location: Northern edge of the Manti–La Sal National Forest and Wasatch Plateau
  - coordinates: 39°47′13″N 111°07′24″W
  - elevation: 7,618 ft (2,322 m)
- Mouth: Confluence with the Green River
  - location: 20 miles (32 km) north of Green River, Utah
  - coordinates: 39°10′46″N 110°06′23″W
  - elevation: 4,140 ft (1,260 m)
- Basin size: 1,900 sq mi (4,900 km^{2})

Basin features
- Tributaries
  - left: White River, Willow Creek, Coal Creek, Grassy Trail Creek
  - right: Miller Creek, Gordon Creek, Beaver Creek

The Price River is a 137-mile-long (220 km) southeastward flowing river in Carbon, Utah and Emery counties in eastern Utah. It is a tributary to the Green River, itself a tributary to the Colorado River.

== History ==
The river's early name was the White River, but it was changed in the summer of 1869 when LDS Bishop William Price of Goshen, Utah, explored the region and renamed it, making the White River above Colton into a tributary of the Price River. The town of Price was later named after the river.

== Watershed and course ==
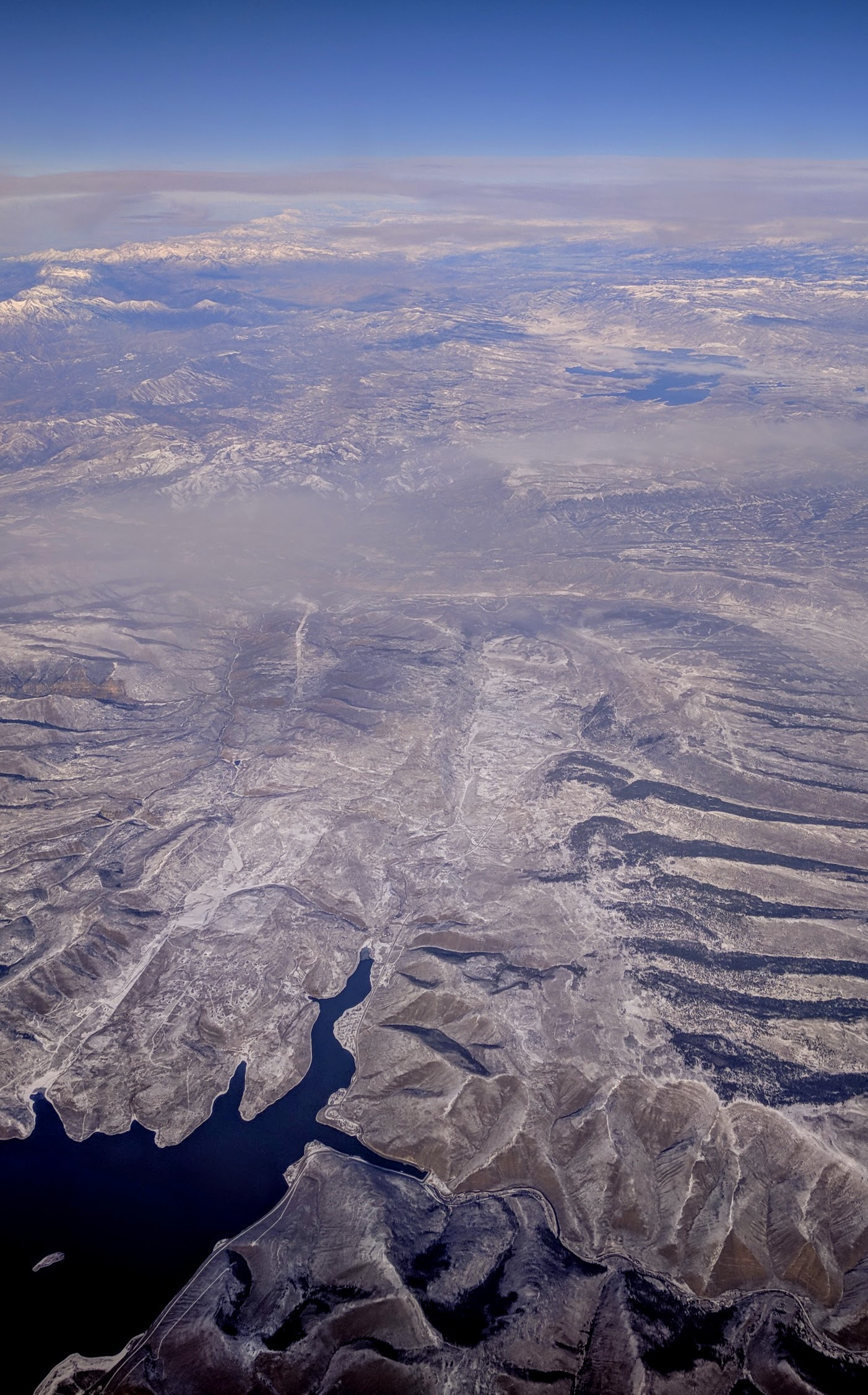
The Scofield Reservoir flows into the Price River (lower right)

The Price River watershed comprises 1,900 square miles (4,900 km^{2}). The USGS indicates that the Price River originates at Scofield Reservoir in the Wasatch Plateau in Carbon County in central Utah. From the reservoir, the river flows briefly eastward and northeastward into Utah County, where it receives the flows of the White River at Colton. Colton was originally named Pleasant Valley Junction, and Scofield Reservoir would occupy a large portion of Pleasant Valley. Alternatively, historical accounts place the origin of the Price River at the confluence of the White River and Fish Creek, such that lower Fish Creek continued from below Scofield Dam to said confluence. The White River drains the Tavaputs Plateau.

From Colton the Price River continues southeastward, receiving Beaver Creek from the right and then Kyune Creek from the left (at Kyune). Below Kyune, the river enters Price Canyon and drops back into Carbon County alongside U.S. Route 6. The canyon of the Price River is a physiographic break between the Wasatch Plateau and the Book Cliffs. Next, from the left the Price River receives Willow Creek at Castle Gate. Willow Creek is the largest tributary in the Book Cliffs area with a watershed of 81 square miles (210 km^{2}). After leaving Price Canyon at Heiner, the Price River enters the city of Helper, and then Price. From Price, the river continues southeast along the northeastern edge of the San Rafael Swell to the ghost town of Woodside, at which point it proceeds east into canyonlands, joining the Green River in Gray Canyon, about 20 miles (32 km) north of Green River, Utah.

The Scofield Reservoir was formed by the construction of the Scofield Dam in 1946. Scofield Reservoir is fed by Pondtown Creek, Mud Creek, and Fish Creek, the primary tributary to the reservoir. There are plans to build a second dam on the river, upstream from the Scofield Reservoir, called the Gooseberry Narrows Dam near the confluence of Gooseberry Creek with Fish Creek. The proposal has met with opposition out of concern for environmental impacts on trout fisheries in the Price River headwaters and the planned diversion of the water impounded by the dam out of the Colorado River basin to supplement the irrigation systems of the Sanpete Valley. As a result of the planned dam the Price River was included on the American Rivers list of the top ten endangered rivers in the United States in 2005.

Just downstream of the town of Price, a partnership of the Carbon Canal Company (CCC), The Nature Conservancy (TNC), and the Utah Division of Wildlife Resources (UDWR), is expanding the Olsen Reservoir so that it can capture high spring Price River flows at the end of the Carbon Canal and store it, for agricultural use and to recharge the river in dry seasons and drought years.

Tributaries downstream of Price are largely ephemeral. The largest is Grassy Trail Creek which exits the Book Cliffs at East Carbon, Carbon County, and joins the Price River south of Cedar, Emery County.

== Ecology ==
The headwaters of the Price River harbor Colorado River cutthroat trout ((Oncorhynchus clarki pleuriticus). Distribution and abundance of this cutthroat trout subspecies are now limited to small populations in less than 1% of its historic range in the upper tributaries of the Colorado River watershed. The chief vulnerability of Colorado River cutthroat trout is hybridization with non-native rainbow trout and competitive replacement by non-native brown trout (Salmo trutta) and brook trout (Salvelinus fontinalis).

The federally endangered Colorado pikeminnow (Ptychocheilus lucius) is extant in the lower 143 kilometres (89 mi) of the Price River. Three other imperiled fishes of the upper Colorado River basin, whose habitat is high desert streams, are the roundtail chub (Gila robusta), the flannelmouth sucker (Catostomus latipinnis), and the bluehead sucker (Catostomus discobolus). All three inhabit or inhabited the lower Price River until the roundtail chub was likely extirpated from the Price River due to low flows in 1977 and 1993, a localized rotenone detoxification problem in 1977, and/or multiple other pollution-caused fish kills.

== Recreation ==
The Price is a small, shallow river and is normally unnavigable. However, during high springtime flows, the 23.5 miles (37.8 km) below the Scofield Dam to Castle Gate contain Class I to V whitewater. The river has become increasingly popular with canoeists and kayakers.

The tailwater below Scofield Reservoir is sometimes called Lower Fish Creek (although the USGS sets the source of the Price River at the reservoir dam). It is considered Blue Ribbon flyfishing for large brown trout. This uppermost reach is paralleled by railroad tracks in a very scenic canyon and is stocked annually with non-native brown trout fingerlings, which have been known to mature up to 10 pounds (4.5 kg).

== See also ==
- List of Utah rivers
- List of tributaries of the Colorado River
