= Metro township =

Type of municipal government in Utah

A metro township was a type of municipal government in Utah equivalent to a civil township. These were first allowed in Utah starting in 2015 (per Senate Bill 199 – the Community Preservation Act) both to allow existing unincorporated communities to avoid piecemeal annexation, and to give those residents some say in local government, without creating additional government overhead. While each metro township had a mayor and township council, managed a budget, and could not be annexed without its permission, its powers of taxation were limited, and it had to contract with other municipalities and/or municipal shared-service districts for most municipal services (police, for example). The five metro townships – all located in Salt Lake County – were Kearns, Magna, Copperton, Emigration Canyon and White City. In March 2024, Governor Spencer Cox signed a bill that eliminated the metro township designation, converting the five existing metro townships into cities with taxing authority.
