= Spring Glen, Utah =

- Census-designated place
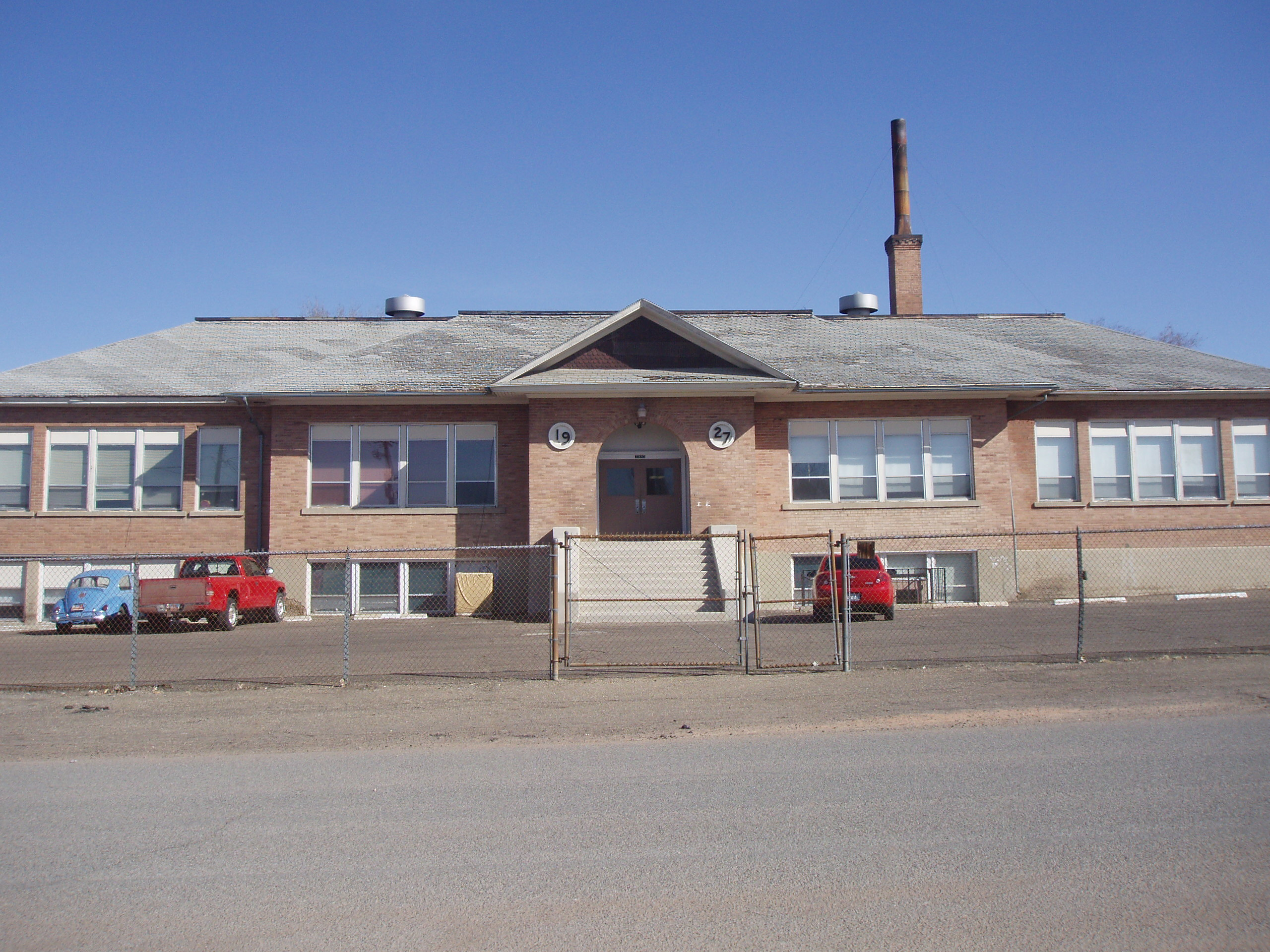
- Spring Glen's 1927 schoolhouse

- Location in Carbon County and the state of Utah
- Coordinates: 39°39′22″N 110°50′46″W
- Country: United States
- State: Utah
- County: Carbon
- Settled: 1878
- Founder: James Gay

Area
  - Total: 3.4 sq mi (8.8 km^{2})
  - Land: 3.4 sq mi (8.8 km^{2})
  - Water: 0 sq mi (0.0 km^{2})
- Elevation: 5,771 ft (1,759 m)

Population (2020)
  - Total: 1,054
  - Density: 330/sq mi (127.4/km^{2})
- Time zone: UTC-7 (Mountain (MST))
  - Summer (DST): UTC-6 (MDT)
- ZIP code: 84526
- Area code: 435
- GNIS feature ID: 2584777

Spring Glen is a census-designated place in Carbon County, in eastern Utah, United States. The population was 1,054 at the 2020 census. Founded in 1878, Spring Glen was the first permanent settlement in what is now Carbon County. First settled principally by white Mormon farmers, the community became much more diverse after about 1890, when the development of the area's coal mines brought an influx of immigrants from Southern Europe and other regions.

== History ==
The first settlers in Spring Glen were a handful of bachelor farmers, starting with James Gay in 1878. Groups of friends and relatives joined the first few homesteaders, mostly independent minded people who were separate from the organized Mormon project to establish what became Emery County.

As children began to arrive, a school was started in 1883, but such a public development was the exception rather than the rule. The early settlers were nonconformists, less religious and less social than their counterparts in other Utah settlements, so the community was slow to develop. It was difficult to get the residents to cooperate in any communal projects. The LDS Church organized the first ward here in 1883, but it was not until the winter of 1886–7 that a company was formed to build an irrigation canal, which was not completed until 1893. The canal company agreed on the name of Spring Glen for the village as well as the company. The Spring Glen townsite was officially surveyed on May 27–28, 1890.

From 1910–1925 the settlement was called Ewell, in honor of Francis M. Ewell, an 1882 settler who died in 1905.

The community of Helper was part of Spring Glen until 1891.

== Geography ==
Spring Glen lies along the Price River, just to the south of Helper and southwest of Kenilworth. To the southeast are Carbonville and the county seat, Price. U.S. Route 6 runs past Spring Glen between Price and Helper, and SR-139 branches east from it to become Spring Glen Road, the major street through town. According to the United States Census Bureau, the CDP has a total area of 3.4 square miles (8.8 km^{2}), all land.

=== Climate ===
According to the Köppen Climate Classification system, Spring Glen has a humid continental climate, abbreviated "Dfb" on climate maps. This climatic region is typified by large seasonal temperature differences, with warm to hot (and often humid) summers and cold (sometimes severely cold) winters.

== Demographics ==
Historical population
Census	Pop.	Note	%±
1890	137		—
1900	214		56.2%
1910	181		−15.4%
1920	298		64.6%
1930	659		121.1%
1940	888		34.7%
1950	929		4.6%
2010	1,126		—
2020	1,054		−6.4%
Source: U.S. Census Bureau

As of the census of 2010, there were 1,126 people living in the CDP. There were 478 housing units, of which 421 were occupied. The racial makeup of the population was 95.6% White, 0.2% Black or African American, 0.4% American Indian and Alaska Native, 1.0% Asian, 0.2% Native Hawaiian and Other Pacific Islander, 1.3% from some other race, and 1.3% from two or more races. Hispanic or Latino of any race were 7.2% of the population.

== See also ==
- List of census-designated places in Utah
