= Kenilworth, Utah =

- Census-designated place
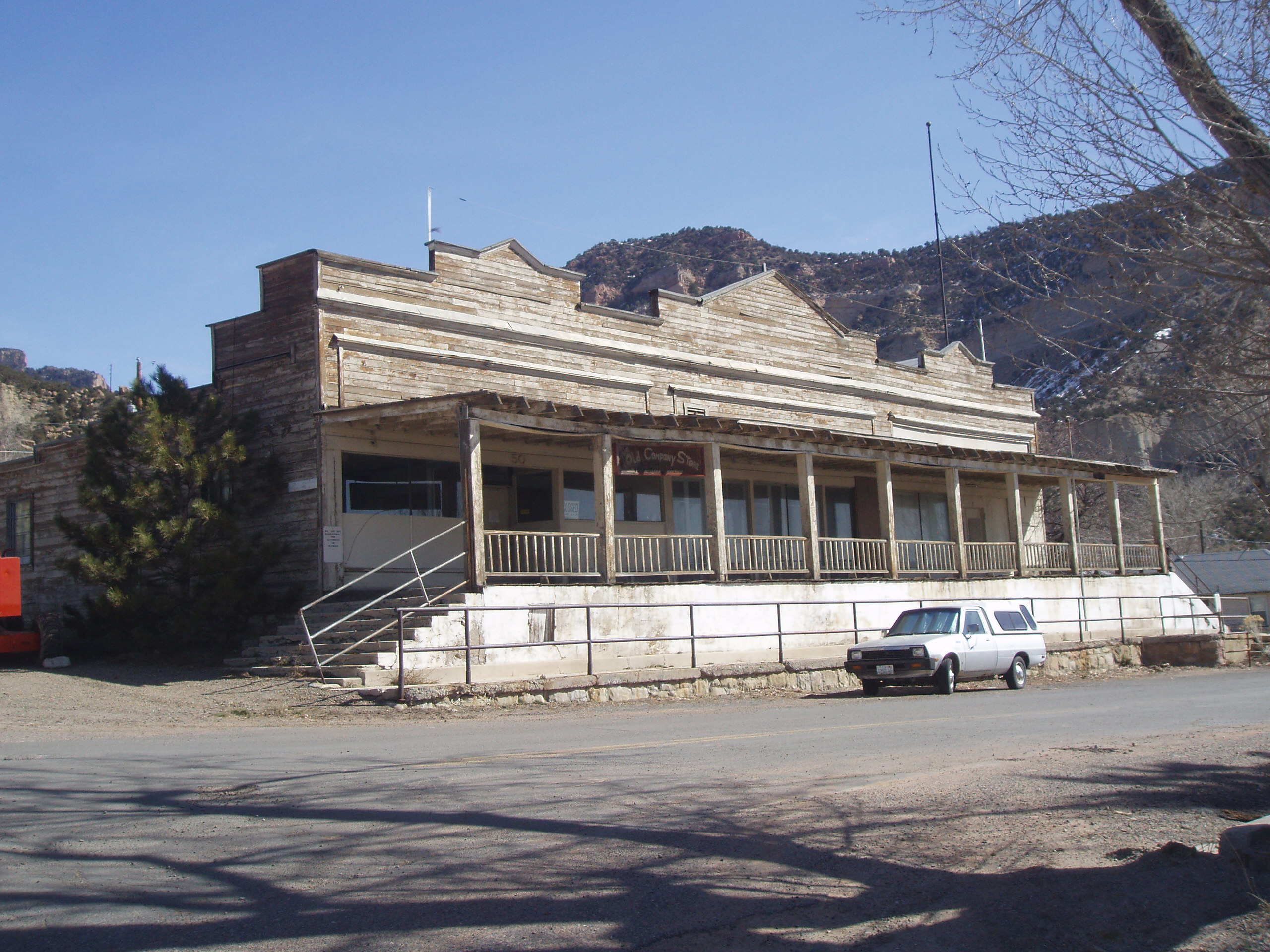
- Kenilworth's Old Company Store, March 2008

- Location in Carbon County and the state of Utah
- Coordinates: 39°40′49″N 110°48′52″W
- Country: United States
- State: Utah
- County: Carbon
- Founded: 1908
- Named after: Kenilworth Castle

Area
  - Total: 0.75 sq mi (1.95 km^{2})
  - Land: 0.75 sq mi (1.95 km^{2})
  - Water: 0 sq mi (0.0 km^{2})
- Elevation: 6,319 ft (1,926 m)

Population (2020)
  - Total: 200
  - Density: 239/sq mi (92.4/km^{2})
- GNIS feature ID: 2584769

Kenilworth is a census-designated place in northern Carbon County, Utah, United States. As of the 2020 census, Kenilworth had a population of 200.

== Description ==
The community lies at the eastern end of State Route 157, north of the city of Price, the county seat of Carbon County. Kenilworth has a post office with the ZIP code 84529. The population was 180 at the 2010 census.

== History ==
Like many communities in Carbon County, Kenilworth began as a coal mining camp. Coal was first discovered in the area in 1904, and the town site was laid out in 1908. The name Kenilworth was given by British miners who thought the mountain peaks overlooking the area resembled the spires of Kenilworth Castle.

== Demographics ==
Historical population
Census	Pop.	Note	%±
2010	180		—
2020	200		11.1%

The population was about 500 in 1910, rose to a high of 1,050 in 1947, and at the 1990 census was down to 350.

As of the census of 2010, there were 180 people living in the CDP. There were 112 housing units. The racial makeup of the town was 92.8% White, 5.0% from some other race, and 2.2% from two or more races. Hispanic or Latino of any race were 20.0% of the population.

== Climate ==
This climatic region is typified by large seasonal temperature differences, with warm to hot (and often humid) summers and cold (sometimes severely cold) winters. According to the Köppen Climate Classification system, Kenilworth has a humid continental climate, abbreviated "Dfb" on climate maps.

== Gallery ==
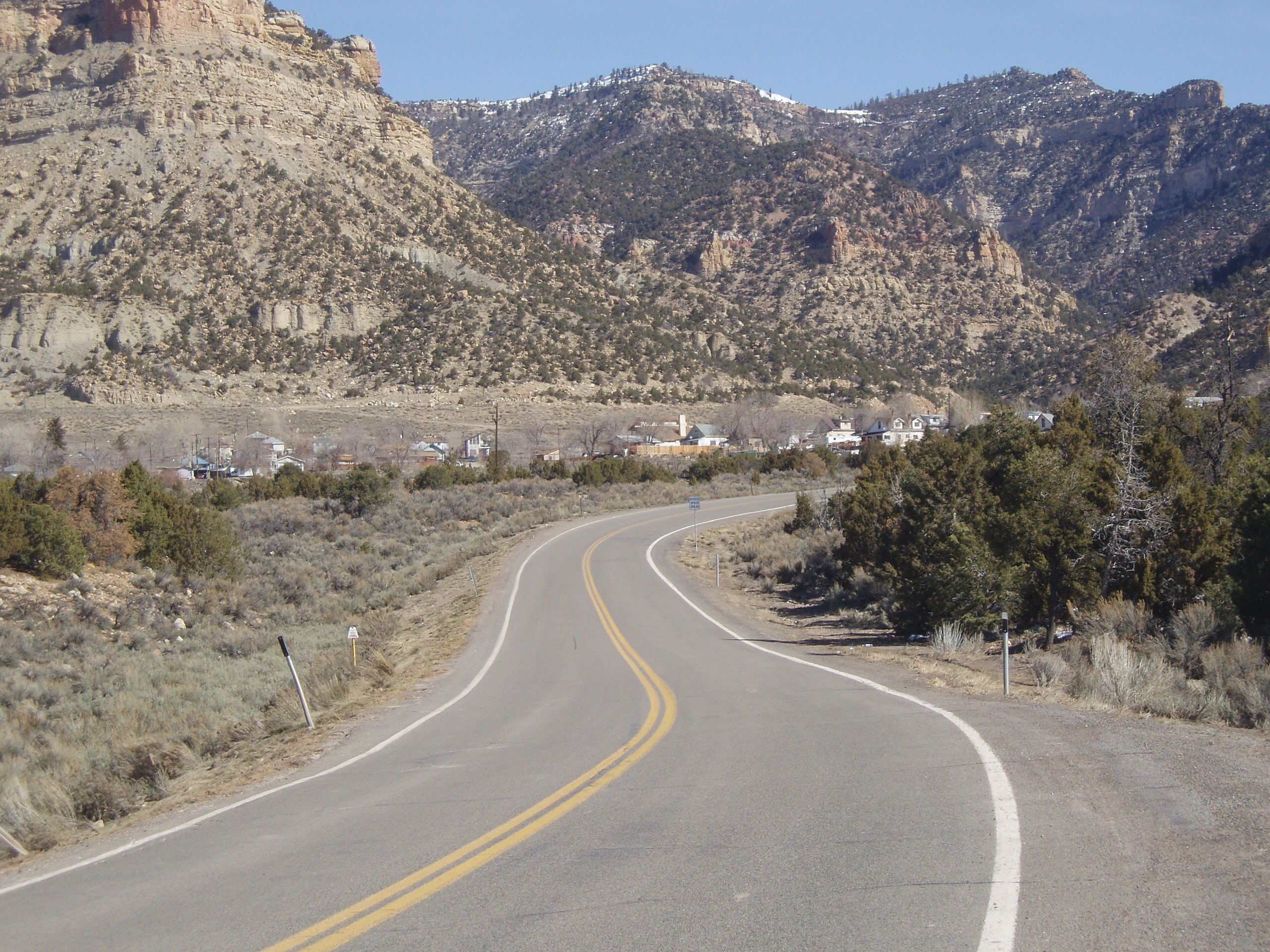
Approaching Kenilworth

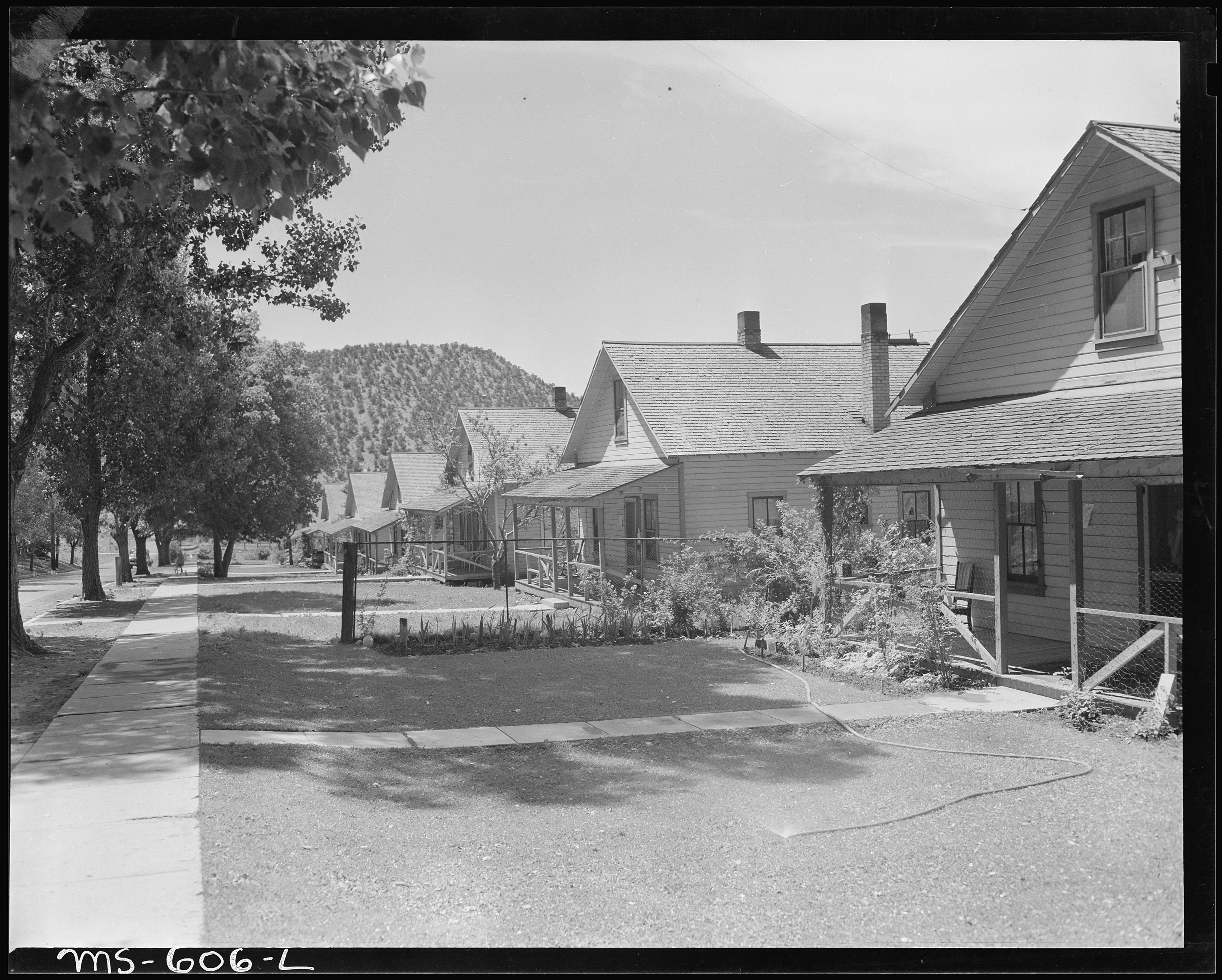
Part of company housing project, Independent Coal & Coke Company, Kenilworth Mine, Kenilworth, 1946

== See also ==
- List of census-designated places in Utah
