= Snyderville, Utah =

Snyderville
- CDP
- Location in Summit County and the state of Utah
- Coordinates: 40°42′15″N 111°32′36″W
- Country: United States
- State: Utah
- County: Summit
- Settled: 1865
- Named for: G. G. Snyder

Area
  - Total: 10.9 sq mi (28.3 km^{2})
  - Land: 10.9 sq mi (28.3 km^{2})
  - Water: 0 sq mi (0.0 km^{2})
- Elevation: 6,483 ft (1,976 m)

Population (2020)
  - Total: 6,744
  - Density: 617/sq mi (238/km^{2})
- Time zone: UTC-7 (Mountain (MST))
  - Summer (DST): UTC-6 (MDT)
- ZIP code: 84098
- FIPS code: 49-71125
- GNIS feature ID: 2584776

Snyderville is a census-designated place (CDP) near the southwestern edge of Summit County, Utah, United States. Prior to the 2010 Census, the area was designated as South Snyderville Basin CDP. The population was 6,744 at the 2020 census.

== Geography ==
According to the United States Census Bureau, the CDP has a total area of 10.9 square miles (28 km^{2}), all land. The community lies approximately 4 miles (6.4 km) northwest of Park City, in the western part of the Snyderville Basin.

== Demographics ==
As of the census of 2000, there were 3,636 people, 1,226 households, and 977 families residing in the CDP. The population density was 332.4 people per square mile (128.3/km^{2}). There were 1,364 housing units at an average density of 124.7/sq mi (48.1/km^{2}). The racial makeup of the CDP was 95.65% White, 0.14% African American, 0.36% Native American, 0.99% Asian, 0.08% Pacific Islander, 1.10% from other races, and 1.68% from two or more races. Hispanic or Latino of any race were 3.44% of the population.

There were 1,226 households, out of which 49.3% had children under the age of 18 living with them, 71.8% were married couples living together, 6.0% had a female householder with no husband present, and 20.3% were non-families. 13.3% of all households were made up of individuals, and 1.6% had someone living alone who was 65 years of age or older. The average household size was 2.97 and the average family size was 3.27.

In the CDP, the population was spread out, with 32.2% under the age of 18, 4.6% from 18 to 24, 34.5% from 25 to 44, 25.8% from 45 to 64, and 2.9% who were 65 years of age or older. The median age was 37 years. For every 100 females, there were 103.5 males. For every 100 females age 18 and over, there were 104.7 males.

The median income for a household in the CDP was $86,116, and the median income for a family was $92,644. Males had a median income of $62,650 versus $40,524 for females. The per capita income for the CDP was $35,405. About 2.8% of families and 4.2% of the population were below the poverty line, including 2.9% of those under age 18 and none of those age 65 or over.

== Education ==
It is within the Park City School District. Park City High School is the district's comprehensive high school.

== See also ==
- List of census-designated places in Utah
