= Silver Summit, Utah =

- CDP
- Location in Summit County and the state of Utah
- Coordinates: 40°45′12″N 111°30′35″W
- Country: United States
- State: Utah
- County: Summit

Area
  - Total: 16.4 sq mi (42.6 km^{2})
  - Land: 16.4 sq mi (42.6 km^{2})
  - Water: 0 sq mi (0.0 km^{2})
- Elevation: 6,513 ft (1,985 m)

Population (2020)
  - Total: 1,694
  - Density: 103/sq mi (39.8/km^{2})
- Time zone: UTC-7 (Mountain (MST))
  - Summer (DST): UTC-6 (MDT)
- ZIP code: 84098
- Area code: 435
- FIPS code: 49-55237
- GNIS feature ID: 2584775

Silver Summit is a census-designated place (CDP) in Summit County, Utah, United States. Prior to the 2010 Census, the area was designated as North Snyderville Basin CDP. The population was 1,694 at the 2020 census.

== Geography ==
According to the United States Census Bureau, the CDP has a total area of 16.5 square miles (43 km^{2}), all land.

== Demographics ==
=== 2020 census ===
As of the 2020 census, Silver Summit had a population of 1,694. The median age was 43.6 years. 25.8% of residents were under the age of 18 and 14.7% of residents were 65 years of age or older. For every 100 females there were 103.9 males, and for every 100 females age 18 and over there were 100.2 males age 18 and over.

31.7% of residents lived in urban areas, while 68.3% lived in rural areas.

There were 547 households in Silver Summit, of which 40.8% had children under the age of 18 living in them. Of all households, 70.2% were married-couple households, 12.1% were households with a male householder and no spouse or partner present, and 10.6% were households with a female householder and no spouse or partner present. About 13.7% of all households were made up of individuals and 6.0% had someone living alone who was 65 years of age or older.

There were 663 housing units, of which 17.5% were vacant. The homeowner vacancy rate was 1.0% and the rental vacancy rate was 0.0%.

Racial composition as of the 2020 census
Race	Number	Percent
White	1,484	87.6%
Black or African American	2	0.1%
American Indian and Alaska Native	9	0.5%
Asian	31	1.8%
Native Hawaiian and Other Pacific Islander	0	0.0%
Some other race	33	1.9%
Two or more races	135	8.0%
Hispanic or Latino (of any race)	100	5.9%

=== 2000 census ===
As of the 2000 census, there were 1,821 people, 690 households, and 436 families residing in the CDP. The population density was 110.7 people per square mile (42.7/km^{2}). There were 800 housing units at an average density of 48.6/sq mi (18.8/km^{2}). The racial makeup of the CDP was 94.23% White, 0.33% Native American, 1.21% Asian, 0.05% Pacific Islander, 2.91% from other races, and 1.26% from two or more races. Hispanic or Latino of any race were 5.88% of the population.

There were 690 households, out of which 32.8% had children under the age of 18 living with them, 55.7% were married couples living together, 5.1% had a female householder with no husband present, and 36.7% were non-families. 24.8% of all households were made up of individuals, and 0.6% had someone living alone who was 65 years of age or older. The average household size was 2.64 and the average family size was 3.25.

In the CDP, the population was spread out, with 26.6% under the age of 18, 9.8% from 18 to 24, 39.8% from 25 to 44, 21.7% from 45 to 64, and 2.1% who were 65 years of age or older. The median age was 32 years. For every 100 females, there were 109.3 males. For every 100 females age 18 and over, there were 112.2 males.

The median income for a household in the CDP was $62,891, and the median income for a family was $83,255. Males had a median income of $42,008 versus $40,833 for females. The per capita income for the CDP was $34,794. About 1.5% of families and 3.6% of the population were below the poverty line, including 5.0% of those under age 18 and none of those age 65 or over.

== Education ==
The vast majority is within the Park City School District while a portion is in the North Summit School District and a very small portion is in the South Summit School District. Park City High School is the first district's comprehensive high school.

== See also ==
- List of census-designated places in Utah
