= Jonathan Ruiz =

Jonathan Ruiz may refer to:

- Jonathan Ruiz (footballer, born 1982), Spanish footballer
- Jonathan Ruiz (footballer, born 1995), Aruban international football player
