= Carbonville, Utah =

- Census-designated place
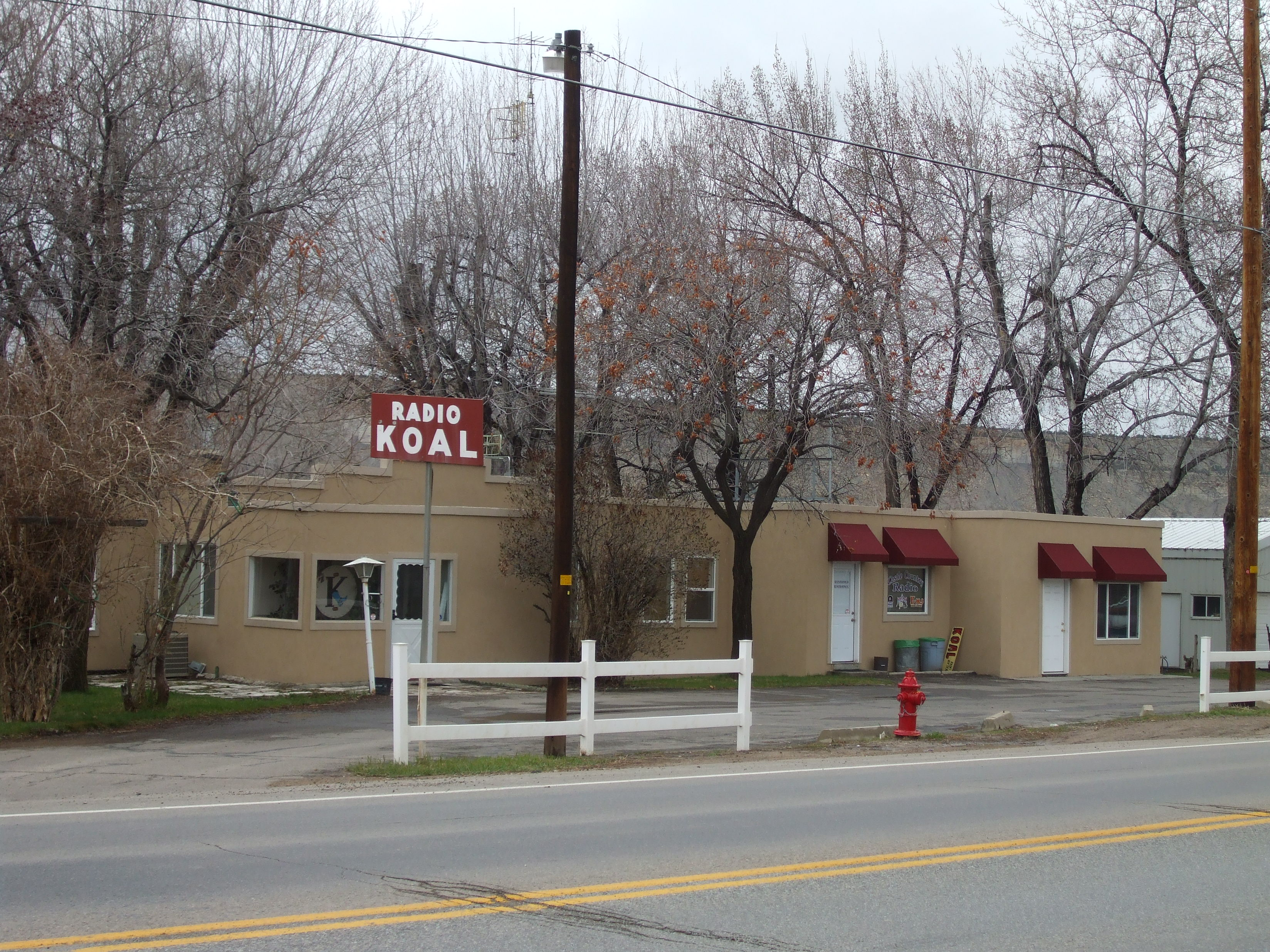
- KOAL Radio studio in Carbonville

- Location in Carbon County and the state of Utah

- Location of Utah in the United States
- Coordinates: 39°37′21″N 110°50′05″W
- Country: United States
- State: Utah
- County: Carbon
- Named for: Carbon County

Area
  - Total: 5.6 sq mi (14.4 km^{2})
  - Land: 5.6 sq mi (14.4 km^{2})
  - Water: 0 sq mi (0.0 km^{2})
- Elevation: 5,670 ft (1,730 m)

Population (2020)
  - Total: 1,383
  - Density: 282/sq mi (108.8/km^{2})
- Time zone: UTC-7 (Mountain (MST))
  - Summer (DST): UTC-6 (MDT)
- ZIP code: 84501
- Area code: 435
- GNIS feature ID: 2584758

Carbonville is a census-designated place in Carbon County, Utah, United States. The population was 1,383 at the 2020 census.

== Geography ==
Carbonville lies just northwest of Price, the county seat of Carbon County. The Price River and U.S. Route 6 run past on the west, and the historic community of Spring Glen is to the north.

== History ==
Carbonville was one of the first settlement sites in what became Carbon County. Caleb Rhoades built a dugout here in 1877, before moving on to found Price in 1879. Later called "Rhoades Meadow", the place had plenty of water, but of poor quality.

The village grew slowly, with most immigrants preferring the more developed areas of Price and Spring Glen. Carbonville did experience rapid growth in the industrial and housing boom years after World War II. The Church of Jesus Christ of Latter-day Saints organized the first ward here in the late 1940s, and a second one in the 1950s.

== Demographics ==
Historical population
Census	Pop.	Note	%±
2010	1,567		—
2020	1,383		−11.7%

As of the census of 2010, there were 1,567 people living in the CDP. There were 669 housing units. The racial makeup of the CDP was 90.0% White, 0.3% Black or African American, 1.6% American Indian and Alaska Native, 0.1% Asian, 0.1% Native Hawaiian and Other Pacific Islander, 5.7% from some other race, and 2.2% from two or more races. Hispanic or Latino of any race were 12.3% of the population.

== See also ==
- List of census-designated places in Utah
