= Utah State Route 122 =

State highway in Utah, United States

State Route 122
- SR 122 highlighted in red

Route information
- Maintained by UDOT
- Length: 8.751 mi (14.083 km)
- Existed: 1933–present

Major junctions
- West end: Mohrland Road in Hiawatha
- East end: SR-10 near Price

Location
- Country: United States
- State: Utah
- County: Carbon

Highway system
- Utah State Highway System; Interstate; US; State; Minor; Scenic
← SR-121	→ SR-123

State Route 122 (SR-122) is a state highway in the U.S. state of Utah, connecting the ghost town of Hiawatha with SR-10.

== Route description ==
SR-122 begins at the east right-of-way line of the Utah Railway, opposite the coal mine and ghost town of Hiawatha in the Manti-La Sal National Forest. It heads east in generally straight lines, gradually descending a ridge from the foothills of Gentry Mountain into the Castle Valley. About two-thirds of the way to the end at SR-10, SR-122 meets a county road from Wattis, another former mining town.

== History ==
A pair of roads connecting the coal mining company town of Hiawatha with SR-10 was added to the state highway system in 1931, initially numbered SR-123 but changed to State Route 122 in 1933. One branch headed east along present SR-122; the other turned south at Hiawatha Junction (just east of the Utah Railway crossing) and passed east of Mohrland to end at SR-10 near Huntington. The latter branch was split off as State Route 236 in 1945 and removed from the state highway system in 1969. Another branch, running southeast from Wattis to SR-122, became State Route 50 in 1935 and was also deleted in 1969. A short truncation was made to SR-122 at its west end in 1993, after Hiawatha was disincorporated, so that the U.S. Fuel Company could gate the former Main Street. The end was moved from near a curve on Main Street north of Center Street to the east right-of-way line at the railroad crossing.

== Major intersections ==
The entire route is in Carbon County.

Location	mi	km	Destinations	Notes
Hiawatha	0.000	0.000	Mohrland Road (former SR-236 – Huntington)	Western terminus
	5.903	9.500	Former SR-50 – Wattis	
	8.751	14.083	SR-10	Eastern terminus
1.000 mi = 1.609 km; 1.000 km = 0.621 mi
