= Utah State Route 10 =

State highway in Utah, United States

State Route 10
- Map of Utah State Route 10

Route information
- Maintained by UDOT
- Length: 68.816 mi (110.749 km)
- Existed: 1910 as a state highway; 1920s as SR-10–present

Major junctions
- South end: I-70 / US 50 / SR-72 at Fremont Junction
- SR-31 in Huntington; US 6 / US 191 in Price
- North end: US 6 Bus. / SR-55 in Price

Location
- Country: United States
- State: Utah
- Counties: Sevier, Emery, Carbon

Highway system
- Utah State Highway System; Interstate; US; State; Minor; Scenic
← SR-9	→ SR-12

State Route 10 (SR-10) is a State Highway in the U.S. state of Utah. The highway follows a long valley in Eastern Utah between the Wasatch Plateau on the west and the San Rafael Swell on the east.

The highway serves the primary and most active coal producing region in Utah, accounting for about 2% of the coal supply of the United States Several of the routes that spur from SR-10 to cross the Wasatch Plateau have been honored for their role in energy production. SR-31 has been named The Energy Loop as part of the National Scenic Byways program. Just off SR-10, along SR-29 is the location of the Wilberg Mine fire of 1984. According to a roadside memorial fire is the worst coal mine tragedy in Utah's history. More recently the highway was mentioned in worldwide news as part of coverage of the Crandall Canyon Mine collapse of 2007.

Though the highway is not generally used for long haul traffic, the increase in coal extraction along the SR-10 corridor has caused the Utah Department of Transportation to push for funding for improvements calling it one of the most dangerous freight corridors in Utah The northern portion of the highway is loosely paralleled by the Utah Railway that helps service the numerous coal mines along the highway corridor.

== Route description ==
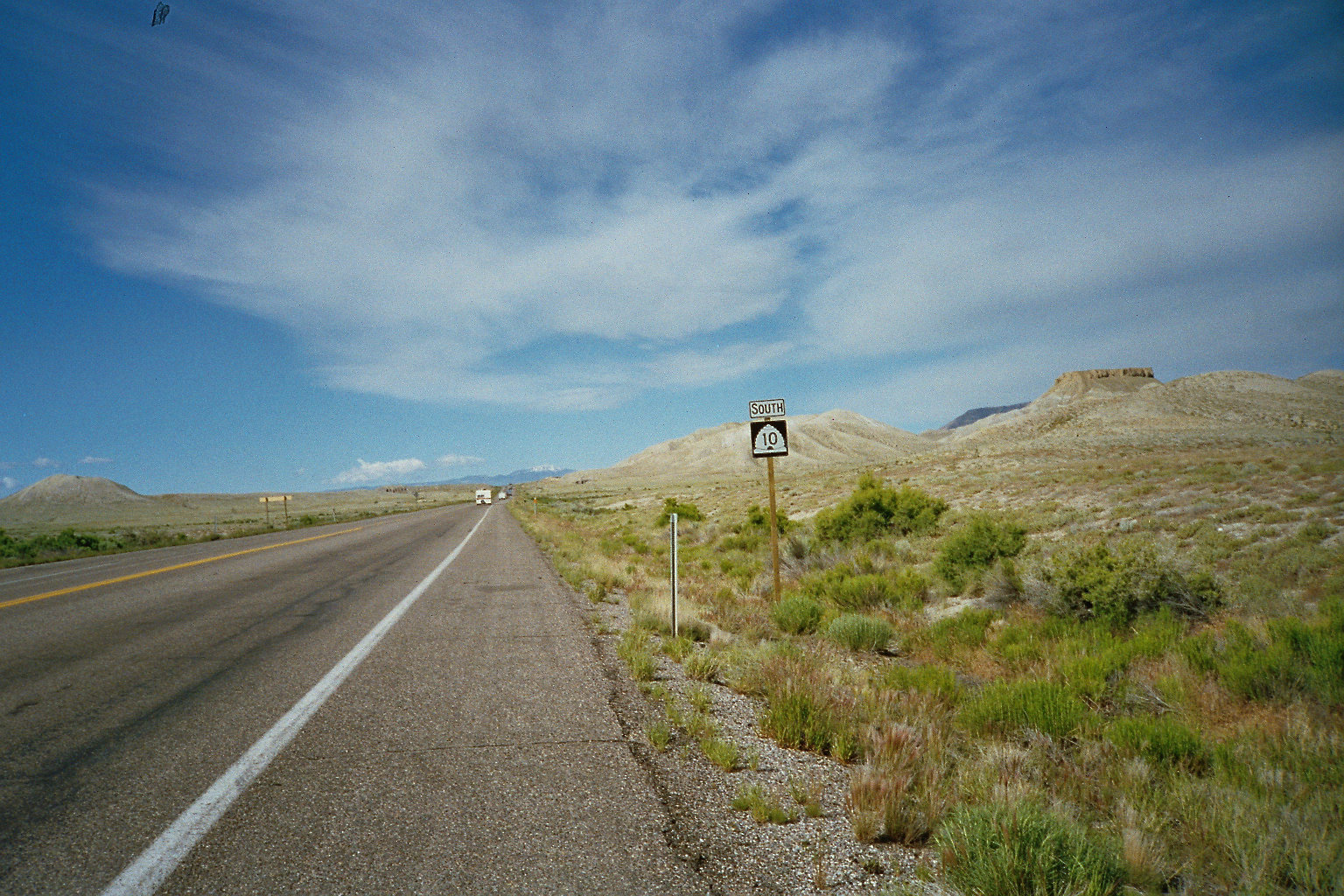
State Route 10 in Emery County,

The highway begins at a junction with I-70 as a continuation of SR-72. The highway follows Castle Valley, a valley defined by the Wasatch Plateau and the San Rafael Swell. The road proceeds in a north east direction passing along several small coal mining communities. The highway also forms the boundary of Huntington State Park. The road terminates in Price at SR-55 which is an old routing of US-6/50 in downtown Price.

The entire route has been listed as part of the National Highway System.

== History ==
The road from Price to Salina was added to the state highway system in 1910 in Carbon and Emery Counties and 1912 in Sevier County. The State Road Commission gave it the SR-10 designation in the 1920s. In 1962, the portion from Salina to near Fremont Junction was transferred to the proposed route of I-70.

== Major intersections ==
County	Location	mi	km	Exit	Destinations	Notes
Sevier		0.000	0.000		I-70 / US 50 / SR-72 south – Salina, Green River, Denver, Loa	Southern terminus
Emery		34.700	55.844	34	SR-57 north – Orangeville	Diamond interchange
Emery		41.233	66.358		SR-29 west – Orangeville, Joes Valley Reservoir	
Emery	Huntington	47.583	76.577		SR-31 west – Cleveland Reservoir, Huntington Reservoir	
Emery		49.383	79.474		SR-155 east – Elmo, Cleveland, Huntington State Park	
Emery		56.600	91.089		SR-155 south – Elmo, Cleveland	
Carbon		60.937	98.069		SR-122 west – Hiawatha	
Carbon	Price	67.913	109.295		US 6 / US 191 – Salt Lake City, Wellington	Interchange
Carbon	Price	68.816	110.749		SR-55 / US 6 Bus. (100 North)	Northern terminus
1.000 mi = 1.609 km; 1.000 km = 0.621 mi

== See also ==
- List of state highways in Utah
