= Utah State Route 155 =

State highway in Utah, United States

State Route 155
- Cleveland Loop
- SR-155 highlighted in red

Route information
- Maintained by UDOT
- Length: 10.718 mi (17.249 km)
- Existed: 1933–present

Major junctions
- West end: SR-10 in Huntington
- North end: SR-10 at Washboard Junction

Location
- Country: United States
- State: Utah

Highway system
- Utah State Highway System; Interstate; US; State; Minor; Scenic
← SR-154	→ SR-156

State Route 155 (SR-155) or the Cleveland Loop is a 10.718-mile-long (17.249 km) state highway in the U.S. state of Utah. It forms a loop off SR-10 in Emery County, connecting it with the town of Cleveland.

== Route description ==
State Route 155 starts at SR-10 near Huntington Reservoir just north of the town of Huntington. From there it travels east toward the town of Cleveland, entering the town as Main Street, then turning north on Center Street. The route leaves Cleveland travelling north, passing about 1 mile (1.6 km) west of the town of Elmo before turning back northwest towards SR-10 and ending at Washboard Junction at the intersection of SR-10 and SR-155.

== History ==
State Route 155 was established by the Utah state legislature on June 26, 1933 as the "Cleveland Loop". The description was revised in 1953 to reflect the current designated route, namely, Huntington on Route 10 to Cleveland to Washboard Junction on Route 10. Only two minor alignment changes have taken place since then. In 1965 the west end of the route, where it meets SR-10, was moved southeast to accommodate the realignment of SR-10 due to the construction of Huntington Reservoir (former route SR-236, which shared the same intersection with SR-10 and SR-155, was also realigned at the same time). In 1969, the north end of SR-155 was moved slightly to the northwest to accommodate a realignment of SR-10 due to new construction.

== Major Intersections ==
The entire route is in Emery County.

Location	mi	km	Destinations	Notes
Huntington	0.000	0.000	SR-10 – Huntington, Price	Western terminus
Washboard Junction	10.718	17.249	SR-10 – Huntington, Price	Northern terminus
1.000 mi = 1.609 km; 1.000 km = 0.621 mi
