= Utah State Route 57 =

State highway in Utah, United States

State Route 57
- SR 57 highlighted in red

Route information
- Maintained by UDOT
- Length: 10.691 mi (17.205 km)
- Existed: 1931–present

Major junctions
- South end: SR-10 near Castle Dale
- SR-29 in Orangeville
- North end: Wilberg Mine near Orangeville

Location
- Country: United States
- State: Utah

Highway system
- Utah State Highway System; Interstate; US; State; Minor; Scenic
← SR-56	→ SR-58

State Route 57 (SR-57) is a state highway in Emery County in the U.S. state of Utah. It runs for 10.69 miles (17.20 km) from the junction with SR-10 three miles (5 km) south of Castle Dale to the Wilberg Coal Mine, northwest of Orangeville.

== Route description ==
SR-57 begins at the junction with SR-10 near the Hunter Power Plant, three miles (5 km) southwest of Castle Dale, and runs almost straight north for almost four miles (6 km) until it nears Orangeville. It then bypasses Orangeville heading northwest. At the junction of SR-10 it turns north again and then moves in a north-northwest direction until it reaches its terminus at the southern edge of the Wilberg Mine, about 10 miles (16 km) northwest of Orangeville (the Wilberg Mine is the location of the fire that took twenty seven lives in 1984).

== History ==
The road from SR-29 at Orangeville Junction south through Orangeville (along Main Street) to SR-10 was added to the state highway system in 1927 as a spur of SR-29, and in 1931 it was split off as SR-57. In 1978, the Utah Transportation Commission adopted a realignment onto a bypass of Orangeville, with a new northern terminus on SR-29 at the county road to the Wilberg Mine. An interchange was built at the new SR-29 junction in 1978, and said county road became an extension of SR-57 in 1982.

== Major intersections ==
The entire route is in Emery County.

Location	mi	km	Destinations	Notes
	0.000	0.000	SR-10 (State Street) – Emery, Price	Southern terminus; SR-10 Exit 34
	2.700	4.345	South Main Street (Orangeville)	
	6.588– 6.852	10.602– 11.027	SR-29 – Castle Dale, Joes Valley Dam	Modified diamond interchange
	10.691	17.205	Wilberg Mine	Northern terminus
1.000 mi = 1.609 km; 1.000 km = 0.621 mi
