= Mohrland, Utah =

- Ghost town
- Location within Utah Location within the United States
- Coordinates: 39°26′25″N 111°00′55″W
- Country: United States
- State: Utah
- County: Emery
- Established: 1907
- Abandoned: 1938
- Named for: Mays, Orem, Heiner, Rice
- Elevation: 7,190 ft (2,190 m)
- GNIS feature ID: 1437639

Mohrland is a ghost town located in Emery County, Utah, United States. Lying in Cedar Creek Canyon near the Carbon County line, Mohrland was Emery County's largest coal mining town, with a history more typical of Carbon County's coal camps than of most Emery County communities.

== History ==
Coal mining in Cedar Creek Canyon began on a small scale sometime before 1896, producing coal mainly for local home heating use. In 1907 an investment group bought the mine and surrounding land. They incorporated as the Castle Valley Fuel Company and surveyed a townsite called Mohrland. The name was formed as an acronym from the initials of the surnames of the company's principal investors: Mays, Orem, Heiner, and Rice.

Coal started shipping by April 1910, and despite Castle Valley Fuel's financial problems, the town continued growing. A business district was soon established in Mohrland, including a hospital, company boarding house, Errol Charlestrom's Wasatch Store, a post office, and several saloons. In 1915 ownership of the mine was transferred to the United States Fuel Company, which also ran the town of Hiawatha just to the north. By 1920 Mohrland had over 200 houses, a large amusement hall, and a school. The population was about 1000.

Mohrland was a company town throughout its history; the mine owners essentially ran the town. The company worked to make it a pleasant place to live, despite its location at the edge of the desert. The streets were lined with shade trees, and a small stream ran along the canyon bottom. Mine employees' benefits included medical services, as well as regularly scheduled dances, films, and other social events. Mohrland's company baseball team was particularly popular and successful. In the spring of 1915, as champions of the Carbon County league, they played an exhibition game at Price against the Chicago White Sox, drawing an audience of over 10,000, but losing by a score of 17 to 1.

The most successful years were the early 1920s, but by 1925 coal prices and profits were down. On March 1, 1925, U.S. Fuel closed down the mine without warning, leaving Mohrland's residents without jobs and without credit at the company store. Many people had no money or food. The company reopened Mohrland just as suddenly in September 1926, and the town struggled back to its feet. In 1930 the population was 620.

Coal production continued to become less profitable during the Great Depression. In 1938 U.S. Fuel announced a decision to close Mohrland and consolidate mining operations at Hiawatha, which had a slightly shorter shipping route and more room to build a new preparation plant. The buildings were sold to a salvage company for $50 each, and very little of the town was left behind.

== See also ==
- List of ghost towns in Utah
