= Utah State Route 55 =

State highway in Utah, United States

State Route 55
- U.S. Route 6 Business

Route information
- Maintained by UDOT
- Length: 2.942 mi (4.735 km)
- Existed: 1975–present

Major junctions
- West end: US 6 / US 191 in Price
- SR-10 in Price
- East end: US 6 / US 191 in Price

Location
- Country: United States
- State: Utah

Highway system
- Utah State Highway System; Interstate; US; State; Minor; Scenic
← SR-54	→ SR-56

State Route 55 is a short highway that loops around the town of Price in central Utah, United States, beginning and ending at US-6/US-191 in a span of three miles (5 km). It is an old routing of US-6 and US-50. The entire route is co-signed with U.S. Route 6 Business.

== Route description ==
From its western terminus at the offramp of US-6/US-191, the highway goes east on 100 North. At its junction 300 East, it turns south briefly before returning east on Main Street. It continues on Main Street, which veers to the south until meeting again with another grade-separated intersection.

The route is listed as part of the National Highway System.

== History ==
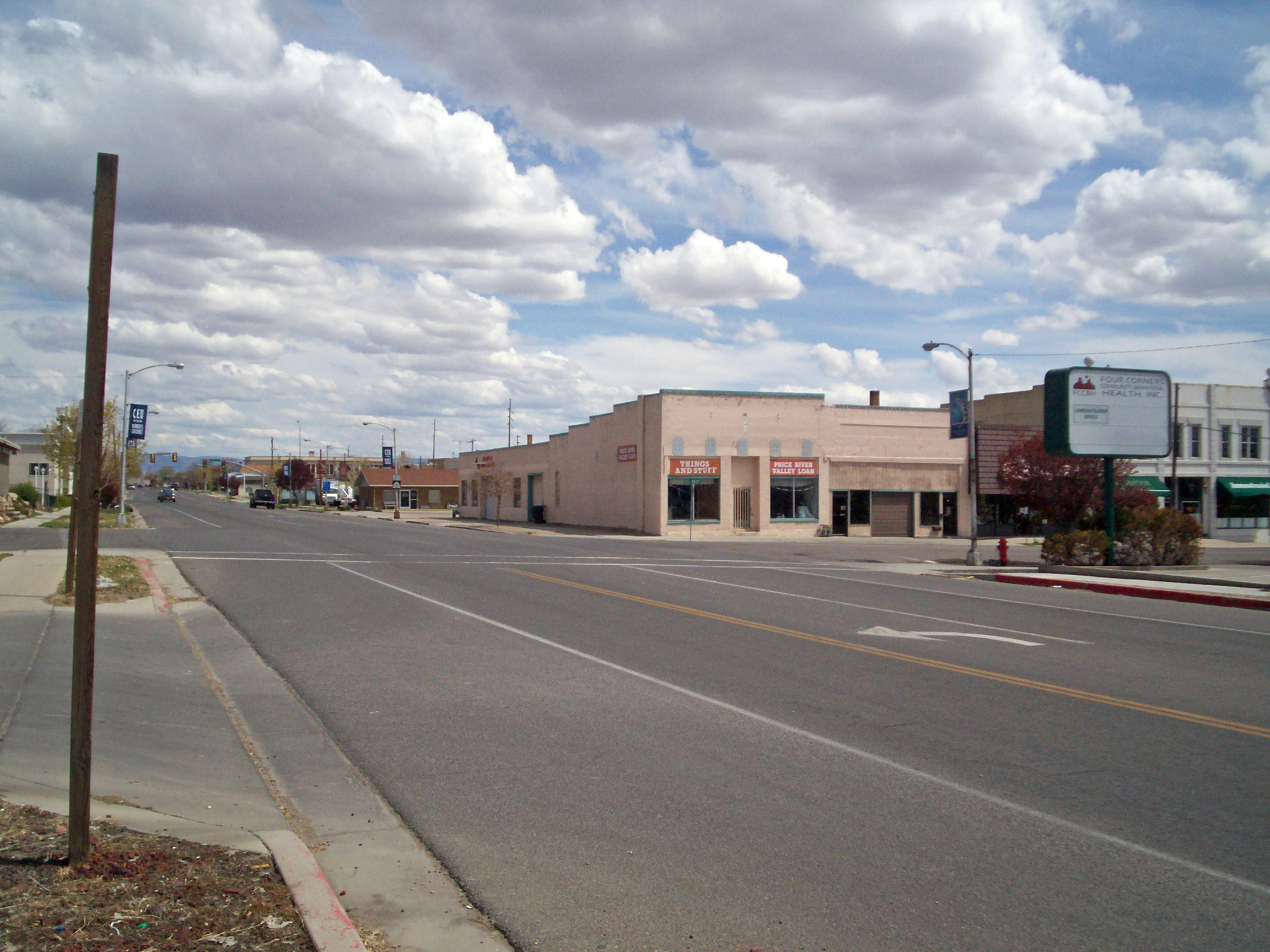
Looking eastbound on SR-55 in Price toward SR-10

The route through downtown Price had been designated SR-8 early in the state highway system's history; it would also become US-50 in 1926 and US-6 in 1937. The underlying state route designation was changed to SR-27 in 1969, but otherwise the routes did not change. However, by the 1970s, a new super-two bypass of the city center was being built for long-distance through traffic. As a result, the U.S. routes were moved onto this bypass, and the modern iteration of SR-55 was created in 1975 on the old routing of US 6/50. Since then, the route has not been changed.

== Major intersections ==
The entire route is in Price, Carbon County.

mi	km	Destinations	Notes
0.000– 0.059	0.000– 0.095	US 6 / US 191 (Dinosaur Diamond Prehistoric Highway) – Provo, Duchesne	Western terminus; Grade-separated intersection
0.913	1.469	SR-10 south (Carbon Avenue) – Huntington	
2.942	4.735	US 6 / US 191 (Dinosaur Diamond Prehistoric Highway) – Moab, Grand Junction	Eastern terminus
1.000 mi = 1.609 km; 1.000 km = 0.621 mi
