= Utah State Route 76 =

State highway in Sevier County, Utah, U.S.

State Route 76

Route information
- Maintained by UDOT
- Length: 2.431 mi (3.912 km)
- Existed: 1977–present

Major junctions
- West end: I-70 / US 50 near Fremont Junction
- East end: SR-72 at Fremont Junction

Location
- Country: United States
- State: Utah

Highway system
- Utah State Highway System; Interstate; US; State; Minor; Scenic
← SR-75	→ SR-77

State Route 76 (SR-76) is a state highway in the U.S. state of Utah that serves as a connector from I-70 to SR-72 at Fremont Junction. This road was given the SR-76 designation in 1977, coinciding with the construction of I-70 through the area. Previously the route was a portion of State Route 10, which prior to truncation extended to Salina.

== Route description ==
The route begins at the northern end of the diamond interchange with exit 86 and briefly heads south before turning east on a frontage road paralleling I-70's southern side. Just past this turn is a rest area, constructed for motorists traveling on I-70. The route continues to hug the freeway's southern side for 2 miles (3.22 km) until intersecting with SR-72, where it terminates.

== History ==
This route was originally part of State Route 10, which at the time had a southern terminus in Salina. When I-70 was under construction, route 10 was truncated to remove the portion that would be replaced by I-70. What is now numbered State Route 76 was formed in 1977, keeping this portion of the old highway under state maintenance, with the intent to connect I-70 to SR-72 while providing a rest area to motorists along the way.

== Major intersections ==
The entire route is in Sevier County.

Location	mi	km	Destinations	Notes
	0.000	0.000	I-70 – Salina, Green River	Western terminus
Fremont Junction	2.431	3.912	SR-72 – Loa	Eastern terminus
1.000 mi = 1.609 km; 1.000 km = 0.621 mi
