= Utah State Route 29 =

State highway in Utah, United States

State Route 29

Route information
- Maintained by UDOT
- Length: 21.732 mi (34.974 km)
- Existed: 1915 as a state highway; 1927 as SR-29–present

Major junctions
- West end: Emery-Sanpete county line
- SR-57 at Orangeville
- East end: SR-10 north of Castle Dale

Location
- Country: United States
- State: Utah

Highway system
- Utah State Highway System; Interstate; US; State; Minor; Scenic
← SR-28	→ SR-30

State Route 29 (SR-29) is a state highway in Emery County in the U.S. state of Utah. It runs for 21.732 miles (34.974 km) from the Sanpete-Emery County line near Joe's Valley Reservoir to SR-10 three miles (5 km) north of Castle Dale.

== Route description ==
SR-29 begins at the Emery County line, in the Manti-La Sal National Forest, paralleling the San Rafael River. Near the county line is also Joe's Valley State Park and Joe's Valley Reservoir, where the road diverts around the reservoir to the north, then resumes an east south-easterly course about 18 miles (29 km) into Orangeville. Just off SR-29, about 10 miles (16 km) west north-west of Orangeville, is the Wilberg Mine, location of a fire that took 27 lives in 1984. Just west of Orangeville SR-29 intersects with SR-57. After Orangeville it continues about four miles (6 km) to where it terminates at the junction with State Route 10, four miles (6 km) east of Orangeville, and three miles (5 km) north of Castle Dale.

== History ==
The road from SR-11 (by 1926 US-89) in Ephraim to SR-10 at Castle Dale Junction was added to the state highway system in 1915. The state legislature numbered it SR-29 in 1927, along with a branch from Orangeville Junction south to SR-10. The branch was split off as SR-57 in 1931. Due to the creation of Joe's Valley Reservoir, a new alignment was defined in 1965, adding about 4 miles (6.5 km) to the length; the legislature removed the portion west of the reservoir (Ephraim Canyon Road) from the state highway system in 1969.

== Major intersections ==
The entire route is in Emery County.

Location	mi	km	Destinations	Notes
Joe's Valley	0.000	0.000	Orangeville Road	Western terminus
Orangeville	14.727– 14.823	23.701– 23.855	SR-57 (Main Street)	
Cache Creek	21.673– 21.732	34.879– 34.974	SR-10 – Castle Dale, Price	Eastern terminus
1.000 mi = 1.609 km; 1.000 km = 0.621 mi
