= Sevier County, Utah =

County in Utah, United States

- County
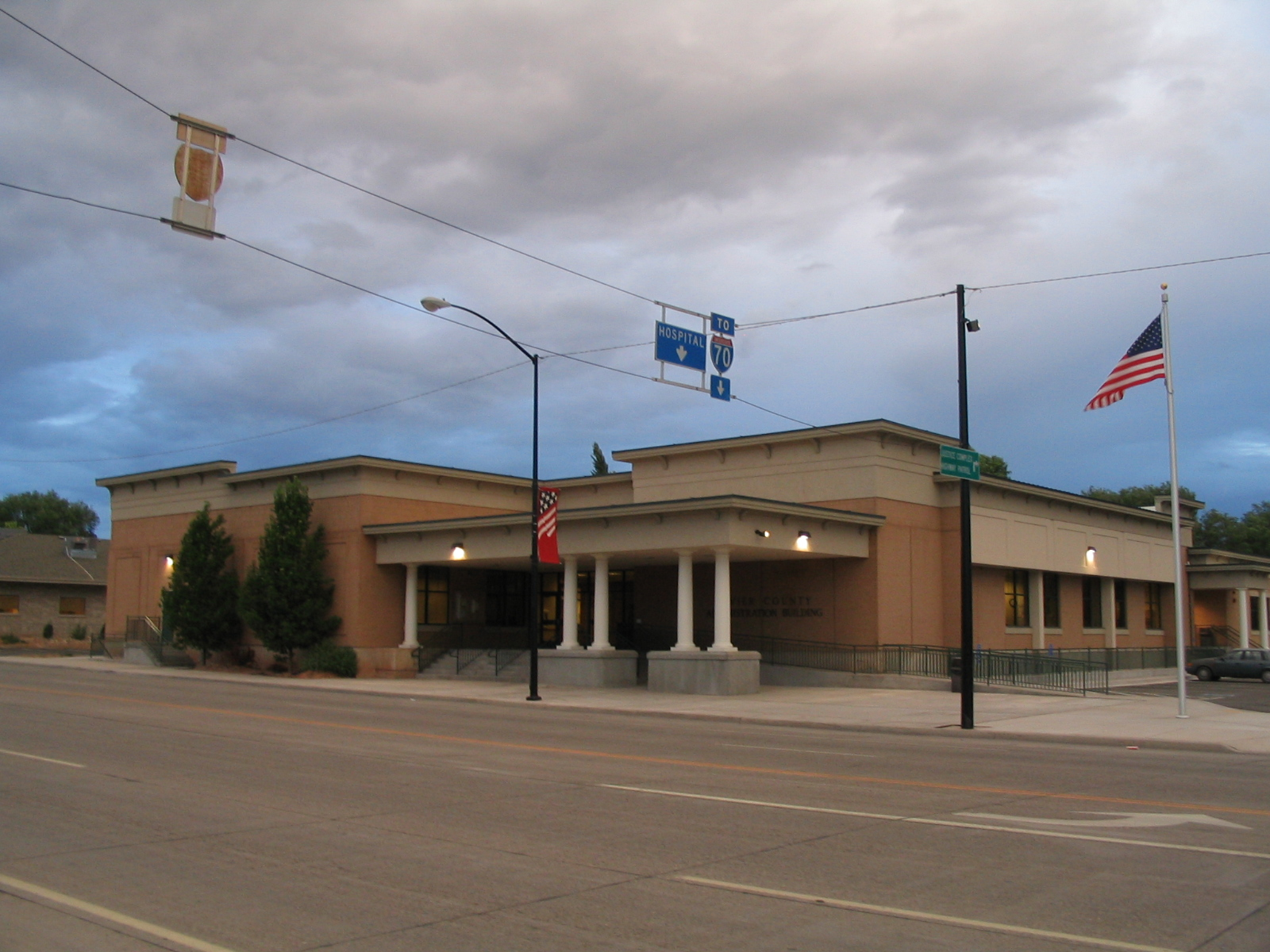
- Sevier County Courthouse in Richfield

- Location within the U.S. state of Utah
- Coordinates: 38.75°N 111.80°W
- Country: United States
- State: Utah
- Founded: January 16, 1865
- Named for: Sevier River
- Seat: Richfield
- Largest city: Richfield

Area
  - Total: 1,918 sq mi (4,970 km^{2})
  - Land: 1,911 sq mi (4,950 km^{2})
  - Water: 7.8 sq mi (20 km^{2}) 0.4%

Population (2020)
  - Total: 21,522
  - Estimate (2025): 22,827 ▲
  - Density: 11.3/sq mi (4.4/km^{2})
- Time zone: UTC−7 (Mountain)
  - Summer (DST): UTC−6 (MDT)
- Congressional district: 2nd
- Website: www.sevier.utah.gov

Sevier County (/sɛˈvɪər/ sə-VEER) is a county in Utah, United States. As of the 2020 United States census, the population was 21,522. Its county seat and largest city is Richfield.

Pando, a clonal quaking aspen stand, that, according to some sources, is the oldest (80,000 years) and largest (106 acres, 13 million pounds) organism on Earth, is located in this county.

== History ==
Evidence of indigenous peoples residing in Sevier County up to 5,000 BP has been unearthed. The Fremont culture of Native Americans occupied the area from about 2000 to 700 BP. The Clear Creek site contains native petroglyphs from that period.

In Utah, the Numic- (or Shoshonean) speaking peoples of the Uto-Aztecan language family evolved into four distinct groups in the historical period: the Northern Shoshone, Goshute or Western Shoshone, Southern Paiute, and Ute peoples. This territory's central and eastern sections were occupied primarily by various bands of the Ute.

The first modern sighting of the Sevier River was most likely by the Catholic fathers Silvestre Vélez de Escalante and Francisco Atanasio Domínguez, on their expedition to California in 1776. The Old Spanish Trail was the route they mapped. Over the next century, this trail carried fur trappers, hunters, government officials, traders, and settlers.

Settlement of this area began when Richfield was first settled. Mormon settlers (The Church of Jesus Christ of Latter Day Saints) arrived on June 15, 1864, most of whom had emigrated from Scandinavian countries. Because of the growth in this small community, the people soon petitioned Utah Territory officials about a separate county.

On January 16, 1865, the Utah Territory legislature created the county, with the area annexed from Sanpete County. It was named for the Sevier River. The county seat was Big Spring (later named Richfield). The county borders were adjusted in 1866, 1880, 1890, and in 1921. A clarification of boundary lines corresponding to government survey lines was completed in 1931, marking the present configuration of Sevier County.

Although the county was in place by 1865, much of Sevier County was abandoned in the Black Hawk War in 1867. Attempts to resettle the area were not successful until 1870. By 1874, 753 residents lived in the area.

== Geography ==
Sevier County terrain consists of semi-arid but arable rolling areas punctuated by northeast–southwest mountain ridges, usually forested. The highest point is Fish Lake Hightop in the Central Utah Plateau, at 11,633 ft (3,546 m) ASL. The county has a total area of 1,918 square miles (4,970 km^{2}), of which 1,911 square miles (4,950 km^{2}) is land and 7.8 square miles (20 km^{2}) (0.4%) is water.

=== Major highways ===
- I-70
- I-70 BL / SR-120
- US 50
- US 89
- SR-10
- SR-24
- SR-62
- SR-72
- SR-76
- SR-118
- SR-119

=== Adjacent counties ===
- Sanpete County – north
- Emery County – east
- Wayne County – southeast
- Piute County – south
- Beaver County – southwest
- Millard County – west

=== Protected areas ===
- Capitol Reef National Park (part)
- Fishlake National Forest (part)
- Fremont Indian State Park and Museum
- Koosharem Reservoir Recreation Site
- Manti-La Sal National Forest (part)
- Sand Ledges Recreation Area
- Willow Creek Wildlife Management Area

=== Lakes ===
- Abes Reservoir
- Acord Lakes
- Annabella Reservoir
- Bear Valley Reservoir
- Big Lake
- Boobe Hole Reservoir
- Broadhead Lakes
- Cold Spring (near Twin Ponds)
- Coots Slough
- Crater Lakes
- Davis Hollow Reservoir
- Deep Lake
- Duck Lake
- Emerald Lakes
- Farnsworth Reservoir
- Farrell Pond
- Fish Lake
- Floating Island Lake
- Forsyth Reservoir
- Gardner Hollow Reservoirs
- Gates Lake
- Hamilton Reservoir
- Harves River Reservoir
- Hepplers Ponds
- Hunts Lakes
- Indian Springs
- Jeffery Reservoir
- Jensen Spring
- Johnson Valley Reservoir
- Killian Spring
- Koosharem Reservoir
- Lake Louise
- Lost Creek Reservoir
- Lower Hunts Lake
- Magelby Reservoir
- Meeks Lake
- Mill Meadow Reservoir (part)
- Morrell Pond
- Mud Lake
- Oles Pond
- Ox Spring
- Paradise Valley Lake
- Redmond Lake
- Rex Reservoir
- Rim Seep
- Rocky Ford Reservoir
- Saleratus Reservoir
- Salina Reservoir
- Sargent Lake
- Scrub Flat Reservoir
- Sheep Valley Reservoir
- Silas Spring
- Skutumpah Reservoir
- Slide Lake
- Snow Fence Pond
- Snow Lake
- Solomon Reservoir
- Spring Reservoir
- The Potholes
- Three Creeks Reservoir
- Three Lakes (two of the three)
- Tidwell Pond
- Twin Lake
- Twin Ponds
- Washburn Reservoir
- Willies Flat Reservoir
- Willow Creek Reservoir
- Willow Lake
- Wood Hollow Reservoir

== Demographics ==
Historical population
Census	Pop.	Note	%±
1870	19		—
1880	4,457		23,357.9%
1890	6,199		39.1%
1900	8,451		36.3%
1910	9,775		15.7%
1920	11,281		15.4%
1930	11,199		−0.7%
1940	12,112		8.2%
1950	12,072		−0.3%
1960	10,565		−12.5%
1970	10,103		−4.4%
1980	14,727		45.8%
1990	15,431		4.8%
2000	18,842		22.1%
2010	20,802		10.4%
2020	21,522		3.5%
2025 (est.)	22,827	▲	6.1%
US Decennial Census; 1790–1960 1900–1990; 1990–2000 2010 2020

=== 2020 census ===
According to the 2020 United States census and 2020 American Community Survey, there were 21,522 people in Sevier County with a population density of 11.3 people per square mile (4.3/km^{2}). Among non-Hispanic or Latino people, the racial makeup was 19,396 (90.1%) White, 65 (0.3%) African American, 313 (1.5%) Native American, 40 (0.2%) Asian, 49 (0.2%) Pacific Islander, 49 (0.2%) from other races, and 557 (2.6%) from two or more races. 1,053 (4.9%) people were Hispanic or Latino.

Sevier County, Utah – Racial and ethnic composition Note: the US Census treats Hispanic/Latino as an ethnic category. This table excludes Latinos from the racial categories and assigns them to a separate category. Hispanics/Latinos may be of any race.
Race / Ethnicity (NH = Non-Hispanic)	Pop 2000	Pop 2010	Pop 2020	% 2000	% 2010	% 2020
White alone (NH)	17,752	19,325	19,396	94.22%	92.90%	90.12%
Black or African American alone (NH)	49	34	65	0.26%	0.16%	0.30%
Native American or Alaska Native alone (NH)	346	197	313	1.84%	0.95%	1.45%
Asian alone (NH)	48	58	40	0.25%	0.28%	0.19%
Pacific Islander alone (NH)	16	36	49	0.08%	0.17%	0.23%
Other race alone (NH)	4	1	49	0.02%	0.00%	0.23%
Mixed race or Multiracial (NH)	146	219	557	0.77%	1.05%	2.59%
Hispanic or Latino (any race)	481	932	1,053	2.55%	4.48%	4.89%
Total	18,842	20,802	21,522	100.00%	100.00%	100.00%

There were 10,870 (50.51%) males and 10,652 (49.49%) females, and the population distribution by age was 6,449 (30.0%) under the age of 18, 11,325 (52.6%) from 18 to 64, and 3,748 (17.4%) who were at least 65 years old. The median age was 36.3 years.

There were 7,464 households in Sevier County with an average size of 2.88 of which 5,555 (74.4%) were families and 1,909 (25.6%) were non-families. Among all families, 4,491 (60.2%) were married couples, 362 (4.8%) were male householders with no spouse, and 702 (9.4%) were female householders with no spouse. Among all non-families, 1,640 (22.0%) were a single person living alone and 269 (3.6%) were two or more people living together. 2,777 (37.2%) of all households had children under the age of 18. 5,752 (77.1%) of households were owner-occupied while 1,712 (22.9%) were renter-occupied.

The median income for a Sevier County household was $55,361 and the median family income was $62,058, with a per-capita income of $24,041. The median income for males that were full-time employees was $50,183 and for females $36,000. 14.3% of the population and 12.3% of families were below the poverty line.

In terms of education attainment, out of the 13,469 people in Sevier County 25 years or older, 1,206 (9.0%) had not completed high school, 4,206 (31.2%) had a high school diploma or equivalency, 5,242 (38.9%) had some college or associate degree, 1,931 (14.3%) had a bachelor's degree, and 884 (6.6%) had a graduate or professional degree.

== Features ==
Interstate 70 runs through the county. As Richfield is about halfway between the major cities of Los Angeles, California and Denver, Colorado, it has built a hospitality industry, with motels and restaurants serving travelers.

Fremont Indian State Park is found in the Clear Creek Canyon, adjacent to I-70. It is noted for its archaeological remains from the ancient Native American Fremont culture. Its museum displays found artifacts.

== Politics ==
Sevier County is traditionally Republican. In no national election since 1936 has the county selected the Democratic Party candidate (as of 2024).

State Elected Offices
Position	District	Name	Affiliation	First Elected
Senate	24	Derrin Owens	Republican	2020
House of Representatives	70	Carl Albrecht	Republican	2016
House of Representatives	73	Phil Lyman	Republican	2018
Board of Education	14	Mark Huntsman	Nonpartisan	2014

United States presidential election results for Sevier County, Utah
Year	Republican		Democratic		Third party(ies)	
Year	No.	%	No.	%	No.	%
1896	497	21.10%	1,858	78.90%	0	0.00%
1900	1,581	54.82%	1,261	43.72%	42	1.46%
1904	1,725	59.10%	930	31.86%	264	9.04%
1908	1,780	54.94%	1,272	39.26%	188	5.80%
1912	1,452	41.90%	915	26.41%	1,098	31.69%
1916	1,720	44.79%	2,052	53.44%	68	1.77%
1920	2,506	62.84%	1,425	35.73%	57	1.43%
1924	2,111	56.44%	1,201	32.11%	428	11.44%
1928	2,424	63.13%	1,399	36.43%	17	0.44%
1932	2,225	48.44%	2,303	50.14%	65	1.42%
1936	1,899	39.84%	2,816	59.07%	52	1.09%
1940	2,703	51.70%	2,521	48.22%	4	0.08%
1944	2,345	52.76%	2,095	47.13%	5	0.11%
1948	2,791	58.76%	1,943	40.91%	16	0.34%
1952	3,996	73.44%	1,445	26.56%	0	0.00%
1956	3,646	74.74%	1,232	25.26%	0	0.00%
1960	3,166	65.18%	1,690	34.80%	1	0.02%
1964	2,617	57.33%	1,948	42.67%	0	0.00%
1968	3,190	67.24%	1,167	24.60%	387	8.16%
1972	3,700	72.96%	820	16.17%	551	10.87%
1976	3,686	65.24%	1,564	27.68%	400	7.08%
1980	5,614	80.79%	1,112	16.00%	223	3.21%
1984	5,736	83.49%	1,072	15.60%	62	0.90%
1988	4,747	76.31%	1,403	22.55%	71	1.14%
1992	3,160	50.50%	1,039	16.60%	2,059	32.90%
1996	4,031	65.79%	1,327	21.66%	769	12.55%
2000	5,763	81.43%	1,046	14.78%	268	3.79%
2004	6,597	86.34%	920	12.04%	124	1.62%
2008	6,394	79.35%	1,359	16.87%	305	3.79%
2012	7,207	89.32%	738	9.15%	124	1.54%
2016	6,740	77.52%	695	7.99%	1,260	14.49%
2020	9,052	87.35%	1,084	10.46%	227	2.19%
2024	9,526	87.19%	1,236	11.31%	164	1.50%

== Communities ==
Map of Sevier County communities

=== Cities ===
- Aurora
- Monroe
- Richfield (county seat)
- Salina

=== Towns ===
- Annabella
- Central Valley
- Elsinore
- Glenwood
- Joseph
- Koosharem
- Redmond
- Sigurd

=== Unincorporated communities ===
- Austin
- Burrville
- Cove
- Gooseberry
- Nibley
- Sevier
- Venice

=== Former communities ===
- Prattville
- Vermillion (absorbed into Sigurd)

== Education ==
All of the county is in the Sevier School District.

== See also ==
- National Register of Historic Places listings in Sevier County, Utah
