= Mud Lake (Utah) =

Lake in the state of Utah, United States

There are several lakes named Mud Lake in the U.S. state of Utah.

== Mud Lake (1) ==
Mud Lake is a lake located in Beaver County, Utah, situated on Birch Creek Mountain. The lake is within the Fishlake National Forest.

== Mud Lake (2) ==
Mud Lake is a lake located in Beaver County, Utah. The lake is within the Fishlake National Forest.

== Mud Lake (3) ==
Mud Lake is a lake located in Beaver County, Utah, situated on the Tushar Mountains, between Shelly Baldy and Delano Peaks.

== Mud Lake (4) ==
Mud Lake is a lake located southeast of Beryl, Utah in Escalante Township of Iron County, Utah.

== Mud Lake (5) ==
Mud Lake is a lake located in Duchesne County, Utah. The lake in within the Ashley National Forest

== Mud Lake (6) ==
Mud Lake is a lake located in Garfield County, Utah, situation on the Griffin Top of the Escalante Mountains. The lake is within the Dixie National Forest.

== Mud Lake (7) ==
Mud Lake is a lake located in Garfield County, Utah, situation on the west slope of the Escalante Mountains, facing Johns Valley. The lake is within the Dixie National Forest.

== Mud Lake (8) ==
Mud Lake is a lake located in Garfield County, Utah, situation on the west slope of the Escalante Mountains, facing Johns Valley. The lake is within the Dixie National Forest.

== Mud Lake (9) ==
Mud Lake is a lake located in Grand County, Utah. The lake is within the Manti-La Sal National Forest.

== Mud Lake (10) ==
Mud Lake is a lake located on Parker Mountain in southeastern Piute County, Utah. The lake is within the Fishlake National Forest.

== Mud Lake (11) ==
Mud Lake is a lake located on the Sevier Plateau in Sevier County, Utah. The lake is within the Fishlake National Forest.

== Mud Lake (12) ==
Mud Lake is a lake located in southern Wayne County, Utah.
