= Pinnacle Canyon Academy =

K-12 charter school in Price, Utah

Coordinates: 39.6031°N 110.7995°W

Pinnacle Canyon Academy is a K-12 charter school, located in Price, Utah. Competing in the 1A division of the Utah High School Activities Association for sports, which includes baseball, boys’ and girls basketball, boys’ and girls’ cross country, boys’ and girls’ golf, boys’ and girls’ track, and volleyball. The school’s mascot is the Panthers.
