= Utah State Route 72 =

State highway in Utah, United States

State Route 72
- SR-72 highlighted in red

Route information
- Maintained by UDOT
- Length: 35.393 mi (56.960 km)
- Existed: 1933–present

Major junctions
- South end: SR-24 in Loa
- SR-76 near Ivie Creek Rest Area
- North end: I-70 / US 50 / SR-10 at Fremont Junction

Location
- Country: United States
- State: Utah

Highway system
- Utah State Highway System; Interstate; US; State; Minor; Scenic
← SR-71	→ SR-73

State Route 72 (SR-72) is a 35.393-mile-long (56.960 km) state highway in the U.S. state of Utah. The current alignment is an extension of SR-10. The highway provides access to Loa from Interstate 70 (I-70).

== Route description ==
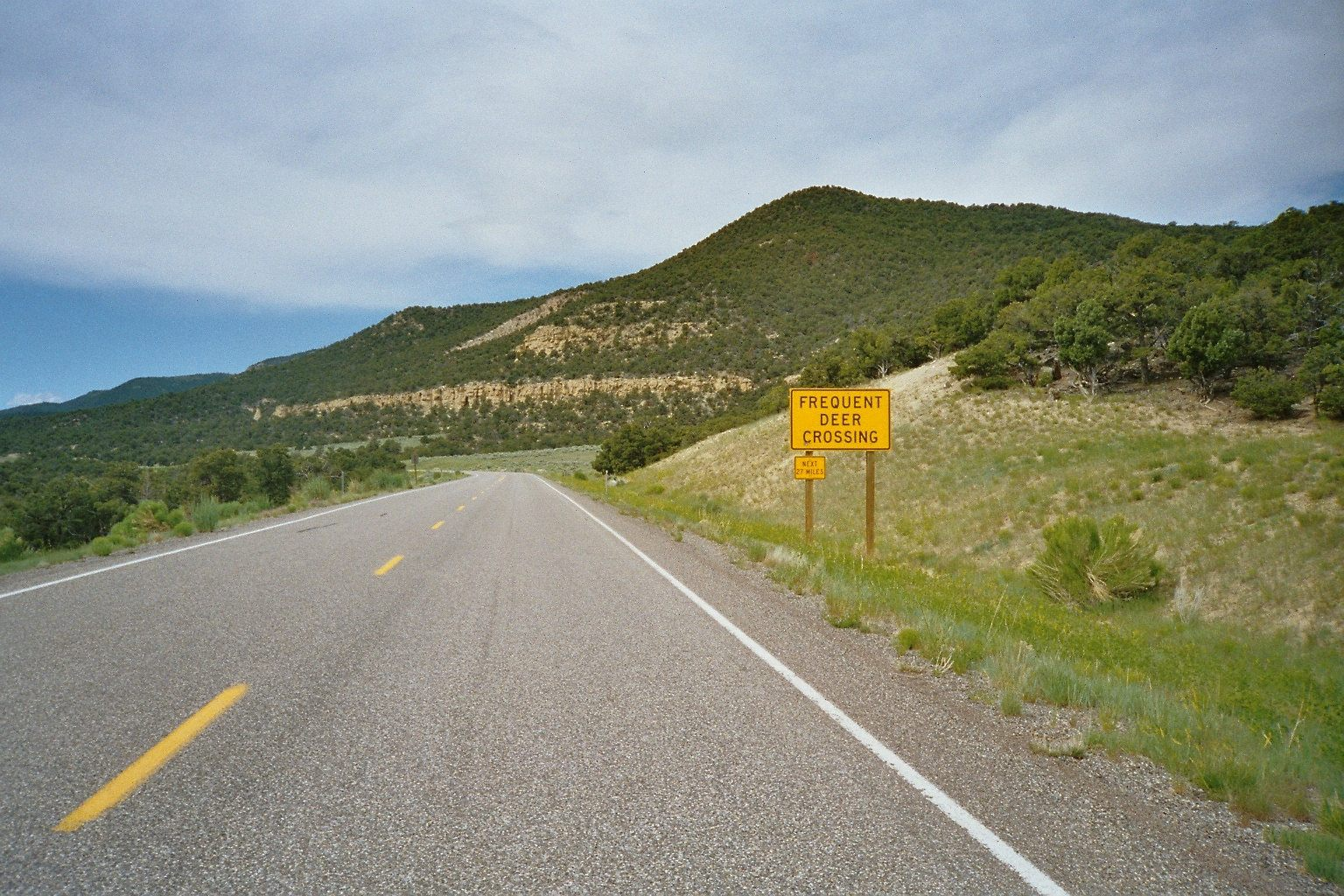
State Route 72 inside Fishlake National Forest

The highway begins in Loa and proceeds north towards Fremont and across Fishlake National Forest. The portion across Fishlake National Forest is frequently closed during winter weather. While in the national forest the highway passes by landmarks such as Foy Bench and The Frying Pan. The highway ends where SR-10 begins. This is near the Ivie Creek Rest Area along I-70. This junction is called Fremont Junction by most maps and the Utah legislature. Aside from the rest area, no permanent structures exist at this location.

== History ==
State Route 121 was created in 1931, connecting SR-24 at Loa with Fremont. Two years later, the route was renumbered 72 and extended to Fremont Junction on SR-10. State Route 250 was created in 1953 as a connection from SR-24 between Loa and Lyman north to the 90° turn in SR-72, but was given back to the county in 1969.

With the completion of I-70 along SR-10's alignment, most of the old road was relinquished to Sevier County in 1976. Since there was no interchange at Fremont Junction, SR-72 was extended east about two miles (3 km) to the point where I-70 left the SR-10 alignment to cross the San Rafael Swell. (A short piece of old SR-10 west of SR-72 was restored to the state highway system in 1978 as SR-76.)

== Major intersections ==
County	Location	mi	km	Destinations	Notes
Wayne	Loa	0.000	0.000	SR-24 – Richfield, Torrey	Southern terminus
Wayne	Fishlake National Forest	9.629	15.496	Fish Lake	
Sevier	Fishlake National Forest	17.400	28.003	View area – Hogan's Pass / Willow Basin	
Sevier	Fishlake National Forest	18.513	29.794	View Area – Hogan's Pass Trailhead	
Sevier		33.541	53.979	SR-76 west – Salina	Eastern terminus of SR-76
Sevier		35.393	56.960	I-70 / US 50 / SR-10 north – Salina, Denver	Northern terminus; southern terminus of SR-10; diamond interchange
1.000 mi = 1.609 km; 1.000 km = 0.621 mi
