= Orange Seely =

American politician

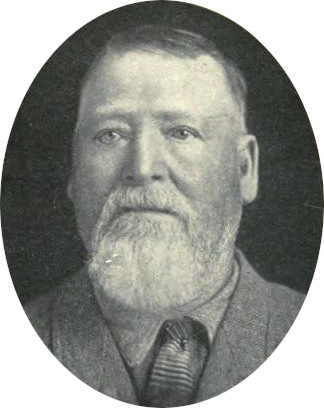
- Born: February 20, 1843; Nashville, Iowa
- Died: November 13, 1918 (aged 75); Castle Dale, Utah
- Known for: Bishop, Member of Utah territorial legislature
- Spouse: Hannah Olsen

Orange Seely (February 20, 1843 – November 13, 1918) was a Mormon pioneer and early settler of Utah. He is best known as the settler of the towns of Castle Dale and Orangeville, Utah.

Seely was born in Nashville, Lee County, Iowa. At age eight he was baptized into the Church of Jesus Christ of Latter-day Saints (LDS Church) and in 1847 emigrated to the Salt Lake Valley with the early Mormon pioneers. He married Hannah Olsen on July 24, 1863, in Mt. Pleasant, Utah Territory. In 1877, Seely was assigned by Brigham Young to set up the first encampments in Castle Valley and was made bishop in the LDS Church in Mt. Pleasant. He later served as bishop in the wards at Castle Dale, Ferron and Huntington. From 1880 to 1889, he was the first counselor in the presidency of the Emery Stake.

In October 1875, scarcity of feed for their livestock sent Seely and a company of men from Sanpete County with a herd of United Order stock eastward through Cottonwood Canyon to the Castle Dale/Orangeville area. The herd numbered 1500 head of sheep and about 1400 head of horned stock. The journey of forty miles took fourteen days. Upon their arrival at Cottonwood Creek, the men constructed a dugout twenty by thirty feet which they used as headquarters through the winter of 1875–76. Seely also served as a member of the Utah Territorial Assembly in the session of 1894.

Seely attempted to get the incoming settlers to stay on one side of the creek or the other, but they failed to heed him. Ultimately, two settlements about four miles apart developed, one on the northwest side of the creek, the other on the southeast, and the settlers decided that each should have a name. A real misunderstanding arose. "Some contended that the lower town, now Castle Dale, should have been Orangeville because it was the home of Bishop Orange Seely, in whose honor the name was suggested by Erastus Snow, and Orangeville should have retained the original name of Castle Dale because the settlers first located there. A friendly rivalry soon sprang up. Orangeville people were dubbed 'Skillet Lickers,' because molasses was made there, while the Castle Dale people were called 'Woodenshoes' implying that Danes had settled there."
