= Wilberg Mine =

Coal mine in Emery County, Utah, United States

The Wilberg Mine (also known as the Cottonwood/Wilberg Mine; MSHA ID No. 42-00080) is a coal mine in Emery County, Utah, approximately 12 miles (19 km) northwest of Orangeville, just north of State Route 29, at the northern terminus of State Route 57. The mine is operated by the Energy West Mining Company (out of Huntington) and owned by PacifiCorp Energy (a division of power utility company PacifiCorp).

Most of the coal is shipped by truck to Hunter Power Plant, a coal-fired power plant owned by PacifiCorp's Rocky Mountain Power division, just south of the town of Castle Dale.

== Location ==
The Wilberg Mine is located at 39°19′16″N 111°07′23″W (39.321078°, −111.122948°) with its entrance at an elevation of 7,602 feet (2,317 m).

== History ==
The mine was started by Cyrus Wilberg in September 1949. In October 1968, the mining rights were bought by Peabody Coal Company, who idled the mine except for limited exploratory mining until March 1974, when energy prices saw a sharp rise. Utah Power & Light (UP&L) (now operated as Rocky Mountain Power a division of PacifiCorp) purchased the rights to the mine on April 18, 1977, and then contracted out operating the mine to American Coal Company. In June 1979 Emery Mining Corporation (EMC) took over operations.

In December 1984 the mine employed 326 miners, and 290 of those were working underground on three shifts-a-day, five days a week. Production averaged 11,000 tons of coal per day.

After the fire, in 1985, the mine was divided into two separate mines. The mine workings on the west side of the fire seals became the Cottonwood Mine (MSHA ID No. 42-01944).

UP&L took over operating the mine, forming UP&L Mining Division, on April 29, 1986, retaining most of the EMC employees.

Composer and conductor Mack Wilberg is the son of a former part-owner of the mine.

== 1984 disaster ==
The Wilberg Mine is most notable for the fire on 19 December 1984, which claimed 27 lives: 18 miners and 9 company officials. The disaster was the worst coal mine fire in Utah history. The escape route of the 27 persons was cut off when the fire quickly engulfed the intake of the 5th Right longwall.

The fire was caused by a faulty air compressor, which was allowed to run unattended in an area that was not fire-proofed. In his article, "Remembering Wilberg, the lives lost, the humanity found" in The Salt Lake Tribune, Mike Gorrell says: "Mine Safety and Health Administration (MSHA) investigators determined an air compressor with two defective safety devices was turned on accidentally and left running unattended for 69 hours before self-combusting, its flames filling mine tunnels with poisonous gases."

=== Casualties ===
List of Emery Mining Corporation (EMC) employees who were killed at the Wilberg Mine:

- Phillip Bell
- Bert Bennett
- James Bertuzzi
- David Bocook – (Mine Manager)
- Ricci Camberlango
- Curtis Carter
- Robert Christensen
- Vic Cingolani – (General Mine Foreman)
- Gordon Conover
- Randy Curry
- Owen Curtis
- Roger Glenn Ellis
- James Hamlin – (EMC Vice President of Operations)
- Leroy Hersh
- Brian Howard
- Barry Jacobs
- Gary Jennings
- Lee Johansen
- Joel Nevitt
- Alex Poulos – (General Mine Foreman-Longwall)
- Kelly Riddle
- Ray Snow
- Lynn Robinson
- John Waldoch
- Lester Walls, Jr.
- Nanette Wheeler
- John Wilsey
