= Dave Lauriski =

American government official

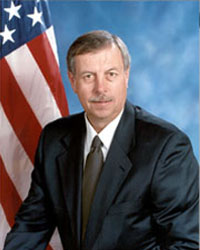
Dave D. Lauriski

Dave D. Lauriski was the United States Assistant Secretary of Labor for Mine Safety and Health, the head of the Mine Safety and Health Administration. He was appointed by President George W. Bush in 2001 and he resigned in November 2004.

Before he joined government, Lauriski ran his own consulting firm in Price, Utah. He was previously General Manager of Energy West Mining Company, and earlier, Director of Health, Safety, Environmental and Government Affairs for Interwest Mining Company.
