= United States Post Office-Price Main =

- U.S. Post Office-Price Main
- U.S. National Register of Historic Places
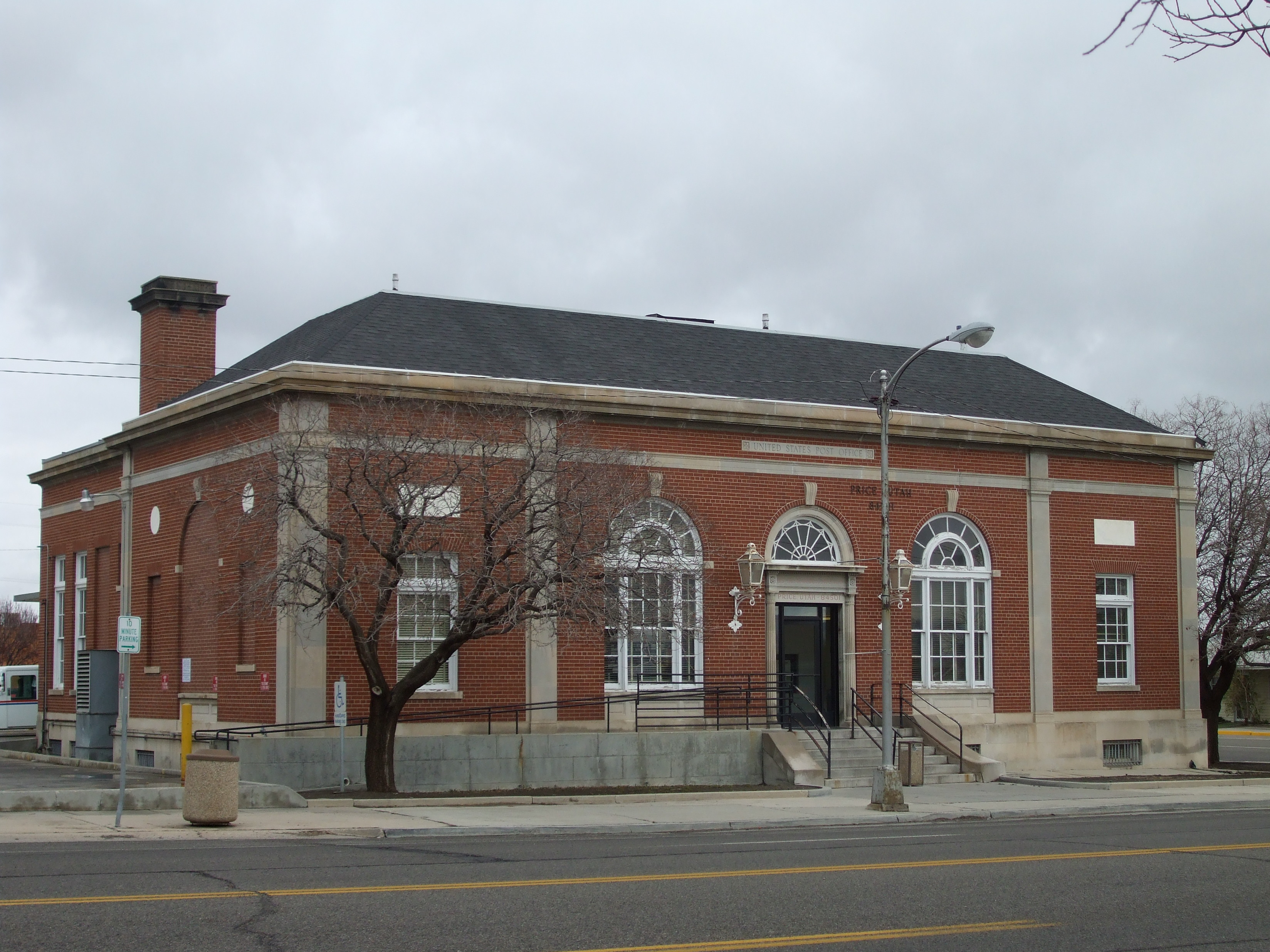

- Location within Utah Location within the United States
- Location: 95 S. Carbon Ave., Price, Utah
- Coordinates: 39°35′54″N 110°48′37″W
- Area: 0.5 acres (0.20 ha)
- Built: 1931
- Architect: Simon, Louis A.
- Architectural style: Classical Revival
- MPS: US Post Offices in Utah MPS
- NRHP reference No.: 89001998
- Added to NRHP: November 27, 1989

The U.S. Post Office-Price Main, at 95 S. Carbon Ave. in Price, Utah, was built in 1931. It was listed on the National Register of Historic Places in 1989.
