= Clear Creek (Utah) =

Creek in Utah, United States

Coordinates: 38°34′53″N 112°15′23″W

Clear Creek is a creek in Utah which joins the Sevier River near the city of Sevier. It flows alongside Interstate 70 just east of where I-70 meets I-15.

It is best known for its Fremont culture Native American archaeological finds and Fremont Indian State Park, which celebrates these finds.

== See also ==
- List of rivers of Utah
