= Austin, Utah =

Unincorporated community in the state of Utah, United States

- Unincorporated community
- Location within Utah Location within the United States
- Coordinates: 38°40′20″N 112°07′18″W
- Country: United States
- State: Utah
- County: Sevier
- Elevation: 5,308 ft (1,618 m)
- Time zone: UTC-7 (Mountain (MST))
  - Summer (DST): UTC-6 (MDT)
- Area code: 435
- GNIS feature ID: 1450235

Austin is an unincorporated community in Sevier County, Utah, United States. The community is on Utah State Route 118 1.6 miles (2.6 km) southeast of Elsinore.
