= Wattis, Utah =

- Unincorporated community
- Location within Utah Location within the United States
- Coordinates: 39°31′48″N 111°1′1″W
- Country: United States
- State: Utah
- County: Carbon
- Elevation: 5,919 ft (1,804 m)
- Time zone: UTC-7 (Mountain (MST))
  - Summer (DST): UTC-6 (MDT)
- GNIS feature ID: 1447080

Wattis is a ghost town in Carbon County, Utah, United States.

== History ==
The first settlement in the area was established around 1914 by a pioneer named Charlie Petitti, who lived in rustic conditions in the mountains.

In 1915 and 1916, the Wattis brothers, businessmen from Ogden, purchased 160 acres from the federal government and founded the Wattis Coal Company. The coal mine shipped its first load on April 11, 1918.

A post office operated from 1917 to 1964.

== See also ==
- List of ghost towns in Utah
