= Orangeville, Utah =

City in Utah, United States

- City
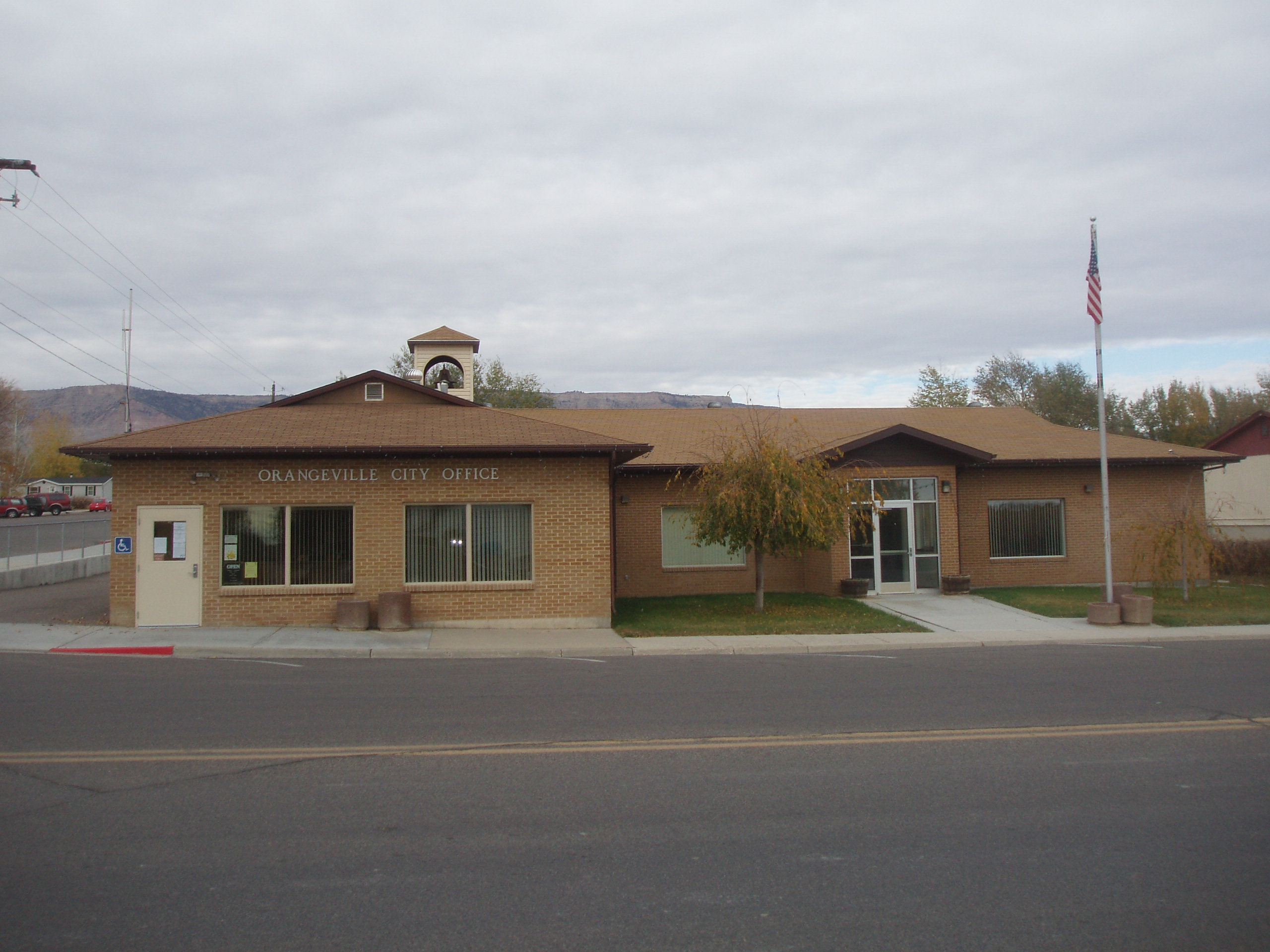
- Orangeville City Office

- Location in Emery County and the state of Utah

- Location of Utah in the United States
- Coordinates: 39°13′37″N 111°3′22″W
- Country: United States
- State: Utah
- County: Emery
- Founded: 1878
- Incorporated: June 6, 1901
- Became a city: March 1921
- Named for: Orange Seely

Area
  - Total: 1.42 sq mi (3.69 km^{2})
  - Land: 1.42 sq mi (3.69 km^{2})
  - Water: 0 sq mi (0.00 km^{2})
- Elevation: 5,778 ft (1,761 m)

Population (2020)
  - Total: 1,224
  - Density: 929.9/sq mi (359.05/km^{2})
- Time zone: UTC-7 (Mountain (MST))
  - Summer (DST): UTC-6 (MDT)
- ZIP code: 84537
- Area code: 435
- FIPS code: 49-56860
- GNIS feature ID: 1431021
- Website: www.orangevillecity.gov

Orangeville is a city in northwestern Emery County, Utah, United States, at the edge of the Manti-La Sal National Forest. The city is at the junction of State Routes 29 and 57, straddling the banks of Cottonwood Creek. The population was 1,224 at the 2020 census.

== Geography ==
Orangeville is 2 miles (3 km) west of Castle Dale, the Emery County seat. According to the United States Census Bureau, the city has a total area of 1.4 square miles (3.5 km^{2}), all land.

== Demographics ==
Historical population
Census	Pop.	Note	%±
1890	353		—
1900	623		76.5%
1910	643		3.2%
1920	553		−14.0%
1930	532		−3.8%
1940	652		22.6%
1950	589		−9.7%
1960	571		−3.1%
1970	511		−10.5%
1980	1,309		156.2%
1990	1,459		11.5%
2000	1,398		−4.2%
2010	1,470		5.2%
2020	1,224		−16.7%
U.S. Decennial Census

=== 2020 census ===
As of the 2020 census, Orangeville had a population of 1,224. The median age was 37.4 years. 28.8% of residents were under the age of 18 and 17.2% of residents were 65 years of age or older. For every 100 females there were 104.7 males, and for every 100 females age 18 and over there were 102.3 males age 18 and over.

0.0% of residents lived in urban areas, while 100.0% lived in rural areas.

There were 427 households in Orangeville, of which 36.3% had children under the age of 18 living in them. Of all households, 67.9% were married-couple households, 12.9% were households with a male householder and no spouse or partner present, and 15.0% were households with a female householder and no spouse or partner present. About 16.2% of all households were made up of individuals and 8.5% had someone living alone who was 65 years of age or older.

There were 476 housing units, of which 10.3% were vacant. The homeowner vacancy rate was 0.8% and the rental vacancy rate was 17.7%.

Racial composition as of the 2020 census
Race	Number	Percent
White	1,157	94.5%
Black or African American	2	0.2%
American Indian and Alaska Native	7	0.6%
Asian	6	0.5%
Native Hawaiian and Other Pacific Islander	0	0.0%
Some other race	10	0.8%
Two or more races	42	3.4%
Hispanic or Latino (of any race)	37	3.0%

=== 2000 census ===
At the 2000 census, there were 1,398 people, 430 households and 350 families residing in the city. The population density was 1,073.5 per square mile (414.5/km^{2}). There were 471 housing units at an average density of 361.7 per square mile (139.7/km^{2}). The racial make-up of the city was 98.43% White, 0.07% African American, 0.43% Native American, 0.14% Asian, 0.50% from other races and 0.43% from two or more races. Hispanic or Latino of any race were 1.22% of the population.

There were 430 households, of which 51.4% had children under the age of 18 living with them, 73.7% were married couples living together, 4.7% had a female householder with no husband present and 18.4% were non-families. 16.7% of all households were made up of individuals and 6.0% had someone living alone who was 65 years of age or older. The average household size was 3.25 and the average family size was 3.68.

38.4% of the population were under the age of 18, 8.6% from 18 to 24, 25.9% from 25 to 44, 19.2% from 45 to 64 and 7.9% were 65 years of age or older. The median age was 29 years. For every 100 females, there were 97.2 males. For every 100 females age 18 and over, there were 95.7 males.

The median household income was $45,057 and the median family income was $48,942. Males had a median income of $43,382 and females $21,667. The per capita income was $15,160. About 4.2% of families and 7.0% of the population were below the poverty line, including 7.8% of those under age 18 and 3.5% of those age 65 or over.

== History ==
Orangeville was founded in 1878 and was originally known as Upper Castle Dale. In 1879, when a post office was established, it was named Orangeville after Orange Seely, the first man called to settle Castle Valley.

=== Naming the town ===
Seely attempted to have the incoming settlers to stay on one side of the creek or the other, but they failed to heed him. Ultimately, two settlements about four miles apart developed, one on the northwest side of the creek, the other on the southeast, and the settlers decided that each should have a name. A real misunderstanding arose. "Some contended that the lower town, now Castle Dale, should have been Orangeville because it was the home of Bishop Orange Seely, in whose honor the name was suggested by Erastus Snow, and Orangeville should have retained the original name of Castle Dale because the settlers first located there. A friendly rivalry soon sprang up. Orangeville people were dubbed 'Skillet Lickers,' because molasses was made there, while the Castle Dale people were called 'Woodenshoes' implying that Danes had settled there."

=== Mine disaster ===
The Wilberg Mine, located 12 miles (19 km) northwest of town, was the site of a mine fire on 19 December 1984 which claimed 27 lives: 18 miners and nine company officials. The disaster was the worst coal mine fire in Utah history. The escape route of the 27 persons was cut off when the fire quickly engulfed the intake of the 5th Right longwall. The fire was caused by a faulty air compressor, which was allowed to run unattended in an area that was not fire-proofed.
