= Fremont Indian State Park and Museum =

State park in Utah, United States

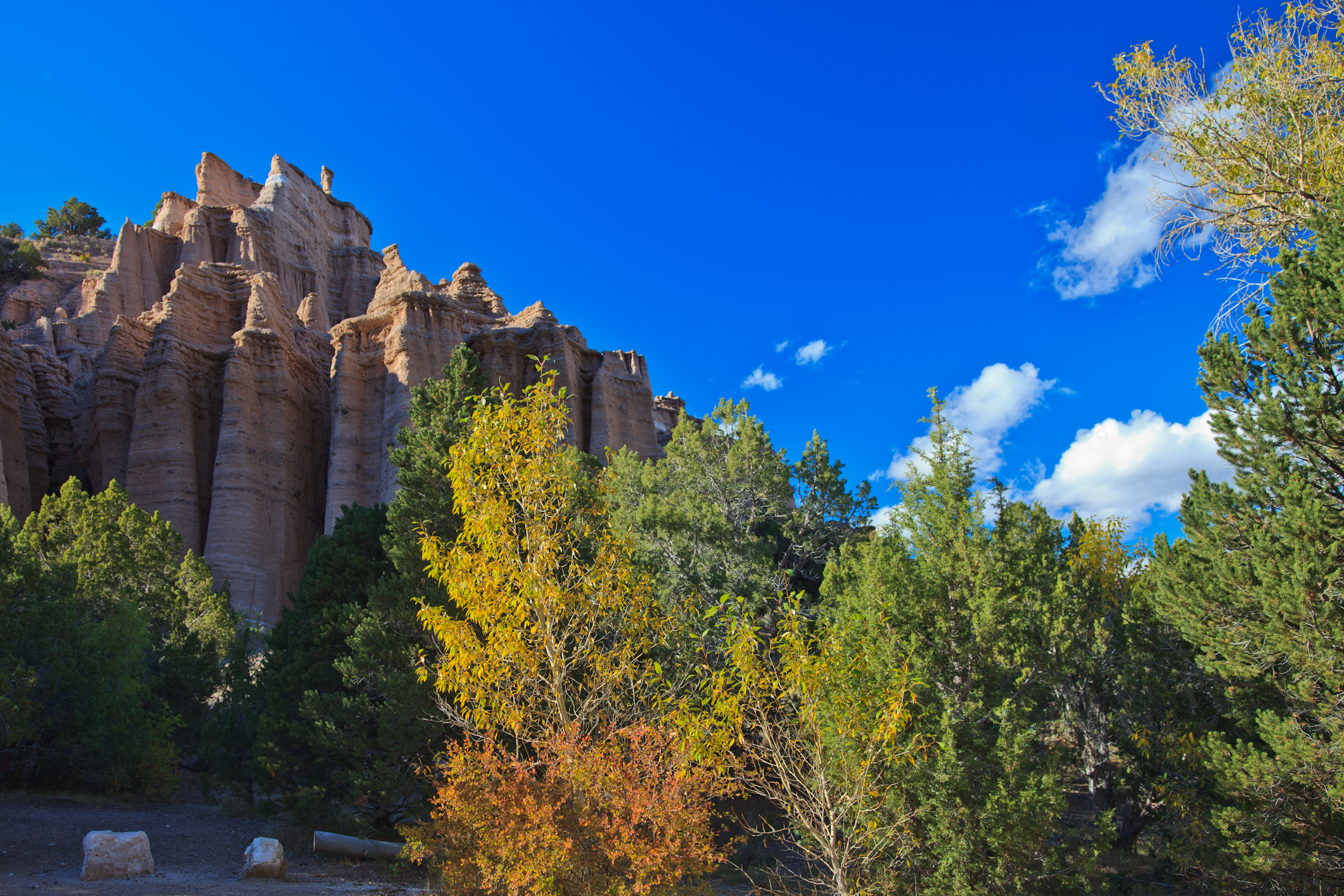
- Hoodoos at Fremont Indian State Park

- Location within Utah Location within the United States
- Interactive map of Fremont Indian State Park and Museum
- Location: Sevier County, Utah, United States
- Coordinates: 38°34′39″N 112°20′06″W
- Area: 889 acres (360 ha)
- Elevation: 5,900 ft (1,800 m)
- Opened: 1987
- Operator: Utah State Parks
- Visitors: 39,893 (in 2025)
- Website: Official website
- Utah State Parks

Fremont Indian State Park and Museum is a state park in Utah, US, which interprets archaeological remains of the Fremont culture. The park is located in Sevier County, Utah in the Clear Creek Canyon.

The park directly adjoins Interstate 70 as it travels up the Clear Creek Canyon, and thus is highly accessible by auto. The nearest town with full services (motels, etc.) is Richfield. There are campgrounds and RV parks in the area as well.

The site was discovered during the construction of Interstate 70, and thousands of artifacts have been excavated from the ancient village and put on permanent display at the museum there . The museum offers hiking trails and picnic areas.

The Fremont Indians were agriculturalists who lived from about 400 to 1300 in north and central Utah and adjacent parts of Colorado, Idaho, and Nevada. The Fremont are thought to have come from hunter-gatherers who previously lived in this location and were influenced by the Ancestral Puebloans who introduced corn and pottery, making year-round settlements possible.

== Climate ==
Fremont Indian State Park has a borderline semi-arid and humid continental climate (Köppen BSk/Dfb), characterized by cold winters, warm-to-hot summers, and high diurnal temperature variation throughout the year.

Climate data for Fremont Indian State Park and Museum, Utah, 1991–2020 normals, extremes 1988–present
Month	Jan	Feb	Mar	Apr	May	Jun	Jul	Aug	Sep	Oct	Nov	Dec	Year
Record high °F (°C)	67 (19)	80 (27)	82 (28)	89 (32)	101 (38)	103 (39)	107 (42)	103 (39)	99 (37)	89 (32)	79 (26)	69 (21)	107 (42)
Mean maximum °F (°C)	58.2 (14.6)	62.8 (17.1)	71.5 (21.9)	78.3 (25.7)	86.8 (30.4)	95.3 (35.2)	99.1 (37.3)	96.6 (35.9)	91.4 (33.0)	82.2 (27.9)	70.2 (21.2)	59.7 (15.4)	99.6 (37.6)
Mean daily maximum °F (°C)	42.3 (5.7)	46.3 (7.9)	54.9 (12.7)	61.0 (16.1)	70.9 (21.6)	82.7 (28.2)	89.6 (32.0)	87.5 (30.8)	79.5 (26.4)	66.3 (19.1)	52.5 (11.4)	41.8 (5.4)	64.6 (18.1)
Daily mean °F (°C)	27.3 (−2.6)	31.3 (−0.4)	38.6 (3.7)	44.2 (6.8)	53.1 (11.7)	62.8 (17.1)	70.3 (21.3)	68.3 (20.2)	59.6 (15.3)	47.4 (8.6)	35.9 (2.2)	26.8 (−2.9)	47.1 (8.4)
Mean daily minimum °F (°C)	12.4 (−10.9)	16.2 (−8.8)	22.3 (−5.4)	27.4 (−2.6)	35.2 (1.8)	43.0 (6.1)	51.0 (10.6)	49.0 (9.4)	39.6 (4.2)	28.5 (−1.9)	19.3 (−7.1)	11.7 (−11.3)	29.6 (−1.3)
Mean minimum °F (°C)	−5.3 (−20.7)	−0.6 (−18.1)	8.4 (−13.1)	16.1 (−8.8)	23.5 (−4.7)	30.8 (−0.7)	41.1 (5.1)	40.7 (4.8)	27.6 (−2.4)	15.9 (−8.9)	2.3 (−16.5)	−6.2 (−21.2)	−10.0 (−23.3)
Record low °F (°C)	−18 (−28)	−29 (−34)	−6 (−21)	6 (−14)	15 (−9)	20 (−7)	34 (1)	30 (−1)	20 (−7)	−1 (−18)	−13 (−25)	−32 (−36)	−32 (−36)
Average precipitation inches (mm)	0.78 (20)	0.97 (25)	0.85 (22)	1.14 (29)	1.19 (30)	0.63 (16)	1.23 (31)	1.30 (33)	1.01 (26)	1.21 (31)	0.88 (22)	0.89 (23)	12.08 (307)
Average snowfall inches (cm)	11.5 (29)	7.9 (20)	5.2 (13)	4.1 (10)	0.3 (0.76)	0.0 (0.0)	0.0 (0.0)	0.0 (0.0)	0.0 (0.0)	1.0 (2.5)	5.4 (14)	9.4 (24)	44.8 (114)
Average precipitation days (≥ 0.01 in)	5.6	6.0	5.7	7.3	6.3	2.8	6.1	7.5	5.3	5.3	4.4	5.2	67.5
Average snowy days (≥ 0.1 in)	4.3	4.0	3.0	1.9	0.3	0.0	0.0	0.0	0.0	0.4	2.1	3.7	19.7
Source: NOAA
