= Elmo, Utah =

Town in Emery County, Utah, United States

- Town
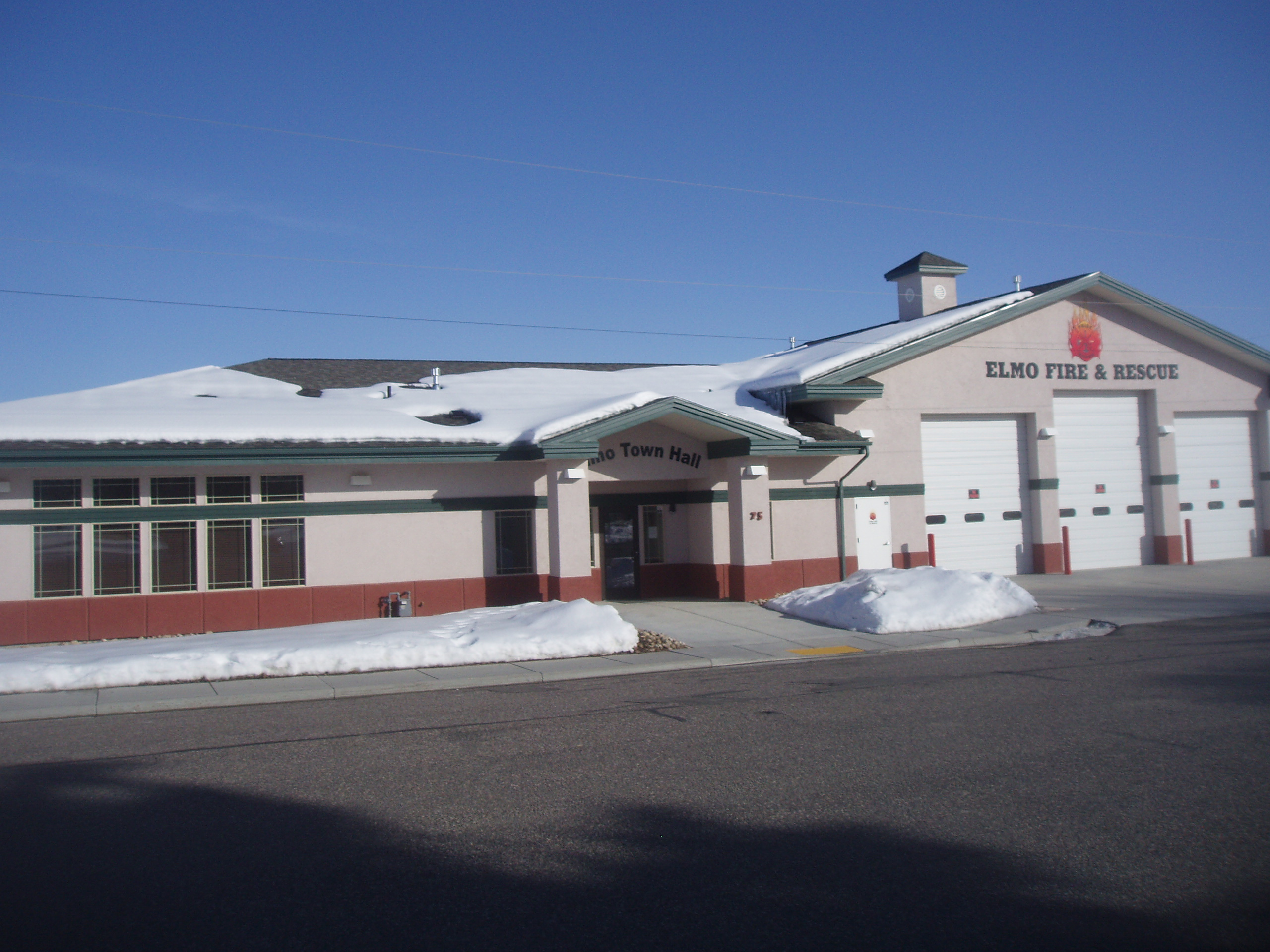
- Town hall and fire station, February 2010

- Location in Emery County and the state of Utah

- Location of Utah in the United States
- Coordinates: 39°23′26″N 110°48′58″W
- Country: United States
- State: Utah
- County: Emery
- Settled: 1908
- Incorporated: 1935

Area
  - Total: 0.71 sq mi (1.83 km^{2})
  - Land: 0.71 sq mi (1.83 km^{2})
  - Water: 0 sq mi (0.00 km^{2})
- Elevation: 5,692 ft (1,735 m)

Population (2020)
  - Total: 405
  - Density: 570.1/sq mi (220.12/km^{2})
- Time zone: UTC-7 (Mountain (MST))
  - Summer (DST): UTC-6 (MDT)
- ZIP code: 84521
- Area code: 435
- FIPS code: 49-22540
- GNIS feature ID: 1427806

Elmo is a town in Emery County, Utah, United States. The population was 405 at the 2020 census, down from 418 in 2010.

== Geography ==
Elmo is in northern Emery County, 11 miles (18 km) northeast of Huntington, and 16 miles (26 km) south of Price. According to the United States Census Bureau, the town has a total area of 0.66 square miles (1.7 km^{2}), all land.

== Demographics ==
Historical population
| Census | Pop. | Note | %± |
|---|---|---|---|
| 1920 | 260 | | — |
| 1930 | 305 | | 17.3% |
| 1940 | 198 | | −35.1% |
| 1950 | 170 | | −14.1% |
| 1960 | 175 | | 2.9% |
| 1970 | 141 | | −19.4% |
| 1980 | 300 | | 112.8% |
| 1990 | 267 | | −11.0% |
| 2000 | 368 | | 37.8% |
| 2010 | 418 | | 13.6% |
| 2020 | 405 | | −3.1% |
U.S. Decennial Census

As of the 2000 census, there were 368 people, 112 households, and 93 families residing in the town. The population density was 597.9 people per square mile (229.2/km^{2}). There were 120 housing units at an average density of 195.0 per square mile (74.7/km^{2}). The racial makeup of the town was 96.74% White, 0.27% African American, 0.54% Native American, 0.54% Pacific Islander, and 1.90% from two or more races. Hispanic or Latino of any race were 4.35% of the population.

There were 112 households, of which 42.9% had children under 18 living with them, 75.0% were married couples living together, 5.4% had a female householder with no husband present, and 16.1% were non-families. 16.1% of all households were made up of individuals, and 10.7% had someone living alone who was 65 years of age or older. The average household size was 3.11, and the average family size was 3.43.

In the town, the population was spread out, with 30.4% under 18, 11.1% from 18 to 24, 20.4% from 25 to 44, 20.9% from 45 to 64, and 17.1% who were 65 years of age or older. The median age was 35 years. For every 100 females, there were 96.8 males. For every 100 females aged 18 and over, there were 92.5 males.

The median income for a household in the town was $33,750, and the median income for a family was $41,250. Males had a median income of $45,000 versus $18,333 for females. The per capita income was $12,861. About 9.1% of families and 11.2% of the population were below the poverty line, including 19.6% of those under age 18 and 1.9% of those aged 65 or over.

== See also ==
- List of municipalities in Utah
