= Hiawatha, Utah =

- Unincorporated Community
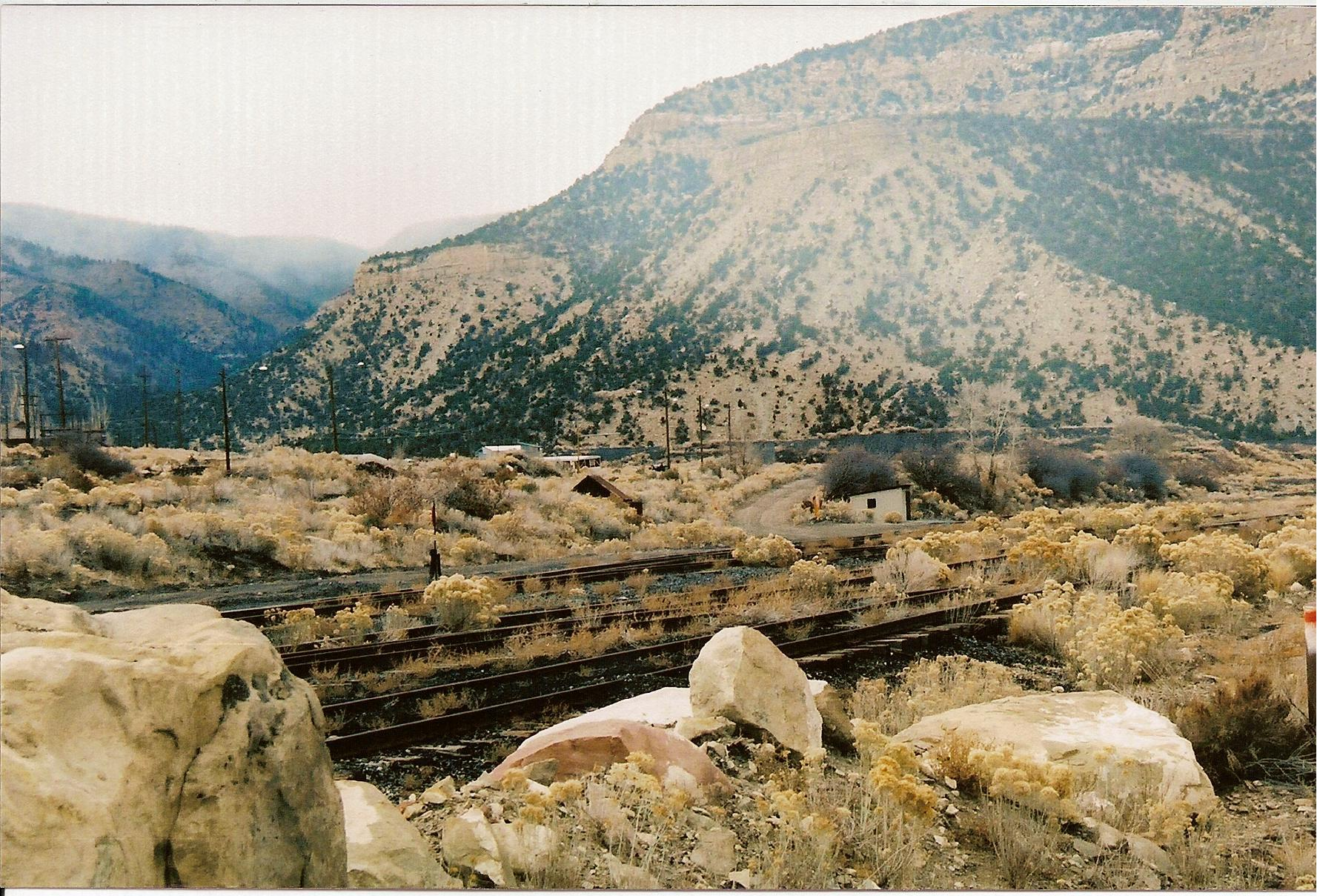
- A few of the structures left at Hiawatha, November 2007

- Location within Utah Location within the United States
- Coordinates: 39°29′3.61″N 111°00′47.05″W
- Country: United States
- State: Utah
- County: Carbon
- Incorporated: 1911
- Disincorporated: November 20, 1992
- Named for: Hiawatha, a pre-colonial Native American leader
- Elevation: 7,264 ft (2,214 m)
- GNIS feature ID: 1428681

Hiawatha is an unincorporated community and near-ghost town, formerly a coal mining town in southwestern Carbon County, Utah, United States. While the town's former corporate limits were almost entirely within Carbon County, the western part was within the Manti-La Sal National Forest and a very small part extended west into Emery County.

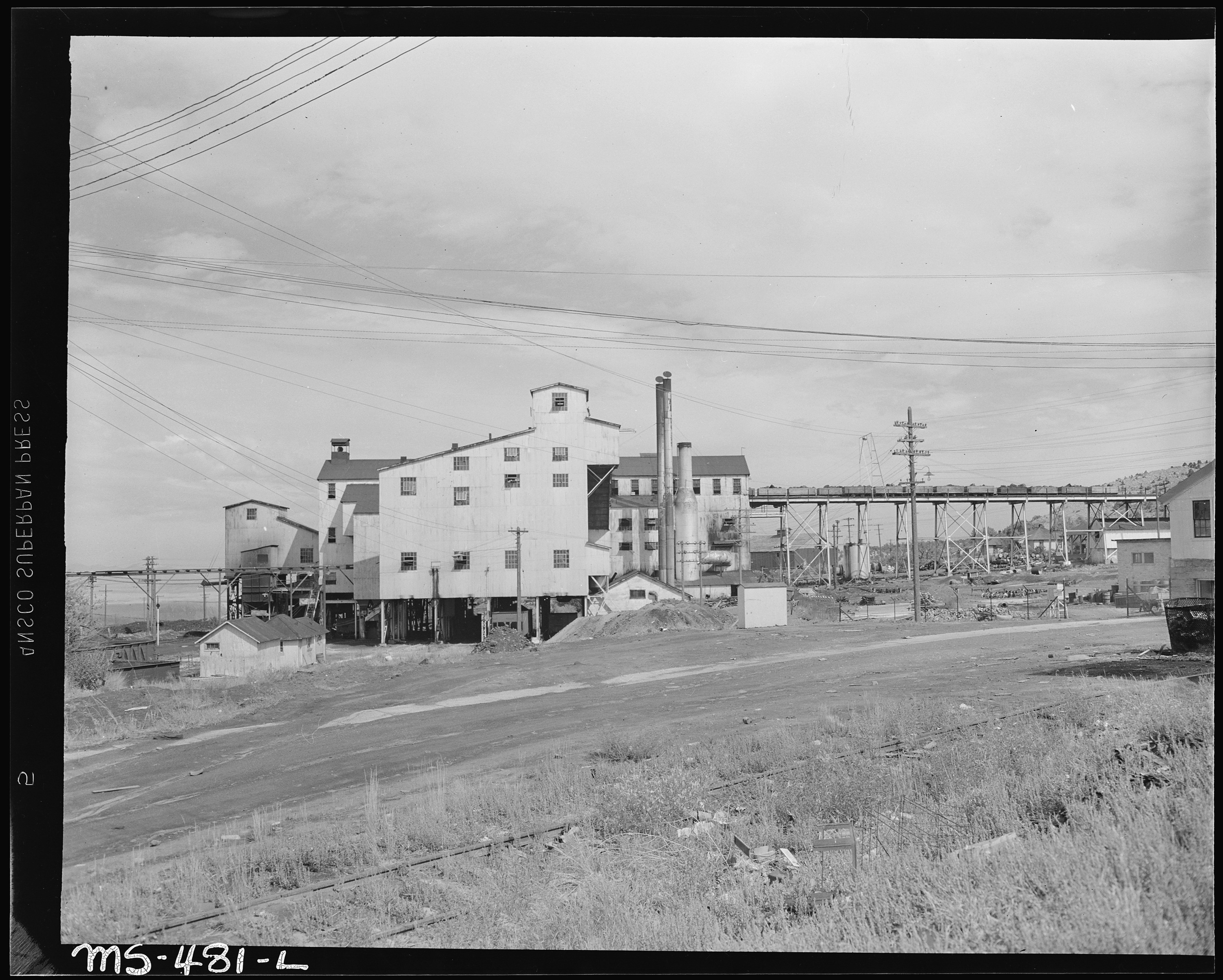
View of the tipple. United States Fuel Company, King Mine, July 1946

== Description ==
Historical population
Census	Pop.	Note	%±
1920	1,436		—
1930	939		−34.6%
1940	858		−8.6%
1950	1,421		65.6%
1960	439		−69.1%
1970	166		−62.2%
1980	249		50.0%
1990	43		−82.7%

The town is located at the base of Gentry Mountain, some 12 miles (19 km) southwest of Price. It used to be a vibrant mining town, with a population of above 1,500 in the 1940s. Coal was discovered here in 1909, a mine was built, a railroad was constructed, and the city was incorporated in 1911. Another nearby village called Blackhawk was merged with Hiawatha in 1915.

Hiawatha was a company town. The United States Fuel Company, which owned the Hiawatha mine and had its headquarters there, essentially ran the town. After the 1940s, production began to drop and people moved away. The population fell from 439 in 1960, to 43 in 1990. The city was disincorporated on November 20, 1992.

On December 12, 1997, the permit for the Hiawatha Mines Complex was transferred from U.S. Fuel Company to Hiawatha Coal Company. The company plans to recommence mining in the near future. In September 2006, the Carbon County commission approved the rezoning of three of Hiawatha's six sections as residential, at the request of the property owner ANR Inc. It is estimated that around three or four families currently live in Hiawatha. Some homes have been remodeled, and further construction is ongoing.

Hiawatha was also notable for having a vibrant Greek immigrant community, particularly from the island of Crete.

== Climate ==
This climatic region is typified by large seasonal temperature differences, with warm to hot (and often humid) summers and cold (sometimes severely cold) winters. According to the Köppen Climate Classification system, Hiawatha has a humid continental climate, abbreviated "Dfb" on climate maps.

== See also ==
- List of ghost towns in Utah
- John E. Moss, a politician born in Hiawatha
