= Hunter Power Plant =

Coal-fired power plant in the United States

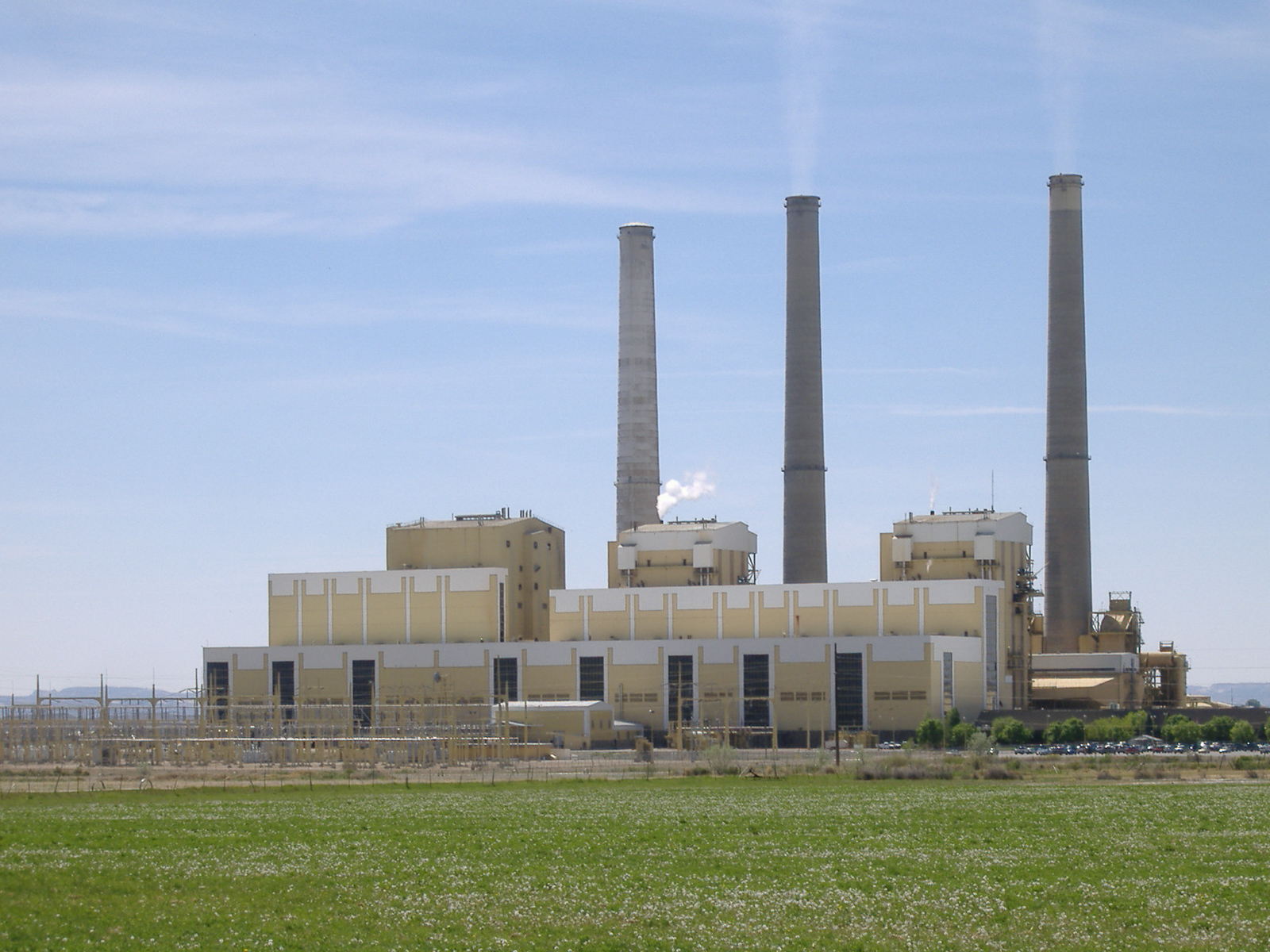
- Country: United States
- Coordinates: 39°10′29″N 111°01′44″W

Power generation
- Nameplate capacity: 1,577.2 MW

Hunter Power Plant is a coal-fired power plant in Utah. Environmentalists say its ash is hazardous, and oppose it but Utah lawmakers support the plant. It is now operated as a peaking power plant.
