= Price, Utah =

City in Utah, United States

- City
- Location in Carbon County and the state of Utah

- Location of Utah in the United States
- Coordinates: 39°36′14″N 110°48′01″W
- Country: United States
- State: Utah
- County: Carbon
- Settled: 1879
- Founder: Caleb Baldwin Rhoades
- Named for: Bishop William Price

Area
  - Total: 5.03 sq mi (13.04 km^{2})
  - Land: 5.03 sq mi (13.04 km^{2})
  - Water: 0 sq mi (0.00 km^{2})
- Elevation: 5,627 ft (1,715 m)

Population (2020)
  - Total: 8,216
  - Density: 1,654.7/sq mi (638.88/km^{2})
- Time zone: UTC-7 (Mountain (MST))
  - Summer (DST): UTC-6 (MDT)
- ZIP code: 84501
- Area code: 435
- FIPS code: 49-62030
- GNIS feature ID: 2411491
- Website: www.priceutah.gov

Price is a city in the U.S. state of Utah and the county seat of Carbon County.

The population of Price, Utah was 8,216 at the time of the 2020 United States Census, making it the largest city in Carbon County.

The city is home to Utah State University Eastern, as well as the USU Eastern Prehistoric Museum. Price is located within short distances of both Nine Mile Canyon and the Manti-La Sal National Forest.

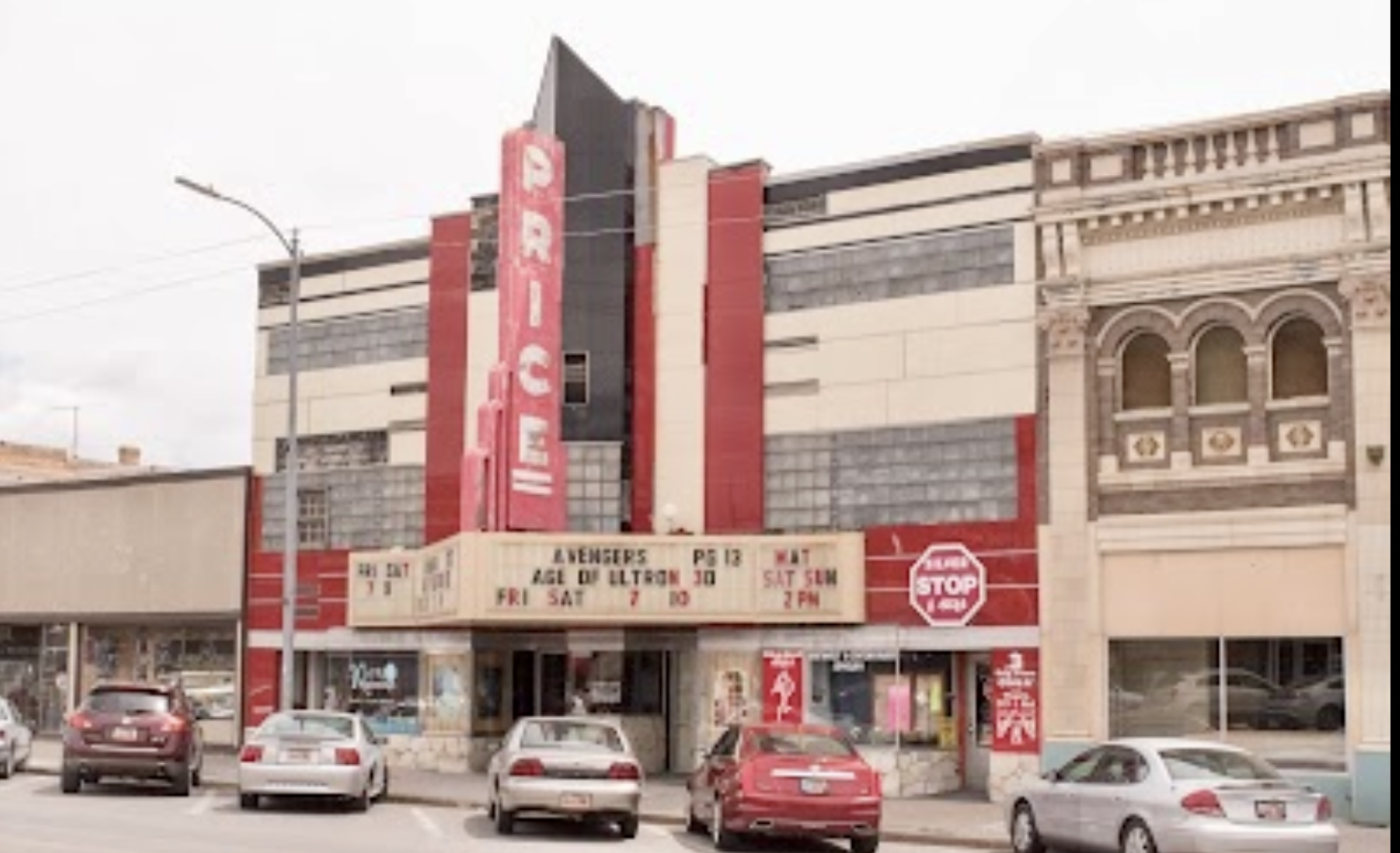
Price, Utah Main Street and historic theater

== History ==
Modern settlement began in the mid and late 1800s with the arrival of Latter-day Saints in the region. In 1877, fur trappers built a cabin in what is now Price and a small number of families soon followed and began farming.

The area experienced major population growth, from hundreds of residents to several thousand, following the 1883 completion of a railroad by the Denver and Rio Grande to service coal mines. With the development of coal mining as a key industry in the region, the Price area became one of the most culturally diverse areas in Utah as people from a wide range of nationalities came to work in the mines. A substantial irrigation canal was completed in 1888, allowing for large-scale farming. Members of the U.S. Army 9th Cavalry Regiment completed the construction of a road and telegraph lines through nearby Ninemile Canyon in 1886, linking Price and the surrounding region to the Uintah Basin and Fort Duchesne.

The city was formally incorporated July 14, 1892 (originally as part of Emery County) and is named after the Price River, itself named after early settler William Price. The College of Eastern Utah was established in Price in 1937, later renamed Utah State University Eastern.

== Geography ==
Price is located in west-central Carbon County at the northwestern edge of the Colorado Plateau. According to the United States Census Bureau, the city has a total area of 5.1 square miles (13.1 km^{2}), all land. The Price River, a tributary of the Green River, flows southeasterly through the city, and the San Rafael Swell is to the south.

The city is on U.S. Route 6 and U.S. Route 191. US 6 leads 67 miles (108 km) northwest to Spanish Fork on the Interstate 15 corridor, while US 191 leads northeast 54 miles (87 km) to Duchesne. The two highways together run southeast 64 miles (103 km) to the city of Green River and Interstate 70. Utah State Route 10 leads southwest from Price 21 miles (34 km) to Huntington.

Price was one of the communities that was served by the Rio Grande Zephyr passenger train. Today Amtrak's California Zephyr passes once a day each direction with a station about seven miles away in Helper.

=== Climate ===
According to the Köppen Climate Classification system, Price has a cool semi-arid climate, abbreviated BSk on climate maps. It features cold winters and relatively moderate summers. The average high in January is 37 °F or 2.8 °C and it rises to 90 °F or 32.2 °C in July. The low in January averages 13 °F or −10.6 °C, and even in summer the dry climate keeps the nights cool, with an average of 58 °F or 14.4 °C. The all-time record high is 110 °F (43.3 °C), which was set on August 3, 1918, while the all-time low is −31 °F (−35 °C), set on December 26, 1924. Price lies in the rain shadow of central Utah's Wasatch Mountains so that precipitation averages only 9.13 inches or 231.9 millimetres annually. Late summer and early fall are the wettest times of year due to the Gulf of California monsoon that brings scattered thunderstorms to the region. The city also sees frequent snow during winter and early spring.

Climate data for Price, Utah (1968–2016)
Month	Jan	Feb	Mar	Apr	May	Jun	Jul	Aug	Sep	Oct	Nov	Dec	Year
Record high °F (°C)	62 (17)	68 (20)	75 (24)	84 (29)	91 (33)	101 (38)	107 (42)	100 (38)	95 (35)	86 (30)	69 (21)	59 (15)	107 (42)
Mean daily maximum °F (°C)	36.9 (2.7)	42.8 (6.0)	52.5 (11.4)	63.2 (17.3)	72.5 (22.5)	83.8 (28.8)	90.0 (32.2)	88.4 (31.3)	79.5 (26.4)	64.8 (18.2)	49.5 (9.7)	40.1 (4.5)	63.7 (17.6)
Daily mean °F (°C)	25.1 (−3.8)	31.2 (−0.4)	40.1 (4.5)	48.9 (9.4)	57.7 (14.3)	68.1 (20.1)	74.2 (23.4)	72.7 (22.6)	63.9 (17.7)	51.0 (10.6)	37.3 (2.9)	28.4 (−2.0)	49.9 (9.9)
Mean daily minimum °F (°C)	13.4 (−10.3)	19.7 (−6.8)	27.6 (−2.4)	34.6 (1.4)	42.9 (6.1)	52.1 (11.2)	58.3 (14.6)	57.0 (13.9)	48.1 (8.9)	37.5 (3.1)	25.7 (−3.5)	16.7 (−8.5)	36.1 (2.3)
Record low °F (°C)	−15 (−26)	−10 (−23)	4 (−16)	8 (−13)	21 (−6)	28 (−2)	38 (3)	34 (1)	24 (−4)	4 (−16)	4 (−16)	−15 (−26)	−15 (−26)
Average precipitation inches (mm)	0.75 (19)	0.70 (18)	0.66 (17)	0.48 (12)	0.64 (16)	0.60 (15)	0.81 (21)	0.99 (25)	1.10 (28)	1.30 (33)	0.54 (14)	0.59 (15)	9.16 (233)
Average snowfall inches (cm)	7.2 (18)	3.6 (9.1)	0.9 (2.3)	0.3 (0.76)	0.0 (0.0)	0.0 (0.0)	0.0 (0.0)	0.0 (0.0)	0.0 (0.0)	0.2 (0.51)	1.8 (4.6)	4.3 (11)	18.3 (46.27)
Average precipitation days (≥ 0.01 inch)	4	4	4	4	4	3	5	6	5	5	3	4	49

== Demographics ==
Historical population
Census	Pop.	Note	%±
1890	209		—
1900	539		157.9%
1910	1,021		89.4%
1920	2,777		172.0%
1930	4,084		47.1%
1940	5,214		27.7%
1950	6,010		15.3%
1960	6,802		13.2%
1970	6,218		−8.6%
1980	9,086		46.1%
1990	8,712		−4.1%
2000	8,402		−3.6%
2010	8,715		3.7%
2020	8,216		−5.7%
U.S. Decennial Census

=== 2020 census ===
As of the 2020 census, Price had a population of 8,216. The median age was 36.0 years. 26.1% of residents were under the age of 18 and 17.7% of residents were 65 years of age or older. For every 100 females there were 97.1 males, and for every 100 females age 18 and over there were 92.6 males age 18 and over.

100.0% of residents lived in urban areas, while 0.0% lived in rural areas.

There were 3,240 households in Price, of which 32.2% had children under the age of 18 living in them. Of all households, 43.9% were married-couple households, 19.7% were households with a male householder and no spouse or partner present, and 30.1% were households with a female householder and no spouse or partner present. About 32.2% of all households were made up of individuals and 16.1% had someone living alone who was 65 years of age or older.

There were 3,631 housing units, of which 10.8% were vacant. The homeowner vacancy rate was 1.9% and the rental vacancy rate was 11.4%.

Racial composition as of the 2020 census
Race	Number	Percent
White	7,029	85.6%
Black or African American	46	0.6%
American Indian and Alaska Native	156	1.9%
Asian	41	0.5%
Native Hawaiian and Other Pacific Islander	14	0.2%
Some other race	274	3.3%
Two or more races	656	8.0%
Hispanic or Latino (of any race)	1,168	14.2%

=== 2000 census ===
As of the 2000 census, there were 8,402 people, 3,045 households, and 2,085 families residing in the city. The population density was 1,979.7 people per square mile (764.4 people/km^{2}). There were 3,311 housing units at an average density of 780.2 units per square mile (301.2 units/km^{2}). The racial makeup of the city was 90.70% White, 0.26% African American, 1.37% Native American, 0.56% Asian, 0.04% Pacific Islander, 4.25% from other races, and 2.82% from two or more races. Hispanic or Latino of any race were 10.08% of the population.

There were 3,045 households, out of which 34.4% had children under the age of 18 living with them, 53.2% were married couples living together, 11.5% had a female householder with no husband present, and 31.5% were non-families. 27.4% of all households were made up of individuals, and 12.2% had someone living alone who was 65 years of age or older. The average household size was 2.60 and the average family size was 3.19.

In the city, the population was spread out, with 27.6% under the age of 18, 15.9% from 18 to 24, 22.5% from 25 to 44, 19.9% from 45 to 64, and 14.1% who were 65 years of age or older. The median age was 32 years. For every 100 females, there were 91.7 males. For every 100 females age 18 and over, there were 88.3 males.

The median income for a household in the city was $31,687, and the median income for a family was $39,429. Males had a median income of $37,476 versus $21,081 for females. The per capita income for the city was $14,313. About 11.4% of families and 15.0% of the population were below the poverty line, including 16.3% of those under age 18 and 11.1% of those age 65 or over.

=== 2015 ===
As of 2015 the largest self-reported ancestry groups in Price, Utah are:

Largest ancestries (2015)	Percent
English	25.9%
German	13.1%
Irish	7.7%
Danish	5.7%
Italian	5.6%
Swedish	5.2%
Scottish	3.6%
Polish	2.8%
Greek	2.3%
French (except Basque)	2.2%
Norwegian	2.0%
Welsh	1.9%
Dutch	1.4%
Swiss	1.2%

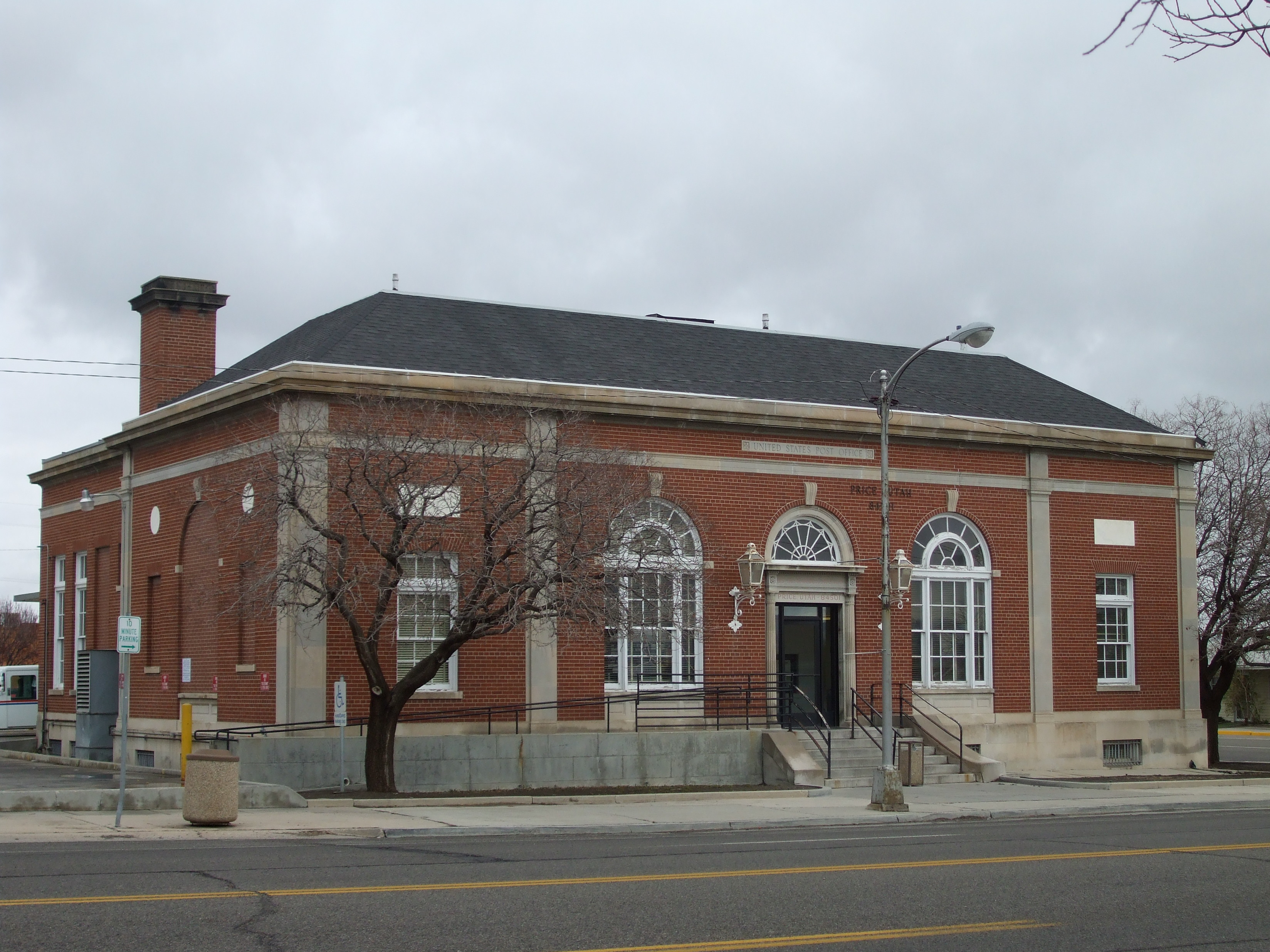
The post office in Price is one of 12 sites listed on the National Register of Historic Places.

== Education ==
There are two public elementary schools in Price (Creekview and Castle Heights); one middle school (Mont Harmon); one high school (Carbon High School). It is also the location of the charter Pinnacle Canyon Academy, which serves grades K-12, as well as the Castle Valley Center for disabled children. Some children located in the Gordon Creek area attend Sally Mauro Elementary in Helper.

Price is the location of Utah State University Eastern, which has an enrollment of approximately 1,525.

== Notable people ==
- Harold Arceneaux, professional basketball player
- Dean and Lynn Fausett, painters of the American West
- John D. Fitzgerald, author known for his The Great Brain series of books for children
- Herman Franks, former catcher, coach, manager, general manager and scout in Major League Baseball
- Dave Lauriski, head of the Mine Safety and Health Administration from 2001 to 2004
- J. Bracken Lee, mayor of Price from 1935 to 1947, governor of Utah from 1949 to 1957
- Cassandra Lynn, model, Playboy Playmate, born in Price
- Erik Pears, NFL offensive lineman
- Jean Westwood, first female chair of the Democratic National Committee; worked on several presidential campaigns
- Scott Woodward, molecular geneticist noted for his work with the discovery of the first genetic marker for cystic fibrosis

== See also ==
- List of cities and towns in Utah
- Cleveland-Lloyd Dinosaur Quarry
- Helper, Utah
- KCBU
- National Register of Historic Places listings in Carbon County, Utah
