= List of bridges on the National Register of Historic Places in Louisiana =

This is a list of bridges and tunnels on the National Register of Historic Places in the U.S. state of Louisiana.

Name	Image	Built	Listed	Location	Parish	Type
Burr's Ferry Bridge	Burrs Ferry Bridge	1936, 1937	1998-05-18	Burr Ferry; 31°3′50″N 93°31′24″W	Vernon	Parker through truss bridge
Caddo Lake Bridge		1914	1996-10-18	Mooringsport; 32°41′47″N 93°57′28″W	Caddo	vertical lift bridge
Deweyville-Starks Swing Bridge		1936-38	2011-06-08	Starks vicinity 30°18′14″N 93°44′37″W	Calcasieu	Part of Historic Bridges of Texas, 1866-1945 MPS.
Kansas City Southern Railroad Bridge, Cross Bayou	Kansas City Southern Railroad Bridge, Cross Bayou	ca. 1890, 1926	1995-03-23	Shreveport; 32°31′10″N 93°45′00″W	Caddo	Waddell "A" Truss Bridge
Levert-St. John Bridge		1895, 1900	1998-03-26	St. Martinville; 30°9′29″N 91°48′43″W	St. Martin	Warren through truss swing
Mississippi River Bridge	Mississippi River Bridge	1928–1930	1989-02-14	Delta; 32°18′54″N 90°54′20″W	Madison	Cantilevered truss span
Sarto Bridge		1916	1989-11-21	Big Bend; 31°04′26″N 91°47′33″W	Avoyelles	Swing truss bridge
Sparrow Lane Bridge		1919	2017-01-31	Colfax; 31°04′26″N 91°47′33″W	Grant	Concrete deck girder bridge
Vida Shaw Bridge	Vida Shaw Bridge	1940	2010-7-6	Loreaville vicinity	Iberia	
