= Rockville Bridge (Rockville, Utah) =

- U.S. National Register of Historic Places
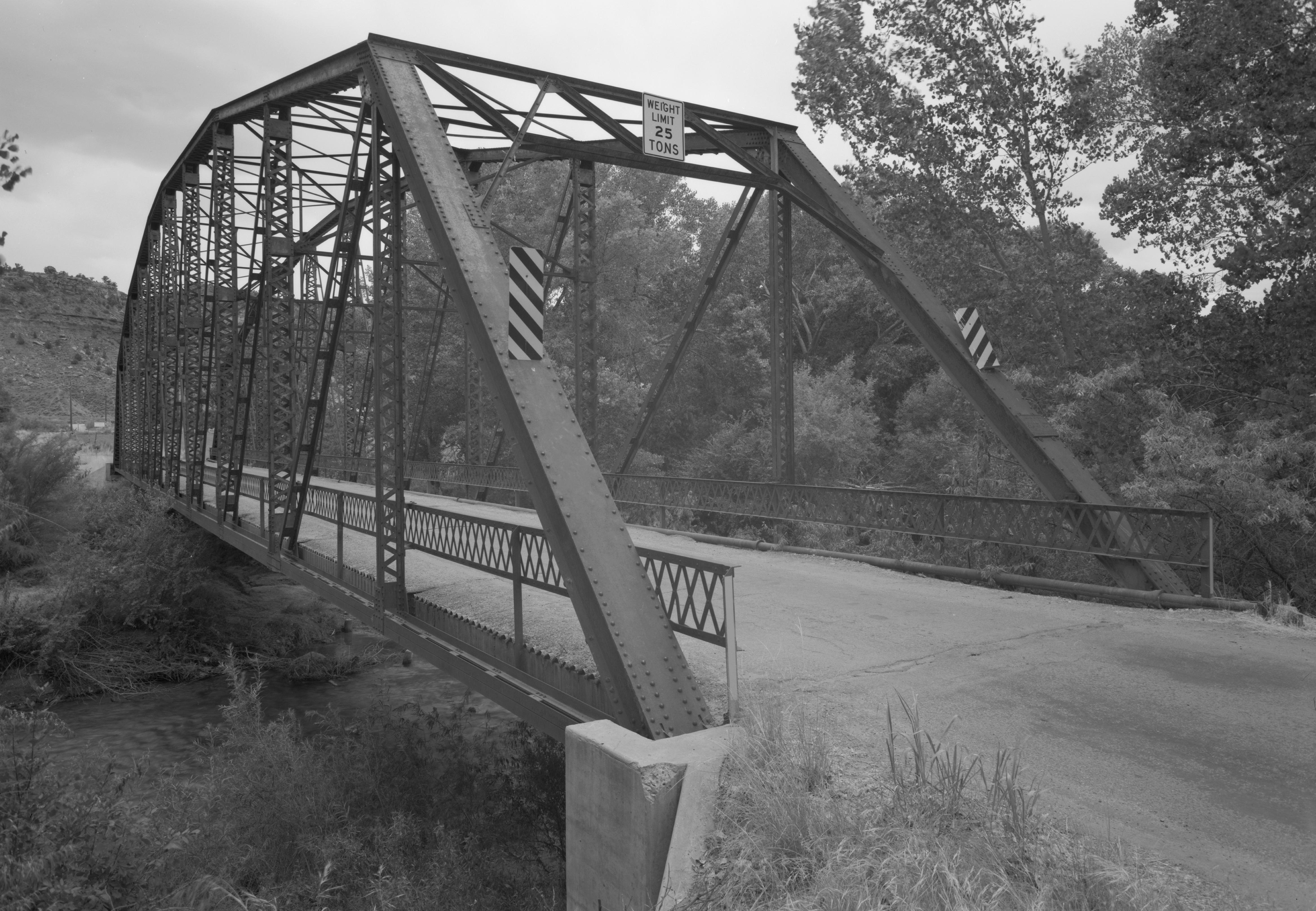
- Rockville Bridge in 1993

- Location within Utah Location within the United States
- Location: Bridge Road over East Fork of Virgin River, Rockville, Utah
- Coordinates: 37°9′30″N 113°2′16″W
- Area: less than one acre
- Built: 1924
- Built by: C. F. Dinsmore; Minneapolis Steel & Machinery Co.
- NRHP reference No.: 95000982
- Added to NRHP: August 4, 1995

The Rockville Bridge spans the east fork of the Virgin River in Rockville, Utah, United States. The bridge was built for the National Park Service in 1924 to provide a link between Zion National Park and the North Rim area of Grand Canyon National Park. The new bridge allowed motorists to take a circular tour of the national parks in southern Utah and northern Arizona. The Rockville route was superseded in 1928 by the construction of the Zion-Mount Carmel Highway.

The bridge was designed by the U.S. Bureau of Public Roads for the Park Service, fabricated by the Minneapolis Steel and Machinery Company, and erected by Ogden contractor C. F. Dinsmore. The bridge spans 217 feet (66 m) in a single span, using a steel twelve-panel Parker through-truss.

The Rockville Bridge was placed on the National Register of Historic Places in 1995.

== See also ==
- List of bridges documented by the Historic American Engineering Record in Utah
- List of bridges on the National Register of Historic Places in Utah
