= Shufelt =

Shufelt is a surname. Notable people with the surname include:

- Jessica Shufelt (born 1990), American soccer player
- Pete Shufelt (born 1969), American football player
- Robert "Shoofly" Shufelt (born 1935), American artist
- Sidney Shufelt (1824–1910), American politician
