= List of bridges on the National Register of Historic Places in Utah =

This is a list of bridges and tunnels on the National Register of Historic Places in the U.S. state of Utah.

Name	Image	Built	Listed	Location	County	Type
Cable Creek Bridge		1932	1996-02-16	Floor of the Valley Road, Zion National Park; 37°16′13″N 112°56′19″W	Washington	NPS Rustic
Dewey Bridge		1916 destroyed 2008	1984-07-12	Former routing of SR-128 over Colorado River, Dewey; 38°48′43″N 109°18′9″W	Grand	
Hurricane-LaVerkin Bridge		1908	1995-04-14	Old SR-9 over Virgin River, between Hurricane and La Verkin; 37°11′22″N 113°16′13″W	Washington	
Lincoln Highway Bridge		1900	1975-05-21	Old Lincoln Highway over Government Creek, Dugway Proving Ground; 40°10′58″N 112°55′23″W	Tooele	
Murphy Trail and Bridge		1917	1988-10-07	Sidehill viaduct on Murphy Trail descending from the Island in the Sky district, Canyonlands National Park; 38°20′30″N 109°52′30″W	San Juan	
Rockville Bridge	Rockville Bridge	1924	1995-08-04	Bridge Road over Virgin River, Rockville; 37°9′30″N 113°2′16″W	Washington	
San Rafael Bridge	San Rafael Bridge	1935, 1937	1996-06-03	Buckhorn Draw Road over San Rafael River, southeast of Castle Dale; 39°4′52″N 110°39′49″W	Emery	
Southern Pacific Railroad: Ogden-Lucin Cut-Off Trestle	Lucin Cut-Off Trestle	1902–1904	1972-04-14	Lucin Cutoff over Great Salt Lake, west of Ogden; 41°12′N 112°30′W	Box Elder	
Weber River Railroad Bridge	Weber River Railroad Bridge	1897	2015-04-06	0.5 miles (0.80 km) west of Union Station along Exchange Rd. 41°13′N 111°59′W	Weber	
Zion-Mount Carmel Highway	Zion-Mount Carmel Tunnel	1930	1987-07-07	SR-9 through Zion National Park bridges over North Fork Virgin River, Pine Creek (twice), Co-op Creek two tunnels, including the Zion-Mount Carmel Tunnel; 37°13′N 112°56′W	Washington	
