= New Mexico Museum of Space History =

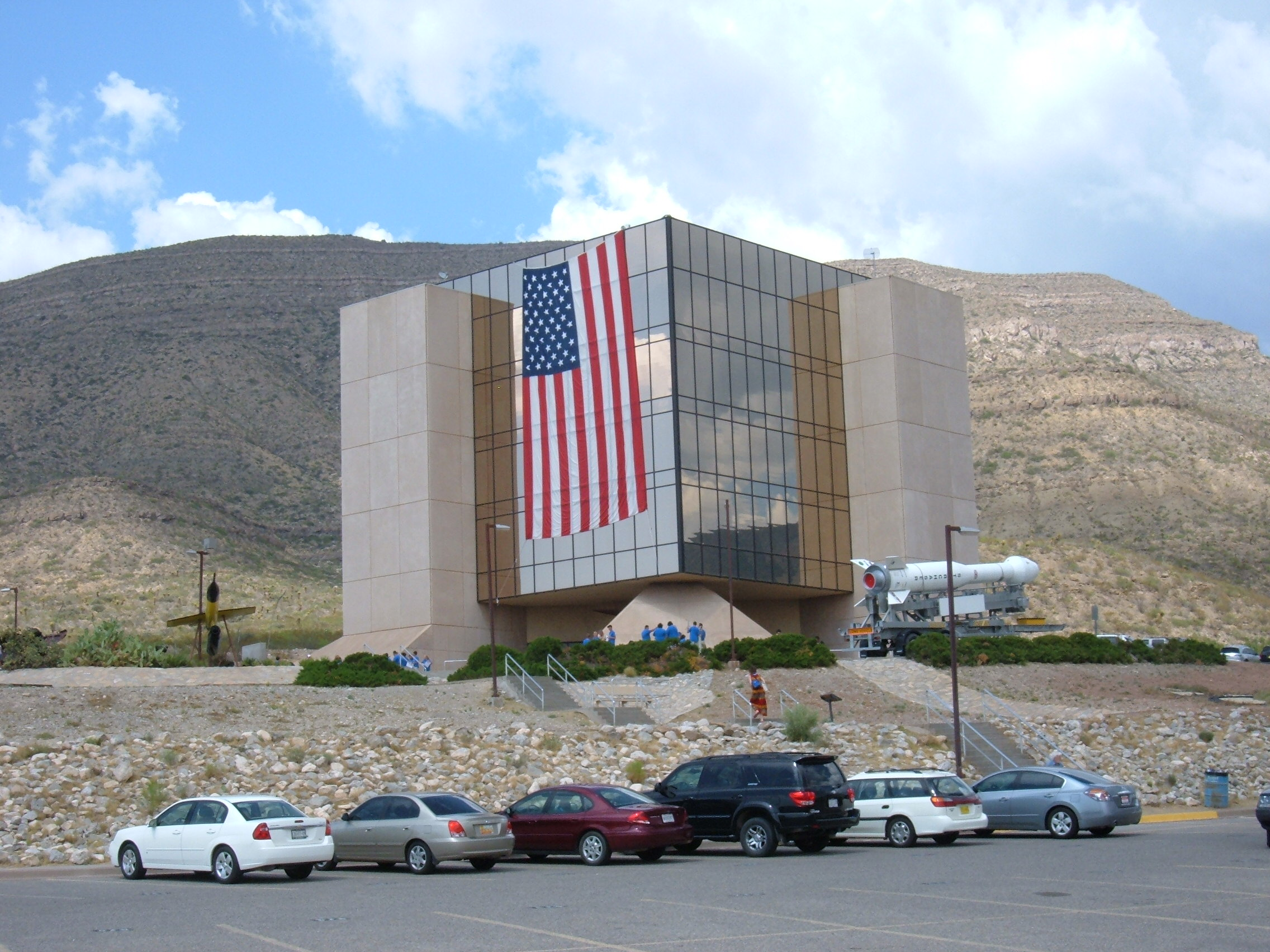
- Established: October 5, 1976; 49 years ago
- Location: Alamogordo, New Mexico
- Coordinates: 32.921024°N 105.920734°W
- Type: Aviation museum
- Visitors: 5,034,369 to date as of July 1, 2013
- Director: Kincaid Brady
- Curator: Brianna Buller
- Website: http://www.nmspacemuseum.org

The New Mexico Museum of Space History (NMMSH) is a museum and planetarium complex in Alamogordo, New Mexico, United States, dedicated to artifacts and displays related to space flight and the Space Age. It includes the International Space Hall of Fame. The Museum of Space History highlights the role that New Mexico has had in the U. S. space program, and is one of eight museums administered by the New Mexico Department of Cultural Affairs. The museum has been accredited by American Alliance of Museums since 1993. The museum is also a Smithsonian Affiliate.

The museum is the resting place of Ham, the chimpanzee who, in 1961, became the first great ape to fly into space.

== Exhibits ==
=== Main building ===
The museum includes exhibits about the planets of the Solar System, space flight and the primates that were used in early space flight experiments conducted by the United States. The museum holds mock-ups and training units of many important space artifacts such as satellites, the Space Shuttle, and the Apollo Lunar Module (the originals are still in space or on the Moon).

=== Outlying buildings ===
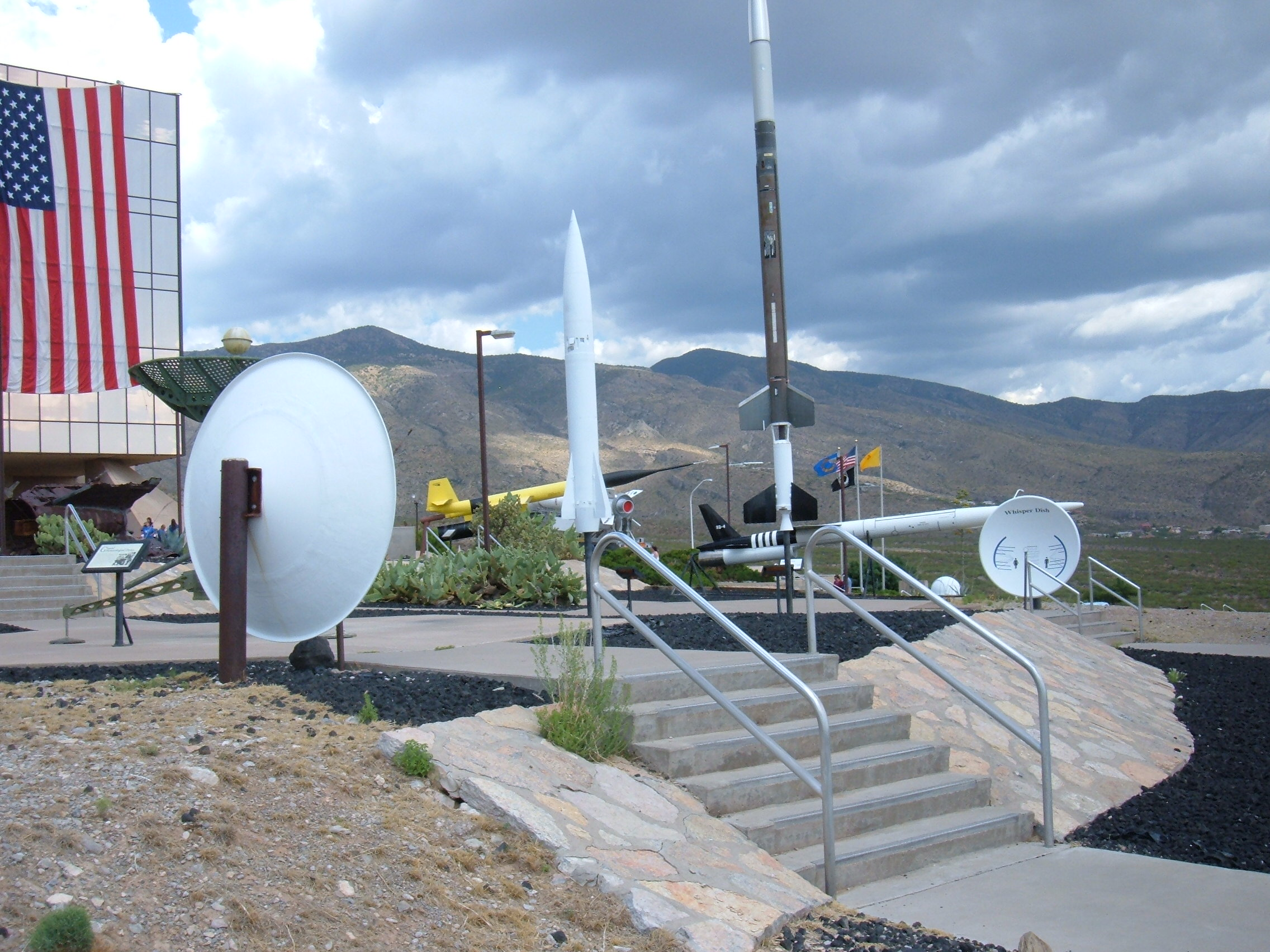
Displays at front entrance: sounding rockets used at Alamogordo and whisper dishes

The Clyde W. Tombaugh IMAX Theater and Planetarium has a projection dome that doubles as an IMAX screen and as a planetarium. IMAX-format films are screened daily.

The Hubbard Space Science Education Building was dedicated in spring 1991. It holds the museum's library, small archives and curatorial offices.

The Museum Support Center is an offsite warehouse and workshop that prepares items for display.

=== Outdoors ===
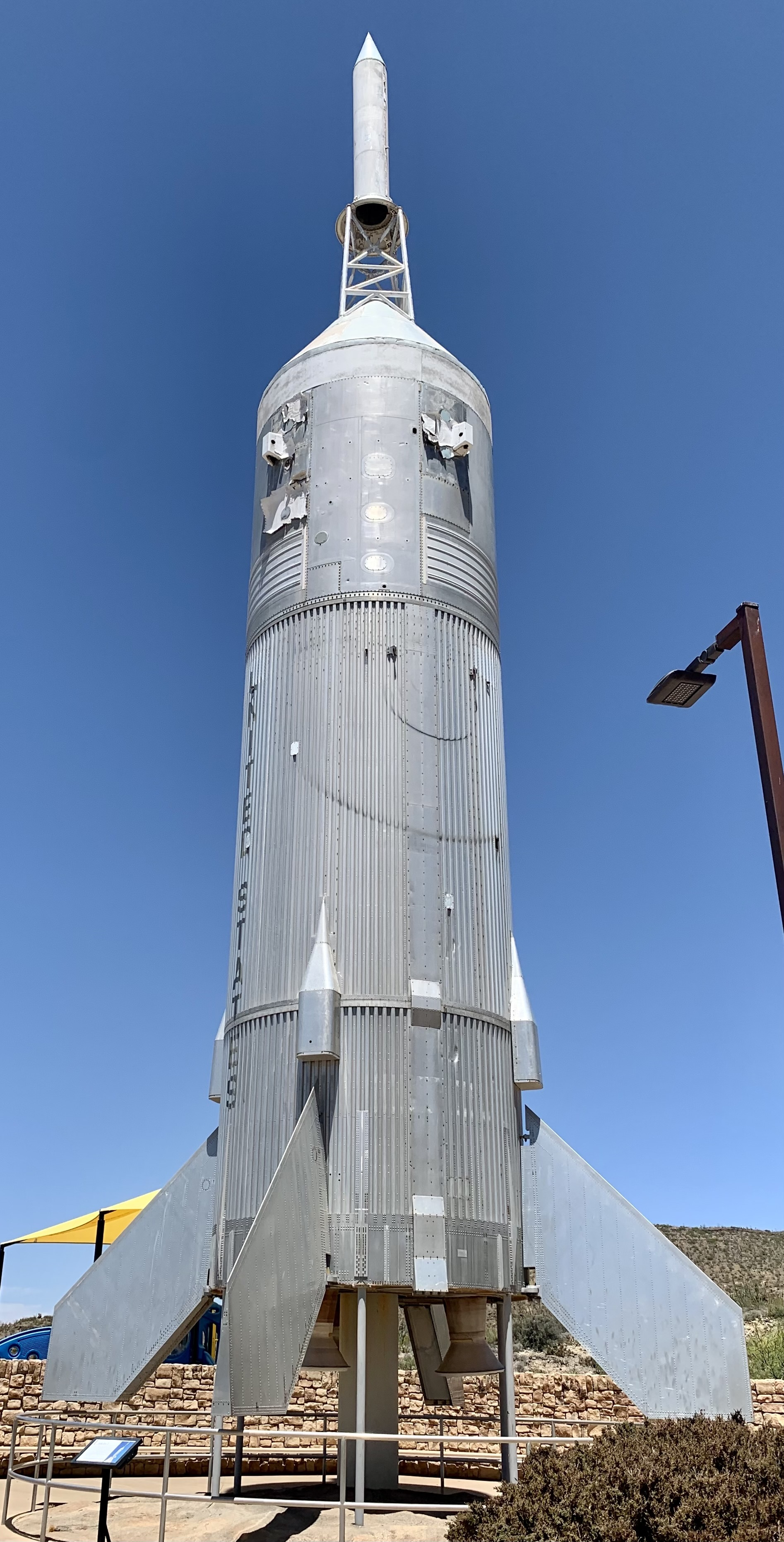
A Little Joe II in the museum's rocket park.

The John P. Stapp Air and Space Park is an outdoor exhibit area holding large artifacts, including the Sonic Wind No. 1 rocket sled ridden by Stapp.

Ham, the chimpanzee who in 1961 became the first ape in space, is buried at the museum in front of the flagpoles. Ham died in 1983.

The Astronaut Memorial Garden was created and dedicated to the memory of the astronauts who died in the Apollo 1 accident and Space Shuttle Challenger explosion. After the Space Shuttle Columbia disaster, the names of Columbia's astronauts were added to the memorial.

The Daisy Track (named after the Daisy air rifle) was an air-powered sled track used to test safety devices, including the ancestor of the automobile seat belt. The museum rescued the pieces of the Daisy Track in 1986 and reassembled them as an outdoor exhibit in 2004. The Daisy Track exhibit is partly outside and partly inside a building that has some other exhibits. A temporary exhibit about the Delta Clipper Experimental (DC-X) is also housed in this building.

== Programs ==
=== International Space Hall of Fame ===
The International Space Hall of Fame honors persons who have made great contributions to the advancement of space flight and technology. One of the museum exhibits is a collection of photos and biographies of inductees. Induction is held each year, typically in October.

=== New Mexico Space Academy Summer Camp ===
New Mexico Rocketeer Academy Summer Camp is a summer program started in 1986 to interest children in science and engineering. The program emphasizes rocketry, space science, space history, and astronomy. There are different classes for different ages groups. The program is open to cadets entering grades kindergarten through 12th grade.

=== Repository for Spaceport America ===
The New Mexico Spaceport Authority has declared the museum the repository for materials dealing with Spaceport America, a commercial spaceport near Upham.

=== Annual fireworks extravaganza ===
The museum puts on a large fireworks show every July 4, funded partly by the museum and partly by City of Alamogordo. It is visible all over the city, and museum members get to view it from the museum grounds.

== History ==
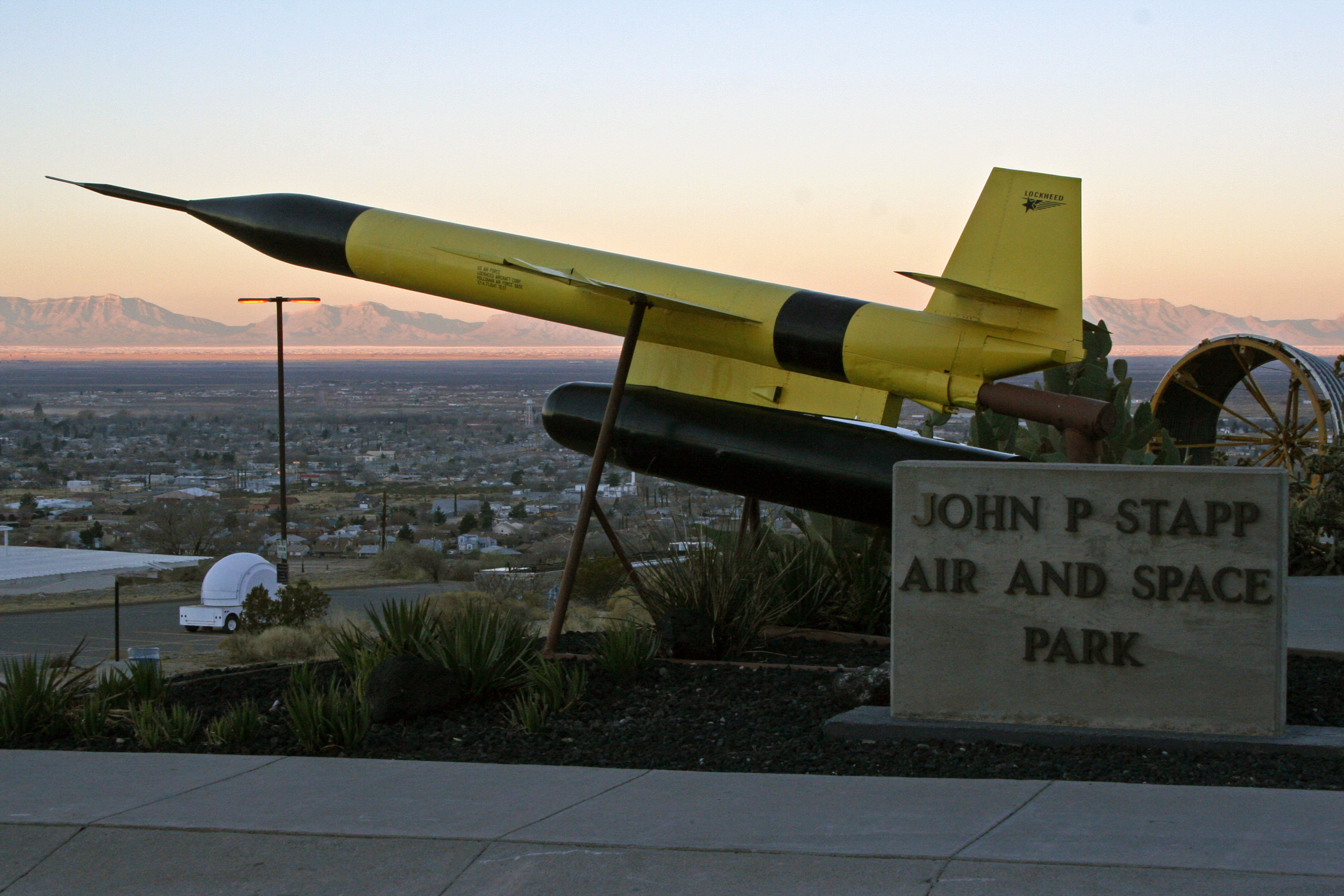
A Lockheed X-7 on display in the outdoor park.

The museum was originally created as the International Space Hall of Fame. In 1973 former Alamogordo mayor Dwight Ohlinger was inspired by the National Baseball Hall of Fame and Museum in Cooperstown, New York, to propose a Space Hall of Fame, and further to propose that it be built at Alamogordo because so much of the developmental work for the space program had been done in the Tularosa Basin. Ohlinger rallied support among elected officials at the local, state, and national levels, and Governor Bruce King adopted the idea into the Office of Cultural Affairs. The early plans called for displays of space-related artifacts and the inclusion of a planetarium.

Charles E. Nolan and Associates were hired as the architects. The main building was designed and constructed as a "golden cube" (a cube with a gold-tinted glass exterior) and dedicated on October 5, 1976, opening to the public on November 23, 1976. At the dedication ceremony the initial fifteen Hall of Fame members were inducted.

The planetarium was constructed in combination with an IMAX theater and opened in 1981. In 1987 the name of the facility was changed to Space Center, reflecting the growing role of the exhibits. In 2001 the name changed again to its present name of New Mexico Museum of Space History.

In 2014, the museum acquired some artefacts excavated from the Atari video game burial. The museum helped appraise some of the artefacts and prepare them for sale.
