= Green Bridge (Las Cruces, New Mexico) =

- U.S. National Register of Historic Places
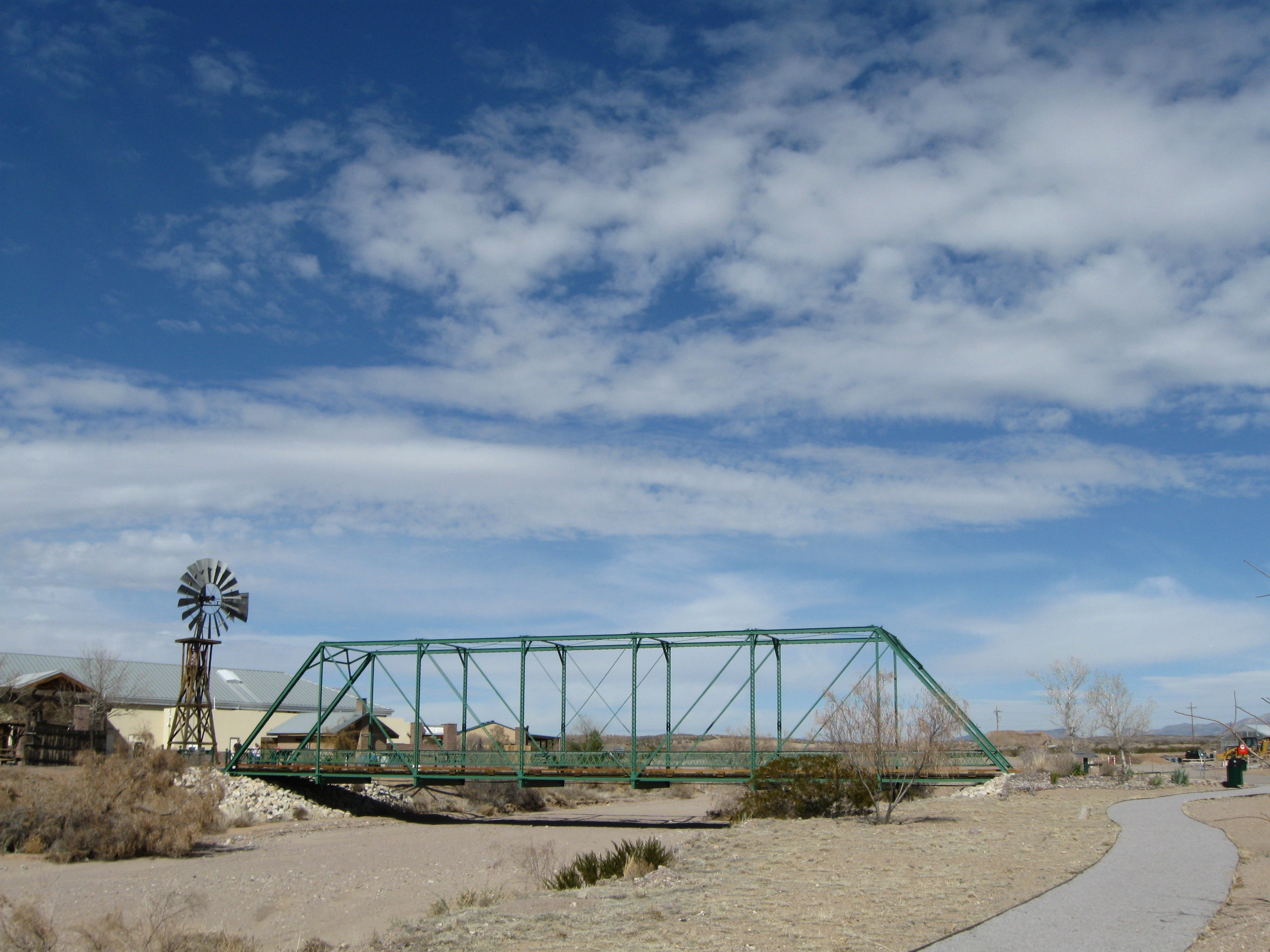

- Location within New Mexico
- Nearest city: Las Cruces, New Mexico
- Coordinates: 32°17′56″N 106°43′13″W
- Area: less than one acre
- Built: 1902, 1943, 2007
- Built by: Midland Bridge Co.
- Architectural style: Pratt Through Truss
- MPS: Historic Highway Bridges of New Mexico MPS
- NRHP reference No.: 08000791
- Added to NRHP: August 21, 2008

The Green Bridge, on the outskirts of Las Cruces, New Mexico in Doña Ana County, New Mexico, was built in 1943. It was listed on the National Register of Historic Places in 2008.

It is a single-span Pratt through truss bridge built by the Midland Bridge Co. The bridge has pinned connections that tie together seven 19-foot panel sections. It is 134 feet (41 m) long and 17 feet (5.2 m) wide.

It currently is on the property of the New Mexico Farm and Ranch Heritage Museum, at 4100 Dripping Springs Rd., just outside Las Cruces. It spans the Tortugas Arroyo, a dry wash. It originally was the middle one of a three-span bridge over the Pecos River, which was built in 1902. That location was in Chaves County. It was moved in 1943 to bring a small county road over the Rio Hondo, near the village of Picacho in Lincoln County. It was removed from service in 1989 by construction of a bypass. It was eventually donated to the New Mexico Farm and Ranch Heritage Museum, which moved it to its present location in 2007.

In its previous locations, it has also been known as the Rio Hondo Bridge at Picacho, as Bridge 3452, and as Pecos River Bridge.
