= List of bridges documented by the Historic American Engineering Record in Utah =

This is a list of bridges documented by the Historic American Engineering Record in the US state of Utah.

== Bridges ==
Survey No.	Name (as assigned by HAER)	Status	Type	Built	Documented	Carries	Crosses	Location	County	Coordinates
UT-2-A	Telluride Power Company, Provo River Bridge		Pratt truss	1898	1971		Provo River	Orem	Utah	
UT-13	Southern Pacific Railroad, Ogden-Lucin Cutoff Trestle	Replaced	Trestle	1904	1971	Southern Pacific Railroad	Great Salt Lake	Brigham City	Box Elder	41°13′00″N 112°41′40″W
UT-14; UT-63-C	Denver and Rio Grande Western Railroad, Provo River Bridge; Heber Creeper Railroad Line, Olmstead Bridge	Extant	Pratt truss	1884	1971; 1991	Heber Valley Railroad	Provo River	Orem	Utah	40°18′55″N 111°39′16″W
UT-27	Union Pacific Railroad, Gateway Bridge	Extant	Lattice truss	1899	1971	Union Pacific Railroad	Weber Canyon	Ogden	Weber	41°08′19″N 111°51′38″W
UT-37	Uintah Bridge	Replaced	Pratt truss	1900	1985	East 6600 South	Weber River	Uintah	Weber	41°08′50″N 111°57′35″W
UT-39-B	Zion-Mount Carmel Highway, Pine Creek Bridge	Extant	Stone arch	1930	1984	SR-9 (Zion – Mount Carmel Highway)	Pine Creek	Springdale	Washington	37°12′59″N 112°57′56″W
UT-39-C	Zion-Mount Carmel Highway, Virgin River Bridge	Extant	Steel rolled multi-beam	1930	1984	SR-9 (Zion – Mount Carmel Highway)	Virgin River north fork	Springdale	Washington	37°13′03″N 112°58′30″W
UT-39-D	Zion-Mount Carmel Highway, Co-op Creek Bridge	Replaced	Reinforced concrete girder	1929	1992	SR-9 (Zion – Mount Carmel Highway)	Co-op Creek	Springdale	Washington	37°13′51″N 112°52′42″W
UT-39-E	Zion-Mount Carmel Highway, 62-foot Concrete Arch Pine Creek Bridge	Replaced	Reinforced concrete open-spandrel arch	1930	1991	SR-9 (Zion – Mount Carmel Highway)	Clear Creek	Springdale	Washington	37°13′23″N 112°54′25″W
UT-39-J	Zion-Mount Carmel Highway, Upper Pine Creek Bridge	Replaced	Steel rolled multi-beam	1929	1992	SR-9 (Zion – Mount Carmel Highway)	Upper Pine Creek	Springdale	Washington	37°12′47″N 112°56′27″W
UT-48	Benson Bridge	Replaced	Pratt truss	1915	1987	West 3000 North	Cutler Reservoir	Benson	Cache	41°47′12″N 111°57′20″W
UT-49	Henefer Bridge	Replaced	Pratt truss	1908	1987	East Center Street	Weber River	Henefer	Summit	41°01′05″N 111°29′43″W
UT-50	Jensen Bridge	Replaced	Parker truss	1933	1987	US 40	Green River	Jensen	Uintah	40°22′06″N 109°20′00″W
UT-55	Standard Mine, Timber Trestle	Abandoned	Trestle	1913	1987	Standard Coal Company No. 2 Mine tramway	Gilson Gulch	Standardville	Carbon	39°42′35″N 110°56′09″W
UT-57	Marysvale Bridge	Bypassed	Warren truss	1909	1988	East Rio Grande Avenue	Sevier River	Marysvale	Piute	38°26′56″N 112°13′12″W
UT-58	Fairmont Bridge	Replaced	Pratt truss	1910	1989		Ogden River	Ogden	Weber	41°14′27″N 111°54′10″W
UT-59	Virgin River Bridge	Replaced	Reinforced concrete open-spandrel arch	1934	1990	SR-9	Virgin River	Hurricane	Washington	37°09′46″N 113°23′43″W
UT-60	San Rafael Bridge	Extant	Suspension	1937	1989		San Rafael River	Castle Dale	Emery	39°04′52″N 110°40′03″W
UT-61	Provo River Bridge	Replaced	Reinforced concrete closed-spandrel arch	1919	1990	West Columbia Lane	Provo River	Provo	Utah	40°15′05″N 111°40′11″W
UT-62; UT-62-A	Ogden River Bridge; Odgen River Bridge Sign	Replaced; Relocated	Reinforced concrete T-beam; Steel trussed arch	1924; 1936	1991	US 89 (South Washington Boulevard)	Ogden River	Ogden	Weber	41°14′02″N 111°58′13″W
UT-63-B	Heber Creeper Railroad Line, Vivian Park Bridge	Extant	Trestle	1913	1991	Heber Valley Railroad	Provo River south fork	Provo	Utah	40°21′21″N 111°34′36″W
UT-64	Promontory Route Railroad Trestles	Abandoned	Trestle	1872	1991	Union Pacific Railroad	Drainage channels	Corinne	Box Elder	
UT-64-A	Promontory Route Railroad Trestles, Trestle 788B	Abandoned	Trestle	1872	1991	Union Pacific Railroad	Drainage channel	Corinne	Box Elder	41°36′15″N 112°20′24″W
UT-64-B	Promontory Route Railroad Trestles, Trestle 789B	Abandoned	Trestle	1872	1991	Union Pacific Railroad	Drainage channel	Corinne	Box Elder	41°35′57″N 112°19′21″W
UT-64-C	Promontory Route Railroad Trestles, Trestle 789C	Abandoned	Trestle	1872	1991	Union Pacific Railroad	Drainage channel	Corinne	Box Elder	41°35′55″N 112°19′13″W
UT-64-D	Promontory Route Railroad Trestles, Trestle 790A	Abandoned	Trestle	1872	1991	Union Pacific Railroad	Drainage channel	Corinne	Box Elder	41°35′48″N 112°18′49″W
UT-64-E	Promontory Route Railroad Trestles, Trestle 790B	Abandoned	Trestle	1872	1991	Union Pacific Railroad	Drainage channel	Corinne	Box Elder	41°35′41″N 112°18′23″W
UT-64-F	Promontory Route Railroad Trestles, Trestle 790C	Abandoned	Trestle	1872	1991	Union Pacific Railroad	Drainage channel	Corinne	Box Elder	41°35′33″N 112°17′55″W
UT-64-G	Promontory Route Railroad Trestles, Trestle 791B	Abandoned	Trestle	1872	1991	Union Pacific Railroad	Drainage channel	Corinne	Box Elder	41°35′19″N 112°17′06″W
UT-64-H	Promontory Route Railroad Trestles, Trestle 779.91	Abandoned	Trestle	1889	2004	Union Pacific Railroad	Drainage channel	Corinne	Box Elder	41°39′41″N 112°28′01″W
UT-65	Box Elder Creek Arch Bridge	Demolished	Reinforced concrete closed-spandrel arch	1912	1991		Box Elder Creek south fork	Mantua	Box Elder	41°29′55″N 111°57′18″W
UT-68	Jordan Narrows Bridge	Bypassed	Pratt truss	1915	1993	9600 North	Jordan River	Lehi	Utah	40°24′22″N 111°54′00″W
UT-69	Gould Wash Bridge	Replaced	Reinforced concrete T-beam	1937	1993	SR-9	Gould Wash	Hurricane	Washington	37°10′35″N 113°18′51″W
UT-70-A	Arches National Park Main Entrance Road, Moab Canyon Wash Culvert		Stone arch	1941	1993	Arches National Park main entrance road	Moab Canyon wash	Moab	Grand	38°36′54″N 109°37′05″W
UT-72	Zion National Park Roads and Bridges	Extant			1993			Springdale	Washington	
UT-72-B	Oak Creek Administrative Center Bridge	Extant	Reinforced concrete cast-in-place slab	1926	1993		Oak Creek	Springdale	Washington	37°12′30″N 112°58′52″W
UT-73-A	Floor of the Valley Road, Cable Creek Bridge	Extant	Reinforced concrete T-beam	1931	1993	Floor of the Valley Road	Cable Creek	Springdale	Washington	37°16′13″N 112°56′23″W
UT-74	Rockville Bridge	Extant	Parker truss	1924	1993	Bridge Road	Virgin River north fork	Rockville	Washington	37°09′30″N 113°02′16″W
UT-75	Virgin River Bridge	Extant	Steel hinged arch	1937	1993	SR-9 westbound	Virgin River	Hurricane and La Verkin	Washington	37°11′25″N 113°16′40″W
UT-76	Virgin River Warren Truss Bridge	Extant	Warren truss	1908	1993	Trail	Virgin River	Hurricane	Washington	37°11′23″N 113°16′22″W
UT-77	Capitol Reef National Park Roads and Bridges	Extant			1993			Torrey	Wayne	
UT-79	Dewey Bridge	Bypassed	Suspension	1916	1993	SR-128	Colorado River	Cisco	Grand	38°48′43″N 109°18′11″W
UT-80	Escalante River Bridge	Replaced	Reinforced concrete cast-in-place slab	1940	1994	SR-12	Escalante River	Escalante	Garfield	37°46′33″N 111°25′07″W
UT-81	La Verkin Creek Bridge	Replaced	Reinforced concrete girder	1930	1994	SR-17	La Verkin Creek	La Verkin	Washington	37°13′10″N 113°16′33″W
UT-82	Huntington Creek Bridge	Replaced	Reinforced concrete girder	1941	1994	SR-10	Huntington Creek	Huntington	Emery	39°20′20″N 110°57′43″W
UT-86	Lost Creek Road Bridge	Replaced	Timber stringer	1935	1996	CR 243	Sevier River	Aurora	Sevier	38°55′31″N 111°53′51″W
UT-87	Nebeker Lane Bridge	Replaced	Timber stringer	1935	1996	CR 258	Sevier River	Annabella	Sevier	38°42′57″N 112°04′18″W
UT-88	Sevier River Bridge	Replaced	Timber stringer	1935	1996	Tamarix Road	Sevier River	Leamington	Millard	39°32′14″N 112°16′37″W
UT-89	Lower San Rafael River Bridge	Replaced	Bailey bridge	1940	1996	CR 101	San Rafael River	Green River	Emery	38°45′27″N 110°08′37″W
UT-90	Mounds Bridge	Replaced	Warren truss	1914	1996	CR 115	Price River	Elmo	Emery	39°26′59″N 110°37′42″W
UT-91	Price River Bridge	Replaced	Pratt truss	1918	1997	760 North	Price River	Price	Carbon	39°36′41″N 110°49′56″W

== See also ==
- List of tunnels documented by the Historic American Engineering Record in Utah
