= List of tunnels documented by the Historic American Engineering Record in Utah =

This is a list of tunnels documented by the Historic American Engineering Record in the US state of Utah.

== Tunnels ==
Survey No.	Name (as assigned by HAER)	Built	Documented	Carries	Crosses	Location	County	Coordinates
UT-39-A	Zion-Mount Carmel Highway, Tunnel	1930	1984	SR-9 (Zion – Mount Carmel Highway)	Rock outcrop	Springdale	Washington	37°12′36″N 112°57′28″W
UT-39-H	Zion-Mount Carmel Highway, Short Tunnel	1930	1992	SR-9 (Zion – Mount Carmel Highway)	Rock outcrop	Springdale	Washington	37°13′05″N 112°55′22″W
UT-42-G	High Mountain Dams in Upalco Unit, Farmers Lake Tunnel	1920	1985	Farmers Lake outlet		Mountain Home	Duchesne	40°41′48″N 110°22′27″W
UT-83	Red Canyon Tunnel		1993	SR-12	Rock outcrop	Panguitch	Garfield	37°44′26″N 112°17′52″W

== See also ==
- List of bridges documented by the Historic American Engineering Record in Utah
