= Caddo Lake Drawbridge =

- Caddo Lake Bridge
- U.S. National Register of Historic Places
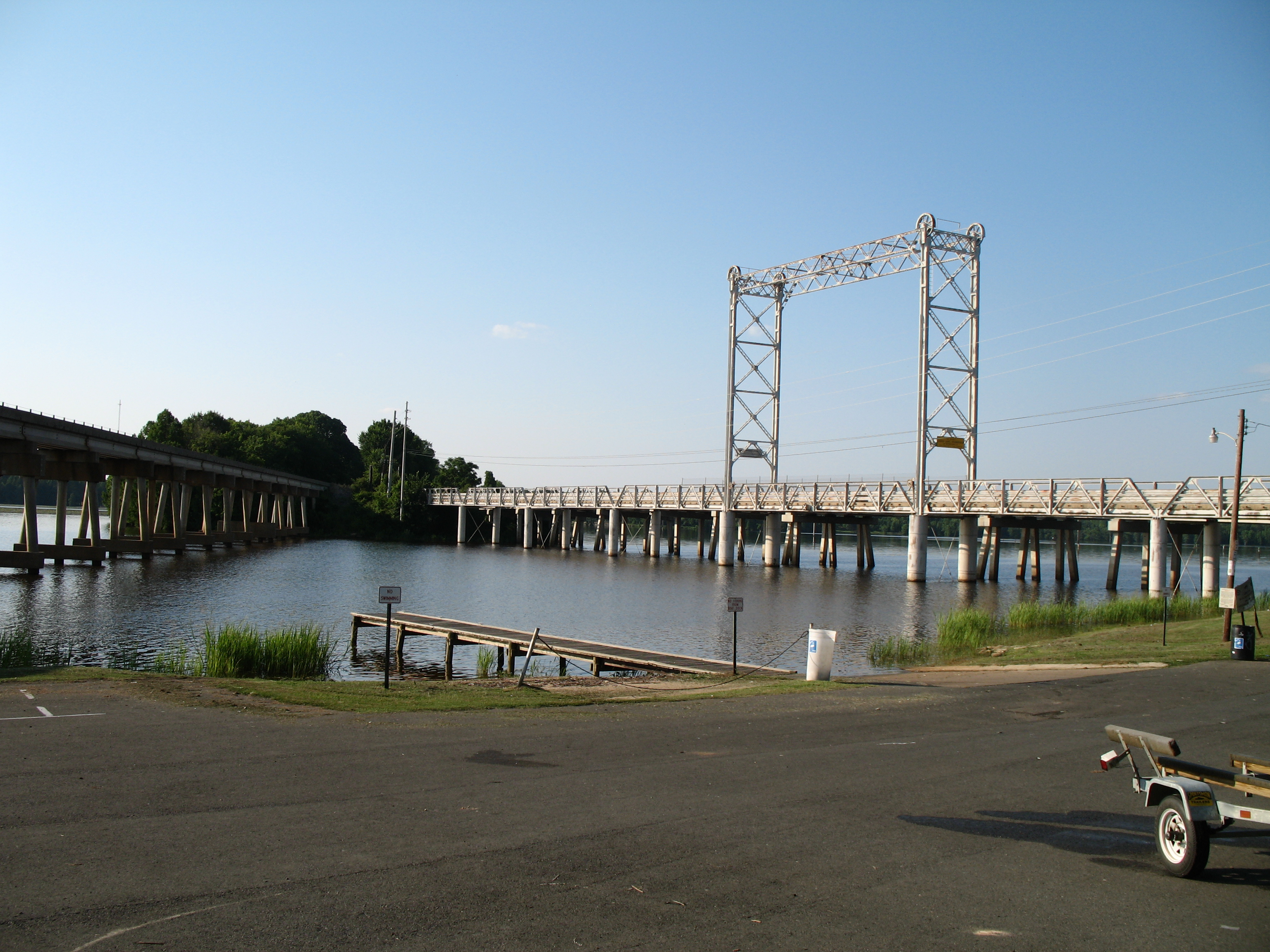
- Caddo Lake Drawbridge in 2007

- Location within Louisiana
- Location: Across Caddo Lake, next modern LA 538 bridge, Mooringsport, Louisiana
- Coordinates: 32°41′47″N 93°57′28″W
- Area: less than one acre
- Built: 1914
- Architect: Waddell & Harrington; Midland Bridge Co.
- NRHP reference No.: 96001166
- Added to NRHP: October 18, 1996

The Historic Caddo Lake Drawbridge, also known as the Mooringsport Bridge, is a vertical-lift bridge that is listed on the U.S. National Register of Historic Places. It was built in 1914, to replace a ferry, by the Midland Bridge Company of Kansas City, Missouri, under authority of the Caddo Parish Police Jury. The lift span has been inoperable since the 1940s.

This vehicular bridge illustrates the "Vertical-Lift" design of John Alexander Low Waddell of the firm of Waddell & Harrington. This design allowed the entire center span to lift in a vertical direction to allow tall oil equipment to pass through, especially Gulf Oil Company's pile driver. This design was invented in 1893 and was successfully introduced in Chicago with the South Halsted Street Bridge. The Caddo Lake Drawbridge is a direct descendant of this structure.

In the summer of 1941, just prior to World War II, the United States Army held maneuvers in and around Mooringsport as a means of preparing the soldiers for war. During the maneuvers, Generals Dwight D. Eisenhower and George S. Patton came to Mooringsport and led the Red and Blue armies in the "capture" of the bridge. They also bombed the bridge with sacks of flour.

In the mid-1940s, ownership of the bridge was transferred away from Caddo Parish to the Louisiana Department of Highways (LA Department of Transportation & Development, abbreviated as DOTD). Shortly after the transfer, the Department of Highways realized that there was no longer a need for the bridge to open. Consequently, the concrete counterweights were removed from the bridge's tower and dropped in the lake.

In the late 1970s, due to the narrow width of the bridge, the flow of vehicular traffic was changed to one alternating lane. At this time, the DOTD determined that the useful life of the bridge had been exhausted and it was time to consider its replacement. In 1989, the DOTD received funds from the Federal Highway Administration for a bridge replacement project. The project called for the construction of a new two lane bridge approximately fifty feet to the east of the old bridge. The construction proposal also called for the old bridge to be destroyed when the new one was completed. A citizen's campaign was launched with involvement of Local, State and Federal officials and political leaders. The objective was to save the Historic Caddo Lake Drawbridge and convert its use into a pedestrian walkway, landmark, and tourist attraction. After two years of negotiations, the DOTD and the Federal Highway Administration agreed to use the funds appropriated for removing the structure to refurbish the bridge instead. This agreement was made with the stipulation that Caddo Parish agrees to assume ownership and liability. On June 26, 1991, the Caddo Parish Commissioners voted to accept the bridge into the Caddo Parish Department of Parks and Recreation.

On July 24, 1991, The Historic American Engineering Record (U.S. Dept. of the Interior/National Park Service) rendered their evaluation of the bridge. The evaluation indicated that the bridge is nationally significant due to its designer, its unique design, and the fact that it is the sole surviving example of this bridge type in the State of Louisiana. With this determination, the bridge was eligible to be presented for listing on the National Register of Historic Places. Due to a unique state law that forbade the application process, this was delayed until ownership changed.

After the bridge was cleaned, painted and barricaded to vehicular traffic, ownership of the bridge was transferred back to the Parish of Caddo on October 3, 1995. A rededication ceremony was held in Mooringsport later that month to mark the saving of the town's chief landmark and to honor those who had contributed to the endeavor. On June 4, 1996, a public hearing was held in Baton Rouge by the State's Review Committee regarding nomination of the bridge to the National Register of Historic Places. On October 18, 1996, the Historic Caddo Lake Drawbridge was officially entered into the National Register of Historic Places under the provisions of the National Historic Preservation Act of 1966.

== See also ==
- Caddo Lake
- Caddo Lake State Park
- National Register of Historic Places listings in Caddo Parish, Louisiana
- List of bridges on the National Register of Historic Places in Louisiana
