= Transcontinental Railroad Grade =

- U.S. National Register of Historic Places
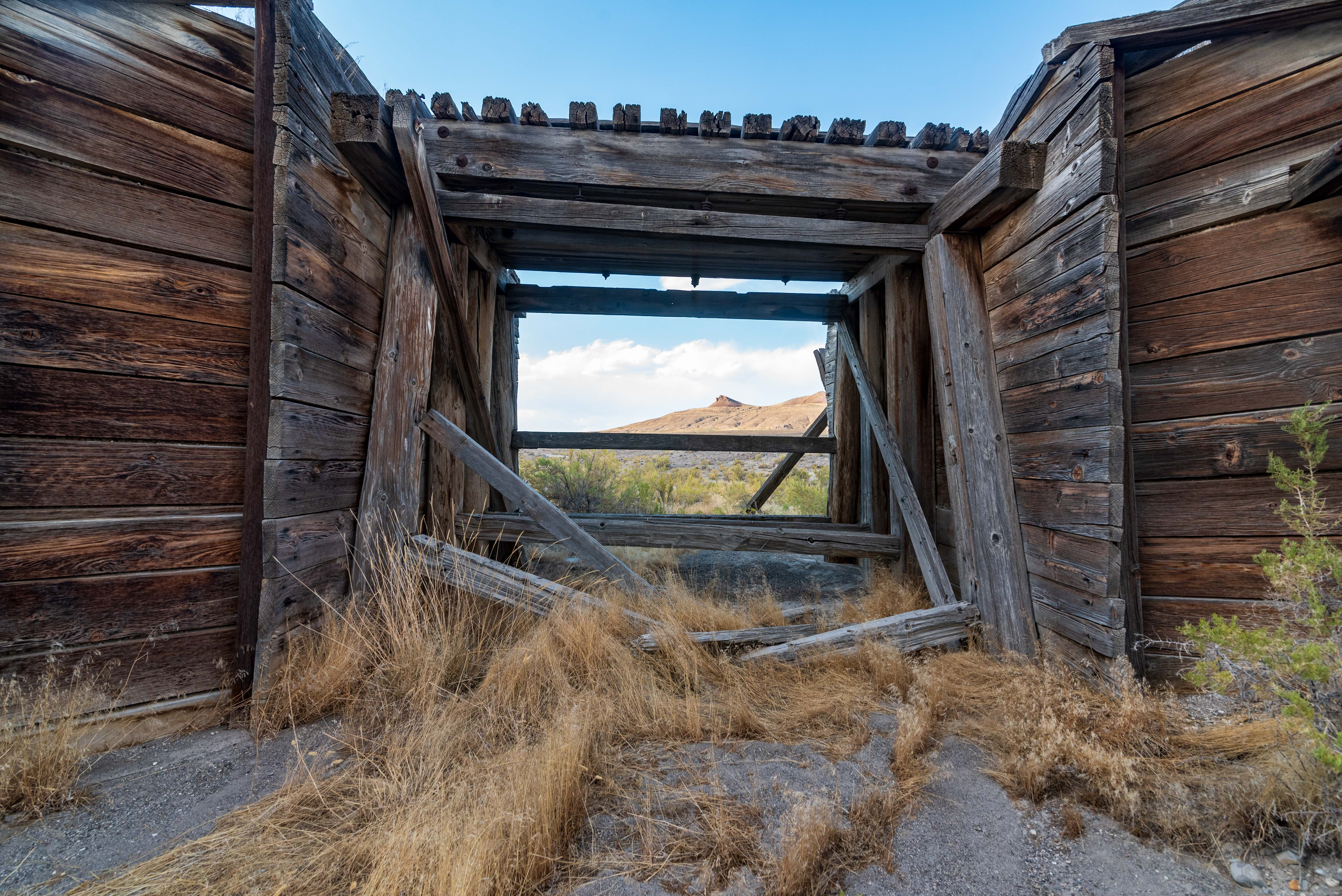
- Railway trestle in the section

- Location within Utah Location within the United States
- Nearest city: Corinne, Utah
- Coordinates: 41°36′55″N 112°20′40″W
- Area: 655 acres (2.65 km^{2})
- Built: 1869
- NRHP reference No.: 94001423
- Added to NRHP: December 8, 1994

The Transcontinental Railroad Grade is a section of railway in northwest Utah, United States, near Corinne, which was listed on the National Register of Historic Places in 1994.

It is an abandoned 13.5 miles (21.7 km) section of the original 1869 grade of the first transcontinental railroad. Its raised grade (trackway), 11 trestles, and 21 culverts were built in 1869 or in years soon after. This section was built poorly by the Union Pacific, consistent with financial incentives, and was acquired by the Central Pacific in 1869, which found it necessary to replace trestles and otherwise rebuild the route here.

The trestles were built largely with redwood, and have vertical round beams supporting stringers supporting railway ties. Just three of them were in good condition in 1992.

The section runs roughly from 6 miles (9.7 km) miles west of Corinne for about 13 miles (21 km) further west along what is now Utah State Route 83. It is near Promontory Summit where the ceremonial golden spike was hammered in to complete the six-year project by three companies to build the transcontinental railway.

== See also ==
- List of bridges documented by the Historic American Engineering Record in Utah
- National Register of Historic Places listings in Box Elder County, Utah
