= Hurricane–LaVerkin Bridge =

- U.S. National Register of Historic Places
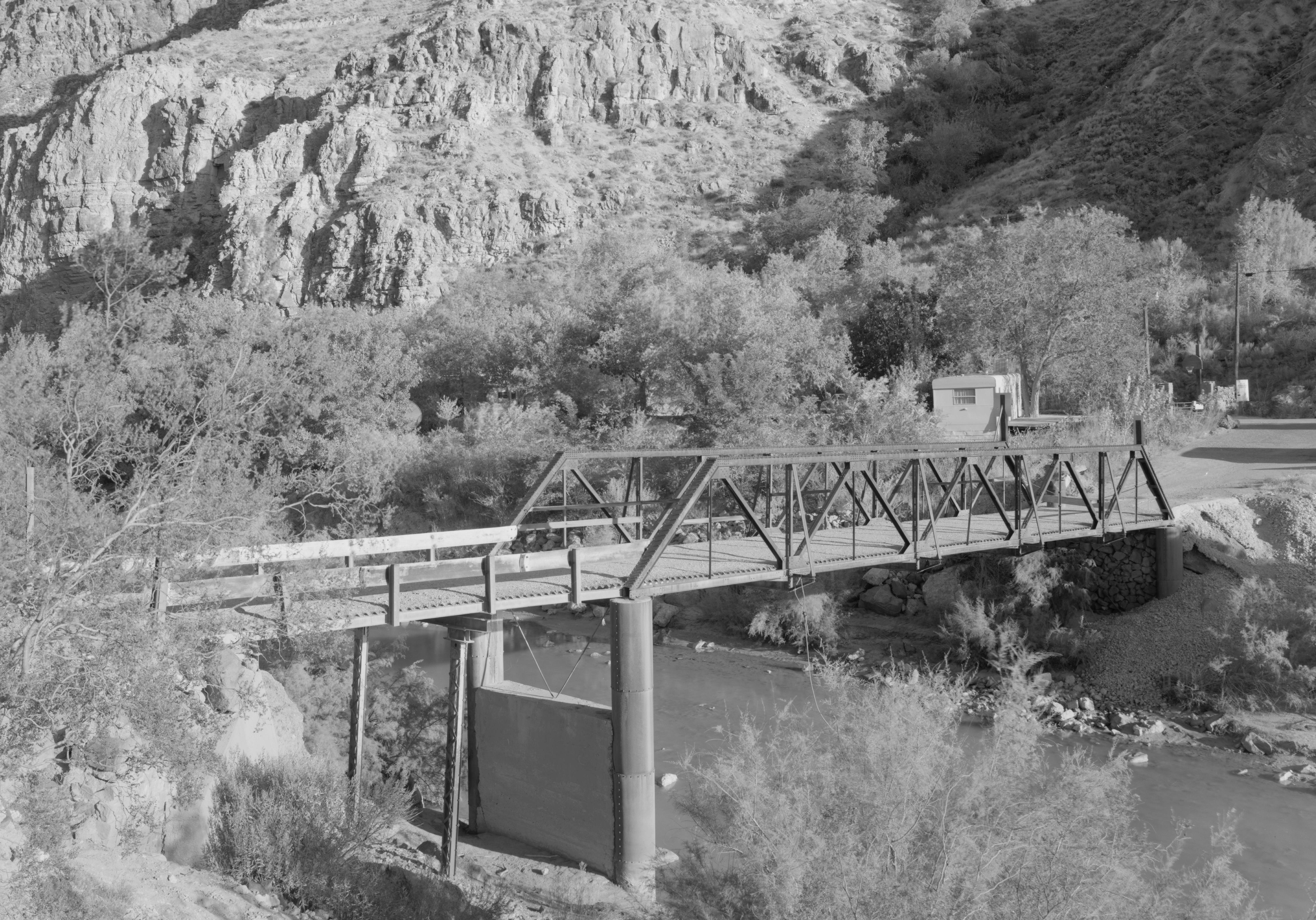
- Hurricane–LaVerkin Bridge in 1993

- Location within Utah Location within the United States
- Location: East of Utah State Route 9 over the Virgin River, Hurricane, Utah
- Coordinates: 37°11′23″N 113°16′22″W
- Area: Less than one acre
- Built: 1908
- Built by: Midland Bridge Company
- NRHP reference No.: 95000413
- Added to NRHP: April 14, 1995

The Hurricane–LaVerkin Bridge spans the Virgin River, connecting the towns of Hurricane and La Verkin in southern Utah, United States.

== Description ==
The five-panel steel Warren pony truss spans 75 feet (23 m), and is supported by concrete-filled steel cylinder piers. It is one of the oldest Warren pony truss bridges in Utah, built in 1908 by the Midland Bridge Company.

The Hurricane–LaVerkin Bridge was placed on the National Register of Historic Places on April 14, 1995.

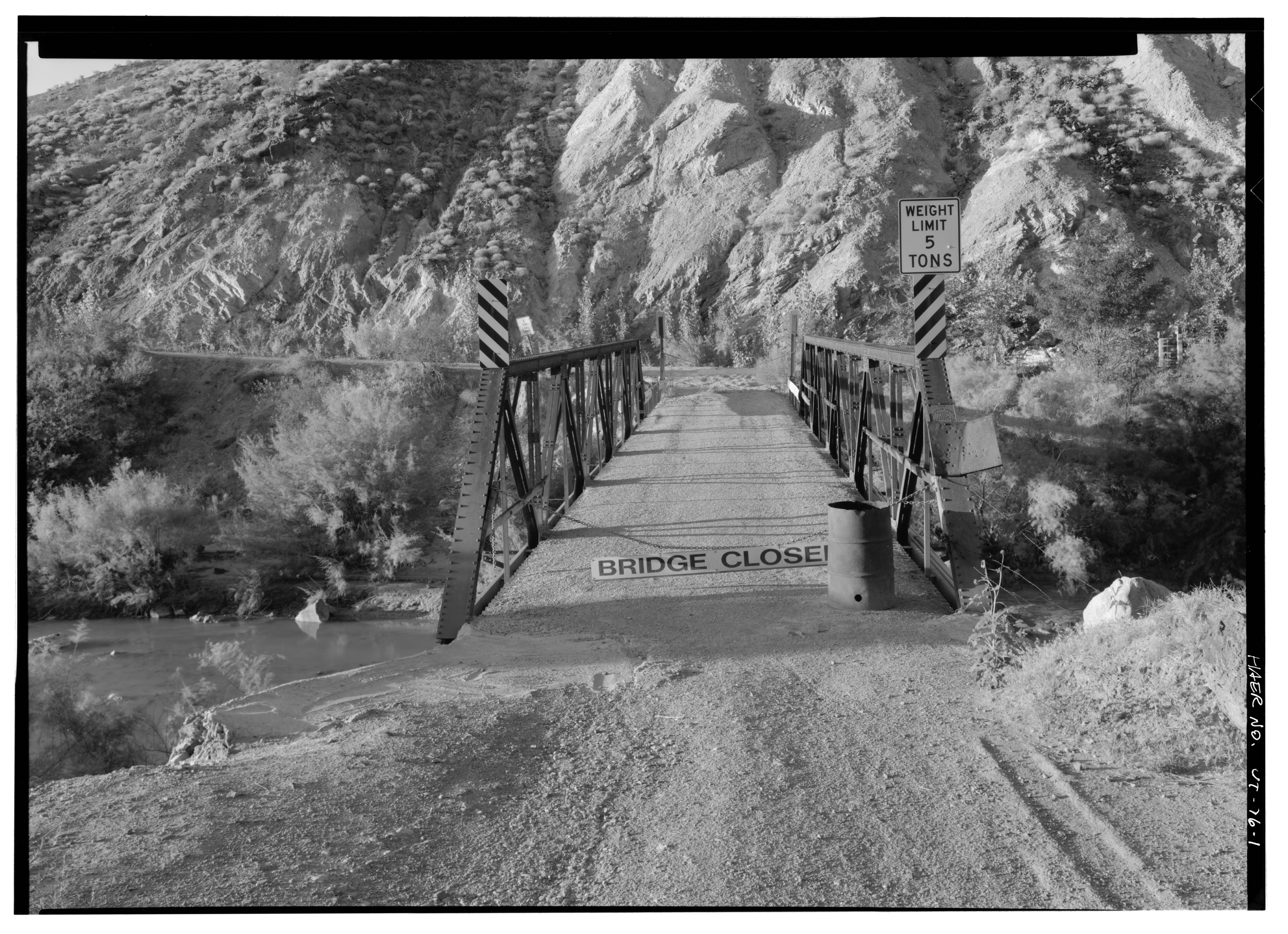
View across Hurricane–LaVerkin Bridge in 1993

== See also ==
- List of bridges documented by the Historic American Engineering Record in Utah
- List of bridges on the National Register of Historic Places in Utah
- National Register of Historic Places listings in Washington County, Utah
