= Midland Bridge Company =

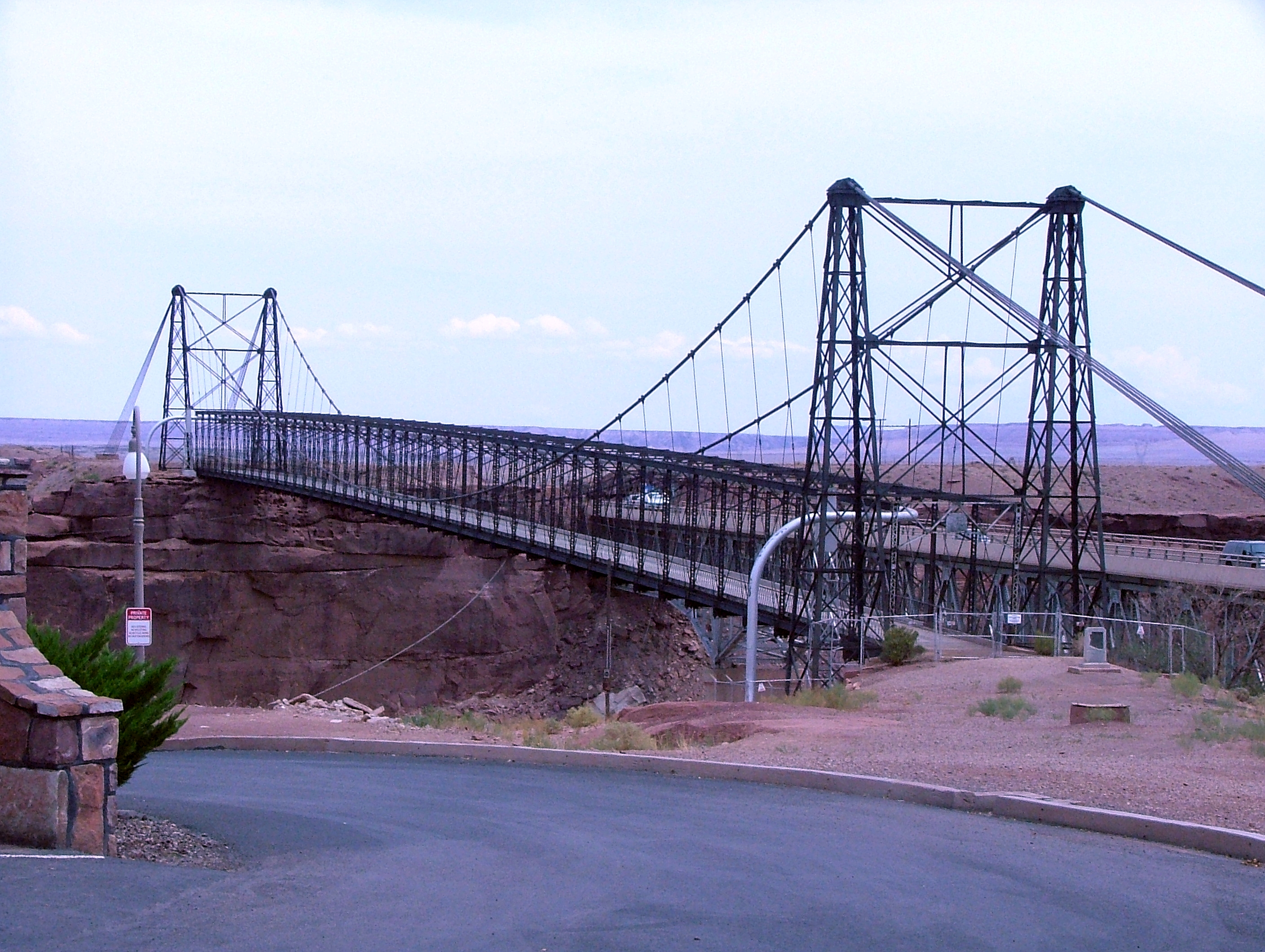
Bridge at Cameron, Arizona

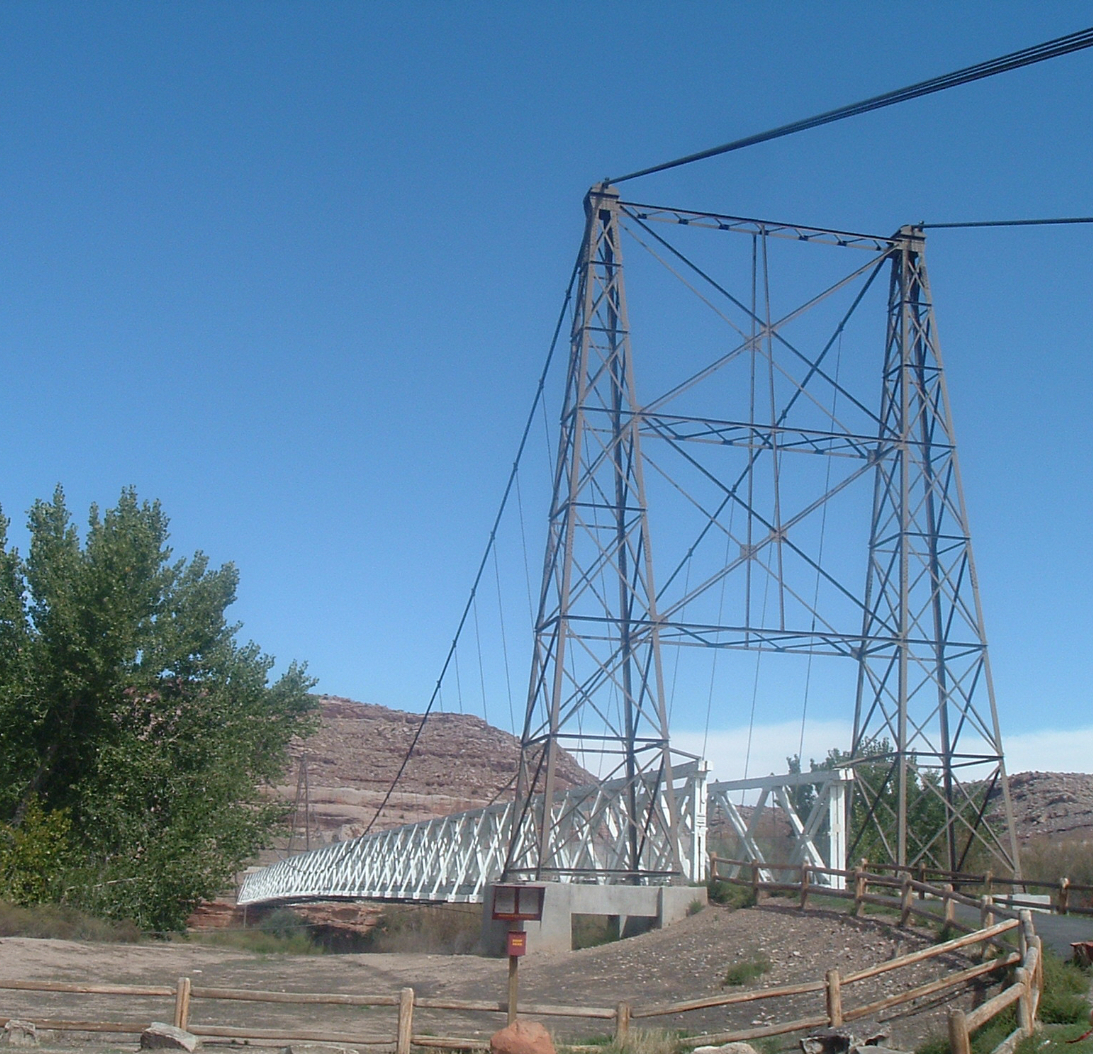
Dewey Bridge carried SR-128 across the Colorado River until its retirement in 1988

The Midland Bridge Company is a firm based in Kansas City, Missouri, United States, that has built numerous bridges. Several of its works are listed on the U.S. National Register of Historic Places (NRHP).

Works of the firm include:

- Dewey Bridge, built 1916, NE of Moab, Utah, carried Utah State Route 128 across the Colorado River. When completed, it was the second-longest suspension bridge west of the Mississippi River. Destroyed by fire in 2008, but still listed on the NRHP.
- Cameron Suspension Bridge, Cameron, Arizona, carries U.S. Route 89 across Little Colorado River, longest suspension bridge west of the Mississippi at the time of construction.
- Allentown Bridge, Indian Rt. 9402 over the Puerco River, milepost 9.1 Houck, Arizona, NRHP-listed
- Caddo Lake Bridge, LA 538, over Caddo Lake, Mooringsport, Louisiana, NRHP-listed
- Delaware River Parker Truss Bridge, Bridge St., 0.3 mi. W of int. with Main St. Perry, Kansas, NRHP-listed
- EJE Bridge over Shell Creek, Cty. Rd. CN9-57, Shell, Wyoming, NRHP-listed
- Green Bridge, 4100 Dripping Springs Rd., Las Cruces, New Mexico, NRHP-listed
- Hereford Bridge, Hereford Rd. over the San Pedro River, Hereford, Arizona, NRHP-listed
- Hurricane-LaVerkin Bridge, East of Utah State Route 9 over the Virgin River Hurricane, Utah, NRHP-listed
- Long Shoals Bridge, over Little Osage River, east of Fulton, Kansas, NRHP-listed
- Park Avenue Bridge, Park Ave. over the San Francisco River, Clifton, Arizona, NRHP-listed
