= Lincoln Highway Bridge (Dugway Proving Ground, Utah) =

- U.S. National Register of Historic Places
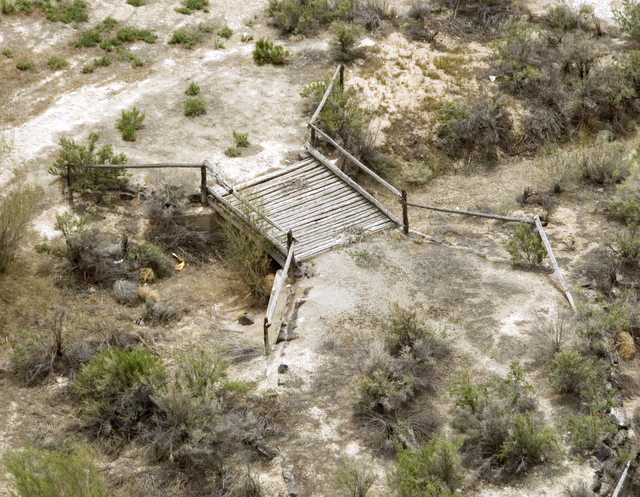
- Lincoln Highway Bridge, May 2008

- Location within Utah Location within the United States
- Location: In Dog Area on 2nd Street over Government Creek; Dugway Proving Ground, Utah; United States
- Coordinates: 40°10′58″N 112°55′23″W
- Area: less than one acre
- Built: 1900
- NRHP reference No.: 75001825
- Added to NRHP: May 21, 1975

Lincoln Highway Bridge, also known as Government Creek Bridge, is located in the Great Salt Lake Desert on the United States Army's Dugway Proving Ground in southern Tooele County, Utah, United States, that is listed on the National Register of Historic Places (NRHP). It once served an original proposed alignment of the Lincoln Highway, an historic transcontinental auto route.

== Description ==
When the bridge was surveyed for consideration for the NRHP, it was described as being constructed of "hewn logs and log supports." The survey notes abutments originally constructed of stone which were later reinforced by concrete as part of a Civilian Conservation Corps retrofit in the 1930s. The bridge measures 14.5 by 11.5 feet (4.4 m × 3.5 m) and was noted to be "in fairly good condition" upon completion of the survey in 1974.

== History ==
According to one source, sometime around the turn of the twentieth century, a road was constructed across what is now Dugway Proving Ground. In 1915, the Lincoln Highway Association (LHA) identified a road for incorporation into the highway's designated route between Salt Lake City, Utah and Ely, Nevada. Constructed by laborers from the Utah State Prison, the bridge has been identified as being a component of an early proposed alignment of that route. Despite the LHA's considerable lobbying, by 1922, Utah officials had abandoned the route in favor of a more northerly alignment via Wendover, Utah along the Wendover Cut-off. The bridge is claimed to be "the only significant structure in this area that remains of the original proposed national highway."

The structure was listed on the NRHP May 21, 1975.

== See also ==
- List of bridges on the National Register of Historic Places in Utah
- National Register of Historic Places in Tooele County, Utah
