= New Mexico Department of Cultural Affairs =

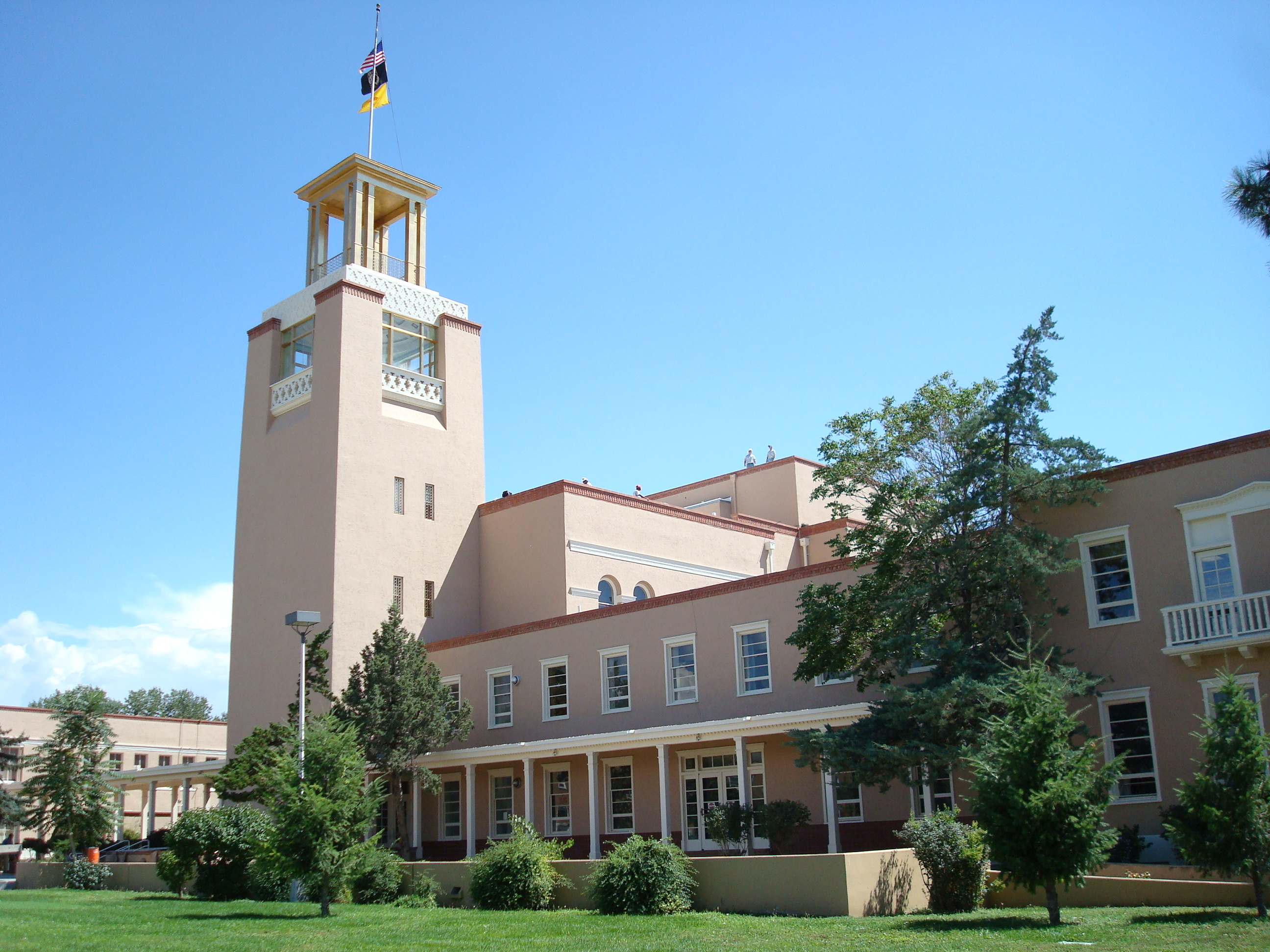
The Bataan Memorial Building houses the New Mexico Department of Cultural Affairs and other state agencies.

The New Mexico Department of Cultural Affairs is a state agency of the New Mexico government. Created as the Office of Cultural Affairs (OCA) in 1980, the New Mexico Department of Cultural Affairs was elevated to a state Cabinet-level agency in 2004. The department oversees the state museum, monument, art, library, heritage preservation, and archaeology programs.

The Department of Cultural Affairs is currently directed by Cabinet Secretary Debra Garcia y Griego, who was nominated by Governor Michelle Lujan Grisham on December 26, 2018. The Cabinet Secretary appoints all of the Directors of the divisions

== Divisions ==
- Museum Resources Division
- Administrative Services Division
- New Mexico Arts
- New Mexico Historic Preservation Division
- New Mexico State Library
- National Hispanic Cultural Center
- Museum of New Mexico
- New Mexico Museum of Space History
- Farm and Ranch Heritage Museum

== History ==
The Cultural Affairs Department Act was passed by the New Mexico Legislature in 2004 "to create a single, unified department to administer all laws and exercise all functions formerly administered and executed by the office of cultural affairs." Prior to the 2004 legislation, the various divisions of the Department of Cultural Affairs had been governed by the Office of Cultural Affairs, an agency within the Educational Finance and Cultural Affairs Department.
