= New Mexico Historic Preservation Division =

The New Mexico Historic Preservation Division is a division of the New Mexico Department of Cultural Affairs.

== Responsibilities ==
The division is responsible for the preservation of New Mexico's historical heritage. The division's activities include:

- Identifying and recording prehistoric and historic places, nominating them to the National Register of Historic Places and the State Register of Cultural Properties, and maintaining records of those places to be used for planning and research
- Administering tax-credit, low-interest loan, easement, and grant programs to provide preservation incentives
- Providing preservation-related technical assistance to agencies, local governments, and private owners
- Administering preservation laws and assisting other agencies and local governments in developing preservation regulations and ordinances
- Developing educational programs about New Mexico's past and about the value of preserving our heritage
