= New Mexico Farm and Ranch Heritage Museum =

Interactive museum in Las Cruces, New Mexico

Coordinates: 32°17′50″N 106°43′09″W

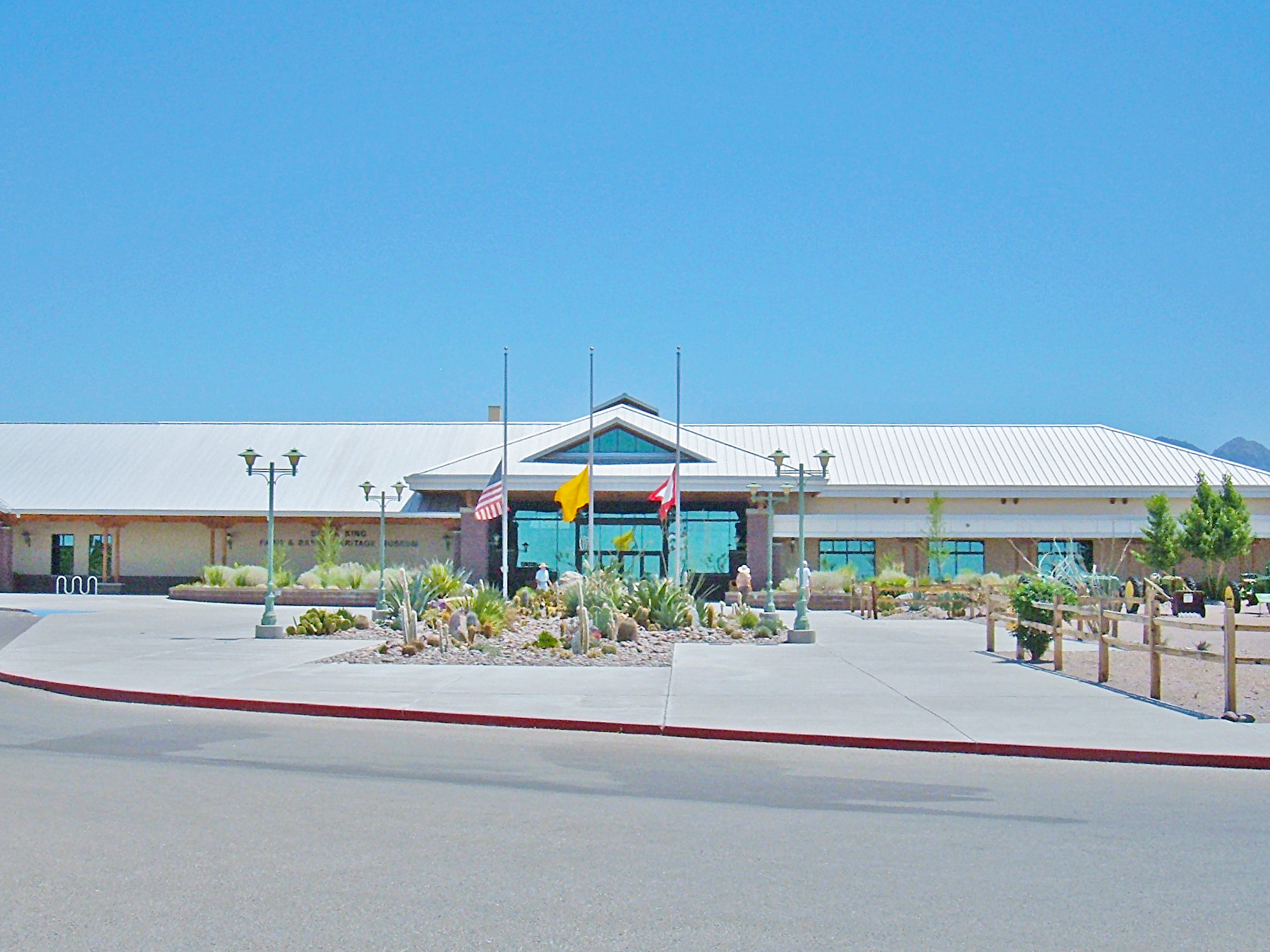
- Museum main building
- Established: 1991
- Location: Las Cruces, New Mexico, U.S.
- Owner: New Mexico Department of Cultural Affairs

The New Mexico Farm and Ranch Heritage Museum is a 47-acre (190,000 m^{2}) interactive museum in Las Cruces, New Mexico, that chronicles the state’s 3,000-year history of farming and ranching. The museum is part of the New Mexico Department of Cultural Affairs.

== History ==
The idea for the museum was conceived in the 1970s and the grassroots effort to create the facility was led by William P. Stephens, the former secretary of the New Mexico Department of Agriculture, and Gerald Thomas, the former president of New Mexico State University. The passage of the Farm and Ranch Heritage Museum Act in 1991 by the New Mexico Legislature established the museum and its policy-making board. Ground was broken in 1995 and the museum opened to the public in 1998.

== Facility ==
The museum is located at 4100 Dripping Springs Road on the southeastern edge of Las Cruces, New Mexico. The Bruce King Building features six different galleries and corridors that display permanent and changing exhibits, including historic tools and implements, as well as recreated structures such as a mercantile and pithouse. The museum exhibits a variety of fine art including a lithograph collection from contemporary artist Robert "Shoofly" Shufelt, who was the first artist ever displayed. The main building includes the Eagle Ranch Museum Mercantile and Snack Bar, as well as a theater and catering operation.

The museum property includes the historic Green Bridge, which is listed on the National Register of Historic Places. The bridge spans the dry Tortugas Arroyo, and was obtained and moved by the museum to this location in 2007.

The museum also features the Skaggs Dairy Barn, Blacksmith Shop, Horse & Cattle Barn, the Sheep & Goat Barn, the Greenhouse, and livestock, including cattle, horses, sheep, and goats.

== Programs ==
The museum’s education department offers a variety of classes and workshops for all ages and oversees the outreach activities, including the chuck wagon program. There also are monthly lectures and special presentations in the theater. Among the annual events are Cowboy Days on the first weekend of March, Ice Cream Sunday on the third Sunday in July, and HomeGrown: A New Mexico Food Show & Gift Market on the weekend before Thanksgiving.

== See also ==
- Open-air museum
