= Murphy Trail and Bridge =

- U.S. National Register of Historic Places
- U.S. Historic district
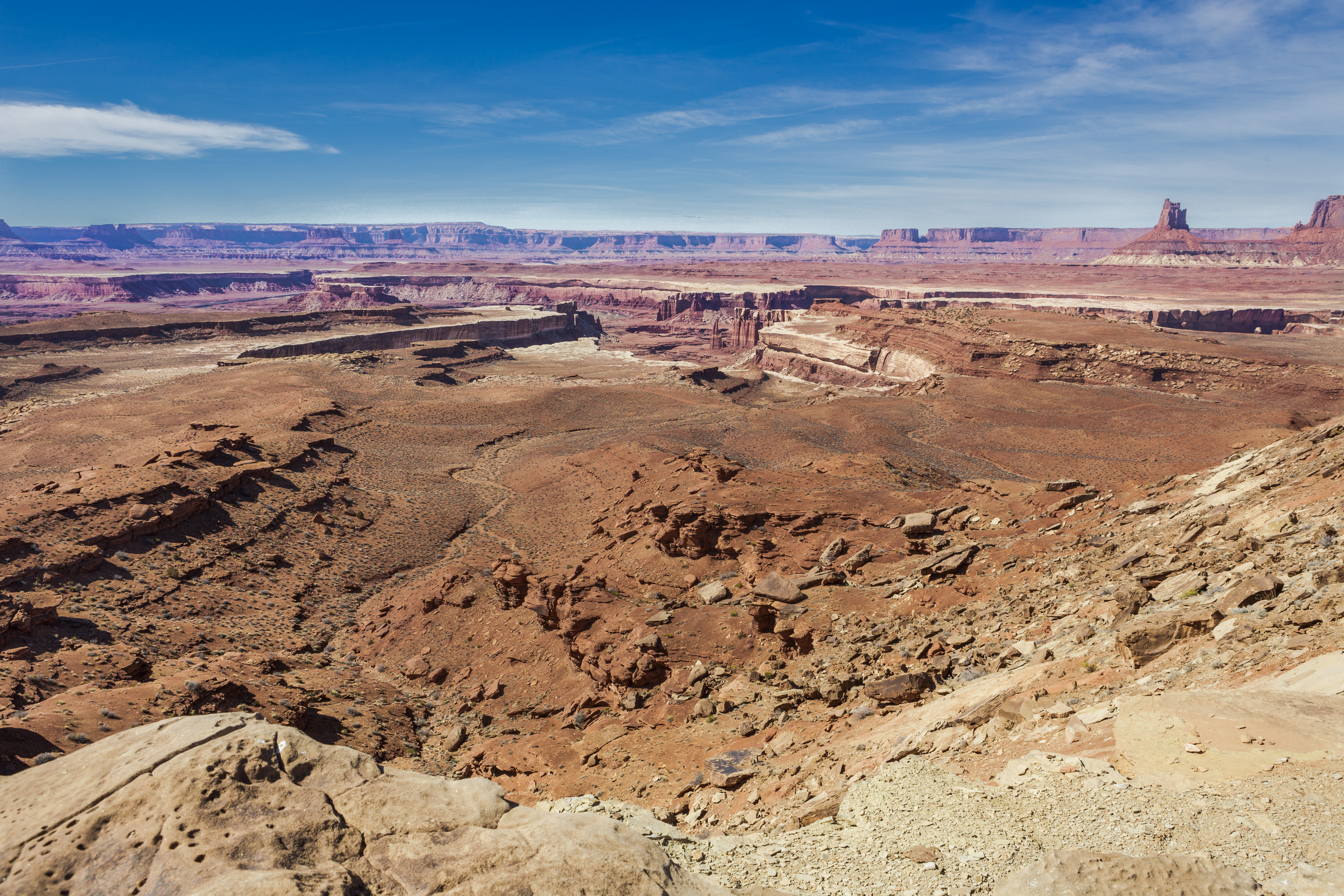
- Murphy Trail, March 2013

- Location within Utah Location within the United States
- Nearest city: Moab, Utah
- Coordinates: 38°20′37″N 109°52′15″W
- Built: 1917
- Architect: Idiart, J.; Allies, D.
- MPS: Canyonlands National Park MRA
- NRHP reference No.: 88001236
- Added to NRHP: October 07, 1988

The Murphy Trail and Bridge in San Juan County, Utah, United States, were used to move livestock from winter range along the Green River to highland summer range from about 1917 to about 1964. The trail and bridge are located in what is now Canyonlands National Park and the trail is now used as a hiking path. The bridge was made from logs and rough-cut planking, and was built around 1917 by J. Idiart and D. Allies. The 10-foot-long (3.0 m) bridge was reconstructed in 1998 and no longer retains historic integrity.

== See also ==
- List of bridges on the National Register of Historic Places in Utah
- National Register of Historic Places listings in Grand County, Utah
- Dewey Bridge Member – a type of Entrada Sandstone named for the Dewey Bridge
