= Sarto Bridge =

- U.S. National Register of Historic Places
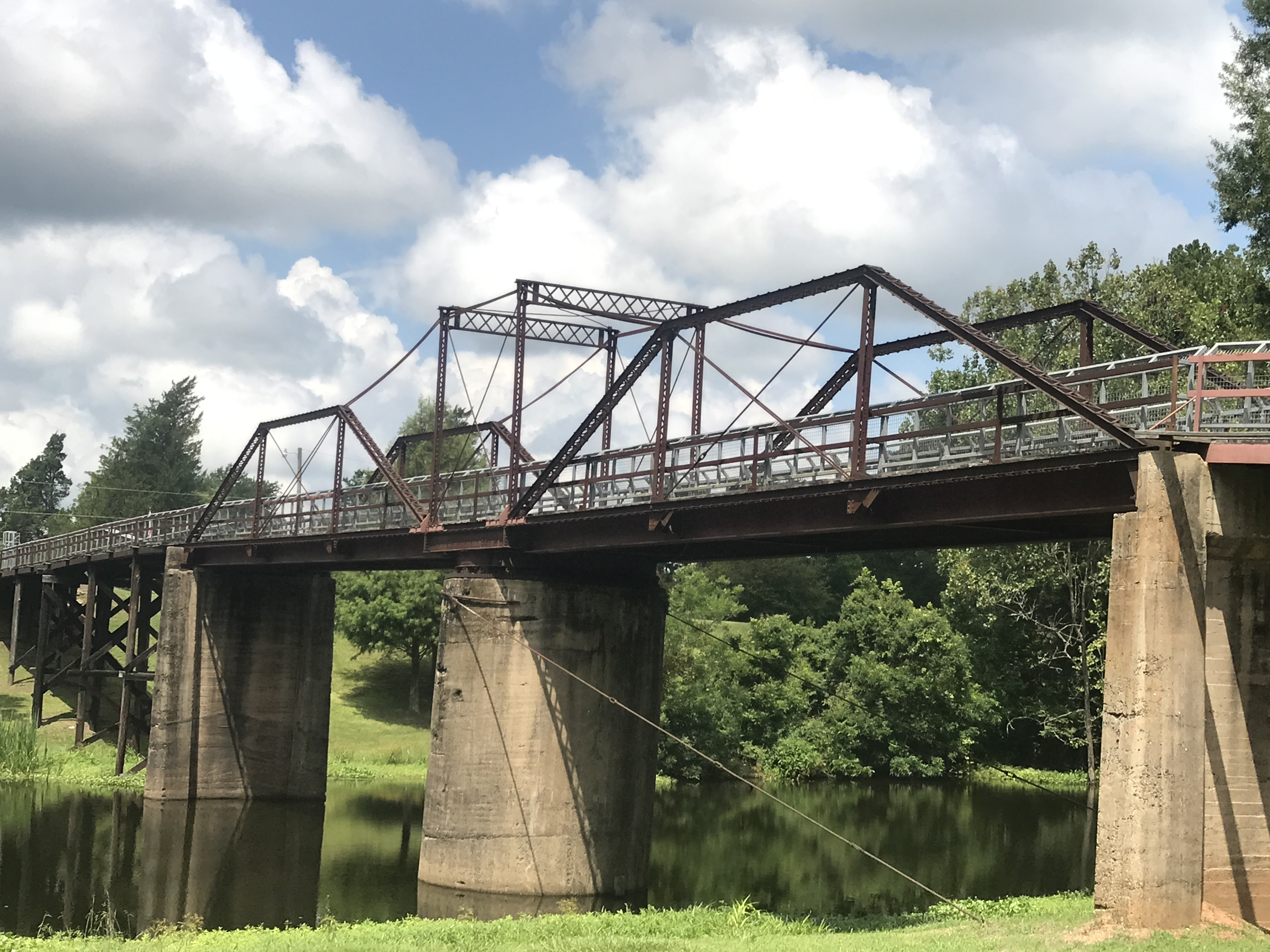

- Location within Louisiana
- Location: Off LA 451 over Bayou Des Glaises, Big Bend, Louisiana
- Coordinates: 31°04′26″N 91°47′33″W
- Area: 1 acre (0.40 ha)
- Built: 1916
- Built by: Austin Brothers (of Texas)
- Architectural style: Swing truss bridge
- NRHP reference No.: 89002027
- Added to NRHP: November 21, 1989

The Sarto Bridge is a swing truss bridge built in 1916 over the Bayou Des Glaises at Big Bend in Avoyelles Parish, Louisiana. It is also known as the Sarto Old Iron Bridge.

It was the first bridge in Louisiana to be placed on the National Register of Historic Places, which occurred in 1989. Its swing mechanism was no longer operable, having essentially not been used since the waterway was deemed unnavigable in 1930, but it was determined that "the bridge still exemplifies its type and hence retains its National Register eligibility."

It played a role in evacuation of Big Bend during the Great Mississippi Flood of 1927.

It is located in the Atchafalaya National Heritage Area off Louisiana Highway 451, and now brings the Atchafalaya Water Heritage Trail over the Bayou des Glaises.
