= Robert "Shoofly" Shufelt =

American artist (born 1935)

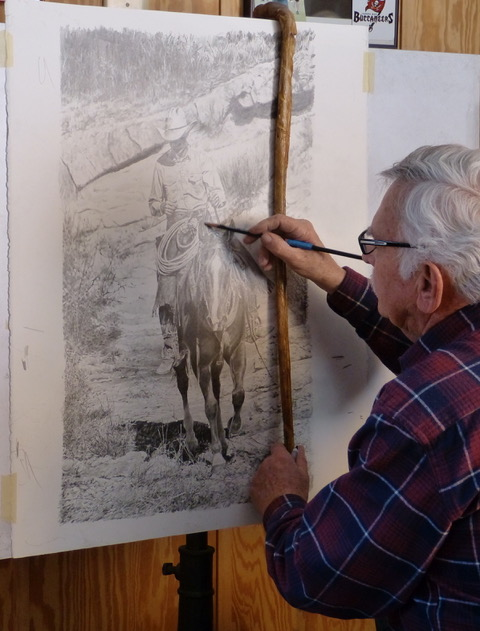
- Shufelt in his studio
- Born: February 16, 1935 (age 91); Champaign, Illinois, U.S.
- Other names: Shoofly
- Education: School of the Art Institute of Chicago Lake Forest College, The University of Illinois
- Occupation: Artist
- Years active: 1976–present
- Known for: American Cowboy art
- Awards: The Great American Cowboy Award (2005) Artist of the Year (2007)

Robert "Shoofly" Shufelt (born February 16, 1935) is an American artist who is primarily known for his depiction of the modern-day cowboy and Ranch lifestyle in the Southwest. Originally from Illinois, he attended art school and worked in illustration before moving to a cattle ranch near Wickenburg, Arizona. As of 1991, he lives in New Mexico.

== Career ==
Shufelt's Pencil graphite drawings capture ranching culture which is absorbed in the cowboy way. Some drawings have been published by the artist in small editions of stone, offset or digital issues.

In 2014 he was awarded the New Mexico Governor's Awards for Excellence in the Arts alongside author George R. R. Martin.

Shufelt's artwork has been represented in galleries in Scottsdale, Arizona; Jackson, Wyoming; and Tucson, Arizona. His art has been exhibited in museums across the United States including the Desert Caballeros Western Museum; the Tucson Art Museum; the Colorado Springs Fine Arts Center; the New Mexico Farm and Ranch Heritage Museum; and the National Cowboy and Western Heritage Museum.
