= Burr's Ferry Bridge =

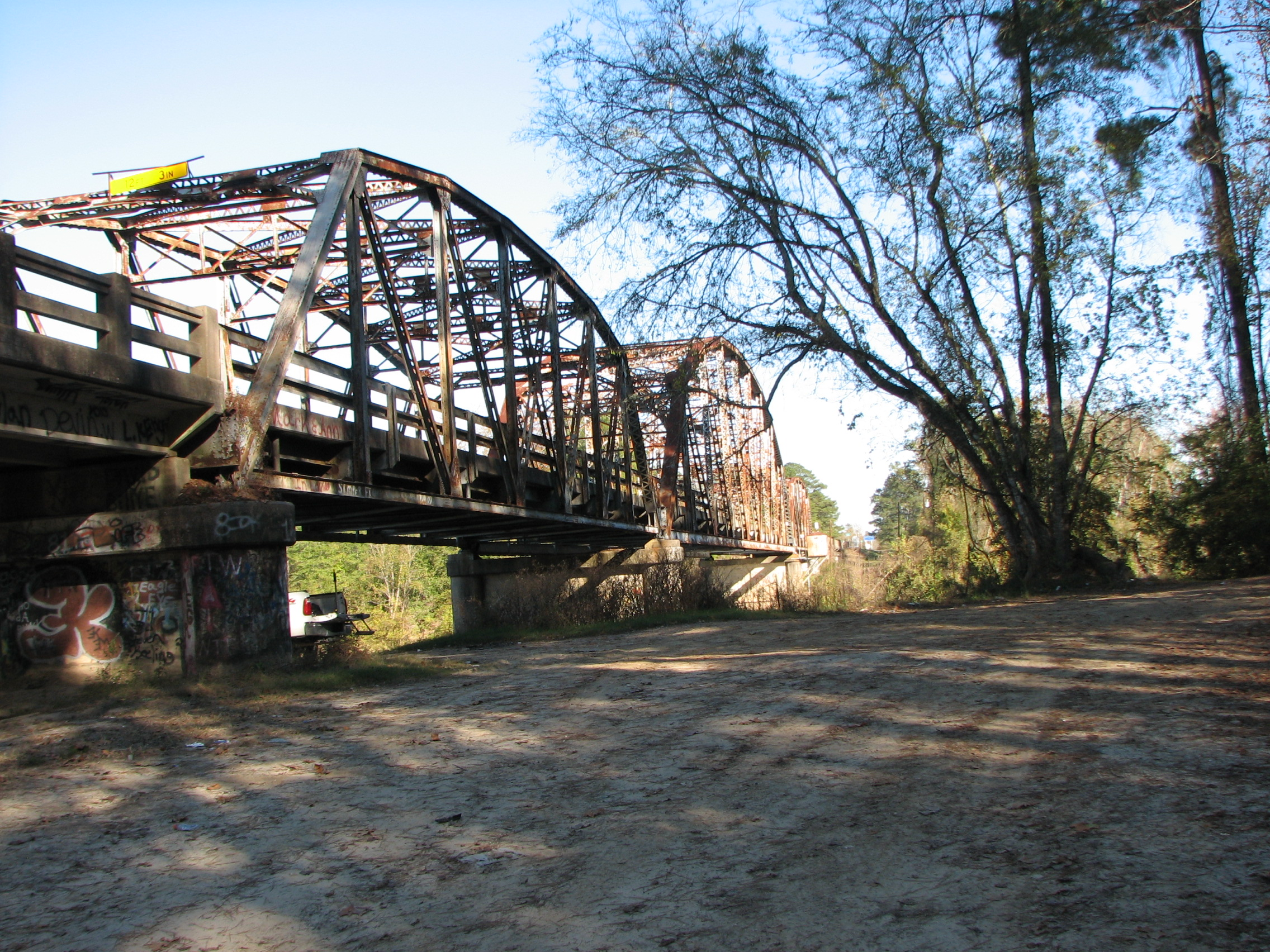
- Coordinates: 31°03′50″N 93°31′23″W
- Carries: SH 63 / LA 8 (2 lanes east and west)
- Crosses: Sabine River
- Locale: Between Burkeville, Texas, and Burr Ferry, Louisiana
- Maintained by: Louisiana DOTD, TxDOT
- ID number: NW0214-04-005 (Texas)

Characteristics
- Design: Parker through truss bridge
- Longest span: 250 feet (76 m)
- Clearance above: 12 feet 8 inches (4 m)

History
- Designer: Louisiana Highway Commission
- Constructed by: W. Horace Williams Company
- Construction start: 1936
- Construction end: 1937
- Burr's Ferry Bridge
- U.S. National Register of Historic Places
- Area: 1.1 acres (0.45 ha)
- NRHP reference No.: 98000562; 98000563
- Added to NRHP: May 18, 1998

Burr's Ferry Bridge is a bridge on the Sabine River, where Louisiana State Highway 8 (LA 8) meets Texas State Highway 63 (SH 63) at the Louisiana/Texas state border between Burkeville, Texas, and Burr Ferry, Louisiana.

The bridge includes three Parker through truss spans and 34 concrete girder spans. The center span is a 250-foot (76 m) riveted Parker through truss; the other two main spans are 120 feet (37 m) in length.

Currently, the Texas Department of Transportation (TxDOT) and Louisiana Department of Transportation and Development (LaDOTD) are working to replace the two-lane Burr's Ferry Bridge with a new bridge that will be built to interstate-highway standards bridge about a quarter mile to the south of the existing bridge. The new bridge will be for the Interstate 14 extension. The construction of the replacement bridge is expected to start in summer 2025.

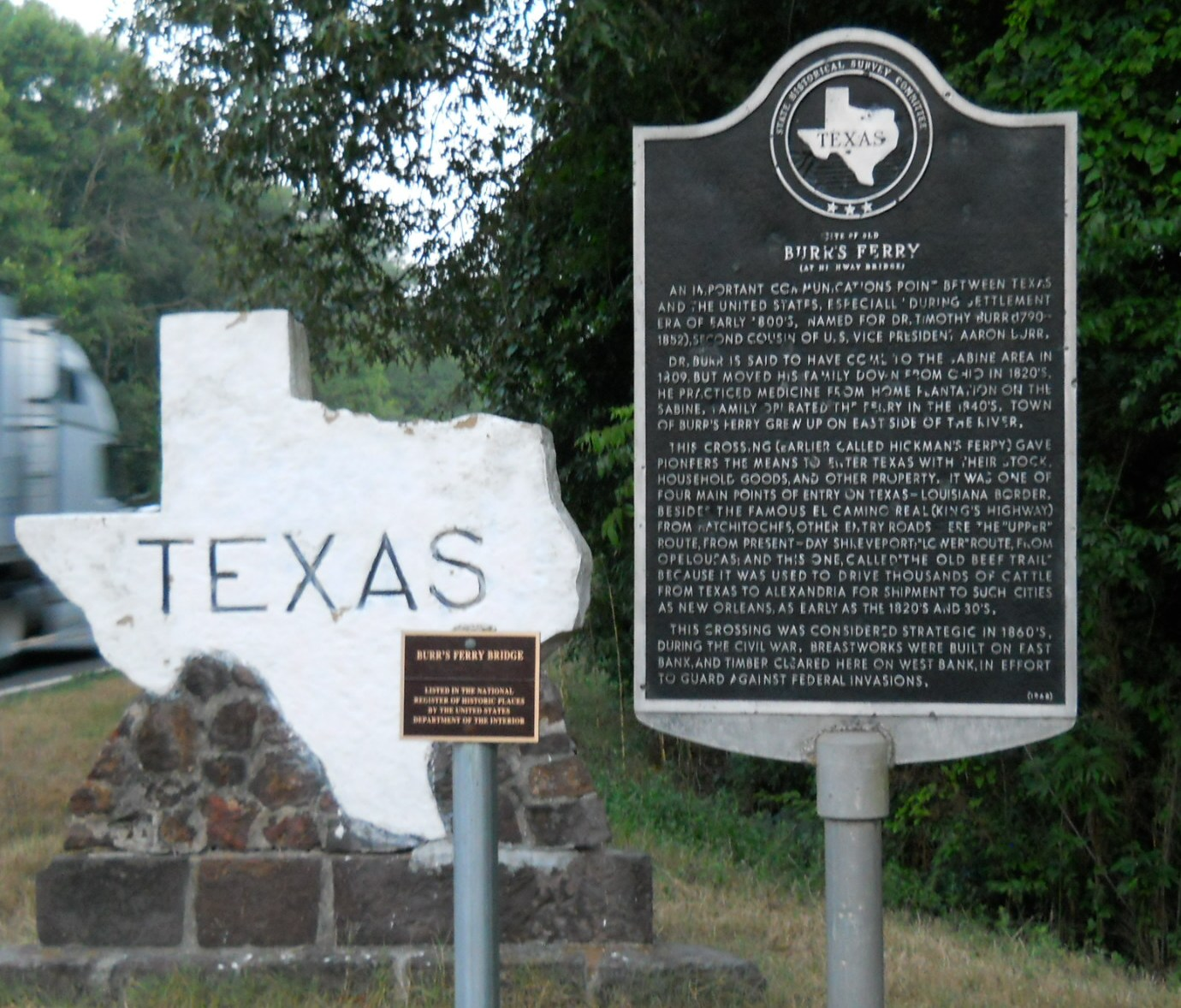

== See also ==
- National Register of Historic Places listings in Calcasieu Parish, Louisiana
- National Register of Historic Places listings in Newton County, Texas
