= Burr Ferry, Louisiana =

Burr Ferry
- Unincorporated community
- Hamlet of Burr Ferry
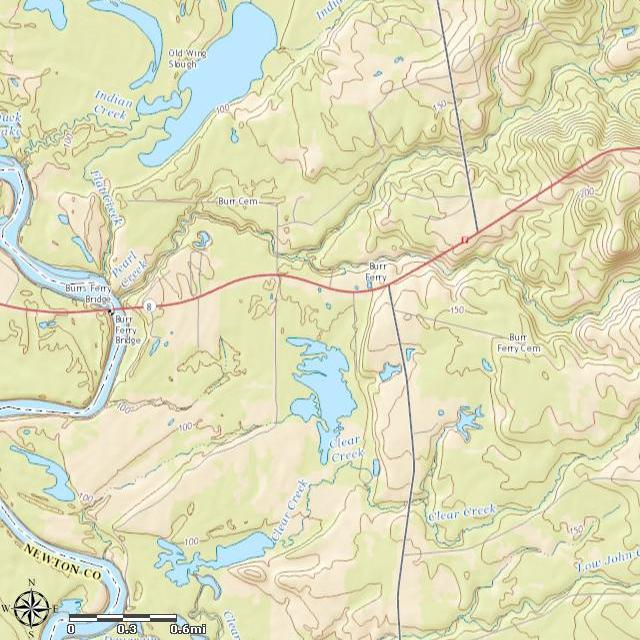
- Topography of Burr Ferry

- Location within Louisiana
- Coordinates: 31°03′59″N 93°29′46″W
- Country: United States
- State: Louisiana
- Parish: Vernon
- Elevation: 128 ft (39 m)
- Time zone: UTC-6 (Central (CST))
  - Summer (DST): UTC-5 (CDT)
- GNIS feature ID: 545310

Burr Ferry is an unincorporated community at the junction of LA 8 and LA 111 south, in Vernon Parish, Louisiana, United States. The community is two miles from the site of the old Burr's Ferry on the Sabine River, at the Texas line. The Sabine River, at this location, is the site of two listings on the National Register of Historic Places: Burr's Ferry Bridge and Burr's Ferry Earthworks.

== Nolan Trace ==
LA 8 is referred to as the Nolan Trace after adventurer Philip Nolan, who traveled the road to Texas and back many times. Nolan took one last trip through Burr Ferry in 1801. This ill-fated trip ended in east Texas with his death, at the hands of the Royal Spanish army, and the capture of his expedition, numbered to be around 20. Peter Ellis Bean was among the group captured and wrote about it later.

Dr. Timothy Burr settled with his family in the area circa 1820. His grandfather was Timothy Burr of Fairfield, Connecticut.

== History ==
The exact year Dr. Burr traveled to the area from Ohio, listed as 1809, could be questioned but records indicate that he did not travel alone. On the second trip, in the early 1820s, he also brought other people along with his family. Upon arrival they were not the only ones in the area and in fact the ferry was reflected in early records as "Hickman's Ferry" but later named Burr's Ferry.

=== No Man's Land ===
The area that Dr. Burr came to the first time and settled in the second was part of a stretch of land that was a disputed boundary between two countries. After the Louisiana Purchase in 1803 the western border was not clear and thus disputed. This dispute actually involved four countries, France, New Spain, Mexico, and the United States over many years. The years of lawlessness actually lasted into the late 19th century when Texas was a Republic.

The countries of Spain and the United States did not want to go to war over a border dispute. From 1805 when Spain severed diplomatic relations with the U.S. there was continual skirmishing. Under a peace agreement signed by an officer of the United States, General James Wilkinson, and a Spanish officer, Lt. Col. Sim'on de Herrera November 5, 1806. Both sides were to remove troops from the area of a neutral strip of land bringing an end to three years of verbal and military conflict between the two governments.

Neutral Ground

- This area was referred to as the Neutral Ground, and called the Neutral Strip, the Neutral territory, or the No Man's Land of Louisiana. The area of land included present day Vernon Parish with the Sabine River being the western boundary. The Arroyo Hondo was the eastern border.

There was also to be no settlers but obviously this was disregarded. With no troops or law the area became generally known as the Bad Lands and was a haven for privateers or anyone running from the law. Two separate times the government of both countries sent a joint expedition to the area to restore order. The Adams–Onís Treaty of 1819 settled the boundary dispute between the two countries but it was not ratified until 1921. This did not end the lawlessness that actually lasted until the 1840s. The Regulator-Moderator War (1839–1844) began from the area of the Neutral Strip and spread into Texas.

=== Ferries ===
There were many types of ferries in the early 19th century but a common type was a flat top ferry that used cables to span a waterway. The ferry could be pulled across using the cables. The ferry would have a rope(s) or cable(s) stretched around it as an enclosure. This allowed the movement of many things, including large wagons and animals, across a waterway. This was the type used in Burr Ferry. Part of the cable system can still be seen at the site as well as the slope leading to the ferry landing. Living on the Sabine River, on a major trail, a ferry was a natural business with what could be a lucrative income.

Burr's Ferry' was listed in records to have been "Hickman's Ferry". In 1847 the name was changed. It is not known if a Mr. Hickman was already in the area, came to the area with Dr. Burr, or if Dr. Burr or one of his sons bought a ferry that was in operation.

It was a cable ferry and the ferry cables were designed so they could be lowered allowing boats to navigate past and raised again to resume crossing. No known pictures exist of Burr's Ferry but it might have looked like one in Gee's Bend, Alabama.

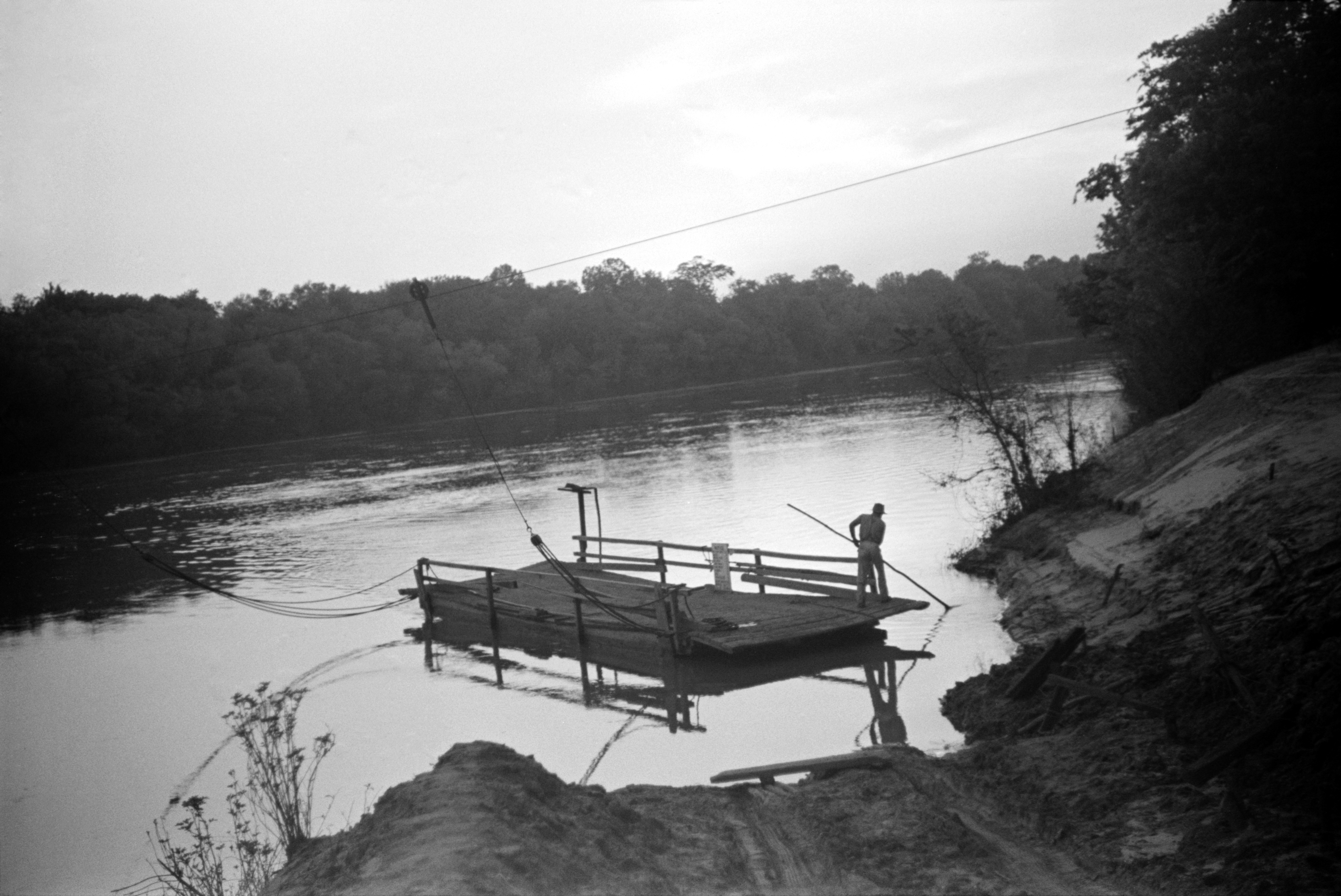
Simple cable ferry, Gee's Bend, Alabama, 1939

A ferry was operated until the Burr's Ferry Bridge was built in 1937.

=== Life in Burr Ferry ===
Doctor Timothy Burr built a house for his family on the mouth of Pearl Creek. He practiced medicine, and owned a store, a bar, a ferry, and other businesses. His location was not only on a major travel route but also a major cattle drive route to Alexandria. This route just happened to be located near the middle of "No man's land" and on one of only four river crossings between Texas and Louisiana. Dr. Burr's patients would have been not only those around the community but those of questionable reputation. Considering that Highwaymen were very active for many years Dr. Burr and the residents of Burr Ferry would have had to have been respected, needed, or both to cohabitate in such an area.

Not long after Dr. Burr settled in Burr Ferry Captain John M. Liles also arrived from North Carolina. He reportedly married a girl from the Winfree family that already lived in the area. Along with the Liles came the Jonathan D. Cain family. How or when Dr. Burr and Captain Liles met is not clear but they were associates.

=== Civil War ===
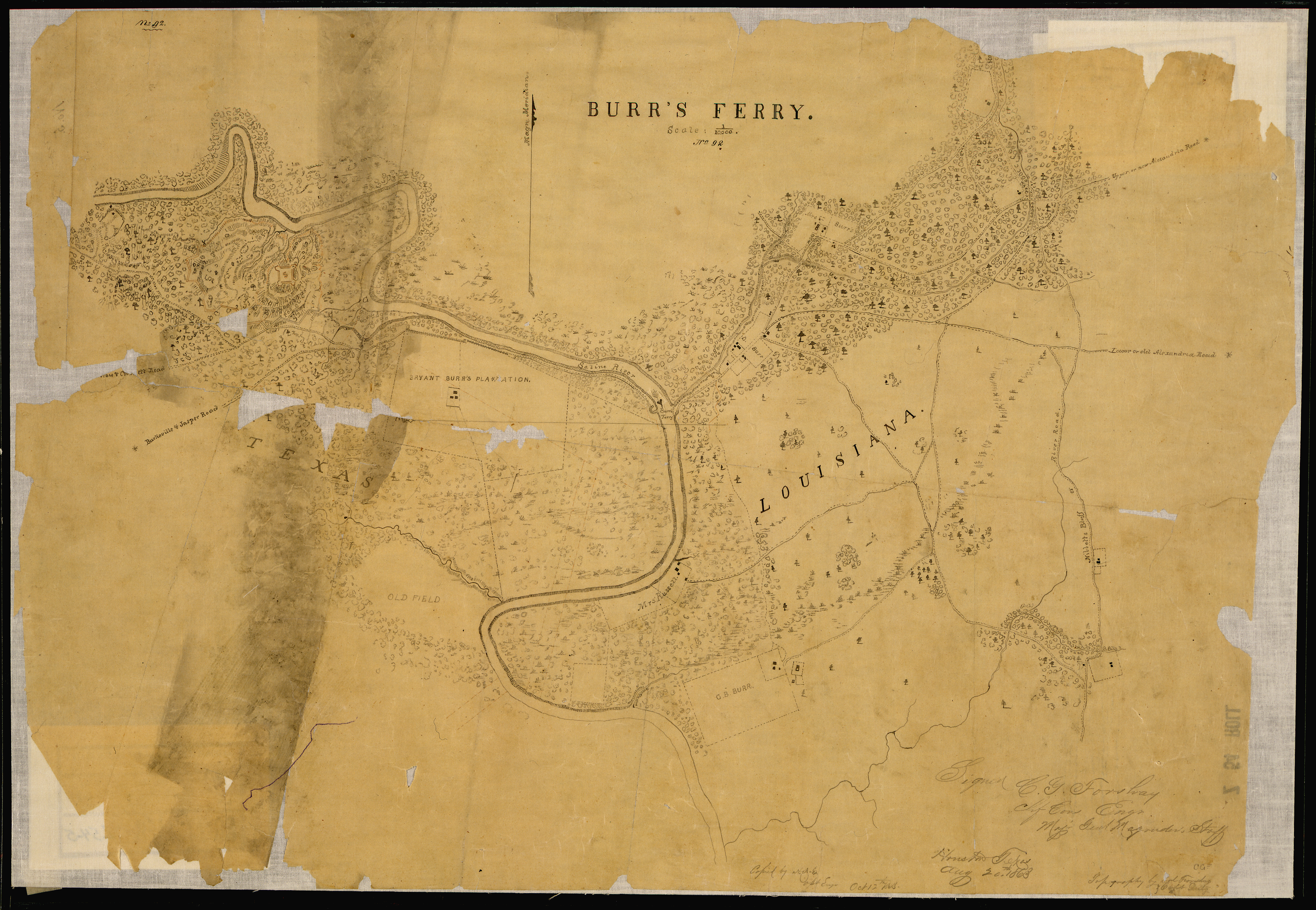
Map of Burr's Ferry and vicinity, 1863

After the American Civil War broke out, Natchez, Mississippi fell to the Union Army and Alexandria was burned. The Confederates feared that the crossing at Burr's Ferry would be attacked. Trenches and breast works were constructed at Burr's Ferry under the leadership of H. W. Scoggins, Sr. There were no battles fought in Burr's Ferry but the breast works are still visible today.

=== Life after war ===
After the war, John Liles had earned enough money to buy a steamboat to travel up and down the Sabine River from Logansport to the Gulf of Mexico. Over time there were several others. The first steamboat was "The New Era". The "Ernie" owned by Captain G. B. Burr (1875), the "Bertha" (1876), and the "Extra" (1876). The "Lamar" (1886) was owned by Captain Walter Caraway. In 1888 Captain John Liles owned the "Cura". The "Ada" owned by Captain Davis, a tug called "Fannie" owned by Captain Lou Bettis, and a stave boat called "Godwin" owned by Captain Godwin in 1911. The "Neches Belle" was owned by Captain S. G. Allardyce and John Liles.

=== Post Office ===
The first Post office was established July 1, 1873, with John M. Liles as postmaster. On March 5, 1892, while James Cavanaugh was in charge of the office, the name was changed to Burr Ferry. The office was discontinued November 30, 1918, re-established for a few months in 1922; then re-established March 29, 1929. It was finally discontinued July 31, 1933.

== Vernon Parish ==
History of Vernon Parish (founded March 30, 1871) reflects that Dr. Burr was an early settler to the area and possibly one of the first doctors. Located about 17 miles west of the much later parish seat at Leesville,

There are four theories as to the naming of the parish. One states the parish was named after Mount Vernon which was the home of President George Washington. All appear to be of some speculation. The Greater Vernon Chamber of Commerce list on the official web site, in the history section, that the parish was named after the home of George Washington.

There is one theory, with historical ties, that the parish was named after the Ohio hometown of Dr. Burr which was named Mount Vernon also. This town was established in 1805, in what became Knox County, organized in 1808. This is approximately 45 miles northeast of Columbus, was a major travel route in the 19th century, and only 5 miles from Gambier, the home of Kenyon College. This college was founded in 1824 and probably after Dr. Burr would have headed back to Louisiana on his second trip.

== Leesville ==
Leesville was designated the Parish seat when the parish was created by an act of the Louisiana legislature in 1871.

== Current ==
The community now only consists of two churches, a store, and a few residents.

== Texas ==
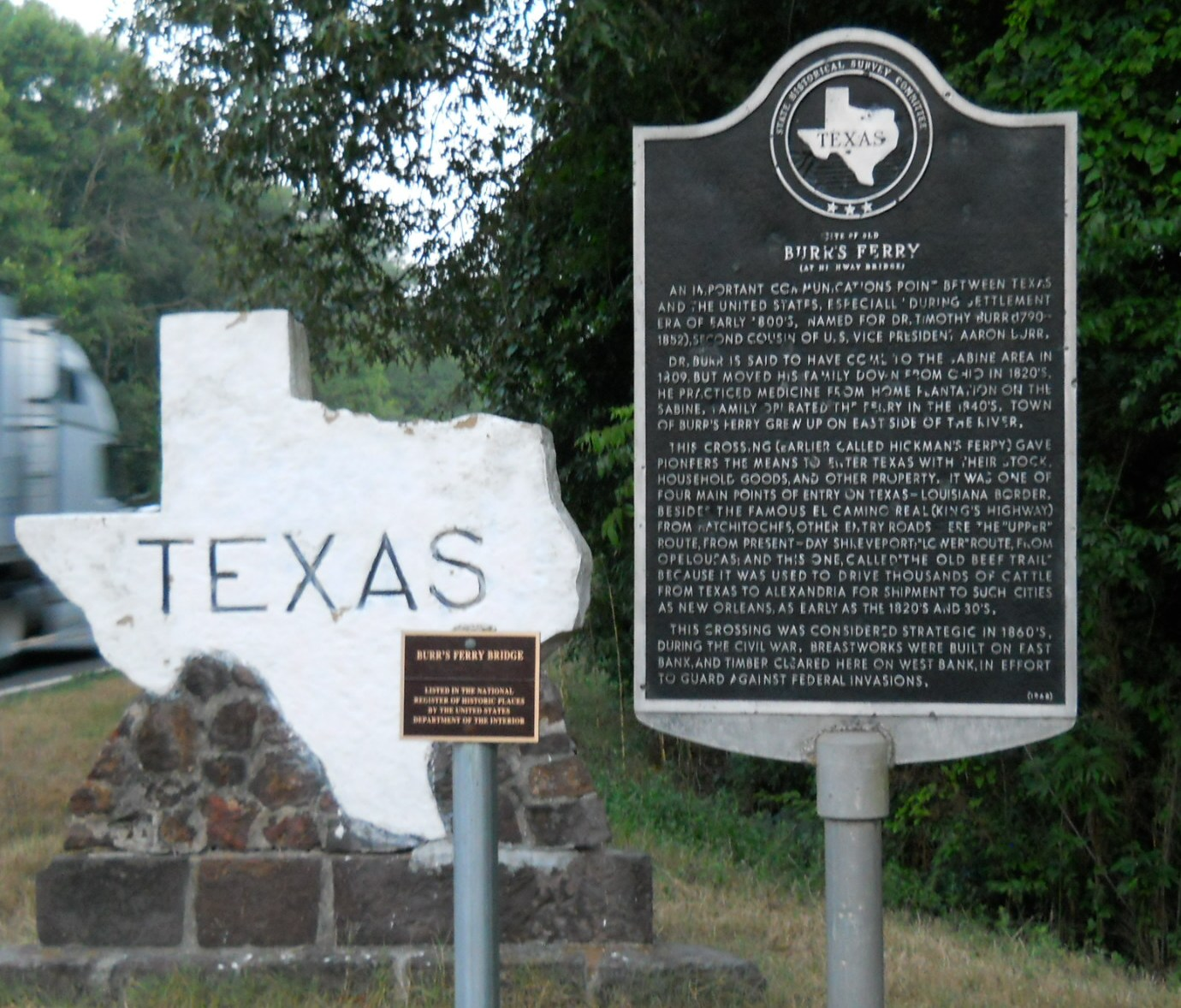
Burr's Ferry State historical marker

The State of Texas, at the beginning of the 19th century, was owned by Spain. The landing on the Texas side was where four trails merged before crossing the river into Louisiana. The major cattle trail to Alexandria and three Indian trails. The Coushatta Trace and the Coushatta-Nacogdoches Trace were two such trails.

=== Texas State Marker ===
The Texas Official State Marker at the site of Burr's Ferry on the Sabine River has this inscription:

- "Site of Old Burr's Ferry (Highway Bridge) An important communications point between Texas and the United States, Especially during settlement era of early 1800s. Named for Dr. Timothy Burr (1790–1852), second cousin of U.S. Vice President Aaron Burr".

== Sources ==
- http://dscholar.humboldt.edu:8080/dspace/bitstream/2148/398/1/Ilza%20Hakenen%20Thesis.pdf
- http://Vernonparishhistory.com
- https://tshaonline.org

== Other information ==
- Louisiana maps
