= Zion – Mount Carmel Highway =

- U.S. National Register of Historic Places
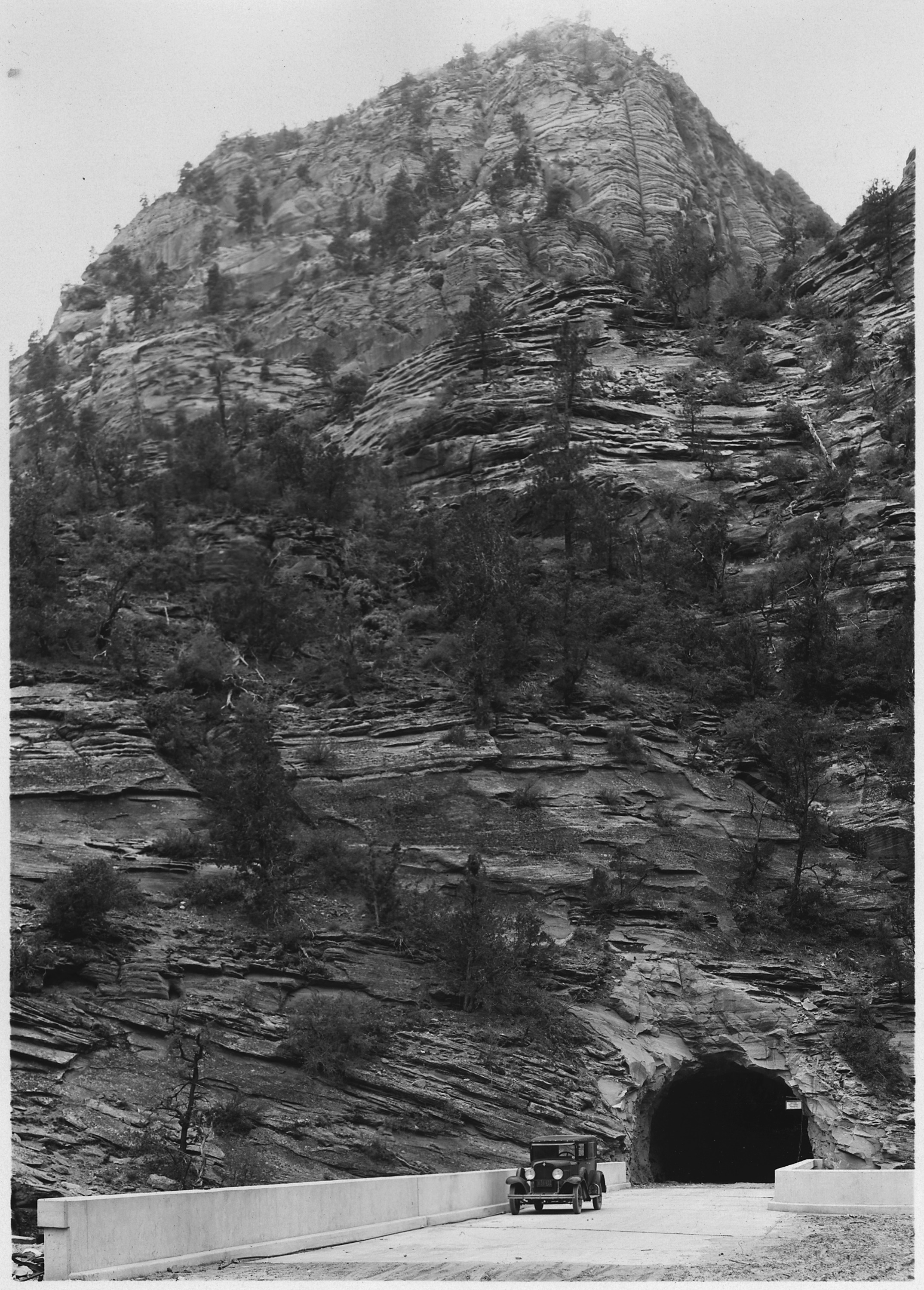
- The east portal of the Zion-Mt. Carmel Tunnel, September 1929

- Location within Utah Location within the United States
- Location: Between South Entrance of Zion National Park (on the border with Springdale
- Nearest city: Springdale
- Coordinates: 37°13′19″N 112°55′58″W
- Built: 1930
- Architect: MacDonald, Thomas; et al.
- MPS: Zion National Park MRA
- NRHP reference No.: 86003709
- Added to NRHP: July 07, 1987

The Zion – Mount Carmel Highway is a 25-mile (40 km) long road in Washington and Kane counties in southern Utah that is listed on the National Register of Historic Places and is a National Historic Civil Engineering Landmark.

== Description ==
The highway consists of the eastern half of Utah State Route 9. It begins northeast of Springdale and runs east into Zion National Park, where it passes through the 1.1 miles (1.8 km) long Zion-Mount Carmel Tunnel. After exiting the park, the highway continues east to U.S. Route 89 at Mount Carmel Junction. The road became part of a loop tour of Zion, Bryce Canyon National Park, Cedar Breaks National Monument, and the North Rim of Grand Canyon National Park.

== Design and construction ==
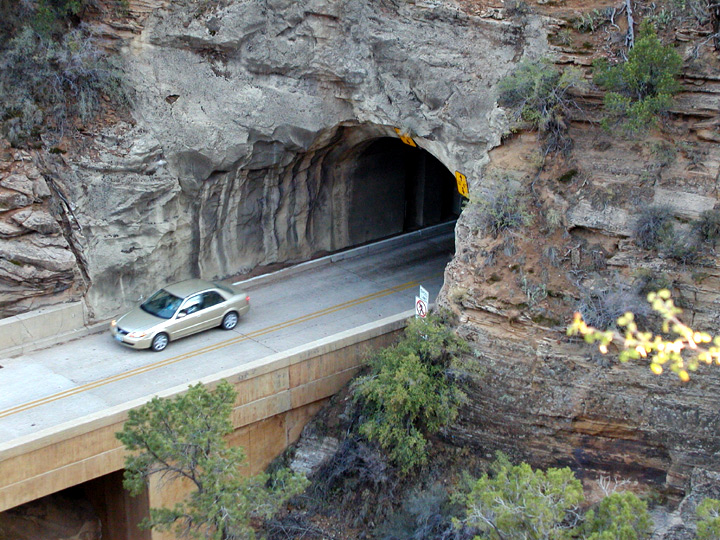
West end of the Pine Creek Bridge and the east portal of the Zion-Mt. Carmel Tunnel, c. 2006

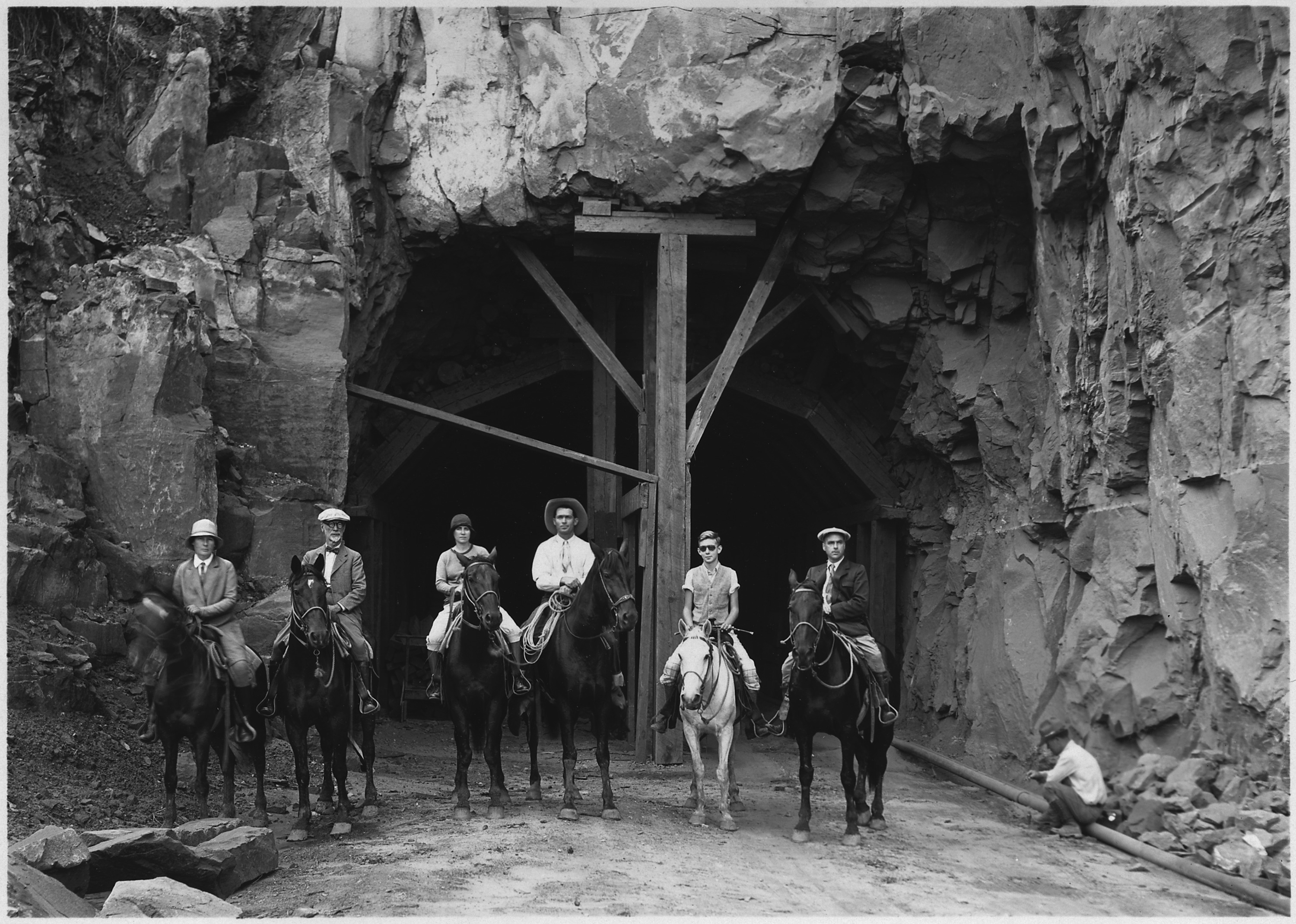
A horseback party at the western entrance to the Zion-Mt. Carmel Tunnel, September 1929. The tunnel shortened the distance from Zion National Park to Bryce Canyon National Park by 70 miles (110 km).

The route was surveyed in 1923 by B.J. Finch, district engineer of the US Bureau of Public Roads, Howard C. Means, a Utah state engineer, and John Winder, a local rancher. The National Park Service evaluated alternative routes, including one that used Parunuweap Canyon (following the East Fork Virgin River), but settled on the Pine Creek route, which required a tunnel through the Great Arch. Detailed design work on the road was carried out by the Bureau of Public Roads. Details including bridges, retaining walls, culverts, and other features were designed by the National Park Service Branch of Plans and Design under the supervision of Thomas Chalmers Vint. Work began in 1927 on a total of 25 miles (40 km) of road, which was completed in 1930.

The highway features a 5,613-foot (1,711 m) tunnel that follows the profile of the Pine Creek Canyon wall at a consistent distance of 21 feet (6.4 m) from the outside face of the rock to the centerline of the tunnel. The west portal is framed by a masonry façade of cut sandstone, while the east portal is a naturalistically formed hole in the rock, entered directly from a bridge. Construction proceeded using mining techniques rather than traditional tunneling techniques, starting from a stope and working outward to the portals. The tunnel uses galleries to provide light and ventilation through the canyon wall to the outside air. The galleries also provided a place to dispose of rock generated during construction, which was dumped through the galleries into the canyon. Parking spaces were originally provided at the galleries, but were discontinued due to safety concerns. Some galleries have been repaired and partially closed with concrete due to damage from rockslides. The interior of the tunnel is rock-faced, with concrete reinforcement at selected locations.

Work on the tunnel was started in 1927 by the Nevada Construction Company and was completed in 1930 at a cost of $503,000 (equivalent to $10.61 million in 2025). At the time of its completion it was the longest non-urban road tunnel in the United States. The tunnel's restricted dimensions require that vehicles over 11.33 feet (3.45 m) in height or 7.83 feet (2.39 m) in width give advance notice so that two-way traffic can be shut down in the tunnel, allowing oversize vehicles to proceed down the center of the tunnel. Vehicles over 13.08 feet (3.99 m) tall and semi-trailers as well as bicycles and pedestrians are prohibited in the tunnel.

Other significant structures include the Pine Creek and Virgin River Bridges and a second, short tunnel through a rock spur east of the main tunnel.

The Zion – Mount Carmel Highway was added to the National Register of Historic Places on July 7, 1987. The Zion Mt. Carmel Tunnel and Highway was designated as a National Historic Civil Engineering Landmark by the American Society of Civil Engineers in 2011.

== See also ==
- East Entrance Sign (Zion National Park)
- Floor of the Valley Road
- List of bridges documented by the Historic American Engineering Record in Utah
- List of tunnels documented by the Historic American Engineering Record in Utah
- National Register of Historic Places listings in Kane County, Utah
- National Register of Historic Places listings in Zion National Park
