= National Register of Historic Places listings in Emery County, Utah =

Location of Emery County in Utah

This is a list of the National Register of Historic Places listings in Emery County, Utah.

This is intended to be a complete list of the properties and districts on the National Register of Historic Places in Emery County, Utah, United States. Latitude and longitude coordinates are provided for many National Register properties and districts; these locations may be seen together in a map.

There are 22 properties and districts listed on the National Register in the county, including 1 National Historic Landmark.

This National Park Service list is complete through NPS recent listings posted May 29, 2026.

== Current listings ==
	Name on the Register	Image	Date listed	Location	City or town	Description
1	Black Dragon Canyon Pictographs	Black Dragon Canyon Pictographs	September 4, 1980 (#80003905)	Address Restricted	Green River	
2	Buckhorn Wash Rock Art Sites	Buckhorn Wash Rock Art Sites	August 1, 1980 (#80003898)	Address Restricted	Castle Dale	
3	Castle Dale Bridge	Castle Dale Bridge	September 13, 2019 (#100004394)	approximately 200 S. Center St., spanning Cottonwood Creek; 39°12′32″N 111°01′14″W	Castle Dale vicinity	
4	Castle Dale High School Shop	Castle Dale High School Shop	April 1, 1985 (#85000804)	300 N. Center St. 39°12′59″N 111°01′13″W	Castle Dale	No longer extant per Google Street View.
5	Castle Dale School	Castle Dale School	September 6, 1978 (#78002657)	65 E. 100 North; 39°12′51″N 111°01′02″W	Castle Dale	Now houses the Castle Dale City Hall and the Emery County Pioneer Museum
6	Paul C. Christensen House	Paul C. Christensen House	December 2, 1980 (#80003899)	15 E. 100 North; 39°12′48″N 111°01′10″W	Castle Dale	Victorian house from 1906, home and office of Castle Dale's first dentist.
7	Denver and Rio Grande Lime Kiln	Denver and Rio Grande Lime Kiln	August 26, 1980 (#80003901)	Southeast of Cleveland, along County Rd. 335 south of Cedar Mountain; 39°11′16″N 110°42′09″W	Cleveland	
8	Desolation Canyon	Desolation Canyon	November 24, 1968 (#68000057)	Along the Green River in northeastern Emery County between Ouray and Green River; 39°30′01″N 110°01′19″W	Green River	Split between Emery, Grand, Carbon, and Uintah counties
9	Emery LDS Church	Emery LDS Church	February 22, 1980 (#80003903)	Off State Route 10; 38°55′27″N 111°14′48″W	Emery	
10	Ferron Box Pictographs and Petroglyphs	Ferron Box Pictographs and Petroglyphs	July 11, 1980 (#80003904)	Address Restricted	Ferron	
11	Ferron Presbyterian Church and Cottage	Ferron Presbyterian Church and Cottage	September 6, 1978 (#78002658)	Mill Rd. and 3rd West; 39°05′36″N 111°08′28″W	Ferron	
12	Green River Presbyterian Church	Green River Presbyterian Church	January 5, 1989 (#88002998)	134 W. 3rd Ave. 38°59′45″N 110°09′54″W	Green River	
13	Huntington Roller Mill and Miller's House	Huntington Roller Mill and Miller's House	September 27, 1979 (#79002495)	400 North and 550 West Sts. 39°20′02″N 110°58′36″W	Huntington	
14	Huntington Tithing Granary	Huntington Tithing Granary	January 25, 1985 (#85000261)	45 W. 300 North, rear 39°19′53″N 110°57′55″W	Huntington	No longer extant per Google Street View.
15	Peter Johansen House	Peter Johansen House	March 19, 1980 (#80003900)	830 N. Center St. 39°13′35″N 111°01′07″W	Castle Dale	
16	Lars Peter Larson House	Lars Peter Larson House	February 13, 1980 (#80003902)	210 E. 100 South; 39°20′49″N 110°50′49″W	Cleveland	
17	Leander Lemmon House	Leander Lemmon House	September 12, 2002 (#02001040)	45 W. Center St. 39°19′34″N 110°57′54″W	Huntington	
18	Rochester-Muddy Creek Petroglyph Site	Rochester-Muddy Creek Petroglyph Site	June 26, 1975 (#75001803)	Address Restricted	Emery	
19	San Rafael Bridge	San Rafael Bridge	June 3, 1996 (#96000617)	County Road 3-32 over the San Rafael River, approximately 23 miles (37 km) southeast of Castle Dale; 39°04′52″N 110°39′49″W	Castle Dale	
20	Justus Wellington Seeley II House	Justus Wellington Seeley II House	November 15, 1979 (#79002493)	Center and 100 South Sts. 39°12′40″N 111°01′06″W	Castle Dale	
21	Samuel Singleton House	Samuel Singleton House	November 8, 1979 (#79002494)	South of Ferron on State Route 10; 39°05′02″N 111°07′57″W	Ferron	
22	Temple Mountain Wash Pictographs	Temple Mountain Wash Pictographs	March 15, 1976 (#76001814)	Address Restricted	Hanksville	

== See also ==
- List of National Historic Landmarks in Utah
- National Register of Historic Places listings in Utah
