= Castle Dale School =

United States historic place in Utah

- U.S. National Register of Historic Places
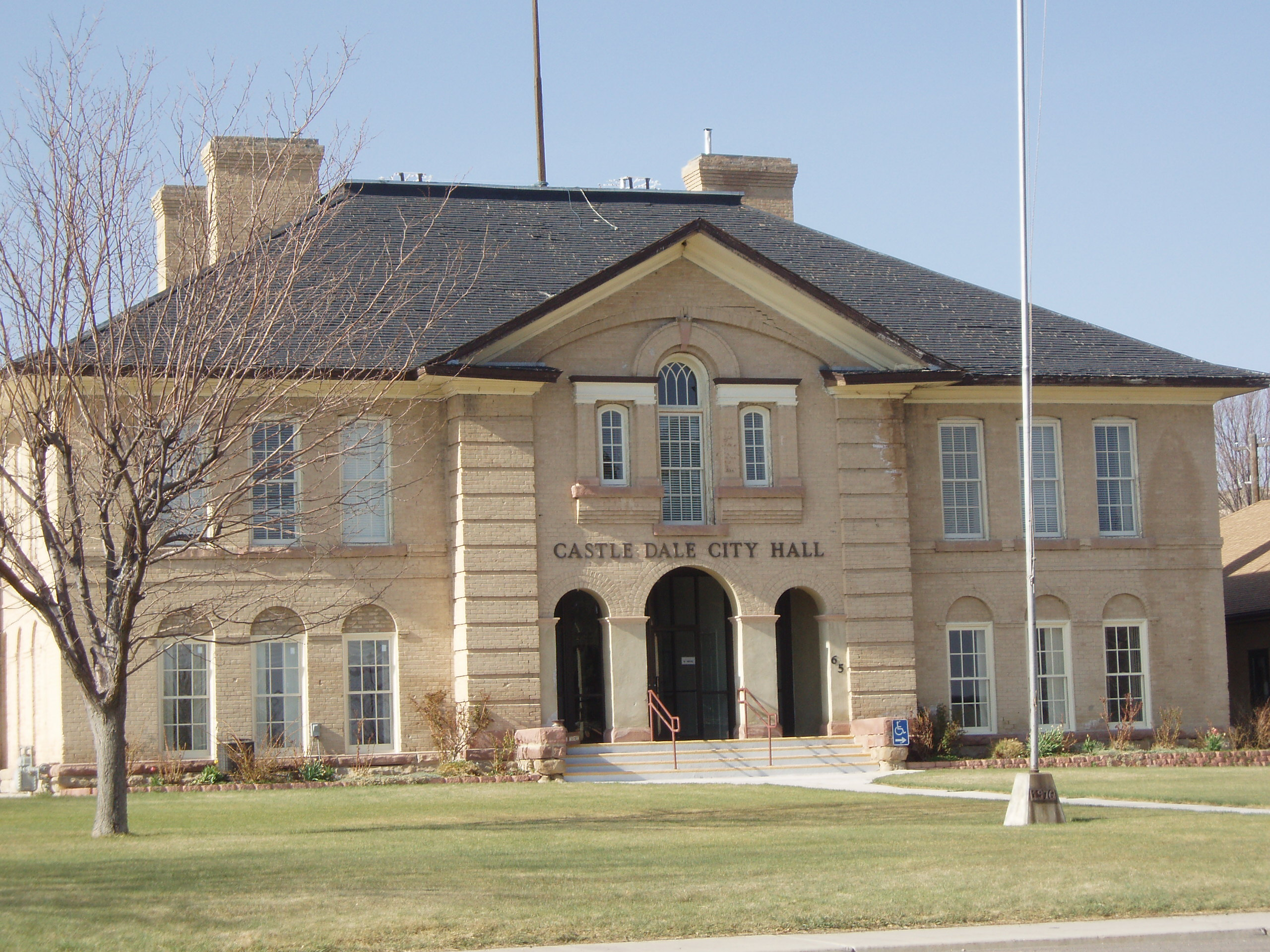

- Location within Utah Location within the United States
- Location: 100 North and 100 East, Castle Dale, Utah
- Coordinates: 39°12′51″N 111°01′02″W
- Area: 1.5 acres (0.61 ha)
- Built: 1907
- Built by: C.P. Anderson
- Architect: Samuel C. Dallas, William S. Hedges
- NRHP reference No.: 78002657
- Added to NRHP: September 6, 1978

The Castle Dale School, at 65 E. 100 North in Castle Dale, Utah, was built in 1907. It was listed on the National Register of Historic Places in 1978.

It was funded by a $5,000 local school bond, and the $350 design contract was awarded to Salt Lake City architects Samuel C. Dallas and William S. Hedges. It was to be an eight-room school house.

It is located at the northwest corner of 100 North and 100 East.

In recent years it has housed the Castle Dale City Hall and the Emery County Pioneer Museum.
