= Samuel Singleton House =

- U.S. National Register of Historic Places
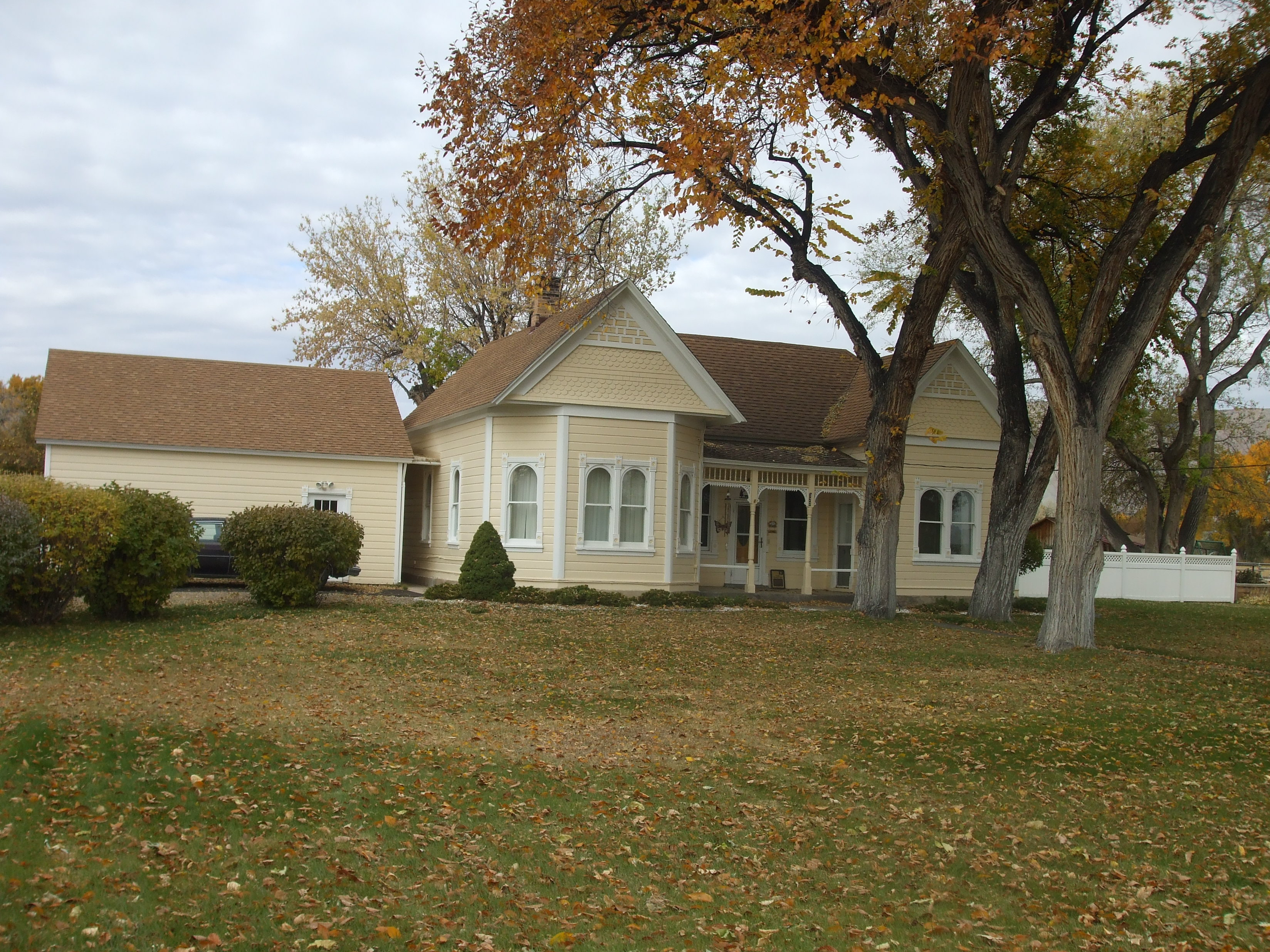
- The house in 2009

- Location within Utah Location within the United States
- Nearest city: Ferron, Utah
- Coordinates: 39°05′02″N 111°07′57″W
- Area: 3.6 acres (1.5 ha)
- Built: 1896
- Built by: Tom Jones, Will McKenzie
- Architectural style: Stick/eastlake, Eastlake
- NRHP reference No.: 79002494
- Added to NRHP: November 8, 1979

The Samuel Singleton House is a historic house in Ferron, Utah. It was built in 1896 for Thomas Singleton, a cattleman who went on to serve as the first mayor of Ferron in 1900. He became one of the largest landowners in Emery County, where he founded stores and a bank. He was a member of the Church of Jesus Christ of Latter-day Saints and a Republican, and the father of a son and four daughters; he died of pneumonia in 1929. The house was designed in the Stick-Eastlake style. It has been listed on the National Register of Historic Places since November 8, 1979.
