= Peter Johansen House =

- U.S. National Register of Historic Places
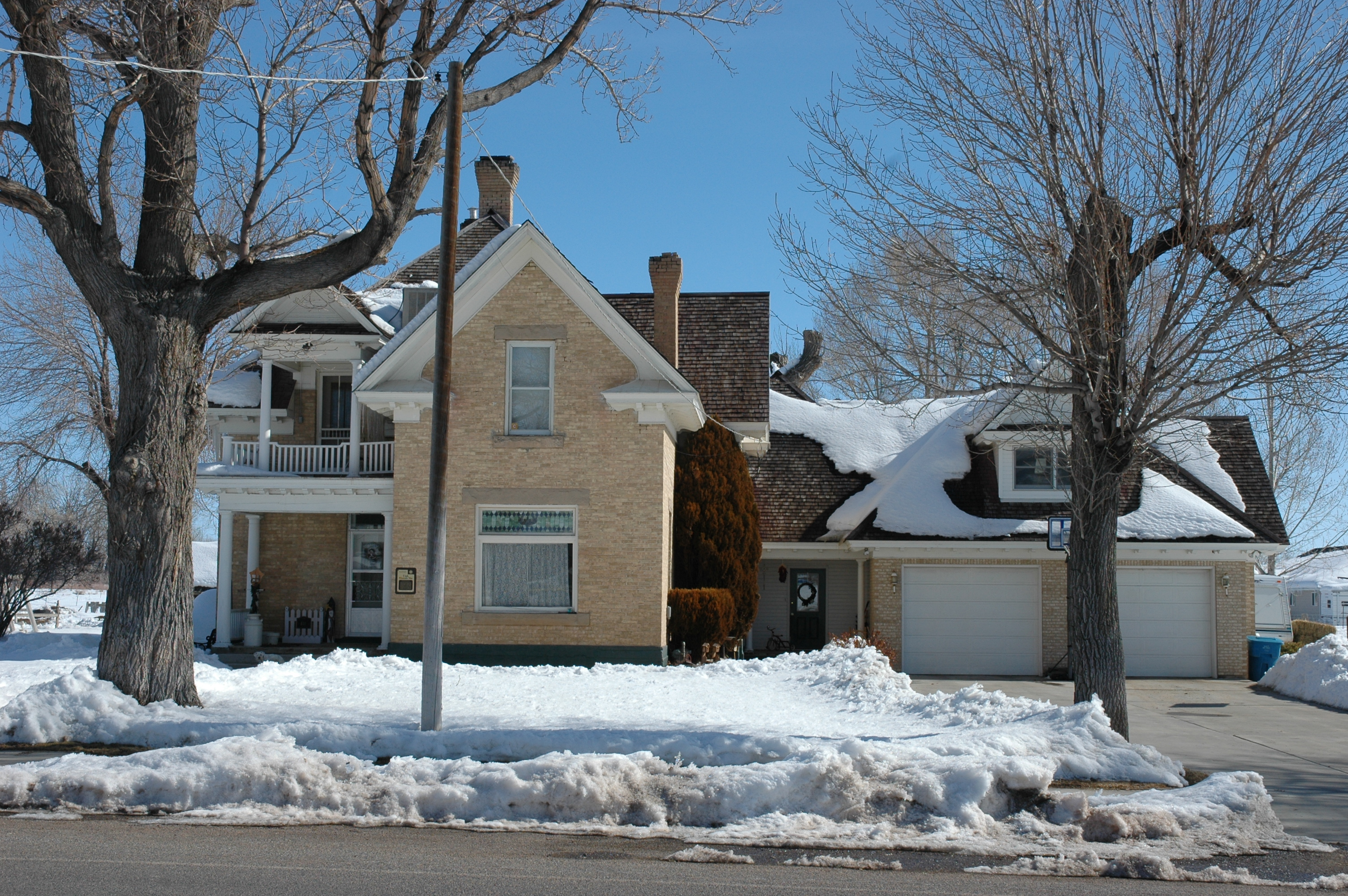
- The house in 2010

- Location within Utah Location within the United States
- Nearest city: Castle Dale, Utah
- Coordinates: 39°13′35″N 111°01′07″W
- Area: 6.8 acres (2.8 ha)
- Built: 1912
- Architectural style: Late Victorian
- NRHP reference No.: 80003900
- Added to NRHP: March 19, 1980

The Peter Johansen House is a historic house in Castle Dale, Utah. It was built with bricks from Provo in 1912 for Peter Johansen II, the son of Danish immigrants who converted to the Church of Jesus Christ of Latter-day Saints. Johansen was a cattle rancher, and he enlisted family members to build the house, which was designed in the Late Victorian style. He lived here with his first wife, née Zora Elizabeth Cook. After she died, he married Sophia Monsen Poulsen. Johansen had three sons and two daughters; he died in 1936. The house has been listed on the National Register of Historic Places since March 19, 1980.
