= Lars Peter Larson House =

- U.S. National Register of Historic Places
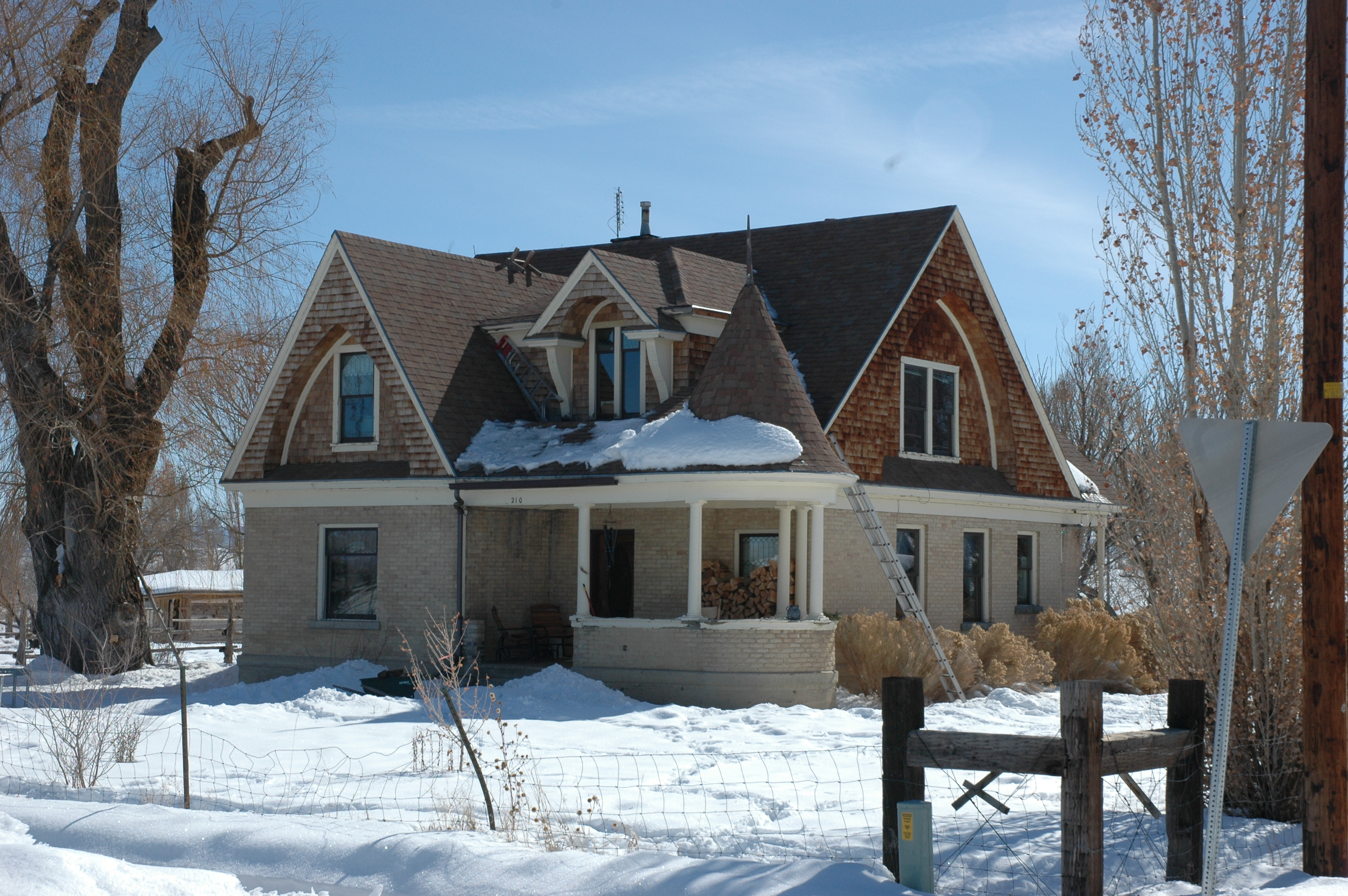
- The house in 2010

- Location within Utah Location within the United States
- Location: Off UT 155, Cleveland, Utah
- Coordinates: 39°20′49″N 110°50′49″W
- Area: less than one acre
- Built: 1908
- Architectural style: Shingle Style
- NRHP reference No.: 80003902
- Added to NRHP: February 13, 1980

The Lars Peter Larson House is a historic house in Cleveland, Utah. It was built in 1908 for Lars Peter Larson, the son of Danish immigrants who converted to the Church of Jesus Christ of Latter-day Saints. Larson, who worked as farmer, shepherder, and a salesman for the LDS-run Cleveland Cooperative Mercantile Association, lived here with his wife, née Nora Oveson. The house was designed in the Shingle style, and it was meant to resemble a castle. The Larsons moved to Salt Lake City in 1915, and the house was acquired by Joseph Locke, followed by Harry C. Allred, and Ronald Norris. Larson died in Los Angeles in 1962. The house has been listed on the National Register of Historic Places since February 13, 1980.
