= William Hedges =

William Hedges may refer to:

- William Hedges (Australian politician) (1856–1935), Australian politician
- William Hedges (New South Wales politician) (1881–1962), Australian politician
- William Hedges (colonial administrator) (1632–1701), English merchant and Governor of Bengal
- William S. Hedges (1860–1914), American surveyor and architect

== See also ==
- William Hedges-White, 3rd Earl of Bantry (1801–1884), Anglo-Irish peer
