= San Rafael Bridge (Utah) =

- U.S. National Register of Historic Places
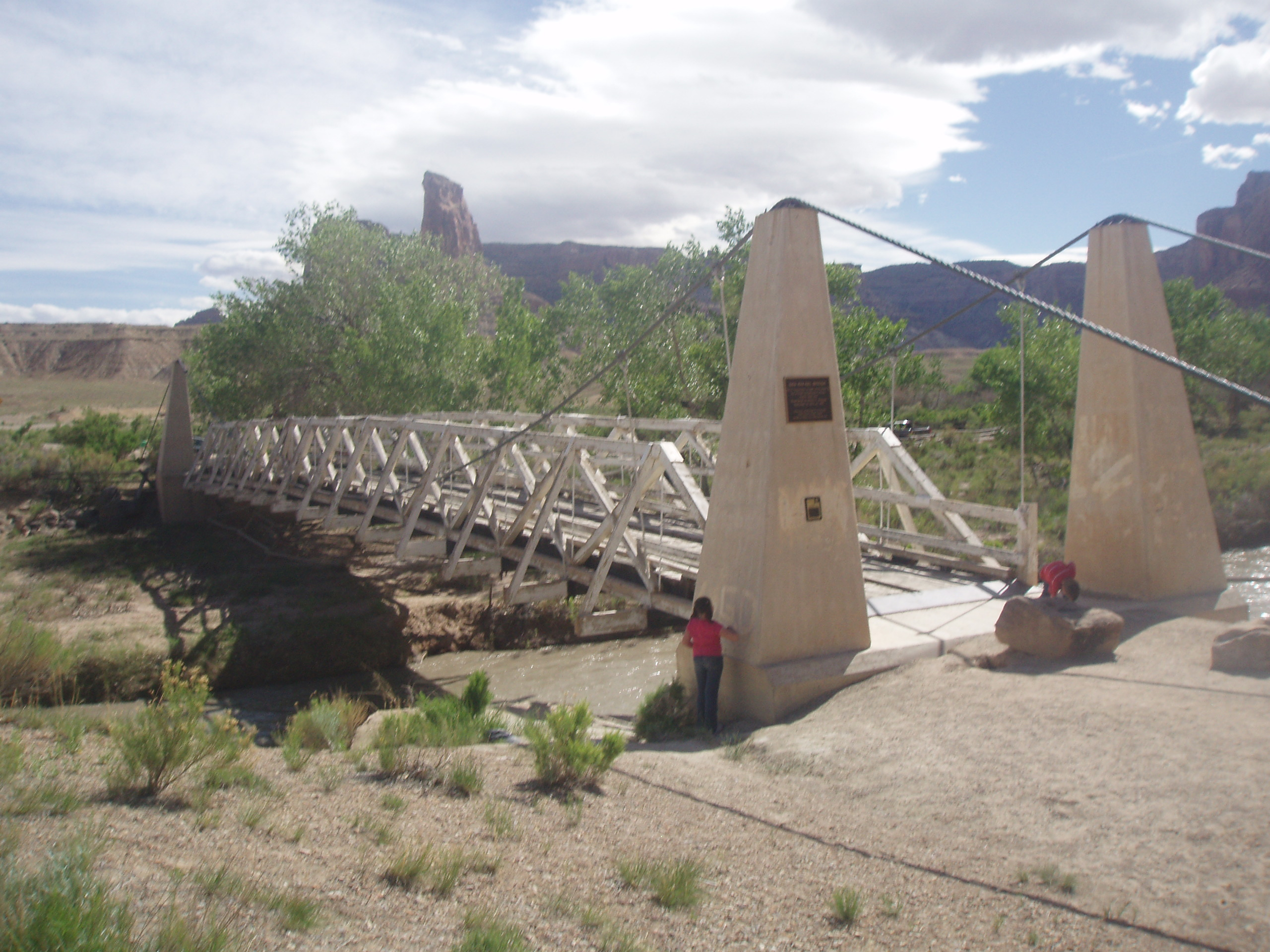
- San Rafael Bridge, May 2011

- Location within Utah Location within the United States
- Location: Buckhorn Road (approximately 23 miles [37 km] southeast of Castle Dale); Emery County, Utah; United States
- Coordinates: 39.0811113°N 110.6673812°W
- Area: Less than one acre
- Built: 1935–1937
- Built by: Civilian Conservation Corp
- NRHP reference No.: 96000617
- Added to NRHP: June 3, 1996

The San Rafael Bridge (also known as the San Rafael Swinging Bridge or the Buckhorn Wash Bridge) is a historic suspension bridge over the San Rafael River in central Emery County, Utah, United States, that is listed on the National Register of Historic Places (NRHP).

== Description ==
The bridge was built by the Civilian Conservation Corps in between 1935 and 1937. Until the 1990s, it was the only bridge crossing the river. It no longer carries automobile traffic, but it is still open for pedestrian use. It was added to the NRHP June 3, 1996.

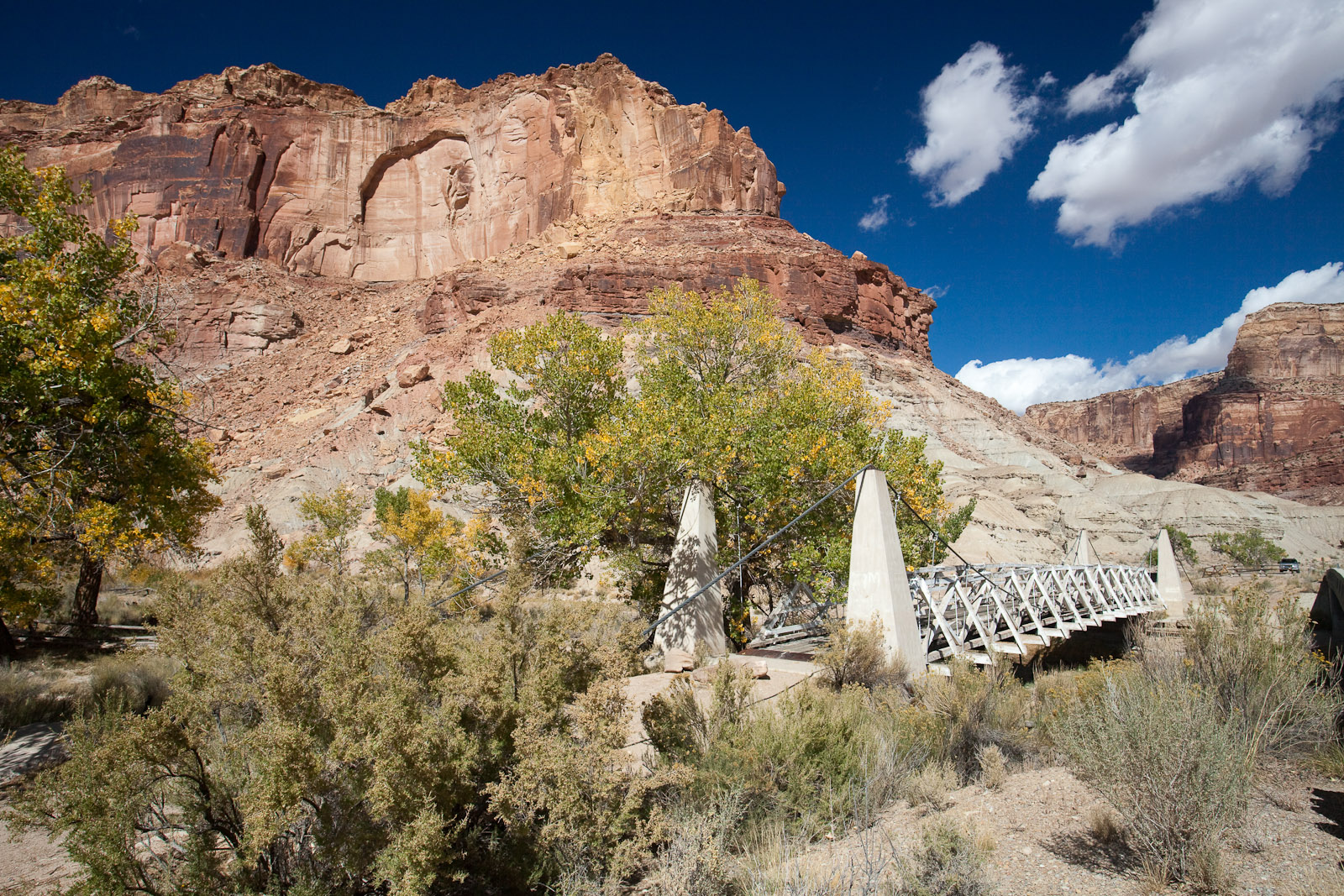
San Rafael Bridge, October 2009

== See also ==
- List of bridges on the National Register of Historic Places in Utah
- List of bridges documented by the Historic American Engineering Record in Utah
- National Register of Historic Places listings in Emery County, Utah
