= Salt Lake City and County Building =

Historic building in Salt Lake City, Utah, U.S.

- U.S. National Register of Historic Places
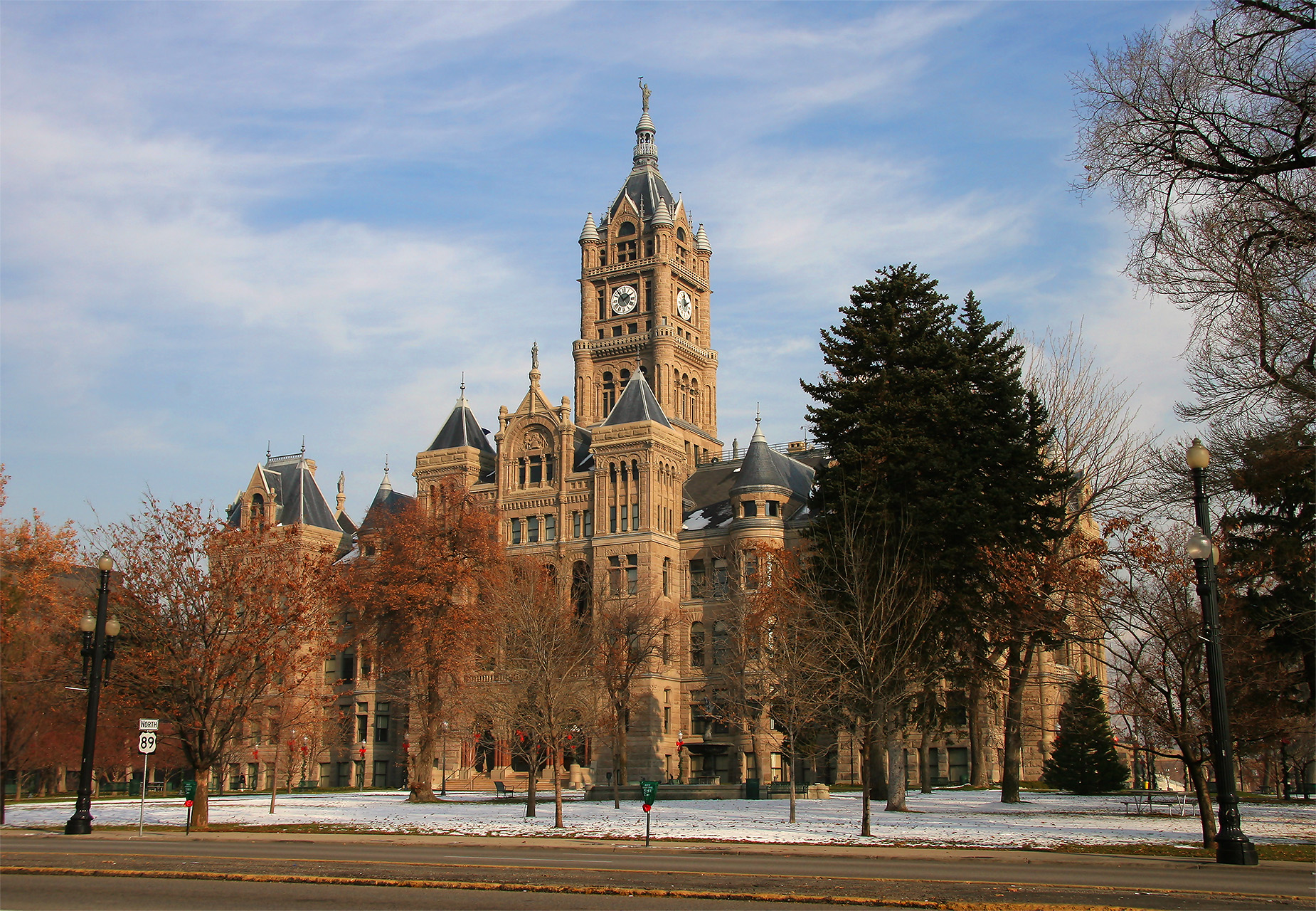
- The Salt Lake City and County Building, seat of city government since 1894

- Location within Utah Location within the United States
- Location: 451 Washington Square, Salt Lake City, Utah
- Coordinates: 40°45′34.5″N 111°53′12.5″W
- Area: 10 acres (4.0 ha)
- Built: 1891–1894
- Architect: Bird & Monheim Proudfoot; W.S. Mills
- Architectural style: Richardsonian Romanesque
- NRHP reference No.: 70000629
- Added to NRHP: June 15, 1970

The Salt Lake City and County Building, usually called the "City-County Building", is the seat of government for Salt Lake City, Utah. The historic landmark formerly housed offices for Salt Lake County government as well, hence the name.

== History ==
The building was originally constructed by freemasons between 1891 and 1894 to house offices for the city and county of Salt Lake and replace the Salt Lake City Council Hall and Salt Lake County Courthouse, both erected in the 1860s.

Construction of the building was riddled with controversy. During the late 19th and early 20th centuries the City and County Building was the symbol of non-Mormon citizens' open defiance of the Church of Jesus Christ of Latter-day Saints. It was designed to rival the Salt Lake Temple as the city's architectural centerpiece. It is even thought that the building's clock tower and statues were designed to mimic the temple's spires and statue of the angel Moroni. Ironically, the building was originally the 1880s brainchild of the Church-backed "People's Party." When the non-Mormon "Liberal Party" was campaigning for city government, they deemed the proposed "joint building" an example of the Church's extravagance and wastefulness. In a reversal of stance, the Liberals decided to go ahead with the building when they finally gained power in 1890. Construction began in February on State Street at about 100 South.

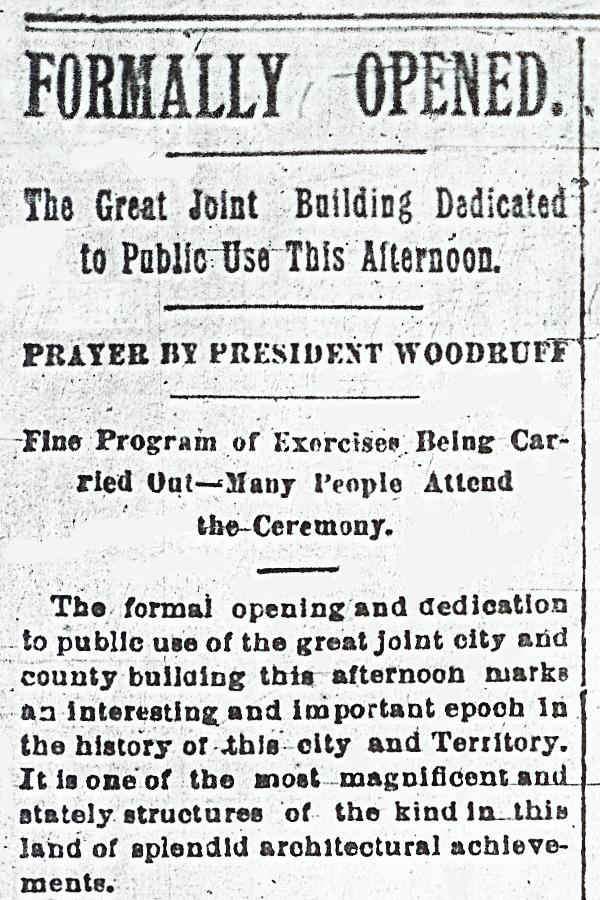
An outspoken critic through early construction, the Deseret News actually praised the picturesque structure after completion

For nebulous reasons, construction was halted that November after only the foundation had been laid. The mostly non-Mormon city council questioned the buildings plans which had been completed during the People's Party reign, and wavered on how to proceed. The Deseret News complained that the Liberals were wasting taxpayer money. Ultimately, the original plans and site for the building were scrapped and the whole project was moved to the building's current location at Washington Square. The Deseret News claimed this move served the City Council, which owned property around the site and would profit from increased land values. Nonetheless, construction on new plans began by late 1891. The cornerstone was laid July 25, 1892. Mormon president Wilford Woodruff's journals reported his attendance at the building's dedication on December 28, 1894.

The architectural firm of Monheim, Bird, and Proudfoot designed the Richardsonian Romanesque building (Olpin et al., 2005). Henry Monheim (a local architect since the 1870s), George Washington Bird (1854–1950; from Wichita, Kansas and William Thomas Proudfoot (1860–1928; also of Wichita) established the firm in 1891 specifically to design the building. Their firm won a building design contest against 14 other submissions. However, The Salt Lake Herald—another LDS-backed paper—claimed that the competition was a "pretentious fraud." Monheim, a Prussian immigrant, died one year into construction. Bird and Proudfoot moved to Philadelphia and Chicago respectively by 1896, so the City-County Building was their firm's only output. According to staff at the Utah State Archives, there are currently no surviving original architectural blueprints, structural drawings, engineering calculations, or detailed construction ledgers on record for the building.

The building was monstrously overbudget. Estimated by the firm at $350,000, the winning contractor bid $377,978, but by the building's dedication on December 28, 1894, it had cost nearly $900,000. Complicating matters was the Panic of 1893 which cut Salt Lake City and County revenues nearly in half. As a result of this, plans for large stained glass windows for the building were discarded.

Although now used exclusively by Salt Lake City government, the building originally served many functions. Salt Lake County offices called the structure home until the 1980s when the County elected to build a new complex at 2100 South and State Street.

The building served as Utah's Capitol from when statehood was granted in 1896 until the present Utah State Capitol was completed in 1915. The Salt Lake City and County building also housed Salt Lake's first public library and contained courtrooms, including one that condemned organizer Joe Hill to death amid international attention in 1914.

At the conclusion of a few years of exhaustive renovation and remodeling of the building, and with an eye toward historical accuracy, the building was reopened in 1989. This was done in concert with a seismic upgrade called base isolation that placed the weak sandstone structure on a foundation of steel and rubber to better protect it from earthquake damage.

In March of 2020, the building was shuttered after a 5.7-magnitude earthquake that shook the Wasatch Front. However, thanks to the base isolation invested in decades ago, the repairs needed were minimal. The building was reopened to the public in November of 2021.

== Features ==
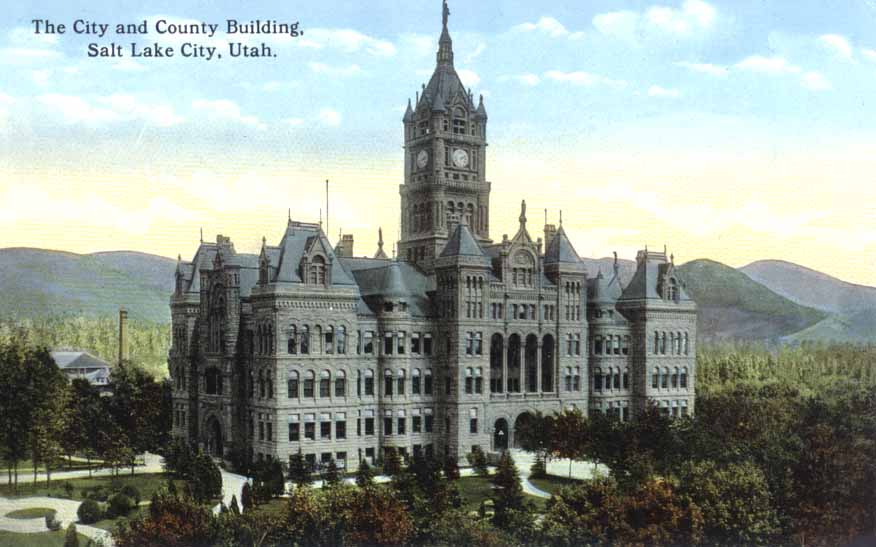
circa 1923

The Salt Lake City and County Building's central clock tower is topped with a statue of Columbia and rises 256 feet (78 m) from the ground. The building's primary axis runs north-south, and large entrances mark each cardinal direction. On the south wing (over the Mayor's office) is a bronze statue of the goddess Justice. Originally, the building had statues depicting Commerce, Liberty, Justice, and Columbia, but the others were removed following a 1934 earthquake. Columbia and the other missing statues were replaced on top of the building when it was renovated in 1989. (Note: "There have been many small carving projects over the years but the last large project I worked on was for the east entrance of the City and County Building. This is an 8 foot statue of our Lady of Commerce. The statue is in copper which was formed over wooden frames carved to form the statue. I designed the statue and made all the wood forms over which the metal was shaped. Rudy Chagney did the metal work and put all the pieces together to form the final statue. This was the first of the statues made for the restoration of the City and County Building. The statue was considered an individual project but was included in the roof repair. The other four statues were let as contracts to artists and they got credit for their work when the City and County Building was completely refurbished. I never got any credit for my work. I got paid and so that was some satisfaction.")

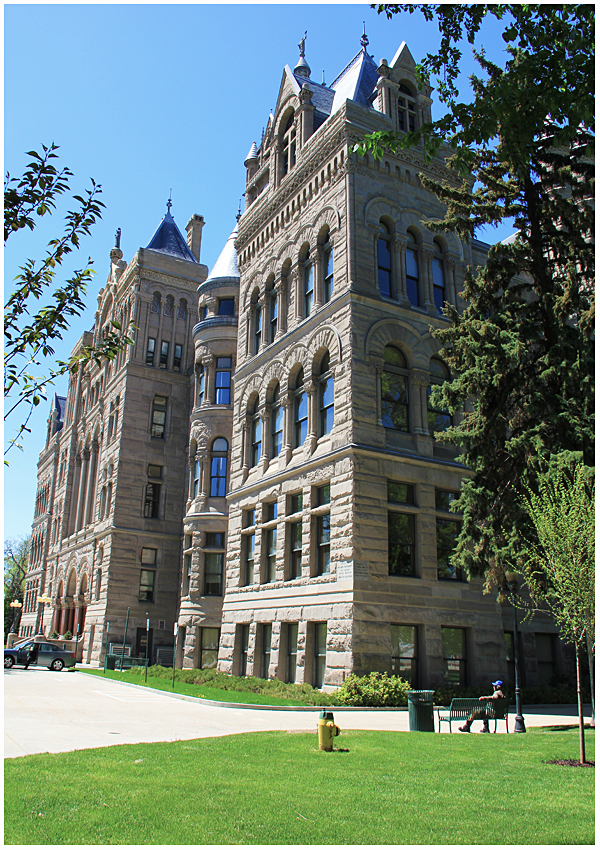
Salt Lake City and County Building Utah US May 15, 2011

The building's surface is elaborately carved from the gray Utah Kyune sandstone. To the right of the entrance on the south side is the face of Father DeSmet, a Jesuit priest who preached to Native Americans and had contact with the Latter-day Saints before and after they traveled to Utah. To the left is the Spanish conquistador García López de Cárdenas who explored Southern Utah by 1540. Above the granite columns on the east and west sides of the building are carvings of pioneer women. Between the portal and balcony are portraits of Chief Joseph and Chief Wakara and Jim Bridger. Above the west entrance left-to-right are Robert N. Baskin, mayor of Salt Lake City in 1892–1895, Jedediah M. Grant, Salt Lake's first mayor in 1851–1857, and Jacob B. Blair Salt Lake County's probate judge in 1892–1895. The north side features a depiction of the Domínguez–Escalante expedition which entered Utah in 1776 and named many of the state's physical features. Gargoyles, eagles, sea monsters, beehives, Masonic icons, suns, and other symbols dot the building's rich exterior.

Walter Baird and Oswald Lendi carved most of the building's features. Lendi, a French sculptor, whimsically carved his face between the words "City" and "Hall" above the north entrance.

The building has five floors and over 100 rooms. Onyx lines the hall of each lavishly decorated floor. The third floor houses the mayor's office in the south wing and the city council chambers in the north. The council meeting room features an 1865 life-sized portrait of Brigham Young. Portraits of the city's past mayors up to and including Ross "Rocky" Anderson line the corridor between these offices. The third floor features an exhibit commemorating the 2002 Winter Olympics held in Salt Lake City.

Around the time of the 2002 Salt Lake Olympics, an electric display depicting the Olympic rings was displayed on four sides of the central tower of the City and County building. The Olympic display has since been removed from the building.

== Washington Square ==
The Seal of Salt Lake City depicts the building

The City-County Building sits between State Street, Second East, Fourth South, and Fifth South in Salt Lake City, a block called "Washington Square." Named for George Washington, from about 1859 until the mid 1860s, the square served as the campground for newly arrived Mormon pioneers along with other emigrants passing through the city on their way to areas further west, such as California. Later, the square was the site numerous entertainments, such as a skating pond, baseball park, and was used as circus grounds. Then in the 1890s, the City-County Building was constructed in the center of the block.

== See also ==
- Base isolation
- Earthquake engineering
- List of tallest buildings in Salt Lake City
