= Emanuel Kahn House =

Historic house in Salt Lake City, Utah, U.S.

- U.S. National Register of Historic Places
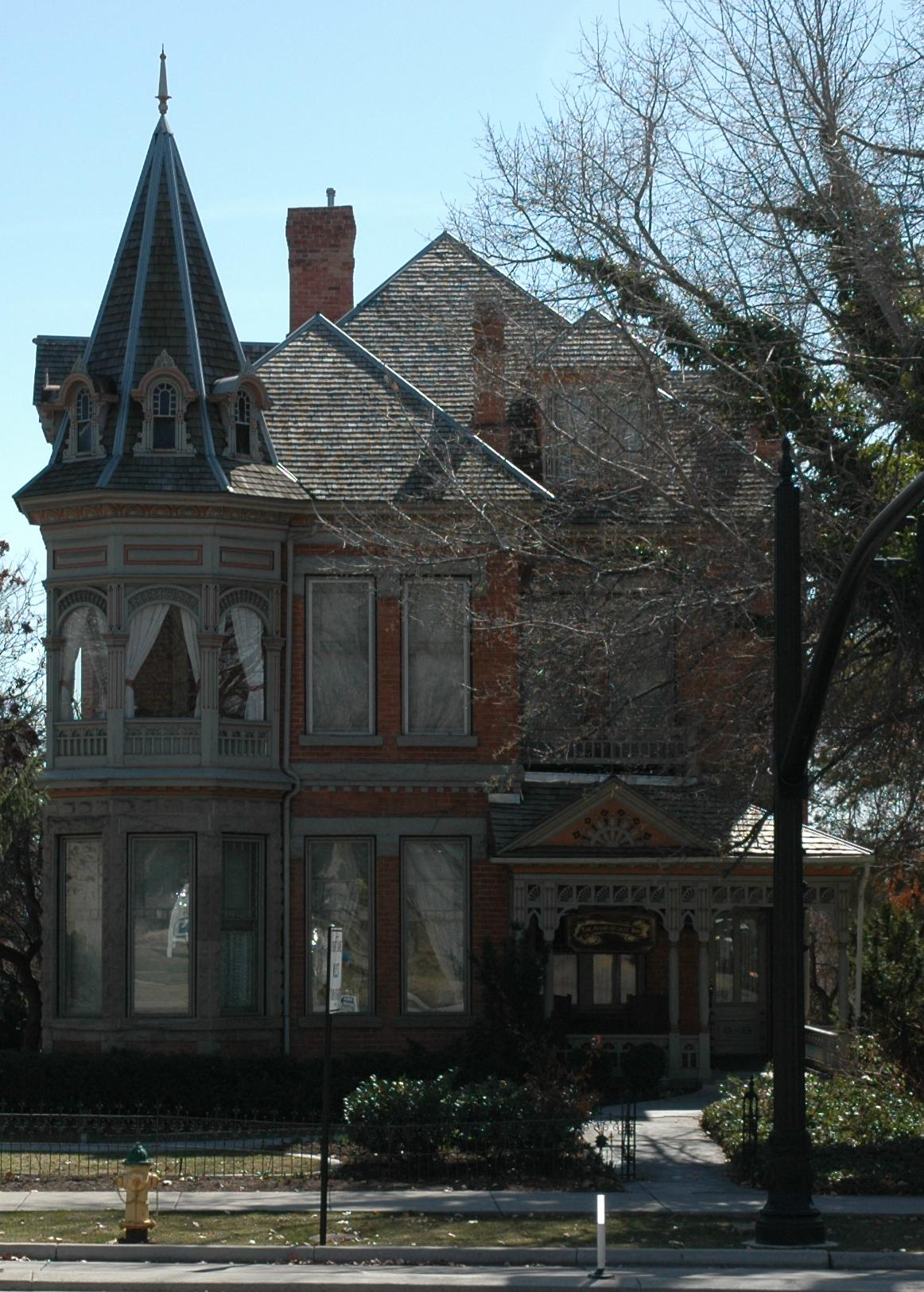

- Location within Utah Location within the United States
- Location: 678 E. South Temple St., Salt Lake City, Utah
- Coordinates: 40°46′9″N 111°52′15″W
- Area: less than one acre
- Built: 1889
- Architect: Monheim, Henry
- Architectural style: Queen Anne
- NRHP reference No.: 77001309
- Added to NRHP: July 21, 1977

The Emanuel Kahn House, at 678 E. South Temple St. in Salt Lake City, Utah, is a Queen Anne house that was built in 1889. It was listed on the National Register of Historic Places in 1977.

It is significant for its association with Emanuel Kahn, an immigrant from Germany, who was one of the first Jewish merchants in Utah. It is significant as a Queen Anne style house.

Its architect, Henry Monheim, was one of the first "Gentile" (non-Mormon) architects in Utah.

A contributing building in the South Temple Historic District, it now houses a bed and breakfast called The Anniversary Inn.
