= Ferron Presbyterian Church and Cottage =

Historic church in Utah, United States

- U.S. National Register of Historic Places
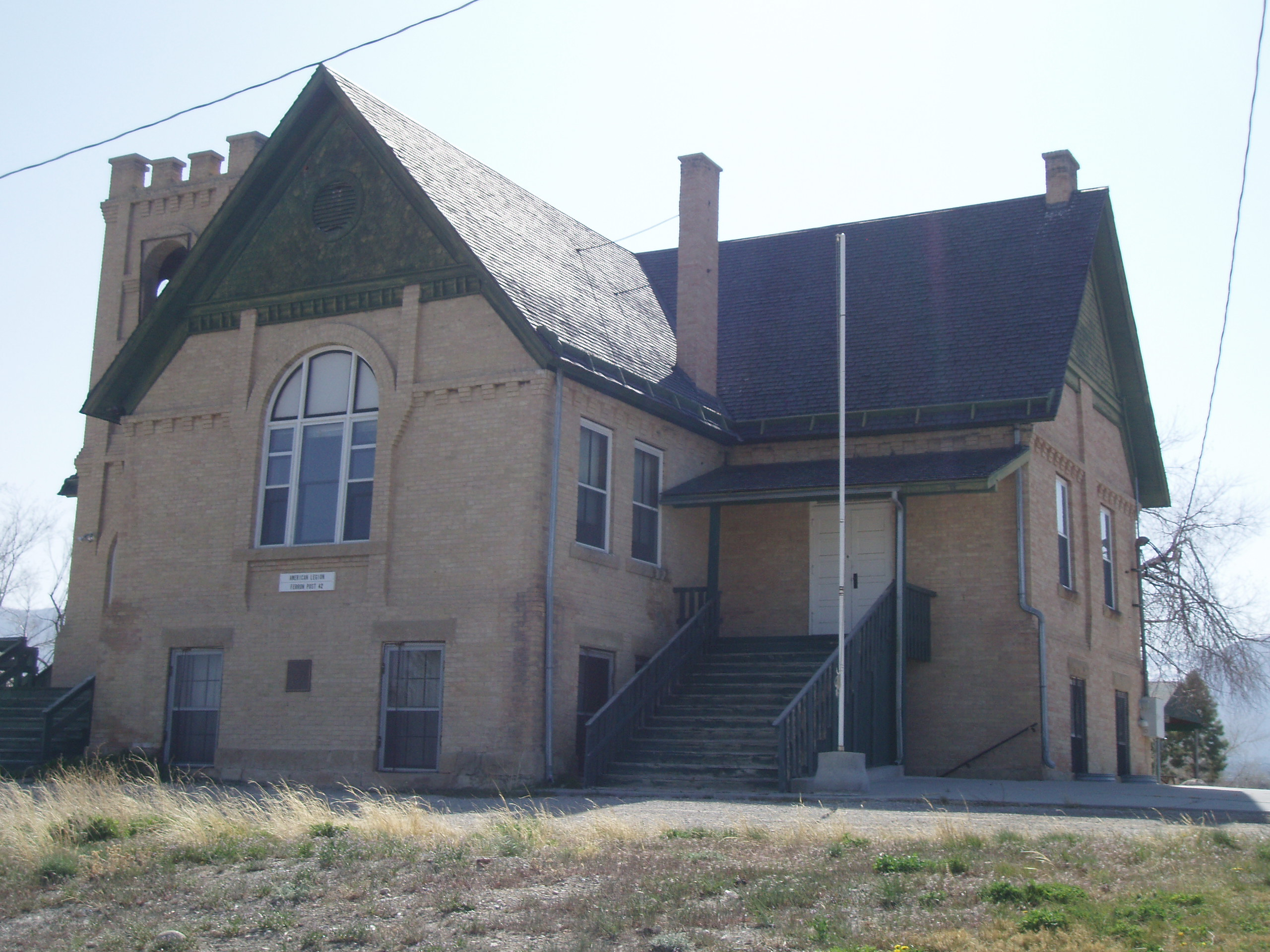

- Location within Utah Location within the United States
- Location: Mill Rd. and 3rd West, Ferron, Utah
- Coordinates: 39°5′36″N 111°8′28″W
- Area: 3 acres (1.2 ha)
- Built: 1908
- Architect: Jones, Tom; McKenzie, Mac
- Architectural style: Late Gothic Revival
- NRHP reference No.: 78002658
- Added to NRHP: September 6, 1978

Ferron Presbyterian Church and Cottage (also known as the American Legion Hall) is a historic Presbyterian church at Mill Road and 3rd West in Ferron, Utah.

The Gothic Revival style building was constructed in 1908 as a Presbyterian church and school by the Christian Endeavor Society. The building was added to the National Register of Historic Places in 1978. It is now an American Legion Hall.
