= Brooks Arcade =

Historic building in Salt Lake City, Utah, U.S.

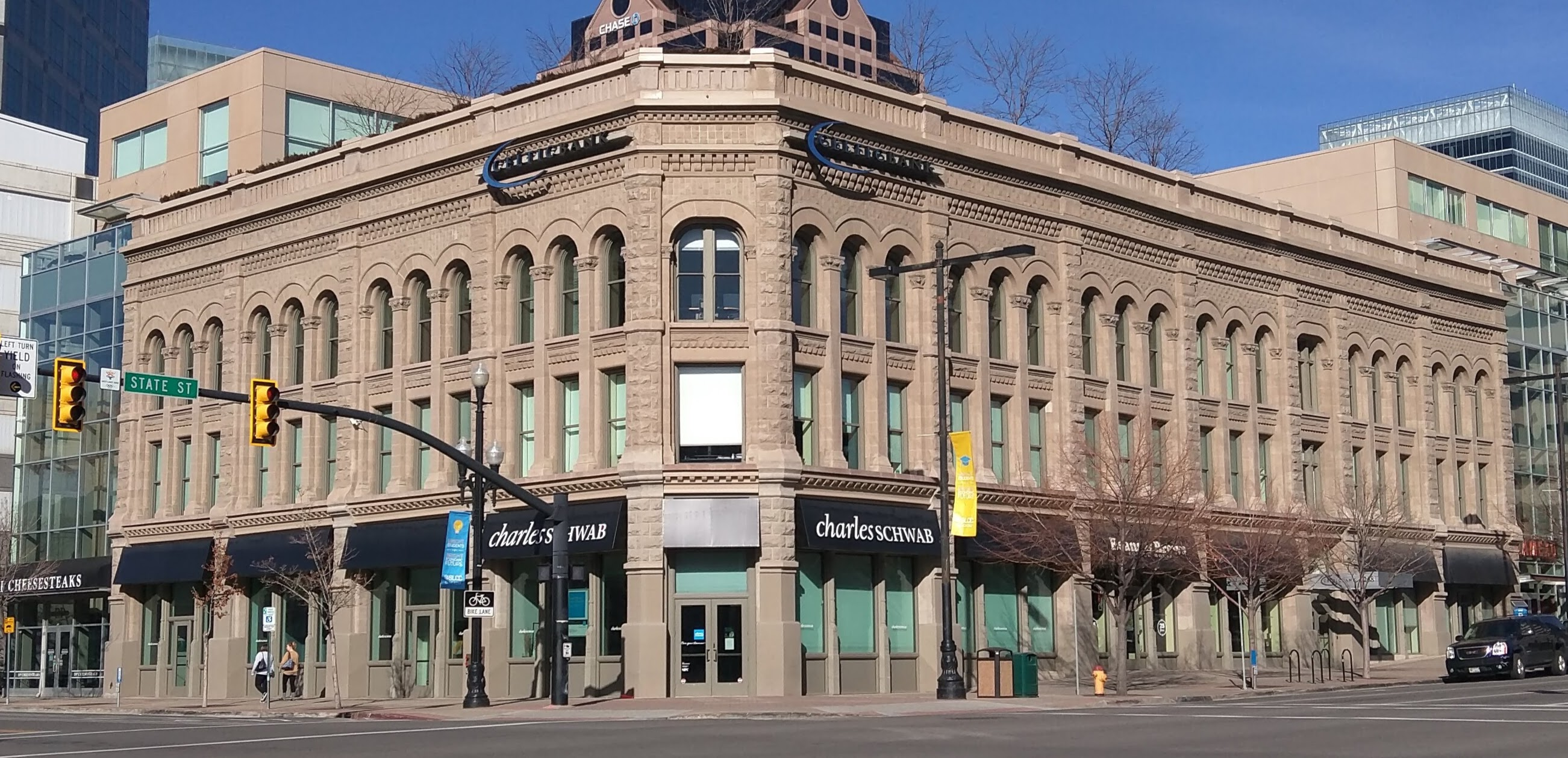
- The building in 2018

General information
- Location: 268 South State Street, Salt Lake City, United States
- Construction started: 1890
- Completed: 1891

Design and construction
- Architects: Samuel Cleeton Dallas; William S. Hedges

The Brooks Arcade is a historic building in Salt Lake City, Utah. It was built in 1890-1891 as a department store for Julius Brooks, an immigrant from Germany who was one of the first Jewish settlers of Salt Lake City. The building was designed by architects Samuel Cleeton Dallas and William S. Hedges in the Richardsonian Romanesque style.

The building was removed from the National Register of Historic Places.
