= Henry Monheim =

American architect

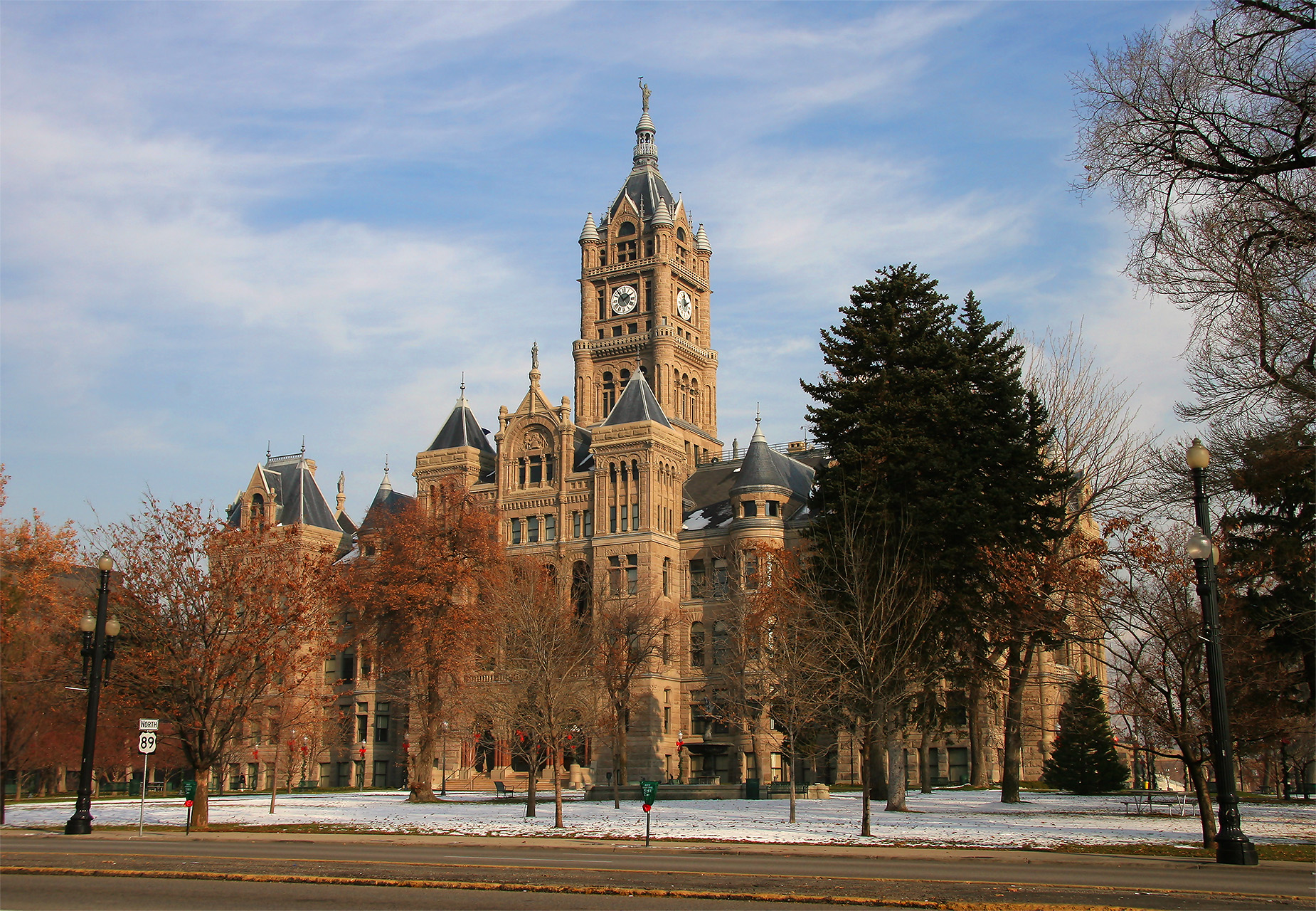
Salt Lake City and County Building

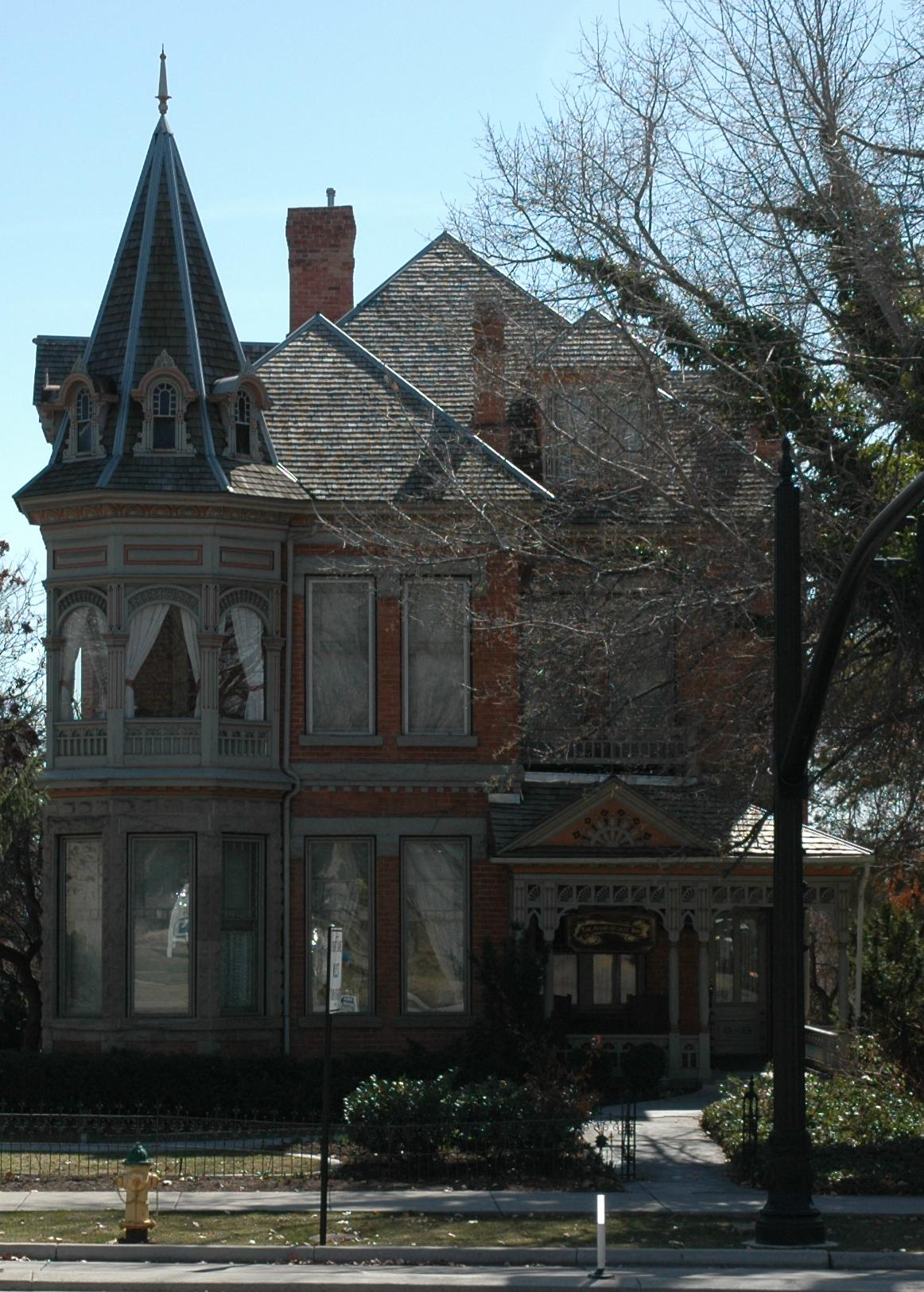
Emanuel Kahn House

Henry Monheim (1824—1893) was an American architect who was one of the first "Gentile" (non-Mormon) architects practicing in Salt Lake City, Utah.

Monheim served as the first president of Utah's first professional architectural association, the Salt Lake City Institute of Architects.

He was associated briefly with architects George Washington Bird (1854-1950; from Wichita, Kansas) and William Thomas Proudfoot (1860-1928; also of Wichita) in several works credited to Monheim, Bird & Proudfoot. These works, during just 1892 and 1893, were several buildings in Salt Lake City which provided entree into Salt Lake City for Proudfoot & Bird. Before and after this partnership ended by Monheim's death in 1893, Proudfoot & Bird became much more well-known and was much more influential.

Several of Monheim's works are listed on the U.S. National Register of Historic Places (NRHP).

Monheim's works include (with attribution):

- Best-Cannon House, 1146 S. 900 East, Salt Lake City (Monheim, Bird & Proudfoot), NRHP-listed
- Emanuel Kahn House, 678 E. South Temple St., Salt Lake City, (Monheim, Henry), NRHP-listed
- Carriage house (1872) of what is now the Alfred W. McCune Mansion (designed by another architect), 200 N. Main St., Salt Lake City, (Monheim, Henry), NRHP-listed
- Salt Lake City and County Building, 451 Washington Sq., Salt Lake City, (Proudfoot, Bird & Monheim), NRHP-listed
