= Denver and Rio Grande Lime Kiln =

- U.S. National Register of Historic Places
- Location within Utah Location within the United States
- Nearest city: Cleveland, Utah
- Coordinates: 39°11′17″N 110°42′06″W
- Area: less than one acre
- Built: 1881-82
- Built by: Denver & Rio Grande Western Railroad
- NRHP reference No.: 80003901
- Added to NRHP: August 26, 1980

The Denver and Rio Grande Lime Kiln, in Emery County, Utah near Cleveland, is a lime kiln which was built in 1881–82. It was listed on the National Register of Historic Places in 1980.

It was built by the Denver & Rio Grande Western Railroad. It has also been known as the Buckhorn Flat Lime Kiln.

It is a round structure built of uncoursed rubble stone. It has an arched doorway and, in 1980, had walls about 12 feet (3.7 m) tall. It originally had a conical roof, which has collapsed, and is believed to have been about 16 feet (4.9 m) tall in its complete height.

It was deemed "significant both as emblematic of the self-sufficiency of western railroads and as one of the few remnants of the Denver and Rio Grande Railroad Western grade across Buckhorn Flat in Emery County, Utah. The construction of this lime kiln in 1881-1882 was intimately associated with the grading of the track bed for the D&RGW's proposed route through the area. Part of the job consisted in building bridges or damming up washes so that tracks could be laid in a relatively straight line. Both types of construction involved the use of cement or mortar of which lime is an essential ingredient. This particular kiln was aptly located for the task, but was abandoned in about 1882 when the D&RGW shifted the route from Buckhorn Flat to the Woodside, Price River, and Colton route. It remains an isolated reminder of an abandoned scheme."
