= Green River Presbyterian Church =

Historic church in Utah, United States

- U.S. National Register of Historic Places
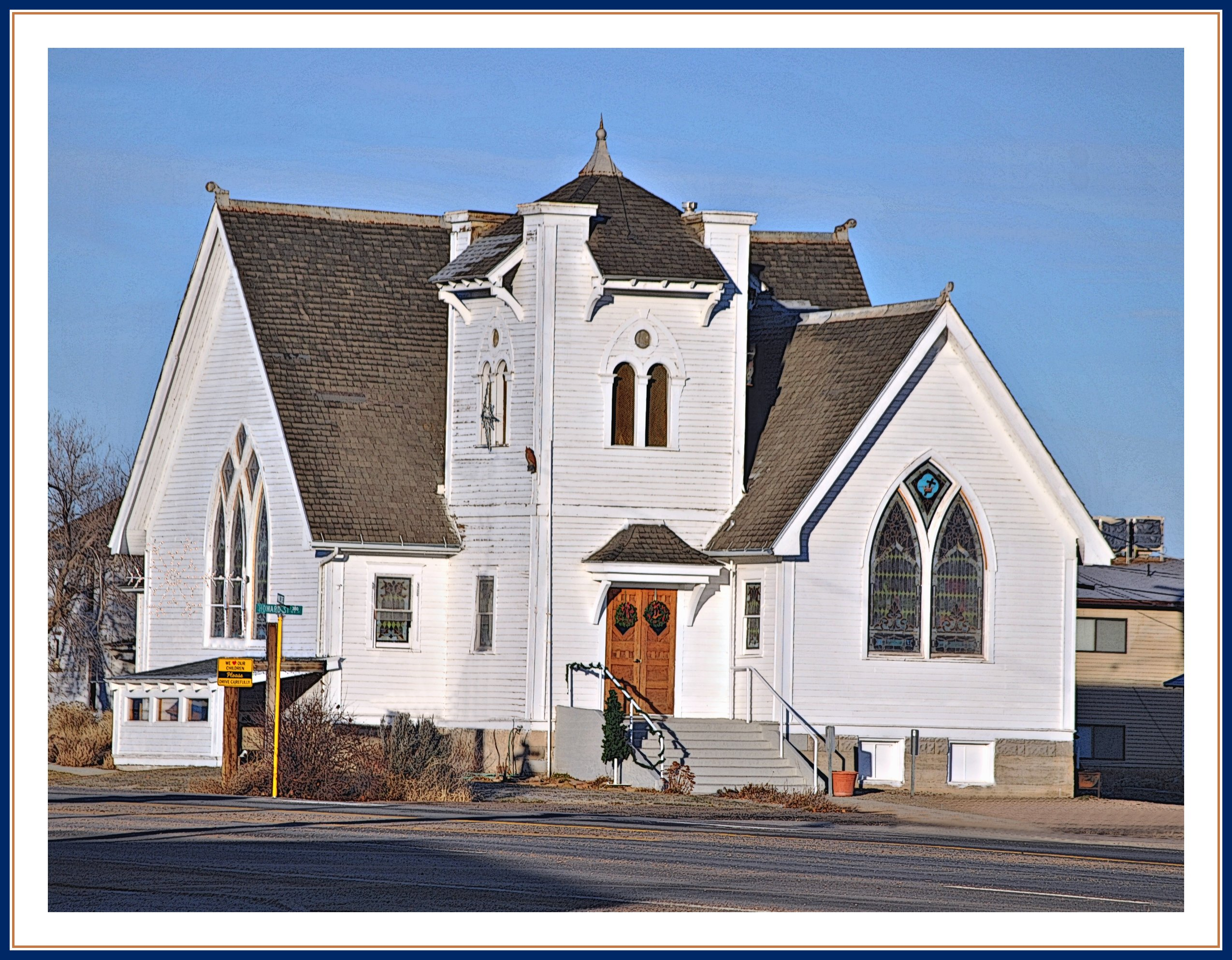

- Location within Utah Location within the United States
- Location: 134 W. Third Ave., Green River, Utah
- Coordinates: 38°59′45″N 110°9′54″W
- Area: less than one acre
- Built: 1906
- Architect: Ware & Treganza
- Architectural style: Late Gothic Revival
- NRHP reference No.: 88002998
- Added to NRHP: January 5, 1989

The Green River Presbyterian Church, also known as Green River Bible Church, is a historic Presbyterian church at 134 W. Third Avenue in Green River, Utah. The Late Gothic Revival building was constructed in 1906. The building was added to the National Register of Historic Places in 1989.

== Description ==
It was deemed architecturally significant at the local level as an excellent example of the Victorian Gothic style. It is also historically significant as the first church built in the town and as an important early example of the "community church" phase of Protestant church activity in Utah that was then predominantly inhabited by members of The Church of Jesus Christ of Latter-day Saints.

== See also ==
- National Register of Historic Places listings in Emery County, Utah
