= Paul C. Christensen House =

- U.S. National Register of Historic Places
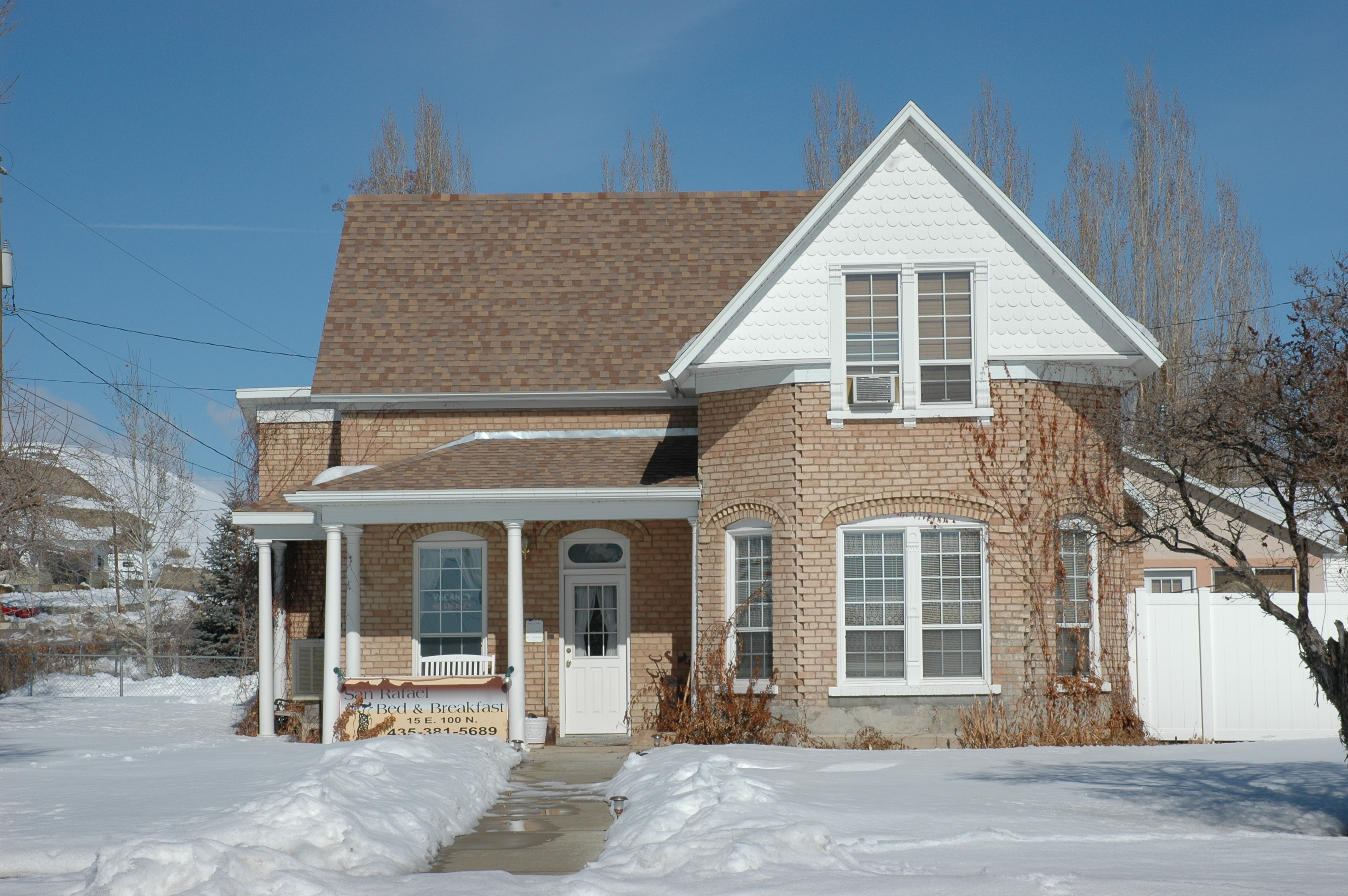

- Location within Utah Location within the United States
- Location: Off UT 10, Castle Dale, Utah
- Coordinates: 39.213439°N 111.019339°W
- Area: less than one acre
- Built: 1906
- Architectural style: Late Victorian
- NRHP reference No.: 80003899
- Added to NRHP: December 2, 1980

The Paul C. Christensen House, in Castle Dale in Emery County, Utah, was built in 1906. It was listed on the National Register of Historic Places in 1980. The listing included four contributing buildings.

It is a one-and-a-half-story brick Late Victorian house. It has a T-shaped plan, and has a rear one-story shed and hip roof extension. The front, gabled facade includes fish scale shingling in its upper portion, and a three-part bay below.

In 1980 it was deemed "architecturally significant as a distinctive variant of a Victorian Builder home in Utah. Its plan derives from the vernacular T plan, but its scale and detailing mark it as a transitional Victorian house type. While the Victorian Builder type is common in the small towns of Utah, the distinctive brick work and treatment of the front bay qualify this house as an outstanding example. It also contains some of the best examples of hand carved carpentry locally known. The barn is also included in the site, built in about the same time as the house. / It was probably first built for Castle Dale's only dentist, Paul C. Christensen, who served the community for forty- four years. Not only was this his residence, but it served as the first dentist's office in Emery County."

It is located one block off Utah State Route 10, at the northeast corner of N. Spartan Center St. and E. 100 N St. in Castle Dale. Its street address is 15 E 100 N. In 2019 it is operated as the San Rafael Bed & Breakfast.
