= William S. Hedges =

American architect

- Born: May 29, 1860; Terre Haute, Indiana, U.S.
- Died: February 25, 1914 (aged 53); Salt Lake City, Utah, U.S.
- Resting place: Salt Lake City Cemetery
- Occupation: Architect
- Spouse: Clara Wells
- Children: 2 sons, 1 daughter
- Relatives: Daniel H. Wells (father-in-law)

William S. Hedges (May 29, 1860 - February 25, 1914) was an American surveyor and architect who designed buildings in Salt Lake City listed on the National Register of Historic Places. He also worked for the surveyor general of Utah.

== Life ==
Hedges was born May 29, 1860, in Terre Haute, Indiana.

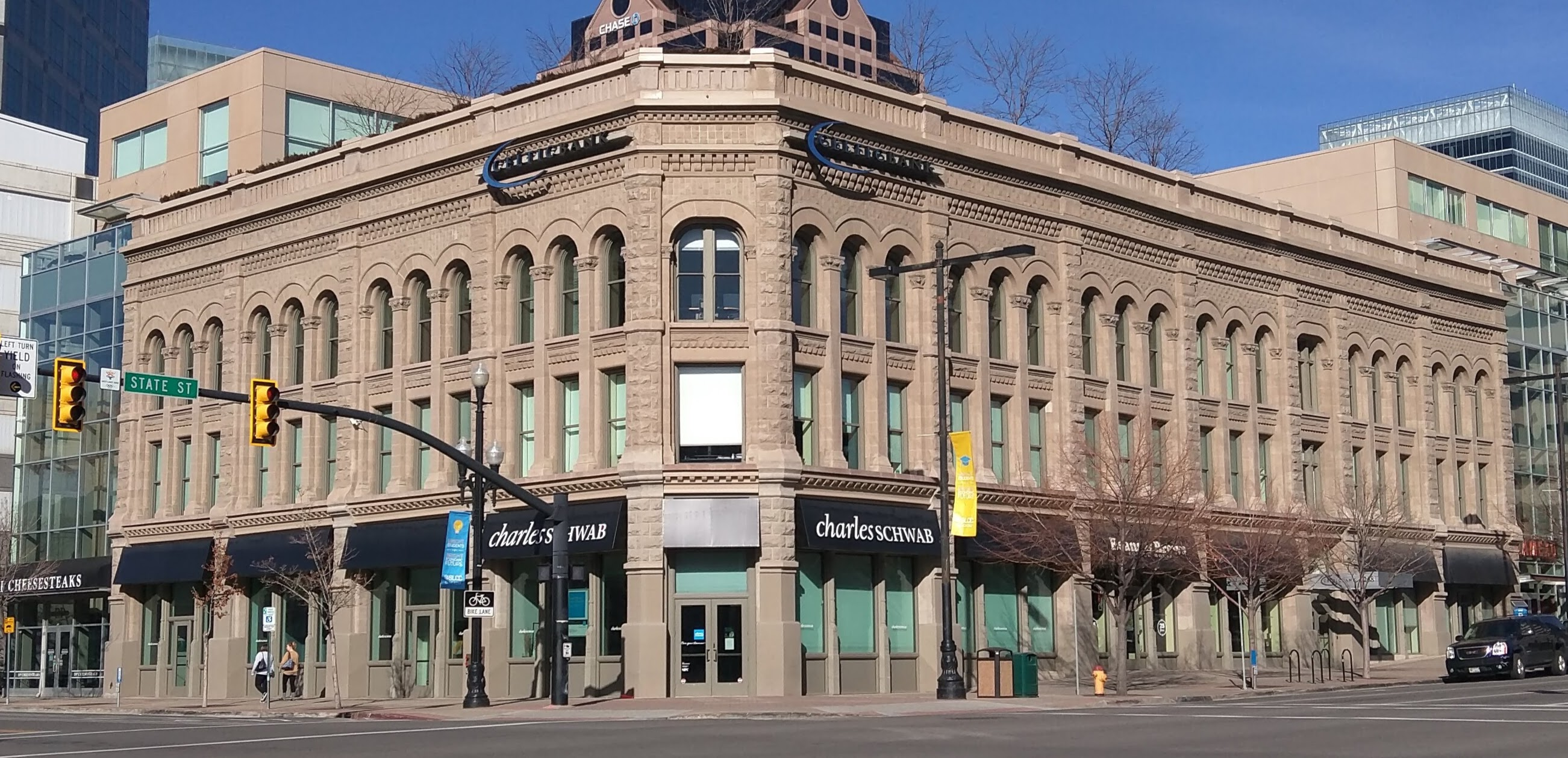
The Brooks Arcade in Salt Lake City, designed by Dallas & Hedges.

Hedges worked as a surveyor for the Denver and Rio Grande Western Railroad in 1881. With Samuel Cleeton Dallas, he co-founded Dallas & Hedges, an architectural firm in Salt Lake City, Utah. They designed the NRHP-listed Alfred McCune Home and the Brooks Arcade. Hedges later worked for the surveyor-general of Utah for 17 years, and as its chief clerk for 10 years. He was a fellow of the American Institute of Architects.

Hedges married Clara Wells, the daughter of Daniel H. Wells, a Mormon official who served as the third mayor of Salt Lake City. They had two sons and a daughter. He died on February 25, 1914, in Salt Lake City, Utah, and he was buried in the Salt Lake City Cemetery.
