= Alfred McCune Home =

Historic house in Salt Lake City, Utah, U.S.

- Alfred W. McCune Mansion
- U.S. National Register of Historic Places
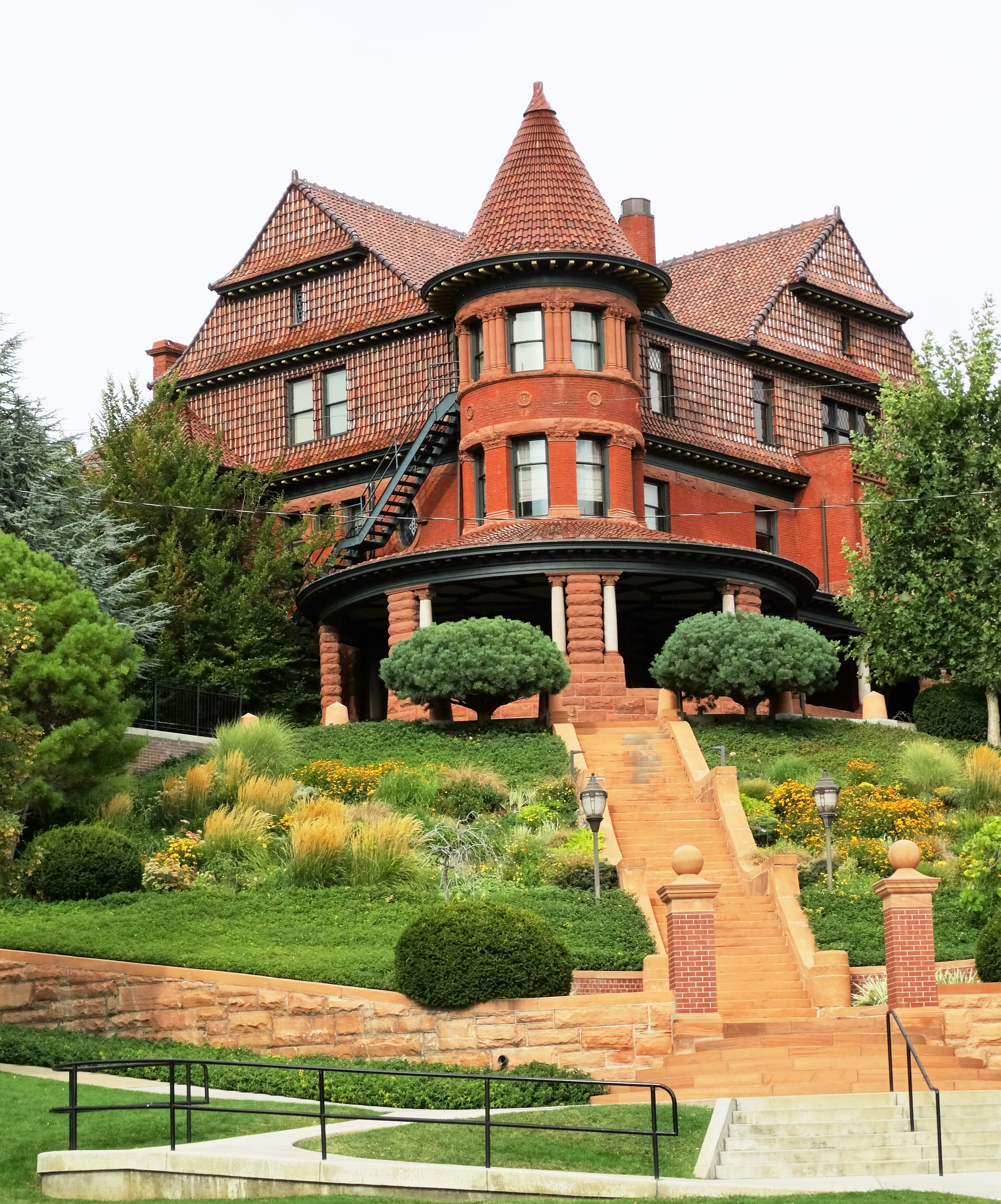
- Alfred McCune Home in 2015

- Location within Utah Location within the United States
- Location: 200 North Main St, Salt Lake City, Utah
- Coordinates: 40°46′26″N 111°53′26″W
- Area: less than one acre
- Built: 1872 (carriage house); 1900 (main house)
- Architect: Dallas, S.C.; Monheim, Henry
- NRHP reference No.: 74001937
- Added to NRHP: June 13, 1974

The Alfred McCune Home is one of the mansions on Capitol Hill in Salt Lake City, Utah, from around the turn of the 20th century. Built for Alfred W. McCune on the inclined south side of Capitol Hill at the northeast corner of 200 North Main Street, the mansion has 21 rooms and is on the National Register of Historic Places.

== About the owner ==
McCune was born in Calcutta, India, while his father, Matthew McCune, was stationed with the British Army and converted there to the Church of Jesus Christ of Latter-day Saints (LDS Church). The family immigrated to Utah Territory, settling in Farmington and then in Nephi. Alfred William McCune joined the LDS Church in Farmington in 1857. He and Elizabeth were childhood sweethearts and were married on July 1, 1872, in the Endowment House in Salt Lake City. Though McCune was not very active in church service, he donated a lot of money to it. According to LDS Church president Heber J. Grant's notes in his personal journal (April 1, 1927), McCune was always in good standing with the LDS Church.

By the time he was 21, McCune had contracted to build portions of the Utah Southern Railroad. He was a highly successful railroad builder, and became well-connected to other late 19th century millionaires. He was a partner in the Peruvian Cerro de Pasco mines along with J. P. Morgan, William Randolph Hearst, and Frederick William Vanderbilt. He owned business interests throughout Utah and in parts of Montana, British Columbia, and South America.

McCune was respected by his contemporaries for his integrity, his congenial personality, and his generous donations to worthy causes. He was also civic-minded and politically ambitious. In 1899, he ran for the Senate as the Democratic candidate against Republican incumbent Frank J. Cannon and several other candidates. When none was able to get a majority of votes, the election went down in history as the time when Utah was unable to select or send a senator to Washington. McCune later tried again for the Senate but was defeated by another mining and railroad magnate, Thomas Kearns.

== The House ==
The house was built in 1900. Elizabeth McCune had as many diversified interests as her husband had. She served in many prominent LDS Church positions and became close friends with Susa Young Gates, one of the daughters of Brigham Young. An active supporter of women's rights, Elizabeth attended the 1889 International Congress of Women in London. After being voted patron of the organization, Elizabeth was entertained by Queen Victoria at Windsor Castle.

McCune wanted his home to be an extravagant display and to this end he financed a two-year tour of America and Europe for his architect S. C. Dallas to study designs and techniques. The design chosen was a Gothic Revival plan with East Asian influence. The home is a replica of a house Alfred and Elizabeth saw while driving on Riverside Drive in New York City.

While the home was under construction, John R. Winder and McCune called upon the First Presidency of the LDS Church. McCune told them that he and his wife were building a new home and wished to rent the Gardo House for two or three years. The Gardo house had been used as a residence and offices for LDS Church leaders. Relieved to find a suitable new tenant, the church accepted his offer and set the rent at $150 per month.

The McCune home site was chosen to rise up impressively over the nearby streets, and little expense was spared on decoration. McCune had mahogany shipped from San Domingo, oak from England, and a rare white-grained mahogany from South Africa. The red roof tiles came from the Netherlands, and an enormous broad mirror wall was transported from Germany in a specially made railroad car. The walls were adorned with moiré silks, tapestries, and Russian leather. The exterior of the home was built of red Utah sandstone although some details like the lavish fireplaces used more exotic stone like Nubian marble. The home was completed in 1901 at a cost of one million dollars.

== History after the McCunes ==
McCune and his wife lived in the home until 1920. Prior to moving to Los Angeles, they donated it to the LDS Church with the intent that it be used as an official residence for church president Heber J. Grant. Grant did not like the idea of living in such an ornate residence, and so decided to turn it into a Music School. It was used as the McCune School of Music, which ended in 1957 and was replaced by the Brigham Young University Salt Lake City Center, until 1972 when it too was moved into a larger location. In 1973, the LDS Church sold the house to a group of Salt Lake City residents who were seeking to make the building into a cultural center.

It then became the Virginia Tanner Modern Dance School, which held lessons in the ballroom. Since then, the building has been privately owned, often used for wedding receptions and other short-term rentals.

Philip McCarthey, a shareholder of the Kearns-Tribune Corp., which published The Salt Lake Tribune until 1997, bought the building and began restoring it after the August 11, 1999, Salt Lake City Tornado, which had toppled one of the building's smokestacks. McCarthey completed the restoration in November 2001.

The house was listed on the National Register of Historic Places in 1974.

A carriage house on the property, designed by architect Henry Monheim, is also a contributing building; it was built for the Judge R. N. Baskin house built in 1872 previously on the site, and was retained.
