= Samuel Cleeton Dallas =

American architect

- Born: May 1, 1857; Salt Lake City, Utah, U.S.
- Died: October 3, 1920 (aged 63); Salt Lake City, Utah, U.S.
- Resting place: Salt Lake City Cemetery
- Education: University of Utah
- Occupation: Architect
- Spouse: Mattie King Dallas
- Children: 2 sons, 1 daughter

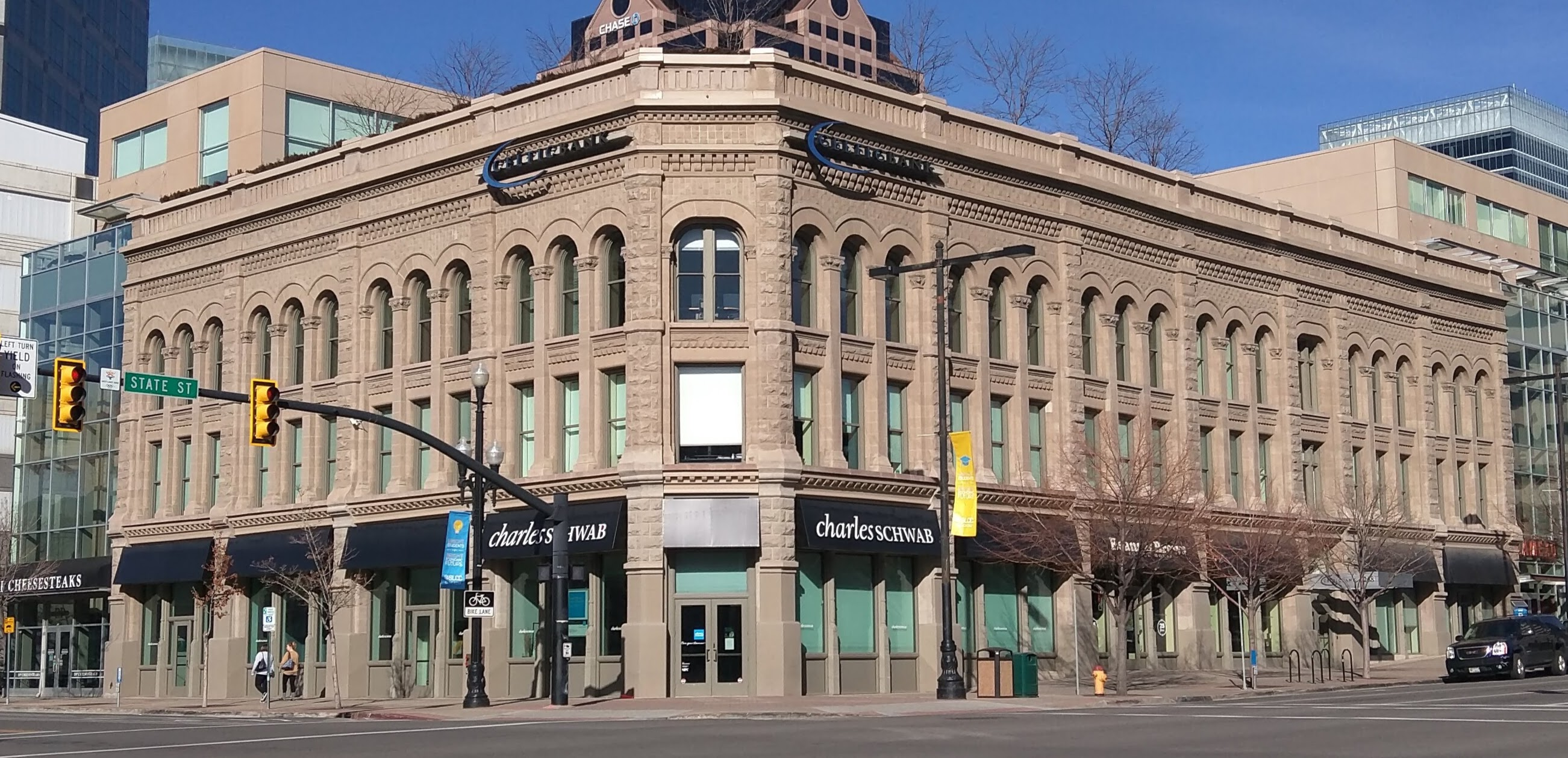
The Brooks Arcade in Salt Lake City, designed by Dallas & Hedges.

Samuel Cleeton Dallas (May 1, 1857 - October 3, 1920) was an American architect who designed many buildings in the state of Utah, including the NRHP-listed Alfred McCune Home and the Brooks Arcade with William S. Hedges. He also designed five buildings on the campus of the University of Utah.
