= Cleveland, Utah =

Town in the state of Utah, United States

- Town
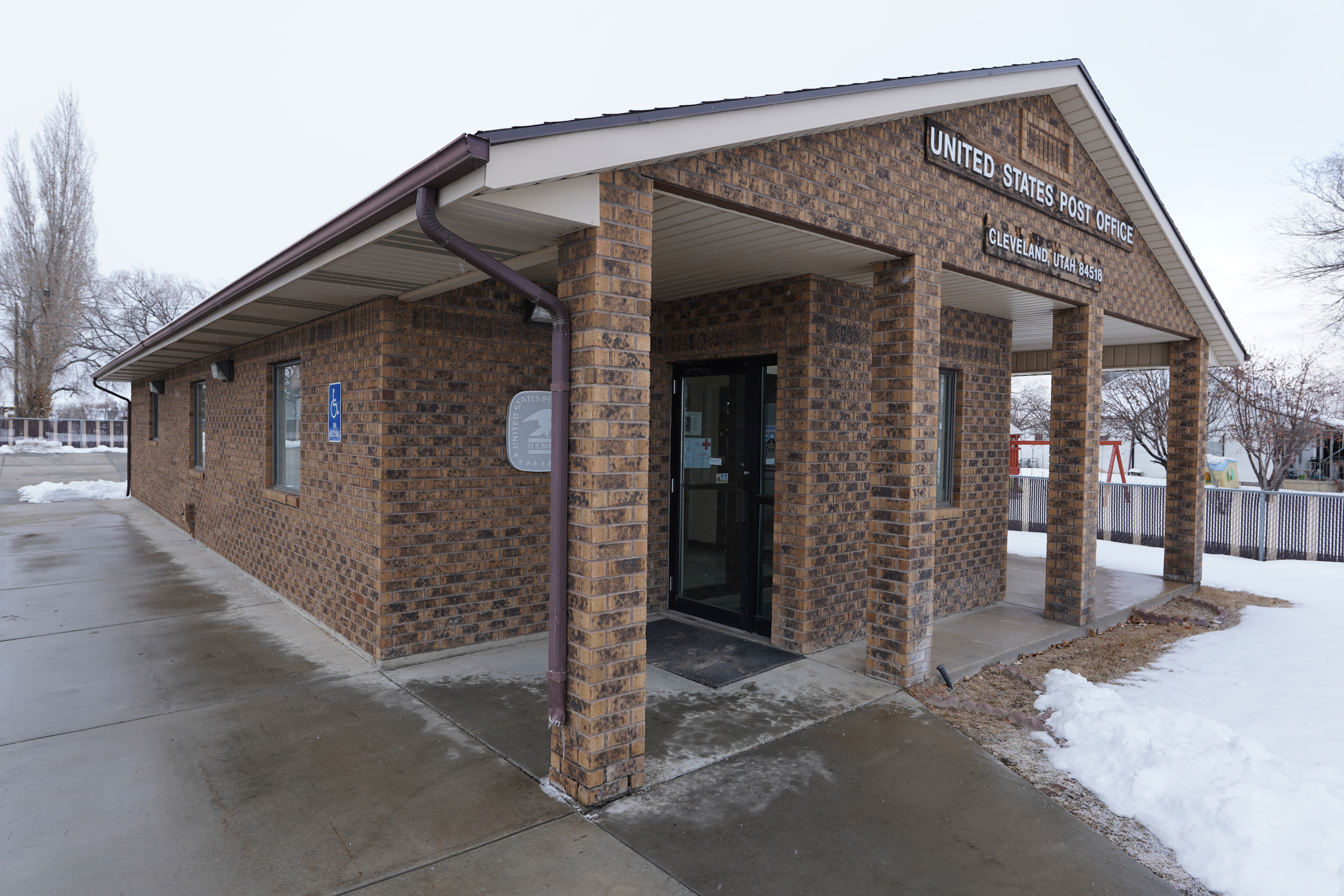
- Cleveland Post Office, February 2019

- Location in Emery County and the state of Utah

- Location of Utah in the United States
- Coordinates: 39°20′53″N 110°51′19″W
- Country: United States
- State: Utah
- County: Emery
- Settled: 1885
- Named for: Grover Cleveland

Area
  - Total: 0.86 sq mi (2.24 km^{2})
  - Land: 0.86 sq mi (2.24 km^{2})
  - Water: 0 sq mi (0.00 km^{2})
- Elevation: 5,722 ft (1,744 m)

Population (2020)
  - Total: 497
  - Density: 508.6/sq mi (196.39/km^{2})
- Time zone: UTC-7 (Mountain (MST))
  - Summer (DST): UTC-6 (MDT)
- ZIP code: 84518
- Area code: 435
- FIPS code: 49-14070
- GNIS feature ID: 1426712
- Website: www.clevelandtown.org

Cleveland is a town in Emery County, Utah, United States. As of the 2020 census, the town population was 497, up from 464 at the 2010 census.

== Geography ==
Cleveland is located in northwestern Emery County in a swale of land between the mountains and the desert. It is 7 miles (11 km) east of Huntington, 18 miles (29 km) south of Price, and 16 miles (26 km) northeast of Castle Dale, the Emery County seat. According to the United States Census Bureau, Cleveland has a total area of 0.85 square miles (2.2 km^{2}), all land.

== History ==
Cleveland was first settled in 1884 by Samuel Nelson Alger and Henry Sr. These two men took up homesteading, and soon afterward, 25 families joined them. Firm roots began to take hold, and gradually with hard work and persistence, Cleveland began to grow. These families were typically pioneers. Cleveland was named after Grover Cleveland, President of the United States in the 1880s.

The "old timers" claim that farms within the boundaries of Cleveland require less water than other farms in Emery County and have the most productive ground. Many founding fathers came to Cleveland because of good reports of plentiful grass and good homesteading. The reason that Cleveland was not settled sooner was the lack of a sufficient water source and supply.

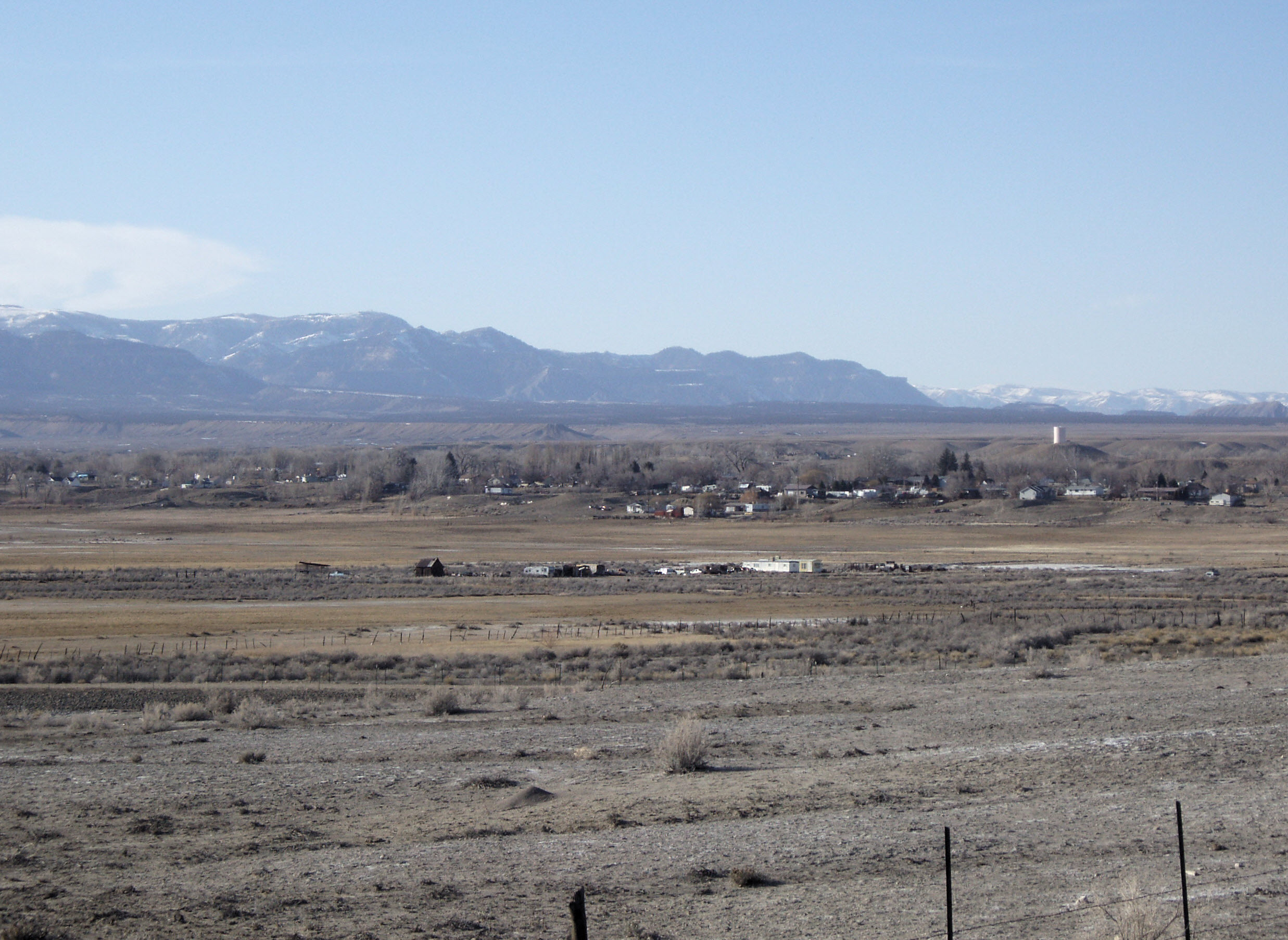
Cleveland as seen from the south, with the Wasatch Plateau in the distant left, March 2008

In 1890, a log school with plank benches was outgrown by 1893 when a frame building was built. Later a two-story section was added. The adobe brick school was built in 1912. Harry B. Mortensen and C. Leslie Bennett were instrumental in getting sports, music, and speech programs started for school students. A new school was built in 1976 and remodeled in 1989.

Cleveland's people loved social activities, and they had quite a few socials and parties. The departure of missionaries and servicemen was an exceptionally good reason for a get-together. In April 1910, Ernest E. Davis built a large opera house. Many dances and weddings were held there also. In April 1923, a silent movie picture machine was installed with a player piano for music. In 1928, a talking movie projector was installed. A roller skating rink was added in 1937. These buildings do not exist there today.

It had a population of 294 in 1930.

== Demographics ==
Historical population
| Census | Pop. | Note | %± |
|---|---|---|---|
| 1890 | 111 | | — |
| 1900 | 353 | | 218.0% |
| 1910 | 651 | | 84.4% |
| 1920 | 244 | | −62.5% |
| 1930 | 294 | | 20.5% |
| 1940 | 347 | | 18.0% |
| 1950 | 443 | | 27.7% |
| 1960 | 261 | | −41.1% |
| 1970 | 244 | | −6.5% |
| 1980 | 522 | | 113.9% |
| 1990 | 498 | | −4.6% |
| 2000 | 508 | | 2.0% |
| 2010 | 464 | | −8.7% |
| 2020 | 497 | | 7.1% |
U.S. Decennial Census

As of the census of 2000, there were 508 people, 164 households, and 139 families residing in the town. The population density was 568.2 people per square mile (220.4/km^{2}). There were 173 housing units at an average density of 193.5 per square mile (75.1/km^{2}). The racial makeup of the town was 97.24% White, 0.20% Native American, 0.20% from other races, and 2.36% from two or more races. Hispanic or Latino of any race were 0.59% of the population.

There were 164 households, out of which 48.2% had children under 18 living with them, 76.2% were married couples living together, 6.1% had a female householder with no husband present, and 15.2% were non-families. 15.2% of all households were made up of individuals, and 6.7% had someone living alone who was 65 years of age or older. The average household size was 3.10, and the average family size was 3.44.

In the town, the population was spread out, with 33.9% under 18, 10.8% from 18 to 24, 25.0% from 25 to 44, 20.3% from 45 to 64, and 10.0% who were 65 years of age or older. The median age was 30 years. For every 100 females, there were 92.4 males. For every 100 females aged 18 and over, there were 95.3 males.

The median income for a household in the town was $33,500, and the median income for a family was $43,000. Males had a median income of $33,750 versus $14,286 for females. The per capita income was $11,774. About 6.3% of families and 8.1% of the population were below the poverty line, including 8.5% of those under age 18 and 10.4% of those aged 65 or over.

== See also ==
- List of municipalities in Utah
