= Ferron, Utah =

City in Utah, United States

- City
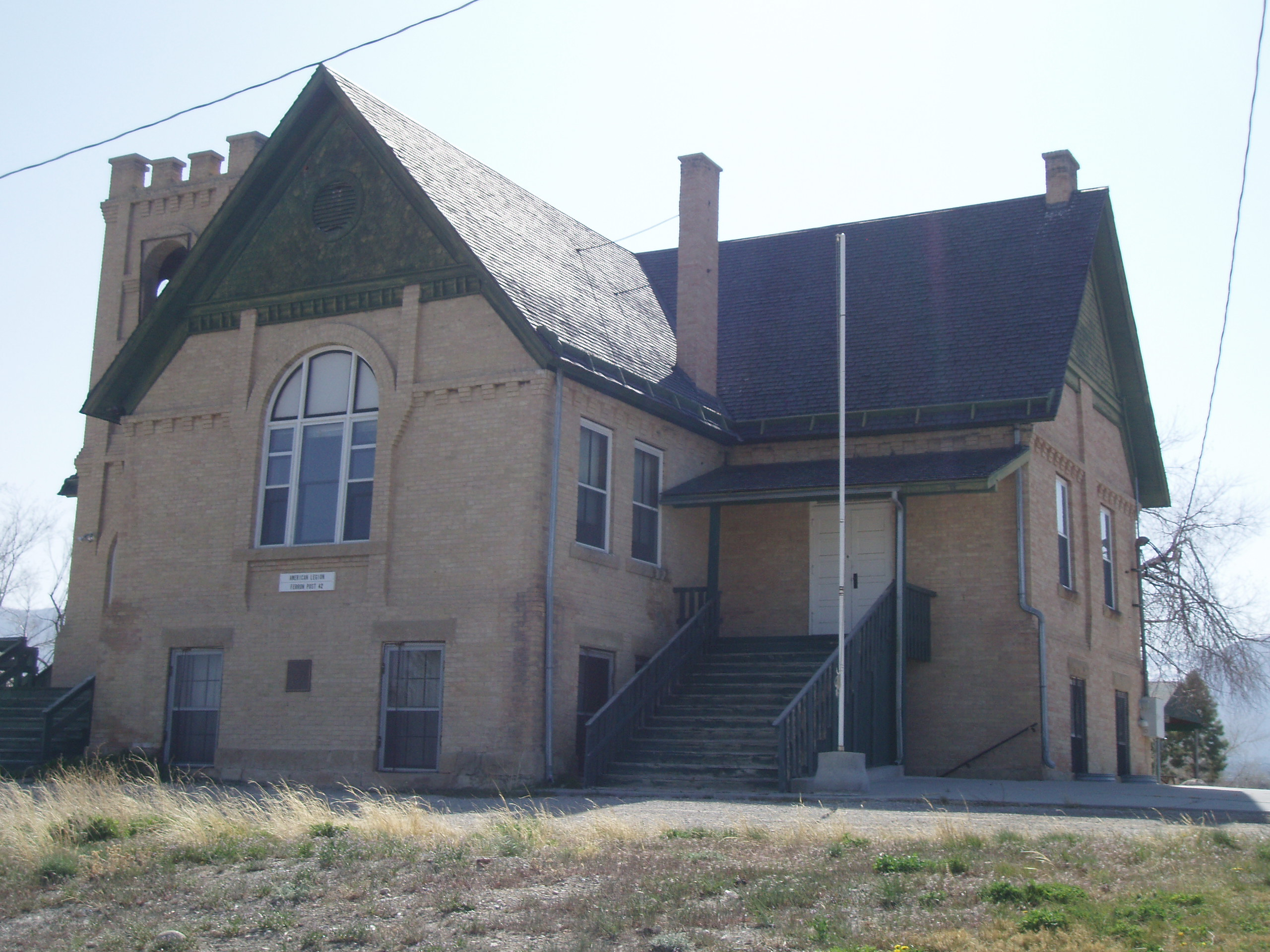
- Originally a Presbyterian school, this Ferron landmark has been home to American Legion Post 42 since 1942, April 2008
- Interactive map of Ferron, Utah
- Location within Utah Location within the United States
- Coordinates: 39°5′27″N 111°7′59″W
- Country: United States
- State: Utah
- County: Emery
- Settled: 1877
- Incorporated: 1900
- Named for: Augustus D. Ferron

Government
  - Type: Council-Manager Form

Area
  - Total: 2.33 sq mi (6.03 km^{2})
  - Land: 2.33 sq mi (6.03 km^{2})
- Elevation: 5,970 ft (1,820 m)

Population (2020)
  - Total: 1,474
  - Density: 627.5/sq mi (242.29/km^{2})
- Time zone: UTC-7 (Mountain (MST))
  - Summer (DST): UTC-6 (MDT)
- ZIP code: 84523
- Area code: 435
- FIPS code: 49-25180
- GNIS feature ID: 1441026
- Website: www.ferroncityutah.gov

Ferron (/ˈfɛrən/ FERR-ən) is a city in western Emery County, Utah, United States. The population was 1,474 at the 2020 census.

== History ==
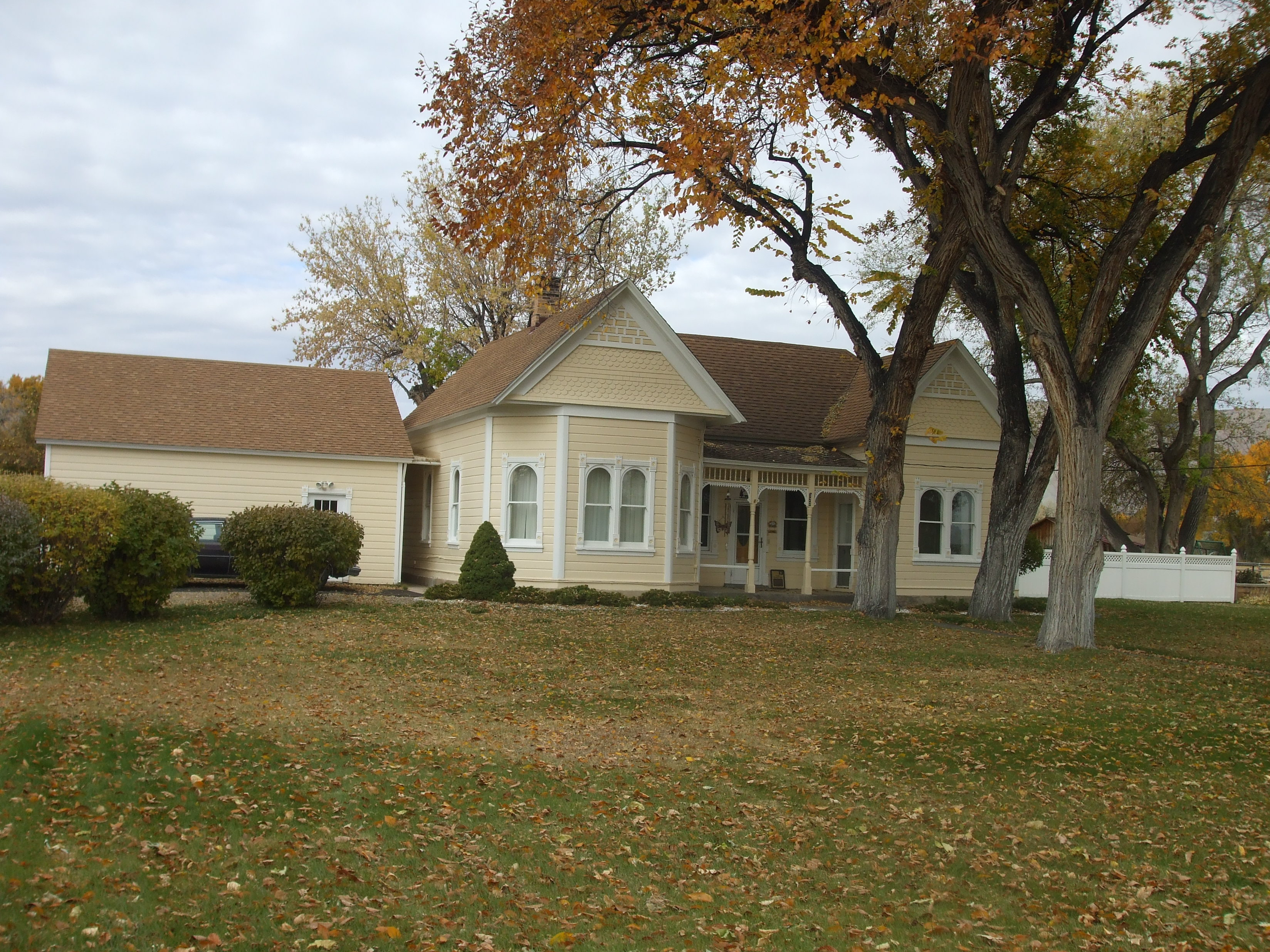
Singleton House in Ferron, October 2009

Ferron was originally populated by Mormon settlers in 1877. Three families responded to a call from the LDS Church asking to settle in the Castle Valley. They started on 15 November 1877 and arrived about 21 days later. The group spent time creating dugouts and later made their living in farming. Although settled in late 1877, the town received its name sometime in the late 1860s to early 1870s when a government surveyor was sent under the homestead act to survey the area. The surveyor's name was Augustus D Ferron, and, as the tale goes, they agreed to name the creek they camped by Ferron's Creek if he would agree to a "dunking" in the creek. He did so, and the creek was then known as Ferron's Creek. Later, when the town was settled, the "s" was dropped from the name, and the creek and town became known as "Ferron".

== Geography ==
Ferron is in western Emery County, along Utah State Route 10, which leads northeast 11 miles (18 km) to Castle Dale, the county seat, and southwest 14 miles (23 km) to Emery. According to the United States Census Bureau, Ferron has a total area of 2.2 square miles (5.6 km^{2}), all land.

== Demographics ==
Historical population
Census	Pop.	Note	%±
1890	299		—
1900	660		120.7%
1910	1,022		54.8%
1920	463		−54.7%
1930	508		9.7%
1940	515		1.4%
1950	478		−7.2%
1960	386		−19.2%
1970	663		71.8%
1980	1,718		159.1%
1990	1,606		−6.5%
2000	1,623		1.1%
2010	1,626		0.2%
2020	1,474		−9.3%
Source: U.S. Census Bureau

=== 2020 census ===
As of the 2020 census, Ferron had a population of 1,474. The median age was 39.0 years. 28.8% of residents were under the age of 18 and 20.0% of residents were 65 years of age or older. For every 100 females there were 98.7 males, and for every 100 females age 18 and over there were 96.4 males age 18 and over.

0.0% of residents lived in urban areas, while 100.0% lived in rural areas.

There were 544 households in Ferron, of which 31.8% had children under the age of 18 living in them. Of all households, 59.0% were married-couple households, 18.2% were households with a male householder and no spouse or partner present, and 19.7% were households with a female householder and no spouse or partner present. About 25.6% of all households were made up of individuals and 13.6% had someone living alone who was 65 years of age or older.

There were 594 housing units, of which 8.4% were vacant. The homeowner vacancy rate was 1.8% and the rental vacancy rate was 9.8%.

Racial composition as of the 2020 census
Race	Number	Percent
White	1,409	95.6%
Black or African American	0	0.0%
American Indian and Alaska Native	18	1.2%
Asian	2	0.1%
Native Hawaiian and Other Pacific Islander	0	0.0%
Some other race	10	0.7%
Two or more races	35	2.4%
Hispanic or Latino (of any race)	36	2.4%

=== 2000 census ===
As of the 2000 census, there were 1,623 people, 512 households, and 415 families residing in the city. The population density was 728.8 people per square mile (281.4 people/km^{2}). There were 585 housing units at an average density of 262.7 units per square mile (101.4 units/km^{2}). The racial makeup of the city was 97.78% White, 0.25% African American, 0.31% Native American, 0.31% Asian, 0.43% from other races, and 0.92% from two or more races. Hispanic or Latino of any race were 1.60% of the population.

There were 512 households, out of which 47.3% had children under the age of 18 living with them, 70.1% were married couples living together, 7.6% had a female householder with no husband present, and 18.9% were non-families. 17.8% of all households were made up of individuals, and 7.6% had someone living alone who was 65 years of age or older. The average household size was 3.06, and the average family size was 3.50.

In the city of Ferron, the population was spread out, with 35.6% under 18, 7.6% from 18 to 24, 22.7% from 25 to 44, 22.2% from 45 to 64, and 11.9% who were 65 years of age or older. The median age was 33 years. For every 100 females, there were 99.4 males. For every 100 females aged 18 and over, there were 91.7 males.

The median income for a household in the city was $38,625, and the median income for a family was $44,688. Males had a median income of $42,400 versus $21,458 for females. The per capita income for the city was $15,034. About 8.9% of families and 13.1% of the population were below the poverty line, including 16.8% of those under age 18 and 3.5% of those aged 65 or over.

== Climate ==
Climate data for Ferron, UT
Month	Jan	Feb	Mar	Apr	May	Jun	Jul	Aug	Sep	Oct	Nov	Dec	Year
Record high °F (°C)	63 (17)	68 (20)	81 (27)	86 (30)	96 (36)	100 (38)	102 (39)	104 (40)	97 (36)	88 (31)	77 (25)	64 (18)	104 (40)
Mean daily maximum °F (°C)	36.1 (2.3)	41.7 (5.4)	51.5 (10.8)	61.2 (16.2)	70.9 (21.6)	81.4 (27.4)	88.0 (31.1)	85.5 (29.7)	77.7 (25.4)	65.6 (18.7)	50.1 (10.1)	38.2 (3.4)	62.3 (16.8)
Mean daily minimum °F (°C)	11.5 (−11.4)	17.6 (−8.0)	25.9 (−3.4)	33.6 (0.9)	42.8 (6.0)	51.6 (10.9)	58.5 (14.7)	56.0 (13.3)	47.2 (8.4)	35.6 (2.0)	23.4 (−4.8)	13.8 (−10.1)	34.8 (1.5)
Record low °F (°C)	−17 (−27)	−15 (−26)	1 (−17)	13 (−11)	22 (−6)	27 (−3)	39 (4)	35 (2)	22 (−6)	8 (−13)	−4 (−20)	−21 (−29)	−21 (−29)
Average precipitation inches (mm)	0.66 (17)	0.60 (15)	0.57 (14)	0.51 (13)	0.69 (18)	0.50 (13)	0.87 (22)	1.01 (26)	0.95 (24)	0.92 (23)	0.52 (13)	0.54 (14)	8.34 (212)
Average snowfall inches (cm)	8.2 (21)	6.4 (16)	3.2 (8.1)	1.0 (2.5)	0.1 (0.25)	0 (0)	0 (0)	0.1 (0.25)	0.1 (0.25)	0.6 (1.5)	2.1 (5.3)	5.6 (14)	27.4 (69.15)
Source: http://www.wrcc.dri.edu/cgi-bin/cliMAIN.pl?ut2798

04/20/1897 to 06/10/2016

== See also ==
- List of cities and towns in Utah
