= Castle Dale, Utah =

City in Utah, United States

- City
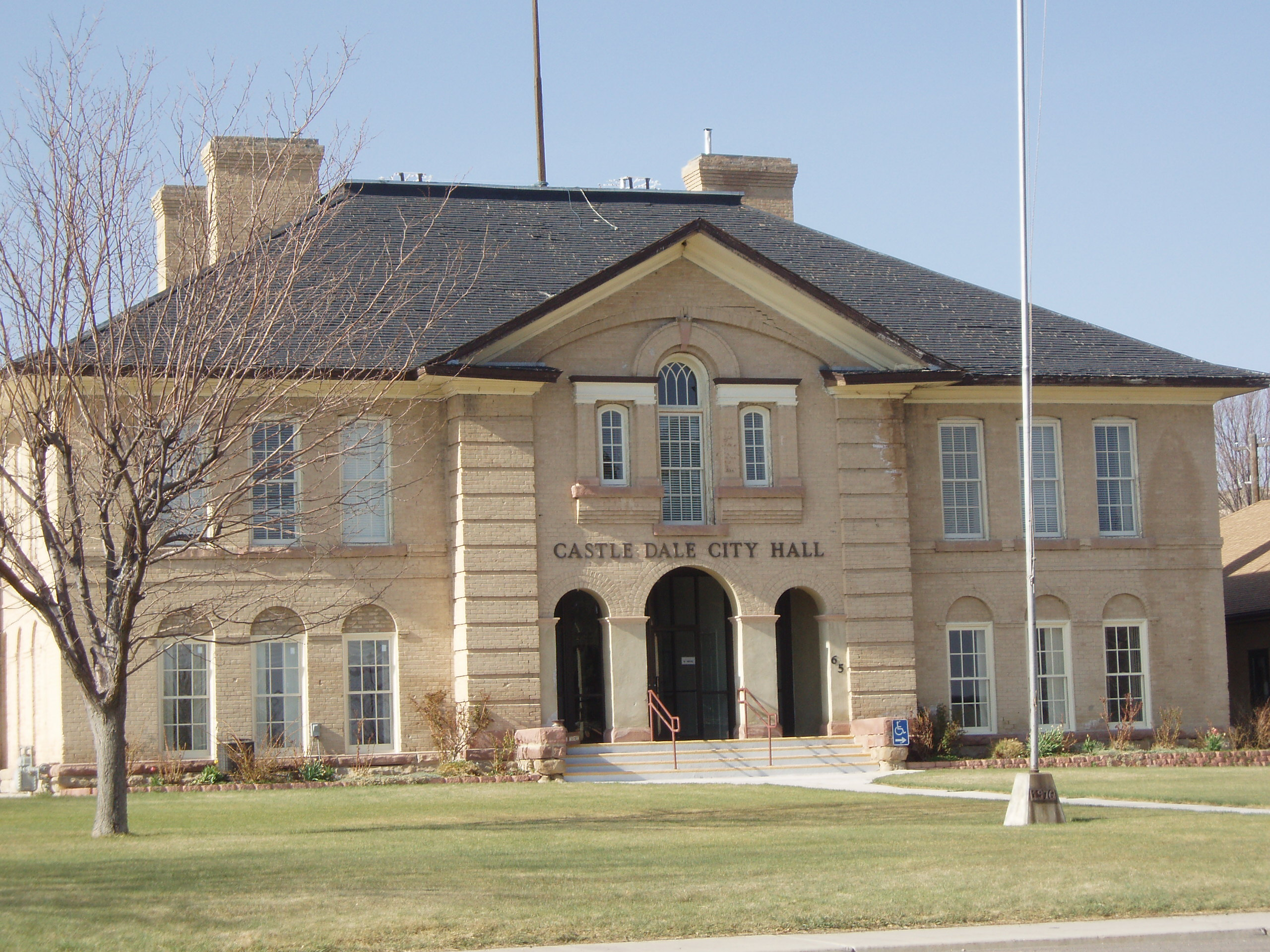
- Castle Dale's city hall

- Location within Emery County and the State of Utah

- Location of Utah in the United States
- Coordinates: 39°12′57″N 111°1′15″W
- Country: United States
- State: Utah
- County: Emery
- Settled: 1877
- Incorporated: 1900

Area
  - Total: 2.24 sq mi (5.79 km^{2})
  - Land: 2.24 sq mi (5.79 km^{2})
  - Water: 0 sq mi (0.00 km^{2})
- Elevation: 5,680 ft (1,730 m)

Population (2020)
  - Total: 1,492
  - Density: 667/sq mi (258/km^{2})
- Time zone: UTC-7 (Mountain (MST))
  - Summer (DST): UTC-6 (MDT)
- ZIP code: 84513
- Area code: 435
- FIPS code: 49-10660
- GNIS feature ID: 1426380
- Website: www.emerycounty.com/castledale/castledale.htm

Castle Dale is a city in northwestern Emery County, Utah, United States. The population was 1,492 at the 2020 census. It is the county seat of Emery County.

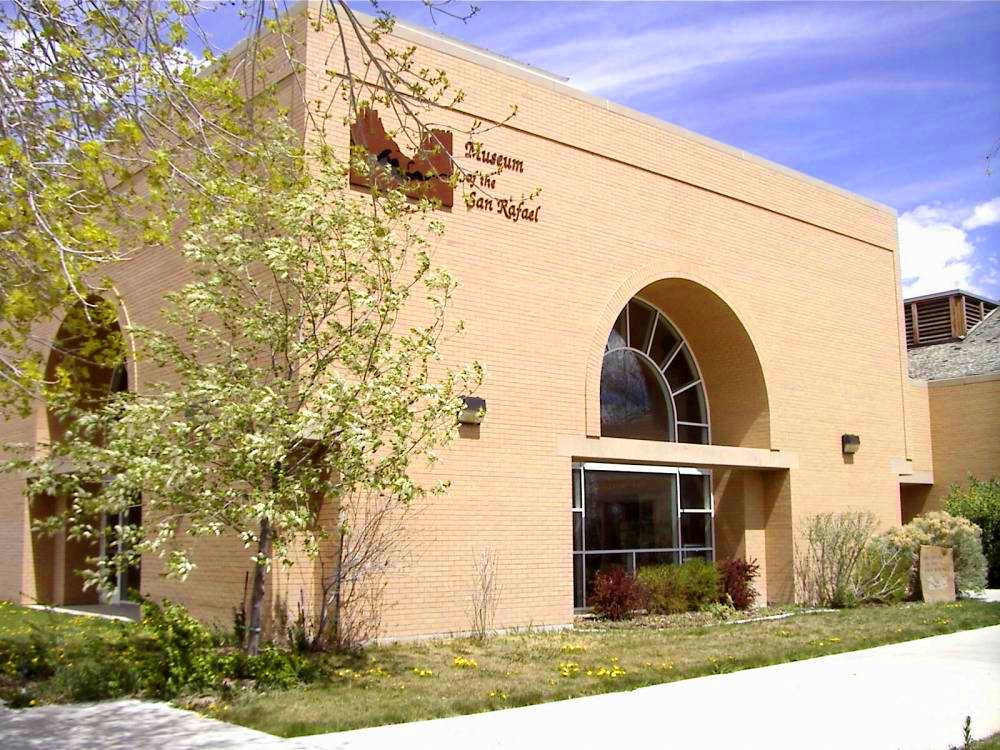
Museum of the San Rafael

== History ==
The first settlement at Castle Dale was made in 1879. The community incorporated as the Town of Castle Dale in 1900, and became Castle Dale City, a city of the third class, in July 1920.

== Geography ==
Castle Dale lies on the north side of Cottonwood Creek, a tributary of the San Rafael River, in Castle Valley.

According to the United States Census Bureau, the city has a total area of 2.2 square miles (5.6 km^{2}), all land.

Utah State Route 10 passes through the center of town, leading northeast 31 miles (50 km) to Price and southwest 37 miles (60 km) to Interstate 70.

== Demographics ==
Historical population
Census	Pop.	Note	%±
1890	505		—
1900	559		10.7%
1910	693		24.0%
1920	715		3.2%
1930	713		−0.3%
1940	841		18.0%
1950	715		−15.0%
1960	617		−13.7%
1970	541		−12.3%
1980	1,910		253.0%
1990	1,704		−10.8%
2000	1,657		−2.8%
2010	1,630		−1.6%
2020	1,492		−8.5%
U.S. Decennial Census

=== 2020 census ===
As of the 2020 census, Castle Dale had a population of 1,492. The median age was 38.2 years, with 28.8% of residents under the age of 18 and 17.4% aged 65 or older. For every 100 females there were 97.1 males, and for every 100 females age 18 and over there were 91.7 males.

0.0% of residents lived in urban areas, while 100.0% lived in rural areas.

There were 534 households in Castle Dale, of which 34.5% had children under the age of 18 living in them. Of all households, 62.5% were married-couple households, 12.2% were households with a male householder and no spouse or partner present, and 20.6% were households with a female householder and no spouse or partner present. About 20.4% of all households were made up of individuals and 11.3% had someone living alone who was 65 years of age or older.

There were 566 housing units, of which 5.7% were vacant. The homeowner vacancy rate was 1.6% and the rental vacancy rate was 3.1%.

Racial composition as of the 2020 census
Race	Number	Percent
White	1,406	94.2%
Black or African American	0	0.0%
American Indian and Alaska Native	7	0.5%
Asian	7	0.5%
Native Hawaiian and Other Pacific Islander	1	0.1%
Some other race	12	0.8%
Two or more races	59	4.0%
Hispanic or Latino (of any race)	67	4.5%

=== 2000 census ===
As of the 2000 census, there were 1,657 people, 508 households, and 420 families residing in the city. The population density was 887.5 people per square mile (342.1/km^{2}). There were 618 housing units at an average density of 331.0 per square mile (127.6/km^{2}). The racial makeup of the city was 95.47% White, 0.06% African American, 0.66% Native American, 0.54% Asian, 0.18% Pacific Islander, 0.91% from other races, and 2.17% from two or more races. Hispanic or Latino of any race were 2.17% of the population.

There were 508 households, out of which 49.2% had children under the age of 18 living with them, 72.6% were married couples living together, 7.1% had a female householder with no husband present, and 17.3% were non-families. 15.6% of all households were made up of individuals, and 7.9% had someone living alone who was 65 years of age or older. The average household size was 3.22, and the average family size was 3.60.

In the city, the population was spread out, with 37.2% under 18, 9.7% from 18 to 24, 23.5% from 25 to 44, 21.5% from 45 to 64, and 8.1% who were 65 years of age or older. The median age was 28 years. For every 100 females, there were 105.8 males. For every 100 females aged 18 and over, there were 100.4 males.

The median income for a household in the city was $44,185, and the median income for a family was $48,603. Males had a median income of $40,515 versus $20,294 for females. The per capita income for the city was $14,175. About 6.7% of families and 9.5% of the population were below the poverty line, including 12.4% of those under age 18 and 5.6% of those aged 65 or over.

== Climate ==
Castle Dale has a fairly typical Intermountain West cool semi-arid climate (Köppen BSk). Summer afternoons are hot with intense sunshine, although mornings are pleasantly cool, while winter mornings are frigid even though all but 14.2 afternoons top freezing in an average year. Precipitation, owing to the rain shadows of mountains to the south (blocking monsoonal storms in summer) and west (blocking Pacific storms in winter), is light throughout the year, although there is a slight peak in late summer. The wettest month since record began has been October 2006 with 3.80 inches or 96.5 millimetres, the wettest calendar year 1965 with 14.28 inches or 362.7 millimetres, and the driest 1956 with 3.87 inches or 98.3 millimetres. The dryness of the climate limits snowfall to 16.6 inches or 0.42 metres, with the snowiest month being January 1980 with 24.2 inches or 0.61 metres, and the snowiest year from July 1936 to June 1937 with 47.0 inches or 1.19 metres.

Climate data for Castle Dale 1991-2020, extremes 1899-
Month	Jan	Feb	Mar	Apr	May	Jun	Jul	Aug	Sep	Oct	Nov	Dec	Year
Record high °F (°C)	67 (19)	70 (21)	83 (28)	89 (32)	97 (36)	104 (40)	107 (42)	103 (39)	102 (39)	88 (31)	81 (27)	67 (19)	107 (42)
Mean daily maximum °F (°C)	40.4 (4.7)	46.9 (8.3)	58.4 (14.7)	65.7 (18.7)	74.6 (23.7)	85.3 (29.6)	91.4 (33.0)	88.6 (31.4)	81.1 (27.3)	68.1 (20.1)	53.0 (11.7)	41.0 (5.0)	66.2 (19.0)
Mean daily minimum °F (°C)	9.7 (−12.4)	16.1 (−8.8)	24.7 (−4.1)	30.8 (−0.7)	39.5 (4.2)	47.0 (8.3)	54.1 (12.3)	52.2 (11.2)	42.8 (6.0)	31.7 (−0.2)	20.0 (−6.7)	11.2 (−11.6)	31.7 (−0.2)
Record low °F (°C)	−34 (−37)	−35 (−37)	−7 (−22)	5 (−15)	13 (−11)	25 (−4)	29 (−2)	30 (−1)	19 (−7)	0 (−18)	−10 (−23)	−28 (−33)	−35 (−37)
Average precipitation inches (mm)	0.63 (16)	0.64 (16)	0.59 (15)	0.54 (14)	0.72 (18)	0.45 (11)	0.59 (15)	0.92 (23)	1.03 (26)	0.97 (25)	0.46 (12)	0.47 (12)	8.01 (203)
Average snowfall inches (cm)	5.5 (14)	3.3 (8.4)	1.4 (3.6)	0.2 (0.51)	trace	0 (0)	0 (0)	0 (0)	0 (0)	0.1 (0.25)	1.2 (3.0)	4.9 (12)	16.6 (41.76)
Average precipitation days (≥ 0.01 in)	4.8	4.7	3.8	4.4	5.0	3.3	5.2	7.3	5.6	5.0	3.3	4.6	57.0
Average snowy days (≥ 0.1 in)	2.4	2.0	0.6	0.2	0.0	0	0	0	0	0.1	0.6	2.2	8.1
Source 1: NCEI
Source 2: xmacis

== Education ==
Emery County School District operates public schools in the county.

== See also ==
- List of cities and towns in Utah
