= The Energy Loop: Huntington/Eccles Canyons Scenic Byway =

The Energy Loop: Huntington/Eccles Canyons Scenic Byway

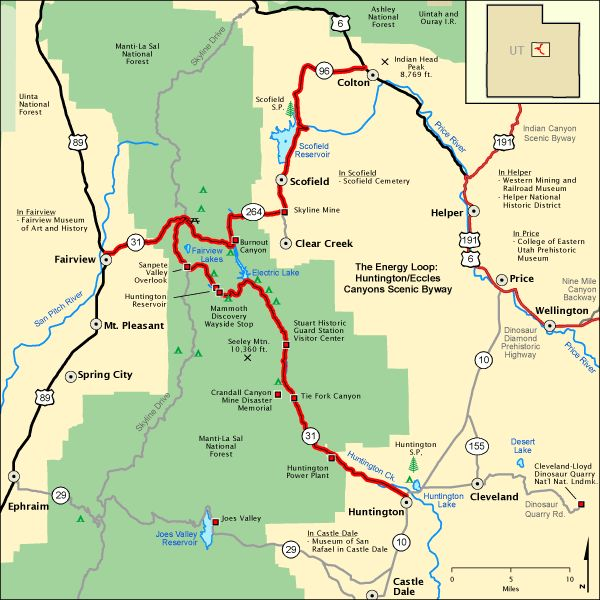

Route information
- Maintained by UDOT
- Length: 82.882 mi (133.386 km)
- Existed: 1990–present
- Component highways: SR-31; SR-96; SR-264

Major junctions
- West end: US 89 in Fairview
- East end: SR-10 in Huntington (south); US 6 near Colton (north)

Location
- Country: United States
- State: Utah
- Counties: Utah, Carbon, Emery, Sanpete

Highway system
- Scenic Byways; National; National Forest; BLM; NPS; Utah State Highway System; Interstate; US; State; Minor; Scenic

The Energy Loop: Huntington/Eccles Canyons Scenic Byway is a National Scenic Byway in the state of Utah. It spans approximately 83 miles (134 km) as it travels from Fairview through the Manti-La Sal National Forest southeast to Huntington via Huntington Canyon, and northeast to near Colton via Eccles Canyon.

== Route description ==
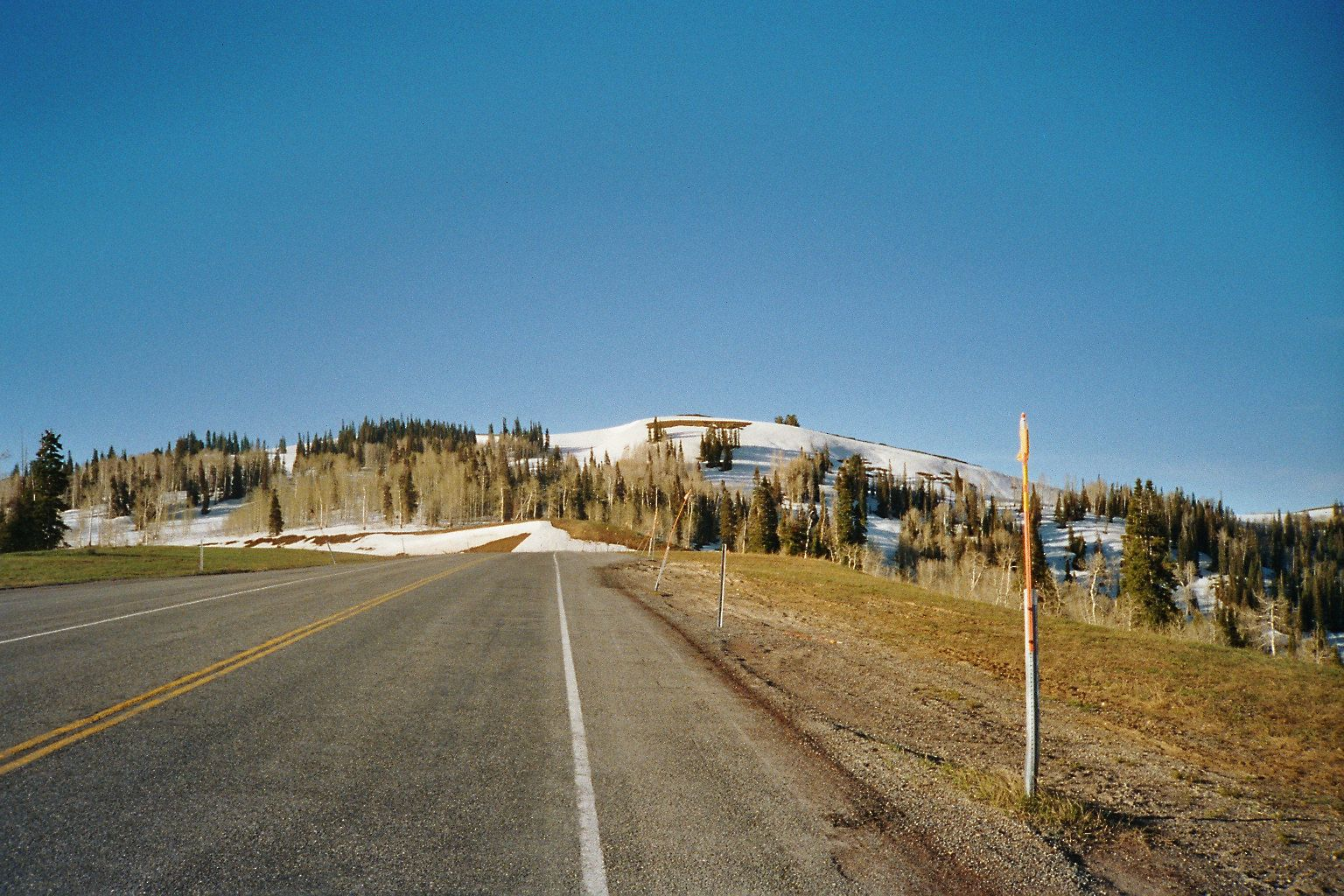
Huntington/Eccles Canyons Scenic Byway, June 2005

The route begins in Fairview at the intersection of US-89 and SR-31 following SR-31 eastward and immediately connects with the north end of SR-231. As it exits the city, it turns northeast to follow Cottonwood Creek towards and into Fairview Canyon, about 2 miles (3.2 km) from the beginning of the route. It follows the canyon for another 6–7 miles, entering the Manti-La Sal National Forest, until it climbs out of the top end of the canyon at about 8,800 feet (2,700 m) altitude. From this point, the byway splits in two.

The south branch continues to follow SR-31, climbing up to over 9,600 feet (2,900 m) elevation before dropping down to the east-southeast as it passes Huntington Reservoir, Cleveland Reservoir, and turning to the northeast towards Electric Lake. At this point, the route turns to the southeast, following Huntington Canyon and Huntington Creek downwards, eventually exiting the national forest and the canyon and ending in the city of Huntington, a mile southwest of Huntington State Park.

The North branch turns onto SR-264, which travels eastward towards the north end of Electric Lake, where it turns north to go up Upper Huntington Canyon. After about 3 miles (4.8 km), the route turns east again and climbs out of the Upper Huntington Canyon, and crosses over to Eccles Canyon, following Eccles Creek down. After about 6 miles (9.7 km), the canyon and the route turn back to the north again, passing through the town of Scofield, and passing by Scofield Reservoir and state park. It continues on past the north end of the reservoir for a few more miles before turning to the east yet again, ending northwest of Price Canyon near Colton.

== History ==
For the histories of this route's constituent highways prior to its scenic byway designation, refer to:

- SR-31
- SR-96
- SR-264

This route was designated a Utah Scenic Byway in 1990, a National Forest Scenic Byway on February 6, 1991 (as Huntington Canyon Scenic Byway, Eccles Canyon Scenic Byway), and a National Scenic Byway on June 15, 2000.

== Major intersections ==
County	Location	mi	km	Destinations	Notes
Sanpete	Fairview	0.000	0.000	US 89 (State Street) – Mount Pleasant, Provo	Western terminus (as SR-31)
Sanpete		8.576	13.802	SR-264 (Eccles Canyon Scenic Byway) – Scofield	Route splits into north and south branches
1.000 mi = 1.609 km; 1.000 km = 0.621 mi

=== North branch ===
County	Location	mi	km	Destinations	Notes
Sanpete		8.576	13.802	SR-31 (Huntington Canyon Scenic Byway) – Huntington, Fairview	North branch begins (as SR-264)
Carbon		23.949	38.542	SR-96 – Clear Creek, Scofield	SR-264 ends; route continues on SR-96
Utah		43.712	70.348	US 6 – Price, Provo	Eastern terminus of north branch
1.000 mi = 1.609 km; 1.000 km = 0.621 mi

=== South branch ===
County	Location	mi	km	Destinations	Notes
Sanpete		8.576	13.802	SR-264 (Eccles Canyon Scenic Byway) – Scofield	South branch begins (as SR-31)
Emery	Huntington	47.746	76.840	SR-10 (Main Street) – Castle Dale, Price	Eastern terminus of south branch
1.000 mi = 1.609 km; 1.000 km = 0.621 mi

== See also ==
- List of Utah Scenic Byways
