= Utah State Route 264 =

State highway in Utah, United States

State Route 264
- The Energy Loop

Route information
- Maintained by UDOT
- Length: 15.373 mi (24.740 km)
- Existed: 1985–present

Major junctions
- West end: SR-31 near Fairview
- East end: SR-96 near Scofield

Location
- Country: United States
- State: Utah

Highway system
- Utah State Highway System; Interstate; US; State; Minor; Scenic
← SR-262	→ SR-265

State Route 264 is a state highway in central Utah that connects Sanpete County to Carbon County through Flat Canyon, Boulger Canyon, Upper Huntington Canyon, and Eccles Canyon. It is part of The Energy Loop, a National Scenic Byway.

== Route description ==
From its western terminus at SR-31, SR-264 heads southeast until it reaches Emery County, where it turns to the north. Afterwards it turns back to the east through Carbon County to its eastern terminus at SR-96.

== History ==
The western portion of SR-264, from SR-31 east to the Sanpete-Emery County line, near the north end of Electric Lake, was added to the state highway system in 1915, and became part of SR-31 in 1927. Due to the creation of Electric Lake, a new alignment for SR-31 was designated in 1976, and present SR-264 was given back to the county. The Utah Transportation Commission restored that roadway to the state highway system in 1985 when it created SR-264 along its present route.

== Major intersections ==
County	Location	mi	km	Destinations	Notes
Sanpete		0.000	0.000	SR-31 – Huntington, Fairview	Western terminus
Carbon		15.373	24.740	SR-96 – Clear Creek, Scofield	Eastern terminus
1.000 mi = 1.609 km; 1.000 km = 0.621 mi
