= Utah State Route 31 =

State highway in Utah, United States

State Route 31
- Huntington Canyon Scenic Byway

Route information
- Maintained by UDOT
- Length: 47.746 mi (76.840 km)
- Existed: 1915 as a state highway; 1927 as SR-31–present

Major junctions
- West end: US 89 at Fairview
- SR-264 near Fairview
- East end: SR-10 in Huntington

Location
- Country: United States
- State: Utah

Highway system
- Utah State Highway System; Interstate; US; State; Minor; Scenic
← SR-30	→ SR-32

State Route 31 (SR-31) is a state highway in Sanpete and Emery Counties in the U.S. state of Utah. It runs for 47.746 miles (76.840 km) from US-89 at Fairview to SR-10 in Huntington. The highway has been designated as part of The Energy Loop, a National Scenic Byway.

== Route description ==
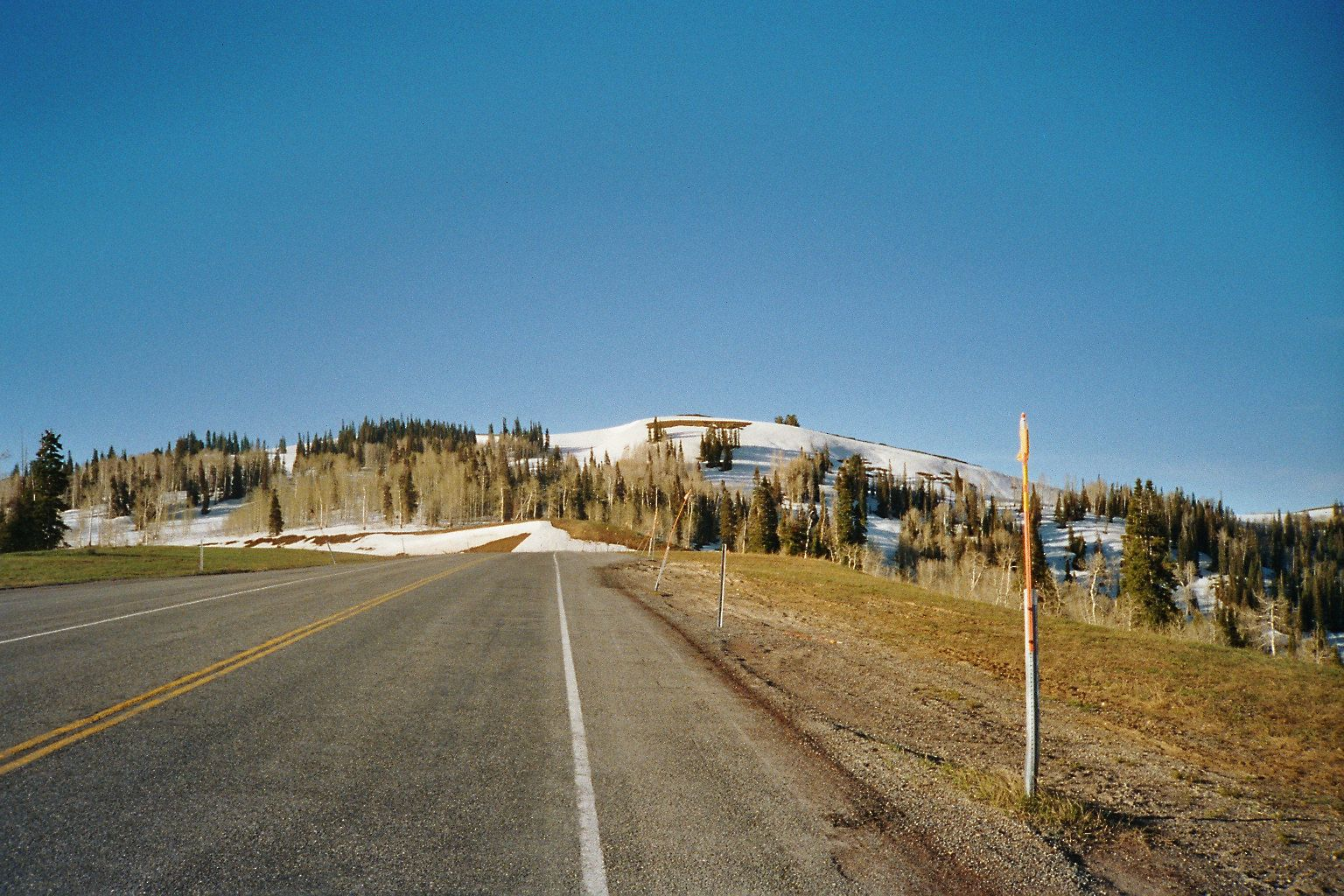
SR-31, with early summer snow patches, June 2005

SR-31 begins at an intersection with US-89 at Fairview and runs east northeast for approximately 10 miles (16 km), then turns southeast for the remainder of the route, terminating at an intersection with SR-10 at Huntington.

Just off State Route 31, about 15 miles (24 km) west north-west of Huntington, is Crandall Canyon, location of the Crandall Canyon coal mine. On Monday, August 6, 2007, at 2:48 A.M., the mine collapsed, trapping and killing six workers inside. A second collapse on August 16, 2007, killed a Mine Safety and Health Administration investigator and two more miners, bringing the total to nine.

== History ==
The road from SR-32 (by 1926 US-89) in Fairview east to the Sanpete-Emery County line, near the present north end of Electric Lake, was added to the state highway system in 1915. It was extended southeast to SR-10 in Huntington in 1918, and in 1927 the state legislature numbered the Fairview-Huntington highway as SR-31. A major realignment was made in 1976, when Electric Lake was created and a new route was built to the west. The old route in Sanpete County became a county road, and is now part of SR-264, but the majority of the road in Emery County was beneath the lake and thus abandoned.

== Major intersections ==
County	Location	mi	km	Destinations	Notes
Sanpete	Fairview	0.000	0.000	US 89 (State Street) – Mount Pleasant, Provo	Western terminus
Sanpete	Fairview	0.085	0.137	SR-231 south (State Street) to US 89 south	
Sanpete		8.576	13.802	SR-264 (Eccles Canyon Scenic Byway) – Scofield	
Emery	Huntington	47.746	76.840	SR-10 (Main Street) – Castle Dale, Price	Eastern terminus
1.000 mi = 1.609 km; 1.000 km = 0.621 mi

== See also ==
- List of state highways in Utah
