= Aspen Cove at Scofield =

Coordinates: 39°48′18″N 111°09′10″W

Aspen Cove at Scofield is a 632-acre (256 ha) recreational property cabin development on the northwest end of Scofield reservoir in the state of Utah. Aspen Cove is primarily a recreation destination. The 2010 population is 7 year round residents and there are over 50 cabins used as second homes. Aspen Cove is less than a 10 mile drive to the town of Scofield, 35 miles to Price, 50 miles to Spanish Fork, and 100 miles to Salt Lake City, Utah.

== History ==
Aspen Cove at Scofield is a Mountain Home Development in Carbon County, Utah. In 1996-1997, the Nelson Family received approval from Carbon County for a total of 158 cabin lots. In 2010, there are 130 cabin lots developed in six phases and almost 60 cabins built. The first phase consisting of 48 lots was completed in October 1997. Subsequent phases have been completed through Phase 6 in 2008. Aspen Cove is a gated community and access to the development is through the Scofield State Park (Madsen Bay Unit) on the very north end of Scofield Reservoir. The State Park boat launch is only 1500′ away from the electronic-gated entrance to Aspen Cove.

== Recreation ==
Aspen Cove at Scofield sits on the north end of the Scofield valley (nicknamed “Pleasant Valley”). The 2800 acre Scofield Reservoir and surrounding area has lake, river, and stream fishing (also ice fishing in the winter). Scofield reservoir is also used for boating for water skiing, tubing, and boarding. There are also many miles of trails and play areas for ATV and horseback riding as well as snowmobiling in the winter in the nearby Skyline Drive located in the Manti-La Sal National Forest. The National Forest also has abundant wildlife and areas for hunting, hiking and mountain biking.

== Geography ==
This mountain property has varied terrain including cabin lots and dedicated open spaces that have aspen groves, grassy meadows, or mountain, valley, and lake views. The recreational lots in Aspen Cove range in size from 1.29-12.91 acres. Aspen Cove at Scofield sits on a mountain knoll on the north side of Scofield reservoir and is just east of the Manti-La Sal National Forest. The elevation of Aspen Cove is 7640' to 8035'.
