= Utah State Route 231 (disambiguation) =

Utah State Route 231 may refer to:

- Utah State Route 231 (1941-1945), a planned and designated, but never built, state highway in Salt Lake City, Utah, United States, that was to connect U.S. Route 91 (now U.S. Route 89) with Fort Douglas, via the north side of Ensign Peak
- Utah State Route 231 (1945-1953), a former state highway in western Weber County, Utah, United States, that formed a loop around the Ogden Municipal Airport
- Utah State Route 231, a very short state highway in northern Fairview, Utah, United States
