= San Rafael River =

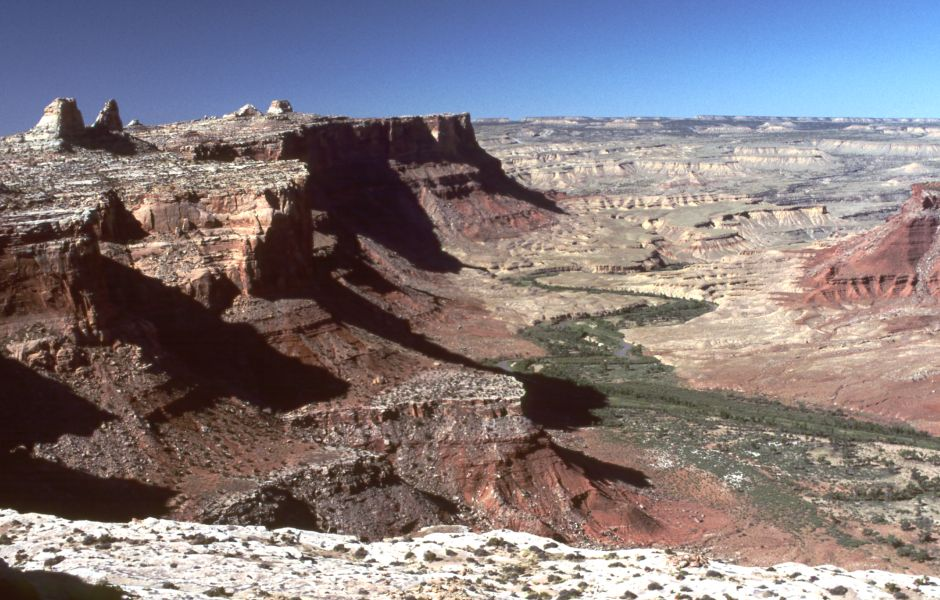
- San Rafael River Gorge

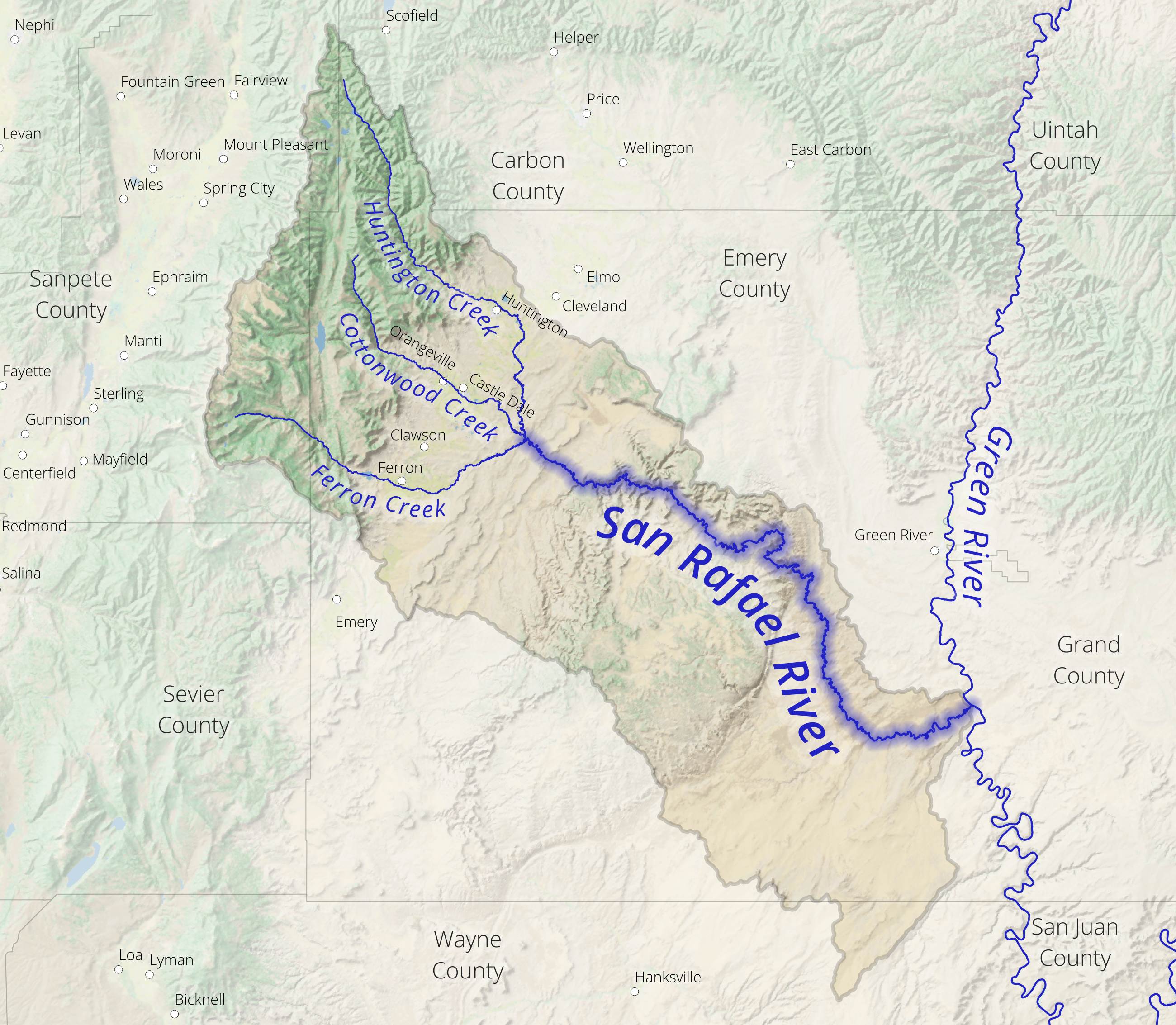
- Location of the San Rafael River within Utah

Location
- Country: United States
- State: Utah

Physical characteristics
- Mouth
  - coordinates: 38°46′31″N 110°06′17″W
- Length: 90 miles (140 km)

The San Rafael River is a tributary of the Green River, approximately 90 miles (140 km) long, in east central Utah, United States. The river flows across a sparsely populated arid region of the Colorado Plateau, and is known for the isolated, scenic gorge through which it flows.

== Description ==
The river rises in northwestern Emery County, approximately 5 miles (8.0 km) southeast of Castle Dale, by the confluence of Cottonwood, Huntington and Ferron creeks, which provide its headwaters in the Wasatch Plateau region. It flows east-southeast along the north side of the Coal Cliffs and the prominent anticline called the San Rafael Swell, passing north of Window Butte (Window Blind Peak) and through two narrow slot canyons in Coconino Sandstone called the Upper and Lower Black Box. This area is known as the San Rafael Gorge, sometimes called the "Little Grand Canyon". (Actually, the "Little Grand Canyon" is a few miles upstream where the San Rafael passes between the Wedge on the north and Sid's Mountain and No Man's Mountain on the south). After passing through the San Rafael Reef it enters the 15 miles (24 km) long San Rafael Valley, where it joins the Green River from the west, approximately 10 miles (16 km) south of the town of Green River. The San Rafael is the last major tributary of the Green River before it joins the Colorado River in Canyonlands National Park.

Diversion tunnels at the headwaters of the river in the Manti-La Sal National Forest provide irrigation water to Sanpete County on the west side of the Wasatch Plateau.

== See also ==
- List of rivers of Utah
- List of tributaries of the Colorado River
