= Clear Creek, Utah =

Clear Creek, Utah Clear Creek Summer Camp
- Census-designated place
- Location in Carbon County and the state of Utah.

- Location of Utah in the United States
- Coordinates: 39°38′40″N 111°09′45″W
- Country: United States
- State: Utah
- County: Carbon
- Founded: 1870s

Area
  - Total: 0.20 sq mi (0.53 km^{2})
  - Land: 0.20 sq mi (0.53 km^{2})
  - Water: 0 sq mi (0.0 km^{2})
- Elevation: 8,743 ft (2,665 m)

Population (2020)
  - Total: 12
- ZIP code: 84526
- Area code: 435
- GNIS feature ID: 2584759

Clear Creek is a census-designated place on the western edge of Carbon County, Utah, United States. It is located at the south end of State Route 96 and the Pleasant Valley Branch of the Union Pacific Railroad (previously the Denver and Rio Grande Western Railroad). As of the 2020 census, Clear Creek had a population of 12.

== History ==
Clear Creek was founded in the 1870s as a logging camp that supplied lumber to the nearby mining town of Winter Quarters. About twenty years after Clear Creek was founded, coal was discovered beneath the town and a mine was developed. In 1898, the Denver and Rio Grande Western Railroad built a spur line from Scofield to the mine at Clear Creek. Two years later, the Utah Fuel Company built 25 homes, a hotel, a store, a hospital, a schoolhouse, a workshop, and a water plant in the town. From 1910 to 1920, 2,000 tons of coal was being mined per day, and Clear Creek had about 600 residents. In 1930, the need for coal began to decrease, and by 1955, the mine had cut production and the town's population had decreased to 150. According to the 2010 Census, there were four people residing in town.

The town is currently used as a recreation and camp area for various schools and programs, with cabins, a restroom and shower area, and a recreation and eating area.

=== Climate ===
Clear Creek has a warm-summer humid continental climate (Köppen Dfb), bordering on subarctic (Dfc). Summertime is generally mild to warm, with nights dropping into the 30s and 40s (°F), and wintertime is cold and snowy, with a yearly average of 237 inches (603 cm) of snow accumulation. Wintry days may be observed as late as June or as early as September due to the Town's location in the mountains of the Wasatch Plateau.

Climate data for CLEAR CREEK, UTAH
Month	Jan	Feb	Mar	Apr	May	Jun	Jul	Aug	Sep	Oct	Nov	Dec	Year
Mean daily maximum °F (°C)	31.2 (−0.4)	34.0 (1.1)	38.2 (3.4)	47.8 (8.8)	57.9 (14.4)	69.2 (20.7)	76.8 (24.9)	74.2 (23.4)	67.0 (19.4)	56.7 (13.7)	41.7 (5.4)	34.3 (1.3)	52.4 (11.3)
Mean daily minimum °F (°C)	6.5 (−14.2)	8.2 (−13.2)	12.7 (−10.7)	21.7 (−5.7)	28.4 (−2.0)	35.0 (1.7)	41.8 (5.4)	40.7 (4.8)	33.7 (0.9)	26.7 (−2.9)	16.8 (−8.4)	9.3 (−12.6)	23.5 (−4.7)
Average precipitation inches (mm)	2.69 (68)	2.30 (58)	2.41 (61)	1.82 (46)	1.42 (36)	1.29 (33)	1.48 (38)	1.99 (51)	1.57 (40)	1.52 (39)	1.65 (42)	2.89 (73)	24.05 (611)
Average snowfall inches (cm)	46.2 (117)	36.7 (93)	42.1 (107)	23.0 (58)	8.7 (22)	0.7 (1.8)	0.1 (0.25)	0 (0)	1.7 (4.3)	8.3 (21)	25.0 (64)	43.3 (110)	237.3 (603)
Source: The Western Regional Climate Center

== See also ==
- List of census-designated places in Utah
- Coal mining in the United States
