= Utah State Route 96 =

State highway in Utah, United States

State Route 96
- Eccles Canyon Scenic Byway

Route information
- Maintained by UDOT
- Length: 22.759 mi (36.627 km)
- Existed: 1935–present

Major junctions
- South end: Clear Creek
- SR-264 near Clear Creek
- North end: US 6 near Soldier Summit

Location
- Country: United States
- State: Utah

Highway system
- Utah State Highway System; Interstate; US; State; Minor; Scenic
← SR-95	→ SR-97

State Route 96 (SR-96) is a state highway in the U.S. state of Utah, connecting SR-264 and the town of Scofield to US-6 in a span of 22.76 miles (36.63 km). The route is known as the Eccles Canyon Scenic Byway, part of The Energy Loop, a National Scenic Byway.

== Route description ==
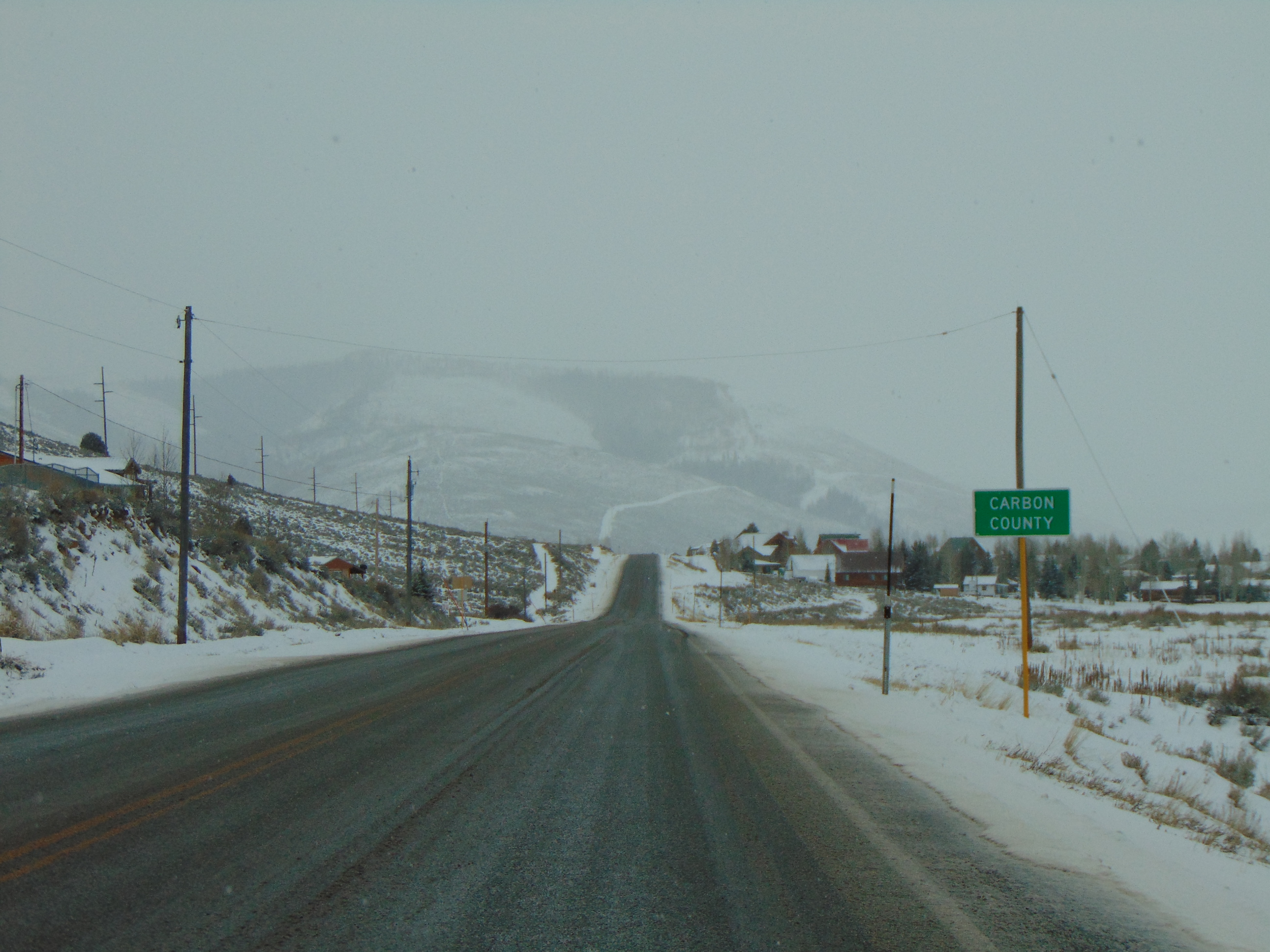
South on SR-96 at Carbon County line, December 2016

The highway begins in the town of Clear Creek, Utah and heads north as a two-lane undivided highway. The route then reaches SR-264 and turns east on the Eccles Canyon Scenic Byway as a continuation of SR-264. Past this intersection, the road turns north-northwest and soon enters Scofield. Past Scofield, the route continues northwesterly to pass the west shore of the Scofield Reservoir. On the northwestern side of the Reservoir, SR-96 passes on the Scofield Dam and then heads north, north-northwest, and due east to terminate at US-6, south of Soldier Summit and northeast of Helper.

== History ==
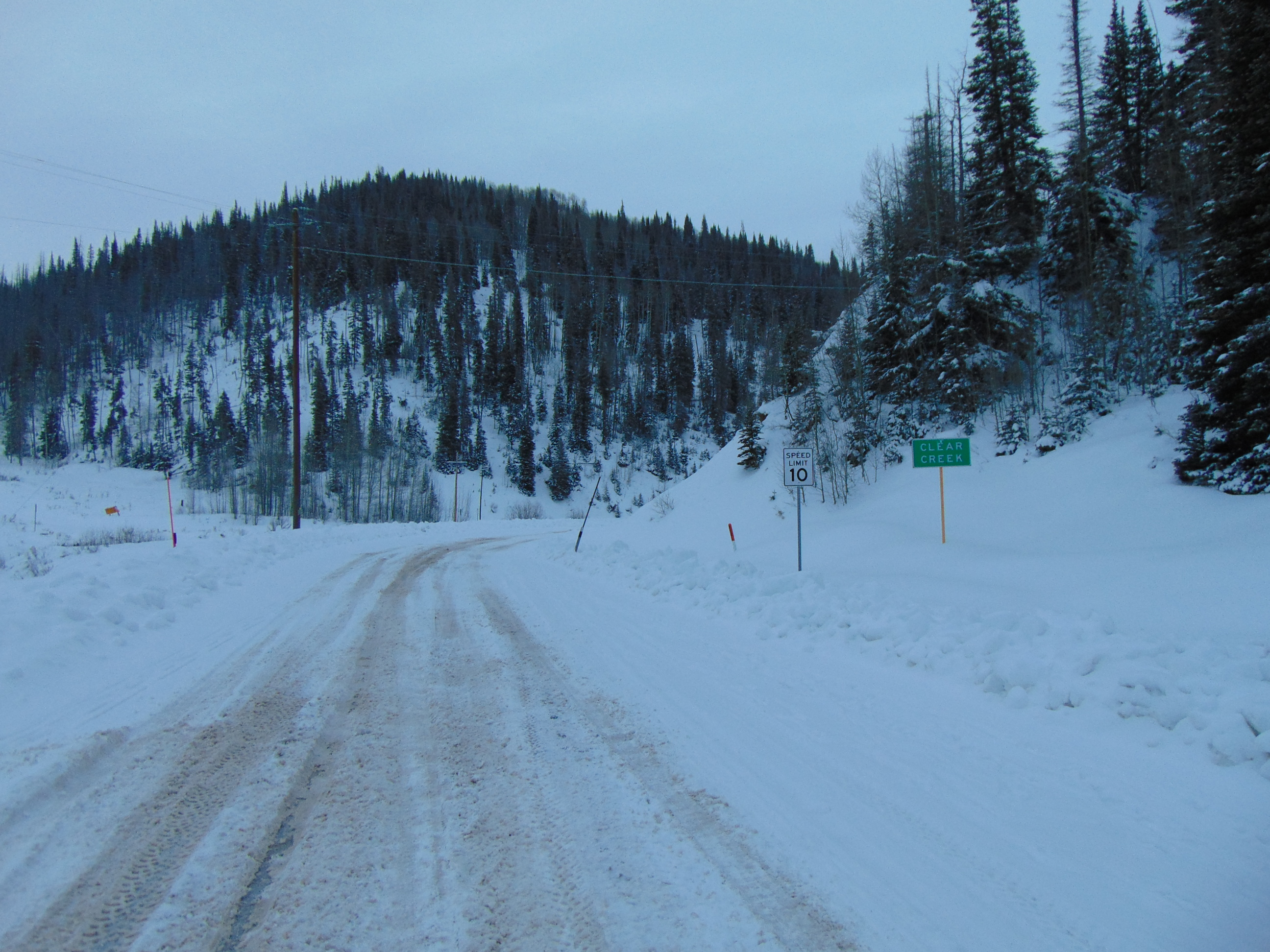
Southeast on SR-96 entering Clear Creek, December 2016

The highway was relocated during the construction of the Scofield Dam in 1943 by the W.W. Clyde Company of Springville, Utah. During 1945, SR-96 was completed crossing the old spillway and connecting it with the dam. From the south end of the dam, it connected to the old route, continuing into Scofield.

== Major intersections ==
County	Location	mi	km	Destinations	Notes
Carbon	Clear Creek	0.000	0.000	End of Maintenance sign	Southern terminus
Carbon		2.996	4.822	SR-264	
Utah		22.759	36.627	US 6 – Price, Provo	Northern terminus
1.000 mi = 1.609 km; 1.000 km = 0.621 mi

== See also ==
- List of state highways in Utah
