= Huntington, Utah =

City in Utah, United States

Huntington, Utah Area of Outstanding Natural Beauty
- City
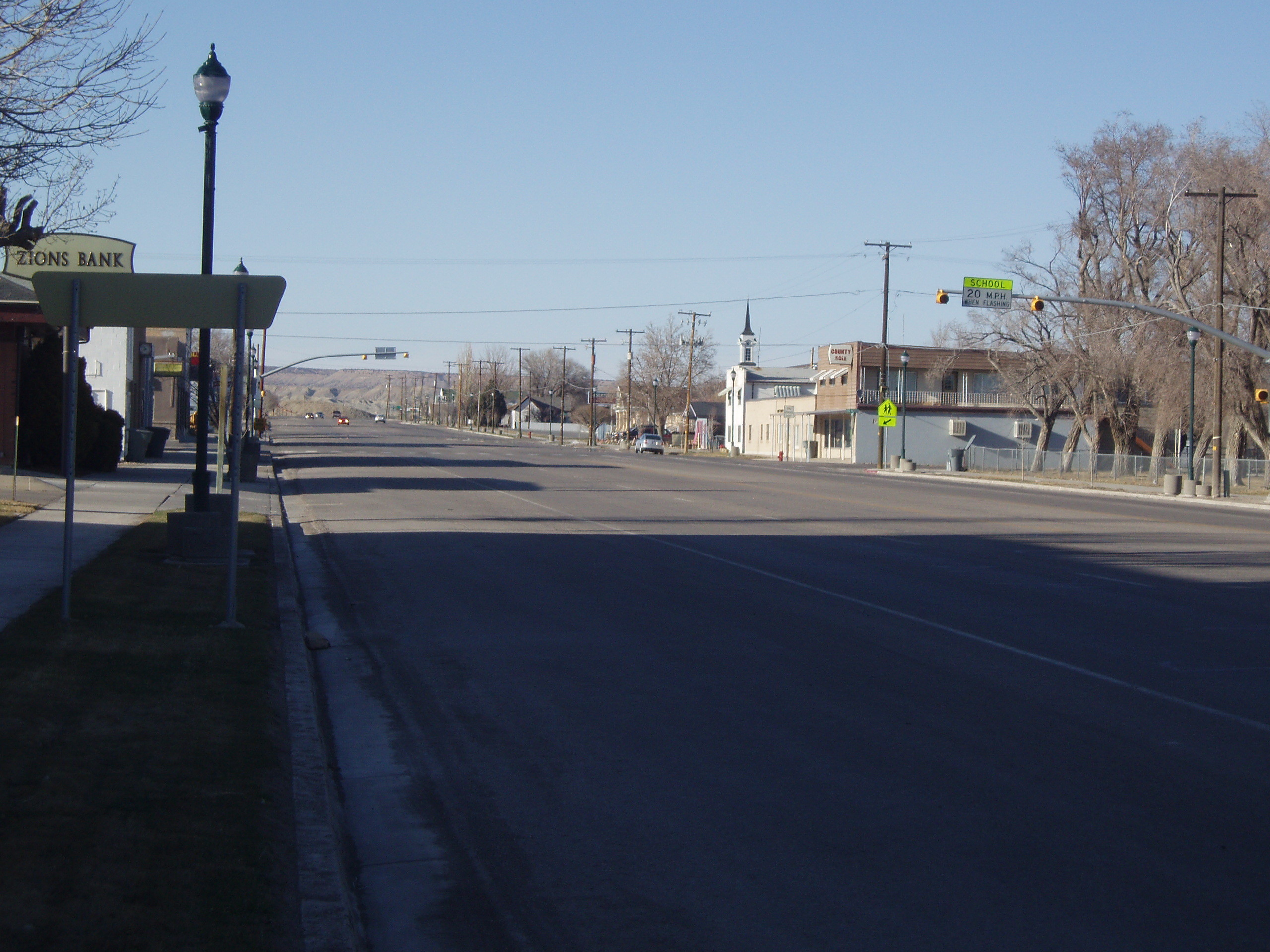
- Looking northward along Huntington's Main Street, March 2008

- Location in Emery County and the State of Utah.

- Location of Utah in the United States
- Coordinates: 39°19′45″N 110°57′57″W
- Country: United States
- State: Utah
- County: Emery
- Founded: 1875
- Named after: William Huntington

Area
  - Total: 2.26 sq mi (5.85 km^{2})
  - Land: 2.26 sq mi (5.85 km^{2})
  - Water: 0 sq mi (0.00 km^{2})
- Elevation: 5,787 ft (1,764 m)

Population (2020)
  - Total: 1,914
  - Density: 855.9/sq mi (330.46/km^{2})
- Time zone: UTC-7 (Mountain (MST))
  - Summer (DST): UTC-6 (MDT)
- ZIP code: 84528
- Area code: 435
- FIPS code: 49-36950
- GNIS feature ID: 1428946
- Website: Official website

Huntington is a city in northwestern Emery County, Utah, United States. The population was 1,914 at the 2020 census. It is the largest town in Emery County.

== History ==
Huntington is named after Huntington Creek, and the creek was probably named for Huntington brothers (William, Oliver, and Dimick, sons of William Huntington) who led exploring parties into the region during the 1850s. The first settlers of European extraction in the area were four stockmen, Leander Lemmon, James McHadden, Bill Gentry, and Alfred Starr, who brought their herds to Huntington Creek in 1875.

In the fall of 1877, in response to the same call from the Church of Jesus Christ of Latter-day Saints that brought settlers to the other creeks in Castle Valley, a small group from Fairview, Utah, under the leadership of Elias Cox, established a dugout colony on the banks of Huntington Creek and began digging irrigation canals. The colony grew from 126 in 1880 to 738 in 1890 and 1,293 in 1910. A majority of the early settlers came from the Sanpete Valley, which by the late 1870s had outgrown its irrigable land, and many belonged to three or four interrelated kinship groups, making for an abundance of cousins in the community.

In 1880 a mile-square townsite was surveyed on the Prickly Pear Flat, a bench south and west of the creek. The first structure erected on the new townsite was a 40-by-60-foot (12 by 18 m) log meetinghouse, which was completed in time for an all-night New Year's Eve party on 31 December 1880. Most of the townsite was without water until the completion of the Huntington Canal in 1882. Settlers drew town lots and built homes in town as they proved up on their homesteads. The first homes, some of which were still occupied until recent years, were typically of sawed log or plank construction or of adobe sheathed with lumber. The erection of a new LDS meetinghouse in 1896 inaugurated a twenty-year building boom that saw the completion of many brick homes, schools, and commercial buildings.

Huntington's early economic base was agriculture and stockraising. Alfalfa seed was an important cash crop around the start of the 20th century, and honey produced by local apiarist Christian Ottesen won first prize at the St. Louis World's Fair in 1903. For most of its history, however, Huntington has drawn its main income from coal mining. Small "wagon mines" in Huntington Canyon provided limited employment. The coal camp of Mohrland, 8 miles (13 km) to the north, active from about 1909 to 1938, was virtually an extension of Huntington, with many residents dividing the year between the mine and the farm. With the coming of better highways in the 1940s and 1950s, many miners commuted daily from Huntington to Hiawatha and other Carbon County mines.

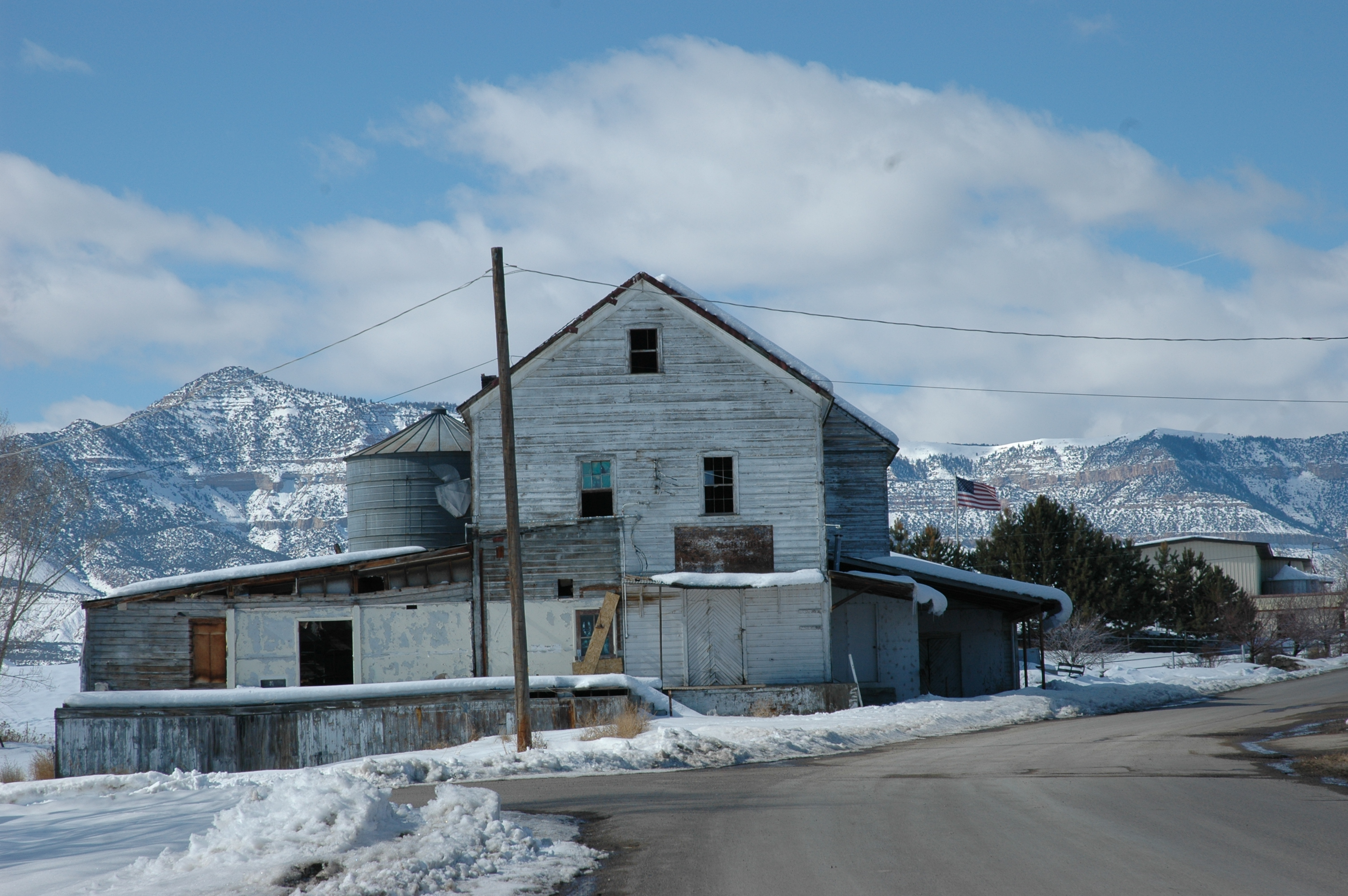
The Huntington Roller Mill, February 2010

Its proximity to the regional commercial center of Price, and distance from a major highway, 20 miles (32 km) to the north, has prevented Huntington from developing extensive retail business. However, a flour mill erected in 1892 remained in operation into the 1980s, producing feeds for local farmers and flour and cereals marketed throughout Emery and Carbon counties. Huntington High School, established in 1915 and later renamed North Emery High, was a focal point of the community until the consolidation of Emery County schools in 1962.

From its early years, Huntington has had a strong amateur arts tradition. A martial band was organized in 1884. Community theater groups produced as many as half a dozen plays a year between 1890 and 1910. A choir directed by Thomas L. Hardee and composed of singers from Huntington and neighboring Cleveland won an Eisteddfod competition hosted by the Scofield Welsh Choir in 1895, and later performed at an LDS general conference in Salt Lake City. A men's glee club organized in the early 1920s is still in existence, with third- and even fourth-generation members.

The 1950 census found 1,442 residents in the Huntington precinct. The population fell by one-third in the next ten years as mining jobs disappeared. This economic decline was reversed in 1972 when construction began on Utah Power and Light Company's Huntington steam-electric generating plant in the mouth of the canyon. The construction plus development of coal-mining operations to supply the plant gave the town the character of an energy boom town for a few years. Industrial development not only enabled some former residents to return to the community but also attracted new permanent residents, bringing more diversity to the town's former character as a Mormon farm village. While the community is still predominantly Mormon, the Mission San Rafael was established in 1977 a few miles south of Huntington to serve Catholic families in western Emery County. Baptist, Assembly of God, and nondenominational Protestant religious services have also been held in the community. The 1990 population of Huntington was 1,875.

=== Mine disaster ===
On Monday, August 6, 2007, at 2:48 a.m. (MDT), UtahAmerican Energy's Crandall Canyon Mine, 15 miles (24 km) west northwest of Huntington, collapsed trapping six workers inside. The mine, located just off State Route 31, is about 34 miles (55 km) southeast of Fairview and 140 miles (230 km) south of Salt Lake City (100 miles (160 km) on a flight line). The workers were approximately 3.4 miles (5.5 km) from the mine entrance and 1,500 feet (460 m) underground. The collapse registered recorded seismic waves in magnitude 3.9 to 4.0, by seismograph stations of the University of Utah.

As of August 16, 2007, at about 6:30 p.m. MDT, three rescue workers were killed and six injured, as the tunnel the workers were digging collapsed on top of them, covering them with coal and rubble. The six men who were not killed outright were unable to be rescued after the rescue mission was forced to halt and died as well.

On March 22, 2013, one miner died and another was injured after they became trapped in a cave-in at a part of the Castle Valley Mining Complex, about 10 miles (16 km) west of Huntington.

== Geography ==
Huntington is located in northwestern Emery County near the mouth of a long canyon that cuts diagonally into the Wasatch Plateau. According to the United States Census Bureau, Huntington has a total area of 2.0 square miles (5.3 km^{2}), all land.

=== Climate ===
This climatic region is typified by large seasonal temperature differences, with warm to hot (and often humid) summers and cold (sometimes severely cold) winters. According to the Köppen Climate Classification system, Huntington has a humid continental climate, abbreviated "Dfb" on climate maps.

== Demographics ==
Historical population
Census	Pop.	Note	%±
1890	513		—
1900	653		27.3%
1910	800		22.5%
1920	1,285		60.6%
1930	877		−31.8%
1940	997		13.7%
1950	1,029		3.2%
1960	787		−23.5%
1970	857		8.9%
1980	2,316		170.2%
1990	1,875		−19.0%
2000	2,131		13.7%
2010	2,129		−0.1%
2020	1,914		−10.1%
U.S. Decennial Census

=== 2020 census ===
As of the 2020 census, Huntington had a population of 1,914. The median age was 35.2 years. 30.1% of residents were under the age of 18 and 16.7% of residents were 65 years of age or older. For every 100 females there were 103.0 males, and for every 100 females age 18 and over there were 97.1 males age 18 and over.

0.0% of residents lived in urban areas, while 100.0% lived in rural areas.

There were 698 households in Huntington, of which 38.0% had children under the age of 18 living in them. Of all households, 58.0% were married-couple households, 16.9% were households with a male householder and no spouse or partner present, and 20.8% were households with a female householder and no spouse or partner present. About 24.5% of all households were made up of individuals and 9.7% had someone living alone who was 65 years of age or older.

There were 779 housing units, of which 10.4% were vacant. The homeowner vacancy rate was 1.7% and the rental vacancy rate was 13.9%.

Racial composition as of the 2020 census
Race	Number	Percent
White	1,714	89.6%
Black or African American	2	0.1%
American Indian and Alaska Native	10	0.5%
Asian	13	0.7%
Native Hawaiian and Other Pacific Islander	6	0.3%
Some other race	53	2.8%
Two or more races	116	6.1%
Hispanic or Latino (of any race)	176	9.2%

=== 2000 census ===
As of the 2000 census, there were 2,131 people, 690 households, and 547 families residing in the town. The population density was 1,047.6 people per square mile (404.5 people/km^{2}). There were 778 housing units at an average density of 382.5 per square mile (147.7/km^{2}). The racial makeup of the town was 92.40% White, 0.19% African American, 0.47% Native American, 0.19% Asian, 0.05% Pacific Islander, 5.02% from other races, and 1.69% from two or more races. Hispanic or Latino of any race were 12.39% of the population.

There were 690 households, out of which 46.5% had children under the age of 18 living with them, 65.1% were married couples living together, 9.9% had a female householder with no husband present, and 20.7% were non-families. 19.0% of all households were made up of individuals, and 9.6% had someone living alone who was 65 years of age or older. The average household size was 3.09 and the average family size was 3.55.

In Huntington, the population was spread out, with 36.2% under the age of 18, 11.8% from 18 to 24, 25.7% from 25 to 44, 16.8% from 45 to 64, and 9.5% who were 65 years of age or older. The median age was 26 years. For every 100 females, there were 101.0 males. For every 100 females age 18 and over, there were 98.7 males.

The median income for a household in Huntington was $36,964, and the median income for a family was $42,083. Males had a median income of $36,588 versus $19,125 for females. The per capita income for the city was $14,606. About 11.4% of families and 13.8% of the population were below the poverty line, including 16.4% of those under age 18 and 9.5% of those age 65 or over.

== Transportation ==
The town is bisected by Huntington Creek. Utah State Route 10 passes through the center of town as Main Street, leading northeast 21 miles (34 km) to Price and southwest 9 miles (14 km) to Castle Dale, the Emery County seat. State Route 31 leads northwest from Huntington across the Wasatch Plateau 48 miles (77 km) to Fairview.

The Huntington Municipal Airport is a public-use airport located three nautical miles (6 km) northeast of Huntington's central business district.

== Education ==
Emery County School District operates public schools in the county.

== See also ==
- List of cities and towns in Utah
