= Huntington Municipal Airport (Utah) =

Airport in Utah, US

- IATA: none; ICAO: none; FAA LID: 69V

Summary
- Airport type: Public
- Owner: Emery County
- Serves: Huntington, Utah
- Elevation AMSL: 5,915 ft (1,803 m)
- Coordinates: 39°21′40″N 110°55′01″W
- Interactive map of Huntington Municipal Airport

Runways
Direction	Length		Surface
Direction	ft	m	Surface
8/26	4,048	1,234	Asphalt
12/30	3,640	1,109	Dirt
18/36	2,079	634	Dirt

Statistics (2023)
- Aircraft operations (year ending 9/29/2023): 1,860
- Source: Federal Aviation Administration

Huntington Municipal Airport (FAA LID: 69V) is a county-owned, public-use airport located three nautical miles (3.5 mi, 5.6 km) northeast of the central business district of Huntington, a town in Emery County, Utah, United States.

== Facilities and aircraft ==
Huntington Municipal Airport covers an area of 333 acres (135 ha) at an elevation of 5,915 feet (1,803 m) above mean sea level. It has three runways: 8/26 (formerly 7/25) is 4,048 by 75 feet (1,234 x 23 m) with an asphalt surface; 12/30 is 3,640 by 70 feet (1,109 x 21 m) with a dirt surface; 18/36 is 2,079 by 56 feet (634 x 17 m) with a dirt surface.

For the 12-month period ending September 29, 2023, the airport had 1,860 aircraft operations, an average of 36 per week: 100% general aviation, and <1% air taxi.

== Character ==
This airport serves as a backcountry airport gateway; it offers camping and showers for flyers who start or end their backcountry trips there. The airport has also been used considerably for emergency and state law enforcement flights.

== See also ==
- List of airports in Utah
