= Scofield Reservoir =

Reservoir in the state of Utah, United States

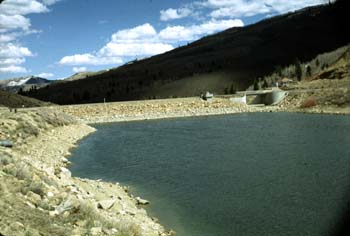
- Scofield Reservoir and dam

- Location within Utah Location within the United States
- Location: Carbon County, Utah, United States
- Coordinates: 39°47′13″N 111°07′12″W
- Type: reservoir
- Primary inflows: Price River
- Primary outflows: Price River
- Catchment area: 4,350,000 acres (17,600 km^{2})
- Basin countries: United States
- Max. length: 4.9 m (16 ft)
- Max. width: 2.1 m (6 ft 11 in)
- Surface area: 2,815 acres (11.39 km^{2})
- Average depth: 26 ft (7.9 m)
- Max. depth: 66 ft (20.1 m)
- Water volume: 73,600 acre⋅ft (90,800,000 m^{3})
- Shore length^{1}: 15.5 mi (24.9 km)
- Surface elevation: 7,618 ft (2,322 m)
- Islands: 1
- Settlements: Scofield, Utah
- Website: Official website
- ^{1} Shore length is not a well-defined measure.

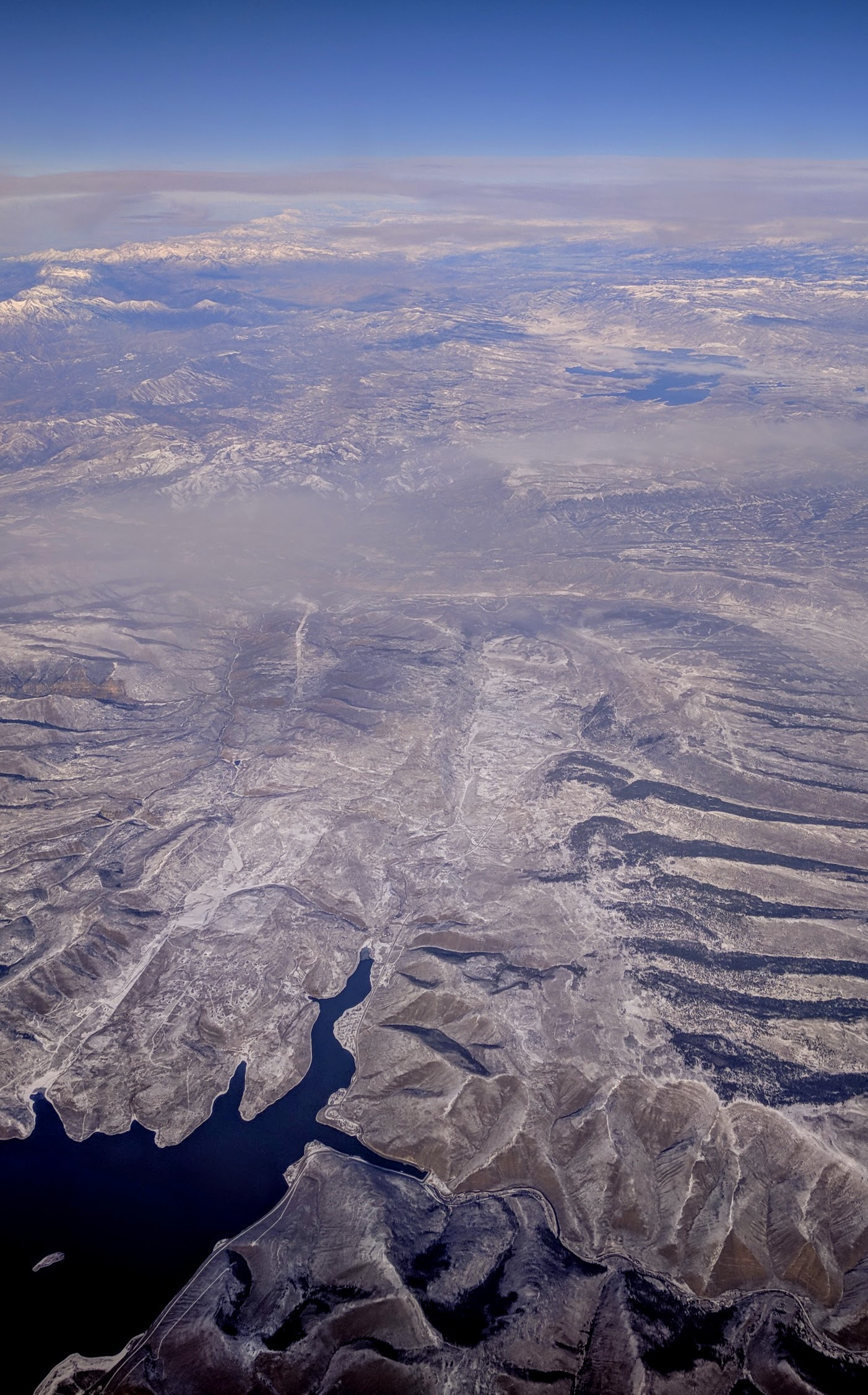
Scofield Reservoir (lower left) aerial view from the south. The dam is at the rightmost point of the water.

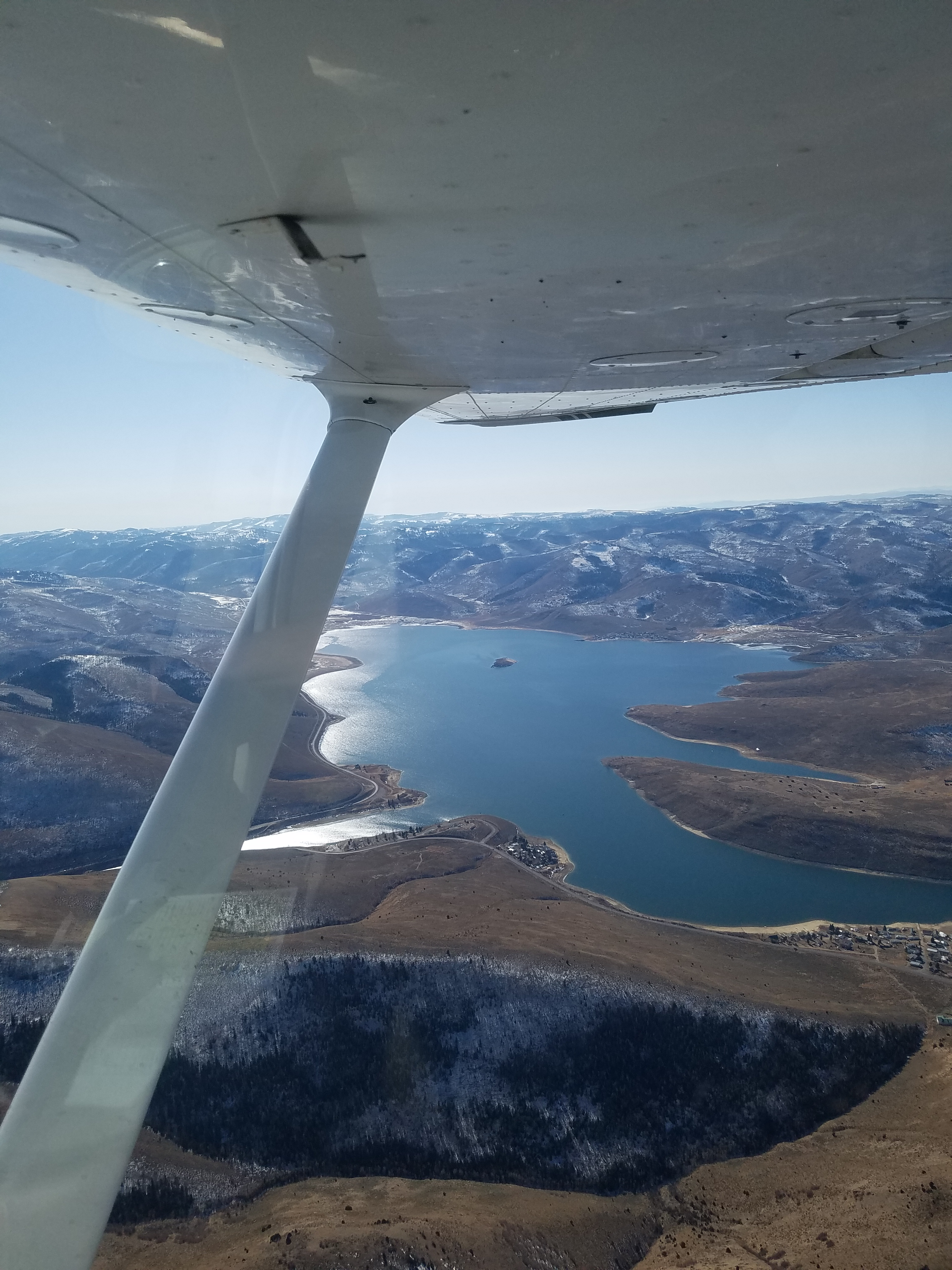
Aerial view of Scofield Reservoir from the north

Scofield Reservoir is a 2,815-acre (11.39 km^{2}) reservoir impounded by Scofield Dam, in Carbon County, Utah. Located on the Price River, a tributary of the Green River, Scofield Reservoir is adjacent to the northernmost boundary of the Manti–La Sal National Forest. The reservoir sits at an elevation of 7,618 feet (2,322 m), on the northern edge of the Wasatch Plateau. Utah State Route 96 runs along the eastern shoreline.

After initial attempts to complete a permanent dam on the Price River, the Scofield project was initiated by the US Bureau of Reclamation. The Scofield project eventually irrigated area lands originally to be served by Mammoth Dam, and later by the defunct Gooseberry project. The present-day dam was completed in 1946. Besides providing flood protection due to variable stream flow, the reservoir is an important source of water for municipal and industrial sources. It is also a popular fishing and outdoor recreation spot for nearby communities.

== Hydrology ==
The reservoir is on the Price River. The reservoir is also fed by groundwater and many small intermittent mountain streams during spring runoff. Principal among these are Fish Creek and Clear Creek Canyon Annual inflow is 52,000 acre⋅ft (64,000,000 m^{3}).

== History ==
Irrigation development of lands served by the Scofield project began in 1883. Ditch companies were organized, and the water was diverted from the natural flow of the Price River. From time to time, canal systems were combined and extended until it was found that the natural flow of the river was inadequate to supply irrigation demands fully.

The Mammoth Reservoir Company was incorporated and made filings on the floodwaters of the Price River in 1896. In 1900, a group of farmers from Sanpete County secured the company's rights to store water and convey it by transmountain diversion to their lands.

In 1902, the Sanpete group had financial difficulties, and the project passed into the hands of the Irrigated Lands Co. The latter company abandoned the idea of watering Sanpete County lands and made plans to irrigate 25,000 acres (100 km^{2}) near Price, Utah. The company, in cooperation with the State of Utah, proceeded with the construction of Mammoth Dam. After going through considerable financial difficulty, the Irrigated Lands Co. was reorganized in 1911 to form the Price River Irrigation Co., which developed the project as rapidly as financial conditions and demand for water would permit. The dam failed on June 25, 1917, when it was only partly completed, releasing 11,000 acre⋅ft (14,000,000 m^{3}) of water and causing flood damage estimated at $1 million to railroad and mining property.

The Price River Water Conservation District, a municipal corporation, was organized in 1921 to develop storage facilities in the Price River watershed to replace the destroyed Mammoth Dam. Under the district's direction, Scofield Dam 39°47′12″N 111°07′13″W was constructed during 1925–1926. The reservoir formed behind the dam had a capacity of 6,000 acre⋅ft (7,400,000 m^{3}). In May 1928, with the reservoir practically filled for the first time, the dam partially failed.

Emergency repairs, together with the rapid evacuation of storage water through the outlet tunnel, were effective in preventing complete failure and a devastating flood. Numerous attempts at placing the dam in a safe operating condition were unsuccessful. In view of the apparent weakness of the dam, storage in Scofield Reservoir was strictly limited to a maximum of 30,000 acre⋅ft (37,000,000 m^{3}).

The replacement of the original dam was expedited during World War II because a potential failure of the existing dam posed a threat to the war effort. The Bureau of Reclamation investigated the development of the Scofield project in accordance with a cooperative contract between the United States and the State of Utah. The study resulted in the adoption of the plan to replace the unsafe Scofield Dam with a completely new and larger structure to be erected about 800 feet (240 m) downstream from the existing dam.

The project was authorized by the president on June 24, 1943, under the terms of the Water Conservation and Utilization Act of August 11, 1939 (53 Stat. 1418), as amended.

Under the Utah Water Conservancy Act of 1941, the Carbon Water Conservancy District was organized in 1943 for the purpose of negotiating a contract with the United States for the construction of the new dam. Contract negotiations between this district, the Price River Water Conservation District, and the United States were completed in 1943.

Construction of the new storage works by the W.W. Clyde Company of Springville, Utah, was undertaken during World War II to prevent possible flood damage to the main line of the Denver and Rio Grande Western Railroad, the State highway, the telephone and telegraph lines, and the coal mines, all of which were important to the war effort. The new dam was completed June 15, 1946.

== Current dam ==
Scofield Dam is a zoned earthfill structure with a structural height of 125 feet (38 m). The dam's crest length is 575 feet (175 m) with a top width of thirty feet. It contains 204,000 cubic yards of material. The maximum base width is 400 feet (120 m). Total capacity of Scofield Reservoir is 73,600 acre⋅ft (90,800,000 m^{3}) with an active capacity of 65,800 acre⋅ft (81,200,000 m^{3}). The spillway is an uncontrolled concrete crest and concrete-lined chute at the right abutment.

== Uses ==
Uses of Scofield Reservoir and its watershed include coal mining, agriculture, residential, fishing, hunting, snowmobiling, camping, and a variety of other types of summer and winter recreations.

Initially, the Federal government viewed the dam as a flood control measure to prevent damage to vital defense industries and transportation. For the local population, Scofield Dam and Reservoir also supplied irrigation water for surrounding farms. In 1943, local farms grew alfalfa, barley, beans, corn, oats, wheat, potatoes, sugar beets, and pasture. Orchard crops around Helper included peaches, pears, apricots, and apples.

Crop values on the Scofield project reached over one million dollars in the 1960s and early 1970s. From 1973 to 1974, crop values jumped from $1,552,089 to $3,672,419. The drought of 1977 caused the value to plunge to $1,515,005. Gross crop value reached four million dollars in 1981.

While still providing flood protection and sustainable water supply, the reservoir now serves as a popular recreation area. It is part of Scofield State Park, part of the Utah State Parks system.

Scofield has traditionally been one of Utah's top fisheries. Besides producing desirable sizes and quantities of trout, it is unique in that it is an outstanding shore fishery. The reservoir is home to rainbow trout, cutthroat trout, redside shiner, mountain sucker. Common invertebrate species include damselfly, mayfly, and crayfish. It is also popular during the winter as an ice fishery. In recent years the fishery and its management have been impacted due to water quality impairments.

The reservoir is also home to the Scofield triathlon, held annually since 2006.

== Climate ==
Climate data for Scofield Dam, Utah, 1991–2020 normals, 1971-1990 precip/snowfall: 7630ft (2326m)
Month	Jan	Feb	Mar	Apr	May	Jun	Jul	Aug	Sep	Oct	Nov	Dec	Year
Record high °F (°C)	54 (12)	57 (14)	64 (18)	71 (22)	78 (26)	89 (32)	92 (33)	89 (32)	86 (30)	78 (26)	64 (18)	51 (11)	92 (33)
Mean maximum °F (°C)	42.6 (5.9)	48.4 (9.1)	53.4 (11.9)	65.4 (18.6)	73.0 (22.8)	81.4 (27.4)	86.4 (30.2)	85.1 (29.5)	80.9 (27.2)	67.0 (19.4)	57.8 (14.3)	46.0 (7.8)	78.8 (26.0)
Mean daily maximum °F (°C)	30.3 (−0.9)	33.8 (1.0)	42.0 (5.6)	49.2 (9.6)	60.7 (15.9)	72.2 (22.3)	78.4 (25.8)	78.2 (25.7)	68.0 (20.0)	55.2 (12.9)	41.9 (5.5)	30.7 (−0.7)	53.4 (11.9)
Daily mean °F (°C)	16.9 (−8.4)	19.8 (−6.8)	28.6 (−1.9)	37.2 (2.9)	46.2 (7.9)	55.6 (13.1)	61.6 (16.4)	61.4 (16.3)	52.6 (11.4)	42.0 (5.6)	29.9 (−1.2)	18.6 (−7.4)	39.2 (4.0)
Mean daily minimum °F (°C)	3.6 (−15.8)	5.7 (−14.6)	15.1 (−9.4)	25.1 (−3.8)	31.7 (−0.2)	39.0 (3.9)	44.7 (7.1)	44.6 (7.0)	37.2 (2.9)	28.7 (−1.8)	17.9 (−7.8)	6.4 (−14.2)	25.0 (−3.9)
Mean minimum °F (°C)	−14.6 (−25.9)	−13.4 (−25.2)	−1.9 (−18.8)	10.9 (−11.7)	20.1 (−6.6)	32.5 (0.3)	34.4 (1.3)	37.0 (2.8)	26.0 (−3.3)	12.6 (−10.8)	2.0 (−16.7)	−14.6 (−25.9)	−15.8 (−26.6)
Record low °F (°C)	−45 (−43)	−43 (−42)	−26 (−32)	−10 (−23)	9 (−13)	20 (−7)	29 (−2)	24 (−4)	8 (−13)	0 (−18)	−22 (−30)	−39 (−39)	−45 (−43)
Average precipitation inches (mm)	0.96 (24)	0.96 (24)	1.04 (26)	0.83 (21)	1.04 (26)	0.72 (18)	1.15 (29)	1.39 (35)	1.28 (33)	1.31 (33)	1.04 (26)	0.85 (22)	12.57 (317)
Average snowfall inches (cm)	21.9 (56)	21.3 (54)	19.4 (49)	8.0 (20)	2.2 (5.6)	0.1 (0.25)	0.0 (0.0)	0.0 (0.0)	0.2 (0.51)	3.5 (8.9)	17.0 (43)	18.3 (46)	111.9 (283.26)
Source 1: NOAA
Source 2: XMACIS2 (precipitation, snow & records)

== Communities ==
To the direct south of the reservoir is the town of Scofield, Utah. Approximately 45 miles (72 km) northwest, lies the Provo–Orem metropolitan area.

== See also ==
- Aspen Cove at Scofield
- Scofield Scout Camp at Frandsen Scout Ranch
