= Utah State Route 231 =

State highway in Fairview, Utah, United States

State Route 231
- State Street

Route information
- Maintained by UDOT
- Length: 0.085 mi (137 m)
- Existed: 2018–present

Major junctions
- South end: US 89 in Fairview
- North end: SR-31 in Fairview

Location
- Country: United States
- State: Utah
- Counties: Sanpete

Highway system
- Utah State Highway System; Interstate; US; State; Minor; Scenic
← SR-228	→ SR-232

State Route 231 (SR-231) is the shortest state highway in the U.S. state of Utah. It serves as a connection between U.S. Route 89 (US-89) and SR-31 in Fairview.

== Route description ==
SR-231 begins at the intersection of State Street (US-89) and Milburn Road, proceeding north on the latter. After slightly less than a city block, the route comes to its northern terminus at Canyon Road (SR-31). The road continues to the north towards Milburn, but it is not state-maintained beyond the SR-31 junction. The entire length of SR-231 is 0.085 miles (450 ft; 137 m).

== History ==
The road from Fairview north to Milburn was added to the state route system in 1912 as part of SR-32, and in 1926 it became part of the original alignment of US-89. US-89 was moved to bypass Milburn in 1937, and the old route between Fairview and Milburn was transferred to SR-91. The routes remained in this configuration until 1969, when SR-91 was removed from the state highway system in a mass deletion of minor state highways and transferred to local jurisdiction.

However, the short segment of former SR-91 between US-89 and SR-31 in Fairview continued to be used as the primary connection from northbound US-89 to eastbound SR-31, and vice versa. As a result, in the meeting of the Utah Transportation Commission on October 12, 2018, this one-block segment was re-added to the state highway system as SR-231.

== Major intersections ==
The entire route is in Fairview, Sanpete County.

mi	km	Destinations	Notes
0.000	0.000	US 89 (State Street)	Southern terminus
0.085	0.137	SR-31 (Canyon Road)	Northern terminus
1.000 mi = 1.609 km; 1.000 km = 0.621 mi
