= WW Clyde =

- Industry: Construction
- Founded: 1926; 99 years ago in Springville, Utah
- Founder: Wilford W. Clyde
- Headquarters: Orem, Utah, United States
- Number of employees: 550 (2022)
- Parent: Clyde Companies, Inc
- Website: wwclyde.net

WW Clyde is a heavy civil construction firm based in Orem, Utah, United States (but formerly in nearby Springville).

WW Clyde is a subsidiary of Clyde Companies, Inc, which also owns Geneva Rock, Sunroc, Sunpro, GWC Capital, Bridgesource, and Beehive Insurance.

== Description ==
WW Clyde was founded in 1926 by Wilford W. Clyde, brother to George Dewey Clyde, who later became a Governor of Utah. The company began as a business focused on building roads, and now specializes in a variety of construction services, including building bridges and other structures, highways, pipelines, mining and mine reclamation, site development, and aggregate processing. WW Clyde operates throughout the western United States. On December 28, 2020, WW Clyde announced the acquisition of Phoenix-based Blount Contracting, Inc.

In 2022, WW Clyde won the national Associated General Contractors Safety Excellence Awards in the category of under 800,000 work hours. WW Clyde won in the Highway and Transportation Division for its efforts navigating the 2021 calendar year without any recordable incidents.

== Projects ==
In the past, WW Clyde has completed many major projects:

- 1940s: Salt Lake City International Airport expansion; St. George Municipal Airport; replacement of Scofield Dam
- 1950s: Salt Lake City’s State Street
- 1960s: Arthur V. Watkins Dam; Starvation Bridge
- 1970s: Utah Power and Light plant and substation; LDS Church Office Building
- 1980s: Green River Bridge; Interstate 215 belt route
- 1990s: Barney’s Canyon Pipeline; South Towne Center
- 2000s: 2002 Winter Olympics projects; Point of the Mountain Aqueduct Pipeline
- 2010s: Pioneer Crossing; Pioneer Wind Farm
- 2020s: Utah State Route 154
