= Colton, Utah =

Colton
- Ghost town
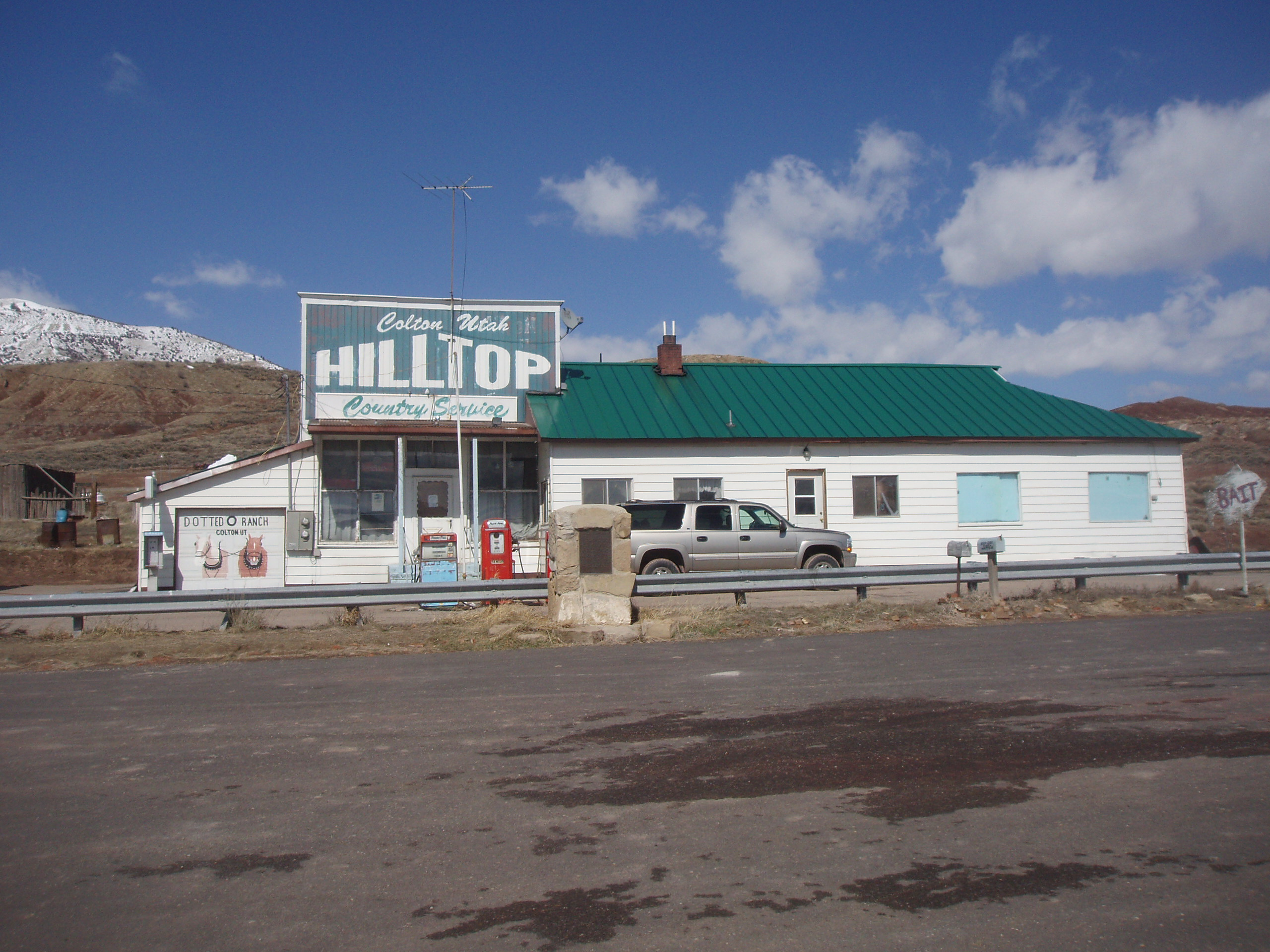
- Hilltop Country Store, one of the last remnants of Colton, April 2009

- Location within Utah Location within the United States
- Coordinates: 39°51′09″N 111°00′47″W
- Country: United States
- State: Utah
- County: Utah
- Established: 1883
- Abandoned: 1950s
- Named for: William F. Colton
- Elevation: 7,238 ft (2,206 m)
- GNIS feature ID: 1437529

Colton is a ghost town located near the southeastern edge of Utah County, Utah, United States, approximately 6 miles (9.7 km) south of Soldier Summit. Formerly a busy railroad junction on the Denver and Rio Grande Western Railroad, Colton is a landmark on U.S. Route 6 between the cities of Spanish Fork and Price.

Historical population
Census	Pop.	Note	%±
1890	427		—
1900	107		−74.9%
1910	194		81.3%
1920	49		−74.7%
1930	53		8.2%
1940	26		−50.9%
1950	50		92.3%

== History ==
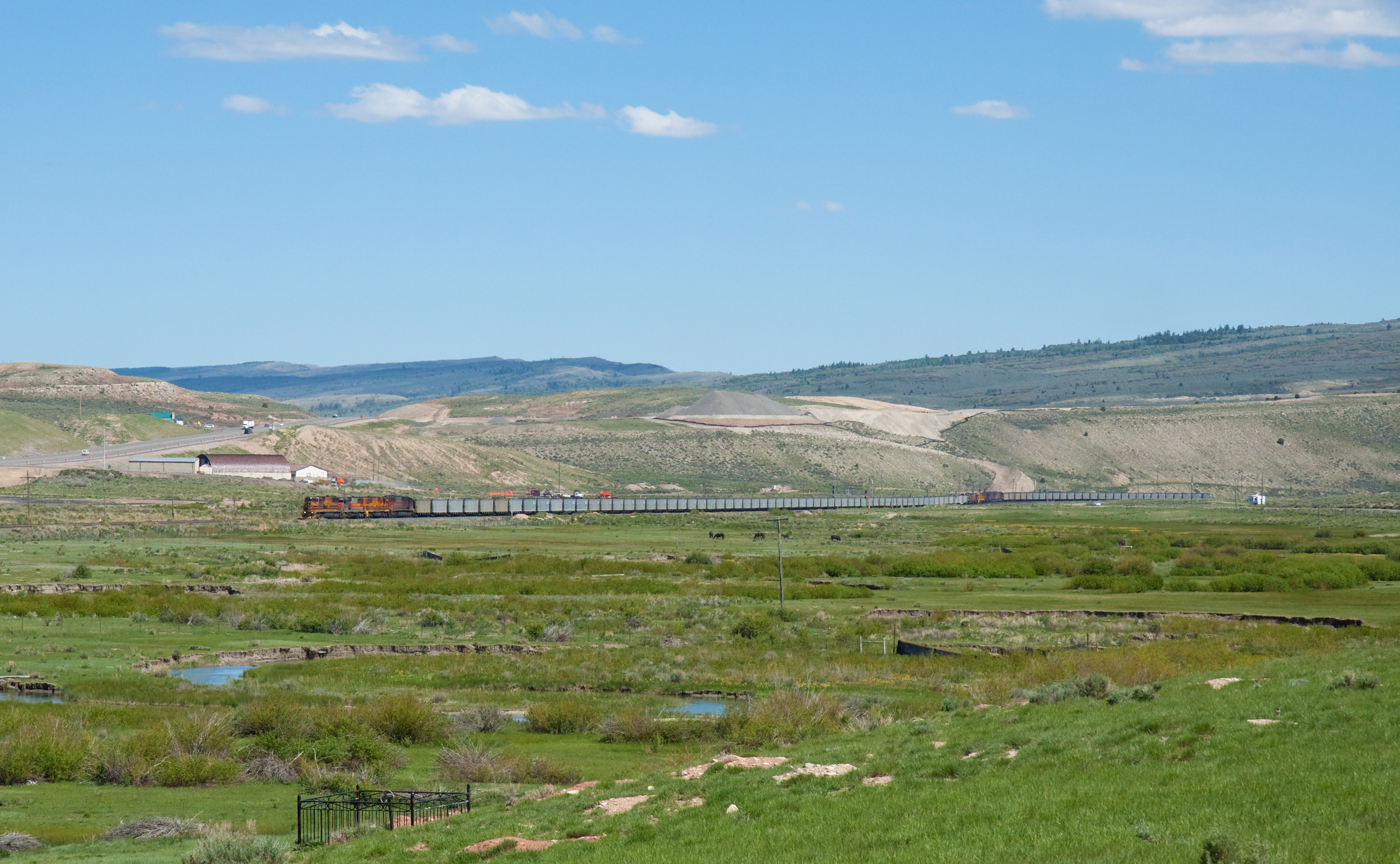
Utah Railway train passing Colton, June 2010

The site was first settled in 1883 under the name of Pleasant Valley Junction, where the Pleasant Valley Railroad connected the mining town of Winter Quarters, 20 miles (32 km) to the south, to the Rio Grande line. This line was soon abandoned, replaced by a Rio Grande branch along a much easier grade between Pleasant Valley Junction and Scofield. Pleasant Valley Junction quickly grew to include a store, hotel, and five saloons. In addition to the railroad, the mining and milling of ozokerite was important in the local economy. Sometime just before 1898 the town was renamed Colton in honor of railroad official William F. Colton. Two years later in 1900 the Scofield mine disaster dealt the entire area a serious blow, but Colton survived.

In 1915 Colton nearly experienced a second boom when the railroad considered forming a division point here, but they eventually chose Soldier Summit instead. Colton stayed a fairly busy railroad town—in fact, the town burned and was rebuilt three times. When the introduction of diesel locomotives began to eliminate the need for helper engines to push trains over the Summit, Colton rapidly declined. By the 1950s most of the railroad operations were stopped and the buildings removed.

The most noticeable remnant of Colton is the Hilltop Country Store, which was moved up to the highway in 1937, but is no longer in business. A few intact buildings and ruins are still found in the townsite itself.

== See also ==
- List of ghost towns in Utah
