= Electric Lake =

Reservoir in the state of Utah, United States

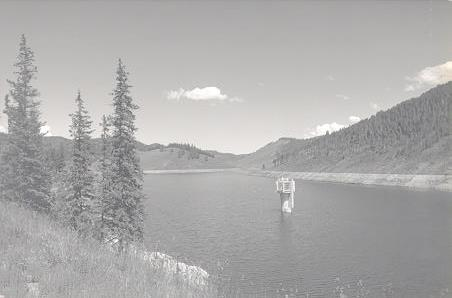

- Location in Utah
- Location: East slope of the Wasatch Plateau, Utah
- Coordinates: 39°36′18.33″N 111°13′13.49″W
- Type: Reservoir
- Primary inflows: Huntington Creek
- Basin countries: United States
- Managing agency: Primarily owned by Utah Power and Light and the Huntington-Cleveland Irrigation Company
- Surface elevation: 8,579 ft (2,615 m)

Electric Lake is a large reservoir on Huntington Creek high on the east slope of the Wasatch Plateau in Utah. The reservoir was created in 1974 by the construction of an earth-fill dam. The shoreline is primarily owned by Utah Power and Light (UP&L) and the Huntington-Cleveland Irrigation Company. Access is limited but the northern end of the reservoir is adjacent to the national forest and access is unrestricted at that point.

== Uses ==
Water is consumed for irrigation and power plant cooling, but also used for recreation and coldwater aquatic habitat. Enough water is stored to provide cooling water for a four-year drought, so water levels remain deep throughout most summers. This greatly enhances recreational use. Electric Lake is accessible from U-31 and U-264. U-31 follows the south shore for about 0.5 miles near the dam (21 miles east of Fairview City and 27 miles northwest of Huntington), but there is no boat ramp at this access. U-264 follows the north shore for 1/2 mile (6 miles east of junction U-31 and 9 miles west of junction U-96). There are latrines and a concrete boat ramp at this site. Both highways are maintained year-round, making the area popular for winter recreation.

== Climate ==
Electric Lake has a subalpine climate (Köppen Dfc).

Climate data for Electric Lake, Utah, 1991–2020 normals, 1980-2020 extremes: 8380ft (2554m)
Month	Jan	Feb	Mar	Apr	May	Jun	Jul	Aug	Sep	Oct	Nov	Dec	Year
Record high °F (°C)	49 (9)	53 (12)	61 (16)	71 (22)	78 (26)	83 (28)	89 (32)	88 (31)	81 (27)	75 (24)	60 (16)	49 (9)	89 (32)
Mean maximum °F (°C)	40 (4)	45 (7)	51 (11)	59 (15)	70 (21)	76 (24)	81 (27)	79 (26)	74 (23)	64 (18)	50 (10)	38 (3)	81 (27)
Mean daily maximum °F (°C)	26.7 (−2.9)	30.5 (−0.8)	37.7 (3.2)	42.8 (6.0)	54.6 (12.6)	66.3 (19.1)	74.2 (23.4)	71.7 (22.1)	62.5 (16.9)	48.0 (8.9)	34.8 (1.6)	25.2 (−3.8)	47.9 (8.9)
Daily mean °F (°C)	15.1 (−9.4)	16.7 (−8.5)	23.7 (−4.6)	30.5 (−0.8)	41.0 (5.0)	50.8 (10.4)	57.4 (14.1)	55.7 (13.2)	47.2 (8.4)	35.1 (1.7)	24.7 (−4.1)	13.7 (−10.2)	34.3 (1.3)
Mean daily minimum °F (°C)	3.6 (−15.8)	2.8 (−16.2)	9.8 (−12.3)	18.2 (−7.7)	27.4 (−2.6)	35.3 (1.8)	40.6 (4.8)	39.8 (4.3)	32.0 (0.0)	22.3 (−5.4)	14.6 (−9.7)	2.2 (−16.6)	20.7 (−6.3)
Mean minimum °F (°C)	−19 (−28)	−21 (−29)	−12 (−24)	0 (−18)	16 (−9)	26 (−3)	34 (1)	33 (1)	22 (−6)	13 (−11)	−4 (−20)	−18 (−28)	−22 (−30)
Record low °F (°C)	−31 (−35)	−48 (−44)	−29 (−34)	−16 (−27)	1 (−17)	18 (−8)	29 (−2)	23 (−5)	14 (−10)	3 (−16)	−22 (−30)	−34 (−37)	−48 (−44)
Average precipitation inches (mm)	2.82 (72)	2.52 (64)	2.33 (59)	2.81 (71)	2.03 (52)	0.97 (25)	0.97 (25)	1.57 (40)	1.73 (44)	1.94 (49)	2.08 (53)	2.74 (70)	24.51 (624)
Source 1: NOAA
Source 2: XMACIS2 (records & monthly max/mins)
