= Huntington Creek (Utah) =

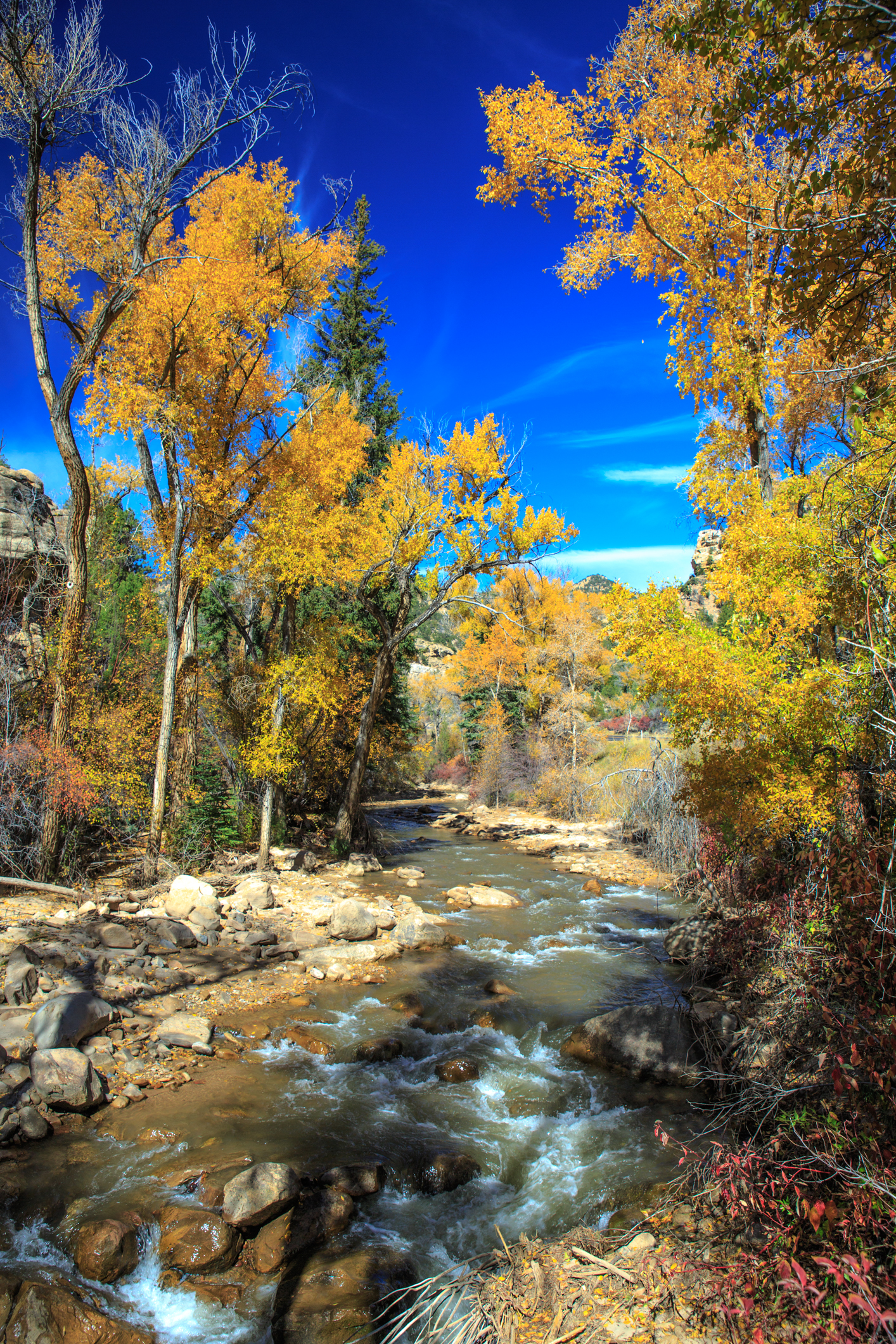
- Fall colors along Huntington Creek, October 2014

Location
- Country: United States
- State: Utah
- County: Emery County

Physical characteristics
- Source
  - location: Emery County
  - coordinates: 39.642741°N 111.2357298°W
- Mouth
  - location: Castle Valley (Carbon, Emery, and Sevier counties, Utah)
  - coordinates: 39.1491394°N 110.9129440°W
  - elevation: 5,344 feet (1,629 m)

Basin features
- Progression: San Rafael River

Huntington Creek is a tributary of the San Rafael River in northwestern Emery County, Utah, United States. It rises in the Electric Lake on the Wasatch Plateau in the Manti-La Sal National Forest, and flows down to the floor of Castle Valley in Emery County. Electric Lake, created in 1974, regulates its flow to supply water to the Huntington Power Plant at the bottom of the canyon. The creek is an important fishery.

== See also ==
- List of rivers of Utah
