= Scofield, Utah =

Town in the state of Utah, United States

- Town
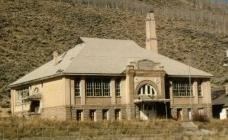
- Historic Scofield Utah School building

- Location in Carbon County and the state of Utah

- Location of Utah in the United States
- Coordinates: 39°43′11″N 111°09′44″W
- Country: United States
- State: Utah
- County: Carbon
- Founded: 1879
- Named for: Mathew B. Scofield

Area
  - Total: 0.92 sq mi (2.39 km^{2})
  - Land: 0.92 sq mi (2.39 km^{2})
  - Water: 0 sq mi (0.00 km^{2})
- Elevation: 7,733 ft (2,357 m)

Population (2020)
  - Total: 26
  - Density: 25.0/sq mi (9.64/km^{2})
- Time zone: UTC-7 (Mountain (MST))
  - Summer (DST): UTC-6 (MDT)
- ZIP code: 84526
- Area code: 435
- FIPS code: 49-67990
- GNIS feature ID: 2413267
- Website: www.scofieldtown.org

Scofield is a town in Carbon County, Utah, United States. The population was 26 at the 2020 census. Scofield's name is frequently applied to the 1900 mine disaster in the Pleasant Valley Coal Company's Winter Quarters mine. The community was named for General Charles W. Scofield, a timber contractor and local mine official. It is the smallest incorporated area in Utah by population.

== History ==
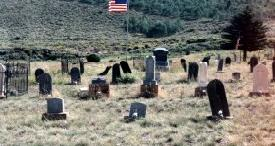
Scofield Cemetery and some of its wooden grave markers

The town of Scofield is situated on high ground two miles south of the reservoir of the same name, the oldest and largest of the major impoundments on the Wasatch Plateau. Once the most populous community in Carbon County, Scofield has shrunk to only a few permanent residents. What has slowed the continual decline has become outsiders constructing summer vacation homes. The old brick school stands empty at the upper end of town, and there are abandoned buildings scattered through what was once the business district. Only the cemetery on a hill to the east suggests that this was once a community of some size.

=== Settlement ===
Due to the luxuriant growth of the native grasses indigenous to this region, this valley was first utilized as pastures for the immense herds of cattle and sheep that came from Utah Valley. Among the first settlers of this region were S. J. Harkness, T. H. Thomas, William Burrows, O. G. Kimball, D. D. Green, A. H. Earll, R. McKecheney, who were attracted by the immense ranges for their cattle.

=== Discovery of coal and coming of the railroad ===
Coal was discovered in the valley in 1875, and two years later a small mine was opened on the western slopes of the canyon, with the coal transported out along narrow roads. The winter of 1877 came early and was very severe, stranding the miners in the coal pit and keeping them snowbound until the following February. The ordeal led the miners to name their forced camp "Winter Quarters". It became one of the first commercial coal mines in the state. Most of the first miners at the Winter Quarters were Mormon converts from the coal districts of Wales, England and Scotland. One of them, David Williams, leased the Winter Quarters Mine from the Pleasant Valley Coal Company from 1880 to 1885, operating in the dual capacity of mine manager and bishop of the local LDS ward. When the Rio Grande Western Railway acquired the coal company, they undertook the development of a new mine on Mud Creek, a mile from Winter Quarters, much to the chagrin of Williams, who protested that the new mine infringed on his lease. Because Bishop Williams controlled the Mormon miners, the Pleasant Valley Coal Company brought in Chinese laborers to work the Mud Creek mine. Soon a large contingent of Finns were recruited, along with Italian, Greek, and other Scandinavian workers.

As coal veins commenced to be worked, it was not long before the discoverers found out that the supply seemed inexhaustible. The railway companies finding that the coal fields were of such magnitude and covered so much territory, began to survey for practicable routes to reach the coal. The route through Spanish Fork Canyon was finally decided upon, and a narrow-gauge railroad was built into Scofield. Before the railroad was completed, winter set in, and the last few miles were laid upon the ice and snow as it was impossible to find the ground due to the snow drifts. The Union Pacific Coal Company claimed all of the land on the town site, and those building a home were compelled to lease the spot of ground desired from this company. Not knowing how long they would be permitted to remain as laborers in the mines, the men did not build elaborate homes, as they knew that should the work cease, they would be compelled to sacrifice their homes. Log cabins were the order of the day, as lath and plaster was out of reach on account of high prices. The Union Pacific still continued to collect their ground rent, and the knowledge that the miners had of the company that was ruling the camp at that time deterred them from beautifying their homes as they desired.

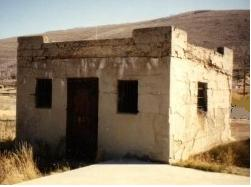
Scofield Utah's historic jail

However, this state of affairs was not to continue for long, as the rights of the company to hold the land came to be questioned. Part of their land was jumped, and their title was found to be imperfect. In fact, they had no title whatever to the land now incorporated in the townsite. The business district was more than a mile long and boasted dozens of substantial stone buildings, including an Odd Fellows Hall. As the mine and the community grew, new and more efficient methods were sought to move the coal from the mines, and so the Utah & Pleasant Valley Railroad was constructed, running from Springville to Winter Quarters and Scofield. It connected with the Denver & Rio Grande line in Colton 18 miles (29 km) to the northeast.

In 1882, the Utah Fuel Company took over the mine and town, and it soon became a subsidiary of the Denver & Rio Grande Railroad. The region continued to thrive until 1900, when there were several hundred men in the mines and residents that numbered as high as 1,800. The mine was considered to be the safest in the region and according to reports, was free from the gases that plagued so many other coal operations.

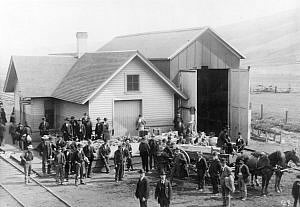
Coffins waiting for transport to disaster site

=== Disaster ===
On May 1, 1900, an errant spark touched off the fine haze of coal dust deep underground, and the Winter Quarters #4 mine exploded with fury. Exactly 100 of the men were killed in an instant, and another 99 died from the poisonous afterdamp, making this one of the worst coal mine disasters in history. Death came so swiftly that some of the mineworkers were found still clutching their tools. That one moment of time left 105 widows and 270 fatherless children behind. Almost 150 of the slain miners were buried in the cemetery in nearby Scofield, and two special funeral trains carried the rest of the victims to burial grounds in Utah and in other states.

=== Decline ===
On May 28, just four weeks after the disaster in Number Four, coal mining resumed at Winter Quarters. While some of those who had escaped the explosion left the area for other work, many others returned to the mines. The dead were soon replaced, though production evidently suffered somewhat from the loss of more experienced miners. Despite declining profitability, the Winter Quarters mines continued to operate until the 1930s. The coal tipple and other large structures were dismantled for their salvage value during World War II; the chapel and the boarding house were leveled.

Scofield, sustained by several mines in Pleasant Valley, was still the largest town in Carbon County in 1915, when its citizens made an attempt to have the county seat moved to their community from Price. By the 1920s, however, the coal industry in Pleasant Valley was clearly in decline and most mines ceased operation causing the town to lose nearly all its residents.

== Geography ==
The town of Scofield lies in the bituminous coal field of Carbon County, Utah, about 19 miles (31 km) from the main line of the Rio Grande Western Railroad, and is nestled among the hills that surround the upper part of Pleasant Valley. The town is situated along Mud Creek, just south (upstream) of the Scofield Reservoir. The outlet of the reservoir is the Price River, which flows southeast to the Green River and is thus part of the Colorado River basin.

According to the United States Census Bureau, Scofield has a total area of 0.69 square miles (1.8 km^{2}), all land.

Utah State Route 96 passes through Scofield, leading north then east 17 miles (27 km) to U.S. Route 6 near Colton, and south 6 miles (9.7 km) to its end at Clear Creek.

=== Climate ===
Scofield has an alpine subarctic climate (Köppen Dfc) with enormous yearly snowfall in its long, cold winters due to its location in the Wasatch Range. Summertime on the other hand is pleasant, with warm days and crisp, cool nights hovering not too far above freezing.

Climate data for Scofield, Utah (Skyline Mine), 1991–2020 normals, extremes 1893–present
| Month | Jan | Feb | Mar | Apr | May | Jun | Jul | Aug | Sep | Oct | Nov | Dec | Year |
|---|---|---|---|---|---|---|---|---|---|---|---|---|---|
| Record high °F (°C) | 56 (13) | 56 (13) | 67 (19) | 74 (23) | 88 (31) | 91 (33) | 98 (37) | 94 (34) | 84 (29) | 75 (24) | 67 (19) | 59 (15) | 98 (37) |
| Mean maximum °F (°C) | 45.8 (7.7) | 46.0 (7.8) | 53.3 (11.8) | 62.0 (16.7) | 71.3 (21.8) | 79.9 (26.6) | 84.0 (28.9) | 81.5 (27.5) | 76.9 (24.9) | 67.4 (19.7) | 55.7 (13.2) | 46.4 (8.0) | 84.6 (29.2) |
| Mean daily maximum °F (°C) | 30.4 (−0.9) | 30.9 (−0.6) | 37.7 (3.2) | 43.7 (6.5) | 54.4 (12.4) | 66.4 (19.1) | 73.9 (23.3) | 71.7 (22.1) | 63.2 (17.3) | 50.1 (10.1) | 37.7 (3.2) | 29.8 (−1.2) | 49.2 (9.5) |
| Daily mean °F (°C) | 21.8 (−5.7) | 22.5 (−5.3) | 28.6 (−1.9) | 34.1 (1.2) | 43.5 (6.4) | 53.4 (11.9) | 60.8 (16.0) | 59.0 (15.0) | 51.0 (10.6) | 39.7 (4.3) | 28.5 (−1.9) | 21.1 (−6.1) | 38.7 (3.7) |
| Mean daily minimum °F (°C) | 13.1 (−10.5) | 14.0 (−10.0) | 19.5 (−6.9) | 24.4 (−4.2) | 32.6 (0.3) | 40.5 (4.7) | 47.8 (8.8) | 46.4 (8.0) | 38.8 (3.8) | 29.3 (−1.5) | 19.3 (−7.1) | 12.4 (−10.9) | 28.2 (−2.1) |
| Mean minimum °F (°C) | −5.1 (−20.6) | −4.7 (−20.4) | 3.1 (−16.1) | 9.8 (−12.3) | 18.4 (−7.6) | 27.4 (−2.6) | 38.6 (3.7) | 37.3 (2.9) | 24.7 (−4.1) | 13.5 (−10.3) | −0.4 (−18.0) | −6.4 (−21.3) | −10.4 (−23.6) |
| Record low °F (°C) | −41 (−41) | −38 (−39) | −27 (−33) | −12 (−24) | 9 (−13) | 14 (−10) | 24 (−4) | 22 (−6) | 12 (−11) | −9 (−23) | −25 (−32) | −37 (−38) | −41 (−41) |
| Average precipitation inches (mm) | 3.03 (77) | 2.73 (69) | 2.43 (62) | 2.66 (68) | 1.93 (49) | 1.05 (27) | 1.48 (38) | 1.62 (41) | 1.89 (48) | 1.94 (49) | 2.31 (59) | 2.91 (74) | 25.98 (661) |
| Average snowfall inches (cm) | 42.5 (108) | 40.7 (103) | 29.6 (75) | 24.5 (62) | 7.2 (18) | 0.5 (1.3) | 0.0 (0.0) | 0.1 (0.25) | 0.6 (1.5) | 8.0 (20) | 28.9 (73) | 42.8 (109) | 225.4 (571.05) |
| Average extreme snow depth inches (cm) | 30.7 (78) | 28.5 (72) | 20.0 (51) | 9.3 (24) | 3.7 (9.4) | 0.4 (1.0) | 0.0 (0.0) | 0.0 (0.0) | 0.4 (1.0) | 4.7 (12) | 15.1 (38) | 23.8 (60) | 35.9 (91) |
| Average precipitation days (≥ 0.01 in) | 11.9 | 11.8 | 10.0 | 10.7 | 9.6 | 6.1 | 8.1 | 10.1 | 8.2 | 8.3 | 9.2 | 10.9 | 114.9 |
| Average snowy days (≥ 0.1 in) | 11.5 | 11.2 | 8.8 | 7.7 | 2.3 | 0.3 | 0.0 | 0.0 | 0.3 | 3.1 | 7.9 | 10.4 | 63.5 |
Source 1: NOAA
Source 2: National Weather Service

== Demographics ==
Historical population
| Census | Pop. | Note | %± |
|---|---|---|---|
| 1890 | 680 | | — |
| 1900 | 642 | | −5.6% |
| 1910 | 746 | | 16.2% |
| 1920 | 678 | | −9.1% |
| 1930 | 295 | | −56.5% |
| 1940 | 262 | | −11.2% |
| 1950 | 236 | | −9.9% |
| 1960 | 158 | | −33.1% |
| 1970 | 71 | | −55.1% |
| 1980 | 105 | | 47.9% |
| 1990 | 43 | | −59.0% |
| 2000 | 28 | | −34.9% |
| 2010 | 22 | | −21.4% |
| 2020 | 26 | | 18.2% |
U.S. Decennial Census

As of the census of 2000, there were 28 people, 12 households, and 9 families residing in the town. The population density was 55.9 people per square mile (21.6/km^{2}). There were 78 housing units at an average density of 155.6 per square mile (60.2/km^{2}). The racial makeup of the town was 100.00% White.

There were 12 households, out of which 25.0% had children under the age of 18 living with them, 66.7% were married couples living together, 8.3% had a female householder with no husband present, and 16.7% were non-families. 16.7% of all households were made up of individuals, and 8.3% had someone living alone who was 65 years of age or older. The average household size was 2.33 and the average family size was 2.50.

In the town, the population was spread out, with 14.3% under the age of 18, 10.7% from 18 to 24, 25.0% from 25 to 44, 28.6% from 45 to 64, and 21.4% who were 65 years of age or older. The median age was 45 years. For every 100 females, there were 75.0 males. For every 100 females age 18 and over, there were 100.0 males.

The median income for a household in the town was $26,250, and the median income for a family was $28,750. Males had a median income of $26,250 versus $14,375 for females. The per capita income for the town was $10,764. There were no families and 9.1% of the population living below the poverty line, including no under eighteens and none of those over 64.

== Scofield State Park ==
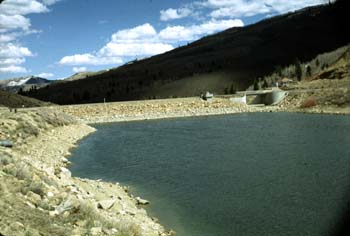
The Scofield Reservoir Dam, Utah

Scofield State Park surrounds Scofield Reservoir and has three different camping areas: Mountain View, Madsen Bay, and Lake Side. Mountain View is a 34-unit campground that includes restrooms, heated showers, fish cleaning and disposal stations, a group use pavilion, a boat launching ramp, and rental boats. Madsen Bay is a 40-unit campground with restrooms, fish cleaning and disposal areas, a boat ramp, and parking for day use. Lake Side has no camping areas and is strictly day use, offering restrooms, a group use pavilion and a fishing platform for the disabled.

== Clear Creek Camp ==
Clear Creek Camp is an outdoor education center located 2 miles (3 km) south of the town of Scofield, for post-fifth grade students in the Alpine School District. Each summer, Clear Creek Camp hosts approximately 1,100 students. The summer camp experience is designed to educate students about the outdoors and help foster a deep appreciation for the abundant natural resources and beauty in their surroundings. The camp has its roots in an outdoor education program held at Central Elementary School in the 1940s. Between 1940 and the 1960s, the program eventually grew to be so successful that a summer camp was requested. It was held at various locations for many years, including the town of Clear Creek for which it is named. After being there for a few years, property became available from Questar (then Mountain Fuel) with six cabins and a multi-purpose facility in 1973. The facilities were ready to use for groups of students in 1974, and Alpine School District has used the same grounds since then.

== See also ==
- List of cities and towns in Utah
