= Wasatch Plateau =

Plateau in central Utah, United States

Coordinates: 39°18′41″N 111°20′12″W

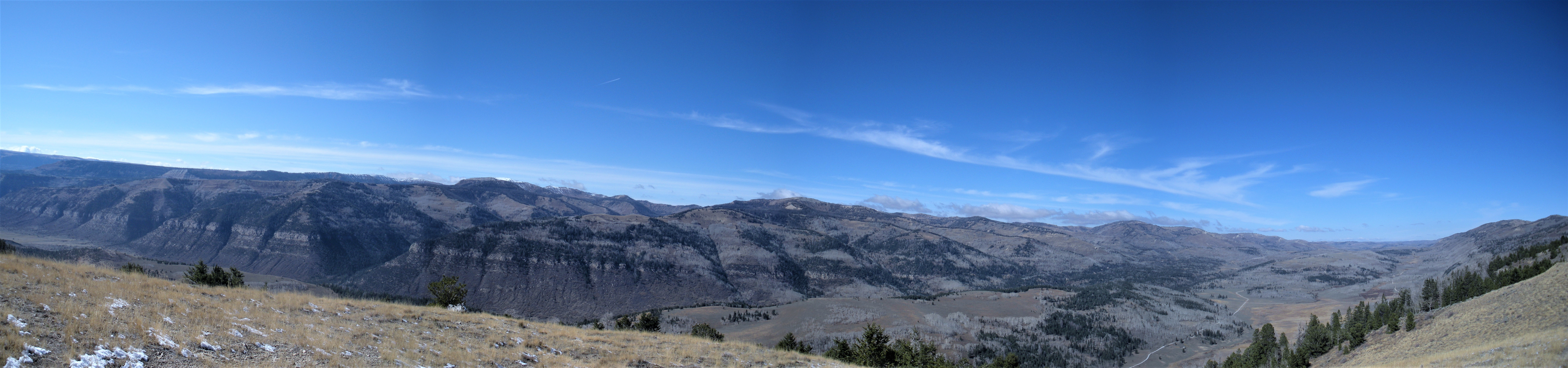
Wasatch Plateau panorama, November 2009

The Wasatch Plateau is a plateau located southeast of the southernmost part of the Wasatch Range in central Utah. It is a part of the Colorado Plateau.

== Geography ==
The plateau has an elevation of 8,825 ft (2,690 m) and includes an area of 2,792 sq mi (7,230 km^{2}). Its highest point is South Tent Mountain, with an elevation of 11,263 ft (3,433 m). The plateau is roughly bordered by the Spanish Fork Canyon to the north, the Price Canyon to the northeast, the Castle Valley to the east and southeast, Interstate 70 to the south, the Plateau Valley and the Sevier Plateau to the southwest, and the Sanpete Valley to the northwest. The majority of the plateau is within the boundaries of the Manti–La Sal National Forest and is managed by the United States Forest Service.
