= Fairview, Utah =

City in Utah, United States

- City
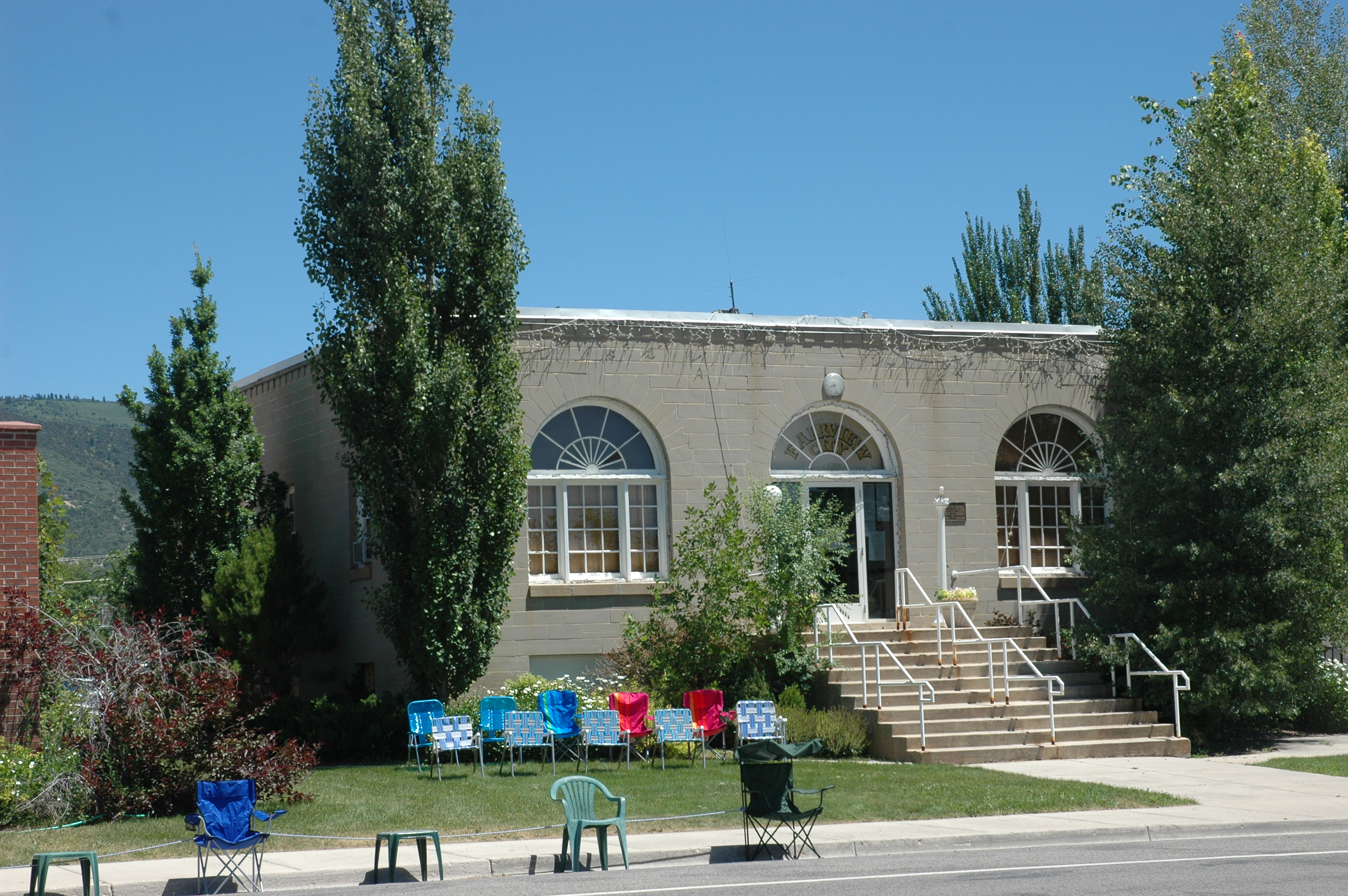
- Fairview City Hall, July 2011

- Location in Sanpete County and the state of Utah.
- Coordinates: 39°37′44″N 111°26′18″W
- Country: United States
- State: Utah
- County: Sanpete
- Founded: 1859
- Founder: James N. Jones

Government
  - Mayor: Brad Welch

Area
  - Total: 1.26 sq mi (3.26 km^{2})
  - Land: 1.26 sq mi (3.26 km^{2})
  - Water: 0 sq mi (0.00 km^{2})
- Elevation: 5,948 ft (1,813 m)

Population (2020)
  - Total: 1,203
  - Density: 955.8/sq mi (369.02/km^{2})
- Time zone: UTC-7 (Mountain (MST))
  - Summer (DST): UTC-6 (MDT)
- ZIP code: 84629
- Area code: 435
- FIPS code: 49-24630
- GNIS feature ID: 1440983
- Website: fairviewcityut.gov

Fairview is a city in northern Sanpete County, Utah, United States. The population was 1,203 at the 2020 census.

== History ==
Located at the confluence of the San Pitch River and Cottonwood Creek, Fairview is the largest city in the northeast end of the Sanpete Valley. Founded in 1859, soon after the resettlement of nearby Mount Pleasant, Fairview was one of the first new towns established during the second wave of Mormon settlement in Sanpete County.

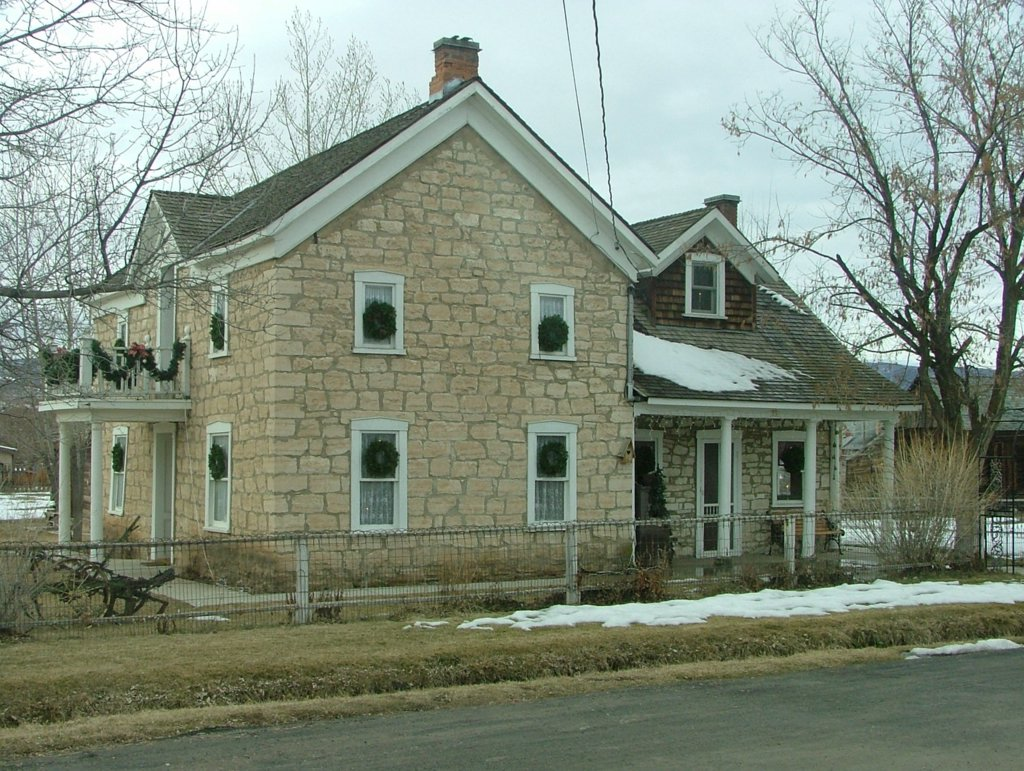
Pioneer-era house in Fairview, December 2004

Impressed with the area's possibilities while gathering wild hay in early 1859, James Naylor Jones, Isaac Young Vance, Warren P. Brady, and Jehu Cox wrote to Brigham Young asking for permission to create a settlement. The church president responded pragmatically, "If there is water for thirty families, you have my permission." At an organizing meeting held on 1 October 1859 in Mt. Pleasant, James N. Jones was chosen to lead a band of about twenty families interested in the new colonizing opportunity. The town site was surveyed, and by the end of 1860, a large log meeting house had been completed to house church, school, and social functions. Rows of poplars were planted, streets were graded, and fences were constructed as Fairview took on the appearance of the ubiquitous Mormon village. In 1864 the town obtained a post office and forsook its original name of North Bend in favor of the more descriptive name Fairview because it "commands an excellent view of the great granary extending south even beyond Manti, thirty miles distant."

During the Black Hawk War of the mid-1860s, some Fairview residents moved to Mt. Pleasant for protection after a few men were killed in deadly skirmishes. Those who remained complied with Brigham Young's instructions to build a fort. By the end of 1866, a thick rock wall ten feet high enclosed the center of town. Within a few years, the conflict diminished enough that aggressive settlement and community development commenced. In the ensuing decade, Fairview's population burgeoned to more than 1,000, making it the fourth largest in Sanpete by 1880. In 1900 and again in 1940, the town exceeded 1,700 people; however, in 1980, the population was just 900, ranking Fairview sixth in size among the county's nineteen communities.

Fairview shared its Mormon origin, governance and its overwhelming cultural and religious makeup with its neighboring villages. By 1880, Fairview had the smallest percentage of foreign-born, married adults (50.3 percent) of any of the major towns in a county which averaged 72.2 percent foreign-born. Initially the "child" of larger Mt. Pleasant six miles south, Fairview eventually became its rival, competing vigorously for land, water, timber, grazing rights, and what it considered a fair share of church and government funds. The town's Mormon bishops sometimes found themselves in the center of bitter disputes with leaders of other communities, to the dismay of local apostle and stake president Orson Hyde, who was assigned to arbitrate disputes and settle contentions.

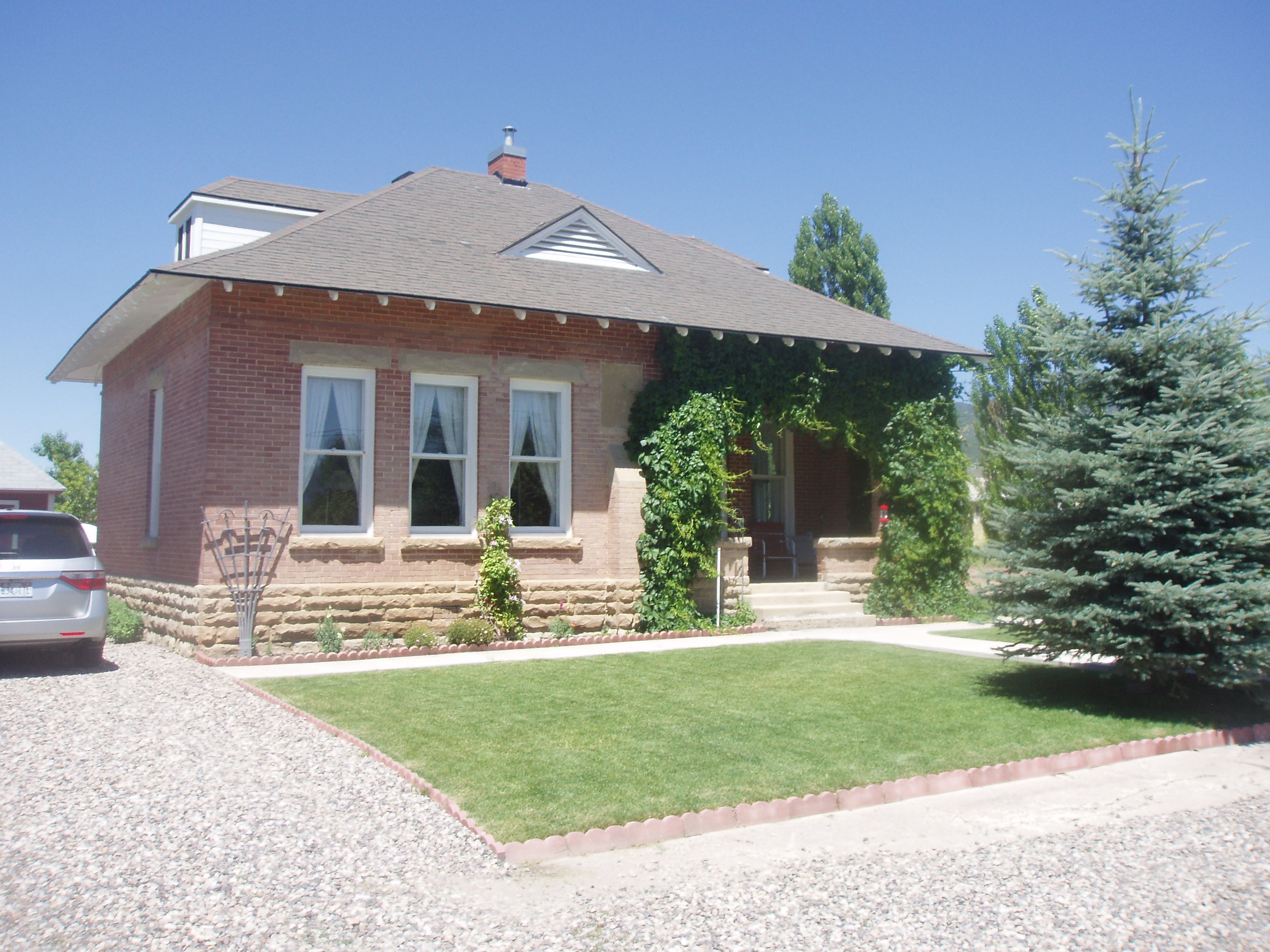
Fairview Utah Tithing Office, July 2011

The people of Fairview took full part in the cooperative society of their times. In 1874 they enthusiastically followed the church council and established a united order. Stock certificates (7,500 shares) were sold at $10 a share to fund the venture. But like most of the other united orders in the territory, Fairview's was doomed to rapid failure. Poor crops and undercapitalization nearly forced its demise in 1874 after only a few months of existence. Despite efforts to keep it alive, the order was abandoned in 1876.

From its first inception, Fairview's economic base has depended on agriculture and the livestock industry. Following trapper Barney Ward's lead, irrigation ditches were dug and reservoir sites identified soon after settlement. Food crops, hay, and grains were planted, and in 1870, the town's first flour mill was constructed south of town. Livestock raising, ranging from beef and sheep to chickens and turkeys, has persisted throughout Fairview's history. Because of its proximity to canyon forests, sawmills were established in the early decades to support the lumber industry. By the start of the 20th century, there were half a dozen steam sawmills in the mountains east of town.

Beginning in the late 1860s, Fairview developed a one-street commercial district along the old territorial road running through the middle of town. In 1869 Zion's Cooperative Mercantile Institution was started in Fairview. Other stores and businesses followed so that by 1900 Fairview's downtown could boast of a public library, several general stores, a furniture store, a creamery, a harness shop, a butcher shop, and two hotels. In 1881 a Presbyterian mission school was funded, with a chapel erected in 1894. A public school system was established in the 1890s; 497 of Fairview's 1,800 population in 1898 were students. Recreational needs were accommodated in a social hall and the Eclipse Pavilion.

As was common across the American West, the arrival of the Rio Grande Western Railroad in the 1890s bolstered the town's ability to import equipment and export its surplus goods, quickly growing Fairview's economic strength as it did for other cities in Sanpete county. Its fortunes rose and fell with the cycle of the regional economy after the railroad-enhanced boom and its population high-water mark was reached in 1900.

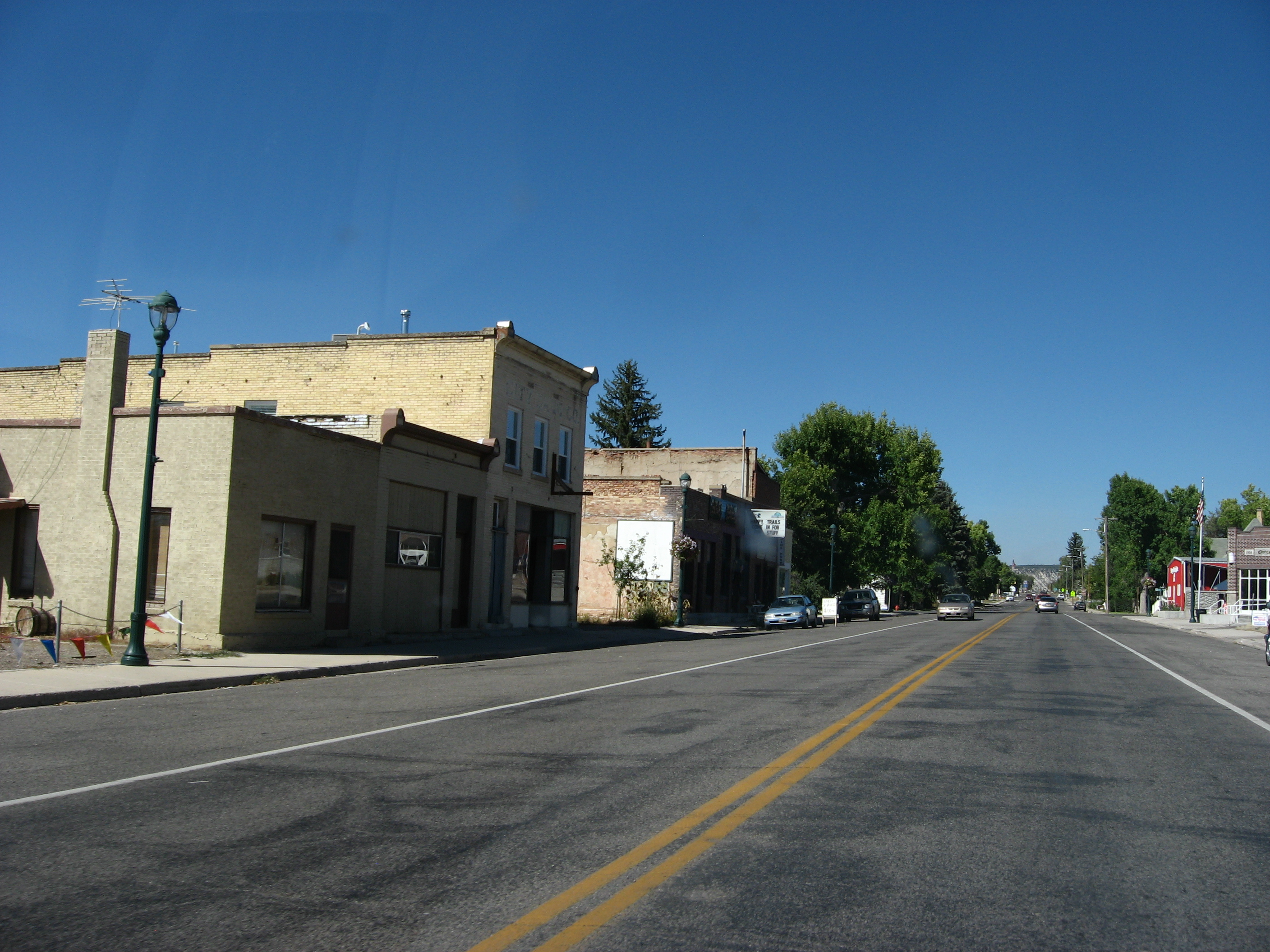
Looking north along State Street (US-89) in Fairview, September 2010

The 20th century brought diverse businesses and industries, including dairies, roller mills, coal mining, and fur ranches. The Fairview State Bank was organized in 1914. In the 21st century, agriculture and livestock raising remain the dominant ways to make a living. While other parts of the county raise cattle or turkeys as the leading cash livestock, sheep ranching continues to outpace all other economies in Fairview, accounting for 46 percent of the farm and ranch operations in northeast Sanpete County.

Fairview's architectural legacy appears in its remaining historic structures; constructed of various materials, in crafts and styles employed by Fairview's forebears. The two 1920s-30s masonry LDS meetinghouses replaced simpler early edifices and reflect a continuing Church of Jesus Christ of Latter-day Saints presence. The two-story rock school (now museum) and brick town hall indicate the town's bygone stature. The Fairview Roller Mills is a reminder of the agrarian foundation of Fairview's existence. Business buildings remain clustered along Main Street, while houses and outbuildings dot the blocks to the east and west. Many remnants of the rural landscape remain to identify key elements of Fairview's history and are reflected in its present character.

== Geography ==
Fairview is located at 39°37′44″N 111°26′18″W (39.628890, -111.438264).

According to the United States Census Bureau, the city has a total area of 1.2 square miles (3.2 km^{2}), all land.

=== Climate ===
Large seasonal temperature differences typify this climatic region, with warm to hot (and often humid) summers and cold (sometimes severely cold) winters. According to the Köppen Climate Classification system, Fairview has a humid continental climate, abbreviated "Dfb" on climate maps.

== Demographics ==
Historical population
Census	Pop.	Note	%±
1860	297		—
1870	531		78.8%
1880	863		62.5%
1890	844		−2.2%
1900	1,119		32.6%
1910	1,218		8.8%
1920	2,287		87.8%
1930	2,076		−9.2%
1940	2,143		3.2%
1950	974		−54.5%
1960	655		−32.8%
1970	696		6.3%
1980	916		31.6%
1990	960		4.8%
2000	1,160		20.8%
2010	1,247		7.5%
2020	1,203		−3.5%
U.S. Decennial Census

=== 2020 census ===
As of the 2020 census, Fairview had a population of 1,203. The median age was 38.5 years, 30.4% of residents were under the age of 18, and 19.5% of residents were 65 years of age or older. For every 100 females there were 98.5 males, and for every 100 females age 18 and over there were 92.0 males age 18 and over.

0.0% of residents lived in urban areas, while 100.0% lived in rural areas.

There were 421 households in Fairview, of which 35.4% had children under the age of 18 living in them. Of all households, 62.9% were married-couple households, 12.6% were households with a male householder and no spouse or partner present, and 20.7% were households with a female householder and no spouse or partner present. About 20.6% of all households were made up of individuals and 11.6% had someone living alone who was 65 years of age or older.

There were 493 housing units, of which 14.6% were vacant. The homeowner vacancy rate was 0.3% and the rental vacancy rate was 12.3%.

Racial composition as of the 2020 census
Race	Number	Percent
White	1,160	96.4%
Black or African American	3	0.2%
American Indian and Alaska Native	0	0.0%
Asian	1	0.1%
Native Hawaiian and Other Pacific Islander	2	0.2%
Some other race	11	0.9%
Two or more races	26	2.2%
Hispanic or Latino (of any race)	22	1.8%

=== 2000 census ===
As of the 2000 census, there were 1,160 people, 371 households, and 294 families residing in the city. The population density was 930.7 people per square mile (358.3/km^{2}). There were 416 housing units at an average density of 333.8 per square mile (128.5/km^{2}). The racial makeup of the city was 96.03% White, 0.09% African American, 0.86% Native American, 0.43% Asian, 0.52% Pacific Islander, 0.95% from other races, and 1.12% from two or more races. Hispanic or Latino of any race were 2.16% of the population.

There were 371 households, out of which 44.7% had children under 18 living with them, 73.0% were married couples living together, 5.4% had a female householder with no husband present, and 20.5% were non-families. 19.4% of all households were made up of individuals, and 12.7% had someone living alone who was 65 years of age or older. The average household size was 3.11, and the average family size was 3.58.

In the city, the population was spread out, with 35.8% under 18, 7.8% from 18 to 24, 23.0% from 25 to 44, 18.7% from 45 to 64, and 14.7% who were 65 years of age or older. The median age was 31 years. For every 100 females, there were 100.0 males. For every 100 females aged 18 and over, there were 93.0 males.

The median income for a household in the city was $34,946, and the median income for a family was $38,472. Males had a median income of $30,938 versus $19,107 for females. The per capita income for the city was $13,506. About 7.8% of families and 8.9% of the population were below the poverty line, including 10.3% of those under age 18 and 7.6% of those aged 65 or over.

== Education ==
Fairview is located in the North Sanpete School District, and has an elementary school.

North Sanpete High School is the district's comprehensive high school.

== Government ==
The Fairview city council consists of five council members. The current mayor of Fairview is Brad Welch.

== Notable people and places ==
- Spencer Cox, Governor of Utah , and former Mayor of Fairview
- Glade Peterson, 1928–1990. Founder, Utah Opera Company. Principal Tenor for Zurich Opera Company for 12 years. Guest artist at Milan, Paris, Hamburg, and Vienna Opera houses. Starred with Houston Grand Opera and San Francisco Opera. Sung with the NY Metropolitan Opera.
- Fairview Museum of History and Art

== See also ==
- List of cities and towns in Utah
