= Castle Valley (Carbon, Emery, and Sevier counties, Utah) =

Valley in Utah, United States

- Location within Utah Location within the United States
- Length: 16 mi (26 km)

Geography
- Country: United States
- State: Utah
- Counties: Carbon, Emery, and Sevier
- Borders on: Book Cliffs; Tushar Mountains; Black Mountains (Utah)
- Coordinates: 38°57′46″N 111°07′53″W
- River: Beaver River
- Interactive map of Castle Valley

The Castle Valley is a valley in Carbon, Emery, and Sevier counties in central Utah, United States.

== Description ==
The valley is bounded by the Book Cliffs to the north, Cedar Mountain, and the Wasatch Plateau on the west.

== Communities ==
=== Carbon County ===
- Carbonville
- Price
- Wellington
- West Wood

=== Emery County ===
- Castle Dale
- Clawson
- Cleveland
- Elmo
- Ferron
- Huntington
- Lawrence
- Molen
- Moore
- Orangeville

== Highways ==
- US 6
- US 191
- SR-10
- SR-29
- SR-31
- SR-55 /
  US 6 Bus.
- SR-57
- SR-155

== See also ==
- List of valleys of Utah
