= Desert Lake, Utah =

Ghost town in Emery County, Utah, United States

- Ghost town
- Location within Utah Location within the United States
- Coordinates: 39°22′24″N 110°46′57″W
- Country: United States
- State: Utah
- County: Emery
- Founded: 1885
- Abandoned: 1910
- Elevation: 5,600 ft (1,700 m)

Desert Lake is a ghost town in Castle Valley in northern Emery County, Utah, United States. It was inhabited from 1885 to about 1910.

== History ==
In 1885, several families moved from the nearby town of Cleveland to an area they called Desert Lake, and built a 500-foot (150 m) embankment dam to impound a 300-acre (1.2 km^{2}) irrigation reservoir (Desert Lake). In 1896, the dam broke, causing significant damage. The LDS Church provided $1000 to rebuild the dam, and also to extend a ditch southwest to Cleveland.

The 1900 United States Census reported Desert Lake's population at 127. Six years after the Census was taken, in 1906, the Desert Lake area was surveyed. An LDS church, a general store, several frame homes, and a school were constructed. The general store also served as the town's post office.

A problem throughout the valley occurred as farmers irrigated land, which dropped the water table and caused alkali in the soil to rise. The alkaline soil eroded adobe structures and caused many crops to fail. As the alkali in the soil concentrated, the residents of Desert Lake moved about 6 miles (9.7 km) away and founded the town of Victor. A few log homes make up what's left of the town of Desert Lake.

== See also ==
- List of ghost towns in Utah
