= Victor, Utah =

Victor, Utah Desert Lake
- Ghost town
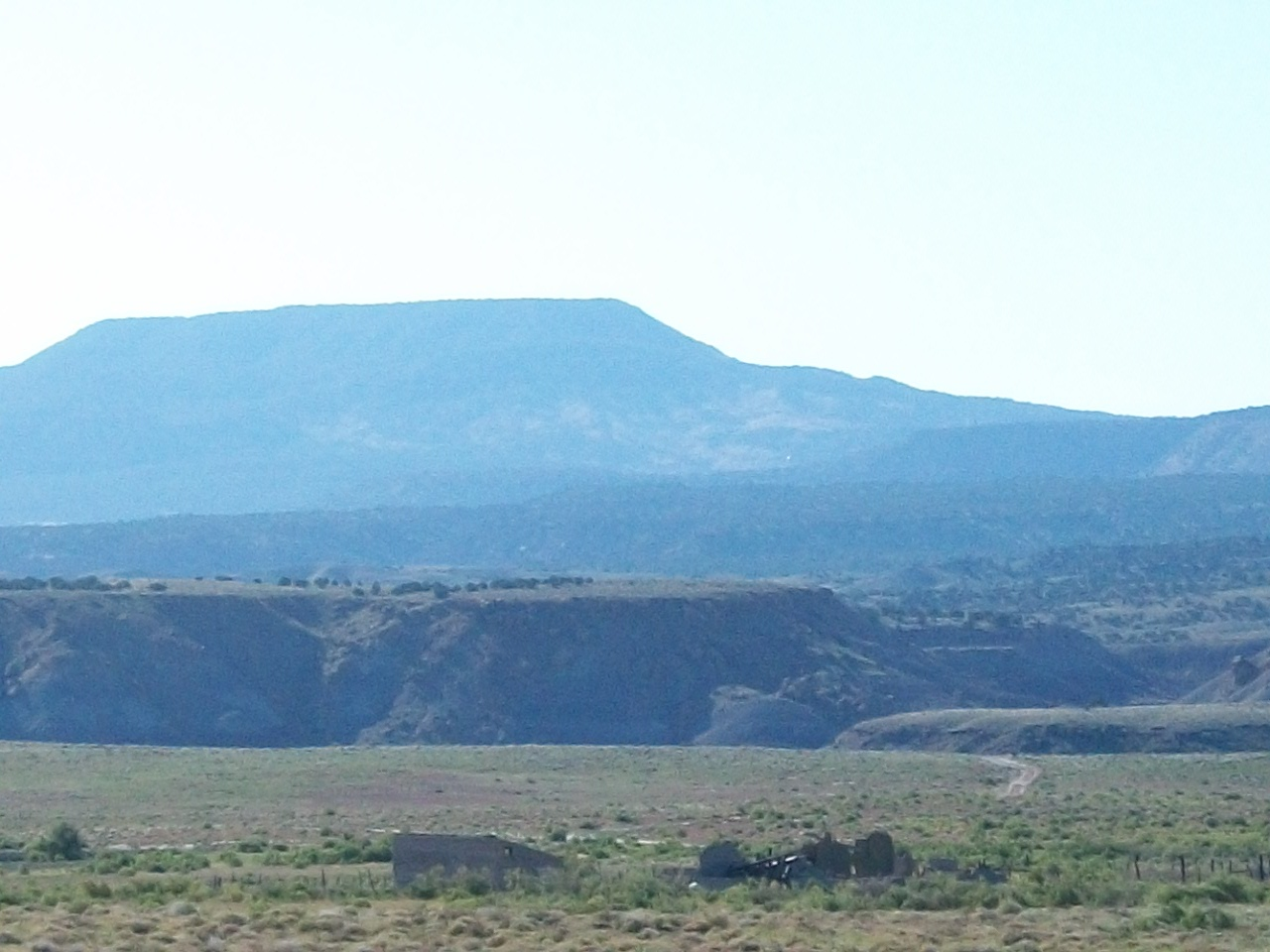
- Victor, as seen from a dirt road near Elmo, August 2010

- Location within Utah Location within the United States
- Coordinates: 39°24′05″N 110°42′56″W
- Country: United States
- State: Utah
- County: Emery
- Founded: 1910
- Abandoned: 1920
- Named for: George W. Victor
- Elevation: 5,525 ft (1,684 m)
- GNIS feature ID: 1437712

Victor (also known as Desert Lake) is a ghost town in Castle Valley in northern Emery County, Utah, United States.

== Description ==
The town was inhabited from 1910 to 1920. The community has the name of George W. Victor, a postal worker.

== History ==
Victor was established in 1910, when a burst dam treated the soil near Desert Lake with alkaline water, preventing farming. Residents of Desert Lake, a town located near the lake, had to relocate to a more fertile area in order to continue farming. They chose a spot 6 miles (9.7 km) east of Elmo. The town was soon named Victor. Homes and a schoolhouse were built in town. Farming was more difficult at Victor, because the area was much drier than Desert Lake. Sand dunes located near the town were often blown by wind onto farmland and the surrounding buildings. In 1920, the continuous lack of rain caused the residents of Victor to leave. The schoolhouse and a couple of foundations remain in the town site.

== See also ==
- List of ghost towns in Utah
