= Castle Valley =

Castle Valley may refer to the following places in the United States:

== Communities ==
- Castle Valley, Pennsylvania, former community in Bucks County that is now part of Doylestown, Pennsylvania
- Castle Valley, Utah, a town in Grand County

== Valleys ==
- Castle Valley (California), within the Tahoe National Forest in Nevada County, California
- Castle Valley (Carbon, Emery, and Sevier counties, Utah), a large valley along the southeast edge of the Wasatch Plateau
- Castle Valley (Grand County, Utah), a valley in Utah wherein the town of Castle Valley is located
- Castle Valley (Iron County, Utah), a small valley in Utah in the Dixie National Forest on the eastern edge of the county
