= Connellsville (disambiguation) =

Connellsville or Connelsville may refer to:

- Connellsville, Pennsylvania, a city in Fayette County
  - Connellsville Township, Fayette County, Pennsylvania
  - South Connellsville, Pennsylvania, a borough in Fayette County
- Connellsville, Utah, a ghost town in Emery County
- Connelsville, Missouri, an unincorporated community in Nineveh Township
