= Rochester Rock Art Panel =

Petroglyphs in Emery County, Utah

Rochester Creek Rock Art Panel
- Location within the United States
- Location: Emery County, Utah, USA
- Nearest city: Emery
- Coordinates: 38°54′11″N 111°11′53″W
- Governing body: Bureau of Land Management

The Rochester Rock Art Panel in Emery County, Utah consists of a large number of petroglyphs of various ages. Some are prehistoric rock art, of either Fremont culture origin or Barrier Canyon Style. Others are probably modern, depicting horses, for example. And some are perhaps of very recent origin, most likely the work of white explorers, settlers, and/or tourists. There is a great deal of graffiti near the main panel that is obviously of fairly recent origin. The majority of the panel is covered with a dark desert varnish which contrasts nicely with the light sandstone that is exposed when the petroglyphs are pecked into the surface. There are several sections of very light stone in the center of the panel where it appears some of original stone was removed, probably by collectors who were after the figures inscribed there.

The panel is located 3 miles east of Emery, Utah but is accessed via a graded road coming from a turnoff to the north, near the town of Moore. To get to the panel drive to the turnoff between mile markers 16 and 17 on highway 10 between the towns of Emery and Ferron. Take the paved road heading east to Moore for about half a mile. Turn south onto a well-graded road and drive for about 4 miles, passing a radio tower on the way. From the parking lot an obvious hiking trail of about a half mile leads along the side of a small canyon to the panel.

== Gallery ==
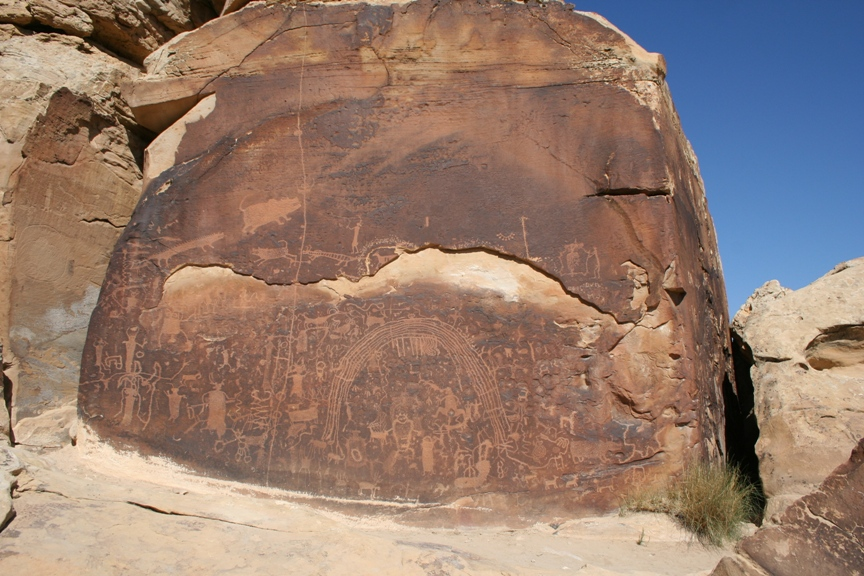
Overview head on

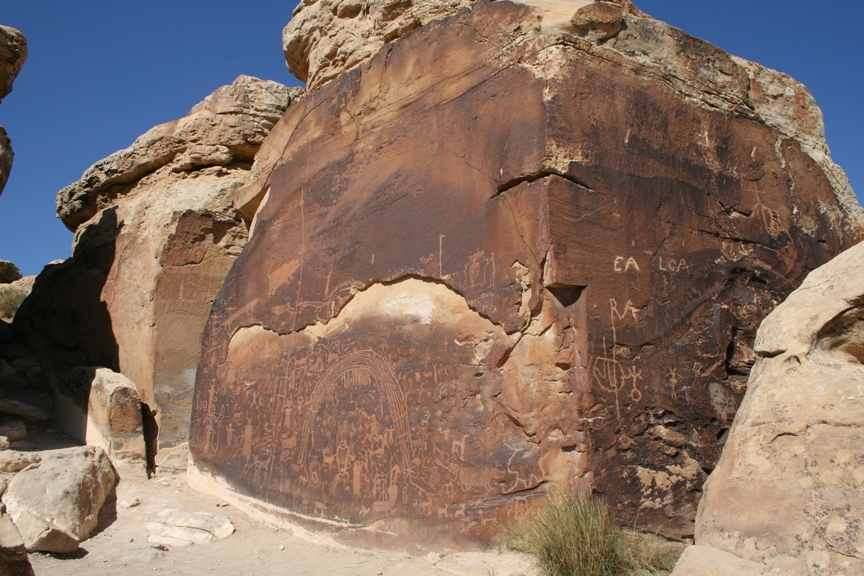
Overview from an angle

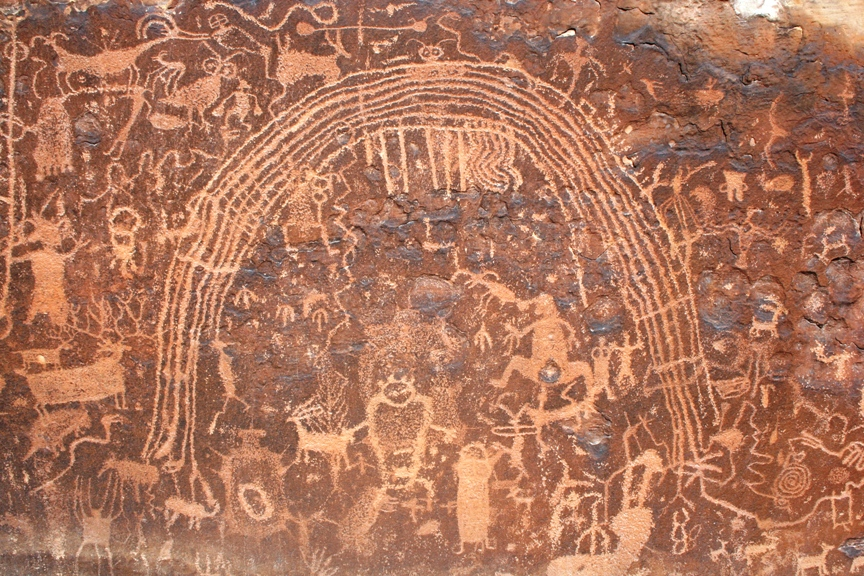
Detail of the rainbow

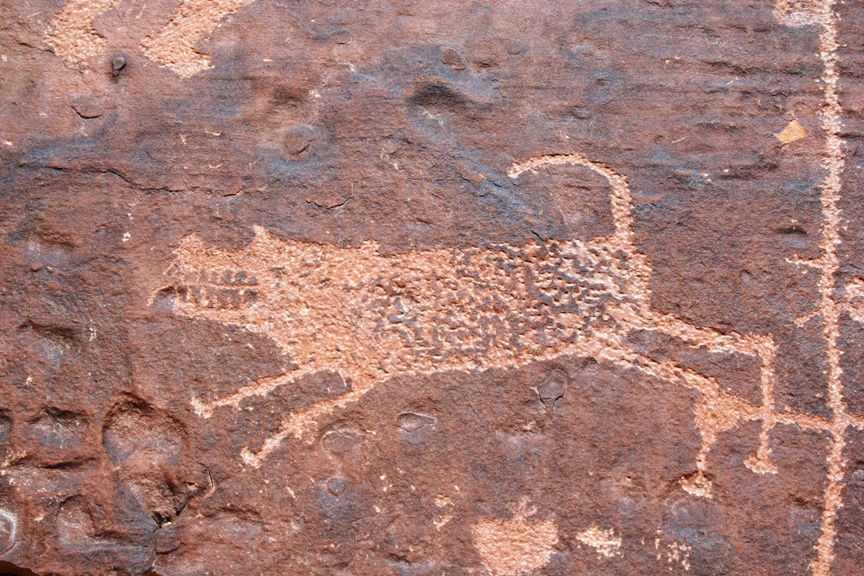
Detail

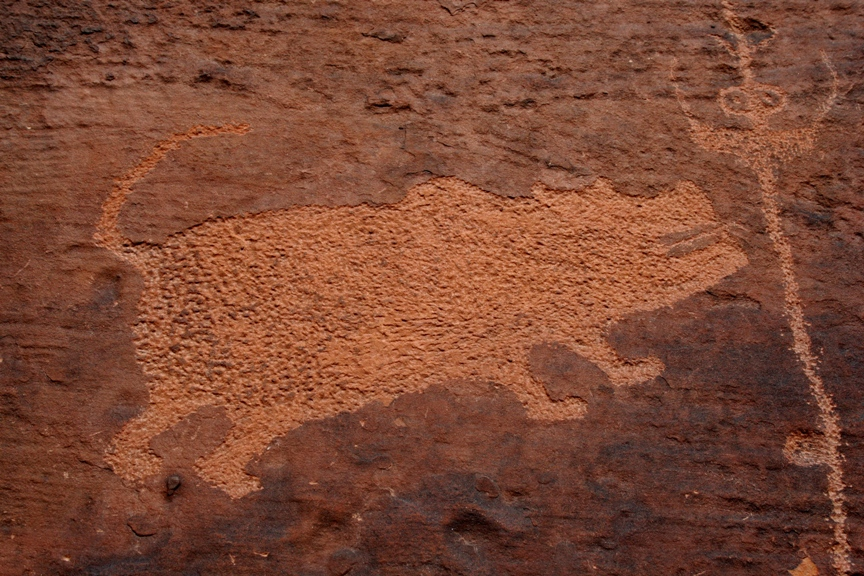
Detail

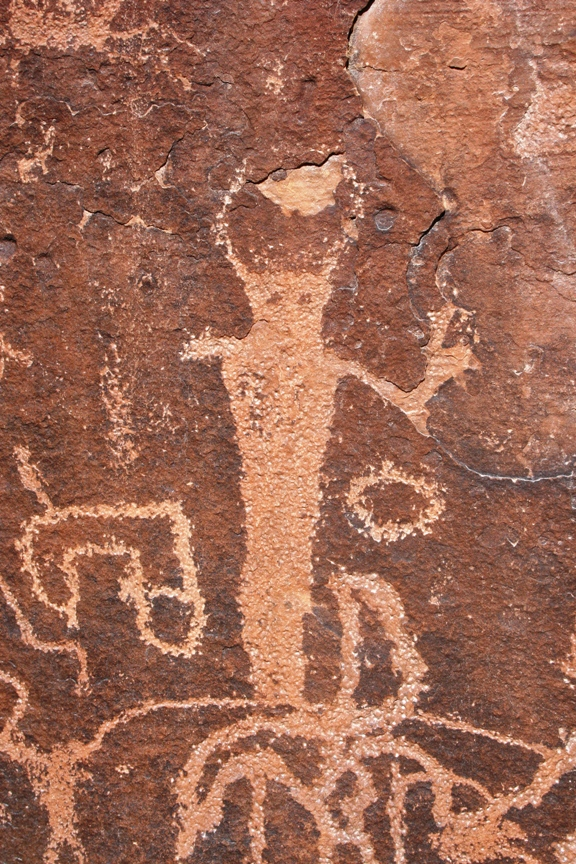
Detail of a Barrier Canyon Style Figure

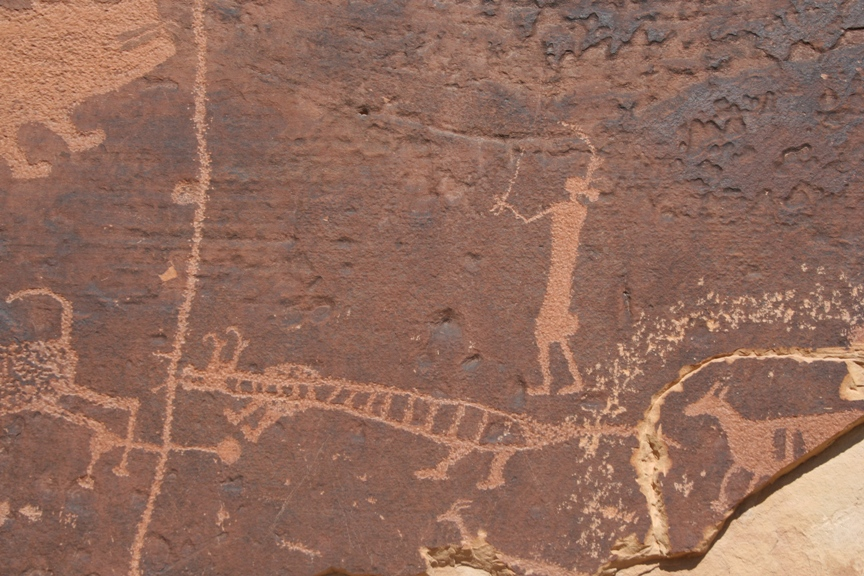
Detail

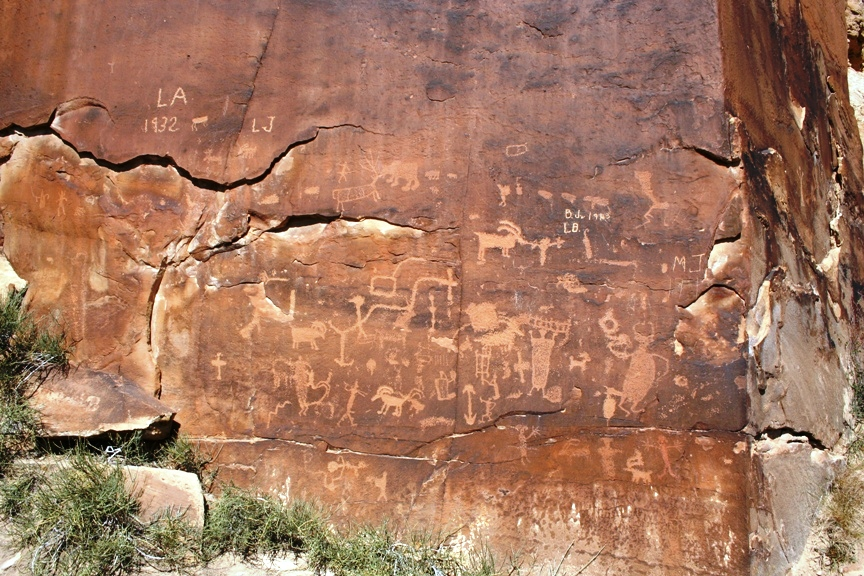
Additional panel slightly to the south of the main one

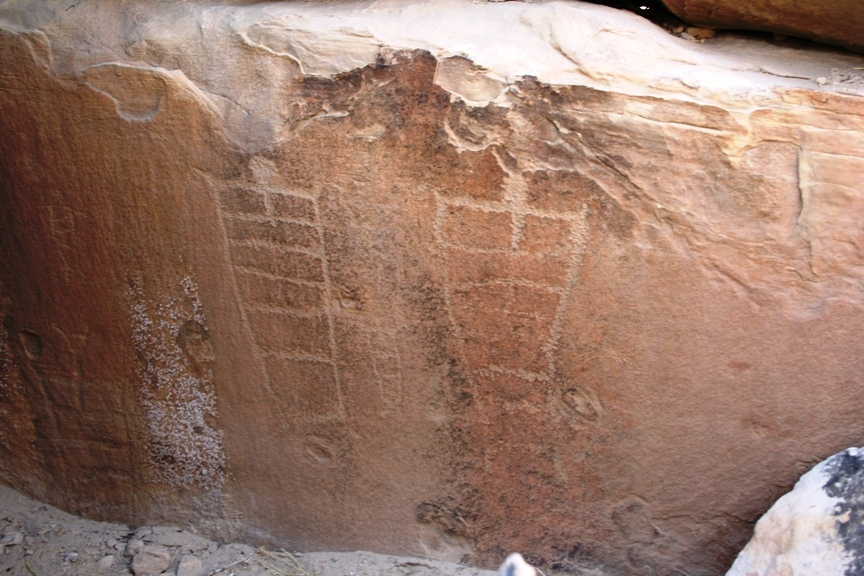
Rock art inside a rockfall cave near the main panel
