= Buckhorn Draw Pictograph Panel =

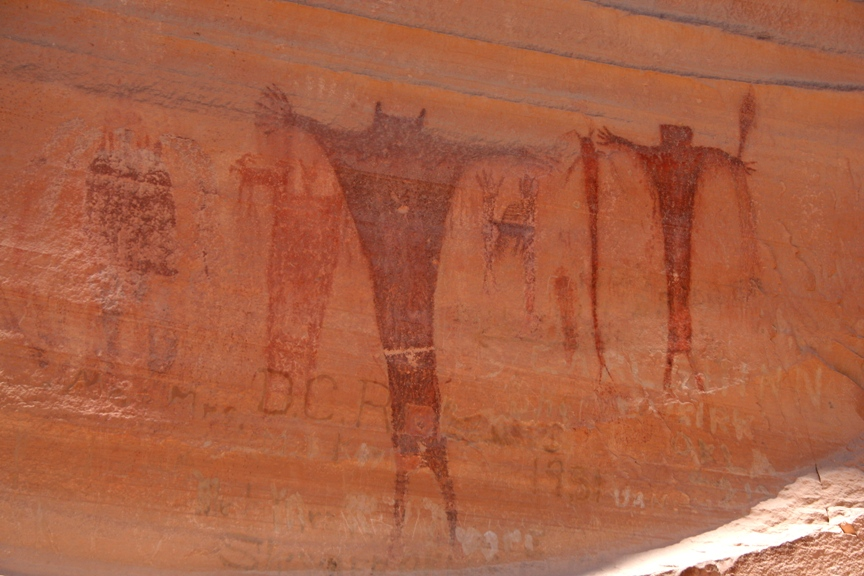

- Location within the United States
- Location: Emery County, Utah, USA
- Nearest city: Castle Dale
- Coordinates: 39°07′25″N 110°41′37″W
- Governing body: Bureau of Land Management

The Buckhorn Draw Pictograph Panel is an example of rock art, located in Buckhorn Draw in the San Rafael Swell in central Utah, approximately four miles north of the San Rafael campground and bridge.

Primarily a Barrier Canyon Style panel, there are a few later petroglyphs of Fremont culture origin as well. In many cases the Fremont painted figures on top of the older Barrier Canyon ones.

The route up Buckhorn Draw was part of the Old Spanish Trail. As a result of the relatively large number of people passing by, the panel was repeatedly vandalized and marked with graffiti over the years. In 1996 the State of Utah and Emery County restored the panel as part of the state's centennial celebration.

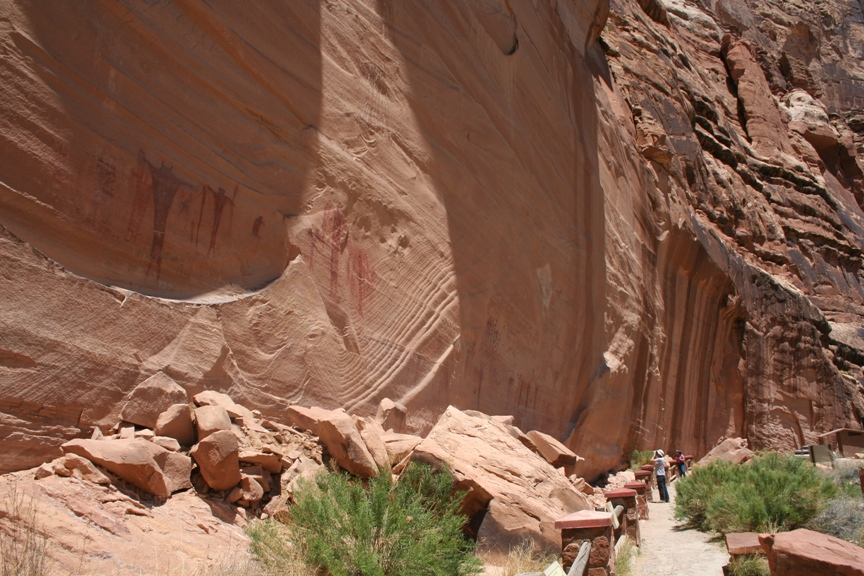
Panorama

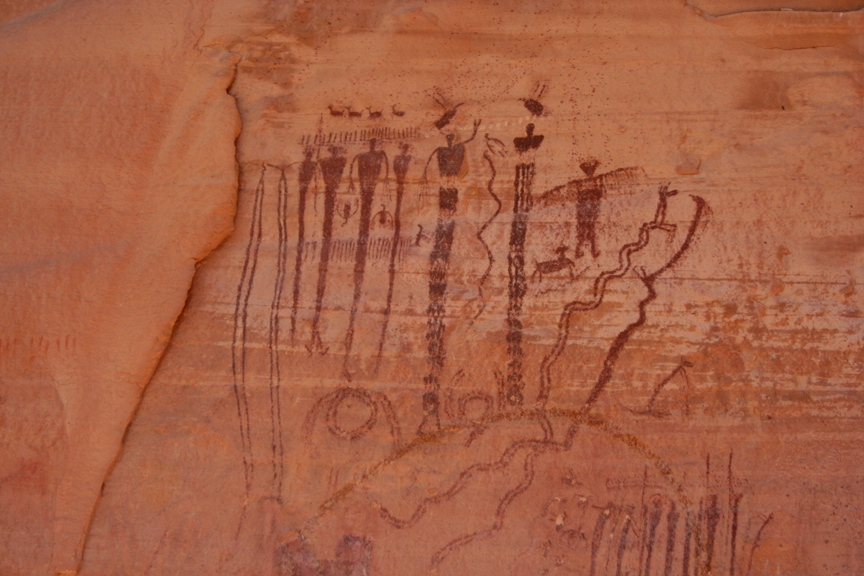
Detail

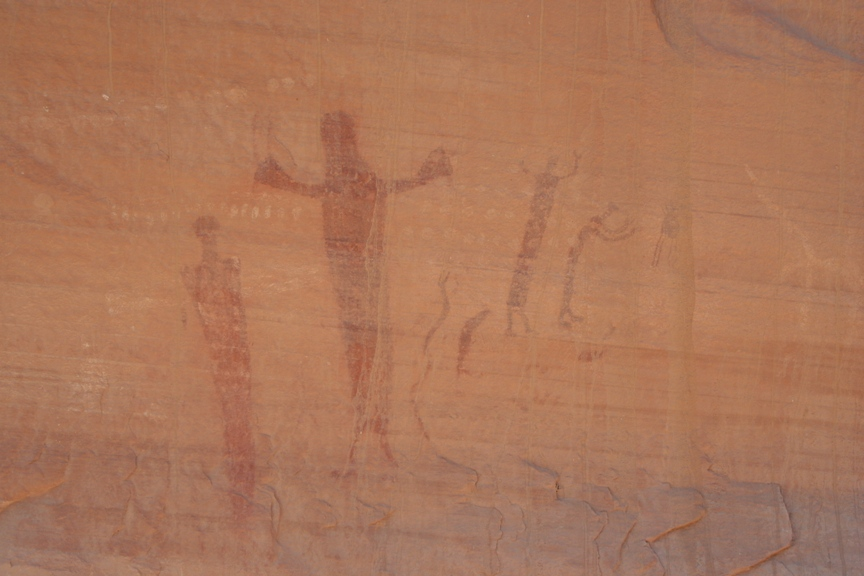
Detail

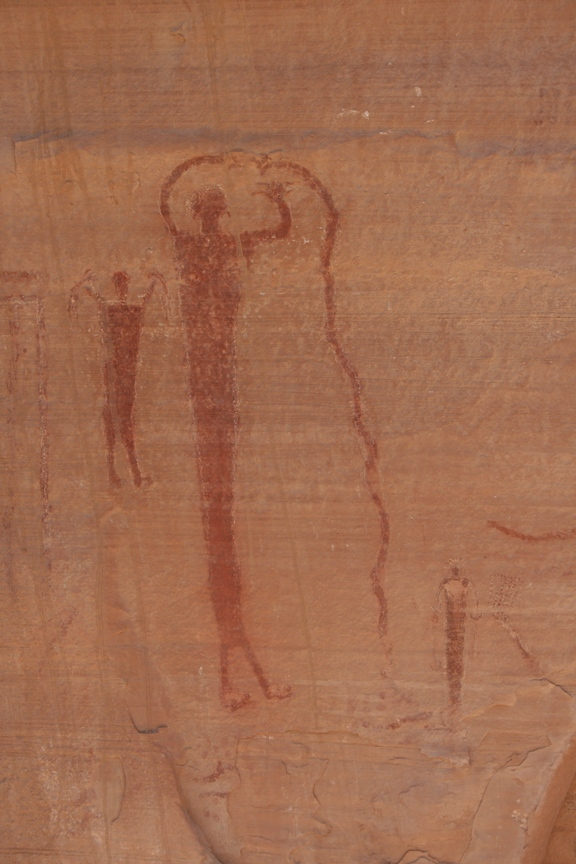
Detail

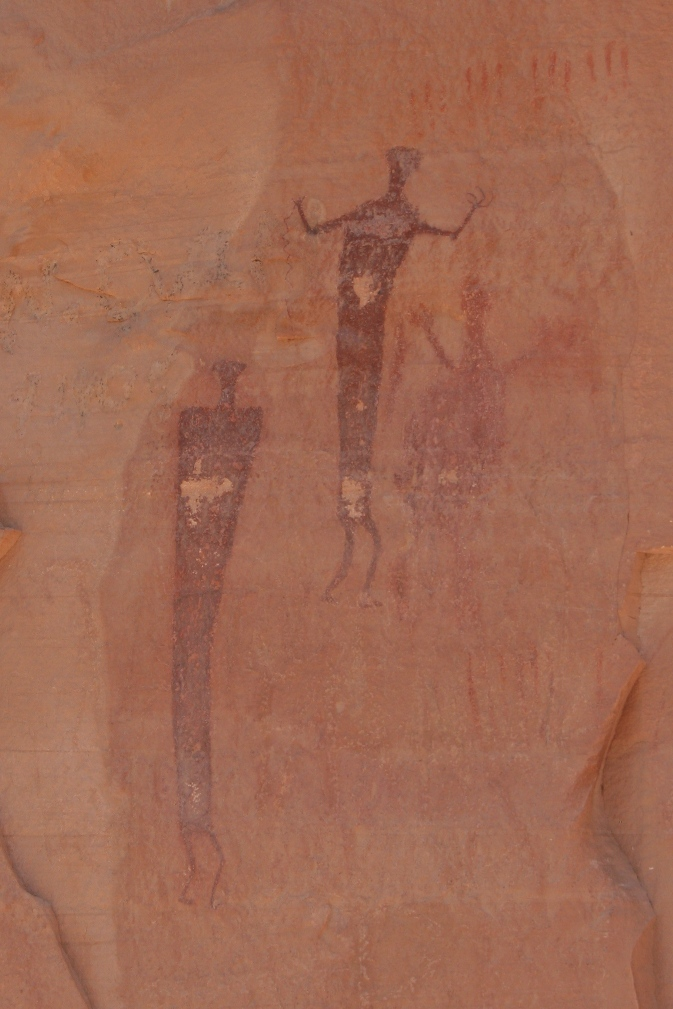
Detail

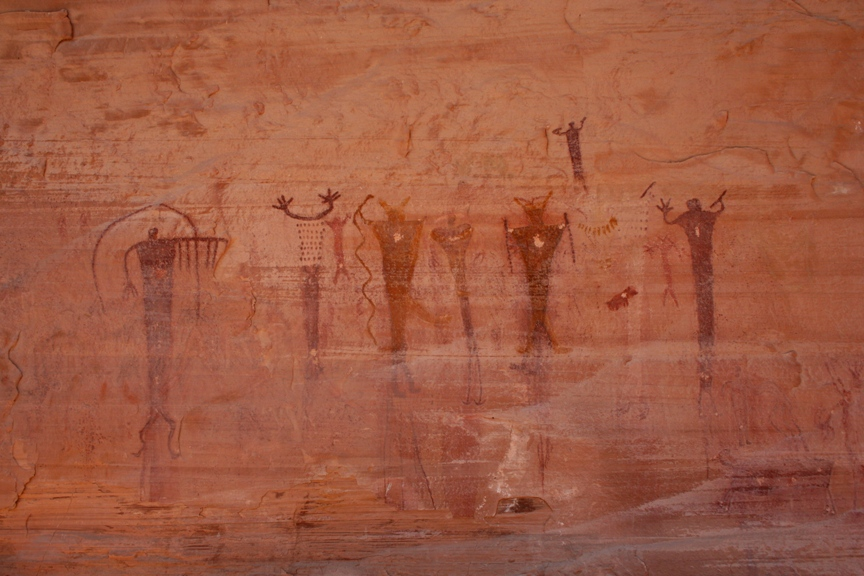
Detail

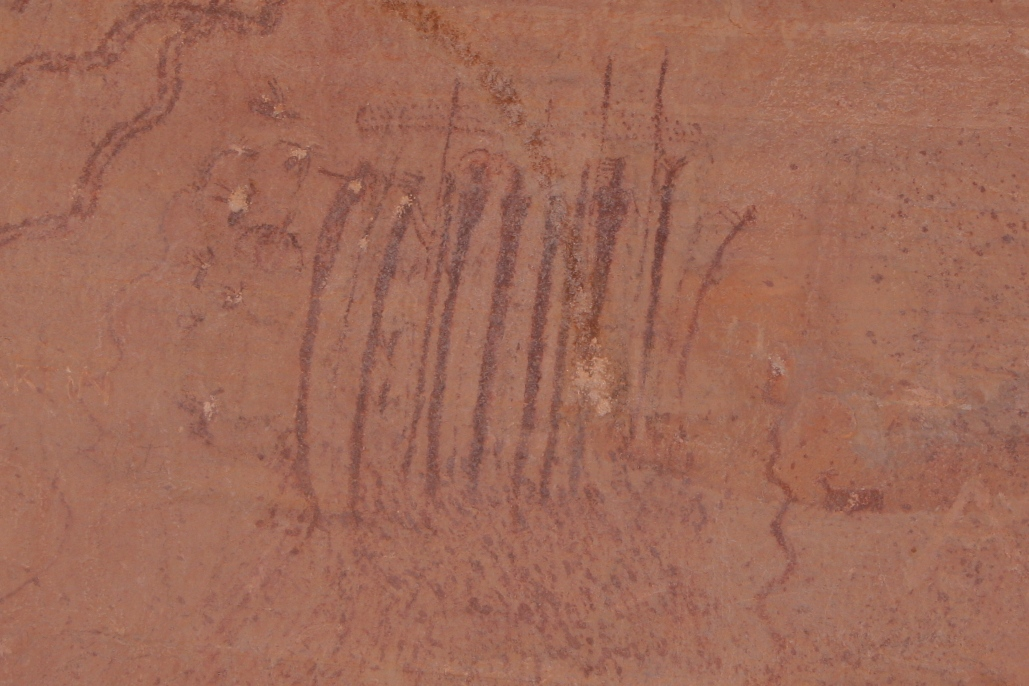
Detail

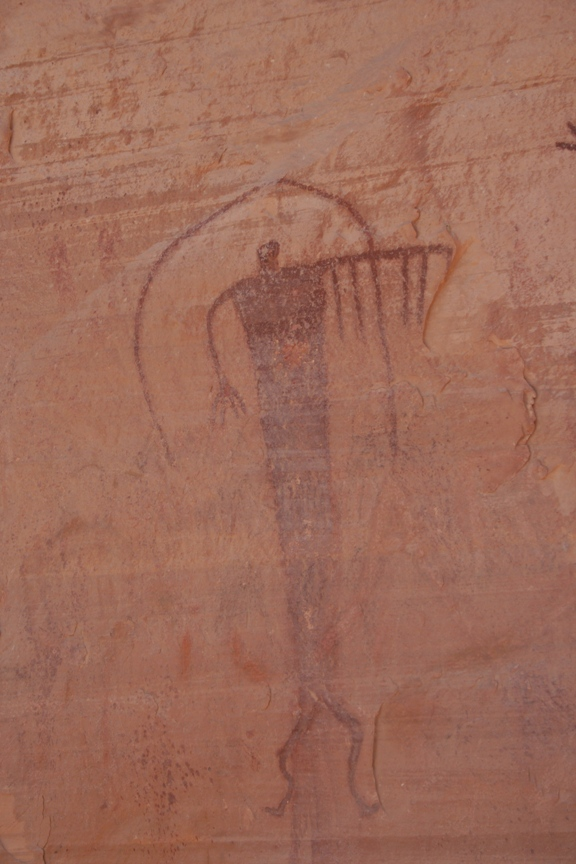
Detail

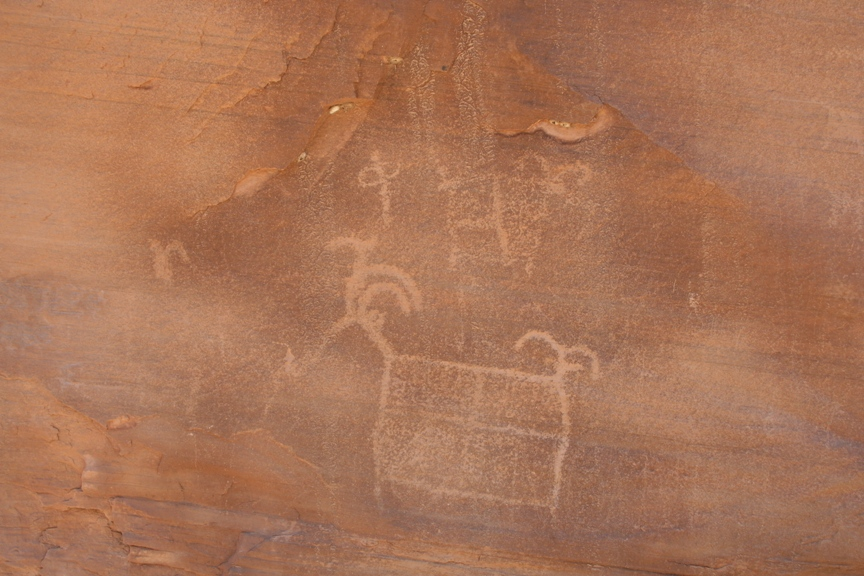
Detail of a Fremont culture petroglyph

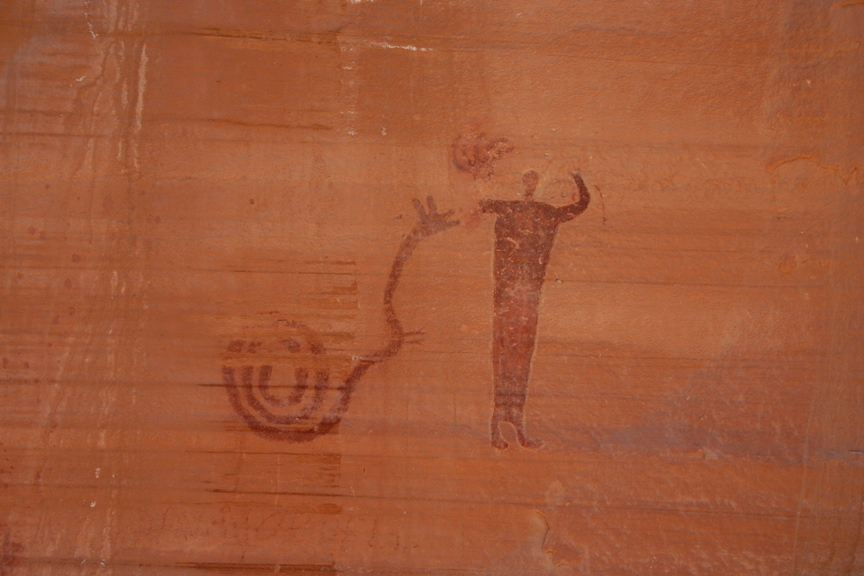
Detail

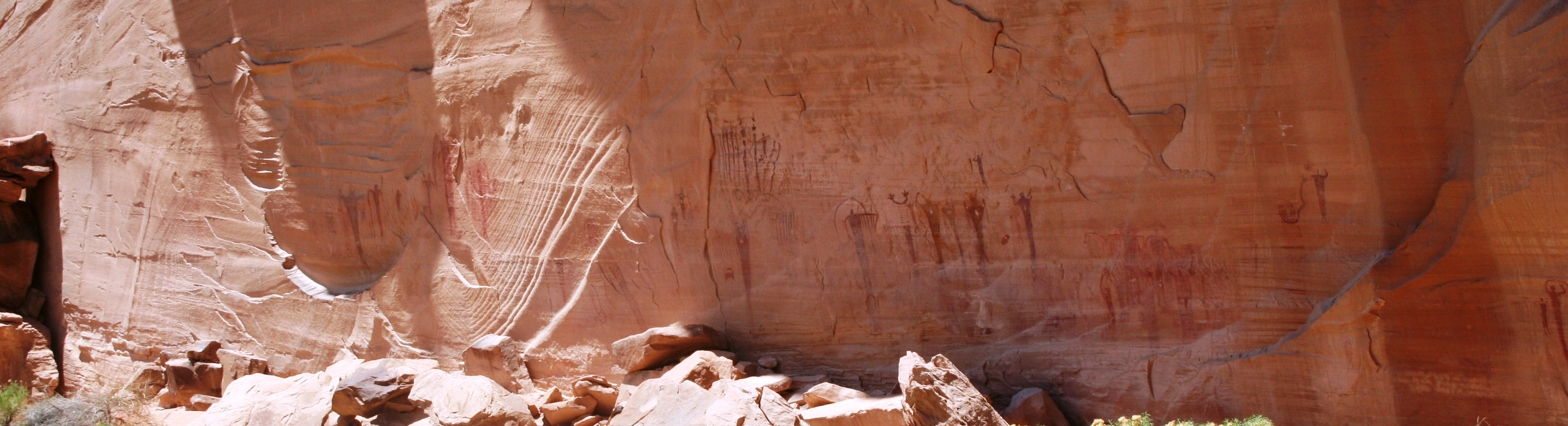
Detail
