= Connellsville, Utah =

- Ghost town
- Location within Utah Location within the United States
- Coordinates: 39°36′54″N 111°13′14″W
- Country: United States
- State: Utah
- County: Emery
- Established: 1874
- Abandoned: 1878
- Named for: Connellsville, Pennsylvania

Connellsville is a ghost town located high in the mountains of Coal Canyon, near the head of Huntington Canyon in the northwestern corner of Emery County, Utah, United States. A coal mining and coke manufacturing center, Connellsville was the first settlement in what is now Emery County, inhabited from 1874 to 1878. The town now lies beneath the waters of Electric Lake.

== History ==
In May 1874, the Fairview Coal Mining and Coke Company began mining in Coal Canyon to meet the demand for coke by Salt Lake City-area smelters. The company town built in the mining area was named Connellsville for the large coking center of Connellsville, Pennsylvania, but its population was small, only a few dozen miners and coke-oven workers. This was the first commercial coal mining operation in the Wasatch Plateau, pre-dating the coal mining boomtowns of Carbon County. The Connellsville coal made poor coke, however, and transportation facilities were lacking. By 1878 the project was deemed a failure, and the town was abandoned. Most of the miners moved over the mountain to Winter Quarters.

After the closure of Connellsville, its coal was mined only occasionally, to meet residential heating needs in the Sanpete Valley. Several remnants of the ghost town, including cabins and coke ovens, still stood until the construction of the Electric Lake reservoir in 1973. Before the water covered Connellsville, Utah Power funded an archaeological survey of the area and reconstructed one of the coke ovens on a new site above the water line. The rest of the ghost town is underwater.
