= Emery County, Utah =

County in Utah, United States

- County
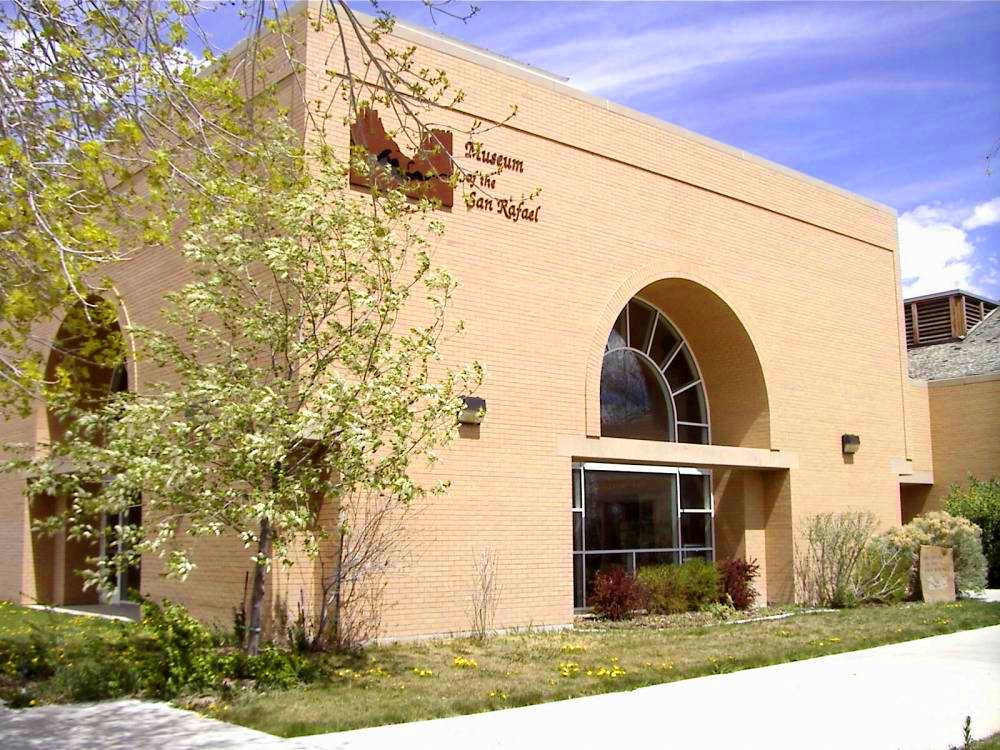
- Museum of the San Rafael Swell, in Castle Dale

- Seal

- Location within the U.S. state of Utah
- Coordinates: 38.99°N 110.69°W
- Country: United States
- State: Utah
- Founded: February 12, 1880
- Named for: George W. Emery
- Seat: Castle Dale
- Largest city: Huntington

Area
  - Total: 4,472 sq mi (11,580 km^{2})
  - Land: 4,462 sq mi (11,560 km^{2})
  - Water: 9.5 sq mi (25 km^{2}) 0.2%

Population (2020)
  - Total: 9,825
  - Estimate (2025): 10,177 ▲
  - Density: 2.202/sq mi (0.8502/km^{2})
- Time zone: UTC−7 (Mountain)
  - Summer (DST): UTC−6 (MDT)
- Congressional district: 3rd
- Website: emery.utah.gov

Emery County is a county in east-central Utah, United States. As of the 2020 United States census, the population was 9,825. Its county seat is Castle Dale, and the largest city is Huntington. Emery County was named after George W. Emery, the Utah Territory governor.

== History ==
=== Prehistory ===
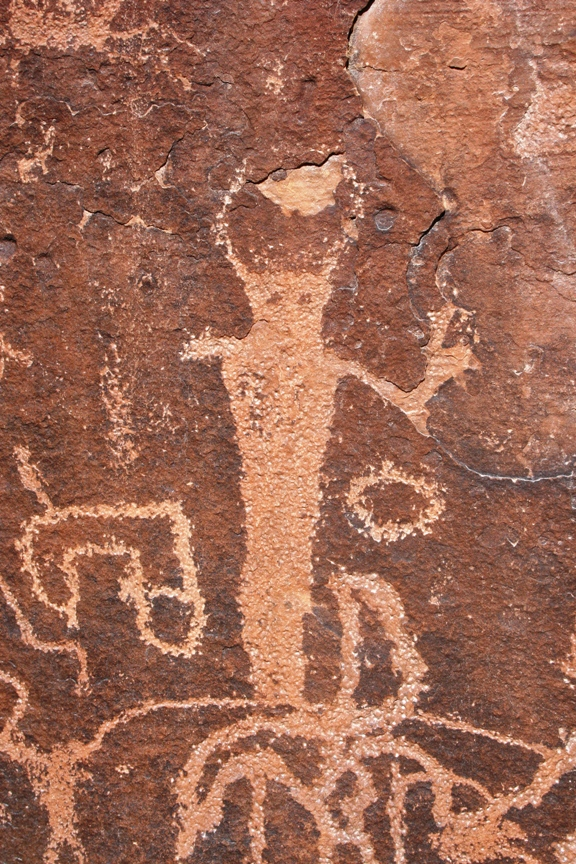
Barrier Canyon Style rock art found in Emery County

Occupation of the San Rafael region dates back thousands of years to include people of the Desert Archaic Culture who were followed by those of the Fremont culture who inhabited present-day Emery County through the sixth through thirteenth centuries AD. Evidence of these civilizations is extant in numerous pictograph and petroglyph panels, such as those in Temple Mountain Wash, Muddy Creek, Ferron Box, Black Dragon Canyon, and Buckhorn Wash - all sites listed in the National Register of Historic Places. Indigenous Ute people also occupied sites in Castle Valley.

=== Old Spanish Trail ===
The first non-indigenous persons to view Castle Valley were Spanish Traders and Explorers. The first of record was Silvestre Vélez de Escalante; in 1776, he crossed northern Utah through the Uintah Basin. Spanish traders and explorers soon found a more southerly route, and their path became known as the Old Spanish Trail. It began at Santa Fe, to Durango, Colorado, crossed the Colorado River (then known as Grand River) near present-day Moab, then to the Green River-crossing where Green River is now located, thence westerly to Cedar Mountain. It went on the South side of Cedar Mountain, across Buckhorn Flat, passed the Red Seeps to Huntington Creek, crossing about a mile below where the present bridge crosses; thence to Cottonwood Creek. It crossed the Ferron Creek where Molen now stands. It passed through the Rochester Flats about one mile (1.6 km) east of present-day Moore and crossed the Muddy Creek about two miles (3.2 km) due east of the present town of Emery.

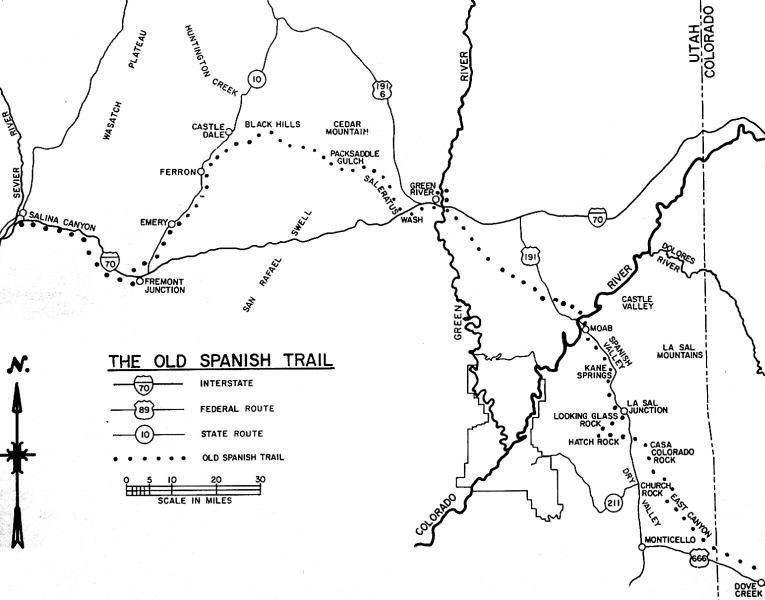
Route of the Old Spanish Trail within southeastern Utah.

It then went over Salina (Salt Creek) Canyon. It then turned south and went through Parowan, Mountain Meadows, Las Vegas Nevada, Barstow California, and to the coast. This Trail had to traverse Castle Valley to skirt the steep-walled canyons of the San Juan, Colorado, Green, Dirty Devil, and San Rafael Rivers.

Slavery was the principal trade between Santa Fe and the Utah region. The trading of Indian women and children to the Spanish, although illegal, was the purpose of the Spanish coming into the area to become Utah. The other use of the trail was to herd livestock, mostly horses, from California to Santa Fe. Since the slave trade was illegal, the traders kept neither records of their activities nor the extent of their travels and explorations. Travelers along the Old Spanish Trail gave Castle Valley its names, as the travelers marveled at the imposing rock formations.

=== Early explorers ===
The first Americans to come to Castle Valley were fur trappers, including the "lost trappers", James Workman and William Spencer, who had been separated from their trapping party by Comanche Indians and had wandered to the Moab crossing of the Colorado River hoping that they would find Santa Fe. They met a Spanish caravan of forty or fifty people going to California. They joined the caravan and traveled through Castle Valley in 1809 and went on to California. In 1830, William Wilfskill came to Castle Valley along the Spanish Trail. He and his party were fur trappers but found little in the area to keep them here.

Following the trappers in the late 1840s and early 1850s, government explorers came to the valley seeking usable overland routes across the continent. Kit Carson was the first of these famous men. He was looking for a direct route for the mail to be carried overland from St. Louis to California. Carson carried through Castle Valley to the nation the news of gold being found in the Sierra Nevada in 1848.

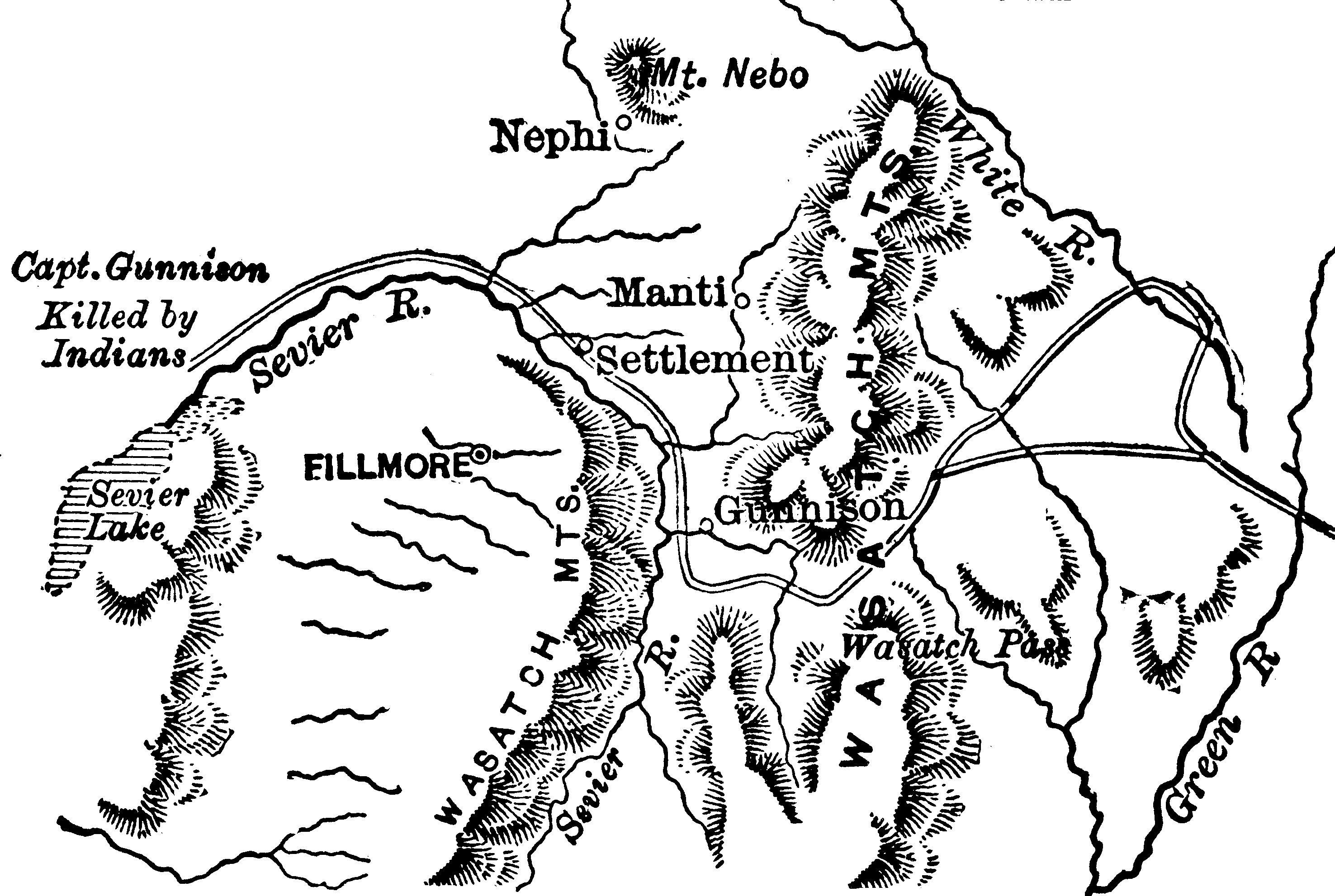
Gunnison's trail through Utah

In 1853 John W. Gunnison, an Army Topographical Engineer came through Castle Valley, plotting a railroad route. He was commissioned for this assignment by the US Secretary of War Jefferson Davis. He left detailed descriptions of his travels and carefully laid out his route through Castle Valley. Gunnison's route first met the Spanish Trail at the Green River crossing. He followed this trail for a short distance west of the Green River, but when the Spanish Trail entered a rugged rocky region (Sinbad Reef) he charted a route around this feature.

The third government explorer was John C. Fremont, in the winter of 1853–54. The cold weather heavily impacted his trip. They suffered from a lack of food and from the inhospitable landscape. There was no relief from their difficulties until they left Castle Valley and made their way to the small Mormon settlement of Parowan.

=== Arrival of pioneers ===
In 1875 livestock growers from Sanpete County brought cattle and sheep into Castle Valley to graze, and several recognized the settlement potential of the region. With a shortage of sufficient land and water in Sanpete County and a strong desire by LDS Church leaders to acquire unoccupied land in the region before non-Mormons did, young families began moving into Castle Valley in the fall of 1877 to homestead in the future sites of Huntington, Ferron, Castle Dale, and Orangeville.

In late August 1877, Brigham Young, president of the Church of Jesus Christ of Latter-day Saints (LDS Church), issued an order to the Sanpete LDS Stake president seeking "... at least fifty families [to] locate in Castle Valley this fall." The order led to the last Mormon colony settled under the direction of Brigham Young. One week later on August 29, Young, the Great Colonizer, died. During his 30 years as leader of the LDS Church, Young had overseen and directed the establishment of almost 400 towns and villages. The settlement of Emery County was his last.

Soon after the issuance of Young's order, several bands of settlers moved out from the Sanpete region and headed for Castle Valley (Emery County). They settled along Huntington Creek, Cottonwood Creek, and Ferron Creek. The following spring (1878), several more families arrived. In the spring of 1878, Elias Cox and Charles Hollingshead set up a sawmill in Huntington Canyon to support the colony. On Ferron Creek, settlers plowed lands and began the construction of a ditch for irrigation. Most early settlers in Castle Valley claimed easily watered bottom lands along the creeks and rivers, and by 1879, most of the best lands had been taken up.

The Utah Territorial Legislature created Emery County on February 12, 1880. The description included the future Carbon County area. It was named for George W. Emery, the Utah Territory governor whose term was ending as the act was being debated. The 1880 census showed 556 people and 84 farms in Emery County, but this figure is likely short as many prominent settlers were inadvertently left off the county rolls. By 1890, the population of Emery County had risen to 2,866. Between 1880 and 1900, many significant canals were constructed, including the Huntington Canal (1884), Emery Canal (1885), Cleveland Canal (1885), and the Wakefield Ditch (1880). Many of the early canals are still in service. The county boundaries were altered in 1880 and 1890. In 1894 the north portion of the county was partitioned off to create Carbon County. The county boundaries remained intact after that, except for a small adjustment in the city of Green River in 2003.

In the early 1880s, the Denver and Rio Grande Western Railroad contemplated possible routings through the Emery County region. Early plans to locate the railroad through the heart of Emery County were thwarted when the route over the Wasatch Range was too steep. The route was moved to the NE part of the county, bypassing most settlements. Most of the county thus missed on economic opportunities brought by the railroad, but Green River, on the east county border, quickly boomed after the rails arrived.

=== Twentieth century ===
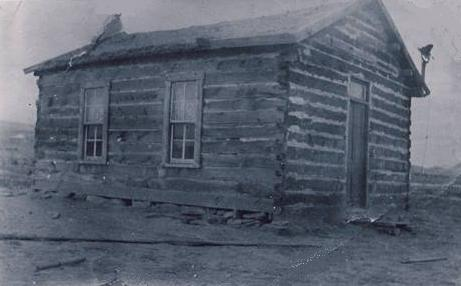
Moore, Utah school house circa 1912.

Emery County population passed 4,600 by 1900, with 450+ farms and 25,000 acres (100 km^{2}) under cultivation. Irrigation systems were being expanded to bring new lands into production, bringing problems that would plague the region for several decades. Water rights conflicts frequently arose, and water theft, known as "midnight irrigation," became common. Most disputes were settled by decree, but a few were contested by violence.

The underlying soils in Emery County consist of ancient seabeds which contain high levels of salts. Poor drainage and over-irrigation cause the salts to collect on the surface, rendering large land areas unsuitable for agriculture. The problem first appeared in the 1890s, and in 1903, a Department of Agriculture report stated that over 30% of the developed farmland in Emery County had been abandoned due to degradation.

With expanded irrigation development came expanded settlement as several new towns were established. In addition, the coal industry, which had consisted of small mines to cover local demand, had significantly expanded, with several large-scale operations starting in the county. The US entry into The Great War created a minor boom in Emery County as agricultural prices rose and manpower shortages caused wages at the mines to rise. Following the war, prices dropped significantly, leading to hard times throughout much of the 1920s. Things improved somewhat during the later years of the decade, but an even more significant collapse came with the onset of the Great Depression in the early 1930s. In addition, severe drought in 1931 and 1934 intensified the economic hardship in the county.

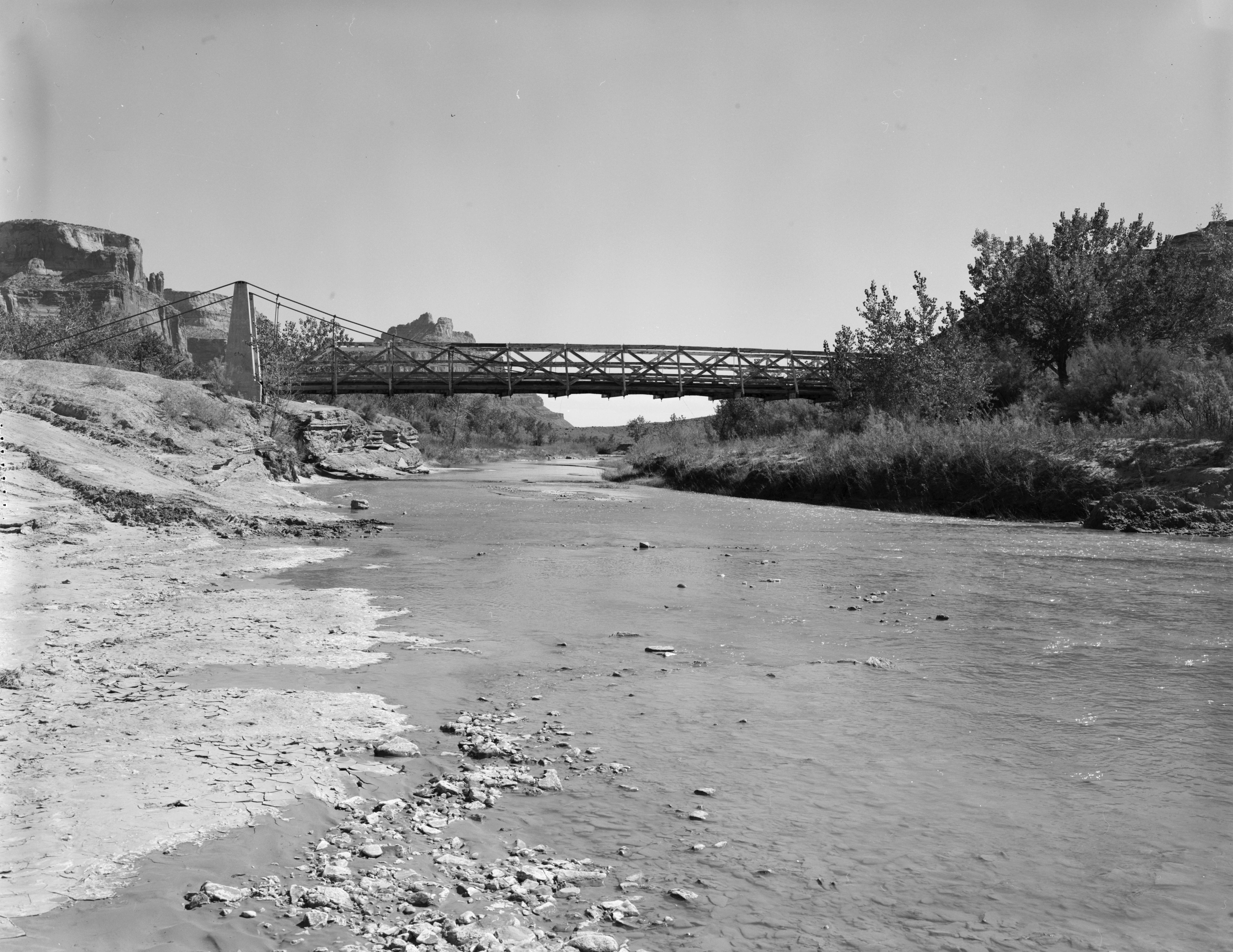
San Rafael Bridge in Emery County

The 1930s were difficult for Emery County residents. The county population dropped by 5% from 1920 to 1930, although it remained somewhat steady after that. Agricultural prices dropped 40% from their 1929 level, and coal production dropped by half. Water shortages and land degradation continued to be problems. In 1935, only 16,462 acres (66.62 km^{2}) out of 41,725 acres (168.86 km^{2}) produced crops.

The residents did benefit from several depression-relief programs, including the Civilian Conservation Corps (CCC), which established several CCC camps in the county. Company 959 established a camp in Joes Valley in May 1933. The camp moved several times in the following years before establishing a permanent camp near Ferron in 1935. A second camp was established at Castle Dale in 1935, and another camp was established at Green River in 1938. During its tenure in Emery County, the CCC built roads, bridges, and trails, as well as building ranger stations and other projects on public lands. Many enrollees settled in Emery County after their discharge from the Corps.

Following the end of World War II, Emery County veterans returned to find relative economic prosperity. County farm income in 1946 was double that of 1940, and the coal mines were operating at fairly high levels. During the post-war years, the county matured and modernized as modern water and sanitation systems were constructed, roads were improved, and many of the luxuries enjoyed by people in less rural areas, like telephones, reached Emery County. While many things in Emery County improved, some things did not. The agricultural sector still suffered from inconsistent water supplies and a lack of significant long-term water storage. And in the mid-1950s, the region again experienced near-drought conditions. It was during this period that a water reservoir in Joes Valley was completed.

Riding the crest of national economic growth during the 1970s, Emery County's population grew significantly as a result of the construction of large coal-fired power plants in Castle Dale and Huntington by Utah Power & Light Company (PacifiCorp) and the expansion of coal mines to fuel them.

=== Recent ===
On August 6, 2007, at 2:48 A.M., UtahAmerican Energy's Crandall Canyon Mine, 15 miles (24 kilometers) west north-west of Huntington collapsed, trapping 6 workers inside. The mine, located just off State Route 31, is about 34 miles (55 km) southeast of Fairview, and 140 mi (230 km) south of Salt Lake City (100 mi or 160 km). The workers were approximately 3.4 mi (5.5 km) from the mine entrance and 1,500 ft (460 m) underground. The collapse registered recorded seismic waves in magnitude 3.9 to 4.0, by seismograph stations of the University of Utah. Emery County, the state's No. 2 coal-producing county, was also the site of a fire that killed 27 people in the Wilberg Mine in December 1984.

== Geography ==
The Green River flows southward along the east side of the county. The Price River flows southeastward through the northeastern corner of the county to its discharge point into the Green on the county's eastern border. The San Rafael River rises in the northwestern part of the county and cuts its way across the county's central areas before discharging into the Green, several miles south of the city of Green River. The county terrain is rough flat areas broken by mountain ranges and ridges and carved by water erosion, generally sloping to the south and east. The county's highest point is 10,743 ft (3,274 m) ASL, in the Central Utah Plateaus on the county's main north border. The county has a total area of 4,472 square miles (11,580 km^{2}), of which 4,462 square miles (11,560 km^{2}) is land and 9.5 square miles (25 km^{2}) (0.2%) is water. The Wasatch Plateau, a mountainous area, sits along the western boundary. The main population of the county lives along the base of these mountains. The San Rafael Swell occupies most of the area to the east.

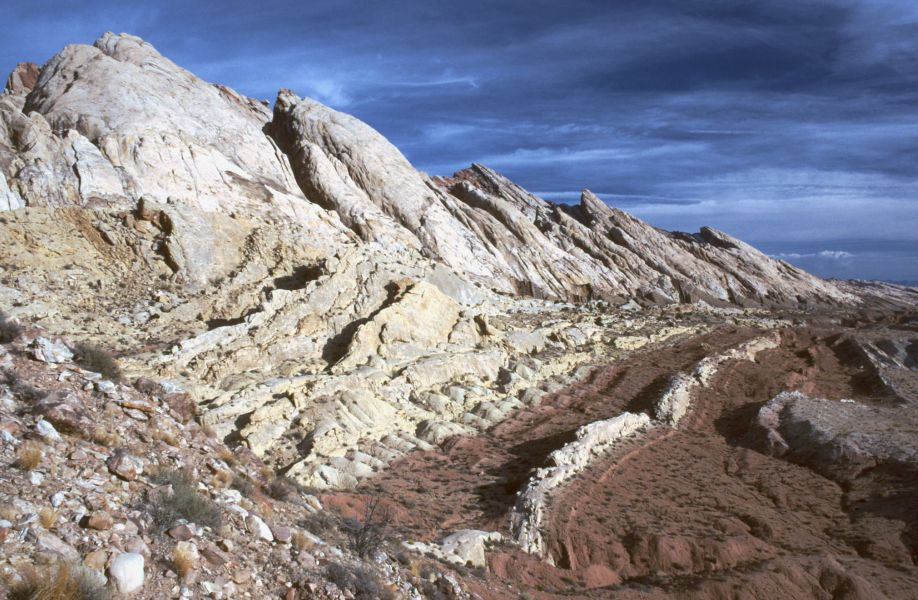
The San Rafael Reef

The western side of the county is the most populated and contains numerous small communities residing in an agricultural valley that roughly parallels the Manti National Forest to the west. Streams originate in the Wasatch Plateau in the forest, and their headwaters are stored in several reservoirs. Agricultural areas depend on these reservoirs and waterways for survival, and some farmland communities struggle with excess salinity. The east side of the county is dry with rough terrain. Green River, the largest community on this side of the county, is more closely tied to the communities and economy of Grand County. Emery County's maps show the importance of the forest lands to the local communities as there are few significant groundwater aquifers in the area.

Emery County contains three areas: the mountainous Wasatch Plateau to the west; Castle Valley, where the major settlements are located; and the desert of the San Rafael Swell, the San Rafael Reef, Cedar Mountain, and the remote stretches on the east.

The San Rafael River, the lifeblood of the county, originates in the Wasatch Plateau, where the headwaters are stored in several reservoirs for agricultural and industrial use. It flows into Castle Valley in three branches—Huntington Creek, Cottonwood Creek, and Ferron Creek—which unite to form the San Rafael River after they pass the communities and adjacent farmland. It then twists its way through the rock and desert to its junction with the Green River.

Geographical names feature Native American, Spanish and English influences. Two Ute Indian names: Wasatch, a gap in the mountains; Quitchupah, a place where animals fare poorly. Wasatch is the name of the plateau between the Sanpete Valley and the Castle Valley. Quitchupah is a small creek south of Emery. The Spanish name is still used in San Rafael, which means Saint Ralph. During Spanish times, the name Rafael was also given to the present Ferron Creek. In 1873, A.D. Ferron, the surveyor sent by Washington to perform cadastral surveys of eastern Utah, named this creek, but before this time, it was the Rafael. The Ute Indians called it the Cabulla, which refers to the small edible part of cactus pear. Huntington Creek was originally called San Marcus; Ute Indians called it Sivareeche, and the Spanish called it Mateo. The Indians called Castle Valley Tompin-con-tu or rock house land, which relates to the present Castle Valley. The Spanish named the valley St. Joseph's Valley.

=== Archaeology ===
Range Creek rises in Emery County and has recently been shown to have pristine remains of the Fremont culture. The State of Utah owns the site and is currently identifying the remains and developing a long-term conservation plan.

=== Major highways ===
- United States Interstate I-70
- United States US-191
- Utah State Highway UT-10
- Utah State Highway UT-24
- Utah State Highway UT-29
- Utah State Highway UT-31

=== Adjacent counties ===
- Carbon County - north
- Uintah County - northeast
- Grand County - east
- San Juan County - southeast
- Wayne County - south
- Sevier County - southwest
- Sanpete County - northwest

=== Protected areas ===
- Cedar Mountain Recreation Area
- Goblin Valley State Park
- Green River State Park
- Huntington State Park
- Manti-La Sal National Forest (part)
- Jurassic National Monument
- Millsite State Park

=== Lakes ===
- Aldys Hole
- Antelope Valley Number Three Reservoir
- Barewire Pond
- Baseball Pond
- Big Hole
- Big Hole Pond
- Big Pond
- Black Dragon Reservoir
- Blue Flat Reservoir
- Blue Pond
- Broken Pond
- Buckhorn Reservoir
- Buckmaster Reservoir
- C C C Pond
- Canyon Pond
- Cat Pond
- Chris Pond
- Cinderella Reservoir
- Cistern Tanks
- Cleveland Reservoir
- Cloyds Pond
- Clyde and Neils Pond
- Cow Flat Reservoir
- Cow Tanks
- Desert Lake
- Desert Reservoir Number 2
- Dinner Pond
- Diversion Hollow Debris Basin Reservoir
- Dog Hollow Reservoir
- Dog Ponds
- Drought Relief Reservoir
- Dry Pond
- Dry X Reservoir
- Dugway Reservoir
- Dutch Flat Reservoir
- Electric Lake
- Emery Plant Reservoir
- Farnsworth Tanks
- Forked Post Pond
- Goodwater Reservoir
- Greasewood Tank
- Guymon Pond
- Hadden Pit
- Hadden Reservoir
- Horse Bench Reservoir
- Horse Heaven Reservoir
- Huntington Lake
- Huntington Reservoir
- Hyde Draw Reservoir
- Indian Hollow Debris Basin Reservoir
- J J Reservoir
- Jim Wilson Reservoir
- Job Corps Pond
- Joes Holes
- Joes Valley Reservoir
- Johansen Pond
- Jorgensen Pond
- Kiahtipes Reservoir
- Kirby Pond
- Lews Hole
- Little Blue Pond
- Little Holes
- Lone Tree Reservoir
- Long Point Number 3 Reservoir
- Lynns Pond
- Merrials Pond
- Midway Reservoir
- Miller Flat Reservoir (partially)
- Millsite Reservoir
- Molen Tanks
- Moonshine Waterhole
- Mormon Tanks
- Mounds Reservoir
- Mussentuchit Reservoir
- Ninemile Reservoir
- Olsen Reservoir
- Orsons Pond
- Oscars Pond
- Petes Hole
- Pilling Pond
- Potters Ponds
- Rattlesnake Reservoir
- Red Point Reservoir
- Reid Neilson Reservoir
- Road End Reservoir
- Road Hollow Reservoir
- Rochester Reservoir
- Rock Reservoir
- Round Knoll Pond
- Russel Pond
- Saleratus Reservoir
- Sand Bench Reservoir
- Sand Pond
- Saucer Basin Reservoir
- Short Canyon Reservoir
- Sids Holes
- Sids Reservoir
- Sinkhole Reservoir
- Slaughter Slopes Reservoir
- Smith Pond
- Snow Lake
- South Ferron Reservoir
- South Sand Reservoir
- Southeast Mounds Reservoir
- State Pond
- Straight Hollow North Debris Basin Reservoir
- Straight Hollow South Debris Basin Reservoir
- Summit Pond
- Swazy Hole
- The Big Pond
- Three Coves Reservoir
- Trail Reservoir
- Twin Ponds
- Wedge Pond Number 1
- Wedge Pond Number 2
- Wedge Pond Number 4
- West Clawson Reservoir
- Wests Reservoir
- Woodpile Pond
- Wrigley Springs Reservoir (partially)
- Zwahlen Wash Debris Basin Reservoir

== Demographics ==
Historical population
Census	Pop.	Note	%±
1880	556		—
1890	5,076		812.9%
1900	4,657		−8.3%
1910	6,750		44.9%
1920	7,411		9.8%
1930	7,042		−5.0%
1940	7,072		0.4%
1950	6,304		−10.9%
1960	5,546		−12.0%
1970	5,137		−7.4%
1980	11,451		122.9%
1990	10,332		−9.8%
2000	10,860		5.1%
2010	10,976		1.1%
2020	9,825		−10.5%
2025 (est.)	10,177	▲	3.6%
US Decennial Census; 1790–1960 1900–1990; 1990–2000 2010 2020

=== 2020 census ===
According to the 2020 United States census and 2020 American Community Survey, there were 9,825 people in Emery County with a population density of 2.2 people per square mile (0.9/km^{2}). Among non-Hispanic or Latino people, the racial makeup was 8,811 (89.7%) White, 2 (0.0%) African American, 55 (0.6%) Native American, 36 (0.4%) Asian, 7 (0.1%) Pacific Islander, 16 (0.2%) from other races, and 193 (2.0%) from two or more races. 705 (7.2%) people were Hispanic or Latino.

Emery County, Utah – Racial and ethnic composition Note: the US Census treats Hispanic/Latino as an ethnic category. This table excludes Latinos from the racial categories and assigns them to a separate category. Hispanics/Latinos may be of any race.
Race / Ethnicity (NH = Non-Hispanic)	Pop 2000	Pop 2010	Pop 2020	% 2000	% 2010	% 2020
White alone (NH)	10,050	10,108	8,811	92.54%	92.09%	89.68%
Black or African American alone (NH)	19	25	2	0.17%	0.23%	0.02%
Native American or Alaska Native alone (NH)	63	67	55	0.58%	0.61%	0.56%
Asian alone (NH)	34	38	36	0.31%	0.35%	0.37%
Pacific Islander alone (NH)	10	9	7	0.09%	0.08%	0.07%
Other race alone (NH)	9	3	16	0.08%	0.03%	0.16%
Mixed race or Multiracial (NH)	107	72	193	0.99%	0.66%	1.96%
Hispanic or Latino (any race)	568	654	705	5.23%	5.96%	7.18%
Total	10,860	10,976	9,825	100.00%	100.00%	100.00%

There were 4,965 (50.53%) males and 4,860 (49.47%) females, and the population distribution by age was 2,869 (29.2%) under the age of 18, 5,187 (52.8%) from 18 to 64, and 1,769 (18.0%) who were at least 65 years old. The median age was 38.3 years.

There were 3,535 households in Emery County with an average size of 2.78 of which 2,625 (74.3%) were families and 910 (25.7%) were non-families. Among all families, 2,168 (61.3%) were married couples, 165 (4.7%) were male householders with no spouse, and 292 (8.3%) were female householders with no spouse. Among all non-families, 779 (22.0%) were a single person living alone and 131 (3.7%) were two or more people living together. 1,257 (35.6%) of all households had children under the age of 18. 2,833 (80.1%) of households were owner-occupied while 702 (19.9%) were renter-occupied.

The median income for an Emery County household was $57,772 and the median family income was $71,556, with a per-capita income of $24,372. The median income for males that were full-time employees was $62,786 and for females $33,143. 12.0% of the population and 7.8% of families were below the poverty line.

In terms of education attainment, out of the 6,350 people in Emery County 25 years or older, 358 (5.6%) had not completed high school, 1,909 (30.1%) had a high school diploma or equivalency, 3,081 (48.5%) had some college or associate degree, 687 (10.8%) had a bachelor's degree, and 315 (5.0%) had a graduate or professional degree.

=== Ancestry ===
As of 2015, the largest self-reported ancestry groups in Emery County, Utah are:

Largest ancestries (2015)	Percent
English	35.0%
German	14.8%
Danish	14.5%
Irish	10.6%
Scottish	6.6%
Swedish	5.5%
Dutch	5.0%
French (except Basque)	4.3%
Italian	3.9%
Welsh	3.8%
Norwegian	2.5%
Swiss	1.6%

== Economy ==
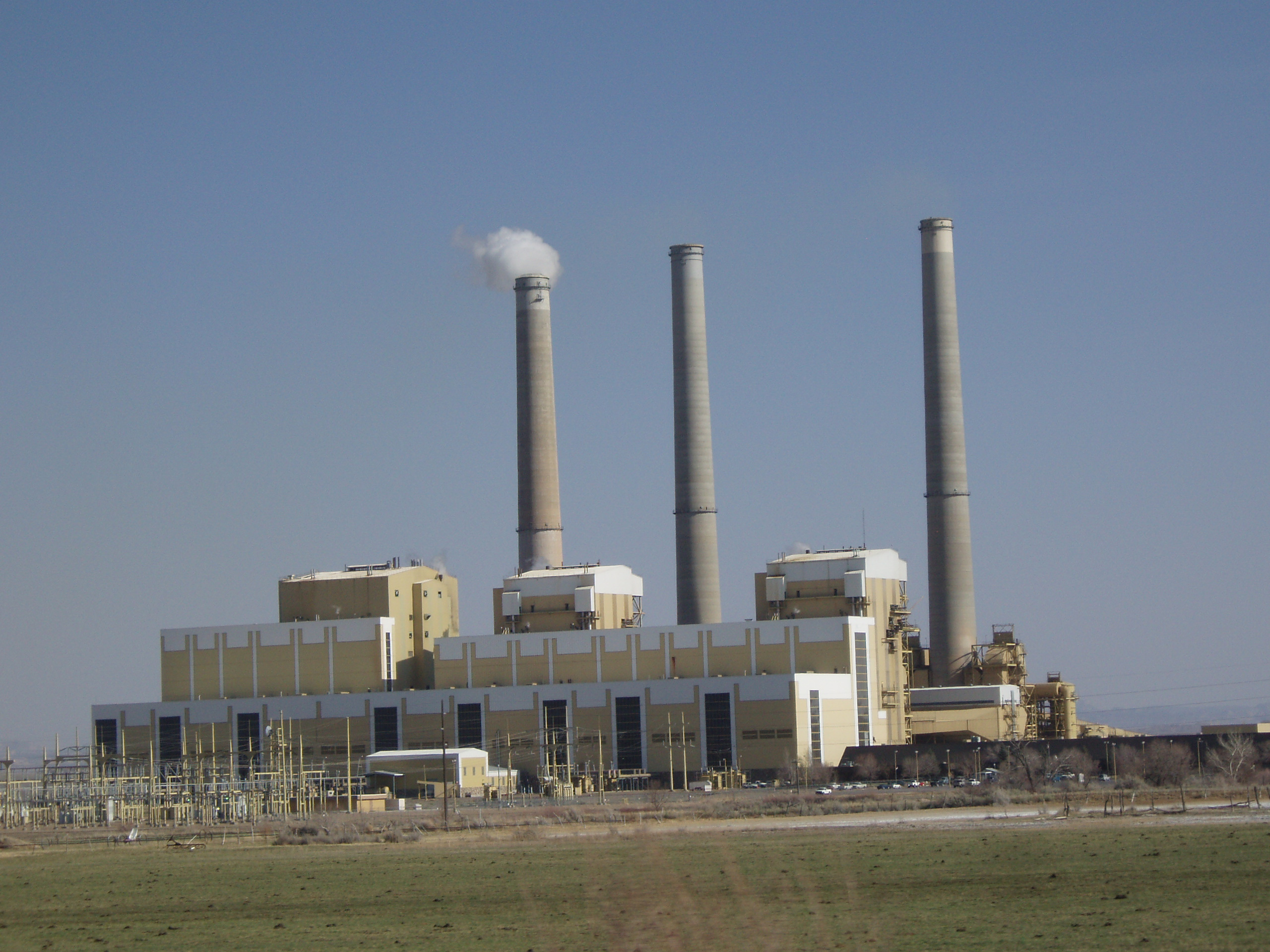
Pacificorp's Hunter Plant near Castle Dale

Livestock and farming were the mainstays of Emery County's economy for much of its history. The opening of large coal mines and the construction of large power plants in Castle Dale and Huntington in the 1970s changed the economy, and the population grew sharply. High wages in this sector initially created high average incomes, but depressed markets for coal and coalbed methane, along with improvements in mining technology, have slowed or postponed this sector for some time.

As a result, unemployment has remained higher than that of the State since 1990. The County still contains extensive natural resources that could be tapped, but the jobs produced from new mining activity may be at a similar level as those replaced by technology.

A proposed nuclear power plant, the Blue Castle Project, is set to begin construction near Green River in 2023.

== Education ==
Emery County School District operates public schools in the county.

- Emery High School
- Green River High School
- Canyon View Middle School
- San Rafael Middle School
- Ferron Elementary
- Cleveland Elementary
- Huntington Elementary
- Cottonwood Elementary
- Book Cliff Elementary
- Castle Dale Elementary

== Media ==
- The Castle Valley Review (Monthly)
- Emery County Progress (Weekly)

== Transportation ==
=== Airports ===
- Green River Municipal Airport (U34) = Green River
- Huntington Municipal Airport (69V) - Huntington

== Events ==
- Cleveland Days
- Elmo Horse and Buggy Days
- Emery (town) Days
- Emery County Fair
- Ferron Peach Days
- Green River Melon Days
- Huntington Heritage Days
- San Rafael Swell Mountain Bike Festival
- Joe's Valley Bouldering Festival

=== Former Events ===
- Castle Valley Pageant (1978 -2018)

== Attractions ==
- Joe's Valley Reservoir
- San Rafael Reef
- San Rafael Swell
- Buckhorn Draw Pictograph Panel
- The Wedge
- Huntington Reservoir
- Cottonwood Canyon
- Goblin Valley State Park
- Rochester Rock Art Panel
- The historic Emery LDS Church

== Politics and government ==
Like most of Utah, Emery County is reliably Republican. In only one national election since 1964, the county selected the Democratic Party candidate.

State elected offices
Position	District	Name	Affiliation	First elected
Senate	27	David Hinkins	Republican	2008
House of Representatives	69	Christine Watkins	Republican	2016
House of Representatives	70	Carl Albrecht	Republican	2016
Board of Education	14	Mark Huntsman	Nonpartisan	2014

United States presidential election results for Emery County, Utah
Year	Republican		Democratic		Third party(ies)	
Year	No.	%	No.	%	No.	%
1896	231	19.00%	985	81.00%	0	0.00%
1900	666	45.34%	798	54.32%	5	0.34%
1904	905	56.67%	583	36.51%	109	6.83%
1908	1,097	54.74%	749	37.38%	158	7.88%
1912	760	37.04%	760	37.04%	532	25.93%
1916	896	37.40%	1,406	58.68%	94	3.92%
1920	1,285	53.59%	1,029	42.91%	84	3.50%
1924	979	42.98%	916	40.21%	383	16.81%
1928	1,317	57.06%	965	41.81%	26	1.13%
1932	1,112	39.04%	1,613	56.64%	123	4.32%
1936	938	32.69%	1,909	66.54%	22	0.77%
1940	1,006	34.46%	1,901	65.13%	12	0.41%
1944	974	40.55%	1,427	59.41%	1	0.04%
1948	1,147	42.91%	1,511	56.53%	15	0.56%
1952	1,552	56.79%	1,181	43.21%	0	0.00%
1956	1,679	64.04%	943	35.96%	0	0.00%
1960	1,283	50.89%	1,238	49.11%	0	0.00%
1964	1,103	43.48%	1,434	56.52%	0	0.00%
1968	1,223	50.89%	1,019	42.41%	161	6.70%
1972	1,666	65.33%	769	30.16%	115	4.51%
1976	1,717	47.13%	1,771	48.61%	155	4.25%
1980	3,076	67.18%	1,315	28.72%	188	4.11%
1984	3,081	69.41%	1,326	29.87%	32	0.72%
1988	2,322	56.03%	1,788	43.15%	34	0.82%
1992	1,643	36.43%	1,349	29.91%	1,518	33.66%
1996	2,033	49.32%	1,371	33.26%	718	17.42%
2000	3,243	73.74%	958	21.78%	197	4.48%
2004	3,781	80.83%	831	17.76%	66	1.41%
2008	3,358	75.02%	973	21.74%	145	3.24%
2012	3,777	84.90%	569	12.79%	103	2.32%
2016	3,425	79.37%	380	8.81%	510	11.82%
2020	4,207	86.47%	572	11.76%	86	1.77%
2024	4,341	86.63%	603	12.03%	67	1.34%

== Communities ==
Map of Emery County municipalities

=== Cities ===
- Castle Dale (county seat)
- Ferron
- Green River
- Huntington
- Orangeville

=== Towns ===
- Clawson
- Cleveland
- Elmo
- Emery

=== Unincorporated communities ===
- Hiawatha (part)
- Lawrence
- Molen
- Moore

=== Former communities ===
- Connellsville
- Desert Lake
- Mohrland
- Victor
- Wilsonville
- Woodside

== In popular culture ==
- The scenes for planet Vulcan in the 2009 film Star Trek were filmed near Green River.
- Scenes in which Tim Allen battles a giant rock monster called "Gorignak" in the 1999 film Galaxy Quest were filmed at Goblin Valley State Park.
- The music video for 2008 single, "Human", by The Killers, was filmed in Goblin Valley.

== Gallery ==
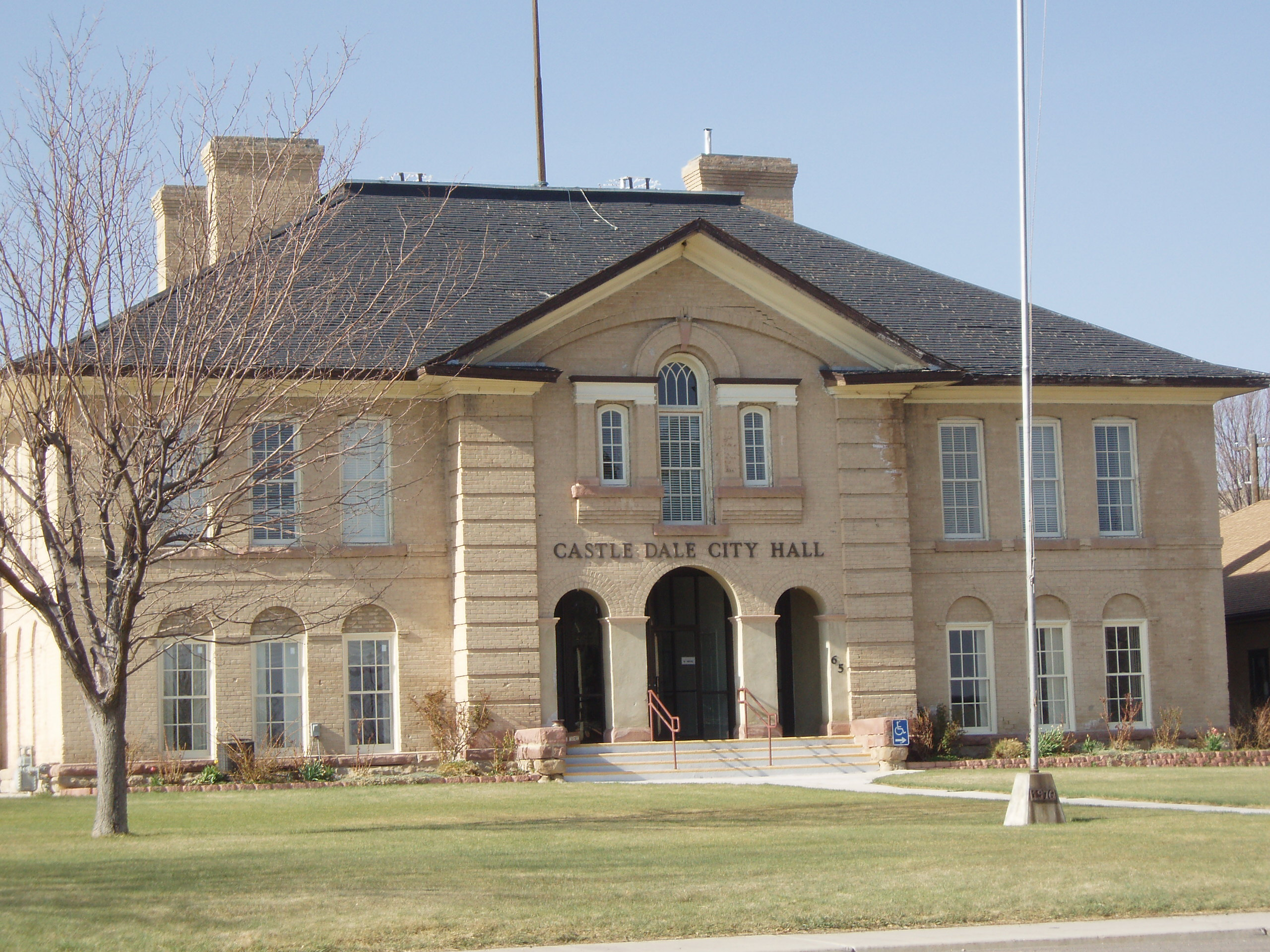
Castle Dale

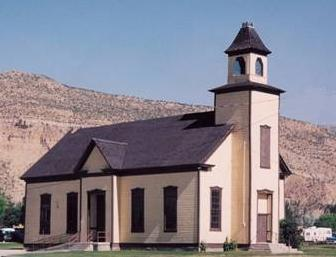
Emery

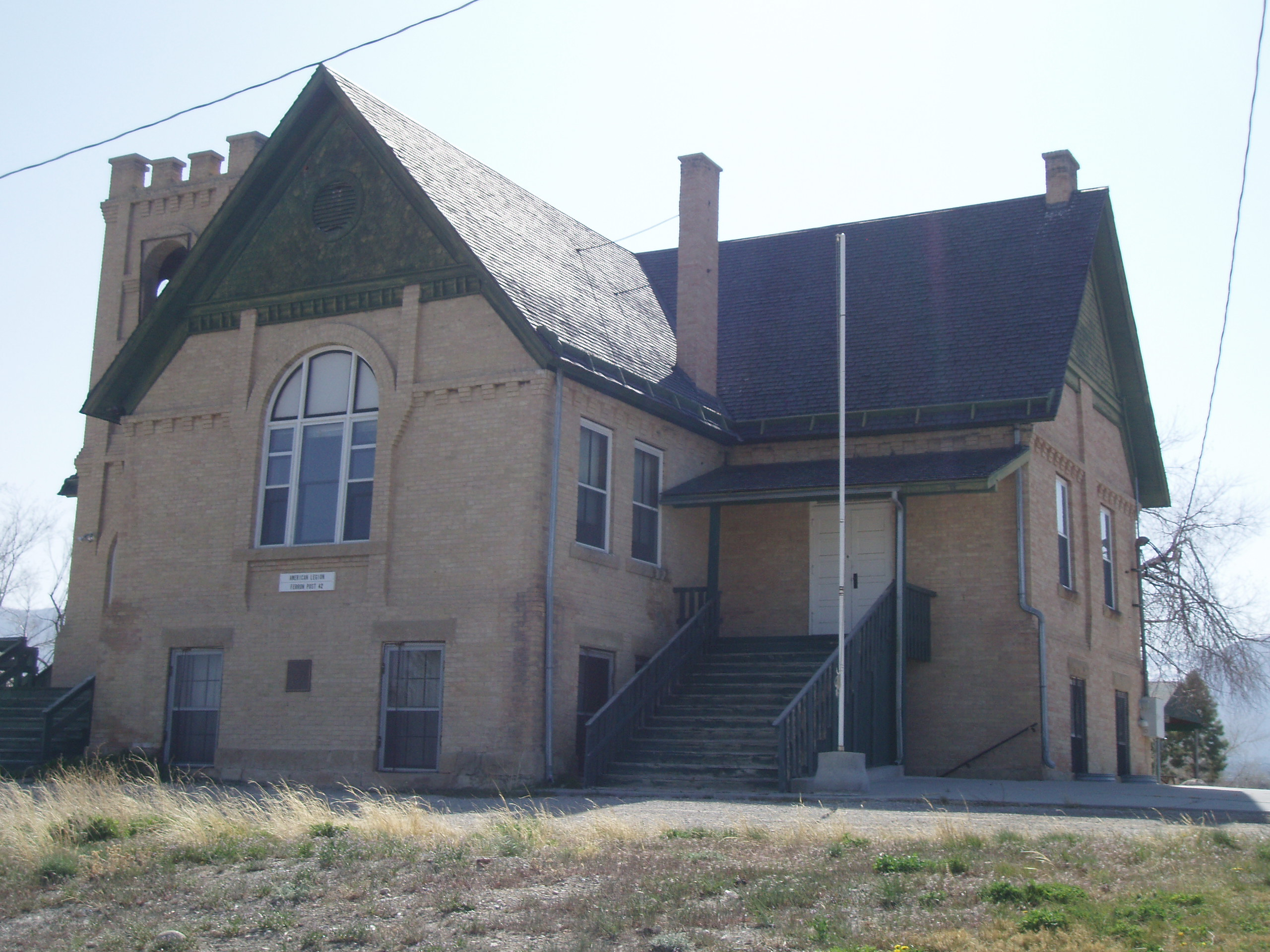
Ferron

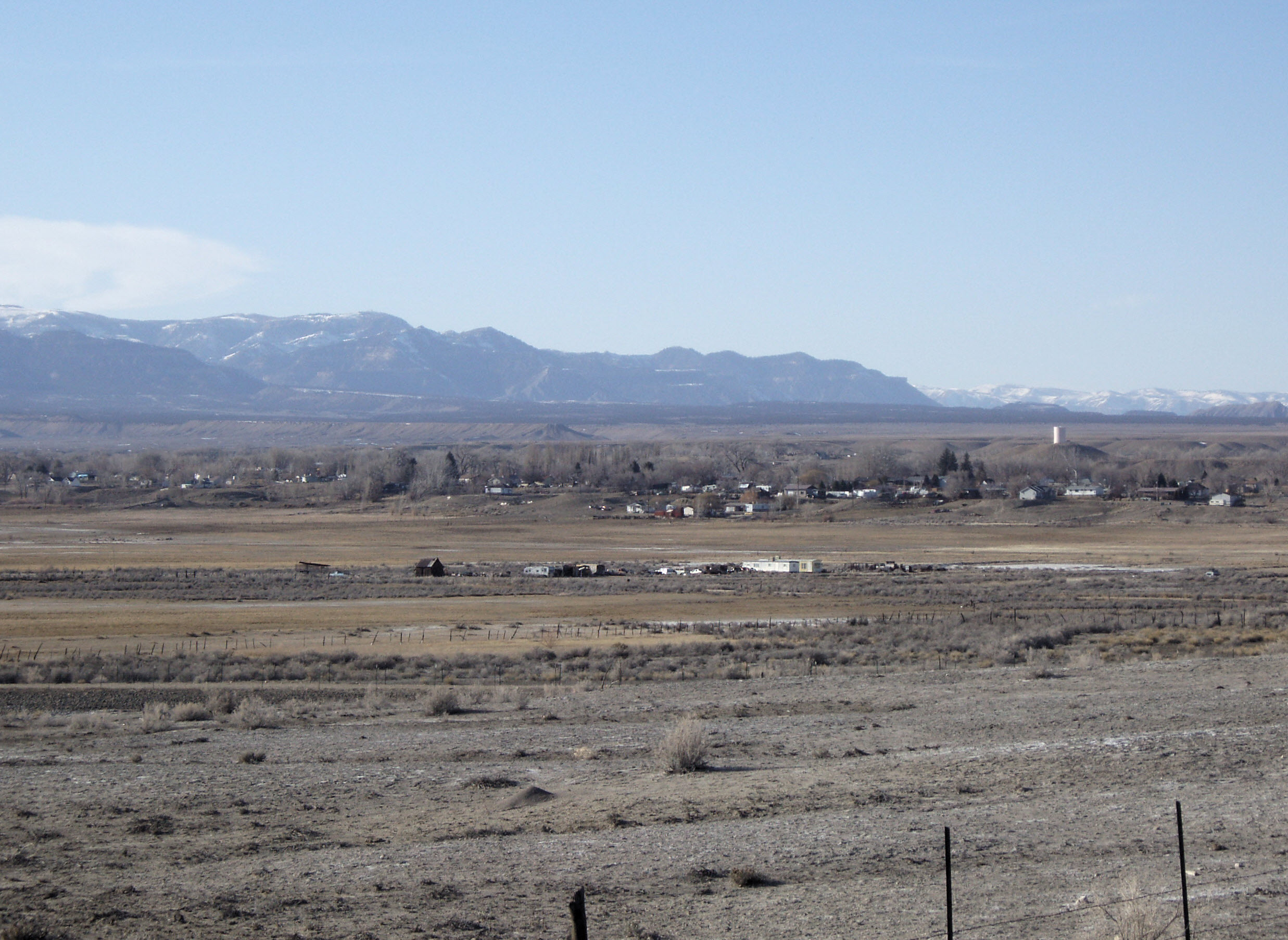
Cleveland

== See also ==
- List of counties in Utah
- Emery County Cabin
- National Register of Historic Places listings in Emery County, Utah
