= Molen, Utah =

Unincorporated community in the state of Utah, United States

- Unincorporated community
- Location within Utah Location within the United States
- Coordinates: 39°05′18″N 111°04′25″W
- Country: United States
- State: Utah
- County: Emery
- Settled: 1878
- Named for: Michael Molen
- Elevation: 5,764 ft (1,757 m)
- Time zone: UTC-7 (Mountain (MST))
  - Summer (DST): UTC-6 (MDT)
- ZIP code: 84523
- Area code: 435
- GNIS feature ID: 1437640

Molen is an unincorporated community in Emery County, Utah, United States.

== Description ==
Historical population
Census	Pop.	Note	%±
1890	134		—
1900	164		22.4%
1910	141		−14.0%
1920	129		−8.5%
1930	51		−60.5%
1940	94		84.3%
1950	50		−46.8%
Source: U.S. Census Bureau

Lying 2 miles (3.2 km) east of the city of Ferron, Molen has always been closely associated with Ferron. It was settled as an outgrowth of Ferron beginning about 1878 after Michael Molen brought his cattle and horses into Castle Valley and settled by Ferron Creek. Molen was previously named Lower Ferron.
