= Lawrence, Utah =

Unincorporated community in the state of Utah, United States

- Unincorporated community
- Location within Utah Location within the United States
- Coordinates: 39°17′44″N 110°55′45″W
- Country: United States
- State: Utah
- County: Emery
- Settled: 1883
- Named for: Lawrence Staker
- Elevation: 5,666 ft (1,727 m)
- Time zone: UTC-7 (Mountain (MST))
  - Summer (DST): UTC-6 (MDT)
- ZIP code: 84528
- Area code: 435
- GNIS feature ID: 1437620

Historical population
Census	Pop.	Note	%±
1890	107		—
1900	160		49.5%
1910	161		0.6%
1920	139		−13.7%
1930	161		15.8%
1940	169		5.0%
1950	119		−29.6%
Source: U.S. Census Bureau

Lawrence is an unincorporated community in northwestern Emery County, Utah, United States.

== History ==
Lawrence was founded circa 1883 as a Mormon farming community. It formerly had its own post office and church, but the church was demolished in the 1950s. Sometimes called "Stakerville", Lawrence was named after Lawrence Staker.
