= Clawson, Utah =

Town in the state of Utah, United States

- Town
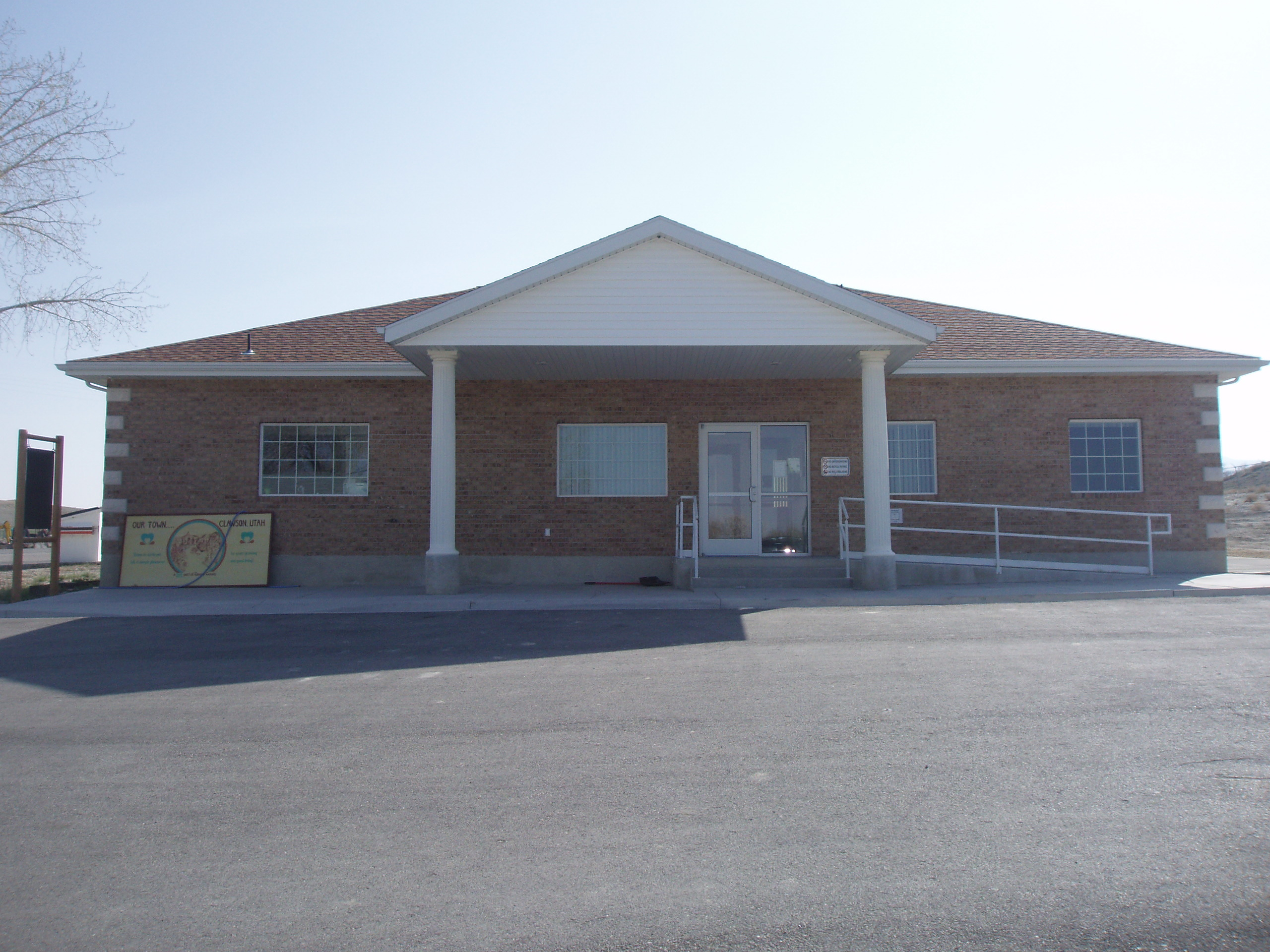
- Clawson's town hall

- Location in Emery County and the state of Utah

- Location of Utah in the United States
- Coordinates: 39°7′57″N 111°5′58″W
- Country: United States
- State: Utah
- County: Emery
- Settled: 1897
- Incorporated: 1981
- Named after: Rudger Clawson

Area
  - Total: 1.01 sq mi (2.62 km^{2})
  - Land: 1.01 sq mi (2.62 km^{2})
  - Water: 0 sq mi (0.00 km^{2})
- Elevation: 5,942 ft (1,811 m)

Population (2020)
  - Total: 162
  - Density: 161.1/sq mi (62.21/km^{2})
- Time zone: UTC-7 (Mountain (MST))
  - Summer (DST): UTC-6 (MDT)
- ZIP code: 84516
- Area code: 435
- FIPS code: 49-13300
- GNIS feature ID: 1426675

Clawson is a town in Emery County, Utah, United States. The population was 163 at the 2020 census. The community was named after Rudger Clawson, a Mormon leader.

== History ==
A canal to carry water from Ferron Creek was completed in 1896. Before being settled, the area was known as North Flat. In 1897, the first settlers arrived, calling the community "Kingsville" after Guy King, who was one of the original settlers. The first school was opened in 1898 in the home of Guy King, with Florence Barney as the teacher. She rode 14 miles (23 km) on horseback each day to the school.

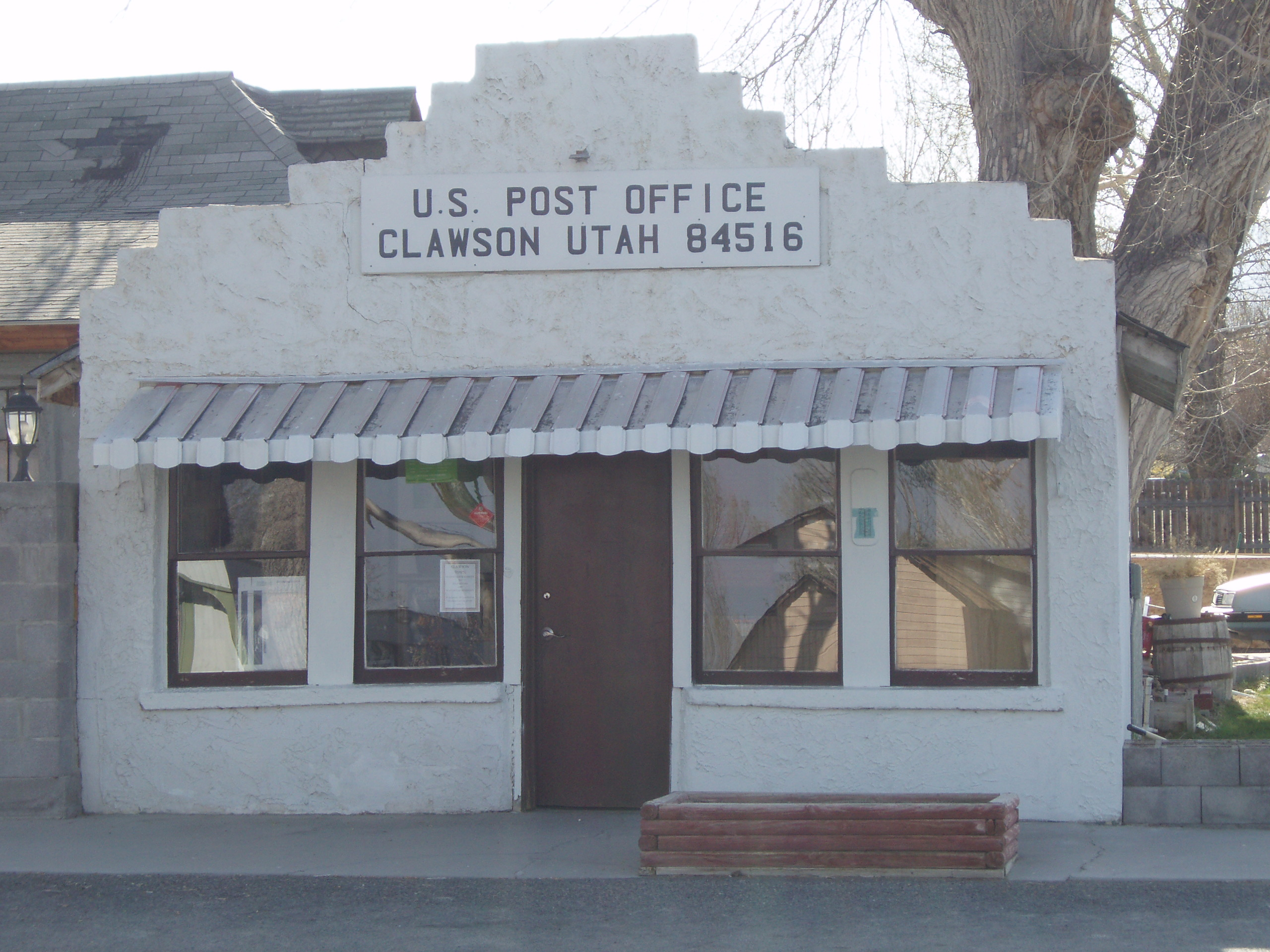
Clawson's post office

In 1902, the President of the Emery Stake, Reuben C. Miller, sent the bishopric of Ferron to select a permanent spot for the town of Kingsville. There were two candidate locations: the homesteads and the Westingkow farm 2 miles (3 km) west of that. The bishop decided it should be near the Westingkow farm because the lay of the land suggested that the old location could become swampy. Although the settlers initially disagreed, they consented, purchased the Westingkow farm, and moved their log cabins two miles to the west.

On October 25, 1904, LDS Church Apostle Rudger Clawson of the Quorum of the Twelve Apostles came and organized a ward. The town's name was changed from Kingsville to Clawson in his honor.

After decades of existing as an unincorporated community, Clawson was incorporated as a town in 1981.

== Geography ==
Clawson is located in northwestern Emery County along Utah State Route 10. It is 7 miles (11 km) southwest of Castle Dale, the county seat, and 3.5 miles (5.6 km) northeast of Ferron.

According to the United States Census Bureau, the town of Clawson has a total area of 0.69 square miles (1.8 km^{2}), all land.

=== Climate ===
Large seasonal temperature differences typify this climatic region, with warm to hot (and often humid) summers and cold (sometimes severely cold) winters. According to the Köppen Climate Classification system, Clawson has a humid continental climate, abbreviated "Dfb" on climate maps.

== Demographics ==
Historical population
Census	Pop.	Note	%±
1910	159		—
1920	183		15.1%
1930	121		−33.9%
1940	179		47.9%
1950	136		−24.0%
1980	88		—
1990	151		71.6%
2000	153		1.3%
2010	163		6.5%
2020	162		−0.6%
U.S. Decennial Census

As of the census of 2000, there were 153 people, 48 households, and 39 families residing in the town. The population density was 282.6 people per square mile (109.1 people/km^{2}). There were 52 housing units at an average density of 96.0 units per square mile (37.1 units/km^{2}). The racial makeup of the town was 96.73% White and 3.27% Native American.

There were 48 households, out of which 45.8% had children under the age of 18 living with them, 77.1% were married couples living together, 6.3% had a female householder with no husband present, and 16.7% were non-families. 14.6% of all households were made up of individuals, and 6.3% had someone living alone who was 65 years or older. The average household size was 3.19, and the average family size was 3.58.

In the town, the population was spread out, with 33.3% under 18, 8.5% from 18 to 24, 27.5% from 25 to 44, 19.6% from 45 to 64, and 11.1% who were 65 years of age or older. The median age was 33 years. For every 100 females, there were 101.3 males. For every 100 females aged 18 and over, there were 112.5 males.

The median income for a household in the town was $31,250, and the median income for a family was $35,000. Males had a median income of $32,500 versus $26,250 for females. The per capita income for the town was $8,727. About 26.2% of families and 25.5% of the population were below the poverty line, including 33.3% of those under eighteen and 18.8% of those 65 or over.
