= Moore, Utah =

Unincorporated community in Emery County, Utah, United States

- Unincorporated community
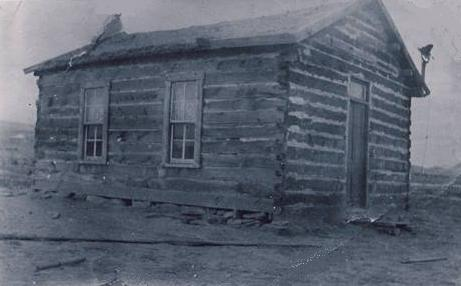
- Moore (Rochester) School House 1912

- Location of Moore within the State of Utah Moore (the United States)
- Coordinates: 38°58′10″N 111°09′33″W
- Country: United States
- State: Utah
- County: Emery
- Settled: c. 1895
- Named for: L. C. Moore

Area
  - Total: 1.3 sq mi (3.4 km^{2})
  - Land: 1.3 sq mi (3.4 km^{2})
  - Water: 0 sq mi (0.0 km^{2})
- Elevation: 6,247 ft (1,904 m)

Population (2000)
  - Total: 5
  - Density: 13/sq mi (5/km^{2})
- Time zone: UTC-7 (Mountain (MST))
  - Summer (DST): UTC-6 (MDT)
- ZIP code: 84522
- Area code: 435
- FIPS code: 49-56860
- GNIS feature ID: 1442870

Moore is an unincorporated community in west central Emery County, Utah, United States, at the edge of the San Rafael Swell.

== Description ==
Moore is an unincorporated community or populated place (Class Code U6) located in Emery County at latitude 38.967 and longitude -111.154. The elevation is 6,247 feet. Moore appears on the Emery East U.S. Geological Survey Map. The village is at the junction of County Routes County Road 801 and County Road 803 (known as the Moore Cut-off). The population was 5 at the 2000 census.

== History ==
Historical population
| Census | Pop. | Note | %± |
|---|---|---|---|
| 1930 | 114 | | — |
| 1940 | 47 | | −58.8% |
| 1950 | 41 | | −12.8% |
| 2000 | 5 | | — |
Source: U.S. Census Bureau

Originally named Rochester for the hometown in New York of M. B. Whitney who was involved in the development of the area. About the same time Emery was digging the Muddy Canal, financial investors from the Eastern States became aware of the lush, productive farmland on the flats east of the Muddy River headwaters. The investors saw the potential and formed The Independent Canal Company to claim water from the Muddy Creek and coax this arid land into producing grain like in the Midwest.

Shares were offered to residents of Emery County, who also caught their vision. They began digging and blasting to build a new canal that would irrigate farmland and provide water. The town had a store, brick school, and post office.

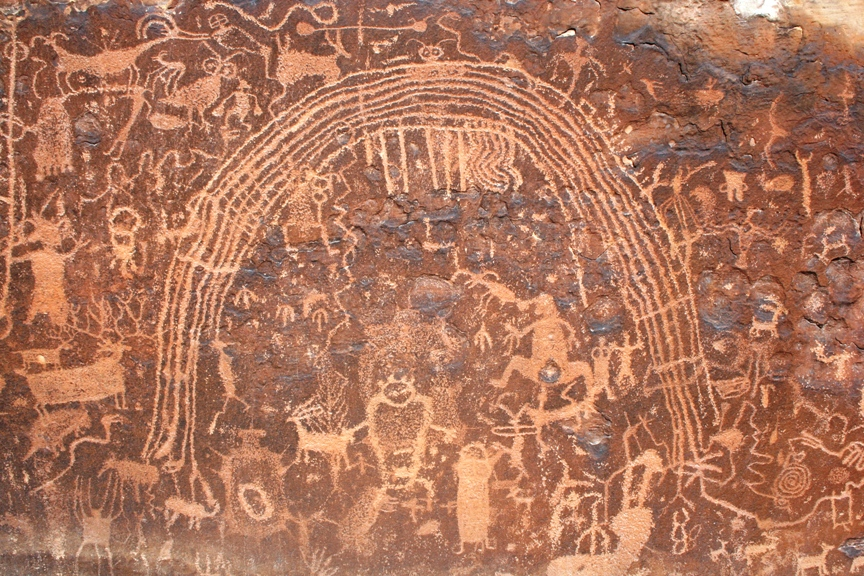
Rochester Rock Art Panel

In 1940 the community was renamed Moore after postmaster L.C. Moore who became the land development project leader for the area in 1907, when all of the Eastern investors had pulled out of the company. Only a few residents still live in Moore. Most residents have moved into neighboring towns but have kept their farmland which continues to produce great crops.

These pioneer settlements of the late 19th century were also the crossroads for other historic civilizations, such as the Fremont culture. Emery County was an important center for the Fremont Culture which dates back to about 700 to 1000. The later Bull Creek phase (1000–1200) seems to have developed during a wet cycle that allowed for more extensive agriculture and larger dwelling groups. Several rock art panels surround Moore, such as the Rochester Rock Art Panel.
